= Rich in Love =

Rich in Love may refer to:

- Rich in Love (1992 film), a drama film
- Rich in Love (2020 film), a Brazilian romantic comedy film
- Rich in Love, an album by Colin Linden
- Rich in Love (novel), a novel by Josephine Humphreys, the basis of the 1992 film
