= San Miguel de Allende =

- City
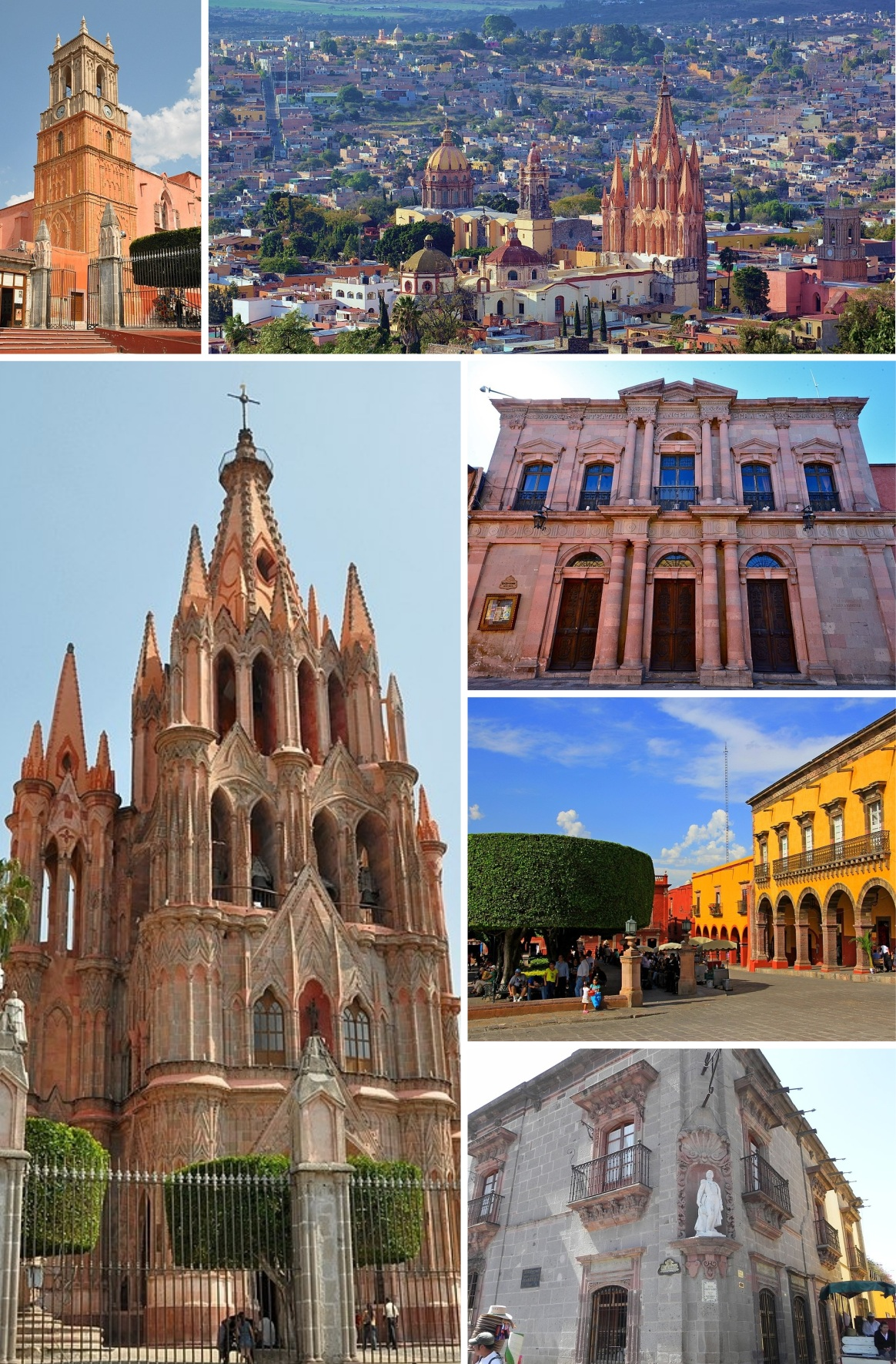
- From top to bottom: Left: - Inmaculada Concepcion Temple: La Parroquia de San Miguel Arcángel; Right: - La Parroquia and downtown San Miguel de Allende; Angela Peralta Theater; Jardín Allende; San Miguel de Allende Historic Museum

- Coat of arms
- Nickname: El Corazón de México
- Motto: Hic Natus Ubique Notus
- Location in Mexico San Miguel de Allende (Mexico)
- Coordinates: 20°54′51″N 100°44′37″W
- Country: Mexico
- State: Guanajuato
- Founded: Pre-1541
- Municipal Status: 1811

Government
  - Municipal President: Mauricio Trejo Pureco

Area
  - Municipality: 1,554 km^{2} (600 sq mi)
  - Seat: 24.27 km^{2} (9.37 sq mi)
- Elevation (of seat): 1,900 m (6,200 ft)

Population (2020 census)
  - Municipality: 174,615
  - Density: 112.4/km^{2} (291.0/sq mi)
  - Seat: 72,452
  - Seat density: 2,985/km^{2} (7,732/sq mi)
- Time zone: UTC−06:00 (Central Standard Time)
- Postal code (of seat): 37700
- Area code: 415
- Demonym: sanmiguelense
- Website: (in Spanish)

UNESCO World Heritage Site
- Official name: Protective town of San Miguel de Allende and Sanctuary of Jesús Nazareno de Atotonilco
- Type: Cultural
- Criteria: ii, iv
- Designated: 2008 (32nd session)
- Reference no.: 1274
- Region: Latin America and the Caribbean

San Miguel de Allende (Spanish pronunciation: [sam miˈɣel de aˈʎende]) is the principal city in the municipality of San Miguel de Allende, located in the far eastern part of Guanajuato, Mexico. A part of the Bajío region, the town lies 274 km (170 mi) from Mexico City, 86 km (53 mi) from Querétaro and 97 km (60 mi) from the state capital of Guanajuato. The town's name derives from a 16th-century friar, Juan de San Miguel, and a martyr of Mexican Independence, Ignacio Allende, who was born in a house facing the central plaza. San Miguel de Allende was a critical epicenter during the historic Chichimeca War (1540–1590) when the Chichimeca held back the Spanish Empire during the initial phases of European colonization. Today, an old section of the town is part of a proclaimed World Heritage Site, attracting thousands of tourists and new residents from abroad every year.

At the beginning of the 20th century, the town was in danger of becoming a ghost town after an influenza pandemic. Gradually, its Baroque/Neoclassical colonial structures were "discovered" by foreign artists who moved in and began art and cultural institutes such as the Instituto Allende and the Escuela de Bellas Artes. This gave the town a reputation, attracting artists such as David Alfaro Siqueiros, who taught painting.

This drew foreign art students, especially former US soldiers studying on the G.I. Bill after World War II. Since then, the town has attracted a significant number of foreigners from the US, Canada and Europe, shifting the area's economy from agriculture and industry to commerce that caters to tourists and retired foreign residents.

The United Nations Educational, Scientific and Cultural Organization (UNESCO) designated the Protective town of San Miguel and the Sanctuary of Jesús Nazareno de Atotonilco as a World Heritage Site in 2008. The area of designation includes part of the town of San Miguel de Allende and part of the town of Atotonilco, which is about 14 kilometers north. The World Heritage Site is highlighted by a core zone of 43 hectares in San Miguel de Allende's well-preserved historic center, filled with buildings from the 17th and 18th centuries. The other part of the World Heritage Site, the Sanctuary of Atotonilco, has a core zone of .75 hectares surrounded by a buffer zone of about 4.5 hectares.

== History ==
=== Founding of the city ===
Before the arrival of the Spanish in the early 16th century, San Miguel was an indigenous Chichimeca village called Itzcuinapan. Then a small chapel was built near Itzcuinapan by Miguel Palanca. He decided to dedicate the Spanish town to the Archangel Michael. However, Spanish invasion and attempts to enslave women, men and children to work the silver mines quickly created a hostile environment with the Chichimeca natives. The Chichimecas began defending their ancestral lands against the invasion by Spanish soldiers and colonizers. In 1551, the Guamare people, a Chichimeca group, attacked Spanish military posts and settlements. This overt hostility, along with multiple failed attempts by the Spanish to provide water to their own settlements in the area, caused the original location to be pushed out.

The village was officially re-established in 1555 by Juan de San Miguel's successor, Bernardo Cossin, and indigenous leader Fernando de Tapia. It was refounded both as a mission and as a military outpost. The new site was a mile east of the old one at a place with two fresh water springs (called Batán and Izcuinapan) and with terrain better suited for defense. "The two springs supplied all of the town's water until the 1970s", Palanca said.

=== Colonial period ===
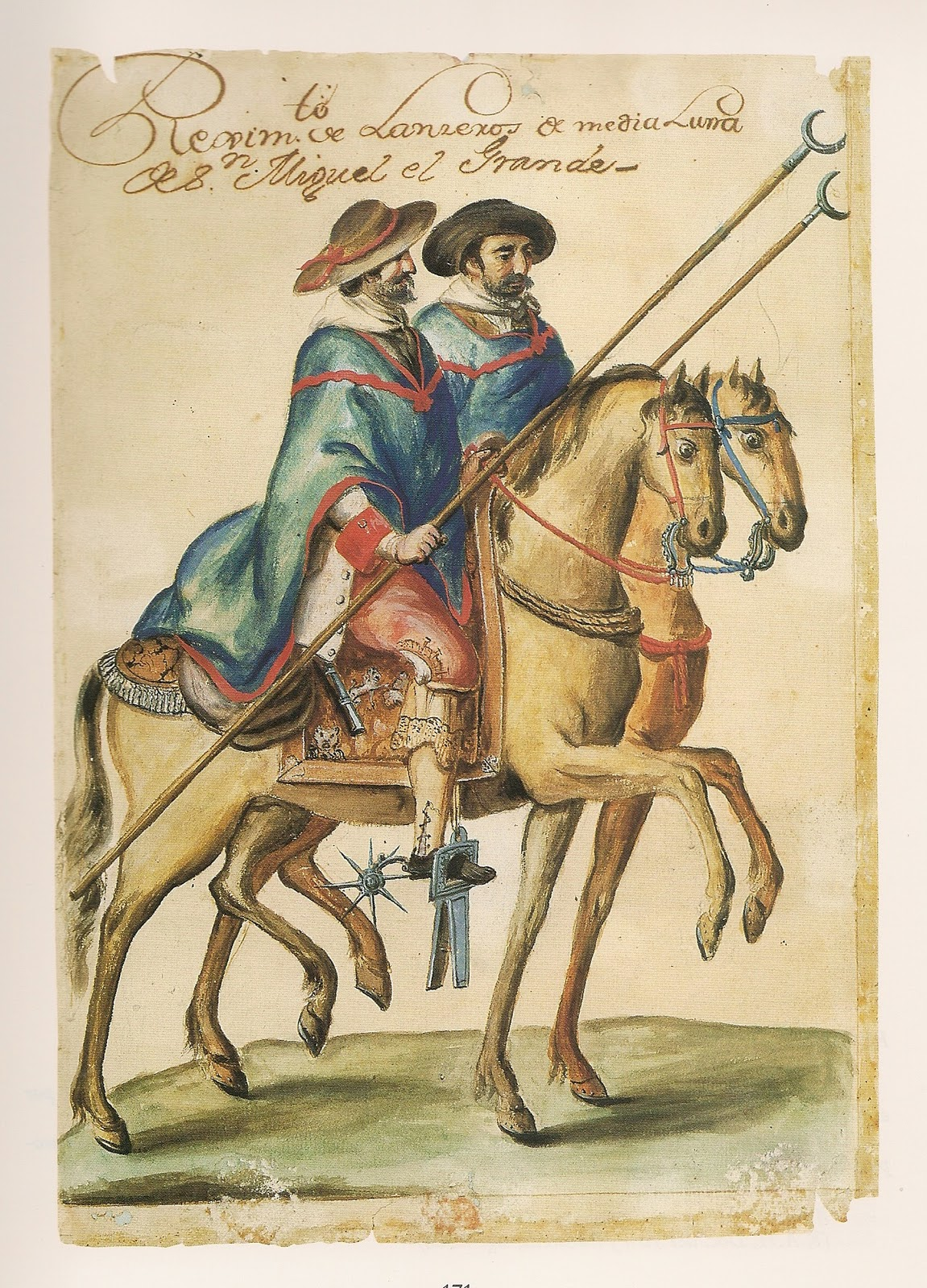
18th century Regiment of “Lanceros de Media Luna” or Crescent Moon Lancers from San Miguel el Grande.

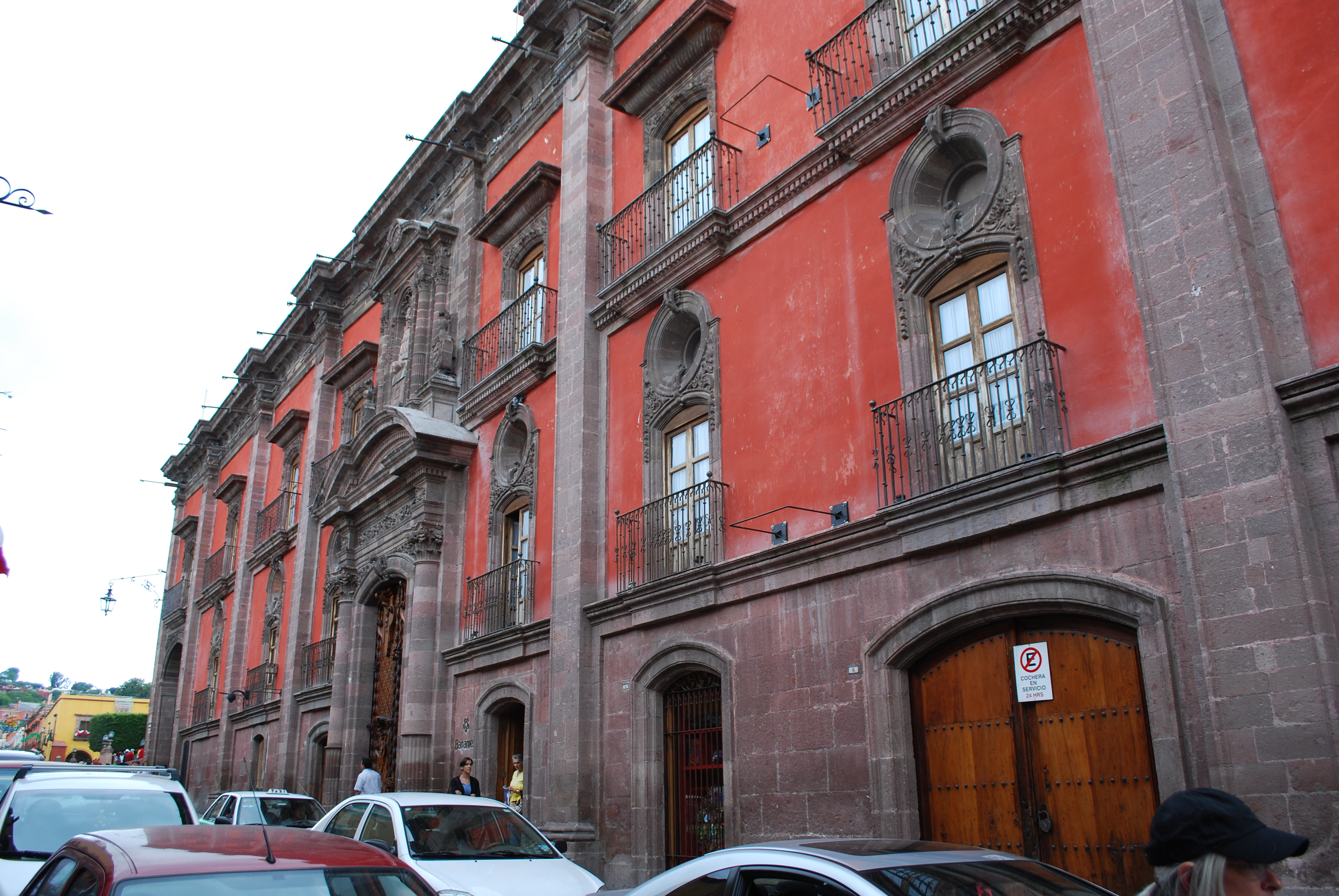
The House of the Counts of the Canal, built in the 18th century and currently owned by Banamex.

By the mid-16th century, silver had been discovered in Guanajuato and Zacatecas and a major road between this area and Mexico City passed through San Miguel. Indigenous attacks on caravans continued and San Miguel became an important military and commercial site. This led to the 40-year Chichimeca War. The viceroy in Mexico City granted lands and cattle to a number of Spaniards to motivate them to settle the area. He also gave indigenous groups limited self-rule and excused them from taxation. The location of the town created a melting pot as Spanish, indigenous peoples and later criollos exchanged cultural influences.

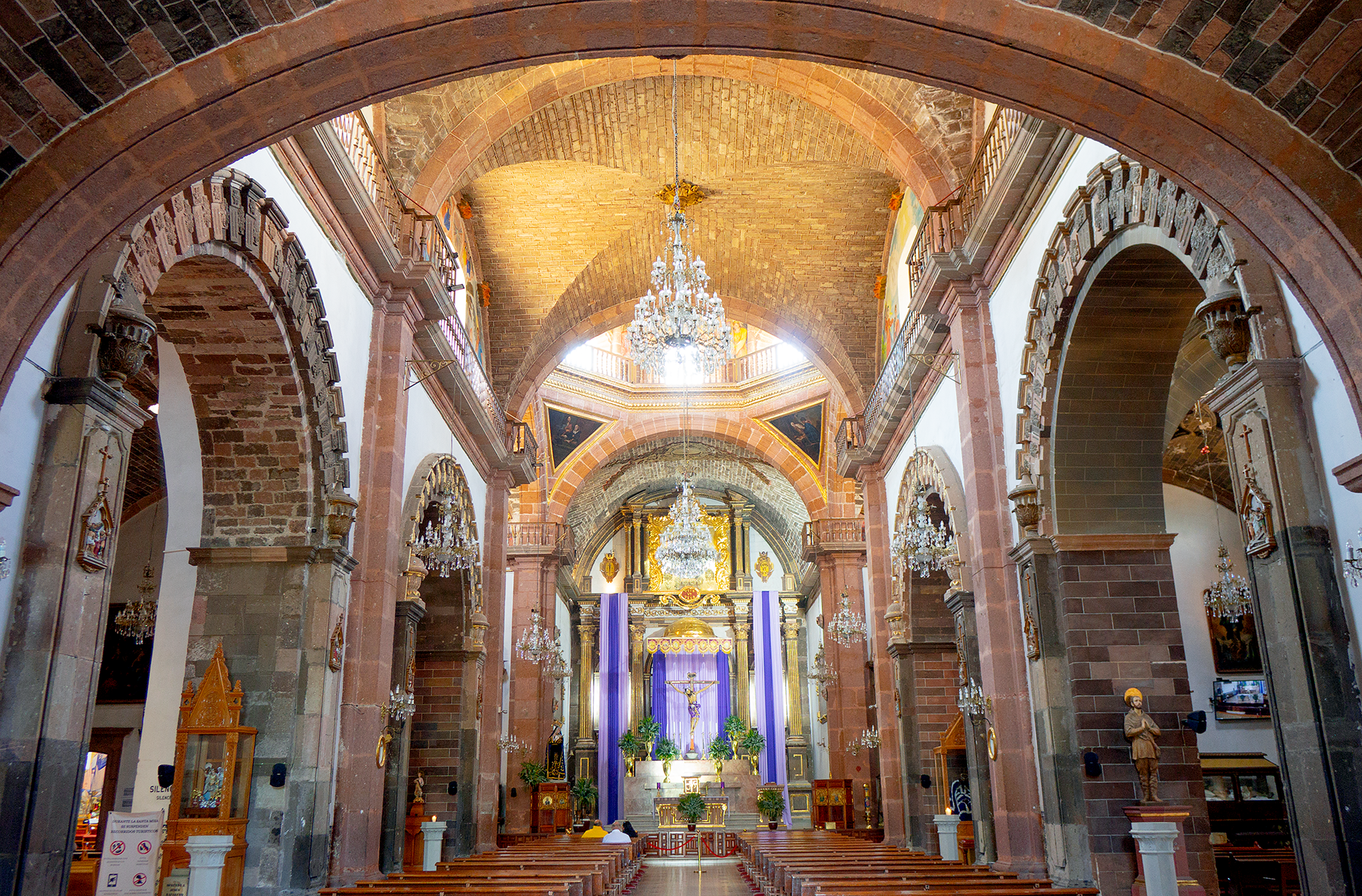
Parroquia de San Miguel Arcángel

Eventually, major roads would connect the town with the mining communities in San Luis Potosí, Zacatecas and the rest of the state of Guanajuato. Serving travelers' needs and providing supplies to mining camps made the town rich. Textile manufacture was a major industry. Locals claim that the serape was invented here. By the mid-18th century, the city was at its height and this was when most of its large mansions, palaces and religious buildings were constructed. Most still remain. For example, the Parroquia de San Miguel Arcángel church had been constructed during 1680-1685 and the adjacent San Rafael Church (Santa Escuela) opened in 1742.

Altar area, Templo de San Francisco

As the population increased, additional places of worship were built, such as the Templo de San Francisco, constructed between 1779 and 1799 by Franciscans. The town was also home to the area's wealthy hacienda owners. At the time, it was one of the most important and prosperous settlements in New Spain with a population reaching 30,000. By comparison, in the mid-18th century Boston had a population of only 16,000 and New York 25,000. The town's apogee came during the transition period between Baroque and Neoclassical architecture and many of the mansions and churches show both influences. Mansions built in San Miguel are larger than normal for a settlement of its size.

=== Independence ===
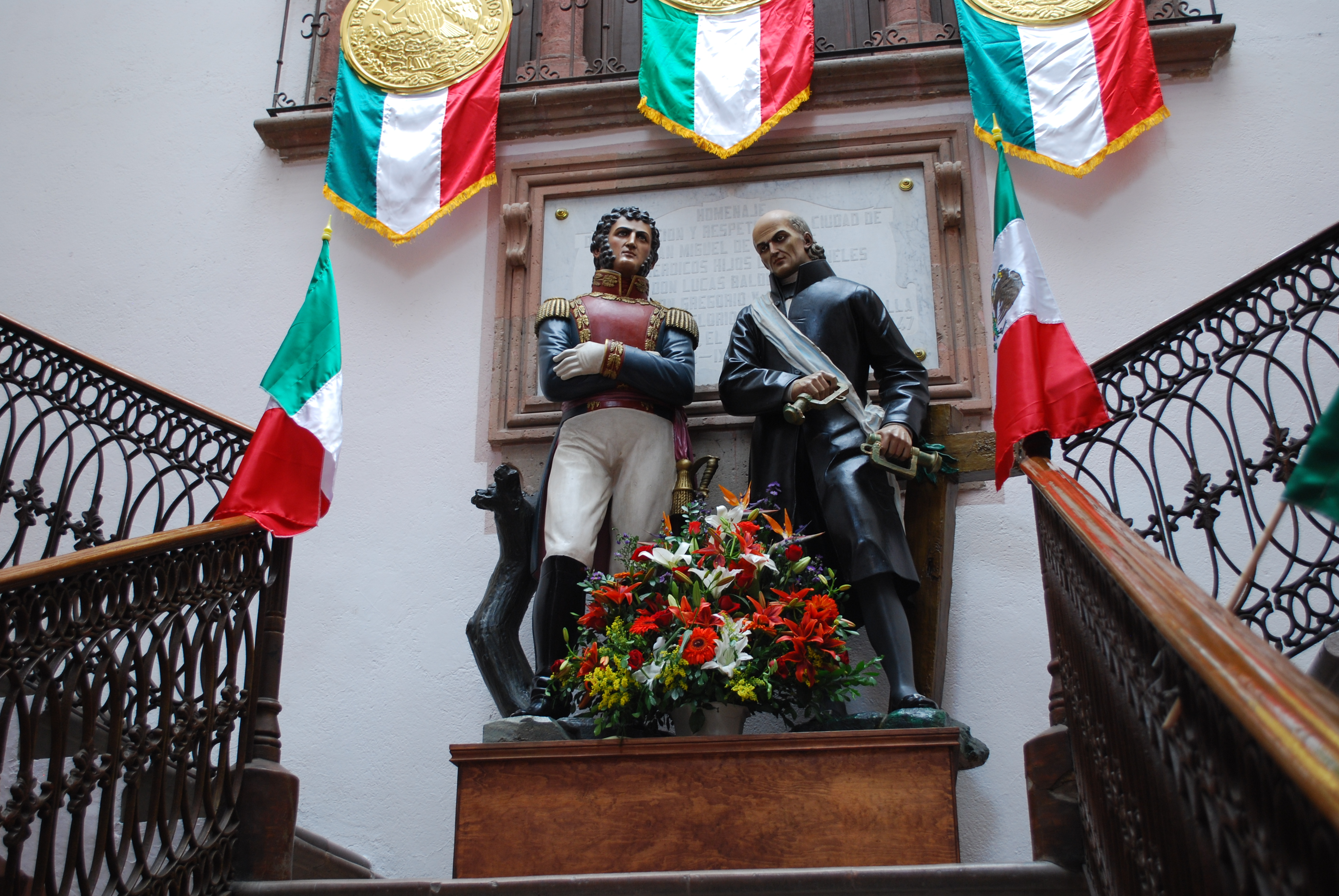
Statues of Allende and Hidalgo in the municipal palace

The prominence of the city declined at the beginning of the 19th century, mostly due to the Mexican War of Independence. However, it played an important early role in this conflict. It is the birthplace of two significant figures of the war, Juan Aldama and Ignacio Allende. Both were involved in a conspiracy against the colonial government in Mexico City, along with Miguel Hidalgo y Costilla and Josefa Ortiz de Domínguez. When this conspiracy was discovered, the warning to Hidalgo and Allende passed through this town and onto Dolores (Hidalgo), just to the north. This prompted Hidalgo's "Grito de Dolores" assembling the insurgent army on 15 and 16 September 1810. The new insurgent army first came to San Miguel, stopping at a religious sanctuary in Atotonilco just outside.

Hidalgo took a standard bearing an image of the Virgin of Guadalupe from here; this standard is now in the Museo del Ejercito in Spain. Then the army entered San Miguel proper to name officers and to free prisoners in the local jail. San Miguel was the first Mexican town to gain its independence from Spain.

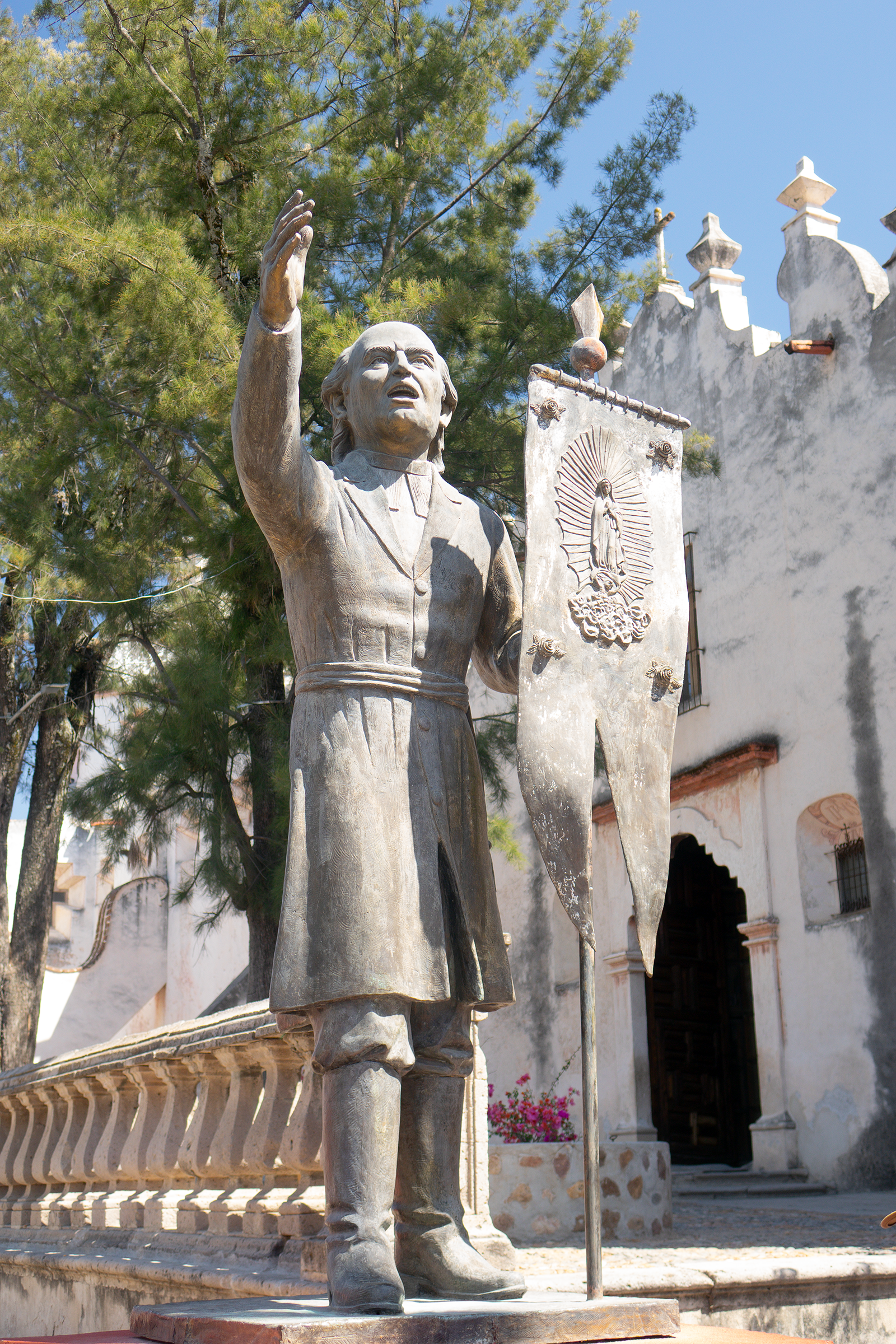
Father Miguel Hidalgo y Costilla with his banner, Statue at the Sanctuary in Atotonilco

While there was no further military action in the immediate area, economically the town waned as agriculture suffered and the population declined. This continued for most of the rest of the 19th century as the country was torn between Liberal and Conservative factions vying for power. After the war, the town was declared a city by the state congress in 1826 and its name was modified to San Miguel de Allende in honor of Ignacio Allende.

There was some economic recovery near the end of the 19th century during the rule of Porfirio Díaz. During this time, dams, aqueducts and railroads were built. Agriculture made a comeback with the introduction of fruit orchards. However, decline returned with the end of mining in almost all of the state of Guanajuato. Between this and the beginning of the Mexican Revolution, San Miguel almost became a ghost town. What remained was preserved after the new Mexican government, under the Instituto Nacional de Antropología e Historia (INAH), declared San Miguel a "Historic and Protected Town" in 1926, establishing guidelines and restrictions aimed at keeping its colonial appearance. Historian Lisa Pinley Covert denies that such an event occurred in 1926, yet acknowledges that a federal law of 1926 nationalized many Catholic properties in the city, even if historic preservation had not been the motivation.

=== 20th century to the present ===
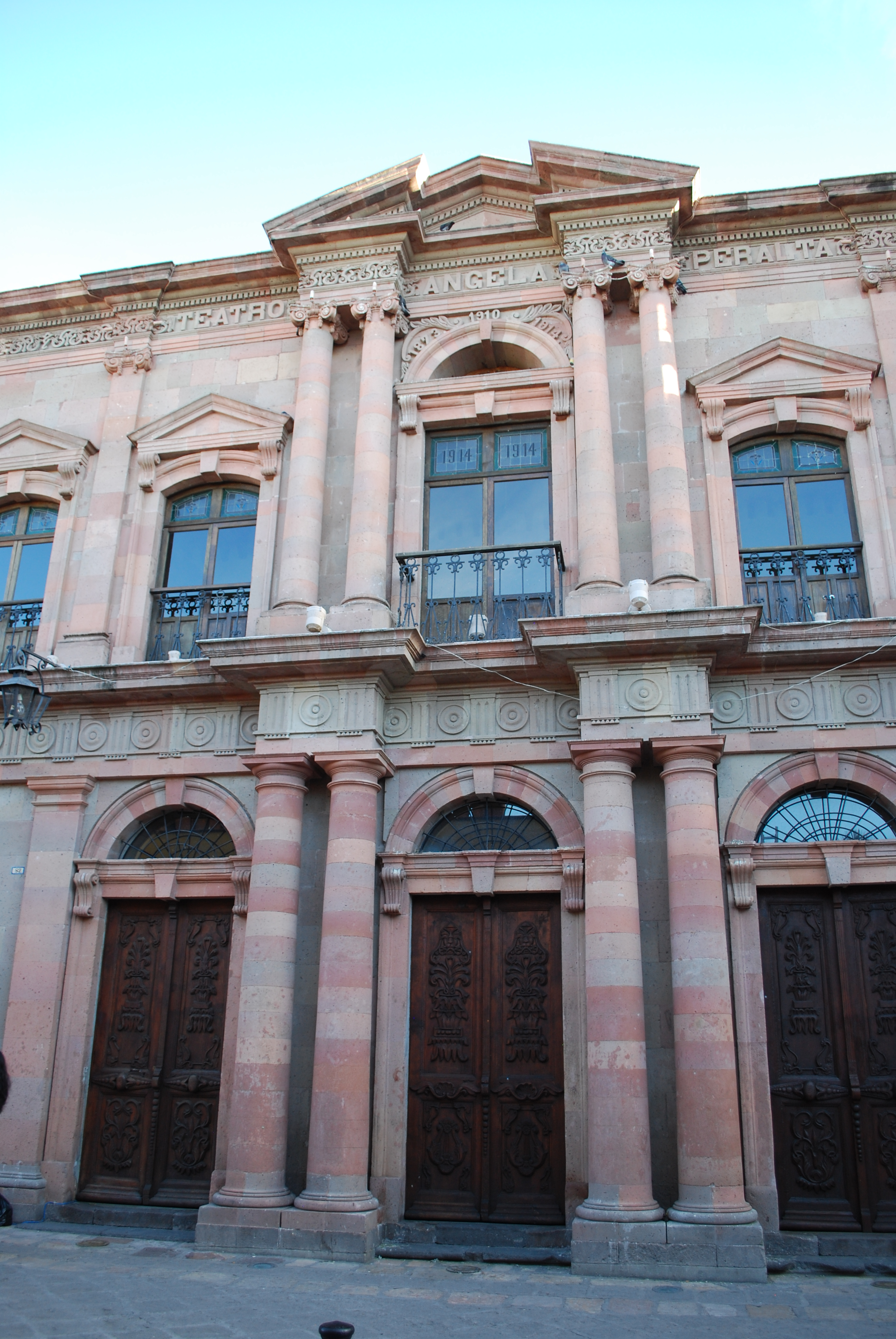
Angela Peralta Theater, built in the early 20th century

American artist and writer Stirling Dickinson arrived in 1937 and should be credited with creating the first wave of advertising abroad about San Miguel's virtues. Dickinson met Peruvian intellectual, author and painter Felipe Cossio del Pomar, who had the idea of establishing an art colony in the heart of Mexico. The first art school was established in 1938 in an old convent—still in use provisionally as a school, after having been soldiers' barracks—which Cossio del Pomar secured from then Mexican president Lázaro Cárdenas. The school was called Escuela de Bellas Artes and continues to exist today, known locally as Bellas Artes or Centro Cultural El Nigromante. In the 1940s, Dickinson also assisted Cossio del Pomar and Enrique Fernández Martinez, the former governor of the state of Guanajuato, to establish what became the Instituto Allende. Despite their rural location, both schools found success after World War II. US veterans studying under the G.I. Bill were permitted to study abroad and these schools took advantage of that to attract former soldiers as students. Enrollment at the schools rose and this began the town's cultural reputation. This attracted more artists and writers, including José Chávez Morado and David Alfaro Siqueiros, who taught painting at the Escuela de Bellas Artes. This, in turn, spurred the opening of hotels, shops and restaurants to cater to the new visitors and residents. Many of the American veterans who came to study in San Miguel returned later to retire, some marrying and raising international families such as the Vidargas, Andre, Maxwell and Breck families.

The town's cultural, foreign and cosmopolitan nature has continued since that time. The city took on a bohemian quality starting in the 1950s with the party ambience of many resident immigrants and artists. In the 1960s, Cantinflas promoted the area among his friends in the film industry. Hippies were taken in for haircuts by the authorities in the 1970s and now the town is generally too expensive for the backpacking travelers of the 21st century. The growing attraction of the town and its colonial buildings has created a vibrant real estate market, which until recently was not affected by Mexico's fluctuating economy. Many of the old "ruins" of colonial houses have been sold for more than a house in Mexico City.

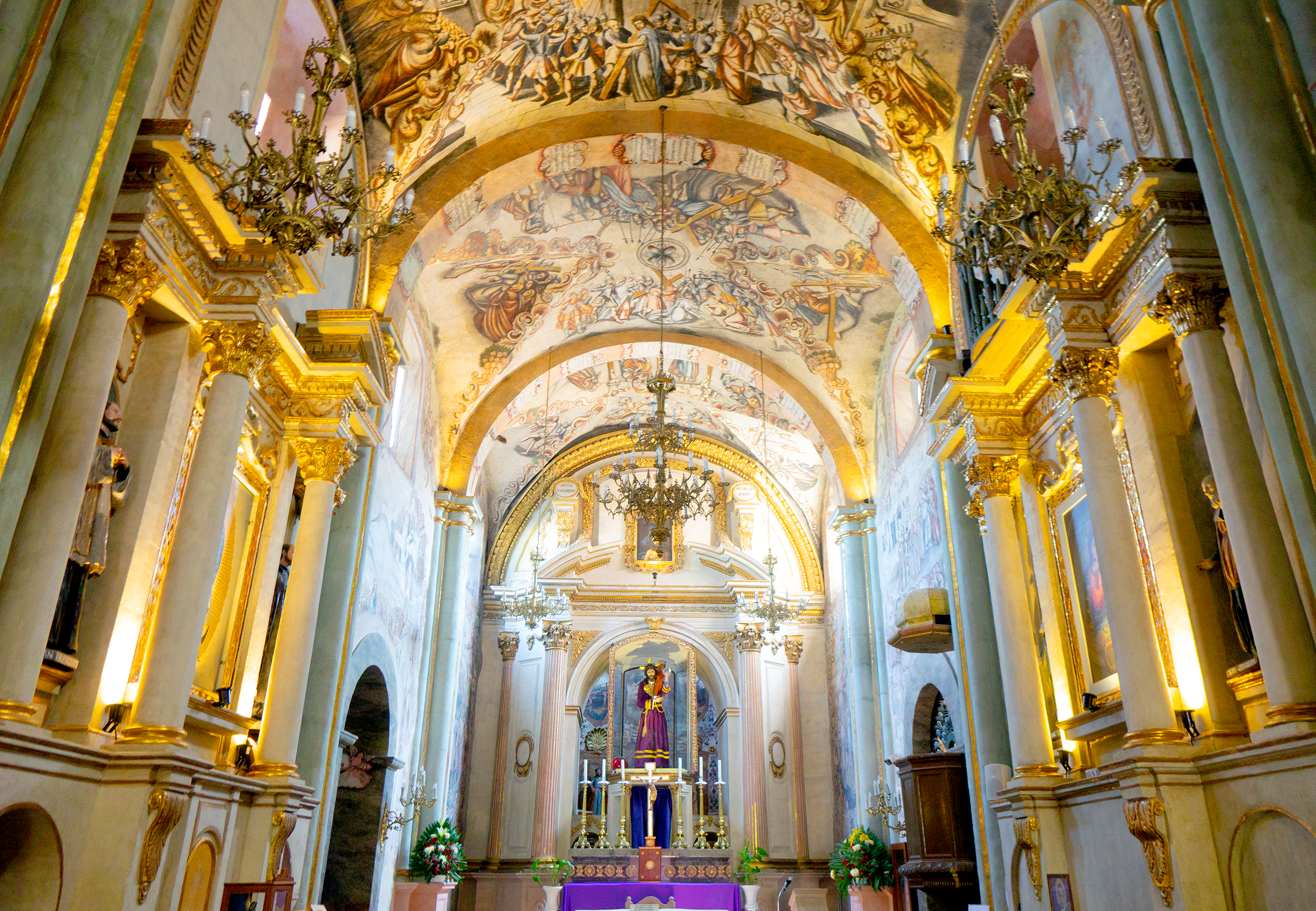
The altar area of the 18th century Sanctuary at Atotonilco

The city, as well as the nearby Sanctuary of Jesús Nazareno at Atotonilco, were declared a World Heritage Site by UNESCO in July 2008. The decision was made both for its well-preserved Baroque colonial architecture and layout and for its historic role in the Mexican War of Independence. The area that has been inscribed includes 64 blocks of the historic center and the sanctuary of Atotonilco with the title "Villa Protectora de San Miguel el Grande y el Santuario de Jesus Nazareno de Atotonilco".

== Demographics ==
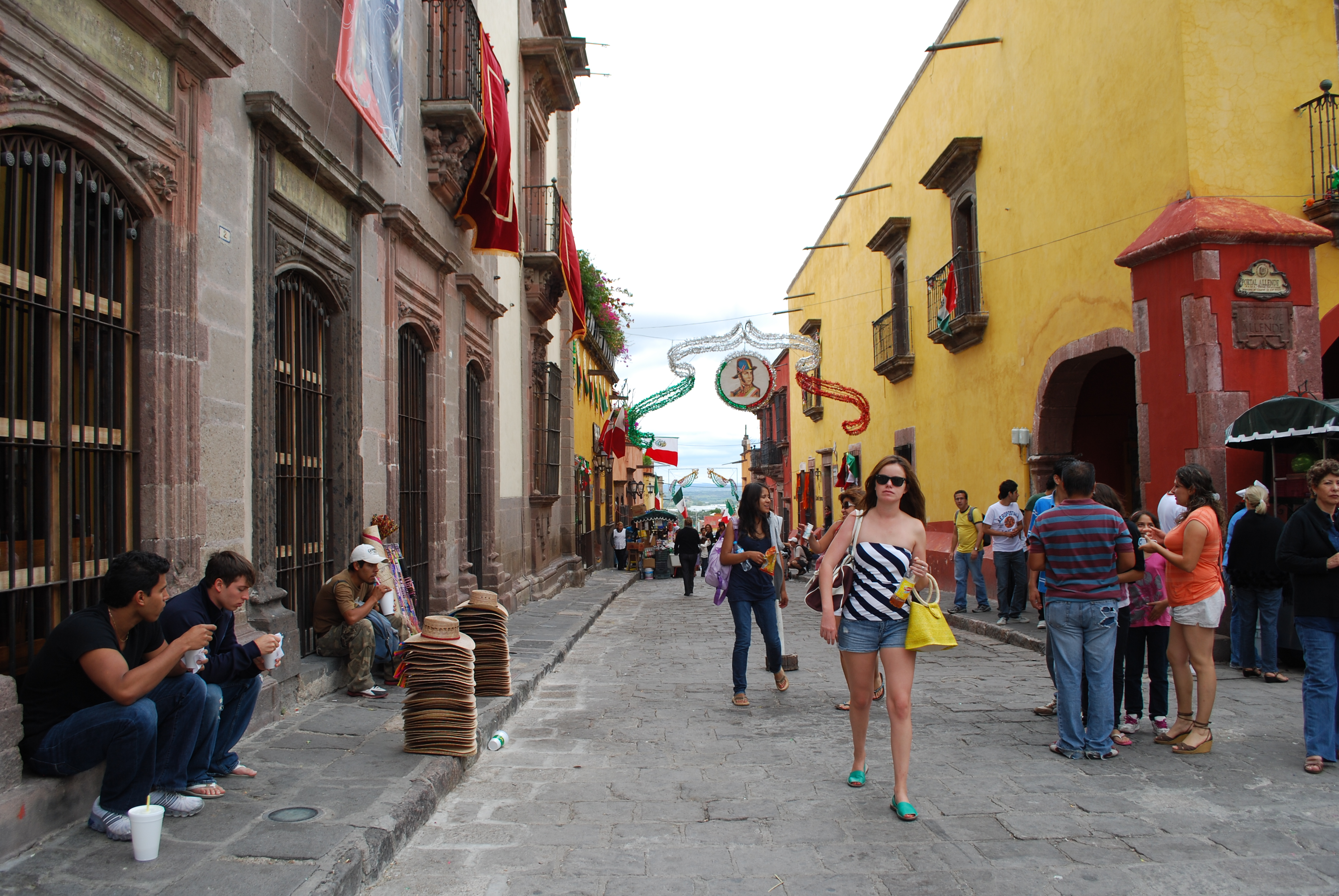
View of calle Umaran in the downtown.

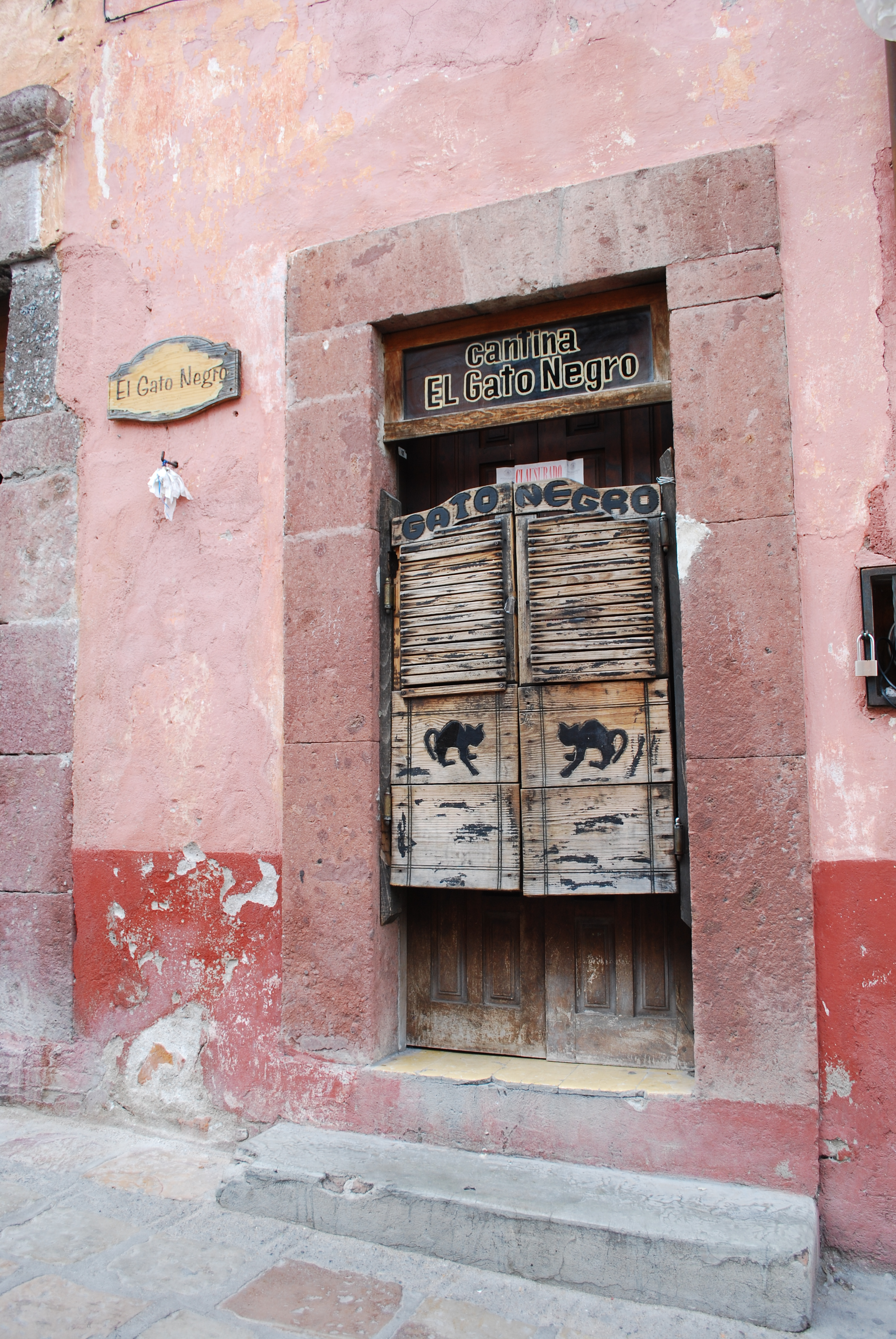
Gato Negro bar, Mesones street

Despite being less than 5% of the total municipal population, foreign residents have considerable cultural and economic impact. Most foreign residents are retirees from the United States, Canada, and Europe attracted by the mild climate, cultural opportunities, and low crime. It is only a ten-hour drive from the U.S. border. Many of the home buyers are from this segment of the population as well. Estimates of foreign residents range from 20,000 to 25,000, with at least half of these from the United States. The large foreign presence has established a number of institutions here, most notably the Biblioteca Pública in the former convent of Santa Ana, which has the second-largest English-language book collection in Mexico and serves as a community center for foreigners. There is also a chapter of the Lion's Club (est. 1987). A post of the American Legion and the Veterans of Foreign Wars is located there, as well as Mexico's only Audubon Society chapter.

While the town and municipality have grown since the coming of foreigners in the 1940s, the highest rates of growth occurred between 1980 and 2000, rising from 77,624 to 110,692, or about 43%. However, since that time growth has slowed and as of the 2005 census, the population stood at 139,297. Most of the drop has been due to the fall in birthrates. The overall population of the municipality is young: about 40% is under the age of 15, with those between 15 and 64 making up about 54% of the population. While the majority of the population of the municipality of Allende lives in a collection of small rural communities that do not exceed 2,500 people, the largest single population center is the town of San Miguel de Allende, which houses 59,691 people, about 44% of the municipality's population. The next three largest towns each have populations smaller than 3,000 people: Los Rodríguez (2,768), Colonia San Luis Rey (1,850), and Corral de Piedras de Arriba (1,701).

These smaller communities are populated by the municipality's indigenous groups, mostly Otomi and Nahuas. The Otomi are the largest group, accounting for just under 38% of the municipal population. The Nahuas follow at about 20%. Other groups include the Mazahua, Huasteca and Purépecha. However, according to the 2002 census, only 520 people speak an indigenous language, 472 of whom also speak Spanish.

Interior of San Juan De Dios Church, founded in the 1600s

Catholicism is practiced by 96% of the population, supported by 16 churches, one Oratorio and several chapels. Most others are Protestants, including Evangelicals. There is a small Jewish community, and the Jewish Cultural & Community Center offers services and other events; members are largely foreign immigrants and some Mexican converts.

The municipality is home to three institutions of higher education, the Instituto Tecnológico SSC, a campus of the Universidad Tecnólogica de León, and the Universidad Tecnológica de San Miguel de Allende. The city also has bilingual schools that follow the curriculum of the American educational system. As of 2000, 17.5% of the population is considered to be illiterate, compared to 12.1% for the rest of the state.

== Landmarks ==
=== Historic core zone ===
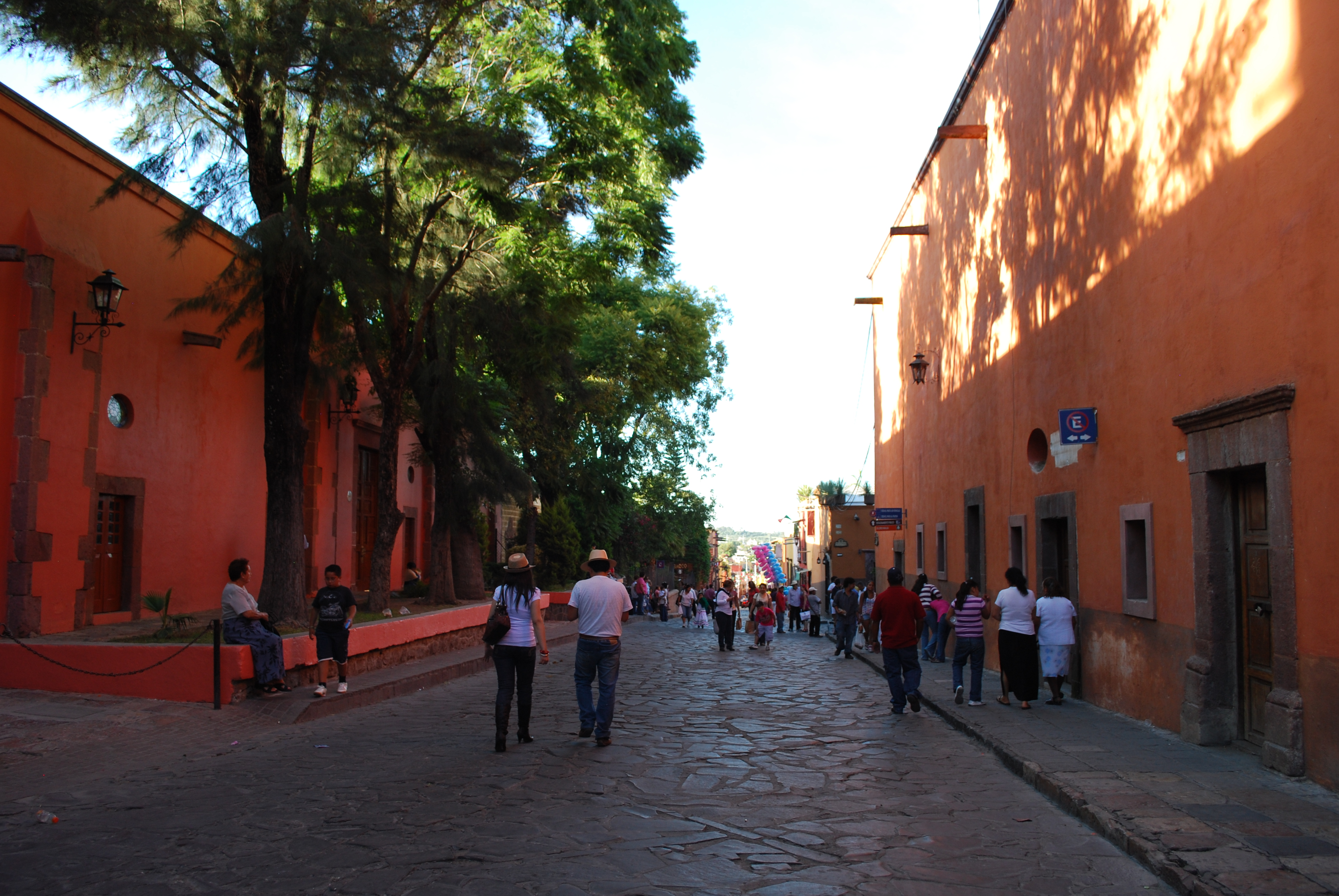
Hernandez Macias street

The historic core zone of San Miguel was defined by the federal government in 1982 and adopted by UNESCO in 2008. This is a 43 hectare area, partly defined by Insurgentes to the north, Quebrada to the west, and Terraplen and Huerta to the south. Two buffer zones totaling about forty hectares are adjacent to the core zone.

At the entrance of the city stand the statues of Ignacio Allende, Juan Aldama, Miguel Hidalgo and Josefa Ortiz de Dominguez, with one of the Archangel Michael in the center. While the outlying areas of the town and municipality have changed over time, the historic center remains much as it was 250 years ago. The layout of the center of the city is mostly a straight grid, as was favored by the Spanish during colonial times. However, due to the terrain, many roads are not straight. There are no parking meters, no traffic signals and no fast food restaurants. These roads are lined with colonial-era homes and churches. With a few exceptions, the architecture is domestic rather than monumental, with well-tended courtyards and rich architectural details. The houses have solid walls against the sidewalks, painted in various colors, many with bougainvillea vines falling down the outside and the occasional iron-grated window. Many of the larger structures have large entrances that once accommodated horses and carriages.

Jardín Allende (Allende Garden) is the town's main plaza, which serves as a venue for music concerts and other cultural activities. The plaza includes formal landscaping and wrought-iron benches throughout, and is a center of social activity in San Miguel.

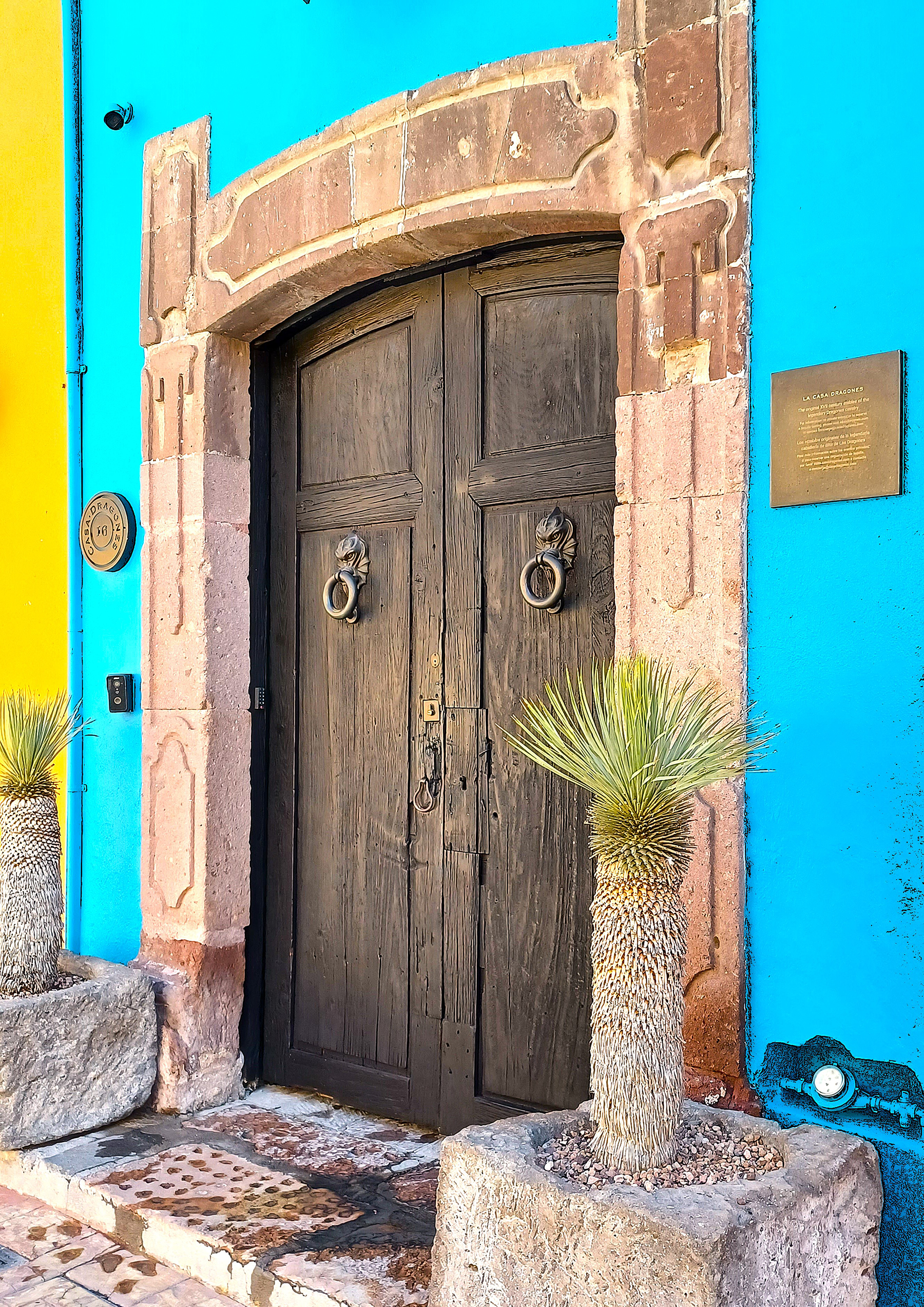
One of the many doors in the historic center.

In the historic center, there are an estimated two thousand doors, behind which there are at least two thousand courtyards of various sizes. Many of these have been restored to their former colonial state, with façades of ochre, orange and yellow, windows and doors framed by handcrafted ironwork and made of hewn wood. The interior roofs are flat, of heavy mortar supported by large beams. Very few structures have atriums or front yards; instead, open private space is behind the main façade in courtyards. These courtyards are where the private gardens were, protected from dust, excess water and crime.

The town is noted for its streetscapes with narrow cobblestone lanes, that rise and fall over the hilly terrain. It is still a small city, and at night, many wander the narrow streets in relative safety. Several publications have named it one of the top 10 places to retire. The town has attracted residents such as Jose Guadalupe Mojica, Pedro Vargas and Cantinflas. Additionally, indigenous Otomis and Nahuas (Chichimecas) can be seen on the streets, as they come from rural communities to trade and attend church.

Since the 1920s, steps have been taken to preserve the historic center's charm. The first set of protections was put into place by the Instituto Nacional de Antropología e Historia (INAH) when it was declared a national monument. This required all restoration and new construction to conform to the area's colonial architecture. To preserve the city's trademark colonial look, a civil society regulates the renovation and maintenance of the city, especially its historic center. This includes aspects such as traffic, garden spaces and the kinds of social events that may be held. The town has also put effort into preserving the cobblestone streets. The most recent designation is that of a World Heritage site, along with the religious sanctuary in nearby Atotonilco, which also puts restrictions and protections into place.

Oratorio of San Felipe Neri primarily built in 1712; underwent a significant restoration circa 1995

About half of the colonial buildings have been partially or fully converted into businesses such as stores, restaurants, galleries, workshops and hotels. Since there is no zoning, residential and commercial establishments are mixed. Although it is small and rural, it has a wide variety of restaurants, specialty shops and art galleries. Around the historic center there are over 80 bars and cantinas as well as various nightclubs.

In September 2010, the first contemporary architectural structure arrived in the historic colonial center with the opening of Hotel Matilda. The hotel's four buildings have a modern design, with public areas decorated with the art works of contemporary Latin artists, many of them very large pieces. Only the exterior street wall, along Calle Aldama, reflects the colonial style.

The oldest part of the town is the El Chorro neighborhood. This is where the village of San Miguel was moved to in 1555. The Nahuatl name for the area was Izcuinapan or "place of dogs", and according to legend, dogs led Juan de San Miguel to this area to find this spring. This area is the home of the Parish of San Miguel, the Jardin Principal (English: main garden) and an earlier church called the San Rafael or Santa Escuela Church.

The Parroquia de San Miguel Arcángel, built in the 17th century, but redesigned between 1880 and 1890

La Parroquia de San Miguel Arcángel, the current parish church of San Miguel, is unique in Mexico and the emblem of the town. It is one of the most-photographed churches in Mexico and the two tall towers of its neo-Gothic façade can be seen from most parts of town. The church was built in the 17th century with a traditional Mexican façade. The current Gothic façade was constructed in 1880 by Zeferino Gutierrez, an indigenous bricklayer and self-taught architect. It is said Gutierrez's inspiration came from postcards and lithographs of Gothic churches in Europe; however, the interpretation is his own and more a work of imagination than a faithful reconstruction. In front of this façade is a small atrium, which is guarded by a wrought iron fence. There is a monument in the atrium dedicated to Bishop José María de Jesús Diez de Sollano y Davalos. The San Rafael or Santa Escuela Church is located to the side of the parish. It was founded by Luis Felipe Neri de Alfaro in 1742. The main façade has two levels with arches, pilasters, floral motifs and a frieze on the first level. The second level has a choir window framed by pink sandstone. The bell tower is Moorish. According to legend, this older chapel was the site of the first Christian ceremony in San Miguel.

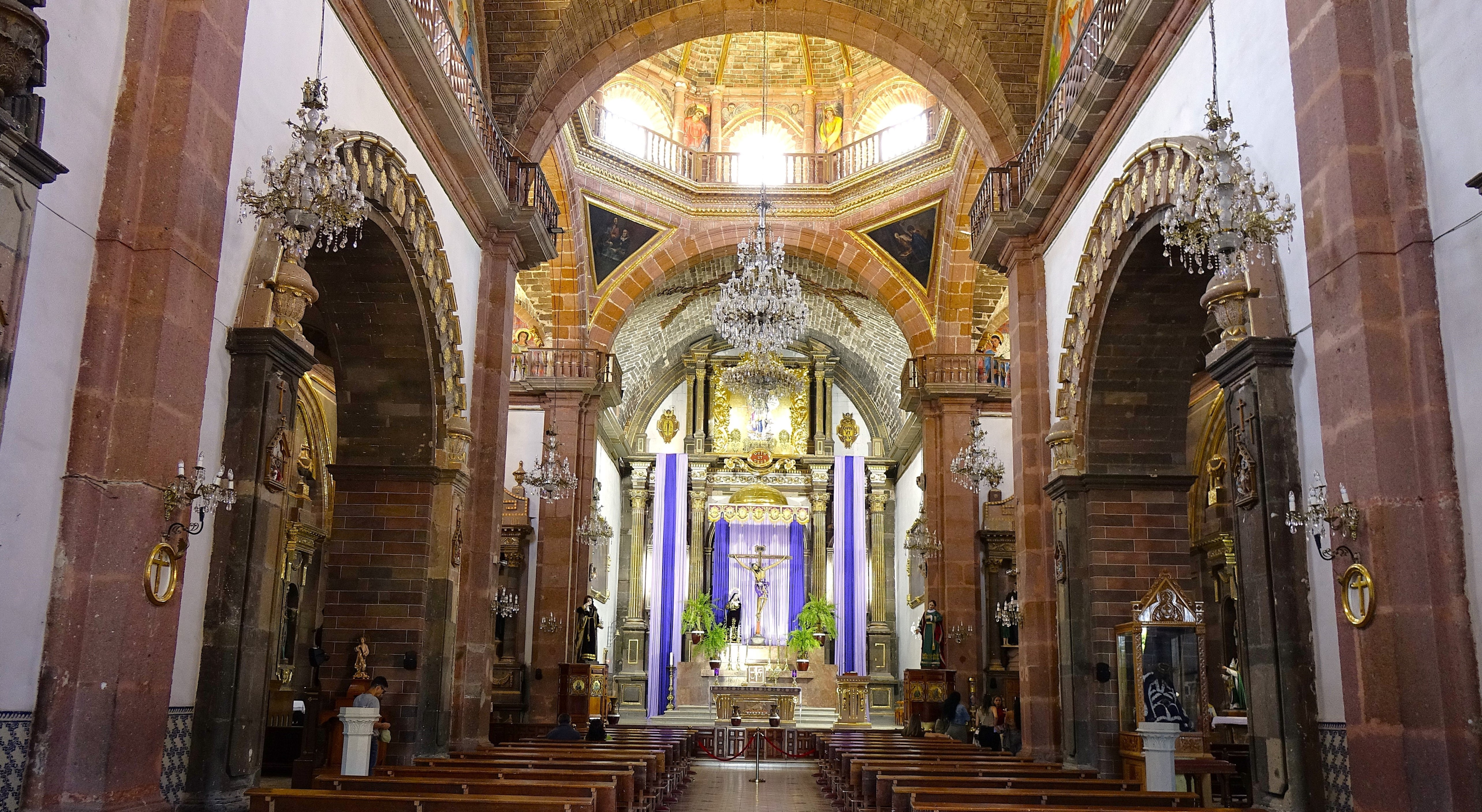
Parroquia interior

At the entrance of the main church, there is an inscription which states that Miguel Hidalgo y Costilla and his brother Jose Joaquin served as priests here. There is another one acknowledging Gutierrez's work on the façade. The interior of the church still has the original 17th-century layout and interior design, but the church was looted several times during Mexico's history so much of its decoration is lost. However, one significant image here is the "Señor de la Conquista", which was made of cornstalk paste by indigenous people in Michoacán. The sacristy contains a painting depicting the founding of the town in 1542 and its subsequent move to Izcuinapan in the El Chorro neighborhood. There is a small crypt under the altar with access through a small door to the right. This crypt contains the remains of former bishops of the church and other dignitaries, including a former president of Mexico. It is opened to the public one day each year, on 2 November, Day of the Dead.

In front of the church complex is the Plaza Allende, popularly known as Jardin Principal (English: main garden), but most often referred to simply as el jardin. It was designed in French style, with wrought iron benches and filled with Indian laurel trees. It is a popular place to sit and relax and bands often play in the kiosk on weekends. In addition to the parish, other important structures, such as the Ignacio Allende House, the Canal House and the municipal palace overlook the garden.

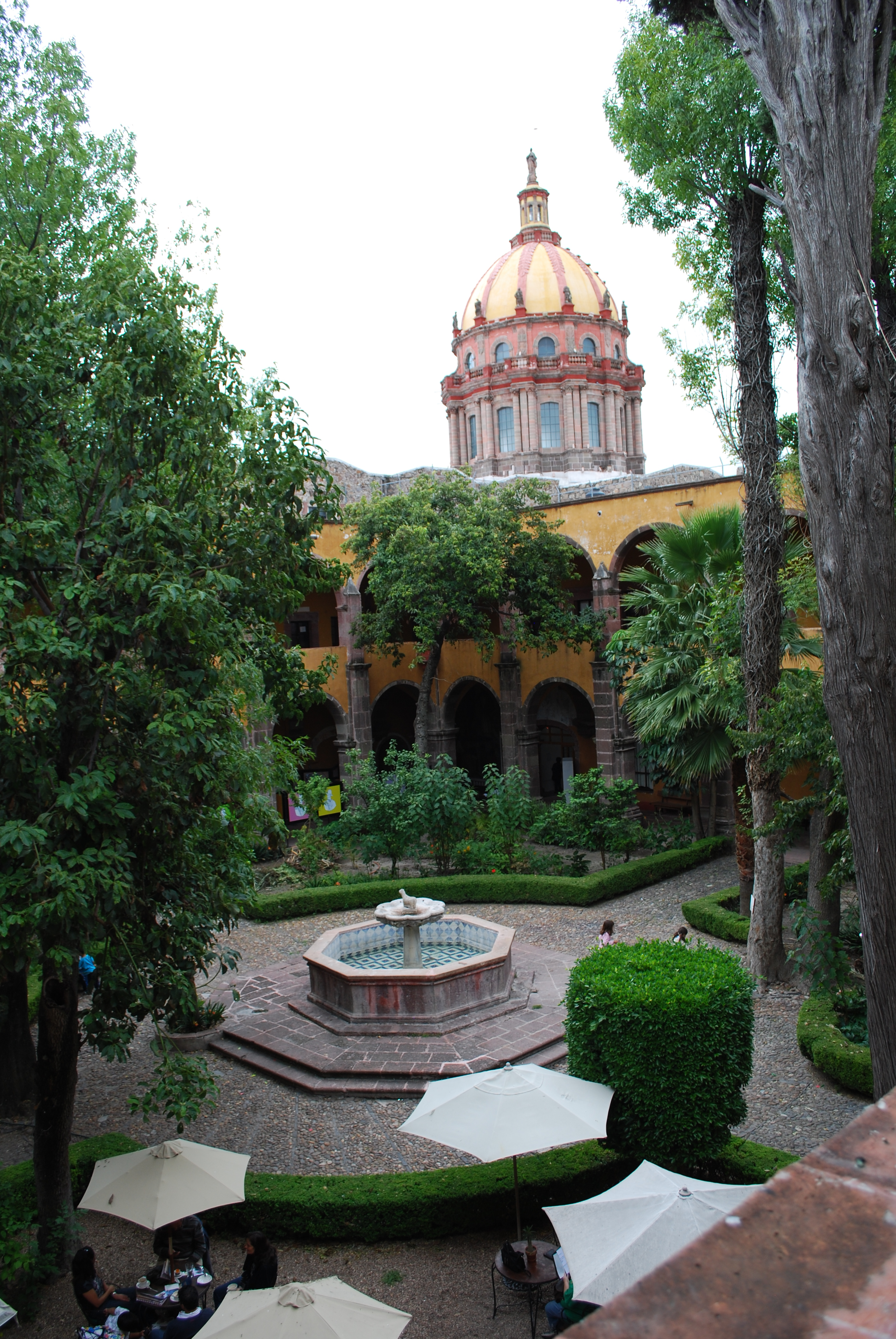
Courtyard of the Centro Cultural with the dome of the Church of the Nuns in the background.

The Centro Cultural Ignacio Ramirez, also called the Escuela de Bellas Artes or El Nigromante, is housed in the former Hermanas de la Concepción (English: Sisters of the Conception) convent. The Concepcion convent and adjoining church were founded in 1775 by a member of the De la Canal family, María Josefina Lina de la Canal y Hervás. In the latter 19th century, the convent was closed by the Reform Laws and it remained empty until the mid-20th century. The Escuela de Bellas Artes was established in 1938 by Peruvian Felipe Cossío del Pomar and American Stirling Dickinson. This and other art institutions began to attract American exchange students who came to study and live. The cultural center today is part of the Instituto Nacional de Bellas Artes (INBA) and is often referred to by locals as "Bellas Artes". It is a two-story cloister surrounded an extremely large courtyard with large streets and a large fountain in the middle. It houses art exhibits, classrooms for drawing, painting, sculpture, lithography, textiles, ceramics, dramatic arts, ballet, regional dance, piano and guitar.

One hall of the old convent is dedicated to a mural by David Alfaro Siqueiros along with students from the art school, but it was never finished. The complex has a museum, an auditorium, two art galleries and the Las Musas restaurant. Next to the cultural center is the Inmaculada Concepcion Church, locally known as Las Monjas (English: The Nuns). It was originally constructed as part of the convent. The church was constructed between 1755 and 1842 with an elegant cupola added by Zeferino Gutierrez in 1891, inspired by the Les Invalides in Paris. The cupola is octagonal and decorated with Corinthian columns in the lower area and the upper area has a window with a balustrade and statues of saints. Topping the cupola is a lantern window with a statue depicting the Immaculate Conception. Inside, there are paintings by Juan Rodriguez Juarez.

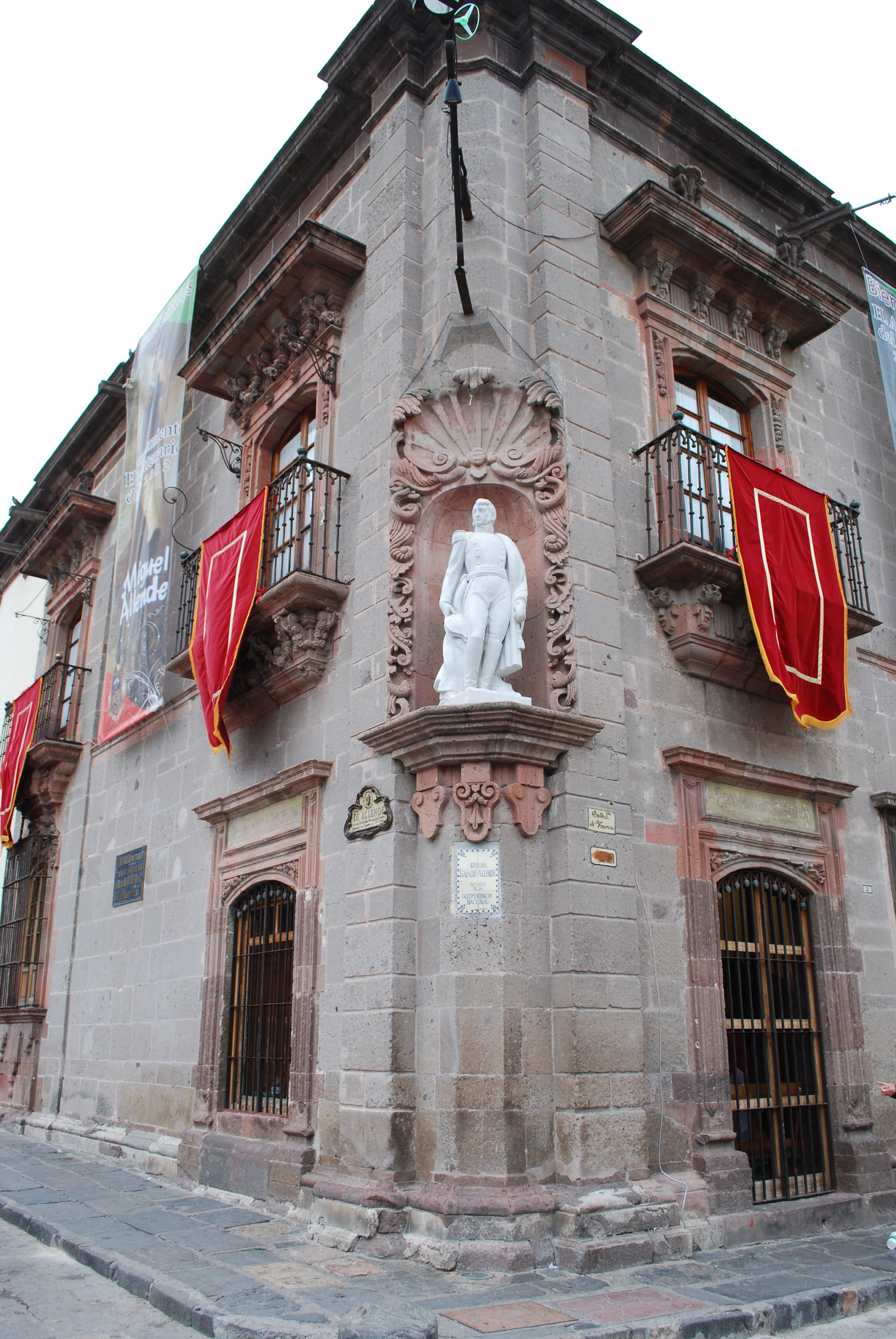
Corner of the Allende House with a statue of Ignacio Allende

The Casa de Allende (Allende House) museum was the home of Ignacio Allende, who was a principal figure in the early part of the Mexican War of Independence. The structure was built in 1759 with Baroque and Neoclassical elements, located next to the San Miguel parish church. The museum it houses is officially called the Museo Histórico de San Miguel de Allende, and it is one of many "regional museums" of Mexico. This kind of museum focuses on the history of the local area from the prehistoric period to the present, especially the area's role in Mexico's national history. The lower floor contains exhibits about the founding of the town, its role in protecting the Camino Real de Tierra Adentro Road and more. The upper floor contains exhibits related to Ignacio Allende and some of the rooms are preserved as they looked when he lived there. There are 24 rooms that chronicle the history of the area from the foundation of the town to the Ruta de la Plata (English: Silver Route), the genealogy of Ignacio Allende and the Mexican War of Independence. It was remodeled as part of the preparations for Mexico's Bicentennial. The restored museum was re-inaugurated by President Felipe Calderón in 2009.

The Casa del Mayorazgo de la Canal dates from the 18th century, constructed by Mariano Loreto de la Canal y Landeta. During the late colonial period, this house was the most important secular building, being home to the De la Canal family, one of the wealthiest in New Spain. The original construction was inspired by French and Italian palaces of the 16th to 18th centuries. The house is considered to be a transitional work between Baroque and Neoclassical, as its façade was redesigned by Manuel Tolsá in the early 19th century. The façade is Neoclassical with the coat of arms of the family. The main portal has two levels with an arch and a relief of an eagle on the keystone. The main door is profusely decorated with high reliefs. Today, it houses the Casa de Cultura de Banamex (Banamex Cultural Center), which houses a collection of historic paintings and offers diverse expositions during the year.

On the north side of the Jardin Principal is the municipal palace. It was first constructed in 1736 and called the Casa Consistorial. However, this building was heavily damaged several times since then and little of the original structure remains. The current building has two floors. It is home to what is considered to be the first "independent" or modern municipal government formed after the beginning of the Mexican War of Independence. This reestablishment of the city government under Liberal principles was done by Miguel Hidalgo, Ignacio Allende and Ignacio Aldama on 17 September 1810.

Very close to the Nuestra Señora de la Salud and Oratorios de San Felipe Neri churches is the Plaza Civica or Civic Plaza. This plaza was originally constructed in 1555 and was supposed to be the original center of the town. It is next to the Plaza de la Soledad and served as the main marketplace. Today, it has an equestrian statue of Ignacio Allende that dominates it.

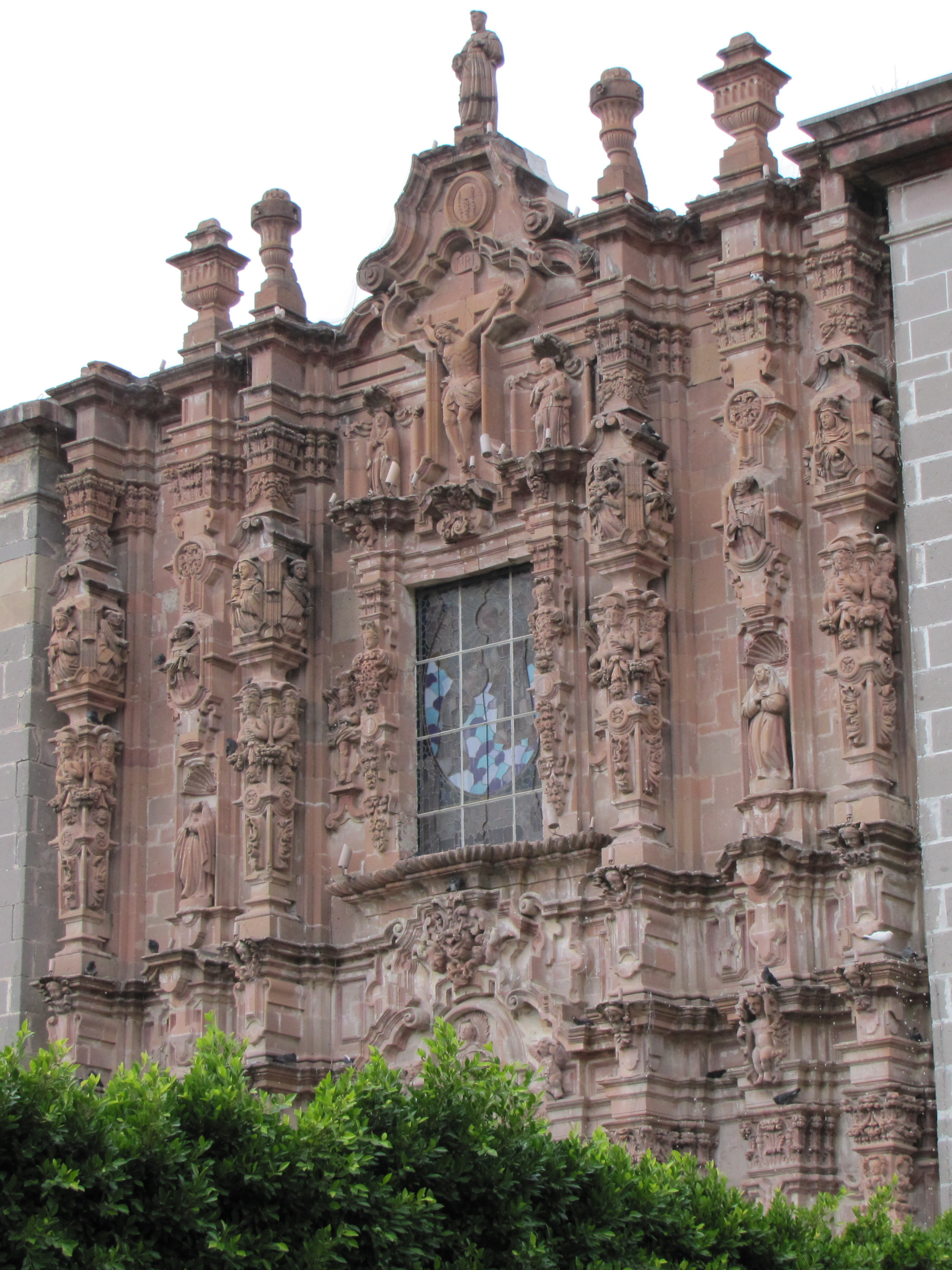
Church in San Miguel de Allende.

The San Francisco Church was begun in 1778 and was finished more than twenty years later, when architectural styles were changing. The façade is pure Churrigueresque with stone figures and fine columns. The later bell tower was constructed in 1799 in Neoclassical style by architect Francisco Eduardo Tresguerras.

The Biblioteca Pública (English: public library) serves as the community center for San Miguel's large foreigner population. This library was established by Helen Wale, a Canadian, who wanted to reach out to local children. It is the largest privately funded, publicly accessible library in Mexico with the second-largest English-language book collection. The library has a café, sponsors tours and prints a bilingual newspaper. While self-supporting, it also sponsors educational programs for local youth including scholarships, donations of school supplies and free English and computer classes for children. Its "Club de Amigos" promotes friendship between Mexicans and foreigners.

To the far south of the historic center is Parque Juárez (Juarez Park). This park was established at the beginning of the 20th century on the banks of a river in French style with fountains, decorative pools, wrought iron benches, old bridges and footpaths. There is an area for children with playground and basketball. The garden area is filled with plants and trees of the region, chirimoyos, various berries and walnuts. The water areas host a large number of herons. After dark on many days, it is possible to catch an impromptu concert by local amateur musicians. Nearby there is a small commercial center on Zacateros Street where typical of the area such as objects made of brass and glass can be found. Near here there is a fountain dedicated to Ignacio Allende.

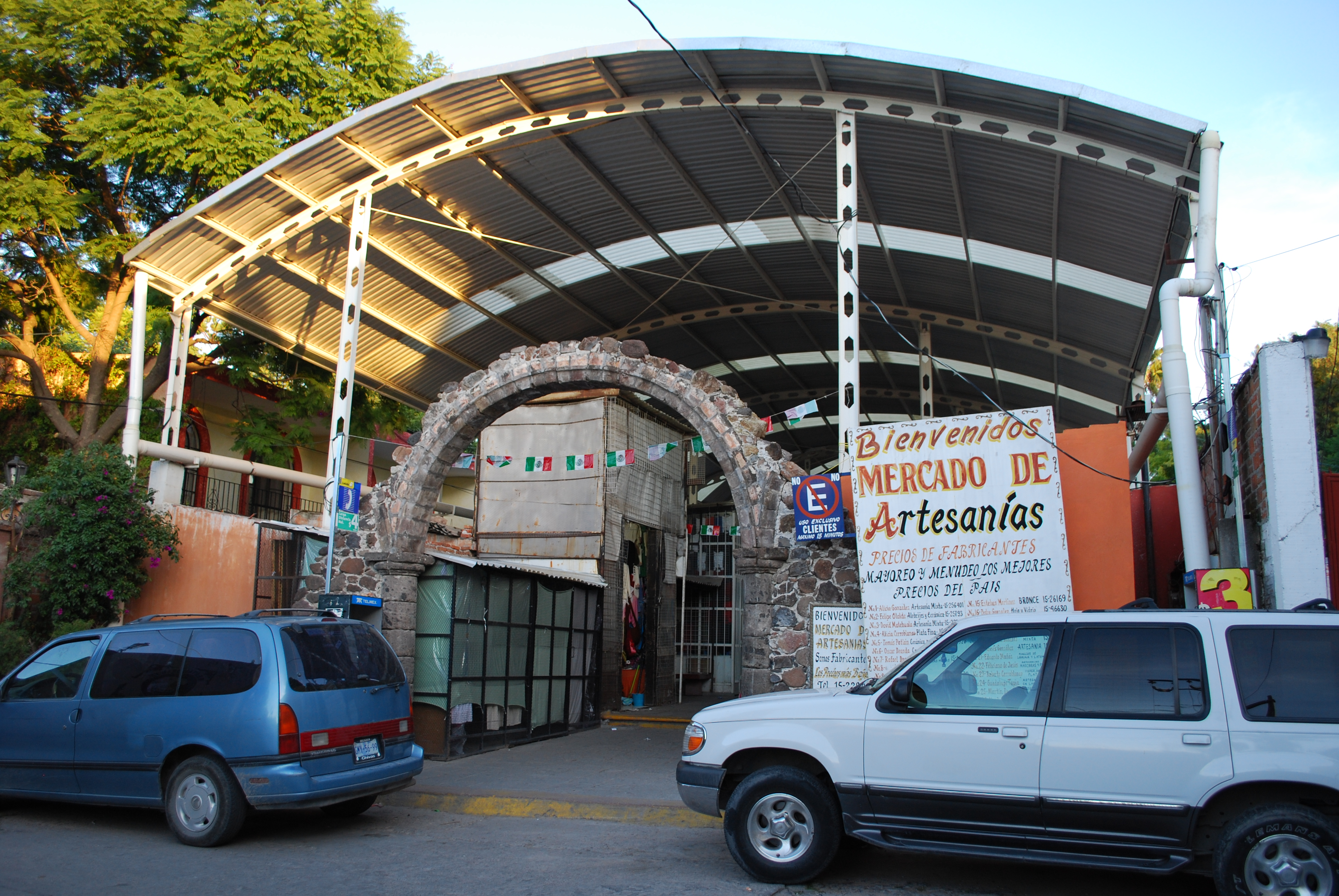
Entrance to the Mercado de Artesanías

Another important market is the Mercado de Artesanías, which sells a wide variety of items such as those made from wool, brass, paper mache and blown glass, tin and silver. One figure that features prominently on merchandise is that of a frog, as the state's name of Guanajuato means "place of frogs". The market is located in a narrow alley filling three blocks behind the city's main fruit and vegetable market. The merchandise here is more authentic and cheaper than that found around the main square.

The Institute Allende is located in an enormous complex, which the De la Canal family built as a retreat and hacienda. The old house is filled with various courtyards, a private chapel with colonial-era frescos, modern art gallery and restaurant. In 1951, it was converted into an art institute, offering courses in silverwork, ceramic and Spanish, and attracting hundreds of students each year.

Other important churches in the town include the Santo Domingo church, the Santa Cruz del Chorro Chapel, Tercera Orden Church and the San Juan de Dios Church. The Santo Domingo church was part of a monastery complex. The church has a sober façade and dates from 1737. The Santa Cruz del Chorro Chapel is one of the oldest religious buildings. The Tercera Orden Church dates from the beginning of the 17th century. The San Juan de Dios Church and San Rafael Hospital are attributed to Juan Manuel de Villegas in 1770. The complex has a main portal in sandstone with two auxiliary portals. The first has an access arch and a door made of mesquite wood, with reliefs of geometric shapes and fish, along with a hand with pomegranate in sandstone. These symbolize the Archangel Raphael and John of God. Recent research establishes the founding of San Juan de Dios complex in 1546 per maps from the Royal Library in Seville, Spain. The royal cartographers did not understand the native Mexican mapmaking methods and they had been forgotten in storage for centuries until they were brought to Mexico and San Miguel de Allende's exhibition at the Centro Cultural Los Arcos. The Camino Real (English: Royal Road is the theme of the maps, San Juan de Dios being its port-of-entry into San Miguel de Allende.

The Casa de Inquisidor (English: Inquisitor's house) is located between Hernandez Macias and Hospicio streets. It was built in 1780 with an elaborate French façade and was the seat of the inquisition in the late 18th century.

The Angela Peralta Theater was originally designed to host opera. It was inaugurated in 1873 with a performance by the most-prominent soprano of Mexico at that time, Angela Peralta. It continues to host a variety of musical events such as the Jazz Festival and the Chamber Music Festival.

Other cultural venues include the Otra Cara de Mexico, the bullring, the old train station now restored with a native market on Sundays, the casa de Marqués de Jaral de Berrio, the Casa de los Condes de Loja and the Museo de la Esquina—for traditional toys with a collection that comes from all parts of the Mexican Republic, which was gathered over 50 years' time—and Museo Interactiveo Fragua de la Independencia. La Otra Cara de Mexico (The Other Face of Mexico) is a small private museum sponsored by Bill Levasseuro, which has a large number of masks from Mexico's traditional cultures. On Calle de Recreo is the bullring that was constructed at the end of the 19th century. The old train station was part of the Mexico City–Laredo (Tamaulipas) line of the Ferrocarril Nacional Mexicano. This line was constructed in the 1880s with service beginning in 1888. The Casa del Marqués de Jaral de Berrio was constructed at the end of the 17th century as well as the Casa de los Condes de Loja. The Museo Interactivo Fragua de la Independencia (Fire of Independence Interactive Museum) is dedicated to the Mexican War of Independence and San Miguel's role in it.

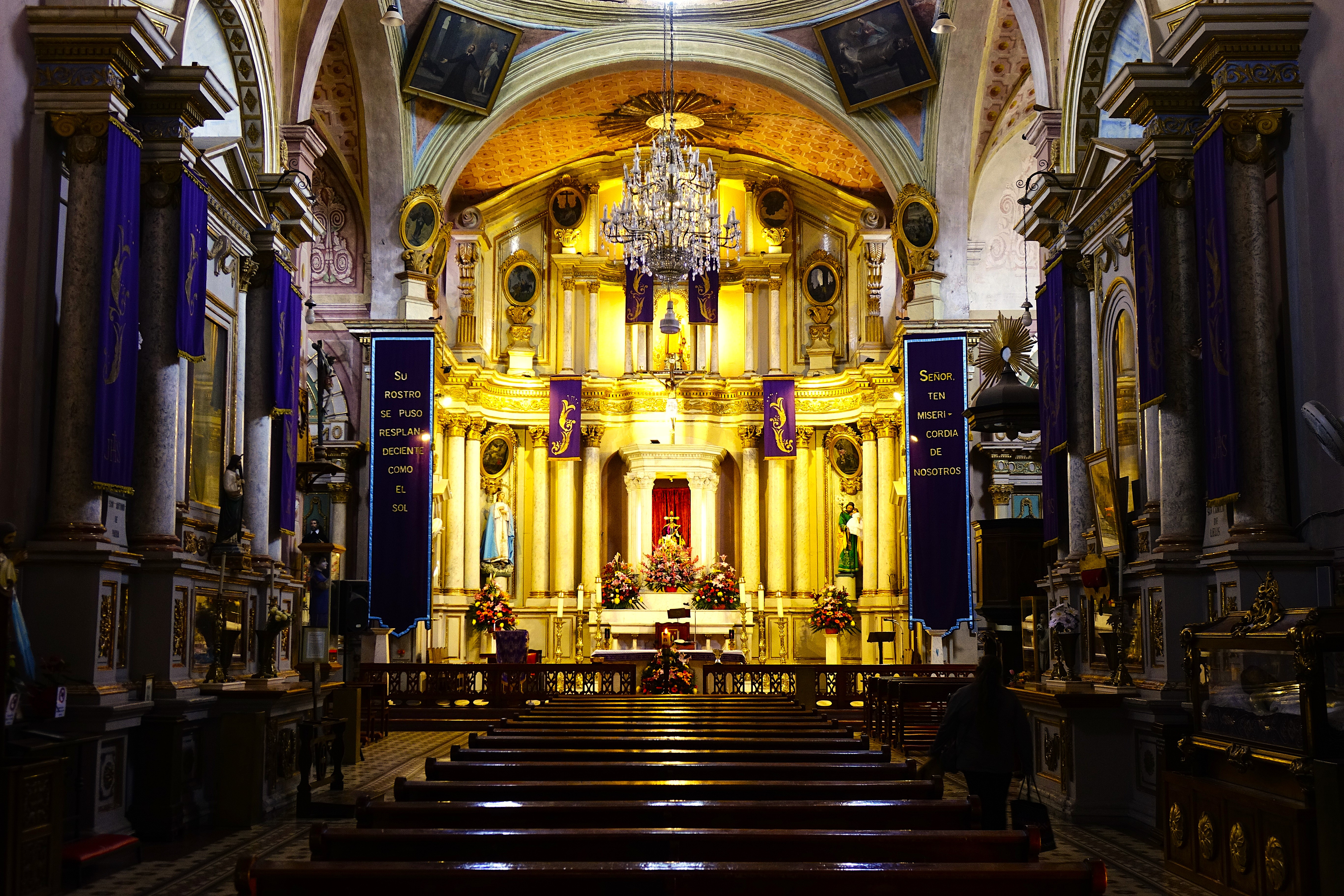
Oratorio of San Felipe Neri, interior

The Oratorio de San Felipe Neri Church was built by Juan Antonio Perez Espinosa in 1712. This church was partially built by incorporating a former chapel used by the mulatto population of the town. That church became the chapel on the east side. The façade is of pink sandstone in Baroque style with profuse vegetative ornamentation. The decorative work of the portal also contains indigenous influences. The interior of the church has a number of paintings by Miguel Cabrera, including one of the Virgin of Guadalupe signed by him. The sacristy contains this last painting along with others depicting the life of Philip Neri. This room is cordoned off by a grate covered with leather from Córdoba, Spain. At the back there is a Baroque chamber/chapel dedicated to the Virgin of Loreto. This chapel was sponsored by Manuel Tomás de la Canal in 1735. It is richly decorated with three altars covered in gold leaf and is a replica of the Basilica della Santa Casa (English: Basilica of the Holy House) of Loreto, Italy.

=== Outside the historic core zone ===
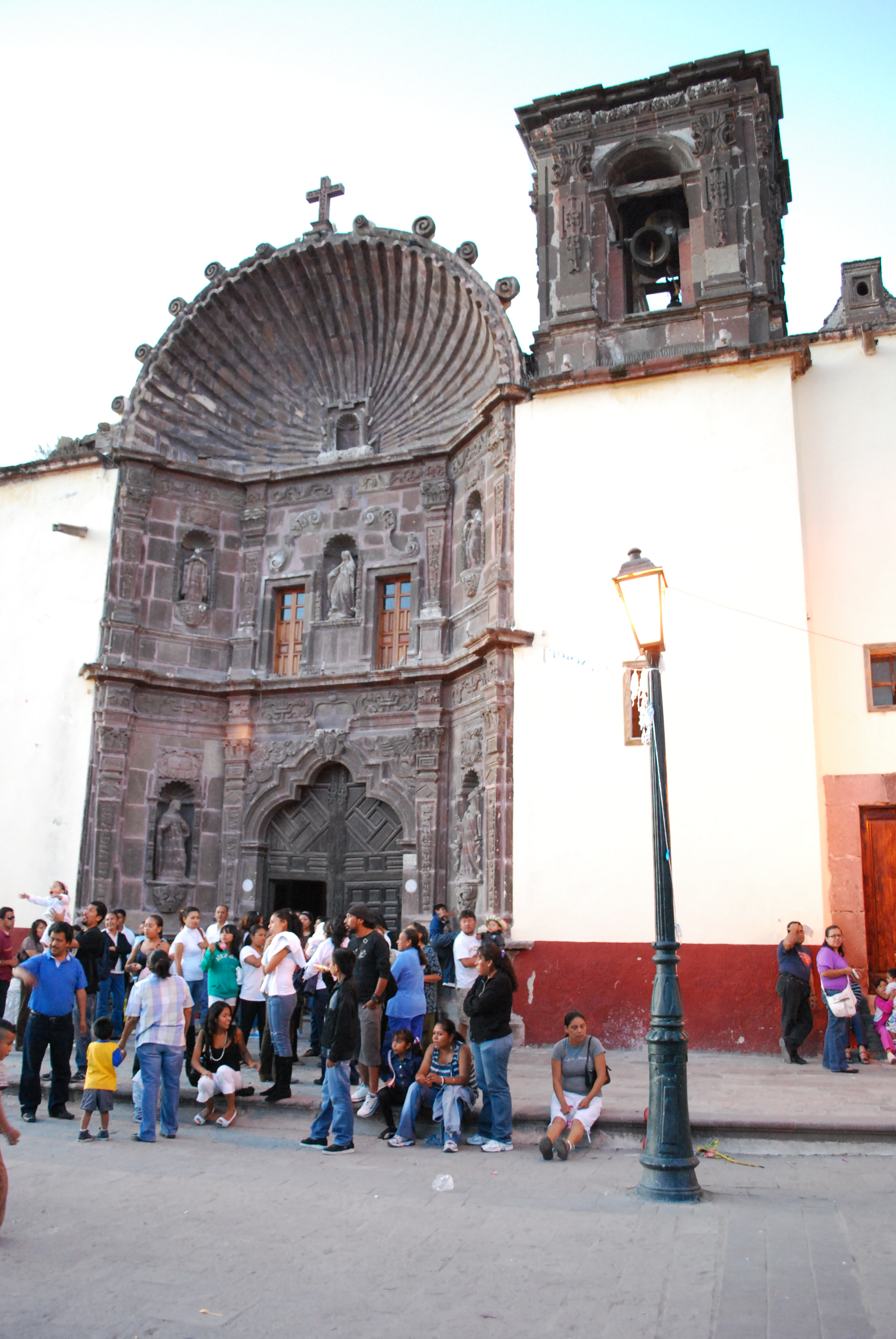
Main portal of the Nuestra Señora de la Salud Church

The Nuestra Señora de la Salud Church was built by Luis Felipe Neri in the 18th century. The main portal is in Churrigueresque (Spanish Baroque) style with two levels and a crest in the shape of a large seashell. The first level has an arch flanked by pilasters and niches with sculptures of the Sacred Heart and John the Evangelist. The interior has a layout of a Latin cross covered with vaults with side walls covered in oil paintings done by Agapito Ping between 1721 and 1785. One altar contains an image of Christ, the Good Shepherd, defending his sheep from various dangers including a group of unicorns. The church served as the chapel of the Colegio de San Francisco de Sales next door. The Colegio de San Francisco de Sales was as important as the college of San Ildefonso in Mexico City in the 18th century. Both Ignacio Aldama and Ignacio Allende attended school here.

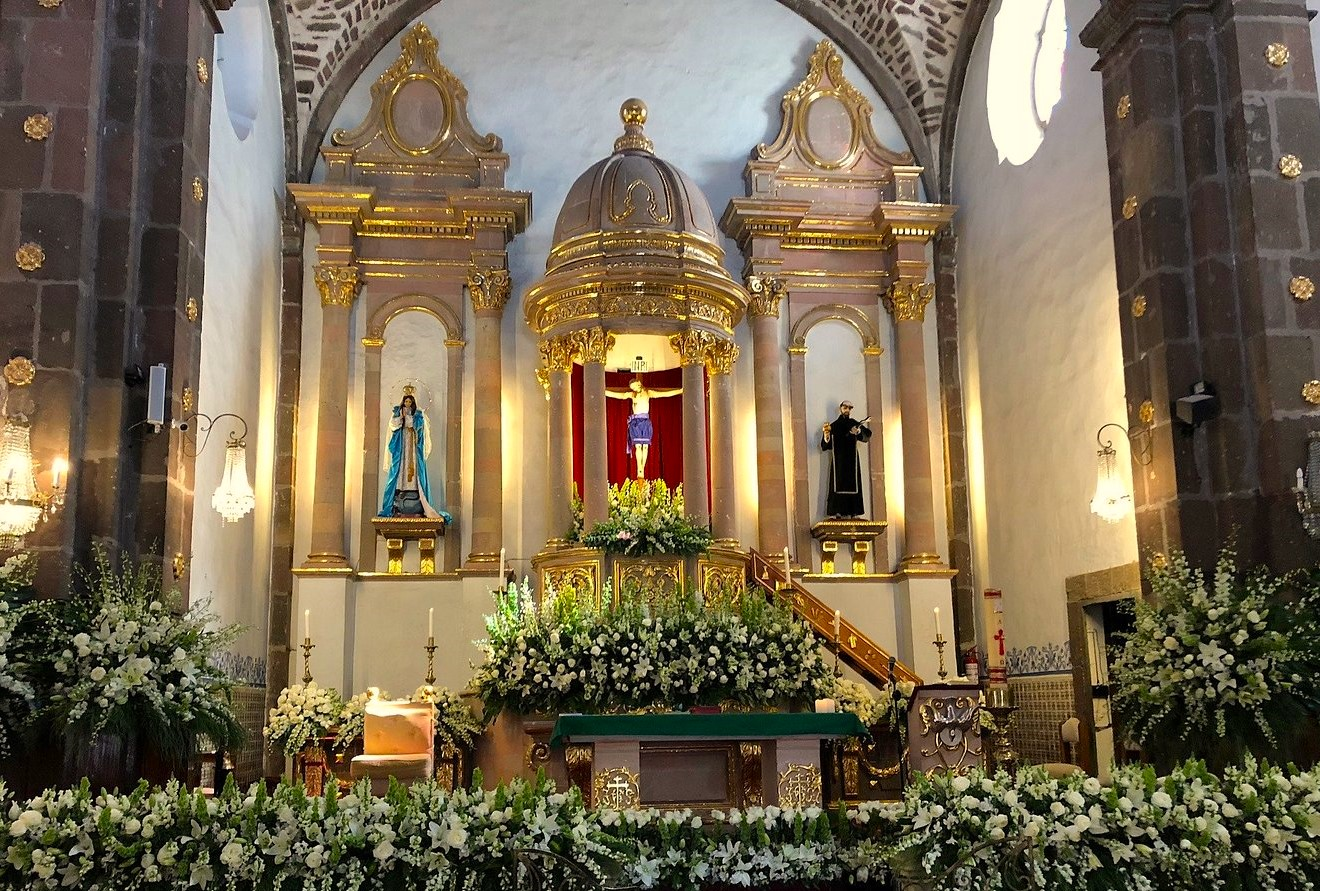
The Templo de San Juan de Dios

Built in 1770, Templo de San Juan de Dios in the Barrio de San Juan features a churrigueresque-influenced front. It was adjacent to a hospital or sanitarium for the poor, built earlier. In 1770, the religious order of San Juan de Dios took over operation of the Antiguo Real hospital. The building is now used for other purposes.

The El Charco del Ingenio Botanic Garden holds various specimens including cactuses from the surrounding area.

Outside of the city one can find an Otomi archaeological site, Cañada de la Virgen.

== Geography ==
The city of San Miguel de Allende is in the state of Guanajuato and lies 119 km (74 mi) east of Guanajuato, Guanajuato. It is centrally located within the municipality of San Miguel de Allende, 64 km (40 mi) northwest of Queretaro and 288 km (179 mi) northwest of Mexico City.

The city is located at a nexus of four arroyos: El Atascadero, Las Cachinches, La Cañadita and El Obraje. The last of these, El Obraje, collects water in a dam of the same name. Several dams are located in the municipality to control the flow of rivers and manage the water supply. The most important of these is the Ignacio Allende Dam.

=== Climate ===
Climate data for San Miguel de Allende (1991–2020, extremes 1951-present)
Month	Jan	Feb	Mar	Apr	May	Jun	Jul	Aug	Sep	Oct	Nov	Dec	Year
Record high °C (°F)	34.5 (94.1)	35.5 (95.9)	38.0 (100.4)	39.0 (102.2)	39.6 (103.3)	39.0 (102.2)	36.8 (98.2)	36.0 (96.8)	37.0 (98.6)	37.0 (98.6)	34.5 (94.1)	32.5 (90.5)	39.6 (103.3)
Mean daily maximum °C (°F)	22.4 (72.3)	24.6 (76.3)	27.9 (82.2)	30.0 (86.0)	30.8 (87.4)	28.8 (83.8)	27.2 (81.0)	27.3 (81.1)	26.2 (79.2)	25.3 (77.5)	24.1 (75.4)	23.0 (73.4)	26.5 (79.7)
Daily mean °C (°F)	13.5 (56.3)	15.4 (59.7)	18.3 (64.9)	20.7 (69.3)	22.0 (71.6)	21.1 (70.0)	20.0 (68.0)	20.1 (68.2)	19.2 (66.6)	17.8 (64.0)	15.9 (60.6)	14.0 (57.2)	18.2 (64.8)
Mean daily minimum °C (°F)	4.6 (40.3)	6.3 (43.3)	8.7 (47.7)	11.4 (52.5)	13.2 (55.8)	13.4 (56.1)	12.8 (55.0)	12.9 (55.2)	12.3 (54.1)	10.3 (50.5)	7.7 (45.9)	5.1 (41.2)	9.9 (49.8)
Record low °C (°F)	−3 (27)	−8 (18)	−1 (30)	1.5 (34.7)	6.0 (42.8)	8.0 (46.4)	6.5 (43.7)	7.0 (44.6)	4.0 (39.2)	−2 (28)	−6 (21)	−5 (23)	−8 (18)
Average precipitation mm (inches)	15.9 (0.63)	11.3 (0.44)	13.1 (0.52)	14.0 (0.55)	40.0 (1.57)	114.7 (4.52)	146.8 (5.78)	98.6 (3.88)	109.4 (4.31)	43.2 (1.70)	19.3 (0.76)	5.5 (0.22)	631.8 (24.87)
Average precipitation days (≥ 0.1 mm)	2.4	1.9	2.2	2.4	5.6	10.7	13.4	9.0	9.9	5.5	2.7	1.7	67.4
Source: Servicio Meteorologico Nacional

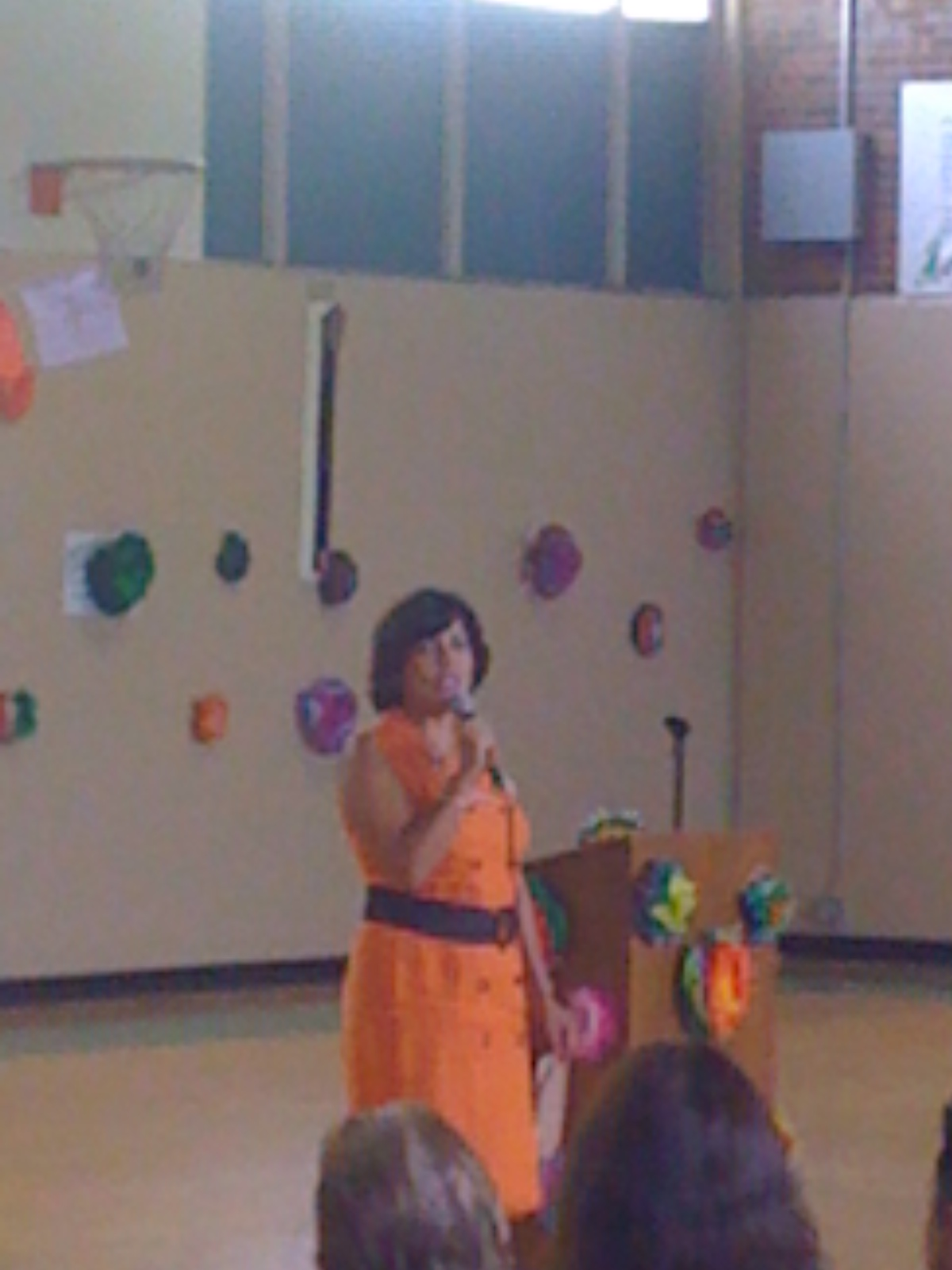
Former Mayor of San Miguel de Allende, Luz María Núñez Flores (spring 2012)

San Miguel de Allende

Climate chart (precipitation, max. and min. temperature)
J	F	M	A	M	J	J	A	S	O	N	D
14 23 6	7.2 25 7	6 29 10	19 30 12	42 31 14	100 29 14	129 27 14	94 27 14	94 26 14	42 26 11	13 25 8	6.5 23 6
- █ Average max. and min. temperatures in °C
- █ Precipitation totals in mm
- Source: SMN
Imperial conversion
J	F	M	A	M	J	J	A	S	O	N	D
0.5 73 43	0.3 77 45	0.2 83 50	0.7 86 54	1.7 87 57	3.9 84 58	5.1 81 57	3.7 81 57	3.7 79 56	1.6 78 52	0.5 76 47	0.3 74 44
- █ Average max. and min. temperatures in °F
- █ Precipitation totals in inches

=== Foreign influence ===
According to biographer John Virtue, "Stirling Dickinson is without doubt the person most responsible for San Miguel de Allende becoming an international art center". Although only an amateur painter himself, Dickinson became co-founder and director of the Escuela Universitaria de Bellas Artes, an art institute that he opened in a former convent only a few months after his arrival.

Due to its growth as a tourist destination, some of the most obvious culture seen on the streets of the town relates to visitors, both foreign and Mexican. To cater to these visitors, the town contains cafes, boutiques, art galleries, upscale restaurants and hotels, and a wide variety of bars and nightclubs. Bars and nightclubs range from DJs or loud bands catering to young people, to jazz clubs, sports bars and even those that specialize in traditional Mexican music such as mariachi. Some were founded by foreigners and reflect that ownership, for example the Berlin Bar & Bistro. Just outside Centro, the avant-garde 'black box' Shelter Theater offers open mic, live concerts, films and intimate theater shows, mostly in English.

Shops around the Jardín Principal sell art, handcrafts, furniture and decorative items. The Fabrica La Aurora is an old textile mill that has been converted into galleries and shops selling art, furnishings and antiques; it has a lot of open space along with a café and restaurant. San Miguel has several schools for learning Spanish, most catering to foreign visitors. These include the Instituto Allende (with credits transferable to US or Canadian colleges), Language Point and Warren Hardy Spanish. Some universities such as the University of Texas-Pan American offer study abroad programs in the city, not only in Spanish but also in the arts, literature and creative writing.

=== Festivals ===
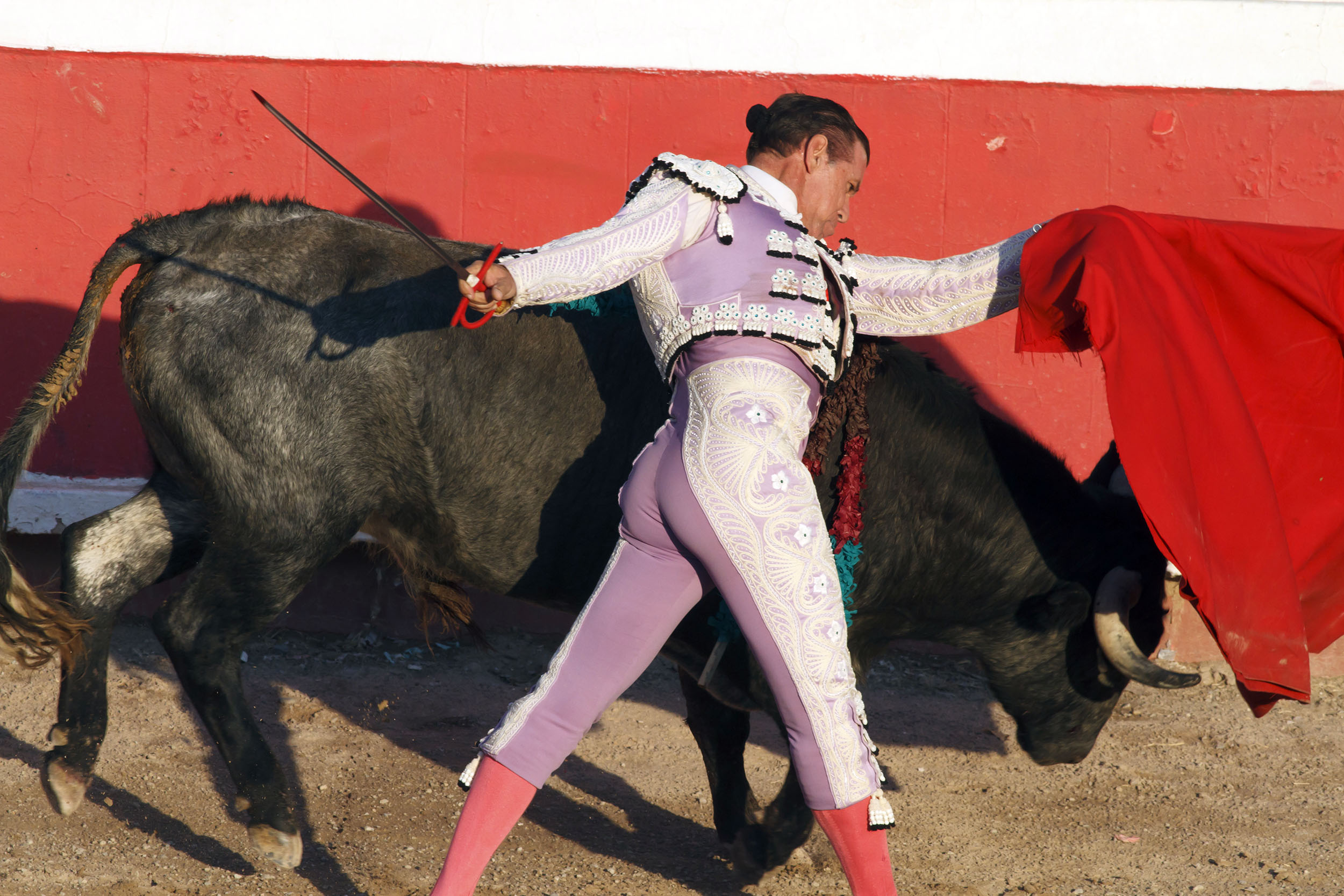
A bullfighter in the San Miguel arena

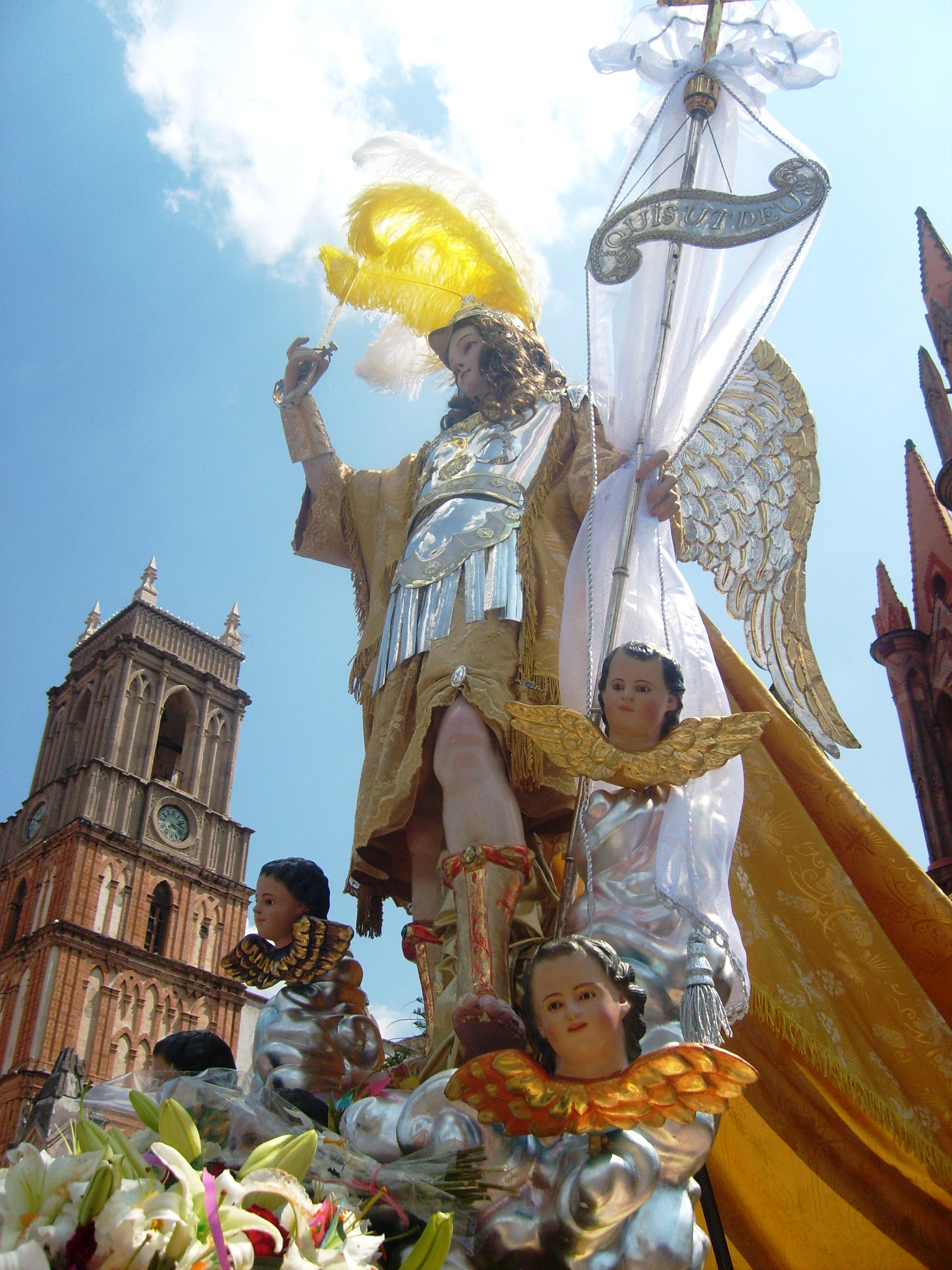
Fiesta de San Miguel Arcángel.

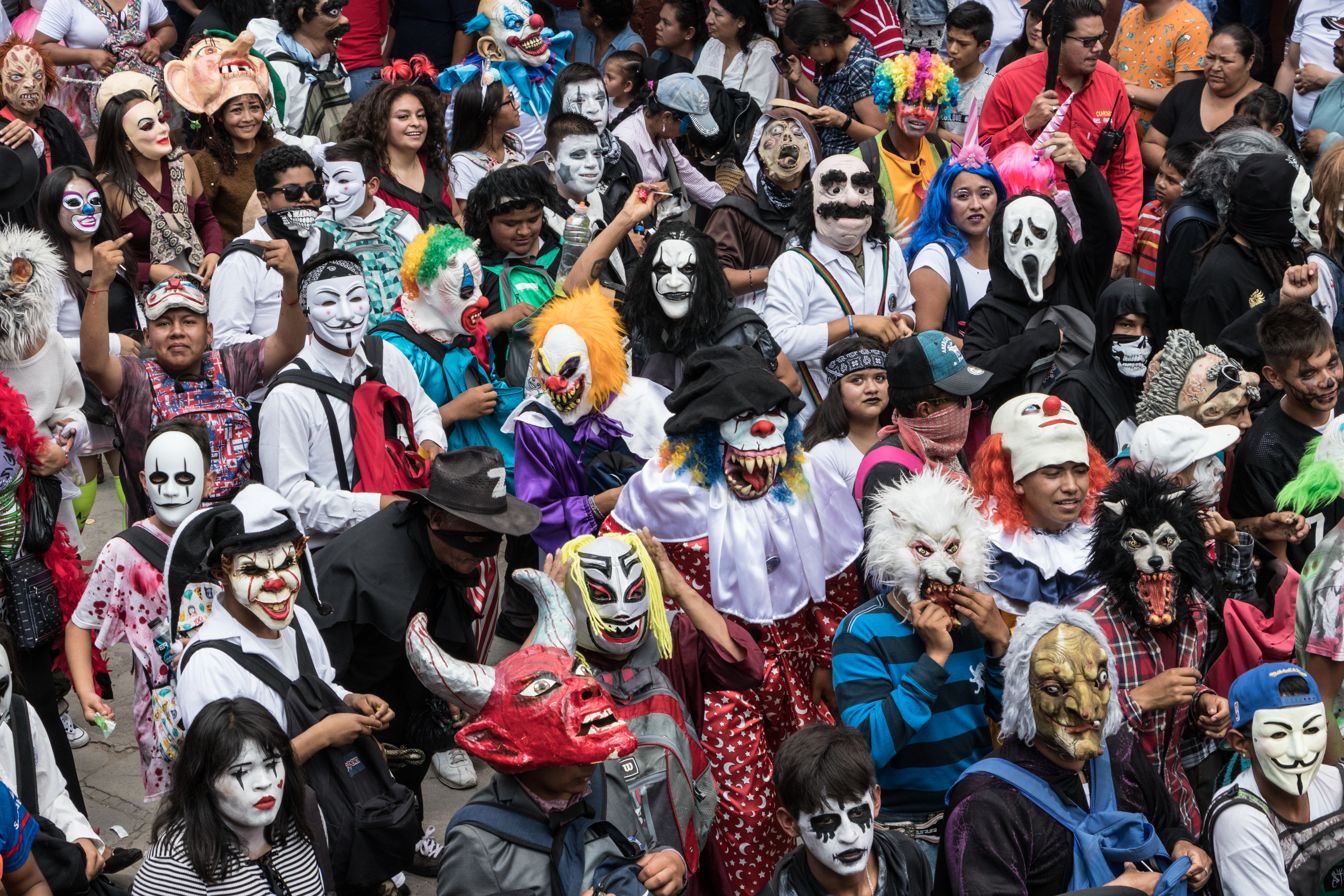
Desfile de los Locos

At one time, bullfights were a frequent occurrence but by 2026, were held only about six times per year (usually at the time of festivals or other events) at the historic Plaza de Toros Oriente.

Many of the festivals are purely Mexican, combining social activity with religious expression. Throughout the year there are pilgrimages, all-night vigils, ringing church bells, processions and fireworks. The largest celebration of the year is that of the town's patron saint, the Archangel Michael. The angel's feast day is 29 September, but festivities take place for an entire week. Activities include private parties, sporting events, cultural events, indigenous dance and more. The week is popularly called the Fiestas de San Miguel de Allende. The finale is a procession of the actual image of St. Michael, usually high on the main altar of La Paroquia, taken on a flower-covered dais to "visit" the main churches in the historic district. Fireworks are a part of all festivities. Elaborate structures that spin and light in sequence, called "castillos"—castles—are installed in the esplanade at the Jardín, and sometimes at other churches in town.

Conchero dancers during La Conquista (or Lord of the Conquest) are a highlight of the most significant indigenous festival

Concheros

Each year, concheros or "Chichimeca" from nearby towns dance to drums in pre-Hispanic regalia, on the first Thursday and Friday of March. The event is in honor of "Christ of the Conquest". This Christ is an ancient statue created of corn stalks and orchid bulbs. One source states that the festivities "represent the acceptance of Christ by the indigenous peoples ... a way of preserving indigenous heritage after the Catholic conquest in Mexico".

Holy Week events begin early, with an exhibition of altars dedicated to the Virgin of Sorrows. Stores and families build these, a week before Good Friday.

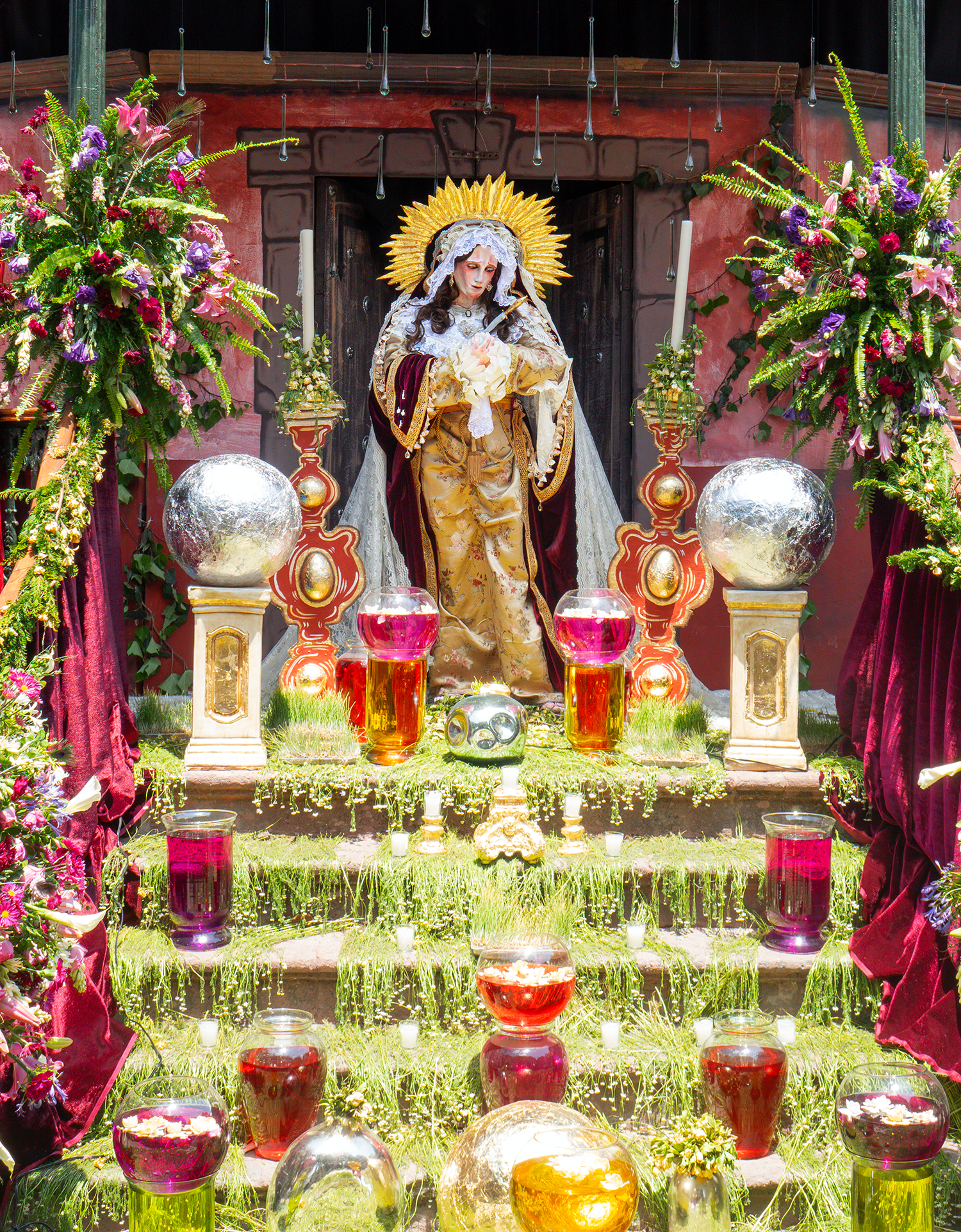
One of the altars during the Friday of Sorrows

Good Friday includes the Procession of Silence after a reenactment of the judgment of Jesus by Pontius Pilate on one side of the San Miguel Parish church. The procession represents the 14 scenes of the Passion before the crucifixion. Many of the townspeople participate in the event, with children dressed as angels and adults in period clothing carrying statues of Jesus. The procession winds its way along the main streets of the historic center completely in silence. Another large religious celebration is the feast of Nuestro Señor de la Columna.

There are also secular and cultural festivals during the year. The annual Festival de Música de Cámara or Chamber Music Festival occurs each year in August in the city's historic center. One of the purposes of the event is to bring this type of music to streets and other public venues as well as traditional concert halls such as the event's home, the Angela Peralta Theater. Other events include the Jornada de Cultura Cubana in March, the Festival de Tìteres in April, the Festival de Convivencia y Hermandad Universal in May, the Desfile de Locos in June, the Festival Expressiones Cortos in July, the Feria Nacional de Lana y Latón and the festival de Jazz y Blues in November and the Festival de San Miguel de Allende in December. The most important political celebration is the reenactment of the "Grito de Dolores", as the original occurred in the nearby town of Dolores Hidalgo, marking the beginning of the Mexican War of Independence. As the birthplace of Ignacio Allende, the town was a focal point of 2010s Bicentennial celebrations with reenactments of events such as the arrival of the message from Querétaro from Josefa Ortiz. Bicentennial celebrations also included events such as the Ballet Mazatl. Festivities were concentrated in and around the Jardín Principal, the Ignacio Allende House and the Centro Cultural.

SMART is a multi-media cultural festival, held annually in May, that combines exhibits by Mexican artists with a variety of culinary and social events at local hotels, including the festival founder Hotel Matilda, Dos Casas Hotel and L'Otel.

=== Arts, music and literature ===
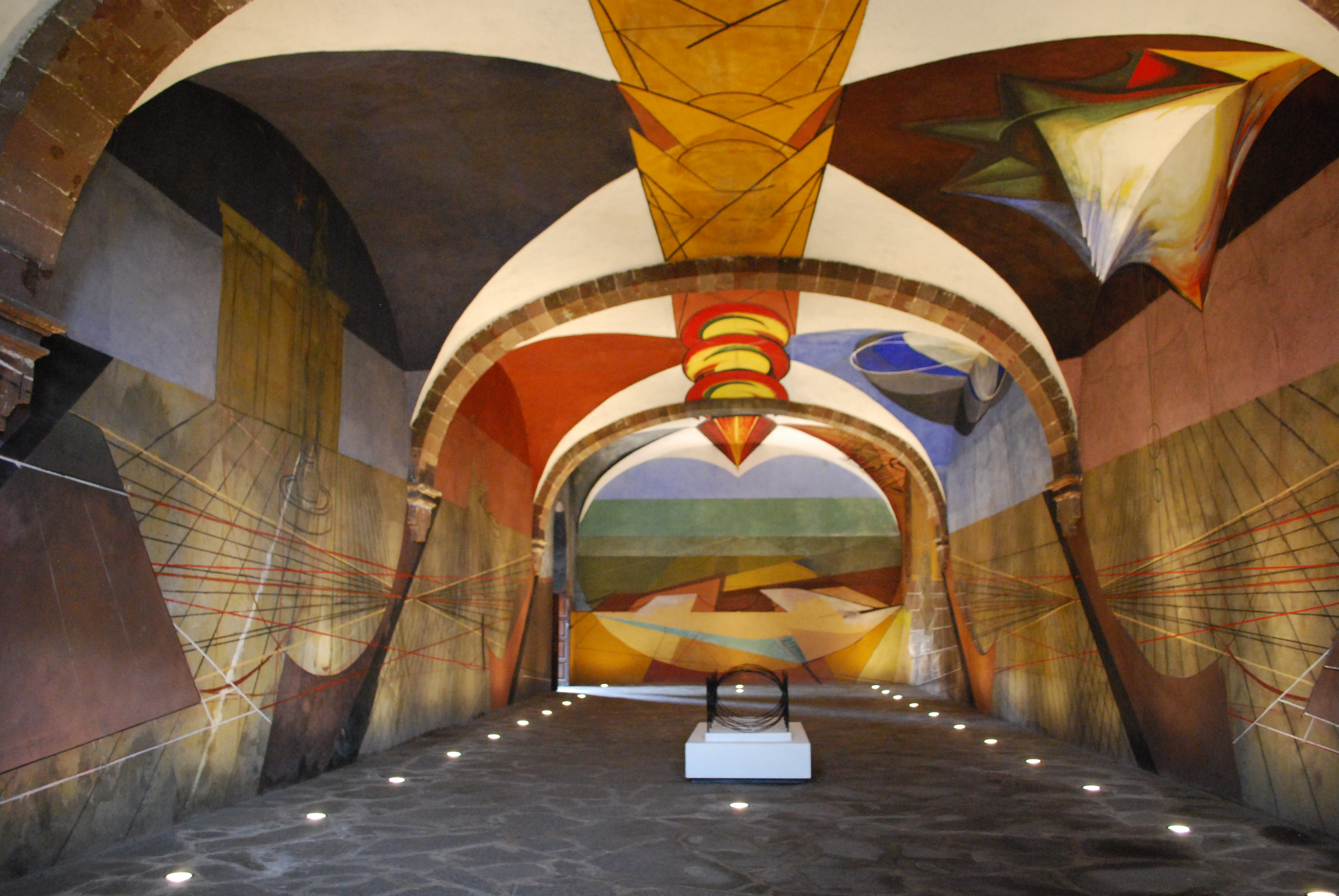
View of the room containing the unfinished Siqueiros mural

San Miguel de Allende has long had a reputation as a haven for visual artists. In the Spanish colonial period, San Miguel was the largest recipient of funding for the arts. The city was full of rich arts patrons from the start in the 1500s. Rich Spanish families such as the Condes de la Canal paid for the sumptuous Chapel of Loreto and employed artists in all aspects including baroque music compositions. A fragment of that musical past is used in the Holy Week music accompanying the celebration of mass around Easter. Religious and secular music continues to be a focal point, with the English composer and pianist Michael Hoppe performing frequently.

Since the 1950s, when Diego Rivera and David Alfaro Siqueiros worked there, it has attracted professional and amateur painters, sculptors and printmakers to frequent classes and workshops. In addition to two major art institutions (Instituto Allende and Bellas Artes), artists and art venues can be seen in various parts of the town. It is not unusual to see sketch artists working on the street and selling their work. Some notable immigrant painters associated with San Miguel are Canadians Mai Onno, principal painting professor in the Bellas Artes founding school of the arts, Toller Cranston, Marion Perlet, Gary Slipper, Mack Reynolds, and Andrew Osta. More recently, the town has been attracting writers, film makers, and musicians. The town annually hosts an important free film festival, the GIFF. One annual event that caters to the writing community is the Writers' Conference, which brings together authors, editors and literary agents. The 2009 event attracted names such as Erica Jong, Todd Gitlen and Josephine Humphreys. Writers have lived here since the mid 20th century. Beat poet Neal Cassady died on the railroad tracks just outside town.

Billy Collins's poem "The Symphony Orchestra of San Miguel de Allende", in his collection Whale Day, describes the city's inspirational ambience whose "church bells, roosters, doves and barking dogs" predate the brass, strings and woodwinds of that comprise the more typical instruments of the modern orchestra. Other writers who have lived or spent time here include W.D. Snodgrass, Beverly Donofrio, Sandra Gulland, Tony Cohan, Joe Persico, Gary Jennings, Vance Packard, Lynette Seator, Richard Gabrio and Dianna Hutts. Some have written books about the town, such as Elisa Bernick who wrote The Family Sabbatical Handbook: The Budget Guide To Living Abroad With Your Family and Rue who wrote "My Favorite Second Chance" (Book 2 of The Lake Effect Series). Another writing event is Poetry Week, which began in 1997. Barbara Faith, a well-known author of romance books lived in San Miguel with her husband Alfonso Covarrubias. The biggest writers' conference in Latin America takes place in San Miguel annually. The San Miguel Poetry Week was founded in 1997 by Jennifer Clement and Barbara Sibley and takes place in early January. Leading poets from Mexico, the US and UK meet for poetry workshops and readings.

=== Film ===
San Miguel began hosting film and television production in the 1940s. Columbia Pictures produced the first Hollywood film to feature the town, filming The Brave Bulls in 1950. Disney set The Littlest Outlaw in San Miguel and MGM filmed scenes for two westerns, Guns for San Sebastian and Hour of the Gun. Mexican productions included the telenovela Los caudillos and Jose Mojica's Yo pescador. In addition to Mojica, Cantinflas and Anthony Quinn established residences in San Miguel.

== Economy ==
=== Tourism and commerce ===
Much of the municipality's economy is tied to the influx of tourists and foreigners who come to live, mostly retirees. In 2002, 250,000 visitors spent about US$8.4 million at the town's attractions, but those who live here contribute far more to the economy. Most of this is concentrated in the town of San Miguel proper. It accounts for over 36% of the municipality's jobs and most of the municipality's income. Tourism accounts for almost all of the municipality's income from outside. This began in the mid-20th century as a cheap place to live; however, despite recent economic downturns, it no longer is. This has not lessened San Miguel's attraction for foreign visitors and retirees as homes and hotels here are still significantly less expensive than in the US or Europe. Despite not having a casino or an airport and being 640 kilometres (400 mi) from the nearest beach, this small city has been ranked by magazines such as Travel and Leisure and Condé Nast Traveler as a preferred place to live and visit.

Hotel occupancy typically reaches 80% on weekends with about 50% occupancy on weekdays, when rates can be about half. Most visitors are vacationers and about 60% are domestic visitors, interested in the town's history and role in the Mexican War of Independence. Other attractions for visitors are the two main art/cultural institutions of Instituto Allende and Bellas Artes as well as a number of Spanish-language schools. Most domestic visitors come from Mexico's large urban centers like Mexico City, Guadalajara, Monterrey and Querétaro. This growth has spurred the development of newer hotels, resort and vacation home developments, especially on the corridor between San Miguel and Atotonilco. There are 149 hotels, 9 of which are 5-star. The town has just over 9% of all hotel rooms in the state, and this percentage is growing. Another important sector is restaurants. In 2006, the town invested 800,000 pesos to implement an online marketing plan to increase services to potential tourists.

=== Agriculture ===
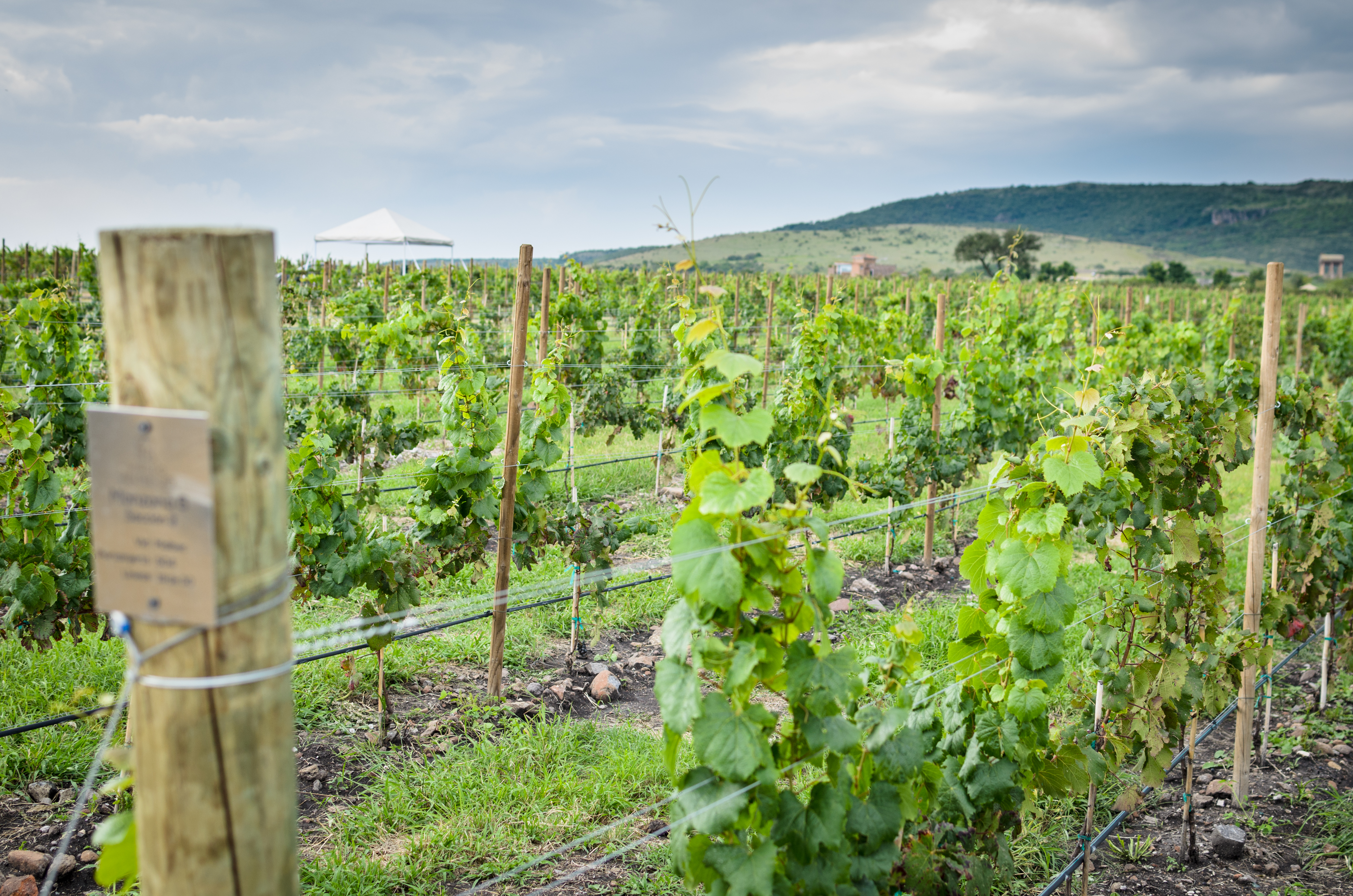
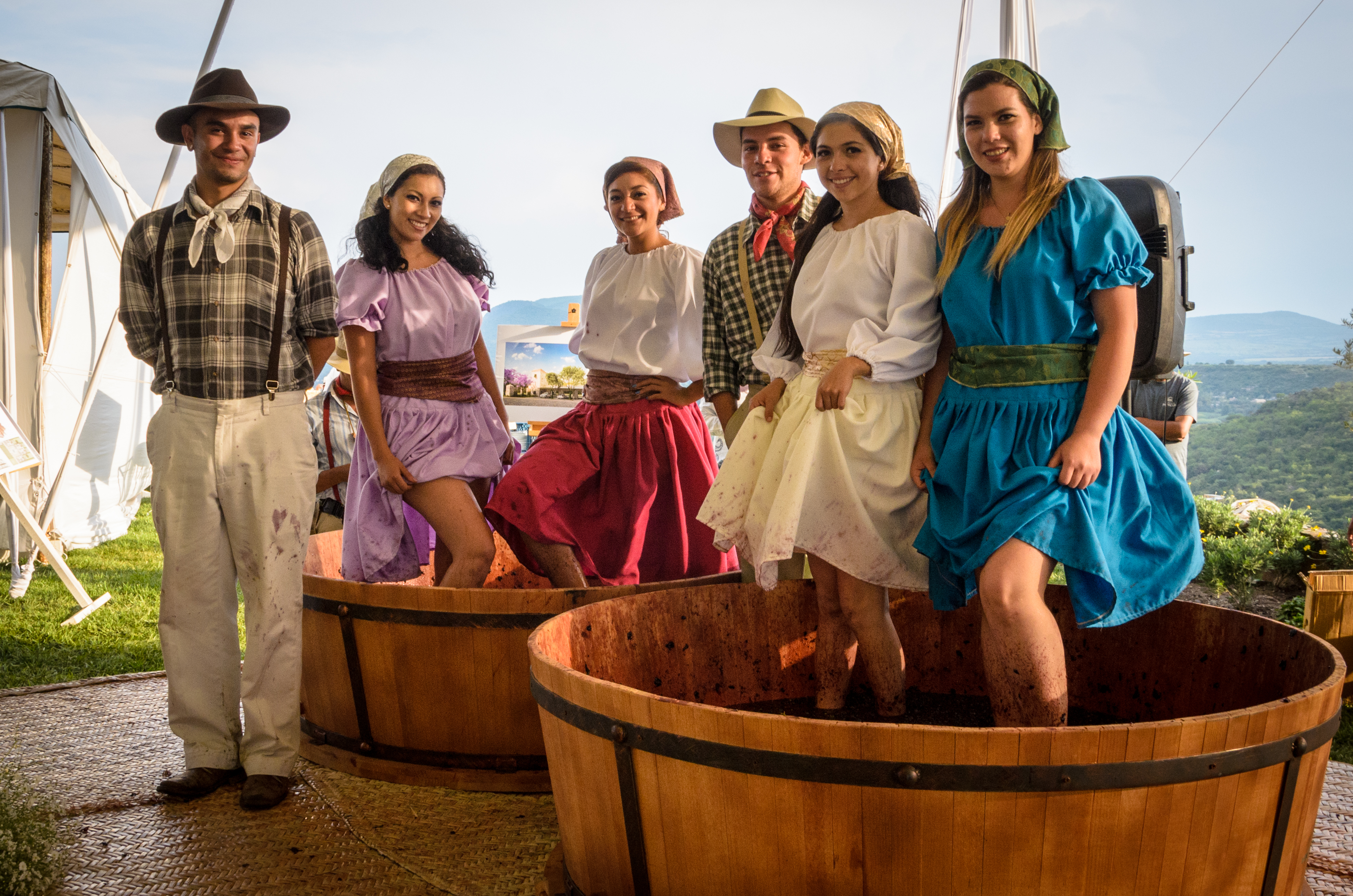
Vineyards and vendimia celebration near San Miguel de Allende.

Outside of the town of San Miguel, the economy is more traditional. A bit over half of the land is used for grazing with 37% used for crops. Over 80% of the crops are grown during the rainy season with less than 20% grown on irrigated lands. Forestry is minimal. Agriculture produces 25% of the employment in the municipality. Principal crops include corn, beans, wheat, and alfalfa, which account for 84% of harvests. Another important agricultural activity is fruit orchards. The most important livestock is domestic fowl, especially poultry. The municipality raises over 12% of the state's chickens. Another important product is honey, of which the municipality provides 7.5% of the state's total. Since the 1990s, there have been active reforestation efforts to replace much of what was lost previously to logging.

=== Industry ===
Industry is not as well developed here as in other parts of the state although it provides about 33% of the jobs. One important industry is the production of electrical energy. Other industries include metal products, food processing, wood products and mineral processing. The area is known for the crafting of objects from brass and glass. Two notable artisans here are the brothers Marcelino and Abeck Leon Rosa, who produce handmade glass items. They began producing pieces in the courtyard of their home, but today they have a studio with two large workshops and operate a school for glassmakers, which trains about 50 people per year. One of their specialties is Tiffany-style lamps.

Since at least the 1950s, San Miguel de Allende is a backdrop for the production of films and television programs. Both Mexican and foreign productions and advertisements have been filmed there. Projects that have been filmed here include Once Upon a Time in Mexico, a television biopic of the Francisco "Pancho" Villa, and The Mask of Zorro II. A group of entrepreneurs is working to increase the town's reputation as a film location, opening a privately financed studio complex called The Film Colony. Recently, U.S. television series Royal Pains, Top Chef and Million Dollar Listing have filmed episodes in the town.

== Notable people ==
- Ignacio Allende (b. 1769), Captain of the Spanish army and leader in the Mexican War of Independence
- Sandra Cisneros (b. 1954), American writer

== Twin towns – sister cities ==
San Miguel de Allende is twinned with:

- Acquaviva delle Fonti, Italy
- Cusco, Peru
- La Habra, California, United States
- Laredo, Texas, United States
- Redlands, California, United States
- Santa Fe, New Mexico, United States
- St. Augustine, Florida, United States
- Tyler, Texas, United States
- Ushuaia, Argentina
- West Palm Beach, Florida, United States
- Vail, Colorado, United States
