= Josephine Humphreys =

American novelist

- Born: February 2, 1945 (age 81); Charleston, South Carolina, U.S.
- Occupation: Novelist
- Writing career
- Period: 1984–present
- Genres: Southern literature Historical fiction

Josephine Humphreys (born February 2, 1945) is an American novelist.

== Early life ==
Josephine Humphreys grew up in Charleston, South Carolina, with her mother, father and two sisters. Her father worked as the director of the Charleston development board. Her mother worked for the Charleston Museum. Humphreys was encouraged to write by her grandmother Neta, and later by her mother. All the books she read were inherited from her grandparents or came from the public library. After graduating from high school, she attended Duke University because her father believed it was a "southern college" and he was against her attending any "northern school." Her class was the first racially integrated undergraduate class.

== Career ==
Charleston, South Carolina is the setting of her novels Dreams of Sleep, Rich in Love and The Fireman's Fair, Humphreys was educated at Ashley Hall (Class of 1963), studied creative writing with Reynolds Price at Duke University (A.B., 1967), and attended Yale University (M.A., 1968) and the University of Texas. She held fellowships from the Woodrow Wilson Foundation and the Danforth Foundation. From 1970 to 1977, before beginning her writing career, she taught English in Charleston.

While her first three novels are mainly about contemporary family life in the southern United States, her fourth, Nowhere Else on Earth, is a departure in that it is an historical novel based on the true story of Rhoda Strong and Henry Berry Lowrie from the American Civil War era. It won the Southern Book Award in 2001.

Rich in Love, probably her best-known novel, was made into a 1992 film of the same title.

Humphreys was the winner of the 1984 Hemingway Foundation/PEN Award for Dreams of Sleep and the recipient of a Guggenheim Fellowship, the Lyndhurst Prize, and the American Academy of Arts and Letters Award in Literature.

== Novel Inspiration ==
Many of Humphreys' novels have been inspired by the landscape of Charleston and from her own life. Most books represent a form of family and community, and they reflect how Charleston has changed from when she was a child to now. Fireman's Fair was rewritten in three months because of the hurricane and its significant impact on the landscape.

== Novels ==
- Dreams of Sleep (1984)
- Rich in Love (1987)
- The Fireman's Fair (1991)
- Nowhere Else on Earth (2000)

== See also ==
- Southern literature
- Fellowship of Southern Writers
