= He Meets His Match, The Grisly Ghoul =

- Batman episode
- Episode no.: Season 1 Episode 16
- Directed by: Murray Golden
- Written by: Lorenzo Semple Jr.
- Production code: 8715-Pt. 2
- Original air date: March 3, 1966

Guest appearances
- Donna Loren; Kip King; Greg Benedict; Tim O'Kelly; Cherie Foster; Linda Harrison; Sydney Smith; Glenn Allan; Donna Di Martino; Dick Bellis, Joan Parker; Breeland Rice; Jim Henaghan; Special Guest Villain: Cesar Romero as The Joker

Episode chronology
← Previous "The Joker Goes to School"	Next → "True or False-Face"

"He Meets His Match, The Grisly Ghoul" is the 16th episode of the Batman television series, first airing on ABC March 3, 1966 and repeated on August 11 in its first season. It guest starred Cesar Romero as the Joker.

== Plot synopsis ==
Picking up from the last episode, Gotham City suffers a massive power outage just as the slot machine spins the third lemon. The Joker and his henchmen beat a harried retreat, just as the cops arrive in time to cut Batman and Robin out from the electric chairs before the power comes back on. After replaying the audiotape Batman secretly made while in the van, they were able to make out Susie as one of the members of the Joker's crime family, much to Robin's shock and dismay as he had romantic feelings for her. So Robin, in the guise of his true identity, Dick Grayson, an undercover agent, tries to trick Susie into leading him into the "Bad Pennies" and Joker himself. His henchman Nick catches on immediately and sends Dick on his way, but not before tipping him off on an impending robbery at a local bar.

Batman and Robin enter the bar, trigger the gimmicked jukebox which reveals a double-barrel shotgun, deflect its bullets with a Batshield, and use a bomb to destroy the armed machine. They then realize that Susie is in danger and rush to her aid, just as Joker, realizing that Batman is on to Susie, gives her some "imported" Canadian perfume (called Une Nuit Sans Fin (One Endless Night)), which he instructs her to use only after she has planted answers to some important nationwide pre-college exam papers she stole inside one of the rigged machines, not telling her that the perfume has been poisoned.

In the gym, Batman and Robin confront Susie and warn her of impending danger, but she refuses to listen and slumps unconscious when she applies the perfume. It is later revealed that Batman and Robin saved her life by using the "Universal Antidote" pills in their utility belts, and she repaid them by revealing the whole criminal scheme. Meanwhile, Joker, Nick, and Two-Bits arrive at the school in time to snap an incriminating picture of the Woodrow Roosevelt High School basketball team clutching the exam papers complete with written-in answers, which the team received from a rigged milk machine. Joker then reaches a new low in crime: he plans to use the picture to disqualify and suspend the otherwise innocent team members for cheating, and stop them from playing Disko Tech in the night's big game, for he bet his cash on the opposite team and with the home players out of the game, the opposing team, Disko Tech would win from default. The Joker's exact wager was $50,000 on Disko Tech, with the odds set at 20 to 1 on Woodrow Roosevelt High, so this would bring him $1 million.

Batman and Robin suddenly announce themselves from the rafters to inform the students that the exam papers were counterfeit which they planted, rendering the Joker's photo evidence useless. Batman and Robin then attack, putting the Joker and his henchmen out of circulation. Susie, meanwhile, is sent to the Wayne Foundation Institute for Delinquent Girls.

== Notes ==
- The exact same electric chairs to which Batman and Robin are strapped inside the moving van are used again in a season-2 episode #9707-Pt. 2, "Ma Parker". The truck is reused in the season-2 debut, episode #9705-Pt. 1, "Shoot a Crooked Arrow".
- The Joker's Las Vegas bookie is named Pete The Swede, an obvious lampoon of Jimmy The Greek.
- Kip King later provided the cartoon voices of Shecky on Hanna-Barbera's 1983-84 CBS Saturday morning series called The Biskitts.
- Not for the first time, one wonders exactly where Batman keeps his Batshield. It folds into quarters, which still leaves with a piece of flat plastic about a foot square. Conveniently Adam West vaguely tucks it back behind his back and then the camera cuts away.
- When Dick Grayson goes undercover to gain information on The Joker, inside the candy shop that doubles as The Joker's lair, there is a West Virginia University banner seen on the wall.
- When conversing loudly in the bistro, Batman and Robin provide several clues as to Robin's true identity, to which the nearby diners somehow remain completely oblivious.
- In 1981, Brazilian friends Antônio Camano and Fernando Pettinati decided to redub this episode with indecent and profane lines. The video, nicknamed "Bátima: Feira da Fruta" ("Batman: Fruit Fair"), after the song that plays in the video's background, became one of the most popular Internet memes for Brazilian audiences since it was released online in 2003. "Feira da Fruta" even earned a webcomic adaptation in 2012, and a 2014 book where the friends recalled how the dub came to be.

Preceded by The Joker Goes to School (airdate March 2, 1966)	Batman (TV series) episodes March 3, 1966	Succeeded by True or False-Face (airdate March 9, 1966)
