= The Joker Goes to School =

- Batman episode
- Episode no.: Season 1 Episode 15
- Directed by: Murray Golden
- Written by: Lorenzo Semple Jr.
- Production code: 8715-Pt. 1
- Original air date: March 2, 1966

Guest appearances
- Donna Loren; Kip King; Greg Benedict; Bryan O'Byrne; Tim O'Kelly; Cherie Foster; Linda Harrison; Sydney Smith; Glenn Allan; Donna Di Martino; Dick Bellis; Joan Parker; Breeland Rice; Jim Henaghan; Special Guest Villain: Cesar Romero as The Joker

Episode chronology
← Previous "Batman Stands Pat"	Next → "He Meets His Match, The Grisly Ghoul"

"The Joker Goes to School", a first-season episode of the Batman television series, first aired on ABC March 2, 1966 as its 15th episode, with an encore telecast later occurring on August 10. It guest starred Cesar Romero as The Joker.

Lorenzo Semple Jr. gives a subtle backstory for the Joker: when Batman shows the Joker's mugshot to the kids, the Joker is wearing a normal suit, and there is a reference to him being a "master of disguise", leading one to believe this version wears clown makeup (not unlike Heath Ledger's version in The Dark Knight), instead of having his skin discolored by chemicals (as was the original comics character and the Jack Nicholson version in Tim Burton's 1989 film).

In November 1965, Semple concocted a new villain named The One-Armed Bandit, "whose peculiar kick is gimmicked coin machines of all sorts". The idea ultimately wound up in these episodes with Joker in charge of The One Armed Bandit Novelty Company and vending machines that churned out silver dollars, quarters, answer sheets to exams, and knockout gas.

The Joker originally was scheduled to be the first villain to appear, but a scheduling conflict prevented Cesar Romero from appearing on the debut episode.

== Plot synopsis ==
The Joker, attempts to undermine student morale at Woodrow Roosevelt High School in order to recruit high school dropouts for his gang of "Bad Pennies" by rigging the school vending machines to give out silver dollars and negotiable stocks and bonds instead of milk. Alerted by Commissioner James Gordon, Batman races out to the school; an immediate assembly is made by the school's student leaders, including Richard "Dick" Grayson, Pete, and Susie, the school's head cheerleader.

Batman shows up to show slides of mug shots of the Joker, when suddenly, out of the blue, he pops up right in full view of everyone. Batman attempts to arrest him for loitering on school grounds, but the Joker manages to get off on a mere technicality. Meanwhile, across Gotham City, a bar is held up by a gimmicked jukebox which when activated spouts a double-barrel shotgun; then two stocking-masked hoodlums, actually two of Joker's henchmen, Nick and Two-Bits (both high school dropouts), rush in to rob the bar's receipts from the register.

The Joker reconvenes with Nick and Two-Bits at their hideout, the "One-Armed Bandit Novelty Company"; unbeknownst to everyone else, Susie is also the Joker's henchwoman. She arranges to swipe some important exam papers so The Joker can use them in a blackmail scheme, and also leads Batman and Robin into a trap set by the Joker. He and his henchmen snag Batman and Robin with one of the rigged vending machines which, instead of giving out silver dollars, locks them in shackles and emits sleeping gas.

Batman and Robin are transferred to the inside of a moving van, where they are strapped to electric chairs. On the wall is a fruit machine. If they get three Liberty Bells in three slots when it activates, they will win their freedom and $50,000 cash. If they get three oranges, they will win just their freedom, but a lethal and instant 50,000 volts of electricity. If they get three lemons, they will get the electric shock on the last lemon. The first two slots have already ended up being lemons.

== Notes ==
- According to the Joker's police photo, his height is just over 6 ft 6 in (1.98 m). In reality, actor Cesar Romero was 6 ft 2 in (1.88 m).
- This episode is the origin of the names of "Harmless Junk, Inc." and "Citywide Hoop Champs, Inc.", respectively the companies under which The Brothers Chaps produce Homestar Runner and Two More Eggs. It is also the origin of the "No Loafing" sign that can be seen in various Homestar Runner shorts, as well as the inspiration for Strong Bad's costume in "Halloween Fairstival", the Halloween special of 2004.
- "Nick", one of The Joker's henchmen, is played by Kip King (Jerome Kattan), the father of Saturday Night Live star Chris Kattan.

Preceded by Batman Stands Pat (airdate February 24, 1966)	Batman (TV series) episodes March 2, 1966	Succeeded by He Meets His Match, The Grisly Ghoul (airdate March 3, 1966)
