= Linda Harrison =

American actress (born 1945)

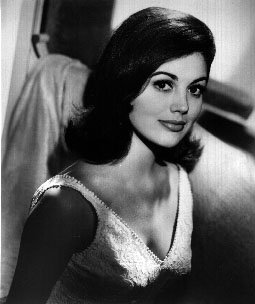
- Harrison ca. 1966
- Born: Linda Melson Harrison; July 26, 1945 (age 81); Berlin, Maryland, U.S.
- Other name: Augusta Summerland
- Education: Stephen Decatur High School
- Occupation: Actress
- Years active: 1966–present
- Notable work: Nova (Planet of the Apes); Beneath the Planet of the Apes; Batman
- Spouse: Richard D. Zanuck (m. 1969; div. 1978)
- Children: 2; including Dean Zanuck

Linda Melson Harrison (born July 26, 1945) is an American television and film actress. She played Nova in the science fiction film classic Planet of the Apes (1968) and the first sequel, Beneath the Planet of the Apes; she also had a cameo in Tim Burton's 2001 remake of the original. She was a regular cast member of the 1969–70 NBC television series Bracken's World. She was the second wife of film producer Richard D. Zanuck (Jaws, Cocoon, Driving Miss Daisy, Charlie and the Chocolate Factory); her youngest son is producer Dean Zanuck (Road to Perdition, Charlie and the Chocolate Factory).

== Early life ==
Linda Melson Harrison was born in Berlin, Maryland. She was the third of five daughters of Isaac Burbage Harrison, a nurseryman, and his wife, Ida Virginia Melson, a beautician. She was the middle child, with two older sisters, Kay and Gloria, and two younger sisters, Jane and Joan. The Harrisons, like Linda's maternal Melson ancestors, had a long history in the Delmarva region. According to Ancestry.com, the Melson family were mid-17th century immigrants to Maryland from Melsonby St James in North Yorkshire. The Anglo-Welsh Harrisons had been resident for generations in West Kirby, Cheshire, when one Richard Harrison, son of another Richard Harrison, emigrated in the early 17th century from West Kirby to the New Haven Colony in what is now Connecticut, thence to Maryland. Richard's descendant, Harrison's paternal grandfather, Joseph G. Harrison, and Joseph's older brother, Orlando Harrison (Mayor of Berlin 1900–1910 and 1916–1918 and Maryland State Senator for Worcester County, 1916-1928), established J.G. Harrison & Sons Nurseries, which were, at one time, the largest fruit tree nursery business in America, employing some five hundred workers. The former Harrison Laboratory at the University of Maryland, College Park campus, which Harrison attended briefly, was named for her paternal great-uncle, Senator Orlando Harrison.

"I knew she'd be a star when she was only five," Ida Harrison told an interviewer in 1969. Mrs Harrison, who described her middle daughter as "a little ham", enrolled her in ballet and acrobatics classes at age five. By age six, Harrison was performing on stage, and liking it. She attended Berlin's Buckingham Elementary School, which her mother and all her sisters attended. In 1956, when she was eleven, Harrison's acrobatic performance earned her first prize in the Delmarva Chicken Festival Talent Contest. Six years later, at the same festival, Harrison won the "Miss Delmarva" beauty contest. By the time she entered Berlin's Stephen Decatur High School, Harrison had become a skilled acrobatic dancer. Harrison also dreamed of becoming an actress and a star.

It was Harrison's plan to become an actress by entering and winning beauty contests, then travel to California to be seen and noticed. When she was in her teens, Harrison worked summers as a waitress at Phillips Crab House in Ocean City, Maryland; she was dating the son of the restaurant's owners when she flew to California for the Miss America beauty contest. From time to time, she appeared as a narrator on local TV programs carried on Baltimore TV station WMAR. Harrison essayed her first dramatic role while attending Stephen Decatur High School, that of "Connie Fuller" in the senior class production of the 1940 Kaufman/Hart play George Washington Slept Here. On Saturday, May 19, 1962, William Hockersmith crowned her Miss Berlin at the Miss Berlin Beauty Pageant, which was held at the high school. A month later, Harrison represented her home town at the Delmarva Chicken Festival beauty contest.

After graduating from high school, Harrison enrolled for a summer term at the University of Maryland, College Park, and a secretarial school in Baltimore, but found it uninspiring. When her oldest sister, Kay, graduated from college and headed for New York, Harrison went with her, with $250 and their mother's credit card. Several years later, Harrison would lament her "admittedly deficient formal education" to an interviewer, saying that she "missed a great deal because I didn't finish school."

== Career ==
=== Breaking into the industry ===
In New York, Kay and Linda shared an apartment and their mother Ida's credit card. Harrison scored some success as a model, but she disliked New York and was homesick for Maryland. Less than a year later, she returned home; following her plan to become an actress by winning beauty contests, she entered the 1964 Miss Delmarva beauty pageant as Miss Berlin, and won. Harrison followed her 1964 victory by entering the Miss Maryland beauty pageant, a preliminary event to the Miss America pageant, itself the final preliminary event to the Miss International contest, which would be held in Long Beach, California, in mid-June 1965. Harrison won the contest over nineteen other girls; that June, as Miss Maryland, she flew to California for the Miss America contest. She thought the trip would last for two weeks. Bidding farewell to her boyfriend, she scheduled her return home in two weeks, after she was crowned Miss America. But she was first-runner up, not the winner. Harrison was "devastated", and so deeply disappointed over losing that she wept backstage.

Her striking good looks and hourglass figure, however, had gained the notice of Mike Medavoy, then an agent at the General Artist Corporation. "You ought to be in pictures," Medavoy told her. In August 1965, Medavoy obtained a "personality test" for her at 20th Century Fox. No acting was involved; Harrison answered questions directed to her from off-camera, while speaking into the camera on various subjects. The test earned her Fox's standard 60-day option agreement, scheduled to expire in November 1965. During her 60-day option period, Harrison studied with Fox acting coach, Pamela Danova.

In October 1965, prior to the expiration of her option, Fox assigned Harrison as the date of studio attorney Harry E. Sokolov for the premiere of The Agony and the Ecstasy. She was selected as Sokolov's date because "Harry was from Baltimore." Harrison was excited, because it was her first premiere, and because the film co-starred Charlton Heston, who had been her idol since she had seen Ben-Hur. At the post-premiere party, which she attended with her studio-assigned date, Harrison was thrilled to meet her longtime idol, Heston, with whom she would soon co-star in Planet of the Apes. At the premiere, Harrison met Sokolov's boss, Fox's Vice President in Charge of Production Richard D. Zanuck. Zanuck, Harrison said later, was immediately "smitten" and fell "madly in love" with her, and she with him, and they began to date. Harrison's acting career, as well as her life, became inextricably intertwined with their subsequent relationship.

=== Early roles ===
Right after meeting Zanuck, Harrison signed Fox's standard seven-year contract in November and was placed in the studio's Talent Training School. Although Harrison told interviewers that Zanuck had created the school so "he could keep an eye on me", the school was actually a former Fox institution which Zanuck had revived to train aspiring, talented young actors and actresses under contract to Fox; besides Harrison, the student roster included Jacqueline Bisset, James Brolin, Tom Selleck and Edy Williams. Under coaches Pamela Danova and Curt Conway, Harrison attended drama classes, speech classes, fencing classes, dance and body movement classes, and lectures by veteran actors, actresses, directors, writers, publicity agents, and teachers. In addition to her strenuous round of classes, Harrison worked with a speech coach to eradicate her Eastern Maryland accent.

Harrison's first assignment under her new Fox contract was as a "Biker Chick" in Men Against Evil, a TV pilot which became the TV series Felony Squad. "I had three words, "Go, man, go!" I was all of 20, and dressed in this really racy motorcycle outfit. Those were my first words! This was still the era of stardom and premieres. When you were put under a studio contract, every minute of your life was so exciting, because you were doing something so unique and special." (Three years later, Harrison co-starred as Felony Squad star Dennis Cole's love interest in the NBC TV series Bracken's World.) Harrison's next assignment was in the Batman TV series, where she appeared briefly as one of three high school cheerleaders in the episodes "The Joker Goes to School" and "He Meets His Match, The Grisly Ghoul", aired in early March 1966. To prepare Harrison for her few seconds onscreen, her Fox dance coach worked Harrison and her fellow cheerleaders early in the morning and on through the day. Linda, a former high school cheerleader, complained, "You're going to use up all my energy, so when the shot comes, I won't have any." Her coach complained that "Linda Harrison gave me a hard time." After the brief late afternoon shot, Harrison's overworked leg muscles failed on her way home, and Zanuck had to carry her upstairs to their Wilshire-Westwood apartment.

All during this period, Dick was telling me about this fabulous book called Planet of the Apes and that it was going to make a great movie. He said, "I want you to play the ape, Dr. Zira."

On March 8, 1966, immediately after her brief appearance on Batman, Harrison was filmed in ape makeup for a proposed film version of Pierre Boulle's satirical novel, Monkey Planet, later released as Planet of the Apes. Zanuck had financed the test in order to show Fox's money men that, despite all doubts to the contrary, the Planet of the Apes project was feasible. The test, written by Rod Serling and directed by Franklin J. Schaffner, starred Harrison's idol, Charlton Heston, and Edward G. Robinson as Heston's nemesis, Dr. Zaius. Harrison appeared as Zira, the role ultimately played by Kim Hunter, while Harrison's Talent School classmate fellow contract actor, James Brolin, took on Roddy McDowall's role of Cornelius.

I think they always had me in mind for Nova. But they needed someone to do the screen test, and you keep trying to employ your actors. So. I did the screen test. The part that was hard for me was actually doing the mask, where they put all that plaster on your face and you have to lie there still for a long time. Fortunately, I was an acrobat growing up, and a very very good one — I won a lot of contests — so I knew how to control my body and be 'quiet'. You had to do that, you had to be very still and lay there and be a 'good patient'. A young actor will do anything to get their mug on the screen! I remember that the makeup process took about three hours. I had to lay back and be perfectly still as they put this plaster mold on my face. After seeing the test, everyone was very enthusiastic about going ahead with making Planet of the Apes. But they felt the makeup needed a little more work and perfecting before it would look good on screen.

Though the ape make-up test was considered successful, the studio rejected the project again. Meanwhile, in May 1966, Harrison made her big screen debut as one of several "Treasure Hunters" in The Fat Spy. The low-budget comedy might have been forgotten had it not been mentioned in a 2004 documentary as one of The 50 Worst Movies Ever Made. Harrison's next big screen outing was in the Jerry Lewis comedy Way...Way Out; she played half of a husband-wife astronaut team on the verge of divorce. She appeared early in the film, arguing furiously, in her still-uneradicated Down Eastern accent, with her onscreen husband and off-screen Talent School classmate, James Brolin, with whom she had appeared in the Planet of the Apes makeup test.

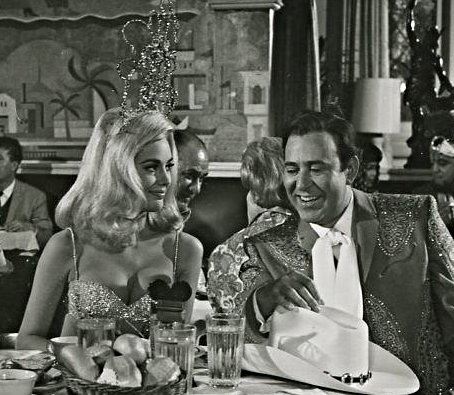
With Carl Reiner, A Guide for the Married Man

After Way...Way Out, Harrison appeared in a four-minute test segment entitled "Who's Afraid of Diana Prince?", created by Batman producer William Dozier, which was supposed to engender interest in a Wonder Woman pilot and an eventual TV series. Harrison played a glamorous mirror image of Wonder Woman, which existed only in the imagination of the homely Diana Prince character, played by Ellie Wood Walker (Robert Walker Jr.'s wife). The "Who's Afraid of Diana Prince?" segment failed to engender any interest in a Wonder Woman pilot, although Lynda Carter had great success in the role eight years later. Harrison next appeared as Carl Reiner's blonde-wigged young inamorata "Miss Stardust" in A Guide for the Married Man (1967), a bedroom comedy about marital infidelity directed by Gene Kelly and starring Walter Matthau, Robert Morse and Inger Stevens. Harrison described her vignette with Carl Reiner as "fun" because it took her "all over the world. I was in limousines and on a donkey and on a camel." In addition to speaking one line of dialogue, she wore several costumes for her five-minute globe-trotting adventure, including an elaborate sequinned bikini, a diaphanous negligee, and a fiery red sarong.

=== Planet of the Apes ===
Producer Arthur P. Jacobs had first thought of former Bond girl Ursula Andress for Nova, and extensive auditions were held for the role, with one of the women tested being Angelique Pettyjohn, who had played a warrior in the Star Trek episode "The Gamesters of Triskelion". Filming was to commence in May 1967, but as late as April 17 Charlton Heston noted in his diary, "The casting problem's really Nova: who will do it, and how naked can she be. The tests I saw were not good." Zanuck eventually asked Jacobs and Mort Abrahams if they would test Harrison. "[Dick] did it very nicely," Abrahams said.

"He said, 'I'd like you to consider Linda.' Linda was in the acting school that was on the lot at that point and about four or five times a year the students did little scenes live on a soundstage and the producers and directors on the lot were invited to attend. So I'd seen her act and I said to Dick, 'We will be glad to meet with Linda,' and [director] Frank[lin Schaffner] and I would chat with her and talk about the part but that she would be treated like an actress, not as an affiliation with anybody else. And he said, 'That's the way it has to be.' And we did and we thought she was fine."

In the 1998 AMC documentary Behind the Planet of the Apes, Harrison said of her role as Nova, "I thought about animal instincts, the way [Nova] would move and the way she would react would be more the way an animal would react, more from fear. It seemed to be what the director wanted." After her test, Harrison was hired to play the role for which she would later be known. Harrison, Mort Abrahams said, was

"delighted to get it, because she'd only done little tiny bit parts in a couple of pictures before that. I was pleasantly surprised by her. She called me one day and asked if she could bring her sister along with her onto location. I said, 'Sure, of course, no problem.' And I was delighted because she was going out with the head of the studio. She could have been the biggest pain in the ass alive. And I would be in a terribly awkward position if she started with the limousines and the special means and whatever the hell it is—or complaining about whatever. But never a peep out of her. Most pleasant, most charming, very cooperative, very hard-working. She was always there half an hour before her call and she always stayed on for a half hour just in case. Interested in everything that went on, and was a total joy. I couldn't ask for a more cooperative actor."

Planet of the Apes commenced filming on May 21, 1967 and ended August 10, 1967. The first scenes were shot on locations near Page, Arizona. Horseshoe Bend on the Colorado River stood in for the Forbidden Zone, through which Taylor, Zira, Cornelius, and Harrison's Nova fled after escaping from Ape City. Harrison, who had the company of her oldest sister Kay on location with her, found working in the desert "beautiful", and marveled "how they move an entire production, like a little mini-town, and set up."

"I don't know if people viewed me differently because I was Richard Zanuck's girlfriend. I was so delighted and grateful to be in this picture that I probably never saw the negative side as much. I just didn't. I remember one piece of advice Dick gave me: He said, 'You go to work on time and listen to your director and do your job. And I don't want to hear any complaints about you!' I had to be even more careful and nice because I was his girlfriend."

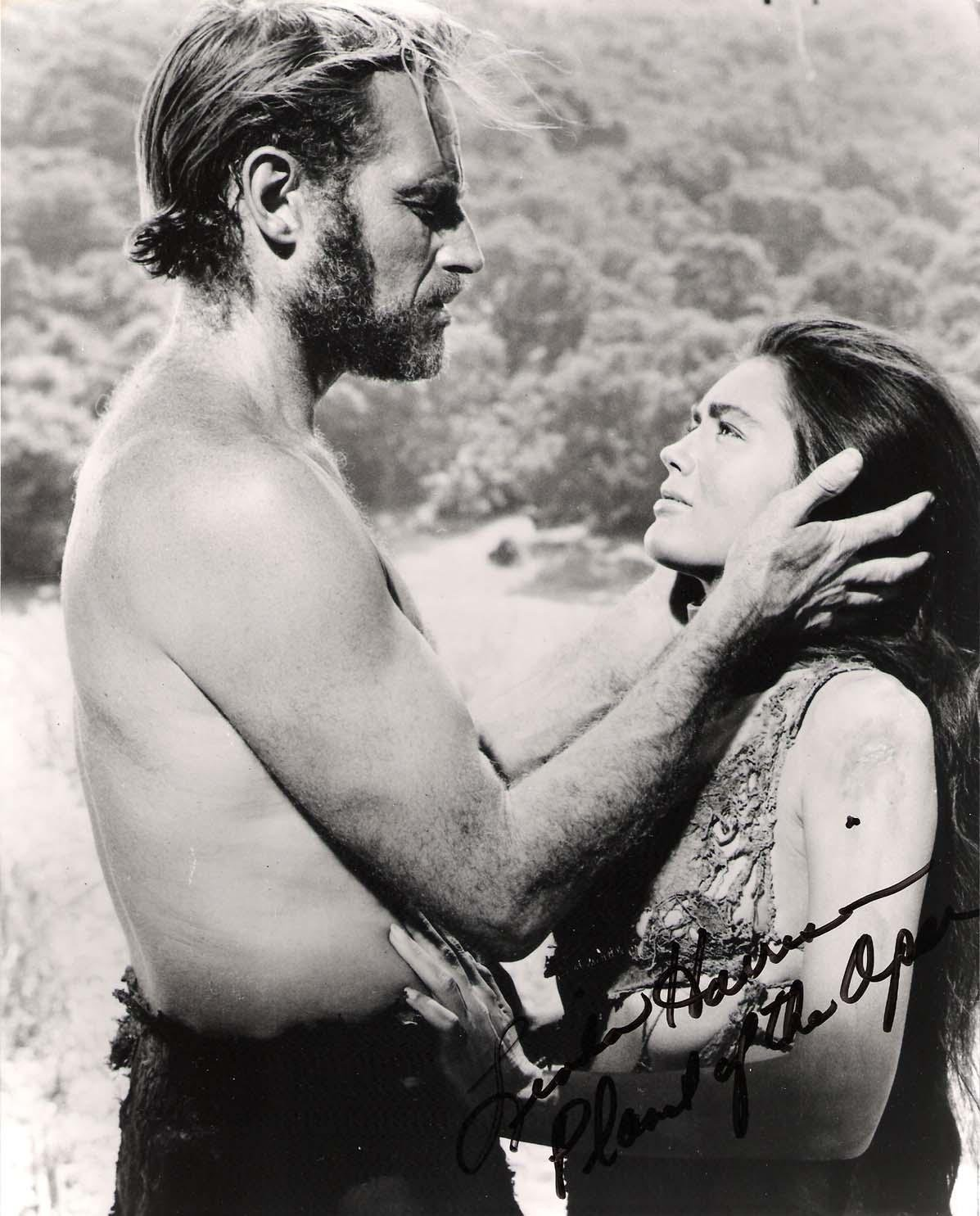
Heston and Harrison in Planet of the Apes

Heston noted in his diary on June 16, 1967 that "Linda H. has problems, but Frank's keeping her nearly immobile in her scenes, which works." Harrison noted that as Heston knew it was her "first big picture", he took it upon himself to coach her. Harrison was admittedly still "camera-shy", so Heston "taught me to favour the camera. Don't look right into it. Look off to the side, don't look too far, you know, not to turn my head this way. And he would say turn it just here. Don't go all the way back. And he held my hand for a lot of things." Their off-screen relationship, Harrison said, tended to reflect their on-screen relationship.

"Heston had a quiet quality about him and was very courteous with me. He encouraged me to favor the camera. I was a newcomer in many ways – which may have helped my character. I'm sure Heston had his doubts about me; however, he never showed them. He treated me more like a child than an adult and not much was discussed between us, in character or out. When you idolize someone like I did, you tend to submit rather than assert yourself. Again, this worked in our roles and the relationship between us, as Taylor and Nova. Heston was terrific to work with and so helpful and such a gentleman."

As the "rookie" on the set, Harrison credited the help she received from the veteran actors: "Everybody that was involved in it, they all realized I was a neophyte, I was like 21 years old so they kind of took me under their wing, since I hadn't done acting that much."

Kim Hunter recalled working with Harrison on the Planet of the Apes set:

"She was a lovely girl and so pretty, such a lovely figure and consumed with the work. I also remember her in relation to the Valium I used to take to relax because of the makeup. She asked what my strength was. It was five milligrams, or whatever, and she said, 'Oh, my God, that little? I never go to sleep without ten at least.' I do remember that conversation."

At one point, it was decided that Nova was pregnant, and scenes were filmed around the Page locations revealing Nova's pregnancy. In the penultimate drafts of Planet of the Apes, Taylor was killed by the bullet of an ape sniper while Nova, pregnant with Taylor's child, escaped and vanished into the Forbidden Zone. Although Harrison believed it was Heston who rejected the idea of Nova's pregnancy, those scenes were deleted, according to screenwriter Michael Wilson, "at the insistence of a high-echelon Fox executive who found it distasteful. Why? I suppose that, if one defines the mute Nova as merely "humanoid" and not actually human, it would mean that Taylor had committed sodomy." It was also decided that Nova's pregnancy would detract from the film's ending. In any case, all Harrison's scenes with Heston and Hunter in the sequence of Nova's pregnancy were cut. "There's probably a great deal of footage of it somewhere."

After filming in the desert concluded, production moved to Malibu Creek State Park, northwest of Los Angeles, on Las Virgenes Road off Mulholland Highway, where the 20th Century Fox's Malibu Ranch was located. Ape City was built on the ranch, and a field of corn grown, by which Heston first encounters Harrison. "It was stinking hot," Harrison recalled. "The scenes of us in cages were also shot at Ape City." From the Malibu Ranch, production moved to the coast, where the penultimate scenes were shot between Malibu and Oxnard. The final scenes were filmed in a secluded cove between Zuma Beach and Point Dume on the far eastern end of Westward Beach. Harrison's Nova was the sole human witness to Taylor's outburst on the beach, after which she looks up and, in the film's iconic ending, sees the ruined Statue of Liberty, without comprehending why it has caused her mate's grief.

Harrison's favourite scenes were shot at the coast. She "thought that was kind of neat. And then jumping on his horse and riding with him and he turned around and I smiled. And we were going off to wherever – was out there. And that would have been a great way to start – well, they sort of started the next one that way."

In later years, Harrison said she was conscious of the film's socio-political undertones:

"We were the flower children. We were the baby boomers. We were at war. We were changing and making transitions. What was seeping through people's consciousness in that era was a fear of Russia and a fear of the bomb... It revealed what a lot of us were feeling but couldn't talk about, and that was the race issue."

Planet of the Apes premiered in February 1968. The film was a hit upon its release, as well as a critical and commercial success. In the opening credits, Harrison was billed under the tag "introducing Linda Harrison"; although she had appeared in three previous films. Zanuck wanted to draw attention to Harrison because he felt the role would catapult her to stardom. Harrison impressed audiences with her hourglass figure, long dark hair, and large brown eyes, which, in the absence of spoken dialogue, did most of her acting, though some critics were unimpressed. Renata Adler of the New York Times dismissed Harrison as “Heston's Neanderthal flower girl. She wiggles her hips when she wants to say something." The success of Planet of the Apes spawned four sequels, an animated cartoon series, a live-action TV series, a remake by Tim Burton, and a reboot that spawned four films. Heston and Harrison appeared in the first sequel, Beneath the Planet of the Apes. Three decades later, Harrison had a brief cameo in the 2001 reboot, which also featured Heston.

On August 27, 1998, the Academy of Motion Picture Arts and Sciences presented a 30th anniversary screening of Planet of the Apes. Harrison attended, along with Heston, Kim Hunter, Roddy McDowall and John Chambers. The film was also an inductee of the 2001 National Film Registry list.

=== Beneath the Planet of the Apes ===
Linda Harrison's second outing in her most famous role was in the first sequel to Planet of the Apes. She admitted "it wasn't as good as the first", saying that the original "had a top director and cinematographer. You couldn't beat Franklin J. Schaffner. In the second film we made it for less."

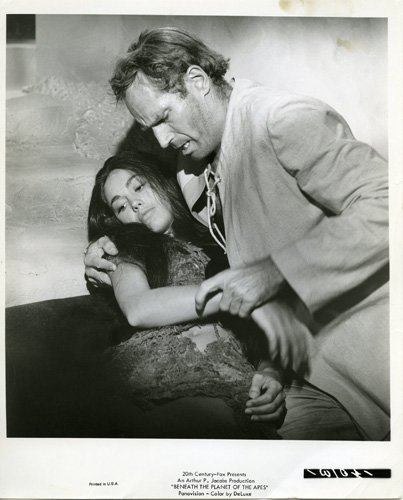
Taylor (Charlton Heston) cradles the dying Nova (Harrison) in Beneath the Planet of the Apes

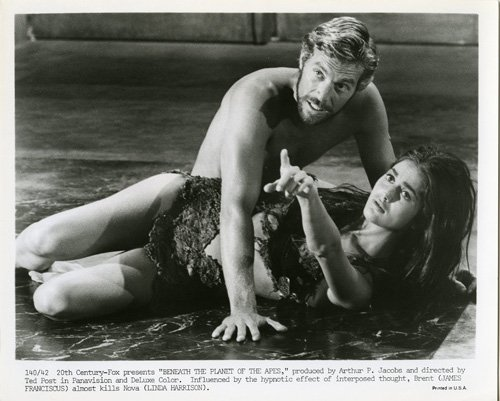
Harrison with James Franciscus in Beneath the Planet of the Apes, 1970

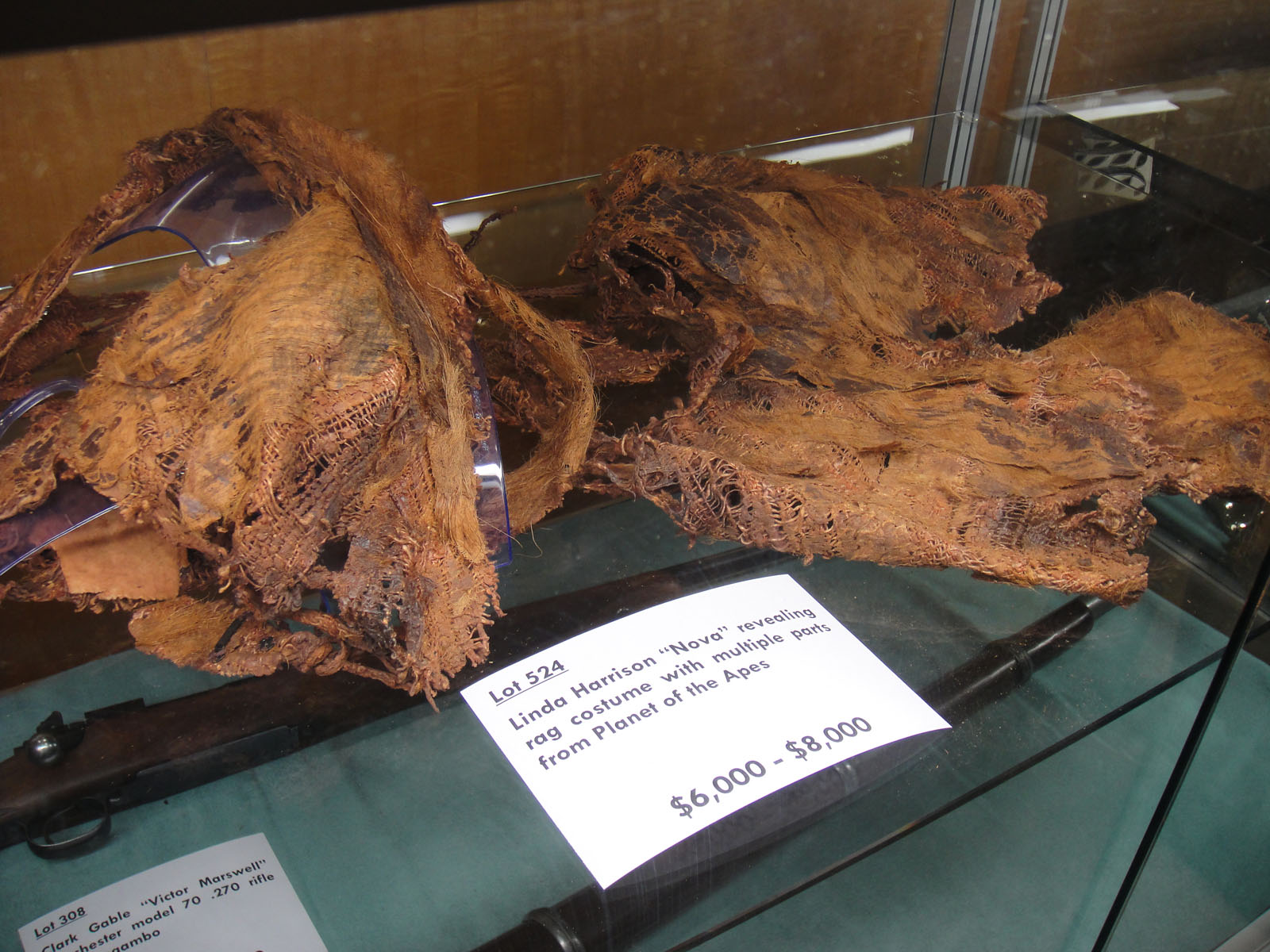
Harrison's "Nova" costume in the first two "Apes" films – Debbie Reynolds Auction, June 2011

No sequels had been contemplated at the time of the production of Planet of the Apes; it was only during that film's success that a sequel was discussed. Neither Charlton Heston nor Kim Hunter wanted to do another Apes film; Roddy McDowall pleaded another commitment; and Harrison herself was ambivalent. She was engaged to her mentor, Richard Zanuck and "no longer totally concerned with being an actress. I don't even want to do another picture. But since this is a sequel to the one I did last year, I felt obligated. "Ted Post was a wonderful television director," Harrison said, "fabulous to work with, an actor's dream. I could get away with murder with him."

Although her role as Nova was expanded, the sequel was a disappointing rush to production to capitalize on the original. Harrison's character eked out one word before she was shot to death, but nothing fresh was added. The budget was half that of Planet of the Apes. Director Ted Post said, "It moved basically as an entertainment piece, nothing more." Post wanted the script rewritten. "I was very unhappy with the script, and I thought the script was far from what it should have been. The story was unclear, and didn't measure up." On his first reading of the script for Beneath the Planet of the Apes, star James Franciscus phoned Charlton Heston. "Jesus Christ, Chuck," he said, "have you read this piece of crap?"

Post knew Harrison's role was difficult to do anything with.

"Linda was a wonderfully cooperative young lady that needed direction. Had no technique and no real acting experience. She was engaged to marry Dick Zanuck. So in Planet of the Apes they put her in with Frank Schaffner, then in mine, they underwrote her. They had nothing for her to do in this one, except just be part of the sequel. In other words, she was so badly conceived in the writing that I had to conceive actions for her to make her belong to the piece. And the big action which I gave her – and I think she came off beautifully with it – was to try to understand what these people were trying to communicate to her. And struggling to understand and feeling sympathetic vibrations coming from these people. So I gave her something which was not in the script to play and she played that, I think, very simpatico, very beautifully."

Harrison's co-star, James Franciscus, remembered her fondly:

"Linda was a joy to work with. I remember we were doing a tracking shot, a camera car on tracks running about one hundred yards down this field. Linda and I were on this horse with no saddle, no reins, just the mane. If anybody fell, that camera truck is there to roll under. It was a very dodgey scene. You're galloping through gopher holes, etc. And they got the mares down at the far end. The stallion getting ready to go is smelling the mares and he's running like a bat out of hell and Linda's behind me saying, 'I'm very nervous about this horse.' And I said, 'Join the club. Just hang on and if you feel you can't do it, just don't do it. It's risky. There's no question about it, it's not a safe shot. What a horse is going to do, no one can tell.' But she was courageous, foolhardy or not, maybe me, too. She went ahead and we did it. I recall afterwards Loren Janes, my stunt man, came up and said, 'You're crazy. I wouldn't have done that. It's too dangerous.' And he's probably right. I thought it was very foolish to have done it. Anyway, Linda was a gutsy little gal and she did it. So she was very pleasant to work with and very nice."

Harrison recalled "having a lot of fun on the second Apes film":

"It was Ted Post and it was more relaxed. I remember running down this hill and getting up so much speed that one of these fabulous makeup men – big guy, burly chest – had to step in and stop me. Otherwise, I would have tumbled, God knows where. It was a very arduous picture, physically, with those horses and everything, but we just got in there and did our jobs."

=== Bracken's World and wrongful termination suits ===
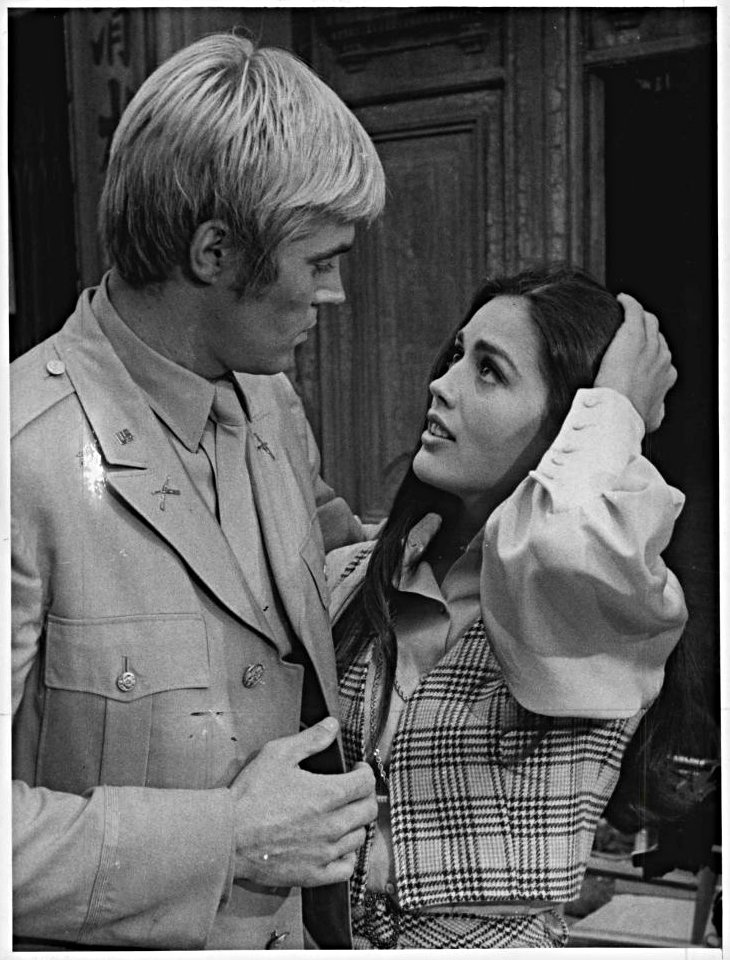
Dennis Cole as Davy Evans and Linda Harrison as Paulette Douglas in Bracken's World, October 1969

While filming Beneath the Planet of the Apes, Harrison was cast as one of a trio of starlets in the Fox-produced NBC TV series Bracken's World. It was, she said, "a series Dick [Zanuck]) for a long time had wanted to do. So I got that part and I had to finish Beneath and go right into the pilot..." She played Paulette Douglas, a naive young woman and aspiring actress, who tried to balance studio pressures with her romance with a studio stuntman (Harrison's Felony Squad co-star Dennis Cole). The series also starred Emmy Award-winning actress Jeanne Cooper as Douglas's pushy mother. Harrison began filming the day after she finished her work on Beneath the Planet of the Apes. "And I had to start remembering lines! Silence may be golden," she told an interviewer in October 1969, "but no one knows how happy I am to be off the gold standard."

Harrison was noted as "one of the most refreshing young faces to light up TV screens this new season." Fox publicists issued press releases glossing over Harrison's deficient education and claiming for her a passion for Shakespeare, Voltaire, and Aristotle which she never possessed. Midway through its second season, Bracken's World was cancelled. Harrison said later that the studio wanted recognizable stars every week, instead of allowing the regular cast to grow as an ensemble, as was the case with shows such as Star Trek. "Had they done it like a continuing drama and focused on the regular characters, it would have lasted longer," she said. "NBC, however, wanted a one-hour contained show, so they would stock each episode with a big guest star. After a while, you run out of story."

After Bracken's World was cancelled, Harrison was caught in the 20th Century Fox proxy shareholder war that began in December 1970. Harrison's husband, Richard Zanuck, was one of the majority shareholders of the company with his father, studio head Darryl Zanuck, and his mother, actress Virginia Fox, then the estranged wife of Darryl. The proxy battle pitched Harrison's husband and mother-in-law against her father-in-law, after the studio had posted losses in consecutive years. In the course of the struggle, then-studio chief Darryl fired his son. Harrison's contract was abruptly terminated in November 1970. The reason given was that her presence might prove "embarrassing" to the studio. Harrison, who was by then pregnant with her first son, later sued for wrongful termination, breach of contract, alleged defamation, and infliction of emotional distress. Harrison was named in the $22 million lawsuit her husband filed November 1, 1971, against Darryl, Fox, the studio chairman and CEO Dennis C. Stanfill, and Fox Executive Committee chairman William T. Gossett. In his suit Zanuck contended that he, Harrison, and former Fox executive David Brown had been wrongly terminated and subjected to humiliation and embarrassment. The suit was settled out of court. The terms and amounts of Harrison's settlements were never disclosed.

=== Films and television: 1974–1988 ===
In 1974, after a sabbatical of several years, Harrison attempted to return to her career. She desperately wanted the role of Roy Scheider's wife in Jaws, and urged her husband to give it to her. Zanuck asked director Steven Spielberg if he would consider Harrison, but Spielberg preferred actress Lorraine Gary, whom he had seen in a TV movie, The Marcus Nelson Murders, and cast her instead of Harrison "because she was right for the part." Harrison was upset over Spielberg's preference for Gary, feeling that her husband should have gotten her the part. "I really wanted Dick to go to bat for me this one time." As a consolation, Universal chief Sid Sheinberg, Lorraine Gary's husband, got Harrison a part in Airport 1975 as Gloria Swanson's personal assistant, Winnie. Though the movie starred Harrison's long-time idol, Charlton Heston, Harrison had no scenes with him, and "would have much rather had Jaws on my resume." Years later, in an April 2012 interview, Harrison offered a reason she had lost the role because "They said Roy Scheider couldn't get a girl as beautiful as me."

Despite her disappointment over losing the coveted Jaws role, Harrison was fascinated by Gloria Swanson, and spent hours with her on sets between takes. "She took a special liking to me. She really went on about the sex she had with Joe Kennedy. There wasn't anything she wouldn't say. He was going to marry her, but he couldn't leave Rose and the children, he was a wonderful lover, and she'd detail it." Airport 1975 was the first time Harrison appeared under the name "Augusta Summerland", which her guru had chosen for her.

After Airport 1975, Harrison guest-starred on several TV shows. As "Augusta Summerland", she appeared on Barnaby Jones in episode #67 "The Alpha-Bravo War" (air date: October 24, 1975); on Switch in episode #24 "Death Squad" (air date: April 6, 1976); and again on Barnaby Jones in episode #114 "The Damocles Gun" (air date: October 20, 1977). In the 1980s, Harrison resumed studying acting and enrolled in an acting school. When the school held a showcase presentation of its students' work, Harrison invited her by-then ex-husband and his third wife, Lili Fini Zanuck. The Zanucks needed a middle-aged actress to play Barrett Oliver's mother in their upcoming production of Cocoon; after viewing Harrison's scenes, they told her there might be a part for her. "So I had an interview with Ron Howard and he said 'You got the part.'" Harrison reprised her role as Susan in the 1988 sequel, Cocoon: The Return, which failed to achieve the commercial and critical success of its predecessor.

=== Later work: 1990 to 2015 ===
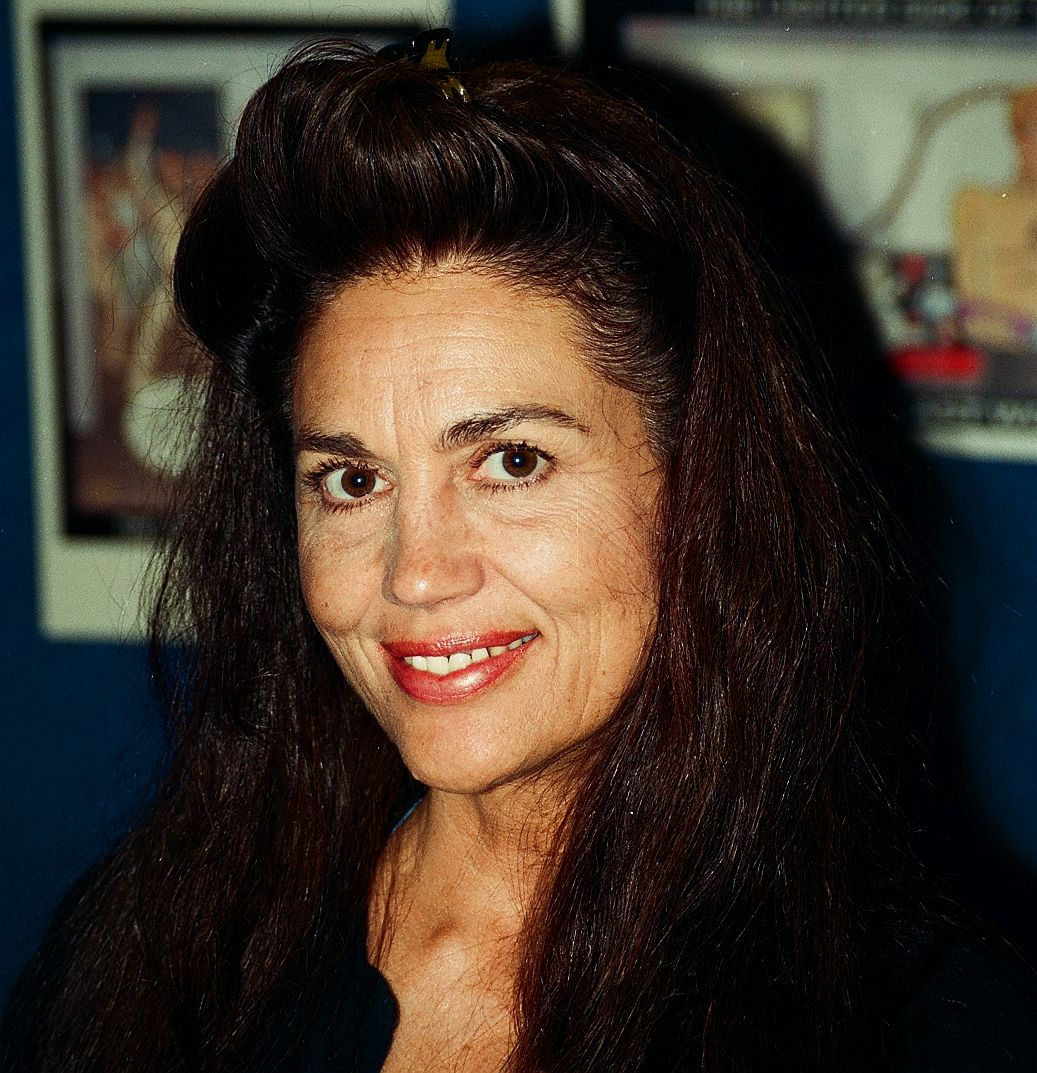
Harrison in 2002

In 1990, Harrison moved back home to Berlin, where she opened a consignment shop which she named "Harrison's Peach Tree" half a mile from the house where she was born and raised. Several years later, wanting to be closer to her sons, she returned to Los Angeles and obtained a real estate license, like her eldest sister, Kay. In 1995, she landed a small part as the "Madam" in Wild Bill. In 1998, she appeared as herself in the Kevin Burns TV documentary Behind the Planet of the Apes about the making of the first five Planet of the Apes films. In October 1998, Harrison attended her first science fiction convention in New Jersey. Also in attendance were Jonathan Harris, Marta Kristen, Mark Goddard and Angela Cartwright, of the original Lost in Space TV series; Lou Ferrigno of The Incredible Hulk TV series; and Bela Lugosi Jr. and Sara Karloff. Harrison found it "rewarding when you really haven't done anything for a number of years and then, all of a sudden, people want your autograph. It was very gratifying." Eventually, Harrison became an institution at Planet of the Apes cons. "I like it. It's very good. You're being appreciated for your work." In 2001, she had a cameo as the "Woman in Cart" in Tim Burton's remake of Planet of the Apes. "They are much more brutal in the new movie," she said. "And strong. They literally hurl the humans 50 or 60 feet." Most of the footage Harrison shot was omitted from the final, so "if you blink you miss me. They showed my shots all over the place, but it got cut out."

In 2013, Harrison began filming Midnight Massacre, on which she served as executive producer and co-star. The post-apocalyptic thriller, set in the near future, is loosely based on Shakespeare's Julius Caesar. The film's final release date was December 15, 2023.

== Awards ==
In 2008, the 40th anniversary of the release of Planet of the Apes, Harrison traveled to Catalonia, Spain, where on October 11, she was awarded the Maria Honorifica at the Festival Internacional de Cinema Fantàstic de Catalunya in recognition of her career.

== Filmography ==
=== Films ===
Year	Film	Director	Role
1966	The Fat Spy	Joseph Cates	Treasure Hunter
1966	Way...Way Out	Gordon Douglas	Peggy
1967	A Guide for the Married Man	Gene Kelly	Miss Stardust
1968	Planet of the Apes	Franklin J. Schaffner	Nova
1970	Beneath the Planet of the Apes	Ted Post	Nova
1974	Airport 1975	Jack Smight	Winnie (credited as "Augusta Summerland")
1985	Cocoon	Ron Howard	Susan
1988	Cocoon: The Return	Daniel Petrie	Susan
1995	Wild Bill	Walter Hill	Madam
2001	Planet of the Apes	Tim Burton	Woman in Cart
2022	Midnight Massacre	Travis Bowen (lead director)	Quinia Brutus

=== Television ===
Year	Show	Episode	Role
1966	Men Against Evil	Pilot	Biker Chick
1966	Batman	The Joker Goes to School	Cheerleader II
1966	Batman	He Meets His Match, The Grisly Ghoul	Cheerleader II
1967	Wonder Woman: Who's Afraid of Diana Prince?	Short	Wonder Woman – Reflection (uncredited)
1969	The Tonight Show Starring Johnny Carson	Wednesday, November 19, 1969	Herself
1969–1970	Bracken's World	41 episodes	Paulette Douglas
1975	Barnaby Jones	"The Alpha Bravo War"	Dori Calder (credited as "Augusta Summerland")
1976	Switch	Death Squad	Jill Martin (credited as "Augusta Summerland")
1977	Barnaby Jones	The Damocles Gun	Jan Redbow (credited as "Augusta Summerland")
1998	Behind the Planet of the Apes	TV documentary	Herself
2014	Inside Edition	Episode #25.221	Herself
