= Bátima: Feira da Fruta =

- Based on: Batman
- Distributed by: YouTube
- Release date: 1981
- Country: Brazil

Feira da Fruta is the title of a parody created via satirical redubbing and also known as "Bátima Feira da Fruta" in which the audio of an episode from the 1960s Batman series ("He Meets His Match, The Grisly Ghoul," from the Season 1, Episode 16) was completely replaced with comical and profane dialogue.

== Origin ==
The redubbing was produced independently in 1981 by the friends Fernando Pettinati and Antônio Camano, and the title refers to the song of the same name by the group Capote, which serves as the "musical background" for the redub.

Originally recorded on VHS, the redub was "rescued" around 2003 when a digital version was released online, garnering over two million views. In 2012, the redub was adapted into a comic book organized by Eduardo Ferigato, featuring contributions from various Brazilian artists such as Mario Cau, Roger Cruz, Julia Bax, and Cris Peter, among others. This comic book version won the 25th HQ Mix award in 2013 in the "Webcomics" category.

== Reception ==
The story of the redubbing was told in the book Entrei na Feira da Fruta, authored by those responsible for the project and released by the publisher Usina das Ideias, featuring a foreword by Danilo Gentili.

Bátima Feira da Fruta is considered the first meme, the first viral hit, and the first comedy hit of the Brazilian internet.

== See Also ==
- Hermes e Renato
