= Myrna Fahey =

American actress (1933–1973)

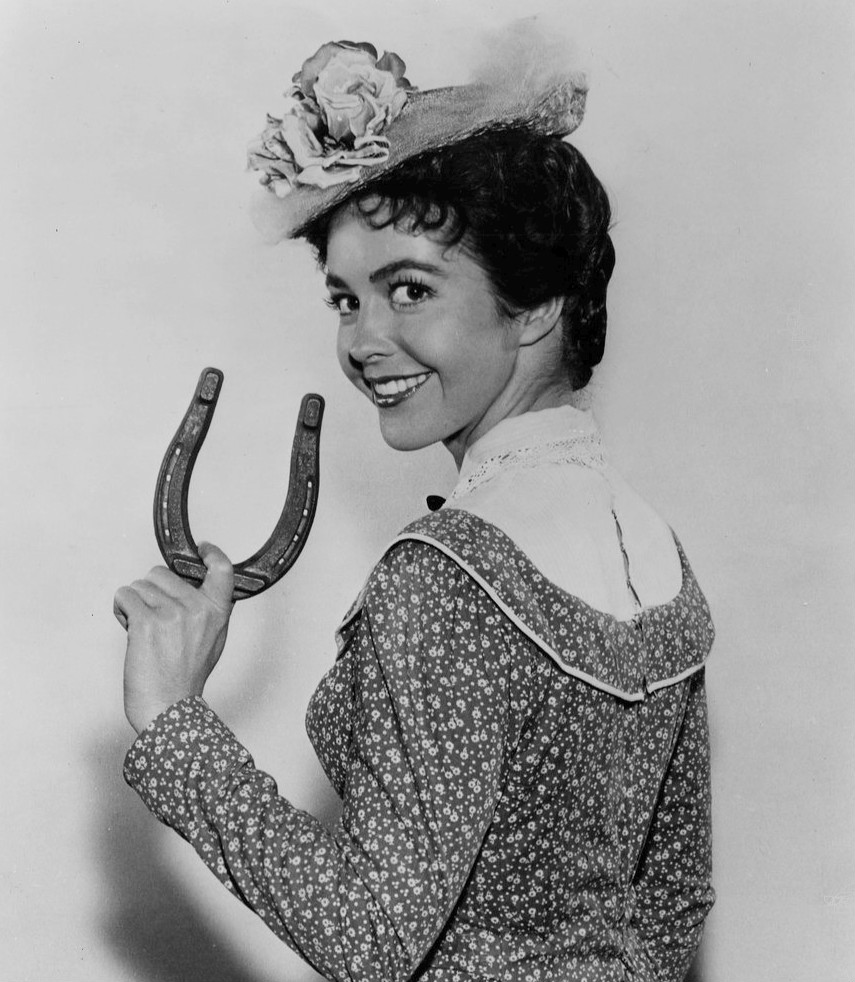
- Fahey in 1959
- Born: March 12, 1933; Carmel, Maine, U.S.
- Died: May 6, 1973 (aged 40); Santa Monica, California, U.S.
- Resting place: Mount Pleasant Catholic Cemetery, Bangor, Maine
- Occupation: Actress
- Years active: 1954–1973
- Known for: House of Usher; Walt Disney's Zorro; Father of the Bride; Batman

Myrna Fahey (March 12, 1933 – May 6, 1973) was an American actress known for her role as Maria Crespo in Walt Disney's Zorro and as Madeline Usher in The Fall of the House of Usher.

She appeared in episodes of 37 television series from the 1950s into the 1970s, including Bonanza, Wagon Train, The Time Tunnel, Maverick, 77 Sunset Strip, Laramie, Gunsmoke, The Adventures of Superman, Kraft Suspense Theatre, Daniel Boone, Perry Mason, and Batman.

== Early years ==
Myrna Elisabeth Fahey was born in Carmel, Maine, near Bangor, the youngest of three children for Francis Edward Fahey and Olivia Newcomb. She attended Carmel Grammar School until age six, along with her older brothers. By early 1940 the family had moved to Southwest Harbor, where her father took a job at the Manset Boat Yard.

As a youngster, Myrna was active in the Girl Scouts, swimming, and acrobatics, and took dancing lessons. Fahey did her secondary education at Pemetic High School in Southwest Harbor, where she performed in musicals, plays, and took part in public speaking events. Despite her short stature, she was athletic, outscoring all other girls in her school to win a state-level Girls Athletic Association award. Fahey took part in her school's wilderness exploring club, was a cheerleader for four years, and captain of the girls' undefeated varsity basketball team.

== Drama school and beauty pageants ==
Fahey graduated from high school in June 1951 and worked briefly at a retail job in Bangor. The following October, she enrolled at the Pasadena Playhouse Unable to find acting work after her drama school stint, Fahey returned to Maine in late spring 1952. Having been chosen Miss Mount Desert Island 1950 and Miss Poultry Queen of Hancock County 1951 while in high school, she decided to enter the Miss Maine pageant. At the state fair in August 1952, representing Bangor, Fahey came in first runner-up to winner Norma Lee Collins. Fahey immediately entered another beauty pageant the following month, winning the Miss Maine Cosmetology 1952 title.

== Start in television ==
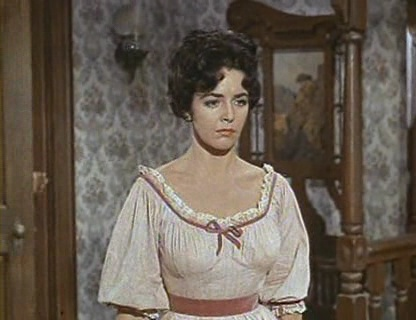
Myrna Fahey in Bonanza

Fahey's placement in the Miss Maine contests brought her to the attention of Hollywood scouts. Encouraged by their overtures, she returned to California and found work at local television station KHJ in Los Angeles. Fahey served as one of the fashion model hostesses on Queen for a Day and did photo shoots and general publicity events for the station's advertisers and other programs. Her first real acting job was for a television anthology series, Cavalcade of America, appearing on episode "Margin for Victory".

Fahey continued doing occasional work on KHJ through 1954. She also did fashion modeling for the Broadway department store. Fahey's first real break came in March 1955, when Warner Brothers gave her a small, uncredited part in what was then called A Handful of Clouds, but was later released as I Died a Thousand Times. She did well enough in her first film that the studio also used her for its premiere television program, Warner Brothers Presents. This show had three rotating series; Myrna Fahey had a feature role in the first episode of King's Row starring Jack Kelly and Robert Horton.

== Interlude ==
However, the Warners job finished during Summer 1955, so Myrna Fahey committed to an extended publicity campaign for the title of Miss Rheingold. This commercial beauty contest lasted from August through October 1955. It featured six "finalists", all aspiring actresses, whom the general public could vote for at various venues around the country. Although she didn't win, Fahey received a lot of national publicity from personal appearances and newspaper photos. Publicity of a different sort came from syndicated columnist Harrison Carroll, who reported in December 1955 that she was at the Cocoanut Grove night club with Frank Sinatra associate Nick Sevano.

In January 1956, Fahey was selected to be a "Baby Star", a short-lived attempt to revive the old WAMPAS annual tradition. It fizzled, and so did Myrna's career for the rest of the year. She had no performing work, and was relegated to doing "hostess" bits for public events.

== Breakthrough ==
With the beginning of 1957 Myrna had a steady stream of film and television work, though her roles in the former were still small and uncredited. She moved from Burbank to a large apartment in Beverly Hills that she shared with her mother, and registered as a Republican.

Matinee Theater, an anthology series that presented a new hour-long movie every afternoon, was Fahey's mainstay for television work at this time. She did many of these live original productions during 1957, though the titles of some are no longer known. Myrna Fahey also did a lot of work for Disney Studios in the fall of 1957 that would not be released or broadcast until the following year. Starting about this time some columnists compared Myrna Fahey's looks with those of Elizabeth Taylor, though Myrna had bright green eyes quite unlike Taylor's distinctive violet.

At the end of 1957, Myrna Fahey had her first professional stage role, with a principal part in the Pasadena Playhouse production of Holiday for Lovers, later made into a 1959 film. Reviewer Franklin Argyle said "Myrna Fahey (Betsy Dean) is a fine actress confined to a lightweight part".

== Film and television work ==
Fahey complained in a 1960 interview that she was being typecast in "good girl" roles because of what directors called her "moral overtones," even though she wanted to play darker and more complicated characters. She had worked in many Westerns in the late 1950s, usually in the role of the sheriff's daughter, including an appearance on Gunsmoke in 1958 (an episode entitled: "Innocent Broad"). Fahey also appeared in a supporting role in "Duel at Sundown", a notable episode of Maverick with James Garner, featuring Clint Eastwood as a trigger-happy villain. In another appearance in ‘‘Maverick’’ she starred as Dee Cooper, the owner of a cattle ranch, in conflict with Maverick's herd of sheep. She starred in two episodes of Wagon Train, "The Jane Hawkins Story" (1960) and "The Melanie Craig Story" (1964), and an episode of Straightaway, "Troubleshooter," in 1961. Fahey's image branched out in the 1960s, helped by House of Usher and a role on the Boris Karloff TV series Thriller that same year titled "Girl with a Secret". Even her Western parts became "darker." After a rough love scene in the 1960 episode of Bonanza "Breed of Violence", in which Fahey cut her lip, the cast presented her with an award for "Best Slapper in a Filmed Series".

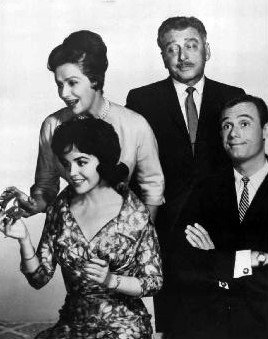
Father of the Bride TV series, 1961

Fahey's most sustained television work was a starring role in the one-season (1961–62) series Father of the Bride, based on a film of the same name starring Spencer Tracy and Elizabeth Taylor. Fahey likely got the role because, as one newspaper reviewer pointed out, she "looks enough like Liz Taylor to be her sister." Fahey was not flattered by the comparison, however, telling one interviewer "the fact that I'm supposed to look like Elizabeth Whats-Her-Name had nothing to do with my getting [the part], because we don't really look alike I don't think, we just happen to have the same colorings." Fahey wanted to be released from the show even before it came up for renewal, reportedly feeling too much emphasis was being placed on the "father" character and not enough on her "bride". She also portrayed Jennifer Ivers on the TV version of Peyton Place.

Fahey made four guest appearances on the drama series Perry Mason: Lydia Logan in the 1960 episode, "The Case of the Nimble Nephew"; defendant Grace Halley in the 1961 episode "The Case of the Violent Vest"; murder victim Myrna Warren in the 1965 episode "The Case of the Gambling Lady"; and defendant Holly Andrews in the 1966 episode "The Case of the Midnight Howler". In 1966, she played Blaze in the Batman episodes "True or False-Face" and "Holy Rat Race".

== Later life ==
Fahey became an avid skier in California. She invested in stocks and one of her contracts stipulated that she have a stock ticker in her dressing room. In addition to dating baseball player Joe DiMaggio, she dated actor George Hamilton.

Fahey became the subject of death threats while dating baseball great Joe DiMaggio in 1964. The FBI determined the threats came from a patient at the Agnews Developmental Center, a mental hospital in San Jose, California. Apparently the patient could not bear to see DiMaggio with anyone other than Marilyn Monroe, who had died in 1962.

Fahey died on May 6, 1973, at age 40, at St. John's Hospital in Santa Monica, after a long battle with cancer. She is buried in Mount Pleasant Catholic Cemetery in Bangor, Maine.

== Filmography ==
Film (by year of first release)
| Year | Title | Role | Notes |
|---|---|---|---|
| 1955 | I Died a Thousand Times | Margie (Uncredited) | Working title was A Handful of Clouds but took the final title from another WB film then renamed The Steel Jungle |
| 1957 | Loving You | 3rd Autograph Seeker (Uncredited) | |
| 1957 | Jeanne Eagels | Girl (Uncredited) | |
| 1958 | The Light in the Forest | Hannah Moore (Uncredited) | Filmed in 1957; gained publicity, despite being an uncredited role |
| 1959 | Imitation of Life | Iris Dawn (Uncredited) | |
| 1959 | Face of a Fugitive | Janet Hawthorne | Her first credited film role, this had the working title of Justice Ends with a Gun |
| 1959 | The Story on Page One | Alice | |
| 1960 | House of Usher | Madeline Usher | |

== Television: 1953-1959 ==
Television: 1953-1959 (in original broadcast order)
| Year | Series | Episode | Role | Notes |
|---|---|---|---|---|
| 1953 | Queen for a Day | (Game Show) | Herself (Uncredited) | She displayed and modeled prizes for an unknown number of episodes |
| 1954 | Cavalcade of America | Margin for Victory | | Story set during the Revolutionary War about the Culper spy ring |
| 1955 | This Is Your Music | A Touch of Paris | Herself | Billed as "Guest Dancing Star" for this local show on KNXT in Los Angeles |
| 1955 | King's Row | Lady in Fear | Renee | |
| 1957 | Matinee Theater | Night Train to Chicago | | Her character was one of eight people in a railway car facing a crisis |
| 1957 | Matinee Theater | The Queen of Spades | Juana | Her co-star was John Barrymore Jr in this adaption of Pushkin's classic |
| 1957 | The West Point Story | Cold Peril | Nora | |
| 1957 | Matinee Theater | (Unknown Episodes) | | Interviews mention she did up to eight Matinee Theater shows but only three are known for sure. |
| 1957 | Matinee Theater | The Lost Survivors | | She and William Hudson portrayed publicity shy airplane crash survivors |
| 1958 | Zorro | Shadow of Doubt | Maria Crespo | |
| 1958 | Zorro | Garcia Stands Accused | Maria Crespo | |
| 1958 | Zorro | Slaves of the Eagle | Maria Crespo | |
| 1958 | Burns and Allen | Ronnie's Fan Club | Barbara Westrope | |
| 1958 | Harbor Command | Killer on My Doorstep | Vivian Garland | This episode was also known as Held Hostage |
| 1958 | Burns and Allen | The Publicity Marriage | Barbara Westrope | |
| 1958 | Gunsmoke | Innocent Broad | Linda Bell | |
| 1958 | Zorro | The Man with a Whip | Maria Crespo | |
| 1958 | The Adventures of Superman | All That Glitters | Miss Dunn | |
| 1958 | The Gray Ghost | The Hero | Barbara | |
| 1958 | Flight | Flight Surgeon | WAF Operator | |
| 1958 | Dragnet | | | That she appeared on the show is known only from a beauty tips column |
| 1958 | Tom Swift | Pilot Episode | Tom's Girlfriend | This was an unsold pilot produced by Jack Wrather with Gary Vinson as Tom Jr |
| 1958 | Burns and Allen | The Grammar School Dance | Barbara Westrope | (Uncredited) |
| 1958 | The Ed Wynn Show | Sincerely, Sam Hill | Pauline | Her recurring character was a small town college co-ed in need of housing |
| 1958 | 77 Sunset Strip | A Nice Social Evening | Madge | She had a short scene and several lines but was uncredited in this crowded episode |
| 1958 | The Bob Hope Show | Deb Stars of 1958 | Herself | Bob Hope's annual parade of "new" talent; like Myrna, most with several years of credits |
| 1958 | The Ed Wynn Show | Lover's Lane | Pauline | It's likely Myrna appeared on more episodes of this series than can be documented |
| 1959 | The Ed Wynn Show | New York Adventure | Pauline | The last known episode for her recurring character on this already cancelled series |
| 1959 | Maverick | Duel at Sundown | Susie | Though credited, she had only two 20 second scenes with one or two lines in each |
| 1959 | 77 Sunset Strip | Conspiracy of Silence | Helen Charles | Seen only for thirty seconds during the episode's opening |
| 1959 | Colt .45 | The Escape | Sue | |
| 1959 | Death Valley Days | Half a Loaf | Helen | |
| 1959 | The Many Loves of Dobie Gillis | Pilot | Girl #2 | Pilot show for CBS; she was both uncredited and stuck behind a fence |
| 1959 | Hawaiian Eye | Dangerous Eden | Kay Laniel | Credit crawl was correct but newspaper publicity releases misspelled her last name as "Fayhey" |

== Television: 1960-1973 ==
Television: 1960 - 1973 (in original broadcast order)
| Year | Series | Episode | Role | Notes |
|---|---|---|---|---|
| 1960 | 77 Sunset Strip | Who Killed Cock Robin | Lynn Wells | |
| 1960 | Maverick | A Flock of Trouble | Dee Cooper | |
| 1960 | Hawaiian Eye | Second Fiddle | Della Kandinsky | |
| 1960 | Overland Trail | Vigilantes of Montana | Harriet Plummer | |
| 1960 | Perry Mason | The Case of the Nimble Nephew | Lydia Logan | |
| 1960 | Bachelor Father | Bentley and the Travel Agent | Francine Pettigrew | |
| 1960 | The Alaskans | Calico | Calico | |
| 1960 | Maverick | Mano Nera | Carla Marchese | |
| 1960 | Bonanza | Breed of Violence | Dolly Kincaid | |
| 1960 | Thriller | Girl with a Secret | Alice Page | |
| 1960 | Wagon Train | The Jane Hawkins Story | Jane Hawkins | Columnist Allen Rich noted Myrna guest starred on this NBC show... |
| 1960 | Hawaiian Eye | The Contenders | Laura Steck | ...the same night (Nov 30th) she guest starred on this ABC series |
| 1960 | Surfside 6 | The International Net | Ann Trevor | |
| 1960 | 77 Sunset Strip | The Dresden Doll | Dolly Stewart | |
| 1961 | The Americans | The Invaders | Ruth | |
| 1961 | Checkmate | Jungle Castle | Marylu Keyes | |
| 1961 | Acapulco | Death is a Smiling Man | | |
| 1961 | Perry Mason | The Case of the Violent Vest | Grace Halley | |
| 1961 | Father of the Bride | (All 34 Episodes) | Katherine "Kay" Banks | From Sep 29th, 1961 thru Jun 2nd, 1962: Her only television role as a series regular |
| 1961 | Surfside 6 | Pattern for a Frame | Valerie Grant | |
| 1961 | Straightaway | Troubleshooter | April Moore | |
| 1962 | The Hour of St Francis | Episode of January 1, 1962 | Our Lady of Guadeloupe | Despite the name, this was a 30 minute anthology series made by a crew of amateur Franciscans, with the actors working pro bono |
| 1962 | Here's Hollywood | Episode of May 31, 1962 | Herself | Candid interview show filmed in stars homes |
| 1962 | Laramie | Lost Allegiance | Sharon Helford | |
| 1963 | 77 Sunset Strip | The Night Was Six Years Long | Janie Maynor Benton | |
| 1963 | Hawaiian Eye | The Sisters | Nora Cobinder | |
| 1964 | Wagon Train | The Melanie Craig Story | Melanie Craig | |
| 1964 | The Reporter | Vote for Murder | Marilinn Shipp | |
| 1964 | Kraft Suspense Theatre | The Wine-Dark Sea | Honora Malone | |
| 1965 | Daniel Boone | The Price of Friendship | Sara | |
| 1965 | Kraft Suspense Theatre | Nobody Will Ever Know | Mrs. Janet "Jan" Banning | |
| 1965 | Perry Mason | The Case of the Gambling Lady | Myrna Warren | |
| 1965 | Laredo | Three's Company | Emily Henderson | |
| 1966 | Perry Mason | The Case of the Midnight Howler | Holly Andrews | |
| 1966 | Batman | True or False-Face | Blaze | |
| 1966 | Batman | Holy Rat Race | Blaze | |
| 1967 | The Time Tunnel | The Walls of Jericho | Rahab | Irwin Allen cast her after seeing a screen test she did for The Chase |
| 1967 | Rango | The Not So Good Train Robbery | Kit Clanton | |
| 1969 | Peyton Place | Episode #5.43 | Jennifer Ivers | |
| 1969 | Peyton Place | Episode #5.45 | Jennifer Ivers | |
| 1969 | Peyton Place | Episode #5.46 | Jennifer Ivers | |
| 1971 | Monty Nash | The Friendliest Town in the South | Roxanne | |
| 1971 | Marcus Welby, M.D. | The Best Is Yet to Be | Grace Ashley | |
| 1973 | The Great American Beauty Contest | (TV Movie) | Miss Utah Chaperone | The producers devised her bit part solely to help maintain her industry health benefits during her final illness |
