= Donna Loren =

American singer and actress (born 1947)

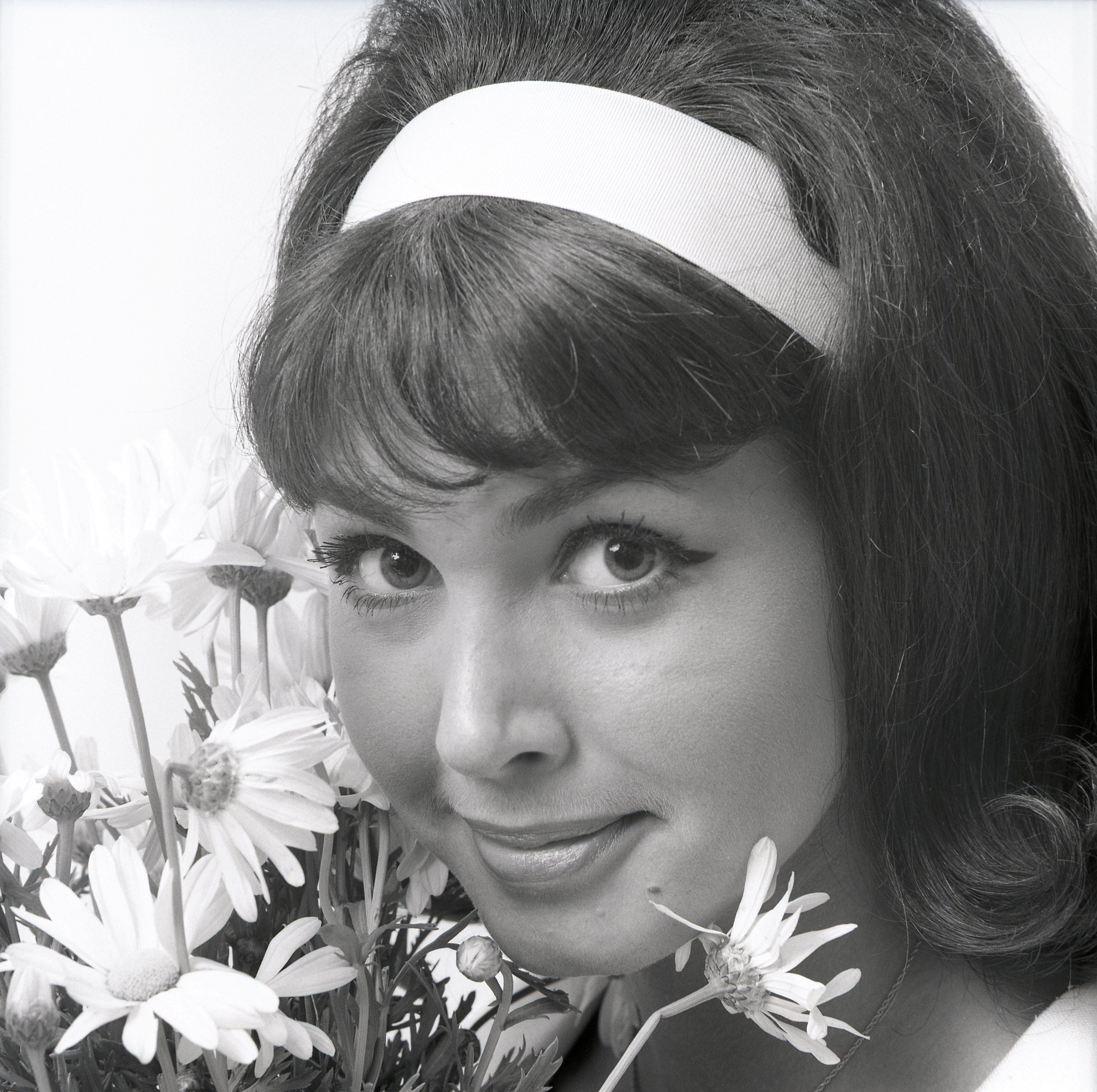
- Donna Loren in 1964
- Born: Donna Zukor; March 7, 1947 (age 79); Boston, Massachusetts, U.S
- Occupations: Singer; actress; entertainer
- Years active: 1955–present
- Known for: Beach Blanket Bingo; Shindig! Batman
- Spouse(s): Lenny Waronker (1968–1986; divorced; 3 children); Jered Cargman (1995-present; 2 children)
- Children: 5, including Joey Waronker and Anna Waronker
- Musical career
- Genres: Pop, vocal
- Instruments: Vocals, piano, keyboard
- Labels: Fable; Skylark; Ramada; Crest; Challenge; Capitol; Reprise; Royalty; Warner Bros.; Swinging Sixties
- Website: Official website

Donna Zukor (born March 7, 1947), known professionally as Donna Loren, is an American singer and actress.

A performer in the 1960s, she was the "Dr Pepper Girl" from 1963 to 1968, a featured female vocalist on Shindig!, and a cast member of the American International Pictures Beach Party movie franchise. She was signed to Capitol Records in 1964, releasing several singles and the Beach Blanket Bingo LP soundtrack, which included her signature song "It Only Hurts When I Cry".

Loren guest-starred on television series including Dr. Kildare, Batman, and The Monkees, as well as appeared regularly on network and local variety and music shows.

In 1968, Loren retired from her career to marry and raise a family. She recorded again in the 1980s and ran her own fashion business, ADASA Hawaii, throughout the 1990-2000s.

In 2009, she returned to performing, and her most recent releases include the album Love It Away (2010) and the EP Donna Does Elvis in Hawaii (2010), as well as the compilation These Are the Good Times: The Complete Capitol Recordings (2014). From 2020 to 2025, Loren co-hosted Love's A Secret Weapon Podcast with Adam Gerace, an audio memoir of her life and career.

== Early years ==
On March 7, 1947, Donna Zukor was born in Boston, Massachusetts. Loren performed in amateur talent shows from the age of six and, in 1955, sang on a radio commercial for Meadow Gold Ice Cream alongside Dick Beals. In the same year, she was a regular performer on the music radio series Sqeakin' Deacon with James Burton. By 1956, she was performing with The Moppets Group and she recorded a single, "I Think It's Almost Christmas Time" (Fable).

On March 7, 1957, her tenth birthday, Loren filmed an appearance on The Mickey Mouse Club for the Friday "Talent Round-Up Day", performing the songs "I Didn't Know the Gun was Loaded" and "Pennies from Heaven". Loren continued to perform and record through the late 1950s and early 1960s, with her songs released on Skylark and Ramada, as well as the American Publishing Company's new label Crest. Her first two efforts for that label–"Hands Off", written by Billy Page and arranged by Gene Page, and Glen Campbell's "I'm So Lonely"–were produced by Jimmy Bowen. At Crest, she began to use the professional name Donna Loren. She had previously performed under the name Donna Zukor, and recorded under the names Donna Zuker, Donna Dee, and Barbie Ames. In 1960, Loren appeared on the Playhouse 90 episode "In the Presence of Mine Enemies".

From 1962 to 1963, Loren recorded with Challenge. She released six singles, including "I'm in Love with the Ticket Taker at the Bijou Movie" (B Side: "I'm Gonna Be All Right", subsequently re-released as an A Side, with "Johnny's Got Something"), "On the Good Ship Lollipop" (B Side: "If You Love Me (Really Love Me)"), and "Dream World" (B side: "(Remember Me) I'm the One Who Loves You"). Nancy Mantz and Dave Burgess co-wrote two of Loren's Challenge songs (they also wrote one song each with other collaborators), and her arrangers included Sonny Bono. Loren's recording of "Dream World", written by Joy Kennedy, was awarded four stars by Billboard in their new singles reviews. While only in her mid-teens, Loren recorded songs such as "If You Love Me (Really Love Me)" and "(Remember Me) I'm the One Who Loves You". Loren said of her early recording: "Somehow I had a knowledge in me that came through my voice and therefore more mature songs were chosen and adapted for recording."

== Career ==
=== Dr Pepper ===
In 1963, while still a student at Venice High School in West Los Angeles, Loren signed a contract with Dr Pepper as the "Dr Pepper Girl" to promote the drink to a younger demographic. One of her first appearances for the company as its spokesperson was co-hosting, with Dick Clark, the ABC television one-hour special Celebrity Party. She performed "Bill Bailey" and her record "I Can't Make My Heart Say Goodbye".

Dr Pepper historian Harry E. Ellis described Loren as "an immediate success", writing that she "would figure prominently in Dr Pepper’s plans for some five years, not only as an entertainer but doing commercials for radio and TV and appearing in many forms of advertising." Loren made hundreds of personal appearances for the company, where she would perform and meet fans.

Loren and Dick Clark appeared at the 1964 New York World's Fair as "host and hostess" for winners of a Dr Pepper promotion. In the same year, she was part of Clark's Caravan of Stars 22-city summer tour, which was headlined by Gene Pitney and included other artists such as Brian Hyland, The Supremes, The Crystals, and The Shirelles. Loren said in 2011, "I travelled all over the country, and I performed for them in every city that had a Dr Pepper bottling plant. I cut all the ribbons for all the new plant openings. I did all their TV and radio commercials, and all their print advertising and billboards."

In addition to her work for Dr Pepper, Loren was chosen in 1965 by Simplicity Pattern company to appear in a national advertisement campaign "If I Can Sew, You Can Sew", appearing in print and commercials. Loren was contractually signed because she made much of the wardrobe she appeared in during television and live performances. Francesco Scavullo took her portrait for Simplicity.

Loren was often featured in modelling and fashion spots geared towards teenagers, including for hats, exercise workouts, makeup, and dental care. She regularly appeared on the cover of Teen magazine, as well as other teen, television, and movie magazines.

=== Film, television, and recording career ===
In 1964, Loren began appearing in the American International Pictures Beach Party series starring Frankie Avalon and Annette Funicello. In Loren's first appearance in Muscle Beach Party, she sang "Muscle Bustle" with Dick Dale. The Galveston Daily News wrote "It didn't take long for Donna, Dr Pepper's new singing star to make her mark. She has a feature singing part". The release of the single "Muscle Bustle", written by Brian Wilson, Gary Usher, and Roger Christian would be Loren's final recording for Challenge (B Side: "How Can I Face the World").

Loren then appeared in Bikini Beach (singing "Love's a Secret Weapon"), and Pajama Party (singing "Among the Young"). An article regarding the release of Pajama Party described "the amazingly-voiced Donna Loren, seventeen-year-old songstress who made her debut in Muscle Beach Party and who makes a bigger impression each time she sings. She will be seen and heard next in Beach Blanket Bingo". She appeared in the series in the fifth film Beach Blanket Bingo in 1965, performing "It Only Hurts When I Cry", which some regard as her "signature tune". The film resulted in Loren's first album, Beach Blanket Bingo. Loren said of the recording of the album: "I worked for 14 hours straight. The album was completed in that session." The album was released on Capitol Records, which Loren had signed with in 1964, produced by David Axelrod, and arranged and conducted by H. B. Barnum.

Loren also appeared in another AIP Beach Party film, Sergeant Deadhead, where she sang "Two Timin' Angel". The film starred other regular Beach Party actors, including Frankie Avalon, Deborah Walley, Harvey Lembeck, John Ashley, Bobbi Shaw, and Buster Keaton.

At Capitol, Loren released many of her well-known songs including "Blowing Out the Candles" and (B Side) "Just a Little Girl" (1964), which were produced by Axelrod and arranged and conducted by Barnum, "So, Do The Zonk" (B Side: "New Love" from her LP) (1965), "Call Me" (B Side: "Smokey Joe's"), (1965), and "I Believe" (1965; regularly performed in her Dr Pepper appearances).

In late 1964, the Hollywood Makeup Artists and Hair Stylists Guild named Loren one of its Deb Stars, an annual award given to up-coming performers, who were "the likeliest candidates for motion picture and television stardom in the coming years". Other "most likely star candidates of 1965" were Janet Landgard, Margaret Mason, Tracy McHale, Mary Ann Mobley, Barbara Parkins, Laurie Sibbald, Wendy Stuart, Beverly Washburn, and Raquel Welch. Loren was also nominated for a 1965 Photoplay Gold Medal Award for "Most Promising New Star (Female)". She received a GeeGee Award for "Most Promising Singer" from 16 Magazine in 1965.

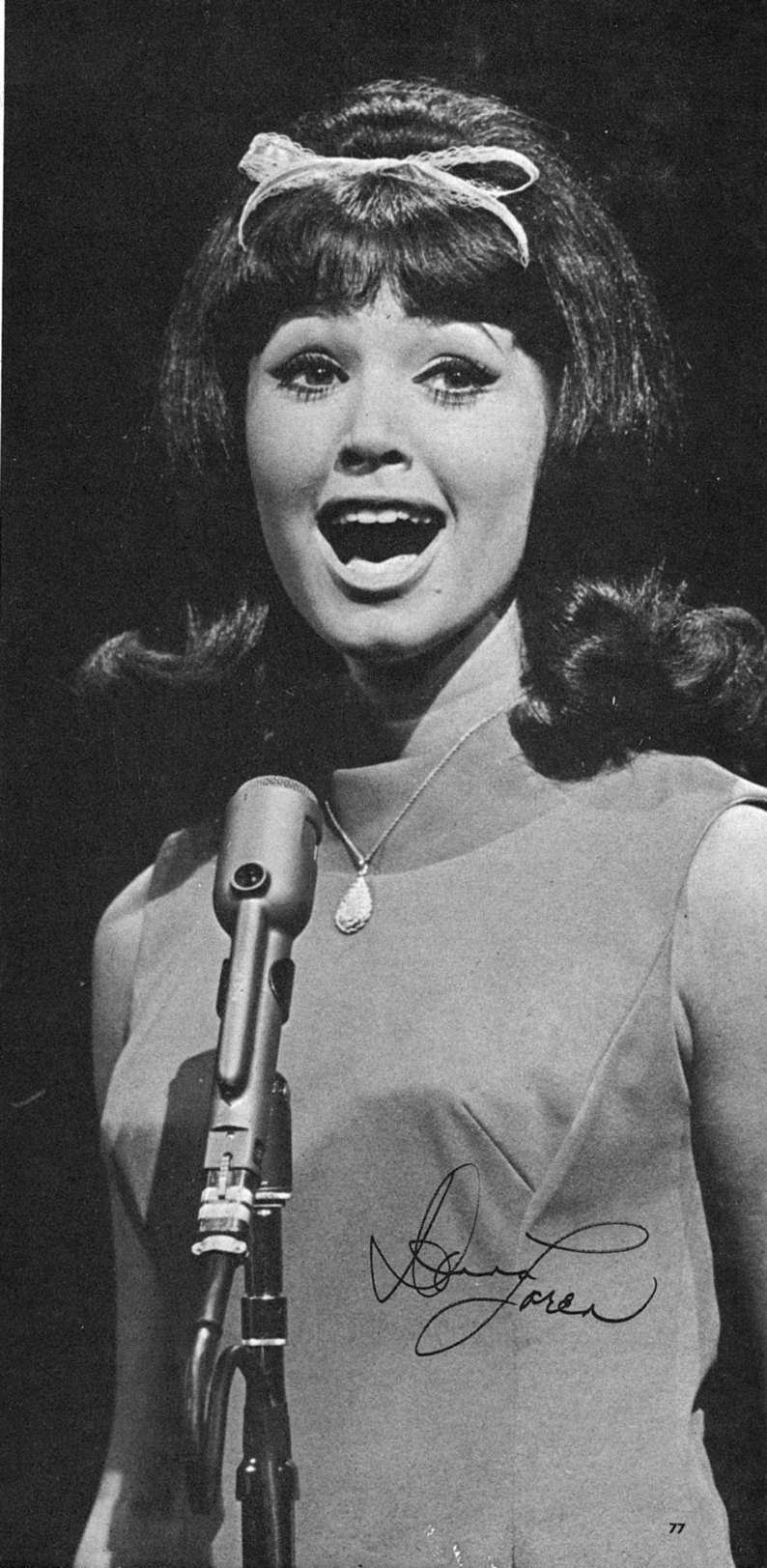
Loren performing "Wishin' and Hopin'" on Shindig!

Loren was the featured female vocalist on Shindig! from its debut on September 16, 1964, until late 1965. Loren debuted on the program performing "Wishin' and Hopin'". On the series, Loren performed a wide range of material both in solos and work with other performers, most often Bobby Sherman. Loren has discussed her enjoyment of appearing on the series, saying in 2005: "The microphone that I used was the greatest. I loved the sounds that came out". Loren sang on 26 shows, and also appeared in the live theatre show Shindig '65. In 1991, Loren appeared with several other cast members in the VH1 retrospective special of the series, The Shindig Show.

From the mid-1960s, Loren began guest-starring more frequently on drama and comedy series. She guest-starred on a seven-part Dr. Kildare in 1965 as Anna Perrona, a young woman in need of dialysis treatment. In 1966, she played Susie in two episodes (15 and 16) of Batman ("The Joker Goes to School", "He Meets His Match, the Grisly Ghoul"). In a guide to the week's television, her character was described as "Aiding The Joker is Donna Loren, a frisky cheerleader". Loren's kiss with Batman co-star Burt Ward (Robin) was reportedly accompanied by "a flood of mail". Loren also guest-starred on The Monkees (episode: "Everywhere a Sheik, Sheik", 1967) as Princess Colette, who Davy is set to marry; and on Gomer Pyle, U.S.M.C. (episode: "Love and Goulash", 1968) as Anna Kovach, who hides a romance from her family. She also appeared on The Mothers-In-Law in 1968.

Loren made hundreds of appearances on music and game shows, including on American Bandstand, Hollywood a Go Go, Where the Action Is, The Red Skelton Show, and Hollywood Squares. She appeared on the hour-long New Talent in Young America in January 1965. Loren was also regular performer at concerts and shows during much of the decade throughout the country. These included at the teenage nightclub The Million Cellars, with Glen Campbell also on the bill, the Pasadena Teen Dances, Rock 'N Roll City with Shindig co-star Bobby Sherman, and appearing with Bob Hope and The Kingsmen at Indiana University's 'Little 500' race weekend in May 1965. She also performed at the Greater Los Angeles Press Club's 1967 "Headliner of the Year" awards, where then Governor of California Ronald Reagan was recognized as "the state's outstanding newsmaker for 1966", and crowned the 1967 "Teen Safety Queen" at the Municipal Auditorium in Dodge City. Loren wrote two separate regular columns for Movie Life Magazine: “Donna Loren’s Young Hollywood” in 1966 and “Let’s Talk it Over” in 1967.

From 1967 to 1968, Loren recorded with Reprise, releasing "Let's Pretend" (B Side: "Once Before I Die") again produced by Jimmy Bowen, and arranged by Don Peake, and "As Long as I'm Holding You" (B Side: "It's Such a Shame"), produced by Mike Post. The recordings have been called "exceptional" showcases for Loren.

On March 11, 1968, "Two for Penny" aired on The Danny Thomas Hour. Loren starred as Greek-American Penny Kanopolis, whose brothers (Michael Constantine and Lou Antonio) try to organize a courtship and marriage to Yani (Gregory Rozakis), even though she is already dating another boy, the non-Greek David (Bill Bixby). Danny Thomas played the family priest. This was a pilot for Loren's own series, produced by Thomas and Aaron Spelling and was aired on NBC as a one-hour special.

By the end of 1968, Loren left show business to marry producer Lenny Waronker and raise a family.

== Post-retirement ==
=== 1980s ===
Loren began recording again during the 1980s. In 1982 she released "Sedona", (B Side: "Simply Loving You"). She wrote and produced the songs for her own label Royalty Records. James Burton produced "Sedona" with Loren, played guitar and assembled other members of the Elvis Presley TCB Band, Ronnie Tutt (drums), Jerry Scheff (bass), and Glen D. Hardin (piano). Chris Hillman played mandolin. In the same year, Loren recorded "Wishin' and Hopin'" in Nashville with her longtime producer Jimmy Bowen with David Hungate from Toto (B Side: "Somewhere Down the Road"; Warner Bros).

Loren appeared on The Merv Griffin Show in 1984 performing "Somewhere Down the Road". Other guests were Ed Asner, Sybil Danning, and Larry Miller. In introducing Loren to much applause, Griffin acknowledged Loren's return with the new single "after a long hiatus". In the same year, Loren produced a live concert in Sedona, Arizona she called "Star Series" based on the American Composer of the Year. She hired Henry Mancini, 1983 Composer of the Year, and the Flagstaff Symphony Orchestra, and in her introduction she sang "Always" by Irving Berlin. In 1985 Loren was invited to appear in Tokyo, Japan at an International Ballroom Dancing event, and also opened for Jerry Lee Lewis in a show in Beverly Hills, CA.

=== Fashion design and retail business ===
Moving to Hawaii in 1995 with husband Jered Cargman, Loren began designing clothes there. After premiering a couture collection in 1998 and being chosen by Honolulu Magazine as one of Hawaii's best new designers, she and Cargman launched ADASA Hawaii, which included a boutique in Waimea and three boutiques on Oahu, including an e-concept store. In 2004, Loren was guest stylist on an episode of A Makeover Story, with one of her boutiques featured on the show. ADASA Hawaii boutiques carried Loren's own designs, as well as lines such as Juicy Couture, Isabella Fiore, James Perse, Lacoste, and Seven jeans. Loren and Cargman ran ADASA Hawaii from 1998 until 2008.

=== Return to performing ===
In 2009, Loren and her husband Jered Cargman started the label Swinging Sixties Productions that, in conjunction with Swinging Sixties Music, publishes and releases Loren's music. Loren's first release in August 2009 was a remake of "It Only Hurts When I Cry", which she produced and arranged, releasing it both as a music video on YouTube and as a single to download. Drew Saber played guitar on the track and appears in the music video. Maurice Gainen engineered the song, and would also engineer Loren's album Love It Away.

Also in 2009, Loren's Magic: The 80's Collection was released, both as a download and later as an enhanced CD. Magic was a collection of songs Loren recorded at Amigo Studios during the early 1980s, with musicians such as John Thomas and James Burton. Seven of the songs on the album had not previously been released.

In January 2010, Love It Away was released, first as a download and then as an album. It was Loren's first album of completely new material since 1965. Loren produced the album, and it was recorded at Lava Tracks. Maurice Gainen engineered the album, with Gainen and Charles Michael Brotman mixing and mastering. Mark Arbeit photographed Loren for the album cover, which includes her wearing one of her own designs. Love It Away contains covers and eight original songs by Loren. A review on MuzikReviews.com gave the album four stars, stating: "One of the reasons for the success of this recording besides Donna's flat out stunning vocal performance, is the production being kept to a minimum and the instrumentation generally focuses on the keyboards highlighting the sweet sensual vocals of Ms. Loren."

The first single from the album was a remix of "Love It Away", which is also included on the CD as the final track and was released as a single to download. Several music videos in conjunction with Love It Away. "Shakin' All Over" was released as two videos in March and May 2010 and both include footage from her original performance of the song on Shindig!. "Love It Away" was released in March 2010 and "Last Night I Had a Dream" and "I'll Be Your Baby Tonight" in July 2010.

In May 2010, Loren released a medley of her Beach Party songs "Beach Blanket Bingo", "Muscle Bustle", "Love's a Secret Weapon", "It Only Hurts When I Cry", and "Among the Young". A video of the recording session at Lava Tracks Studios was also released on YouTube. Loren recorded new versions of "Beach Blanket Bingo" and "Muscle Bustle", as singles to download. Loren again worked with Charles Michael Brotman on this project.

In July 2010, Loren released the dance-electronic "Eloquent" as a single to download. She wrote and produced the song.

On November 1, 2010, the single "Merry Christmas Baby" was officially released for download (having been pre-released in the Donna Loren Store on her website a few days before the official release). Written by Lou Baxter and Johnny Moore and first recorded by Johnny Moore's Three Blazers in 1947, the R&B standard was recorded by Elvis Presley for his album Elvis Sings the Wonderful World of Christmas (1971). The release is Loren's second recording of a Christmas song; the first was "I Think It's Almost Christmas Time" when she was 10 years old. She also performed "Santa Claus Is Coming to Town" on Shindig! in 1964.

The song was followed by the release of Donna Does Elvis in Hawaii on November 15, 2010, an EP of her renditions of four Presley songs. In addition to "Merry Christmas Baby", Loren recorded "Loving You", "(Let Me Be Your) Teddy Bear", and "One Night". "Loving You" and "(Let Me Be Your) Teddy Bear" were both recorded in 2010, with a sample of "Loving You" appearing on Loren's blog two months prior to the release. "One Night" was recorded in the 1980s at Amigo Studios and, like many of the songs on her 2009 album Magic from these recording sessions, had not been previously released. The EP was produced by Loren, and she again worked with Maurice Gainen and Charles Michael Brotman and musician Jamieson Trotter, as well as new collaborators Sonny Lim and Wailau Ryder.

The EP makes use of a number of themes related to Loren, Elvis Presley, Hawaii, and Hollywood. Loren explained on radio show The Sheena Metal Experience (LA Talk Radio) on November 4, 2010, the evolving of the concept:

"When I was looking for just the right [Christmas] song to do, I thought of Elvis. And so when I started doing research to do a Christmas song of Elvis', I started seeing songs that really resonated with me, especially a song called "Loving You" which, when the time drew nearer when we were departing Hawaii, was so healing for me."

The song "Loving You" was recorded at Lava Tracks Studio and represented Loren's moving from "my beloved Hawaii" to California. The selection of other Presley songs further fits the concept nature of the EP for, as Loren acknowledged, "Elvis and Hawaii go hand-in-hand". The artwork for the single and the EP, both designed by Katie Waronker's company Riot Structure, blended Hawaiian-inspired imagery including Presley's 1961 LP Blue Hawaii as inspiration for the "Merry Christmas Baby" cover art, and a depiction of Kalakaua Blvd in Waikiki (with Los Angeles-inspired billboards featuring Loren, photographed by Mark Arbeit) for the cover of the EP. The back of the EP includes a picture of Loren from the 1960s.

Further links between Presley and Loren include Presley's recording "I Believe" for his EP Peace in the Valley in 1957, a song Loren also recorded at Capitol, and which she regularly performed. Loren also recorded with the Elvis Presley TCB Band for her 1980's single "Sedona" during the Amigo Studios recording sessions which also produced "One Night" from the EP.

She performed "One Night" at the 26th Annual Elvis Birthday Bash at the Echo in Los Angeles on January 8, 2012, and again performed at the 28th Annual Elvis Birthday Bash at the Echo on January 5, 2014.

On February 25, 2012, "Moonlight Kisses" was released as a single to download. The song was written and produced by Loren, and she again worked with guitarist Charles Michael Brotman.

Loren accompanied the release of her new material with numerous appearances on radio shows, interviews, and public appearances. An article in Beverly Hills Courier in March 2010 profiled her new work, beginning with "Donna Loren was the "It Girl" long before Paris Hilton and Kim Kardashian hit the streets of Beverly Hills".

She hosted a "Beach Party Movie Marathon" (Muscle Beach Party and Beach Blanket Bingo were shown) presented by American Cinematheque at the Egyptian Theatre, Hollywood on February 11, 2010, debuting the medley of her Beach Party songs. She would sing the medley and "Love It Away" for a Thrillville's "Valentine's Beach Party" at The Balboa Theatre, San Francisco on February 14, 2010, which screened Beach Blanket Bingo, and performed again at "Movie Night at the Blue Dragon" at the Blue Dragon Coastal Cuisine and Musiquarium in Kawaihae, Hawaii on April 28, 2010.

Liz Smith included a feature on Loren in her column on March 17, 2010. On June 25, 2010, Loren was interviewed on the nationally syndicated radio show Little Steven's Underground Garage, hosted by Steven Van Zandt.

Since returning to performing in 2009, Loren regularly attends autograph shows and conventions, where she meets fans and performs. Loren performed and met fans at the three-day Rock Con Festival, held July 30 – August 1, 2010, in East Rutherford, New Jersey. Among the over 100 other artists and guests appearing were Billy Hinsche, Al Jardine, Paul Petersen, Hilton Valentine, Mary Wilson, and members of the girl-groups The Angels and The Delicates. She appeared and performed at the Monkees Convention in both 2013 (with Micky Dolenz and Peter Tork attending) and 2014 (with Dolenz, Tork, and Michael Nesmith). In 2016, she headlined the four-day Tiki Oasis festival in San Diego, performing a concert on Friday, August 19.

In 2013, Loren was part of the choir for the song “If I Had the Time (I Could Change the World),” which was written and produced by Dick Wagner to benefit St. Jude Children’s Research Hospital. She performed the theme song, "The Devil Made Her Do It! (I Can’t Help It)," for the 2017 documentary Mansfield 66/67, which is also included on the film's soundtrack album.

She has regularly performed online concerts on Stageit.com under the name Donna Loren's Shindig!

On May 9, 2011, Loren performed in The Vagina Monologues, as part of V-Day Valley 2011, produced and directed by Sheena Metal at CAP (Complete Actors Place) Theater.

== Later projects ==
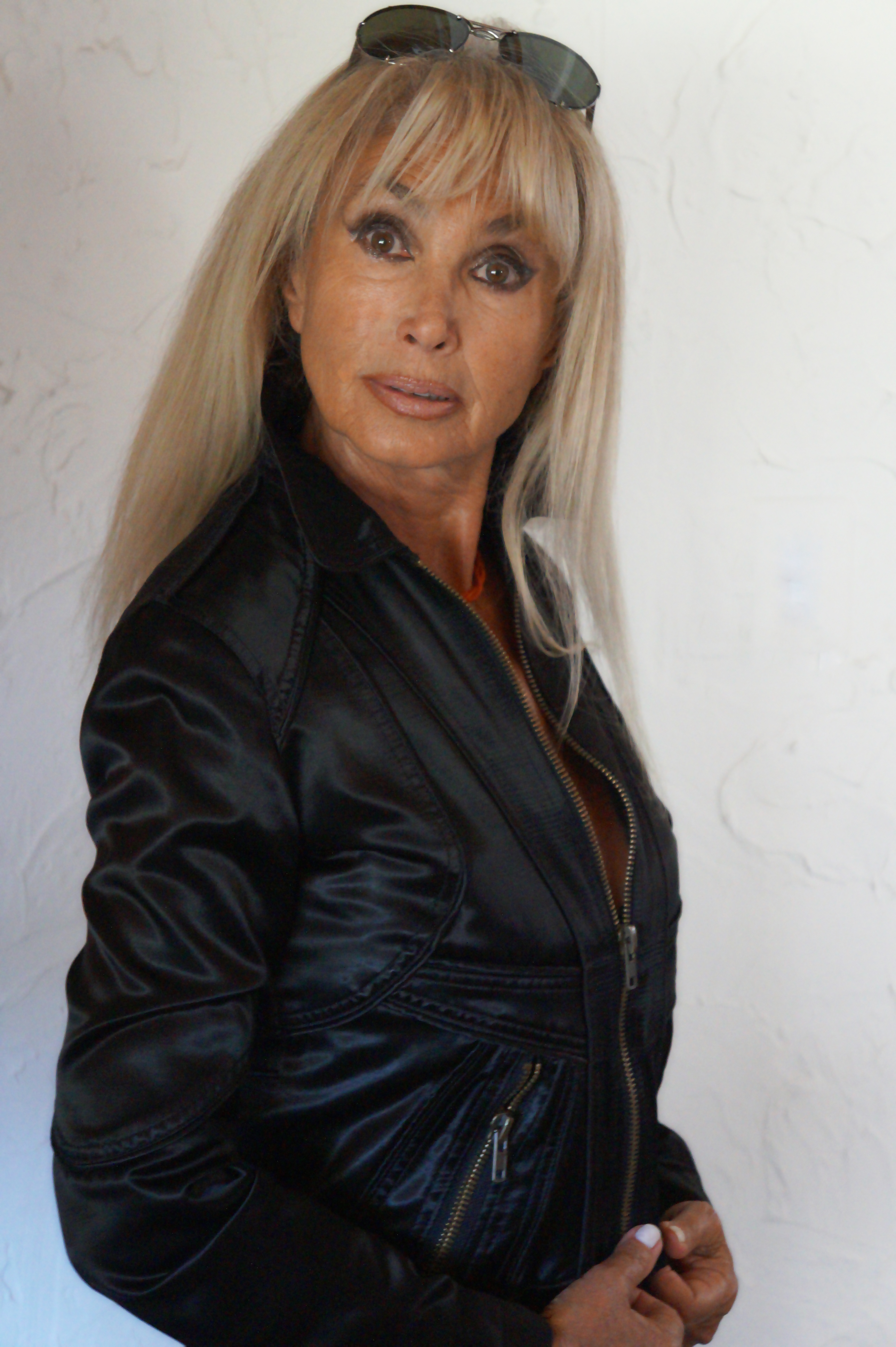
Loren in 2015

As of 2010, Loren was working on new songwriting and recording projects and a full memoir. Throughout 2015, Loren released YouTube videos as she relearnt 100 songs that she recorded and/or performed in the 1960s; a project that she continued in 2016.

In July 2017, Pop Sixties: Shindig!, Dick Clark, Beach Party, and Photographs from the Donna Loren Archive, a photographic retrospective of Loren's career with narrative by Loren and Domenic Priore, and photos by her adopted father Morey Zukor, was released by Rare Bird Books. She promoted the book at book signings and personal appearances, in print interviews, and on radio and television, including the TV interview series Ken Boxer Live on April 19, 2018 (TVSB), Studio 411 hosted by Larry DaSilva on May 30, 2018 (Nutmeg TV), and LIVE Magazine TV on June 30, 2018 (KPSE).

On October 20, 2017, Loren, a graduate of the class of 1963, was inducted into the Venice High School Hall of Fame at the school's Homecoming.

In August 2020, Loren began hosting Love's A Secret Weapon Podcast, an audio memoir involving Loren reading passages from her completed memoir manuscript and conversations with her collaborator Dr. Adam Gerace. As of April 2025, 88 episodes had been released. Guests included Darlene Love, Brian Hyland, David Mallet, Bobbie Shaw Chance, Salli Sachse, Paul Petersen, and Walter Egan.

On April 18, 2022, Loren released a single, "God Only Knows", a song she wrote and produced. On April 8, 2025, she released a duet with Walter Egan of his song "Magnet and Steel".

== Personal life ==
Loren grew up in the Los Angeles neighborhood of Mar Vista, with her mother Ruth, adoptive father Morey Zukor, and two younger brothers, Alan and Rick. Both her adoptive father and uncle, Louis Zukor, were animators. Loren's adoptive father managed her 1960s career and was her chaperone for personal appearances and on television and movie sets. He was also her personal photographer, with many of his photos utilized by publications at the time, as well as in Loren's 2017 book Pop Sixties.

In 1968, Loren married music producer Lenny Waronker, later president of Warner Bros. Records, and had three children: Joey, Anna, and Katherine. They divorced in the mid 1980s. In 1995, Loren married Jered Cargman. Loren and Cargman, who was a member of the surf band The Fantastic Baggys, knew each other in the 1960s and Cargman was her prom date.

== Discography ==
Beach Blanket Bingo (1965, Capitol)

Song (Writers)
Side One
1. Cycle Set (Gary Usher, Roger Christian)
2. I Think, You Think (Guy Hemric, Jerry Styner)
3. It Only Hurts When I Cry (Guy Hemric, Jerry Styner)
4. These Are the Good Times (Guy Hemric, Jerry Styner)
5. I'll Never Change Him (Guy Hemric, Jerry Styner)
Side Two
6. Fly Boy (Guy Hemric, Jerry Styner)
7. New Love (Guy Hemric, Jerry Styner)
8. I Am My Ideal (Guy Hemric, Jerry Styner)
9. Beach Blanket Bingo (Guy Hemric, Jerry Styner)
10. Freeway (Mike Curb) [instrumental]

Beach Blanket Bingo produced by David Axelrod, arranged and conducted by H. B. Barnum.

Magic: The 80's Collection (2009, Swinging Sixties Productions)

Song (Writers)	Producers	Personnel
1. Could This Be Magic (Donna Loren)	Donna Loren, James Burton, M. Delevie	
2. Thinkn' of You (Donna Loren)	Donna Loren	
3. Wishin' and Hopin' (Bacharach, David)	Jimmy Bowen, Donna Loren	Arranged by Nick DeCaro. Guitar: David Hugante, Piano: John Thomas. Additional vocals: Ry Cooder's back-up singers.
4. Hard to Believe (B. Hyde, J. Abelson)	Randy Stern	Note: Also included on CD – Video Live Performance at Imperial Hotel, Tokyo (1985).
5. Sedona (Donna Loren)	Donna Loren, James Burton	Drums: Ronnie Tutt, Bass: Jerry Scheff, Piano: Glen D. Hardin, Guitar: James Burton, Mandolin: Chris Hillman.
6. Simply Loving You (Donna Loren)	Donna Loren, M. Delevie	Piano: John Thomas. Violin: Talia, Drums: Alan Zukovsky (Loren's brother)
7. Somewhere Down the Road (C. Weil, T. Snow)	Donna Loren, Nick DeCaro	Arranged by Nick DeCaro. Engineered by Lee Herschberg. Cello: Eleanor Slatkin
8. Eulogy of a Marriage (Donna Loren)	Donna Loren	Piano: John Thomas
9. U Speak 2 Me (Donna Loren)	Donna Loren	Piano: John Thomas
10. Real Morning Kisses (Donna Loren)	Donna Loren	Piano: John Thomas
11. Could This Be Magic (unplugged) (Donna Loren)	Donna Loren	Piano: John Thomas

Love It Away (2010, Swinging Sixties Productions)

Song (Writers)	Personnel
1. Last Night I Had A Dream (Randy Newman)	Keyboards: Jamieson Trotter, Synthesizer: Charles Michael Brotman
2. Shakin' All Over (Johnny Kidd)	Keyboards: Trotter, Clapping: Trotter and Loren
3. Love It Away (Donna Loren)	Keyboards, Synthesizer: Trotter, Bass: Bob Glaub
4. Only Love (Donna Loren)	Keyboards, Synthesizer: Trotter, Bass: Glaub, Solo Piano Ending: Loren.
5. OK (Donna Loren)	Keyboards: Trotter, Bass: Glaub
6. Be Your Best Friend (Donna Loren)	Keyboards: Trotter, Background Vocals: Maelan Abran, Loren
7. We are Woman (Donna Loren)	Keyboards, Synthesizer: Trotter, Bass: Glaub, Background Vocals: Abran, Loren
8. UR (Donna Loren)	Keyboards, Synthesizer, Accordion: Trotter, Bass: Glaub, Background Vocals: Abran, Loren
9. Live Nude Cabaret (Jackson Browne)	Keyboards: Trotter, Bass: Glaub
10. Don't Bring Me Down (Jeff Lynne)	Keyboards: Trotter, Bass: Carol Kaye
11. Old Man (Neil Young)	Keyboards: Trotter, Synthesizer: Loren
12. Still Love You (Donna Loren)	Keyboards: Trotter, Synthesizer, Background Vocals: Loren
13. I'll Be Your Baby Tonight (Bob Dylan)	Guitar: Andrew Saber, Violin: Tony Selvage, Bass: Carol Kaye
14. Satisfied Mind (Jack Rhodes, Red Hayes)	Keyboards: Loren
15. Bonus Track: Love It Away (Remix) (Donna Loren)	Arranged, Engineered by Charles Michael Brotman. Guitar, synthesizer: Brotman, Percussion, Background vocals: Loren

Love It Away produced by Donna Loren.

Donna Does Elvis in Hawaii (2010, Swinging Sixties Productions)

Song (Writers)	Personnel
1. Merry Christmas Baby (Lou Baxter, Johnny Moore)	Engineer: Maurice Gainen, Keyboards: Jamieson Trotter, Saxophone: Gainen, Drums: Clarence Harris, Background Vocals: Loren
2. Loving You (Jerry Leiber, Mike Stoller)	Engineer: Charles Michael Brotman, Bass, Ukulele: Sonny Lim, Slack Key Guitar: Wailau Ryder, Background Vocals: Loren
3. (Let Me Be Your) Teddy Bear (Kal Mann, Bernie Lowe)	Engineer: Charles Michael Brotman, Ukulele: Charles Michael Brotman, Background Vocals: Loren
4. One Night (Dave Bartholomew, Anita Steiman, Pearl King)	Engineer: Chet Hines, Piano: John Thomas, Guitar: Joey Newman, Drums: Michael Delevie

Donna Does Elvis in Hawaii produced by Donna Loren.

== Filmography ==
- Muscle Beach Party (1964)
- Bikini Beach (1964)
- Pajama Party (1964)
- Beach Blanket Bingo (1965)
- Sergeant Deadhead (1965)

== Television ==
Year	Title	Role	Notes
1966	Batman	Susie	S1:E15, "The Joker Goes to School"; S1:E16, "He Meets His Match, The Grisly Ghoul"
1967	The Monkees	Colette	S2:E3, "Everywhere a Sheik, Sheik"
1968	Gomer Pyle, U.S.M.C.	Anna	S4:E28, "Love and Goulash"

== Other releases and media ==
=== These Are the Good Times: The Complete Capitol Recordings ===
On March 7, 2014, 1960s-focused reissue label Now Sounds (distributed by Cherry Red Records) officially announced the compilation These Are the Good Times: The Complete Capitol Recordings. The CD was released from the UK-based label April 14, with the US release following on April 22, 2014.

The compilation consists of the Beach Blanket Bingo LP, all of Loren's other Capitol-released material, songs not released until the 2000s, and eight previously unreleased songs. The unreleased material includes work with producers, arrangers and writers with whom Loren worked on her released Capitol material, such as Steve Douglas and Jack Nitzsche and the song writing team of Gerry Goffin-Carole King. Other songs were written by Al Kooper, Randy Newman, and Jackie DeShannon. The new tracks also include The Wrecking Crew, who were the musicians for many of Loren's Capitol (including Beach Blanket Bingo) and earlier recordings. The CD booklet features previously unpublished photos, and liner notes from Sheryl Farber. Steve Stanley and Farber produced the compilation.

These Are the Good Times: The Complete Capitol Recordings (2014, Now Sounds)
Song (Writers)	Producer	Arranged and Conducted by	Notes
1. "Just A Little Girl" (Goffin-King)	David Axelrod	H. B. Barnum	
2. "Woman In Love (With You)" (Mann-Weil-Phil Spector)	Steve Douglas	Jack Nitzsche	
3. "It's Gotta Be" (Ron Elliott)	Steve Douglas		Previously unreleased. Featuring The Beau Brummels.
4. "Call Me" (Tony Hatch)	Steve Douglas	Jack Nitzsche	
5. "So, Do The Zonk" (L. Carr-A. Fisher)	David Axelrod	H. B. Barnum	
6. "You Can't Lose Something You Never Had" (Al Kooper-Robert Brass-Irwin Levine)	Steve Douglas	Billy Strange	Previously unreleased.
7. "They're Jealous of Me" (Goffin-King)	Steve Douglas	Jack Nitzsche	Previously unreleased.
8. "That's the Boy" (Mann-Weil)	Steve Douglas	Jack Nitzsche	
9. "My Way"	Steve Douglas	Billy Strange	Previously unreleased.
10. "Hold Your Head High" (Randy Newman-Jackie DeShannon)	Steve Douglas	Jack Nitzsche	Previously unreleased.
11. "Good Things" (D. Irvin-P. Kaufman)	David Axelrod	H. B. Barnum	Previously unreleased.
12. "Smokey Joe’s" (Valerie Simpson-Nickolas Ashford-Josephine Armstead)	Steve Douglas	Billy Strange	
13. "Play Little Music Box, Play" (Billy Page)	Al De Lory	Gene Page	
14. "Leave Him to Me" (Bob Montgomery)	David Axelrod	H. B. Barnum	Previously unreleased.
15. "Ten Good Reasons" (Buddy Kaye-Phil Springer)	David Axelrod	H. B. Barnum	
16. "Ninety Day Guarantee" (Lester Carr)	David Axelrod	H. B. Barnum	
17. "I Believe" (Ervin Drake-Irvin Graham-Jimmy Shirl-Al Stillman)	Al De Lory	Gene Page	
18. "Blowing Out the Candles" (Ben Raleigh-Bob Halley)	David Axelrod	H. B. Barnum	
19. "Drop the Drip" (C. Manning-R. Manspiel)	David Axelrod	H. B. Barnum	Previously unreleased.
20. "Cycle Set" (Gary Usher, Roger Christian)	David Axelrod	H. B. Barnum	
21. "I Think, You Think" (Guy Hemric, Jerry Styner)	David Axelrod	H. B. Barnum	
22. "It Only Hurts When I Cry" (Guy Hemric, Jerry Styner)	David Axelrod	H. B. Barnum	
23. "These Are the Good Times" (Guy Hemric, Jerry Styner)	David Axelrod	H. B. Barnum	
24. "I'll Never Change Him" (Guy Hemric, Jerry Styner)	David Axelrod	H. B. Barnum	
25. "Fly Boy" (Guy Hemric, Jerry Styner)	David Axelrod	H. B. Barnum	
26. "New Love" (Guy Hemric, Jerry Styner)	David Axelrod	H. B. Barnum	
27. "I Am My Ideal" (Guy Hemric, Jerry Styner)	David Axelrod	H. B. Barnum	
28. "Beach Blanket Bingo" (Guy Hemric, Jerry Styner)	David Axelrod	H. B. Barnum	
29. "Freeway" (Mike Curb) [instrumental]	David Axelrod	H. B. Barnum	

==== Reception ====
Professional ratings
Review scores
Source	Rating
Allmusic	4.5/5 stars

These Are the Good Times was heavily praised on its release. In his AllMusic review, Mark Deming, who gave the compilation four-and-a-half stars out of five, wrote that "the best stuff here is delicious, beautifully crafted '60s West Coast pop, with a gifted and savvy vocalist front and center." Deming considered the previously unreleased songs to be "some of the strongest material" on the album, and he felt that "there's a strength and maturity in her performances on tunes like 'A Woman in Love (With You)', 'Hold Your Head High', and 'Leave Him to Me' that outstrips a significant majority of her peers – all the more impressive considering she was just 18 when most of this was recorded."

In The Second Disc review of the album, the compilation was described as "a must for aficionados of both the girl-group and SoCal pop sound of the sixties", with writer Joe Marchese noting that "fans of the Los Angeles sound will recognize every name here, all at the top of their game: producers David Axelrod, the outré pop guru, and Steve Douglas, Wrecking Crew saxophonist; arrangers Jack Nitzsche, H. B. Barnum, Gene Page and Billy Strange; musicians Hal Blaine, Carol Kaye, Lyle Ritz, Ray Pohlman, Tommy Tedesco, Larry Knechtel, Don Randi, Plas Johnson, Julius Wechter, and future headliners Glen Campbell and Leon Russell."

Marchese singled out a number of tracks, including the Axelrod-produced, Barnum-arranged songs "Just a Little Girl", which he thought was "one of the strongest of her tenure with the label", and "Leave Him to Me", which "shows Donna cutting loose with a convincing growl in her voice"; and the Douglas-produced, Nitzsche-arranged songs "Call Me", finding it "inexplicable that she didn’t chart with it", "Donna’s sublime rendition" of "Woman in Love (With You)", and "Hold Your Head High" which was considered "another stunningly mature, previously unreleased track from the Loren/Nitzsche/Douglas/Wrecking Crew cadre." Marchese also highlighted Now Sounds "customarily impressive packaging, design and notes", and described the tracks as having been "splendidly remastered".

Joseph Kyle wrote that the album "document[s] a young talent’s creative fruits, and is a delight of a listen", while Vic Templar, in UK-based Shindig! magazine, said that Loren "comes across as a US equivalent of Kathy Kirby, Billie Davis or early Dusty", telling readers "Yes, she’s that good." As with other reviews, Now's "as-standard loving care, exhaustive sleeve notes by Sheryl Farber and stunning photographs" were praised.

These Are the Good Times was a 2014 Gold Bonus Disc Award winner, with the compilation described as "an ingenious album that never was" and "an invigorating discovery".

=== Compilations ===
Loren has been featured on a number of other compilations, including one of all her 1960s-released songs from Capitol, The Very Best of Donna Loren Featuring Beach Blanket Bingo (2000), a product of EMI-Capitol Music Special Markets and distributed by Collectables Records.

Album	Songs
The Very Best of Donna Loren Featuring Beach Blanket Bingo (Collectables Records, 2000)	All songs from Beach Blanket Bingo LP, and all of Loren's 1960's-released Capitol songs.
The Best of Donna Loren (Missing Records, 1998)	Unofficial European release, includes early songs.
Surf City Drag City (Capitol, 1986)	"Beach Blanket Bingo"
Surf & Drag Vol. 1 (Sundazed Music, 1989)	"Muscle Bustle"
Muscle Bustle: Classic Tracks from the Challenge Surf 'n' Drag Era (Ace, 1994)	"Muscle Bustle"
Playin' Hard to Get: West Coast Girls (Ace, 1995)	"Dream World", "Muscle Bustle"
Surf Bunnies & Hot Rod Honeys (Phantom, 1996)	"Cycle Set"
Girl Group Gems - Soul to Surf (Red Bird Entertainment, 2002)	"Dream World", "Muscle Bustle"
Girls Go Zonk – US Dream Babes (RPM, 2004)	"So, Do The Zonk"
The Girls of Hideaway Heaven (Rare Rockin' Records, 2004)	"Hands Off"
Sex and the '60s (Varèse Sarabande, 2006)	"Love's a Secret Weapon"
Hard Workin' Man – The Jack Nitzsche Story Volume 2 (Ace, 2006)	"Woman in Love (With You)"
Summer Beach Party: Songs from the Classic Beach Movies of the '60s (Varèse Sarabande, 2006)	"Love's a Secret Weapon", "Muscle Bustle", "It Only Hurts When I Cry" [movie version]
Goffin & King: A Gerry Goffin and Carole King Song Collection 1961–1967 (Ace, 2007)	"Just a Little Girl"
Glitter and Gold: Words and Music By Barry Mann and Cynthia Weil (Ace, 2009)	"That's the Boy"
Hey, Beach Girls! Female Surf 'n' Drag 1961–1966 (Ace, 2010)	"Cycle Set", "Beach Blanket Bingo"
Hurricane Healing Vol. 100 - Christmas Time (Hurricane Healing, 2011)	"Merry Christmas Baby"
Looking Good: 75 Femme Mod Soul Nuggets (RPM Records, 2013)	"Dream World"
Soda Pop Babies Vol. 3 (Classics Records, 2013)	"Hands Off"
Miracles: Philip Springer - The Songwriting Legacy of the 1960s (Rare Rockin' Records, 2016)	"Ten Good Reasons"
Cabinet Of Wonder: Brian Wilson Works 1960-1967 (Oldays Records, 2025)	"Muscle Bustle"
