= House of Usher (film) =

1960 film by Roger Corman

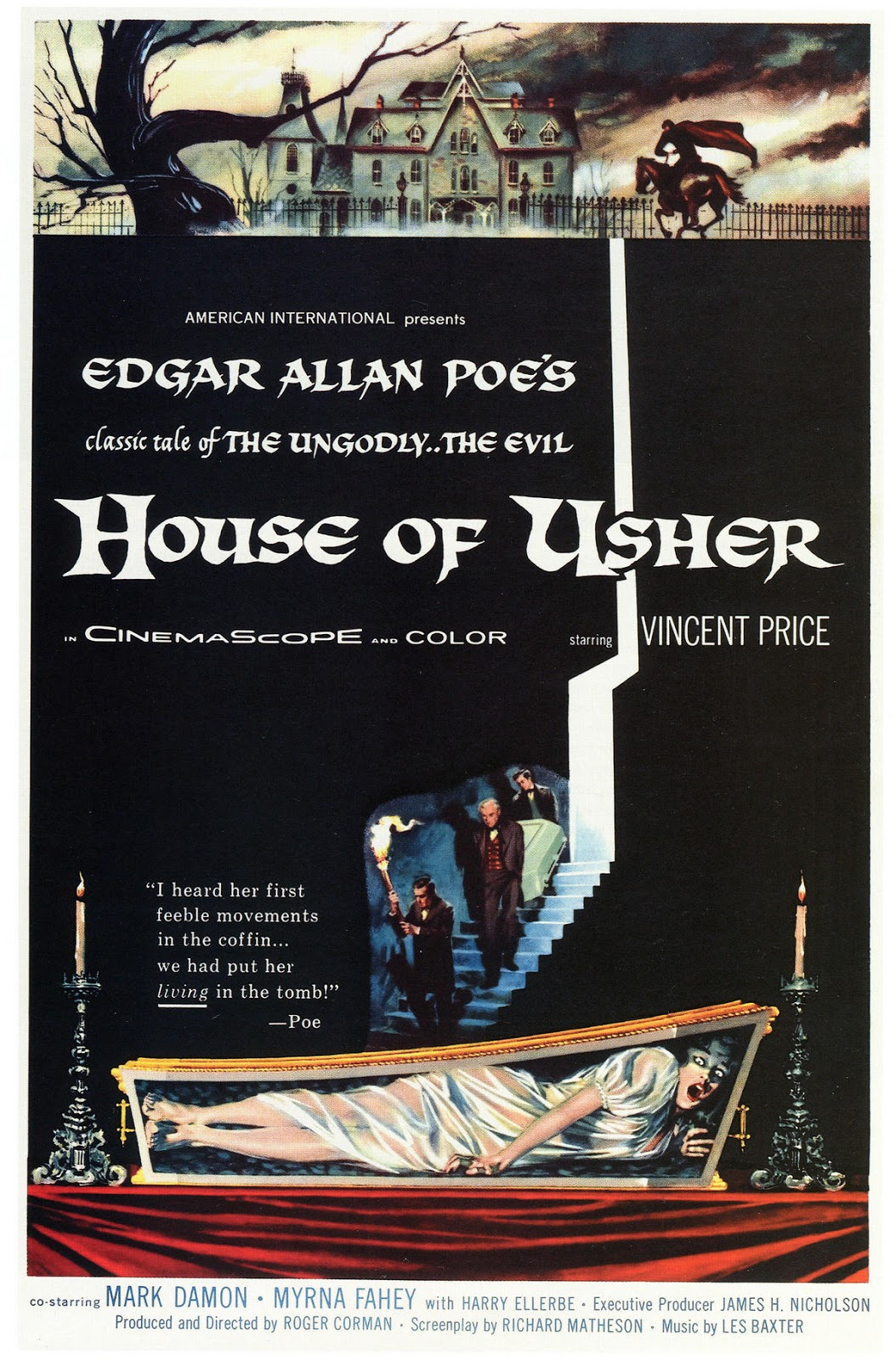
- Theatrical release poster by Reynold Brown
- Directed by: Roger Corman
- Screenplay by: Richard Matheson
- Based on: "The Fall of the House of Usher" by Edgar Allan Poe
- Produced by: Roger Corman
- Starring: Vincent Price; Mark Damon; Myrna Fahey; Harry Ellerbe
- Cinematography: Floyd Crosby
- Edited by: Anthony Carras
- Music by: Les Baxter
- Production company: Alta Vista Productions
- Distributed by: American International Pictures
- Release date: June 18, 1960
- Running time: 79 minutes
- Country: United States
- Language: English
- Budget: $300,000
- Box office: $1,450,000 (US and Canada rentals); 213,785 admissions (France)

House of Usher (also known as The Fall of the House of Usher) is a 1960 American Gothic horror film produced and directed by Roger Corman from a screenplay by Richard Matheson, based on the 1839 short story "The Fall of the House of Usher" by Edgar Allan Poe. It was the first of eight Corman–Poe feature films and stars Vincent Price, Myrna Fahey in her final feature film, Mark Damon, and Harry Ellerbe.

In 2005, the film was selected for preservation in the United States' National Film Registry as being deemed "culturally, historically, or aesthetically significant."

== Plot ==
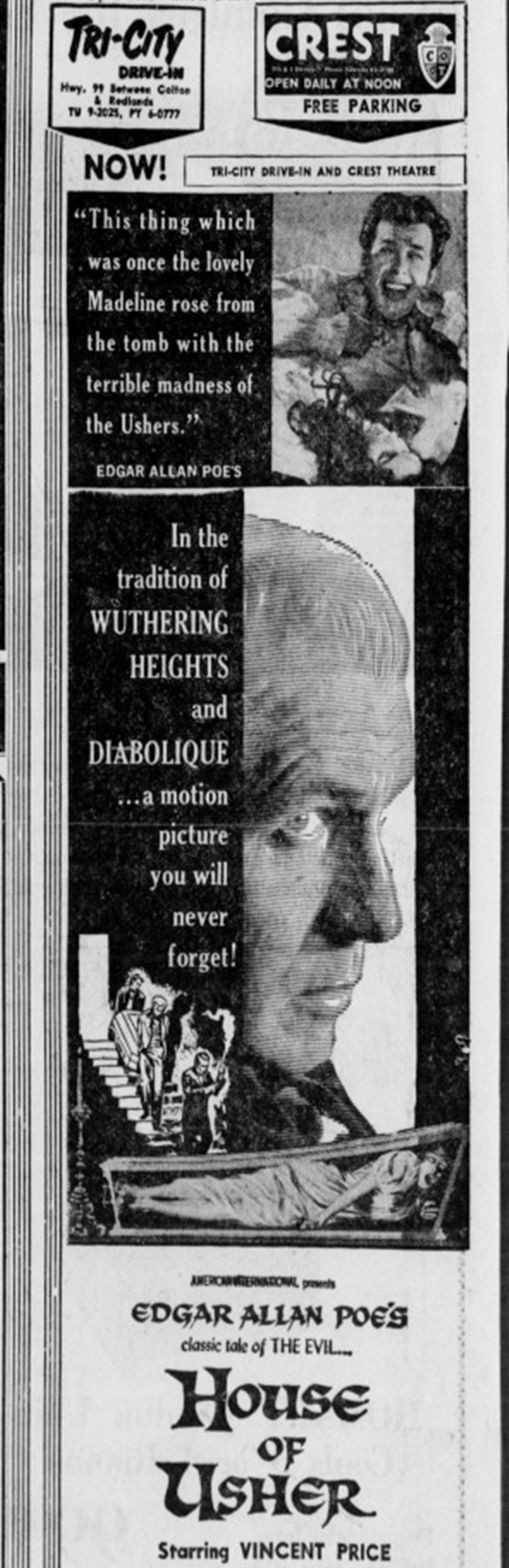
Advertisement from 1960

In the early 19th century, Philip Winthrop travels from Boston to the House of Usher, a decaying mansion surrounded by a murky swamp in rural Massachusetts, to visit his fiancée Madeline Usher, who is ill and bedridden. Madeline's brother Roderick orders Philip to leave and vehemently discourages the union, telling the young man that the Usher family is afflicted by a cursed bloodline that has driven the majority of their ancestors to madness and that he and Madeline are dying. He explains that the family members suffer from a heightened sensitivity to sensory stimuli. Nevertheless, Philip refuses to leave the house, so the butler, Bristol, shows him to a guest room.

Philip goes downstairs for dinner and is nearly struck by a falling chandelier. That night, he sneaks into Madeline's room and urges her to leave with him. When Roderick suddenly appears, Madeline accuses her brother of keeping her a prisoner, but he insists he is only being protective. The next morning, Philip brings Madeline breakfast and again implores her to leave with him. She says that although she wants to leave, she cannot because she will soon be dead. She takes Philip to a crypt in the basement, showing him the coffins of all the Usher ancestors who succumbed to madness. Suddenly, her grandmother's coffin falls and breaks open, causing Madeline to faint at the sight of her grandmother's skeletal remains.

After carrying Madeline back to her room, Roderick explains to Philip that the land surrounding the mansion was once fertile and abundant until it was ravaged by a "plague of evil". He also believes that if Madeline were to bear children, the Usher family evils would be propagated into future generations. Convinced that Roderick is insane, Philip goes to Madeline's room, and she finally agrees to leave with him to Boston. As Philip packs, he overhears Madeline and Roderick arguing and rushes to her room, only to find her seemingly dead in her bed. Roderick immediately has Madeline entombed in the family crypt.

As Philip prepares to leave, Bristol inadvertently reveals the Usher family's history of catalepsy, leading Philip to believe that Madeline may still be alive. Philip rushes to the crypt and breaks the lock on Madeline's coffin, but finds it empty. Although Roderick asserts that Madeline is now dead and in a secret place, Philip desperately searches for her. Hearing a scream from the crypt, Philip runs there and follows a trail of blood through secret passages. He makes it to a room where a crazed Madeline attempts to strangle him before running away.

Philip finds Madeline in Roderick's room where she attacks him again. During a thunderstorm, a gust of wind draws fire from the fireplace, setting the house ablaze while Madeline chokes Roderick. The two siblings and Bristol are consumed by the falling house, ending the Usher bloodline. Philip escapes and watches the burning house sink into the swampy land surrounding it.

"... and the deep and dank tarn closed silently over the fragments of the House of Usher."

— The film ends with the final words of Poe's story.

== Cast ==
- Vincent Price as Roderick Usher
- Mark Damon as Philip Winthrop
- Myrna Fahey as Madeline Usher
- Harry Ellerbe as Bristol

== Production ==
The film was important in the history of American International Pictures which up until then had specialized in making low budget black and white films to go out on double bills. The market for this kind of movie was in decline so AIP decided to gamble on making a larger budgeted film in color.

The film was announced in February 1959 and was dubbed the company's "most ambitious film to date".

A number of other companies announced Poe projects around this time: Alex Gordon had a version of Masque of the Red Death, Fox had Murders in the Rue Morgue, Ben Bogeaus The Gold Bug, and Universal The Raven.

It was shot in 15 days. The budget was $300,000, $100,000 of which went to star Vincent Price. Production designer Daniel Haller purchased sets and props from Universal Studios for $2,500 and redressed them to create the Usher mansion. The misshapen trees seen on the Usher estate were actual trees which had burned in a fire in the Hollywood Hills. To depict the burning manse, Corman had two cameramen film the burning of a barn in Orange County.

House of Usher made $1 million in the summer of 1960.

== Score ==
In February 2011, Intrada made the world premiere release of the Les Baxter score from music-only elements in mono.

No.	Title	Length
1.	"Overture"	3:03
2.	"Main Title"	2:00
3.	"Roderick Usher"	4:02
4.	"Madeline Usher"	2:50
5.	"Tormented"	2:24
6.	"Lute Song"	1:00
7.	"Reluctance"	3:58
8.	"The Sleepwalker"	4:12
9.	"The Vault"	2:36
10.	"The Ancestors"	2:58
11.	"House of Evil"	4:53
12.	"Catalepsy"	4:13
13.	"Pallbearers"	2:03
14.	"Buried Alive"	8:14
15.	"Fall of The House of Usher"	13:50
Total length:		1:02:16

== Reception ==
Eugene Archer, in the September 15, 1960 edition of The New York Times wrote, "American-International, with good intentions of presenting a faithful adaption of Edgar Allan Poe's classic tale of the macabre...blithely ignored the author's style. Poe's prose style, as notable for ellipsis as imagery, compressed or eliminated the expository passages habitual to nineteenth-century fiction and invited the readers' imaginations to participate." He further opined, "Under the low-budget circumstances, Vincent Price and Myrna Fahey should not be blamed for portraying the decadent Ushers with arch affectation, nor Mark Damon held to account for the traces of Brooklynese that creep into his stiffly costumed impersonation of the mystified interloper."

Other reviewers have been kinder, however; a positive assessment in Variety declared, "It's not precisely the Edgar Allan Poe short story known to high school English that emerges in House of Usher, but it's a reasonably diverting and handsomely mounted variation ... The film has been mounted with care, skill and flair by producer-director Roger Corman and his staff." Harrison's Reports called it "fairly good entertainment. Although a bit too wordy, the abundant gore, photo gimmicks, special effects and unusual theme, help keep the viewer on his seat's edge." The Monthly Film Bulletin praised the film's "unusually resourceful" camerawork as well as "an excellent central performance" from Vincent Price, finding that although Corman's direction "does not suggest a great stylist in the making, he brings off the big scenes with some invention, as well as making the most of what was probably only a medium-sized budget." Betty Martin of the Los Angeles Times called it "a better than average horror film – if that's saying much", adding that Price "does a masterful job" in his role.

On the review aggregator website Rotten Tomatoes, the film holds an approval rating of 83% based on 53 reviews, with an average rating of 7/10. The website's critics consensus reads: "Scary, strange, and maybe a little silly, House of Usher represents an early high mark for Vincent Price and a career triumph for director Roger Corman." Metacritic, which uses a weighted average, assigned the film a score of 75 out of 100, based on 8 critics, indicating "generally favorable" reviews.

== See also ==
- List of American films of 1960
- The Corman–Poe cycle
- Midnite Movies
