= True or False-Face =

- Batman episode
- Episode no.: Season 1 Episode 17
- Directed by: William A. Graham
- Written by: Stephen Kandel
- Production code: 8713-Pt. 1
- Original air date: March 9, 1966

Guest appearances
- Myrna Fahey; Billy Curtis; Joe Brooks; Chuck Fox; S. John Launer; Patrick Whyte; Mike Ragan; Michael Fox; Gary Owens; Special Guest Villain: ? as False-Face

Episode chronology
← Previous "He Meets His Match, The Grisly Ghoul"	Next → "Holy Rat Race"

"True or False-Face" is the 17th episode of the Batman television series, first airing on ABC March 9, 1966 in its first season. It guest starred Malachi Throne as False-Face.

== Plot synopsis ==
The master of disguise, False-Face, manages to steal the jeweled Mergenberg Crown and replace it with a false one right under the watchful eyes of the police. Included with the theft of the Crown, False Face challenges Batman to prove that he has committed a crime when he announces his intention to rob an armored car company. Batman catches False-Face, who is disguised as one of the armored car drivers but manages to escape in his Trick-Truck.

Batman and Robin follow False-Face into an alley, where they are attacked by False-Face's gang. The police arrive in time to arrest the gang, but False-Face escapes by disguising himself as Chief O'Hara, before gassing the real Chief O'Hara. Batman captures False-Face's assistant, Blaze, who leads the duo to what they think is False-Face's hideout, a deserted subway platform. It is in reality a False-Face trap. Batman is gassed by a vending machine, while Blaze gasses Robin. They awaken to find that False-Face has glued them to the train tracks with a super-strong epoxy. Momentarily, they will be run over a speeding train.

== Notes ==
- This episode marks the first time that the cliffhanger scene is frozen while the narrator's commentary is superimposed. The reason: the train supposedly bearing down on them was merely a light at the end of a dark corridor, and keeping the camera rolling would have made it clear that the light was not moving.
- Much to his chagrin, Malachi Throne (False-Face) was credited as simply "?" until the closing credits of "Holy Rat Race" (where he finally received proper billing).

Preceded by He Meets His Match, The Grisly Ghoul (airdate March 3, 1966)	Batman (TV series) episodes March 9, 1966	Succeeded by Holy Rat Race (airdate March 10, 1966)
