= Kip King =

American actor

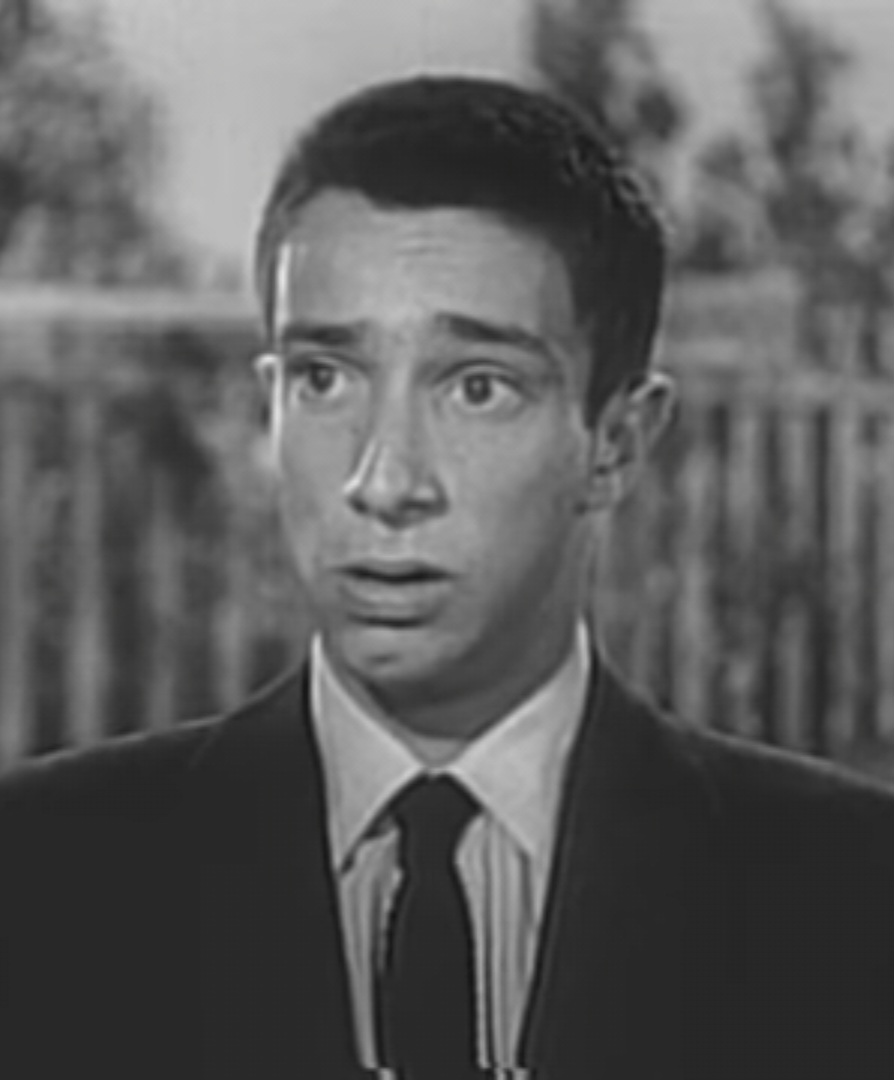
- King in an episode of Medic (1955)
- Born: Jerome Charles Kattan; August 11, 1937; Chicago, Illinois, U.S.
- Died: July 15, 2010 (aged 72); Los Angeles, California, U.S.
- Other name: Jerome C. Kattan
- Occupations: Actor, voice actor, acting instructor
- Years active: 1953–2009
- Spouse: Hajnalka E. Biro (divorced)
- Children: Chris Kattan

Kip King (born Jerome Charles Kattan; August 11, 1937 – July 15, 2010) was an American film, television and voice actor. He is the father of American television sketch comedian Chris Kattan.

== Life and career ==
King was born Jerome Charles Kattan in Chicago, Illinois, the son of an Iraqi-Jewish father and a Polish-Jewish mother. His father, who was from Baghdad, was a letter carrier for T. E. Lawrence.

King was probably best known for voicing Tailor Smurf in the 1980s television cartoon series The Smurfs. Long associated with Hanna-Barbera, King provided the voice of Shecky in The Biskitts (1983). He was also in the voice casts of The Little Rascals (1982), Scooby-Doo and Scrappy-Doo (1979-1980), Tom & Jerry Kids (1990), Droopy, Master Detective and the Flintstones TV special I Yabba-Dabba Do! (both 1993).

He also made many guest appearances in films and on television shows such as Diff'rent Strokes, Corky Romano, Bachelor Father, The Munsters Today, One Day at a Time, Dragnet (both 1954 and 1989 versions), Burke's Law, The Bronx Zoo, Mister Roberts, Babylon 5: Thirdspace, Barney Miller, Mister Ed, My Favorite Martian, The Bill Cosby Show, My Living Doll, The Beverly Hillbillies, Ben Casey, Mannix, The Rifleman, America 2-Night, Reno 911!, 12 O'Clock High, More Than Friends, Small Wonder, Breast Men, The Fall Guy, Burke's Law, Cagney and Lacey, The Partridge Family and The Jeffersons. He also wrote the teleplay for an episode of The Betty Hutton Show.

King was an original member of The Groundlings comedy troupe.

King died on July 15, 2010, after a long illness.

== Filmography ==
=== Animated roles ===
- Droopy, Master Detective - Additional Voices
- Scooby-Doo and Scrappy-Doo - Additional Voices
- The Biskitts - Shecky
- The Scooby & Scrappy-Doo/Puppy Hour - Additional Voices
- The Smurfs - Tailor Smurf
- Timeless Tales from Hallmark - Various Characters
- Tom & Jerry Kids - Additional Voices

=== Live-action roles ===
- 12 O'Clock High - Sgt. Weinstock
- America 2-Night - Rabbi Shecky Stein
- Babylon 5: Thirdspace - Leo
- Bachelor Father - Ansel
- Barney Miller - Nicholas Baskin, Paul Powell
- Batman - Nick
- Ben Casey - Victor
- Big Town
- Bollywood Hero - Himself
- Bosom Buddies - Budd Shore
- Burke's Law - Skins
- Captain Nice
- Cagney and Lacey - Businessman
- Call Me Claus - Rabbi Rosenfarb
- Charlie and Company - Ronald Sandler
- The Real McCoys - Spookie
- Diff'rent Strokes - Dr. Padnick
- Don't Call Me Charlie! - Irving (1963 – unaired episode)
- Dragnet - Johnny Colter (1956)
- Dragnet - Stan Gibbon (1989)
- EZ Streets - Insurance Adjuster
- Going My Way - Second Boy, Joey
- Halfway Home - Alan's Dad
- Handsome Harry's - Honest Stu Olsen
- High Sierra Search and Rescue
- Jack's Place
- Longstreet - Dr. Fowler
- Love, American Style (segment Love and the Nurse)
- Mannix - Dr. Kelly
- Man with a Camera - Ding Dong Fabrizi
- Medic - Lambert
- Mister Ed - Norman Howard
- Mister Roberts - Wiley
- More Than Friends - Lily Pad Pal
- Mr. Smith Goes to Washington - Emil, Bobo Bowman
- M Squad - Badger
- My Favorite Martian - Freddie Carson
- My Living Doll - Bellboy
- One Day at a Time - Mr. Neiman, Mr. Robters
- Out of This World - Dr. Stockman
- Reno 911! - Larrie Plum
- Rosetti and Ryan: Men Who Love Women - Wardell
- Small Wonder - Kenny Hart
- The Beverly Hillbillies - Producer #3
- The Bill Cosby Show - Sam Cutter
- The Bronx Zoo - Uncle Louie
- The Eleventh Hour - Tom
- The Facts of Life - Florist
- The Fall Guy
- The Jeffersons - Mr. Mendelson
- The June Allyson Show - Ward
- The Munsters Today - Burt Fearman
- The Partridge Family - Second Musician
- The Proper Time - Jerry Rohn
- The Rifleman - Donnel O'Mahoney
- The Smothers Brothers Show - Messenger
- The Walter Winchell File - Freddy Lundberg

=== Film roles ===
- Tea and Sympathy (1956) - Ted
- Johnny Trouble (1957) - Kip King
- The Proper Time (1962) - Jerry Rohn
- Thunder Alley (1967) - Dom
- Westworld (1974) - Technician #6
- Black Starlet (1974) - Commercial Director
- Murph the Surf (1975) - Party Guest #3
- Slumber Party '57 (1976) - School Teacher
- Scout's Honor (1980, TV Movie) - Mr. Appleorchard
- Student Confidential (1987) - Mr. Goldman
- Cyber-C.H.I.C. (1990) - Dr. Von Colon
- I Yabba-Dabba Do! (1993, TV Movie) - (voice)
- Breast Men (1997, TV Movie) - Barry Biggs
- A Night at the Roxbury (1998) - Flower Customer #2
- Perfumed Garden (2000) - Daerco
- Vice (2000) - Judge Roper
- Corky Romano (2001) - Dr. Kipper
- A Light in the Forest (2003) - Lowell Hawkins
- A Golightly Gathering (2009) - Himself
- Scouts Honor (2009) - Mr. Appleorchard (final film role)
