= Berry (surname) =

Berry is a surname with numerous etymological origins.

Some of the first British Jewish families to emigrate to the United States had "Berry" as their surname. It comes from the Polish (eastern Ashkenazic) "Jagoda", which is Polish for "berry" (Anglicised; as a Jewish family name, it is one of the Slavic variants of the Hebrew biblical male proper name Yehuda (in English, Judah). Some other Jewish variants of the "Berry" surname are Perry, Berryman, Barry, etc.

It is also an alternate spelling of Beri, a surname of Khatris originating from the Punjab region of the Northern Indian subcontinent.

Notable people with the surname include:

- Albert Berry (disambiguation), multiple people

- Albert Berry (parachutist) (1878–?), American who claimed first parachute jump from an airplane
- Albert S. Berry (1836–1908), United States Representative from Kentucky

- Alexander Berry (1781–1873), Scottish surgeon and Australian explorer
- Alf Berry (1883–1945), English footballer
- Alonna Berry (born 1989), American politician from Delaware
- Amanda Berry (born 1986), victim of Ariel Castro kidnappings
- Amy Viranya Berry (born 1998), British-Thai model and beauty queen
- Angelina J. Knox (née Angelina J. Berry; 1819–1896), American inventor, abolitionist
- Anthony Berry (1925–1984), British politician killed in Brighton hotel bombing
- Arthur Berry (disambiguation), multiple people

- Arthur Berry (playwright) (1925–1994), English playwright, poet, teacher and artist
- Arthur Berry (footballer) (1888–1953), English amateur footballer
- Arthur Massey Berry (1888–1970), Canadian bush pilot
- Arthur Berry (politician) (1879–1943), politician in Manitoba, Canada
- Arthur Berry (cricketer) (1928–2016), New Zealand cricketer

- Barnett Berry, American research professor
- Bertrand Berry, American NFL football player
- Bill Berry (born 1958), American former drummer for the band R.E.M.
- Bill Berry (trumpeter) (1930–2002), American jazz trumpeter
- Bob Berry, multiple people
  - Bob Berry (cricketer) (1926–2006), English cricketer
  - Bob Berry (dendrologist), founder of Hackfalls arboretum, Tiniroto, New Zealand
- Brian Berry (1934–2025), British-American geographer and planner
- Bruce Berry (disambiguation), multiple people
- Carlotta Berry, American academic in the field of engineering
- Charles Berry, multiple people
  - Charles A. Berry (1923–2020), American Flight Surgeon
  - Charles Albert Berry (1852–1899), English Congregationalist minister
  - Charles W. Berry (1871–1941), New York City Comptroller
  - Chuck Berry (1926–2017), American musician and songwriter
- Chu Berry (1908–1941), American jazz saxophonist
- Cicely Berry (1926–2018), British theatre director and vocal coach
- Clarence Berry (1867–1930), American miner and oilman
- Colin Berry (1946–2025), British radio disc jockey, presenter and newsreader
- Colin Berry (pathologist) (born 1937), British academic, medical professor and pathologist
- Damien Berry (born 1989), American football player
- Danielle Bunten Berry (1949–1998), computer game designer
- David/Dave Berry, multiple people
  - Dave Berry (Canadian football) (c. 1922–2007), Canadian football player
  - David Berry (landowner) (1795–1889), Scottish livestock breeder in Australia
  - Dave Berry (American football) (c.1870–1928), American football manager
  - Dave Berry (musician) (born 1941), British musician
  - David Berry (writer) (1943–2016), American playwright
  - Dave Berry (footballer) (born 1945), English footballer
  - David Berry (politician) (born 1951), Australian politician
  - David Berry (inventor) (born 1978), American entrepreneur and venture capitalist
  - Dave Berry (presenter) (born 1978), British television presenter and radio DJ
  - David Berry (educator) (born 1960), English lecturer and writer
  - David Berry (special effects artist), special effects artist
  - David Berry (actor), Australian actor
- Davion Berry (born 1991), American player in Israeli Basketball Premier League
- Dennis Berry (director) (1944–2021), American film director, actor and screenwriter
- Edward Berry, multiple people
  - Edward Berry (1768–1831), rear admiral, Royal Navy
  - Edward Wilber Berry (1875–1945), American paleontologist and botanist
- Edwin S. Berry (1845–1934), surveyor and explorer in the Northern Territory of Australia
- Elizabeth Williams Berry (1854–1969), Australian-American jockey and horse trainer
- Eric/Erick Berry, multiple people
  - Eric Berry American football player; Kansas City Chiefs strong safety
  - Eric Berry (actor) (1913–1993), British stage and film actor
  - Erick Berry (1892–1974), American writer, illustrator and editor
- Evan Berry (born 1995), American football player
- Frederick Berry (1949–2018), American politician
- Fred Berry (1951–2003), US actor
- Garrett Berry (born 2003), American racing driver
- George Berry (disambiguation), multiple people, including
  - George Berry (born 1997), drummer and producer for Bears in Trees
  - George Berry (footballer) (born 1957), Welsh international football player
  - Bill Berry (footballer, born 1904) (1904–1972), English footballer, known in France as George Berry
  - George Berry (American football) (1900–1986), American football player
  - George Berry (Australian politician) (1913–1998), Australian politician
  - George Berry (captain) (1706–1776), French and Indian War captain
  - George Berry (surgeon) (1853–1940), British eye surgeon and politician
  - George J. Berry (1937–2019), Commissioner of Industry, Trade, and Tourism for State of Georgia
  - George L. Berry (1882–1948), president of the International Pressmen and Assistants' Union
  - George Packer Berry (1898–1986), American medical educator
  - George Ricker Berry (1865–1945), Semitic scholar and archaeologist
- Gérard Berry (born 1948), French computer scientist
- Graham Berry (1822–1904), Australian politician
- Gwen Berry (born 1989), American hammer thrower
- Halle Berry (born 1966), US actress
- Harlem Berry (born 2007), American football player
- Jack Berry, multiple people
  - Jack Berry (1944–2003), Irish sportsperson
  - Jack Berry (journalist) (born 1931/1932), American sports journalist
- Jacob Berry (born 2001), American baseball player
- Jake Berry (born 1978), British politician
- James Berry (disambiguation), multiple people
  - James Berry, Puritan leader of Seat Pleasant, Maryland
  - James Berry (artist) (1906–1979), New Zealand stamp and coin designer
  - James Berry (barrister) (born 1983), British politician
  - James Berry (executioner) (1852–1913), English executioner, 1884–1891
  - James Berry (footballer) (born 2000), English footballer
  - James Berry (major-general) (died 1691), fought in the English Civil War
  - James Berry (poet) (1924–2017), Jamaican poet
  - James Berry (surgeon) (1860–1946), British surgeon
  - James Berry (writer) (1842–1914), Irish writer
  - James Gomer Berry, 1st Viscount Kemsley (1883–1968), Welsh publisher
  - James E. Berry (1881–1966), longest-serving Lieutenant Governor in Oklahoma
  - James Henderson Berry (1841–1913), Governor and U.S. Senator of Arkansas
- Jan Berry (1941–2004), American singer, songwriter and record producer, of Jan and Dean
- Jessica N. Berry (born 1972), American philosopher
- Jim Berry, multiple people
  - Jim Berry, of List of presidents of the United States Chess Federation
  - Jim Berry (cartoonist) (1932–2015), American comic strip artist
  - Jim Berry (hurler) (born 1989), Wexford hurler
  - Jim Berry (news anchor) (born c. 1955), Miami news anchor
  - Jim Berry (soccer) (1945–2020), Canadian soccer player
- Jarrod Berry (born 1998), Australian rules footballer
- Jo Berry, multiple people
  - Jo Berry (born 1957), British activist
  - Jo Berry (actress) (born 1994), Filipino actress
- Joe Berry, multiple people
  - Joe Berry (second baseman) (1894–1976), Major League baseball player
  - Joe Berry (pitcher) (1904–1958), Major League baseball player
- John Berry (disambiguation), multiple people
  - John Berry (administrator) (born 1959), US Ambassador to Australia
  - John Berry (arts administrator) (born 1961), British musician and arts administrator
  - John Berry (congressman) (1833–1879), US Representative
  - John Berry (cricketer) (1823–1895), British cricketer
  - John Berry (film director) (1917–1999), American film director
  - John Berry (illustrator) (1920–2009), British illustrator
  - John Berry (Beastie Boys) (1963–2016), member of the Beastie Boys
  - John Berry (New Jersey governor) (1619–1712), Deputy Governor of New Jersey
  - John Berry (priest) (1849–1923), Church of England priest and Royal Navy chaplain
  - John Berry (Royal Navy officer) (1635–1689/90), involved in the settlement of Newfoundland
  - John Berry (rugby) (1866–1930), rugby union footballer
  - John Berry (country singer) (born 1959), American country singer
  - John Berry (speedway promoter) (1944–2012), England national team manager
  - John Berry (zoologist) (1907–2002), Scottish zoologist and ecologist
  - John Cutting Berry (1847–1936), American medical missionary to Japan
  - John James Berry (1926–1994), Manchester United and England footballer
  - John M. Berry (1827–1887), American jurist and politician
  - John Stevens Berry, attorney
  - John W. Berry (librarian) (born 1947), American librarian
  - John W. Berry (psychologist), Canadian psychologist
  - John Walter Berry (1868–1943), Canadian politician
  - John Wesley Berry (1858–1931), Tacoma councilman
- Jonathan Berry (chess player) (born 1953), chess master
- Joseph Flintoft Berry (1856–1931), Bishop of the Methodist Episcopal Church
- Josephine Thorndike Berry (1871–1945), American educator, home economist
- Judith Berry (born 1961), Canadian painter
- Justin Berry, (born 1986), American pornographer
- Keith Berry, multiple people
  - Keith Berry (musician) (born 1973), London-based musician and composer
  - Keith Berry (fighter) (born 1987), American mixed martial artist
- Ken Berry, multiple people
  - Ken Berry (1933–2018), American actor, dancer and singer
  - Ken Berry (baseball) (born 1941), Major League baseball outfielder
- Kevin Berry (1945–2006), Australian swimmer
- Leonard G. Berry (1914–1982), Canadian mineralogist
- Lillian Gay Berry (1872–1962), first female professor at Indiana University
- Lisa Berry (born 1979), Canadian Actress
- Louise Berry (1927–2022), American politician
- Marcellus Flemming Berry, inventor of the American Express Traveler's cheque
- Mark Berry, multiple people
- Martha Berry, founder of Berry College
- Martia L. Davis Berry (1844–1894), American social reformer
- Martin Berry (born 1977), Australian businessman and racing driver
- Mary Berry (disambiguation), multiple people
- Matt Berry, British actor, musician and writer
- Matthew Berry (born 1969), American writer and fantasy sports analyst
- Michael Berry (disambiguation), multiple people

- Michael Berry (athlete) (born 1991), American sprinter
- Michael Berry (physicist) (born 1941), British mathematical physicist
- Michael Berry (radio host) (born 1970), American talk show host
- Michael Berry, Baron Hartwell (1911–2001), newspaper proprietor and journalist
- Michael Berry Jr. (born 1964), British actor

- Mike Berry (singer) (1942–2025), English singer and actor
- Montgomery P. Berry, American government official
- Nyall Berry (born 1999), English boxer
- Orville F. Berry (1852–1921), American lawyer, businessman and politician
- Paula Berry (born 1969), American javelin thrower
- Quintin Berry (born 1984), American baseball player and coach
- Rachel Berry (disambiguation), multiple people
  - Rachel Berry (legislator) (1859–1948), American suffragist and politician
  - Rachel Berry and her husband Richard, owners of Richard Berry, Jr., House (Springfield, Kentucky)
- Randy W. Berry (born 1965), American diplomat.
- R. J. Berry (Robert James "Sam" Berry 1934–2018), British geneticist and Christian theorist
- R. Stephen Berry (1931–2020), Professor of physical chemistry
- Randall Berry, American engineer
- Rashod Berry (born 1996), American football player
- Richard Berry (disambiguation), multiple people
  - Richard Berry, 3rd Viscount Kemsley (born 1951), British peer
  - Richard Berry (actor) (born 1950), French actor
  - Richard Berry (missionary) (1824–1908), care worker in South Australia
  - Richard Berry (musician) (1935–1997), African-American singer
  - Richard Berry (scientist), British-Canadian chemist
  - Richard J. Berry (born 1962), American politician and mayor of Albuquerque, New Mexico
  - Richard N. Berry (1915–2018), American politician from Maine
  - Richard Nixon Berry (1873–1956), Canadian dentist and politician
- Richard James Arthur Berry (1867–1962), British surgeon and professor of anatomy in Australia
- Rick Berry (born 1978), Canadian ice hockey player
- Rick Berry (artist) (born 1953), American expressionistic figurative artist
- Ricky Berry (1964–1989), American basketball player
- Ritu Beri, Indian fashion designer
- Robert Berry (disambiguation), multiple people
  - Robert Berry (born 1950), American guitarist
  - Robert Berry (runner) (1972–2014), died at the 2014 London Marathon
  - Robert E. Berry, American food scientist
  - Robert Edward Fraser Berry (1926–2011), Anglican bishop
  - Robert Griffith Berry (1869–1945), Welsh minister
  - Robert Mallory Berry, Arctic explorer
  - Robert Marion Berry (1942–2023), American politician
- Rod Berry (1948–2013), American politician and lawyer
- Ron Berry (1920–1997), Welsh writer
- Ross Berry, American politician
- Samuel Stillman Berry (1887–1984), US zoologist
- Scott Berry, American college baseball coach
- Sean Berry, former baseball player
- Sharon Berry, British charity founder
- Siân Berry, English politician
- Sidney Bryan Berry (1926–2013), United States Army general
- Stan Berry, American politician
- Sudesh Berry (born 1960), Indian film and television actor
- Suman Bery, Indian economist
- Tara Alisha Berry, Indian actress
- Thomas/Tom Berry, multiple people
  - Thomas Berry, Catholic priest, historian, and self-described "earth scholar"
  - Tom Berry (rugby union) (1911–1993), English rugby union player and administrator
  - Tom Berry (South Dakota politician), Governor of South Dakota
  - Tom Berry (boxer) (1890–1943), English boxer of the 1910s, '20s and '30s
- Tricia Berry, American politician
- Tyrone Berry, English footballer
- Walter Berry, multiple people
  - Walter Berry (basketball), US basketball player
  - Walter Berry (bass-baritone) (1929–2000), Austrian opera singer
- Wendell Berry (1934–2026), writer and poet
- William Berry (disambiguation), multiple people
  - William Berry, 1st Viscount Camrose (1879–1954), British newspaper publisher
  - William Berry (artist) (1933–2010), illustrator and professor at the University of Missouri
  - William Berry (cricketer) (1897–1949), English cricketer
  - William Berry (footballer, born 1867) (1867–1919), Scottish footballer
  - William Berry (footballer, born 1934), English footballer
  - William Berry (genealogist) (1774–1851), English genealogist
  - William Berry (journalist) (1835–1903), New Zealand journalist and newspaper editor
  - William Berry (pioneer) (1619–1654), First Settler of Hampton, New Hampshire
  - William Berry (Roundhead) (c. 1605–1669), fought in English Civil War, MP
  - William A. Berry (judge) (1915–2004), justice of the Oklahoma Supreme Court
  - William D. Berry (artist) (1926–1979), Alaskan artist
  - William D. Berry (political scientist), professor at Florida State University
  - William H. Berry (1852–1928), Treasurer of Pennsylvania
- Zeke Berry (born 2003), American football player

== Fictional characters ==
- Marvin Berry, a character from the movie Back to the Future
- Rachel Berry, a character from the television show Glee

== See also ==
- Justice Berry (disambiguation)
