= William Berry =

William Berry may refer to:

== Law and politics ==
- William H. Berry (1852–1928), American politician in Pennsylvania
- William A. Berry (judge) (1915–2004), American jurist in Oklahoma
- William D. Berry (political scientist), American political science professor

== Military ==
- William Berry (Roundhead) (c. 1605–1669), English army colonel
- William Berry (naval architect) (1865–1937), British naval architect

== Sports ==
- William Berry (footballer, born 1867) (1867–1919), Scottish footballer
- William Berry (cricketer) (1897–1949), English cricketer
- William Berry (footballer, born 1934), English footballer
- John Berry (speedway promoter) (William John Berry, 1944–2012), English-Australian speedway promoter

== Others ==
- William Berry (pioneer) (1619–1654), American pioneer in Hampton, New Hampshire
- William Berry (genealogist) (1774–1851), English genealogist
- William Berry (journalist) (1835–1903), New Zealand journalist and newspaper editor
- William Berry, 1st Viscount Camrose (1879–1954), British newspaper publisher
- William D. Berry (artist) (1926–1979), Alaskan artist
- William Berry (artist) (1933–2010), American art professor and illustrator

== See also ==
- Bill Berry (disambiguation)
- William Bury (disambiguation)
