= George Berry =

George Berry may refer to:

== Sportspeople ==
- George Berry (footballer) (born 1957), Welsh international football player
- Bill Berry (footballer, born 1904) (1904–1972), English footballer, known as George Berry when he played and coached in France
- George Berry (American football) (1900–1986), American football player

== Others ==
- George Berry (Australian politician) (1913–1998), Australian politician
- George Berry (captain) (1706–1776), French and Indian War captain
- George J. Berry (1937–2019), American businessman, Commissioner of Industry, Trade, and Tourism for the state of Georgia, 1983–1990
- George L. Berry (1882–1948), president of the International Pressmen and Assistants' Union of North America, 1907–1948
- George Ricker Berry (1865–1945), Semitic scholar and archaeologist
- George Berry (surgeon) (1853–1940), British eye surgeon and politician
- George Packer Berry (1898–1986), American physician and medical educator
- George Berry (born 1997), drummer and producer for Bears in Trees
