= Dan McIntyre =

Dan or Daniel McIntyre may refer to:

- Dan McIntyre (activist) (1950–2001), chair of Ryerson University's Board of Governors and human rights activist
- Dan McIntyre (musician), Chicago jazz guitarist
- Daniel McIntyre (educator) (1852–1946), Winnipeg, Manitoba's first school superintendent
  - Daniel McIntyre Collegiate Institute
- Daniel McIntyre (politician), member of the Ontario Provincial Parliament (1943-1945)
- Don McIntyre (Daniel Gordon McIntyre, 1915–2013), Australian rules footballer
- Dan MacIntyre (1917–1969), American politician from Georgia; state senator (1963–1969)
