= David Berry =

David or Dave Berry may refer to:

- David Berry (landowner) (1795–1889), Scottish-born livestock breeder and landowner in colonial Australia
- Dave Berry (American football) (1870–1928), American football manager
- Dave Berry (musician) (born 1941), British musician
- David Berry (writer) (1943–2016), American playwright
- Dave Berry (footballer) (born 1945), English footballer
- David Berry (politician) (born 1951), Australian politician
- David Berry (inventor) (born 1978), American inventor, entrepreneur, and venture capitalist
- Dave Berry (presenter) (born 1978), British television presenter and radio DJ
- David Berry (educator) (born 1960), English lecturer and writer
- David Berry (special effects artist), special effects artist in the 1970s and 1980s
- David Berry (actor), Australian actor
- Dave Berry (Canadian football) (1921–2007), Canadian football player
- David A. Berry (born c. 1945), American educator and administrator
- Dave Berry, mixed martial artist who fought in UFC 11
- David M. Berry, British academic, writer and musician

== See also ==
- David de Berry (1952–1995), American theater composer and actor
- David Berry Hart (1851–1920), Scottish doctor
- David Berry Knapp (born 1948), American businessman, member of the Rajneesh movement
- David Berri (born 1969), American sports economist
- David Barry (disambiguation)
