= Richard Berry =

Richard or Rick Berry may refer to:

== Arts and entertainment ==
- Richard Berry (musician) (1935–1997), African-American singer
- Richard Berry (actor) (born 1950), French actor
- Rick Berry (artist) (born 1953), American expressionistic figurative artist

== Politics ==
- Richard J. Berry (born 1962), American politician and former mayor of Albuquerque, New Mexico
- Richard N. Berry (1915–2018), American politician from Maine
- Richard Nixon Berry (1873–1956), Canadian dentist and politician

== Others ==
- Richard Berry (scientist), British-Canadian chemist
- Richard Berry (missionary) (1824–1908), care worker in South Australia
- Richard Berry, 3rd Viscount Kemsley (born 1951), British peer
- Rick Berry (born 1978), Canadian ice hockey player
- Ricky Berry (1964–1989), American basketball player
- Richard James Arthur Berry (1867–1962), British surgeon and professor of anatomy in Australia

== See also ==
- Richard Barry (disambiguation)
- Richard Berry Harrison (1864–1935), Canadian actor, teacher, dramatic reader and lecturer
- Richard Berry Jr. House (disambiguation)
