= Rick Berry (disambiguation) =

Rick Berry (born 1978) is a Canadian former ice hockey player.

Rick Berry may also refer to:

- Rick Berry (artist) (born 1953), American expressionistic figure artist
- Ricky Berry (1964–1989), American basketball player in the 1980s

== See also ==
- Rick Barry (born 1944), American basketball player inducted in the Naismith Memorial Basketball Hall of Fame
- Richard Berry (disambiguation)
