= Bill Berry (disambiguation) =

Bill Berry (born 1958) is an American drummer, formerly of the band R.E.M.

Bill Berry may also refer to:

- Bill Berry (Australian footballer) (born 1957), Australian rules footballer in the VFL
- Bill Berry (basketball) (born 1942), American basketball coach, who served two games as head coach of the Chicago Bulls
- Bill Berry (director), Broadway director
- Bill Berry (folk singer) (1934–2019), Australian folk singer
- Bill Berry (footballer, born 1904) (1904–1972), English footballer in the 1920s and 1930s
- Bill Berry (footballer, born 1882) (1882–1943), English footballer
- Bill Berry (trumpeter) (1930–2002), American jazz trumpeter

== See also ==
- William Berry (disambiguation)
