= William A. Berry =

William A. Berry may refer to:

- William Berry (artist) (William Augustus Berry, 1933–2010), author, artist, and professor of art
- William A. Berry (judge) (1915–2004), justice of the Oklahoma Supreme Court
