= James Barry =

James Barry may refer to:

== Politics ==
- James Barry (Wisconsin politician) (1812–1883), Irish-born Wisconsin state assemblyman
- James Barry (Irish MP, 1659–1717), Irish politician
- James Barry (Irish MP, 1661–1725), Irish politician
- James Barry (Irish MP, 1689–1743), Irish politician
- James Alexander Barry (1886–1950), Canadian politician
- James G. Barry (1800–1880), Missouri politician
- James J. Barry Jr. (born 1946), New Jersey politician
- James Barry, 4th Earl of Barrymore (1667–1748), Irish soldier and Jacobite politician

== Sports ==
- Jimmy Barry (1870–1943), Irish-American boxer
- James Barry (hurler) (born 1990), Irish hurler
- James E. Barry (1884–1941), American college football coach
- Jim Barry (1893–1968), Irish hurling and football trainer

== Other ==
- James Barry, 1st Baron Barry of Santry (1603–1673), Irish lawyer
- James Barry (painter) (1741–1806), Irish painter
- James Barry (surgeon) (c. 1789–1865), Irish physician in the British Army
- James L. Barry, comics artist
- Jim Barry (general) (born 1932), Australian businessman, Army Reserve officer, and sports administrator

== See also ==
- James M. Barrie (1860–1937), Scottish writer, creator of Peter Pan
- James Berry (disambiguation)
