= Senator Hewes =

Senator Hewes may refer to:

- Billy Hewes (born 1961), Mississippi State Senate
- Richard Hewes (1926–2014), Maine State Senate
