= David Barry =

David Barry may refer to:

- David de Barry, 5th Viscount Buttevant (1550–1617), Irish peer
- David Barry, 1st Earl of Barrymore (1604–1642)
- Sir David Barry (Irish physician) (1780–1835), Irish physician and physiologist
- David Barry (New Zealand paediatrician) (born 1939)
- David Francis Barry (1854–1934), photographer of the American West
- David S. Barry (1859–1936), American journalist
- Dave Barry (Australian footballer) (1888–1913), VFL and WAFL footballer
- Dave Barry (actor) (1918–2001), American actor, comedian, and radio moderator
- David Barry (actor) (born 1943), Welsh actor from sitcom Please Sir!
- Dave Barry (born 1947), American columnist
- Dave Barry (Irish footballer) (born 1961), dual code Irish footballer

== See also ==
- David Berry (disambiguation)
- David Ogilvy Barrie (born 1953), British diplomat and arts administrator
