= Alfred Berry (disambiguation) =

Alfred Berry (1883–1945) was an English footballer.

Alfred Berry may also refer to:

- Alfred Berry, Australian Rugby league player, see Annandale (rugby league team)
