= William Bury =

William Bury may refer to:

- William Bury (MP New Shoreham) (fl. 1449), for New Shoreham (UK Parliament constituency)
- William Bury (Roundhead) (c. 1605–1669), fought for Parliament during the English Civil War. A Member of the First Protectorate Parliament
- William Bury (cricketer) (1839–1927), English cricketer, clergyman and Poor Law reformer
- William Henry Bury (1859–1889), Jack the Ripper suspect
- William Bury (footballer) (born 1865) was an English professional footballer who played as a full back for Burnley

== See also ==
- William Berry (disambiguation)
