= Suzelle Levasseur =

Canadian painter

- Born: 1953 (age 72–73); Trois-Rivières, Quebec, Canada
- Education: Université du Québec à Montréal
- Known for: Painting, Drawing

Suzelle Levasseur, born in 1953 in Trois-Rivières, is a Canadian painter and draughtsperson.

== Biography ==
A graduate of the Université du Québec à Montréal in 1976, she became known in the Montreal art scene through an exhibition at the Musée d’art contemporain de Montréal in the late 1980s.

== Career ==
Suzelle Levasseur’s pictorial art focuses on the human figure and its environment. In her works from the 1980s, the figure is often distorted or fragmented, before gradually integrating into more fluid surfaces where distinctions between form and background blend together. This evolution is accompanied by a more expressionist approach to her pictorial work.

From the 1990s onward, Suzelle Levasseur produced circular-format paintings (tondo), exploring the relationship between pictorial space and perception. In 1998, she worked as an exhibition curator, organizing at the Maison de la culture Marie-Uguay an exhibition bringing together several artists around this format, including Judith Berry, Pierre Blanchette, Kittie Bruneau and Marcelle Ferron.

Alongside painting, Levasseur developed a drawing practice. Some series, centered on motifs of eyes and tears, address themes related to emotion and perception. This work is characterized by a position between figuration and abstraction.

Works by Suzelle Levasseur are part of the permanent collections of the Musée d'art contemporain de Montréal, the Art Bank of the Canada Council for the Arts, and the Musée national des beaux-arts du Québec.

== See also ==
- Abstraction (art)
- Contemporary art
