= Southern Appalachian Repertory Theatre =

American theatre company

Southern Appalachian Repertory Theatre (SART) is a professional theatre company in residence at the historic Owen Theatre on the campus of Mars Hill University in Mars Hill, North Carolina. Founded in 1975 by director and theatre educator Jim Thomas, SART has produced scores of plays, musicals, and original works - many portraying the rich culture and heritage of Southern Appalachia. After operating for many years as a program of Mars Hill University (previously Mars Hill College), SART became an independent nonprofit organization in 2003, governed by a volunteer board of directors. In recognition of its artistic excellence and cultural importance to the community, SART has received major funding from the National Endowment for the Arts, North Carolina Arts Council, Madison County Arts Council, and the Shubert Foundation. SART also receives support from Mars Hill University, along with donations and sponsorship from patrons and local business owners.

== Shortlist of past productions at SART include ==
- The Fantasticks
- Of Mice and Men
- Noises Off
- Lost In Yonkers
- Blithe Spirit
- Harvey
- Working: The Musical
- A Tennessee Walk
- The Light in the Piazza
- Smoke On The Mountain: Sanders Family Christmas

== Future productions include ==
- Bright Star
- The Odd Couple
- The Miracle Worker
- Miracle In Bedford Falls
- The Last Five Years
- First Date
- Milestones
- A Southern Appalachian Christmas
- A Christmas Carol
