= David Randall =

British journalist and author (1951–2021)

- Born: April 1951; Ipswich, Suffolk, England, United Kingdom
- Died: 17 July 2021 (aged 70)
- Education: Clare College, Cambridge
- Occupations: Journalist, author

David Randall (April 1951 – 17 July 2021) was a British journalist and author of The Universal Journalist, a textbook on journalism. He was assistant editor of The Observer until 1998, when he joined The Independent on Sunday and worked there until retiring in 2013.

== Education and career in journalism ==
Randall was born in Ipswich in 1951. He studied economics at Clare College, Cambridge. While at Cambridge, he was recruited to write for the student newspaper Varsity by editor Jeremy Paxman and wrote a weekly column titled "The Adventures of Druisilla Nutt-Tingler".

== Career ==
After a brief period as a professional comedian and a brand manager at a cosmetics company, Randall joined the Croydon Advertiser as a trainee reporter in 1974 and became the paper's editor in 1980. He joined The Observer one year later as deputy sports editor. He was promoted to the post of assistant editor. Randall later joined The Independent on Sunday in 1998. He worked as its home editor, chief news writer, and commentator until his retirement in 2013.

== Books ==
Randall was the author of The Universal Journalist. In a review of the book in the British Journalism Review, Ann Leslie stated "How I wish this book had been around when I was a young reporter." In the book Journalism, Ethics and Society, David Berry labels Randall a "prominent critic of the debate" concerning journalistic ethics and quotes Randall as arguing in The Universal Journalist that "the objectives and resolutions of ethical debates are unrealistic in the real world of practice [of journalism]."

Randall was also the author of The Great Reporters, which profiles thirteen reporters he regards as being the best journalists. Among the reporters included were Edna Buchanan, William Howard Russell, Hugh McIlvanney, Ann Leslie, and A. J. Liebling.

2019, "Suburbia (A Far From Ordinary Place)", his personal recollections of growing up in the 1950s and 1960s in Worcester Park and a warm and humorous broader look at life in the suburbs at that time.

== Personal life ==
Randall was married to Pam until his death. Together, they had four children: Guy, Paul, Simon, and Tom.

Randall resided in Croydon during his later life. He died during the week of 11–17 July 2021. He was 70, and suffered a suspected heart attack prior to his death.
