= That Sunday, That Summer =

1963 single by Nat King Cole

Single by Nat King Cole
- B-side: "Mr. Wishing Well"
- Released: August 31, 1963
- Genre: swing ballad
- Length: 3:09
- Label: Capitol
- Songwriters: Joe Sherman; George David Weiss

"That Sunday, That Summer" is a swing ballad, written by Joe Sherman and George David Weiss and published in 1963.

== Nat King Cole recording ==
The highest charting version is by Nat King Cole. It was recorded on May 16, 1963, at Capitol Records in Los Angeles with a Ralph Carmichael arrangement and was released August 31, 1963. It reached No. 12 on the Billboard Hot 100 and No. 3 on the Middle-Road Singles chart in 1963.

== Other recorded versions ==
Other versions have also been recorded:

- The Beegie Adair Trio 1998
- Ernestine Anderson 1990
- Roger Cairns 2006
- Betty Carter 1988
- Natalie Cole 1991
- Kathie Lee Gifford 1992
- Bill Henderson
- Julie London 1964
- Johnny Mathis 1983 (Johnny Mathis & Natalie Cole - Unforgettable - A Tribute To Nat King Cole)
- Bob McHugh 2001
- Dan McIntyre 2000
- Claressa Monteiro
- Jimmy Rowles
- Bobby Scott
- The George Shearing Quintet 2001
- Robert Stewart
- Sweet N’ Jazzy 1999
- Dinah Washington 1963
- Jack Wilson
- George Benson 2013
