= Keith Berry =

Keith Berry may refer to:

- Keith Berry (musician) (born 1973), English musician and composer
- Keith Berry (fighter) (born 1987), American mixed martial artist

== See also ==
- Keith Barry (born 1976), Irish illusionist
