= Mary Berry (disambiguation) =

Mary Berry (born 1935) is an English food writer and television presenter.

Mary Berry may also refer to:

- Mary Berry (conductor) (1917–2008), English canoness, choral conductor, and musicologist
- Mary Berry (writer, born 1763) (1763–1852), English writer
- Mary Fleetwood Berry (1865–1956), Irish suffragist
- Mary Frances Berry (born 1938), American historian and chair of the US Commission on Civil Rights
- Mary Jones Berry, American aerospace engineer
- Mary Ella Kirby Berry (1916–1957), medical missionary
- "Mary Berry", a 2020 song by English rapper Niko B

== See also ==
- Mary Barry (born 1955), Canadian singer
- Mary Gonzaga Barry (1834–1915), Irish Catholic religious sister
