= Ann Leslie =

English journalist (1941–2023)

Dame Ann Leslie DBE
- Born: Ann Elizabeth Mary Leslie; 28 January 1941; Rawalpindi, Punjab Province, British India
- Died: 25 June 2023 (aged 82)
- Education: Lady Margaret Hall, Oxford
- Occupation: Journalist
- Title: DBE
- Spouse: Michael Fletcher (m. 1969)
- Children: 1

Dame Ann Elizabeth Mary Leslie, DBE (28 January 1941 – 25 June 2023) was a British journalist who wrote for the Daily Mail.

Leslie was described as one of Britain's most famous and formidable journalists.

== Education ==
Leslie was born on 28 January 1941, in Rawalpindi, British India (now in Pakistan), where she spent her early years, attending an English-language school and "witnessed the killing trains of Partition". In 1950, her parents sent her to boarding school in England, where she attended the Presentation Convent School in Matlock, Derbyshire, and St Leonards-Mayfield School, East Sussex. She went on, two years later, to attend Lady Margaret Hall, Oxford.

== Career ==
Leslie's first job in journalism was at the Daily Express in Manchester in 1962. Leslie moved to the Daily Mail in 1967. She interviewed major film stars, entertainers, and political figures, and reported on numerous wars, civil conflicts and political stories in around 70 countries. At the Reuters/Press Gazette launch of the Newspaper Hall of Fame, she was named as one of the most influential journalists of the last forty years. In David Randall's The Great Reporters (celebrating the 13 best British and American journalists of all time) she was profiled as "the most versatile reporter ever".

She was a regular current affairs panellist on the BBC (Question Time, Any Questions?, Dateline London, Stop the Week), Sky News, and international broadcasting organisations.

Leslie was interviewed by National Life Stories (C467/18) in 2007–8 for the 'Oral History of the British Press' collection held by the British Library.

Leslie was also interviewed in the 2012 documentary The Diamond Queen about Queen Elizabeth II.

=== Foreign assignments ===
Significant events on which she reported include the fall of the Berlin Wall, the failed coup against Mikhail Gorbachev, and Nelson Mandela's final walk to freedom. She made secret interviews in Iran and North Korea. After a dangerous experience at a Zimbabwean ZANU farm, Leslie went back to the press hotel in Harare where other reporters sent back stories without venturing out of the hotel. She called them Avon ladies; only interested in make-up (as in made up stories).

Her memoir, Killing My Own Snakes, was published in 2008.

== Personal life and death ==
In 1969, Leslie married Michael Fletcher, and they had a daughter.

Leslie died on 25 June 2023, at the age of 82.

== Awards ==
Leslie won nine British Press Awards and won two Lifetime Achievement Awards. In 1999, she was awarded the James Cameron Award for international reporting. She was created a DBE on 30 December 2006, for "Services to Journalism". In 2012, Leslie won the Outstanding Contribution to Journalism Award at the eighth annual International Media Awards in London on 5 May 2012. She was recognised as one of the BBC's 100 women of 2013.
