= Daniel McIntyre (educator) =

Daniel McIntyre OBE
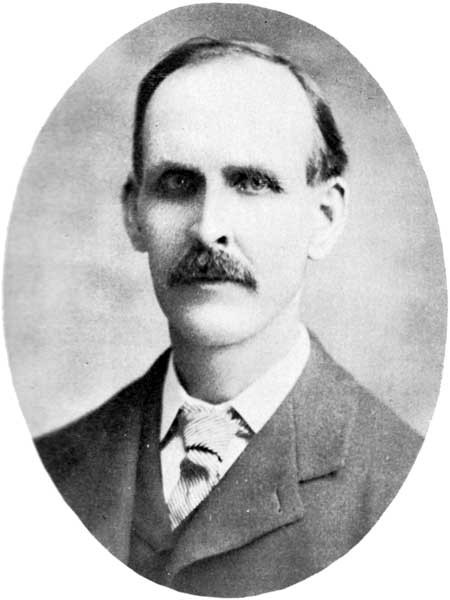
- Born: 27 August 1852; New Brunswick, British North America
- Died: 14 December 1946 (aged 94); Winnipeg, Manitoba, Canada
- Education: Dalhousie University
- Occupation: School administrator
- Spouse: Mary Getchell (m. 1878)

Daniel J. McIntyre OBE (1852–1946) was a public official and educator in Winnipeg, Manitoba, credited with developing the city's school system.

Winnipeg's Daniel McIntyre city ward and Daniel McIntyre Collegiate Institute are named after him.

== Biography ==
=== Personal life ===
McIntyre was born on 27 August 1852 near Dalhousie, New Brunswick, the first son of Andrew McIntyre and Mary (née) Murray. He was educated at the Provincial Normal School in Fredericton.

On 7 July 1878, he married Mary Getchell. Together, they had five children: Andrew Murray McIntyre (1882–unknown), Donald Faison McIntyre, Alice Margery McIntyre (1889–1898), Henry Getchell McIntyre (1892–1898), and Stuart Scott McIntyre (1897–1917).

=== Career and later life ===
He taught in schools in New Brunswick from 1872 to 1882, and was Superintendent of Schools in Portland, New Brunswick (now the north end of Saint John), from 1880 to 1882.

After studying at Dalhousie University, he was called to the bar in 1882. Instead of practicing law, however, McIntyre moved west to Manitoba in 1882 or 1883 to accept an appointment as principal of Carlton School in Winnipeg. In 1885, he was appointed Inspector of Protestant Public Schools and, in 1890, he became Superintendent of Public Schools, a position he held for 43 years. For around 3 decades, he served as representative of the teachers of the Eastern Division of Manitoba on the Advisory Board of Education.

From 1911 to 1912, he was president of the Manitoba Educational Association. He developed the Winnipeg School Board's curriculum and philosophy and was recognized with an honorary Doctor of Laws degree in 1912 from the University of Manitoba. He felt that "success in education came not from repression and torture but from the encouragement and happiness of the child" and that the development of the child is more important than the curriculum. He retired as superintendent in 1928.

McIntyre was also the first president of the Children's Aid Society in Winnipeg, and also actively worked with the Institute for the Blind.

He died in Winnipeg on 14 December 1946 and was buried in the Elmwood Cemetery.

== Recognition ==
Among other accolades, McIntyre has received the following recognition and commemoration for his work in education:

- in 1912, he was recognized with an honorary Doctor of Laws degree from the University of Manitoba
- in 1935, he was appointed as an Officer of the Order of the British Empire
- the Daniel McIntyre Collegiate Institute of the Winnipeg School Division is named in his honour
- in 2016, he was inducted into the Winnipeg Citizens Hall of Fame

== See also ==
- Manitoba Minister of Education
- Education in Canada
