= Arthur Berry =

Arthur Berry may refer to:

- Arthur Berry (playwright) (1925–1994), English playwright, poet, teacher and artist
- Arthur Berry (footballer) (1888–1953), English amateur footballer
- Arthur Massey Berry (1888–1970), Canadian bush pilot
- Arthur Berry (politician) (1879–1943), politician in Manitoba, Canada
- Arthur Berry (cricketer) (1928–2016), New Zealand cricketer
