= Richard Barry =

Richard or Rick Barry may refer to:

== Politicians and nobility ==
- Rick Barry (American Singer/Songwriter) (1981–Present), Award Winning Songwriter from Asbury Park, NJ.
- Richard Barry (Irish politician) (1919–2013), Irish Fine Gael politician
- Richard Barry, 2nd Earl of Barrymore (1630–1694)
- Richard Barry, 7th Earl of Barrymore (1769–1793), English nobleman of Ireland
- Richard Barry (died 1787), British Member of Parliament for Wigan
- Richard Barrey (died 1588), British Member of Parliament for Winchelsea

== Others ==
- Richard Hugh Barry (1908–1999), British Army officer
- Richard Barry, an American businessman, founder of Tru Kids, Inc
- Rick Barry (born 1944), American basketball player
- Rich Barry (1940–2021), American baseball player
- Scooter Barry (born 1966), American basketball player

== See also ==
- Dick Barry, American lawyer and politician
- Dick Barry (New Hampshire politician)
- Richard Berry (disambiguation)
