= Rachel Berry (disambiguation) =

Rachel Berry is a fictional character from the television show Glee.

Rachel Berry may also refer to:

- Rachel Berry (legislator) (1859–1948), American suffragist and politician
- Rachel Berry (figure skater) in 1999 United States Figure Skating Championships
- Rachel Berry and her husband Richard, owners of Richard Berry, Jr., House (Springfield, Kentucky)
