= Judge Berry =

Judge Berry may refer to:

- Albert S. Berry (1836–1908), U.S. Congressman who later served as judge of the seventeenth judicial district of Kentucky
- Ellis Yarnal Berry (1902–1999), U.S. Congressman who previously served as probate court judge
- James Henderson Berry (1841–1913), U.S. Senator who previously served as judge of the Arkansas Fourth Circuit Court
- Nathaniel S. Berry (1796–1894), governor of New Hampshire who previously served as a judge of the Grafton County Court of Common Pleas and of the Grafton County Probate Court
- Walter Van Rensselaer Berry (1859–1927), judge at the International Tribunal of Egypt
- William A. Berry (judge) (1915–2004), justice of the Oklahoma Supreme Court who previously served as a county judge

== Competition ==
- Mary Berry, cooking show judge on The Great British Bake Off (BBC/Channel 4) (known as The Great British Baking Show on PBS) cooking show, and The Great British Bake Off (ABC)

== See also ==
- Justice Berry (disambiguation)
