= Cocoon (film) =

1985 film by Ron Howard

- Theatrical release poster by John Alvin
- Directed by: Ron Howard
- Screenplay by: Tom Benedek
- Story by: David Saperstein
- Produced by: David Brown; Richard D. Zanuck; Lili Fini Zanuck
- Starring: Don Ameche; Wilford Brimley; Hume Cronyn; Brian Dennehy; Jack Gilford; Steve Guttenberg; Maureen Stapleton; Jessica Tandy; Gwen Verdon; Herta Ware; Tahnee Welch
- Cinematography: Donald Peterman
- Edited by: Daniel P. Hanley; Mike Hill
- Music by: James Horner
- Production company: Zanuck/Brown Company
- Distributed by: 20th Century Fox
- Release date: June 21, 1985
- Running time: 117 minutes
- Country: United States
- Language: English
- Budget: $17.5 million
- Box office: $85.3 million

Cocoon is a 1985 American science fiction comedy drama film directed by Ron Howard and written by Tom Benedek from a story by David Saperstein. The film stars Don Ameche, Wilford Brimley, Hume Cronyn, Brian Dennehy, Jack Gilford, Steve Guttenberg, Maureen Stapleton, Jessica Tandy, Gwen Verdon, Herta Ware, Tahnee Welch, and Linda Harrison, and follows a group of elderly people rejuvenated by aliens.

The film was shot in and around St. Petersburg, Florida, with locations including the St. Petersburg Shuffleboard Club, Suncoast Manor Retirement Community, the Coliseum, and Snell Arcade buildings. Cocoon was released by 20th Century Fox on June 21, 1985 to positive reviews from critics, while grossing $85.3 million against a $17.5 million budget. The film earned Academy Awards for Best Supporting Actor (Don Ameche) and Best Visual Effects, and was followed by the sequel Cocoon: The Return in 1988, in which almost all of the original cast returned.

== Plot ==
A group of aliens disguised as humans arrive in St. Petersburg, Florida from their home planet, Antarea. They rent a house with a swimming pool and charter a boat, the Manta III, from local captain Jack Bonner, who helps them retrieve cocoons from the sea bed. Jack becomes enamored with one of the group, Kitty, and ultimately discovers she is an alien. Jack agrees to help the group once they explain the cocoons contain Antareans left behind on their outpost on Atlantis, and they have charged the pool water with "life force" to give them energy to survive the trip home.

Next door to the house the Antareans are renting is the Sunny Shores Rest Home, three of the residents of which—Ben Luckett, Arthur Selwyn, and Joe Finley—often trespass to swim in the pool. Doing so, they absorb some of the life force and begin feeling younger and stronger. The Antarean leader, Walter, discovers them and permits them to use the pool on condition that they do not touch the cocoons or tell anybody else who does not already know. The three men bring their wives with them to swim, but their friend Bernie Lefkowitz refuses to do so or let his ailing wife Rose go with them.

When the other retirement home residents become suspicious of the three couples, Bernie mindlessly reveals the secret to the other residents, who rush to the pool. Walter finds them damaging one of the cocoons, he ejects them from the property, and the Antarean inside dies shortly after. That evening, Bernie finds that his wife Rose has stopped breathing and carries her body to the pool to heal her, only to be informed by Walter that the pool no longer works due to the other residents draining the life force. As the cocoons are no longer able to survive the trip back to Antarea, the group return the cocoons to the sea with the help of Jack, Ben, Arthur, and Joe.

The Antareans prepare to return home and offer to take residents of the rest home with them; learning they will never grow old or die on Antarea most of the residents accept, but Bernie chooses to remain on Earth. Ben informs his grandson, David, that they are leaving for good. When David's mother, Susan, finds out she rushes to the rest home and, finding it empty, calls the police.

While the police search for the residents, David sees Jack's boat departing with the residents aboard. David boards the Manta III, which is chased by the Coast Guard, and decides to say a final goodbye to his grandparents before jumping overboard, making the Coast Guard stop to rescue him, enabling the residents to escape. The Antarean ship appears, Walter recompenses Jack for his boat and Jack embraces Kitty for the last time before escaping in a life raft as the Manta III boards the Antarean vessel and departs. A memorial service is subsequently held for the missing residents. David looks toward the sky and smiles while at the same moment, lightyears away, the Antarean ship approaches Antarea.

== Cast ==
- Don Ameche as Art Selwyn
- Wilford Brimley as Ben Luckett
- Hume Cronyn as Joe Finley
- Brian Dennehy as Walter
- Jack Gilford as Bernie Lefkowitz
- Steve Guttenberg as Jack Bonner
- Maureen Stapleton as Mary Luckett
- Jessica Tandy as Alma Finley
- Gwen Verdon as Bess McCarthy
- Herta Ware as Rose Lefkowitz
- Tahnee Welch as Kitty
- Barret Oliver as David
- Linda Harrison as Susan
- Tyrone Power Jr. as Pillsbury
- Clint Howard as John Dexter
- Charles Lampkin as Pops
- Rance Howard as St. Petersburg detective
- Jim Fitzpatrick as Dock Worker (uncredited)

Casting for the film and its sequel was overseen by casting director Beverly McDermott.

== Production ==
Robert Zemeckis was originally hired as director, and spent a year working on it in development. He was at the time directing Romancing the Stone, another film for the same studio, 20th Century Fox. Fox executives previewed Romancing the Stone before its release in 1984 and hated it. That, in addition to his two previous directorial efforts, I Wanna Hold Your Hand and Used Cars, both being commercial failures — though critically acclaimed — led Fox to fire Zemeckis as director of Cocoon. He was replaced with Ron Howard.

Location filming took place in St. Petersburg, Florida, between August 20 and November 1, 1984.

Wilford Brimley was only 49 when he was cast as a senior citizen, and turned 50 during filming; he was as much as 26 years younger than the actors playing the other elderly characters. In order to look the part, Brimley bleached his hair and moustache to turn them gray, and had wrinkles and liver spots drawn on his face.

Speaking about the cast, Howard said in 2025: "I had seven veterans. Among the men, four different working styles. Wilford Brimley was totally improvisational. He was a younger guy and much more independent in his spirit and tone and sensibilities. He ... wanted to be in the moment. And Don Ameche was an old-school Hollywood guy 'Tell me my lines, show me my mark, and I will deliver what the script suggests should be delivered and do what the director wants.' The other two guys were in between. Jack Gilford was a comedian. Hume Cronyn was a playwright as well as an actor. They could riff with Wilford a little bit. And it elevated the tone of this genre movie. There was an honesty to these guys that I really liked. But Don could not keep up with Wilford’s improvisational vibe. In rehearsal, he tightened up because he didn’t understand how to do that. And the writer and I started slipping him jokes and lines, things he could pretend were ad-libs."

The retirement community's main building was designed with a unique curving hallway. Upon seeing Cocoon, Star Trek creator Gene Roddenberry thought it was a very cool aesthetic. When set designs were being done for Star Trek: The Next Generation, the hallway sets from the old folks home of Cocoon were redressed and became the hallways of the Enterprise-D.

== Soundtrack ==
Cocoon

Film score by James Horner
- Released: 1985; September 1997
- Recorded: 1985
- Genre: Soundtrack
- Length: 44:23
- Label: Polydor

Professional ratings
Review scores
Source	Rating
Filmtracks	4/5 stars

The score was composed and conducted by James Horner, and performed by the Hollywood Studio Symphony. The soundtrack was released twice, through Polydor Records in 1985 and a reprint through P.E.G. in 1997 and features eleven tracks of score and a vocal track performed by Michael Sembello. Despite the reprint, it is still considered a rarity among soundtrack collectors.

In 2013, an expanded soundtrack consisting of over 62 minutes of Horner's score was released by Intrada Records and Fox Music.

== Reception ==
Cocoon received mostly positive critical reception. The film holds an 82% "Fresh" rating on Rotten Tomatoes from 49 critics. The critical consensus reads: "Though it may be too sentimental for some, Ron Howard's supernatural tale of eternal youth is gentle and heartwarming, touching on poignant issues of age in the process". Metacritic gave the film a score of 65 based on 18 reviews, indicating "generally favorable" reviews.

The film was also a box office hit, making over $76 million in North America where it became the sixth highest-grossing film of 1985.

=== Critical response ===
Janet Maslin of The New York Times wrote that "Mr. Howard brings a real sweetness to his subject, as does the film's fine cast of veteran stars; he has also given Cocoon the bright, expansive look of a hot-weather hit. And even when the film begins to falter, as it does in its latter sections, Mr. Howard's touch remains reasonably steady. He does the most he can with material that, after an immensely promising opening, heads into the predictable territory of Spielberg-inspired beatific science fiction". Variety called it "a fountain of youth fable, which imaginatively melds galaxy fantasy with the lives of aging mortals in a Florida retirement home [and] weaves a mesmerizing tale".

== Accolades ==
Award	Category	Nominee(s)	Result	Ref.
Academy Awards	Best Supporting Actor	Don Ameche	Won	
Academy Awards	Best Visual Effects	Ken Ralston, Ralph McQuarrie, Scott Farrar, and David Berry	Won	
Artios Awards	Best Casting for Feature Film – Drama	Penny Perry and Beverly McDermott	Nominated	
Directors Guild of America Awards	Outstanding Directorial Achievement in Motion Pictures	Ron Howard	Nominated	
Golden Globe Awards	Best Motion Picture – Musical or Comedy		Nominated	
Hugo Awards	Best Dramatic Presentation	Ron Howard, Tom Benedek, and David Saperstein	Nominated	
Saturn Awards	Best Science Fiction Film		Nominated	
Saturn Awards	Best Director	Ron Howard	Won	
Saturn Awards	Best Actor	Hume Cronyn	Nominated	
Saturn Awards	Best Actress	Jessica Tandy	Nominated	
Saturn Awards	Best Supporting Actress	Gwen Verdon	Nominated	
Saturn Awards	Best Writing	Tom Benedek	Nominated	
Saturn Awards	Best Music	James Horner	Nominated	
ShoWest Convention	Director of the Year Award	Ron Howard	Won	
ShoWest Convention	Producer of the Year	David Brown, Richard D. Zanuck, and Lili Fini Zanuck	Won	
Venice Film Festival	Young Venice Award	Ron Howard	Won	
Writers Guild of America Awards	Best Screenplay – Written Directly for the Screen	Tom Benedek	Nominated	
Young Artist Awards	Best Family Motion Picture – Drama		Won	

== Legacy ==
=== Brimley/Cocoon line meme ===
Wilford Brimley's age during the production and release of the film has been the subject of a popular Internet meme concerning aging. Brimley, who was only 50 years old when the film was released, was relatively young to play a senior citizen. When Tom Cruise turned 50 in 2012, many juxtaposed his role in the ongoing Mission: Impossible franchise to Brimley's role in Cocoon, noting that Cruise was continuing to headline a major action franchise at the same age Brimley played an aging senior (coincidentally, Cruise and Brimley starred together in The Firm in 1993). This has resulted in the Brimley/Cocoon line meme, in which an actor who reaches 18,530 days of age (the exact age Brimley was when Cocoon premiered) has crossed it. A 2018 article in The New Yorker by Ian Crouch argued that the meme highlighted how perceptions of aging have changed since the release of Cocoon.
