= Beverly McDermott =

American casting director

- Born: Beverly Horgan; 1928 or 1929; Somerville, Massachusetts, U.S.
- Died: January 19, 2012 (aged 83); Hollywood, Florida, U.S.
- Occupation: American casting director,
- Spouse(s): Jack McDermott (19??-2012; her death); 2 children

Beverly McDermott, C.S.A. (née Horgan; 1928 or 1929 – January 19, 2012) was an American casting director whose career spanned more than forty years. Her 250 film and television credits included Lenny, Cocoon, Scarface, Cocoon: The Return, and Airport 77.

== Career ==
Working from South Florida (rather than California), she became one of the state's highest profile casting directors. McDermott was the first Floridian casting director to join the Casting Society of America. She also cast for television series which filmed in Florida, including The Jackie Gleason Show which was taped in Miami between 1966 and 1970. She performed as a champion horse rider, performing alongside some of the best known names of the time, including Arthur Godfrey, Roy Rogers, and Dale Evans.

McDermott worked separately as the Vice President of Women in Motion Pictures and the Academy of Motion Picture Arts and Sciences. McDermott and her husband, Jack McDermott, have been credited with discovering Freddy Cannon, a singer popular during the 1960s whose hits included "Tallahassee Lassie" in 1959. The couple produced the comeback performance of family friend Connie Francis, which was held in 1989 at the Diplomat Hotel in Hollywood, Florida.

She cast for Burt Reynolds' 1985 film, Stick. and for Reynolds' short-lived television series, B.L. Stryker, which aired on ABC from 1989-90. The series was filmed in Palm Beach, Florida.

== Personal life/death ==
McDermott, a resident of Hollywood, Florida, died at a hospice there on January 19, 2012, aged 83. She was survived by her husband, Jack McDermott; daughter, Cheryl; son, Richard; and two siblings, Paul Horgan and Eileen Crowley.

== Film casting credits ==
McDermott cast for more than 250 films, many set or filmed in Florida. Notable films include:

- Tony Rome (1967)
- Lenny (1974)
- Airport '77 (1977)
- Black Sunday (1977)
- Absence of Malice (1981)
- Scarface (1983)
- Stick (1985)
- Cocoon (1985)
- Cocoon: The Return (1988)
