= Cec Luining =

Profile
- Positions: Guard, End

Personal information
- Born: June 28, 1931; Winnipeg, Manitoba, Canada
- Died: November 20, 1998 (aged 67); Winnipeg, Manitoba, Canada
- Listed height: 6 ft 0 in (1.83 m)
- Listed weight: 210 lb (95 kg)

Career history
- 1954–1963: Winnipeg Blue Bombers

Awards and highlights
- 4× Grey Cup champion (1958, 1959, 1961, 1962)

Cecil Roy Luining (June 28, 1931 – November 20, 1998) was a Canadian professional football player who played for the Winnipeg Blue Bombers. He won the Grey Cup with them in 1958, 1959, 1961 and 1962. After his football, he was a dairy retailer, a member of the Selkirk City Council, and president of the Gull Lake Ratepayers Association. He died of a heart attack in 1998 after a Grey Cup parade in Winnipeg.
