= Richard Berry Jr. House =

Richard Berry Jr. House may refer to:

- Richard Berry Jr. House (Columbus, Ohio)
- Richard Berry Jr. House (Springfield, Kentucky)
