= Bill Berry (director) =

American Broadway director

Bill Berry is the American Producing Director for The 5th Avenue Theatre in Seattle, Washington. Berry served as associate producing artistic director and casting director from 2002 through 2009. During that time, he directed productions of West Side Story (Seattle Times Footlight Award), Wonderful Town (Seattle Times Footlight Award), The Wizard of Oz, and Smokey Joe's Cafe. He will make his Broadway directing debut this summer as First Date the Musical moves into the Longacre Theatre. Berry's directing work has been seen at theaters across the country, most recently at New Jersey's Paper Mill Playhouse where he directed a critically acclaimed production of On the Town.

Directing highlights include Cabaret performed at The 5th Avenue Theatre, St. Paul's Ordway Center (Ivey Award), San Jose's American Musical Theatre, and Houston's Theatre Under the Stars, as well as the smash hits First Date and RENT at The 5th.

Most recently at The 5th Avenue, Berry directed The Music Man, Little Shop of Horrors, and Carousel. In the 2015-/16 season, he will helm How to Succeed in Business Without Really Trying.

From 2002 to 2009, he served as the producing director for The 5th Avenue's education and outreach programs. During that time he significantly expanded the scope and impact of these initiatives, including spearheading the creation of Fridays at The 5th and The 5th Avenue Awards Honoring Excellence in High School Musical Theater, as well as substantially increasing the reach of the Adventure Musical Theatre Touring Company throughout the Northwest. These programs combined now serve 60,000 students annually. He also initiated the Show Talk series, which seeks to deepen the theater-going experience. Prior to his work at The 5th Avenue Theatre, Berry was a freelance theater artist based in New York City.
