= Mark Berry =

Mark Berry may refer to:

- Mark Berry (weightlifter) (1896–1958), American weight lifter, author and trainer
- Mark Berry (baseball) (born 1962), American baseball player, coach, and manager
- Mark Berry (dancer) (born 1964), British dancer and percussionist, commonly known as Bez
- Mark Berry (lawyer), chair of the Commerce Commission, in New Zealand
- Mark H. Berry, American politician
- Mark S. Berry, American music producer
- Mark Berry (British Army officer), British general
