= Albert Berry =

Albert Berry may refer to:

- Albert Berry (parachutist) (1878–?), one of two individuals claiming to have made the first parachute jump from an airplane
- Albert S. Berry (1836–1908), United States Representative from Kentucky
