= Daniel McIntyre Collegiate Institute =

High school in Winnipeg, Manitoba

Location
- 720 Alverstone Street; Winnipeg, Manitoba, R3E 2H1; Canada; 49.8995°N 97.1705°W

Information
- School type: Public High School
- Motto: Home of The Maroons
- Founded: 1892 (as Winnipeg Collegiate Institute)
- School district: Winnipeg School Division
- Superintendent: Matt Henderson
- Area trustee: Perla Javate
- Principal: Melody Woloschuk
- Vice Principal: Charles Bendu
- Vice Principal: Tamara Rondeau
- Grades: 9 - 12
- Enrollment: 1159 (2025-2026)
- Language: English
- Area: West End
- Colour: Maroon
- Nickname: Maroons
- Team name: Daniel McIntyre Maroons
- Website: www.winnipegsd.ca/schools/danielmcintyre

Daniel McIntyre Collegiate Institute (DMCI) is a public high school located in Winnipeg, Manitoba. The School is named after Daniel McIntyre, Winnipeg's First School Superintendent.

== History ==
Former seal of DMCI, phased out in late 2025.

DMCI had its start in 1882 as the eight-student Winnipeg Collegiate department of the Louise Street School (later replaced by the Argyle School), and then moved to Central School for the next nine years. In 1892 the secondary students moved to Winnipeg's first high school, the Winnipeg Collegiate Institute, which was replaced in 1923 by Daniel McIntyre Collegiate Institute.

== Athletics ==
DMCI offers following sports:

- Badminton
- Basketball
- Cross Country
- Football
- Soccer
- Track & Field
- VolleyBall

== Advanced Placement Program ==
DMCI offers seven' Advanced Placement (AP) courses:

- Art
- Biology
- Calculus
- Capstone
- Chemistry
- English
- Physics
- Psychology

== Capstone Diploma Program ==
The Capstone Diploma Program is a program provided by the College Board that helps Students develop Skills in research, analysis, and collaboration & presentation. It consists of:

- AP Seminar
- AP Research

== Medical Professionals Program ==
The Medical Professionals Program is a three-year integrated program for students interested in a career in the medical field. This program includes off-site learning at Winnipeg medical institutions, and students will have internship or mentorship opportunities.

== Notable alumni ==
- Dave Berry (1921–2007), CFL player and Grey Cup champion
- Karen Busby (1958–2026) Human rights law professor at u of Manitoba, and human rights in Canada advocate.
- Dyson Carter (1910–1996), scientist, writer, and Communist propagandist
- Ernie Dickens {1921–1985}, NHL player
- Markus Howell, CFL player and coach
- George Johnson (1920–1995), Manitoba Lieutenant Governor
- Cec Luining (1931–1998), CFL player
- Bill Norrie (1929–2012), Winnipeg mayor
- Howard Pawley (1934–2015), Manitoba premier
- Paul Platz (1920–2012), hockey player
- Hal Sigurdson (1932–2012), journalist
- Ian David Sinclair (1913–2006), president and CEO of Canadian Pacific Railway, senator
- Kurt Winter (1946–1997), musician with The Guess Who
- Robert Andjelic (1946–), entrepreneur and largest private farmland owner in Canada
