= Bruce Berry =

Bruce Berry may refer to:

- Bruce Berry (academic) (1940–2014), British perpetual student
- Bruce Berry (roadie) (1950–1973), American roadie for the members of Crosby, Stills, Nash & Young
- D. Bruce Berry (1924–1998), American comic book artist
