= Bill Berry (Australian footballer) =

Australian rules footballer

Personal information
- Full name: William Berry
- Born: 27 June 1957 (age 69)
- Original team: Strathmore (EDFL)
- Height: 196 cm (6 ft 5 in)
- Weight: 92 kg (203 lb)

Playing career^{1}
Years	Club	Games (Goals)
1975–1977	Essendon	14 (4)
1979–1982	Footscray	43 (18)
1984–1985	North Melbourne	12 (0)
Total		69 (22)
- ^{1} Playing statistics correct to the end of 1985.

William Berry (born 27 June 1957) is a former Australian rules footballer who played with Essendon, Footscray and North Melbourne in the Victorian Football League (VFL).

After making his way up from the Under-19s, Berry was unable to put together regular senior appearances and spent most of his time at Essendon in the reserves.

The former Strathmore player went to East Fremantle for the 1978 season and when he returned to Victoria a year later he joined Footscray. Berry was a back up ruckman to Ian Hampshire in his first three years but became Footscray's first ruckman midway through the 1982 season, when Hampshire retired. He didn't play a senior game in 1983, when Western Australian recruit Andrew Purser took over as number one ruckman with a strong debut season.

Berry moved to North Melbourne in 1984 and played 11 games in the second half of the year, due to an injury to Gary Dempsey.
