= Richard Hewes =

American politician (1926–2014)

Member of the Maine House of Representatives
- In office 1966–1976
- Preceded by: Richard N. Berry
- Succeeded by: Nancy Masterton

Member of the Maine Senate
- In office 1976–1978
- Preceded by: Richard N. Berry
- Succeeded by: Barbara A. Gill

Personal details
- Born: August 16, 1926 Biddeford, Maine, U.S.
- Died: July 8, 2014 (aged 87) Cape Elizabeth, Maine, U.S.
- Party: Republican
- Education: University of Maine
- Occupation: Attorney

Richard David Hewes (August 16, 1926 – July 8, 2014) was an American politician from Cape Elizabeth, Maine. A Republican, Hewes served as Speaker of the Maine House of Representatives from 1973 to 1974. Another Republican Speaker was not elected until Robert Nutting in December 2010.

== Background ==
Hewes was born at Webber Hospital in Biddeford, Maine, grew up in Saco and attended Thornton Academy. He served in the United States Army during World War II. Hewes received his Bachelor of Science degree from The University of Maine and his law degree from Boston University Law School. Hewes practiced law in Saco, Maine with his father and then moved to Boston, Massachusetts to practice law before returning to Maine and was a trial lawyer and senior partner in Portland.

Hewes served in the Maine House of Representatives from 1966 to 1976. From 1972–1974, Hewes served as House Speaker. In that position, Hewes was noted for building ample public parking around the State House. He left office to advocate for the Equal Rights Amendment. In 1976, Hewes was narrowly elected to the State Senate from District 8. He served only one term in the Maine Senate. In 1983, Hewes was appointed by Governor Joseph Brennan to the Cumberland County Commission, where he stayed until the 1990s.

== Death ==
Hewes died at his home in Cape Elizabeth of Parkinson's disease on July 8, 2014. He was 87.
