= Mary Ella Kirby Berry =

Medical missionary in the 1900s

- Born: Mary Ella Kirby; March 1916; Sadiya, India
- Died: August 2, 1957 (aged 41)
- Education: University of Yangon; Denison University; Temple University (MD)
- Spouse: Earl Harmon Berry (m. 1948)
- Children: 4

Mary Ella Berry (née Kirby; March 1916 – August 2, 1957) was a medical missionary in the 1900s, who helped develop the Jorhat leprosy colony and the Gauhati Women's Hospital in Assam, India, also known as the Jubilee Hospital, which became the Satribari Christian Hospital in Assam. She served as director of the Satribari Hospital from 1945 to 1952. Most of her work was in treating leprosy. As the child of two Baptist medical missionaries who founded a leprosy colony in Jorhat, India, She spent her early life and education between India and the United States. She directed the Jorhat Leprosy program at Jorhat Mission Hospital from 1952 to 1957.

== Early life and education ==
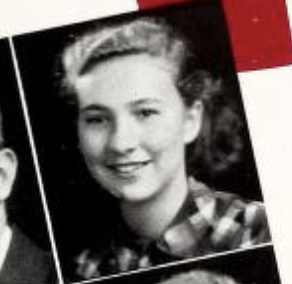
Senior Class Picture from Denison University Class of 1939. From Denison University Adytum Archives.

Mary Ella Kirby was born in March 1916, in Sadiya, Assam, India to Herbert William Kirby and Mary Ella Reeves. The family lived in Assam, India until 1922 when they returned to the United States. They moved to Granville, Ohio, where Berry participated in the World Wide Guild, the Baptist Young People's Union, and the League of Health Guard Knights with her Sunday school.

In 1932, following Berry's sophomore year of high school, she and her sister Frances returned to Assam. In Assam, Berry finished high school at Mt. Hermon School in Darjeeling, India. She attended Judson College in Rangoon, Burma.

In 1936, Berry went to the United States to finish her college education at Denison University. She joined the Alpha Omicron Pi sorority and was part of the 1938 graduating class. She went on to receive her M.D. from Temple University, where she was one of 12 women in her class. While in Pennsylvania, Berry interned at the Lancaster General Hospital and did her surgical residency at Temple under Wayne Babcock. She was a member of the Baptist Temple of Philadelphia during her years in Pennsylvania.

Berry spoke at churches and Denison to spread awareness about India and raise funds for supplies. She did a string of talks called the Radium Talks where she grew her Radium Fund, which allowed her to take 100 mg of radium, vital for cancer treatment, with her on her arrival to India in 1945.

== Career ==
Berry left the United States via boat for Assam as part of the North American Baptist Woman's Foreign Mission Society in 1944 and reached India in February 1945. She enrolled herself in language classes for multiple weeks until she was once again fluent in Assamese.

Berry was a missionary in Assam from February 1945 to August 1957, but was part of the Assam community throughout her entire life. Her sister Frances K Isbell put together Berry's letters and diaries along with other words about her in a book in her memory. She used holistic approaches along with medicine, which allowed many patients to return to good health and be released from the colony. She made radium available to Assam. The Bethlehem Baptist Church in Pennsylvania created a circle called the Dr. Mary Kirby Mission Circle that spread awareness about her work in India and raised money for her efforts.

In 1950, an earthquake broke multiple river blocks, flooding parts of Assam and ruining infrastructure. Berry was part of relief units put together to respond to the crisis at the Gauhati hospital. Following the earthquake, her husband worked with other builders to rebuild many houses, and community buildings.

Berry was the head of the Jubilee Hospital, now the Satribari Christian Hospital from 1945 until 1952 when she took over the Christian Leper Colony in Jorhat which her parents founded. She served as director of the leprosy program at Jorhat Mission Hospital from 1952 until her death.

== Personal life ==
She and her future husband, Earl Harmon Berry, first met in 1945 in Gauhati while he was stationed in Assam as part of the Sanitation Corps and pest control.

In 1948, she removed a growth from her father, assuming he had cancer. After taking her father to the United States for more care, she and Earl got engaged. They wed on September 2, 1948, in New Jersey. Berry. Her bridesmaid party were dressed in traditional Assamese clothing. Shortly after their marriage, the pair moved to India. They had four children, all born in India.

== Death ==
Berry died on August 2, 1957, aged 41, of sepsis during the 1957–1958 flu pandemic.
