= Randall Berry =

American electric engineer

Randall A. Berry is a professor of Electrical and Computer Engineering at Northwestern University, Evanston, Illinois. He was named Fellow of the Institute of Electrical and Electronics Engineers (IEEE) in 2014 for contributions to resource allocation and interference management in wireless networks.

Berry obtained B.S. in electrical engineering from Missouri University of Science and Technology and later got his M.S. and Ph.D. in electrical engineering and computer science from Massachusetts Institute of Technology.
