= Mary Jones Berry =

American aerospace engineer

Mary Virginia Jones Berry is an American aerospace engineer, the first female licensed professional engineer in Virginia. She is known for her work on the design of solid-propellant rockets.

== Education and career ==
Berry is originally from Blacksburg, Virginia, and graduated from Blacksburg High School. Her father, James Beverly Jones, was head of the mechanical engineering department at Virginia Tech. Berry graduated with honors from Virginia Tech in 1962, with a degree in mechanical engineering. She was the third female mechanical engineering student at the university, and in 1967 she became the first woman to become a licensed professional engineer in Virginia. She continued her graduate study at George Washington University, receiving a master's degree there.

Berry spent her professional career working on rocket propulsion at the Atlantic Research Corporation, later acquired by Aerojet Rocketdyne. At the time of the acquisition, she became executive director of the new subsidiary, Virginia engineering. Her work for Aerojet Rocketdyne included the development of missiles for the US military including the M270 Multiple Launch Rocket System, FIM-92 Stinger, and the boosters for the Tomahawk missile family. One of her key innovations was the development of a cost-saving molded plastic rocket nozzle for these systems; she also served on a board that reviewed small spacecraft design for NASA.

She retired in 2008. She served on the Virginia Tech board of visitors from 1984 until 1988, and in 1999 was president of the university's alumni association. She also served on the Virginia State Board of Engineers, Land Surveyors, and Landscape Architects from 1984 to 1988, the first woman on the board. In 2010 she was named to the board of visitors of the University of Mary Washington in Virginia.

== Recognition ==
The Society of Women Engineers (SWE) gave Berry their 1993 Upward Mobility Award. Berry was named as a Fellow of the SWE in 1998, and a Fellow of the American Institute of Aeronautics and Astronautics in 2011.

Berry received Virginia Tech's University Distinguished Achievement Award in 1992, its College of Engineering Distinguished Service Award in 1994, and its Alumni Distinguished Service Award in 1999. She was the first woman to receive the Distinguished Achievement Award. She was named a distinguished alumnus of the Virginia Tech College of Engineering in 1997. Virginia Tech named Berry to its Academy of Engineering Excellence in 2004.

The DC Council of Engineering and Architectural Societies named Berry as Engineer of the Year in 2002. The Library of Virginia named her as a 2017 Virginia Woman in History.
