= Justice Berry =

Justice Berry may refer to:

- Janis M. Berry (fl. 1960s–2000s), associate justice of the Massachusetts Appeals Court
- John M. Berry (1827–1887), associate justice of the Minnesota Supreme Court
- Thornton G. Berry Jr. (1904–1987), associate justice of the Supreme Court of Appeals of West Virginia
- William A. Berry (judge) (1915–2004), associate justice of the Oklahoma Supreme Court

== See also ==
- Judge Berry (disambiguation)
