= Lillian Gay Berry =

American classical philologist

Lillian Gay Berry (1872–1962) was an American classicist. She taught for over four decades at Indiana University, where she was the first woman to be promoted to full professor at Indiana University.
