= Richard Berry (scientist) =

British-Canadian chemist

Richard M. Berry
- Born: Richard M. Berry
- Known for: Nanocellulose
- Scientific career
- Fields: Nanocellulose; Pulp and Paper
- Institutions: FPInnovations; CelluForce

Richard M. Berry is a British–Canadian chemist who specializes in the production of nanocellulose. He is Vice-President, Technology & Chief Technology Officer at the CelluForce company in Montreal, Quebec, Canada. He is a member of the Board of Directors (2016-2018) for TAPPI where he has been a fellow since 2005. Berry has published more than 100 articles and holds 24 patents.

== Early life and education ==
Berry was raised in the United Kingdom where his father was a member of the Royal Navy. He earned an undergraduate degree in geology and chemistry from Keele University. He received a PhD in chemistry at McGill University. Following his studies, Berry took a research position at the FPInnovations company.

== Awards ==
In 2014 Berry was named the first recipient of TAPPI's International Nanotechnology Division's Technical Award for his work on the industrial development of Cellulose nanocrystals (CNC). In 2012, Berry was honored with the Purvis Memorial award. Berry was a co-recipient with Luc Lapierre and Jean Bouchard of the 2012 Howard Rapson Memorial Award for their paper Assessment of Pulp Machine White Water Quality of Market Kraft Pulp Mills.
