= First Date (musical) =

- Original Broadway Logo
- Music: Alan Zachary; Michael Weiner
- Lyrics: Alan Zachary; Michael Weiner
- Book: Austin Winsberg
- Productions: 2012 Seattle; 2013 Broadway; 2026 Cape Town

First Date is a musical with a book by Austin Winsberg and music and lyrics by Alan Zachary and Michael Weiner. Based around the concept of a blind date, the musical made its world premiere during 2012 at Seattle's ACT Theatre in a 5th Avenue Theatre co-production and made its Broadway debut August 8, 2013, at the Longacre Theatre.

== Production history ==
=== Seattle (2012) ===
The original production of the musical ran at Seattle's ACT Theatre, from March 10 until May 20, 2012.

=== Broadway (2013) ===
First Date began previews on July 9, 2013, at the Longacre Theatre, New York City, and its official opening night was August 8, 2013. The show evolved from a book by Austin Winsberg, with music and lyrics by Alan Zachary and Michael Weiner, inspired largely by personal experiences. It is directed by Bill Berry, with musical staging by Josh Rhodes, orchestrations by August Eriksmoen, scenic design by David Gallo, lighting design by Mike Baldassari and sound design by Kai Harada. In May 2013, Zachary Levi and Krysta Rodriguez were announced as the show's leads playing roles of Aaron and Casey. The role of Aaron was played by Eric Ankrim for the July 16–21 preview dates due to a Comic-Con commitment for Levi. Ankrim previously played the part in Seattle.

The Broadway production closed after a run of five months, on January 5, 2014, after 34 previews and 174 regular performances. It played to an average 71.54% capacity. Levi gave a speech on closing night.

=== Tokyo (2014) ===
First Date debuted as the first non-English company in Japan in November 2014.

=== Buenos Aires (2016) ===
The show, titled Cita a Ciegas, opened in Buenos Aires on May 10, 2016, in the Teatro Maipo on the Avenida Corrientes. The original run of 8 performances was extended to 6 months, with 43 performances in all.

Cita a Ciegas received ten nominations for three different awards in 2016.

- Hugo Awards
  - Best Musical
  - Best Leading Actor (Mariano Zito)
  - Best Director (Sebastián Prada)
  - Best Supporting Actor (Nacho de Santis) – winner
  - Best Musical Arrangements (Tomás Mayer Wolf)
  - Best Translation and/or Adaptation (Marcelo Kotliar) – winner
  - Best Newcomer (Lucía Mundstock)
- Florencio Sánchez Awards
  - Best Leading Actor in a Musical (Mariano Zito)
  - Best Leading Actress in a Musical (Lucía Mundstock)
- Trinidad Guevara Awards
  - Best Newcomer (Lucía Mundstock)

After a six-month break, the company returned with a second season of the show, which opened on May 4, 2017, still in the Maipo Kabaret.

Directed by Sebastián Prada (general director) and Victoria Loescher (vocal director), with the performances of Mariano Zito (Aaron), Lucía Mundstock (Casey), Mica Pierani Méndez (Woman #1), Lucas Gentili (Man #1), Laura Montini (Woman #2), Mariano Condoluci (Man #2) and Nacho de Santis (Man #3). Translation and adaptation of the script by Marcelo Kotliar, Lucía Mundstock and Sebastián Prada; musical arrangements by Tomás Mayer Wolf and Mariano Cantarini; musical directors: Mariano Cantarini, Lucas Crawley and Nicolás Roldán.

=== Melbourne (2016) ===
Pursued by Bear mounted the Australian Production at Chapel off Chapel, Melbourne. The production ran from 1–11 September 2016. The cast included Jordon Mahar and Rebecca Hetherington as Aaron and Casey. Daniel Cosgrove, Nicole Melloy, Danielle O'Malley, Adam Porter and Stephen Valeri made up the Ensemble. The creative team included Mark Taylor, Stephanie Lewendon-Lowe and Joel Anderson as the Director, Musical Director and Choreographer respectively. The band was made up of Stephanie Lewendon-Lowe on piano, Timothy Forrester on reeds (piccolo, flute, clarinet, alto saxophone), Caleb Garfinkel on guitar, Anthony Chircop on bass (electric and double bass) and Campbell Philips on drum kit.

=== London (2019) ===
It was announced in December 2018 that First Date would be included in a Musical theatre festival at The Other Palace in London.

=== Moscow (2019) ===
The Russian premiere of the musical took place on September 24, 2019, in the MDM theatre in Moscow. As of 2024, the show is still on.

=== Croatia (2026) ===
The Croatian premiere of the musical was announced on February 11th, 2026 set for March 6th, 2026.

=== South Africa (2026) ===
The South African premiere of the musical is set to open on October 21st, 2026 at The Homecoming Centre's Avalon Theatre. Produced by Origen Productions and directed by Byron Bure. The cast includes Emma Amber as Casey, Ethan Saunders as Aaron, alongside William Young, Kirsten Pienaar, Asanda Mngadi, Zoe Chetty, Robert Shenton, Nikita Latimer and Ethan Dunk.

== Plot ==
The show begins with five New Yorkers sharing their dating disasters ("The One"). The scene shifts to an unnamed restaurant in modern-day New York City. Aaron, a quirky man, enters the restaurant and begins to talk with the waiter. Based on how nervous he is, the waiter guesses that this is a first date. After the waiter seats Aaron, an artsy woman named Casey enters the restaurant. She spies Aaron putting in eye drops as he waits for her, making her dread the date even more; she then orders strong drinks in hopes that the date will be quick and painless. Casey and Aaron exchange some small talk and it is revealed that the date was set up by Casey's sister, Lauren, whose husband Kevin is a co-worker of Aaron's. Through the small talk, they both develop first impressions of each other ("First Impressions").

Casey's friend Reggie calls her during the date, offering for Casey to use his call as a way out of the date ("Bailout #1"), but Casey thinks enough of Aaron to ignore the call. Aaron and Casey begin to bond over friends from summer camp and high school after discovering their hometowns are near each other. Aaron casually makes a joke about Jewish geography, to which Casey responds she's not Jewish. This leads Aaron to a dream sequence where he imagines his dead Grandma Ida, who scolds Aaron for not dating a nice Jewish girl instead. Casey's extremely Christian father then shows up in Aaron's dream sequence, and tells Aaron that he is not happy with the idea of Aaron becoming his son in law. Next, Aaron imagines the son he could potentially have with Casey confronting him about which religion to choose and how he wishes he wasn't born ("The Girl For You").

Aaron nervously asks her questions about religion hoping that she does have some Jewish in her before discovering she is an atheist. Relieved, he makes a joke about Casey's views on spirituality (she believes in the power of meditation), but it backfires when he accidentally insults her. This results in a long awkward pause ("The Awkward Pause"). Casey is then visited in her mind by her sister Lauren, who urges Casey not to screw this date up, because "Casey's biological clock is ticking," especially if she continues her current dating pattern of going the distance with bad boys on the first date and ruining any potential with nice guys like Aaron. Meanwhile, Aaron is visited by his best friend Gabe, who convinces him that the date is going well. However, Aaron then imagines his ex-girlfriend Allison, who tells him that she still sexually fantasizes about him ("Allison's Theme #1"). Gabe tells Aaron that he's romanticizing the memory of Allison, because he's only remembering the good things about her and not the bad things. He also tells Aaron to avoid bringing up Allison again, because it could ruin any future he might have with Casey.

Aaron decides to fix the date by making more jokes, which leads to talk of jobs. Aaron describes his job at Wall Street, and expresses that all he likes about the job is that it pays well. Casey works at an art gallery which makes her somewhat happy because she can study her craft, photography. Aaron mentions how good her exhibit looked which leads Casey to conclude that he googled her before the date. She immediately does the same thing to him, and the two of them bond over embarrassing stuff on the internet (I.E. Aaron played Dolly in his high school production of Hello Dolly) ("The World Wide Web is Forever" or "Total Loser").Casey is hungry so she asks Aaron to leave the bar and eat dinner with her. Casey initially wants to order a burger, but Lauren tells her it will give the impression that years from now she will be overweight, so she orders a salad instead. Aaron, on the other hand, wants a salad, but Gabe tells him that "salads are for wussies," so he orders a burger.

Having overheard Casey talking to herself about wanting a burger, Aaron asks her why she ordered the salad, convinced that she wants to give the impression of being careful about her body. She ignores him, but he says that he doesn't care what a girl looks like as long as she's happy. Casey is taken aback by this, having never dated anyone who would have said something like that. She imagines her two ex-boyfriends berating her and telling her why she should love them, stating "reasons" such as "I failed my GED" or " I only cheated on you twice" ("That's Why You Love Me"). This makes Casey miss dating "bad boys," leading her to ask Aaron if he's a bad boy, to which he replies with a no. Casey hastily calls off any potential relationship, saying they can be "just friends". Aaron offers to try to be a bad boy for her, but admits it probably wouldn't work.

Casey's phone rings again, with another call from Reggie, who is beginning to feel ignored ("Bailout #2"). When Aaron leaves the table to go to the bathroom, Lauren visits Casey once more, where Casey admits that she builds up walls to keep herself from getting hurt, despite her desire for a real, healthy relationship. She explains that she only dates "bad boys," or jerks, because she doesn't get her hopes up and is less disappointed when things don't work out. It is then revealed that her upbringing greatly influenced how she views relationships, having grown up with a mentally unstable mother and a father who left them and started a new family. Lauren, on the other hand, met her future husband in college at 24, and is happily married, confusing Casey's view of relationships even more ("Safer").

When Aaron returns to the table, he and Casey decide to officially call off the date. The waiter who seated them notices that they are the only ones not having a good time, so he performs a musical number that he wrote himself as the other two couples slow dance together. He pulls up Casey to dance, and pushes her to dance with Aaron ("I'd Order Love"). Their food finally arrives and Aaron, with what little hope he has left that things will end well, begs her to have just this one meal with him. Casey agrees, but decides she wants to set Aaron up with one of her friends to make up for their bad date. She asks him what kind of girl is his type, which gets him thinking about Allison again ("Allison's Theme #2"). She asks him if he wants a bad girl or somebody to take home to his mom, and Aaron says that he could probably bring any girl home to his mother. Casey begins to tease him, thinking this means his mom hates all of girls Aaron dates, but Aaron admits that his mother died when he was in tenth grade. He imagines her telling him everything she wished she had said to him, based on a letter she left him ("The Things I Never Said").

Casey is truly touched by Aaron's story and honesty, and subsequently ignores her phone when it rings again. Reggie is now convinced that Aaron killed her or kidnapped her because she hasn't picked up her phone, so he declares that he's coming to rescue her ("Bailout #3"). Casey realizes that she's beginning to like Aaron, and she asks him if they can switch their food so that they can both have what they want. She then remembers that she promised to set Aaron up with a friend, so she begins listing friends who would be a good match for Aaron. Casey ultimately decides it's her new friend Allison, which scares Aaron, thinking Casey is talking about his ex-girlfriend Allison. Much to Aaron's relief, it's not the same Allison, but Casey asks him why he reacted to dramatically to the name Allison. Aaron tells Casey about his relationship with Allison, and how she ended up leaving him at the altar. Casey decides to make Aaron try an exercise where he imagines Allison is standing right in front of him, and he has to break up with her. It doesn't start well, with Aaron only talking about how much he loves Allison, but with Casey's encouraging, he gets angry at Allison and lists everything he hated about her and how horribly she treated him ("In Love With You"). Casey and Aaron share an ecstatic embrace after Aaron's cathartic exchange with an imaginary Allison.

After Casey and Aaron finish their dinner, the waiter brings them the check. The whole restaurant freezes, wondering who is going to pay for dinner ("The Check!"). Casey wants them to split it but Aaron pays it, insisting that he genuinely wants to buy her dinner. Casey realizes that she likes Aaron so much that she doesn't want to ever have to say goodbye to him, so she ignores him as he leaves. Lauren appears again, angry at her for screwing things up again, but Casey ignores her. The restaurant closes, so Casey walks out; she then realizes what a big mistake she's made. After she has left, Reggie runs into the restaurant, only to discover that Casey is not dead and left alone. Exhausted, he decides to have a drink with the waiter, and the two of them form their own first impressions of each other ("First Impressions (reprise)"). The scene then shifts to the next block, where Casey stops Aaron from entering the subway to go home. She asks him to walk her home, which he does. Along the way, Casey decides that she feels a true connection and sees potential with Aaron, and Aaron feels like he would be willing to risk his heart again if it was for Casey. Throughout the walk, all of the voices that have been talking to them all night voice their opinions but Casey and Aaron ignore them. When they reach Casey's apartment, they say goodnight to each other and go their separate ways. However, Casey stands in front of her apartment building, not wanting to actually walk inside and leave Aaron, and Aaron can't seem to walk further down the street to leave. Casey and Aaron sing the last verse on opposite sides of the stage, and as Casey and Aaron finish the song, they run from opposite sides of the stage and kiss ("Something That Will Last").

== Musical numbers ==
The show is performed without an intermission.

- "The One" – Company
- "First Impressions" – Aaron, Casey
- "Bailout Song #1" – Reggie
- "The Girl For You" – Company
- "The Awkward Pause" – Company
- "Allison's Theme #1" – Allison
- "The World Wide Web Is Forever" – Company†
- "Total Loser" – Company††
- "That's Why You Love Me" – Edgy Ex-Boyfriends
- "Bailout Song #2" – Reggie
- "Safer" – Casey
- "I'd Order Love" – Waiter
- "Allison's Theme #2" – Aaron, Allison, Gabe
- "The Things I Never Said" – Aaron, Aaron's Mother
- "Bailout Song #3" – Reggie
- "In Love With You" – Aaron
- "The Check!" – Company
- "First Impressions (reprise)" – Reggie, Waiter††
- "Something That Will Last" – Casey, Aaron, Company

† Denotes a song that was cut before the official Broadway opening night.
†† Denotes a song that was not on the original Broadway cast recording.

== Principal roles and cast members ==
Character	Seattle (2012)	Broadway (2013)
Aaron	Eric Ankrim	Zachary Levi
Casey	Kelly Karbacz	Krysta Rodriguez
Woman #1 (Grandma Ida/Lauren/Aaron's Mother)	Billie Wildrick	Sara Chase
Man #1 (Gabe/Edgy British Guy)	Brandon O'Neill	Bryce Ryness
Woman #2 (Allison)	Vicki Noon	Kate Loprest
Man #2 (Reggie/Edgy Rocker Guy/Aaron's Future Son)	Benjamin Harris	Kristoffer Cusick
Man #3 (Waiter/Therapist/Casey's Father)	Richard Gray, Greg McCormick Allen	Blake Hammond
