= Dan McIntyre (activist) =

Canadian human rights activist (1950– 2001)

Danny Clarence "Dan" McIntyre (1950 – February 19, 2001) was chair of the Board of Governors of Toronto Metropolitan University, a former race relations commissioner for Ontario and a longtime human rights activist.

McIntyre was born in Saint John, New Brunswick to a Black family. He earned a Bachelor of Business Administration from the University of New Brunswick and a Master of Social Work from Dalhousie University and subsequently became in officer in the Canadian Human Rights Commission and was promoted to director of the Canadian Human Rights Commission for Ontario.

In 1986, he moved to the Ontario Human Rights Commission accepting the appointment of race relations commissioner for the province. During his tenure, he advocated mandatory affirmative action legislation and a race and ethnic relations policy to combat racism in schools. He subsequently served as executive director for race relations at the ministry of the solicitor general and correctional services, acting as a liaison between the black community and Ontario police forces.

After leaving public service, he served as a human rights consultant for KPMG Consulting.

In 1996, he was appointed to the Board of Governors of Ryerson Polytechnic University, becoming its chair in July 2000.

He was the first visible minority to chair Toronto Metropolitan University's board and was described as "a role model because our student body at Ryerson is so diverse."

McIntyre died on February 19, 2001 after suffering from a heart attack during a vacation at Negril, Jamaica. Following his death, Toronto Metropolitan University created the Dan McIntyre Human Rights Award in his honour, awarded to "Ryerson students who have demonstrated a commitment to human rights and justice reform through community service involvement."
