= David Barry (Irish physician) =

Irish physician and physiologist

Sir David Barry FRS
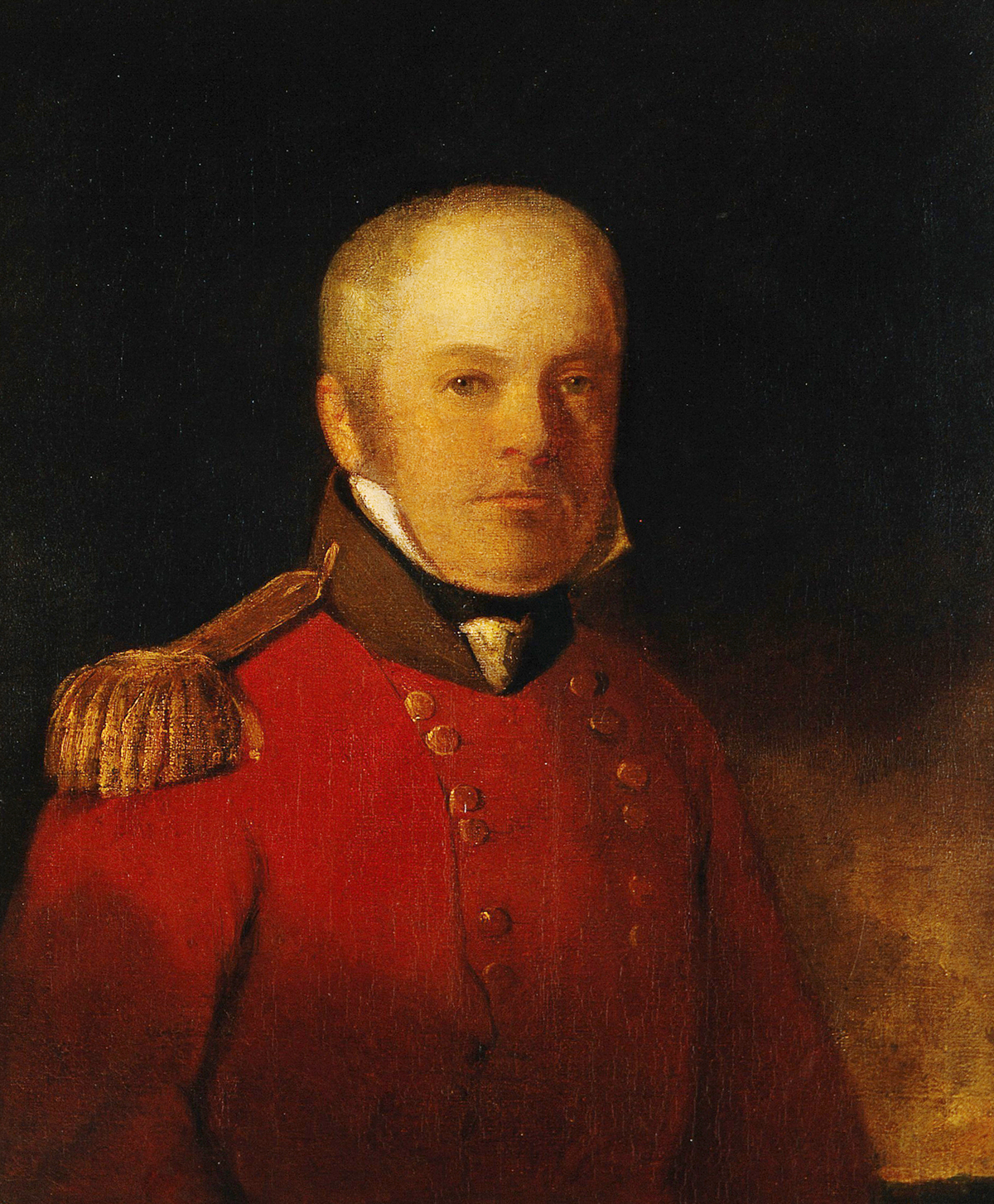
- Born: 12 March 1780; County Roscommon, Ireland
- Died: 4 November 1835 (aged 55); London, England

Sir David Barry FRS (12 March 1780 – 4 November 1835) was an Irish physician and physiologist.

== Life ==
Barry was born in County Roscommon, Ireland. He completed his medical education at home, and entered the army as an Assistant-Surgeon in 1806; present as surgeon, 58th foot, at the Battle of Salamanca; and afterwards held several Peninsular appointments.

== Studies and career ==
In 1822–26, he studied physiology and medicine at Paris, and there read several original papers before the Academy of Sciences and the Académie Nationale de Médecine on the influence of atmospheric pressure on various functions of the body. The experiments on which these were based were repeated before Cuvier, Duméril, Laennec, Cruvelhier, and other eminent men of science, and much commended. These researches were published in London in 1826 under the title given below, and brought Barry into much repute.

In 1828–29, he acted as English member with a commission of French doctors which visited Gibraltar to report on the causes of an epidemic of yellow fever there in 1828.

In 1831, he was appointed on a commission to report on the cholera, and visited Russia, being knighted on his return. Among other commissions on which he acted was one on the medical charities of Ireland.

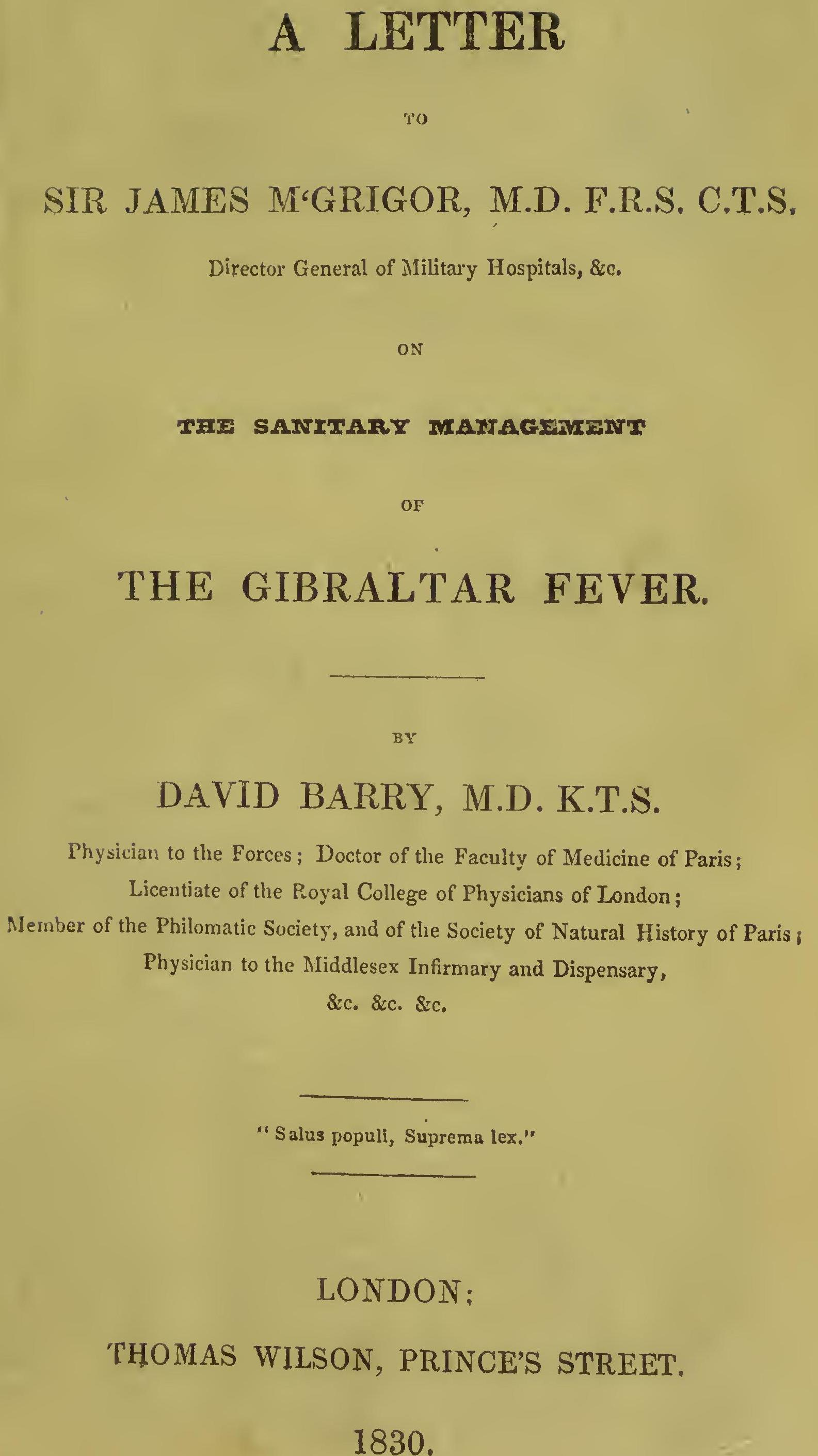
Letter related to the 1828 epidemic of Yellow Fever in Gibraltar

Having distinguished himself in the Peninsular War, he settled at Oporto as surgeon to the Portuguese forces. There he married Miss Whately, sister of the future Archbishop. Returning to England in 1820, he perfected himself by further study.

In 1826, he published his researches relative to the absorption of poison, and the means of counteracting it by the application of cupping-glasses. He was employed by Government in several medical inquiries, both at home and abroad, and was one of the commissioners in the investigations that led to the Factory Acts.

In 1828–29, he acted as English member with Nicolas Chervin, Pierre Louis, and Armand Trousseau (a commission of French doctors) which visited Gibraltar to report on the causes of an epidemic of yellow fever there in 1828.

In 1831, he was appointed on a commission to report on the cholera, and visited Russia, being knighted on his return. Among other commissions on which he acted were medical charities of Ireland.

== Deaths ==
He died suddenly at the age of 55 on 4 November 1835, in London, of an aneurysm.
