= Nyall Berry =

English boxer (born 1999)

Personal information
- Nickname: Non-Stop
- Nationality: English
- Born: 3 August 1999 (age 27)
- Weight: Super-bantamweight

Boxing career
- Stance: Orthodox

Boxing record
- Total fights: 18
- Wins: 16
- Win by KO: 6
- Losses: 2

Nyall Berry (born 3 August 1999) is an English professional boxer. He is a former English super-bantamweight champion and has also challenged for the IBF European title in the same weight division.

== Career ==
With a perfect record of 10 wins from 10 fights since turning professional in 2022, Berry faced Francesco De Rosa for the vacant IBF European super-bantamweight title at Coventry Skydome on 29 June 2024. Having been knocked to the canvas twice, he lost by stoppage in the eighth round.

He got back to winning ways with a first round stoppage of Jayro Fernando Duran at the Excelsior Sporting Club in Cannock on 26 September 2024, followed by a six-round points victory against Tampela Maharusi at Park Community Arena in Sheffield on 7 December 2024.

In his next outing, Berry took on Lewis Frimpong for the vacant English super-bantamweight title at York Hall in London on 15 March 2025. He won via stoppage in the third round to claim the first championship of his professional career.
