= FPInnovations =

FPInnovations is a not-for-profit R&D private organization which spans the pulp and paper industry, forest operations, wood products, and bio-sourced products. FPInnovations employs more than 400 specialists throughout Canada and has an annual operating budget of $76 million. Its membership totals to 180 industry companies. Its board of directors represents industry members as well as provincial and federal governments.

The organization's headquarters are located in Pointe-Claire, Quebec, and has its main research centers located in Vancouver, Quebec City, and Pointe-Claire, as well as regional offices located throughout Canada.

== History ==
FPInnovations came into existence April 1, 2007 through an amalgamation of Forintek Canada Corporation (founded in 1918), the Forest Engineering Research Institute of Canada (FERIC, founded in 1975), and the Pulp and Paper Research Institute of Canada (Paprican, founded in 1925) . Each of these institutes focused on different areas of the Canadian forest industry, and now operate within FPInnovations.

=== Website ===
https://web.fpinnovations.ca
