= Rod Berry =

American politician and lawyer

Member of the West Virginia House of Delegates
- In office 1987–1991

Personal details
- Born: Rodney T. Berry; March 6, 1948 Fairmont, West Virginia, U.S.
- Died: March 31, 2013 (aged 65) Wheeling, West Virginia, U.S.
- Spouse: Rita Nelson
- Children: 2
- Education: West Liberty University; West Virginia University (JD)
- Occupation: Politician, lawyer

Rodney T. Berry (March 6, 1948 – March 31, 2013) was an American politician and lawyer.

Born in Fairmont, West Virginia, Berry graduated from Union High School in Benwood, West Virginia, in 1966. He then received his bachelor's degree from West Liberty University in 1970 and then received his Juris Doctor degree from West Virginia University College of Law in 1973. He practiced law in Moundsville, West Virginia, and was a lobbyist. He served in the West Virginia House of Delegates in 1987–1991. He died in Wheeling, West Virginia.
