= James Berry =

James Berry may refer to:

== Entertainment ==
- James Berry (artist) (1906–1979), New Zealand artist, stamp and coin designer
- James Berry (entertainer) (1915–1969), American actor and dancer
- James Berry (poet) (1924–2017), Jamaican poet
- James Berry (writer) (1842–1914), Irish writer
- Jim Berry (cartoonist) (1932–2015), American comic strip artist

== Politics ==
- Jake Berry (James, born 1978), British politician
- James Berry (barrister) (born 1983), British politician
- James E. Berry (1881–1966), American politician
- James H. Berry (1841–1913), Governor and U.S. Senator of Arkansas

== Sports ==
- James Berry (footballer) (born 2000), English footballer
- Jim Berry (soccer) (1945–2020), Canadian soccer player
- Jim Berry (hurler) (born 1989), Wexford hurler
- James Eric Berry (born 1988), American former football safety

== Other ==
- James Berry (major-general) (died 1691), Parliamentary major-general who fought in the English Civil War
- James Berry (executioner) (1852–1913), English executioner, 1884–1891
- James Berry (surgeon) (1860–1946), British surgeon
- Jim Berry, president of the United States Chess Federation
- Jim Berry (news anchor) (born c. 1955), Miami news anchor
- James Gomer Berry, 1st Viscount Kemsley (1883–1968), Welsh publisher
- James Berry, Puritan leader of Seat Pleasant, Maryland

== See also ==
- Berry (disambiguation)
- Berry baronets
- Richard James Arthur Berry (1867–1962), British surgeon and professor of anatomy in Australia
