= Dave Berry (Canadian football) =

Canadian football player (1921–2007)

Profile
- Position: End

Personal information
- Born: December 11, 1921; Birkenhead, England
- Died: April 16, 2007 (aged 85); Westbank, British Columbia, Canada
- Listed height: 6 ft 3 in (1.91 m)
- Listed weight: 200 lb (91 kg)

Career information
- High school: Daniel McIntyre Collegiate Institute

Career history
- 1943: Winnipeg Blue Bombers
- 1946–1951: Calgary Stampeders

Awards and highlights
- Grey Cup champion (1948)

David Berry (December 11, 1921 – April 16, 2007) was a Canadian football player who played for the Calgary Stampeders and Winnipeg Blue Bombers. He won the Grey Cup with the Stampeders in 1948. Berry was born in Birkenhead, England and raised in Winnipeg, Manitoba. He was a veteran of World War II, serving in the Royal Canadian Air Force. He died in 2007.
