= Arthur Berry (cricketer) =

New Zealand cricketer

Personal information
- Full name: Arthur Ernest Berry
- Born: 18 September 1928; Dunedin, Otago, New Zealand
- Died: 19 December 2016 (aged 88); Timaru, Canterbury, New Zealand
- Batting: Right-handed
- Bowling: Right-arm medium

Domestic team information
- Years: Team
- 1955/56: Otago
- 1961/62–1968/69: North Otago
- Source: Cricinfo, 5 May 2016

Arthur Ernest Berry (18 September 1928 – 19 December 2016) was a New Zealand sportsman. He played four first-class cricket matches for Otago during the 1955–56 season and played against touring international rugby union sides.

Berry was born at Dunedin in 1928. He played Brabin Shield cricket for Otago during the 1940s before moving to North Otago where he played both cricket and rugby union. As a rugby player he played for a Combined Hanan Shield Districts side against the touring Australians in 1949 and for a North Otago and Mid Canterbury team against the British and Irish Lions in 1950.

After moving back to Dunedin in the 1950s, Berry played in all four of Otago's Plunket Shield matches during the 1955–56 season, scoring 100 runs and taking five wickets for the side. He captained Dunedin Cricket Club and coached Green Island rugby team. He moved to Papakaio in the early 1960s and played cricket for North Otago between 1961–62 and 1968–69, including in four Hawke Cup matches.

Berry died in Timaru in December 2016.
