= Judith Berry =

Canadian painter

- Born: 1961 (age 63–64); London, Ontario, Canada
- Known for: Painter
- Website: www.judithberry.com

Judith Berry (born 1961) is a Canadian painter.

== Life and work ==
Judith Berry was born in London, Ontario and raised in Saskatoon. She studied at the Nova Scotia College of Art and Design in Halifax and then attended the Banff School of Fine Arts. Berry resides in Montreal, Quebec. She was an active member of Montreal's Galerie Clark collective and has solo exhibitions in Ottawa, Montreal, Toronto, and Calgary and was included in numerous group exhibitions in Montreal, Quebec City, and elsewhere. In 2021, she had a show in Montreal at the McClure Gallery, Visual Arts Centre in which her paintings reconfigured landscape titled "Waiting for Spring". Judith Berry is represented by Galerie Art Mûr in Montreal.

== Collections ==
- Musée national des beaux-arts du Québec
- the City of Ottawa
- Canada Council Art Bank
