= George Packer Berry =

American physician

George Packer Berry (29 December 1898 – 5 October 1986) was an American physician and medical educator. He served as dean of Harvard Medical School for sixteen years and is credited with greatly modernizing that institution's medical education program.

== Early life and education ==
A native of Troy, New York, Berry was born in 1898 to George Titus Berry and his wife Carrie Electa Packer. He attended The Hill School, a boarding school in Pottstown, Pennsylvania. He completed his undergraduate education at Princeton University in 1921, before graduating with an MD from Johns Hopkins School of Medicine in 1925. He completed his internship at the Connecticut State Hospital for the Insane and his residency at Johns Hopkins Hospital.

== Medical career ==
From 1929 to 1932, Berry was a researcher at the Rockefeller Institute for Medical Research. In 1932, he was named a professor at the University of Rochester School of Medicine, where he later became head of the bacteriology department. During World War II, he worked with the U.S. government to study the medical aspects of the nuclear bomb; he was present for the Bikini Atoll nuclear test in 1946. From 1947 to 1949, he was the associate dean of the Rochester School.

== Harvard Medical School tenure ==
In 1949, Berry accepted an appointment as dean of Harvard Medical School, a position he held until 1965. His personal style as dean was described in a Harvard Crimson tribute by Andrew Weil:

"His contacts with students are minimal; his associations with Faculty men are often highly formal; and the great amount of time he spends away from the School is something of a standing joke."

Despite this remote style of administration, he was a highly effective dean who modernized the institution by merging the medical school with seven teaching hospitals, forming Harvard Medical Center,. completing plans for the Francis A. Countway Library of Medicine, and doubling the size of Harvard Medical School's endowment. and assisted in the establishment of the Channing Laboratory.

== Honors and awards ==
Berry was made a fellow of the American Academy of Arts and Sciences in 1950. He served as president of the American Association of Immunologists from 1939 to 1940 and of the Association of American Medical Colleges from 1951 to 1952. After leaving his position at Harvard in 1965, Berry moved to Princeton as a charter trustee and advisor to the biology department. He was also a trustee of the American University in Beirut.

== Personal life ==
Berry was married twice. He married his first wife, Elizabeth L'Estrange Duncan, in 1923, but she died from complications of measles three years later. He married Mariana Wilkinson in 1969.

Berry died at the age of 87 in Princeton, New Jersey.
