= William Berry (cricketer) =

English cricketer

Personal information
- Full name: William Ewart Berry
- Born: 12 October 1897; Bridgwater, Somerset, England
- Died: 24 April 1949 (aged 51); Bridgwater, Somerset, England

Domestic team information
- Years: Team
- 1926: Somerset
- Only FC: 26 May 1926 Somerset v Hampshire

Career statistics
Competition	First-class
Matches	1
Runs scored	1
Batting average	–
100s/50s	0/0
Top score	1*
Balls bowled	24
Wickets	0
Bowling average	–
5 wickets in innings	–
10 wickets in match	–
Best bowling	–
Catches/stumpings	0/–
- Source: CricketArchive, 20 August 2008

William Ewart Berry (12 October 1897 – 24 April 1949) was an English cricketer who played for Somerset in one match in 1926. Until the publication of a book on Somerset cricketers in 2017, Berry was believed to be "Wilfred Ernest Berry", born in Hertford on the same date and with an unknown date of death in 1951. He was in fact born in Bridgwater, Somerset, where he also died.

Berry made one first-class appearance for Somerset during the 1926 season, playing against Hampshire at the United Services Recreation Ground in Portsmouth. In the only innings in which he batted, as a tailender, he scored one run, and finished the innings not out. Berry bowled a total of four overs in the match, conceding 34 runs.

== Life and career ==
One of five sons of a Bridgwater grocer, Berry was educated at West Buckland School and followed his father into the grocery business. He played club cricket for Bridgwater Cricket Club as a "googly bowler". His twin brother John Henry Berry also played cricket for Bridgwater. A diabetic, he killed himself at his place of business in 1949 when facing a worsening of his condition.
