= Alf Berry =

English footballer

Personal information
- Full name: Alfred Berry
- Date of birth: 31 December 1883
- Place of birth: Bury, England
- Date of death: 1945 (aged 61–62)
- Position: Winger

Senior career*
Years	Team	Apps	(Gls)
1902–1903	Freetown		
1904–1905	Oldham Athletic		
1905–1906	Bury	3	(2)
1906–1910	Rossendale United	179	(40)
1910	Haslingden		
Total		3	(2)
- * Club domestic league appearances and goals

Alfred Berry (31 December 1883–1945) was an English footballer who played in the Football League for Bury.
