= George Berry (captain) =

George Berry (1706–1776) was a captain in the French and Indian War.

== Early years ==
He was born in Kittery, Massachusetts, and he married Elizabeth Frink in 1727. He had four sons (George, Josiah, Obadiah and Henry) and one daughter (Elizabeth).

== War record ==
Commission issued to George Berry of Falmouth, bearing date April 19, 1757. It was one of those roving commissions of which many were issued during the old French wars, so called, and set forth that:

"George Berry, gentleman, was constituted Captain of a scouting party of forty men, and to be employed in marching from New Boston to Kennebec River, on the back of the inhabitants, for their security and protection, for a term not to exceed three months from the first day of April inst., unless continued by a further order of the General Court."

Assisted in the erection of Fort Halifax on the Kennebec River, and his account for services rendered, is on file in the archives at Boston, Massachusetts.

== Other accomplishments ==
Berry was a shipwright and owned a ship yard at Back Cove, Falmouth, now Portland, Maine. He was also chairman of the Board of Selectmen in Falmouth, Maine (now Portland) in 1753 and 1754 when Stephen Longfellow was clerk.
