= David Berry (special effects artist) =

American special effects artist

- Other name: Dave Berry
- Occupation: Visual effects artist
- Years active: 1977-1985

David Berry is a special effects artist who won at the 58th Academy Awards in the category for Best Visual Effects for his work on the film Cocoon. His win was shared with Scott Farrar, Ralph McQuarrie and Ken Ralston.

== Selected filmography ==
- Star Wars (1977)
- The Empire Strikes Back (1980)
- Raiders of the Lost Ark (1981)
- E.T. the Extra-Terrestrial (1982)
- Star Trek II: The Wrath of Khan (1982)
- Return of the Jedi (1983)
- Indiana Jones and the Temple of Doom (1984)
- Star Trek III: The Search for Spock (1984)
- Cocoon (1985)
