= William Berry (pioneer) =

William Berry (c. 1605 or 1610 – June 28, 1654) was the first settler at Sandy Beach, Rye, New Hampshire.

== Early life ==
William Berry was born 1605 in Norfolk, England, the son of Johan and Susannah Berry. He was in service to Captain John Mason in 1631, when Mason sent 58 men and 22 women to the Piscataqua River in North America. Among them were William Berry, William Seavey, Francis Rand, and William or Anthony Brackett.

The following were returned as belonging to Sandy Beach in 1688: William Berry, John Berry, John Marden, John Foss 1st, John Foss Jr., John Odiorne, Anthony Brackett, Francis Rand, Thomas Rand, William Wallis, James Randall, William Seavie, James Berry, Samuel Ran, John Seavie, Anthony Libbie, and Joseph Berry. William also was sent to manage one of John Mason's plantations

== Adult life ==
William Berry married Jane Hermins (1614–1687) in 1636 in the town of Portsmouth, New Hampshire.

He became a freeman on 18 May 1642 in Newbury, Massachusetts, and is on the list of the first settlers of Newbury.

William Berry by wife Jane had John Berry (1637–1716) and Elizabeth Berry (born 1634)) in Portsmouth, New Hampshire, United States.

== Signer of Glebe Conveyance ==
Berry signed the Glebe Conveyance in 1640.

He received a lot "upon the neck of land on the south side of the Little River at Sandy Beach on January 31, 1648, that included the area where 'Locke's Neck' is located."

== Political life ==
Berry served as a Selectman of Strawbery Banke (which is now Portsmouth, New Hampshire) in 1646.
