= William Berry (journalist) =

New Zealand journalist and newspaper editor

William Berry (c.1835 – 2 October 1903) was a New Zealand journalist and newspaper editor. He was born in Edinburgh, Midlothian, Scotland on c.1835.

He was born to Margaret Garden and her husband William Berry. Around the year 1847, aged 12, he was apprenticed in the composing room of The Scotsman newspaper. There he gained experience in different aspects of journalism. On 5 July 1860, he married Henrietta Younger at Edinburgh.

In 1863, Berry was engaged by the Daily Southern Cross newspaper in Auckland, New Zealand, as a war correspondent. He arrived at Auckland on 26 January 1864. He later became a sub-editor on the Southern Cross. In 1868, he resigned from the Southern Cross. From 1868 until 1874, he was an editor of the Thames Advertiser. He moved to Auckland in 1875 as an editor of the New Zealand Herald and retained this position when it merged with the Southern Cross in 1877. In either 1902 or 1903, he was elected as the president of the New Zealand Institute of Journalists. He died on 2 October 1903. Henrietta died on 9 January 1918.
