= Keith Berry (musician) =

British composer

Keith Berry (born 1973) is a London-based musician and composer, often working in the field of minimalist and ambient music. He has released material on labels such as trente oiseaux, Crouton Music, Authorized Version, and Twenty Hertz. Berry claims to have been influenced by literary and philosophic sources, such as Aldous Huxley, Lao Tzu, Nietzsche, Wabi-Sabi, Zen, and the I Ching.

== Collaborative Recordings ==
- bleu : résultat [ chat blanc records ] CD 2006
- 58 Degrees North [ Iain Stewart, self-release ] DVD 2006

== Compilation Recordings ==
- Coincident [ Entr'acte ] CD 2006
- I, Mute Hummings [ ex ovo ] CD 2006
