= Dan McIntyre (musician) =

American jazz musician

Dan McIntyre is a jazz guitarist and composer from Chicago, Illinois.

McIntyre was born in Chicago's Northwest side. His early musical influences included guitarists Wes Montgomery, Herb Ellis, Joe Pass and Barney Kessell.

He has performed with Della Reese, Diahann Carroll and Vic Damone and toured North America and Europe with Frank Sinatra, Jr. in the 1970s and 1980s.

McIntyre has released a CD titled Hourglass on the Southport label.
