= William D. Berry (artist) =

William D. Berry or Bill Berry (May 20, 1926 – 1979) was an influential Alaskan artist known for his wildlife sketches, cartoons, and paintings.

== Life and work ==
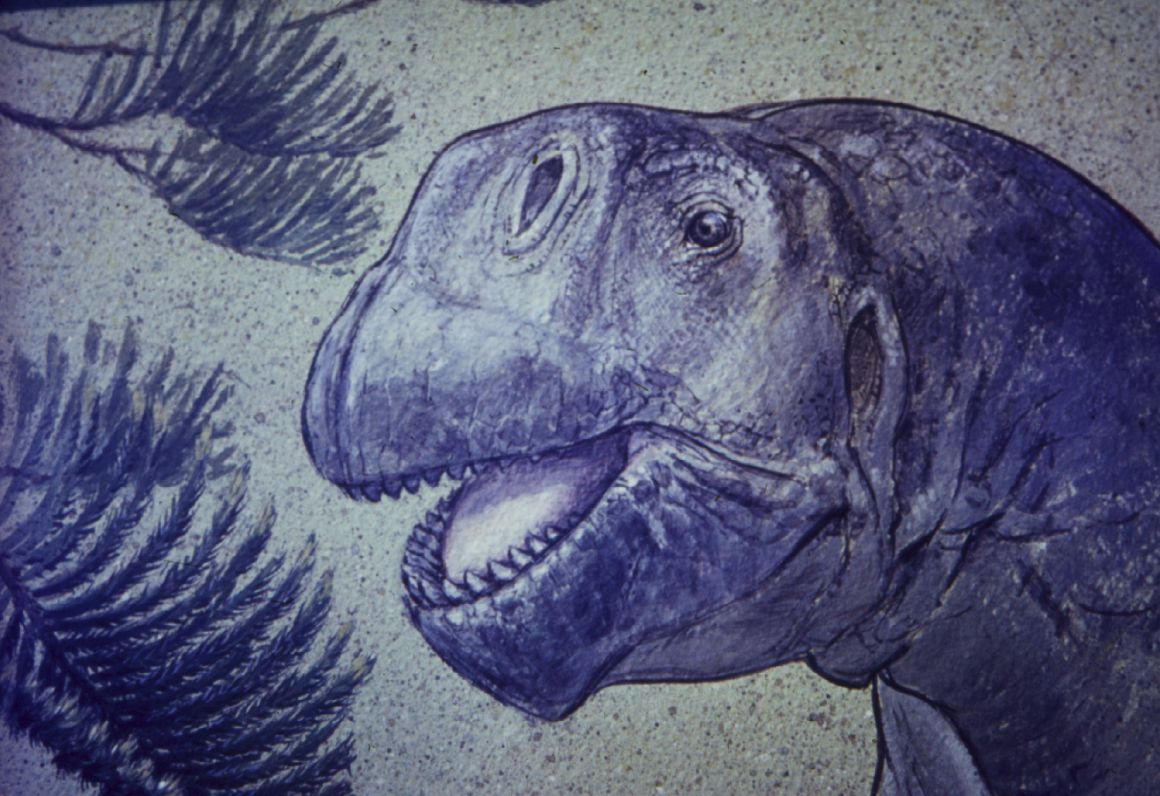
Life restoration of Camarasaurus by Berry

He was born May 20, 1926, in San Mateo, California. He met and married Elizabeth, and they had two sons, Mark (b. 1959) and Paul (b. 1962). The family moved to Fairbanks, Alaska in 1965.

One of his last works was a mural for the children's room in the Noel Wien Public Library in Fairbanks. He was shot and killed before he was able to complete the mural. His mural, "An Alaskan Fairytale," was completed by illustrator and Caldecott Medal winner Trina Schart Hyman.

== Bibliography ==
- Birds of Southern California, by George Wollet.
- Animal Friends of the Sierra, by Fran Hubbard. 1955. Awani Press.
- Animal Friends of the Northwest, by Fran Hubbard. 1957. Awani Press.
- How to Understand Animal Talk. 1958, by Vinson Brown.
- Mammals of Los Angeles County. 1959, by Charles A. McLaughlin.
- Ducks, Geese, and Swans. 1960, by Herbert H. Wong.
- Buffalo Land. 1961.
- Deneki: An Alaskan Moose. 1965.
- Animals of the North. 1966, by William O. Pruitt. (later republished as: Wild Harmony: The Cycle of Life in the Northern Forest)
- Mammals of the San Francisco Bay Area. (with Elizabeth Berry)
- Letters from Alaska: hazards and humor of life in suburbia, by Edith C. Rohde. 1979. That New Publishing Company (Illustrations and Dust jacket by Berry) ISBN 0918270049
- William D. Berry: 1954-1956 Alaskan Field Sketches. 1989. Compiled with commentary by Elizabeth Berry. University of Alaska Press. Paper ISBN 9780912006369 Cloth ISBN 9780912006345

== Sources ==
- Hill, Greg (November 7, 2005). "Find out about caterpillars at the library". Fairbanks Daily News-Miner.
- Amberlyn, J.C. "William D. Berry, Wildlife Artist". jcamberlyn.com.
- "William D. Berry 1954-1956 Alaskan Field Sketches". Book Detail. The University of Alaska Press.
