= Rachel Berry (legislator) =

American suffragist and politician (1859–1948)

Rachel Emma Berry
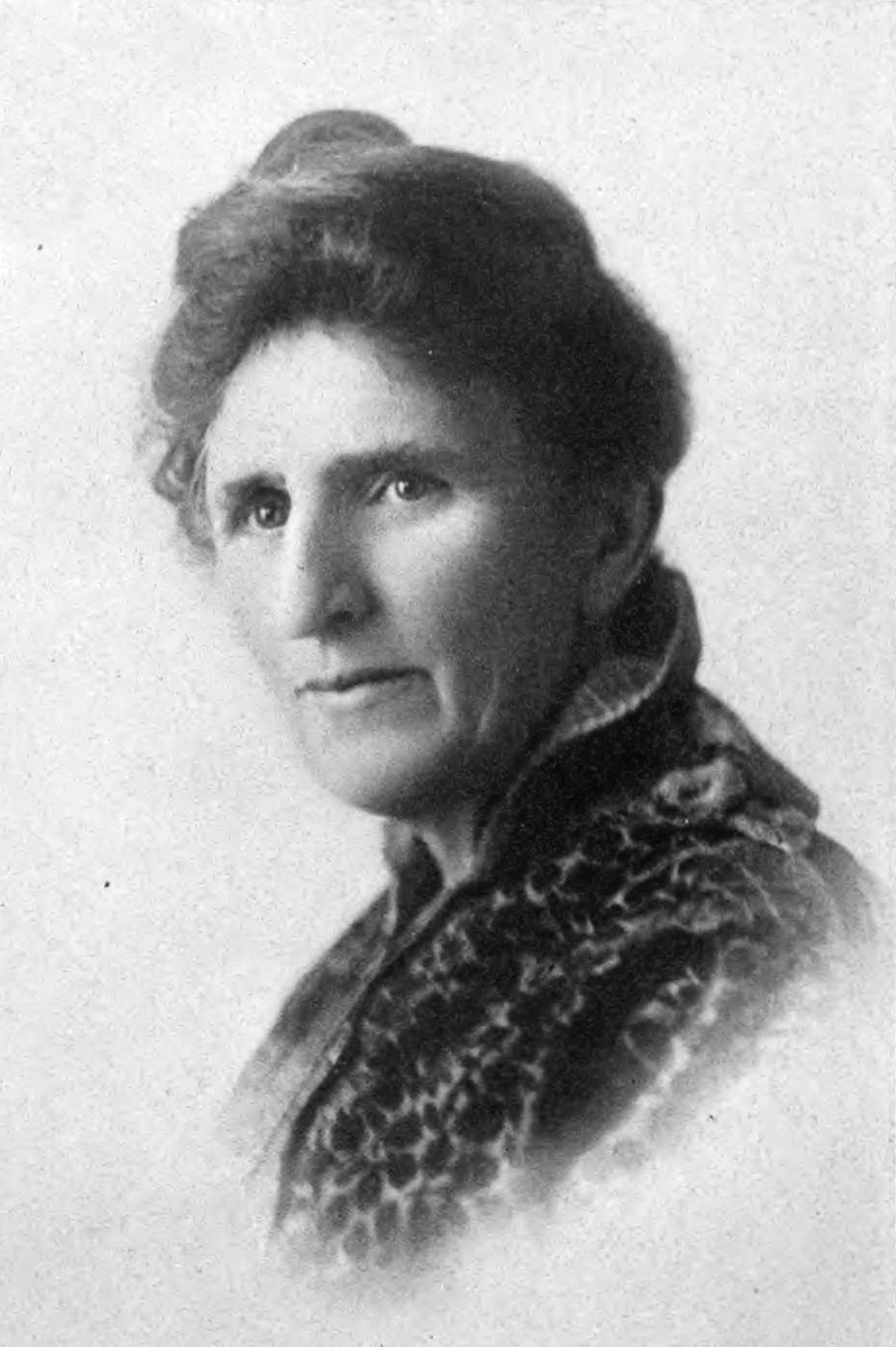

Member of the Arizona House of Representatives from the Apache County
- In office January 11, 1915 – January 8, 1917

Personal details
- Born: Rachel Emma Allen. March 11, 1859
- Died: November 25, 1948 (aged 89) Phoenix, Arizona
- Occupation: Politician

Rachel Emma Berry (née Allen) (March 11, 1859 – November 25, 1948) was an American suffragist and politician who in 1914 was elected to a seat in the Arizona House of Representatives to represent Apache County, Arizona.

== Family and early life ==
Rachel Allen was born in Ogden, Utah, on March 11, 1859. She grew up in Kanarraville, Utah, and taught school there. Rachel married William Berry in 1879. In the fall of 1881, Rachel and William left for Arizona with a group of 18 other members of the Church of Jesus Christ of Latter-day Saints by covered wagons. They arrived in St. Johns, Arizona, on January 27, 1882.

William Berry became a leading rancher and cattleman with the horses and herd of cattle he had brought from Utah. The Berrys had seven children, four daughters and three sons.

== Arizona legislator ==
In 1912, shortly after it became a state, Arizona gave women suffrage, so Arizona's women gained the right to vote eight years before universal suffrage occurred in the United States. Women in Arizona soon after ran for elected office. In 1914 Rachel Berry became one of the first women to win a seat in a State Legislature in the United States. Her two-year term representing Apache County began on January 11, 1915. During her one term in office, Berry focused on bills that were concerned with education and child welfare, and served as Chairwoman of the Good Roads Committee. She worked to adopt a bill for Arizona's current state flag.

== Public service ==
After she completed her term in the House of Representatives, Berry was appointed the chairman of the Apache County Child Welfare Board. She was president of the local Relief Society and the Mutual Improvement Association of her church. She was the trustee of the school in St. Johns.

== Death and legacy ==
Berry died at her home, in Phoenix, on Thanksgiving Day, 1948. She was inducted into the Arizona Women's Hall of Fame in 1984.
