= George Berry (American football) =

American football player (1900–1986)

Profile
- Position: Guard

Personal information
- Born: February 18, 1900; Milwaukee, Wisconsin
- Died: February 25, 1986 (aged 86); Half Moon Bay, California
- Listed height: 5 ft 11 in (1.80 m)
- Listed weight: 203 lb (92 kg)

Career information
- College: None

Career history
- Racine Legion (1922); Hammond Pros (1922–1924, 1926); Akron Pros/Indians (1924–1926)

Awards and highlights
- Collyers Eye Magazine 1st Team All-NFL (1924)

Career statistics
- Games played: 35
- Stats at Pro Football Reference

George Walton Berry (February 18, 1900 – February 25, 1986) was a guard in the National Football League. He split his first season between the Racine Legion and the Hammond Pros. He played another season with the Hammond Pros before splitting the 1924 NFL season with Hammond and the Akron Pros. Berry played another year in Akron, during which time the team changed their name to the Indians, before splitting his final season with Akron and the Hammond Pros.
