= George Ricker Berry =

Semitic scholar and archaeologist

- Born: October 15, 1865; West Sumner, Maine, US
- Died: May 24, 1945 (aged 79); Cambridge, Massachusetts, US
- Education: Colby University (1885); Newton Theological Institution; University of Chicago (1895); Colgate University
- Occupation: Bible scholar
- Known for: Interlinear Greek-English New Testament
- Spouse: Carrie Leola Clough (1877-1909)
- Children: Hilda Marion (1895-1974); Miriam Clough (1897-?); Lawrence Worthing (1903-1936)
- Parent(s): William Drake Berry; Joanna Floyd Lawrence

George Ricker Berry, D.D., Ph.D., (15 October 1865 – 24 May 1945) was an internationally known Semitic scholar and archaeologist, ordained Baptist minister, and Professor Emeritus of Colgate-Rochester Divinity School. The Interlinear Greek-English New Testament (the Englishman's Greek New Testament apparently created by Thomas Newberry), of which American editions are generally published with Berry's Lexicon and New Testament Synonyms, is a widely used Bible study aid.

== Family ==
George Ricker Berry was born 15 October 1865 to William Drake Berry and Joanna Floyd Lawrence in West Sumner, Maine, USA. He was the sixth of ten children. Berry married Carrie Leola Clough (1877 – 4 March 1909), in Liberty, Waldo, Maine, on 17 August 1893. They had three children, Hilda Marion Berry (17 March 1895 – April 1974), Miriam Clough (b. April 5, 1897), Lawrence Worthing (22 June 1903 – 30 July 1936). After Carrie died, he married Edith Van Wagner on July 1, 1913.

Berry died on Thursday, 24 May 1945, in Cambridge, Massachusetts – he was 79 years old.

== Education ==
Berry received his A.B. degree from Colby College in 1885, and graduated from Newton Theological Institution in 1889. He was one of the first students to attend the University of Chicago when the new school opened in 1892, where he studied Semitic languages. After earning his Ph.D. in 1895, he was an instructor there for a year. In 1896 he was appointed Instructor of Semitic Languages at Colgate University. When Assyriologist Nathaniel Schmidt left Colgate and went to Cornell that year, Berry continued Schmidt's history course. He was promoted to Professor in 1897 and in the following years expanded the Assyriological offerings at Colgate. Berry was a member of Delta Upsilon fraternity.

== Written works ==
- Book of Ruth in Encyclopedia Americana at WikiSource
- The Old Testament Among the Semitic Religions, 1910
- Old and New in Palestine, 1939
- A New Greek-English Lexicon to the New Testament, Hinds & Noble, 1897
- The interlinear literal translation of the Greek New Testament: with the Authorized version conveniently presented in the margins for ready reference and with the various readings of the editions of Elzevir 1624, Griesbach, Lachmann, Tischendorf, Tregelles, Alford and Wordsworth : to which has been added a new Greek-English New Testament lexicon, supplemented by a chapter elucidating the synonyms of the New Testament, with a complete index to the synonyms (Google eBook), Wilcox & Follett, 1897
- The letters of the Rm 2 collection in the British museum: with transliteration, notes and glossary ... (reprint ed.), The University of Chicago press, 1896
- Interlinear Hebrew-English Old Testament (Genesis - Exodus) (reprint ed.), Apocryphile Press, 2007, ISBN 978-1933993522
