= George J. Berry =

American businessman

George J. Berry (July 5, 1937 – September 7, 2019) was an American businessman who was Commissioner of Industry, Trade, and Tourism for the state of Georgia (1983–1990), Commissioner of Aviation for the City of Atlanta (1978–1983), and a senior vice president of Cousins Properties, one of Atlanta's largest property development firms (1990–2004). Berry also served as a member of the boards of directors for several major corporations and non-profit business development entities in the state of Georgia.

Berry's substantial contributions to Georgia's aviation and business communities are considered to be formidable. He was awarded the Chairman's Award by the Georgia Aviation Hall of Fame in 2003 for his role in managing and overseeing the construction of the terminals and runways of what is today known as Hartsfield-Jackson Atlanta International Airport, one of the busiest airport terminals in the world. Mr. Berry also served as chief administrative officer of the City of Atlanta during a critical time of transition for the city during the 1970s from its traditional "white rule" to a racially balanced governmental power structure. During the mayoral terms of Mayor Maynard Jackson, Berry worked closely with the city's "big mules" (consisting primarily of white business leaders) to facilitate a peaceful and progressive transition to a city government dominated primarily by African-American officials.

Berry graduated from Young Harris College in 1957 and returned to serve as a school Trustee for many years.

Upon retirement, Berry served on the boards of several organizations dedicated to advancing business interests throughout the state of Georgia. He died on September 7, 2019, at the age of 82.
