= Richard N. Berry =

American politician (1915–2018)

Member of the Maine House of Representatives
- In office 1960–1966
- Preceded by: Lester E. Brown
- Succeeded by: Richard Hewes

Member of the Maine Senate
- In office 1966–1976
- Preceded by: Mary E. Chisholm
- Succeeded by: Richard Hewes

Personal details
- Born: November 4, 1915 Malden, Massachusetts, U.S.
- Died: January 31, 2018 (aged 102) Scarborough, Maine, U.S.
- Party: Republican

Richard Nathaniel Berry (November 4, 1915 – January 31, 2018) was an American politician from Maine. Berry, a Republican, served in the Maine Legislature from 1960 to 1976. He spent 6 years in the Maine House of Representatives (1960-1966) and 10 years in the Maine Senate, including 4 years as Senate Majority Leader (1970-1974). In 1974, he sought the Senate Presidency but was unable to gain enough votes from his colleagues. He represented Cape Elizabeth, Maine in the House and Cape Elizabeth, South Portland and part of Scarborough while in the Senate. Berry was married to Sylvia Lehr, who died in December 2010. He died on January 31, 2018, at the age of 102.
