= William Berry (footballer, born 1934) =

English footballer

Personal information
- Full name: William Berry
- Date of birth: 4 April 1934 (age 92)
- Place of birth: Mansfield, England
- Position: Inside forward

Senior career*
Years	Team	Apps	(Gls)
1955	Langwith Colliery		
1956–1957	Mansfield Town	10	(1)
Total		10	(1)
- * Club domestic league appearances and goals

William Berry (born 4 April 1934) is an English former professional footballer who played in the Football League for Mansfield Town.
