= William D. Berry (political scientist) =

American political scientist

William Dale Berry is the Syde P. Deeb Eminent Scholar in Political Science and Marian D. Irish Professor of Political Science at Florida State University. His research analyzes the impact of electoral competition on the policy choices made by state legislators, and the effect of state welfare policy on poverty in the United States. Berry's research on methodology focuses on the development of techniques for estimating econometric models with binary dependent variables, and methods for studying policy diffusion using geographical information systems.

== Selected works ==
- Understanding Multivariate Research: A Primer for Beginning Social Scientists (with Mitchell S. Sanders), Westview Press (2000) ISBN 0-8133-9971-8
- Understanding United States Government Growth : An Empirical Analysis of the Postwar Era (with David Lowery), Praeger (1987) ISBN 0-275-92509-9
