= Rick Berry =

Canadian ice hockey player (born 1978)

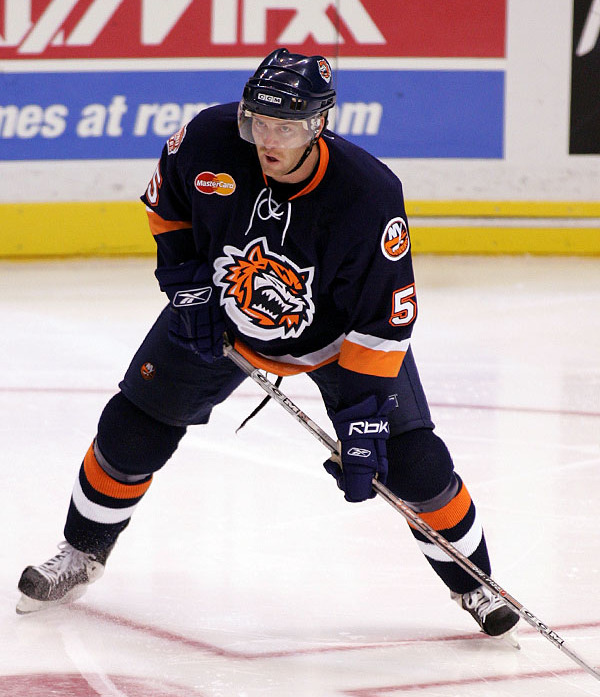
- Berry with the Bridgeport Sound Tigers in 2006
- Born: November 4, 1978 (age 47) Birtle, Manitoba, Canada
- Height: 6 ft 2 in (188 cm)
- Weight: 213 lb (97 kg; 15 st 3 lb)
- Position: Defense
- Shot: Left
- Played for: Colorado Avalanche; Pittsburgh Penguins; Washington Capitals; Füchse Duisburg
- NHL draft: 55th overall, 1997; Colorado Avalanche
- Playing career: 1998–2009

Richard Ernest Berry (born November 4, 1978) is a Canadian former ice hockey defenceman who played in the NHL with the Colorado Avalanche, Pittsburgh Penguins and the Washington Capitals. Berry now lives in Colorado and is a financial consultant.

== Playing career ==
Berry was drafted 55th overall in the 1997 NHL entry draft by the Colorado Avalanche. He played the majority of his first three pro seasons in the American Hockey League with the Hershey Bears. In his first full season with Colorado, he played 57 games before he was traded to the Pittsburgh Penguins on March 19, 2002 with Ville Nieminen for Darius Kasparaitis. He did not last long in Pittsburgh, as he was claimed by the Washington Capitals in the 2002 NHL Waiver Draft later that year.

In 2006, he signed with the New York Islanders as a free agent but never played for the team, instead suiting up for the Islanders affiliate Bridgeport Sound Tigers. In the 2007–08 season, unable to find an NHL team, Berry signed with the Springfield Falcons of the AHL.

In the 2008–09, his final season, Berry signed with German team, Füchse Duisburg of the Deutsche Eishockey Liga and scored 11 points in 47 games.

In 197 career NHL games, Berry scored 2 goals and 13 assists for 15 points, while accumulating 314 penalty minutes.

== Career statistics ==
| | | | Regular season | | | | | Playoffs |
| Season | Team | League | GP | G | A | Pts | PIM | GP | G | A | Pts | PIM |
|---|---|---|---|---|---|---|---|---|---|---|---|---|
| 1995–96 | Seattle Thunderbirds | WHL | 59 | 4 | 9 | 13 | 103 | 1 | 0 | 0 | 0 | 0 |
| 1996–97 | Seattle Thunderbirds | WHL | 72 | 12 | 21 | 33 | 125 | 15 | 3 | 7 | 10 | 23 |
| 1997–98 | Seattle Thunderbirds | WHL | 37 | 5 | 12 | 17 | 100 | — | — | — | — | — |
| 1997–98 | Spokane Chiefs | WHL | 22 | 4 | 9 | 13 | 31 | 17 | 1 | 4 | 5 | 26 |
| 1998–99 | Hershey Bears | AHL | 62 | 2 | 6 | 8 | 153 | — | — | — | — | — |
| 1999–00 | Hershey Bears | AHL | 64 | 9 | 16 | 25 | 148 | 13 | 2 | 3 | 5 | 24 |
| 2000–01 | Hershey Bears | AHL | 48 | 6 | 17 | 23 | 87 | 12 | 2 | 2 | 4 | 18 |
| 2000–01 | Colorado Avalanche | NHL | 19 | 0 | 4 | 4 | 38 | — | — | — | — | — |
| 2001–02 | Colorado Avalanche | NHL | 57 | 0 | 0 | 0 | 60 | — | — | — | — | — |
| 2001–02 | Pittsburgh Penguins | NHL | 13 | 0 | 2 | 2 | 21 | — | — | — | — | — |
| 2002–03 | Washington Capitals | NHL | 43 | 2 | 1 | 3 | 87 | — | — | — | — | — |
| 2003–04 | Portland Pirates | AHL | 10 | 2 | 1 | 3 | 12 | — | — | — | — | — |
| 2003–04 | Washington Capitals | NHL | 65 | 0 | 6 | 6 | 108 | — | — | — | — | — |
| 2004–05 | Utah Grizzlies | AHL | 45 | 2 | 6 | 8 | 83 | — | — | — | — | — |
| 2005–06 | San Antonio Rampage | AHL | 5 | 0 | 0 | 0 | 4 | — | — | — | — | — |
| 2005–06 | Milwaukee Admirals | AHL | 64 | 1 | 11 | 12 | 121 | 7 | 0 | 0 | 0 | 15 |
| 2006–07 | Bridgeport Sound Tigers | AHL | 76 | 3 | 15 | 18 | 155 | — | — | — | — | — |
| 2007–08 | Springfield Falcons | AHL | 54 | 2 | 8 | 10 | 77 | — | — | — | — | — |
| 2008–09 | Füchse Duisburg | DEL | 47 | 2 | 9 | 11 | 111 | — | — | — | — | — |
| NHL totals | | | 197 | 2 | 13 | 15 | 314 | — | — | — | — | — |
