= William Berry (artist) =

Self portrait of William Berry painted in 2004.

William Augustus Berry (born September 29, 1933, Jacksonville, Texas; died January 3, 2010, Columbia, Missouri) was an author, artist, and professor of art, known for his illustrations and colored pencil drawings.

== Professional career ==
Berry earned a BFA at the University of Texas, Austin in 1955 and an MFA from the University of Southern California in 1957. Subsequently, he worked as an illustrator and painter in New York City.

In 1968, Berry began teaching art at the University of Texas, Austin, where he became the first Art Director of Texas Monthly Magazine. While teaching at UT Austin, he wrote his seminal textbook: Drawing The Human Form, a book widely adopted by art departments across the country and cited as "excellent" by art historian Ernst Gombrich.

From 1974 to 1978, Berry taught graphic design and illustration at Boston University, School of Visual Arts. In 1978, he became Professor of Art at the University of Missouri in Columbia where he was given the Chancellor's Award for Outstanding Faculty Research and Creative Activity, 1983, and named a William H. Byler Distinguished Professor in 1989. He served as chair for the department from 1995 to 1999. The University of Missouri, in recognition of his scholarship and professional reputation, made him a Curators' Professor in 1991. He retired in 1999 as Curators' Professor of Art Emeritus, a title he held for life.

== Exhibitions and awards ==
Berry's artwork has been in over 500 exhibitions, in the U.S. and abroad, receiving over 100 awards and prizes. Among the galleries that showed his work are: the Galleria Schneider, Rome, Italy; the Muscarelle Museum of Art, Williamsburg, VA; United States Information Agency Gallery, Athens, Greece; Espace Reduit, Cassis, France; and the Charles Campbell Gallery, San Francisco.

Berry traveled throughout the Middle East from 1965 to 1966, sponsored by a Dorothy Thompson Fellowship, resulting in an exhibition of photographs, drawings, and paintings shown at various American colleges in 1967-68. These formed the basis of a number of his later political illustrations.

In 1990, Mid-America Arts Alliance and Exhibits USA, in partnership with the National Endowment for the Arts, sponsored a three-year traveling exhibition of 32 of Berry's large colored pencil drawings. In 2002, he received the CPSA Award for Exceptional Merit and CIPPY Trophy from the Colored Pencil Society of America.

Public collections owning his work include: the Boston Museum of Fine Arts; the Addison Gallery, Andover, MA; Smith College Museum of Art, Northampton, MA; the University of North Dakota, Grand Forks; the Hoyt Institute of Fine Arts, New Castle, PA; and the Hallmark Art Collection, Kansas City, MO.

== Published Illustrations ==
Publications of Berry's illustrations, in a wide variety of media and styles, have been featured in various periodicals, such as The Reporter, Harper's, The New Leader, Esquire, Holiday Magazine, and Newsweek.

Berry created covers for books published by Random House, Doubleday, Alfred A. Knopf, Charles Scribner's Sons, Time Inc., and others. Among the books illustrated by Berry are: On Firm Ice, Journey to the Arctic, Still Quiet on the Western Front, and Kennedy Without Tears.

Berry has twice been profiled in the American Artist Magazine and is listed in Who's Who in American Art.

== Art Residencies ==
Berry's honors include: fellowships and artist-in-residencies at the Altos de Chavon Foundation, Dominican Republic; the MacDowell Colony, Peterborough, NH; the Rockefeller Foundation, Villa Serbelloni, Bellagio, Italy; Lacoste School of the Arts, France; Montalvo Arts Center, Saratoga, CA; and the Camargo Foundation, Cassis, France.

During these residencies, Berry, utilizing colored pencils, a cross-hatching technique and limited palette, created a series of still-life drawings focusing on the effect of light on geometric solids, which he constructed from paper. Drawing the solids axonometrically in order to "distance the viewer", Berry introduced objects from everyday life such as knives, pencils, or fruit, into his compositions. Berry wrote that the "geometric solids represent an intrusion of the ideal form of a truly Platonic type into the real world of objects.... a visual event that I find poetic and intriguing. It is the underlying theme in many of my drawings and is intended to make a metaphysical statement."

== Late Work ==
Upon his retirement from teaching, Berry continued to be prolific - merging long-used techniques with new emphasis on combining computer-based images, photography, collage, and watercolor. His subject matter echoed earlier themes: still life, European architecture, political images, imaginary landscapes, and self-portraits, which number in the hundreds.

Berry's late works were executed in a loose style and expressive manner, which inadvertently document the progression of Parkinson's disease-related symptoms.

Artist's website: http://www.williamaberry.com
