= David Berry (educator) =

British academic and writer

David Berry (born 30 August 1960) is an academic and writer.

== Bibliography ==
=== As author ===
- Berry, David (2004). The Romanian mass media and cultural development. Aldershot, Hampshire, England Burlington, Vermont: Ashgate. ISBN 9780754610694.
- Berry, David (2008). Journalism, ethics and society. Farnham, England Burlington, Vermont: Ashgate. ISBN 9780754647805.
- Berry, David; Kamau, Caroline (2013). Public policy and media organizations. Farnham, Surrey, England Burlington, Vermont: Ashgate. ISBN 9781409402756.

=== As editor ===
- Berry, David (2000). Ethics and media culture: practices and representations. Oxford Boston: Focal Press. ISBN 9780240516035.
- Berry, David; Theobald, John (2006). Radical mass media criticism: a cultural genealogy. Montreal New York: Black Rose Books. ISBN 9781551642468.
- Berry, David (2011). Revisiting the Frankfurt School essays on culture, media and theory. Farnham Burlington, Vermont: Ashgate. ISBN 9781409411802.
- Berry, David; Bounds, P. (2016) British Marxism & Cultural Studies: Essays on a Living Tradition, Routledge: London.
- Berry, David (2017). Cultural Politics in an Age of Austerity. London: Routledge.
- Berry, David (2025) The Internet and Radical Voices of Dissent, CPI.
