= William Bury (Roundhead) =

- Born: 1600s
- Died: 1669

Sir William Bury (c. 1605–1669) fought for the Parliamentary causes during the English Civil War and was a colonel in the New Model Army during Interregnum. He was also a Member of the First Protectorate Parliament, and held various Commonwealth government offices. (Note: William Bury name is spelt William Berry in the record of his Royal knighthood. This has in the past led to confusion over whether they were one and the same man. The genealogist C.E. Gildersome-Dickinson researched the issue and concluded that they were, and that his son a barrister was never knighted.(Gildersome-Dickinson 1893, 8 Jul. p. 36; 9 Dec. p. 462))

== Biography ==
Bury was only son of William Bury (died 28 March 1617), of the Friars, in Grantham, Lincolnshire, and Emma, his wife, the youngest daughter of John Dryden, of Canons Ashby, and Elizabeth (née Cope). He was baptised at Grantham on 3 June 1605.

Bury entered at Gray's Inn on 18 May 1631. He was found guilty of High Treason for taking up arms against King Charles I, April 21, 1643 (see Declaration of Lex Talionis). The same year he had been appointed to collect subsidy from Lincolnshire, He was named in despatches of the Committee of Both Kingdoms 1644–1645, and was one of the commissioners for the reduction of Belvoir Castle in June 1649.

Bury was returned Member of Parliament for Grantham in First Protectorate Parliament (called 27 July 1654), and the same year was appointed a colonel in the New Model Army. The next year, on 1 November 1655, he was appointed to the Trade Committee, and on 1 August 1656 he was appointed a Commissioner for Ireland. While in Ireland he was knighted at Dublin Castle by Henry Cromwell on 21 July 1658. (this honour passed into oblivion with the Restoration in May 1660).

On 26 January 1661 (after the Restoration), was knighted at the hands of Sir Maurice Eustace, Lord Chancellor of Ireland, Roger, Earl of Orrery, and Charles, Earl of Mountrath, Lords Justices.

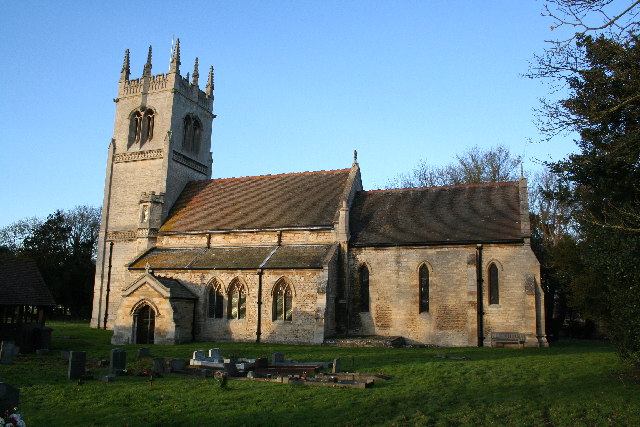
Blankney Church.

Sir William chiefly resided at Cistersia Place (also known as the Friars), in Grantham, until sent to Ireland, and on his return took up his abode at Linwood Grange, in Blankney. It was there he died and he was buried in Blankney Church on 20 July 1669. (Note: By will dated 8 February 1669, proved 10 November 1669 (P.C.C. 135, Cope), Sir William bequeathed certain bonds to his eldest son, William, mentioned his "cousin, William Ellis, Esq., of Gray's Inn," John Ascham (probably already his son-in-law), his youngest daughter, Elizabeth Bury, and appointed his youngest son, Thomas Bury, sole executor.)

== Family ==
At Grantham, on 13 April 1629 (while he was still a student), Bury married Jane (born 1616), daughter of Sir William Plomer, of Radwell, Hertfordshire, and Hill, Bedfordshire.

Bury married, secondly, around 1650, Jane, daughter and coheir of George Ellis, of Wyham-on-the-Hill, Lincolnshire, who survived him and was buried in Blankney Church on 22 April 1677.

Besides a number of children who died in infancy, Bury and Jane his first wife had two sons and three daughters:

1. William, who succeeded to the Grantham property and died 1678, was a barrister of Gray's Inn, but never a knight, although so styled upon the monument at Grantham. He married Dorothy, daughter of Periam Docwra, of Putteridge. William Bury's last male descendant died 1707. (Note: Sir William was not yet knighted at the birth of his eldest son or at the date of the latter's entry at Gray's Inn, although it would so appear from the registers of that society as printed by Mr. Foster. Le Neve, too, is in error in supposing Elizabeth, wife of Thomas Rokeby, to have been daughter of Robert Bury, and although almost every genealogist has followed him blindfold, there is proof that she was sister to Sir William. The pedigrees of this family given, in the Visitations of Rutland and Leicester, as printed by the Harleian Society, are, in fact, just one generation out in making Gilbert Bury, of Easton (not Eaton), a son of William and Edith, for the former and Robert were both older than William.)
2. John, of Hacketstown, County Carlow who married and had children.
3. Emma, who married her first cousin, William Rokeby, of Skellow, Yorkshire.
4. Mary, who married John Ascham, of Terrington St Clement, Norfolk.
5. Elizabeth, who was unmarried in February 1669.

Bury and Jane his second wife he had two sons:

1. Gilbert, who inherited the Linwood estate, entered Lincoln College, Oxford, at the age of thirteen, married at eighteen a lady then but sixteen, and with her were the ancestors of the Burys of Linwood (extinct in the male line 1799).
2. Sir Thomas Bury, Lord Chief Baron of the Exchequer, died unmarried, 1722.
