= Dean Zanuck =

American film producer

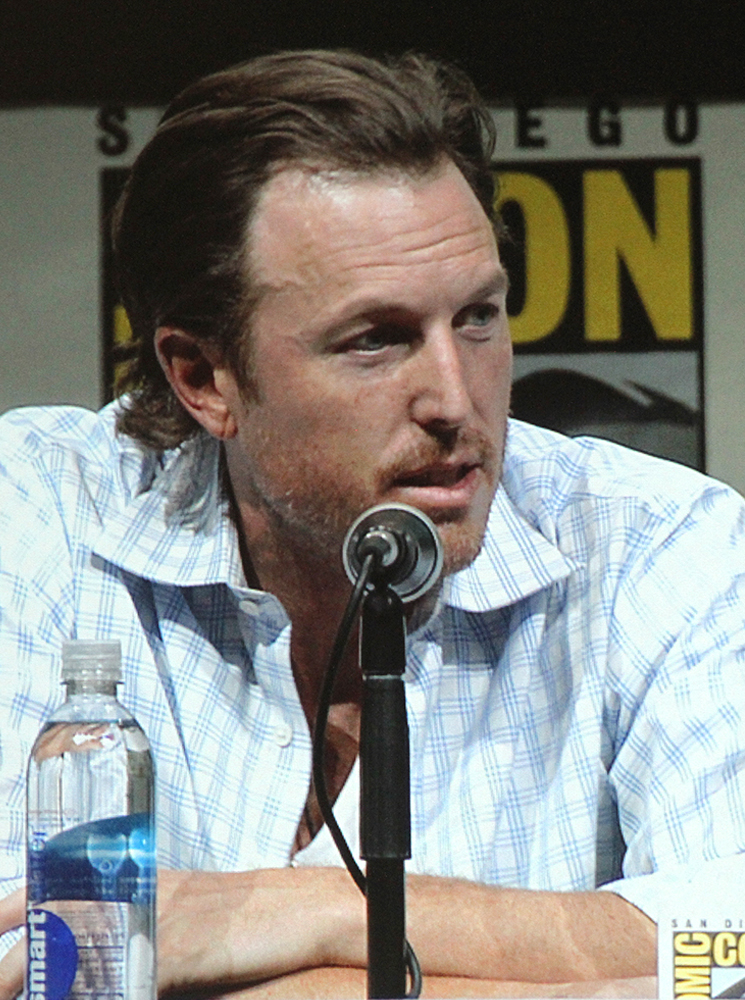
- Zanuck in 2013
- Born: Dean Francis Zanuck; August 11, 1972 (age 54); Los Angeles, California, U.S.
- Education: University of Colorado Boulder
- Occupations: Motion picture production executive and producer
- Years active: 1995–present
- Spouse: Marisa Zanuck (m. 2002; div . 2016)
- Children: 2
- Parents: Richard D. Zanuck; Linda Melson Harrison
- Relatives: Darryl F. Zanuck (grandfather); Virginia Fox (grandmother)

Dean Francis Zanuck (/ˈzænək/ ZAN-ək; born August 11, 1972) is an American production executive and film producer.

== Early life ==
Zanuck was born on August 11, 1972, in Los Angeles, California. His father was Richard D. Zanuck (1934–2012), a film producer, and his mother, Linda Melson Harrison, an actress. His paternal grandfather was Darryl F. Zanuck, film producer and 20th Century Fox co-founder; his paternal grandmother was silent actress Virginia Fox (1902–1982), Darryl Zanuck's wife for fifty-five years.

== Career ==
Zanuck was a production executive at The Zanuck Company from 1998 to 2017. In 2004, he formed Zanuck Independent to produce independent films. Productions under the banner include Sony Picture Classics' Get Low, starring Robert Duvall, Sissy Spacek, and Bill Murray, and the sci-fi fantasy, The Zero Theorem, directed by Terry Gilliam and starring Christoph Waltz, Matt Damon, and Tilda Swinton. In 2015, Dean Zanuck and Disney veteran Rick Calabash formed Zanuck Family Entertainment to produce family oriented motion pictures and multi-platform content.

== Personal life ==
In 2002, Zanuck married Marisa, a real estate agent who was featured on the reality TV series The Real Housewives of Beverly Hills in its third season, which aired in 2013. The Zanucks lived together in Beverly Hills, California, until their divorce in February 2016. They have one son, Jack, and a daughter, Darryl.

== Filmography ==
He was a producer in all films unless otherwise noted.

=== Film ===
Year	Film	Credit	Notes	Ref.
2002	Road to Perdition	Producer		
2002	Reign of Fire	Co-producer		
2009	Get Low	Producer		
2010	Tontine			
2013	The Zero Theorem	Producer		
2017	Voice from the Stone	Producer		
TBA	Namibia		Announced	
TBA	The Man Who Saved Paris		Announced	

Miscellaneous crew

Year	Film	Notes	Ref.
1995	Apollo 13	Office production assistant	
1995	Wild Bill	Production assistant	
1996	Mulholland Falls	Production office assistant	
1998	Deep Impact	Production executive	
1999	True Crime	Production executive	
2000	Rules of Engagement	Production executive	
2001	Planet of the Apes	Production executive	
2003	Big Fish	Production executive	
2005	Charlie and the Chocolate Factory	Production executive	
2007	Sweeney Todd: The Demon Barber of Fleet Street	Production executive	
2008	Yes Man	Production executive	
2010	Alice in Wonderland	Production executive	
2012	Dark Shadows	Production executive	

Thanks

Year	Film	Notes
2010	The Lost Tribe	Very special thanks

=== Television ===
Year	Title	Credit	Notes	Ref.
2004	Dead Lawyers	Executive producer	Television film	
