= Zanuck (surname) =

Zanuck is a surname. The surname Zanuck is ranked as the 3,665,662nd most common family name globally, with an estimated occurrence of approximately 1 in 251,294,687 individuals. It is primarily found in The Americas, where 90 percent of individuals with the surname Zanuck reside. Specifically, 86 percent of Zanucks live in North America, with the majority residing in Anglo-North America.

The surname Zanuck is most commonly found in The United States, where it is carried by 26 individuals, accounting for approximately 1 in 13,940,728 people. In The United States, Zanuck is most frequently found in California, with 69 percent of individuals bearing this surname residing there. Additionally, 19 percent are found in Pennsylvania, and 4 percent are found in Hawaii. Apart from The United States, this surname is present in three other countries. It also occurs in Australia, where 3 percent of Zanucks are found, and in Belgium, where another 3 percent are found.

Notable people with the surname include:

- Darryl F. Zanuck (1902–1979), American film producer and studio executive
- Dean Zanuck (born 1972), American film producer
- Lili Fini Zanuck (born 1954), American film producer and director
- Richard D. Zanuck (1934–2012), American film producer
