= The Zanuck Company =

American motion picture production company

- Formerly: The Zanuck/Brown Company (1972–1988)
- Type: Private
- Industry: Production company
- Founded: July 10, 1972; 54 years ago
- Founders: David Brown; Richard D. Zanuck
- Defunct: 2016; 10 years ago
- Headquarters: Beverly Hills, California, U.S.
- Key people: Lili Fini Zanuck (CEO)
- Products: Motion Pictures, New Media

The Zanuck Company (formerly The Zanuck/Brown Company) was an American motion picture production company that was active from July 10, 1972 to 2016. It is responsible for such blockbusters as Jaws, The Sting, Cocoon, Driving Miss Daisy, Road to Perdition, Charlie and the Chocolate Factory and Alice in Wonderland.

== History ==
=== The Zanuck/Brown Company ===
In 1972, after a successful partnership at both 20th Century Fox and Warner Bros., Richard D. Zanuck and David Brown, left to form their own production company, The Zanuck/Brown Company. Later that year, Zanuck/Brown signed a five-year production deal with Universal Pictures.

In 1974, Zanuck/Brown produced The Sting, starring Paul Newman, Robert Redford, and Robert Shaw. The film won seven Academy Awards, including Best Picture.

In 1975, Zanuck/Brown produced Jaws, directed by Steven Spielberg and starring Roy Scheider, Robert Shaw, and Richard Dreyfuss. The film, which won three Academy Awards, became the first summer blockbuster. It was number 1 at the box office for fourteen consecutive weeks and made history as the first motion picture to gross more than $100 million.

In 1979, Lili Fini Zanuck joined the company and was instrumental in developing many of its future film projects.

In 1980, The Zanuck/Brown Company moved to 20th Century-Fox where it produced The Verdict, starring Paul Newman and James Mason, followed by Cocoon, directed by Ron Howard and starring Hume Cronyn, Brian Dennehy, Steve Guttenberg, Jessica Tandy, and Linda Harrison. On April 20, 1983, after he spent three years working at 20th Century-Fox, feeling it was "unhappy" with the agreement, the duo had moved to Warner Bros., and the new Zanuck-Brown agreement enabled the organization to produce two and a half films per year and the team will go directly to then-Warner Bros. executive Robert A. Daley. After three years working at Warner Bros., the duo shifted ties to production studio Metro-Goldwyn-Mayer (MGM), for an overall production agreement whereas the upcoming Z/B projects gave them access to MGM's slate.

=== The Zanuck Company ===
In 1988, Zanuck and Brown broke their relationship, and Brown formed its own company The Manhattan Project. In 1988, Richard Zanuck partnered with producer/financier Jerry Perenchio and rebranded as The Zanuck Company.

In 1989, The Zanuck Company produced Warner Bros.' Driving Miss Daisy, starring Morgan Freeman, Jessica Tandy, and Dan Aykroyd. The film won four Academy Awards, including Best Picture.

In 1998, Dean Zanuck joined his father and became President of The Zanuck Company and they produced Paramount and DreamWorks' Deep Impact, starring Morgan Freeman, Robert Duvall, and Vanessa Redgrave. Other hits followed such as DreamWorks and 20th Century Fox's Road to Perdition, starring Paul Newman, Tom Hanks, and Daniel Craig, 20th Century Fox's Planet of the Apes, starring Mark Wahlberg, Tim Roth, and Helena Bonham Carter, and Columbia Pictures' Big Fish, starring Ewan McGregor, Albert Finney, and Jessica Lange, the latter two films being directed by Tim Burton.

Other productions by The Zanuck Company are Warner Bros.' Charlie and the Chocolate Factory, Sweeney Todd: The Demon Barber of Fleet Street (co-produced with DreamWorks), Dark Shadows, and Alice in Wonderland, all of which were directed by Tim Burton and star Johnny Depp.

In 2010, Alice in Wonderland became the first motion picture from The Zanuck Company to exceed $1 billion at the box office.

== Filmography ==
=== Theatrical films ===
==== 1970s ====
Release date	Title	Director	Distributor	Notes	Budget	Box office (worldwide)
July 18, 1973	Sssssss	Bernard L. Kowalski	Universal Pictures	first film	$1.03 million	$1 million
December 19, 1973	Willie Dynamite	Gilbert Moses	Universal Pictures		N/A	
December 25, 1973	The Sting	George Roy Hill	Universal Pictures	winner of the Academy Award for Best Picture; co-production with Bill/Phillips Productions; Inducted into the National Film Registry in 2005	$5.5 million	$159.6 million
March 30, 1974	The Sugarland Express	Steven Spielberg	Universal Pictures		$3 million	$12 million
May 17, 1974	The Black Windmill	Don Siegel	Universal Pictures	co-production with Siegel Films	$1.5 million	N/A
August 16, 1974	The Girl from Petrovka	Robert Ellis Miller	Universal Pictures		N/A	
May 21, 1975	The Eiger Sanction	Clint Eastwood	Universal Pictures	co-production with The Malpaso Company	$9 million	$14.2 million
June 20, 1975	Jaws	Steven Spielberg	Universal Pictures	Inducted into the National Film Registry in 2001	$9 million	$472 million
July 15, 1977	MacArthur	Joseph Sargent	Universal Pictures		$9 million	$16.3 million
June 16, 1978	Jaws 2	Jeannot Szwarc	Universal Pictures		$30 million	$208 million
June 16, 1978	The Shout	Jerzy Skolimowski	Rank Film Distributors	last film	Less than £500,000	£176,800

==== 1980s ====
Release date	Title	Director	Distributor	Notes	Budget	Box office (worldwide)
June 13, 1980	The Island	Michael Ritchie	Universal Pictures		$22 million	$15.7 million
December 18, 1981	Neighbors	John G. Avildsen	Columbia Pictures		$8.5 million	$29.9 million
December 8, 1982	The Verdict	Sidney Lumet	20th Century Fox		$16 million	$54 million
June 21, 1985	Cocoon	Ron Howard	20th Century Fox		$17.5 million	$85.3 million
November 8, 1985	Target	Arthur Penn	Warner Bros.	co-production with CBS Theatrical Films	$12.9 million	$9.02 million
November 23, 1988	Cocoon: The Return	Daniel Petrie	20th Century Fox	last film released under the Zanuck-Brown name	$17.5 million	$25 million
December 15, 1989	Driving Miss Daisy	Bruce Beresford	Warner Bros.	first film released under the name of The Zanuck Company; winner of the Academy Award for Best Picture	$7.5 million	$145.8 million

==== 1990s ====
Release date	Title	Director	Distributor	Notes	Budget	Box office (worldwide)
December 22, 1991	Rush	Lili Fini Zanuck	MGM/UA Distribution Co.	co-production with Metro-Goldwyn-Mayer	$17 million	$7.2 million
October 29, 1992	Rich in Love	Bruce Beresford	MGM/UA Distribution Co.	co-production with Metro-Goldwyn-Mayer	$18 million	$2.2 million
May 6, 1994	Clean Slate	Mick Jackson	MGM/UA Distribution Co.	co-production with Metro-Goldwyn-Mayer	N/A	$7.4 million
December 1, 1995	Wild Bill	Walter Hill	MGM/UA Distribution Co.	co-production with United Artists	$30 million	$2.1 million
April 26, 1996	Mulholland Falls	Lee Tamahori	MGM/UA Distribution Co.	co-production with Metro-Goldwyn-Mayer, PolyGram Filmed Entertainment and Largo Entertainment	$29 million	$11.5 million
August 2, 1996	Chain Reaction	Andrew Davis	20th Century Fox	co-production with Chicago Pacific Entertainment	$50 million	$60.2 million
May 8, 1998	Deep Impact	Mimi Leder	Paramount Pictures (North America); DreamWorks Pictures (International)	co-production with Amblin Entertainment and The Manhattan Project	$80 million	$349.5 million
March 19, 1999	True Crime	Clint Eastwood	Warner Bros.	co-production with Malpaso Productions	$55 million	$16.6 million

==== 2000s ====
Release date	Title	Director	Distributor	Notes	Budget	Box office (worldwide)
April 7, 2000	Rules of Engagement	William Friedkin	Paramount Pictures	co-production with Scott Rudin Productions and Seven Arts Pictures	$60 million	$71.7 million
July 27, 2001	Planet of the Apes	Tim Burton	20th Century Fox		$100 million	$362.2 million
July 12, 2002	Reign of Fire	Rob Bowman	Buena Vista Pictures	co-production with Touchstone Pictures and Spyglass Entertainment	$60 million	$82.2 million
July 12, 2002	Road to Perdition	Sam Mendes	DreamWorks Pictures (North America); 20th Century Fox (International)		$80 million	$181 million
December 10, 2003	Big Fish	Tim Burton	Sony Pictures Releasing	co-production with Columbia Pictures and The Jinks/Cohen Company	$70 million	$123.2 million
July 15, 2005	Charlie and the Chocolate Factory	Tim Burton	Warner Bros. Pictures	co-production with Plan B Entertainment and Village Roadshow Pictures	$150 million	$475 million
December 21, 2007	Sweeney Todd: The Demon Barber of Fleet Street	Tim Burton	Paramount Pictures (North America); Warner Bros. Pictures (International)	co-production with DreamWorks Pictures and Parkes/MacDonald Productions	$50 million	$153.4 million
December 19, 2008	Yes Man	Peyton Reed	Warner Bros. Pictures	co-production with Village Roadshow Pictures and Heyday Films	$70 million	$223.2 million

==== 2010s ====
Release date	Title	Director	Distributor	Notes	Budget	Box office (worldwide)
March 5, 2010	Alice in Wonderland	Tim Burton	Walt Disney Studios Motion Pictures	co-production with Walt Disney Pictures, Roth Films and Team Todd	$150–200 million	$1.025 billion
April 2, 2010	Clash of the Titans	Louis Leterrier	Warner Bros. Pictures	co-production with Legendary Pictures and Thunder Road Pictures	$125 million	$493.2 million
May 11, 2012	Dark Shadows	Tim Burton	Warner Bros. Pictures	co-production with Village Roadshow Pictures, Infinitum Nihil and GK Films	$150 million	$245.5 million
May 30, 2014	Maleficent	Robert Stromberg	Walt Disney Studios Motion Pictures	co-production with Walt Disney Pictures and Roth Films	$180–263 million	$758.5 million
September 15, 2015	Hidden	The Duffer Brothers	Warner Bros. Pictures	uncredited; co-production with Vertigo Entertainment; final film	N/A	$310,273

=== Television films/pilots ===
Release date	Title	Director	Network	Notes
July 9, 1987	Barrington	Richard Compton	CBS	as The Zanuck/Brown Company; co-production with New World Television
August 21, 1992	Driving Miss Daisy	Will Mackenzie	CBS	co-production with Warner Bros. Television
2004	Dead Lawyers	Paris Barclay	Sci-Fi	co-production with Sony Pictures Television
May 16, 2015	Bessie	Dee Rees	HBO	co-production with HBO Films and Flavor Unit Entertainment
June 8, 2018	Eric Clapton: Life in 12 Bars	Lili Fini Zanuck	Showtime	co-production with Passion Pictures
