= Eric Clapton: Life in 12 Bars =

2017 documentary film directed by Lili Fini Zanuck

- Film poster
- Directed by: Lili Fini Zanuck
- Written by: Stephen 'Scooter' Weintraub; Larry Yelen
- Produced by: John Battsek; Stephen 'Scooter' Weintraub; Larry Yelen; Lili Fini Zanuck
- Music by: Gustavo Santaolalla
- Production companies: Passion Pictures; The Zanuck Company
- Distributed by: Showtime Documentary Films
- Release date: 8 September 2017 (Toronto International Film Festival)
- Running time: 135 minutes
- Country: United States
- Language: English

Eric Clapton: Life in 12 Bars is a 2017 documentary film about Eric Clapton, directed and co-produced by Lili Fini Zanuck. The film covers Clapton's early childhood, including the trauma of his mother leaving him to be raised by his grandparents, and his career, consisting of "a single-minded mission to raise the profile of the blues in popular culture". Clapton's tragedies, including his infatuation with Pattie Boyd, then the wife of his best friend George Harrison, his struggles with drugs and alcoholism, and the death of his 4-year-old son Conor are highlighted.

Clapton and Zanuck previously worked together on the 1991 film Rush.

The film was released on home video on June 8, 2018.

== Reception ==
Dennis Harvey found the archive footage "diverse and absorbing", with "the assembly well paced", but was critical of the film's minimal coverage of Clapton's solo career.

The Hollywood Reporter, in a negative review of the film, found it "weirdly assembled, with counterintuitive emphases". The review also criticized the reliance on voiceover instead of on-camera appearances for interviewees, including Clapton himself.

== Soundtrack ==
A soundtrack of the film was released on June 8, 2018. It includes five previously unreleased tracks.
