= Cocoon: The Return =

1988 film by Daniel Petrie

- Theatrical release poster by John Alvin
- Directed by: Daniel Petrie
- Written by: Stephen McPherson
- Produced by: Richard D. Zanuck; David Brown; Lili Fini Zanuck
- Starring: Don Ameche; Wilford Brimley; Courteney Cox; Hume Cronyn; Jack Gilford; Steve Guttenberg; Barret Oliver; Maureen Stapleton; Elaine Stritch; Jessica Tandy; Gwen Verdon; Tahnee Welch
- Cinematography: Tak Fujimoto
- Edited by: Mark Warner
- Music by: James Horner
- Production company: Zanuck/Brown Company
- Distributed by: 20th Century Fox
- Release date: November 23, 1988
- Running time: 116 minutes
- Country: United States
- Language: English
- Budget: $17.5 million
- Box office: $25,024,919

Cocoon: The Return is a 1988 American science fiction comedy-drama film directed by Daniel Petrie and written by Stephen McPherson. The film serves as the sequel to the 1985 film Cocoon. All of the starring actors from the first film reprised their roles in this film, although Brian Dennehy only appears in one scene at the end of the film. Cocoon: The Return was released by 20th Century Fox on November 23, 1988. Unlike its predecessor, the film was neither a commercial nor a critical success.

== Plot ==
Five years after they left Earth following a failed rescue mission, the Antareans return to rescue the cocoons that were left behind. Before they can be retrieved, one of the cocoons is discovered by a science research team and taken to a secure laboratory for testing. The aliens and their human allies must find a way to retrieve the cocoon in time for their rendezvous with the rescue ship, while the humans traveling with them must decide whether to return to Antarea or stay on Earth and become mortal again.

Joe Finley learns that his leukemia has returned, but he knows it will be cured again as soon as he and Alma leave Earth. When Alma is hit by a car while saving a child, Joe gives up the last of his life force, saving her life but sacrificing his. Before dying, he tells Alma to accept a job offer at a preschool and that he loves her. Art and Bess Selwyn learn that Bess is pregnant and decide to raise the child on Antarea so they will live long enough to see him grow up. Ben and Mary Luckett reconnect with their family and friends, including Bernie Lefkowitz who is shown to have found love with Ruby Feinberg, alleviating his suicidal depression over Rose's death. Although a lovelorn Jack Bonner once again attempts to woo Kitty, she instead grants him a vision of his future, showing him children and a wife with a small heart-shaped birthmark on her neck.

The next night, before Ben, Mary, Art, and Bess leave to meet the Antareans, Alma tells them she is staying on Earth to work at the preschool. Art, Kitty, Ben, and his grandson David then rescue the Antarean from the Oceanographic Institute. Sara, one of the scientists working at the institute, becomes aware of the company's plans to hand the alien over to the military. Unhappy about this, she allows them to escape when she discovers the rescuers.

After the four get the Antarean on Jack's boat out at sea, Ben makes it known to his friends that he and Mary are staying on Earth as well, since family is more important than living forever and that they should not outlive their children. When the spaceship arrives, they are met by Walter before the Antareans, Art, Bess, and the cocoons left behind from the previous trip are brought aboard the space ship which departs for their homeworld.

Back at the port after he has said his goodbyes to Ben, Mary, and David, Jack is approached by Sara asking if he knows a place where she could get some gas. They walk and talk for a bit, and Sara tells him she just quit her job. He eventually notices the small heart-shaped birthmark on her neck.

== Cast ==
- Don Ameche as Art Selwyn
- Wilford Brimley as Ben Luckett
- Courteney Cox as Sara
- Hume Cronyn as Joe Finley
- Jack Gilford as Bernie Lefkowitz
- Steve Guttenberg as Jack Bonner
- Barret Oliver as David
- Maureen Stapleton as Mary Luckett
- Jessica Tandy as Alma Finley
- Gwen Verdon as Bess McCarthy-Selwyn
- Tahnee Welch as Kitty
- Elaine Stritch as Ruby Feinberg
- Linda Harrison as Susan
- Tyrone Power Jr. as Pillsbury
- Mike Nomad as Doc
- Herta Ware (cameo) as Rose Lefkowitz
- Brian Dennehy (cameo) as Walter.

== Production ==
Following the box office success of Cocoon, 20th Century Studios decided to exercise their sequel option and intended to move forward with a follow-up film even if Richard D. Zanuck declined to return. Despite both films costing the same amount, most of the budget for the first Cocoon was dedicated to special effects with the actors being relatively inexpensive, while Cocoon: The Return saw the cast's salaries increase significantly with the cost of special effects reduced due to Industrial Light & Magic being able to build upon and revisit what they had already developed for the first film.

Brian Dennehy was unable to reprise his role due to his commitment to a stage production of The Cherry Orchard in New York City, but was able to appear in a reduced capacity and flew to Florida for a few days of filming following by some additional shooting in Los Angeles after production had wrapped and he was bluescreened into necessary scenes. He accepted no salary and appeared only as a favor to his castmates from the first film.

David Saperstein, who wrote the original story for the first Cocoon, wrote a treatment for a sequel that Fox rejected leading to Saperstein publishing his sequel as a book titled Metamorphosis: the Cocoon Story Continues. The producers had wanted Ron Howard to return to direct, but due to his commitments to Willow, Howard could not return with producers hiring Daniel Petrie to direct as they felt he could bring the same humanity and humor that Howard brought to the predecessor. Replacing Saperstein, who according to Zanuck was not offered the opportunity to work on the sequel, were Stephen McPherson and Elizabeth Bradley who had previously been best known as writers and producers for MTM Enterprises.

== Music ==
Cocoon: The Return

Film score by James Horner
- Released: 23 November 1988
- Recorded: 1988
- Genre: Soundtrack
- Length: 53:26
- Label: Varèse Sarabande

The film score was composed and conducted by James Horner, who had previously scored the first film, and performed by the Hollywood Studio Symphony. The score mostly consisted of recycled themes and material from the first film. The soundtrack was released on 23 November 1988 through Varèse Sarabande and features nine tracks of score at a running time of just over fifty-three minutes. Filmtracks.com gave the album two out of five stars.

== Reception ==
The film had a generally negative reception. Roger Ebert of the Chicago Sun-Times gave the film two and a half out of four stars: "Yes, the performances are wonderful, and, yes, it's great to see these characters back again. But that's about it. For someone who has seen Cocoon, the sequel gives you the opportunity to see everybody saying goodbye for the second time". On Rotten Tomatoes, a review aggregator, the film has an approval rating of 31% based on 13 reviews; the average rating is 4.50/10. On Metacritic, the film has a score of 45 out of 100 based on 13 critics, indicating "mixed or average" reviews. Audiences polled by CinemaScore gave the film an average grade of "B+" on an A+ to F scale.

The film brought in $25 million worldwide, far less than the first film's $85 million worldwide gross.

Then-U.S. President Ronald Reagan viewed this film at Camp David on November 12, 1988.

== Awards and nominations ==
Year	Award ceremony	Category	Nominee	Result
1990	Academy of Science Fiction, Fantasy & Horror Films	Best Science Fiction Film		Nominated
1990	Academy of Science Fiction, Fantasy & Horror Films	Best Actor	Hume Cronyn	Nominated
1990	Academy of Science Fiction, Fantasy & Horror Films	Best Actress	Jessica Tandy	Nominated
1990	Academy of Science Fiction, Fantasy & Horror Films	Best Supporting Actor	Jack Gilford	Nominated
