= Mark Warner (film editor) =

American film editor (born 1954)

- Born: Mark Roy Warner; February 24, 1954 (age 72)
- Occupation: film editor
- Years active: 1978–present

Mark Warner (born February 24, 1954) is an American film editor who was nominated at the 1989 Academy Awards for Best Film Editing for the film Driving Miss Daisy. He has done over 30 films since 1978. In addition, he was nominated for an Emmy with Edward Warschilka for And Starring Pancho Villa as Himself in the category Outstanding Single-Camera Picture Editing for a Miniseries, Movie or a Special. He often works with director Bruce Beresford (see List of film director and editor collaborations).

== Filmography ==
Editor
Year	Film	Director	Notes
1982	Rocky III	Sylvester Stallone	First collaboration with Sylvester Stallone
1982	48 Hrs.	Walter Hill	
1983	Staying Alive	Sylvester Stallone	Second collaboration with Sylvester Stallone
1984	A Soldier's Story	Norman Jewison	
1985	Weird Science	John Hughes	
1986	Big Trouble in Little China	John Carpenter	
1987	The Running Man	Paul Michael Glaser	Credited as Mark Roy Warner
1988	Cocoon: The Return	Daniel Petrie	Credited as Mark Roy Warner
1989	Driving Miss Daisy	Bruce Beresford	First collaboration with Bruce Beresford
1990	Pacific Heights	John Schlesinger	
1991	Rush	Lili Fini Zanuck	
1992	Rich in Love	Bruce Beresford	Second collaboration with Bruce Beresford
1992	Leap of Faith	Richard Pearce	First collaboration with Richard Pearce
1994	Intersection	Mark Rydell	
1995	Dolores Claiborne	Taylor Hackford	First collaboration with Taylor Hackford
1996	A Family Thing	Richard Pearce	Second collaboration with Richard Pearce
1996	The Chamber	James Foley	
1997	The Devil's Advocate	Taylor Hackford	Second collaboration with Taylor Hackford
1999	Double Jeopardy	Bruce Beresford	Third collaboration with Bruce Beresford
2001	Monkeybone	Henry Selick	
2001	Lara Croft: Tomb Raider	Simon West	
2002	Abandon	Stephen Gaghan	
2004	Anacondas: The Hunt for the Blood Orchid	Dwight H. Little	
2006	Like Minds	Gregory J. Read	
2006	The Contract	Bruce Beresford	Fifth collaboration with Bruce Beresford
2007	The Water Horse: Legend of the Deep	Jay Russell	
2009	Mao's Last Dancer	Bruce Beresford	Sixth collaboration with Bruce Beresford
2010	Matching Jack	Nadia Tass	
2011	Sanctum	Alister Grierson	First collaboration with Alister Grierson
2012	Careless Love	John Duigan	
2013	Parker	Taylor Hackford	Fourth collaboration with Taylor Hackford
2013	Goddess	Mark Lamprell	
2016	The Comedian	Taylor Hackford	Fifth collaboration with Taylor Hackford
2018	Ladies in Black	Bruce Beresford	Seventh collaboration with Bruce Beresford
2018	Tiger	Alister Grierson	Second collaboration with Alister Grierson
2020	June Again	JJ Winlove	
2022	Here Be Dragons	Alastair Newton Brown	
2022	A Perfect Pairing	Stuart McDonald	
2022	Mother Mountain	Celina Stang	
2024	Five Blind Dates	Shawn Seet	
2025	The Travellers	Bruce Beresford	Eighth collaboration with Bruce Beresford

Editorial department
Year	Film	Director	Role	Notes
1978	Coming Home	Hal Ashby	Assistant editor	First collaboration with Hal Ashby
1979	Being There	Hal Ashby	Assistant editor	Second collaboration with Hal Ashby
1980	Raging Bull	Martin Scorsese	Associate editor	
2000	Proof of Life	Taylor Hackford	Post-production editorial	Third collaboration with Taylor Hackford
2004	Anacondas: The Hunt for the Blood Orchid	Dwight H. Little	Additional editor	
2009	Accidents Happen	Andrew Lancaster	Additional editor	
2018	Tiger	Alister Grierson	Editorial consultant	
2025	Not Without Hope	Joe Carnahan	Additional editor	

TV movies

Editor
Year	Film	Director	Notes
1998	Thicker Than Blood	Richard Pearce	Third collaboration with Richard Pearce
2003	And Starring Pancho Villa as Himself	Bruce Beresford	Fourth collaboration with Bruce Beresford

TV series

Editor
Year	Title	Notes
1982−83	Sesame Street	19 episodes
2019	Reef Break	1 episode
2019	The Commons	1 episode
2024	Human Error	1 episode
2024	Return to Paradise	3 episodes
