= Bessie (film) =

American 2015 TV film

- Promotional poster
- Genre: Biographical
- Screenplay by: Dee Rees; Christopher Cleveland; Bettina Gilois
- Story by: Dee Rees; Horton Foote
- Directed by: Dee Rees
- Starring: Queen Latifah; Michael Kenneth Williams; Khandi Alexander; Mike Epps; Tory Kittles; Tika Sumpter; Oliver Platt; Bryan Greenberg; Charles S. Dutton; Mo'Nique
- Theme music composer: Rachel Portman
- Country of origin: United States

Production
- Executive producers: Richard D. Zanuck; Queen Latifah; Randi Michel; Lili Fini Zanuck; Shakim Compere; Shelby Stone
- Producer: Ron Schmidt
- Cinematography: Jeff Jur
- Editor: Brian A. Kates
- Running time: 115 minutes
- Production companies: HBO Films; Flavor Unit Entertainment; The Zanuck Company

Original release
- Network: HBO
- Release: May 16, 2015

Bessie is a 2015 HBO TV film about the American blues singer Bessie Smith, and focuses on her transformation as a struggling young singer into "The Empress of the Blues". The film is directed by Dee Rees, with a screenplay by Rees, Christopher Cleveland and Bettina Gilois. Queen Latifah stars as Bessie Smith, and supporting roles are played by Michael Kenneth Williams as Smith's first husband Jack Gee, and Mo'Nique as Ma Rainey. The film premiered on May 16, 2015. By the following year Bessie was the most watched HBO original film in the network's history. The film was well received critically and received four Primetime Emmy Awards, winning for Outstanding Television Movie.

== Historical context ==
The blues era started to gain popularity in the 20th century, evolving from African Americans singing songs. The blues were inspired by folk songs sung at work. Ma Rainey is known as the mother of Blues, who began her career in vaudeville and minstrel shows. Bessie Smith was introduced to Ma Rainey when she joined the tour. The film highlights the economic context of the time, focusing on the vaudeville circuit. The circuit coined the term TOBA, which stands for Tough On Black Asses. Historically, it was hard for these women to get jobs outside vaudeville because other companies preferred lighter-skinned workers. Bessie Smith would perform for both races, white and black people. But as seen through the film, Bessie cherished her time performing for her own people. At a time when the country was struggling through the Great Depression and the civil rights movement, the film highlights Bessise smith's emotions throughout. The sense that Bessie was beloved on stage yet lonely at home. The feeling that she was empty yet filled. Ultimately, this led Bessie to fight for feminism and injustice.

== Synopsis ==
Bessie Smith (Queen Latifah) is a young singer from Chattanooga, Tennessee. She and her siblings are orphaned when their parents, William and Laura, die, leaving their oldest sister, Viola (Khandi Alexander), to raise them. Viola is abusive and vicious and Bessie's childhood is unhappy. She along with her brother Clarence (Tory Kittles) scrape by working for local vaudeville shows. Her stage ambitions are frustrated by producers unwilling to feature dark-skinned Black women in their shows. Bessie sneaks onto traveling performer Ma Rainey's (Mo'Nique) train compartment and asks to join her show. Ma Rainey takes Bessie under her wing and helps her develop her abilities until Bessie's popularity causes a schism between the two women. Bessie leaves with Clarence to start her own show.

In addition to her lover Lucille (Tika Sumpter), Bessie begins a tumultuous relationship with Jack Gee (Michael K. Williams), a security guard who later becomes her husband and manager. After a humiliating rejection from the newly formed Black Swan Records, Jack manages to get Bessie a record deal with Columbia Records. Immense success follows, though Bessie encounters difficulties, including a stabbing attack after a show in her hometown, racism from white guests during an affluent party, and an attack during her show by the Ku Klux Klan, whom she courageously chases off. Eventually, Bessie reconciles with Viola, and moves her and all of her siblings into a mansion to live with her. The move causes additional tension with Jack, and Bessie pushes him further by adopting a young boy, whom she names Jack Jr., as their son. Eventually, Lucille leaves Bessie. Despite her own affair with bootlegger Richard Morgan (Mike Epps), Bessie is infuriated upon discovering that Jack is bankrolling his mistress, up and coming performer Gertrude Saunders. After a violent quarrel, Jack leaves her. Bessie spirals into depression and alcohol. Jack returns, kidnapping Jack Jr. with the assistance of Viola, and takes him to live with him, contending that Bessie is an unfit mother.

During the Great Depression, Bessie's fortune evaporates, forcing her and Clarence to move into a small apartment. Bessie reconciles with Ma Rainey and takes some time to recuperate from her personal losses. Eventually, she accepts Richard's love for her and the two begin a relationship. After hearing Lucille Bogan's licentious hit song "Til the Cows Come Home", Bessie performs once again and meets a young John Hammond in 1932 who wishes to produce her comeback tour. Bessie's comeback is a success and she later reflects on her life while discussing the future with Richard.

== Cast ==
- Queen Latifah as Bessie Smith
- Michael K. Williams as Jack Gee, Bessie's husband
- Khandi Alexander as Viola Smith, Bessie's older sister
- Mo'Nique as Gertrude "Ma" Rainey
- Mike Epps as Richard Morgan, a romantic interest of Bessie's and later, her lifetime companion
- Tory Kittles as Clarence Smith, Bessie's older brother
- Tika Sumpter as Lucille, a romantic interest of Bessie's, a fictional character who is likely a composite of several of Smith's real life female companions and lovers
- Oliver Platt as Carl Van Vechten, artistic photographer
- Bryan Greenberg as John Hammond, record producer and critic
- Charles S. Dutton as William "Pa" Rainey
- Joe Knezevich as Frank Walker
- Jeremie Harris as Langston Hughes
- Chantelle Rose as Gertrude Saunders

== Production ==
A first draft screenplay was written by playwright Horton Foote at a time when Columbia Pictures was slated to produce the film, but the project died when the studio became involved in a financial irregularity that threatened its existence. Mr. Foote purchased his screenplay back from Columbia and acquired the film rights from biographer Chris Albertson. In the early 1990s, when the possibility of producers Richard D. Zanuck and Lili Fini Zanuck taking over the project arose, Albertson suggested Queen Latifah for the lead, but the project lay dormant when financing could not be found. Upon Horton Foote's death in 2009, the script and film rights became the property of his daughter, actress Hallie Foote, who took it to the Zanucks and HBO. Thus, press releases claim that Bessie has been "22 years in the making." The successful production of the film was also largely due to the executive producer team that was hailed for its elite lineup. The team included multiple industry legends, including Producer and talent manager Shakim Compere, who received his first Emmy in what his colleagues have noted as an "extremely well deserved" accolade. Compere is known for being a close and vital part of Latifah's success and her management team. The executive producer team also included Randi Michel who was praised by much of the production staff and talent as being "the key playmaker" in bringing the film onto its feet. As part of the HBO deal, Queen Latifah is credited as one of the executive producers alongside her managers Shakim Compere, and Randi Michel. The project was filmed in Atlanta, Georgia.

An early article announcing the HBO film indicated it would be based on Bessie, a 1972 biography by Chris Albertson, but a year later the book was not included in the film's credits or promotion, nor did the result bear but a peripheral resemblance to Albertson's book. An HBO interview with director and screenwriter Dee Rees inquired which books were most influential to her research. Rees replied, "Blues Legacies and Black Feminism by Angela Davis; Blues Empress in Black Chattanooga: Bessie Smith and the Emerging Urban South by Michelle Scott; and Jamaica Kincaid's book, Autobiography of My Mother, really informed me visually and thematically."

== Reception ==
The film received positive reviews from critics, with many critics praising the performances of Queen Latifah, Mo'Nique, and Michael K. Williams, while criticizing the use of the "Hollywood biopic" formula. Rotten Tomatoes gave it a score of 91% based on 32 reviews, with an average rating of 6.8/10. The website's critics consensus reads: "Strong performances, led by Queen Latifah, overpower a middling script in the entertaining and informative Bessie." Metacritic gave the film a score of 75 out of 100 based on 20 critic reviews.

As of 2016, Bessie remained the most watched HBO original movie of all time with 1.34 million viewers and an 18–49 demo rating of 0.4.

== Accolades ==
Year	Award	Category	Nominee(s)	Result	Ref.
2015	Critics' Choice Television Awards	Best Movie		Won	
2015	Critics' Choice Television Awards	Best Actress in a Movie or Limited Series	Queen Latifah	Nominated	
2015	Critics' Choice Television Awards	Best Supporting Actress in a Movie or Limited Series	Khandi Alexander	Nominated	
2015	Critics' Choice Television Awards	Best Supporting Actress in a Movie or Limited Series	Mo'Nique	Nominated	
2015	Online Film & Television Association Awards	Best Motion Picture		Won	
2015	Online Film & Television Association Awards	Best Actress in a Motion Picture or Miniseries	Queen Latifah	Nominated	
2015	Online Film & Television Association Awards	Best Supporting Actress in a Motion Picture or Miniseries	Khandi Alexander	Nominated	
2015	Online Film & Television Association Awards	Best Supporting Actress in a Motion Picture or Miniseries	Mo'Nique	Nominated	
2015	Online Film & Television Association Awards	Best Direction of a Motion Picture or Miniseries	Dee Rees	Nominated	
2015	Online Film & Television Association Awards	Best Writing of a Motion Picture or Miniseries	Dee Rees, Christopher Cleveland, and Bettina Gilois	Nominated	
2015	Online Film & Television Association Awards	Best Ensemble in a Motion Picture or Miniseries		Nominated	
2015	Online Film & Television Association Awards	Best Cinematography in a Non-Series		Nominated	
2015	Online Film & Television Association Awards	Best Costume Design in a Non-Series		Nominated	
2015	Online Film & Television Association Awards	Best Editing in a Non-Series		Nominated	
2015	Online Film & Television Association Awards	Best Makeup/Hairstyling in a Non-Series		Nominated	
2015	Online Film & Television Association Awards	Best Music in a Non-Series		Won	
2015	Online Film & Television Association Awards	Best New Titles Sequence		Nominated	
2015	Online Film & Television Association Awards	Best Production Design in a Non-Series		Won	
2015	Online Film & Television Association Awards	Best Sound in a Non-Series		Won	
2015	Primetime Emmy Awards	Outstanding Lead Actress in a Limited Series or a Movie	Queen Latifah	Nominated	
2015	Primetime Emmy Awards	Outstanding Supporting Actor in a Limited Series or a Movie	Michael Kenneth Williams	Nominated	
2015	Primetime Emmy Awards	Outstanding Supporting Actress in a Limited Series or a Movie	Mo'Nique	Nominated	
2015	Primetime Emmy Awards	Outstanding Directing for a Limited Series, Movie or a Dramatic Special	Dee Rees	Nominated	
2015	Primetime Emmy Awards	Outstanding Writing for a Limited Series, Movie or a Dramatic Special	Dee Rees, Christopher Cleveland, Bettina Gilois, and Horton Foote	Nominated	
2015	Primetime Creative Arts Emmy Awards	Outstanding Television Movie	Richard D. Zanuck, Lili Fini Zanuck, Queen Latifah, Shakim Compere, Shelby Stone, Randi Michel and Ron Schmidt	Won	
2015	Primetime Creative Arts Emmy Awards	Outstanding Casting for a Limited Series, Movie or a Special	Billy Hopkins and Jackie Burch	Nominated	
2015	Primetime Creative Arts Emmy Awards	Outstanding Cinematography for a Limited Series or Movie	Jeffrey Jur	Won	
2015	Primetime Creative Arts Emmy Awards	Outstanding Hairstyling for a Limited Series or a Movie	Lawrence Davis, Monty Schuth, Iasia Merriweather, and Victor Jones	Nominated	
2015	Primetime Creative Arts Emmy Awards	Outstanding Makeup for a Limited Series or a Movie (Non-Prosthetic)	Debi Young, Mi Young, Ngozi Olandu, Noel Hernandez, and Sian Richards	Nominated	
2015	Primetime Creative Arts Emmy Awards	Outstanding Music Composition for a Limited Series, Movie or Special (Original Dramatic Score)	Rachel Portman	Won	
2015	Primetime Creative Arts Emmy Awards	Outstanding Sound Mixing for a Limited Series or a Movie	James Emswiller, Robert Fernandez, Damian Volpe, Ed Cherney, and Evyen Klean	Won	
2015	Television Critics Association Awards	Outstanding Achievement in Movies, Miniseries and Specials		Nominated	
2015	Women Film Critics Circle Awards	Best Theatrically Unreleased Movie by or About Women		Won	
2016	American Cinema Editors Awards	Best Edited Miniseries or Motion Picture for Television	Brian A. Kates	Won	
2016	American Society of Cinematographers Awards	Outstanding Achievement in Cinematography in Television Movie, Miniseries or Pilot	Jeffrey Jur	Nominated	
2016	Art Directors Guild Awards	Excellence in Production Design Award – Television Movie or Mini-Series	Clark Hunter, Drew Monahan, Carrie Gale, and Traci Kirshbaum	Nominated	
2016	Black Reel Awards for Television	Outstanding Television Movie or Limited Series	Ron Schmidt	Won	
2016	Black Reel Awards for Television	Outstanding Director, TV Movie or Limited Series	Dee Rees	Won	
2016	Black Reel Awards for Television	Outstanding Actress, TV Movie or Limited Series	Queen Latifah	Won	
2016	Black Reel Awards for Television	Outstanding Supporting Actor, TV Movie or Limited Series	Charles S. Dutton	Nominated	
2016	Black Reel Awards for Television	Outstanding Supporting Actor, TV Movie or Limited Series	Michael Kenneth Williams	Nominated	
2016	Black Reel Awards for Television	Outstanding Supporting Actress, TV Movie or Limited Series	Mo'Nique	Nominated	
2016	Black Reel Awards for Television	Outstanding Writing, TV Movie/Limited Series	Christopher Cleveland, Bettina Gilois, and Dee Rees	Nominated	
2016	Directors Guild of America Awards	Outstanding Directorial Achievement in Movies for Television and Miniseries	Dee Rees	Won	
2016	Georgia Film Critics Association Awards	Oglethorpe Award for Excellence in Georgia Cinema	Dee Rees, Christopher Cleveland, and Bettina Gilois	Nominated	
2016	GLAAD Media Awards	Outstanding TV Movie or Limited Series		Won	
2016	Golden Globe Awards	Best Actress in a Miniseries or a Motion Picture Made for Television	Queen Latifah	Nominated	
2016	Golden Reel Awards	Best Sound Editing – Long Form Dialogue and ADR in Television	Damian Volpe, Tony Martinez, Brian Bowles, and Mary Ellen Porto	Won	
2016	Golden Reel Awards	Best Sound Editing - Long Form Sound Effects and Foley in Television	Damian Volpe, Kris Fenske, Bill Sweeney, Heather Gross, Dave Paterson, and Jay Peck	Nominated	
2016	Guild of Music Supervisors Awards	Best Music Supervision – Television Limited Series or Movie	Evyen Klean and Jennifer Reeve	Won	
2016	Guild of Music Supervisors Awards	Best Song/Recording Created for Television	"Long Old Road"; Written by Bessie Smith; Performed by Queen Latifah; Music Supervisors: Evyen Klean and Jennifer Reeve	Nominated	
2016	Make-Up Artists and Hair Stylists Guild Awards	Best Period and/or Character Hair Styling – Television Mini-Series or Motion Picture Made for Television	Lawrence Davis and Monty Schuth	Nominated	
2016	Make-Up Artists and Hair Stylists Guild Awards	Best Period and/or Character Makeup – Television Mini-Series or Motion Picture Made for Television	Debi Young, Sian Richards, and Mi Young	Nominated	
2016	NAACP Image Awards	Outstanding Television Movie, Mini-Series or Dramatic Special		Nominated	
2016	NAACP Image Awards	Outstanding Actor in a Television Movie, Mini-Series or Dramatic Special	Michael Kenneth Williams	Nominated	
2016	NAACP Image Awards	Outstanding Actress in a Television Movie, Mini-Series or Dramatic Special	Queen Latifah	Won	
2016	NAACP Image Awards	Outstanding Directing in a Motion Picture (Television)	Dee Rees	Won	
2016	NAACP Image Awards	Outstanding Writing in a Motion Picture (Television)	Dee Rees, Christopher Cleveland, and Bettina Gilois	Nominated	
2016	Satellite Awards	Best Motion Picture Made for Television		Nominated	
2016	Satellite Awards	Best Actress in a Miniseries or a Motion Picture Made for Television	Queen Latifah	Nominated	
2016	Satellite Awards	Best Actor in a Supporting Role in a Series, Miniseries or Motion Picture Made for Television	Michael Kenneth Williams	Nominated	
2016	Satellite Awards	Best Actress in a Supporting Role in a Series, Miniseries or Motion Picture Made for Television	Mo'Nique	Nominated	
2016	Screen Actors Guild Awards	Outstanding Performance by a Female Actor in a Television Movie or Miniseries	Queen Latifah	Won	
