= Clean Slate (1994 film) =

- Theatrical release poster
- Directed by: Mick Jackson
- Written by: Robert King
- Produced by: Lili Fini Zanuck; Richard D. Zanuck
- Starring: Dana Carvey; Valeria Golino; James Earl Jones; Kevin Pollak; Michael Murphy; Michael Gambon
- Cinematography: Andrew Dunn
- Edited by: Priscilla Nedd-Friendly
- Music by: Alan Silvestri
- Production companies: Metro-Goldwyn-Mayer; The Zanuck Company
- Distributed by: Metro-Goldwyn-Mayer
- Release date: May 6, 1994
- Running time: 107 minutes
- Country: United States
- Language: English
- Box office: $7.4 million (US)

Clean Slate is a 1994 American comedy film directed by Mick Jackson. The film stars Dana Carvey as a private investigator who is the key witness in a murder case. After suffering a head injury, however, he has developed a rare form of amnesia that causes him to forget anything that happened to him the previous day, which makes it hard for him to know whom to trust, or if he even knows them at all. Valeria Golino, James Earl Jones, Michael Murphy, Michael Gambon, and Kevin Pollak co-star. Bryan Cranston also appears.

== Plot ==
Maurice Pogue has retrograde amnesia, which prevents him from remembering anything that happened to him the day before. He realizes from a recording he made for himself the previous night – to keep himself in the know – that he is a private investigator in Los Angeles. He acquired the condition after being injured during a case. Pogue tells himself not to reveal his condition to anyone, as he is the key witness in the case against the man responsible for his amnesia. A strange woman, Sarah Novak, appears on the recording, and she informs him she has been living under the alias Beth Holly in San Francisco and has come to L.A. because she is being blackmailed. The police then visit Pogue's office and take him to his birthday party. He tells his friend Dolby that he's seen Sarah, and learns from Dolby that Sarah is dead. While at the party, Pogue also meets Anthony Doover, his doctor, who only knows of Pogue's condition.

Two henchmen take him from the party to meet Philip Cornell, the man Pogue is to testify against. Cornell offers Pogue a lot of money to deny witnessing Cornell's involvement in the crime. On re-examining his files at the office, Pogue learns that Sarah was once Cornell's lover, who decided to testify against Cornell lest he kill her because of her knowledge of his illegal activities. Sarah hired Pogue to protect her, but was killed by a car bomb, the same bomb that caused his amnesia. That night, Pogue meets Sarah at a fashion show where she is modeling. She tells him the girl that was killed in the explosion was a double, and that someone is threatening to tell Cornell she is still alive. Sarah also tells Pogue about a valuable coin Cornell stole from the L.A. County Museum, which she, in turn, stole from him. Sarah tells Pogue that she gave him the coin the morning before the explosion; Pogue cannot remember. The only clue they have about the coin's location is one word Pogue said when Sarah gave it to him: "Baby".

The following day, Pogue had forgotten everything again. Cornell shows up at his office to get Pogue's sworn statement, but Pogue, mistaking Cornell for his landlord, gives him a check for rent. Pogue tries to figure out where the coin is but finds no answers. Later, he meets with Sarah; she stays at his place, and they make love. Pogue wakes up the following day, remembering everything from the day before. He recalls hiding the coin in its collar after learning his dog is Baby. He takes Sarah to a pay phone to call the blackmailers; Pogue notices that her handwriting is not the same as on the note in which the coin was wrapped. Thus, realizing she cannot be Sarah Novak, he switches the coin without her knowledge. He then follows her and finds Doover, and she has set up the scam to get the coin. When Doover says they'll have to start again after they failed to get the coin, the woman posing as Sarah refuses to go through with it again. That night, while sitting in Pogue's car outside his office, the woman reveals to one of Pogue's recorders that she is Beth Holly, whom Doover had hired because of her resemblance to Novak. Cornell's men then kidnap Beth when they see her in the car.

On Thursday morning, Cornell, who has figured out that Pogue has the coin, abducts Pogue and takes him to his home, where he attempts to torture him to give up the coin. Pogue and Holly escape and rush to Cornell's trial. During the trial, Pogue falls back in his chair, hits his head, and suddenly regains his memory. He tells Beth that he put the coin in a parking meter, and she speeds off to get it. Pogue then gives his testimony against Cornell, which prompts Cornell to change his plea in the case. Pogue finds Beth back at his apartment, and the story ends when the two kiss and go inside.

== Cast ==
- Dana Carvey as Maurice L. Pogue
- Valeria Golino as Sarah Novak / Beth Holly
- Jayne Brook as Paula
- Olivia d'Abo as Judy
- Michael Murphy as Dr. Anthony Doover
- Michael Gambon as Philip Cornell
- Kevin Pollak as Donald Rosenheim
- James Earl Jones as John Dolby
- Angela Paton as Shirley Pogue
- Michael Monks as Lieutenant Willis
- Vyto Ruginis as Hendrix
- Gailard Sartain as Judge Block
- Christopher Meloni as Bodyguard #2
- Bryan Cranston as Club Official
- Phil Leeds as Landford

== Release ==
Clean Slate debuted in 1,457 theatres across the United States on May 6, 1994. The film grossed $3,136,130 during its opening weekend, ranking number four at the box office. In its second week, though released in 17 more theatres, it made $1,498,602, more than a 50% drop in gross income. The film eventually grossed a total $7,355,425 in the United States.

It was released on DVD in the US on October 8, 2002 and Blu-ray on March 22, 2016.

== Soundtrack ==
The CD soundtrack composed by Alan Silvestri was released by Music Box Records.

== Reception ==
On Rotten Tomatoes it has an approval rating of 19% based on 16 reviews, with an average rating of 4.1/10. At Allmovie, the film received a 1.5 out of 5-star rating. Audiences surveyed by CinemaScore gave the film a grade B+ on scale of A to F.

David Nusair of Apollo Guide stated, "You're virtually guaranteed to have forgotten it by the following morning." Brian Lowry of Variety wrote that although the film has "a few inspired comic moments", it is a rehash of Groundhog Day. Caryn James of The New York Times wrote that it is "perfectly pleasant to sit through, but always feels as if it's about to become funnier than it is". Peter Rainer of the Los Angeles Times wrote that it does not live up to its good premise.

== See also ==
- List of American films of 1994
- Memento
