= Kim Wozencraft =

American author (born 1954)

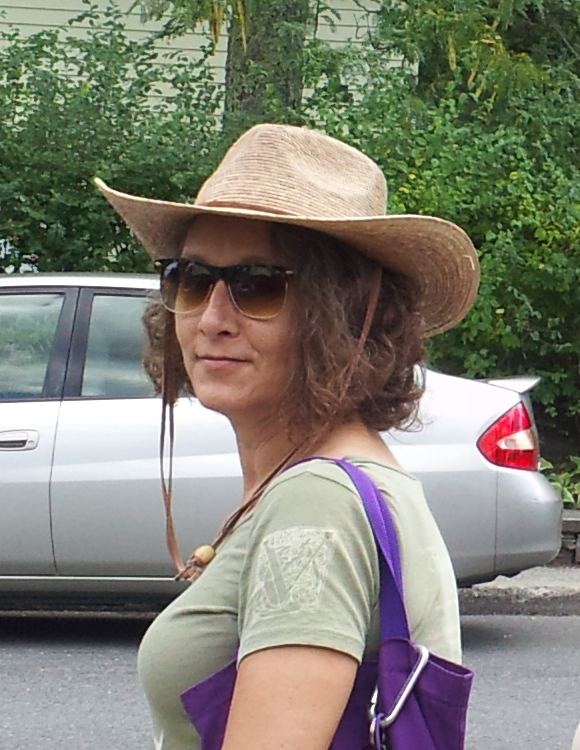
- Kim Wozencraft in Woodstock, New York (August 18, 2012)
- Born: December 4, 1954 (age 71); Dallas, Texas, U.S.
- Citizenship: American
- Education: Columbia University (MFA)
- Occupation: Writer
- Writing career
- Language: English
- Genres: Psychological thriller, Action, Crime
- Notable works: Rush, Notes from the Country Club
- Notable awards: Best American Essays 1988
- Website: www.kimwozencraft.com

Kim Wozencraft (born December 4, 1954) is an American author. She is best known as the author of the novel Rush, which was subsequently adapted into a 1991 feature film directed by Lili Fini Zanuck and starring Jennifer Jason Leigh, Jason Patric, Gregg Allman and Sam Elliott.

== Early life ==
Wozencraft was born in Dallas, Texas and attended Lake Highlands High School.

== Career ==
Her first novel, Rush, is based on her experiences working as an undercover narcotics agent in Texas soon after President Richard Nixon declared a "war on drugs". Her novel Notes From the Country Club grew out of time served in federal prison. Wozencraft co-edited the book Slam, a companion edition to the award-winning 1998 film. She was executive editor at Prison Life magazine, has written for HBO Films, and her work has appeared in The Best American Essays, Texas Monthly, New York Newsday, the Los Angeles Times, and various literary magazines and anthologies.

== Education ==
Wozencraft has a Master of Fine Arts degree from Columbia University.

== Selected works ==
- Rush (1990)
- Notes from the Country Club (1993)
- The Catch (1998)
- Slam (1998)
- Wanted (2004)
- The Devil's Backbone (2006)
- Neglect (2021)
