= Mulholland Falls =

1996 film by Lee Tamahori

- Theatrical release poster
- Directed by: Lee Tamahori
- Screenplay by: Pete Dexter
- Story by: Pete Dexter; Floyd Mutrux
- Produced by: Lili Fini Zanuck; Richard D. Zanuck
- Starring: Nick Nolte; Melanie Griffith; Chazz Palminteri; Michael Madsen; Chris Penn; Treat Williams; Jennifer Connelly; Andrew McCarthy; John Malkovich
- Cinematography: Haskell Wexler
- Edited by: Sally Menke
- Music by: Dave Grusin
- Production companies: Metro-Goldwyn-Mayer Pictures; PolyGram Filmed Entertainment; Largo Entertainment; The Zanuck Company
- Distributed by: MGM/UA Distribution Co. (United States and Canada); Largo Entertainment (International)
- Release date: April 26, 1996 (United States)
- Running time: 107 minutes
- Country: United States
- Language: English
- Budget: $40 million
- Box office: $11.5 million

Mulholland Falls is a 1996 American neo-noir crime thriller film directed by Lee Tamahori, written by Pete Dexter, and starring an ensemble cast featuring Nick Nolte, Jennifer Connelly, Chazz Palminteri, Michael Madsen, Chris Penn, Melanie Griffith, Andrew McCarthy, Treat Williams, and John Malkovich.

Nolte plays the head of an elite group of four Los Angeles Police Department detectives (based on the real life LAPD Gangster Squad) who are known for stopping at nothing, including outright murder, to maintain control of their jurisdiction, with the tacit approval of the police chief (Bruce Dern).

Mulholland Falls was released by MGM/UA Distribution Co. on April 26, 1996 in the United States, with Largo Entertainment releasing in other territories. The film received mixed to negative reviews from critics and was a box office bomb, grossing $11.5 million against a $40 million budget.

== Plot ==
In the early 1950s, a four-man squad of LAPD detectives, frustrated with the rules and weaknesses of the legal system stopping them from more aggressively battling crime, toss Jack Flynn, a powerful gangster from Chicago, off a cliff on Mulholland Drive, nicknamed "Mulholland Falls" for all the criminals they have thrown to their deaths.

The squad leader, Lieutenant Maxwell Hoover, and his partners Ellery Coolidge, Eddie Hall, and Arthur Relyea are brought in to investigate the suspicious death of a young woman whose body was found at a construction site. An examination reveals that every bone in her body is broken and the coroner comments that she looks as though she "jumped off a cliff" even though there are no cliffs nearby. The woman turns out to be someone Hoover knew very well: a prostitute named Allison Pond. The detectives receive a film of Allison having sex in her apartment, taken by a camera hidden behind a two-way mirror. Allison's friend, Jimmy Fields, admits that he made numerous such films, including one with Hoover in it. Fields is subsequently murdered while being guarded by Hall and Relyea.

Radioactive glass is found in Allison's foot, which leads the detectives to the Nevada Test Site, where they are quickly caught by base security. Their superior, Col. Fitzgerald, threatens to have the squad arrested and prosecuted for trespassing on a secret government facility, but the team is able to escape their predicament when the man in the film is identified as the civilian commander of the base, retired Gen. Thomas Timms. Timms, the head of the Atomic Energy Commission, confirms that he slept with Pond, but has an alibi for the day of her death. An FBI agent visits the LAPD and personally asks the chief to stop the investigation; when his request is denied, Hoover's house is ransacked by federal agents with a search warrant, who fail to recover the film. Hoover brutally assaults the FBI agent, after which another film is delivered to his wife Kate, showing her husband and Allison having sex in her apartment.

The blackmailer turns out to be Fitzgerald, who demands the film of Timms with Allison be brought to him. Hoover realizes that Fields' film footage of Allison also includes images of "atomic soldiers", American servicemen who were unwillingly used by Fitzgerald as guinea pigs for A-bomb tests before being transferred to a secure military hospital ward on his orders; the colonel intends to let them die so he can avoid being held accountable. Hoover and Coolidge fly to the base, and secretly deliver the film to Timms, who is terminally ill with cancer himself, so he can expose Fitzgerald's wrongdoing.

For their return trip to Los Angeles, Hoover and Coolidge board a C-47 cargo plane, where they are joined by Fitzgerald and his aide, the Captain. During the flight, Hoover deduces how Pond was murdered and tells Coolidge that Fitzgerald is going to kill them the same way - by throwing them out of the plane in mid-flight. In a vicious struggle, the detectives fight for their lives. Coolidge charges the Captain as gunshots go off. The detectives are finally able to throw the Captain and Fitzgerald out of the plane, both falling to their deaths. The pilot is also accidentally shot, but manages a crash landing before he dies. Coolidge celebrates the landing until realizing that he, too, has been shot, and dies at the scene.

Hoover cannot reconcile with his wife at Coolidge's funeral because she feels betrayed and heartbroken, and afterwards, she leaves him for good. With the news that his unit has been disbanded in order to protect the LAPD's image, Hoover is left with nothing.

== Cast ==
- Nick Nolte as Lieutenant Max Hoover
- Melanie Griffith as Katherine Hoover
- Chazz Palminteri as Detective Elleroy Coolidge
- Michael Madsen as Detective Eddie Hall
- Chris Penn as Detective Arthur Relyea
- Treat Williams as Colonel Nathan Fitzgerald
- Jennifer Connelly as Allison Pond
- Daniel Baldwin as FBI Special Agent Jeffrey McCafferty
- Andrew McCarthy as Jimmy Fields
- John Malkovich as General Thomas Timms
- Kyle Chandler as Captain
- Bruce Dern as Chief William H. Parker (uncredited)
- William Petersen as Jack Flynn (uncredited)
- Louise Fletcher as Esther (uncredited)
- Ed Lauter as Earl
- Titus Welliver as Kenny Kamins, Mobster
- Rob Lowe as Hoodlum (uncredited)

== Production ==
Principal photography took place in Los Angeles, Malibu and Desert Hot Springs in California as well as Wendover, Utah.

== Reception ==
=== Box office ===
Mulholland Falls opened in wide release in the United States on April 26, 1996. The box office receipts were poor, earning $4,306,221 (1,625 screens) and the total receipts for the run were $11,504,190. In its widest release, the film was featured in 1,625 theaters. The film was in circulation seven weeks (45 days).

=== Critical response ===
Review aggregator Rotten Tomatoes reported that 31% of critics gave Mulholland Falls a positive review, based on 32 reviews, with an average rating of 5.14/10. The website's critics consensus reads: "Mulholland Falls' vacant characterizations and thin story undercuts its impressive cast and potent style, making for an empty exercise in noir posturing." Audiences polled by CinemaScore gave the film an average grade of "C+" on an A+ to F scale.

Chicago Sun-Times film critic Roger Ebert, a fan of noir, liked Mulholland Falls, writing: 'This is the kind of movie where every note is put in lovingly. It's a 1950s crime movie, but with a modern, ironic edge: The cops are just a shade over the top, just slightly in on the joke. They smoke all through the movie, but there's one scene where they're disturbed and thoughtful, and they all light up and smoke furiously, the smoke lit by the cinematographer to look like great billowing clouds, and you smile, because you know the scene is really about itself.'

Kenneth Turan, film critic for the Los Angeles Times, wrote that Mulholland Falls 'goes about its business without a trace of finesse', but he approved of the direction and the acting, especially the 'haunting presence' of Jennifer Connelly, writing, "Mulholland Falls combines a vivid sense of place with a visceral directorial style that fuses controlled fury onto everything it touches."

In The New York Times, Janet Maslin lauded Mulholland Falls, writing wrote: 'Mr. Tamahori, who gives Mulholland Falls a smashing, insidious L.A.-noir style meant to recall Chinatown, along with a high-testosterone swagger that is distinctively his own. This director's first Hollywood film has such punch, in fact, that it takes a while to realize how slight and sometimes noxious its concerns really are. But Mulholland Falls is so well cast and relentlessly stylish (thanks to some fine technical talent assembled here) that its sheer energy prevails over its shaky plot. After all, when a filmmaker can show Ms. Griffith contentedly reading A Farewell to Arms, there's not much he won't do. So this film has all the Chinatown staples—dangerous sex, corrupt power and a vast environment-damaging conspiracy—along with mushroom clouds, porn movies, a crash-landing airplane and many quick bursts of one-on-one violence.'

However, many reviewers echoed critic Peter Stack. Writing for the San Francisco Chronicle, he noted: "Mulholland Falls falls flat a lot. The best of the old noir detective dramas had lively pacing and crisp tough-guy dialogue. This movie seems at times like an exercise in slow motion and in dull, cumbersome writing (the script is by novelist and former newspaper columnist Pete Dexter, who wrote the screenplay for Rush)."

=== Accolades ===
- 17th Golden Raspberry Awards: Worst Supporting Actress - Melanie Griffith; 1996.

== Home media ==
On August 27, 1996, Mulholland Falls was released on VHS by MGM/UA Home Video, followed by a laserdisc release on May 27, 1997. In addition, it was re-released on DVD on November 2, 2004.

== Soundtrack ==
The original score for the film was written and recorded by Dave Grusin. An original motion picture soundtrack CD was released on May 21, 1996 on the Edel America label. The CD contained 13 tracks including the old ballad, "Harbor Lights", written by Jimmy Kennedy and Hugh Williams, and sung by crooner Aaron Neville, who also performed the song in the film. There were five Top 10 recordings of the song in 1950.
