= List of presidents of ABC Entertainment =

The following is a list of presidents of the entertainment division for the American Broadcasting Company (ABC). Prior to the mid-1970s, the role was essentially filled under the title Vice President of Programs.

Name	Years	Notes
James T. Aubrey	March 1957 – April 28, 1958	As vice president in charge of programs (a title he gained before March 1957), he brought to the air what he recalled as "wild, sexy, lively stuff, things that had never been done before," shows such as Maverick, a western with James Garner, and 77 Sunset Strip, a detective show with Efrem Zimbalist Jr. (However, by the time Strip went on the air in October 1958, Aubrey had already left the network.) Oulahan and Lambert said Aubrey scheduled "one lucrative show after another ... and for the first time the third network became a serious challenge to NBC and CBS." Among the successes he scheduled were The Donna Reed Show, a domestic comedy; The Rifleman, a western with Chuck Connors; and The Real McCoys, a rural comedy with Walter Brennan and Richard Crenna.
Thomas W. Moore	1958–1963	Among the shows aired during this time were The Real McCoys, 77 Sunset Strip, My Three Sons, The Flintstones, Ben Casey, and The Untouchables. While he was network president, the network added, among other shows, McHale's Navy, Peyton Place, The Addams Family and Batman.
Edgar Scherick	June 1963 – 1966	In June 1963, Scherick became Vice President of Programming for the ABC Television Network, where he created many popular shows including Bewitched, Batman, That Girl, The Hollywood Palace, and Peyton Place.
Leonard Goldberg	1966–1969	
Martin Starger	1969–1972; 1972–1975	He led ABC during its boom period in the 1970s, pioneering the creation of television shows such as ABC Movie of the Week, Marcus Welby, M.D. and Happy Days. He also pushed the limits of television broadcast presiding over pioneering miniseries and specials such as Roots and Rich Man, Poor Man.
Barry Diller	1973–1974	He was hired as an assistant by Leonard Goldberg, then west coast head of ABC, who was promoted to network President at the same time Diller went to work for him in 1964, taking him on to New York City. Diller was soon placed in charge of negotiating broadcast rights to feature films. He was promoted to Vice President of Development in 1965. In this position, Diller created the ABC Movie of the Week, pioneering the concept of the made-for-television movie through a regular series of 90-minute films produced exclusively for television.
Fred Silverman	1975–1978	Silverman was named president of ABC Entertainment in 1975, putting him in the awkward position of saving Happy Days, the very show that Good Times had brought to the brink of cancellation. Silverman succeeded in bringing Happy Days to the top of the ratings and generating a hit spin-off from that show, Laverne & Shirley. At ABC, Silverman also greenlit other popular series such as The Bionic Woman (a Six Million Dollar Man spin-off), Family, Charlie's Angels, Donny & Marie, Three's Company, Eight Is Enough, The Love Boat, Soap, Fantasy Island, Good Morning America, long form pioneer Rich Man, Poor Man and the award-winning miniseries, Roots. These moves brought ABC's long-dormant ratings from third place to first place. However, Silverman was criticized during this period for relying heavily on escapist fare (it was Silverman who conceived the infamous The Brady Bunch Hour with Sid and Marty Krofft in late 1976) and for bringing T&A or "jiggle TV" to the small screen with numerous ABC shows featuring buxom, attractive, and often scantily-clad young women (such as the popular Battle of the Network Stars). ABC Daytime had mediocre ratings, so in order to increase them, Silverman hired Gloria Monty to produce the ailing General Hospital. He gave Monty thirteen weeks to increase the serial's ratings or it would be cancelled. He later expanded General Hospital and One Life to Live to a full hour, and created a 3 1/2 hour afternoon serial block. Among game shows, Silverman introduced Goodson-Todman's Family Feud to the network. During Silverman's time at ABC, he overhauled the network's Saturday-morning cartoon output, dumping Filmation (which had produced the failed Uncle Croc's Block) and replacing it with content from Hanna-Barbera, including a continuation of Scooby-Doo. ABC abandoned the wiping of video-taped programs under Silverman's watch in 1978, as CBS had done while he was at that network.
Anthony Thomopoulos	1978–1983	His big break came in 1973, when Barry Diller hired him on at ABC to oversee prime-time programming. He was noted, among other things, for the tough position he took in dealing with the contract holdout of Suzanne Somers on the hit ABC show Three's Company, and for his quick cancellation of the 1982 cult favorite Police Squad!, explaining that the show had been cancelled because, among other reasons, "it required constant attention".
Lewis Erlicht	1983 – November 1985	After seeing Emmanuel Lewis in a Burger King commercial, ABC's programming chief, Lew Erlicht, wanted to give the actor his own series. At this time, Another Ballgame creator Stu Silver desired to develop an original show based on the lead characters portrayed by Katharine Hepburn and Spencer Tracy in the film Woman of the Year and saw Alex Karras and Susan Clark's on-screen chemistry as being strikingly reminiscent of this. The network felt the need to cast Lewis in a project quickly, before he grew another inch (like child actor Gary Coleman, who was also small for his age, Lewis would end up at 4'3".) With the number of comedy pilots ABC had greenlit for that fall's schedule, it was likely that Lewis would not be able to get his own series and timeslot unless he was worked into already-existing comedy projects. So, among others shows, co-producers on Another Ballgame were approached about working Lewis into the show. Stars Karras and Clark liked the idea of the sudden marriage and instant adoption of a young black boy, and the Webster character was thus created. Moonlighting was created by Glenn Gordon Caron, one of the producers of the similar Remington Steele, when he was approached by Erlicht. Erlicht liked the work Caron had done on Taxi and Remington Steele and wanted a detective show featuring a major star in a leading role who would appeal to an upscale audience. Caron wanted to do a romance, to which Erlicht replied "I don't care what it is, as long as it's a detective show.”
Brandon Stoddard	1985–1989	During his tenure as the head of ABC entertainment shows such as Roseanne, The Wonder Years and Thirtysomething were created.
Bob Iger	1989–1992	
Ted Harbert	1992–1996	At ABC, Harbert was closely associated with groundbreaking programs such as The Wonder Years, NYPD Blue, The Practice, and My So Called Life, among many others, and, during his tenure, ABC moved to the top in primetime programs in 1995 for the first time in 17 years, and led all the networks in profits for several years.
Jamie Tarses	1996–1999	Tarses was the first woman and one of the youngest people to hold such a post in an American broadcast network. Tarses was the subject of a noteworthy "unflattering profile" written by Lynn Hirschberg in the New York Times Magazine in July 1997.
Stuart Bloomberg	1999 – January 2002	
Susan M. Lyne	January 2002 – May 2004	
Lloyd Braun	2002 – November 2004	Braun was forced out of his position at ABC shortly after greenlighting the $13 million pilot to the television show Lost, one of the most expensive in modern broadcasting. His decision was vindicated, however, when the show went on to become a huge success. Braun and his partner, Susan Lyne, also greenlit other ABC shows that went on to great success in the years following his dismissal, including Desperate Housewives, Extreme Makeover Home Edition, Boston Legal and Grey's Anatomy. These shows began an unprecedented turnaround for ABC.
Stephen McPherson	2004 – July 2010	With relatively little buzz surrounding its 2010–11 pilots, compounded by a sexual harassment lawsuit against him, Stephen McPherson resigned as ABC Entertainment Group president on July 27, 2010. Paul Lee (who previously served as the president of sister cable channel ABC Family) was announced as his replacement that same day.
Paul Lee	2010 – February 2016	
Channing Dungey	2016–2018	Dungey was hired as president on February 17, 2016, replacing Paul Lee. Dungey oversaw the development of ABC Studio shows such as Scandal, Criminal Minds, How to Get Away with Murder, Nashville, Quantico, Army Wives and Once Upon A Time, as well as the second cancellation of Roseanne on May 29, 2018.
Karey Burke	2018–2020	
Craig Erwich	2020–present	Also serves as President of Hulu Originals.

== See also ==
- List of programs broadcast by American Broadcasting Company
