= The Girl from Petrovka =

1974 film by Robert Ellis Miller

- 1974 movie poster
- Directed by: Robert Ellis Miller
- Written by: Chris Bryant; Allan Scott based on the novel by George Feifer
- Produced by: David Brown; Richard D. Zanuck
- Starring: Goldie Hawn; Hal Holbrook; Anthony Hopkins; Grégoire Aslan
- Cinematography: Vilmos Zsigmond
- Edited by: John F. Burnett
- Music by: Henry Mancini
- Production companies: KMA; Universal Pictures
- Distributed by: Universal Pictures
- Release date: August 16, 1974 (Los Angeles)
- Running time: 103 minutes
- Country: United States
- Language: English

The Girl from Petrovka is a 1974 American comedy-drama film starring Goldie Hawn and Hal Holbrook, based on the novel by George Feifer. It is about an American journalist, Joe (Holbrook) who goes to the Soviet Union and meets Oktyabrina (Hawn), an undocumented ballet dancer, which attracts the attention of the authorities.

== Plot ==
Joe (Hal Holbrook) is a cynical American journalist assigned to work in the Soviet Union, where he meets Oktyabrina (Goldie Hawn), a spirited and erratic Russian ballet dancer who lives illegally without proper documents. Their ensuing romance opens new possibilities for both; but also draws the attention of the Soviet authorities.

== Cast ==
- Goldie Hawn as Oktyabrina Matveyeva
- Hal Holbrook as Joe
- Anthony Hopkins as Kostya
- Grégoire Aslan as Minister
- Anton Dolin as Ignatievitch
- Bruno Wintzell as Alexander
- Zoran Andric as Leonid
- Hanna Hertelendy as Judge
- Maria Sukolov as Old Crone
- Zitto Kazann as Passport Black Marketeer
- Inger Jensen as Helga Van Dam
- Raymond O'Keefe as Minister's Driver
- Richard Marner as Kremlin Press Official
- Michael Janisch as Police Chief Valinikov
- Harry Towb as American Reporter

== Production ==
Some filming was planned to take place in Belgrade, Yugoslavia, but Yugoslavia's Inex Films canceled its contract with Universal Pictures for undisclosed reasons just two weeks before shooting was set to begin, and production had to be moved to Vienna. Director Robert Ellis Miller suspected that Inex's decision was made under pressure from Moscow. A Yugoslavian official denied this, but did reveal that Inex was fearful of offending Russia with the film.

== Reception ==
Nora Sayre of The New York Times wrote that "Goldie Hawn can't play a Russian" and Hal Holbrook "has little to do beyond shaking his head when he thinks of her smiling indulgently when he looks at her ... Certainly, neither performer has been aided by the script." Arthur D. Murphy of Variety wrote, "What 25 years of Cold War 'comedy' cliche and the latterday Nixon detente haven't done to make irrelevant 'The Girl From Petrovoka,' artless writing and direction have. This sixth Richard D. Zanuck-David Brown production for Universal stars Goldie Hawn, ineffective as a ponderous Russian version of a free spirit, and Hal Holbrook, who cannot alone make work such sterile and cornball comedy dramaturgy." Gene Siskel of the Chicago Tribune gave the film 1.5 stars out of 4. He called the story "insipid" and wrote of Goldie Hawn that "there is no way she can handle a Russian accent. Her dialect floats from the Volga to the Mississippi during a single sentence."

== See also ==
- List of American films of 1974
