= David Brown (producer) =

American film and theatre producer (1916–2010)

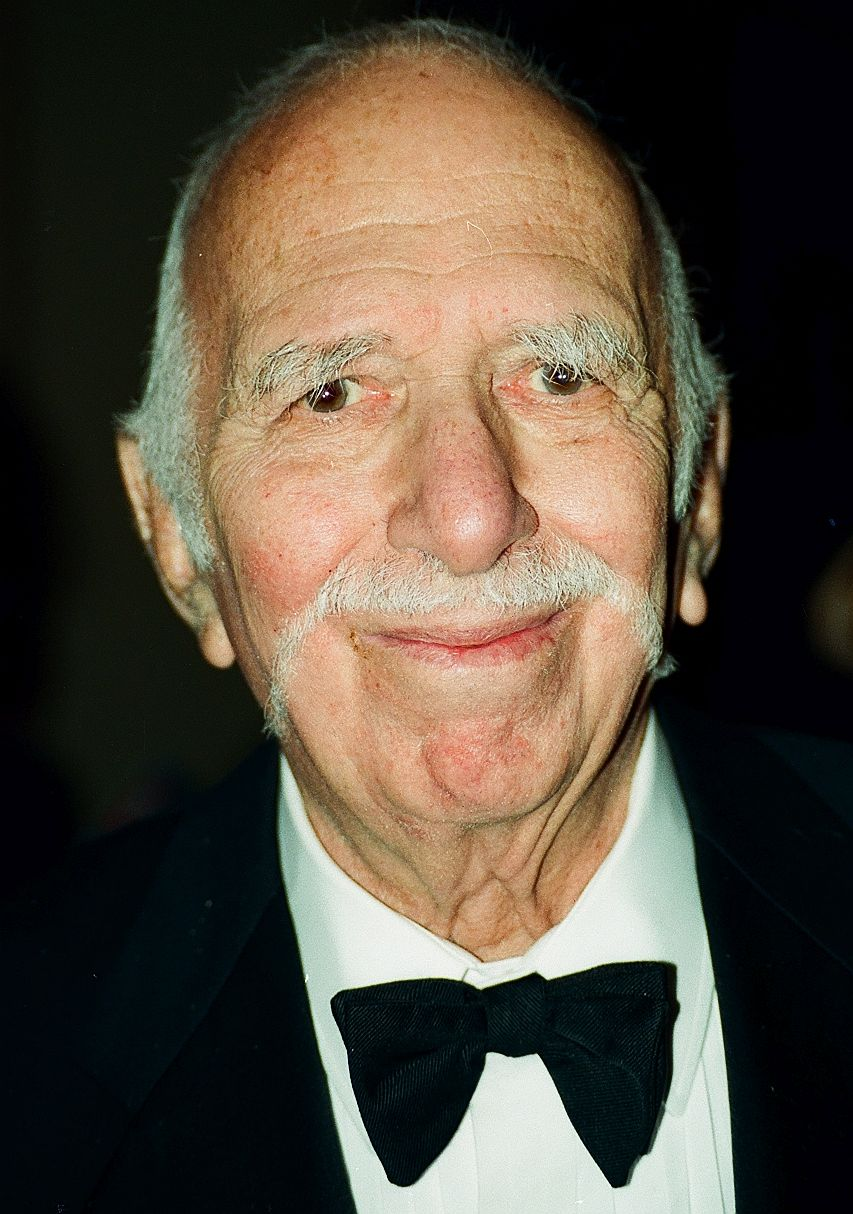
- Brown in 2000
- Born: July 28, 1916; New York City, U.S.
- Died: February 1, 2010 (aged 93); New York City, U.S.
- Education: Stanford University; Columbia University Graduate School of Journalism
- Occupations: Film producer; author; journalist
- Years active: 1973–2002
- Spouse: Helen Gurley Brown (m. 1959)
- Children: Bruce Brown
- Awards: Irving G. Thalberg Memorial Award (1991)

David Brown (July 28, 1916 – February 1, 2010) was an American film and theatre producer and writer who was best known for producing the 1975 film Jaws based on the best-selling novel by Peter Benchley.

== Early life ==
He was born in New York City, the son of Lillian (née Baren) and Col. Edward Fisher Brown, and was the elder brother of Carolyn Brown, who married French aristocrat Emmanuel de Crussol d'Uzès, Duke of Uzès, then who remarried to Geoffrey Carpenter Doyle, a grandson of New York City architect James Edwin Ruthven Carpenter Jr.

Brown was a graduate of Stanford University and the Columbia University Graduate School of Journalism.

== Early career ==
He began his professional career as a journalist, contributing to magazines including The Saturday Evening Post, Harper's and Collier's, before becoming an editor himself. He was a managing editor of Cosmopolitan before his wife, Helen Gurley Brown, joined the magazine.

== Production career ==
=== Film ===
In 1951, the producer Darryl F. Zanuck hired Brown to head the story department at Zanuck's studio, 20th Century-Fox. Brown eventually rose to become executive vice president of creative operations. He and Richard D. Zanuck, Darryl's son, left Fox in 1971 for Warner Bros., but the following year they set out to form their own production company.

The caper film The Sting (1973) starring Paul Newman and Robert Redford was a Zanuck/Brown "presentation". In 1974, the company produced, along with Universal Pictures, The Sugarland Express, Steven Spielberg's directorial debut, for a motion picture. Thereafter, the pair were credited as producers or executive producers of more than a dozen films, including the courtroom drama The Verdict (1982), directed by Sidney Lumet and starring Paul Newman; the science-fiction Cocoon (1985), directed by Ron Howard; and the comedy drama Driving Miss Daisy (1989), directed by Bruce Beresford and starring Jessica Tandy and Morgan Freeman. Driving Miss Daisy won four Academy Awards, including the Best Picture award.

In 1988, he broke off from longtime partner Richard D. Zanuck and launched its own production company, The Manhattan Project. Without Zanuck, Brown went on to produce films including the drama Angela's Ashes (1999) and the romance Chocolat (2000).

He and partner Zanuck were jointly awarded the Irving G. Thalberg Memorial Award by the Academy of Motion Picture Arts and Sciences in 1990 for their achievements in producing films including the horror thriller Jaws (1975), directed by Steven Spielberg.

=== Theater ===
Brown produced various Broadway musicals, including Sweet Smell of Success: The Musical (2002), Dirty Rotten Scoundrels (2005), and the off-Broadway Jerry Herman musical revue Showtune (2003).

He bought the film and stage rights to the drama play A Few Good Men, written by playwright Aaron Sorkin. The play opened November 1989 and ran for 500 performances. The film of the same name (1992) stars Tom Cruise and Jack Nicholson.

== Personal life ==
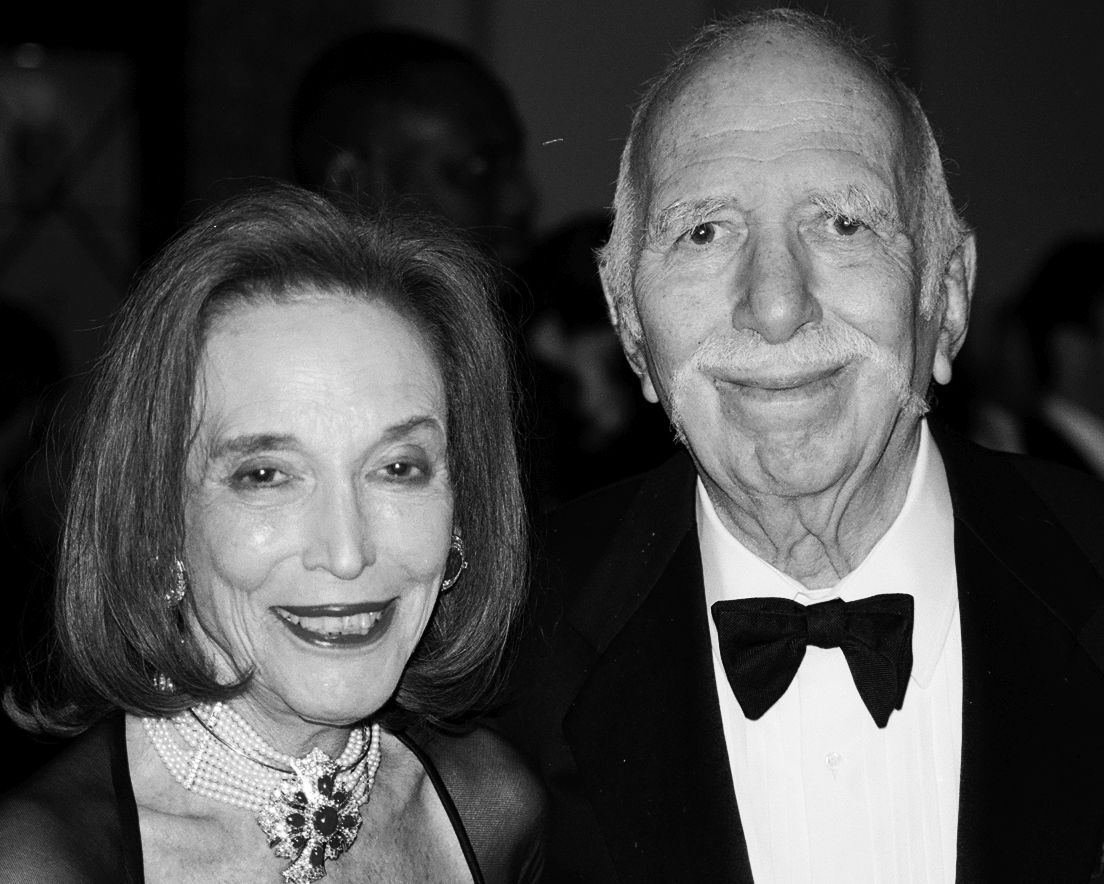
Helen Gurley and David Brown

David Brown was married and divorced twice. Helen Gurley Brown would be his third wife. From 1959, for fifty-one years, until his death, Brown was the husband of Helen Gurley Brown, editor of Cosmopolitan magazine for 32 years, and author of Sex and the Single Girl.

Brown had one son, Bruce, from a prior marriage, who predeceased him, and a half brother, Edward Fisher Brown Jr.

He was known equally for his mannerliness, fine wardrobe, distinctive mustache and for championing writers. He had strong connections with publishers and agents.

Brown wrote Brown's Guide to the Good Life: Tears, Fears and Boredom (2005), which gives advice on life. He also wrote Let Me Entertain You (1990), an anecdotal autobiography.

=== Death ===
He died, age 93, at his home in Manhattan from kidney failure on February 1, 2010. His widow, Helen, died on August 13, 2012, age 90. Mr. and Mrs. Brown were laid to rest in late November 2012 in adjacent graves at Sisco Cemetery in Arkansas. Helen's maternal family cemetery is located just south of the village of Osage in Carroll County, Arkansas.

== Filmography ==
He was a producer in all films unless otherwise noted.

=== Film ===
| Year | Film | Credit | Notes |
|---|---|---|---|
| 1973 | Sssssss | Executive producer | |
| 1973 | The Sting | Executive producer | Uncredited |
| 1974 | Willie Dynamite | | |
| 1974 | The Sugarland Express | | |
| 1974 | The Black Windmill | Executive producer | |
| 1974 | The Girl from Petrovka | | |
| 1975 | The Eiger Sanction | Executive producer | |
| 1975 | Jaws | | |
| 1977 | MacArthur | Executive producer | |
| 1978 | Jaws 2 | | |
| 1980 | The Island | | |
| 1981 | Neighbors | | |
| 1982 | The Verdict | | |
| 1985 | Cocoon | | |
| 1985 | Target | | |
| 1988 | Cocoon: The Return | | |
| 1989 | Driving Miss Daisy | Executive producer | |
| 1992 | The Player | | |
| 1992 | Rich in Love | Co-producer | |
| 1992 | A Few Good Men | | |
| 1993 | The Cemetery Club | | |
| 1993 | Watch It | Executive producer | |
| 1995 | Canadian Bacon | | |
| 1997 | The Saint | | |
| 1997 | Kiss the Girls | | |
| 1998 | Deep Impact | | |
| 1999 | Angela's Ashes | | |
| 2000 | Chocolat | | |
| 2001 | Along Came a Spider | | |

=== Television ===
| Year | Title | Credit | Notes |
|---|---|---|---|
| 1987 | CBS Summer Playhouse | Executive producer | |
| 1990 | Women & Men: Stories of Seduction | | Television film |
| 1991 | Women & Men 2 | | Television film |
| 1996 | A Season in Purgatory | Executive producer | |
| 2002 | Framed | Executive producer | Television film |

Thanks

| Year | Title | Notes |
|---|---|---|
| 2014 | Of Dark & Disturbing Things | In memory of |
