= Wild Bill (1995 film) =

1995 Western film by Walter Hill

- Theatrical release poster
- Directed by: Walter Hill
- Written by: Walter Hill
- Based on: Fathers and Sons by Thomas Babe; Deadwood by Pete Dexter
- Produced by: Richard D. Zanuck; Lili Fini Zanuck
- Starring: Jeff Bridges; Ellen Barkin; John Hurt; Diane Lane; Keith Carradine; Christina Applegate; Bruce Dern; James Gammon; David Arquette; Marjoe Gortner
- Cinematography: Lloyd Ahern II
- Edited by: Freeman A. Davies
- Music by: Van Dyke Parks
- Production companies: The Zanuck Company; United Artists
- Distributed by: MGM/UA Distribution Co. (United States); United International Pictures (International)
- Release date: December 1, 1995
- Running time: 98 minutes
- Country: United States
- Language: English
- Budget: $30 million
- Box office: $2,193,982

Wild Bill is a 1995 American biographical Western film about the last days of legendary lawman Wild Bill Hickok. The film was written and directed by Walter Hill, and based on the 1978 stage play Fathers and Sons by Thomas Babe and the 1986 novel Deadwood by Pete Dexter. It stars Jeff Bridges, Ellen Barkin, John Hurt, and Diane Lane, and was released by United Artists on December 1, 1995. It was a box-office bomb, grossing $2.1 million on a budget of $30 million, and received mixed reviews from critics.

== Plot ==
At Wild Bill Hickok's funeral, his friend Charley Prince recalls Hickok's final days in Deadwood. Calamity Jane mourns him especially. In a flashback, Bill and his friend California Joe come upon an Indian burial structure with a lone warrior sitting atop it. Joe, who speaks the warrior's language, says that the warrior wishes to kill Bill in order to correct his streak of misfortunes. Despite Joe's warning that killing Indians "in a religious frame of mind" is bad luck, Bill shoots the man dead.

Flashbacks show Bill, then a deputy U.S. marshal, killing several men in a saloon fight for knocking his hat off, before gunning down a group of soldiers after one purposely crushes his hat. While breaking up a riot, Bill gets too worked up and accidentally shoots a fellow lawman. He then retires from the law and works as an actor and trick shooter in Buffalo Bill's Wild West show. He eventually leaves the show after a medical examination uncovers symptoms of glaucoma, which will eventually leave him blind and unable to shoot properly.

Eventually winding up in Cheyenne, a man named Will Plummer, whom Bill crippled two years earlier after killing his brother, calls him out. To "even the odds," Bill has some men tie him to a chair and carry him into the street. After Plummer refuses to back down, Bill outdraws and kills him. Bill and Charley travel to Deadwood, where he is greeted with fanfare. He reunites with Jane, and they go into a saloon. There, a young drifter named Jack McCall declares that he will be the man to kill Hickok. Jane and Bill's friends berate him and throw him into the street. Joe then begins telling an exaggerated tale of Bill's past exploits; Bill grows upset, leaves the saloon and goes to an opium den.

After smoking, Bill has a disturbing dream about a time he and Joe were threatened by Indians after being caught shooting the tribe's buffalo. A woman who works at the den tells a local prostitute, Lurline, about how often Bill visits to use the opium, and she shares this information with Jack. Meanwhile, Bill and Jane share a bath, and argue because Bill will not explain his distant and unusual behavior.

The next day a mob brings Jack to Bill; Jack tells Bill that he aims to kill him because Bill mistreated his mother, Susannah Moore. Despite Charley trying to apologize for Bill and the mob harassing him, Jack does not relent. That night, Jack is approached by other men who want Bill dead, and he agrees to hire them. Bill goes back to the den and reminisces about the night he met Susannah. It is revealed that when he left town for six months, Susannah married another man, who robbed Bill of his most prized possession: his gold pocket watch. Bill kills the man in self-defense, but Susannah is distraught, and a young Jack witnesses the killing.

Jack sneaks into the den to ambush Bill while he's incapacitated, but the den owner attacks Jack and takes him away. Jack and his posse agree on a new plan as Bill continues to bemoan his bad luck. That night, he returns to the saloon, which is empty because a gold vein was discovered nearby, and everyone left to set up their claims. Jane walks in, and the two begin having sex. Jack and his posse enter the saloon and apprehend Jane, Bill, Joe, and Charley. Jack delays killing Bill because he isn't sure how he wants to do it.

Bill has one final remembrance of visiting Susannah in a mental hospital who, despite his apologies, refuses his help. Jack offers to let Bill kill himself with a gun loaded with one bullet, but deliberately takes the last bullet out so Bill will be humiliated when he tries to shoot him. Regardless, Jack claims he has already killed Bill "in his heart," and the posse leaves after Charley intervenes. Jane retrieves Bill's guns, and he ambushes the posse as they saddle their horses, killing everyone except Jack. He tells Jack he is sparing him out of respect for his mother. Jack asks if he can have one last drink before leaving town, and they return to the saloon.

In the bar, Joe resumes telling stories of Bill's antics. Jack pulls a hidden derringer from his sleeve, gathers his nerve, and shoots Bill in the back of the head. Back at his funeral, Charley says the whole town attended the funeral, and that he was honored to be Bill's friend.

== Cast ==
- Jeff Bridges as James Butler "Wild Bill" Hickok
- Ellen Barkin as Martha Jane "Calamity Jane" Cannary
- John Hurt as Charley Prince
- Diane Lane as Susannah Moore
- Keith Carradine as William Frederick "Buffalo Bill" Cody
- David Arquette as Jack McCall
- Christina Applegate as Lurline Newcomb
- Bruce Dern as Will Plummer
- James Gammon as Moses "California Joe" Milner
- Marjoe Gortner as Preacher
- James Remar as Donnie Lonigan
- Steve Reevis as He Who Whistles
- Pato Hoffmann as Cheyenne Leader
- Dennis Hayden as Phil Coe
- Peter Jason as Dave McCandless
- Lee de Broux as Carl Mann

== Production ==
=== Script ===
The script was based on several sources. One of them was the play Fathers and Sons which had been on Broadway in 1978, directed by Joseph Papp. It was written by Thomas Babe, and focused on Hickok's last days in Deadwood, placing the action in the saloon where he was killed. Babe says he entirely made up the nature of Jack McCall, whom he turned into Hickok's illegitimate son. Babe's play was seen in Los Angeles in 1980 by Walter Hill, who had been considering a film on Hickok. Hill optioned the play along with a screenplay about Hickok by Ned Wynn.

Meanwhile, the team of Richard and Lili Zanuck had optioned a 1986 novel about Hickok called Deadwood. They had hired the author, Pete Dexter, to write the script for the movie Rush. The Zanucks said they were interested in the project because it explored the nature of celebrity in a Western context. "Figures like Wild Bill were like rock stars," said Lili Zanuck. "They had sex appeal." Dexter wrote a script based on his novel which was sent to Barry Levinson and Sydney Pollack before going to Hill.

"He's a gutsy director," Zanuck said about Hill. "He's kind of a male-oriented director, and he has great knowledge of the West and all of the folklore and all of the heroes."

Hill wrote a script based on the play, the novel, and Ned Wynn's screenplay. Hill says he took details of the town from the novel but the relationship between McCall and Hickok was mostly from the play. Hill took material from Dexter's novel for the atmosphere of the town and relied on Babe's play heavily for the third act, the last hours of Hickok.

Hill said the script was based on "character rather than incident. Because I think it's not so much the fights, it's his personality, his sense of humor about himself. He seemed to understand his own legend. He both fueled it and was a prisoner of it, that it was his raison d'etre, and at the same time he felt himself very constrained by it."

The Zanucks and Walter Hill took the script to John Calley, president of United Artists, and the film was green-lighted at the end of January 1994. Jeff Bridges and Ellen Barkin signed to star.

Westerns revived in popularity in the early 90s with Dances with Wolves and Unforgiven. However, some other Westerns had been box office disappointments including Wyatt Earp and Hill's own Geronimo. Producer Richard Zanuck said, "If you make a good picture and have a compelling story to tell, it's going to work. I don't believe that any genre dies. It just has to be fed with good product."

=== Filming ===
Production was initially considered to use Santa Fe locations as the earlier Wyatt Earp and Tombstone had done. Instead, budget dictated a Los Angeles shoot with locations including Universal Studios and Warner Bros. Studios. The Gene Autry Melody Ranch in Santa Clarita, California was used to portray Deadwood.

Hill said that Jeff Bridges was "an actor I greatly love... a very nice man, decent, hard working, got along well, no problems" but that there "was always a kind of tension between Jeff and myself" because "Jeff does a lot of takes, I don't. My focus is very intense, but when it gets to be you just doing it again and again I lose it and I find an awful lot of performers go stale. He would always have an idea he thought he could make something better."

== Reception ==
=== Critical response ===
The film received a 46% approval rating on Rotten Tomatoes based on 28 reviews, with an average rating of 5.6/10. The website's critical consensus reads: "Crowded with talent on either side of the camera, Wild Bill shoots itself in the foot with a surprisingly muddled take on the story of the titular folk hero." Roger Ebert gave the film two stars out of four, criticizing its pacing and plot. He recognized the film's ambition, aiming for "elegy" and "poetry" in its final act, but ultimately described it as flawed, writing, "We can see where it's headed, although it doesn't get there." In a positive review, Bruce Fretts of Entertainment Weekly wrote that the movie "succeeds as a character study of a man whose idiosyncratic code of justice eventually catches up with him", and complimented Jeff Bridges' acting as vital to the film's success. Variety, while also praising Jeff Bridges' performance, took a critical stance, observing that the film "comes to a near dead-stop in the final stretch". Audiences polled by CinemaScore gave the film an average grade of "C" on an A+ to F scale.

=== Box office ===
Wild Bill bombed at the box office. Produced on a budget of $30 million, it took in just over $2 million in the United States.

Hill was unhappy with the way the film was released. "I believe in the old adage that when you see the trailer for your movie and it's very different from the movie you've actually made, then you can assume the studio wanted something else," Hill said. However, he did add that "I don't think any other company would have made this film, so I'm very indebted to them for letting me do it."
