= Lili Fini Zanuck =

American film director and producer

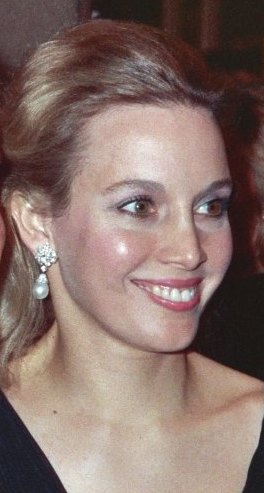
- Zanuck in 1990
- Born: Lili Fini; April 2, 1954 (age 71); Leominster, Massachusetts, U.S.
- Occupations: Film producer, director
- Spouse: Richard D. Zanuck (m. 1978; died 2012)

Lili Fini Zanuck (née Fini; born April 2, 1954) is an American film producer and director.

== Personal life ==
She was married to Richard D. Zanuck from 1978 until his death in 2012.

== Career ==
Zanuck's first film with a producing title was the 1985 critical and commercial hit Cocoon, which went on to win two Academy Awards and earned the Zanucks and David Brown the title Producer of the Year by the National Association of Theatre Owners (NATO). She also oversaw the sequel Cocoon: The Return in 1988.

In 1988, Zanuck and her husband formed The Zanuck Company. The first film they produced was Driving Miss Daisy which went on to win four Academy Awards, including Best Picture, as well as winning Best Picture – Musical or Comedy from the Hollywood Foreign Press Association and Best Film from the National Board of Review. The Zanucks were named Producer of the Year by the Producers Guild of America. Internationally, the film won two Golden Bears at the Berlin Film Festival and was nominated for Best Picture by the British Film Academy. Driving Miss Daisy was a financial success, grossing more than $100 million and ranked as one of the most profitable films in Warner Bros. history.

Zanuck directed the 1991 feature film Rush starring Jennifer Jason Leigh and Jason Patric. The film notably featured the hit song "Tears in Heaven" by Eric Clapton, who also composed the score for the picture. For television, she directed an episode of HBO's From the Earth to the Moon and three episodes of NBC's six-hour event series Revelations starring Bill Pullman.

Zanuck has also co-produced a number of films including Mulholland Falls, True Crime and Reign of Fire.

In March 2000, Zanuck co-produced the 72nd Academy Awards with her husband.

In May 2015, Zanuck executive produced and directed Bessie which premiered on HBO. She developed the project for over 22 years which was met with critical acclaim, receiving twelve 2016 Primetime Emmy Award nominations. Bessie won the 2015 Primetime Emmy Award for Outstanding Television Movie and the 2015 Critics Choice Television Award for Best Movie.

Most recently Zanuck directed the documentary Eric Clapton: Life in 12 Bars which had its world premiere at the Toronto International Film Festival in September 2017 before airing on SHOWTIME in February 2018. The film and Zanuck were Grammy nominated in the category of Best Music Film.

Zanuck has also directed television programs and music videos, including Faith Hill's "Breathe", which won the Academy of Country Music Award for Video of the Year in 1999.

== Filmography ==
=== Film ===
Director

- Rush (1991)

Producer

Year	Title	Awards
1985	Cocoon	Producer of the Year, National Association of Theatre Owners
1988	Cocoon: The Return	
1989	Driving Miss Daisy	Best Picture, Academy Awards
1989	Driving Miss Daisy	Outstanding Producer of Theatrical Motion Pictures, Producers Guild Awards
1992	Rich in Love	
1994	Clean Slate	
1995	Wild Bill	
1996	Mulholland Falls	
1999	True Crime	
2002	Reign of Fire	

=== Television ===
Director

- From the Earth to the Moon (1998)
- Revelations (2005)
- Eric Clapton: A Life in 12 Bars (2017)

Producer

Year	Title	Awards
2000	72nd Academy Awards	Emmy Award nominated, Outstanding Variety, Music or Comedy Special
2004	Dead Lawyers	
2017	Eric Clapton: A Life in 12 Bars	Grammy Award nominated, Best Music Film

Executive Producer

Year	Title	Awards
2015	Bessie	Emmy Award for Outstanding Television Movie; Critics Choice Television Award for Best Movie

=== Music video ===
Director

Year	Title	Artist	Awards
1999	"Breathe"	Faith Hill	Music Video of the Year, Academy of Country Music
1999	"Let's Make Love"	Faith Hill & Tim McGraw	
