= True Crime (1999 film) =

1999 film by Clint Eastwood

- Theatrical release poster
- Directed by: Clint Eastwood
- Screenplay by: Larry Gross; Paul Brickman; Stephen Schiff
- Based on: True Crime by Andrew Klavan
- Produced by: Clint Eastwood; Richard D. Zanuck; Lili Fini Zanuck
- Starring: Clint Eastwood; Isaiah Washington; Denis Leary; LisaGay Hamilton; James Woods
- Cinematography: Jack N. Green
- Edited by: Joel Cox
- Music by: Lennie Niehaus
- Production companies: Malpaso Productions; The Zanuck Company
- Distributed by: Warner Bros.
- Release date: March 19, 1999
- Running time: 127 minutes
- Country: United States
- Language: English
- Budget: $55 million
- Box office: $16.6 million (US)

True Crime is a 1999 American mystery thriller film directed by Clint Eastwood, based on Andrew Klavan's 1995 novel of the same name. Eastwood also stars as a journalist covering the execution of a death row inmate, only to discover that the convict may actually be innocent. The film was released by Warner Bros. on March 19, 1999, grossing $16.6 million against its $55 million production budget.

== Plot ==
Steve Everett, an Oakland journalist recovering from alcoholism, is assigned to cover the execution of convicted murderer Frank Beechum following the death of Everett's colleague, Michelle Ziegler, who had originally been assigned to the story.

Everett investigates the background to the case and comes to suspect that Beechum has been wrongly convicted of murdering Amy Wilson. He gets permission from his editor's boss to investigate, and is told that the top editor would call the Governor, and that would do the job, if Everett gets hard proof. He thus has a little over 12 hours to confirm his hunch and save Beechum.

Everett interviews a prosecution witness, Dale Porterhouse, who saw Beechum at the store with a gun. Everett questions Porterhouse's account, saying that, because of the layout of the store, he could not have seen a gun in Beechum's hand.

Everett confronts D.A. Cecelia Nussbaum, who reveals that a young man, Warren, was interviewed and claimed he had stopped at the store to buy a soda and saw nothing. Everett suspects that Warren, never called as a witness, is probably the real killer. He breaks into the deceased reporter's house, suspecting that she had been onto something and finds her file on Warren. Meanwhile, Warden Luther Plunkett also starts to have doubts about Beechum's guilt.

Everett falls out with his bosses and is fired on the spot, but he points out that his contract entitles him to adequate notice. They ask him how much notice he requires, and, looking at his watch, he says 6 hours and 7 minutes. He tracks down Angela Russel, Warren's grandmother. She tells him that her grandson could not have been the murderer, and berates him for the lack of interest from the press when Warren himself was killed in a mugging two years after Amy's murder.

The prison chaplain misrepresents an exchange with Beechum as a confession to the crime. Everett hears about this on the radio and loses heart; on top of this, his wife Barbara has found out about his affair with his editor's wife and has turned him out of the house. He is about to start drinking again when he sees a piece on TV that shows a photograph of Amy wearing a locket, a locket he realizes he has seen before, being worn by Angela Russel.

Everett drives back to Angela's house. When he tells her about the locket, she realizes the truth: her grandson was the killer. Everett now has to get Angela to the Governor's house in order to persuade him to order a stay of execution. As they approach the Governor's mansion, the first of three drugs used in the execution has already been injected into Frank's bloodstream and he has lost consciousness. The Governor calls, and the doctors try to revive him, while his wife Bonnie bangs on the window calling out for him to wake up.

Six months later, a week before Christmas, Everett is out buying a stuffed hippo for his daughter, and the store's proprietor mentions that he is famous and may even win a Pulitzer. He catches sight of Frank and his family doing their Christmas shopping. Steve and Frank acknowledge each other, but Frank's daughter shouts for him to "come on," which Frank does.

== Cast ==
- Clint Eastwood as Steve Everett
- Isaiah Washington as Frank Louis Beechum
- Denis Leary as Bob Findley
- Laila Robins as Patricia Findley
- LisaGay Hamilton as Bonnie Beechum
- James Woods as Alan Mann
- Bernard Hill as Warden Luther Plunkitt
- Diane Venora as Barbara Everett
- Francesca Eastwood as Kate Everett
- Marissa Ribisi as Amy Wilson
- Michael McKean as Reverend Shillerman
- Mary McCormack as Michelle Ziegler
- Michael Jeter as Dale Porterhouse
- Hattie Winston as Angela Russel
- Penny Bae Bridges as Gail Beechum
- Frances Fisher as D.A. Cecilia Nussbaum
- Lucy Liu as a toy shop girl
- Jack Kehler as Mr. Ziegler
- Colman Domingo as Wally Cartwright

== Reception ==
True Crime was a large box-office bomb domestically; with an opening weekend gross of $5.3 million and a total domestic gross of $16.6 million, against a $55 million budget.

On the review aggregator website Rotten Tomatoes, 59% of 41 critics' reviews are positive, with an average rating of 6.1/10. The website's consensus reads: "True Crime has the potential for a gripping character-driven mystery, but a pedestrian story and a miscast Clint Eastwood undermine its effectiveness." Metacritic, which uses a weighted average, assigned the film a score of 64 out of 100, based on 26 critics, indicating "generally favorable" reviews. Audiences polled by CinemaScore gave the film an average grade of "B−" on an A+ to F scale.
