= Reign of Fire (film) =

2002 post-apocalyptic science fantasy action film by Rob Bowman

- Theatrical release poster
- Directed by: Rob Bowman
- Screenplay by: Gregg Chabot; Kevin Peterka; Matt Greenberg
- Story by: Gregg Chabot; Kevin Peterka
- Produced by: Richard D. Zanuck; Lili Fini Zanuck; Gary Barber; Roger Birnbaum
- Starring: Matthew McConaughey; Christian Bale; Izabella Scorupco; Gerard Butler
- Cinematography: Adrian Biddle
- Edited by: Declan McGrath; Thom Noble
- Music by: Edward Shearmur
- Production companies: Touchstone Pictures; Spyglass Entertainment; The Zanuck Company
- Distributed by: Buena Vista Pictures Distribution
- Release date: July 12, 2002
- Running time: 102 minutes
- Country: United States
- Language: English
- Budget: $60 million
- Box office: $82.2 million

Reign of Fire is a 2002 American post-apocalyptic science fantasy monster action film directed by Rob Bowman and starring Matthew McConaughey, Christian Bale, Izabella Scorupco and Gerard Butler with the screenplay written by Matt Greenberg, Gregg Chabot, and Kevin Peterka.

The film is set in England in the year 2020, eighteen years after a London Underground tunnelling project inadvertently awakened dragons from centuries of slumber and the creatures have subsequently replaced humans as the dominant species on Earth. With the fate of mankind at stake, two surviving parties, led by Quinn Abercromby (Bale) and Denton Van Zan (McConaughey), find that they must work together to hunt down and destroy the beasts in a desperate attempt to take back the world.

The film was released by Buena Vista Pictures through the Touchstone Pictures label on July 12, 2002. Upon release, it received mixed-to-negative reviews from critics and underperformed at the box office, grossing $82.2 million on a $60 million budget.

== Plot ==
In 2002, young Quinn Abercromby is visiting a London Underground construction project. Construction workers penetrate a cave and a dragon emerges from hibernation, incinerating the workers with its fire breath. The only survivor is Quinn, whose mother Karen, the project engineer, dies protecting him. The dragon flies out of the Underground and soon more dragons appear. The world's militaries fail to stop the spread of the dragon population and target large populated areas with nuclear weapons, leaving humans nearly extinct.

18 years later, in 2020, the dragons are dying off but have become increasingly aggressive in search of food. Quinn, along with his best friend Creedy, leads a community of last human survivors at Bamburgh Castle, Northumberland where he plans to outlast dragons until they return into hibernation; as insurance, he shares his notes and plans with Jared, an orphan he rescued and is mentoring to take over as community leader. The community is short on supplies, causing unrest pending the harvest of their meager crops. Eddie and some of his followers steal a truck to harvest the crops for food but are attacked by a dragon. Quinn, Creedy, and Jared repel the dragon, which burns most of the crops, leaving the community without food.

A group of heavily armed Americans led by Denton Van Zan then arrive in an armored convoy. Quinn is initially skeptical and suspects they are marauders, but Van Zan convinces him to let them stay when he reveals the dragons' main weakness: poor vision during twilight. With Quinn's help, Van Zan and his team slay the dragon who destroyed the crops.

Van Zan introduces Quinn to Alex Jensen, his team's helicopter pilot and intelligence officer, and briefs Quinn on their mission. After killing hundreds of dragons, Alex discovered they were all female; she postulates that they reproduce quickly because the species relies on a single male to fertilize all the eggs en masse. Having tracked the spread of the dragons, they believe that the male is in London and that if they kill it, the dragons will no longer be able to reproduce, effectively eradicating the species. Quinn, suspecting that the male dragon is the same one that killed his mother, refuses to help, knowing that London is infested with dragons and that if they fail, the dragons will track them back to their shelter.

Van Zan drafts the castle defenders, despite Quinn's objections. Van Zan, Alex, and some of the castle's men then depart for London, but true to Quinn's warnings, their caravan is attacked by the male dragon. Everyone except for Van Zan and Alex is killed. The dragon then finds the castle and attacks, killing many of its inhabitants. Quinn gets the survivors to an underground bunker, but they are trapped by rubble when the dragon returns; during this attack, Creedy is killed.

Van Zan and Alex return and free everyone trapped in the bunker. Quinn leaves Jared in charge and decides to help Van Zan and Alex hunt down the male dragon. They fly to London and find hundreds of female dragons; one is cannibalized by the much larger male out of hunger. This scatters the female dragons and leaves the male alone. Van Zan coordinates a plan: split up, bait the male into attacking, ground him with explosive crossbow bolts, and shoot one into his mouth once he is ground level. The plan initially works, but the dragon detonates the first explosive bolt early with its fire breath and Van Zan is swallowed whole. Quinn and Alex gather the last explosives and lure the dragon to ground level, where Quinn fires an explosive down the dragon's throat, killing it.

Three months later, Quinn and Alex erect a radio tower on a hill overlooking the North Sea, having seen no dragons since the battle in London. Jared arrives and reveals they have contact with French survivors who want to speak to the group's leader. Quinn declares Jared the new community leader and dedicates himself to rebuilding civilization with Alex.

== Cast ==
- Matthew McConaughey as Denton Van Zan
- Christian Bale as Quinn Abercromby
  - Ben Thornton as Young Quinn
- Izabella Scorupco as Alex Jensen
- Gerard Butler as Creedy
- Alice Krige as Karen Abercromby
- Scott Moutter as Jared Wilke
- David Kennedy as Eddie Stax
- Alexander Siddig as Ajay
- Ned Dennehy as Barlow
- Rory Keenan as Devon
- Terence Maynard as Gideon
- Doug Cockle as Goosh
- Randall Carlton as Burke
- Chris Kelly as Mead
- Jack Gleeson as "Kid" (uncredited)

== Production ==
Kevin Peterka and Gregg Chabot wrote the original screenplay in 1996, after which they sold it to Spyglass Media Group. In 2000, Matt Greenberg revised the screenplay for production. That July, Rob Bowman was chosen to direct the film.

Principal photography began in February 2001. Reign of Fire was filmed in Ireland's Wicklow Mountains, at the Glendasan Valley Lead Mines. Permission was given on the condition that the area not be damaged, and the crew removed all sets once filming was complete. However, an outbreak of foot-and-mouth disease in Europe stopped many planned scenes from being filmed due to quarantine restrictions.

The dead dragon was designed and built by Artem, with visual effects by Secret Lab. The dragon's digital effects posed a problem for animators:

"In recent years there have been several movies starring creatures with scaled surfaces. Among these are Jurassic Park, Dragonheart, and Lake Placid. The surfaces of these creatures have generally been constructed by layering painted textures atop displacement maps. This gives the model texture, but the scales stretch and shrink under the movement of the creature, giving a rubbery look that is not realistic."

In order to overcome this limitation, the then-groundbreaking work done by digital effects animator Neil Eskuri on Disney's 2000 release Dinosaur was utilized as a benchmark in order to create a realistic physical simulation of the dragon. According to Carlos Gonzalez-Ochoa, the film called for "100-foot (30 m) creatures with wing spans of 300 feet (91 m) that could undergo enormous speeds and accelerations. The artistic direction required each dragon to have wings that transition between a variety of physical behaviors and interact with the environment."

Alexander Siddig claimed in a 2015 A.V. Club interview that Matthew McConaughey insisted upon being referred to by his character's name on and off set, throughout production.

== Soundtrack ==
Reign of Fire: Original Motion Picture Soundtrack

Film score (Digital download / Audio CD) by Edward Shearmur
- Released: 23 July 2002
- Length: 50:30
- Label: Varèse Sarabande

Reign of Fire: Original Motion Picture Soundtrack
No.	Title	Length
1.	"Prologue"	3:22
2.	"Enter the Dragon"	3:20
3.	"An Early Harvest"	2:42
4.	"Field Attack"	4:11
5.	"Marauders"	2:47
6.	"Meet Van Zan"	3:49
7.	"Archangels"	3:58
8.	"Dawn Burial"	3:02
9.	"A Battle of Wills"	5:31
10.	"The Ruins at Pembury"	2:11
11.	"Inferno"	3:23
12.	"Return to London"	4:11
13.	"Magic Hour"	5:23
14.	"Rebirth"	2:40
Total length:		50:30

== Release ==
=== Home media ===
Reign of Fire was released on DVD and VHS on November 19, 2002. A Blu-ray version was released on February 13, 2007.

== Reception ==
=== Box office ===
Reign of Fire was ranked third at the US box-office receipts during its opening weekend (July 12, 2002), taking in $15,632,281, behind Road to Perdition and Men in Black II.

=== Critical response ===
On Rotten Tomatoes, the film has an approval rating of 42% based on 173 reviews. The site's consensus states: "Reign of Fire gains some altitude with its pyrotechnic action and a smolderingly campy Matthew McConaughey, but the feature's wings are clipped by a derivative script and visual effects that fizzle out." On Metacritic, it has a score of 39 out of 100, based on 30 reviews from critics. Audiences surveyed by CinemaScore gave the film a grade B on scale of A to F.

Joe Leydon of Variety said of the film, "An uncommonly exciting and satisfying post-apocalyptic popcorn flick, director Rob Bowman deftly combines an uncommonly satisfying mix of medieval fantasy, high-tech military action and Mad Max–style misadventure." Bruce Westbrook of Houston Chronicle described it as "a more enjoyable neo-dragon flick than 1981's Dragonslayer, with its lesser effects, or 1996's Dragonheart, with its soft heart for the monsters." Lisa Schwarzbaum of Entertainment Weekly gave the film a B grade, saying "the season could do with more grinning, spinning, un-self-important, happy-to-be-B throwback movies like this one." Elvis Mitchell of The New York Times noted that "the movie might have been a minor classic if it had maximized its own possibilities. But until the rush wears off, the picture is as much fun as a great run at a slot machine: even when your luck runs out, you're losing only pocket change."

Roger Ebert gave the film one star out of four, describing it as "a vast enterprise marshaled in the service of such a minute idea", adding that "the movie makes no sense on its own terms, let alone ours. And it is such a grim and dreary enterprise. One prays for a flower or a ray of sunshine as those grotty warriors clamber into their cellars and over their slag heaps."

=== Awards and nominations ===
Reign of Fire was nominated for one Saturn Award (but lost to The Lord of the Rings: The Two Towers) and two Sitges Film Festival awards, winning one.

Award	Category	Result	Ref.
Saturn Awards	Best Fantasy Film	Nominated	
Sitges Film Festival Awards	Best Visual Effects	Won	
Sitges Film Festival Awards	Best Film	Nominated	

== Video game ==
In 2002, Kuju Entertainment released the video game adaptation Reign of Fire for all major sixth-generation platforms. All versions received mixed reviews, much like the film it was based on.

== Cancelled sequel ==
In a 2002 interview, Christian Bale was asked: "Is there a sequel possibility to Reign of Fire?" to which Bale responded: "Possibly. I told Scott Moutter, who plays my stepson in the movie, that he's well positioned to take the sequel from me because of the way the movie ends!". However, due to the film underperforming at the box office, no development on a sequel has been spoken of since. Twenty years later, Bale joked that a sequel would be made "for Dexerto's eyes only."

== Legacy ==
The mechanism of dragon's fire breath in this movie, inspired from biology of real-life creatures such as anti-predator adaptation of bombardier beetle and poison glands of vipers, was used in later works such as Harry Potter and the Goblet of Fire, Gods of Egypt, and Game of Thrones.
