= Rules of Engagement (film) =

2000 film by William Friedkin

- Theatrical release poster
- Directed by: William Friedkin
- Screenplay by: Stephen Gaghan
- Story by: James Webb
- Produced by: Scott Rudin; Richard D. Zanuck
- Starring: Tommy Lee Jones; Samuel L. Jackson; Guy Pearce; Bruce Greenwood; Blair Underwood; Philip Baker Hall; Anne Archer; Ben Kingsley
- Cinematography: William A. Fraker; Nicola Pecorini
- Edited by: Augie Hess
- Music by: Mark Isham
- Production companies: Scott Rudin Productions; Seven Arts Pictures; The Zanuck Company
- Distributed by: Paramount Pictures (Note: Paramount Pictures handled distribution in the United States, while Helkon Filmverleih and Buena Vista International handled distribution in Germany.)
- Release date: April 7, 2000
- Running time: 127 minutes
- Countries: United States; Germany
- Languages: English; Arabic; Vietnamese
- Budget: $60 million
- Box office: $71.7 million

Rules of Engagement is a 2000 American war legal drama film directed by William Friedkin, written by Stephen Gaghan, from a story by Jim Webb, and starring Tommy Lee Jones and Samuel L. Jackson. Jackson plays U.S. Marine Colonel Terry Childers, who is brought to court-martial after Marines under his orders kill a large number of civilians outside the U.S. embassy in Yemen.

Rules of Engagement was released by Paramount Pictures on April 7, 2000. The film received mixed to negative reviews from critics and grossed $71.7 million against a $60 million budget.

== Plot ==
In 1968, during the Vietnam War, a disastrous American advance leaves U.S. Marine Lieutenant Hayes Hodges wounded and his men dead. His fellow platoon leader Lieutenant Terry Childers executes a North Vietnamese prisoner to intimidate a captive officer into calling off an ambush on Hodges' position; sparing the officer's life, Childers rescues Hodges. In 1996, Hodges, now a colonel, is set to retire after 28 years as a JAG officer. At his pre-retirement party at the Camp Lejeune Officers Club, he is honored by his old friend Childers, now a colonel and the commanding officer of a Marine Expeditionary Unit.

Childers and his unit are deployed to Southwest Asia as part of an Amphibious Readiness Group, called to evacuate the U.S. Ambassador to Yemen when a routine anti-American demonstration at the embassy turns violent. Escorting Ambassador Mourain and his family safely to a helicopter, Childers retrieves the embassy's American flag before they depart. Things turn for the worse when demonstrators begin shooting at the Marines, resulting in three fatalities. Childers orders his men to open fire on the crowd, resulting in 83 deaths and over 100 injured, most of whom were civilians.

American diplomatic relations in the Middle East severely deteriorate after this, so U.S. National Security Advisor Bill Sokal pressures the military to court-martial Childers, hoping to salvage relations by placing all blame for the incident on the colonel. Childers asks Hodges to serve as his defense attorney, and he reluctantly accepts. Hodges rejects a plea deal from the prosecutor, Major Biggs, who is convinced of Childers' guilt but privately refuses to consider the death penalty. With little time to prepare a defense, Hodges goes to Yemen, where hostile witnesses and police claim that the Marines fired first on the unarmed crowd. Visiting the abandoned embassy and some of the wounded, he notices an undamaged security camera and scattered audio cassette tapes.

Returning to the U.S., Hodges confronts Childers about the complete lack of evidence to support his version of events, resulting in a fistfight. Sokal burns a videotape revealing the crowd was armed and fired on the Marines first. He also forces Mourain to lie on the stand that the crowd was peaceful and that Childers ignored his orders and was violent and disrespectful to him and his family. Hodges meets with Mourain's wife, who admits Childers acted valiantly but refuses to testify. Captain Lee, who hesitated to follow Childers' order, is unable to testify to having seen gunfire from the crowd. A Yemeni doctor testifies that the tapes Hodges found are propaganda inciting violence against Americans but declares the protest was peaceful.

With Sokal on the stand, Hodges presents a shipping manifest proving that the tape from the undamaged camera was delivered to Sokal's office but disappeared, with footage that would likely have exonerated Childers. Taking the stand, Childers explains that he was the only surviving Marine able to see the crowd was armed. On cross-examination, Biggs goads Childers into admitting that he ordered his men to open fire by shouting "waste the motherfuckers". Childers argues that he would not sacrifice the lives of his men to appease the likes of Biggs, to Hodges' dismay.

The prosecution presents Colonel Binh Le Cao, the Vietnamese officer whose life he spared, as a rebuttal witness, testifying that Childers executed an unarmed prisoner of war. During Hodges' cross-examination, Cao agrees that Childers took action to save American lives and that, if circumstances were reversed, Cao would have done the same. After the trial, Hodges confronts Sokal about the missing tape, vowing to uncover the truth. Childers is found guilty of the minor charge of breach of peace but cleared of conduct unbecoming an officer and murder; Biggs approaches Hodges about investigating Childers' actions in Vietnam, but Hodges declines to testify. Leaving the courthouse, Cao and Childers salute each other.

An epilogue reveals that Sokal was found guilty of destroying evidence and Mourain of perjury, both losing their jobs, while Childers retired honorably.

== Cast ==
- Tommy Lee Jones as Colonel Hayes Hodges
- Samuel L. Jackson as Colonel Terry L. Childers
- Guy Pearce as Major Mark Biggs
- Bruce Greenwood as Bill Sokal
- Blair Underwood as Captain Lee
- Philip Baker Hall as General H. Lawrence Hodges
- Anne Archer as Mrs. Mourain
- Ben Kingsley as Ambassador Mourain
- Nicky Katt as Hayes Lawrence Hodges III
- Dale Dye as Major General Perry
- Mark Feuerstein as Captain Tom Chandler
- Amidou as Doctor Ahmar
- Richard McGonagle as the judge
- Ryan Hurst as Captain Hustings
- Gordon Clapp as Harris

In addition, Baoan Coleman portrays retired NVA Colonel Binh Le Cao, while G. Gordon Liddy has a cameo as a talk show host. This was also one of the last movie roles that David Graf played before dying from a heart attack the following year.

== Production ==
=== Development ===
The script was based on an original screenplay by future U.S. senator James Webb. It had previously been in development at Universal Pictures for about ten years before being acquired by Paramount Pictures, where the script was further developed under producer Scott Rudin, with Sylvester Stallone in talks to star in the film. William Friedkin was hired to direct, but had trouble collaborating with Webb on script rewrites. Rudin passed the project over to Richard Zanuck, who then hired Stephen Gaghan to rewrite the screenplay. Gaghan dived into the project, reading Tim O'Brien's novels "The Things They Carried" and "Going After Cacciato", and watching the 1957 film Paths of Glory. Webb hated Gaghan's work and frustrated the filmmaker's attempts to receive cooperation from the Department of Defense, which was eventually obtained nonetheless.

=== Filming ===
Location shooting took place in Ouarzazate, Morocco, Nokesville, Virginia, Warrenton, Virginia (military base scenes), Hunting Island, South Carolina (Vietnam scenes), and Mount Washington, Virginia (Gen. Hodges' estate scenes).

The film was assisted in its production by the United States Department of Defense and the United States Marine Corps.

== Reception ==
=== Box office ===
During its opening weekend, Rules of Engagement beat out Erin Brockovich and Return to Me to reach the number one spot, collecting $15 million. The film then made $10.9 million for its next weekend, maintaining the top spot ahead of newcomers 28 Days and Keeping the Faith. It fell into third place behind U-571 and Love & Basketball in its third weekend with $8 million. After its theatrical run, it earned $61.3 million domestically and a worldwide total of $71.7 million.

=== Critical response ===
On the review aggregator website Rotten Tomatoes, 37% of 97 critics' reviews are positive, with an average rating of 5/10. The site's critical consensus reads: "The script is unconvincing and the courtroom action is unengaging." On Metacritic, it has a score of 45% based on reviews from 31 critics, indicating "mixed or average reviews". Audiences surveyed by CinemaScore gave the film a grade "A−" on scale of A to F.

Roger Ebert of the Chicago Sun-Times, gave it two and a half out of four stars, praising its "expert melodrama" while criticizing an "infuriating screenplay". Peter Bradshaw of The Guardian wrote that the film was "lazily plotted, grotesquely dishonest, and dripping with a creepy strain of Islamophobia". Charles Gittins, writing from a legal perspective for CNN, wrote that "the movie succeeds in capturing the details of a successful military operation and showing the possible political fallout from such an operation. The drama lags, however, once it enters the courtroom where Rules of Engagement is neither accurate nor compelling."

The American-Arab Anti-Discrimination Committee described it as "probably the most racist film ever made against Arabs by Hollywood", comparing it to The Birth of a Nation and The Eternal Jew. Director William Friedkin dismissed accusations that the film was racist:

Let me state right up front, the film is not anti-Arab, is not anti-Muslim and is certainly not anti-Yemen. In order to make the film in Morocco, the present King of Morocco had to read the script and approve it and sign his name ... and nobody participating from the Arab side of things felt that the film was anti-Arab. The film is anti-terrorist. It takes a strong stand against terrorism and it says that terrorism wears many faces ... but we haven't made this film to slander the government of Yemen. It's a democracy and I don't believe for a moment they support terrorists any more than America does.

Friedkin later stated the film "was a box office hit but many critics saw it as jingoism". He says that James Webb later saw the film on the recommendation of his friend Colonel David Hackworth; Webb then rang Friedkin to say how much he liked it.

Jack G. Shaheen in a review for the Washington Report on Middle East Affairs called it "the most blatantly racist movie I have ever seen". Another review in Senses of Cinema said that the "political perspective of Rules of Engagement seems to belong to another era altogether. It carries an almost anachronistic fondness for the war in Vietnam, and seems intent on validating America's involvement in the conflict".

== See also ==
- Trial movies

== Bibliography ==
- Clagett, Thomas D. (2003). "12 Angry Men and Rules of Engagement". William Friedkin: Films of Aberration, Obsession and Reality. Silman-James Press. pp. 363–386. ISBN 978-1-879505-61-2.
- Semmerling, Tim Jon (2006). "Attack from the Multicultural Front (2000): Rules of Engagement". 'Evil' Arabs in American Popular Film: Orientalist Fear. University of Texas Press. ISBN 978-0-292-71342-0.
