= Rich in Love (1992 film) =

- Theatrical release poster
- Directed by: Bruce Beresford
- Screenplay by: Alfred Uhry
- Based on: Rich in Love; 1987 novel by Josephine Humphreys
- Produced by: Richard D. Zanuck; Lili Fini Zanuck
- Starring: Albert Finney; Jill Clayburgh; Kathryn Erbe; Kyle MacLachlan; Piper Laurie; Ethan Hawke; Suzy Amis; Alfre Woodard
- Cinematography: Peter James
- Edited by: Mark Warner
- Music by: Georges Delerue
- Production company: The Zanuck Company
- Distributed by: Metro-Goldwyn-Mayer
- Release dates: October 1992 (Chicago); October 29, 1992 (Limited); March 5, 1993 (United States); May 7, 1993 (United Kingdom); May 27, 1993 (Australia)
- Running time: 105 minutes
- Country: United States
- Budget: $18 million
- Box office: $2.2 million

Rich in Love is a 1992 American drama film directed by Bruce Beresford, and starring Albert Finney, Kathryn Erbe, Kyle MacLachlan, Jill Clayburgh, Suzy Amis, Ethan Hawke, Alfre Woodard and Piper Laurie. It is based on the 1987 novel Rich in Love by Josephine Humphreys.

== Plot ==
The Odom family lives in Mount Pleasant, South Carolina, just off Bennett Street, looking out onto Charleston Harbor. Lucille Odom is nearing the end of her last year of high school when her mother, Helen Odom, leaves the family, breaking all ties. Lucille is left to care for her recently retired father, Warren Odom.

The family spends the summer trying to get their lives together, which is complicated when the older daughter of the family, Rae, moves back home with a new husband and a baby on the way, about which Rae has mixed feelings. While reminiscing about their mother, Rae tells Lucille that their mother tried to abort Lucille when she was pregnant. Warren notices his daughters in new and different ways now that his wife is gone and he is no longer working. Everything changes for Lucille as she comes-of-age and learns about her family in new ways.

== Cast ==
- Albert Finney as Warren Odom
- Jill Clayburgh as Helen Odom
- Kathryn Erbe as Lucille Odom
- Kyle MacLachlan as Billy McQueen
- Piper Laurie as Vera Delmage
- Ethan Hawke as Wayne Frobiness
- Suzy Amis as Rae Odom
- Ramona Ward as Sharon
- Alfre Woodard as Rhody Poole

== Production ==
The film was set and produced in Mount Pleasant, South Carolina. Some additional footage was shot across the Cooper River in Charleston.

== Reception ==
While the film received mostly positive reviews, it was a major box office failure. One drawback was that many did not find the story believable, as the family's problems and a happy ending were something of a fantasy. For example, Roger Ebert of the Chicago Sun-Times gave the film three stars out of four, writing "I must confess I didn't much believe the story".

On the review aggregator website Rotten Tomatoes, 69% of 13 critics' reviews are positive.

== Home media ==
The film was released on DVD via Amazon’s On-Demand service on December 15, 2009.
