= Richard D. Zanuck =

American film producer (1934–2012)

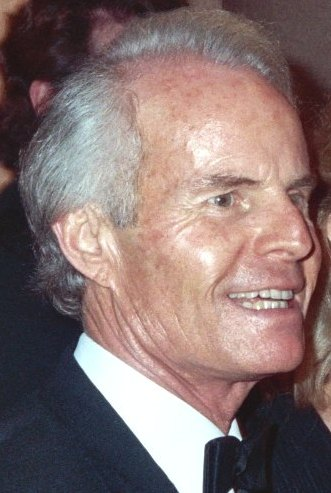
- Zanuck at the 1990 Academy Awards
- Born: Richard Darryl Zanuck; December 13, 1934; Los Angeles, California, U.S.
- Died: July 13, 2012 (aged 77); Los Angeles, California, U.S.
- Occupation: Film producer
- Years active: 1956–2012
- Spouses: Lili Gentle (m. 1958; div. 1969); Linda Harrison (m. 1969; div. 1978); Lili Fini (m. 1978)
- Children: 4, including Dean
- Parents: Darryl F. Zanuck (father); Virginia Fox (mother)

Richard Darryl Zanuck (/ˈzænək/ ZAN-ək; December 13, 1934 – July 13, 2012) was an American film producer. His 1989 film Driving Miss Daisy won the Academy Award for Best Picture. He was also instrumental in launching the careers of directors Ron Howard and Steven Spielberg; the latter described Zanuck as a "director's producer" and "one of the most honorable and loyal men of our profession."

== Early life and career ==
Richard Darryl Zanuck was born in Los Angeles to actress Virginia Fox and Darryl F. Zanuck, then head of production for 20th Century Fox. He was the youngest of three children. He had two elder sisters, Darrylin (1931–2015) and Susan (1933–1980). While studying at Stanford University, he began his career in the film industry working for the 20th Century Fox story department. In 1959, Zanuck had his first shot at producing with the film Compulsion. In the 1960s, Zanuck became the president of 20th Century Fox. One year of his tenure was chronicled by John Gregory Dunne in The Studio. After failures like 1967's Doctor Dolittle, he was dismissed by his father and joined Warner Bros. as Executive Vice President.

In 1972, Zanuck joined with David Brown to form an independent production company called the Zanuck/Brown Company at Universal Pictures. Their first big hit was The Sting (1973), which won the Academy Award for Best Picture in April 1974. The two men produced a pair of Steven Spielberg's early films, The Sugarland Express (1974) and Jaws (1975). They subsequently produced such box office hits as Cocoon (1985) and Driving Miss Daisy (1989) before dissolving their partnership in 1988 when he partnered with Jerry Perenchio to start The Zanuck Company. They were jointly awarded the Irving G. Thalberg Memorial Award by the Academy of Motion Picture Arts and Sciences in 1990. He worked with Tim Burton six times, producing Burton's adaptation of Planet of the Apes (2001), Big Fish (2003), Charlie and the Chocolate Factory (2005), Sweeney Todd: The Demon Barber of Fleet Street (2007), Alice in Wonderland (2010), and Dark Shadows (2012). He and Burton connected immediately, and Zanuck was Burton's producer of choice. In a May 2012 interview, Zanuck told Variety: "A producer should contribute from the very beginning until the very end, in all aspects. I'm there at the set every day, on every shot. Not that the director, particularly Tim [Burton], needs me, but just in case."

== Personal life ==
Zanuck married three times. On January 14, 1958, he married Lili Charlene Gentle (b. March 4, 1940), an actress from Birmingham, Alabama, and a second cousin of actress Tallulah Bankhead. The marriage, which produced two daughters, Virginia Lorraine Zanuck (born 1959) and Janet Beverly Zanuck (born 1960), was dissolved in 1968.

On October 26, 1969, Zanuck and his protégé, actress Linda Harrison, together with his friend, producer Sy Bartlett, and Harrison's sister Kay, flew to Las Vegas, where Zanuck married Harrison on a balcony of the Sands Hotel. The marriage became difficult after Harrison failed to garner the role of the wife in Zanuck's production of Jaws.

In mid-1977, as a result of his second wife's entanglement with a 65-year-old "guru", Vincentii Turriziani of the Risen Christ Foundation, and the alleged guru's claims and demands for money from Zanuck, he filed for divorce and was awarded custody of his two sons, Harrison Richard Zanuck (born 1971) and Dean Francis Zanuck (born 1972).

In a 1985 interview, Zanuck said that career problems contributed to his two failed marriages. "Both girls were actresses, and neither one was well established," he said. As head of 20th Century Fox, "It was tough to try to be fair to the project and also try to help them in their careers. If I didn't give them the role, then I had to explain why they weren't right for it. It wasn't the major problem in the marriages, but it was an underlying source of discomfort."

On September 23, 1978, Zanuck married his third wife, Lili Fini (born 1954), a former World Bank employee and Carnation Co. office manager, who helped him raise his sons from his second marriage, and would co-produce some of his most memorable films, including Cocoon (1985), Driving Miss Daisy (1989), and Reign of Fire (2002). When the Zanucks won the Best Picture Oscar in 1989 for Driving Miss Daisy, Lili Fini Zanuck was only the second woman in history to have earned an Oscar for Best Picture. In 1998, she directed an episode of the HBO miniseries From the Earth to the Moon, titled "We Have Cleared the Tower", and in 2000, Richard and Lili Fini Zanuck co-produced the 72nd Academy Awards ceremony.

== Death ==
Zanuck died from a heart attack at his home on July 13, 2012, at the age of 77. His mansion, located in the Beverly Park section of Los Angeles, was sold for $20.1 million later that year. On February 25, 2014, 20th Century Fox opened the Richard D. Zanuck Production Building at its Los Angeles studios. "Richard was a true giant of our industry for over five decades", Fox chairman and CEO Jim Gianopulos said at the dedication ceremony. "He was family, and an integral part of our legacy. We couldn't find a building worthy of him, so we built one." The ceremony was attended by Zanuck's widow, Lili Fini Zanuck, his sons, and four of his nine grandchildren.

== Filmography ==
He was a producer in all films unless otherwise noted.

=== Film ===
==== Credited as producer ====
- Compulsion (1959)
- Sanctuary (1961)
- The Chapman Report (1962)
- Willie Dynamite (1973)
- The Sugarland Express (1974)
- The Girl from Petrovka (1974)
- Jaws (1975)
- Jaws 2 (1978)
- The Island (1980)
- Neighbors (1981)
- The Verdict (1982)
- Cocoon (1985)
- Target (1985)
- Cocoon: The Return (1988)
- Driving Miss Daisy (1989)
- Rush (1991)
- Rich in Love (1992)
- Clean Slate (1994)
- Wild Bill (1995)
- Mulholland Falls (1996)
- Deep Impact (1998)
- True Crime (1999)
- Rules of Engagement (2000)
- Planet of the Apes (2001)
- Road to Perdition (2002)
- Reign of Fire (2002)
- Big Fish (2003)
- Charlie and the Chocolate Factory (2005)
- Sweeney Todd: The Demon Barber of Fleet Street (2007)
- Yes Man (2008)
- Alice in Wonderland (2010)
- Dark Shadows (2012) (final film)
- Hidden (2015) (posthumous, uncredited)

==== Credited as executive producer ====
- The Sound of Music (1965) (uncredited)
- Butch Cassidy and the Sundance Kid (1969) (uncredited)
- Sssssss (1973)
- The Sting (1973) (uncredited)
- The Black Windmill (1974)
- The Eiger Sanction (1975)
- MacArthur (1977)
- Chain Reaction (1996)
- Clash of the Titans (2010)

==== Other film credits ====
Credited as miscellaneous crew
Year	Film	Role	Notes
1963	Cleopatra	Studio executive	Uncredited
1965	The Sound of Music	Studio executive	Uncredited
1966	The Sand Pebbles	Studio executive	Uncredited
1967	Doctor Dolittle	Studio executive	Uncredited
1969	Patton	Studio executive	Uncredited
1970	M*A*S*H	Studio executive	Uncredited
1970	Tora! Tora! Tora!	Studio executive	Uncredited
1971	The French Connection	Studio executive	Uncredited

Credited as production manager
Year	Film	Role	Notes
1970	Tora! Tora! Tora!	Executive in charge of production	Uncredited

Credited as "Thanks"
Year	Film	Notes
2013	The Zero Theorem	In the memory of the great
2014	The Grand Budapest Hotel	Special thanks: Our old friends
2014	Escobar: Paradise Lost	In loving memory of

=== Television ===
Television credits for Richard Zanuck
Year	Production	Credit	Notes
1987	CBS Summer Playhouse	Executive producer	
1992	Driving Miss Daisy	Executive producer	Television film
2000	72nd Academy Awards		Television special
2004	Dead Lawyers	Executive producer	Television film
2015	Bessie	Executive producer	Television film Posthumous credit

== Awards and nominations ==
Year	Award	Category	Film	Result
2015	Primetime Emmy Award	Outstanding Television Movie	Bessie	Won
2011	Golden Globe Award	Best Film	Alice in Wonderland	Nominated
2009	Camerimage	Special Award to the Producer of Visually Outstanding Films		Won
2007	Broadcast Film Critics Association	Best Film	Sweeney Todd: The Demon Barber of Fleet Street	Nominated
2007	Golden Globe Award	Best Motion Picture - Musical or Comedy	Sweeney Todd: The Demon Barber of Fleet Street	Won
2007	Saturn Award	Best Horror Film	Sweeney Todd: The Demon Barber of Fleet Street	Won
2005	British Academy Children's Awards	Best Film	Charlie and the Chocolate Factory	Nominated
2005	Saturn Award	Best Film	Charlie and the Chocolate Factory	Nominated
2004	British Academy of Film and Television Arts	Best Film	Big Fish	Nominated
2004	Palm Springs International Film Festival	Lifetime Achievement Award		Won
2002	Producers Guild of America Award	Best Theatrical Motion Picture	Road to Perdition	Nominated
2002	Golden Raspberry Awards	Worst Remake or Sequel	Planet of the Apes (2001 film)	Won
2001	ShoWest Convention, USA	Producer of the Year		Won
2000	Primetime Emmy Award	Outstanding Variety, Music, or Comedy Special	72nd Academy Awards	Nominated
1998	Hollywood Film Festival	Outstanding Achievement in Producing		Won
1993	Producers Guild of America Award	Lifetime Achievement Award in Motion Pictures		Won
1991	British Academy of Film and Television Arts	Best Film	Driving Miss Daisy	Nominated
1990	Academy Award	Irving G. Thalberg Memorial Award		Won
1990	Academy Award	Best Picture	Driving Miss Daisy	Won
1990	Golden Globe Award	Best Picture– Musical or Comedy	Driving Miss Daisy	Won
1990	National Board of Review of Motion Pictures	Best Film	Driving Miss Daisy	Won
1990	Producers Guild of America Award	Best Theatrical Motion Picture	Driving Miss Daisy	Won
1990	Producers Guild of America Award	Outstanding Producer of Theatrical Motion Pictures	Driving Miss Daisy	Won
1983	Academy Award	Best Picture	The Verdict	Nominated
1976	Academy Award	Best Picture	Jaws	Nominated
1968	Hollywood Walk of Fame	Hollywood Walk of Fame Star	Television	Won
