= Rush (1991 film) =

1991 film directed by Lili Fini Zanuck

- Theatrical Poster
- Directed by: Lili Fini Zanuck
- Screenplay by: Pete Dexter
- Based on: the novel by Kim Wozencraft
- Produced by: Gary Daigler; Richard D. Zanuck
- Starring: Jason Patric; Jennifer Jason Leigh; Sam Elliott; Max Perlich; Gregg Allman; Tony Frank
- Cinematography: Kenneth MacMillan
- Edited by: Mark Warner
- Music by: Eric Clapton
- Production company: The Zanuck Company
- Distributed by: Metro-Goldwyn-Mayer
- Release date: December 22, 1991
- Running time: 120 minutes
- Country: United States
- Language: English
- Budget: $17 million
- Box office: $7.2 million

Rush is a 1991 American neo noir crime drama film directed by Lili Fini Zanuck and based on a novel written by Kim Wozencraft. It stars Jennifer Jason Leigh and Jason Patric as two undercover Texas police officers in the 1970s. They become drug addicts themselves and, under pressure from the chief of police, falsify evidence in some cases. The book and film are both based on a 1978–79 drug scandal involving the Tyler, Texas police department and Smith County, Texas Sheriff's Office. An FBI investigation led to the book's author and her partner pleading guilty to perjury, serving time in federal prison, and testifying in a federal civil rights case against Tyler police chief Willie Hardy, who was found not guilty.

== Plot ==
In the coastal petroleum refinery town of Katterly outside of Houston, Texas, Seasoned undercover narcotics officer Jim Raynor is told by his superior, Captain Dodd, to choose a partner from a group of recent police academy graduates for a planned undercover investigation. Raynor chooses the only female applicant, Kristen Cates. Though uneasy, Dodd approves Raynor's choice.

Raynor explains to Cates that they will be deep undercover, dependent on each other to not get killed during the investigation. Though initially startled by Raynor's intensity, Cates insists she is capable of doing whatever it takes to get the job done. Later at Raynor's apartment, he teaches Cates how to inject drugs, claiming that he is using a harmless powder for demonstration purposes. Raynor informs Cates that she will be put in situations where she will have to take the drugs in order to convince dealers she is not a cop. He insists that if she tries to fake drug use in front of dealers, she will get both of them killed.

The main target of the operation is local businessman Will Gaines. The chief of police insists that Gaines is the main drug boss in the town, but Gaines is deeply mistrustful of Raynor and Cates.

As Raynor predicted, Cates is put into a position where she is forced to inject drugs in front of a dealer. Over the course of the investigation, buying drugs all over town, Cates and Raynor begin using drugs for more reasons than maintaining their cover.

Though they have successfully infiltrated the town's drug underworld, Raynor and Cates are unable to make a buy from Gaines. Under pressure from the chief and sergeant, they falsify evidence against Gaines in order to secure his arrest.

The night before Gaines trial is to begin, Cates is startled awake by a double barrel shotgun caressing her face. A gunfight ensues, in which Raynor is shot in the thigh, striking his femoral artery. Cates returns fire and runs to a neighbor's house shouting for help, then returns to the trailer to find Raynor barely conscious. He dies in her arms.

At the grand jury, Cates is on the witness stand. During her testimony, she mentions that she has resigned from the police force. Her testimony sticks to the fabricated story Raynor and she concocted. Gaines is later indicted. However, at trial, Cates takes the stand to testify. When she looks directly at Gaines, he slides two fingers down the bridge of his nose, mimicking the movement of the shotgun that eventually killed Raynor. Stunned, Cates retracts her statements about Gaines's involvement in the drug trade, and testifies that they were ordered to fabricate evidence by the chief of police. This secures Gaines's acquittal.

Freed from police custody, Gaines gets into his car a few nights later. As he drives down the road, he notices someone hiding in the backseat. Gaines pulls over, and as he turns to confront them, he is killed by a double barrel shotgun blast to the face. The killer is never shown.

== Cast ==
- Jason Patric as Detective Jim Raynor
- Jennifer Jason Leigh as Detective Kristen Cates
- Gregg Allman as Will Gaines
- Sam Elliott as Captain Larry Dodd
- Max Perlich as Walker
- Tony Frank as Chief Nettle
- William Sadler as Monroe
- Special K. McCray as Willie Red
- Jimmy Ray Pickens as Dealer In Disco
- Dennis Letts as Senior District Attorney
- Dennis Burkley as Motorcycle Guy #1
- Glenn Wilson as Motorcycle Guy #2
- Merrill Connally as Defense Attorney
- Michael Kirkland as Grand Jury District Attorney
- Connie Cooper as Judge
- John Ray Harrison as Mayor
- Suzanne Savoy as Dodd's Wife
- Thomas Rosales Jr. as Wino

== Soundtrack ==
Eric Clapton's Grammy-winning song "Tears in Heaven" is featured on the soundtrack, but not in the film. Clapton wrote the film's score and performed on it. The soundtrack includes Clapton's guitar and vocals on "Tears in Heaven" and "Help Me Up"; Clapton and Buddy Guy also perform "Don't Know Which Way to Go".

Other songs featured in the film (but not on the soundtrack album) include Charlie Terrell's version of the Willie Dixon classic "Wang Dang Doodle", Jimi Hendrix's "All Along the Watchtower" (composed by Bob Dylan), Lynyrd Skynyrd's "Free Bird", Freddy Fender's "Before the Next Teardrop Falls", Robin Trower's "Bridge of Sighs", The Ohio Players' "Love Rollercoaster", and Johnny Winter's "Rock and Roll Hoochie Koo" (composed by Rick Derringer).

== Reception ==
The film was met with generally positive reviews, with a 72% fresh rating on Rotten Tomatoes based on 29 reviews with an average score of 6.2 out of 10.

The film is recognized by American Film Institute in these lists:

- 2004: AFI's 100 Years...100 Songs:
  - "Tears in Heaven" – Nominated
