= List of awards and nominations received by Holly Hunter =

Compilation of achievements

Holly Hunter awards and nominations
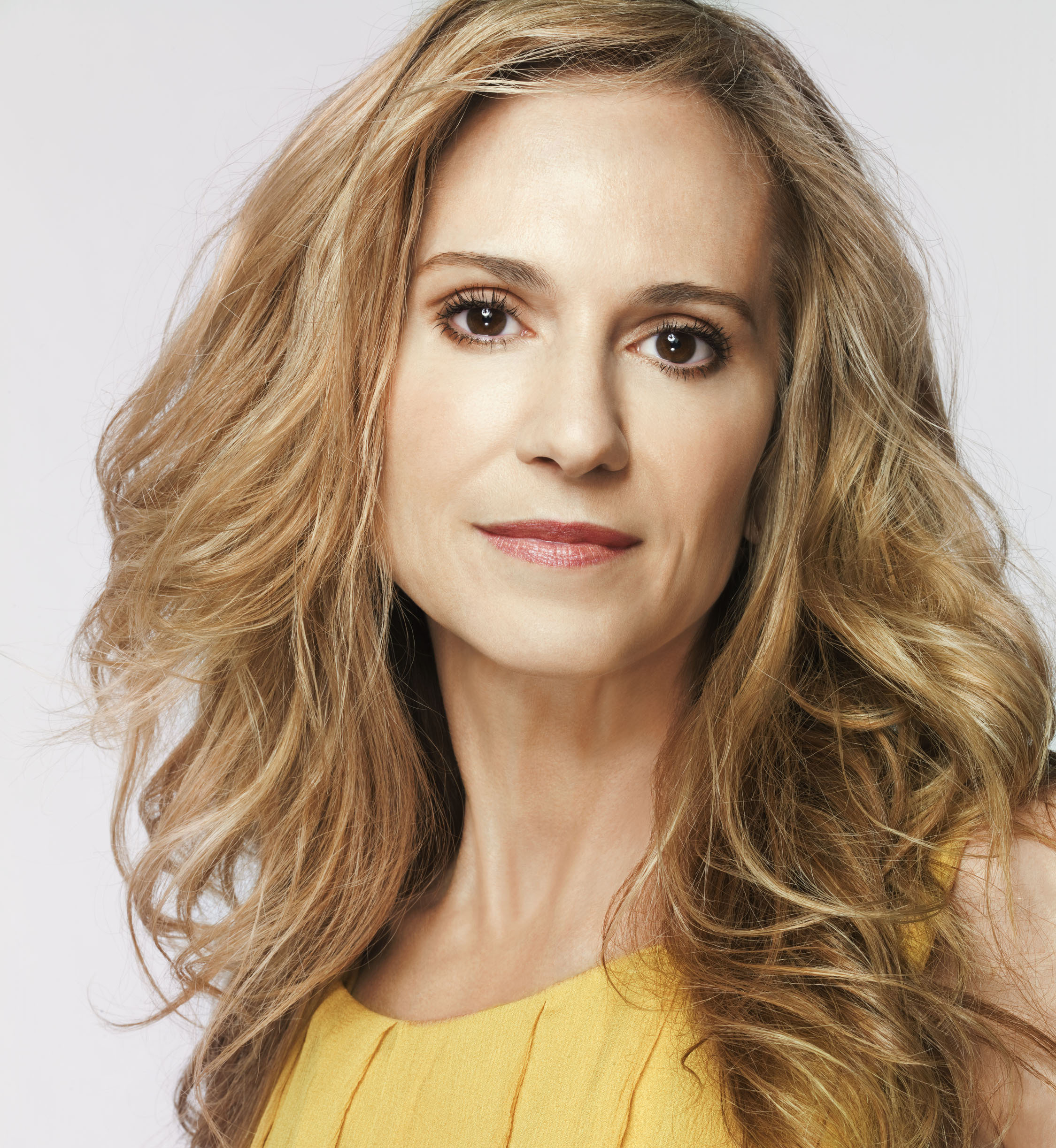
- Hunter in 2010
Awards and nominations
Award	Wins	Nominations
Academy Awards	1	4
British Academy Film Awards	1	3
Golden Globes	1	7
Primetime Emmy Awards	2	7
SAG-AFTRA's Actor Awards	0	7

Totals (Note: Certain award groups do not simply award one winner. They acknowledge several different recipients, have runners-up, and have third place. Since this is a specific recognition and is different from losing an award, runner-up mentions are considered wins in this award tally. For simplification and to avoid errors, each award in this list has been presumed to have had a prior nomination.)
- Wins: 40
- Nominations: 112

American actress Holly Hunter has received numerous accolades throughout her career.

Hunter achieved her breakthrough in 1987, taking on the lead role of Jane Craig in the film Broadcast News, earning her first nominations at the Academy Awards and Golden Globes, while also winning the Silver Bear for Best Actress at the Berlin International Film Festival. For her performance as Ada McGrath, a mute Scottish woman, in the 1993 period drama film The Piano directed by Jane Campion, she won the Academy Award for Best Actress as well as the corresponding prizes at the AACTA Awards, BAFTA Awards, Cannes Film Festival, and Golden Globe Awards. During the same year she had a supporting role in the legal thriller The Firm, for which she was nominated for the Academy Award and BAFTA Award for Best Supporting Actress. The 2003 teen drama film Thirteen garnered her further nominations at the Academy Awards, BAFTA Awards and Golden Globe Awards, while her work in the 2017 romantic comedy The Big Sick earned her two nominations at the Actor Awards. She has also been recognized for her voice acting as Helen Parr / Elastigirl in the Pixar animated film The Incredibles (2004) and its sequel Incredibles 2 (2018), achieving an Annie Award nomination for the latter.

For her work on television, Hunter has won two Primetime Emmy Awards for Outstanding Lead Actress in a Miniseries or a Movie for the television films Roe vs. Wade (1989) and The Positively True Adventures of the Alleged Texas Cheerleader-Murdering Mom (1993). She received additional Emmy nominations for Harlan County War, Things You Can Tell Just by Looking at Her (both 2000), When Billie Beat Bobby (2001), and Saving Grace (2007–2010).

== Accolades ==
Awards and nominations received by Holly Hunter
Award	Year	Nominated work	Category	Result	Ref.
Academy Awards	1988	Broadcast News	Best Actress	Nominated	
Academy Awards	1994	The Piano	Best Actress	Won	
Academy Awards	1994	The Firm	Best Supporting Actress	Nominated	
Academy Awards	2004	Thirteen	Best Supporting Actress	Nominated	
AARP Movies for Grownups Awards	2018	The Big Sick	Best Supporting Actress	Nominated	
American Comedy Awards	1988	Broadcast News	Funniest Leading Actress in a Motion Picture	Nominated	
American Comedy Awards	1999	Living Out Loud	Funniest Leading Actress in a Motion Picture	Nominated	
Annie Awards	2019	Incredibles 2	Best Voice Acting in a Feature Production	Nominated	
Austin Film Critics Association Awards	2018	The Big Sick	Best Supporting Actress	Nominated	
AACTA Awards	1993	The Piano	Best Actress in a Leading Role	Won	
Berlin International Film Festival Awards	1988	Broadcast News	Silver Bear for Best Actress	Won	
Boston Film Festival Awards	1998	—	Film Excellence Award	Won	
Boston Society of Film Critics Awards	1988	Broadcast News	Best Actress	Won	
Boston Society of Film Critics Awards	1993	The Piano	Best Actress	Won	
British Academy Film Awards	1994	The Piano	Best Actress in a Leading Role	Won	
British Academy Film Awards	1994	The Firm	Best Actress in a Supporting Role	Nominated	
British Academy Film Awards	2004	Thirteen	Best Actress in a Supporting Role	Nominated	
CableACE Awards	1993	Crazy in Love	Best Actress in a Movie or Miniseries	Nominated	
CableACE Awards	1994	The Positively True Adventures of the Alleged Texas Cheerleader-Murdering Mom	Best Actress in a Movie or Miniseries	Won	
Cannes Film Festival Awards	1993	The Piano	Best Actress	Won	
Chicago Film Critics Association Awards	1994	The Piano	Best Actress	Won	
Chicago Film Critics Association Awards	1999	Living Out Loud	Best Actress	Nominated	
Chicago Film Critics Association Awards	2004	Thirteen	Best Supporting Actress	Nominated	
Chicago Film Critics Association Awards	2017	The Big Sick	Best Supporting Actress	Nominated	
Chlotrudis Awards	2018	Strange Weather	Best Actress	Won (Note: Tied with Sally Hawkins for The Shape of Water.)	
Costume Designers Guild Awards	2004	—	Distinguished Actor Award	Won	
Crime Thriller Awards	2013	Top of the Lake	Best Supporting Actress	Nominated	
Critics' Choice Awards	2004	Thirteen	Best Supporting Actress	Nominated	
Critics' Choice Awards	2018	The Big Sick	Best Supporting Actress	Nominated	
Critics' Choice Super Awards	2026	Star Trek: Starfleet Academy	Best Actress in a Science Fiction/Fantasy Series	Nominated	
Dallas–Fort Worth Film Critics Association Awards	1993	The Piano	Best Actress	Won	
Dallas–Fort Worth Film Critics Association Awards	2004	Thirteen	Best Supporting Actress	Nominated	
Dallas–Fort Worth Film Critics Association Awards	2017	The Big Sick	Best Supporting Actress	Nominated	
David di Donatello Awards	1994	The Piano	Best Foreign Actress	Nominated	
Detroit Film Critics Society Awards	2017	The Big Sick	Best Supporting Actress	Nominated	
Detroit Film Critics Society Awards	2017	The Big Sick	Best Ensemble (Note: Shared with the cast.)	Nominated	
Equity Ensemble Awards	2014	Top of the Lake	Outstanding Performance by an Ensemble in a Miniseries or Telemovie	Won	
EDA Awards	2019	Incredibles 2	Best Animated Female	Won	
Florida Film Critics Circle Awards	2017	The Big Sick	Best Supporting Actress	Nominated	
Florida Film Critics Circle Awards	2017	The Big Sick	Best Ensemble	Nominated	
Film Independent Spirit Awards	2018	The Big Sick	Best Supporting Female	Nominated	
Georgia Film Critics Association Awards	2018	The Big Sick	Best Supporting Actress	Nominated	
Golden Globes	1988	Broadcast News	Best Actress in a Motion Picture – Musical or Comedy	Nominated	
Golden Globes	1990	Roe vs. Wade	Best Actress in a Miniseries or Television Film	Nominated	
Golden Globes	1994	The Piano	Best Actress in a Motion Picture – Drama	Won	
Golden Globes	1994	The Positively True Adventures of the Alleged Texas Cheerleader-Murdering Mom	Best Actress in a Miniseries or Television Film	Nominated	
Golden Globes	2001	Harlan County War	Best Actress in a Miniseries or Television Film	Nominated	
Golden Globes	2004	Thirteen	Best Supporting Actress – Motion Picture	Nominated	
Golden Globes	2008	Saving Grace	Best Actress in a Television Series – Drama	Nominated	
Gotham Awards	2005	Nine Lives	Best Ensemble Performance	Nominated	
Gracie Awards	2008	Saving Grace	Outstanding Female Lead in a Drama Series	Won	
Hollywood Critics Association Movie Awards	2018	The Big Sick	Best Supporting Actress	Nominated	
Hollywood Critics Association TV Awards	2021	Mr. Mayor	Best Supporting Actress in a Broadcast Network or Cable Comedy Series	Nominated	
Hollywood Film Awards	2017	The Big Sick	Hollywood Comedy Ensemble Award	Won	
Houston Film Critics Society Awards	2018	The Big Sick	Best Supporting Actress	Nominated	
IndieWire Critics Poll Awards	2017	The Big Sick	Best Supporting Actress	Nominated	
International Cinephile Society Awards	2004	Thirteen	Best Supporting Actress	Won	
Las Vegas Film Critics Society Awards	2004	Thirteen	Best Supporting Actress	Won	
Locarno Film Festival Awards	2003	Thirteen	Best Actress	Won (Note: Tied with Diana Dumbrava for Maria and Kirron Kher for Silent Waters.)	
Locarno Film Festival Awards	2005	Nine Lives	Best Actress (Note: Shared with Kathy Baker, Amy Brenneman, Elpidia Carrillo, Glenn Close, LisaGay Hamilton, Amanda Seyfried, Sissy Spacek, and Robin Wright.)	Won	
London Film Critics' Circle Awards	1994	The Piano	Actress of the Year	Won	
London Film Critics' Circle Awards	2004	Thirteen	Actress of the Year	Nominated	
London Film Critics' Circle Awards	2018	The Big Sick	Supporting Actress of the Year	Nominated	
Los Angeles Film Critics Association Awards	1987	Broadcast News	Best Actress	Won (Note: Tied with Sally Kirkland for Anna.)	
Los Angeles Film Critics Association Awards	1993	The Piano	Best Actress	Won	
MTV Movie & TV Awards	2005	The Incredibles	Best On-Screen Team (Note: Shared with Spencer Fox, Craig T. Nelson, and Sarah Vowell)	Nominated	
National Board of Review Awards	1988	Broadcast News	Best Actress	Won (Note: Tied with Lillian Gish for The Whales of August.)	
National Board of Review Awards	1994	The Piano	Best Actress	Won	
National Society of Film Critics Awards	1988	Broadcast News, Raising Arizona	Best Actress	Nominated	
National Society of Film Critics Awards	1994	The Piano	Best Actress	Won	
New York Film Critics Circle Awards	1988	Broadcast News	Best Actress	Won	
New York Film Critics Circle Awards	1994	The Piano	Best Actress	Won	
New York Women in Film & Television Awards	1993	—	Muse Award	Won	
Online Film Critics Society Awards	2004	Thirteen	Best Supporting Actress	Nominated	
Online Film Critics Society Awards	2017	The Big Sick	Best Supporting Actress	Nominated	
Palm Springs International Film Festival Awards	2018	—	Career Achievement Award	Won	
People's Choice Awards	2009	Saving Grace	Favorite TV Drama Diva	Nominated	
Phoenix Film Festival Awards	2001	—	Tribute Award	Won	
Primetime Emmy Awards	1989	Roe vs. Wade	Outstanding Lead Actress in a Miniseries or a Special	Won	
Primetime Emmy Awards	1993	The Positively True Adventures of the Alleged Texas Cheerleader-Murdering Mom	Outstanding Lead Actress in a Miniseries or a Special	Won	
Primetime Emmy Awards	2000	Harlan County War	Outstanding Lead Actress in a Limited Series or Movie	Nominated	
Primetime Emmy Awards	2001	When Billie Beat Bobby	Outstanding Lead Actress in a Miniseries or a Movie	Nominated	
Primetime Emmy Awards	2001	Things You Can Tell Just by Looking at Her	Outstanding Supporting Actress in a Miniseries or a Movie	Nominated	
Primetime Emmy Awards	2008	Saving Grace	Outstanding Lead Actress in a Drama Series	Nominated	
Primetime Emmy Awards	2009	Saving Grace	Outstanding Lead Actress in a Drama Series	Nominated	
St. Louis Film Critics Association Awards	2017	The Big Sick	Best Supporting Actress	Nominated	
San Diego Film Critics Society Awards	2017	The Big Sick	Best Supporting Actress	Nominated	
San Francisco Bay Area Film Critics Circle Awards	2017	The Big Sick	Best Supporting Actress	Nominated	
Satellite Awards	1999	Living Out Loud	Best Actress in a Motion Picture – Comedy or Musical	Nominated	
Satellite Awards	2001	O Brother, Where Art Thou?	Best Supporting Actress in a Motion Picture – Comedy or Musical	Nominated	
Satellite Awards	2001	Harlan County War	Best Actress in a Miniseries or Television Film	Nominated	
Satellite Awards	2004	Thirteen	Best Supporting Actress in a Motion Picture – Drama	Nominated	
Satellite Awards	2008	Saving Grace	Best Actress in a Television Series – Drama	Nominated	
Satellite Awards	2018	The Big Sick	Best Supporting Actress in a Motion Picture	Nominated	
Saturn Awards	2008	Saving Grace	Best Actress on Television	Nominated	
Savannah Film Festival Awards	2017	—	Icon Award	Won	
SAG-AFTRA's Actor Awards	2004	Thirteen	Outstanding Performance by a Female Actor in a Supporting Role	Nominated	
SAG-AFTRA's Actor Awards	2008	Saving Grace	Outstanding Performance by a Female Actor in a Drama Series	Nominated	
SAG-AFTRA's Actor Awards	2009	Saving Grace	Outstanding Performance by a Female Actor in a Drama Series	Nominated	
SAG-AFTRA's Actor Awards	2010	Saving Grace	Outstanding Performance by a Female Actor in a Drama Series	Nominated	
SAG-AFTRA's Actor Awards	2014	Top of the Lake	Outstanding Performance by a Female Actor in a Miniseries or Television Movie	Nominated	
SAG-AFTRA's Actor Awards	2018	The Big Sick	Outstanding Performance by a Female Actor in a Supporting Role	Nominated	
SAG-AFTRA's Actor Awards	2018	The Big Sick	Outstanding Performance by a Cast in a Motion Picture	Nominated	
Seattle Film Critics Society Awards	2017	The Big Sick	Best Actress in a Supporting Role	Nominated	
Southeastern Film Critics Association Awards	1994	The Piano	Best Actress	Won	
Southeastern Film Critics Association Awards	2003	Thirteen	Best Supporting Actress	Runner-up	
Sundance Film Festival Awards	2003	—	Tribute to Independent Vision Award	Won	
Village Voice Film Poll Awards	2003	Thirteen	Best Supporting Performance	Nominated	
Washington D.C. Area Film Critics Association Awards	2003	Thirteen	Best Supporting Actress	Nominated	
Washington D.C. Area Film Critics Association Awards	2017	The Big Sick	Best Supporting Actress	Nominated	
Washington D.C. Area Film Critics Association Awards	2018	Incredibles 2	Best Voice Performance	Nominated	
Women in Film Honors	2009	Saving Grace	Lucy Award for Excellence in Television	Won	
