= 60th Academy Awards =

- Official poster
- Date: April 11, 1988
- Site: Shrine Auditorium; Los Angeles, California
- Hosted by: Chevy Chase
- Produced by: Samuel Goldwyn Jr.
- Directed by: Marty Pasetta

Highlights
- Best Picture: The Last Emperor
- Most awards: The Last Emperor (9)
- Most nominations: The Last Emperor (9)

TV in the United States
- Network: ABC
- Duration: 3 hours, 33 minutes
- Ratings: 42.2 million 29.4% (Nielsen ratings)

The 60th Academy Awards ceremony, presented by the Academy of Motion Picture Arts and Sciences (AMPAS), took place on April 11, 1988, at the Shrine Auditorium in Los Angeles beginning at 6:00 p.m. PDT. During the ceremony, AMPAS presented Academy Awards (commonly referred to as Oscars) in 22 categories honoring films released in 1987. The ceremony, televised in the United States by ABC, was produced by Samuel Goldwyn Jr. and directed by Marty Pasetta. Actor Chevy Chase hosted the show for the second consecutive year. Two weeks earlier, in a ceremony held at the Beverly Hilton in Beverly Hills, California, on March 27, the Academy Awards for Technical Achievement were presented by host Shirley Jones.

The Last Emperor won all nine awards it was nominated for, including Best Picture and Best Director for Bernardo Bertolucci. For their performances in Moonstruck, Cher and Olympia Dukakis won Best Actress and Best Supporting Actress, respectively. Michael Douglas won Best Actor for his role in Wall Street; and Sean Connery won Best Supporting Actor for The Untouchables, the latter becoming the first and only Scottish thespian to win an acting Oscar. The telecast garnered 42.2 million viewers in the United States.

== Winners and nominees ==
The nominees for the 60th Academy Awards were announced on February 16, 1988, at 5:38 PM PST (13:38 UTC) at the Samuel Goldwyn Theater in Beverly Hills, California, by Robert Wise, president of the academy, and actress Shirley MacLaine. The Last Emperor received the most nominations, with nine total; Broadcast News came in second with seven.

The winners were announced at the awards ceremony on April 11, 1988. The Last Emperor became the second film after 1958's Gigi to earn nine Oscar nominations and win all of them. For the first time in Oscar history, all five Best Director nominees were born outside the United States. Best Actor winner Michael Douglas became the first person to win Oscars for both acting and producing, albeit the first person to win the awards for two separate films and in different years. He previously won a Best Picture award as co-producer of One Flew Over the Cuckoo's Nest (1975).

=== Awards ===
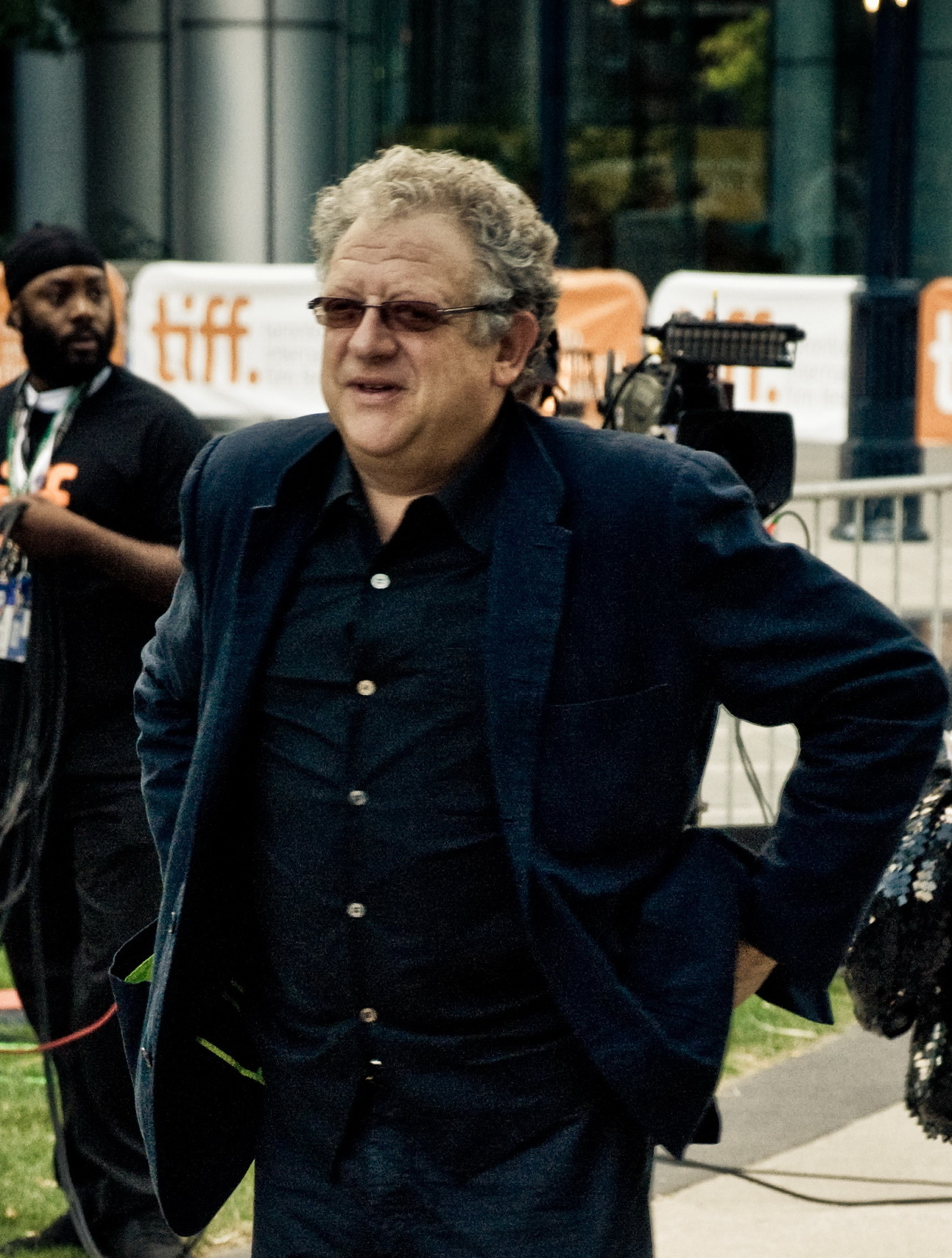
Jeremy Thomas, Best Picture winner

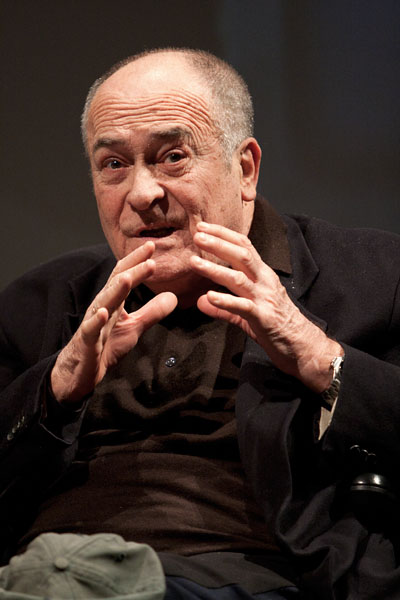
Bernardo Bertolucci, Best Director winner and Best Adapted Screenplay co-winner

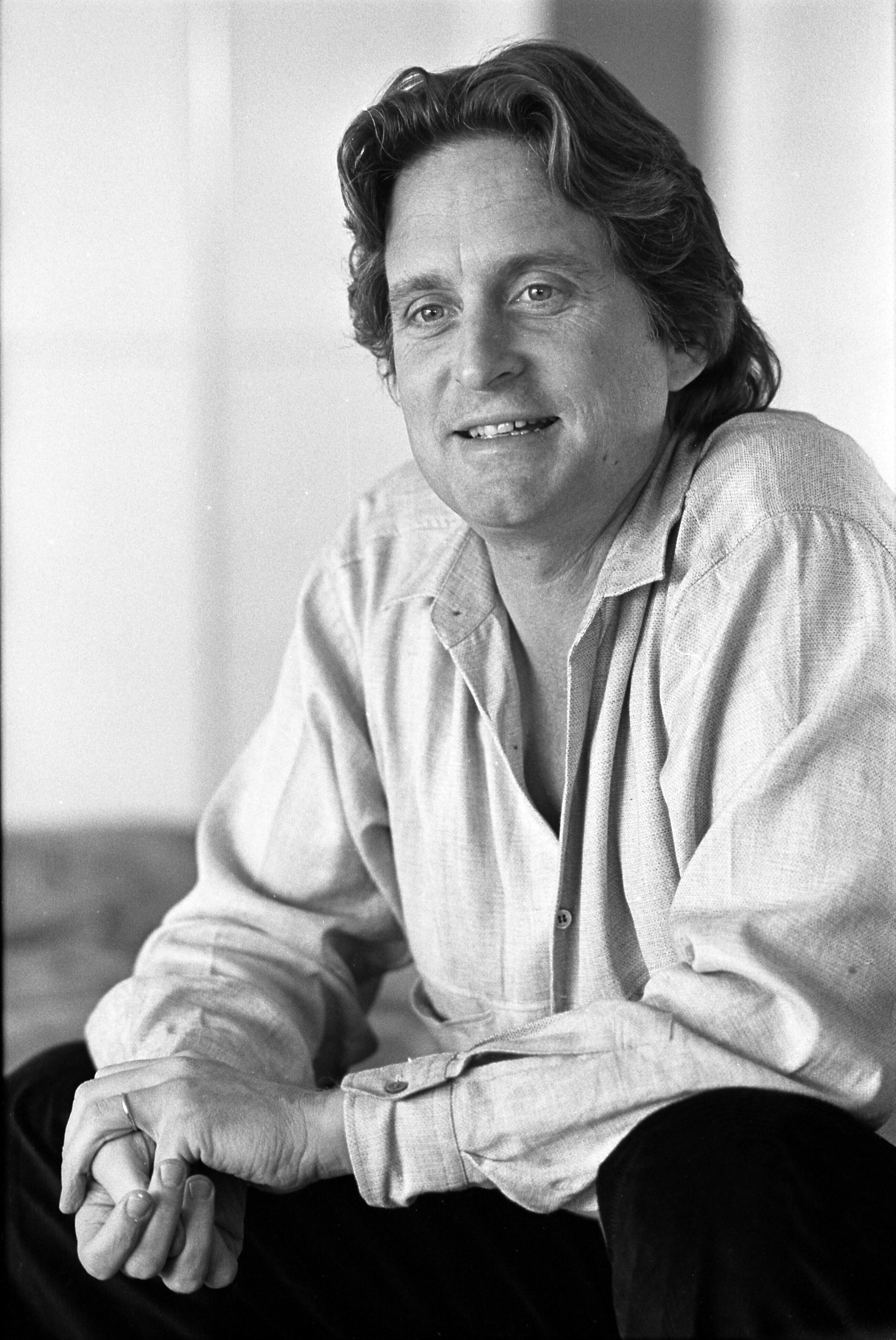
Michael Douglas, Best Actor winner

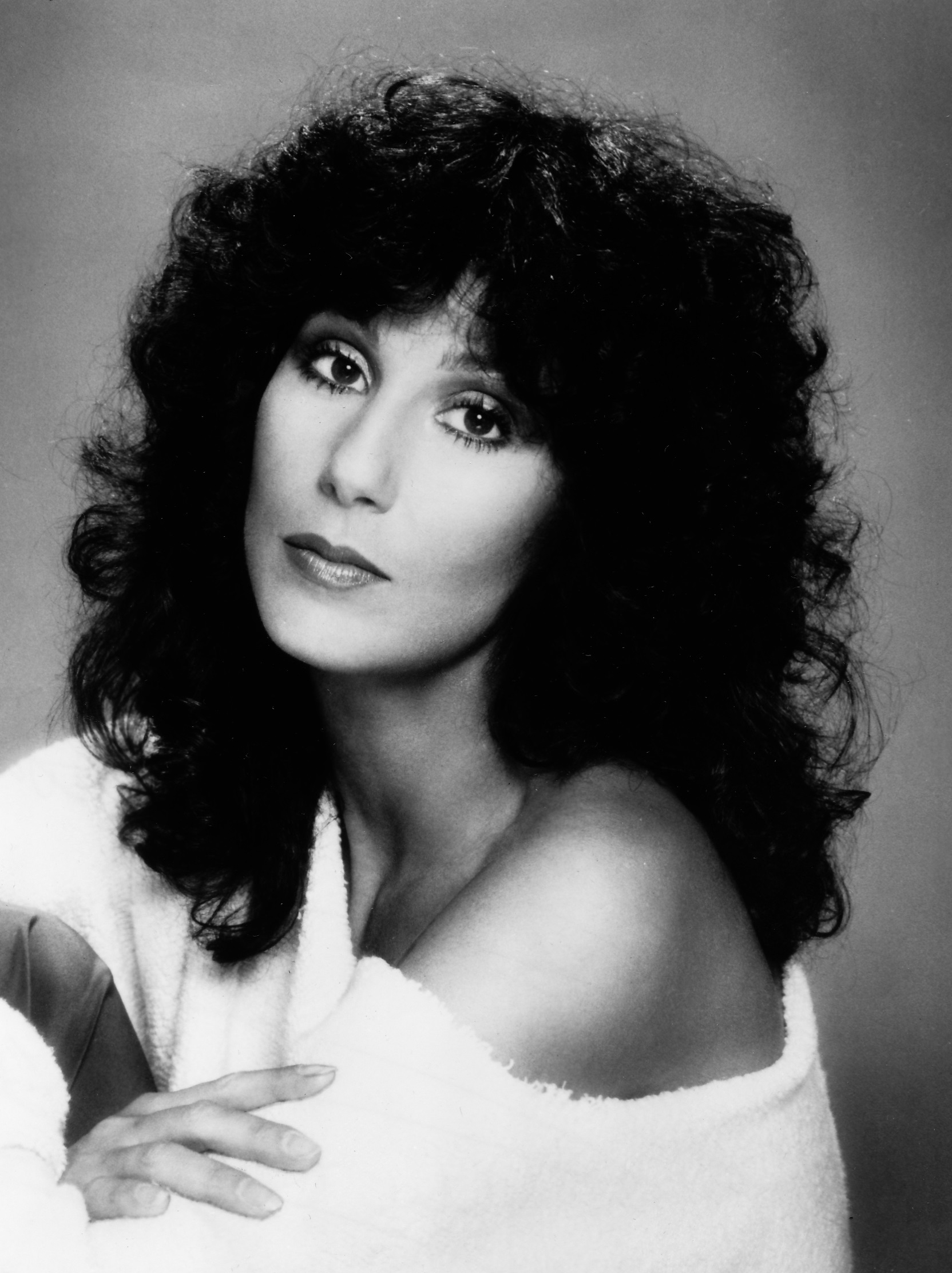
Cher, Best Actress winner

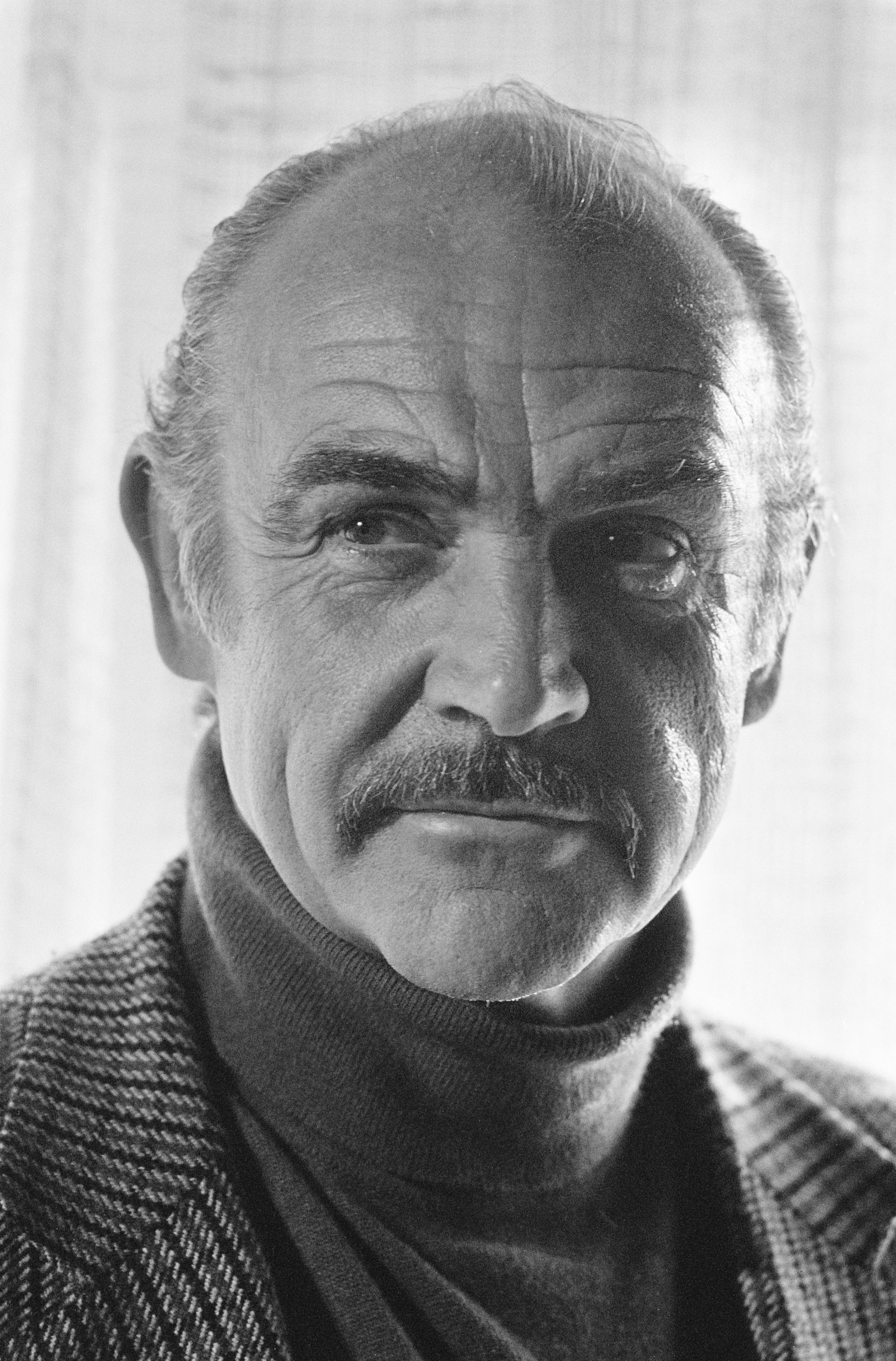
Sean Connery, Best Supporting Actor winner

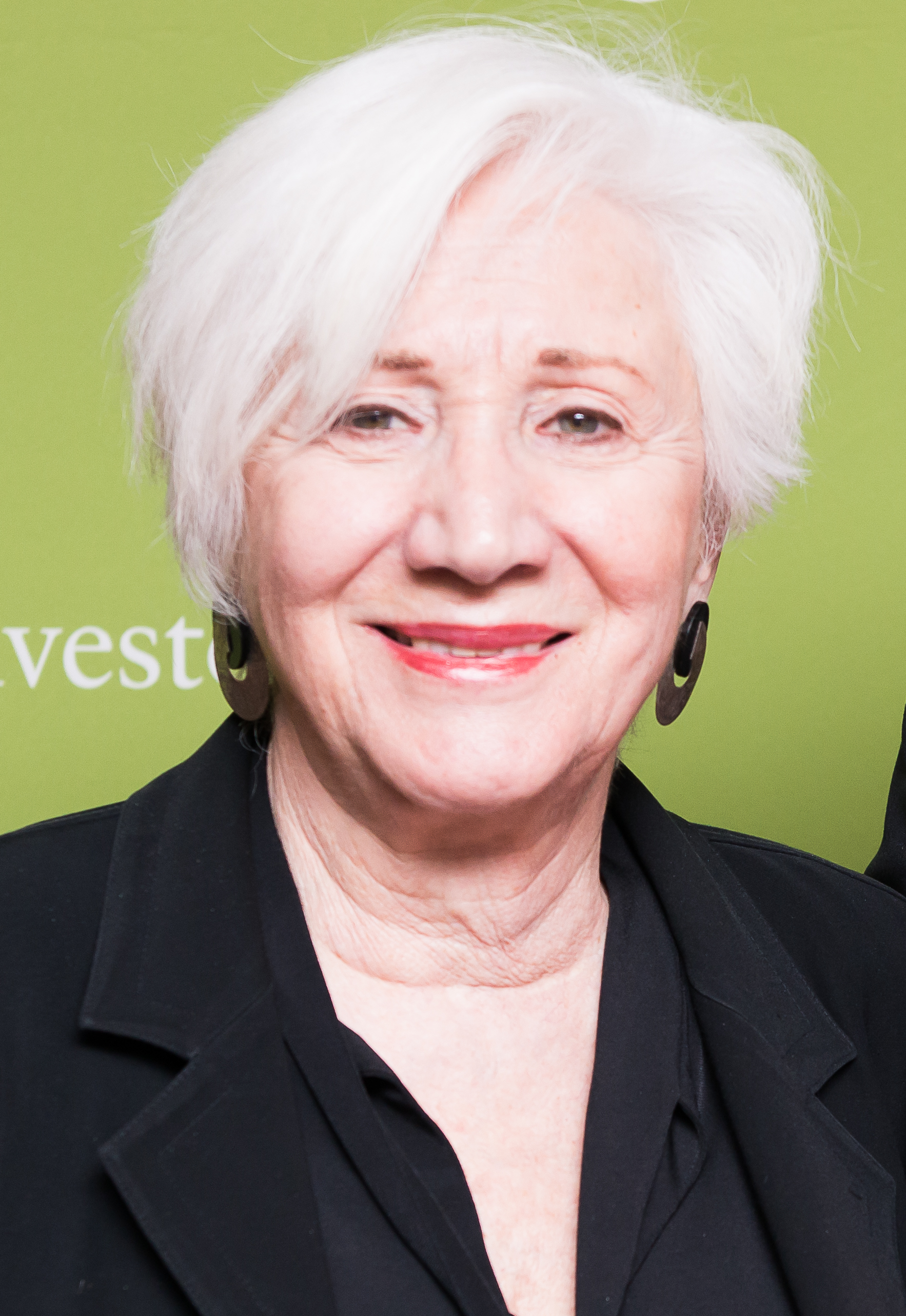
Olympia Dukakis, Best Supporting Actress winner

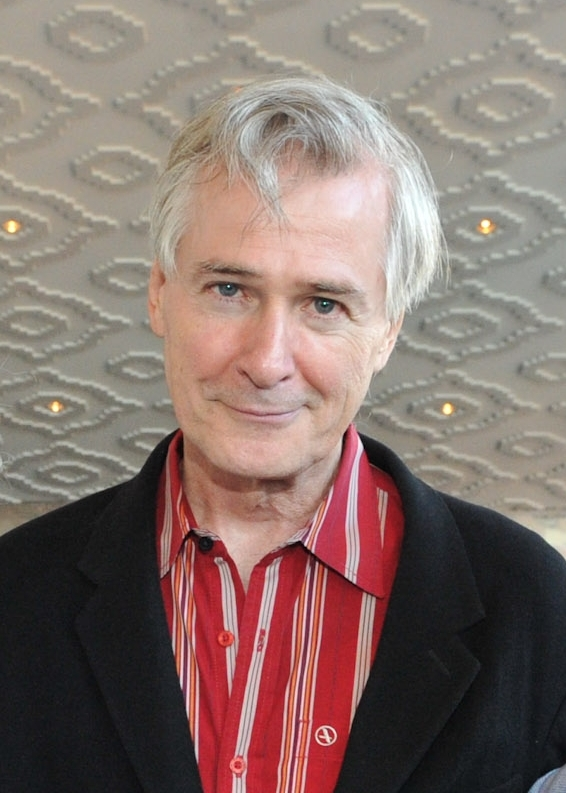
John Patrick Shanley, Best Original Screenplay winner

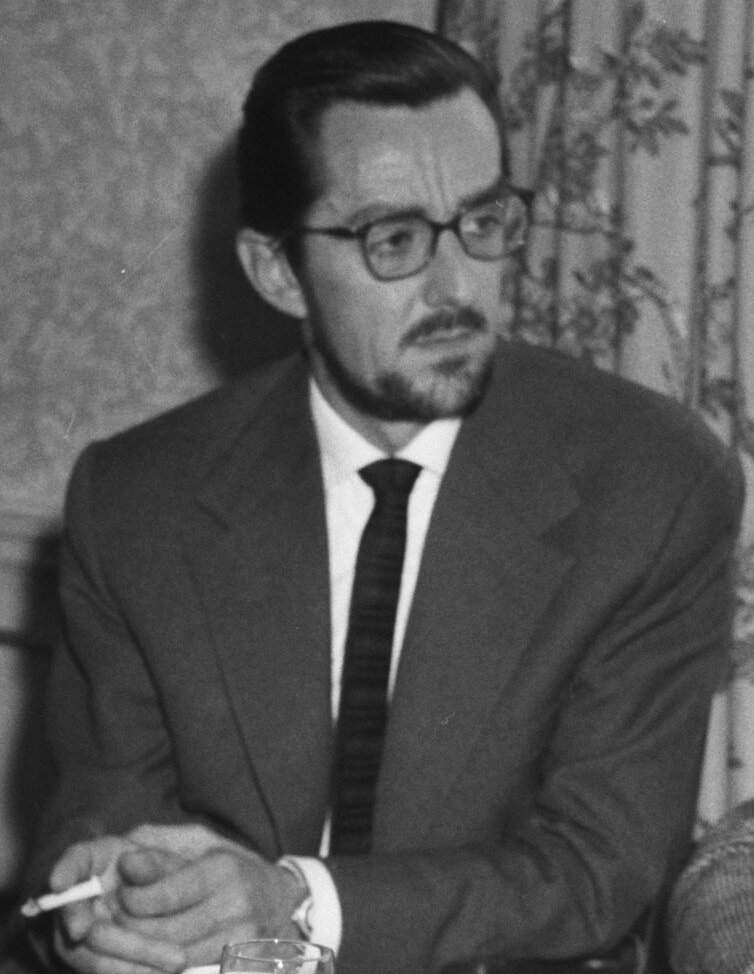
Gabriel Axel, Best Foreign Language Film winner

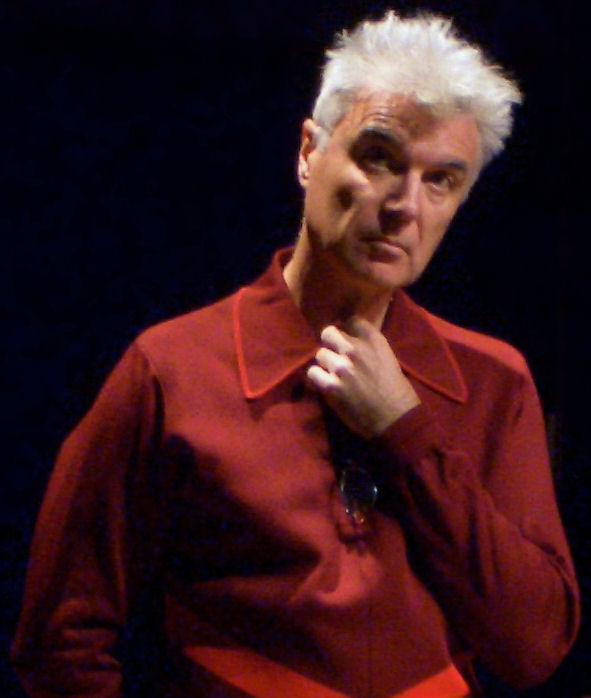
David Byrne, Best Original Score co-winner

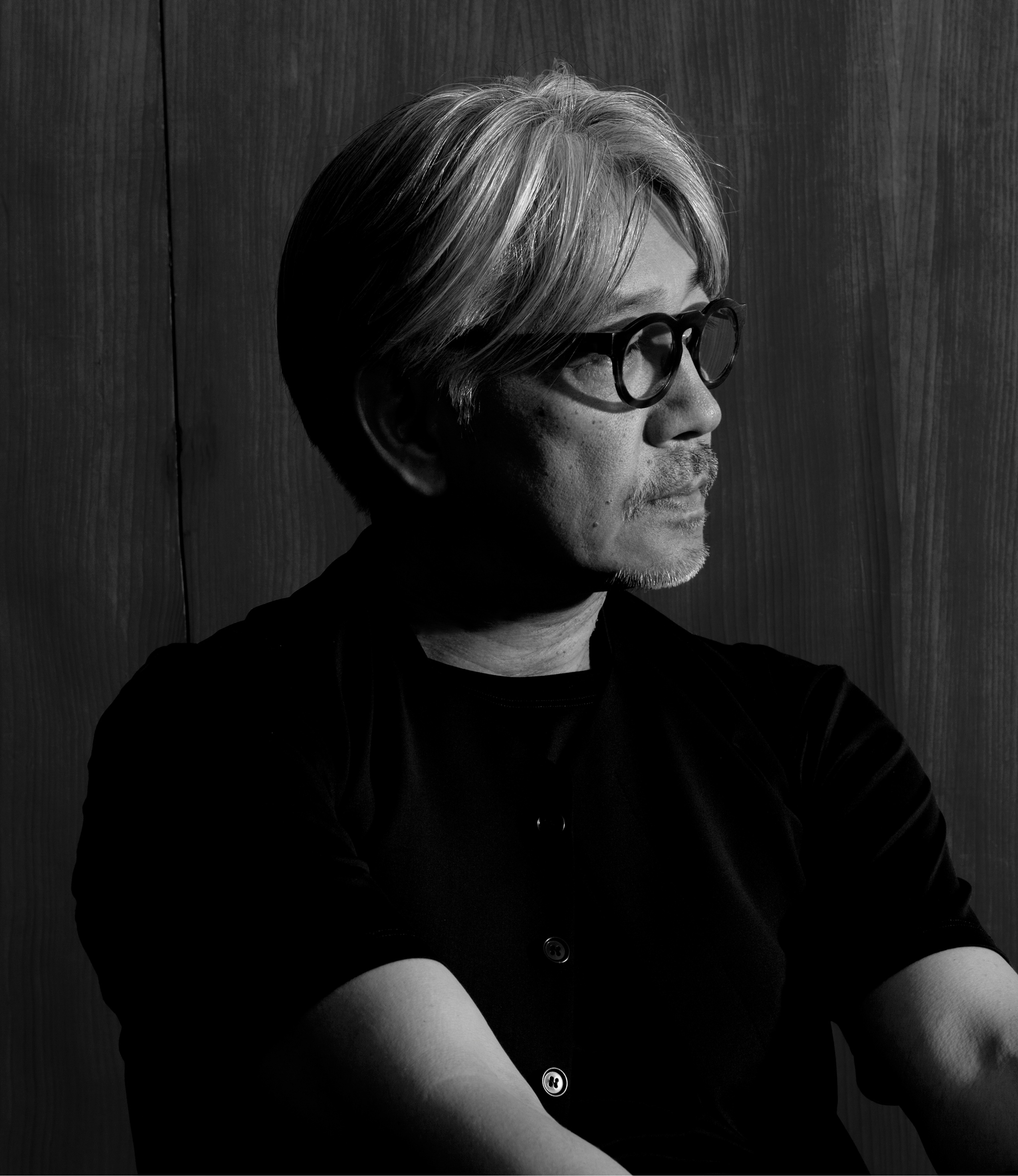
Ryuichi Sakamoto, Best Original Score co-winner

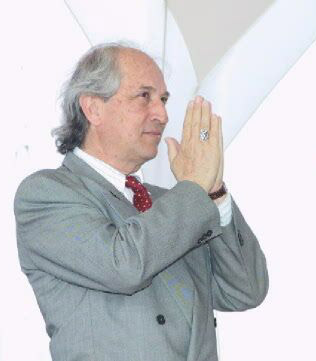
Vittorio Storaro, Best Cinematography winner

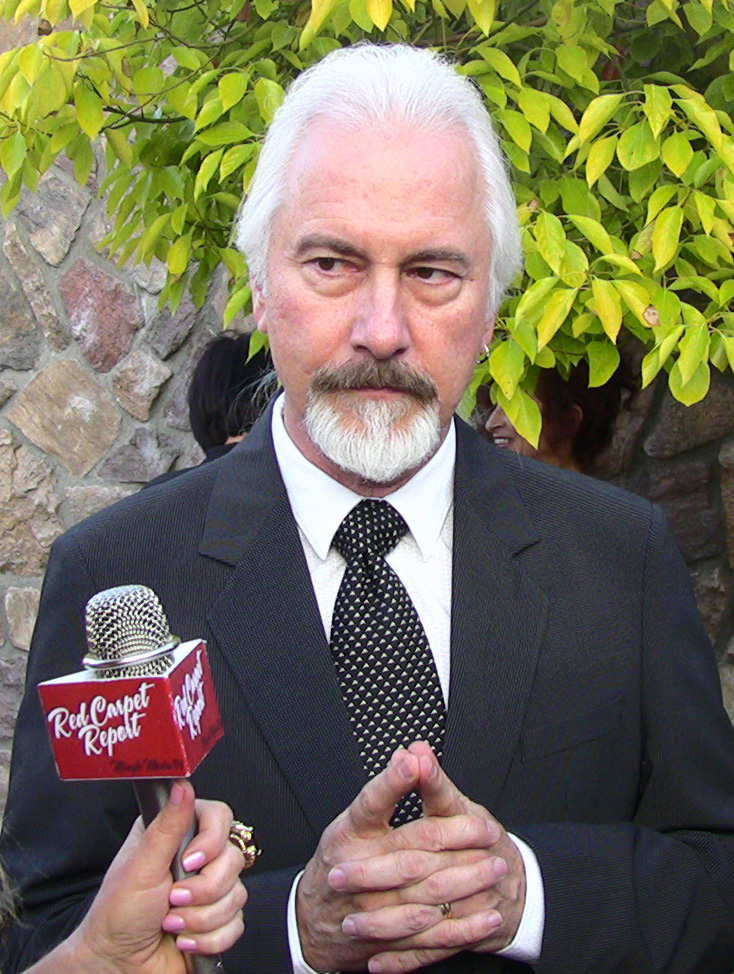
Rick Baker, Best Makeup winner

Winners are listed first, highlighted in boldface, and indicated with a double dagger (‡).

| **Best Picture**: **The Last Emperor – Jeremy Thomas, producer**‡; Broadcast News – James L. Brooks, producer; Fatal Attraction – Stanley R. Jaffe and Sherry Lansing, producers; Hope and Glory – John Boorman, producer; Moonstruck – Norman Jewison and Patrick Palmer, producers | **Best Directing**: **Bernardo Bertolucci – The Last Emperor**‡; Adrian Lyne – Fatal Attraction; John Boorman – Hope and Glory; Norman Jewison – Moonstruck; Lasse Hallström – My Life as a Dog |
| **Best Actor in a Leading Role**: **Michael Douglas – Wall Street as Gordon Gekko**‡; William Hurt – Broadcast News as Tom Grunick; Marcello Mastroianni – Dark Eyes as Romano; Jack Nicholson – Ironweed as Francis Phelan; Robin Williams – Good Morning, Vietnam as Adrian Cronauer | **Best Actress in a Leading Role**: **Cher – Moonstruck as Loretta Castorini**‡; Glenn Close – Fatal Attraction as Alex Forrest; Holly Hunter – Broadcast News as Jane Craig; Sally Kirkland – Anna as Anna; Meryl Streep – Ironweed as Helen Archer |
| **Best Actor in a Supporting Role**: **Sean Connery – The Untouchables as Jim Malone**‡; Albert Brooks – Broadcast News as Aaron Altman; Morgan Freeman – Street Smart as Leo "Fast Black" Smalls Jr.; Vincent Gardenia – Moonstruck as Cosmo Castorini; Denzel Washington – Cry Freedom as Steve Biko | **Best Actress in a Supporting Role**: **Olympia Dukakis – Moonstruck as Rose Castorini**‡; Norma Aleandro – Gaby: A True Story as Florencia Sánchez Morales; Anne Archer – Fatal Attraction as Beth Gallagher; Anne Ramsey – Throw Momma from the Train as Mrs. Lift; Ann Sothern – The Whales of August as Tisha Doughty |
| **Best Writing (Screenplay Written Directly for the Screen)**: **Moonstruck – John Patrick Shanley**‡; Au revoir les enfants – Louis Malle; Broadcast News – James L. Brooks; Hope and Glory – John Boorman; Radio Days – Woody Allen | **Best Writing (Screenplay Based on Material from Another Medium)**: **The Last Emperor – Mark Peploe and Bernardo Bertolucci based on the autobiography From Emperor to Citizen: The Autobiography of Aisin-Gioro Pu Yi by Henry Pu Yi**‡; The Dead – Tony Huston based on the short story by James Joyce; Fatal Attraction – James Dearden based on his teleplay Diversion; Full Metal Jacket – Stanley Kubrick, Michael Herr, and Gustav Hasford based on the novel The Short-Timers by Gustav Hasford; My Life as a Dog – Lasse Hallström, Reidar Jönsson, Brasse Brännström, and Pelle Berglund based on the novel Mitt liv som hund by Reidar Jönsson |
| **Best Foreign Language Film**: **Babette's Feast (Denmark) in Danish and French – Gabriel Axel**‡; Au revoir les enfants (France) in French – Louis Malle; Course Completed (Spain) in Spanish – José Luis Garci; The Family (Italy) in Italian – Ettore Scola; Pathfinder (Norway) in Sami – Nils Gaup | **Best Documentary (Feature)**: **The Ten-Year Lunch: The Wit and Legend of the Algonquin Round Table – Aviva Slesin**‡; Eyes on the Prize: America's Civil Rights Years/Bridge to Freedom 1965 – Callie Crossley and James A. DeVinney; Hellfire: A Journey from Hiroshima – John Junkerman and John W. Dower; Radio Bikini – Robert Stone; A Stitch for Time – Barbara Herbich and Cyril Christo |
| **Best Documentary (Short Subject)**: **Young at Heart – Sue Marx and Pamela Conn**‡; Frances Steloff: Memoirs of a Bookseller – Deborah Dickson; In the Wee Wee Hours... – Frank Daniel and Izak Ben-Meir; Language Says It All – Megan Williams; Silver into Gold – Lynn Mueller | **Best Short Film (Live Action)**: **Ray's Male Heterosexual Dance Hall – Jonathan Sanger and Jana Sue Memel**‡; Making Waves – Ann Wingate; Shoeshine – Robert A. Katz |
| **Best Short Film (Animated)**: **The Man Who Planted Trees – Frédéric Back**‡; George and Rosemary – Eunice Macaulay; Your Face – Bill Plympton | **Best Music (Original Score)**: **The Last Emperor – Ryuichi Sakamoto, David Byrne and Cong Su**‡; Cry Freedom – George Fenton and Jonas Gwangwa; Empire of the Sun – John Williams; The Untouchables – Ennio Morricone; The Witches of Eastwick – John Williams |
| **Best Music (Original Song)**: **"(I've Had) The Time of My Life" from Dirty Dancing – Music by Franke Previte, John DeNicola, and Donald Markowitz; Lyrics by Franke Previte**‡; "Cry Freedom" from Cry Freedom – Music and Lyrics by George Fenton and Jonas Gwangwa; "Nothing's Gonna Stop Us Now" from Mannequin – Music and Lyrics by Albert Hammond and Diane Warren; "Shakedown" from Beverly Hills Cop II – Music by Harold Faltermeyer and Keith Forsey; Lyrics by Harold Faltermeyer, Keith Forsey, and Bob Seger; "Storybook Love" from The Princess Bride – Music and Lyrics by Willy DeVille | **Best Sound**: **The Last Emperor – Bill Rowe and Ivan Sharrock**‡; Empire of the Sun – Robert Knudson, Don Digirolamo, John Boyd, and Tony Dawe; Lethal Weapon – Les Fresholtz, Dick Alexander, Vern Poore, and Bill Nelson; RoboCop – Michael J. Kohut, Carlos Delarios, Aaron Rochin, and Robert Wald; The Witches of Eastwick – Wayne Artman, Tom Beckert, Tom E. Dahl, and Art Rochester |
| **Best Art Direction**: **The Last Emperor – Art Direction: Ferdinando Scarfiotti; Set Decoration: Bruno Cesari and Osvaldo Desideri**‡; Empire of the Sun – Art Direction: Norman Reynolds; Set Decoration: Harry Cordwell; Hope and Glory – Art Direction: Anthony D. G. Pratt; Set Decoration: Joanne Woollard; Radio Days – Art Direction: Santo Loquasto; Set Decoration: Carol Joffe, Leslie Bloom, and George DeTitta Jr.; The Untouchables – Art Direction: Patrizia von Brandenstein and William A. Elliott; Set Decoration: Hal Gausman | **Best Cinematography**: **The Last Emperor – Vittorio Storaro**‡; Broadcast News – Michael Ballhaus; Empire of the Sun – Allen Daviau; Hope and Glory – Philippe Rousselot; Matewan – Haskell Wexler |
| **Best Makeup**: **Harry and the Hendersons – Rick Baker**‡; Happy New Year – Bob Laden | **Best Costume Design**: **The Last Emperor – James Acheson**‡; The Dead – Dorothy Jeakins; Empire of the Sun – Bob Ringwood; Maurice – Jenny Beavan and John Bright; The Untouchables – Marilyn Vance-Straker |
| **Best Film Editing**: **The Last Emperor – Gabriella Cristiani**‡; Broadcast News – Richard Marks; Empire of the Sun – Michael Kahn; Fatal Attraction – Michael Kahn and Peter E. Berger; RoboCop – Frank J. Urioste | **Best Visual Effects**: **Innerspace – Dennis Muren, Bill George, Harley Jessup, and Kenneth F. Smith**‡; Predator – Joel Hynek, Robert M. Greenberg, Richard Greenberg, and Stan Winston |

=== Special Achievement Award (Sound Effects Editing) ===
- RoboCop – Stephen Flick and John Pospisil.

=== Irving G. Thalberg Memorial Award ===
The award honors "creative producers whose bodies of work reflect a consistently high quality of motion picture production".

- Billy Wilder

=== Multiple nominations and awards ===
The following 15 films received multiple nominations:

| Nominations | Film |
|---|---|
| 9 | The Last Emperor |
| 7 | Broadcast News |
| 6 | Empire of the Sun |
| 6 | Fatal Attraction |
| 6 | Moonstruck |
| 5 | Hope and Glory |
| 4 | The Untouchables |
| 3 | Cry Freedom |
| 2 | Au revoir les enfants |
| 2 | The Dead |
| 2 | Ironweed |
| 2 | My Life as a Dog |
| 2 | Radio Days |
| 2 | RoboCop (Note: Not counting the non-competitive Special Achievement Award for RoboCop.) |
| 2 | The Witches of Eastwick |

The following two films received multiple awards:

| Awards | Film |
|---|---|
| 9 | The Last Emperor |
| 3 | Moonstruck |

== Presenters and performers ==
The following individuals, listed in order of appearance, presented awards or performed musical numbers.

=== Presenters ===
| Name(s) | Role |
|---|---|
| Hank Simms | Announcer for the 60th annual Academy Awards |
| Robert Wise (AMPAS President) | Gave opening remarks welcoming guests to the awards ceremony |
| Sean Connery | Presenter of the award for Best Visual Effects |
| Glenn Close; Michael Douglas | Presenters of the award for Best Supporting Actress |
| Olivia de Havilland | Presenter of the award for Best Art Direction |
| Mel Gibson; Danny Glover | Presenters of the award for Best Cinematography |
| Mickey Mouse; Tom Selleck | Presentations of the award for Best Animated Short Film |
| Joan Chen; John Lone | Presenters of the award for Best Documentary Short Subject |
| Charlton Heston | Presenter of the Academy Awards history montage |
| Steve Guttenberg | Presenter of the award for Best Documentary Feature |
| Billy Crystal | Presenter of the award for Best Sound |
| Nicolas Cage; Cher | Presenters of the award for Best Supporting Actor |
| Rob Lowe; Sean Young | Presenters of the award for Best Film Editing |
| Jack Lemmon | Presenter of the Irving G. Thalberg Memorial Award to Billy Wilder |
| Liza Minnelli; Dudley Moore | Presenters of the award for Best Original Song |
| Jennifer Grey; Patrick Swayze | Presenters of the award for Best Original Score |
| Marlee Matlin | Presenter of the award for Best Actor |
| Shirley Jones (pre-recorded footage) | Presenter of the segment of the Academy Awards for Technical Achievement and the Gordon E. Sawyer Award |
| Peter Weller as RoboCop | Presenter of the award for Best Sound Effects Editing |
| Paul Reubens as Pee-wee Herman | Presenter of the award for Best Live Action Short Film |
| Kevin Costner; Daryl Hannah | Presenters of the award for Best Costume Design |
| Robin Williams | Presentations of the award for Best Director |
| John Candy | Presenter of the award for Best Makeup |
| Audrey Hepburn; Gregory Peck | Presenters of the awards for Best Adapted Screenplay and Best Original Screenplay |
| Faye Dunaway; James Garner | Presenters of the award for Best Foreign Language Film |
| Paul Newman | Presenter of the award for Best Actress |
| Eddie Murphy | Presenter of the award for Best Picture |

=== Performers ===
| Name(s) | Role | Performed |
|---|---|---|
| Bill Conti | Musical arranger | Orchestral |
| Academy Awards Chorus | Performers | "I Hope I Get It" from A Chorus Line |
| Willy DeVille | Performer | "Storybook Love" from The Princess Bride |
| Starship; Gloria Estefan | Performers | "Nothing's Gonna Stop Us Now" from Mannequin |
| George Fenton; Jonas Gwangwa | Performers | "Cry Freedom" from Cry Freedom |
| Little Richard | Performer | "Shakedown" from Beverly Hills Cop II |
| Bill Medley; Jennifer Warnes | Performers | "(I've Had) The Time of My Life" from Dirty Dancing |

== Ceremony information ==
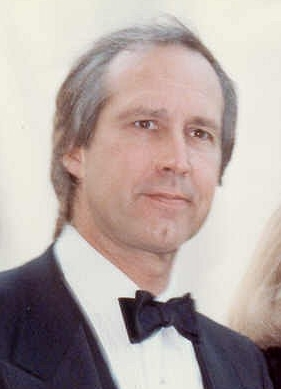
Chevy Chase hosted the 60th Academy Awards.

In view of the 60th anniversary of the Academy Awards, the academy hired film producer Samuel Goldwyn Jr. in October 1987 to oversee the telecast for the second straight year. Three months later, Goldwyn selected actor and comedian Chevy Chase to emcee the 1988 ceremony. In addition, after being held at the Dorothy Chandler Pavilion for almost two decades, AMPAS decided to move the telecast to the Shrine Auditorium in order to accommodate more rehearsal time and take advantage of the large venue's seating capacity. This marked the first time the facility served as the site for the Oscars since the 20th ceremony held in 1948. Additionally, Goldwyn and Passetta originally planned to feature pre-recorded red carpet arrival footage of actors who had roles in the 59 previous Best Picture winners. However, the segment was dropped altogether due to traffic problems among guests arriving at the ceremony.

Furthermore, the 1988 Writers Guild of America strike, which began more than a month before the ceremony, affected the telecast and its surrounding events. Despite the Writers Guild of America refusing to grant a waiver permitting writers to work on the scripted dialogue for the gala, the three head writers for the telecast, Ernest Lehman, Melville Shavelson, and Jack Rose, assured the AMPAS and ABC that more than half of the material had already been completed. To compensate for the missing portions of the script, Goldwyn heavily utilized comedians such as John Candy, Billy Crystal, Eddie Murphy, and Robin Williams to ad lib and improvise jokes. During the show, many of the participants expressed support for the writers, such as Best Supporting Actor winner Sean Connery who remarked in his acceptance speech, "If such a thing as a wish accompanied this award mine would be that we ended the writers' strike."

=== Box office performance of nominated films ===
At the time of the nominations announcement on February 16, the combined gross of the five Best Picture nominees at the US box office was $221 million with an average of $48.9 million. Fatal Attraction was the highest earner among the Best Picture nominees, with $142 million in domestic box office receipts. The film was followed by Broadcast News ($36.7 million), Moonstruck ($25.4 million), The Last Emperor ($11.9 million), and Hope and Glory ($5.2 million).

Of the 50 highest-grossing movies of the year, 39 nominations went to 17 films on the list. Only Fatal Attraction (2nd), The Untouchables (4th), Good Morning Vietnam (10th), Throw Momma from the Train (14th), Full Metal Jacket (21st), Broadcast News (26th), Wall Street (30th), and Moonstruck (39th) were nominated for Best Picture, acting, directing, or screenwriting. The other top 50 box office hits that earned nominations were Beverly Hills Cop II (1st), Lethal Weapon (7th), The Witches of Eastwick (8th), Dirty Dancing (9th), Predator (11th), RoboCop (15th), Mannequin (23rd), The Princess Bride (38th), and Innerspace (45th).

=== Critical reviews ===
The telecast received a negative reception from media outlets. Los Angeles Times television critic Howard Rosenberg commented, "Monday night's Academy Awards telecast on ABC was the Michael Dukakis and George Bush of TV awards programs: parched, drab and leaden. You kept hoping they'd draft Mario Cuomo." Tom Shales from The Washington Post wrote, "Of hope there was little and of glory almost none last night at the 60th annual Academy Awards, telecast live from the Shrine Auditorium in Los Angeles on ABC. Even considering the low standards set in previous years, the program seemed unusually lackluster from the word go." Columnist Matt Roush of USA Today quipped, "Chevy Chase stopped the show. Cold. Over and over. As the ever-unctuous host, he tried to get laughs by picking his nose and sneezing into his hand when his ad-libs failed, which was often." He also observed that The Last Emperor dominance over the awards created a dull and anticlimactic atmosphere to the proceedings.

=== Ratings and reception ===
The American telecast on ABC drew in an average of 42.2 million people over its length, which was a 13% increase from the previous year's ceremony. An estimated 70 million total viewers watched all or part of the awards. The show also drew higher Nielsen ratings compared to the previous ceremony, with 29.2% of households over a 49 percent share.

In July 1988, the ceremony presentation received four nominations at the 40th Primetime Emmys. The following month, the ceremony won one of those nominations for Outstanding Variety Music Events Programming (Samuel Goldwyn, Jr.).

== See also ==
- 8th Golden Raspberry Awards
- 30th Annual Grammy Awards
- 41st British Academy Film Awards
- 42nd Tony Awards
- 45th Golden Globe Awards
- List of submissions to the 60th Academy Awards for Best Foreign Language Film

== Bibliography ==
- Osborne, Robert (2008). 80 Years of the Oscar: The Complete History of the Academy Awards. New York: Abbeville Publishing Group. ISBN 978-0-7892-0992-4.
- Wiley, Mason; Bona, Damien (1996), Inside Oscar: The Unofficial History of the Academy Awards (5 ed.), New York: Ballantine Books, ISBN 0-345-40053-4, OCLC 779680732
