= Hope and Glory (film) =

1987 British film by John Boorman

- Theatrical release poster
- Directed by: John Boorman
- Written by: John Boorman
- Produced by: John Boorman; Michael Dryhurst
- Starring: Sarah Miles; David Hayman; Derrick O'Connor; Susan Wooldridge; Sammi Davis; Ian Bannen; Sebastian Rice-Edwards
- Cinematography: Philippe Rousselot
- Edited by: Ian Crafford
- Music by: Peter Martin
- Production companies: Goldcrest Films; Nelson Entertainment
- Distributed by: Columbia-Cannon-Warner Distributors (United Kingdom); Columbia Pictures (United States)
- Release dates: 16 October 1987 (New York City); 13 November 1987 (United Kingdom); 19 February 1988 (United States)
- Running time: 113 minutes
- Countries: United Kingdom; United States
- Language: English
- Budget: $9.3 million or £5.56 million
- Box office: $10 million

Hope and Glory is a 1987 comedy-drama war film written, produced, and directed by John Boorman based on his own experiences growing up in London during World War II. It was distributed by Columbia Pictures. The title is derived from the patriotic British song "Land of Hope and Glory". The film tells the story of the Rohan family and their experiences, as seen through the eyes of the son, Billy (Sebastian Rice-Edwards).

A critical and commercial success, the film won the Golden Globe Award for Best Motion Picture – Musical or Comedy and received five Academy Award nominations, including Best Picture, Best Director, and Best Original Screenplay (all for Boorman). It also received 13 BAFTA Award nominations, winning for Best Actress in a Supporting Role (Susan Wooldridge).

== Plot ==
The film begins on 3 September 1939, the day Britain declared war on Germany. It tells the story of the Rohan family (Billy, his sisters Sue and Dawn, and his parents Grace and Clive), who live in a suburb of London. Clive joins the army, leaving Grace alone to watch over the children. She almost sends Billy and Susie away from London, but pulls them back on the train platform when she realizes she cannot bear to be apart from them. Thus, Billy stays in London for the first years of the war.

Seen through the eyes of 10-year-old Billy, the "fireworks" provided by the Blitz (September 1940 – May 1941) every night are as exciting as they are terrifying, and the ruins they leave are a fascinating playground for Billy and other boys his age, who are largely unsupervised. The nightly raids do not provide the only drama, as Billy's older sister, Dawn, falls for Canadian soldier Bruce, becomes pregnant, and, finding her life turned upside down, discovers the value of her family.

When the Rohans' house burns down (due to an ordinary fire), the family moves to the bucolic Thames-side home of Grace's parents. This provides an opportunity for Billy to spend more time with his curmudgeonly Grandfather George, who teaches him "the ways of the river".

In the autumn of 1942, Winston Churchill delivers his famous "end of the beginning" speech. Bruce returns from his secret posting and goes AWOL to find Dawn. Immediately after they are married in the village church, MPs take Bruce away. That afternoon in the living room of her grandparents' house, Dawn gives birth to a son.

Although Grace has rented a house for the family just down the river, Billy must go back to London until he can get into the local school. George drives the boy to his old school, only to find the block filled with ecstatic children, as a stray bomb has destroyed the building. George drives Billy home. The adult Billy recalls: "In all my life, nothing ever quite matched the perfect joy of that moment. My school lay in ruins, and the river beckoned with the promise of stolen days." The credits roll over imagery of the river, to the music of "Land of Hope and Glory".

== Cast ==
- Sarah Miles as Grace
- David Hayman as Clive
- Derrick O'Connor as Mac
- Susan Wooldridge as Molly
- Ian Bannen as Grandfather George
- Sammi Davis as Dawn
- Jean-Marc Barr as Bruce
- Sebastian Rice-Edwards as Bill
- Geraldine Muir as Sue
- Annie Leon as Grandma
- Gerald James as Headmaster
- Nicky Taylor as Roger
- Sara Langton as Pauline

John Boorman provides the voice of the film's narrator. Boorman's daughter, Katrine Boorman, appears as Charity (one of Grace's sisters), while his son, Charley Boorman, appears as a downed Luftwaffe pilot.

== Production ==
=== Filming locations ===
According to TCM host Dave Karger's afterword to an April 2021 broadcast of the film, Boorman re-created the street on which he lived. The million-dollar 40-acre set was the largest constructed in England since World War II. The main film set was built on an unused runway at the former Wisley Airfield in Surrey, and the scenes by the river were shot near Shepperton Lock. Filming also took place in Hightown Road, Ringwood, Hampshire, and at Bray Studios in Berkshire.

=== Archival footage ===
The "newsreel" footage that Bill sees at the local cinema in the film contains scenes from the 1969 film Battle of Britain.

== Critical response ==
Hope and Glory received very positive reviews at the time of its release, and was named one of the best films of 1987 by over 50 critics. Only Broadcast News appeared on more top 10 lists in 1987.

On review aggregator website Rotten Tomatoes, the film holds a 96% "Fresh" score based on 26 reviews, with an average rating of 8.3/10. On Metacritic, it has a weighted average score of 86 out of 100 based on 15 critics, indicating "universal acclaim". Audiences polled by CinemaScore gave the film an average grade of "A" on an A+ to F scale.

The film was favourably reviewed by critic Pauline Kael in her film reviews collection Hooked:

It's hard to believe that a great comedy could be made of the Blitz but John Boorman has done it. In his new, autobiographical film, he has had the inspiration to desentimentalize wartime Britain and show us the Second World War the way he saw it as an eight-year-old. The war frees the Rohans from the dismal monotony of their pinched white-collar lives. He doesn't deny the war its terrors. Yet he gives everything a comic flip. That's the joy of the film: the war has its horrors, but it also destroys much of what the genteel poor like Grace Rohan (Sarah Miles) have barely been able to acknowledge they wanted destroyed. It's like a plainspoken, English variant of the Taviani brothers' The Night of the Shooting Stars.

Critic Emanuel Levy's review was also positive, writing: "Director John Boorman offers a warmly nostalgic view of his childhood in a London suburb during WWII."

In 1987, Roger Ebert wrote:

Maybe there is something in the very nature of war, in the power of guns and bombs, that appeals to the imagination of little boys. Bombers and fighter planes and rockets and tanks are thrilling at that age when you are old enough to understand how they work but too young to understand what they do. John Boorman's Hope and Glory is a film about that precise season in the life of a young British boy who grows up in a London suburb during World War II. The film is first of all a painstaking re-creation of the period. All of the cars and signs look right, and there are countless small references to wartime rationing, as when the older sister draws seams on her legs to make fake nylons. But after re-creating the period, Boorman also reconstructs the very feeling that was in the air. Hope and Glory is an enormous success right now in England, where every frame must have its special memories for British audiences. Through American eyes, it is a more universal film, not so much about war as about memory. When we are young, what happens is not nearly as important as what we think happens. Perhaps that's true even when we are not so young.

== Box office ==
Goldcrest Films invested £1,288,000 in the film and received £1,665,000, making them a profit of £377,000.

The film made £845,927 in the UK.

== Awards and nominations ==
Award	Category	Nominee(s)	Result
Academy Awards	Best Picture	John Boorman	Nominated
Academy Awards	Best Director	John Boorman	Nominated
Academy Awards	Best Screenplay – Written Directly for the Screen	John Boorman	Nominated
Academy Awards	Best Art Direction	Art Direction: Anthony D. G. Pratt; Set Decoration: Joanne Woollard	Nominated
Academy Awards	Best Cinematography	Philippe Rousselot	Nominated
Boston Society of Film Critics Awards	Best Film		Won
British Academy Film Awards	Best Film	John Boorman	Nominated
British Academy Film Awards	Best Direction	John Boorman	Nominated
British Academy Film Awards	Best Actress in a Leading Role	Sarah Miles	Nominated
British Academy Film Awards	Best Actor in a Supporting Role	Ian Bannen	Nominated
British Academy Film Awards	Best Actress in a Supporting Role	Susan Wooldridge	Won
British Academy Film Awards	Best Original Screenplay	John Boorman	Nominated
British Academy Film Awards	Best Cinematography	Philippe Rousselot	Nominated
British Academy Film Awards	Best Costume Design	Shirley Ann Russell	Nominated
British Academy Film Awards	Best Editing	Ian Crafford	Nominated
British Academy Film Awards	Best Make Up Artist	Anna Dryhurst	Nominated
British Academy Film Awards	Best Original Score	Peter Martin	Nominated
British Academy Film Awards	Best Production Design	Anthony D. G. Pratt	Nominated
British Academy Film Awards	Best Sound	Ron Davis, Peter Handford, and John Hayward	Nominated
British Society of Cinematographers Awards	Best Cinematography in a Theatrical Feature Film	Philippe Rousselot	Won
Evening Standard British Film Awards	Best Film	John Boorman	Won
Evening Standard British Film Awards	Best Technical or Artistic Achievement	Anthony D. G. Pratt	Won
Golden Globe Awards	Best Motion Picture – Musical or Comedy		Won
Golden Globe Awards	Best Director – Motion Picture	John Boorman	Nominated
Golden Globe Awards	Best Screenplay – Motion Picture	John Boorman	Nominated
Independent Spirit Awards	Best Foreign Film		Nominated
London Film Critics' Circle Awards	Film of the Year		Won
Los Angeles Film Critics Association Awards	Best Film		Won
Los Angeles Film Critics Association Awards	Best Director	John Boorman	Won
Los Angeles Film Critics Association Awards	Best Screenplay	John Boorman	Won
Los Angeles Film Critics Association Awards	Best Cinematography	Philippe Rousselot	Runner-up
Mainichi Film Awards	Best Foreign Language Film	John Boorman	Won
National Board of Review Awards	Top Ten Films		8th Place
National Society of Film Critics Awards	Best Film		2nd Place
National Society of Film Critics Awards	Best Director	John Boorman	Won
National Society of Film Critics Awards	Best Screenplay	John Boorman	Won
National Society of Film Critics Awards	Best Cinematography	Philippe Rousselot	Won
New York Film Critics Circle Awards	Best Film		Runner-up
New York Film Critics Circle Awards	Best Director	John Boorman	Nominated
New York Film Critics Circle Awards	Best Screenplay	John Boorman	Nominated
Tokyo International Film Festival	Tokyo Grand Prix	John Boorman	Nominated
Tokyo International Film Festival	Best Artistic Contribution Award	John Boorman	Won
Writers Guild of America Awards	Best Screenplay – Written Directly for the Screen	John Boorman	Nominated
Young Artist Awards	Best Family Motion Picture – Drama		Nominated
Young Artist Awards	Best Young Actor in a Motion Picture – Drama	Sebastian Rice-Edwards	Nominated

== Sequel ==
A sequel to the film, titled Queen and Country, was made in 2014. The sequel tells the story of an older Bill Rohan as a soldier during the Korean War. It was selected to be screened as part of the Directors' Fortnight section of the 2014 Cannes Film Festival, and received a general theatrical release in 2015.

== See also ==
- BFI Top 100 British films
