= Wang Lianshou =

Wet nurse of Puyi, the last emperor of China (1887–1946)

- Traditional Chinese: 王連壽
- Simplified Chinese: 王连寿
Transcriptions
Standard Mandarin
- Hanyu Pinyin: Wáng Liánshòu
- Wade–Giles: Wang2 Lien2-shou4

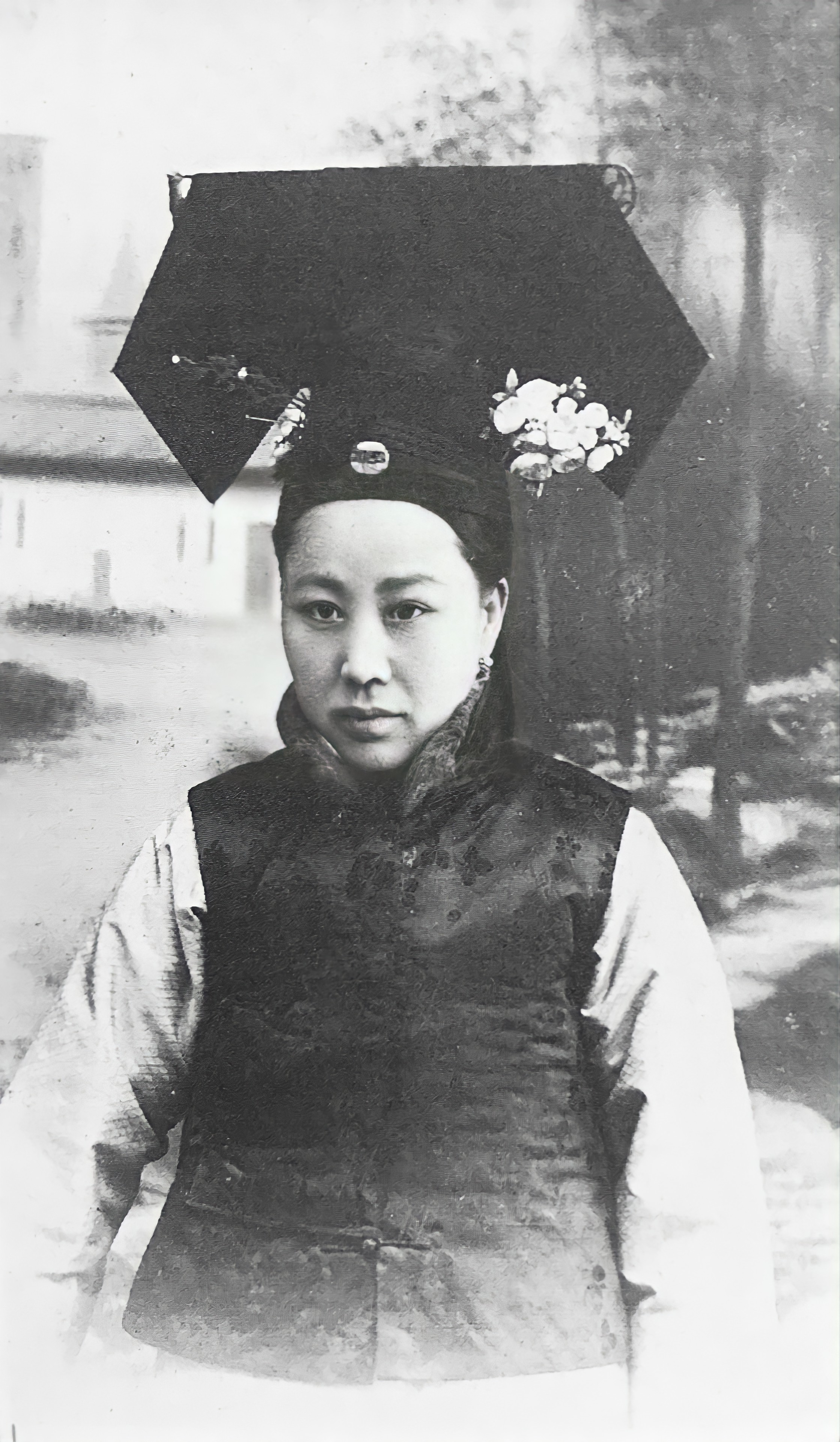
Wang Lianshou

Wang Lianshou (traditional Chinese: 王連壽; simplified Chinese: 王连寿; 1887 — 3 February 1946) was a Chinese court lady. She was the imperial wet nurse of Puyi, the last Emperor of China and final ruler of the Qing dynasty. Wang played a prominent role in the nurture of Puyi. Puyi long regarded Wang Lianshou as his mother because of her dedication to him.

== Biography ==
Wang Lianshou was born in 1887 in Renqiu county (now Jiaoyuanzhuang, Dacheng County, Hebei Province). At the age of 13, she fled to Beijing due to floods in her hometown. Born with the surname Jiao (焦), she married a servant surnamed Wang (王), who died of illness after she gave birth to a daughter. Later, Puyi bequeathed her the name of "Wang Lianshou," with "Wang" coming from her late husband and "Lianshou" meaning "continued longevity." In 1906, the year Puyi was born, a recruitment notice was posted at the palace gate, looking for a wet nurse for Puyi. After she saw the notice, she applied and was selected among 20 candidates for her good appearance and the quality of her milk. Two years after entering the palace, her own biological daughter starved to death, which she did not learn about until 6 years later.

During the time she was feeding Puyi, they established a very tight bond. It has been said that she was a guiding light on the road of Puyi's life. She was the only person from the Northern Mansion allowed to go with Puyi. Puyi did not see his biological mother, Princess Consort Chun, for seven years. He developed a special bond with Wang and credited her as the only person who could control him; once, Puyi decided to "reward" a eunuch for a well done puppet show by having a cake baked for him with iron filings in it, saying, "I want to see what he looks like when he eats it". With much difficulty, Wang talked Puyi out of this plan.

When Puyi was weaned at the age of nine, the dowagers decided that she was useless, so they threw her out without telling Puyi. After she left the palace, Puyi lost his temper and didn't listen to anyone. He kept asking the eunuchs and court ladies to find his wet nurse. Puyi especially hated Empress Dowager Longyu for expelling Wang from the Forbidden City. After Puyi married, he would occasionally bring Wang to the Forbidden City to visit him. After Puyi became the emperor of Manchukuo, he sought her out and brought her back to live in the palace.

In her autobiography, Hiro Saga provided an account surrounding Wang's death, mentioning how she, her daughter Husheng, Wanrong, Wang, and many others of the imperial household were captured by communist troops, transferred to the Public Security Bureau of Tonghua, and caught in the midst of the Tonghua incident. It was then that Wang was hit in the right wrist by a shell that flew into the building (Note: Another source claims that she was instead hit by a bullet in one of her right hand fingers.) and bled out, as there was nothing around to stop the bleeding with.

== In popular culture ==
- Wang was portrayed by Jade Go as the character Ar Mo in the 1987 film The Last Emperor.
