= William John Francis Jenner =

British historian (born 1940)

- Born: 1940 (age 85–86)
- Occupations: Sinologist, translator

Academic background
- Education: University of Oxford
- Thesis: Memories of Loyang. Yang Hsüan-chih and the Lost Capital

Academic work
- Discipline: Sinology
- Institutions: University of Leeds, Australian National University, University of East Anglia.
- Main interests: Chinese history, Chinese literature

William John Francis "Bill" Jenner (Chinese: 詹纳尓; born 1940) is an English sinologist and translator, specialising in Chinese history and culture, and translator of Chinese literature.

== Biography ==
William (Bill) Jenner was educated from 1953 to 1958 at Westminster School and from 1958 to 1962 at the University of Oxford where he studied sinology and wrote his dissertation about the history of Luoyang in the fifth and sixth centuries, especially through the work of Yang Xuanzhi. His first wife was the China scholar Delia Davin.

From 1963 to 1965, he worked as a translator at Foreign Languages Press in Beijing. There he translated From Emperor to Citizen, an "autobiography" of the last Emperor of China, Puyi, and started translating the novel Journey to the West into English.

Since 1965, Jenner has taught at the University of Leeds, Australian National University and the University of East Anglia.

From 1979 to 1985, Jenner travelled to China every summer, and worked on the translation of Journey to the West and other works, for example by Lu Xun. He has written about the process and politics of translating and publishing Journey to the West in an essay published in the Los Angeles Review of Books (3 Feb 2016).

He was elected a Corresponding Fellow of the Australian Academy of the Humanities in 1998.

His most recent project is The History of China in two volumes.

Jenner has two daughters, one son and seven grandchildren.

== Partial bibliography ==
=== Translations ===
- Cheng'en, Wu. Journey to the West. W.J.F. Jenner (translator). Beijing: Foreign Languages Press.
- Xun, Lu (1982). Selected Poems. W.J.F. Jenner (translator). Beijing: Foreign Languages Press.
- Ling, Ding (1985). Miss Sophie's Diary and Other Stories. W.J.F. Jenner (translator). Beijing: Panda Books / Chinese Literature Press.
- Various (1970). Modern Chinese Stories. W.J.F. Jenner (translator) and Gladys Yang (translator). Oxford University Press.
- Various (1987). Chinese Lives. An Oral History of Contemporary China. W.J.F. Jenner (translator), Delia Davin (translator) and Cheng Lingfang (translator). New York: Pantheon.
- Pu Yi, Aisin-Gioro (1987). From Emperor to Citizen. The Autobiography of Aisin-Gioro Pu Yi. W.J.F. Jenner (translator). Oxford University Press.

Pu Yi, Aisin-Gioro (1992). From Emperor to Citizen. The Autobiography of Aisin-Gioro Pu Yi. W.J.F. Jenner (translator). Beijing: Foreign Languages Press.

- Leping, Zhang (1981). Adventures of Sanmao the Orphan. W.J.F. Jenner (translator) and C.M. Chan (translator). Hong Kong: Joint Publications.
- Jen, Yu-wen (1969). The Taiping Revolutionary Movement.

=== Monographs ===
- Jenner, W.J.F. (1981). Memories of Loyang. Yang Hsüan-chih and the Lost Capital, 493–534. Oxford / New York: Clarendon Press / Oxford University Press.
- Jenner, W.J.F. (1992). The Tyranny of History. The Roots of China's Crisis. London: Penguin.
- Jenner, W.J.F. (1993). A Knife in My Ribs for a Mate. Reflections on Another Chinese Tradition. Canberra: Australian National University.

=== Articles ===
- Jenner, W.J.F. (September–October 2001). "Race and History in China". New Left Review. II (11).
- Jenner, W.J.F. (June 1981). "1979: A New Start for Literature in China?". The China Quarterly. 86: 274–303. doi:10.1017/S0305741000028460.
- Jenner, W.J.F. (January–February 1971). "Introduction to Mao's "Letter to Comrade Lin Piao"". New Left Review. I (65).
- Jenner, W.J.F. (January–February 1969). "The New Chinese Revolution". New Left Review. I (53).
- Jenner, W.J.F. (January–February 1967). "History in the Manufacture". New Left Review. I (41).
- Jenner, W.J.F. (Winter 1962). "China Today". New Left Review. I (17).
