= Moonstruck =

1987 film by Norman Jewison

- Theatrical release poster
- Directed by: Norman Jewison
- Written by: John Patrick Shanley
- Produced by: Patrick Palmer; Norman Jewison
- Starring: Cher; Nicolas Cage; Vincent Gardenia; Olympia Dukakis; Danny Aiello
- Cinematography: David Watkin
- Edited by: Lou Lombardo
- Music by: Dick Hyman
- Production companies: Metro-Goldwyn-Mayer; Star Partners II Ltd.
- Distributed by: MGM/UA Communications Co.
- Release date: December 18, 1987
- Running time: 102 minutes
- Country: United States
- Language: English
- Budget: $15 million
- Box office: $122.1 million

Moonstruck is a 1987 American romantic comedy film directed by Norman Jewison and written by John Patrick Shanley. It stars Cher as a widowed Italian American woman who falls in love with her fiancé's hot-tempered, estranged younger brother, played by Nicolas Cage. The supporting cast includes Vincent Gardenia, Olympia Dukakis, and Danny Aiello.

Moonstruck had a limited theatrical release in the United States on December 18, 1987, followed by a wide release on January 15, 1988, by Metro-Goldwyn-Mayer. The film earned critical and commercial success. It received six nominations at the 60th Academy Awards, winning three for Best Actress (Cher), Best Supporting Actress (Dukakis), and Best Original Screenplay (Shanley).

== Plot ==
Italian-American widow Loretta Castorini works as a bookkeeper and lives in Brooklyn Heights with her parents Cosmo and Rose and her paternal grandfather. Loretta's boyfriend, Johnny Cammareri, proposes to her before leaving for Sicily to tend to his dying mother. Loretta accepts, insisting on following tradition as she believes failing to do so led to her first husband's sudden death after two years of marriage.

Johnny asks Loretta to invite his estranged younger brother Ronny—whom Johnny hasn't spoken to in five years—to the wedding. Cosmo, who runs a successful plumbing business, dislikes Johnny and is reluctant to pay for a formal wedding. Rose is relieved that Loretta is not in love with Johnny, as she warns that the men women love can hurt them the most.

Loretta visits Ronny at the bakery, but Ronny refuses to attend the wedding. He says he was engaged once, but his fiancée left him after he lost his hand in a bread slicer. Ronny blames Johnny for causing the accident by distracting him. Loretta is persistent and cooks Ronny a steak at his apartment, explaining that Ronny is like a wolf who gnaws off its own paw to escape a trap. The accident was not Johnny's fault. Ronny was simply escaping a bad relationship. Ronny reacts furiously and passionately, kissing Loretta. Ronny carries Loretta to his bed where they have sex.

Cosmo and Rose have a family dinner and wonder where Loretta is. Rose's brother Raymond remembers when Cosmo was courting his sister and a giant moon woke him up. He blamed Cosmo, because he thought Cosmo brought the moon to their house.

Loretta feels guilty about her affair. Ronny promises to never bother her again if she goes to the Met with him. Loretta goes to confession. She impulsively decides to get her hair done and buys an outfit for the opera.

At the Met, Giacomo Puccini's La bohème deeply moves Loretta. Meanwhile, Rose dines alone at a local restaurant. Loretta sees her father Cosmo with his mistress Mona. She confronts him, but he points out that she is with Johnny's brother. They agree to keep their encounter a secret.

Rose witnesses New York University professor Perry get dumped by one of his students. He joins her for dinner. After the opera, Ronny leads Loretta back to his apartment and desperately persuades her to ruin herself with him.

Perry walks Rose home, but she refuses his advances because she knows who she is. Johnny Cammareri surprises Rose at the house. She asks him why men cheat, and they surmise it must be a fear of death.

When Loretta returns home in the morning, she is distressed to learn Johnny is back. Ronny arrives, and Rose invites him inside. At breakfast, Rose demands Cosmo end his affair and go to confession. They reaffirm their love for each other.

Johnny arrives and explains he cannot marry Loretta because it would kill his mother. Loretta is furious and throws Johnny's ring at him. Ronny borrows it to ask Loretta to marry him. She agrees and everyone toasts their engagement.

== Cast ==
- Cher as Loretta Castorini
- Nicolas Cage as Ronny Cammareri
- Olympia Dukakis as Rose Castorini
- Vincent Gardenia as Cosmo Castorini
- Danny Aiello as Mr. Johnny Cammareri
- Julie Bovasso as Rita Cappomagi (Note: There is an error in the credits: that name has "gg", but in the film scene the name appears in the shop window, written as Cappomagi, with only one "g".)
- Louis Guss as Raymond Cappomagi
- John Mahoney as Perry
- Feodor Chaliapin as Grandpa Castorini / Old Man
- Anita Gillette as Mona
- Leonardo Cimino as Felix
- Paula Trueman as Lucy
- Nada Despotovich as Chrissy
- Joe Grifasi as Shy Waiter
- Gina DeAngeles as Old Crone
- Robin Bartlett as Barbara
- Helen Hanft as Lotte
- David S. Howard as Irv
- Robert Weil as Bobo
- Patricia Magrini as Benjamin's Secretary
- Amy Aquino as Bonnie

== Production ==
Sally Field admired John Patrick Shanley's work and invited him to lunch at the Russian Tea Room to discuss a collaboration. He wrote a screenplay for her that he called The Bride and the Wolf. Shanley promised Field it would earn her an Oscar nomination, but she had a hard time picturing herself as an Italian from Brooklyn. Because his plays were frequently compared to operas, Shanley started going to the Metropolitan Opera. He was particularly drawn to Giacomo Puccini's La bohème and wrote the character of Ronny as a bohemian.

The script made its way to Norman Jewison who loved it, but insisted on a name change because the title sounded like a horror film. He got Shanley to cut out most of the dialogue and pitched it to Alan Ladd Jr. and John Goldwyn when they were in Canada for the 1986 Toronto film festival. Jewison's pitch included Cher in the lead role. Like Field, she also balked over the Brooklyn Italian nature of the role, given that she was neither.

When Jewison pitched the role to Cher, she warned him that she could be difficult. He replied, "Are you any more difficult than Judy Garland?" He also warned her that she would spend the rest of her life regretting turning down the role. He cast the rest of the roles as if the movie were an opera, "Loretta is the soprano. Rose is the alto, Johnny is the baritone, Ronnie the tenor, Cosmo the bass."

Ronny Cammareri was the same age as Loretta Castorini in the script. Ray Liotta auditioned, but Jewison dismissed him as too young. Raul Julia, John Turturro, and Al Pacino were all considered for the role. It finally came down to Peter Gallagher and Nicolas Cage. The chemistry between Cher and Cage was obvious on the screen tests. Cher admired the risk Cage took with his Gumby accent in Peggy Sue Got Married. While she liked Gallagher, she concluded, "Nicky was nuts, and 'nuts' is what we needed."

After the death of his cousin Gian-Carlo Coppola, Cage was at a low point and turning down work. He disliked the mainstream sensibility of Shanley's script. He was far more interested in accepting Vampire's Kiss, but his agent Ed Limato forbade it unless he agree to do Moonstruck. Ronny Cammareri's wooden hand was what ultimately hooked Cage on the role. He wanted to replicate the moment in Fritz Lang's Metropolis when Rotwang holds up a robot hand that he invented. Cage saw the character as analogous to the beast in Beauty and the Beast. He emulated Jean Marais' voice from Jean Cocteau's 1946 film until Jewison talked him out of it.

Most of the filming took place in Toronto in early 1987. Jewison described the final scene as the most difficult to film in his entire career. Julie Bovasso was the production's dialect coach and helped Cher master a Brooklyn accent in a few weeks. While filming the final scene, she urged Cage to speak louder and faster, prompting him to throw a chair.

Cammareri Brothers Bakery was located in Carroll Gardens, Brooklyn. Ronny and Loretta were scripted to meet upstairs, but when Jewison saw the coal ovens in the basement, he relocated the scene.

The light of the giant moon was designed by cinematographer David Watkin, who clustered parabolic aluminized reflectors into giant fay lights that lit up Brooklyn. Ronny's climactic speech after the opera was filmed in freezing temperatures. The script's vestigial verbosity called for Ronny to describe himself as red meat and his brother as milk and cookies. Cage had to be convinced to say the lines, which ended up being cut from the film. Shanley concluded that actors "know what fits in their mouth and what doesn't."

Jewison took the cast to see La bohème in order to get them in an operatic frame of mind. Puccini's "O soave fanciulla" plays during Ronny and Loretta's love scene. The film includes eleven other cues from La bohème. During the actual scene at the Metropolitan Opera, Cher and Cage were looking at an empty stage as a recording played and Jewison summarized the plot of Puccini's opera.

Puccini's music scored the opening of the film's original cut. Audiences at test screenings did not view the film as a comedy, and Jewison realized the operatic score was setting the wrong tone. When the opening music was replaced with Dean Martin's "That's Amore", audiences laughed along to the entire movie.

== Reception ==
=== Box office ===
On its wide release, the film finished third at the US box office and spent 20 nonconsecutive weeks in the top 10 and finally grossed $80.6 million in the United States and Canada. Internationally it grossed $41.5 million for a worldwide total of $122.1 million, on a budget of $15 million.

=== Critical response ===
Moonstruck received critical acclaim upon release. In The New Yorker, Pauline Kael called Moonstruck a "rose-tinted black comedy" that "could become a holiday perennial". She recognized Shanley's script as an "opera buffa in which the arias are the lines the characters deliver". Roger Ebert, who later added the film among his "Great Movies" list, said: "Reviews of the movie tend to make it sound like a madcap ethnic comedy, and that it is. But there is something more here, a certain bittersweet yearning that comes across as ineffably romantic, and a certain magical quality". Film historian Leonard Maltin gave the picture 4 out of 4 stars.

Gene Siskel, writing for the Chicago Tribune, recommended "Moonstruck, which is being sold as a romance but actually is one of the funniest pictures to come out in quite some time. [...] You will not easily forget this incredibly robust family, created by writer John Patrick Shanley and directed by Norman Jewison, who makes a comeback with this uproarious film." Time wrote, "John Patrick Shanley's witty, shapely script puts an octet of New Yorkers under a lunar-tuney spell one romantic night. Cher shines brightest of all."

It appeared on both Siskel's and Ebert's Top 10 lists for 1987. In 2018, Billboard ranked Cher's work the all-time greatest acting performance by a musician.

On the review aggregator website Rotten Tomatoes, 89% of 74 critics' reviews are positive. The website's consensus reads: "Led by energetic performances from Nicolas Cage and Cher, Moonstruck is an exuberantly funny tribute to love and one of the decade's most appealing comedies." On Metacritic, the film has a weighted average score of 83 out of 100 based on 18 critics, which the site labels as "universal acclaim". The film's CinemaScore is an "A−".

In an appraisal of Cage's work, Manohla Dargis wrote, "There's something of Brando in the way Cage confronts Cher in Moonstruck (1987), wearing a soiled white t-shirt, radiating heartbreaking masculine pathos, his arms muscular, his shoulders rounded with disappointment. There's something of Brando as well in the way Cage fully uses his body, now and then, to punishing effect."

Another critic underscored the moral of the film, "Moonstruck does not really target Cosmo's philandering, or Ronny's anger at his brother, or Loretta's denial of her sexuality, so much as the fear, self-pity, or self-absorption that causes each of these characters to withdraw from the values the film associates with being alive. And in Moonstruck, it is men more than women who are especially vulnerable to such fear and misguided in their response to it."

== Accolades ==
Award	Category	Nominee(s)	Result	Ref.
Academy Awards	Best Picture	Norman Jewison and Patrick Palmer	Nominated	
Academy Awards	Best Director	Norman Jewison	Nominated	
Academy Awards	Best Actress	Cher	Won	
Academy Awards	Best Supporting Actor	Vincent Gardenia	Nominated	
Academy Awards	Best Supporting Actress	Olympia Dukakis	Won	
Academy Awards	Best Original Screenplay	John Patrick Shanley	Won	
American Comedy Awards	Funniest Actress in a Motion Picture (Leading Role)	Cher	Nominated	
American Comedy Awards	Funniest Supporting Male Performer – Motion Picture or TV	Vincent Gardenia	Nominated	
American Comedy Awards	Funniest Supporting Female Performer – Motion Picture or TV	Olympia Dukakis	Won	
Artios Awards	Outstanding Achievement in Feature Film Casting – Comedy	Howard Feuer	Won	
ASCAP Film and Television Music Awards	Top Box Office Films	Dick Hyman	Won	
Berlin International Film Festival	Golden Bear	Norman Jewison	Nominated	
Berlin International Film Festival	Best Director	Norman Jewison	Won	
British Academy Film Awards	Best Actress in a Leading Role	Cher	Nominated	
British Academy Film Awards	Best Actress in a Supporting Role	Olympia Dukakis	Nominated	
British Academy Film Awards	Best Original Screenplay	John Patrick Shanley	Nominated	
British Academy Film Awards	Best Film Music	Dick Hyman	Nominated	
David di Donatello Awards	Best Foreign Actress	Cher	Won	
David di Donatello Awards	Best Foreign Screenplay	John Patrick Shanley	Nominated	
Golden Globe Awards	Best Motion Picture – Musical or Comedy		Nominated	
Golden Globe Awards	Best Actor in a Motion Picture – Musical or Comedy	Nicolas Cage	Nominated	
Golden Globe Awards	Best Actress in a Motion Picture – Musical or Comedy	Cher	Won	
Golden Globe Awards	Best Supporting Actress – Motion Picture	Olympia Dukakis	Won	
Golden Globe Awards	Best Screenplay – Motion Picture	John Patrick Shanley	Nominated	
Japan Academy Film Prize	Outstanding Foreign Language Film		Nominated	
Jupiter Awards	Best International Actress	Cher	Nominated	
Kansas City Film Critics Circle Awards	Best Film		Won	
Kansas City Film Critics Circle Awards	Best Actress	Cher	Won	
Kansas City Film Critics Circle Awards	Best Supporting Actress	Olympia Dukakis	Won	
Los Angeles Film Critics Association Awards	Best Supporting Actress	Olympia Dukakis	Won	
Los Angeles Film Critics Association Awards	Best Screenplay	John Patrick Shanley	Runner-up	
Nastro d'Argento	Best Foreign Actress	Cher	Won	
Nastro d'Argento	Best Female Dubbing	Ludovica Modugno (for dubbing Cher)	Won	
National Board of Review Awards	Best Supporting Actress	Olympia Dukakis	Won	
New York Film Critics Circle Awards	Best Supporting Actress	Olympia Dukakis	Runner-up	
Sant Jordi Awards	Best Foreign Actress	Cher	Nominated	
Writers Guild of America Awards	Best Screenplay – Written Directly for the Screen	John Patrick Shanley	Won	

== Legacy ==
In 2001, Nicolas Cage's production company Saturn Films began work on a Moonstruck sequel called The Seven Fishes. The project fizzled out. John Patrick Shanley mused that if he wrote Moonstruck II it would be about Ronny trying to win Loretta back after their divorce..

In June 2008, AFI revealed its "Ten top Ten"—the best ten films in ten "classic" American film genres—after polling over 1,500 people from the creative community. Moonstruck was acknowledged as the eighth best film in the romantic comedy genre. The film is also number 72 on Bravo's "100 Funniest Movies," and number 41 on AFI's 100 Years... 100 Laughs.

The film is recognized by American Film Institute in these lists:

- 2000: AFI's 100 Years...100 Laughs – #41
- 2002: AFI's 100 Years...100 Passions – #17
- 2005: AFI's 100 Years...100 Movie Quotes:
  - Loretta Castorini: "Snap out of it!" – #96
- 2008: AFI's 10 Top 10:
  - #8 Romantic Comedy Film

Influential film critic Roger Ebert entered the film to his "Great Movies" collection in June 2003. In 2006, Writers Guild of America West ranked its screenplay 62nd in WGA's list of 101 Greatest Screenplays.

== Home media ==
Moonstruck was released on VHS and LaserDisc in 1988 following its theatrical release. It was released on DVD in 1998. It was released on Blu-ray by MGM on February 15, 2011. The Criterion Collection released a remastered Blu-ray on November 17, 2020.

== Soundtrack ==
Song	Artist	Notes
That's Amore	Dean Martin	Harry Warren, Jack Brooks
Canzone Per Loretta/Addio, Mulberry Street	Jack Zaza (mandolin)	Dick Hyman
Mr. Moon		Dick Hyman
It Must Be Him	Vikki Carr	Gilbert Bécaud, Mack David, Maurice Vidalin
Old Man Mazurka	Dominic Cortese (accordion)	Dick Hyman
Lament for Johnny's Mama		Dick Hyman
Che gelida manina	Ed Bickert (guitar)	Giacomo Puccini
Donde lieta uscì	Renata Tebaldi	Giacomo Puccini
Canzone Per Loretta		Dick Hyman
O soave fanciulla	Carlo Bergonzi, Renata Tebaldi	Giacomo Puccini
Musetta's Waltz	Moe Koffman (alto saxophone)	Giacomo Puccini
Musetta's Entrance	Nora Shulman (flute)	Giacomo Puccini
La bohème (instrumental excerpts)		Giacomo Puccini
(In Loretta's Bedroom) Gettin' Ready	Moe Koffman (alto saxophone)	Dick Hyman
Brooklyn Heights Stroll		Dick Hyman
Beautiful Signorina		Dick Hyman
Moonglow		Eddie DeLange, Will Hudson, Irving Mills
Canzone Per Loretta	Dominic Cortese (accordion)	Dick Hyman
Gioventù mia, tu non sei morta (La bohème, act 2)	Carlo Bergonzi, Cesare Siepi, Ettore Bastianini, Fernando Corena, Gianna D'Angelo, Renata Tebaldi, Renato Cesari	Giacomo Puccini

^{Soundtrack references:}
