= Carrie Rickey =

American film critic

- Born: November 26, 1952 (age 73); Los Angeles, California, U.S.
- Education: University of California, San Diego
- Occupations: Film critic, art critic, journalist, author
- Years active: 1980–present
- Employer: The Philadelphia Inquirer (1986–2011)
- Notable work: A Complicated Passion: The Life and Work of Agnès Varda (2024)
- Awards: Los Angeles Press Club– Best Commentary (Film/Television) (2018); Mid-Atlantic Emmy – Best Documentary (2018)
- Website: carrierickey.com

Carrie Rickey (born November 26, 1952) is an American film critic. Rickey was a film critic for The Philadelphia Inquirer from 1986 to 2011, and has contributed to The New York Times, San Francisco Chronicle, and Village Voice.

Her essays are collected in many books including The American Century and American Movie Critics. Rickey was an early champion of female filmmakers. During her tenure as a movie reviewer, she covered technological evolutions in the industry from the video revolution to the rise of digital film, and has profiled artists and filmmakers from Clint Eastwood and Sidney Poitier to Elizabeth Taylor and Nora Ephron.

== Early life and education ==
Rickey grew up in Los Angeles, California, where she developed a lifelong interest in film. She attended the University of California, San Diego (AB 1974, MFA 1976) where she studied with Manny Farber and worked as his teaching assistant. Between 1975 and 1976 Rickey participated in the Whitney Museum of American Art's Independent Study Program.

== Career ==
From 1980 to 1983, Rickey was a film critic at the Village Voice. She wrote one of the first retrospectives of the work of filmmaker Ida Lupino and one of the first considerations of filmmaker David Cronenberg. She then became a film critic for The Boston Herald (1984–85) and also wrote for Artforum and Art in America as an art critic. She has served on numerous juries, including the New York Film Festival from 1988 to 1991.

In 1986, Rickey became the film critic at The Philadelphia Inquirer, a position she held for the next 25 years. She has written essays on many artists such as Leon Golub and Philip Guston and wrote the Criterion Collection essays for Broadcast News and Videodrome. She has also taught courses at the University of Pennsylvania School of Arts and Sciences.

Rickey contributed chapters to The Power of Feminist Art, The Rolling Stone Illustrated History of Rock and Roll, among many other collections. She is included in the book Feminists Who Changed America for her role in chronicling the work and the progress of women artists and filmmakers in articles and catalogue essays.

In 2018, she won the award for Best Commentary (Film/Television) from the L.A. Press Club for her serve, "What Ever Happened to Women Directors?" and won a regional Emmy (Mid-Atlantic division) for best Documentary for the film, "Before Hollywood: Philadelphia and the Birth of the Movies."

== A Complicated Passion ==
Rickey's biography, A Complicated Passion: The Life and Work of Agnès Varda (2024), is described as part career chronicle, part personal portrait, part cultural history. The New York Times Dwight Garner called it "Perceptive … Rickey's narrative threatens at times to turn into an annotated filmography. But I devoured A Complicated Passion happily", while The Wall Street Journal's Erin Carlson noted that "Rickey’s book often reads as briskly as a fast-paced thriller." The New Yorker hailed it as "an enthralling new biography [that] shows the boldness and the freedom with which the French director confronted professional obstacles and personal troubles"; Publishers Weekly judged it "a must for cinephiles"; and Kirkus Reviews praised the book as "an immersive portrait of a groundbreaking filmmaker." TIME magazine described it as "a love letter to your favorite filmmaker’s favorite filmmaker."
