= The Last Emperor =

1987 biographical film by Bernardo Bertolucci

- Italian theatrical release poster by Renato Casaro
- Directed by: Bernardo Bertolucci
- Screenplay by: Mark Peploe; Bernardo Bertolucci
- Based on: From Emperor to Citizen: The Autobiography of Aisin-Gioro Puyi by Puyi
- Produced by: Jeremy Thomas
- Starring: John Lone; Joan Chen; Peter O'Toole; Ying Ruocheng; Victor Wong; Dennis Dun; Ryuichi Sakamoto
- Cinematography: Vittorio Storaro
- Edited by: Gabriella Cristiani
- Music by: Ryuichi Sakamoto; David Byrne; Cong Su
- Production companies: Hemdale Film Corporation; Recorded Picture Company; Yanco Films; TAO Film; Acteurs Auteurs Associés
- Distributed by: Columbia Pictures (international); Acteurs Auteurs Associés (France)
- Release dates: 4 October 1987 (Tokyo); 23 October 1987 (Italy); 25 November 1987 (France); 26 February 1988 (UK)
- Running time: 163 minutes
- Countries: United Kingdom; Italy; France; China
- Languages: English; Mandarin; Japanese
- Budget: $23.8 million
- Box office: $44 million

The Last Emperor (Italian: L'ultimo imperatore) is a 1987 epic biographical drama film about the life of Puyi, the last Emperor of China. It is directed by Bernardo Bertolucci from a screenplay he co-wrote with Mark Peploe, which was adapted from Puyi's 1964 autobiography, and independently produced by Jeremy Thomas.

The film depicts Puyi's life from his ascent to the throne as an infant to his imprisonment and political rehabilitation by the Chinese Communist Party. It stars John Lone in the eponymous role, with Peter O'Toole, Joan Chen, Ruocheng Ying, Victor Wong, Dennis Dun, Vivian Wu, Lisa Lu, and Ryuichi Sakamoto (who also composed the film score with David Byrne and Cong Su). It was the first Western feature film authorised by the People's Republic of China to film in the Forbidden City in Beijing.

The Last Emperor premiered at the 1987 Tokyo International Film Festival, and was released in the United States by Columbia Pictures on November 18. It earned widespread positive reviews from critics and was also a commercial success. At the 60th Academy Awards, it won all nine Oscars it was nominated for, including Best Picture, Best Director, and Best Adapted Screenplay. It also won several other accolades, including three BAFTA Awards, four Golden Globe Awards, nine David di Donatello Awards, and a Grammy Award for its musical score. The film was converted into 3D and shown in the Cannes Classics section at the 2013 Cannes Film Festival.

== Plot ==
By 1950, the 44-year-old Puyi, former Emperor of China, has been in custody for five years since his capture by the Red Army during the Soviet invasion of Manchuria. In the recently established People's Republic of China, Puyi arrives as a political prisoner and war criminal at the Fushun Prison. Soon after his arrival, Puyi attempts suicide, but is quickly rescued and told he must stand trial.

Forty-two years earlier, in 1908, a toddler Puyi is summoned to the Forbidden City by the dying Empress Dowager Cixi. After telling him that the previous emperor had died earlier that day, Cixi tells Puyi that he is to be the next emperor. After his coronation, Puyi, frightened by his new surroundings, repeatedly expresses his wish to go home, but is denied. Despite having scores of palace eunuchs and maids to wait on him, his only real friend is his wet nurse, Ar Mo.

As he grows up, his upbringing is confined entirely to the imperial palace and he is prohibited from leaving. One day, he is visited by his younger brother, Pujie, who tells him he is no longer Emperor and that China has become a republic; that same day, Ar Mo is forced to leave. In 1919, Reginald Johnston is appointed as Puyi's tutor and gives him a Western-style education, and Puyi becomes increasingly desirous to leave the Forbidden City. Johnston, wary of the courtiers' expensive lifestyle, convinces Puyi that the best way of achieving this is through marriage; Puyi subsequently marries Wanrong, with Wenxiu as a secondary consort.

Puyi then sets about reforming the Forbidden City, including expelling the palace eunuchs. However, in 1924, he himself is expelled from the palace and exiled to Tientsin following the Beijing Coup. He leads a decadent life as a playboy and Anglophile, and sides with Japan after the Mukden Incident. During this time, Wenxiu divorces him, but Wanrong remains and eventually succumbs to opium addiction. In 1934, the Japanese crown him "Emperor" of their puppet state of Manchukuo, though his supposed political supremacy is undermined at every turn. Wanrong gives birth to an illegitimate child, but the baby is murdered at birth by the Japanese and proclaimed stillborn. She is then taken to a clinic where her physical and mental state declines even further. Puyi remains the nominal ruler of the region until Japan's capitulation. He decides to surrender to the Americans but before he can leave, he is captured by the Soviet Red Army and handed over to the Chinese.

Under the Communist re-education program for political prisoners, Puyi is coerced by his interrogators to formally renounce his forced collaboration with the Japanese invaders during the Second Sino-Japanese War. After heated discussions with Jin Yuan, the warden of the Fushun Prison, and watching a film detailing the wartime atrocities committed by the Japanese, Puyi eventually recants and is considered rehabilitated by the government; he is subsequently released in 1959.

Several years later in 1967, Puyi has become a simple gardener who lives a peasant proletarian existence following the rise of Mao Zedong's cult of personality and the Cultural Revolution. On his way home from work, he happens upon a Red Guard parade, celebrating the rejection of landlordism by the communists. He sees Jin Yuan, now one of the political prisoners punished as an anti-revolutionary in the parade, forced to wear a dunce cap and a sandwich board bearing punitive slogans.

Puyi visits the Palace Museum and starts to climb the throne dais. A young Pioneer boy, the son of the museum guardian, warns him away. When Puyi says that he was once emperor, the boy demands proof. Puyi reaches behind the throne and retrieves a jar containing the pet cricket that palace official Chen Baochen gave him at his coronation. The boy inspects the jar, then notices that Puyi has vanished. He looks back at the jar and sees the cricket emerge.

In 1987, a tour guide leads a group through the palace. Stopping in front of the throne, the guide sums up Puyi's life in a few, brief sentences, before concluding that he died in 1967.

== Cast ==
- John Lone as Puyi (adult)
  - Richard Vuu as Puyi (3 years old)
  - Tijger Tsou as Puyi (8 years old)
  - Wu Tao as Puyi (15 years old)
- Joan Chen as Wanrong
- Peter O'Toole as Reginald Johnston
- Ying Ruocheng as Jin Yuan, the Detention Camp Governor
- Victor Wong as Chen Baochen
- Dennis Dun as Big Li
- Ryuichi Sakamoto as Masahiko Amakasu
- Maggie Han as Eastern Jewel (Yoshiko Kawashima)
- Ric Young as the Camp Interrogator
- Vivian Wu as Wenxiu
- Cary-Hiroyuki Tagawa as Chang
- Jade Go as Ar Mo
- Fumihiko Ikeda as Colonel Yoshioka
- Fan Guang as Pujie (adult), Puyi's younger brother
  - Henry Kyi as Pujie (7 years old)
  - Alvin Riley III as Pujie (14 years old)
- Lisa Lu as Empress Dowager Cixi
- Basil Pao as Prince Chun, Puyi's father.
- Dong Liang as Lady Consort Chun, Puyi's mother.
- Henry O as the Lord Chamberlain

Other cast members include Chen Kaige as the Captain of the Imperial Guard, Hideo Takamatsu as General Takashi Hishikari, Hajime Tachibana as the General's translator, Zhang Liangbin as the eunuch Big Foot, Huang Wenjie as the eunuch Hunchback, Chen Shu as Zhang Jinghui, Cheng Shuyan as Hiro Saga, Li Fusheng as Xie Jieshi, and Constantine Gregory as the Emperor's oculist. The real Jin Yuan appears as the party boss who delivers Puyi's pardon.

== Production ==
=== Development ===
Bernardo Bertolucci proposed the film to the Chinese government as one of two possible projects – the other was an adaptation of La Condition humaine (Man's Fate) by André Malraux. The Chinese preferred The Last Emperor. Producer Jeremy Thomas managed to raise the $25 million budget for his ambitious independent production single-handedly. At one stage, he scoured the phone book for potential financiers. Bertolucci was given complete freedom by the authorities to shoot in the Forbidden City, which had never before been opened up for use in a Western film. The ancient city was used as the setting for the first 90 minutes of the film as well as the ending.

=== Filming ===
19,000 extras were needed over the course of the film. The People's Liberation Army (PLA) was drafted in to accommodate.

In a 2010 interview with Bilge Ebiri for Vulture.com, Bertolucci recounted the shooting of the Cultural Revolution scene:

Before shooting the parade scene, I put together four or five young directors whom I had met, [including] Chen Kaige — who also plays a part in the film, he's the captain of the guard — and Zhang Yimou. I asked them about the Cultural Revolution. And suddenly it was like I was watching a psychodrama: they started to act out and cry, it was extraordinary. I think there is a relationship between these scenes in The Last Emperor and in 1900. But many things changed between those two films, for me and for the world.

== Historical accuracy ==
British historian Alex von Tunzelmann wrote that the movie considerably downplays and misrepresents the Emperor's cruelty, especially during his youth. As stated by Tunzelmann and Behr (author of the 1987 book The Last Emperor), Puyi engaged in sadistic abuse of palace servants and subordinates during his initial reign well in excess of what Bertolucci's movie portrays, frequently having eunuchs beaten for mild transgressions or no reason at all; in a demonstrative example, the young Emperor once conspired to force a eunuch to eat a cake full of iron filings simply to see the eunuch's reaction, which he was talked out of by his beloved wet nurse with some difficulty. Tunzelmann states that most people worldwide who have heard of Puyi are likely to have an incorrect understanding of this aspect of the Emperor's reign, as the movie is much more popular globally than more accurate biographies.

The film contains several other historical inaccuracies: in real life, Puyi left the Forbidden City when his mother died; as he recounts in his memoirs, he did not have sex with his wives; Puyi actually stopped the Japanese from killing the Empress's lover rather than let him be murdered; although the film mentions the 1924 Beijing Coup, it erroneously claims that the president fled the capital instead of being put under house arrest; the testimonies that Puyi gives to his Chinese interrogators were in fact given at the Tokyo Trials.

Jeremy Thomas recalled the approval process for the screenplay with the Chinese government: "It was less difficult than working with the studio system. They made script notes and made references to change some of the names, then the stamp went on and the door opened and we came."

== Soundtrack ==
While not included on the album soundtrack, the following music was played in the film: "Am I Blue?" (1929), "Auld Lang Syne" (uncredited), and "China Boy" (1922, uncredited). The Northeastern Cradle Song was sung by Ar Mo twice in the film.

== Release ==
Hemdale Film Corporation acquired all North American distribution rights to the film on behalf of producer Thomas, who raised a large sum of the budget himself. Hemdale, in turn, licensed theatrical rights to Columbia Pictures, who were initially reluctant to release it, and only after shooting was completed did the head of Columbia agree to distribute The Last Emperor in North America.

The Last Emperor opened in 19 theatres in Italy and grossed $265,000 in its first weekend. It expanded to 65 theatres in its second weekend and 93 in its third, increasing its weekend gross to $763,000 and grossing $2 million in its first 16 days. Six days after its Italian opening, it opened in Germany and grossed $473,000 in its first weekend from 50 theatres and $1.1 million in its first 10 days. The film had an unusual run in US theatres. It did not enter the weekend box office top 10 until its twelfth week in which the film reached number 7 after increasing its gross by 168% from the previous week and more than tripling its theatre count (this was the weekend before it was nominated for the Academy Award for Best Picture). Following that week, the film lingered around the top 10 for 8 weeks before peaking at number 4 in its 22nd week (the weekend after winning the Oscar), increasing its weekend gross by 306% and nearly doubling its theatre count from 460 to 877, and spending 6 more weeks in the weekend box office top 10. Were it not for this late push, The Last Emperor would have joined The English Patient, Amadeus, and The Hurt Locker as the only Best Picture winners to not enter the weekend box office top 5 since these numbers were first recorded in 1982.

The film was converted into 3D and shown in the Cannes Classics section at the 2013 Cannes Film Festival.

=== Critical response ===
On Rotten Tomatoes, the film has an approval rating of 86% based on 124 reviews, with an average rating of 8.10/10. The site's critics consensus states: "While Bernardo Bertolucci's decadent epic never quite identifies the dramatic pulse of its protagonist, stupendous visuals and John Lone's ability to make passivity riveting give The Last Emperor a rarified grandeur." Metacritic assigned the film a weighted average score of 76 out of 100 based on 15 critics, indicating "generally favorable reviews". Audiences polled by CinemaScore gave the film an average grade of "A-" on an A+ to F scale.

Roger Ebert was notably enthusiastic in his praise of the film, awarding it four out of four:

"Bertolucci is able to make Pu Yi's imprisonment seem all the more ironic because this entire film was shot on location inside the People's Republic of China, and he was even given permission to film inside the Forbidden City — a vast, medieval complex covering some 250 acres (100 ha) and containing 9,999 rooms (only heaven, the Chinese believed, had 10,000 rooms). It probably is unforgivably bourgeois to admire a film because of its locations, but in the case of The Last Emperor the narrative cannot be separated from the awesome presence of the Forbidden City, and from Bertolucci's astonishing use of locations, authentic costumes, and thousands of extras to create the everyday reality of this strange little boy."

Jonathan Rosenbaum compared The Last Emperor favorably to Steven Spielberg's Empire of the Sun:

"At best, apart from a few snapshots, Empire of the Sun teaches us something about the inside of one director's brain. The Last Emperor incidentally and secondarily does that too; but it also teaches us something about the lives of a billion people with whom we share this planet—and better yet, makes us want to learn still more about them."

=== Editing out of Rape of Nanking scene for Japan ===
The Shochiku Fuji Company edited out a thirty-second sequence depicting the Rape of Nanjing before distributing it to Japanese theatres. Bertolucci had not given his consent for the cut, and was furious at the interference with his film, which he called "revolting". The company quickly restored the scene, blaming "confusion and misunderstanding" for the edit while opining that the Rape sequence was "too sensational" for Japanese moviegoers.

=== Home media ===
Hemdale licensed its video rights to Nelson Entertainment, which released the film on VHS and Laserdisc. The film also received a Laserdisc release in Australia in 1992, through Columbia Tri-Star Video. Years later, Artisan Entertainment acquired the rights to the film and released both the theatrical and extended versions on home video. In February 2008 The Criterion Collection (under license from now-rights-holder Thomas) released a four disc Director-Approved edition, again containing both theatrical and extended versions. Criterion released a Blu-ray version on 6 January 2009.

== Accolades ==
Award	Category	Nominee(s)	Result	Ref.
Academy Awards	Best Picture	Jeremy Thomas	Won	
Academy Awards	Best Director	Bernardo Bertolucci	Won	
Academy Awards	Best Screenplay – Based on Material from Another Medium	Mark Peploe and Bernardo Bertolucci	Won	
Academy Awards	Best Art Direction	Art Direction: Ferdinando Scarfiotti; Set Decoration: Bruno Cesari and Osvaldo Desideri	Won	
Academy Awards	Best Cinematography	Vittorio Storaro	Won	
Academy Awards	Best Costume Design	James Acheson	Won	
Academy Awards	Best Film Editing	Gabriella Cristiani	Won	
Academy Awards	Best Original Score	Ryuichi Sakamoto, David Byrne, and Cong Su	Won	
Academy Awards	Best Sound	Bill Rowe and Ivan Sharrock	Won	
American Cinema Editors Awards	Best Edited Feature Film	Gabriella Cristiani	Won	
American Society of Cinematographers Awards	Outstanding Achievement in Cinematography in Theatrical Releases	Vittorio Storaro	Nominated	
Artios Awards	Best Casting for Feature Film – Drama	Joanna Merlin	Won	
Boston Society of Film Critics Awards	Best Cinematography	Vittorio Storaro	Won	
British Academy Film Awards	Best Film	Jeremy Thomas and Bernardo Bertolucci	Won	
British Academy Film Awards	Best Direction	Bernardo Bertolucci	Nominated	
British Academy Film Awards	Best Actor in a Supporting Role	Peter O'Toole	Nominated	
British Academy Film Awards	Best Cinematography	Vittorio Storaro	Nominated	
British Academy Film Awards	Best Costume Design	James Acheson	Won	
British Academy Film Awards	Best Editing	Gabriella Cristiani	Nominated	
British Academy Film Awards	Best Make-Up Artist	Fabrizio Sforza	Won	
British Academy Film Awards	Best Production Design	Ferdinando Scarfiotti	Nominated	
British Academy Film Awards	Best Score for a Film	Ryuichi Sakamoto, David Byrne, and Cong Su	Nominated	
British Academy Film Awards	Best Sound	Ivan Sharrock, Bill Rowe, and Les Wiggins	Nominated	
British Academy Film Awards	Best Special Effects	Giannetto De Rossi and Fabrizio Martinelli	Nominated	
British Society of Cinematographers Awards	Best Cinematography in a Theatrical Feature Film	Vittorio Storaro	Won	
Cahiers du Cinéma	Best Film	Bernardo Bertolucci	5th Place	
César Awards	Best Foreign Film	Bernardo Bertolucci	Won	
César Awards	Best Poster	Philippe Lemoine	Nominated	
David di Donatello Awards	Best Film		Won	
David di Donatello Awards	Best Director	Bernardo Bertolucci	Won	
David di Donatello Awards	Best Producer	Jeremy Thomas, Franco Giovale, and Joyce Herlihy	Won	
David di Donatello Awards	Best Supporting Actor	Peter O'Toole	Won	
David di Donatello Awards	Best Supporting Actress	Vivian Wu	Nominated	
David di Donatello Awards	Best Screenplay	Mark Peploe and Bernardo Bertolucci	Won	
David di Donatello Awards	Best Cinematography	Vittorio Storaro	Won	
David di Donatello Awards	Best Costume Design	James Acheson and Ugo Pericoli	Won	
David di Donatello Awards	Best Editing	Gabriella Cristiani	Won	
David di Donatello Awards	Best Production Design	Ferdinando Scarfiotti, Bruno Cesari, and Osvaldo Desideri	Won	
Directors Guild of America Awards	Outstanding Directorial Achievement in Motion Pictures	Bernardo Bertolucci	Won	
European Film Awards	Special Jury Award	Bernardo Bertolucci	Won	
Golden Ciak Awards	Best Film	Bernardo Bertolucci	Won	
Golden Ciak Awards	Best Director	Bernardo Bertolucci	Won	
Golden Ciak Awards	Best Screenplay	Mark Peploe and Bernardo Bertolucci	Nominated	
Golden Ciak Awards	Best Cinematography	Vittorio Storaro	Won	
Golden Ciak Awards	Best Production Design	Ferdinando Scarfiotti, Bruno Cesari, and Osvaldo Desideri	Won	
Golden Globe Awards	Best Motion Picture – Drama		Won	
Golden Globe Awards	Best Actor in a Motion Picture – Drama	John Lone	Nominated	
Golden Globe Awards	Best Director – Motion Picture	Bernardo Bertolucci	Won	
Golden Globe Awards	Best Screenplay – Motion Picture	Bernardo Bertolucci, Mark Peploe and Enzo Ungari	Won	
Golden Globe Awards	Best Original Score – Motion Picture	Ryuichi Sakamoto, David Byrne, and Cong Su	Won	
Golden Rooster Awards	Best Property	Yang Guozhi/Cui Tian	Nominated	
Goldene Kamera	Golden Screen		Nominated	
Grammy Awards	Best Album of Original Instrumental Background Score Written for a Motion Picture or Television	The Last Emperor; Ryuichi Sakamoto, David Byrne, and Cong Su	Won	
Hochi Film Awards	Best Foreign Language Film	Bernardo Bertolucci	Won	
Japan Academy Film Prize	Outstanding Foreign Language Film		Won	
Joseph Plateau Awards	Best Foreign Film		Won	
Kinema Junpo Awards	Best Foreign Language Film	Bernardo Bertolucci	Won	
Los Angeles Film Critics Association Awards	Best Film		Runner-up	
Los Angeles Film Critics Association Awards	Best Cinematography	Vittorio Storaro	Won	
Los Angeles Film Critics Association Awards	Best Music	Ryuichi Sakamoto, David Byrne, and Cong Su	Won	
Nastro d'Argento	Best Director	Bernardo Bertolucci	Won	
Nastro d'Argento	Best Cinematography	Vittorio Storaro	Won	
Nastro d'Argento	Best Production Design	Ferdinando Scarfiotti	Won	
Nastro d'Argento	Best Technical Qualities	Gabriella Cristiani	Won	
Nastro d'Argento	Best Male Dubbing	Giuseppe Rinaldi (for dubbing Peter O'Toole)	Won	
National Board of Review Awards (1987)	Top Ten Films		2nd Place	
National Board of Review Awards (1998)	Freedom of Expression	Bernardo Bertolucci	Won	
National Society of Film Critics Awards	Best Film		3rd Place	
New York Film Critics Circle Awards	Best Cinematographer	Vittorio Storaro	Won	
Nikkan Sports Film Awards	Best Foreign Film		Won	
Sant Jordi Awards	Best Foreign Film	Bernardo Bertolucci	Won	
Turkish Film Critics Association Awards	Best Foreign Film		4th Place	
Writers Guild of America Awards	Best Screenplay – Written Directly for the Screen	Mark Peploe and Bernardo Bertolucci	Nominated	

== Alternative versions ==
The film's theatrical release ran 163 minutes. Deemed too long to show in a single three-hour block on television but too short to spread out over two nights, an extended version was created which runs 218 minutes. Cinematographer Vittorio Storaro and director Bernardo Bertolucci have confirmed that this extended version was indeed created as a television miniseries and does not represent a true "director's cut".

== Home video ==
The Criterion Collection 2008 version of four DVDs adds commentary by Ian Buruma, composer Ryuichi Sakamoto, and the Director's interview with Jeremy Isaacs (ISBN 978-1-60465-014-3). It includes a booklet featuring an essay by David Thomson, interviews with production designer Ferdinando Scarfiotti and actor Ying Ruocheng, a reminiscence by Bertolucci, and an essay and production-diary extracts from Fabien S. Gerard.

The film was for quite some time unavailable on DVD or Blu-Ray in its original 2.35:1 aspect ratio, as cinematographer Vittorio Storaro had insisted on a cropped 2:1 version that retroactively conforms the film to his Univisium standard. Copies of the film in its original ratio were then rare and sought after by fans of the film.

The film has since been restored in 4K and in its original 2.35:1 aspect ratio, and has been released on Blu-ray and UHD in 2023 in several countries using this 4K restoration.

== See also ==
- Big Shot's Funeral, a film with a plot that involves a fictional remake of The Last Emperor
- List of historical drama films set in Asia
