= From Emperor to Citizen =

Autobiography of Puyi, the last emperor of China

From Emperor to Citizen: The Autobiography of Aisin-Gioro Pu Yi
- Author: Puyi; Pujie (ghostwriter); Li Wenda (ghostwriter)
- Original title: 我的前半生
- Translator: William John Francis Jenner
- Language: Chinese
- Genre: Autobiography
- Publisher: Xinhua Bookstore
- Publication date: January, 1964
- Pages: 512
- ISBN: 978-0192820990

From Emperor to Citizen: The Autobiography of Aisin-Gioro Pu Yi (Chinese: 我的前半生, literally translated as The First Half of My Life), also titled The Last Manchu, is the autobiography of Puyi, credited both as Aisin-Gioro Pu Yi and Henry Pu Yi in English, the last emperor of China. The Bernardo Bertolucci film The Last Emperor is based on this book.

As of 2007, the book had sold over two million copies in China.

== History ==
In the late 1950s, while Puyi lived in Fushun War Criminals Management Centre, following the end of the Chinese Civil War, he began working on an autobiography, assisted by Pujie, his little brother. This version of the autobiography ended in 1957.

In 1959, a mimeographed copy of the book was sent to the Ministry of Public Security, and in January 1960, an edited version of the draft was published by Xinhua Bookstore. This first edition was released in two volumes.

Following the release of the first edition, Li Wenda (Chinese: 李文達), an editor, was contacted to compile the rest of the material into a second edition. In July and August 1960, Li began to do in-person research, such as visiting the Fushun War Criminals Management Centre and other places Puyi had lived. In doing so, he corrected historical errors that were present in the draft.

On August 15, 1961, several editorial board members of Xinhua held a meeting regarding the second edition of From Emperor to Citizen. During this meeting, Li outlined themes and planned revisions for the second edition. Following this, he worked closely with Puyi to finish the edition. The first draft was completed in early 1962. Later drafts included revisions based on consultation from Qing history experts. It was also alleged that Lao She contributed to the draft. This edition was eventually published in 1964.

In March 2004, the original draft, written by Puyi and Pujie, was rediscovered. A third edition, which included the rediscovered material, was published in 2007.

=== Legal conflict ===
As Li was primarily an editor, he was not credited on the second edition. However, in 1987, Li Shuxian, Puyi's wife at the time of his death, sued Li for control of the copyright of this edition. In 1989, the Beijing Intermediate People's Court, along with the Supreme People's Court, ruled in favor of Li, saying that due to him contributing significantly to the book, the copyright would be shared between him and Puyi. They also ruled that the 1960 first edition counted as an entirely different book for copyright purposes, due to the degree of differences between it and the second edition.

=== Banning ===
In 1968, From Emperor to Citizen was denounced by an anonymous pamphlet published in Guangzhou. This pamphlet denounced the book as supporting imperialism and vilifying Chinese communists. Later, in 1974, during the Cultural Revolution, the book was formally banned. Following the end of the Cultural Revolution, the book was unbanned.

=== Translation ===
From Emperor to Citizen was translated by William John Francis Jenner. The translation was based on the 1964 second edition. The translation was originally published in two volumes, in 1964 and 1965. It was later re-released as one volume in 1987. A second translation, edited by Paul Kramer, was published in 1965. Work on the second translation began before the Jenner version was published.

== Adaptation ==
In 1987, From Emperor to Citizen was adapted into film as The Last Emperor.
