= 1987 New York Film Critics Circle Awards =

53rd New York Film Critics Circle Awards

53rd New York Film Critics Circle Awards

January 24, 1988

Best Film:
Broadcast News

The 53rd New York Film Critics Circle Awards honored the best filmmaking of 1987. The winners were announced on 17 December 1987 and the awards were given on 24 January 1988.

== Winners ==
- Best Actor:
  - Jack Nicholson - The Witches of Eastwick, Ironweed and Broadcast News
  - Runners-up: Michael Douglas - Wall Street and William Hurt - Broadcast News
- Best Actress:
  - Holly Hunter - Broadcast News
  - Runners-up: Christine Lahti - Housekeeping and Maggie Smith - The Lonely Passion of Judith Hearne
- Best Cinematography:
  - Vittorio Storaro - The Last Emperor
- Best Director:
  - James L. Brooks - Broadcast News
  - Runner-up: John Huston - The Dead
- Best Film:
  - Broadcast News
  - Runners-up: The Dead and Hope and Glory
- Best Foreign Language Film:
  - My Life as a Dog (Mitt liv som hund) • Sweden
- Best Screenplay:
  - James L. Brooks - Broadcast News
  - Runner-up: Tony Huston - The Dead
- Best Supporting Actor:
  - Morgan Freeman - Street Smart
  - Runner-up: Sean Connery - The Untouchables
- Best Supporting Actress:
  - Vanessa Redgrave - Prick Up Your Ears
  - Runners-up: Anjelica Huston - The Dead and Olympia Dukakis - Moonstruck
