= Boston Society of Film Critics Awards 1987 =

Annual US film awards ceremony

8th BSFC Awards

January 10, 1988

Best Film:
Hope and Glory

The 8th Boston Society of Film Critics Awards honored the best filmmaking of 1987. The awards were given on 10 January 1988.

== Winners ==
- Best Film:
  - Hope and Glory
- Best Actor:
  - Albert Brooks – Broadcast News
- Best Actress:
  - Holly Hunter – Broadcast News
- Best Supporting Actor:
  - R. Lee Ermey – Full Metal Jacket
- Best Supporting Actress:
  - Kathy Baker – Street Smart
- Best Director:
  - Stanley Kubrick – Full Metal Jacket
- Best Screenplay:
  - James L. Brooks – Broadcast News
- Best Cinematography:
  - Vittorio Storaro – The Last Emperor
- Best Documentary:
  - Marlene
- Best Foreign-Language Film:
  - My Life as a Dog (Mitt liv som hund) • Sweden
