= National Board of Review Awards 1987 =

Annual US film awards ceremony

59th National Board of Review Awards

Best Picture:
Empire of the Sun

The 59th National Board of Review Awards were announced on December 15, 1987, and given on 16 February, 1988.

== Top 10 films ==
1. Empire of the Sun
2. The Last Emperor
3. Broadcast News
4. The Untouchables
5. Gaby: A True Story
6. Cry Freedom
7. Fatal Attraction
8. Hope and Glory
9. Wall Street
10. Full Metal Jacket

== Top Foreign Films ==
1. Jean de Florette and Manon des Sources
2. My Life as a Dog
3. Au revoir les enfants
4. Tampopo
5. Dark Eyes

== Winners ==
- Best Picture:
  - Empire of the Sun
- Best Foreign Language Film (tie):
  - Jean de Florette, France
  - Manon des sources (Manon of the Spring), France
- Best Actor:
  - Michael Douglas - Wall Street
- Best Actress (tie):
  - Lillian Gish - The Whales of August
  - Holly Hunter - Broadcast News
- Best Supporting Actor:
  - Sean Connery - The Untouchables
- Best Supporting Actress:
  - Olympia Dukakis - Moonstruck
- Best Director:
  - Steven Spielberg - Empire of the Sun
- Best Performance by a Juvenile Actor (special citation)
  - Christian Bale - Empire of the Sun
- Best Documentary:
  - Chuck Berry Hail! Hail! Rock 'n' Roll
- Career Achievement Award:
  - Lillian Gish
