= Joanne Woollard =

British art director

- Died: 27 February 2015
- Occupation: Art director
- Years active: 1985-2013

Joanne Woollard (died 27 February 2015) was a British art director. She was nominated for an Academy Award in the category Best Art Direction for the film Hope and Glory. She got her 2nd nomination in 2013 for Gravity.

== Selected filmography ==
- Hope and Glory (1987)
- Gravity (2013)
