= Bruno Cesari =

Italian art director

- Born: 24 October 1933; Pesaro, Italy
- Died: 30 January 2004 (aged 70); Pesaro, Italy
- Occupation: Art director
- Years active: 1963–2000

Bruno Cesari (24 October 1933 – 30 January 2004) was an Italian art director. He won an Academy Award in the category Best Art Direction for the film The Last Emperor.

He received his second Oscar nomination at the 2000 Academy Awards for his work on the film The Talented Mr. Ripley, which he shared with Roy Walker.

== Selected filmography ==
- The Last Emperor (1987)
- The Talented Mr. Ripley (1999)
