= Robert Wald (sound engineer) =

American sound engineer (born 1948)

Robert Allan Wald
- Occupation: Sound engineer
- Years active: 1976–2013

Robert Allan Wald (/ˈwɔːld/) is an American sound engineer.

Wald is a Texas native and attended Southern Methodist University in Dallas. During his studies he visited a class for Introduction to Motion Picture and Television Production. He graduated with a Bachelor of Fine Arts.

Wald was nominated for an Academy Award in the category Best Sound for the film RoboCop. He has had nearly 50 film and television credits since his start in 1976. He retired in 2013.

Wald is married to costume supervisor Suzanne Cranfill since 2000. He is a pilot and is committed to environmental protection.

== Selected filmography ==
- Lone Wolf McQuade (1983)
- Flight of the Navigator (1986)
- RoboCop (1987)
- Wired (1989)
- Problem Child (1990)
