= Broadcast News (film) =

1987 American film by James L. Brooks

- Theatrical release poster
- Directed by: James L. Brooks
- Written by: James L. Brooks
- Produced by: James L. Brooks
- Starring: William Hurt; Albert Brooks; Holly Hunter
- Cinematography: Michael Ballhaus
- Edited by: Richard Marks
- Music by: Bill Conti
- Production company: Gracie Films
- Distributed by: 20th Century Fox
- Release dates: December 16, 1987 (limited); December 25, 1987 (wide)
- Running time: 133 minutes
- Country: United States
- Language: English
- Budget: $15 million
- Box office: $67.3 million

Broadcast News is a 1987 American romantic comedy-drama film written, produced and directed by James L. Brooks. The film concerns a virtuoso television news producer (Holly Hunter), a reporter (Albert Brooks), and an anchorman (William Hurt). It also stars Robert Prosky, Lois Chiles, Joan Cusack, and Jack Nicholson. The film was produced by Gracie Films and distributed by 20th Century Fox.

The film was acclaimed by critics and at the 60th Academy Awards received seven nominations, including Best Picture. In 2018, the film was selected for preservation in the United States National Film Registry by the Library of Congress as being "culturally, historically, or aesthetically significant.".

== Plot ==
Jane Craig is a news producer who is passionate about reporting and abhors the trend towards soft news in broadcasts. Her best friend and collaborator, Aaron Altman, is a writer and reporter lacking in social skills. The two work in the Washington, D.C. bureau of a national TV network. The bureau hires Tom Grunick, a local news anchor who is handsome, likable, and telegenic but lacks news experience and isn't especially bright.

Aaron and Jane go to Nicaragua to report on the Contras and get caught up in a shooting battle between them and the Sandinista rebels, bringing home footage that wins the approval of their national anchor. At an office party, news arrives of a Libyan plane having bombed a U.S. military base in Italy. The network chief decides to air a special report, with Tom as anchor and Jane as executive producer. Aaron is devastated at Tom's selection. Watching from his home, he calls Jane with pertinent information, which she feeds to Tom through his earpiece. With the combination of Tom's on-camera poise and Jane's hard-news skills, the report is a great success. Their teamwork also intensifies their mutual attraction.

Wanting to complete a story without outside assistance, Tom creates a piece on date rape that includes an interview with a rape victim, where Tom is shown tearing up in reaction. In the face of potential layoffs, Aaron receives an opportunity to anchor the weekend news due to most of his colleagues going to the White House Correspondents' Dinner. He seeks advice from Tom, who encourages Aaron to be more salesman-like in his approach. Aaron takes Tom's advice but during the broadcast begins sweating uncontrollably, resulting in a disastrous broadcast. Meanwhile, Jane and Tom progress romantically at the White House Correspondents' Dinner. But before things get more involved, Jane leaves to console Aaron. The two have a heated argument, where Aaron tells Jane that Tom represents everything she hates about the direction of news media. He also tells Jane that he is in love with her.

The layoffs hit the network, resulting in many colleagues losing their jobs. Tom is moved to the London office, indicating that he is being groomed for a national anchor position; Jane is promoted to bureau chief. Tom and Jane agree to take a romantic getaway together before starting their new jobs. Aaron tells Jane he plans to take a job at a television station in Portland, Oregon. Before he leaves, Aaron tells Jane that Tom's tears during his date-rape piece were staged; reviewing the footage, Jane realizes that he is correct. Jane confronts Tom at the airport, arguing that his actions were a breach of journalistic ethics and that she cannot in good conscience become involved with him. Tom rebuffs these claims but relents, leaving a devastated Jane behind.

Seven years later, the trio meet again; Tom has taken over as national anchor, Aaron has a wife and child, and Jane has a new boyfriend. Jane plans to take a managing editor role for the network in New York, working with Tom again. Tom leaves after Jane declines a dinner invitation with him and his fiancée, while she and Aaron catch up on their respective lives.

== Cast ==
- William Hurt as Tom Grunick
  - Kimber Shoop as young Tom Grunick
- Albert Brooks as Aaron Altman
  - Dwayne Markee as young Aaron Altman
- Holly Hunter as Jane Craig
  - Gennie James as young Jane Craig
- Robert Prosky as Ernie Merriman
- Lois Chiles as Jennifer Mack
- Joan Cusack as Blair Litton (credited as Joan Cusak)
- Peter Hackes as Paul Moore
- Christian Clemenson as Bobby
- Jack Nicholson as Bill Rorish
- Leo Burmester as Mr. Craig
- Marita Geraghty as Date-Rape Woman
- Glen Roven as News Theme Writer
- Marc Shaiman as News Theme Writer
- John Cusack as Angry Messenger
- Stephen Mendillo as Gerald Grunick

== Production ==
The score was by Bill Conti. Emmy Award-winning composers Glen Roven and Marc Shaiman make cameo appearances as a dorky musician team who have composed a theme for the news program in the film.

The character of Jane Craig was based on journalist and news producer Susan Zirinsky. She served as associate producer and technical advisor for the film. The female lead was originally written for Debra Winger, who worked with James L. Brooks in Terms of Endearment. However, Winger became pregnant and was replaced by Holly Hunter just two days before filming began. Sigourney Weaver, Dianne Wiest, Jessica Lange, Elizabeth Perkins, and Mary Beth Hurt were also considered for the role. Brooks originally wrote the role of Aaron Altman specifically for his longtime friend Albert Brooks in mind. Principal photography began in Washington, D.C. on February 2, 1987, officially wrapping in April 1987 after filming several scenes in Florida.

== Reception ==
=== Box office ===
Broadcast News was given a limited release on December 16, 1987, in seven theaters and managed to gross US$197,542 on its opening weekend. It went into wide release in the United States on Christmas Day, 1987, in 677 theaters, grossing US$5.5 million on its opening weekend. The film went on to make US$51.3 million in North America and US$16.1 million in the rest of the world for a worldwide total of US$67.3 million.

=== Critical response ===
Film critic Roger Ebert of the Chicago Sun-Times gave Broadcast News four out of four stars and praised the film for being as "knowledgeable about the TV news-gathering process as any movie ever made, but it also has insights into the more personal matter of how people use high-pressure jobs as a way of avoiding time alone with themselves". In his review for The New York Times, Vincent Canby wrote, "As the fast-talking Aaron, Albert Brooks comes very close to stealing Broadcast News. Mr. Brooks ... is more or less the conscience of Broadcast News". Jonathan Rosenbaum, in his review for the Chicago Reader, praised Holly Hunter's performance as "something of a revelation: her short, feisty, socially gauche, aggressive-compulsive character may be the most intricately layered portrait of a career woman that contemporary Hollywood has given us".

Hal Hinson, in his review for The Washington Post, wrote, "[James] Brooks is excellent at taking us inside the world of television, but not terribly good at analyzing it. He has a facile, too-pat approach to dealing with issues; there's still too much of the sitcom mentality at work". In his review for Time, Richard Corliss praised William Hurt's performance: "Hurt is neat too, never standing safely outside his character, always allowing Tom to find the humor in his too-rapid success, locating a dimness behind his eyes when Tom is asked a tough question -- and for Tom, poor soulless sensation-to-be, all questions are tough ones". The magazine also ranked Broadcast News as one of the best films of the year. The film garnered a 98% rating at Rotten Tomatoes from 59 critics. The site's consensus states: "Blockbuster dramatist James L. Brooks delivers with Broadcast News, fully entertaining with deft, deep characterization." The film has an 84% average score at Metacritic, based on 16 reviews, indicating "universal acclaim".

Broadcast News was placed on 61 "ten-best" lists, making it the most acclaimed film of 1987.

The February 2020 issue of New York Magazine lists Broadcast News as among "The Best Movies That Lost Best Picture at the Oscars."

== Accolades ==
Award	Category	Nominee(s)	Result
Academy Awards	Best Picture	James L. Brooks	Nominated
Academy Awards	Best Actor	William Hurt	Nominated
Academy Awards	Best Actress	Holly Hunter	Nominated
Academy Awards	Best Supporting Actor	Albert Brooks	Nominated
Academy Awards	Best Original Screenplay	James L. Brooks	Nominated
Academy Awards	Best Cinematography	Michael Ballhaus	Nominated
Academy Awards	Best Film Editing	Richard Marks	Nominated
American Cinema Editors Awards	Best Edited Feature Film	Richard Marks	Nominated
American Comedy Awards	Funniest Actress in a Motion Picture (Leading Role)	Holly Hunter	Nominated
American Comedy Awards	Funniest Supporting Male Performer – Motion Picture or TV	Albert Brooks	Won
Artios Awards	Outstanding Achievement in Feature Film Casting – Comedy	Ellen Chenoweth	Nominated
Berlin International Film Festival	Golden Bear	James L. Brooks	Nominated
Berlin International Film Festival	Best Actress	Holly Hunter	Won
Boston Society of Film Critics Awards	Best Actor	Albert Brooks	Won
Boston Society of Film Critics Awards	Best Actress	Holly Hunter	Won
Boston Society of Film Critics Awards	Best Screenplay	James L. Brooks	Won
Directors Guild of America Awards	Outstanding Directorial Achievement in Motion Pictures	James L. Brooks	Nominated
Golden Globe Awards	Best Motion Picture – Musical or Comedy		Nominated
Golden Globe Awards	Best Actor in a Motion Picture – Musical or Comedy	William Hurt	Nominated
Golden Globe Awards	Best Actress in a Motion Picture – Musical or Comedy	Holly Hunter	Nominated
Golden Globe Awards	Best Director – Motion Picture	James L. Brooks	Nominated
Golden Globe Awards	Best Screenplay – Motion Picture	James L. Brooks	Nominated
Los Angeles Film Critics Association Awards	Best Director	James L. Brooks	Nominated
Los Angeles Film Critics Association Awards	Best Actress	Holly Hunter	Won (Note: Tied with Sally Kirkland for Anna.)
National Board of Review Awards	Top Ten Films		3rd Place
National Board of Review Awards	Best Actress	Holly Hunter	Won (Note: Tied with Lillian Gish for The Whales of August.)
National Film Preservation Board	National Film Registry		Inducted
National Society of Film Critics Awards	Best Actor	Albert Brooks	2nd Place
National Society of Film Critics Awards	Best Actress	Holly Hunter	3rd Place
National Society of Film Critics Awards	Best Supporting Actor	Albert Brooks	3rd Place
New York Film Critics Circle Awards	Best Film		Won
New York Film Critics Circle Awards	Best Director	James L. Brooks	Won
New York Film Critics Circle Awards	Best Actor	William Hurt	Nominated
New York Film Critics Circle Awards	Best Actor	Jack Nicholson	Won
New York Film Critics Circle Awards	Best Actress	Holly Hunter	Won
New York Film Critics Circle Awards	Best Screenplay	James L. Brooks	Won
Writers Guild of America Awards	Best Screenplay – Written Directly for the Screen	James L. Brooks	Nominated

Also, the film is recognized by American Film Institute in these lists:

- 1998: AFI's 100 Years...100 Movies – Nominated
- 2000: AFI's 100 Years...100 Laughs – #64
- 2005: AFI's 100 Years...100 Movie Quotes:
  - Aaron Altman: "I'll meet you at the place near the thing where we went that time." – Nominated
- 2007: AFI's 100 Years...100 Movies (10th Anniversary Edition) – Nominated

In 2006, Writers Guild of America West ranked the film's screenplay 51st in WGA’s list of 101 Greatest Screenplays.

== Home media ==
A digitally restored version of the film was released on DVD and Blu-ray by The Criterion Collection. The release includes new audio commentary featuring Brooks and Marks, James L. Brooks—A Singular Voice, a documentary on Brooks's career in television and film, an alternative ending and deleted scenes with commentary by Brooks, an interview with veteran CBS news producer Susan Zirinsky, and a featurette containing on-set footage and interviews with Brooks, Hunter, and actor Albert Brooks. There is also a booklet featuring an essay by film critic Carrie Rickey.
