= Not Yet, He Ain't =

- Batman episode
- Episode no.: Season 1 Episode 22
- Directed by: Leslie H. Martinson
- Written by: Lorenzo Semple Jr. and John Cardwell
- Production code: 8723-Pt. 2
- Original air date: March 24, 1966

Guest appearances
- Kathleen Crowley; Al Checco; Harvey Lembeck; Burgess Meredith as The Penguin

Episode chronology
← Previous "The Penguin Goes Straight"	Next → "The Ring of Wax"

"Not Yet, He Ain't" is an episode of the 1960s Batman television series, first airing on ABC March 24, 1966. It was the 22nd episode in the series. It guest starred Burgess Meredith as the villain The Penguin.

== Plot ==
Picking up from the last episode Batman and Robin avoid Commissioner Gordon and Chief O'Hara’s bullets by deflecting them with the bullet-proof soles of their boots; in the confusion, Batman cuts himself and his adoptive son free using his Batknife, and they make their escape. Furious and humiliated that the Dynamic Duo have escaped from his trap, the Penguin persuades his new society friends to make Commissioner Gordon rally a manhunt for Batman and Robin.

The Dynamic Duo arrive at the Penguin Protection Agency, pretending to be insane and about to tear Penguin and his henchmen, Eagle-Eye and Dove, to pieces. A fight breaks out, but then the police arrive and pursue the two crime fighters out of the building and into the street; the chase ends in a shootout in a nearby alley, in which Batman and Robin are apparently killed.

The Penguin is unaware that this is merely a ruse, as it is later revealed that Batman had arranged for the policemen’s guns to be loaded with blanks; the Penguin and his henchmen steal the Batmobile and then speed off to plan their master plan, involving the Penguin’s marriage to Sophia Starr and the theft of his own wedding gifts.

To that end, The Penguin and his minions create a disturbance at the wedding, and then secretly dump all the wedding gifts into the Batmobile's trunk in the confusion. Making his escape with the excuse of pursuing the thieves, the Penguin is unaware that the Dynamic Duo is observing him through the Batmobile's internal surveillance equipment and follow him in the Batcycle. Using his remote control of the Batmobile, Batman ejects Penguin's henchmen for capture and then takes over the car's navigation to maneuver it back to them to take care of the Penguin as well.

Afterward, Sophia Starr comes to police headquarters and vows to marry and reform the Penguin. The Penguin is brought in and upon learning of Starr's intentions, he furiously rejects her and demands to be returned to his cell.

== Trivia ==
- This was the only time that the first Batcycle (a barely modified 1965 Harley Davidson) was used on the show, as it was taken on lease. The rest of the time that the Batcycle was used on the show, it was the Yamaha Catalina from the 1966 film, but in stock footage from the film with new filmed shots cut in.
- The alleyway that Batman and Robin are hiding in on the Batcycle would later become the exit for Batgirl's Batcycle in Season 3 of the show.
- This episode's director, Leslie H. Martinson, would go on to direct the 1966 Batman movie.
