= Anne Ramsey =

American actress (1929–1988)

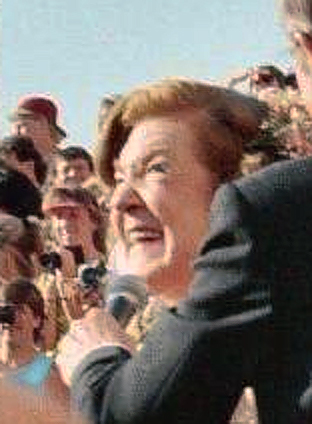
- Ramsey at the 60th Academy Awards, in 1988, four months before her death
- Born: March 27, 1929; Omaha, Nebraska, U.S.
- Died: August 11, 1988 (aged 59); Los Angeles, California, U.S.
- Occupation: Actress
- Years active: 1952–1988
- Spouse: Logan Ramsey (m. 1954)

Anne Ramsey-Mobley (March 27, 1929 – August 11, 1988) was an American actress. She was best known for her film roles as Mama Fratelli in The Goonies (1985) and as Edna in Homer & Eddie (1989) and as Mrs. Lift in Throw Momma from the Train (1987), the latter of which earned her nominations for an Academy Award and a Golden Globe Award. Additionally, Ramsey's respective turns in both aforementioned films earned her two Saturn Awards.

== Early life and education ==
Ramsey was born in Omaha, Nebraska, the daughter of Eleanor (née Smith), the former national treasurer of the Girl Scouts of the USA, and Nathan Mobley, an insurance executive. Her mother was a descendant of the Pilgrims (William Brewster), and her uncle was U.S. Ambassador David S. Smith. Ramsey was raised in Great Neck, New York and Greenwich, Connecticut. Ramsey attended prestigious Rosemary Hall in Greenwich and matriculated to Bennington College, where she became interested in theatre. Ramsey performed in several Broadway productions in the 1950s and married actor Logan Ramsey in 1954. They moved to Philadelphia, where they formed the Theatre of the Living Arts in 1959.

== Career ==
In the 1970s, Ramsey began a successful Hollywood career in character roles and appeared in such television programs as Little House on the Prairie, Wonder Woman, Three's Company and Ironside. She appeared with her husband in seven films, including her first, The Sporting Club (1971), and her last, Meet the Hollowheads (1989).

In 1988, Ramsey was nominated for the Academy Award for Best Supporting Actress and the Golden Globe Award for Best Supporting Actress – Motion Picture for her performance in Throw Momma from the Train (1987), with Billy Crystal and Danny DeVito. The film also earned her a second Saturn Award for Best Supporting Actress; she had received her first for The Goonies (1985). In February 1988, aged 58, Ramsey guest-starred on an episode of ALF broadcast six months before her death. She had a cameo part in Scrooged shortly before her death. Six further films in which Ramsey appeared were released in the two years following her death.

== Death ==
Ramsey's somewhat slurred speech, a trademark of her later performances, was caused in part from having had some of her tongue and her jaw removed during surgery for esophageal cancer in 1984.

In 1988, Ramsey's cancer returned. She died on August 11 at the Motion Picture & Television Country House and Hospital in Woodland Hills, Los Angeles, California; she was 59 years old. Ramsey is buried at Forest Lawn Cemetery in North Omaha, Nebraska. Her grave was unmarked.

== Filmography ==
=== Film ===
Year	Title	Role	Notes
1971	The Sporting Club	Scott's wife	
1972	The New Centurions	Wife of crazy man	Uncredited
1972	Up the Sandbox	Battleaxe	
1973	The Third Girl from the Left	Madelaine	Television movie
1974	Rhinoceros	Woman with cat	
1974	For Pete's Sake	Telephone lady	
1974	The Law	Eleanor Bleisch	Television movie
1976	From Noon till Three	Massive woman	
1976	Dawn: Portrait of a Teenage Runaway	Librarian	Television movie
1976	The Boy in the Plastic Bubble	Rachel	Television movie
1977	Fun with Dick and Jane	Employment Applicant	
1978	Goin' South	Spinster #2	
1978	The Gift of Love	Maeve O'Hollaran	Television movie
1979	When You Comin' Back, Red Ryder?	Rhea Childress	
1980	White Mama	Heavy Charm	Television movie
1980	The Black Marble	Bessie Callahan	
1980	Any Which Way You Can	Loretta Quince	
1981	Honky Tonk Freeway	TV Chef	Uncredited
1981	A Small Killing	Doris	Television movie
1982	Marian Rose White	Teacher	
1982	National Lampoon's Class Reunion	Mrs. Tabazooski	
1983	I Want to Live!	Matron	Television movie
1983	Herndon	Miss Helter	Television movie
1984	The Seduction of Gina	Woman on bus	Television movie
1984	Getting Physical	Lady at Police Station	Television movie
1984	The Killers	First Ragpicker	
1985	The Goonies	Mama Fratelli	Saturn Award for Best Supporting Actress
1986	Say Yes	Major	
1986	Deadly Friend	Elvira Parker	
1987	Love at Stake	Old Witch	
1987	Weeds	Mom Umstetter	
1987	Throw Momma from the Train	Momma	Saturn Award for Best Supporting Actress; Nominated—Academy Award for Best Supporting Actress; Nominated—Golden Globe Award for Best Supporting Actress – Motion Picture
1988	Dr. Hackenstein	Ruby Rhodes	
1988	Good Old Boy: A Delta Boyhood	The Hag	Television movie Also known as The River Pirates; Released posthumously
1988	Scrooged	Woman in shelter	Released posthumously
1989	Meet the Hollowheads	Babbleaxe	Released posthumously
1989	Another Chance	Leadlady	Released posthumously
1989	Homer and Eddie	Edna	Released posthumously

=== Television ===
Year	Title	Role	Note
1972	Ironside	Motel Manager	Episode: "Riddle Me Death"
1972	Banyon	Mrs. Hendricks	Episode: "Just Once"
1973	Columbo	Masseuse	Episode: "Lovely But Lethal"
1975	Wonder Woman	Taxi Cab Driver	Episode: "The New Original Wonder Woman"
1976	Starsky and Hutch	Evon/Gertrude	Episode: "Birds of a feather"
1976	Mary Hartman, Mary Hartman	Sister Bernadette	Episode: "1.24"
1976	Delvecchio	Mrs. Bellows	Episode: "The Silent Prey"
1976	Charlie's Angels	Henry's wife	Episode: "Hellride"
1977	Wonder Woman	Connie	Episode: "Mind Stealers from Outer Space: Part 1"
1978	Little House on the Prairie	Mrs. Schiller	Episode: "As Long As We're Together: Part 1"
1978	ABC Afterschool Specials	Nurse	Episode: "A Home Run for Love"
1979	Laverne & Shirley	Lady	Episode: "Fire Show"
1979	CHiPs	Nurse Betty Jo	Episode: "Hot Wheels"
1982	Cassie & Co.	Bertha Crabbe	Episodes: "Man Overboard," "Lover Come Back"
1982	Laverne & Shirley	Killer	Episode: "Death Row: Part 2"
1983	Three's Company	Woman at ATM	Episode: "The Money Machine"
1984	Murder, She Wrote	Bag Lady	Episode: "The Murder of Sherlock Holmes"
1984	Family Ties	Mrs. Warfield	Episode: "Help Wanted"
1985	Hill Street Blues	Mrs. Scalisi	Episode: "Blues in the Night"
1985	Night Court	Edna Sneer	Episode: "Halloween, Too"
1986	Knight Rider	Crossing Guard	Episode: "Killer K.I.T.T."
1988	ALF	Ethel Buttonwood	Episode: "You Ain't Nothin' but a Hound Dog"

== Awards and nominations ==
Year	Award	Category	Nominated work	Result
1986	Saturn Awards	Best Supporting Actress	The Goonies	Won
1988	Academy Awards	Best Supporting Actress	Throw Momma From the Train	Nominated
1988	Golden Globe Awards	Best Supporting Actress	Throw Momma From the Train	Nominated
1988	Saturn Awards	Best Supporting Actress	Throw Momma From the Train	Won
