= Siobhan Donovan =

Siobhan Donovan is the name of:

- Siobhan Hathaway, later Donovan, fictional character in BBC radio soap The Archers
- Siobhan Donovan, fictional character played by Alison Doody in 1987 film A Prayer for the Dying
