= The Sporting Club (film) =

- Theatrical release poster
- Directed by: Larry Peerce
- Screenplay by: Lorenzo Semple Jr.
- Based on: The Sporting Club by Thomas McGuane
- Produced by: Lee Rich
- Starring: Robert Fields; Nicolas Coster; Maggie Blye; Jack Warden; Richard Dysart; William Roerick
- Cinematography: Jack Courtland
- Edited by: Lawrence Silk
- Music by: Michael Small
- Production company: Lorimar Productions
- Distributed by: Avco Embassy Pictures
- Release date: February 28, 1971
- Running time: 107 minutes
- Country: United States
- Language: English

The Sporting Club is a 1971 American comedy film directed by Larry Peerce and written by Lorenzo Semple Jr. It is based the 1968 novel The Sporting Club by Thomas McGuane. The film stars Robert Fields, Nicolas Coster, Maggie Blye, Jack Warden, Richard Dysart and William Roerick. The film was released on February 28, 1971, by Avco Embassy Pictures.

== Plot ==
James Quinn, depressed over the sale of his family business to a larger competitor, retreats to The Centennial Club, a summer sporting resort for upper-class Michigan families, which his family has belonged to for generations. Upon arriving, he is told by longtime club manager Jack Olson that James’s former Harvard roommate, Vernor Stanton, another legacy member, is in residence with a new wife, and that this weekend will bring the large Centennial Day celebration, where several club members will converge to open a century-old time capsule buried by their ancestors.

When Jack tells James that Vernor wants to fire him, James checks in on him, finding his old friend behaving in a troubling manner, particularly regarding his new basement shooting range. When Vernor challenges James to a duel, James is injured, discovering that the pistols contain wax bullets. Vernor’s companion Janey comes upon them, bewildered at their behavior. Later, Vernor complains to her about his dislike of the older members’ attitudes, but states he intends to stay because quitting “is no way to resign from original sin.”

During a parade the next day involving a politician’s visit, the threesome sneak onto a bus commissioned for Centennial Day visitors, and ransack all the food and liquor. When the proper passengers attempt to board it, Vernor locks them out and tells James to drive off, then moons the assembled multitude.

In the evening, the Centennial Club revelers arrive, led by Canon Pritchard, Senator Olds, historian Spengler, elderly Newcombe and snooty Fortesque. Vernor spreads a rumor among the prime members that Jack has been poaching in the off season, to seek their support for his ouster. James comes upon Janey sunbathing naked, which Vernor learns of and playfully but menacingly teases James later, acknowledging they are both attracted to her. That night, as the outwardly upright members get drunk and impudent, Janey confides in James that she and Vernor are not actually married.

James learns that Vernor fired Jack the previous night, but upon criticizing him, Vernor replies that he has provided the former caretaker a generous severance. Soon after, Earl Olive, a coarse local, appears at the lodge claiming that Jack hired him as his replacement. After their initial revulsion, the members agree to keep Earl on, the better to concentrate on their pending anniversary.

Earl shortly after throws a rowdy barbecue with bikers and other locals at his cottage near the compound. The club members are drawn by the noise, and flee upon seeing their behavior, but Vernor, Janey and James enjoy themselves. Vernor, who reveals hiring Earl was his idea, coerces the new caretaker to come to his shooting gallery. Vernor and Earl duel, and Earl takes a rubber bullet to the mouth and his chest, and though shaken and bloody, furious walks out.

The next morning, in retaliation, Earl blows up a dam, almost drowning James as he is fishing. The men of the Club gather their guns to find Earl. James sees the mob and grows worried, but Vernor chooses not to intervene, morbidly amused at their “hunting.” While the men are away, their wives are caught by Earl, brandishing dynamite, who sends them outside. Spengler and his team are quickly overwhelmed by the now-muddy river, and as they struggle, they witness the century-old lodge, other structures, and even their flagpole, blown up.

Though horrified by the demolition, Fortesque rallies them to put order to the grounds and prove they possess the values of their ancestors. He then visits Vernor, declaring his intention to catch and “interrogate” Earl. Vernor challenges Fortesque’s plan by aiming a gun at him, but Spengler bursts in the back door and disarms him. They leave and shoot at his lodge to assert their domination. James warns Earl that the Club has a machine gun and that his group is in danger, but Earl is defiant.

Earl’s friends abduct club member Russell, and the old man returns to the compound tarred and feathered. Vernor returns to Earl, throwing him $20,000 and telling everyone to leave. Earl gleefully agrees to go and take the bikers away. Vernor then tells the militarized older members that Earl is gone but they refuse to believe him, so he takes to the woods worried about the escalation.

As midnight arrives to mark Centennial Day, the club members, crowing about their ancestors and survival and tradition, finally unearth the time capsule. Inside is a large photograph, once unfolded, depicts their Club founders engaged in an orgy. All sense of propriety and history shattered, the members rip off their clothes and have group sex.

Vernor returns with the Club’s machine gun, aiming it at the tent where they are fornicating, and demands to know whether James will stand with him in gunning them down, or join their decadent behavior. He then challenges James to duel him. Expecting wax bullets again, James participates, but when he shoots Vernor, he learns his gun had actual bullets; Vernor collapses and dies. James and Janey stand dumbstruck as a helicopter arrives, unprepared for what is taking place among the Centennial Club members.

== Cast ==
- Robert Fields as Vernur Stanton
- Nicolas Coster as James Quinn
- Maggie Blye as Janey
- Jack Warden as Earl Olive
- Richard Dysart as Spengler
- William Roerick as Fortesque
- Logan Ramsey as Scott
- Leon B. Stevens as Olds
- John Seymour as Newcombe
- Helen Craig as Mrs. Olds
- Diane Rousseau as Barbara
- Lois Markle as Sheilah
- James Noble as Canon Pritchard
- Ralph Puroum as Murray
- Ralph Waite as Olson
- Jo Ann Harris as Lu
- Linda Blair as Barby
- Anne Ramsey as Scott's Wife (Uncredited)

== Home Video ==
The Sporting Club was released to home video on October 25, 2022 by Kino Lorber as a Region 1 Blu-Ray.
