= Jo Ann Harris =

American actress

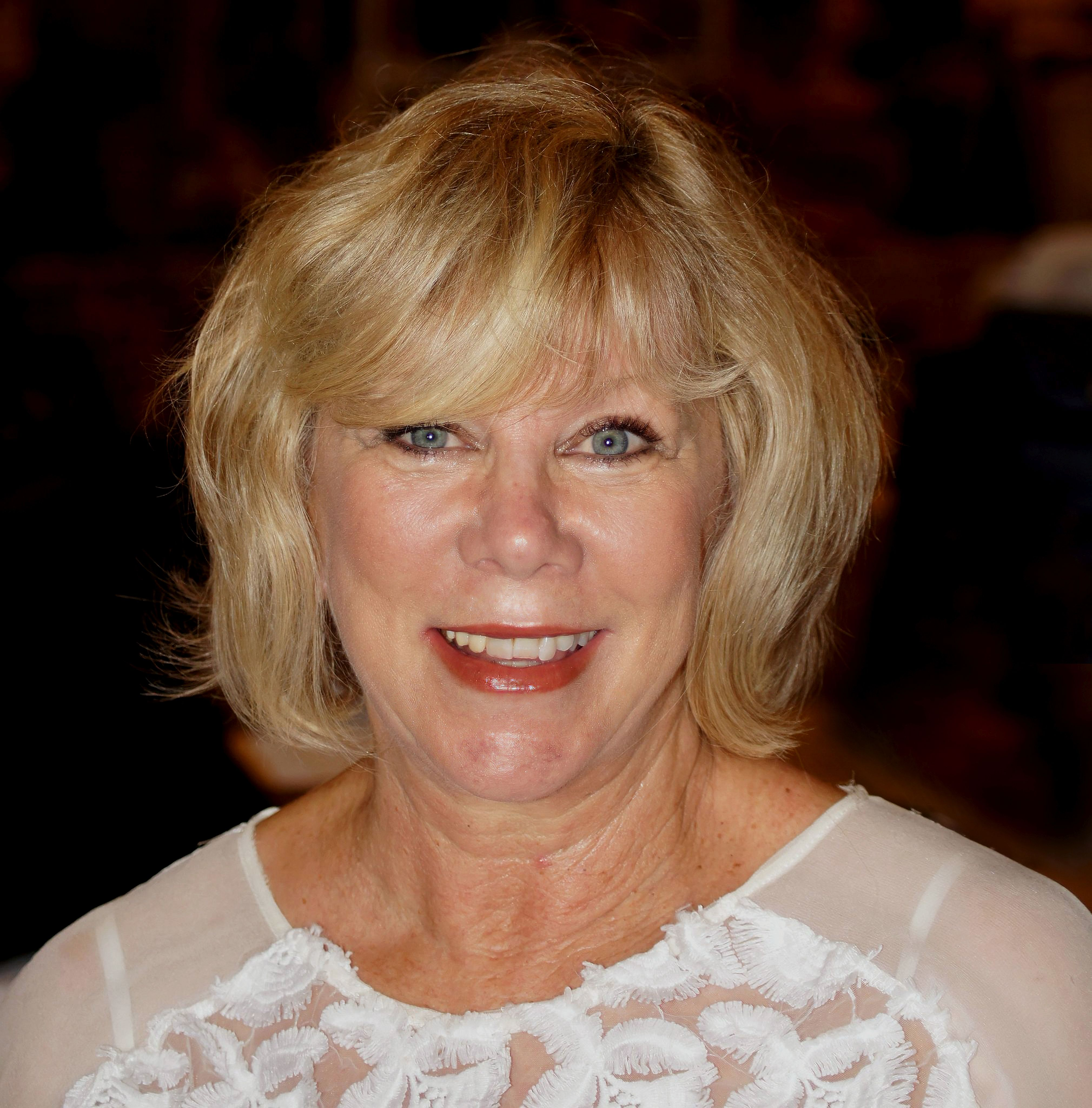
- Harris in August 2021
- Occupation: Actress
- Years active: 1967–present
- Spouse: Jerry Belson (m. 1976; died 2006)

Jo Ann Harris is an American actress known for her many film and television roles beginning in 1967. In the 1971 film The Beguiled she portrayed a 17-year-old who seduced Clint Eastwood's character. Her other films include Maryjane (1968), The Gay Deceivers (1969), The Sporting Club (1971), The Parallax View (1974), Act of Vengeance (1974), Cruise into Terror (1978), and Deadly Games (1982).

== Career ==
Harris's first acting role came in the drama series Run for Your Life (starring Ben Gazzara) in 1967 when she was 18 years old. Other guest-starring TV credits include Adam-12; Dragnet 1968; Gunsmoke; The High Chaparral; The Virginian/The Men of Shiloh; Medical Center; Walt Disney's Wonderful World of Color; The Mod Squad; The F.B.I.; Barnaby Jones; Hawaii Five-O; Nakia; The Streets of San Francisco; The Love Boat; Fantasy Island; Vega$; B.J. and the Bear; Rich Man, Poor Man; Laverne & Shirley; and State of the Union. She was also a panelist on Match Game 77 for a week.

She played a co-starring role in the short-lived 1977 series Most Wanted (starring Robert Stack).

Her voice acting work includes the voice of Tina in the 1973 Hanna-Barbera animated series Goober and the Ghost Chasers, the animated film Oliver & Company (1988), and various episodic characters in The Simpsons.

She played Candy Cantwell, the interviewer, and Terri in eight episodes of Tracey Ullman's State of the Union during 2008–2010.

== Filmography ==
Year	Title	Role	Notes
1967	The Second Hundred Years	Mod Girl	TV series
1968	Run for Your Life	Girl	TV series
1968	Dragnet 1968	Jo-Elle Murphy	TV series
1968	Maryjane	Jo Ann	
1968	Judd for the Defense	Ginny Baker	TV series
1969	The Gay Deceivers	Leslie Devlin	
1969	Gunsmoke	Ellie Wylie	TV series
1969	Adam-12	Susann Baker	TV series
1969	The High Chaparral	Annie Croswell	TV series
1969–1972	The Mod Squad	Sue Fielding / Sally	TV series
1970–1971	The Virginian	Amanda Benson / Mary Ann Travers	TV series
1970–1972	Medical Center	Dana / Ellen Farley	TV series
1971	The Sporting Club	Lu	
1971	The Smith Family	Lynn Mitchell	TV series
1971	Cat Ballou	Cat Ballou	short film
1971	Teenage Tease		
1971	The Beguiled	Carol	
1972	Michael O'Hara the Fourth	Mike' O'Hara IV	TV movie
1972	Disney-Land	Mike' O'Hara IV	TV series
1972	The Bold Ones: The New Doctors	Danielle Tate	TV series
1972	Banyon	Sally Overman	TV series
1972-1973	The Streets of San Francisco	Connie / Lita Brewer	TV series
1973	Goober and the Ghost Chasers	Tina	TV series, voice
1973	The F.B.I	Tish Laramie	TV series
1974	The Parallax View	Chrissy – Frady's Girl	
1974	Act of Vengeance	Linda	
1974	Nakia	Kitty	TV series
1974-1978	Barnaby Jones	Ellie Beck / Lisa Murphy / Lorna Pearson	TV series
1975	Hawaii Five-O	Laurie	TV series
1975	The Manhunter	Sandy	TV series
1975	Movin' On	Sandy	TV series
1975	Kate McShane		TV series
1975	Rich Man, Poor Man	Gloria Bartley	TV series
1976	Bert D'Angelo/Superstar	Amy	TV series
1976–1977	Most Wanted	Officer Kate Manners	TV series
1977	Fred Flintstone and Friends	Tina	TV series, voice
1977	Love Boat	Connie Evans	TV series
1977	Anna Karenina	Susan Cord	TV series
1978	Cruise Into Terror	Judy Haines	TV movie
1978	Fantasy Island	Andrea Chambers	TV series
1979	Vegas	Christy	TV series
1979	The Wild Wild West Revisited	Carmelita	TV movie
1979	Detective School	Teresa Cleary	TV series
1979	Beyond Death's Door	Laurie	
1979	B.J. and the Bear	Barbara Sue	TV series
1979	A Man Called Sloane	Johanna	TV series
1980	M Station: Hawaii	Karen Holt	TV movie
1980	Xanadu	40's Singer #1	
1981	American Dream	Myra	TV series
1982	Deadly Games	Clarissa Jane Louise 'Keegan' Lawrence	
1983	Laverne & Shirley	Jane	
1984	The Duck Factory	Wendy Wooster	TV series
1988	Oliver & Company	Additional Voices	voice
1989–1992	The Simpsons	Various Voices	TV series, voice
1991	Caged Fear	Big as a House #1	
1995	What-a-Mess	Felicia	TV series, voice
1997–1999	Tracey Takes On...	Fawn Loving	TV series
2008–2010	Tracey Ullman's State of the Union	Candy Cantwell / Terri / Interviewer	TV series
