= Thompson's Ghost =

Thompson's Ghost is a 1966 TV movie. It was a pilot for a series.

Lorenzo Semple Jr co wrote it. It was a vehicle for Bert Lahr and was made by Bing Crosby's production company.

== Plot ==
A ghost makes life difficult for a family.

== Cast ==
- Phyllis Coates as Milly Thompson
- Pamela Dapo as Annabelle Thompson
- Trudy Howard as Nurse
- Barry Kelley as Chief Watson
- Bert Lahr as Henry Thompson
- Tim Matheson as Eddie Thompson
- Robert Rockwell as Sam Thompson
- Willard Waterman as Doctor Wheeler
