= Anna (1987 film) =

1987 film

- Promotional theatrical poster
- Directed by: Yurek Bogayevicz
- Written by: Yurek Bogayevicz; Agnieszka Holland
- Produced by: Deirdre Gainor; Julianne Gilliam; Gábor Dettre
- Starring: Sally Kirkland; Paulina Porizkova; Robert Fields
- Cinematography: Bobby Bukowski
- Edited by: Julie Sloane
- Music by: Greg Hawkes
- Distributed by: Vestron Pictures
- Release date: October 2, 1987
- Running time: 100 minutes
- Country: United States
- Language: English
- Budget: $1 million
- Box office: $1.2 million

Anna is a 1987 American comedy drama film directed by Yurek Bogayevicz and starring Sally Kirkland, Robert Fields, Paulina Porizkova, Steven Gilborn and Larry Pine. It was adapted by Agnieszka Holland from an unauthorized story by Holland and Bogayevicz, based on the real-life relationship of Polish actresses Elżbieta Czyżewska and Joanna Pacuła.

Anna received widespread critical acclaim upon release, with high praise directed towards Kirkland's performance. She earned a nomination for the Academy Award for Best Actress, in addition to winning the Golden Globe Award for Best Actress in a Motion Picture – Drama and the Independent Spirit Award for Best Female Lead.

== Plot ==
Krystyna, an aspiring actress, journeys from her native Czechoslovakia to New York City in search of her idol Anna, an actress who was once famous in her homeland. Anna was imprisoned in Czechoslovakia after speaking out against the new regime after the 1968 Communist invasion, and was later banned from reentry to the country. Tonda, Anna's then-husband and a director of equal renown, was in Paris at the time of the invasion and has since become successful in the United States making music videos for MTV. Anna, who is now middle-aged and struggles to land parts in films and theatre, becomes a mentor for Krystyna and her fledgling acting career.

As Anna manages to land a gig as an understudy for an off-Broadway play, she also tutors Krystyna in the English language and gives her a makeover. Krystyna blossoms as Anna's protégée, but when she uses Anna's life experiences as fodder for a TV show, the women's friendship starts to show strain.

== Cast ==
- Sally Kirkland as Anna
- Paulina Porizkova as Krystyna
- Robert Fields as Daniel
- Stefan Schnabel as Professor
- Steven Gilborn as Tonda
- Gibby Brand as Director #1
- Ruth Maleczech as Woman #1
- John Robert Tillotson as Director #2
- Joe Aufiery as Stage Manager
- Lance Davis as Assistant #1
- Deirdre O'Connell as Assistant #2
- Larry Pine as Baskin
- David R. Ellis as Daniel's Father
- Sofia Coppola as Noodle
- Jean Milmark as Laughing Lady at Audition

== Critical reception ==
Sheila Benson of the Los Angeles Times wrote that Anna "is the best kind of surprise--a small, frequently funny, fine-boned film set in the worlds of the theater and movies which unexpectedly becomes a consummate study of love, alienation and loss." She described Kirkland's performance as "a blazing comet" and complimented Porizkova, Fields, and Maleczech. Though Benson critiqued director Bogayevicz's "melodramatist’s flair for sudden rainstorms to underscore emotional scenes", she said these touches were redeemed by the cast and Holland's ear for dialogue. Critic Emanuel Levy wrote, "Perhaps only a foreign screenwriter and a foreign director could have made the witty and cynical Anna, a movie about an expatriate Czech actress in New York, struggling with her progressive age, ruthless competition, sheer survival and other problems inherent in showbiz."

Janet Maslin of The New York Times was less effusive and said the film was cliché-laden with too many unconvincing elements, though she praised Kirkland's performance. The film was likened by multiple critics as another version of All About Eve. Writing for The Spectator, Hilary Mantel commended Bogayevicz and Holland, writing "their careful thought and commitment is evident" and "they have allowed scope for a fine central performance — intense, observant and painful — by Sally Kirkland".

== Accolades ==
Award	Category	Nominee(s)	Result
Academy Awards	Best Actress	Sally Kirkland	Nominated
Deauville American Film Festival	International Critics Awards	Yurek Bogayevicz	Nominated
Golden Globe Awards	Best Actress in a Motion Picture – Drama	Sally Kirkland	Won
Independent Spirit Awards	Best Female Lead	Sally Kirkland	Won
Independent Spirit Awards	Best Screenplay	Agnieszka Holland	Nominated
Independent Spirit Awards	Best First Feature	Yurek Bogayevicz	Nominated
Los Angeles Film Critics Association Awards	Best Actress	Sally Kirkland	Won (Note: Tied with Holly Hunter for Broadcast News.)
Torino Film Festival	Best Feature Film	Yurek Bogayevicz	Won
Valladolid International Film Festival	Best Film	Yurek Bogayevicz	Nominated
Valladolid International Film Festival	Best First Film	Yurek Bogayevicz	Won
