= The Longest Silence =

Book by Thomas McGuane

- Author: Thomas McGuane
- Language: English
- Subject: Essays on fly fishing
- Publisher: Alfred A. Knopf
- Publication date: November 12, 1999
- Publication place: New York
- Pages: 280
- ISBN: 978-0-679-45485-4
- OCLC: 754953961
- Dewey Decimal: 799.12

The Longest Silence is a 1999 collection of fly fishing essays by American author Thomas McGuane.

Consisting of 33 essays, it has received critical praise both for its depictions of fishing as well as the quality of McGuane's prose.

== Reception ==
The collection was named by Sports Illustrated as one of the five best fly fishing books of all time. Fly fishing author John Gierach called The Longest Silence "the best fly fishing book ever written" while Jim Harrison said that McGuane "writes about fishing better than anyone else in the history of mankind."

Skip Clement, editor of Fly Life Magazine, said: "In anything fishing, fly fishing, McGuane speaks the language of anglers through his characters." Writing in The Spectator magazine, David Profumo commented: "McGuane shows how a novelist can bring to the pages of sport those qualities of tension, nuance and dark humour that make his own fiction glimmer - this collection of 33 essays is a model of its type, the anatomy of an obsession." In the New York Times Mary Grace Butler provided a positive review: "His observations on the mechanics of fishing are entertaining as well as technical, but it is the gentle, elegiac descriptions laced with crisp opinion that draw the reader in."

== Translation ==
The book has been translated into Italian under the title of Il grande silenzio: una vita trascorsa pescando.

As of 2025, McGuane is the only individual to be an inductee into the Fly Fishing Hall of Fame.
