= The Penguin Goes Straight =

- Batman episode
- Episode no.: Season 1 Episode 21
- Directed by: Leslie H. Martinson
- Written by: Lorenzo Semple Jr. and John Cardwell
- Production code: 8723-Pt. 1
- Original air date: March 23, 1966

Guest appearances
- Kathleen Crowley; Al Checco; Harvey Lembeck; Special Guest Villain: Burgess Meredith as The Penguin

Episode chronology
← Previous "Better Luck Next Time"	Next → "Not Yet, He Ain't"

"The Penguin Goes Straight" is the 21st episode of the Batman television series, first airing on ABC March 23, 1966. It guest starred Burgess Meredith as The Penguin.

== Plot ==
Attending a matinee performance at a Gotham City theatre, the Penguin foils a thief's attempts to steal a ruby from the beautiful actress Sophia Starr. Then, at the Millionaire's Club, he stops two crooks from kidnapping millionaire Reggie Rich from a steam room. When Batman and Robin arrive, the Penguin announces his Penguin Protection Agency, which will protect the wealth of Gotham City's society crowd. Batman and Robin are immediately suspicious, believing this to be a plot to steal Sophia Starr's jewels, which Penguin has been hired to protect; they send Alfred Pennyworth, in the guise of an insurance company agent, to photograph the jewellery and switch Penguin's cigarette holder for one with a hidden microphone; however, a bug detector located in the handle of the Penguin's umbrella spoils Alfred's ruse, and he only just manages to escape with the photos. After using the pictures to create fake jewels, the Caped Crusader and the Boy Wonder break into Sophia's apartment in order to swap them with the real jewels, but they are caught red-handed by the Penguin and his agents and charged with burglary....
