= Soft Toilet Seats =

- Theatrical release poster
- Directed by: Tina Valinsky
- Written by: Tina Valinsky
- Produced by: Shirley Craig; Dave Stauffacher
- Cinematography: Stephen Timberlake
- Edited by: Robbie Adler; Lynel Moore; John Refoua; Nancy Rosenblum
- Music by: Louis Durra; Jeffrey R. Gund
- Production company: STS Productions Inc.
- Distributed by: Phaedra Cinema
- Release date: December 3, 1999 (Limited)
- Running time: 107 minutes
- Country: United States
- Language: English

Soft Toilet Seats is a 1999 comedy film written and directed by Tina Valinsky and starring David Rosen, Alexa Jago and Jonathan Aube. It first had a limited release in the United States on December 3, 1999, before commercially releasing on March 10, 2000.

== Plot ==
Pharmacist Arne Steinberg (David Rosen) is tricked into purchasing a mansion in the city from his best mate, only to learn that the previous owner (Sammi Davis) was either killed or committed suicide. Tilly Rensley, former roommate of hers (Alexa Jago) helps Arne unravel the mystery.

== Cast ==
- David Rosen as Arne Steinberg (as David Alex Rosen)
- Alexa Jago as Tilly Rensley
- Jonathan Aube as Joey Carpini
- Sammi Davis as Annie Ashland
- Michael Greene as Detective Colson
- Margaret Blye as Margaret Lennox
