= Loren Singer =

American writer

- Born: Loren Adelson Singer; March 5, 1923; Buffalo, New York
- Died: December 19, 2009 (aged 86); Valhalla, New York
- Education: Ohio State University
- Occupation: Novelist
- Spouse: Erma Rosenstadt
- Writing career
- Notable work: The Parallax View

Loren Adelson Singer (March 5, 1923, – December 19, 2009) was an American novelist, known best for his 1970 political thriller The Parallax View, which was made into a successful 1974 movie of the same name.

== Early life ==
Singer was born in Buffalo, New York, on March 5, 1923. After completing high school he enlisted in the United States Army. He was sent to Yale University by the Office of Strategic Services to study the Malay language, but World War II ended before he could serve active duty. While with the OSS, Singer learned details of covert operations that became the theme of many of his novels. After the war, in 1947, he earned an undergraduate degree in English from the Ohio State University and married Erma Rosenstadt.

== Career ==
Singer and his wife moved to New York City in the early 1950s. There he worked for his father-in-law's printing business while writing for such television programs as Kraft Television Theater, Studio One, and Westinghouse Playhouse.

His 1970 novel The Parallax View was adapted into the film of the same name, which tells the story of a reporter who investigates a series of deaths of witnesses of the assassination of a presidential aspirant whose death has been attributed to a lone gunman. The book was published in 1970, when there was much controversy about a series of political assassinations during the previous decade. Its success allowed Singer to quit his job as a printing salesman working for his father-in-law. The movie features actors Warren Beatty, Hume Cronyn, William Daniels, and Paula Prentiss.

Other novels by Singer include the 1973 police procedural That's the House, There, in which the story is told as the telephone conversations of a police sergeant, and his 1974 Boca Grande, about intrigue in Cuba concerning a Bahamas-Jamaica yacht race. His 1993 novel Making Good is the story of a conspiracy discovered by U.S. Army soldiers who find a trove of art looted by the Germans during World War II.

== Death ==
A resident of Mamaroneck, New York, Singer died on December 19, 2009, aged 86. He was survived by his wife, three sons, and six grandchildren.

== Novels ==
- The Parallax View (Doubleday, 1970)
- That's the House, There (Doubleday, 1973)
- Boca Grande (Doubleday, 1974)
- Making Good (Henry Holt, 1993)
