= Sammi Davis =

British actress (born 1964)

- Born: Samantha Davis; 21 June 1964 (age 62); Kidderminster, Worcestershire, England
- Other name: Sammi Davis-Voss
- Occupation: Actress
- Years active: 1986–present
- Spouses: Kurt Voss (m. 1990; div. 1993); Simon Drew (m. 2009)

Samantha "Sammi" Davis (born 21 June 1964) is an English actress. She gained considerable praise for her performances in Mona Lisa (1986), as a teenage prostitute, and Ken Russell's The Rainbow (1989). She also had significant roles in Mike Hodges' A Prayer for the Dying and John Boorman's Hope and Glory (both 1987).

In 1988, Sammi Davis had a major supporting role in another Ken Russell movie, The Lair of the White Worm, where she carried the part of the Mary Trent farm resident as Peter Capaldi's love interest. Between 1991 and 1993, Sammi Davis had a lead as Caroline Hailey in the successful American television series, Homefront.

== Personal life ==
From 1990 to 1993, Davis was married to director Kurt Voss. After taking a few years out of the film industry to raise her family, she returned to the screen in a cameo role on Lost, playing the mother of Dominic Monaghan's character. She moved back to Britain in Christmas 2008. On 21 June 2009, she married Simon Drew, a children's TV show producer.

As of 2024, Sammi Davis lives in Sussex with her family and maintains a well-known corporate photography studio in Barnet, North London.

== Selected filmography ==
=== Film ===
Year	Title	Role	Notes
1986	Mona Lisa	May	
1987	A Prayer for the Dying	Anna	
1987	Lionheart	Baptista	
1987	Hope and Glory	Dawn Rohan	
1988	Consuming Passions	Felicity	
1988	The Lair of the White Worm	Mary Trent	
1989	The Rainbow	Ursula Brangwen	
1989	Shadow of China	Katharine	
1990	Horseplayer	Randi	
1995	Four Rooms	Jezebel	Segment: "The Missing Ingredient"
1997	Stand-Ins	Martha Anne-Jean Harlow's Stand-in	
1998	Assignment Berlin	Tracy Garret	
1998	Woundings	Denise Jones	
1999	Soft Toilet Seats	Annie Ashland	
2008	The Double Born	Sophonisba	

=== Television ===
Year	Title	Role	Notes
1986	The Day After the Fair	Anna May Dunsford	Television film
1986	Auf Wiedersehen, Pet	Pippa	Episode: "The Return of the Seven: Part 1"
1987	Pack of Lies	Julie Jackson	Television film
1991	The Perfect Bride	Stephanie	Television film
1991	Chernobyl: The Final Warning	Yelena Mashenko	Television film
1992	Indecency	Nia Barnett	Television film
1991–1993	Homefront	Caroline Hailey	42 episodes
1994	Red Shoe Diaries	Brandy	Episode: "You Make Me Want to Wear Dresses"
1994	Spring Awakening	Aimée Daumar	Television film
2006	Lost	Mrs. Pace	Episode: "Fire + Water"
