= Maggie Blye =

American actress (1942–2016)

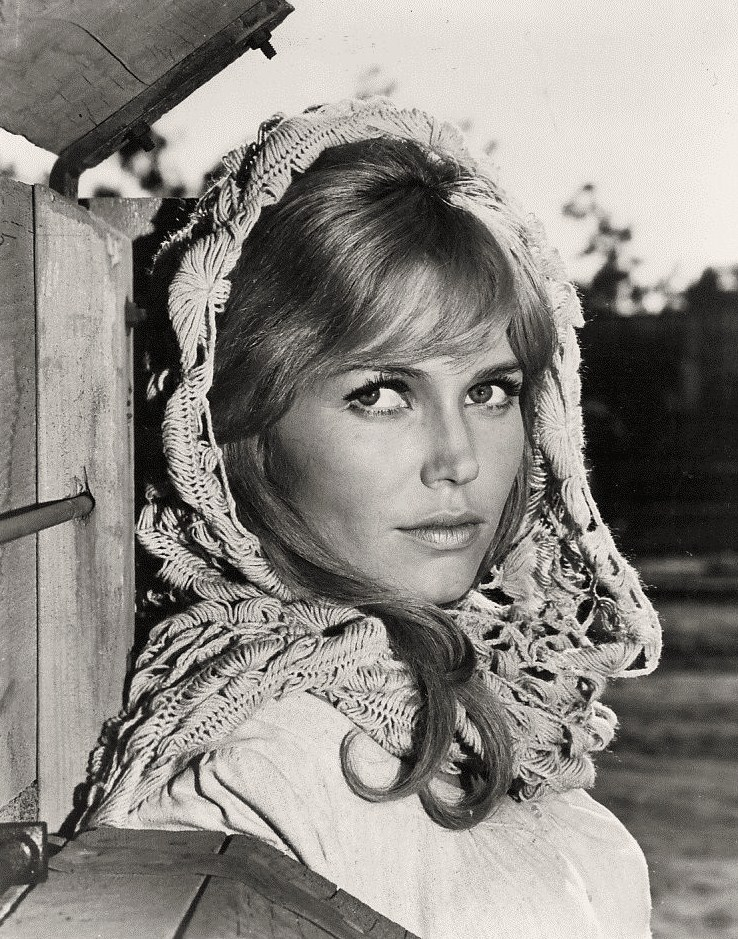
- Blye in Hombre 1967
- Born: Margaret Jane Blye; October 24, 1942; Houston, Texas, U.S.
- Died: March 24, 2016 (aged 73); West Hollywood, California, U.S.
- Occupation: Actress
- Years active: 1961–2010
- Relatives: Judy Blye Wilson (sister)

Margaret Jane Blye (October 24, 1942 – March 24, 2016) was an American actress, also sometimes billed as Margaret Bly. She was best known for playing Michael Caine's character Charlie's girlfriend Lorna in The Italian Job (1969).

== Early years ==
Her sister was casting director Judy Blye Wilson. After studying business at the University of Texas, she went to UCLA, where she became involved in acting. Her performance in a production of West Side Story there was seen by a talent scout for 20th Century Fox studios.

== Television ==
Blye was a regular on the ABC-TV program Kodiak in the role of police radio dispatcher Maggie.

She appeared in a number of popular television series. Among her first roles was that of defendant Betty Kaster in the 1965 Perry Mason episode, "The Case of the Lover's Gamble." She also appeared on Hazel, Ben Casey and twice on Gunsmoke (credited as Margaret Bly playing the simply named character “Girl” in the 1964 episode “Journey For Three” - S9E36 and the following year in a much larger role as a conniving gold digger named “Karen” in S10E22’s “Winner Take All”).

Her later television roles included Hart to Hart, The Rockford Files, and Lois & Clark: The New Adventures of Superman. She appeared in four episodes of the series In the Heat of the Night, including the pilot episode.

== Film ==
Blye appeared in the 1967 Paul Newman film Hombre. She also starred in the 1969 classic film The Italian Job as Michael Caine's girlfriend Lorna, as well as Waterhole No. 3 (1967) starring James Coburn. Blye appeared with Coburn again in the 1975 film Hard Times. Her other movie roles included The Sporting Club (1971), Walking Tall: Final Chapter (1977), the third film about the life of Sheriff Buford Pusser, and the horror film, The Entity (1982) as well as playing Elizabeth Taylor's daughter in Ash Wednesday.

Blye's career took a turn in the late 1970s. Her obituary in the online version of The Telegraph pointed out: "By the end of the decade, however, Maggie Blye was no longer being considered for romantic roles. 'In the space of two years,' she noted, 'I went from playing daughters to mothers.'"

Blye appeared in several films in the 2000s, including 2004's Last Goodbye and the 2005 horror comedy The Gingerdead Man.

Blye was active in the Academy of Motion Picture Arts and Sciences after joining in 1968. She was a member of the organization's Foreign Language Film Award Screening Committee.

== Death ==
Blye died on March 24, 2016, from cancer at her home in West Hollywood, California, aged 73.

== Selected filmography ==
- Summer and Smoke (1961) as Dusty (uncredited)
- Hombre (1967) as Doris
- Waterhole No. 3 (1967) as Billee Copperud
- Diamonds for Breakfast (1968) as Honey
- The Italian Job (1969) as Lorna
- The Sporting Club (1971) as Janey
- Every Little Crook and Nanny (1972) as Stella Ganucci
- Ash Wednesday (1973) as Kate Sawyer
- Hard Times (1975) as Gayleen Schoonover
- Mayday at 40,000 Feet! (1976) as Susan Mackenzie
- Walking Tall: Final Chapter (1977) as Luan Paxton
- Little Darlings (1980) as Ms. Bright
- Hart to Hart (1981) as Brenda
- Liar's Moon (1982) as Ellen 'Babs' Duncan
- The Entity (1982) as Cindy Nash
- Kidco (1984) as Joan Cessna
- Mischief (1985) as Claire Miller
- Soft Toilet Seats (1999) as Margaret Lennox
- The Gingerdead Man (2005) as Betty Leigh
