= Deadly Games (1982 film) =

- Directed by: Scott Mansfield
- Screenplay by: Scott Mansfield
- Produced by: Raymond Dryden
- Starring: Jo Ann Harris; Sam Groom; Steve Railsback; Denise Galik; Colleen Camp; June Lockhart
- Cinematography: R. Michael Stringer
- Edited by: Stuart Eisenberg
- Music by: Hod David Schudson; Richard Thompson
- Production company: Great Plains Films
- Distributed by: Cobra Media
- Release date: September 2, 1982 (St. Louis)
- Running time: 95 minutes
- Country: United States
- Language: English

Deadly Games is a 1982 American slasher film written and directed by Scott Mansfield, and starring Alexandra Morgan, Jo Ann Harris, Sam Groom, Steve Railsback, Denise Galik, Colleen Camp, and June Lockhart. It follows a small town terrorized by a ski-masked serial murderer targeting young women.

== Plot ==
Linda Lawrence is attacked by a ski-masked intruder in her rural home, and pushed from a second story window to her death. Her sister, Clarissa "Keegan" Lawrence, a successful journalist, returns to their hometown upon the news of her sister's death. Linda's death is investigated by police officer Roger Lane, who attempts to determine whether it was an accident, suicide, or a murder. At a local diner, Keegan runs into several female friends and acquaintances from high school: Mary Adams, Chris Howlett, Carol Bailey, Randy, and Susan Theresa "Sooty" Lane, the latter of whom is married to Roger.

After visiting with her estranged mother, Marge, Keegan attends a flag football game with her old friends and acquaintances. There, she notices a brooding man sitting on the sidelines whom she does not immediately recognize. Mary informs her the man is Billy Owens, a former classmate of theirs, and a Vietnam War veteran who sustained significant injuries in battle. The introverted Billy now works at the local movie theater changing film reels, and has a close friendship with Roger over their mutual service in Vietnam.

At a pool party later that night, Roger gets angry with Randy after finding her kissing another man. She rebukes him, telling him she is not beholden to him as they have merely carried on a casual affair. After the party ends, a ski-masked assailant attacks Randy in the pool, binding her legs with wire and anchoring her to a grate at the bottom, effectively drowning her. After the news of Randy's death, Keegan meets Chris at a bar, where a worried Chris tells her that Linda and Randy were both dating the same man, but she does not name him.

Roger meets Keegan at Linda's home where she is staying, and the two go to see a movie at the theater while Billy is working; Billy accompanies the two during the screening, and afterward the three spend hours talking and playing a board game. A romance begins to blossom between Keegan and Roger. A short time later, Chris is attacked in a parking garage by the killer, who manages to strangle her unconscious, though his attempt to kill her is thwarted when two lot attendants interrupt the attack.

Later, Roger reveals to Sooty that he is the killer, and strangles her to death. Shortly after, Chris is attacked again late at night while driving her car by the killer in the backseat. She stops the vehicle and flees on foot into the woods, eventually stumbling upon an overgrown cemetery. The killer manages to capture her before burying her alive in a grave. Later, Roger sits in the theater basement and recounts to himself how he unintentionally caused Linda's death by trying to simply frighten her; the thrill he received from her dying, however, propelled him to begin actively committing murders.

Keegan visits the movie theater after Roger fails to arrive at a restaurant for a date. In the theater basement, she is startled by Roger and shoots him to death. Billy then appears, and stalks Keegan through the theater basement. In a disarrayed prop room, Keegan finds Sooty's corpse lying among mannequins. She runs upstairs, stumbling on the theater stage. Billy, over an intercom, chastises Keegan for killing Roger, his only friend. The lights suddenly go out, and Billy swings on a rope from the rafters toward Keegan to kill her.

== Cast ==
- Jo Ann Harris as Clarissa Jane Louise 'Keegan' Lawrence
- Sam Groom as Roger Lane
- Saul Sindell as Tom
- Steve Railsback as Billy Owens
- Denise Galik as Mary Adams
- Dick Butkus as Joe Adams
- Christine L. Tudor as Chris Howlett
- Robin Hoff as Carol Bailey
- Jere Rae Mansfield as Susan Theresa 'Sooty' Lane (as Jere Lea Rae)
- Colleen Camp as Randy
- June Lockhart as Marge Lawrence
- Alexandra Morgan as Linda Lawrence
- William Patrick Johnson as Bob Bailey

== Release ==
Deadly Games aired on television networks such as Showtime in the spring of 1982. It was given regional theatrical releases in the United States, opening in St. Louis on September 2, 1982. It subsequently screened in Kansas City, Missouri on November 5, 1982, as part of a triple-bill at local drive-in theaters.

Deadly Games was released on Blu-ray by Arrow Films in the United States and United Kingdom on February 22, 2022.
