= Guild Entertainment =

UK video distribution company

Guild Home Video
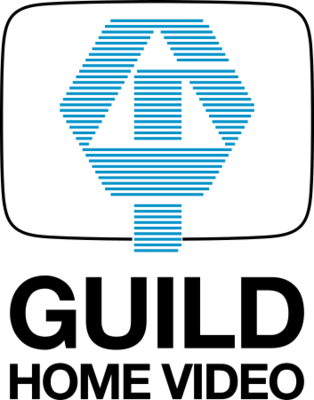
- Guild Home Video logo (1980)
- Formerly: Legibus Thirty-Six Limited (1976); Esselte Communications Limited (1976–1982); The Guild Organization Limited (1982–1986)
- Industry: Film distribution, home video
- Founded: October 1976; 50 years ago
- Defunct: 1998; 28 years ago (label); 17 December 2019; 7 years ago (company)
- Fate: Merged and rebranded into Pathé
- Headquarters: Oundle Road, Peterborough, England

Guild Home Video (GHV) or Guild Film Distribution was one of the first video distribution companies to start operating in the UK. Unlike other independent labels such as Intervision or Videoform, GHV not only survived for a very long time, but continued to grow, eventually becoming a video distributor for independent studios such as Carolco, New Line Cinema, Cannon, and Lorimar.

== Origins ==
Originally based in Oundle Road, Peterborough before moving to Church Street, Walton-on-Thames, Guild Home Video were one of the biggest of the early video companies, and responsible for distributing a large and varied catalogue of movies. The initial batch of releases came out in mid-1980 and were easily recognisable by the sky blue, stylised 'G' symbol that the company retained throughout its life (with only a colour change to gold in 1987) and the logo was redrawn for an updated, cleaner look in 1984. The original Guild catalogue included a large array of features ranging from creaky and dated British science-fiction/horror fare such as The Beast in the Cellar, The Body Stealers and Doomwatch, to documentary/non-fiction titles such as The Entertaining Electron and Reardon on Snooker as well as recent box office hits such as David Cronenberg's Scanners and Jack Nicholson's remake of The Postman Always Rings Twice. Many classic Australian movies such as My Brilliant Career, Breaker Morant and Money Movers were also released at that time too.

The original catalogue was uncommonly large by the standards of most labels at that time, with well over 100 titles released within the first two years of trading alone, and Guild became well known for the professionalism of its product. At a time when many of the independent labels were resorting to tacky and often distastefully lurid cover designs to get its products noticed (Go Video's Cannibal Holocaust/SS Experiment Camp and Vipco's The Driller Killer being prime examples), GHV adopted a much more subtle approach. Early Guild covers were colour-coded. Cassettes for "hire only" carried a Pink band round the base of the sleeve, while later Hire/Sale cassettes carried a sky blue band round the top. There were also a number of tapes with a yellow band as well, but these are all but extinct now and desirable when found.

== Growth ==
Guild Home Video continued to grow steadily throughout the 1980s, notable especially as one of the very few independent labels to survive the 1984 Video Recordings Act (1). This ruinous and reactionary response to the "Video Nasties" crisis meant that any movie available on video had to carry a BBFC video certificate. As each film would cost hundreds of pounds to classify if re-submitted, many independent labels found it uneconomic to submit their entire back catalogues and several simply went out of business. GHV, by now exclusive distributors to the likes of Cannon, The Samuel Goldwyn Company and Lorimar were able to continue on the strength on their newer titles and the older back catalogue generally disappeared from view. More successful titles such as Straw Dogs and Suppose They Gave a War and Nobody Came were among the first budget "sell through" titles to appear when Video Collection began retailing cut-price movies in 1986. In 1986, it also saw the launch of Guild's short-lived Frontier brand. It apparently released just seven titles. Between 1991 and 1992, Guild revived a brand but under the name Capital Home Video, which only released indie titles and a few known titles such as Halloween 5: The Revenge of Michael Myers.

In 1986, it entered into an agreement with Karl-Lorimar Home Video to release titles for the British home video market. Later that year, it inked into an agreement with Medusa Communications in order that Guild Home Video to supply Medusa for Guild two titles a month per year, in effect at the end of January, and marked the first time the company, which had three titles a month, had to distribute titles by other companies, and the company already had a two-year pact with CBS/Fox Video.

In 1987, Guild decided to expand and supply into theatrical distribution via subsidiary Guild Film Distribution (formerly Guild International Distributors), and it was on good terms with film distributor Carolco Pictures in order to acquire all UK rights to Extreme Prejudice, as well as video rights to Carolco's upcoming pictures Angel Heart and Rambo III, and decided into a package of three films that were produced by New Century Entertainment, which included Russkies, Nowhere to Hide and Kid Gloves, and picked up home video rights to an Australian feature, which was Coolangatta Gold, and Guild picked up theatrical rights to A Prayer for the Dying, which was produced by The Samuel Goldwyn Company.

Until the mid-1990s, Guild Film Distribution also operated in the Czech Republic, where it distributed Disney films as well under the name Hollywood Classic Entertainment.

== Decline ==
By the early 1990s, the home video industry was changing drastically as the video trade was being dominated more and more by the major studios. It was in this climate that GHV had its climax in major success. In 1988, they secured a distribution deal with Hollywood mini-major Carolco Pictures, which resulted in them gaining exclusive UK video rights for big budget blockbuster movies such as Terminator 2: Judgment Day, Total Recall, Cliffhanger, Rambo III and Judge Dredd.

In 1989, Wembley PLC purchased Guild from Esselte. In August 1992, Chargeurs, the then-parent company of French film company Pathé, acquired Guild Entertainment Limited from Wembley PLC for $36.3 million, Guild would therefore become Pathé's de facto UK distributor. The purchase was made to extend Chargeurs' realm in the global film market.

In 1992, Guild entered into an agreement with Pioneer LDCE, the European subsidiary of Pioneer LDC, to release 140 films to the Laserdisc market in the United Kingdom, most notably Terminator 2: Judgement Day and Dances with Wolves.

On 14 March 1995, Guild entered into a 50-50 joint-venture partnership with the UK branch of 20th Century Fox. With the announcement, the video rental arms of FoxVideo and Guild merged into a single business, known as Fox Guild Home Entertainment. The retail distribution of Guild products, which at that point was handled by PolyGram Video, also moved to Fox, with Guild also relocating their offices over to Fox's UK offices in Soho. However, both companies would continue to market their own titles and the theatrical arms would be unaffected. The venture was created as part of an expanding partnership Chargeurs had with Fox, which included the existing FPC Video (Fox Pathé Canal) venture in France.

On 27 February 1996, Chargeurs announced that they would demerge their entire entertainment division under the Pathé name, including Guild Entertainment. Shortly after the merger, Pathé began the process of retiring the Guild brand, rebranding Guild's theatrical arm as Guild Pathé Cinema Limited. On 10 June 1997, after gaining a six-year lottery franchise to produce movies in the United Kingdom, Pathé announced that they would rename and reincorporate Guild Pathé Cinema as Pathé Distribution. The Pathé brand would soon replace Guild on home video releases that same year, although the Guild brand continued to be used on VHS labels and for the rental joint-venture until 1998. Fox Guild Home Entertainment was renamed Fox Pathé Home Entertainment shortly afterwards.

The Guild Home Video subsidiary remained as an in-name-only dormant business of Pathé until folding on 17 December 2019.

== See also ==
- Pathé
