= John Refoua =

American film editor

- Refoua in 2013
- Born: 1960–1965 (Note: Sources differ about Refoua's birth year. (Note: Attributed to multiple references:))
- Died: May 14, 2023; Santa Monica, California, U.S.
- Occupation: Film editor
- Years active: 1990–2023
- Spouse: Serena Refoua
- Children: 1

John Djahanshah Refoua was an American film editor who graduated from Oberlin College in 1980 with a Bachelor’s degree in Economics.

He started his career as an editor in 1990, working on the television crime series Twin Peaks, where he served as an assistant editor for two episodes. After serving as the lead editor on an episode of the action series Raven, Refoua's work focused on television until his first feature film, Soft Toilet Seats in 1999.

When Refoua was hired as an editor for the series Dark Angel, he met producer and director James Cameron. The two collaborated on several projects, including Ghosts of the Abyss (2003) and the Avatar films. Refoua was nominated, alongside James Cameron and Stephen E. Rivkin, for Best Film Editing for Avatar at the 2009 Academy Awards. Refoua also worked on the television series New York Undercover, Touched by an Angel and Law & Order. Refoua died from complications related to bile duct cancer while working on Avatar: Fire and Ash (2025), which is dedicated to his memory.

Refoua was married to Serena Bell Refoua for 32 years. They share one son, Aaron James Refoua.

== Awards ==
Refoua won two awards and was nominated for an additional eight.

Wins:

- 2010 Broadcast Film Critics Association Awards for Best Editing on Avatar, shared with Stephen E. Rivkin
- 2009 Phoenix Film Critics Society Awards for Best Film Editing on Avatar, shared with James Cameron and Stephen E. Rivkin

Nominations:

- 2009 Awards Circuit Community Award for Best Film Editing on Avatar, shared with Stephen E. Rivkin and James Cameron
- 2010 Academy Awards for Best Achievement in Film Editing on Avatar, shared with Stephen E. Rivkin and James Cameron
- 2010 BAFTA Awards for Best Editing on Avatar, shared with Stephen E. Rivkin and James Cameron
- 2010 American Cinema Editors—Best Edited Feature Film (Dramatic) for Avatar, shared with Stephen E. Rivkin and James Cameron
- 2010 Hollywood Post Alliance—Outstanding Editing on a Feature Film on Avatar, shared with Stephen E. Rivkin and James Cameron
- 2010 Online Film & Television Association—Best Film Editing on Avatar, shared with Stephen E. Rivkin and James Cameron
- 2010 Online Film Critics Society Award for Best Editing on Avatar, shared with Stephen E. Rivkin and James Cameron

== Filmography ==
Year	Title	Director	Notes
1999	Soft Toilet Seats	Tina Valinsky	Co-edited with Robbie Adler, Lynel Moore, and Nancy Rosenblum
2003	Ghosts of the Abyss	James Cameron	Co-edited with David C. Cook, Ed W. Marsh, and Sven Pape
2007	Reno 911!: Miami	Robert Ben Garant	
2007	Balls of Fury	Robert Ben Garant	
2009	Avatar	James Cameron	Co-edited with Stephen E. Rivkin, and James Cameron
2013	21 & Over	Jon Lucas, and Scott Moore	
2013	Olympus Has Fallen	Antoine Fuqua	
2014	The Equalizer	Antoine Fuqua	
2015	Southpaw	Antoine Fuqua	
2016	The Magnificent Seven	Antoine Fuqua	
2017	Transformers: The Last Knight	Michael Bay	Co-edited with Mark Sanger, Debra Neil-Fisher, Roger Barton, Adam Gerstel, and Calvin Wimmer
2017	Geostorm	Dean Devlin	Co-edited with Ron Rosen, and Chris Lebenzon
2022	Avatar: The Way of Water	James Cameron	Co-edited with Stephen E. Rivkin, David Brenner, and James Cameron
2025	Avatar: Fire and Ash	James Cameron	Posthumous release; co-edited with Stephen E. Rivkin, Nicholas de Toth, Jason Gaudio, James Cameron, and David Brenner
