= Waterhole No. 3 =

1967 Western comedy film by William A. Graham

Waterhole #3
- Directed by: William A. Graham
- Screenplay by: Joseph T. Steck; Robert R. Young
- Produced by: Owen Crump; Joseph T. Steck; Ken Wales; Blake Edwards
- Starring: James Coburn; Carroll O'Connor; Margaret Blye; Timothy Carey; Claude Akins; Joan Blondell
- Cinematography: Robert Burks
- Edited by: Warren Low
- Music by: Dave Grusin
- Production company: Geoffrey Productions
- Distributed by: Paramount Pictures
- Release date: November 17, 1967
- Running time: 95 minutes
- Country: United States
- Language: English
- Box office: $2,700,000 (US/ Canada)

Waterhole #3 is a 1967 Western comedy film directed by William A. Graham. It is considered to be a comic remake of The Good, the Bad, and the Ugly.

The film stars James Coburn, Carroll O'Connor and Margaret Blye. The cast also includes Bruce Dern, James Whitmore, Claude Akins, Joan Blondell and Timothy Carey, and it was the last film shot by Robert Burks before his death in 1968. Roger Miller performs the theme song and performs snippets of music throughout the film as a form of narration. The film is a Blake Edwards production.

== Plot ==
In Arizona, a shipment of gold bullion is stolen in an inside job by a group of men consisting of U.S. Army Sgt. Henry Foggers, assigned to guard the gold, Doc Quinlen, the mastermind of the caper, and Hilb, a billy-goat-bearded ruffian. They take shoemaker Ben Akajanian hostage and dig a tunnel from his parlor to the Army deposit next door. The gold is then buried by Quinlen in the desert, near Waterhole No. 3. Some time later, Quinlen is then killed by Lewton Cole, a professional gambler, after an altercation in which Cole discovers a map to the buried treasure scrawled on a $20 bill.

Foggers and Hilb, along with Ben (who they have taken along to make it look as if he was the thief), set out to find Cole and the gold. At the same time, U.S. Cavalry captain named Shipley is also looking for the stolen gold along with his detachment. Cole, meanwhile, stops at the town of Integrity and gets a headstart on the local law enforcement after the killing by locking up Sheriff John Copperud and his deputy in their own jail, then forcing them to disrobe and hand over their clothes.

Cole rides to the sheriff's ranch, steals his horse and rapes Billee, the sheriff's daughter. Copperud returns to the ranch and infuriates Billee by being more upset over losing his horse than about Cole's treatment of her. After Copperud leaves the ranch chasing for Cole, Billee also heads into the desert.

Copperud catches up with Cole just as the latter finds the gold. Cole is put under arrest, but befriends the sheriff and manages to convince him to take the gold for themselves. However, as they march back to town, they are ambushed by Foggers and his companions, who take the gold along with their horses and leave them tied in the middle of the desert. Nonetheless, Billee arrives at the scene after a while and frees them both. Knowing that Foggers intends to cross the border to Mexico, the three return to Integrity, full aware that the bandits should have to spend the night there.

Foggers tells Hilb to stay guard on the local hotel while he and the shoemaker head for the brothel. As Cole and company approach the place, they are spotted by Hilb, who barricades inside his room. Instead of trying to storm in, Cole and Copperud decide to keep an eye from the room across the hallway and wait until Foggers returns. Next morning, in spite of their plans, Hilb manages to escape the hotel, leading to a gunfight that results in the thief dropping his half of the gold and running away from town. Foggers then enters the fray, and in the confusion, Ben manages to flee with the loot. Cole, Copperud and Foggers set out in pursuit, only to enter head on in Shipley's campfire; Ben is already there.

When questioned, Foggers states that he has been in pursuit of the thieves, while Cole declares that Quinlen's death was an act of self-defense. Copperud corroborates both tales, thus leaving Ben as the culprit. However, in Ben's saddlebag there is nothing but rocks, so it is assumed that he must have dropped the gold in the trail between Integrity and the camp. Billee gets to the place just as everyone leaves to find where Ben has stashed the gold, leaving only Billee and Ben in the Army camp. Cole backtracks in time to see Billee gallop off, leaving Ben alone. Cole follows Billee to some rocks where Ben has hid the gold, and has sex with her. Still, Cole departs with the gold and the sheriff's horse a few moments later, and Billee is both angry and distraught as he, once more, has left her behind.

All the others arrive to the place where Billee is, sitting on a rock watching the horizon. When asked about the gold, she points in Cole's direction, who can be seen riding on the rim of a distant ridge, and everybody departs in hot pursuit.

== Cast ==
- James Coburn as Lewton Cole
- Carroll O'Connor as Sheriff John Copperud
- Margaret Blye as Billee Copperund
- Timothy Carey as Hilb
- Claude Akins as Sergeant Henry Foggers
- Bruce Dern as Deputy
- Joan Blondell as Lavinia
- James Whitmore as Captain Shipley
- Harry Davis as Ben Agajanian
- Jennifer Gan as Dove (uncredited)

== Production ==
The movie was based on an original script by Joseph Steck and Robert Young. The film was produced by Blake Edwards as part of a four-picture deal he had at Paramount (this would also result in Gunn and Darling Lili with the fourth film never made). However the director was Will Graham, making his feature debut as director. Filming took place in late 1966 at Lone Pine, California.

== Reception ==
Roger Ebert gave the film two stars.

== See also ==
- List of American films of 1967
