= 1987 Los Angeles Film Critics Association Awards =

Annual US film awards ceremony

13th LAFCA Awards
- Date: December 19, 1987

Highlights
- Best Picture: Hope and Glory

The 13th Los Angeles Film Critics Association Awards were announced on 19 December 1987 and given on 21 January 1988.

== Winners ==
- Best Picture:
  - Hope and Glory
  - Runner-up: The Last Emperor
- Best Director:
  - John Boorman – Hope and Glory
  - Runner-up: James L. Brooks – Broadcast News
- Best Actor (tie):
  - Steve Martin – Roxanne
  - Jack Nicholson – Ironweed and The Witches of Eastwick
- Best Actress (tie):
  - Holly Hunter – Broadcast News
  - Sally Kirkland – Anna
- Best Supporting Actor:
  - Morgan Freeman – Street Smart
  - Runner-up: Sean Connery – The Untouchables
- Best Supporting Actress:
  - Olympia Dukakis – Moonstruck
  - Runner-up: Vanessa Redgrave – Prick Up Your Ears
- Best Screenplay:
  - John Boorman – Hope and Glory
  - Runner-up: John Patrick Shanley - Moonstruck
- Best Cinematography:
  - Vittorio Storaro – The Last Emperor
  - Runner-up: Philippe Rousselot - Hope and Glory
- Best Music Score:
  - David Byrne, Ryuichi Sakamoto and Cong Su – The Last Emperor
  - Runner-up: John Williams - The Witches of Eastwick
- Best Foreign Film:
  - Au Revoir les Enfants • France/West Germany
  - Runner-up: My Life as a Dog (Mitt liv som hund) • Sweden
- Experimental/Independent Film/Video Award:
  - Gus Van Sant – Mala Noche
- New Generation Award:
  - Pedro Almodóvar – Law of Desire (La ley del deseo)
- Career Achievement Award (tie):
  - Samuel Fuller
  - Joel McCrea
- Special Citation:
  - Weapons of the Spirit
