= A Prayer for the Dying =

1987 film by Mike Hodges

- Theatrical release poster
- Directed by: Mike Hodges
- Written by: Jack Higgins; Edmund Ward; Martin Lynch
- Produced by: Samuel Goldwyn Jr; Ass. producers: Bruce Rubenstein
- Starring: Mickey Rourke; Bob Hoskins; Alan Bates
- Cinematography: Michael Garfath
- Edited by: Peter Boyle
- Music by: Bill Conti
- Distributed by: Guild Film Distribution (UK); The Samuel Goldwyn Company (US)
- Release date: 11 September 1987
- Running time: 108 minutes
- Countries: United Kingdom; United States
- Language: English
- Budget: $6 million
- Box office: $1,432,687

A Prayer for the Dying is a 1987 thriller film about a former IRA member trying to escape his past. The film was directed by Mike Hodges, and stars Mickey Rourke, Bob Hoskins, Alan Bates and Liam Neeson. The film is based on the 1973 Jack Higgins novel of the same name.

== Plot ==
The film begins with an IRA team, including Martin Fallon (Mickey Rourke) and Liam Docherty (Liam Neeson), watching as two British Army Land Rovers approach a roadside bomb they have set for them. At the last minute, a school bus overtakes the army vehicles and detonates the bomb, killing the children. The team flees the scene, and Fallon travels to London to escape the past and decides never to kill anyone again. In London, he is approached by a contact to take on one last killing contract on behalf of local gangster cum funeral director Jack Meehan (Alan Bates) and his brother Billy Meehan (Christopher Fulford), to eliminate another gangster, in return for money, a passport and passage to the USA. Initially reluctant, he nonetheless takes on the job and kills the target, but is seen by the local Catholic priest, Father Michael Da Costa (Bob Hoskins). Jack learns there is a witness to the killing.

Fallon visits the church and confesses to Fr Michael in a bid to ensure his silence; he also meets the priest's blind niece Anna (Sammi Davis), who lives at the church with her uncle; she starts to fall in love with Fallon. Meehan, however, insists that Fallon must kill the priest too and tells Fallon he will not be paid until the loose end is tied up. Fallon now finds himself targeted by the cops, the Meehans and the IRA, who now see him as a risk, and send Docherty and another member, Siobhan Donovan (Alison Doody), to London to persuade him to return to Ireland failing which Fallon should be killed. Fallon refuses to return, but Docherty hesitates to kill Fallon at the last moment.

Billy Meehan eventually decides to take matters in his own hands and goes to the church looking for Fallon, but Anna kills him in a struggle when he attacks her in the church house. Fallon disposes of Billy's corpse in Jack's own crematorium. Siobhan kills Docherty at the behest of the IRA. Jack tries to trick and get Fallon killed aboard a boat he is assured would be taking him to the US, but he sees through this and makes Meehan's men strip completely naked, before throwing them off the boat, without killing them.

Returning to the church, Fallon finds Jack Meehan trying to bomb the church and kill the priest and his niece, which he thinks will be blamed on Fallon and his IRA connections. After a struggle, Anna and Michael escape, but the explosion kills Meehan and leaves Fallon fatally injured. In his dying moments, Fallon confesses his past to the priest, who grants him absolution. Fallon dies in peace.

== Cast ==
- Mickey Rourke as Martin Fallon
- Bob Hoskins as Father Da Costa
- Alan Bates as Jack Meehan
- Sammi Davis as Anna
- Christopher Fulford as Billy Meehan
- Liam Neeson as Liam Docherty
- Leonard Termo as Bonati
- Camille Coduri as Jenny Fox
- Maurice O'Connell as Miller
- Alison Doody as Siobhan Donovan
- Karl Johnson as Fitzgerald
- Ian Bartholomew as Kristou

== Production ==
It had previously been adapted for Canadian TV in 1985 with Sean Mulcahy in the lead role.

Producer Peter Snell succeeded in raising the entire budget from Sam Goldwyn. Originally Franc Roddam was going to direct A Prayer for the Dying but left during pre-production due to creative differences with Snell. "Rodham apparently wanted to make an Irish 'Rambo,' " said Alan Bates, "whereas Peter was aiming for something with far less violence and far more suspense."

"It's very Graham Greene-ish, this story," said Hodges. "And the characters are straight out of Dickens. Rat-like crooks, old London warehouses, cemeteries-and a blind girl, Anna (Sophie Ward), who is Da Costa's niece."

"The script (by Edmund Ward) that I was sent by (producer) Peter Snell was a very good adaptation of Jack Higgins' novel," Rourke said. But he was worried it would be too violent. "That is not a kind of picture I want to make in any case, and especially not the kind of picture I wanted to make after doing some research on Northern Ireland."

Rourke wanted the script to reflect Fallon's background, such as the conditions of the Irish Catholics, ("They're not unlike the conditions of the blacks in the south in America before the civil rights movement of the sixties," said Rourke) and sectarianism. "I thought that the script needed some of this information to explain why my character, Fallon, picked up a gun."

Mickey Rourke was paid £1 million to star in the film. This was part of the play or pay deal.

"He's contributed a lot of good ideas to the script," said Hodges. "He's very good in this. But then I've always liked his work. He's spent months perfecting an Irish accent. He really looks the part."

Hodges worked on the script too. "I think my main contribution was to make this killing Fallon's last," he said. "In Ireland he killed for political reasons. This last one he does for self-preservation. In the original story he went on killing people, which I thought wouldn't work for us. It made him just another hoodlum."

Originally Inseminoid music composer John Scott had composed the film but was fired due to creative differences from the producers and they hired Bill Conti to finish the score.

Tony Earnshaw recalls in his book Made in Yorkshire that another film version of the novel was planned in the 1970s to film in Leeds, the city where the original book was set, starring Lee Marvin and directed and written by Edward Dmytryk. Photos of the two men looking at Leeds locations for the film are shown in Earnshaw's book.

As part of his research for his character Mickey Rourke met some IRA members.

For the priest character, Hodges said, "Priests can be so sanctimonious on the screen, and I didn't want a Barry Fitzgerald or a Bing Crosby. I wanted him to be more a working-class priest, a rough diamond." He cast Bob Hoskins.

Alan Bates was cast as the villain. "Only once before – in a Pinter play called One for the Road – have I played an absolute, out-and-out villain," Bates said. "There's a kind of ghastly pleasure in playing people like that – it's a side of oneself that, if it's there, one doesn't usually explore. This man in A Prayer for the Dying is so caught up in his own evil that he's lost perspective, though in a very peculiar way he has his own morality. He won't hurt old ladies, for example, and he takes genuine pride in what he does: death is an art form to him. The film is about conscience, but there's a macabre wit and a heightened sense of style in it."

Filming began in October 1986.

=== Editing dispute ===
Hodges said he delivered his cut of the film to Goldwyn in March and the company, without consulting him, re-edited it and replaced its musical score. Hodges tried to take his name off as he felt the studio had drastically altered the film. He called it, "a piece of schlock for the American market divested of any kind of poetry or subtlety." Jack Higgins called it the best film made from one of his novels.

"They tried to use music to soften Fallon," Hodges said. "They felt he was unpleasant and unsympathetic and that they could overcome that with music. I said, 'If you don't like Fallon, there is nothing you can do – with music or anything else – to make him likable.' I don't think they ever understood the character. What they have done to (the movie) makes quite certain the audience will never understand him, either."

"I don't like it; I don't like the music; it has no tension and I don't want my name associated with it," Hodges said in 1987. "I have written to Goldwyn twice asking to have my name removed from it. I got no reply to either one. They said it was too late to take my name off the prints and all the promotional materials. But they had shown the film to others earlier. Obviously, they just didn't want to deal with my problems."

According to film producer Peter Snell, only three minutes had been cut out.

"There's a guy in the United States called Sam Goldwyn Jr. who's a . . . and he lied," Rourke said at the Cannes Film Festival. "I thought we had a deal with a handshake. I was making a small movie that I hoped would make things clearer about what's going on [in Northern Ireland]. He wanted to turn it into a big commercial extravaganza-type thing."

Goldwyn said "I won't say the experience [of making the movie] was terribly happy, but it's a good picture and he [Rourke] is very good in it."

"It isn't often a writer gets his work so accurately brought to the screen", Higgins wrote.

== Reception ==
The film was due to open the London Film Festival on 11 November 1987 but was pulled following the IRA's Remembrance Day bombing in Enniskillen on 8 November.

A Prayer for the Dying had a mixed reaction. Some liked Rourke's performance. Others found fault in his Irish accent. Other critics thought Bob Hoskins was miscast in his portrayal of the priest.

On the review aggregator website Rotten Tomatoes, 50% of 12 critics' reviews are positive, with an average rating of 5/10.

== Director's cut ==
There were rumours that there was going to be a director's cut of the film as Mike Hodges had a critical hit film Croupier. That release was going to be by MGM. Both region 1 and 2 have the original theatrical release. A copy of the director's cut is preserved in the BFI special collection.
