= Thomas McGuane =

American writer (born 1939)

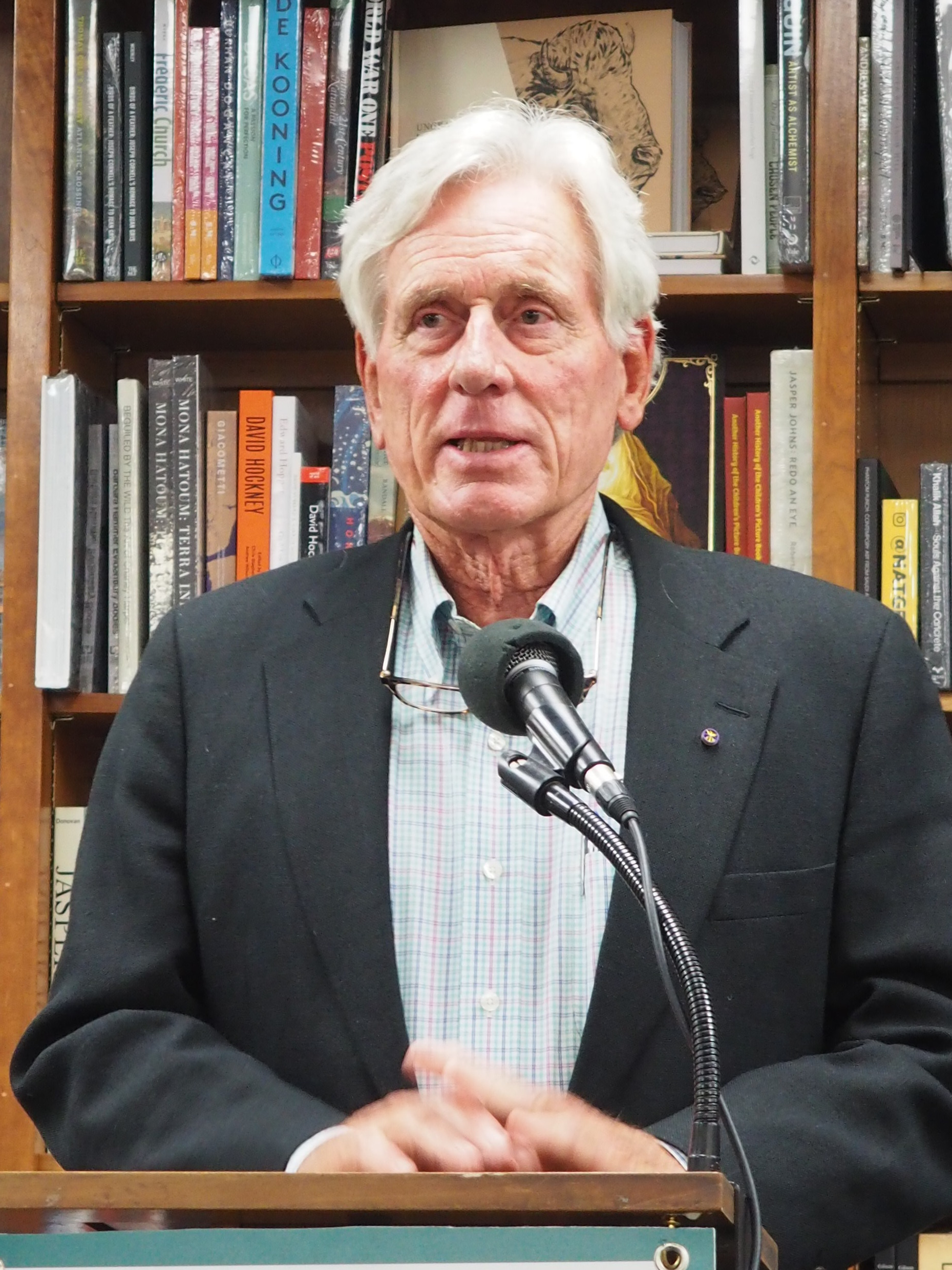
- McGuane in 2018
- Born: Thomas Francis McGuane III; December 11, 1939 (age 86); Wyandotte, Michigan, U.S.
- Education: University of Michigan; Olivet College; Michigan State University (BA); Yale School of Drama (MFA)
- Occupations: Writer; novelist; film director; screenwriter
- Spouses: Portia Rebecca Crockett (m. 1962; div. 1975) Margot Kidder (m. 1976; div. 1977) Laura Buffett (m. 1977)
- Children: 3
- Writing career
- Genres: Fiction, nonfiction, screenwriting

Thomas Francis McGuane III (born December 11, 1939) is an American writer. His work includes ten novels, short fiction and screenplays, as well as three collections of essays devoted to his life in the outdoors. He is a member of the American Academy of Arts and Letters, the NCHA Members Hall of Fame and the Fly Fishing Hall of Fame. McGuane's papers, manuscripts, and correspondence are located in the Montana State University Archives and Special Collections and are available for research use. In 2023, he was given the first Award for Excellence in Service to the MSU Library for the advancement of scholarship and access to unique materials.

McGuane's early novels were noted for a comic appreciation for the irrational core of many human endeavors, multiple takes on the counterculture of the 1960s and 1970s. His later writing reflected an increasing devotion to family relationships and relationships with the natural world in the changing American West, primarily Montana, where he has made his home since 1968, and where his last five novels and many of his essays are set. He has three children, Annie, Maggie and Thomas.

== Early life ==
McGuane was born in Wyandotte, Michigan, the son of Irish Catholic parents who moved to the Midwest from Massachusetts. His primary education included boarding school at Cranbrook School, but also included work on a ranch in Wyoming, and fishing and hunting. A difficult relationship with his alcoholic father would later shadow much of his fiction. McGuane prefers to consider his roots matrilineal, on which he is descended from a rich storytelling clan.

He envisioned himself as a writer from a very young age, admiring what he perceived as the adventurous life of a writer as much as the prospect of writing. When he was ten years old, he got into a physical altercation with a friend over differing descriptions of a sunset. He began a serious devotion to writing by the age of 16.

== Career ==
After briefly attending the University of Michigan and University of Olivet, McGuane graduated from Michigan State University, where he received a BA in English in 1962 and met the writer Jim Harrison. He and Harrison became lifelong friends, bonding over a love for nature. At the Yale School of Drama, where he obtained an MFA in 1965, he studied playwriting and dramatic literature. A Stegner Fellowship to Stanford University in 1966–67 allowed him to finish his first published novel, The Sporting Club, published in 1969.

Upon completing his Stegner Fellowship, McGuane and his first wife, Rebecca Portia Crockett, began to divide their time between Livingston, Montana, and Key West, Florida. When the screen rights to The Sporting Club were purchased, he bought ranch property in Montana's Paradise Valley. His second novel, The Bushwhacked Piano, appeared in 1971. Jonathan Yardley in The New York Times called McGuane "a talent of Faulknerian potential," while Saul Bellow described McGuane as "a language star." The novel won the Rosenthal Award of the American Academy of Arts and Letters.

McGuane's third novel, Ninety-Two in the Shade (1973), is perhaps his best known. It was nominated for a National Book Award.

In 1973, he crashed his Porsche on an icy Texas highway. While not seriously injured, he was left speechless for several days.

He reassessed his career and changed his focus to Hollywood's lucrative screenwriting opportunities. He entered a period where he became known as "Captain Berserko" and wrote screenplays for Rancho Deluxe (1975), shot in Livingston; The Missouri Breaks (1976), directed by Arthur Penn and starring Jack Nicholson and Marlon Brando; and self-directing a film adaptation of 92 in the Shade (1975), starring Peter Fonda, Warren Oates, Margot Kidder and Harry Dean Stanton.

The early 1970s included an affair with actress Elizabeth Ashley, divorce from first wife Becky (who went on to marry Peter Fonda), marriage to actress Margot Kidder, the birth of their daughter, Maggie, and his second divorce—all in less than a year.

McGuane published his most autobiographical novel, Panama, in 1978. The character Catherine was said to be a literary embodiment of McGuane's third wife, Laurie Buffett, sister of Jimmy Buffett, one of McGuane's Key West comrades. With the exception of positive reviews in The New Yorker and The Village Voice, the novel was mercilessly panned by critics as self-absorbed and a testament to wasted literary talent—notwithstanding McGuane's protests that he considered it his best novel.

An ongoing struggle ensued between McGuane and his reviewers concerning their expectations for his fiction, and their sense of how much McGuane's celebrity was intruding upon his work. The upheaval of the period concluded with the deaths of McGuane's father, mother, and sister in the span of 30 months.

McGuane won the 2016 Robert Kirsch Award the lifetime achievement of the Los Angeles Times Book Prize, was a finalist for the National Magazine Award in 2013 for his story "River Camp", and was a finalist for the Frank O'Connor International Short Story Award in 2015 for his work Gallatin Canyon.

In 2018, he appeared in conversation with Richard Powers at the New York Public Library. In 2024 he appeared in a film about his time spent fishing and writing in the Florida Keys with other notable writers such as Jim Harrison, Richard Brautigan, Russell Chatham, and Jimmy Buffett.

== Life after Panama ==
After Panama, McGuane's novels changed considerably. Beginning with Nobody's Angel in 1981, the setting has consistently been in Montana, usually in the fictitious town of “Deadrock” (presumably a play on “Livingston”).

He moved from Paradise Valley to a different property in the Boulder River valley near McLeod, Montana.

Larry McMurtry observed that McGuane's nonfiction writing displays a markedly contrasting inner peace and natural spirituality. McGuane's paeans to fly fishing (The Longest Silence), horses (Some Horses) and the outdoors (An Outside Chance) capture his belief in the redemptive potential of nature and sporting ritual.

== Selected works ==
Fiction

- The Sporting Club (1969, novel)
- The Bushwacked Piano (1971, novel)
- Ninety-Two in the Shade (1973, novel)
- The Missouri Breaks (1976, screenplay, paperback original)
- Panama (1978, autobiographical novel)
- Nobody's Angel (1981, novel)
- In the Crazies: Book and Portfolio (1984; ltd. ed. of 185)
- Something to Be Desired (1985, novel)
- To Skin a Cat (1986, short stories)
- The Best American Short Stories (1986, story contribution, "Sportsmen")
- Keep the Change (1989, novel)
- Nothing but Blue Skies (1992, novel)
- The Cadence of Grass (2002, novel)
- The Best American Short Stories (2004, story contribution, "Gallatin Canyon")
- The Best American Short Stories (2005, story contribution, "Old Friends")
- The Best American Short Stories (2006, story contribution, "Cowboy")
- Gallatin Canyon (2006, short stories)
- Driving on the Rim (2010, novel)
- Crow Fair (2015, short stories)
- The Best American Short Stories 2015 (2015, story contribution, "Motherlode")
- Cloudbursts: Collected and New Stories (2018, short stories)
- A Wooded Shore (2025, short stories)

Non-fiction

- An Outside Chance (1981)
- Best American Sports Writing, 1992 (1993)
- Live Water (1996)
- The Best American Essays (1997, essay contribution, "Twenty-fish Days")
- The Best American Sports Writing (1997, essay contribution, "The Way Home")
- Some Horses (1999)
- The Longest Silence (2000)
- Upstream: Fly Fishing in the American Northwest (1999)
- Horses (2005)
- The Best American Sports Writing (2005, essay contribution, "Seeing Snook")
- The Best American Mystery Stories (2012, essay contribution, "The Good Samaritan")
- The Best American Mystery Stories (2015, essay contribution, "Motherlode")

Screenplays

- Rancho Deluxe (1975)
- 92 in the Shade (1975)
- The Missouri Breaks (1976)
- Tom Horn (1981)
- Cold Feet (1989)
- Partners (1993)
