= The Sporting Club =

- Author: Thomas McGuane
- Language: English
- Publication date: 1968

The Sporting Club is the 1968 debut novel of author Thomas McGuane.

== Plot summary ==
The Sporting Club chronicles the friendship and rivalry of Vernor Stanton, an unstable patrician iconoclast, and the protagonist, Stanton's lifelong friend, James Quinn. Throughout the course of the novel, Stanton enlists Quinn on a series of misadventures and wild episodes, the aim of which is to ultimately destabilize the Centennial Club, a summer sporting resort for upper-class Michigan families, of which both men are members.

== Film adaptation ==
The Sporting Club was adapted into a 1971 movie by director Larry Peerce and screenwriter Lorenzo Semple, Jr. The film starred Nicolas Coster as Quinn, Robert Fields as Stanton, and Maggie Blye as Stanton's wife, Janey.
