= Robert Fields =

American actor

- Born: July 10, 1934 (age 92)
- Occupation: Actor

Robert Samuel Fields (born July 10, 1934) is an American actor who has appeared in film and television. A life member of The Actors Studio, Fields is known for his role as Daniel in the 1987 drama film Anna.

== Early life and education ==
Fields was born to Mr. and Mrs. Lee Fields of Brookline, Massachusetts. His father was a restaurateur.

Fields graduated from Carnegie Mellon University and Neighborhood Playhouse School of the Theatre.

== Career ==
Fields appeared with Steve McQueen in the 1958 science fiction horror film The Blob (1958), playing Tony Gressette. It was Fields' film debut. He later provided commentary in 2000, when the film was released on DVD by The Criterion Collection.

He played Joel in the 1969 film They Shoot Horses, Don't They? (1969).

Fields portrayed the character Will in the 1970 film Cover Me Babe.

Fields also co-starred with Sally Kirkland in Anna (1987).

One of his final performances to date was as Jay Smiley in The Souler Opposite (1998).

== Personal life ==
On June 26, 1983, Fields married Betty-Jane Robbins, then a marketing director for trade books at Harcourt Brace Jovanovich in San Diego, at the Fairview Country Club in Greenwich, Connecticut. Their wedding was performed by Rabbi H. Leonard Poller.

Fields was a friend of The Blob (1958) co-star Steve McQueen.

== Selected filmography ==
- The Blob (1958) as Tony Gressette
- Frankenstein Meets the Space Monster (1965) as Reporter (uncredited)
- The Incident (1967) as Kenneth Otis
- They Shoot Horses, Don't They? (1969) as Joel
- Cover Me Babe (1970) as Will
- The Sporting Club (1971) as Vernur Stanton
- Rhinoceros (1974) as Young Man
- The Stepford Wives (1975) as Raymond Chandler
- Looking for Mr. Goodbar (1977) as Rafe (uncredited)
- A Secret Space (1977) as Eli
- Night-Flowers (1979) as Trasker
- Jet Lag (1981) as Tom
- Star 80 (1983) as Director
- Blood Feud (1983) as Gene Sears
- Anna (1987) as Daniel
- Miami Vice Episode 5x15 "Over the Line " (1989)
- Getting Away with Murder (1996) as Sergeant Roarke
- American Strays (1996) as Harry
- The Souler Opposite (1998) as Jay Smiley
- Charades (1998) as Paul Curtiss
- Little Dreams (2002) as Will Peterson (final film role)
