= Lorenzo Semple Jr. =

American writer (1923–2014)

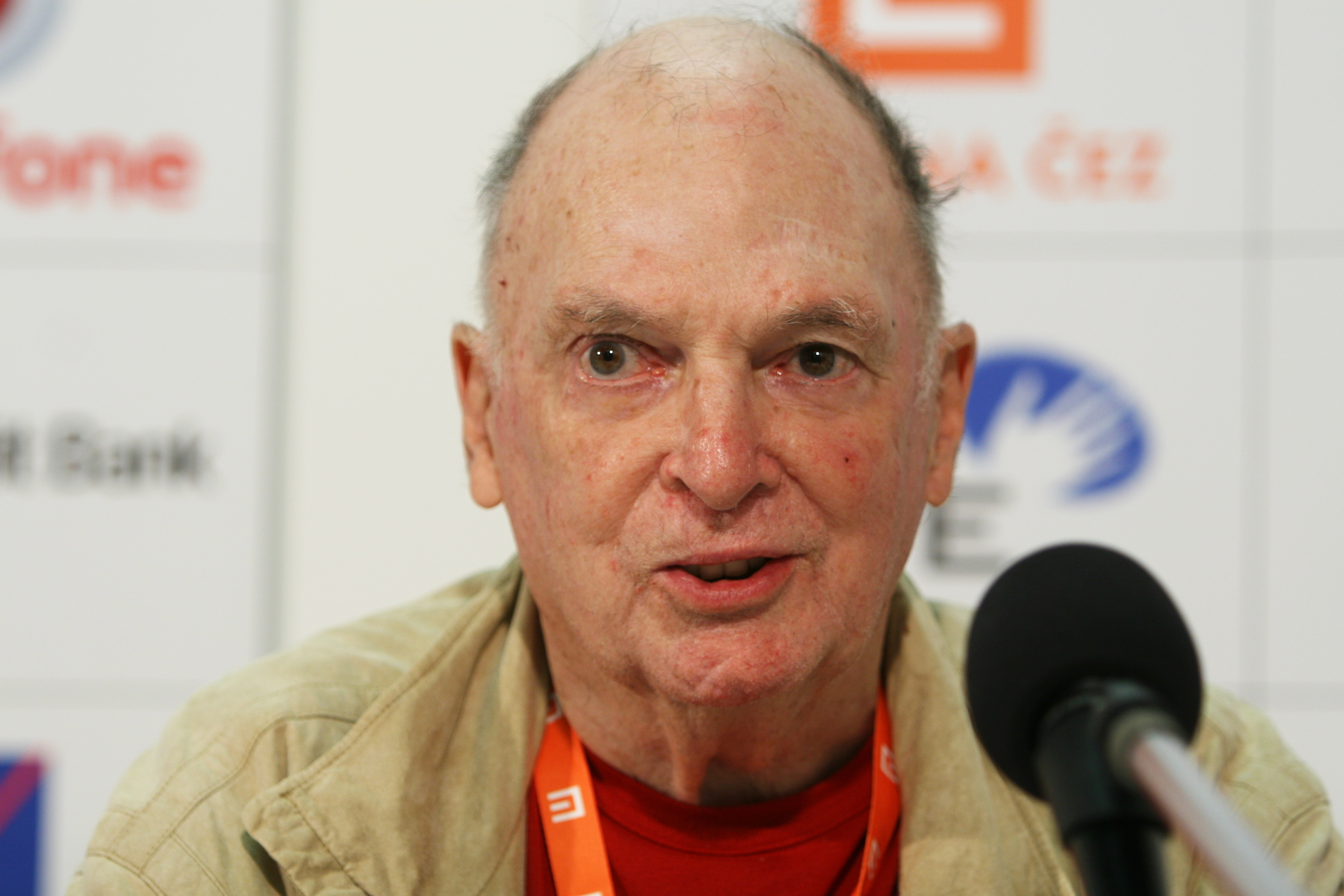
- Semple in 2008
- Born: Lorenzo Elliott Semple III; March 27, 1923; New Rochelle, New York, U.S.
- Died: March 28, 2014 (aged 91); Los Angeles, California, U.S.
- Education: Brooks School
- Occupation: Writer
- Years active: 1951–1996
- Spouse: Joyce Miller (m. 1963)
- Children: 3; including Maria Semple

Lorenzo Elliott Semple III (March 27, 1923 – March 28, 2014), known professionally as Lorenzo Semple Jr., was an American writer. He is best known for his work on the television series Batman, as well as political thriller films The Parallax View (1974) and Three Days of the Condor (1975).

== Early life ==
Semple attended the Brooks School in North Andover, Massachusetts, graduating in 1940. He then attended Yale University, but left in 1941 to join the American Field Service in North Africa during World War II, where his boyish beard earned him the nickname "the goat". Aged 19, he was awarded the Médaille militaire and Croix de Guerre for his service as a volunteer ambulance driver with the Free French forces in Libya. Wounded in action at Bir Hakeim, he returned to the United States where he was drafted into the U.S. Army, serving as an intelligence officer in Europe. His time training at Camp Ritchie's Military Intelligence Training Center puts him among the ranks of nearly 20,000 Ritchie Boys.

== Career ==
=== Early work ===
Semple's writing career started in 1951, as a short story contributor to magazines such as The Saturday Evening Post and Collier's Weekly. Semple also tried writing for the theatre and had a play produced on Broadway, Tonight in Samarkand (1955), a melodrama adapted from the French.

He wrote an episode for The Alcoa Hour called "Archangel Harrigan" (1955).

He wrote another play, Golden Fleecing, which was filmed for Matinee Theatre in 1958 and premiered on Broadway in 1959.

Semple wrote "China Boy" for the TV series Buckskin (1958), "Four Against Three Millions" and "Money Go Round" for Target (1958), and "Epitaph for a Golden Girl" for Pursuit (1958). "Golden Fleecing" was bought by Metro-Goldwyn-Mayer and produced under the title The Honeymoon Machine (1961), starring Steve McQueen, following which Semple relocated to Hollywood and established himself as a writer for several television shows, including Kraft Suspense Theatre ("Knight's Gambit" 1964), Breaking Point ("Never Trouble Trouble Till Trouble Troubles You" 1964), The Rogues ("Death of a Fleming " 1964), Theatre of Stars ("The Fliers" 1965), Burke's Law (several episodes).

=== Batman ===
While living in Spain in 1965, Semple was approached by producer William Dozier to develop a television series for ABC based on the comic book Batman. Semple wrote a pilot which was promptly picked up, and the series based on it put on the air, with popular success. Semple wrote the first four episodes. Semple also served as Executive Story Editor.

At the same time he provided the screenplay for the 1966 Batman feature film version.

He also wrote one double episode of the television series The Green Hornet called "Beautiful Dreamer," which was broadcast in October 1966.

He co-wrote a TV movie Thompson's Ghost (1966) and did episodes of The Rat Patrol (1966) and wrote "You're Only Young Twice" for Vacation Playhouse (1967).

=== Film career ===
From the late 1960s onwards, Semple concentrated on films. With the success of the Batman film, he and director Leslie Martinson re-teamed on Fathom (1967), a spy spoof for Raquel Welch.

His script for the critically acclaimed cult film Pretty Poison (1968) won the award of the New York Film Critics Circle Awards as best screenplay of its year.

He rewrote Larry Cohen's script Daddy's Gone A-Hunting (1969), and wrote the little-seen The Sporting Club (1971). The Marriage of a Young Stockbroker (1971) was an attempt to match the success of The Graduate.

Semple was one of several writers on the box office hit Papillon (1973). He received writing credit on a series of thrillers: The Super Cops (1974), The Parallax View (1974), The Drowning Pool (1975) and Three Days of the Condor (1975).

=== Dino De Laurentiis ===
Three Days of the Condor had been produced by Dino De Laurentiis, who hired Semple repeatedly over the next few years. He wrote the popular but critically assailed King Kong remake (1976); Hurricane (1979), a major box office flop starring Mia Farrow, on which Semple is also credited as Executive Producer; and Flash Gordon (1980), again a comic strip derivative, done in a deliberately over-the-top style reminiscent of the "Batman" sensibility. As with his Batman, serious comic-strip devotees attacked Semple for the allegedly disrespectful approach he took to the printed originals.

After Never Say Never Again (1983), a non-Eon Productions film in the James Bond series which brought Sean Connery back to the role for the last time, Semple wrote a final comic book adaptation, Sheena (1984), based on the comic book Sheena, Queen of the Jungle.

He wrote a TV movie, Rearview Mirror (1984), and an Imperial war film that was never completed, The Bengal Lancers! (1984).

He was credited on Never Too Young to Die (1986) and the TV movie Rapture (1993).

=== Later career ===
Subsequently, Semple and retired agent and producer Marcia Nasatir reviewed movies on YouTube as the Reel Geezers.

In September 2008, he was hailed by the Writers Guild of America as a Living Legend. In 2010, the American Cinemateque presented a two-night retrospective of his movies in Santa Monica.

In January 2013, author Jon Dambacher dedicated his short novel "A Strange, Sickly Beauty" to him.

== Death ==
Semple died of natural causes on March 28, 2014, at his home in Los Angeles, California, one day after his 91st birthday. He was survived by his wife, three children, including writer Maria Semple, and six grandchildren.

== Filmography ==
=== Screenplays ===
- Batman (1966)
- Fathom (1967)
- Pretty Poison (1968)
- Daddy's Gone A-Hunting (with Larry Cohen) (1969)
- The Sporting Club (1971)
- The Marriage of a Young Stockbroker (1971)
- Papillon (with Dalton Trumbo) (1973)
- The Super Cops (1974)
- The Parallax View (with David Giler) (1974)
- The Drowning Pool (1975)
- Three Days of the Condor (with David Rayfiel) (1975)
- King Kong (1976)
- Hurricane (with Tracy Keenan Wynn and Walter Hill) (1979)
- Flash Gordon (with Michael Allin) (1980)
- Never Say Never Again (1983)
- Sheena (with David Newman) (1984)
- Never Too Young to Die (with Gil Bettman) (1986)

=== Television ===
- The Alcoa Hour (1955)
- Target (1958)
- Pursuit (1958)
- The Rogues (1964)
- Burke's Law (1964)
- Batman (1966)
- Thompson's Ghost (1966)
- The Rat Patrol (1966)
- The Green Hornet (1966)
- Rearview Mirror (1984)
- Rapture (1993)
