= In Country =

1989 film by Norman Jewison

- Theatrical release poster
- Directed by: Norman Jewison
- Screenplay by: Frank Pierson; Cynthia Cidre
- Based on: In Country by Bobbie Ann Mason
- Produced by: Norman Jewison; Richard N. Roth
- Starring: Bruce Willis; Emily Lloyd
- Cinematography: Russell Boyd
- Edited by: Antony Gibbs; Lou Lombardo
- Music by: James Horner
- Distributed by: Warner Bros.
- Release date: September 29, 1989
- Running time: 120 minutes
- Country: United States
- Language: English
- Budget: $18 million
- Box office: $3,531,971

In Country is a 1989 American drama film produced and directed by Norman Jewison, starring Bruce Willis and Emily Lloyd. The screenplay by Frank Pierson and Cynthia Cidre was based on the novel by Bobbie Ann Mason. The original music score was composed by James Horner. For his role, Willis earned a nomination for Best Supporting Actor at the 47th Golden Globe Awards.

== Plot ==
Recent high school graduate, 17-year-old Samantha Hughes lives with her Uncle Emmett, a Vietnam veteran with post-traumatic stress disorder, in Kentucky. Samantha's father, Dwayne, was killed in Vietnam after marrying her mother, Irene. Samantha finds some old photographs, medals and letters that belonged to her father and becomes obsessed with finding out more about him.

Though Irene wants Samantha to move in with her and her second husband and go to college, Samantha stays with Emmett to learn more about her father.

Samantha talks to other veterans and eventually reads her father's diary. She travels with Emmett to the Vietnam Veterans Memorial in Washington, D.C. where finding her father's name on the memorial wall at last gives Samantha some closure about his death.

== Cast ==
- Bruce Willis as Emmett Smith
- Emily Lloyd as Samantha Hughes
- Joan Allen as Irene
- Kevin Anderson as Lonnie
- John Terry as Tom
- Peggy Rea as Mamaw
- Judith Ivey as Anita
- Daniel Jenkins as Dwayne
- Stephen Tobolowsky as Pete
- Jim Beaver as Earl Smith
- Richard Hamilton as Grandpaw
- Heidi Swedberg as Dawn
- Ken Jenkins as Jim Holly
- Jonathan Hogan as Larry
- Patricia Richardson as Cindy

== Production ==
=== Casting ===
To prepare for her role, Emily Lloyd stayed with a lawyer and his family in Paducah, Kentucky. In order to get into the mindset of a girl whose father has died, the young actress thought of the death of her paternal grandfather, Charles Lloyd Pack, a British actor to whom she was very close. Lloyd underwent training to speak with a Kentucky accent in the film.

The veterans in the dance sequence are all actual Vietnam vets and their real family members accompany them. Of the five major characters who are Vietnam veterans, only one, Earl, is played by an actual Vietnam veteran, Jim Beaver. Ken Jenkins, who plays Jim Holly (the organizer of the veteran's dance), is the father of Daniel Jenkins, who plays Samantha's father Dwayne in the Vietnam flashbacks. Their casting in the film was purely coincidental. The commencement speaker was played by Don Young, the minister of a large Baptist church in Paducah, Kentucky. In an interview with The Paducah Sun, he said the speech had been written for him but joked that it was so good, he might "borrow" parts of it in future sermons.

=== Filming ===
Much of the film was shot in Kentucky's far-western Jackson Purchase, where the original author, Bobbie Ann Mason, grew up. Her home of Graves County, specifically its county seat of Mayfield, was the location for many scenes. The walk-in doctor's office seen in the film is actually a dry cleaners which was renamed "Clothes Doctor" following its appearance in the film. Several other scenes were shot in the Purchase's largest city of Paducah, particularly the scenes inside Emmett's home.

== Release ==
In Country had its world premiere on September 7, 1989, at the Toronto International Film Festival, which Bruce Willis attended and dedicated to Canadian war veterans who fought in Vietnam.

=== Box office performance ===
The film was given a limited release on September 15, 1989, in four theaters grossing $36,505 on its opening weekend. It was given a wide release on September 29, 1989, in 606 theaters grossing $1.3 million on its opening weekend. It went on to make $3.5 million in North America.

=== Critical reception ===
In Country was generally well received by critics. It has a 68% rating on Rotten Tomatoes based on 28 reviews. Audiences polled by CinemaScore gave the film an average grade of "B" on an A+ to F scale.

Film critic Roger Ebert gave the film three out of four stars and wrote, "The movie is like a time bomb. You sit there, interested, absorbed, sometimes amused, sometimes moved, but wondering in the back of your mind what all of this is going to add up to. Then you find out". In his review for The Globe and Mail, Rick Groen praised Emily Lloyd's performance: "Emily Lloyd, the callow Brit who burned up the screen in Wish You Were Here, is letter perfect – her accent impeccable and her energy immense". USA Today gave the film three out of four stars and praised Bruce Willis' "subsidiary performance as Lloyd's reclusive guardian-uncle is admirably short on showboating". In his review for The Guardian, Derek Malcolm praised Lloyd for her "portrait is of a lively waif who does not intend to be easily defeated by the comedy of life without adding a few jokes of her own, and it is the most complete thing she has so far done on the screen, good as she was in Wish You Were Here". Time magazine felt that the script "perhaps pursues too many banal and inconsequential matters as it portrays teen life in a small town", but that "the film starts to gather force and direction when a dance, organized to honor the local Viet vets, works out awkwardly". Furthermore, its critic felt that the film was "a lovely, necessary little stitch in our torn time".

In her review for The New York Times, Caryn James criticized the "cheap and easy touches ... that reduce it to the shallowness of a television movie", and found James Horner's score, "offensive and distracting". Newsweek magazine's David Ansen wrote, "While one can respect its lofty intentions, the movie doesn't seem to have any better sense than its high-school heroine of just what it's looking for. At once underdramatized and faintly stagy, it keeps promising revelations that never quite materialize". In her review for the Washington Post, Rita Kempley wrote, "What's meant to be a cohesive family portrait, a suffering American microcosm, is a shambles of threads dangling and characters adrift. Jewison leaves it to stymied viewers to figure out the gist of it". Peter Travers from the Rolling Stone magazine considered In Country as "one of the year’s most emotionally shattering films."
