= BAFTA Award for Best Original Screenplay =

British film industry award

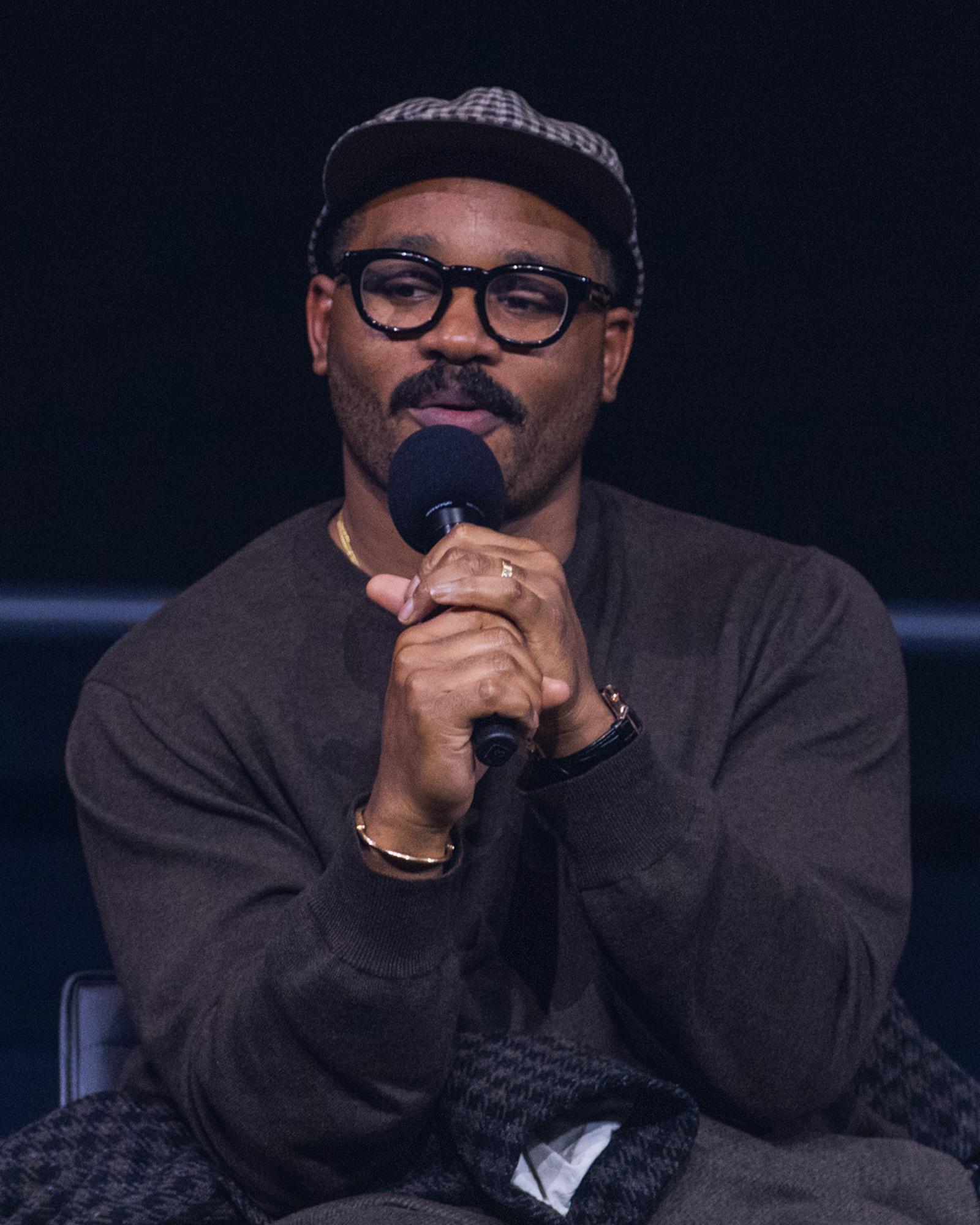
- The 2025 recipient: Ryan Coogler
- Awarded for: Best Original Screenplay
- Location: United Kingdom
- Presented by: British Academy of Film and Television Arts
- Currently held by: Ryan Coogler for Sinners (2025)
- Website: http://www.bafta.org/

The BAFTA Award for Best Original Screenplay is a British Academy Film Award presented annually by the British Academy of Film and Television Arts (BAFTA) to a screenwriter for a specific film.

The British Academy of Film and Television Arts (BAFTA) is a British organisation that hosts annual awards shows for film, television, and video games (and formerly also for children's film and television). Since 1983, selected films have been awarded with the BAFTA Award for Best Adapted Screenplay at an annual ceremony.

In the following lists, the titles and names in bold with a gold background are the winners and recipients respectively; those not in bold are the remaining nominees. The winner is also the first name listed in each category.

== History ==
The British Academy of Film and Television Arts (BAFTA) award for Best Original Screenplay has been presented to its winners since 1984, when the original category (BAFTA Award for Best Screenplay) was split into two awards, the other being the BAFTA Award for Best Adapted Screenplay and Best Original Screenplay.

Woody Allen holds the record for the most wins with four awards.

== Winners and nominees ==
indicates the winner

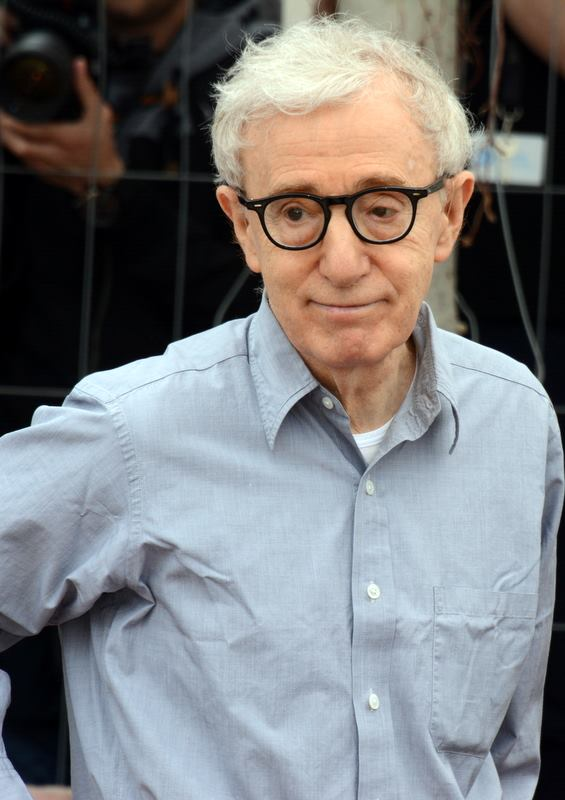
Woody Allen won four times for Broadway Danny Rose (1984), The Purple Rose of Cairo (1985), Hannah and Her Sisters (1986), and Husbands and Wives (1992)

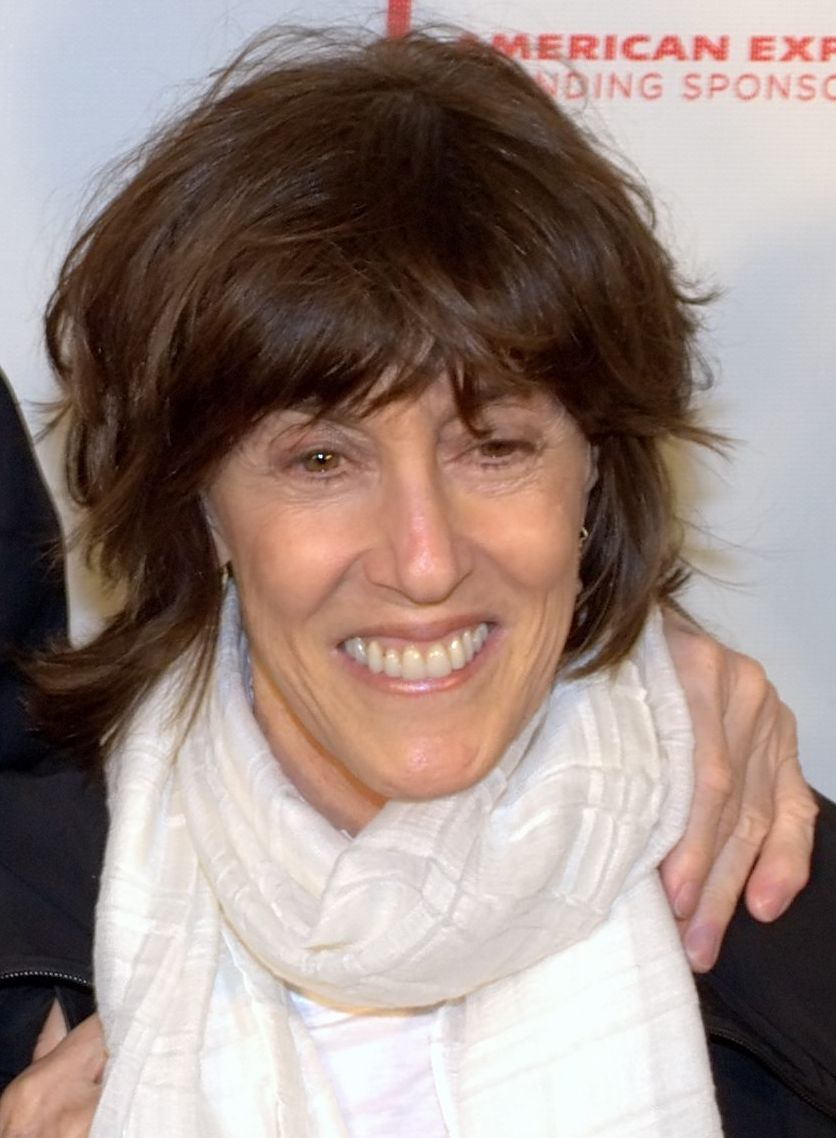
Nora Ephron won for When Harry Met Sally... (1989)

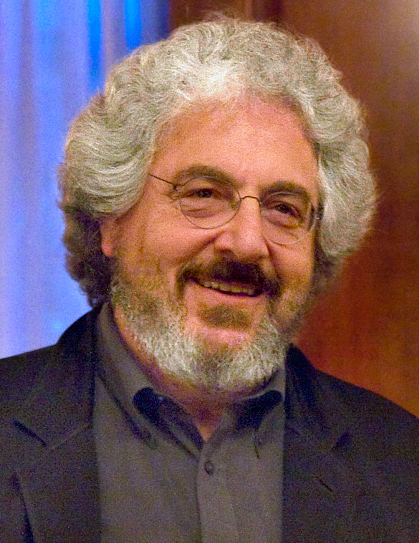
Harold Ramis won for Groundhog Day (1993)

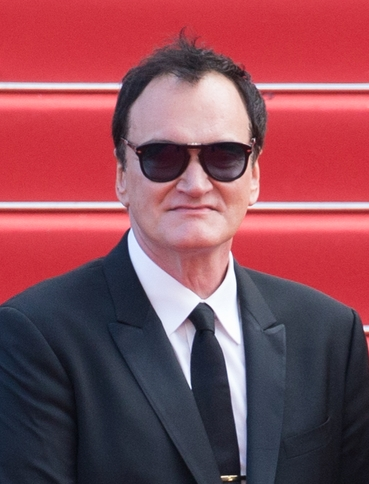
Quentin Tarantino won twice for Pulp Fiction (1994) and Django Unchained (2013)

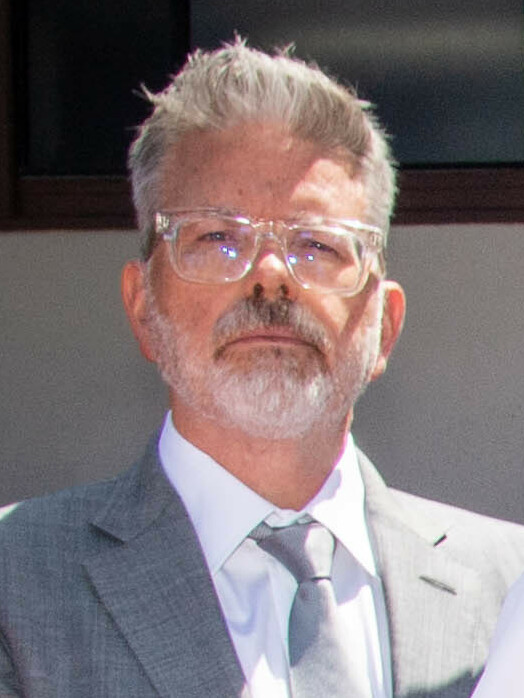
Christopher McQuarrie won for The Usual Suspects (1995)

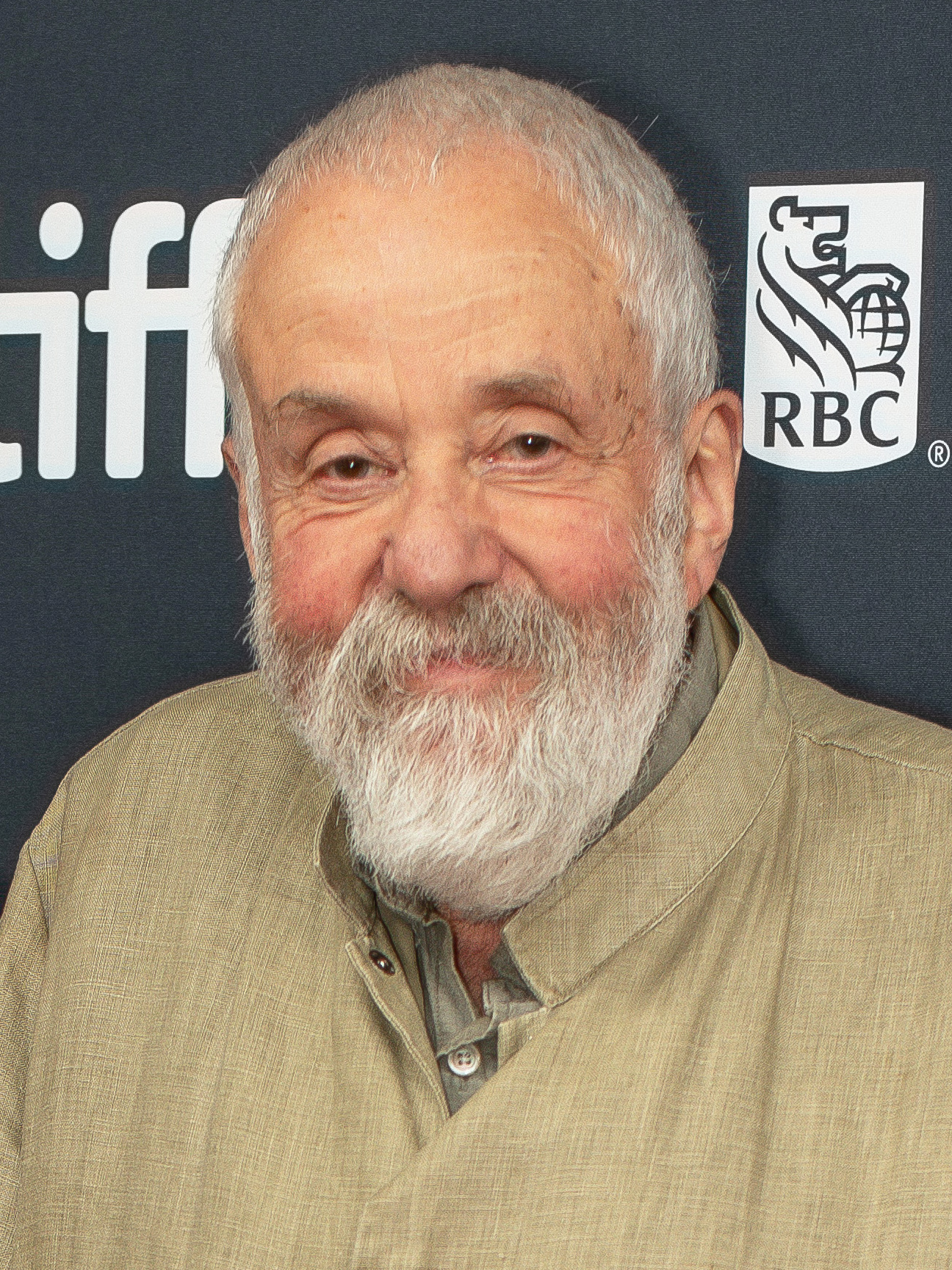
Mike Leigh won for Secrets & Lies (1996)

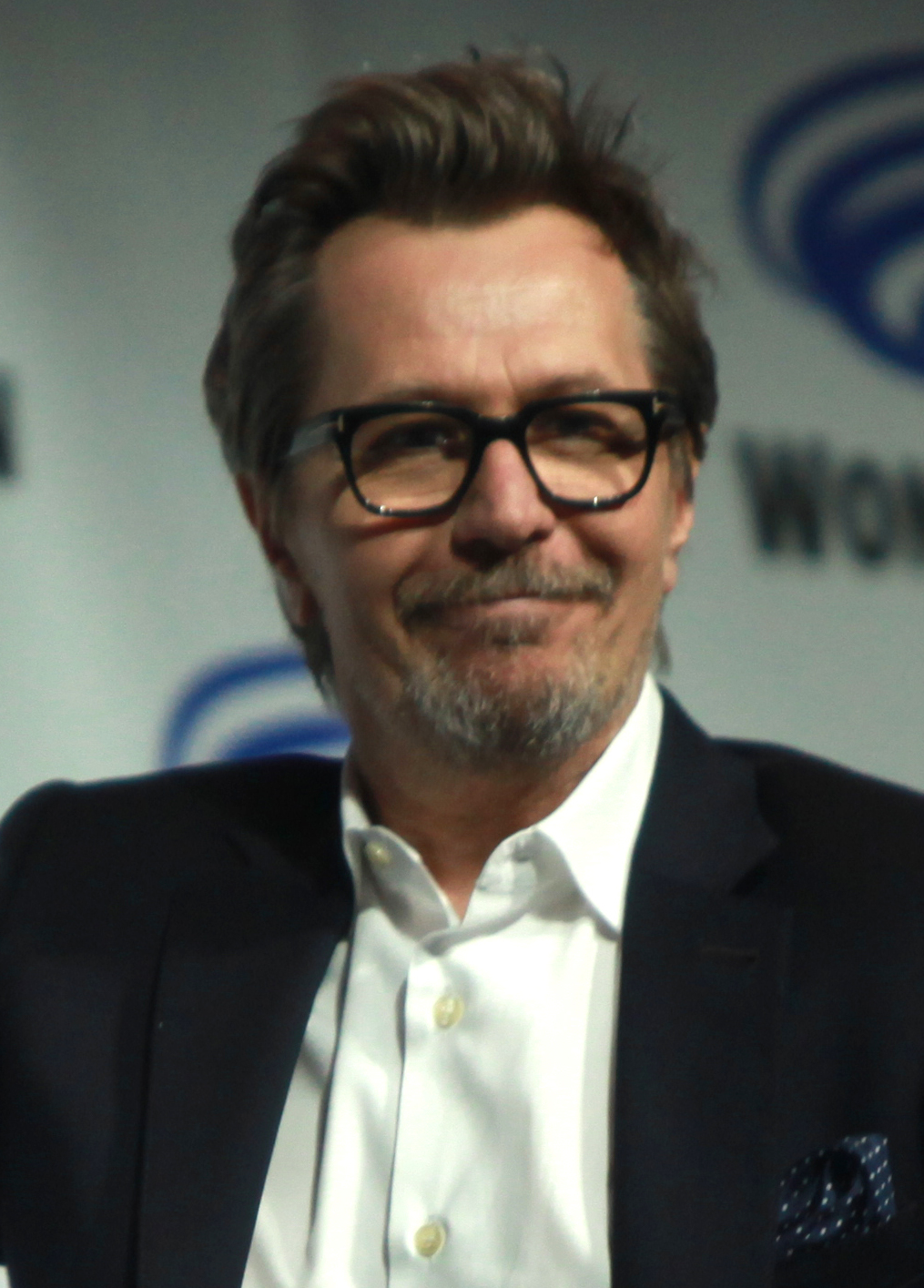
Gary Oldman won for Nil by Mouth (1997)

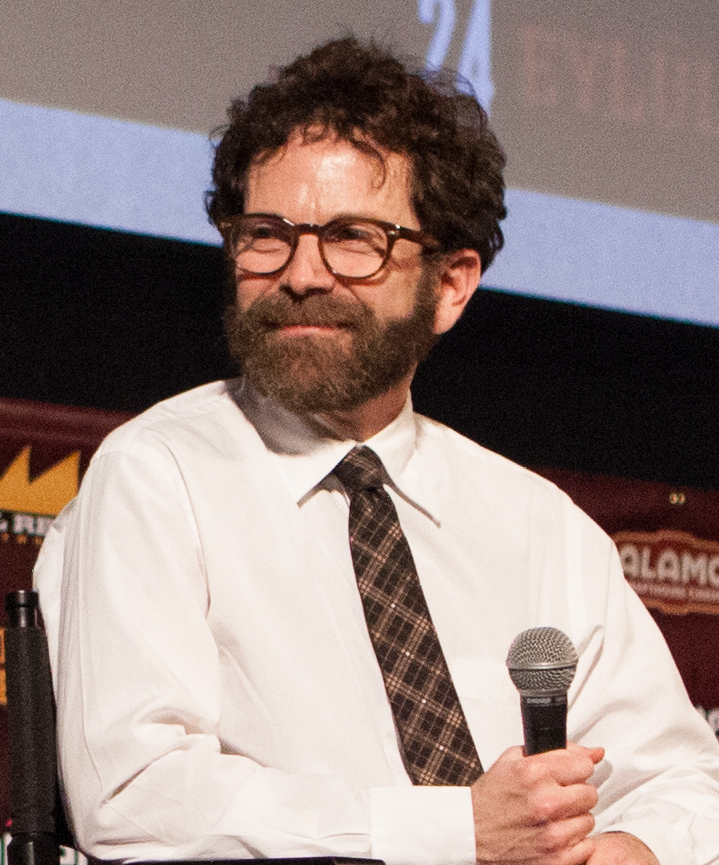
Charlie Kaufman won twice for Being John Malkovich (1999) and Eternal Sunshine of the Spotless Mind (2004)

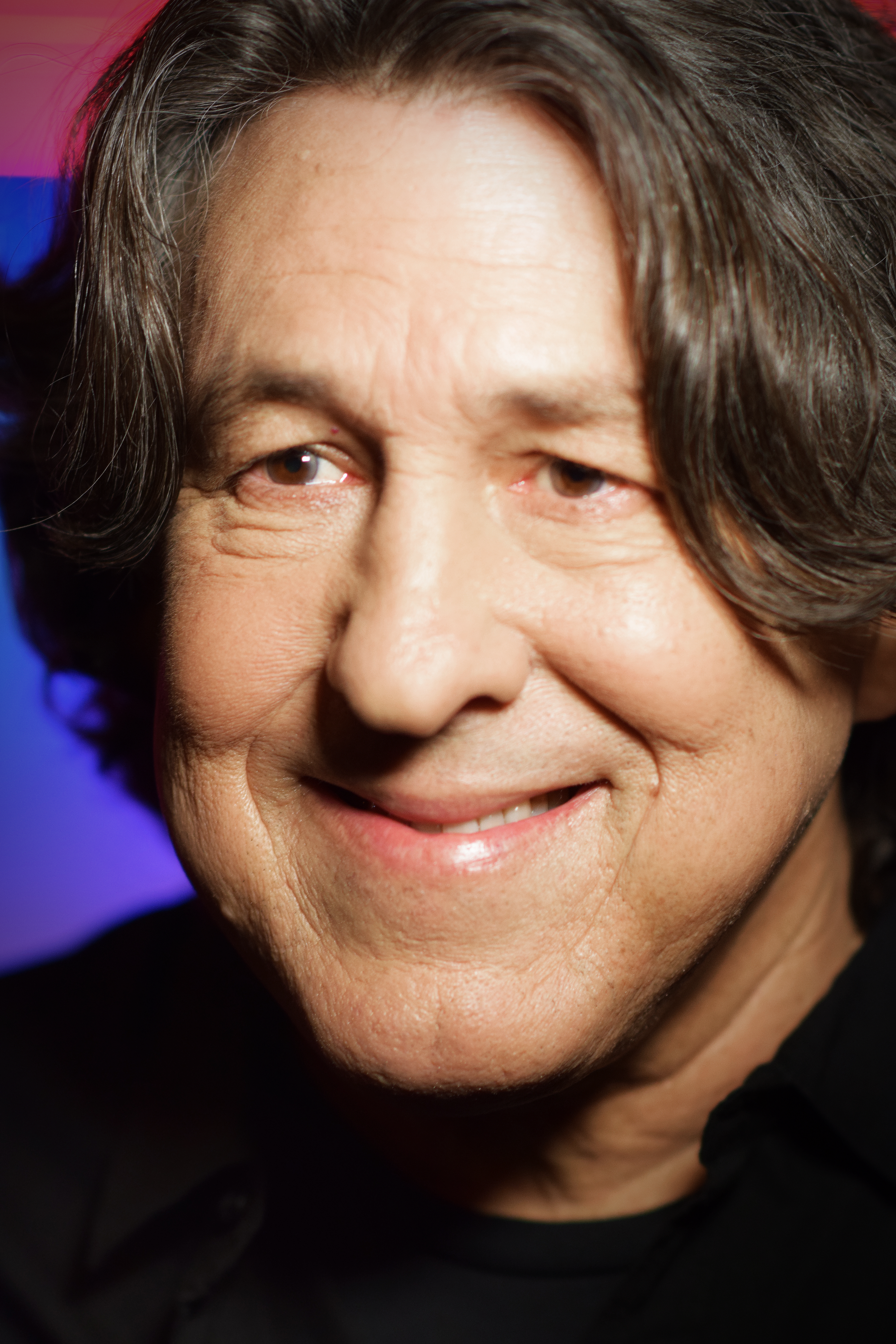
Cameron Crowe won for Almost Famous (2000)

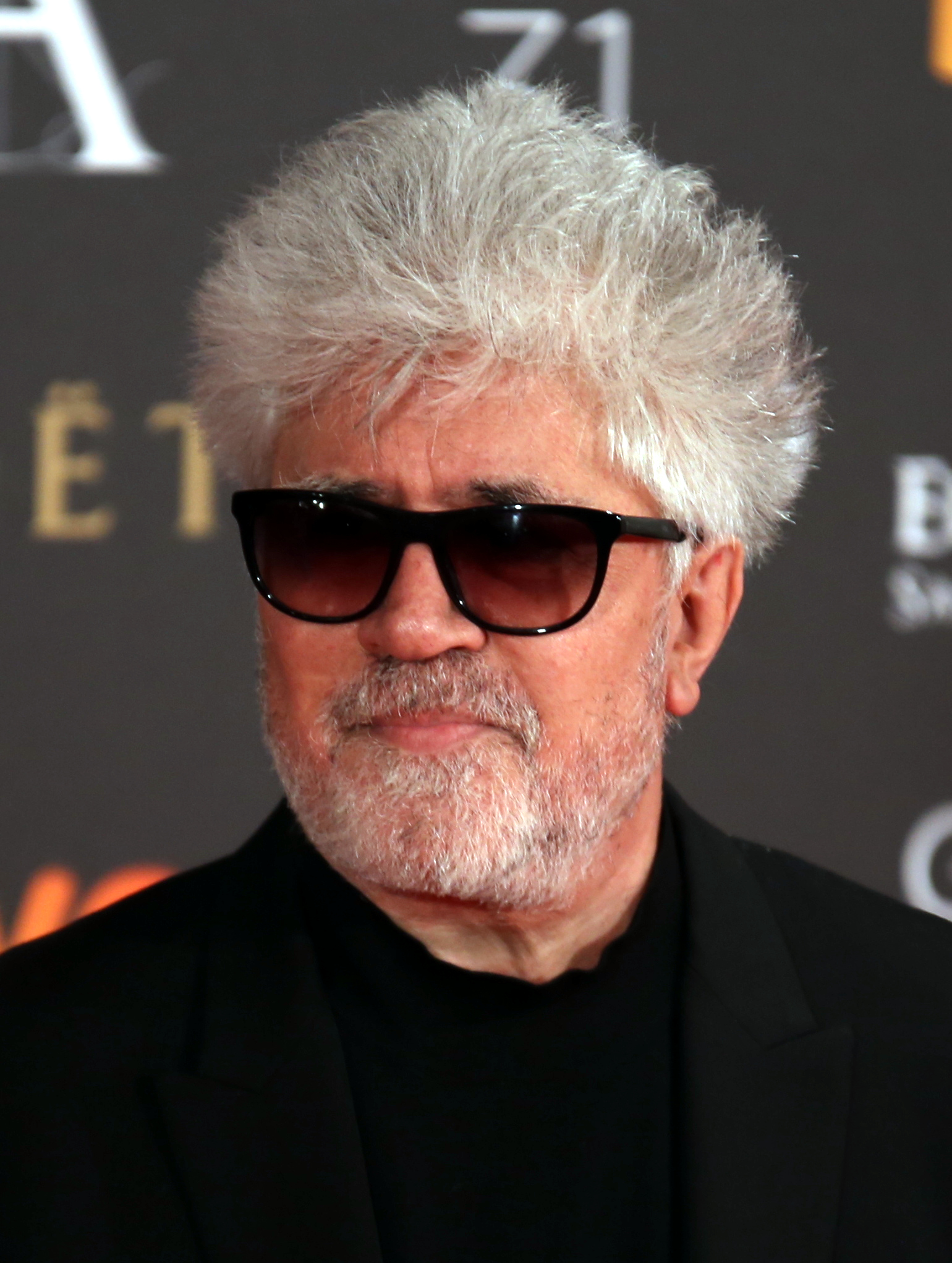
Pedro Almodóvar won for Talk to Her (2002)

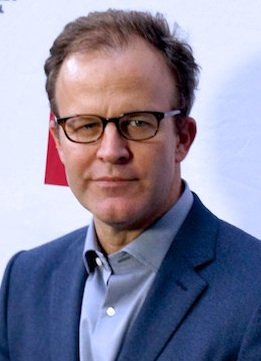
Tom McCarthy won twice for The Station Agent (2003) and Spotlight (2015)

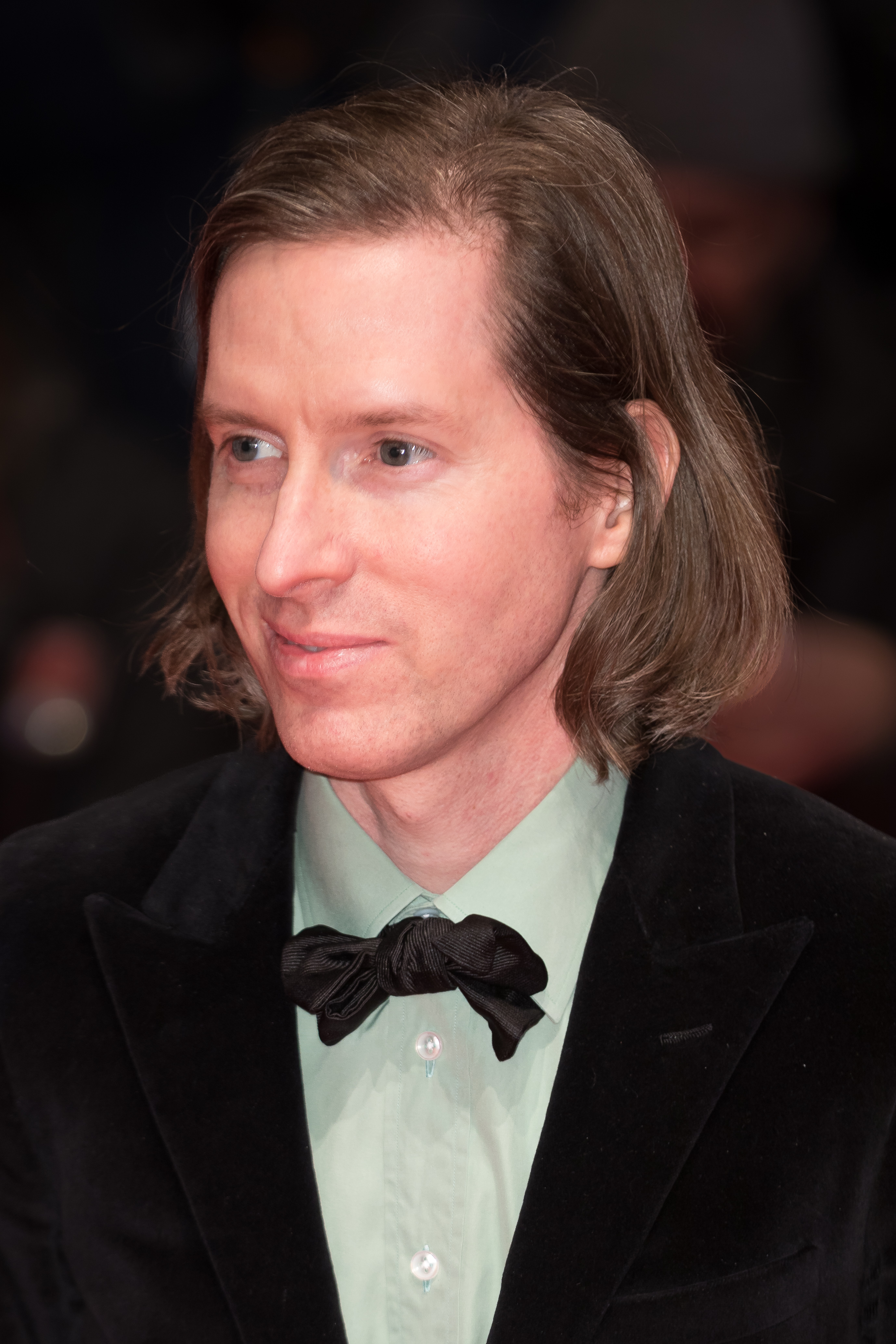
Wes Anderson won for The Grand Budapest Hotel (2014)

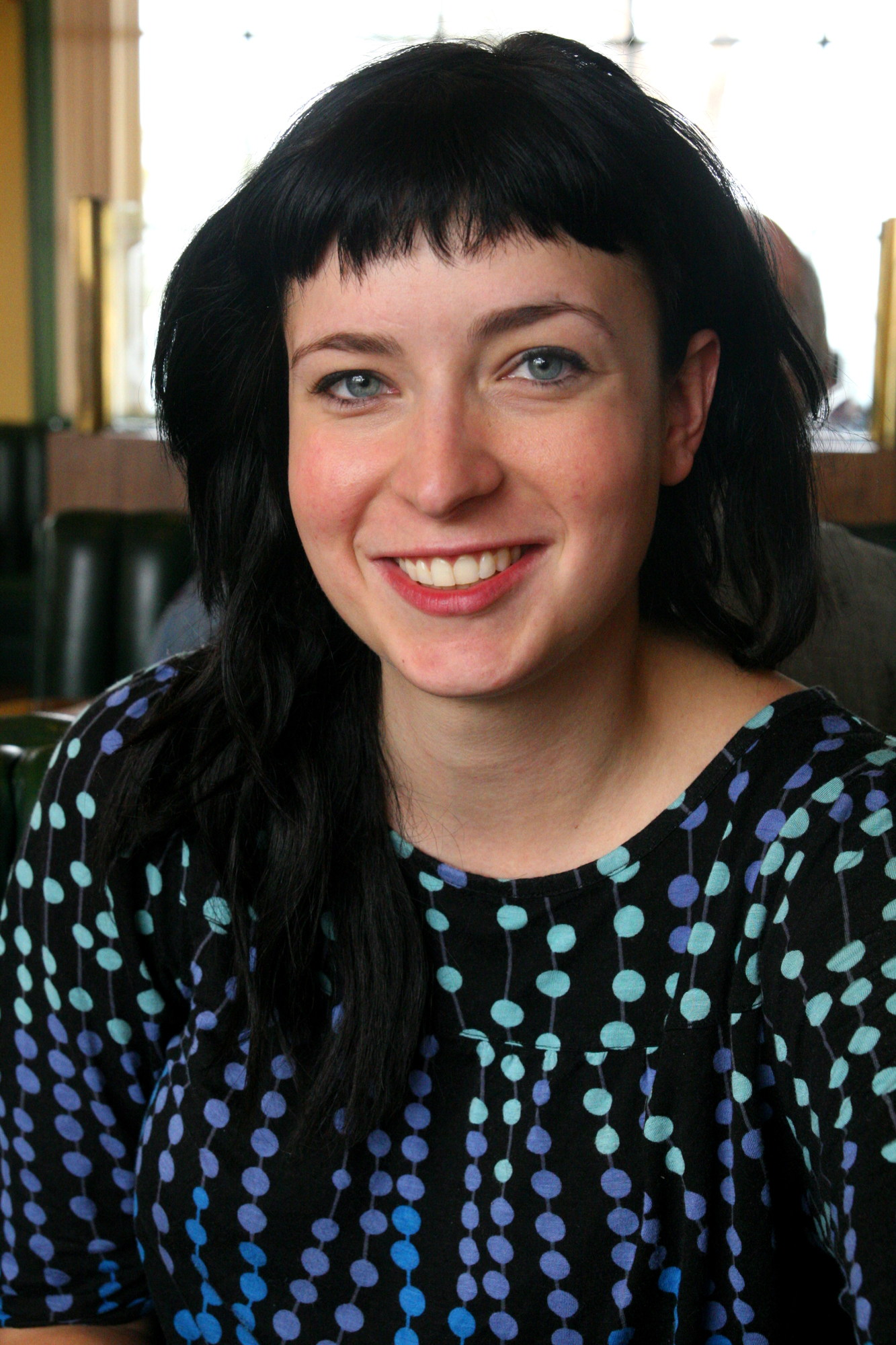
Diablo Cody won for Juno (2007)

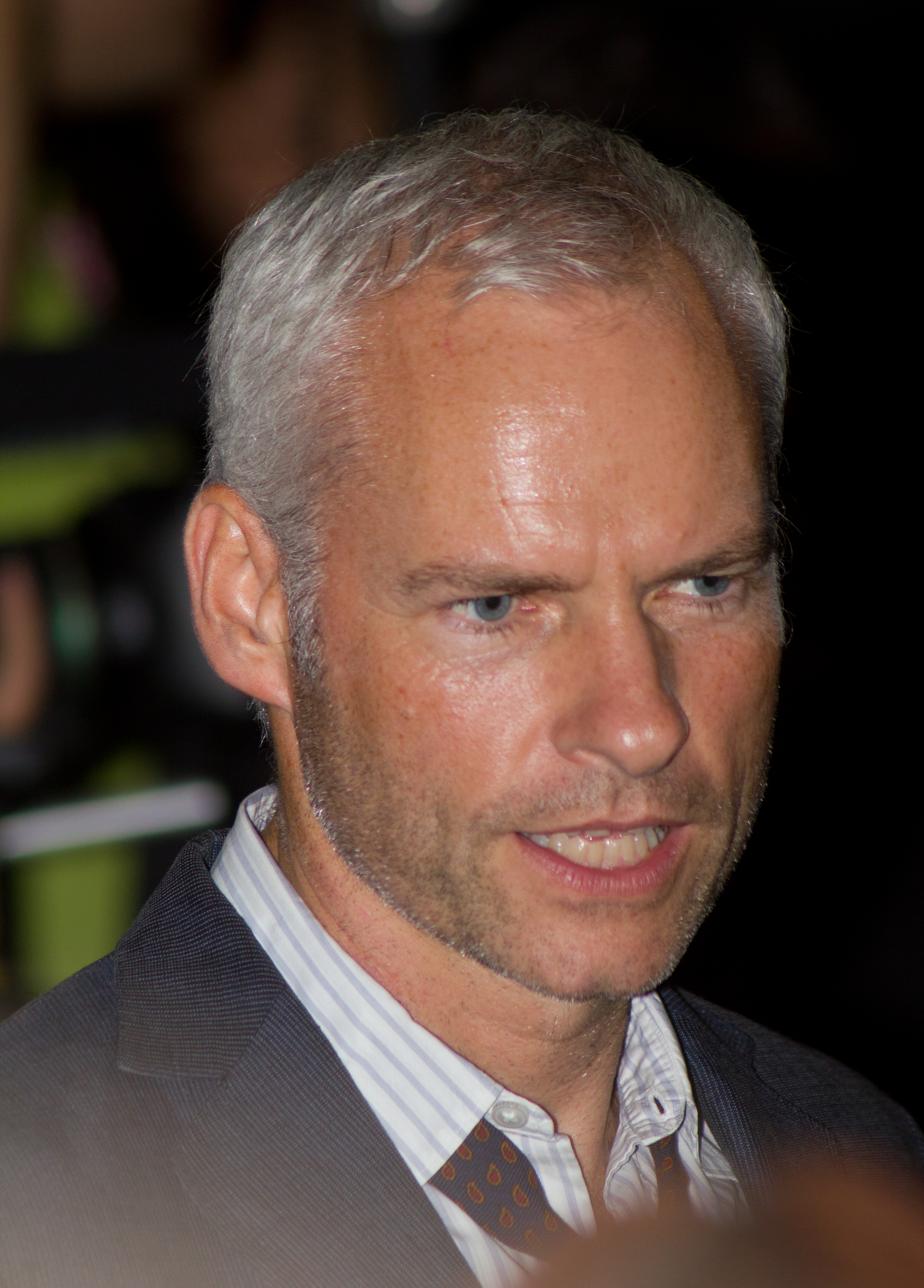
Martin McDonagh won thrice for In Bruges (2008), Three Billboards Outside Ebbing, Missouri (2017), and The Banshees of Inisherin (2022)

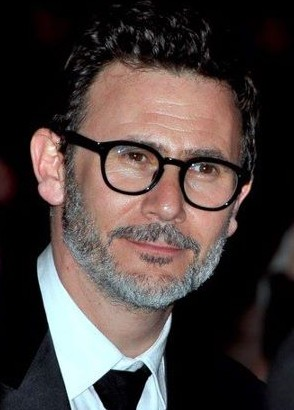
Michel Hazanavicius won for The Artist (2011)

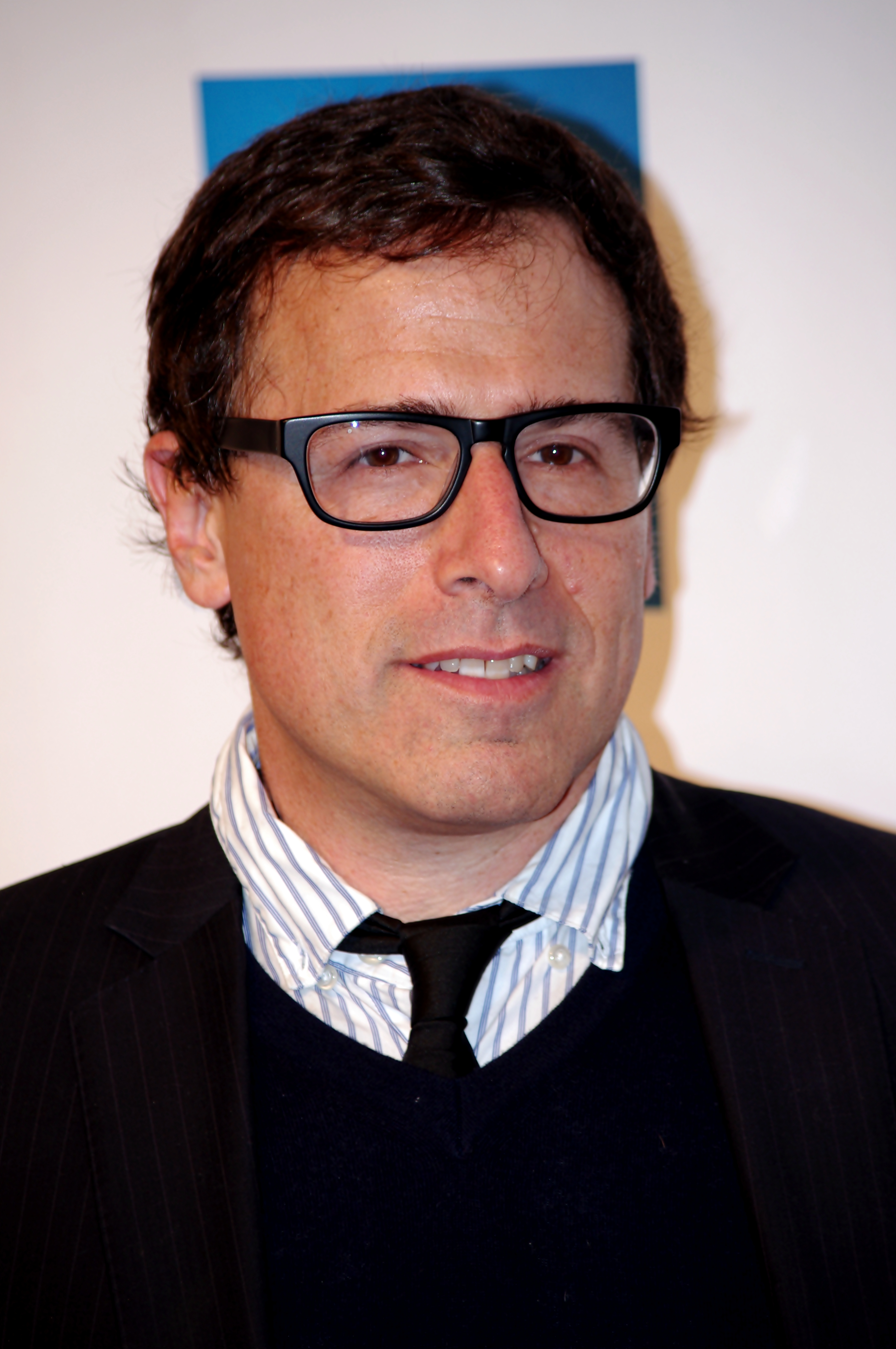
David O. Russell won for American Hustle (2013)

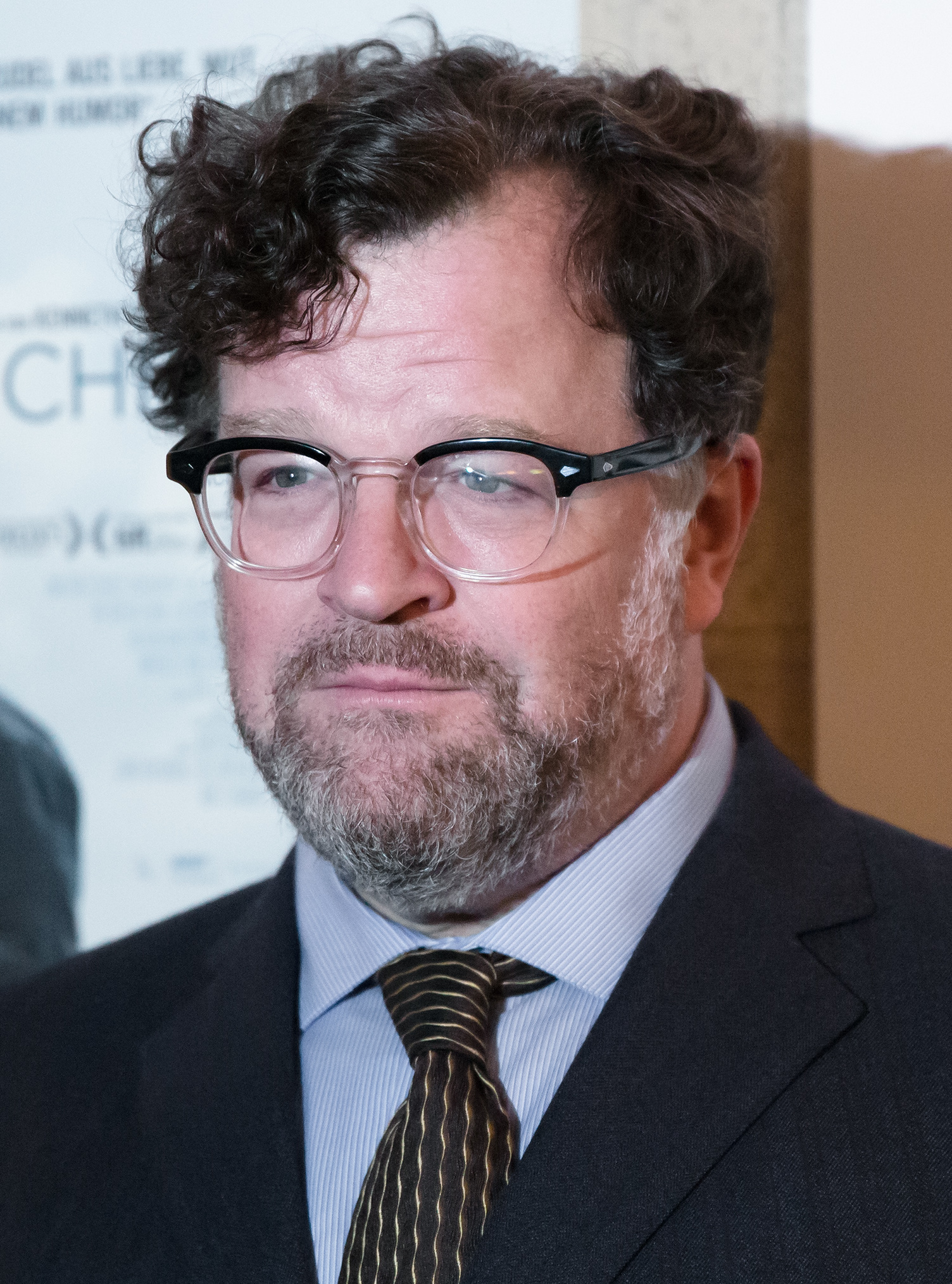
Kenneth Lonergan won for Manchester by the Sea (2016)

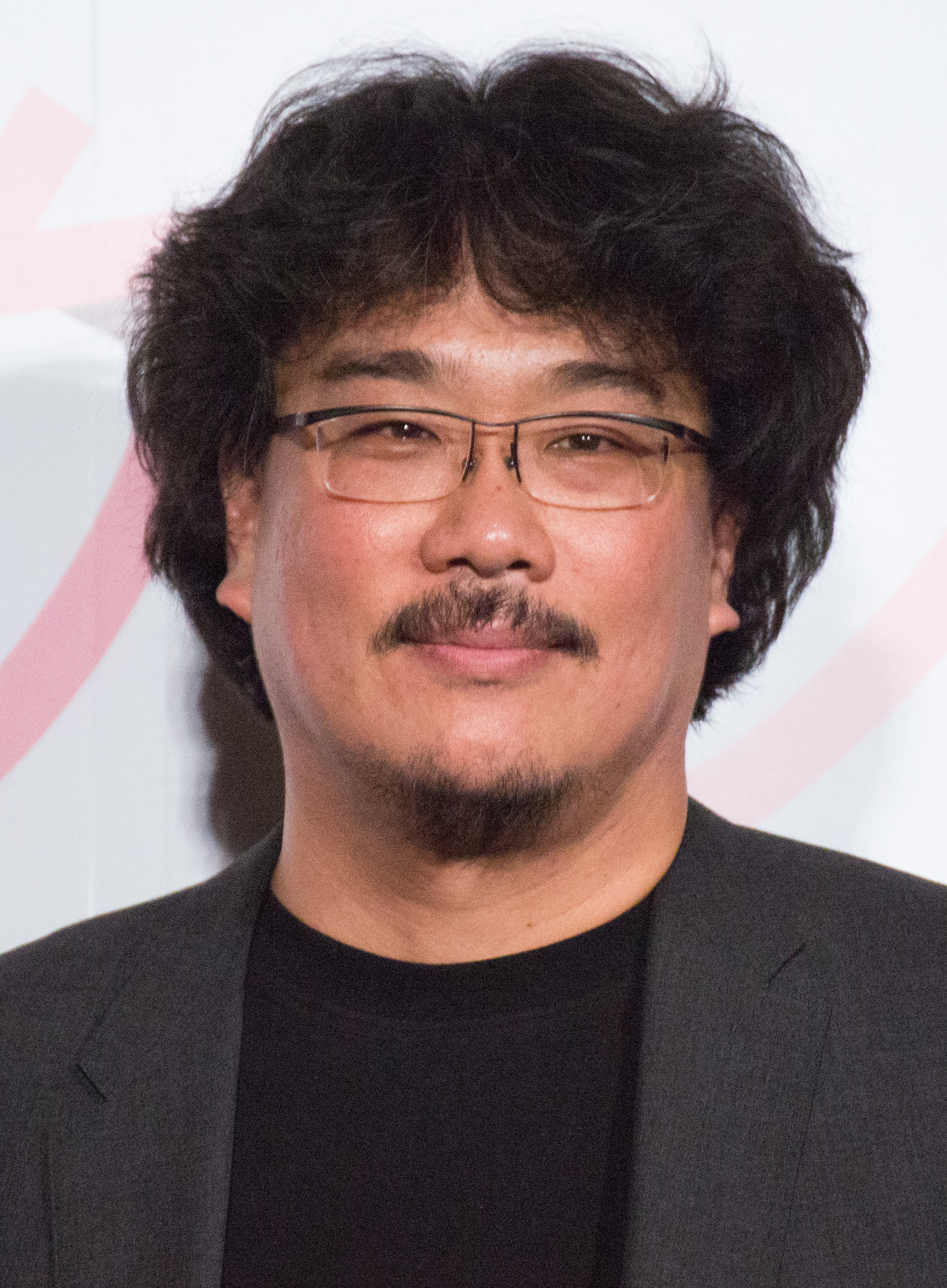
Bong Joon-ho won for Parasite (2019)

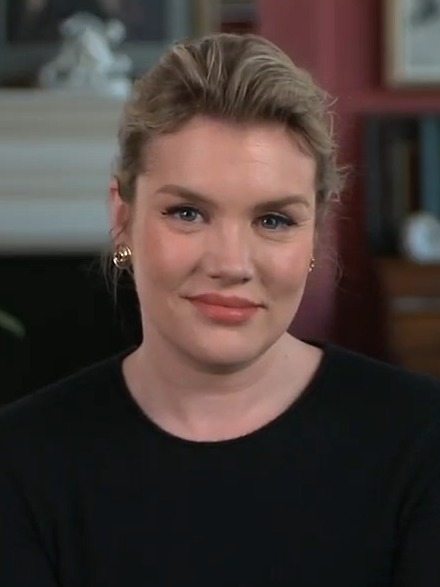
Emerald Fennell won for Promising Young Woman (2020)

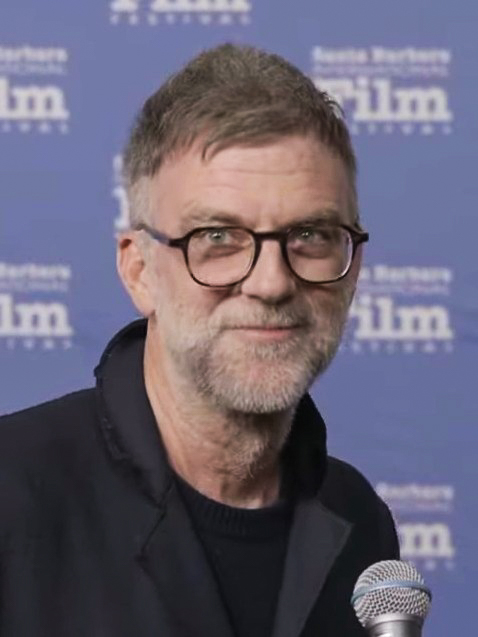
Paul Thomas Anderson won for Licorice Pizza (2021)

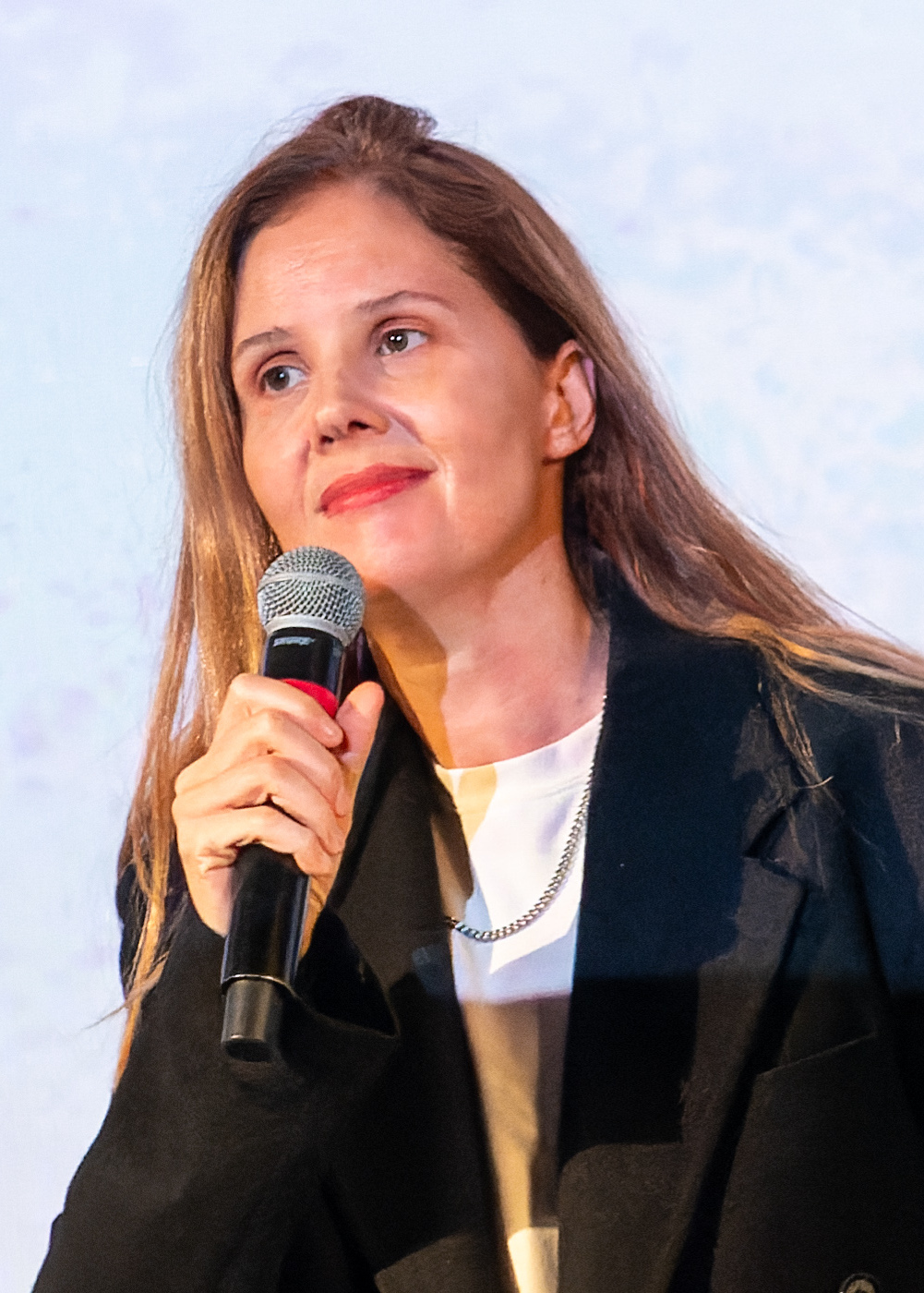
Justine Triet won for Anatomy of a Fall (2023)

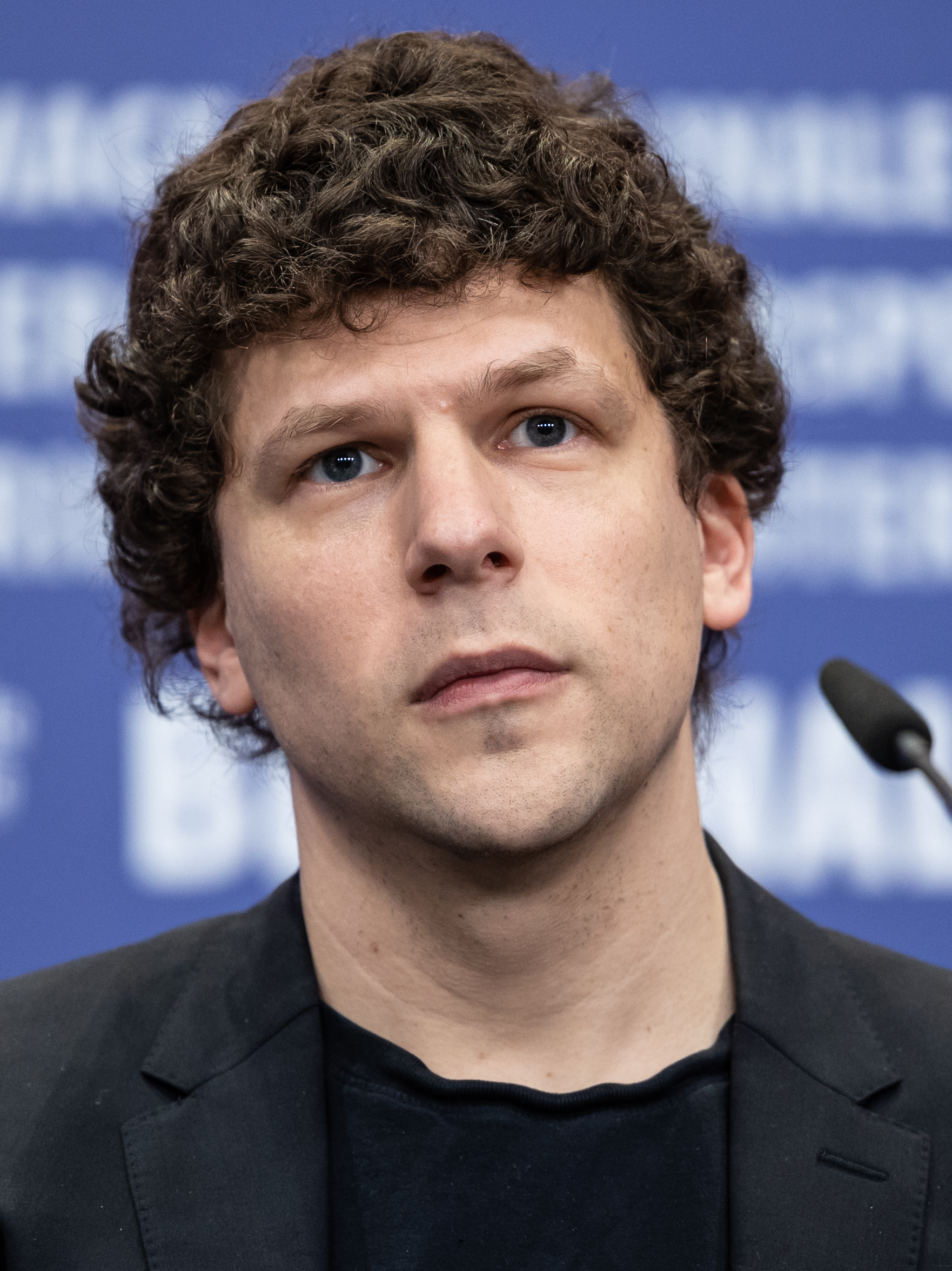
Jesse Eisenberg won for A Real Pain (2024)

=== 1980s ===
Year	Film	Screenwriter(s)	Ref.
**1983** (37th)	**The King of Comedy**	**Paul D. Zimmerman**	
**1983** (37th)	Local Hero	Bill Forsyth	
**1983** (37th)	Trading Places	Timothy Harris and Herschel Weingrod	
**1983** (37th)	Zelig	Woody Allen	
**1984** (38th)	**Broadway Danny Rose**	**Woody Allen**	
**1984** (38th)	The Big Chill	Barbara Benedek and Lawrence Kasdan	
**1984** (38th)	Comfort and Joy	Bill Forsyth	
**1984** (38th)	A Private Function	Alan Bennett	
**1985** (39th)	**The Purple Rose of Cairo**	**Woody Allen**	
**1985** (39th)	Back to the Future	Robert Zemeckis and Bob Gale	
**1985** (39th)	My Beautiful Laundrette	Hanif Kureishi	
**1985** (39th)	Witness †	William Kelley and Earl W. Wallace	
**1986** (40th)	**Hannah and Her Sisters** †	**Woody Allen**	
**1986** (40th)	Crocodile Dundee	John Cornell, Paul Hogan and Ken Shadie	
**1986** (40th)	The Mission	Robert Bolt	
**1986** (40th)	Mona Lisa	Neil Jordan and David Leland	
**1987** (41st)	**Wish You Were Here**	**David Leland**	
**1987** (41st)	Hope and Glory	John Boorman	
**1987** (41st)	Personal Services	David Leland	
**1987** (41st)	Radio Days	Woody Allen	
**1988** (42nd)	**A World Apart**	**Shawn Slovo**	
**1988** (42nd)	Au revoir les enfants	Louis Malle	
**1988** (42nd)	A Fish Called Wanda	John Cleese	
**1988** (42nd)	Moonstruck †	John Patrick Shanley	
**1989** (43rd)	**When Harry Met Sally...**	**Nora Ephron**	
**1989** (43rd)	Dead Poets Society †	Tom Schulman	
**1989** (43rd)	Rain Man †	Ronald Bass and Barry Morrow	
**1989** (43rd)	Sex, Lies and Videotape	Steven Soderbergh	

=== 1990s ===
Year	Film	Screenwriter(s)	Ref.
**1990** (44th)	**Cinema Paradiso**	**Giuseppe Tornatore**	
**1990** (44th)	Crimes and Misdemeanors	Woody Allen	
**1990** (44th)	Ghost †	Bruce Joel Rubin	
**1990** (44th)	Pretty Woman	J. F. Lawton	
**1991** (45th)	**Truly, Madly, Deeply**	**Anthony Minghella**	
**1991** (45th)	The Fisher King	Richard LaGravenese	
**1991** (45th)	Green Card	Peter Weir	
**1991** (45th)	Thelma & Louise †	Callie Khouri	
**1992** (46th)	**Husbands and Wives**	**Woody Allen**	
**1992** (46th)	The Crying Game †	Neil Jordan	
**1992** (46th)	Hear My Song	Peter Chelsom and Adrian Dunbar	
**1992** (46th)	Unforgiven	David Webb Peoples	
**1993** (47th)	**Groundhog Day**	**Harold Ramis and Danny Rubin**	
**1993** (47th)	In the Line of Fire	Jeff Maguire	
**1993** (47th)	The Piano †	Jane Campion	
**1993** (47th)	Sleepless in Seattle	Jeff Arch, Nora Ephron and David S. Ward	
**1994** (48th)	**Pulp Fiction** †	**Quentin Tarantino and Roger Avary**	
**1994** (48th)	The Adventures of Priscilla, Queen of the Desert	Stephan Elliott	
**1994** (48th)	Four Weddings and a Funeral	Richard Curtis	
**1994** (48th)	Philadelphia	Ron Nyswaner	
**1994** (48th)	Three Colours: Red	Krzysztof Piesiewicz and Krzysztof Kieślowski	
**1995** (49th)	**The Usual Suspects** †	**Christopher McQuarrie**	
**1995** (49th)	Bullets over Broadway	Woody Allen and Douglas McGrath	
**1995** (49th)	Muriel's Wedding	P. J. Hogan	
**1995** (49th)	Se7en	Andrew Kevin Walker	
**1996** (50th)	**Secrets & Lies**	**Mike Leigh**	
**1996** (50th)	Brassed Off	Mark Herman	
**1996** (50th)	Fargo †	Joel Coen and Ethan Coen	
**1996** (50th)	Lone Star	John Sayles	
**1996** (50th)	Shine	Jan Sardi	
**1997** (51st)	**Nil by Mouth**	**Gary Oldman**	
**1997** (51st)	Boogie Nights	Paul Thomas Anderson	
**1997** (51st)	The Full Monty	Simon Beaufoy	
**1997** (51st)	Mrs Brown	Jeremy Brock	
**1998** (52nd)	**The Truman Show**	**Andrew Niccol**	
**1998** (52nd)	Elizabeth	Michael Hirst	
**1998** (52nd)	Life Is Beautiful	Roberto Benigni and Vincenzo Cerami	
**1998** (52nd)	Shakespeare in Love †	Marc Norman and Tom Stoppard	
**1999** (53rd)	**Being John Malkovich**	**Charlie Kaufman**	
**1999** (53rd)	All About My Mother	Pedro Almodóvar	
**1999** (53rd)	American Beauty †	Alan Ball	
**1999** (53rd)	The Sixth Sense	M. Night Shyamalan	
**1999** (53rd)	Topsy-Turvy	Mike Leigh	

=== 2000s ===
Year	Film	Screenwriter(s)	Ref.
**2000** (54th)	**Almost Famous** †	**Cameron Crowe**	
**2000** (54th)	Billy Elliot	Lee Hall	
**2000** (54th)	Erin Brockovich	Susannah Grant	
**2000** (54th)	Gladiator	David Franzoni, John Logan and William Nicholson	
**2000** (54th)	O Brother, Where Art Thou?	Joel Coen and Ethan Coen	
**2001** (55th)	**Amélie**	**Jean-Pierre Jeunet and Guillaume Laurant**	
**2001** (55th)	Gosford Park †	Julian Fellowes	
**2001** (55th)	Moulin Rouge!	Baz Luhrmann and Craig Pearce	
**2001** (55th)	The Others	Alejandro Amenábar	
**2001** (55th)	The Royal Tenenbaums	Wes Anderson and Owen Wilson	
**2002** (56th)	**Talk to Her** †	**Pedro Almodóvar**	
**2002** (56th)	Y tu mamá también	Alfonso Cuarón and Carlos Cuarón	
**2002** (56th)	Dirty Pretty Things	Steven Knight	
**2002** (56th)	Gangs of New York	Jay Cocks, Steven Zaillian and Kenneth Lonergan	
**2002** (56th)	The Magdalene Sisters	Peter Mullan	
**2003** (57th)	**The Station Agent**	**Tom McCarthy**	
**2003** (57th)	21 Grams	Guillermo Arriaga	
**2003** (57th)	The Barbarian Invasions	Denys Arcand	
**2003** (57th)	Finding Nemo	Bob Peterson, David Reynolds and Andrew Stanton	
**2003** (57th)	Lost in Translation †	Sofia Coppola	
**2004** (58th)	**Eternal Sunshine of the Spotless Mind** †	**Charlie Kaufman**	
**2004** (58th)	The Aviator	John Logan	
**2004** (58th)	Collateral	Stuart Beattie	
**2004** (58th)	Ray	James L. White	
**2004** (58th)	Vera Drake	Mike Leigh	
**2005** (59th)	**Crash** †	**Paul Haggis and Bobby Moresco**	
**2005** (59th)	Cinderella Man	Akiva Goldsman and Cliff Hollingsworth	
**2005** (59th)	Good Night and Good Luck	George Clooney and Grant Heslov	
**2005** (59th)	Hotel Rwanda	Terry George and Keir Pearson	
**2005** (59th)	Mrs Henderson Presents	Martin Sherman	
**2006** (60th)	**Little Miss Sunshine** †	**Michael Arndt**	
**2006** (60th)	Babel	Guillermo Arriaga	
**2006** (60th)	Pan's Labyrinth	Guillermo del Toro	
**2006** (60th)	The Queen	Peter Morgan	
**2006** (60th)	United 93	Paul Greengrass	
**2007** (61st)	**Juno** †	**Diablo Cody**	
**2007** (61st)	American Gangster	Steven Zaillian	
**2007** (61st)	The Lives of Others	Florian Henckel von Donnersmarck	
**2007** (61st)	Michael Clayton	Tony Gilroy	
**2007** (61st)	This Is England	Shane Meadows	
**2008** (62nd)	**In Bruges**	**Martin McDonagh**	
**2008** (62nd)	Burn After Reading	Joel Coen and Ethan Coen	
**2008** (62nd)	Changeling	J. Michael Straczynski	
**2008** (62nd)	I've Loved You So Long	Philippe Claudel	
**2008** (62nd)	Milk †	Dustin Lance Black	
**2009** (63rd)	**The Hurt Locker** †	**Mark Boal**	
**2009** (63rd)	The Hangover	Jon Lucas and Scott Moore	
**2009** (63rd)	Inglourious Basterds	Quentin Tarantino	
**2009** (63rd)	A Serious Man	Joel Coen and Ethan Coen	
**2009** (63rd)	Up	Pete Docter and Bob Peterson	

=== 2010s ===
Year	Film	Screenwriter(s)	Ref.
**2010** (64th)	**The King's Speech** †	**David Seidler**	
**2010** (64th)	Black Swan	Mark Heyman, Andres Heinz and John McLaughlin	
**2010** (64th)	The Fighter	Scott Silver, Paul Tamasy and Eric Johnson	
**2010** (64th)	Inception	Christopher Nolan	
**2010** (64th)	The Kids Are All Right	Lisa Cholodenko and Stuart Blumberg	
**2011** (65th)	**The Artist**	**Michel Hazanavicius**	
**2011** (65th)	Bridesmaids	Kristen Wiig and Annie Mumolo	
**2011** (65th)	The Guard	John Michael McDonagh	
**2011** (65th)	The Iron Lady	Abi Morgan	
**2011** (65th)	Midnight in Paris †	Woody Allen	
**2012** (66th)	**Django Unchained** †	**Quentin Tarantino**	
**2012** (66th)	Amour	Michael Haneke	
**2012** (66th)	The Master	Paul Thomas Anderson	
**2012** (66th)	Moonrise Kingdom	Wes Anderson and Roman Coppola	
**2012** (66th)	Zero Dark Thirty	Mark Boal	
**2013** (67th)	**American Hustle**	**Eric Warren Singer and David O. Russell**	
**2013** (67th)	Blue Jasmine	Woody Allen	
**2013** (67th)	Gravity	Alfonso Cuarón and Jonás Cuarón	
**2013** (67th)	Inside Llewyn Davis	Joel Coen and Ethan Coen	
**2013** (67th)	Nebraska	Bob Nelson	
**2014** (68th)	**The Grand Budapest Hotel**	**Wes Anderson and Hugo Guinness**	
**2014** (68th)	Birdman or (The Unexpected Virtue of Ignorance) †	Alejandro G. Iñárritu, Nicolás Giacobone, Alexander Dinelaris Jr. and Armando Bo	
**2014** (68th)	Boyhood	Richard Linklater	
**2014** (68th)	Nightcrawler	Dan Gilroy	
**2014** (68th)	Whiplash	Damien Chazelle	
**2015** (69th)	**Spotlight** †	**Tom McCarthy and Josh Singer**	
**2015** (69th)	Bridge of Spies	Matt Charman, Joel Coen and Ethan Coen	
**2015** (69th)	Ex Machina	Alex Garland	
**2015** (69th)	The Hateful Eight	Quentin Tarantino	
**2015** (69th)	Inside Out	Pete Docter, Josh Cooley and Meg LeFauve	
**2016** (70th)	**Manchester by the Sea** †	**Kenneth Lonergan**	
**2016** (70th)	Hell or High Water	Taylor Sheridan	
**2016** (70th)	I, Daniel Blake	Paul Laverty	
**2016** (70th)	La La Land	Damien Chazelle	
**2016** (70th)	Moonlight ‡	Barry Jenkins	
**2017** (71st)	**Three Billboards Outside Ebbing, Missouri**	**Martin McDonagh**	
**2017** (71st)	Get Out †	Jordan Peele	
**2017** (71st)	I, Tonya	Steven Rogers	
**2017** (71st)	Lady Bird	Greta Gerwig	
**2017** (71st)	The Shape of Water	Guillermo del Toro and Vanessa Taylor	
**2018** (72nd)	**The Favourite**	**Deborah Davis and Tony McNamara**	
**2018** (72nd)	Cold War	Paweł Pawlikowski and Janusz Głowacki	
**2018** (72nd)	Green Book †	Nick Vallelonga, Brian Hayes Currie and Peter Farrelly	
**2018** (72nd)	Roma	Alfonso Cuarón	
**2018** (72nd)	Vice	Adam McKay	
**2019** (73rd)	**Parasite** †	**Han Jin Won and Bong Joon-ho**	
**2019** (73rd)	Booksmart	Susanna Fogel, Emily Halpern, Sarah Haskins and Katie Silberman	
**2019** (73rd)	Marriage Story	Noah Baumbach	
**2019** (73rd)	Knives Out	Rian Johnson	
**2019** (73rd)	Once Upon a Time in Hollywood	Quentin Tarantino	

=== 2020s ===
Year	Film	Screenwriter(s)	Ref.
**2020** (74th)	**Promising Young Woman** †	**Emerald Fennell**	
**2020** (74th)	Another Round	Tobias Lindholm and Thomas Vinterberg	
**2020** (74th)	Mank	Jack Fincher	
**2020** (74th)	Rocks	Theresa Ikoko and Claire Wilson	
**2020** (74th)	The Trial of the Chicago 7	Aaron Sorkin	
**2021** (75th)	**Licorice Pizza**	**Paul Thomas Anderson**	
**2021** (75th)	Being the Ricardos	Aaron Sorkin	
**2021** (75th)	Belfast †	Kenneth Branagh	
**2021** (75th)	Don't Look Up	Adam McKay	
**2021** (75th)	King Richard	Zach Baylin	
**2022** (76th)	**The Banshees of Inisherin**	**Martin McDonagh**	
**2022** (76th)	Everything Everywhere All at Once †	Daniel Kwan and Daniel Scheinert	
**2022** (76th)	The Fabelmans	Tony Kushner and Steven Spielberg	
**2022** (76th)	Tár	Todd Field	
**2022** (76th)	Triangle of Sadness	Ruben Östlund	
**2023** (77th)	**Anatomy of a Fall** †	**Justine Triet and Arthur Harari**	
**2023** (77th)	Barbie	Greta Gerwig and Noah Baumbach	
**2023** (77th)	The Holdovers	David Hemingson	
**2023** (77th)	Maestro	Bradley Cooper and Josh Singer	
**2023** (77th)	Past Lives	Celine Song	
**2024** (78th)	**A Real Pain**	**Jesse Eisenberg**	
**2024** (78th)	Anora †	Sean Baker	
**2024** (78th)	The Brutalist	Brady Corbet and Mona Fastvold	
**2024** (78th)	Kneecap	Rich Peppiatt, Naoise Ó Cairealláin, Liam Óg Ó Hannaidh, and JJ Ó Dochartaigh	
**2024** (78th)	The Substance	Coralie Fargeat	
**2025** (79th)	**Sinners** †	**Ryan Coogler**	
**2025** (79th)	I Swear	Kirk Jones	
**2025** (79th)	Marty Supreme	Ronald Bronstein and Josh Safdie	
**2025** (79th)	The Secret Agent	Kleber Mendonça Filho	
**2025** (79th)	Sentimental Value	Eskil Vogt and Joachim Trier	

== Multiple wins and nominations ==
=== Multiple wins ===
Wins	Screenwriter
4	Woody Allen
3	Martin McDonagh
2
2	Charlie Kaufman
2	Tom McCarthy
2	Quentin Tarantino

=== Multiple nominations ===
Nominations	Screenwriter
10	Woody Allen
6	Joel Coen and Ethan Coen
5	Quentin Tarantino
3	Paul Thomas Anderson
3	Wes Anderson
3	Alfonso Cuarón
3	Mike Leigh
3	David Leland
3	Martin McDonagh
2
2	Pedro Almodóvar
2	Guillermo Arriaga
2	Mark Boal
2	Damien Chazelle
2	Guillermo del Toro
2	Pete Docter
2	Nora Ephron
2	Bill Forsyth
2	Charlie Kaufman
2	Neil Jordan
2	John Logan
2	Kenneth Lonergan
2	Tom McCarthy
2	Adam McKay
2	Bob Peterson
2	Josh Singer
2	Aaron Sorkin
2	Steven Zaillian

== See also ==
- Academy Award for Best Story
- Golden Globe Award for Best Screenplay
- Academy Award for Best Original Screenplay
- AACTA International Award for Best Screenplay
- Critics' Choice Movie Award for Best Screenplay
- Writers Guild of America Award for Best Original Screenplay
