= Bobbie Ann Mason =

American novelist

- Born: May 1, 1940 (age 86); Mayfield, Kentucky, U.S.
- Education: University of Kentucky (BA); Binghamton University (MA); University of Connecticut (PhD)
- Writing career
- Notable works: Nabokov's Garden: A Guide to Ada (Ann Arbor, Mich.: Ardis, 1974) The Girl Sleuth: A Feminist Guide to the Bobbsey Twins, Nancy Drew, and Their Sisters (Old Westbury, N.Y.: Feminist Press, 1975) Shiloh and Other Stories (New York: Harper & Row, 1982; London: Chatto & Windus, 1982) In Country (New York: Harper & Row, 1985; London: Chatto & Windus, 1986) Clear Springs: A Memoir, Random House (New York, NY), 1999 The Girl in the Blue Beret, Random House (New York, NY), 2011
- Notable awards: PEN/Hemingway Award, 1983 National Endowment for the Arts award, 1983 Guggenheim Fellowship, 1984

Bobbie Ann Mason (born May 1, 1940) is an American novelist, short story writer, essayist, and literary critic from Kentucky. Her memoir was a finalist for the Pulitzer Prize.

== Early life and education ==
Bobbie Ann Mason was born May 1, 1940, to Wilburn and Christianna (Lee) Mason. She grew up on her family's dairy farm outside of Mayfield, Kentucky, with four siblings and her great niece Mya Mason. As a child, she loved to read with encouragement from her parents. She read series such as Bobbsey Twins and Nancy Drew. She later wrote about the books she read during her childhood in The Girl Sleuth: A Feminist Guide to the Bobbsey Twins, Nancy Drew, and Their Sisters. Mason credits her time at a grade school in Cuba, Kentucky, with influencing her adult fictional characters.

After high school, Mason majored in English at the University of Kentucky. After graduating in 1962, she worked for a fan magazine publisher in New York City, writing articles about various stars who were in the spotlight for movie magazines that Mason describes as "fluff." She earned her master's degree at the State University of New York at Binghamton in 1966. Next she went to graduate school at the University of Connecticut, where she subsequently received her Ph.D. in literature with a dissertation on Vladimir Nabokov's Ada in 1972. Her dissertation was published as Nabokov's Garden two years later while Mason taught at Mansfield State College (now Mansfield University).

== Career ==
By the time she was in her late thirties, Mason started to write short stories. In 1980, The New Yorker published her first story. "It took me a long time to discover my material", she said. "It wasn't a matter of developing writing skills, it was a matter of knowing how to see things. And it took me a very long time to grow up. I'd been writing for a long time, but was never able to see what there was to write about. I always aspired to things away from home, so it took me a long time to look back at home and realize that that's where the center of my thought was." Mason has written about the working-class people of Western Kentucky, and her short stories have contributed to a renaissance of regional fiction in America, creating a literary style that critics have labeled "shopping mall realism."

Mason then went on to write a collection of short stories, Shiloh and Other Stories. In 1985, she published her first novel, In Country, which eventually was made into a feature film (see below). She followed In Country with another novel in 1988, Spence and Lila. She has since published several more short story collections (see below). In 2016, Mason became the second living author to be inducted into the Kentucky Writers Hall of Fame.

Mason's dissertation, a critique of Vladimir Nabokov's Ada or Ardor, was published in 1974. A year later, she published The Girl Sleuth, a feminist assessment of Nancy Drew, the Bobbsey Twins, and other fictional girl detectives. Mason's first volume of short stories, Shiloh and Other Stories, appeared in 1982 and won the 1983 Ernest Hemingway Foundation Award for outstanding first works of fiction. Mason's novel In Country is often cited as one of the seminal literary works of the 1980s. Its protagonist attempts to come to terms with a number of important generational issues, ranging from the Vietnam War to consumer culture. A film version was produced in 1989, starring Emily Lloyd as the protagonist and Bruce Willis as her uncle.

Her short stories have appeared in numerous magazines, including The Atlantic Monthly, Mother Jones, The New Yorker, and The Paris Review. Mason has received a National Endowment for the Arts Fellowship and a Guggenheim Fellowship. She was a writer in residence at the University of Kentucky until 2011. Her short story "Wish" appears in The Norton Anthology of Literature by Women. Patchwork: A Bobbie Ann Mason Reader was published in 2018.

== Selected works ==
Short story collections

- Shiloh and Other Stories (1982)
- Love Life. Harper & Row, New York (1989)
- Midnight Magic (1998)
- Zigzagging Down a Wild Trail (2002)
- Nancy Culpepper (2006)

Novels

- In Country (1985)
- Feather Crowns (1993)
- An Atomic Romance (2005)
- The Girl in the Blue Beret (2011)
- Dear Ann (2020)

Novella

- Spence + Lila (1988)

Memoir

- Clear Springs: A Memoir (1999) ISBN 0-679-44925-6

Biography

- Elvis Presley (2002)

Criticism

- Nabokov's Garden (1974)
- The Girl Sleuth: A Feminist Guide (1975)

== Awards ==
- PEN/Hemingway Award, 1983
- National Endowment for the Arts award, 1983
- Pennsylvania Arts Council grant, 1983, 1989
- Guggenheim Fellowship, 1984
- Kentucky Governor's Award in the Arts, 2012
- Kentucky Literary Award, 2004, 2012
