= Checking Out (1989 film) =

1989 film by David Leland

- Directed by: David Leland
- Written by: Joe Eszterhas
- Produced by: Ben Myron; Garth Thomas; George Harrison; Denis O'Brien
- Starring: Jeff Daniels; Melanie Mayron; Michael Tucker; Kathleen York
- Cinematography: Ian Wilson
- Edited by: Lee Percy
- Music by: Carter Burwell
- Production company: HandMade Films
- Distributed by: Warner Bros. Pictures
- Release dates: October 26, 1988 (MIFED (Mercato internazionale del film e del documentario)); April 21, 1989 (United States)
- Running time: 96 minutes
- Country: United States
- Language: English
- Budget: $4-6 million
- Box office: $31,000 (US) £1,200 (UK)

Checking Out is a 1988 American comedy film, directed by David Leland and starring Jeff Daniels. It tells the story of a successful airline executive in his thirties who, despite a loving family and fulfilling career, experiences an existential crisis when his best friend unexpectedly dies of a heart attack.

== Plot ==
Ray Macklin and Pat Hagen are lifelong friends united over their shared love of aviation. One day, at a family barbecue, Pat unexpectedly dies in front of Ray from sudden cardiac arrest while in the middle of a dad joke: "Why don't Italians have barbecues?" Ray is one of the few people devastated by Pat's death, which elicits mostly practical or apathetic responses from those around him: their coworkers worry about the future of the company, while Pat's wife can only complain that his death is the result of his own poor choices, such as ignoring his health and having an affair with his secretary, Diana.

After learning from Pat's wife that he may have ignored impending signs of death, including chronic lethargy and premature erectile dysfunction, Ray becomes a full-blown hypochondriac. Meanwhile, Ray's grief is compounded when their company decides to promote him to Pat's old position as a vice president, unceremoniously moving Ray into Pat's old office. To consolidate resources, the company informs Ray's secretary, Barbara, that they're laying her off and reassigning Diana to him. Barbara becomes hostile and paranoid, believing that Ray is allowing her to be fired so he can resume Pat's affair with Diana, a fear shared by Ray's wife, Jenny.

Ray's cardiologist arranges for him to visit a psychologist, Dr. Duffin. After a brief session, Ray believes he's achieved a new lease on life and briefly enjoys a return to his old mindset. Two days later, Ray learns Duffin died as the result of a freak infection contracted after cutting himself shaving. The news sends Ray into another downward spiral. Though Ray's cardiologist informs him that his test results are routine and show only common Mitral valve prolapse, he spends a large sum of money on state-of-the-art home diagnostic equipment at a medical supply company.

Jenny comes to believe that Ray's increased time away from home is due to him having an affair with Diana. She attempts to initiate sex with him, only for Ray to rebuff her advances in favor of installing a hydrotherapy device in their bathtub. Their argument is interrupted by their daughter having a nightmare about a plane crash. In their children's bedroom, Jenny sees that Ray sent their son to bed attached to a high tech pulse oximeter. Believing that Ray's obsession with death is negatively impacting their family, Jenny kicks him out of the house.

Ray sleeps in his car at the office, where Barbara confronts him over his failure to secure her job. The pair's argument escalates into them having loud, public sex in the front seat of Ray's car in front of his boss. The incident is briefly forgotten when one of the company's planes has to make an emergency landing. Though there are no casualties, Ray is tasked with traveling to meet the survivors for a press conference. Boarding the plane, Ray becomes convinced that the flight is the one his daughter had dreamed about the night before and that they will crash. To forestall takeoff, Ray makes a bomb threat. The passengers panic and the plane is evacuated. Ray's boss fires him on the tarmac for his many recent failures. Ray collapses from a burst appendix.

On the operating table, Ray suffers cardiac arrest and has a near death experience in which Pat escorts him to their allotted space in the afterlife. Ray is troubled to discover Heaven, for he and Pat, is a motel in the desert populated almost exclusively by White people who attend round-the-clock A cappella poolside concerts. Pat explains that, due to their aviation connections, the pair have been assigned to Howard Hughes' version of Heaven, where there are a minimum of black people, everyone is a teetotaler, and no one enjoys swimming. Ray finally breaks down and admits his hypochondria is the manifestation of his grief over Pat's death. Pat consoles his friend and the two men admit they will miss one another.

Ray awakens in the hospital. Although he spent a week in a coma following his heart attack, his appendectomy was a success, and he has made a full recovery. Ray spontaneously remembers the punchline to Pat's joke—Italians don't have barbecues-- "The spaghetti would fall through the grill"—and achieves a sense of closure over his death. Ray and his family leave the hospital as Ray recalls he and Pat flying model airplanes as children.

== Cast ==
- Jeff Daniels as Ray Macklin
- Melanie Mayron as Jenny Macklin
- Michael Tucker as Harry Lardner
- Kathleen York as Diana
- Ann Magnuson as Connie Hagen
- Allan Havey as Pat Hagen
- Jo Harvey Allen as Barbara
- Ian Wolfe as Mr. D'Amato
- Billy Beck as Father Carmody
- Trudy Dochterman as Val (as Trudi Dochtermann)
- John Durbin as Spencer Gillinger
- Adelle Lutz as Dr. Helmsley
- Felton Perry as Dr. Duffin
- Allan Rich as Dr. Haskell
- Danton Stone as Dr. Wolfe
- David Byrne as Bartender

== Production ==
=== Development ===
The film was based on a spec script by Joe Eszterhas. It was based on a period in his life when he made $400,000 from selling the novelisation rights to F.I.S.T. and was wealthy for the first time in his life and suffered a massive panic attack which he thought was a heart attack.

Eszterhas tried to sell the script but could not find a buyer. Three years later he was approached by an aspiring producer called Ben Myron who asked if Eszterhas had any available scripts and the writer gave him Checking Out. Eszterhas said "So he singlehandedly, unrelentingly, for two years did nothing but try to push this project. Well, nobody knew who the fuck he was, but he kept badgering people and going after people."

The script was optioned to a small production company, Island, who tried to attach various directors, eventually ending up with David Leland, who had just made Wish You Were Here and who Eszterhas called "sort of the hot, arty flavor of the moment." The production company then dropped the project but it was picked up by Britain's HandMade Films, owned by Denis O'Brien and George Harrison. Eszterhas sold the script to them for $300,000 and says Leland promised not to change a word, and that he would be given the credits "Ben Myron and Joe Eszterhas Present" and "a Joe Eszterhas Script". Eszterhas also claimed he persuaded Jeff Daniels to make the film.

Leland said, "Since Wish You Were Here I've been sent lots of scripts, which is encouraging, and I really like this one. It's a sort of black comedy about mortality."

=== Shooting ===
Filming took place in February 1988. According to Eszterhas, Leland started changing the script during filming. Eszterhas saw the rough cut and claims he "loathed" some of Leland's changes, including the addition of new subplots, creating characters "with Jewish names who are repellent and horrible" and "the fact that it's insulting to women." The writer says HandMade backed Leland, so he wrote an angry letter to Warner Bros. Pictures (the American distributors) threatening to take his name off the film. Warners pressured HandMade to take the film out of Leland's hands and Eszterhas wrote "Leland took most of what I was objecting to out and I put my name back on."

"It was the single worst experience I’ve had with something getting changed and screwed over," said Eszterhaus (in 1991). "Ironically, it happened not with a studio picture, but it happened with a little independent."

== Reception ==
Eszterhas wrote, "the movie was minimally distributed and bombed." Jeff Daniels later joked that "six people saw" the film.

On Rotten Tomatoes, the film has an approval rating of 20% based on reviews from five critics.

"This movie tends to crumble like a day old coffee shop donut," wrote the Los Angeles Times.

Variety called it a "dreadfully unfunny one-joke black comedy about hypochondria and mortality" which "depends almost entirely for suspense of Jeff Daniels’ ‘Why don’t Italians have barbecues?’ Sadly, some 90 minutes elapse before he finds out."

The Boston Globe called it "vintage white whine, a terminally unfunny comedy."

Roger Ebert of the Chicago Sun-Times gave the film two out of four, and wrote: "The problem with Checking Out is that it provides us with fears we can understand and responses that seem to have been phoned in from a sitcom."

== Notes ==
- Eszterhas, Joe (2004). Hollywood animal : a memoir. Knopf.
- Froug, William (1991). The new screenwriter looks at the new screenwriter. Silman-James Press.
