= Ian Wilson (cinematographer) =

British cinematographer (1939–2021)

- Born: 23 April 1939; London, England
- Died: 20 January 2021 (aged 81); London, England
- Education: London Film School
- Occupation: Cinematographer

Ian Wilson BSC (23 April 1939 – 20 January 2021) was a British cinematographer.

== Biography ==
Ian Wilson was born in London, England. He studied graphic design and photography at the Nottingham School of Art and the London International Film School. In the 1960s he worked for the United Nations and made footage for documentaries in Greece. In 1966 he entered the film business and his first work as cinematographer was Private Right by Michael Papas. In the period after this, he made short films, commercials, or documentaries. Notable features in the 1970s were the animated movie Butterfly Ball (the filming of the eponymous work by Roger Glover) and the science fiction series Quatermass by Piers Haggard. In 1982 he received a BAFTA Award nomination for his work on The Flame Trees of Thika by Roy Ward Baker. In 1986 he began his collaboration with director and screenwriter David Leland. He worked with Leland on his films Wish You Were Here, Checking Out, and The Big Man. Other well-known films which were photographed by Ian Wilson are Edward II, Backbeat, Erik the Viking, Emma, and The Crying Game. For the 1999 film version of A Christmas Carol with Patrick Stewart he received an Emmy Award nomination.

Wilson had Parkinson's disease and died from COVID-19 on 20 January 2021. He was 81.

== Selected filmography ==
- Bartleby (1970)
- The Breaking of Bumbo (1970)
- Up the Chastity Belt (1971)
- The House in Nightmare Park (1973)
- Gawain and the Green Knight (1973)
- Children of Rage (1975)
- Privates on Parade (1982)
- Wish You Were Here (1987)
- Dream Demon (1988)
- Erik the Viking (1989)
- Checking Out (1989)
- The Big Man (1990)
- Edward II (1991)
- The Crying Game (1992)
- Backbeat (1994)
- Emma (1996)
- Savior (1998)
- A Christmas Carol (1999)
- Below (2002)
