= Chicago Joe and the Showgirl =

1990 British film by Bernard Rose

- Theatrical release poster
- Directed by: Bernard Rose
- Written by: David Yallop
- Produced by: Tim Bevan
- Starring: Kiefer Sutherland; Emily Lloyd; Patsy Kensit
- Cinematography: Mike Southon
- Edited by: Carlos Puente
- Music by: Shirley Walker; Hans Zimmer
- Production companies: PolyGram; Working Title Films
- Distributed by: Palace Pictures
- Release date: 27 July 1990
- Running time: 103 minutes
- Country: United Kingdom
- Language: English
- Budget: $5 million
- Box office: $85,395 (US) £58,037 (UK)

Chicago Joe and the Showgirl is a 1990 British crime drama film directed by Bernard Rose and written by David Yallop, inspired by the real-life Hulten/Jones murder case of 1944, otherwise known as the Cleft Chin Murder. The film stars Kiefer Sutherland and Emily Lloyd.

== Plot ==
In the film, Karl Hulten (Kiefer Sutherland) is an American GI who is stalking the black market of London after stealing an army truck and going AWOL. There he meets up with Betty Jones (Emily Lloyd), a stripper with a deluded fantasy world view formed by watching a steady stream of Hollywood film noir and gangster pictures. Seeing Karl, who claims he is "Chicago Joe" doing advance work in London for encroaching Chicago gangsters, Betty takes the opportunity to set her fantasies to life as she connives Karl into a spree of petty crimes. With luck on their side, the spree keeps escalating, until Betty urges Karl to commit the ultimate crime: murder.

== Cast ==
- Kiefer Sutherland as Karl Hulten / "Chicago Joe"
- Emily Lloyd as Betty Jones
- Liz Fraser as Mrs. Evans
- John Lahr as Radio Commentator
- Harry Fowler as Morry
- Keith Allen as Lenny Bexley
- Patsy Kensit as Joyce Cook
- Angela Morant as Customer
