= 1987 National Society of Film Critics Awards =

Annual US film awards ceremony

22nd NSFC Awards

January 4, 1988

Best Film:
The Dead

The 22nd National Society of Film Critics Awards, given on 4 January 1988, honored the best filmmaking of 1987.

== Winners ==
=== Best Picture ===
1. The Dead
2. Hope and Glory
3. The Last Emperor

=== Best Director ===
1. John Boorman – Hope and Glory
2. John Huston – The Dead
3. Juzo Itami – Tampopo

=== Best Actor ===
1. Steve Martin – Roxanne
2. Albert Brooks – Broadcast News
3. Terry O'Quinn – The Stepfather

=== Best Actress ===
1. Emily Lloyd – Wish You Were Here
2. Diane Keaton – Baby Boom
3. Holly Hunter – Broadcast News and Raising Arizona

=== Best Supporting Actor ===
1. Morgan Freeman – Street Smart
2. Sean Connery – The Untouchables
3. Albert Brooks – Broadcast News

=== Best Supporting Actress ===
1. Kathy Baker – Street Smart
2. Vanessa Redgrave – Prick Up Your Ears
3. Anjelica Huston – The Dead

=== Best Screenplay ===
1. John Boorman – Hope and Glory
2. Joel and Ethan Coen – Raising Arizona
3. Juzo Itami – Tampopo

=== Best Cinematography ===
- Philippe Rousselot – Hope and Glory

=== Special Award ===
- Richard Roud
