= George Akers =

Australian film editor

- Occupation: Film editor

George Akers is a film editor with more than thirty years' experience in filmmaking. In 1993 he was nominated by the Australian Film Institute for Best Achievement in Editing for his work on Map of the Human Heart, which was also shown out of competition at Cannes.

== Filmography ==
- Ascendancy (1983)
- Caravaggio (1986)
- Personal Services (1987)
- With You Were Here (1987)
- Paris by Night (1988)
- Erik the Viking (1989)
- The Bulldance (1989)
- The Big Man (1990)
- Enchanted April (1991) (uncredited)
- American Friends (1991)
- Edward II (1991)
- Map of the Human Heart (1992)
- The Secret Rapture (1993)
- Princess Caraboo (1994)
- Second Best (1994)
- Carrington (1995)
- When Saturday Comes (1996)
- The Secret Agent (1996)
- The Designated Mourner (1997)
- The Clandestine Marriage (1999)
- Anazapta (2002)
- Imagining Argentina (2003)
- Method (2004)
- Lady Godiva (2008)
