= Cookie (film) =

1989 film by Susan Seidelman

- Theatrical release poster
- Directed by: Susan Seidelman
- Written by: Nora Ephron; Alice Arlen
- Produced by: Laurence Mark
- Starring: Peter Falk; Dianne Wiest; Emily Lloyd; Michael V. Gazzo; Brenda Vaccaro; Adrian Pasdar; Jerry Lewis
- Cinematography: Oliver Stapleton
- Edited by: Andrew Mondshein
- Music by: Thomas Newman
- Production company: Lorimar Film Entertainment
- Distributed by: Warner Bros.
- Release date: August 23, 1989
- Running time: 94 minutes
- Country: United States
- Language: English
- Box office: $1 million

Cookie is a 1989 American crime comedy film directed by Susan Seidelman and starring Peter Falk, Emily Lloyd, and Dianne Wiest, with Michael V. Gazzo, Brenda Vaccaro, Adrian Pasdar, Jerry Lewis, and Joy Behar.

== Plot ==
Night beside the Brooklyn Bridge. A man, seen only from the back, walks to a huge stretch limo and gets in. It explodes. The view through binoculars morphs into the title “cookie” and then to a tabloid headline “Dapper Dino dead”. At the funeral, the camera focuses on an elegantly dressed woman veiled in black. A flashback to “A few months earlier” shows the same person—Cookie Voltecki, dressed in an outfit that was rebellious in 1989, and her friend Pia, walking through a street fair. They jump the turnstiles at a public transit station and resist arrest. In court, Henry Solomon, a lawyer unknown to Cookie but familiar to the judge, rushes in, gets her released on her own recognizance and hustles her to a waiting limo for the long drive to meet her father. Her father is Dapper Dino Capisco, about be paroled after serving thirteen years of his sentence. He is disgusted with her gum-chewing, wise-cracking behavior and the way she has been worrying her mother—and he is worried about his parole.

Back in the city, we learn her mother and Dino were not married. To straighten Cookie out, Dino sends her to work with his partner Carmine, on 7th avenue.

Dino is paroled. His annoying wife, Bunny, drives him home. Cut to Lenore, preparing for a visit from Dino, who wants to take her to Atlantic City. They start making love and Cookie leaves. In Atlantic City, gang kingpin Arnold Ross tells Dino that he bought out Carmine—and hence Dino—and the money Dino was counting on for his retirement is with his partner. Dino confronts Carmine, who promises they'll talk at his Christmas party.

At Lenore's urging, he takes Cookie. Enzo Della Testa, the capo di tutti cappi” tells Carmine he must “deal with” Dino. Carmine welcomes Dino home among his friends. When Carmine's son makes a pass at her, Cookie burns his tie with her cigarette. Dino takes her out to the parking lot and tells her that you never let people know that revenge is coming. Dino has her drive the limo. Federal agents follow them, but Cookie loses them.

At Bunny's apartment—where he sleeps on the sofa—she tells him the day she gives him a divorce is the day he dies. District Attorney Segretto has put photos in the newspapers as part a campaign to label Dino the new godfather. Carmine offers Dino $25,000. Dino turns a table into his lap. Carmine's men shoot at Dino's car while Cookie is driving and blow up Dino's limo.

Cookie contacts Segretto. She offers to testify against her father's associates as long as he is put in witness protection. She suggests they fake his death. Dino and Cookie leak information that Dino has millions of dollars and is planning to retire to Sicily. The cops pack Dino's car with explosives, set to go off at 9 pm. Carmine decides to take the money and then kill Dino, but the plan goes awry when the money is stolen by two motorcycle cops—one of whom is Vito wearing a fake mustache.

Carmine calls Dino, telling him that Ross is holding Cookie. Dino says to meet him under the bridge at 9 pm. A variation on the opening scene of the film plays. Carmine gets into the limo, next to a corpse dressed in Dino's clothes. The limo explodes. Cookie, Ross, Vito and everyone involved in the conspiracy are partying.

The district attorney is horrified that he accidentally killed Carmine. Dino tells him he still needs to honor his agreement.

Dino and Lenore leave on a small plane. Cookie hugs her father. “You are going straight, aren't you?” Dino calls to her. “Sure..” she says and has a picture taken of the three of them as a family.

Cookie dresses for the funeral like a fashion plate, waking Vito with a kiss. Dino and Lenore marry in Minnesota while the funeral goes on. As mourners drive away, Cookie lifts her veil and smiles at Della Testa, who salutes her. She looks at the camera, smiles and shrugs.

== Cast ==
- Peter Falk as Dominick "Dino" Capisco
- Dianne Wiest as Lenore Voltecki
- Emily Lloyd as Carmela "Cookie" Voltecki
- Michael V. Gazzo as Carmine
- Brenda Vaccaro as Bunny Capisco
- Adrian Pasdar as Vito
- Lionel Stander as Enzo Della Testa
- Jerry Lewis as Arnold Ross
- Bob Gunton as Richie Segretto
- Joe Mantello as Dominick
- Ricki Lake as Pia
- Joy Behar as Dottie
- Mark Boone Junior as Policeman
- Tony Sirico as Carmine's Wiseguy
- George Bartenieff as Andy O'Brien

== Production ==
Principal photography began on January 7, 1988, and concluded on April 15 of that year, with filming taking place in Queens, Little Italy, Chinatown, Coney Island, Elmont, the Garment District, the Manhattan Supreme Court courthouse, and Atlantic City.

=== Music ===
"Slammer" by Thomas Newman is the opening theme. "I Should Be So Lucky", performed by Kylie Minogue, is played over the end credits.

== Home media ==
Warner Archive released the film on made-to-order DVD in the United States on May 4, 2010.

== Critical reception ==
Cookie received negative reviews from critics upon its release. On the review aggregator website Rotten Tomatoes, the film holds an approval rating of 13% based on 16 reviews, with an average rating of 4.5/10.

Roger Ebert said the film was funny and pleasant in some sense, but he felt it "[wasn't] very memorable probably because the filmmakers didn't have a clear vision of it themselves."

Myra Forsberg of The New York Times wrote: "But while Ms. Seidelman has gleefully shown bad girls having fun before - notably Madonna as a casual thief in Desperately Seeking Susan - one of her trickier tasks in Cookie was depicting the male milieu of the mob. A lot of the actors in this are middle-aged men, and that was a challenge, because in most of the films I've done before, the majority of the characters were female. In Cookie, there were certain scenes showing two guys in male situations, like in the back of an Italian social club discussing business, which I didn't know whether I'd be able to pull off without making it clichéish or girlish."

Sheila Benson of the Los Angeles Times wrote: "The funniest observation that “Cookie,” opening today in San Diego County, makes about its New York Mafioso subjects is the mobsters’ routine greeting at home each night. After a hard day’s labor racketeering, drug dealing and money laundering, as the men hit the door, their wives call out brightly, "So, honey, d’ya have a nice day?" It’s a touch that makes you smile, the sort of perfect detailing with which another director, Elaine May, studs her scripts and her films. Here, director Susan Seidelman keeps her frame busy and lively, and her eye for the right actor in every small role is still precise. But May’s lethal observations always come with a core of humanity, quite missing from Cookie’s frail farce."
