= The Secret Agent (1996 film) =

- Home video poster
- Directed by: Christopher Hampton
- Written by: Christopher Hampton
- Based on: The Secret Agent by Joseph Conrad
- Starring: Bob Hoskins; Patricia Arquette; Gérard Depardieu; Christian Bale
- Cinematography: Denis Lenoir
- Edited by: George Akers
- Music by: Philip Glass
- Production companies: Fox Searchlight Pictures; Capitol Films
- Distributed by: 20th Century Fox
- Release date: 8 November 1996
- Running time: 95 minutes
- Country: United Kingdom
- Language: English
- Box office: $106,606

The Secret Agent is a 1996 British drama-thriller film written and directed by Christopher Hampton and starring Bob Hoskins and Patricia Arquette. It is adapted from Joseph Conrad's 1907 novel of the same name.

== Plot ==
Verloc works as a spy for the Russian government. He is hired by a foreign organisation to cause political instability in the country.

== Cast ==
- Bob Hoskins as Verloc
- Patricia Arquette as Winnie
- Gérard Depardieu as Ossipon
- Christian Bale as Stevie
- Jim Broadbent as Chief Inspector Heat
- Eddie Izzard as Vladimir
- Ralph Nossek as Yundt
- Elizabeth Spriggs as Winnie's mother
- Peter Vaughan as the Driver
- Julian Wadham as the Assistant Commissioner
- Robin Williams as the Professor (uncredited)

== Release ==
The film opened on 8 November 1996 in New York and Los Angeles on 6 screens and grossed $22,401 in its opening weekend.

== Reception ==
On Rotten Tomatoes, the film has an approval rating of 50%, based on reviews from 10 critics. On Metacritic, it also has a score of 41 out of 100, based on reviews from 17 critics, indicating "mixed or average reviews".

Written reviews prove more negative. Time Out stated that whilst Hampton's version of this story is "more respectful of Conrad's narrative, characters and tone" than Hitchcock's Sabotage, he "travesties the novel". Similarly, Variety stated that "the fidelity of which to the original text does not yield a terrifically exciting film" The New York Times described the film as "drably tasteful", with its only affective performance being from the uncredited Robin Williams. The Los Angeles Times however, gave it a positive review, saying that it "is the kind of film that demands you to grab on to it and hold on for dear life."
