= Zenith Productions =

Former British independent film and television production company

- Founded: 1984; 42 years ago
- Defunct: 30 August 2006; 19 years ago
- Fate: Administration; later liquidated
- Successor: ITV Studios
- Headquarters: United Kingdom
- Products: Motion pictures, television production

Zenith Productions (later Zenith Entertainment) was a British independent film and television production company. Zenith created content for the BBC, ITV, Channel 4, Sky and UKTV, including a number of series such as Inspector Morse for ITV and Byker Grove and Hamish Macbeth for the BBC. Through its subsidiary Blaze Television, Zenith produced the Saturday morning series SMTV Live and CD:UK for ITV featuring Ant & Dec. The company ceased trading in 2006.

== History ==
Zenith was established in 1984 as a subsidiary of Central Television, the holder of the ITV Midlands broadcast franchise. The company was headed by Charles Denton, formerly the controller of programmes at Central's predecessor, ATV. The company was initially designed to target the American market, and the company initially ran in a similar fashion to the Euston Films subsidiary of Thames Television. Some of Zenith's early productions or co-productions included the films The Hit, Wetherby, Insignificance, Sid and Nancy, Personal Services, Billy the Kid and the Green Baize Vampire, Prick Up Your Ears and Wish You Were Here. Other productions with which Zenith was involved include Escape from Sobibor, A Gathering of Old Men and an adaptation of James Joyce's story "The Dead". Zenith also worked on the Inspector Morse television series, which began airing in 1987. In 1986, the company unveiled a pair of American-involved features, which included the film Slam Dance, which was directed by Wayne Wang, and it was presold to film distributor The Samuel Goldwyn Company. In November 1987, Zenith Productions teamed up with film distributor/producer Atlantic Entertainment Group for a $20-million, three-picture agreement, after the success of Wish You Were Here, which Atlantic was distributing in North America, in which the agreement was more than subtle than a 50/50 agreement, and will be an equal partnership, and three films would be covered for the Atlantic/Zenith deal, which included pictures in the first wave like Patty, as well as For Queen and Country and The Wolves of Willoughby Chase, a co-production between the Czech Republic and the U.S., and Atlantic would handle worldwide rights for the former, and had North American rights to the latter two, and foreign sales would be handled by Zenith's Sales Company.

Ahead of an IBA directive that 25% of ITV programming would have to be provided by independents, Zenith was sold by Central to Carlton Communications in October 1987 for £6.3 million. Zenith announced that they were planning to become a separate independent production company, producing projects for not just Central, but for other networks and ITV franchisees, like Channel 4, while the British government is requiring the 16 ITV companies and BBC to commission an increasing quantity of independently produced material from outside suppliers. Carlton sold a 49% stake to Paramount Pictures in 1989. Carlton had also bought the game-show specialist Action Time, which it folded into Zenith as a separate division, although the two units continued to maintain separate identities.

New productions included the series The Paradise Club and Byker Grove in 1989, both for the BBC, one-off drama documentary Shoot to Kill (1990) for Yorkshire Television/ITV, sci-fi drama Chimera (1991) for Anglia Television/ITV and the children's series Gophers! (1990) for Channel 4.

=== 1993–2006 ===
Carlton took on the ITV London franchise in 1993 and was compelled to divest Zenith. The profitable game-show subsidiary Action Time was sold to its management, with Carlton and Paramount each retaining a 15% holding. (The company was later re-acquired by Carlton in 2003, after rules on ITV production had changed). The drama side of Zenith was more of a challenge, but eventually found a buyer in Portman Entertainment, headed by Victor Glynn. The company was initially merged with Portman's existing production arm, but was separated the next year. Charles Denton left the company with the change of ownership; Ivan Rendall, producer of Byker Grove, subsequently took over as managing director.

Drama series produced by the company included the Leslie Grantham vehicle 99-1 (1994) and Bodyguards (1996) for ITV, The Famous Five (1995) for Children's ITV and for the BBC the very popular Hamish MacBeth (1995) and the epic but less popular Rhodes (1996). The company also moved into entertainment, producing first the Ant & Dec Show (1995) on Children's BBC for the two popular stars from Byker Grove, and then the hit Saturday morning ITV shows SMTV Live (1998) and CD:UK (1998), under the aegis of a specially formed subsidiary, Blaze Television.

In 1998 Zenith merged with a city-backed investment and rights-ownership group, Television Enterprise & Asset Management (Team), and renamed itself Zenith Entertainment. By 2000, with the continuing success of Byker Grove, SMTV Live and CD:UK, the company was producing 300 hours of television a year, and was almost sold to United News & Media for £27 million. Instead, in 2003 the company was bought out by its management for somewhat less than £10 million.

New Zenith programmes in this period included Two Thousand Acres of Sky (2001) and 55 Degrees North (2004) for the BBC, the reality game show The Enemy Within (2002) for the BBC, and children's programmes The Ghost Hunter (2000) for BBC and the animated King Arthur's Disasters (2005) for ITV.

However, the company received a fatal double blow in 2006, when the BBC cut back on drama programming for teenagers and cancelled Byker Grove after 17 years, and ITV cancelled the CD:UK music show. The company tried to seek a merger partner, but eventually had to announce it would cease trading. The music subsidiary Blaze Television was sold to United States producer Shout! Factory, who continued to produce CD:USA for a time with the format of the UK show.

=== 2016 ===
In 2016, the rights to the Zenith Entertainment library were purchased by Simply Media TV. Additionally, it was reported in certain UK tabloids, that duo "Ant and Dec" had bought the outright IP rights for the entire run of Byker Grove, and SMTV Live - which they were both famous for.
