= Shiloh and Other Stories =

1982 short story collection by Bobbie Ann Mason

- First edition cover
- Author: Bobbie Ann Mason
- Publisher: Harper & Row
- Publication date: November 3, 1982
- ISBN: 0-375-75843-7

Shiloh and Other Stories is a 1982 collection of short stories written by American author Bobbie Ann Mason. The collection won the Ernest Hemingway Foundation award for fiction. The collection brought Mason her first critical acclaim.

The short story alluded to in the collection's title, "Shiloh", revolves around a man named Leroy who lives in rural Kentucky and is forced to quit his job as a truck driver after an accident. The plot centers around his attempt to adjust to life after the accident, while at the same time facing problems with his marriage and attempting to cope with the urbanization of his neighborhood, which was once a community of farmers. The story ends with Leroy and his wife Norma Jean visiting the battlefield of Shiloh, where Norma Jean tells Leroy that she is leaving him. Norma Jean then walks to the edge of the bluff and looks over, Leroy pursues her, and the story ends.
