= Anazapta =

- DVD cover
- Directed by: Alberto Sciamma
- Screenplay by: Harriet Sand; Alberto Sciamma
- Produced by: Michael Cowan
- Starring: Jason Flemyng; Lena Headey; Christopher Fairbank; Ian McNeice; Jeff Nuttall
- Cinematography: Alastair Meux
- Edited by: George Akers
- Music by: Dan Jones
- Production companies: Beyond Films; Enterprise Films; Great British Films; Spice Factory
- Release date: 26 July 2002 (Germany)
- Running time: 105 min (DVD cut)
- Country: United Kingdom
- Language: English

Anazapta is a 2002 British mystery thriller film directed by Alberto Sciamma and starring Jason Flemyng, Lena Headey, Christopher Fairbank, Ian McNeice, Jeff Nuttall. In the US the film was released as Black Plague.

== Plot ==
The film is set in England in 1348. While the Hundred Years War rages on between England and France, a detachment of soldiers returns to the estate of the beautiful English noblewoman Lady Matilda (Lena Headey) with news that her husband, Sir Walter de Mellerby (Jon Finch), was captured and remains hostage in France.

Meanwhile, the soldiers led by her husband's nephew Nicholas (Jason Flemyng) have brought with them a prisoner, Jacques de Saint Amant (David La Haye), the son of the one holding her husband. He can be exchanged for Sir Walter and for an additional ransom, which will save her estate from bankruptcy, as they are deeply in debt to the bishop. When Lady Matilda asks the bishop (Ian McNeice) for time to get the ransom, he informs her that he will expect sexual favors from her if the money does not arrive.

After some time, however, the inhabitants of the manor begin to die, one by one, a mysterious and painful death. Lady Matilda starts suspecting that the prisoner, whom she has come to care for, is not the one he claims to be.

== Cast ==
- Lena Headey as Lady Matilda Mellerby
- David La Haye as Jacques de Saint Amant
- Jason Flemyng as Nicholas
- Christopher Fairbank as Steward
- Anthony O'Donnell as Randall
- Jeff Nuttall as Priest
- Ralph Riach as Physician
- Hayley Carmichael as Agnes
- Ian McNeice as Bishop
- Jon Finch as Sir Walter de Mellerby
