= Emily Lloyd =

British actress (born 1970)

- Born: Emily Alice Lloyd-Pack; 29 September 1970 (age 55); London, England
- Education: Italia Conti Academy of Theatre Arts
- Occupation: Actress
- Years active: 1986–2016
- Children: 1
- Father: Roger Lloyd-Pack
- Relatives: Charles Lloyd-Pack (paternal grandfather)
- Awards: 1987 National Society of Film Critics Awards

Emily Alice Lloyd-Pack (born 29 September 1970), known as Emily Lloyd, is a British retired actress. At the age of 16, she starred in her debut and breakthrough role in the 1987 film Wish You Were Here, for which she received critical acclaim and Best Actress awards from the National Society of Film Critics and the Evening Standard British Film Awards. She subsequently relocated to Manhattan at 17, received numerous film offers, and starred in the 1989 films Cookie and In Country.

Lloyd's mental health began to decline in her late teens, and she missed out on several prominent roles due to a combination of factors. She turned down the lead role in the 1990 film Pretty Woman as she had already agreed to star in Mermaids, from which she was later recast. She was fired from the 1992 film Husbands and Wives as her deteriorating health affected her ability to work, and was also replaced in the 1995 film Tank Girl. In 1997, a journalist said Lloyd was "in danger of becoming better known for the parts she has lost than those she has played". Though she continued to act in films during this time, she was mostly relegated to supporting roles.

Lloyd's mental health continued to deteriorate in later years. While she played the lead role in the 2002 independent film The Honeytrap to critical acclaim, and also performed in theatrical productions, she had difficulty finding work and was diagnosed with several mental health conditions. By 2013, Lloyd's health had stabilised. That same year she published an autobiography, Wish I Was There.

== Early life ==
Lloyd was born in London, the daughter of actor Roger Lloyd-Pack and Sheila, née Ball, a theatrical agent who was a long-time secretary at Harold Pinter's stage agency. Her grandfather, Charles Lloyd-Pack, was also a stage and film actor. Lloyd's parents separated when she was 18 months old; her father moved out of the family home and Emily continued to live with her mother in Milner Square, Islington. Her mother married telephone engineer Martin Ball and, when Lloyd was five, had a second daughter, Charlotte; the couple separated two months after her birth. Her father married Jehane Markham in 2000; they had three sons: Hartley, Louis and Spencer.

== Film career ==
At the age of 15, Lloyd was taking acting lessons at the Italia Conti School in London. In 1986, director David Leland cast her as Lynda, the leading role in his film Wish You Were Here. The film was based loosely on the memoirs of Cynthia Payne. Lloyd's younger half-sister Charlotte played the 11-year-old Lynda in a flashback sequence. Wish You Were Here received an International Federation of Film Critics award at the 1987 Cannes Film Festival, and Lloyd received widespread acclaim for her performance. Roger Ebert said she was the key to the film's performance, calling it "one of the great debut roles for a young actress". Lloyd received the 'Best Actress' award from the National Society of Film Critics in 1987, and also at the 1987 Evening Standard British Film Awards. She was also nominated for the BAFTA Award for Best Actress in a Leading Role in 1988.

Following her success, Steven Spielberg warned her not to get involved in the film industry and to "be a kid and go to Disneyland". Lloyd, however, moved to Manhattan where she was living alone at 17. She received numerous film offers and reportedly beat over 5,000 actresses, including Jodie Foster, for the lead role in the 1989 film Cookie. Lloyd reported that her mental health deteriorated in Manhattan, and began developing a tic, had difficulty concentrating, and was hearing voices. She later said she was aware she needed help but did not know how to go about getting treatment. Her co-star in Cookie, Peter Falk, became so frustrated with her during filming that he slapped her, after which she slapped him back. Lloyd's performance in Cookie was praised by The New York Times. Her next role was in the 1989 film In Country opposite Bruce Willis, though the two stars reportedly did not get along during filming. Peter Travers from the Rolling Stone remarked on the limits of Lloyd's nuanced acting and he asked "what a resourceful firebrand like Winona Ryder might have done with the role". Rick Groen from The Globe and Mail praised Lloyd's performance as "letter perfect – her accent impeccable and her energy immense". Lloyd had been coached on dialect for American roles by Tim Monich.

Lloyd had to turn down an offer for the lead role in Pretty Woman; she had already been contracted to star in the 1990 film Mermaids. Lloyd was cast as the daughter of the character played by the film's star, Cher. Cher, however, thought that Lloyd did not look enough like her to portray her daughter and complained about her casting. The original director of the film, Lasse Hallström, was fired at Cher's insistence, and Lloyd was subsequently told she was no longer required. Her part was given to Winona Ryder. Lloyd sued Orion Pictures for breach of contract and received $175,000 in damages. Her next role was in the 1990 film Chicago Joe and the Showgirl; Roger Ebert commented that Lloyd "shows again, in only her fourth role, what a remarkable new talent she is." Shortly thereafter she began dating musician Gavin Rossdale. According to Lloyd the relationship was troubled, and one night at his apartment alone, she attempted suicide by taking aspirin and slashing her wrists. She was found by one of Rossdale's friends and spent the next six weeks in hospital. She was cast in Woody Allen's 1992 film Husbands and Wives, but was fired by him after two weeks due to her ill health. Allen complained Lloyd was spending too much time in her trailer; Lloyd later stated that was because she was making herself vomit. Later in 1992, she had a supporting role in Robert Redford's A River Runs Through It. The Hollywood Reporter said that Lloyd provided "another memorable performance", while Malcolm Johnson from the Hartford Courant said she and co-star Brad Pitt brought "verve and charm" to the film. In 1995, she was initially cast as the eponymous lead character for the film Tank Girl. The film's director, Rachel Talalay, states she fired Lloyd for refusing to shave her head for the role. Lloyd, who had spent four months training for the film, disputes this. She offered to reschedule her appointment with the film's hair stylist to the following day because the stylist had a dinner date. Talalay ostensibly fired her for "being difficult". Lloyd said she was actually fired due to their personality clashes. Lloyd states she "went to pieces" after Tank Girl, believing she was cursed.

In 1996, she appeared in the Sean Bean football film When Saturday Comes, then had a supporting role in the critically acclaimed film Welcome to Sarajevo. In 1997, Lloyd went to India where she took the anti-malaria drug mefloquine, which is contraindicated for people with mental disorders. Lloyd became sick on the trip and was also bitten by a stray dog. Lloyd attributes her subsequent mental breakdown to the combination of the drug and the attack. She lost two stone (13 kg) on the two-week trip, and developed obsessive–compulsive disorder (OCD) afterward. Despite this, she continued to work in film, appearing in Boogie Boy later that year. In 1998, she appeared in the film Brand New World, her last performance until she played the lead role in the independent thriller The Honeytrap in 2002, for which she received critical acclaim. The following year, she starred in the film Riverworld.

== Theatre career ==
Lloyd made her début on the stage in 1996 as Bella Kooling in Max Klapper at the Electric Cinema. In 1997, she was cast as Eliza Doolittle in the Albery Theatre production of Pygmalion, produced by Bill Kenwright. It was to be her West End debut. Shortly after rehearsals began, the original director Giles Havergal walked out, with reports he found Lloyd impossible to work with. Lloyd later left the production herself, citing an issue with another member of the cast. A journalist from The Independent subsequently commented that Lloyd was "in danger of becoming better known for the parts she has lost than those she has played". In 2003, she appeared as Ophelia in Hamlet at the Shakespeare Festival in Leeds and Brighton. Lloyd spoke positively of her experience in the play, though, according to The Daily Telegraph, one reviewer said her performance left audiences "visibly cringing".

== Later life ==
By 2003, Lloyd was struggling to find acting work. Cassandra Jardine from The Daily Telegraph stated that during an interview Lloyd frequently lost track of her sentences, stared into the distance and made sudden exclamations for no apparent reason. Lloyd attributed her mental state to the mefloquine exacerbating her existing anxiety and depression issues, and attributed her lack of regular acting work to these conditions and the stigma surrounding mental illness. By this time, Lloyd had lost contact with her Hollywood connections, and had had to sell the London flat which she had bought with her film earnings. In 2005, she was diagnosed with attention deficit disorder, and told Suzanne Kerrins from the Sunday Mirror that while she did receive film offers, she was focusing on getting better. She sometimes wished she had never been given the role in Wish You Were Here; it had been "both a blessing and a curse". Lloyd said she did not want anybody's sympathy, rather she just wanted "to feel well again".

In April 2013, Lloyd stated that she had been calm and stable for the past few years. She said she had no regrets regarding her life, though wished "that on a few occasions [she'd] been able to enjoy the experiences fully". In May 2013, Lloyd published an autobiography, Wish I Was There. Following the birth of her daughter in 2014, Lloyd stated she was happy and that her mental illness had "faded into the background".

== Personal life ==
Until 2005, Lloyd's only public long-term relationship was with Danny Huston. The couple began dating in 1993 and split in late 1994. In 2013, Lloyd said she had been sexually abused by a family friend when she was five years old, which was a major cause of her anxiety and depression. In October 2014, Lloyd had a daughter with her partner, vocalist Christian Jupp.

== Filmography ==
=== Film ===
Year	Title	Role	Notes
1987	Wish You Were Here	Lynda Mansell	
1989	Cookie	Carmela 'Cookie' Voltecki	
1989	In Country	Samantha Hughes	
1990	Chicago Joe and the Showgirl	Betty Jones	
1991	Scorchers	Splendid	
1992	A River Runs Through It	Jessie Burns	
1994	Override	Avis	Short
1995	Under the Hula Moon	Betty Wall	
1996	Livers Ain't Cheap	Lisa Tuttle	
1996	When Saturday Comes	Annie Doherty	
1996	Masculine Mescaline	Charlotte	Short
1996	Dead Girl	Mother	
1997	Welcome to Sarajevo	Annie McGee	
1998	Boogie Boy	Hester	
1998	Brand New World	Kim Patterson	
2002	The Honeytrap	Catherine	
2003	Hey Mr DJ	Angela	
2008	The Conservatory	Audition Monitor	Short
2016	No Reasons	Yvonne	

=== Television ===
Year	Title	Role	Notes
1988	Tickets for the Titanic	Polly	Episode: "Everyone a Winner"
1994	Override	Avis	TV short
1996	Strangers	Jennie	Episode: "Costumes"
2001	Dark Realm	Emma	Episode: "Emma's Boy"
2003	Riverworld	Alice Lidell Hargreaves	TV film

== Awards and nominations ==
Year	Organisation	Award	Film	Result	Ref.
1987	National Society of Film Critics	Best Actress	Wish You Were Here	Won	
1987	Evening Standard British Film Award	Best Actress	Wish You Were Here	Won	
1988	British Academy Film Awards	Best Actress	Wish You Were Here	Nominated	
