= Wish You Were Here (1987 film) =

- US theatrical release poster
- Directed by: David Leland
- Written by: David Leland
- Produced by: Sarah Radclyffe
- Starring: Emily Lloyd; Tom Bell; Jesse Birdsall; Geoffrey Durham; Pat Heywood; Geoffrey Hutchings
- Cinematography: Ian Wilson
- Edited by: George Akers
- Music by: Stanley Myers
- Production companies: Zenith Entertainment; Working Title Films; Channel Four Films
- Distributed by: Palace Pictures
- Release dates: May 1987 (Cannes); 24 July 1987 (United States); 3 December 1987 (United Kingdom)
- Running time: 92 minutes
- Country: United Kingdom
- Language: English
- Budget: £1.2 million
- Box office: $12 million

Wish You Were Here is a 1987 British comedy-drama film written and directed by David Leland and starring Emily Lloyd, Tom Bell, Geoffrey Hutchings, and Jesse Birdsall. The film follows a girl's coming-of-age in a small coastal town in postwar England. It is loosely based on the formative years of British madam Cynthia Payne. The original music score was composed by Stanley Myers.

The film received acclaim from critics, winning the International Federation of Film Critics prize at the 1987 Cannes Film Festival, a BAFTA award for Best Screenplay for director Leland, and the Best Actress Award for Lloyd from the National Society of Film Critics.

== Plot ==
In the early 1950s, sixteen-year-old Lynda Mansell lives in a small English seaside town with her widowed father Hubert and younger sister, Margaret. Feisty, outspoken, and bawdy, Lynda likes to shock other people with her histrionic behaviour (bicycling on the promenade with her skirt hiked up, inviting young men to compare her legs to Betty Grable's) and vulgar speech (her favourite insults are "Up yer bum!" and "Cock off!") which alienate her from her peers and her sister. Her father, Hubert, has his own barber shop and finds her employment at a variety of places, including a ladies' hair salon, a bus depot, and a fish and chip van, but her behaviour always loses her the job. Hubert, with whom Lynda has an adversarial relationship, unsuccessfully tries to correct Lynda's behaviour by taking her to a psychiatrist. Flashbacks reveal Lynda was close with her late mother.

Lynda returns the attentions of Brian, a boy she encounters on the promenade, and Dave, a young bus conductor to whom she loses her virginity, but she tires of Brian's immaturity, and her father warns off Dave, unbeknownst to Lynda. Meanwhile, Eric, an illegal back-street bookie and a middle-aged acquaintance of Hubert's, takes an interest in Lynda. She initially refuses Eric's crude advances, but as her relationship with her father grows increasingly strained, Lynda begins sleeping with Eric. When Hubert finds out, he tells Lynda how ashamed he is of her, and how her mother would be too if she were alive.

Lynda leaves her home to live with Eric, but instead of the affection and genuine love she craves, he ignores her tearful plea for a comforting cuddle and undresses her, seemingly only interested in her for sex. Lynda eventually leaves him and gets a job as a waitress at a tea room. Eric appears and speaks to Lynda, claiming he has missed her, but he stops pestering her when she reveals she is pregnant. Lynda considers an illegal abortion, but realises she cannot afford one.

Having learnt of his estranged daughter's pregnancy, Hubert arrives at the tea room demanding to speak to Lynda. Lynda denounces her father after he calls her a slut. Their argument escalates into a public spectacle, with Lynda climbing onto a table and shouting that she likes sex, railing about people's reluctance to talk about sex, and insulting customers. Lynda is fired on the spot, but a few customers applaud her rant.

Desperate and down-on-her-luck, Lynda meets with her Aunt Millie, who talks to Lynda about her options of getting an abortion (still illegal then) or giving up the baby for adoption, because women who have children out of wedlock are looked down upon in society, and no man will want her. Aunt Millie tells Lynda the choice is hers, but gives her enough money for an abortion. Lynda returns to an abortionist's house that she had previously visited, but hesitates at the doorstep and sees an old man and a little girl watching her.

Later, Lynda returns home, alighting from a bus at the bus garage where she had previously worked, with a baby and pram. She passes by her former haunts, including the promenade where she used to flash her legs at the boys. She deliberately pushes the pram and baby across the middle of a bowling green populated by players, Eric among them. The film ends with Lynda ringing the doorbell to Hubert's home and embracing her baby.

== Cast ==
- Emily Lloyd as Lynda Mansell
  - Charlotte Ball as young Lynda
- Geoffrey Hutchings as Hubert Mansell
- Chloë Leland as Margaret Mansell
  - Abigail Leland as young Margaret
- Tom Bell as Eric
- Pat Heywood as Auntie Millie
- Susan Skipper as Lynda's Mother
- Heathcote Williams as Dr Holroyd
- Jesse Birdsall as Dave
- Lee Whitlock as Brian
- Barbara Durkin as Valerie
- Kim McDermott as Vickie
- Geoffrey Durham as Harry Figgis

== Production ==
Director David Leland loosely based the film on Cynthia Payne's adolescence growing up on the Sussex coast. Personal Services, a film about Payne's experiences as an adult woman, was also written by Leland and released prior to Wish You Were Here. Wish You Were Here was filmed in the Sussex towns of Brighton, Worthing, and Bognor Regis over a period of six weeks.

The first day of filming was on Emily Lloyd's 16th birthday. During the scene where Lynda flashes her underwear to bus drivers, Leland hid makeup department staff among the extras to surprise the actress, capturing her genuine laughter on camera.

== Reception ==
Wish You Were Here has an overall approval rating of 85% on Rotten Tomatoes based on 33 reviews. Roger Ebert gave the film 3½ stars out of four, describing it as "a comedy with an angry undertone, a story of a free-spirited girl who holds a grudge against a time when such girls were a threat to society, to the interlocking forces of sexism and convention that conspired to break their spirits". Ebert praised Lloyd's performance as "one of the great debut roles for a young actress". Janet Maslin of The New York Times wrote, "Lynda's wild outbursts - toward the end of the film, she insults her lover and denounces her father in the genteel tea room where she works as a waitress - are as entertaining as they are cathartic, and Miss Lloyd delivers these strings of epithets as colorfully as Mr. Leland writes them. Miss Lloyd [manages] to seem both feisty and fragile...capturing the full emotional range of this complicated young girl".

Sheila Benson of the Los Angeles Times complimented the film's attention to period detail, as well as Leland's direction, citing "[he] has a reason, a purpose, a history for every character—and for every claustrophobic brick row-house or damp, echoing picture palace". She said the film manages to be funny and dark without becoming maudlin, becoming "something more than the words on a souvenir post card...a cry from the heart".

The film grossed $12 million worldwide, including £3 million at the UK box office and $3.3 million in the United States and Canada.

== Awards and honors ==
Award	Category	Name	Result	Ref.
Evening Standard British Film Awards	Best Actress	Emily Lloyd	Won	
National Society of Film Critics Awards	Best Actress	Emily Lloyd	Won	
1987 Cannes Film Festival	International Federation of Film Critics prize		Won	
BAFTA Awards	Best Screenplay	David Leland	Won	
BAFTA Awards	Best Actress	Emily Lloyd	Nominated	

== See also ==
- Personal Services
