= David Leland =

British film director (1941–2023)

- Born: 20 April 1941; Cambridge, England
- Died: 24 December 2023 (aged 82)
- Education: Royal Central School of Speech and Drama
- Occupations: Film director, screenwriter, actor

David Leland (20 April 1941 – 24 December 2023) was a British film director, screenwriter and actor who came to international fame with his directorial debut Wish You Were Here in 1987.

== Life and career ==
Leland initially trained as an actor at Central School of Speech and Drama. In 1963, he was part of the breakaway group of Central staff and students who formed Drama Centre London along with fellow students including actor and later theatre director Jack Shepherd and Jon Lord, later keyboard player and co-founder of rock band Deep Purple and Whitesnake. After several small parts as actor he began his collaboration with British television director Alan Clarke in 1981. Their film Made in Britain was well received and featured the first screen role of actor Tim Roth. Made in Britain won the Prix Italia (an international television award) in 1984. In 1986, Leland and director Neil Jordan co-wrote the screenplay for the thriller-drama Mona Lisa, featuring Bob Hoskins. With Jordan, he was nominated for BAFTA, Golden Globe and Writers Guild of America awards.

Leland then wrote Personal Services in 1986. It was directed by Terry Jones and concerned Cynthia Payne, a real-life British madam who ran a private brothel. Julie Walters took the leading role. While Personal Services dealt with the adult life of Cynthia Payne, Leland's next film, Wish You Were Here, concerned her teenage years. This film was a success at the 1987 Cannes Film Festival and it made the young British actress Emily Lloyd a star. It was awarded the FIPRESCI-Award at Cannes and the BAFTA for best screenplay.

In 1991, Leland directed the successful stage musical A Tribute to the Blues Brothers, which played on the West End and then toured for ten years in the UK and Australia.

Leland's next two films, Checking Out (with Jeff Daniels) and The Big Man (with Liam Neeson), were successful in the private market. In 1997, Leland co-wrote and directed The Land Girls starring Rachel Weisz and Anna Friel and, in 2000, wrote and directed Episode 6 of the HBO Miniseries Band of Brothers.

Leland was an early writer on the very first season of Peaky Blinders, helping to conceive the show.

In 2012, Leland joined the Showtime series The Borgias as co-showrunner and executive producer (alongside Neil Jordan, whom he had worked with on Mona Lisa), writing the last five episodes of its second season and directing its last two episodes. He described his stint as co-showrunner and executive producer as a "hands-on" experience and having to commit to extensive research on the Renaissance.

After the death of his friend George Harrison, Leland was closely involved in the former Beatle's memorial, Concert for George, and directed a cinematic documentary of the night to be put on general release, the DVD of which went platinum. The documentary also won a Grammy Award. He also directed the Dino De Laurentiis produced Virgin Territory, released in 2007.

Leland died on 24 December 2023, at the age of 82.

== Filmography ==
=== Actor ===
- Big Breadwinner Hog (television series) (1969) as Grange
- 1917 (1970) as Felix
- Scars of Dracula (1970) as 1st Policeman
- One Brief Summer (1970) as Peter
- The Last of the Mohicans (television series) (1971) as David the psalmodist
- The Pied Piper (1972) as Officer
- Gawain and the Green Knight (1973) as Humphrey
- Time Bandits (1981) as Puppeteer
- The Hitchhiker's Guide to the Galaxy (1981) (television series; episode #4) as Majikthise
- The Missionary (1982) as Long Haired Man at Gin Palace
- The Jewel in the Crown (1984) (television series; season 1, episode #10: An Evening at the Maharanee's) as Captain Purvis
- Personal Services (1987) as Mr. Pilkington
- When Saturday Comes (1996) as Priest

=== Screenwriter ===
- Made in Britain (Director: Alan Clarke)
- R.H.I.N.O.; Really Here in Name Only (Director: Jane Howell)
- Birth of a Nation (Director: Mike Newell)
- Flying Into the Wind (Director: Edward Bennett)
- Ligmalion - a Musical for The 80s (Director: Nigel Finch)
- Mona Lisa (Director: Neil Jordan)
- Personal Services (Director: Terry Jones)
- The White River Kid (Director: Arne Glimcher)
- The Borgias (TV series, also executive producer and episode director; creator: Neil Jordan)

=== Director ===
Films

- Wish You Were Here (also writer; 1987)
- Checking Out (1988)
- The Big Man (1990)
- The Land Girls (also co-writer; 1998)
- Concert for George (2003) (Documentary)
- Virgin Territory a.k.a. Mediaeval Pie (also writer; 2007)

Television

- Band of Brothers (part No. 6 "Bastogne") (2001)
- The Borgias (episode 9; also writer and executive producer of the series; 2012)

== Awards and nominations ==
- 2005 Grammy Award for Best Long Form Video (Concert for George)
- 2002 Emmy Award for Outstanding Directing for a Miniseries, Movie or a Dramatic Special (Band of Brothers)
- 2002 Christopher Award for best miniseries (Band of Brothers)
- 1988 BAFTA Award for best screenplay (Wish You Were Here)
- 1987 FIPRESCI Award International Cannes Film Festival (Wish You Were Here)
- 1987 Peter Sellers Award for Comedy (Evening Standard British Film Awards) (Wish You Were Here and Personal Services)
- 1986 Writers Guild of America Nomination (Mona Lisa)
- 1986 Golden Globe Nomination (Mona Lisa)
