= Personal Services =

1987 British comedy film directed by Terry Jones

- Theatrical release poster
- Directed by: Terry Jones
- Written by: David Leland
- Produced by: Tim Bevan
- Starring: Julie Walters; Alec McCowen; Shirley Stelfox
- Cinematography: Roger Deakins
- Edited by: George Akers
- Music by: John Du Prez
- Production company: Zenith Entertainment
- Distributed by: United International Pictures
- Release date: 3 April 1987 (London)
- Running time: 105 minutes
- Country: United Kingdom
- Language: English
- Budget: $2.7 million
- Box office: $5 million (UK/USA)

Personal Services is a 1987 British comedy film directed by Terry Jones and written by David Leland, about the rise of a madam of a suburban brothel which caters to older men. The story is inspired by the real experiences of Cynthia Payne, the "House of Cyn" madam.

== Plot ==
Christine Painter is a sexually naïve waitress and single mother who pays for her teenage son David's tuition by renting London flats to call girls. When a landlord confronts her for illegally subletting the flats and falling behind on the rent, Christine gives him a handjob in lieu of rent. After one of her "tenants", Rose, refuses to pay rent, Christine realises she can do sex work herself in the flat Rose abandons.

Christine is charged with soliciting and pleads guilty in court. Soon she hatches a scheme with fellow sex worker Shirley to provide strictly kinky services such as bondage and fetish roleplay to an upscale clientele. They rent a suburban house, where they are joined by their "maid" Dolly.

Christine attends her sister's wedding, where Dolly is accidentally exposed as transvestite to the groom's mother. Christine's father and sister angrily denounce her for spoiling the wedding.

Christine's father later visits the brothel for sex and reconciles with his daughter. The brothel enjoys brisk business, but soon attracts the notice of the police, who raid the house on Christmas Eve.

When Christine appears in court to be arraigned, she is relieved when she realises the judge is one of her main clients; she then imagines the courtroom filled with all of her clients as judges.

== Cast ==
- Julie Walters as Christine Painter
- Shirley Stelfox as Shirley
- Alec McCowen as Wing Commander Morten
- Danny Schiller as Dolly
- Tim Woodward as Timms
- Victoria Hardcastle as Rose
- Dave Atkins as Sydney
- Ewan Hooper as Edward
- Alan Bowyer as David Painter
- Antony Carrick as Edgar
- Beverley Foster as Elizabeth
- Leon Lissek as Mr. Popozogolou
- Michelle Collins as June
- Peter Cellier as Mr. Marples
- Benjamin Whitrow as Mr. Marsden
- Stephen Lewis as Mr. Dunkley
- John Shrapnel as Lionel
- Anthony Collin as Mr Webb
- Nigel Le Vaillant as The Man
- Ron Pember as Ron
- Arthur Whybrow as Max
- John Bailey as Mr Gardner
- Carolyn Allen as Carol
- Ivor Roberts as Glossop
- Arthur Cox as Lennox
- Stanley Lebor as Jones
- Sheila Gill as Mrs Winter
- Jagdish Kumar as Mr Shah
- Badi Uzzaman as Mr Patel
- Charlotte Seeley (aka Charlotte Alexandra) as Diane

== Reception ==
Personal Services opened at five cinemas in central London on 3 April 1987, and was the highest-grossing film in London for the week, with a gross of £57,775. It reached number one nationally in the UK after 10 weeks of release and was number one for two weeks. The film was the second highest-grossing British film of the year in the UK, behind only The Living Daylights, with a gross of £1,952,017 ($3.2 million). It grossed $1,744,164 in the United States and Canada.

On the review aggregator website Rotten Tomatoes, 67% of 6 critics' reviews are positive.

== Ban ==
The film was banned in the Republic of Ireland upon theatrical release (although the ban was lifted two months later by a vote of 6 to 2). At the time, there were four films that were banned in Ireland, and Jones had directed three of them (Personal Services, Monty Python's Life of Brian, and Monty Python's The Meaning of Life).
