= List of American films of 1987 =

This is a list of American films released in 1987.

== Box office ==
The highest-grossing American films released in 1987, by domestic box office gross revenue, are as follows:

Highest-grossing films of 1987
Rank	Title	Distributor	Domestic gross
1	Three Men and a Baby	Buena Vista	$167,780,960
2	Fatal Attraction	Paramount	$156,645,693
3	Beverly Hills Cop II	Paramount	$153,665,036
4	Good Morning, Vietnam	Buena Vista	$123,922,370
5	Moonstruck	MGM	$80,640,528
6	The Untouchables	Paramount	$76,270,454
7	The Secret of My Success	Universal	$66,995,000
8	Stakeout	Buena Vista	$65,673,233
9	Lethal Weapon	Warner Bros.	$65,207,127
10	The Witches of Eastwick	Warner Bros.	$63,766,510

== January–March ==
Opening		Title	Production company	Cast and crew	Ref.
J A N U A R Y	9	Assassination	Cannon Films	Peter R. Hunt (director); Richard Sale (screenplay); Charles Bronson, Jill Ireland, Stephen Elliott, Jan Gan Boyd, Randy Brooks, Michael Ansara, William Prince, Kathryn Leigh Scott, Jim McMullan, Charles Howerton, Robert Dowdell, Erik Stern, James Staley, Chris Alcaide	
J A N U A R Y	9	The Kindred	F/M Entertainment / Kindred Limited Partnership	Jeffrey Obrow, Stephen Carpenter (directors/screenplay); John Penney, Earl Ghaffari, Joseph Stefano (screenplay); David Allen Brooks, Amanda Pays, Talia Balsam, Kim Hunter, Rod Steiger, Timothy Gibbs, Peter Frechette, Julia Montgomery, Bennet Guillory, James Boeke, Bunky Z, Charles Grueber, Edgar Small, Randy Harrington, Ben Perry	
J A N U A R Y	9	Return to Horror High	New World Pictures / Balcor Film Investors	Bill Froehlich (director/screenplay); Mark Lisson, Dana Escalante, Greg H. Sims (screenplay); Vince Edwards, Brendan Hughes, Scott Jacoby, Lori Lethin, Philip McKeon, Alex Rocco, George Clooney, Andy Romano, Pepper Martin, Maureen McCormick, Michael Eric Kramer, Cliff Emmich, John Besmehn, Darcy DeMoss, Richard Brestoff, Al Fann, Panchito Gómez, Marvin J. McIntyre, Remy O'Neill, Will Etra	
J A N U A R Y	11	J. Edgar Hoover	Showtime Networks / Finnegan/Pinchuk Productions / RLC Productions	Robert L. Collins (director/screenplay); Treat Williams, Robert Alan Browne, Andrew Duggan, Louise Fletcher, Charles Hallahan, Art Hindle, James F. Kelly, Paul Kent, Charles Levin, John McLiam, Ford Rainey, Joe Regalbuto, David Ogden Stiers, William Traylor, Harvey Vernon, Mills Watson, Rip Torn, Walker Edmiston, Robert Harper, Erik Holland, Lee Kessler, F.J. O'Neil, Anthony Palmer, Gracia Lee, Cliff Murdock, Michael Griswold	
J A N U A R Y	16	The Bedroom Window	De Laurentiis Entertainment Group	Curtis Hanson (director/screenplay); Steve Guttenberg, Elizabeth McGovern, Isabelle Huppert, Paul Shenar, Carl Lumbly, Wallace Shawn, Frederick Coffin, Robert Schenkkan, Brad Greenquist, Robert Schenkkan, Maury Chaykin, Mark Margolis, Jodi Long, Leon Rippy, Sara Carlson, Richard K. Olsen	
J A N U A R Y	16	The Color Purple (re-release)	Warner Bros. Pictures	Steven Spielberg (director); Menno Meyjes (screenplay); Whoopi Goldberg, Danny Glover, Oprah Winfrey, Margaret Avery, Akosua Busia, Adolph Caesar, Willard Pugh, Rae Dawn Chong, Larry Fishburne, Carl Anderson, Grand L. Bush, Dana Ivey, Bennet Guillory, James Tillis, Leonard Jackson, Desreta Jackson, Táta Vega, Gayle King	
J A N U A R Y	16	Critical Condition	Paramount Pictures	Michael Apted (director); Denis Hamill, John Hamill (screenplay); Richard Pryor, Rachel Ticotin, Rubén Blades, Joe Mantegna, Bob Dishy, Sylvia Miles, Randall "Tex" Cobb, Jon Polito, Bob Saget, Garrett Morris, Brian Tarantina, Wesley Snipes, Joe Dallesandro, Joseph Ragno, Cigdem Onat	
J A N U A R Y	16	Wanted: Dead or Alive	New World Pictures	Gary Sherman (director); Michael Patrick Goodman, Brian Taggert (screenplay); Rutger Hauer, Gene Simmons, Robert Guillaume, Mel Harris, William Russ, Jerry Hardin, Hugh Gillin, Robert Harper, Eli Danker, Susan MacDonald, Joseph Nasser, Suzanne Wouk, Gerald Papasyan, Nick Faltas, Hammam Shafie	
J A N U A R Y	23	Jocks	Crown International Pictures / Shady Acres Entertainment	Steve Carver (director); David Oas (screenplay); Scott Strader, Perry Lang, Mariska Hargitay, Richard Roundtree, R. G. Armstrong, Stoney Jackson, Tom Shadyac, Christopher Lee, Trinidad Silva, Donald Gibb, Katherine Kelly Lang, Marianne Gravatte, Adam Mills, Christopher Murphy	
J A N U A R Y	23	The Stepfather	New Century Vista / ITC Entertainment	Joseph Ruben (director); Donald E. Westlake (screenplay); Terry O'Quinn, Jill Schoelen, Shelley Hack, Charles Layner, Stephen Shellen, Stephen E. Miller, Jeff Schultz, Gillian Barber, Robyn Stevan, Jackson Davies, Gabrielle Rose, Don S. Williams, Anna Hagan, Blu Mankuma, Richard Sargent, Margot Pinvidic, Rochelle Greenwood, Don MacKay, Dale Wilson, Gary Hetherington, Andrew Snider, Marie Stillin, Paul Batten, Sheila Paterson	
J A N U A R Y	30	Allan Quatermain and the Lost City of Gold	Cannon Films	Gary Nelson (director); Gene Quintano, Lee Reynolds (screenplay); Richard Chamberlain, Sharon Stone, James Earl Jones, Henry Silva, Robert Donner, Cassandra Peterson, Doghmi Larbi, Aileen Marson, Martin Rabbett, Emily Eby, Rory Kilalea, Andy Edwards	
J A N U A R Y	30	Outrageous Fortune	Touchstone Pictures / Silver Screen Partners / Interscope Communications	Arthur Hiller (director); Leslie Dixon (screenplay); Shelley Long, Bette Midler, Peter Coyote, Robert Prosky, George Carlin, John Schuck, Anthony Heald, Ji-Tu Cumbuka, Florence Stanley, Jerry Zaks, Diana Bellamy, Gary Morgan, Chris McDonald, Robert Pastorelli, Tony Epper, Carol Ann Susi, Johnny Sanchez, Ebbe Roe Smith	
J A N U A R Y	30	Radio Days	Orion Pictures	Woody Allen (director/screenplay); Woody Allen, Danny Aiello, Jeff Daniels, Mia Farrow, Seth Green, Robert Joy, Julie Kavner, Diane Keaton, Julie Kurnitz, Renée Lippin, Kenneth Mars, Josh Mostel, Tony Roberts, Wallace Shawn, Michael Tucker, David Warrilow, Dianne Wiest, Hy Anzell, Larry David, Denise Dumont, Todd Field, Kitty Carlisle Hart, Paul Herman, Judith Malina, Don Pardo, Martin Rosenblatt, Rebecca Schaeffer, Martin Sherman, Mike Starr, Kenneth Welsh, Sydney Blake, Leah Carrey, Gina DeAngelis, William Magerman, Brian Mannain, Helen Miller, Roger Schwinghammer	
F E B R U A R Y	6	Black Widow	20th Century Fox	Bob Rafelson (director); Ronald Bass (screenplay); Debra Winger, Theresa Russell, Sami Frey, Dennis Hopper, Nicol Williamson, Terry O'Quinn, Lois Smith, D.W. Moffett, Leo Rossi, Mary Woronov, Rutanya Alda, James Hong, Diane Ladd, Danny Kamekona, Wayne Heffley, Christian Clemenson, David Mamet, Gene Callahan, Thomas Hill, Anne Lockhart	
F E B R U A R Y	6	Dead of Winter	Metro-Goldwyn-Mayer	Arthur Penn (director); Marc Shmuger, Mark Malone (screenplay); Mary Steenburgen, Roddy McDowall, Jan Rubeš, William Russ, Ken Pogue, Wayne Robson, Paul Welsh, Mark Malone, Michael Copeman, Sam Malkin, Pamela Moller, Dwayne McLean	
F E B R U A R Y	6	From the Hip	De Laurentiis Entertainment Group	Bob Clark (director/screenplay); David E. Kelley (screenplay); Judd Nelson, Elizabeth Perkins, John Hurt, Ray Walston, Darren McGavin, Dan Monahan, David Alan Grier, Nancy Marchand, Allan Arbus, Edward Winter, Richard Zobel, Robert Irvin Elliott, Beatrice Winde, Art Hindle, Priscilla Pointer	
F E B R U A R Y	6	Light of Day	Tri-Star Pictures / Taft Entertainment	Paul Schrader (director/screenplay); Michael J. Fox, Gena Rowlands, Joan Jett, Michael McKean, Thomas G. Waites, Cherry Jones, Michael Dolan, Billy L. Sullivan, Jason Miller, Tom Irwin, Michael Rooker, Del Close, Trent Reznor, Exotic Birds, The Fabulous Thunderbirds, Ron Dean, Alan Poul, Paul J. Harkins, Cherise Haugen, Jerry Gideon, Yvette Heyden, Ray Bradford	
F E B R U A R Y	13	84 Charing Cross Road	Columbia Pictures / Brooksfilms	David Jones (director); Hugh Whitemore (screenplay); Anne Bancroft, Anthony Hopkins, Judi Dench, Maurice Denham, Eleanor David, Mercedes Ruehl, Daniel Gerroll, Wendy Morgan, Ian McNeice, J. Smith-Cameron, Connie Booth, Tony Todd	
F E B R U A R Y	13	Hannah and Her Sisters (re-release)	Orion Pictures	Woody Allen (director/screenplay); Woody Allen, Michael Caine, Mia Farrow, Carrie Fisher, Barbara Hershey, Lloyd Nolan, Maureen O'Sullivan, Daniel Stern, Max von Sydow, Dianne Wiest, Lewis Black, Julia Louis-Dreyfus, Christian Clemenson, Julie Kavner, J.T. Walsh, John Turturro, Rusty Magee, Sam Waterston, Richard Jenkins, Fred Melamed, Benno Schmidt, Joanna Gleason, Maria Chiara, Bobby Short, Beverly Peer, Bernie Leighton, Daisy Previn, Moses Farrow, Fletcher Previn, Soon-Yi Previn, Tony Roberts	
F E B R U A R Y	13	Mannequin	20th Century Fox / Gladden Entertainment	Michael Gottlieb (director/screenplay); Edward Rugoff (screenplay); Andrew McCarthy, Kim Cattrall, Estelle Getty, G.W. Bailey, James Spader, Meshach Taylor, Carole Davis, Steve Vinovich, Christopher Maher, Phyllis Newman	
F E B R U A R Y	13	Over the Top	Warner Bros. Pictures / Cannon Films	Menahem Golan (director); Stirling Silliphant, Sylvester Stallone (screenplay); Sylvester Stallone, Robert Loggia, Susan Blakely, David Mendenhall, Rick Zumwalt, Terry Funk, Jimmy Keegan, Allan Graf, Reggie Bennett, Scott Norton, John Brzenk, Chris McCarty, Bruce Way, Greg "Magic" Schwartz, John Braden, Allen Fisher, John Vreeland, Cleve Dean, Andrew "Cobra" Rhodes	
F E B R U A R Y	20	Death Before Dishonor	New World Pictures	Terry Leonard (director); John Gatliff (screenplay); Fred Dryer, Brian Keith, Joanna Pacuła, Paul Winfield, Joseph Gian, Sasha Mitchell, Peter Parros, Rockne Tarkington, Mohammad Bakri, Dan Chodos, Chaim Girafi, Tuvia Tavi, Yossi Ashdot	
F E B R U A R Y	20	Square Dance	Island Pictures / NBC Productions	Daniel Petrie (director); Alan Hines (screenplay); Winona Ryder, Jason Robards, Jane Alexander, Rob Lowe, Guich Koock, Deborah Richter	
F E B R U A R Y	27	A Nightmare on Elm Street 3: Dream Warriors	New Line Cinema / Heron Communications	Chuck Russell (director/screenplay); Wes Craven, Bruce Wagner, Frank Darabont (screenplay); Robert Englund, Heather Langenkamp, Craig Wasson, Patricia Arquette, Ken Sagoes, Rodney Eastman, Jennifer Rubin, Larry Fishburne, Bradley Gregg, Ira Heiden, Penelope Sudrow, Nan Martin, John Saxon, Priscilla Pointer, Clayton Landey, Brooke Bundy, Dick Cavett, Zsa Zsa Gabor, Stacey Alden, Paul Kent	
F E B R U A R Y	27	Number One with a Bullet	Cannon Films / Cineplex Odeon Films	Jack Smight (director); Gail Morgan Hickman, James Belushi, Andrew Kurtzman, Rob Riley (screenplay); Robert Carradine, Billy Dee Williams, Valerie Bertinelli, Peter Graves, Doris Roberts, Bobby Di Cicco, Ray Girardin, Mykelti Williamson, Jon Gries	
F E B R U A R Y	27	Some Kind of Wonderful	Paramount Pictures	Howard Deutch (director); John Hughes (screenplay); Eric Stoltz, Mary Stuart Masterson, Craig Sheffer, Lea Thompson, John Ashton, Elias Koteas, Molly Hagan, Maddie Corman, Jane Elliot, Candace Cameron, Chynna Phillips, Scott Coffey, Carmine Caridi, Lee Garlington	
F E B R U A R Y	28	The Quick and the Dead	HBO Pictures / The Joseph Cates Company	Robert Day (director); James Lee Barrett (screenplay); Sam Elliott, Tom Conti, Kate Capshaw, Kenny Morrison, Matt Clark, Patrick Kilpatrick, Larry Sellers, Hardy Rawls, Jerry Potter, Billy Streater, Del Shores, Jeffrey Meyer, R.L. Tolbert, Kurt D. Lott, Bill Stedman	
M A R C H	6	Angel Heart	Tri-Star Pictures / Carolco Pictures	Alan Parker (director/screenplay); Mickey Rourke, Robert De Niro, Lisa Bonet, Charlotte Rampling, Stocker Fontelieu, Brownie McGhee, Michael Higgins, Elizabeth Whitcraft, Dann Florek, Pruitt Taylor Vince, Charles Gordone, Kathleen Wilhoite	
M A R C H	6	Lethal Weapon	Warner Bros. Pictures / Silver Pictures	Richard Donner (director); Shane Black (screenplay); Mel Gibson, Danny Glover, Gary Busey, Mitchell Ryan, Tom Atkins, Darlene Love, Jackie Swanson, Traci Wolfe, Steve Kahan, Mary Ellen Trainor, Ed O'Ross, Lycia Naff, Jimmie F. Skaggs, Al Leong, Jack Thibeau, Grand L. Bush, Henry Brown, Sven-Ole Thorsen, Selma Archerd, Don Gordon, Blackie Dammett, Gilles Kohler, Renée Estevez, Kathleen Harrison, Mic Rodgers, Joan Severance, Alastair Sim, Chris Tashima, Norman D. Wilson, Damon Hines, Ebonie Smith, Donald Gooden	
M A R C H	13	Evil Dead II	De Laurentiis Entertainment Group / Embassy Communications / Renaissance Pictures	Sam Raimi (director/screenplay); Scott Spiegel (screenplay); Bruce Campbell, Sarah Berry, Dan Hicks, Kassie Wesley, Ted Raimi, Richard Domeier, Denise Bixler, John Peaks, Lou Hancock, William Preston Robertson, Snowy Winters	
M A R C H	13	Tin Men	Touchstone Pictures / Silver Screen Partners	Barry Levinson (director/screenplay); Richard Dreyfuss, Danny DeVito, Barbara Hershey, John Mahoney, Jackie Gayle, Stanley Brock, Seymour Cassel, Bruno Kirby, J.T. Walsh, Richard Portnow, Matt Craven, Alan Blumenfeld, Brad Sullivan, Michael Tucker, Deirdre O'Connell, Michael Willis, Susan Duvall, Ralph Tabakin, Walt MacPherson, Sheila McCauley, Penny Nichols, Norma Posner	
M A R C H	18	Raising Arizona	20th Century Fox	Joel and Ethan Coen (directors/screenplay); Nicolas Cage, Holly Hunter, Trey Wilson, John Goodman, William Forsythe, Sam McMurray, Frances McDormand, Randall "Tex" Cobb	
M A R C H	20	Burglar	Warner Bros. Pictures	Hugh Wilson (director/screenplay); Jeph Loeb, Matthew Weisman (screenplay); Whoopi Goldberg, Bobcat Goldthwait, G.W. Bailey, Lesley Ann Warren, James Handy, John Goodman, Anne De Salvo, Elizabeth Ruscio, Vyto Ruginis, Larry Mintz, Raye Birk, Nathan Davis, Thom Bray, Ethan Phillips, Eric Poppick, Scott Lincoln	
M A R C H	20	Hollywood Shuffle	The Samuel Goldwyn Company	Robert Townsend (director/screenplay); Keenen Ivory Wayans, Dom Irrera (screenplay); Robert Townsend, Anne-Marie Johnson, Craigus R. Johnson, Helen Martin, Starletta DuPois, David McKnight, Keenen Ivory Wayans, Lou D. Washington, Brad Sanders, John Witherspoon, Dom Irrera, Eugene Robert Glazer, Grand L. Bush, Damon Wayans, Lisa Mende, Conni Marie Brazelton, Sena Ayn Black, Jesse Aragon, Verda Bridges	
M A R C H	20	Street Smart	Cannon Films	Jerry Schatzberg (director); David Freeman (screenplay); Christopher Reeve, Kathy Baker, Mimi Rogers, Andre Gregory, Morgan Freeman, Jay Patterson, Anna Maria Horsford	
M A R C H	27	Blind Date	Tri-Star Pictures	Blake Edwards (director); Dale Launer (screenplay); Bruce Willis, Kim Basinger, John Larroquette, William Daniels, George Coe, Mark Blum, Phil Hartman, Stephanie Faracy, Alice Hirson, Stanley Jordan, Graham Stark, Joyce Van Patten, Barry Sobel, Armin Shimerman, Brian George, Jeannie Elias, Dick Durock, Sab Shimono	
M A R C H	27	Withnail and I	HandMade Films	Bruce Robinson (director/screenplay); Richard E. Grant, Paul McGann, Richard Griffiths, Ralph Brown, Michael Elphick, Daragh O'Malley, Noel Johnson, Irene Sutcliffe, Llewellyn Rees, Eddie Tagoe, Michael Wardle, Una Brandon-Jones, Robert Oates, Anthony Wise	

== April–June ==
Opening		Title	Production company	Cast and crew	Ref.
A P R I L	3	Police Academy 4: Citizens on Patrol	Warner Bros. Pictures	Jim Drake (director); Gene Quintano (screenplay); Steve Guttenberg, Bubba Smith, Michael Winslow, David Graf, Tim Kazurinsky, Sharon Stone, Marion Ramsey, Lance Kinsey, Leslie Easterbrook, Colleen Camp, G.W. Bailey, Bobcat Goldthwait, George Gaynes, Brian Tochi, George R. Robertson, Andrew Paris, Derek McGrath, Scott Thomson, Billie Bird, David Spade, Brian Backer, Tab Thacker, Corinne Bohrer, Randall "Tex" Cobb, Michael McManus, Arthur Batanides, Jackie Joseph, Jack Creley, Kay Hawtrey, TJ Scott, Paul Maslansky, Steve Caballero, Chris Miller, Tommy Guerrero, Lance Mountain, Mike McGill, Tony Hawk	
A P R I L	10	The Aristocats (re-release)	Walt Disney Pictures	Wolfgang Reitherman (director); Ken Anderson, Larry Clemmons, Eric Cleworth, Vance Gerry, Julius Svendsen, Frank Thomas, Ralph Wright (screenplay); Phil Harris, Eva Gabor, Sterling Holloway, Scatman Crothers, Paul Winchell, Lord Tim Hudson, Thurl Ravenscroft, Dean Clark, Liz English, Gary Dubin, Vito Scotti, Nancy Kulp, Pat Buttram, George Lindsey, Hermione Baddeley, Charles Lane, Roddy Maude-Roxby, Monica Evans, Carole Shelley, Bill Thompson, Peter Renaday, Ruth Buzzi, June Foray, Robie Lester, Clarence Nash	
A P R I L	10	Making Mr. Right	Orion Pictures / Barry & Enright Productions	Susan Seidelman (director); Floyd Byars, Laurie Frank (screenplay); John Malkovich, Ann Magnuson, Glenne Headly, Ben Masters, Laurie Metcalf, Polly Bergen, Hart Bochner, Polly Draper, Christian Clemenson, Harsh Nayyar, Susan Berman, Merwin Goldsmith	
A P R I L	10	The Secret of My Success	Universal Pictures / Rastar	Herbert Ross (director); Jim Cash, Jack Epps Jr., AJ Carothers (screenplay); Michael J. Fox, Helen Slater, Richard Jordan, Margaret Whitton, John Pankow, Christopher Murney, Gerry Bamman, Fred Gwynne, Carol Ann Susi, Elizabeth Franz, Drew Snyder, Susan Kellermann, Barton Heyman, Mercedes Ruehl, Rex Robbins, Christopher Durang, Bill Fagerbakke, John Bowman, Don Amendolia, Judith Malina, Mark Margolis, Rick Aviles, John Capodice, Luis Antonio Ramos, Cindy Crawford, Bruce McGill, Tatjana Patitz, Tucker Smallwood, Ira B. Wheeler, Ashley J. Laurence, MacIntyre Dixon, Jack Davidson	
A P R I L	10	Silent Night, Deadly Night Part 2	Silent Night Releasing Corporation / Ascot Entertainment	Lee Harry (director/screenplay); Joseph H. Earle (screenplay); Eric Freeman, James L. Newman, Elizabeth Kaitan, Corrine Gelfan, Michael Combatti, Jill K. Allen, Ken Weichert, Ron Moriarty, Frank Novak, Randall Boffman, Joanne White, Lenny Rose, Nadya Wynd, Darrel Guilbeau, Brian Michael Henley	
A P R I L	10	Three for the Road	New Century Vista	Bill L. Norton (director); Richard Martini (screenplay); Charlie Sheen, Alan Ruck, Kerri Green, Sally Kellerman, Blair Tefkin, Raymond J. Barry, Bert Remsen, James Avery	
A P R I L	17	Project X	20th Century Fox	Jonathan Kaplan (director); Lawrence Lasker, Stanley Weiser (screenplay); Matthew Broderick, Helen Hunt, William Sadler, Jonathan Stark, Johnny Ray McGhee, Robin Gammell, Stephen Lang, Jean Smart, Daniel Roebuck, Marvin J. McIntyre, Harry Northup, Michael Eric Kramer, Dick Miller, Jules Sylvester, Richard Cummings Jr., Robert Lee Minor, Ken Lerner, Michael McGrady, Deborah Offner, Lance E. Nichols, Ken Sagoes, Richard Paul	
A P R I L	17	Rumpelstiltskin	Cannon Films	David Irving (director/screenplay); Amy Irving, Clive Revill, Priscilla Pointer, Billy Barty	
A P R I L	17	Wild Thing	Atlantic Releasing Corporation	Max Reid (director); John Sayles (screenplay); Robert Knepper, Kathleen Quinlan, Robert Davi, Maury Chaykin, Betty Buckley, Guillaume Lemay-Thivierge, Clark Johnson, Cree Summer, Shawn Levy, Sean Hewitt, Teddy Abner	
A P R I L	19	The Last Innocent Man	HBO Pictures	Roger Spottiswoode (director); Dan Bronson (screenplay); Ed Harris, Roxanne Hart, David Suchet, Bruce McGill, Darrell Larson, Clarence Williams III, Robert Lesser, Meshach Taylor, Michael Durrell, Charles Lampkin, Rose Gregorino, Joe Mays, Frank Koppala, Robert Biheller	
A P R I L	20	G.I. Joe: The Movie	Celebrity Home Entertainment / Hasbro / Sunbow Productions / Marvel Productions / Toei Animation Co., Ltd.	Don Jurwich (director); Ron Friedman (screenplay); Don Johnson, Burgess Meredith, Sgt. Slaughter, Charlie Adler, Shuko Akune, Jack Angel, Jackson Beck, Michael Bell, Gregg Berger, Earl Boen, Arthur Burghardt, Corey Burton, William Callaway, François Chau, Peter Cullen, Brian Cummings, Jennifer Darling, Laurie Faso, Hank Garrett, Dick Gautier, Ed Gilbert, Dan Gilvezan, Kene Holliday, John Hostetter, Buster Jones, Chris Latta, Chuck McCann, Michael McConnohie, Rob Paulsen, Patrick Pinney, Poncie Ponce, Bill Ratner, Neil Ross, Kristoffer Tabori, B.J. Ward, Vernee Watson-Johnson, Lee Weaver, Frank Welker, Zack Hoffman, Morgan Lofting, Mary McDonald-Lewis, Ron Ortiz, Lisa Raggio, Brad Sanders, Ted Schwartz, Stan Wojno Jr.	
A P R I L	24	Extreme Prejudice	Tri-Star Pictures / Carolco Pictures	Walter Hill (director); John Milius, Fred Rexer, Deric Washburn, Harry Kleiner (screenplay); Nick Nolte, Powers Boothe, Michael Ironside, María Conchita Alonso, Rip Torn, Clancy Brown, William Forsythe, John Dennis Johnston, Marco Rodríguez, Luis Contreras, Tommy "Tiny" Lister Jr., Mickey Jones, Thomas Rosales Jr., Matt Mulhern, Larry B. Scott, Dan Tullis, Jr.	
A P R I L	24	My Demon Lover	New Line Cinema	Charlie Loventhal (director); Leslie Ray (screenplay); Scott Valentine, Michele Little, Robert Trebor, Alan Fudge, Gina Gallego, Calvert DeForest, Arnold Johnson, Marsha Clark, Karl Johnson, Lin Shaye, Tasia Valenza, Dan Patrick Brady, Eva Charney, Kennedy Clarke, Steven Hutchins, Franis James, Peewee Piemonte, Leslie Ray	
M A Y	1	The Allnighter	Universal Pictures	Tamar Simon Hoffs (director/screenplay); M.L. Kessler (screenplay); Susanna Hoffs, Dedee Pfeiffer, Joan Cusack, James Anthony Shanta, John Terlesky, Michael Ontkean, Pam Grier, Christian Roerig, Doug Choo	
M A Y	1	American Ninja 2: The Confrontation	Cannon Films	Sam Firstenberg (director); James Booth, Gary Conway (screenplay); Michael Dudikoff, Steve James, Larry Poindexter, Gary Conway, Jeff Celentano, Jeff Weston, Michelle Botes, Mike Stone	
M A Y	1	Creepshow 2	New World Pictures	Michael Gornick (director); George A. Romero, Lucille Fletcher (screenplay); Lois Chiles, George Kennedy, Dorothy Lamour, Tom Savini, Joe Silver, Holt McCallany, Frank Salsedo, Donald Patrick Harvey, Will Sampson, Dean Smith, Paul Satterfield, Page Hannah, David Beecroft, Tom Wright, Stephen King, Domenick John, Philip Dore, David Holbrook, Dan Kamin, Shirley Sonderegger, Jeremy Green, Daniel Beer, Richard Parks	
M A Y	1	Malone	Orion Pictures	Harley Cokeliss (director); Christopher Frank, Rudolph Wurlitzer (screenplay); Burt Reynolds, Kenneth McMillan, Cynthia Gibb, Lauren Hutton, Cliff Robertson, Scott Wilson, Alex Diakun, Philip Anglim, Tracey Walter, Dennis Burkley, Brooks Gardner	
M A Y	8	Gardens of Stone	Tri-Star Pictures / Zoetrope Studios	Francis Ford Coppola (director); Ronald Bass (screenplay); James Caan, Anjelica Huston, James Earl Jones, D.B. Sweeney, Dean Stockwell, Mary Stuart Masterson, Dick Anthony Williams, Lonette McKee, Sam Bottoms, Elias Koteas, Larry Fishburne, Casey Siemaszko, Peter Masterson, Carlin Glynn	
M A Y	8	Hot Pursuit	Paramount Pictures / Interaccess Film Distribution / RKO Pictures	Steven Lisberger (director/screenplay); Steven Carabatsos (screenplay); John Cusack, Robert Loggia, Wendy Gazelle, Jerry Stiller, Monte Markham, Shelley Fabares, Ben Stiller, Keith David, Dah-ve Chodan, Ursaline Bryant, Paul Bates, Terence Cooper, Martin LaSalle	
M A Y	8	River's Edge	Island Pictures / Hemdale Film Corporation	Tim Hunter (director); Neal Jimenez (screenplay); Crispin Glover, Keanu Reeves, Ione Skye Leitch, Roxana Zal, Daniel Roebuck, Joshua Miller, Dennis Hopper, Josh Richman, Tom Bower, Constance Forslund, Leo Rossi, Jim Metzler, Taylor Negron, Danyi Deats, Christopher Peters, Phillip Brock, Yuzo Nishihara, Richard Richcreek	
M A Y	8	Sweet Lorraine	Angelika Films / Autumn Pictures	Steve Gomer (director); Michael Zettler, Shelly Altman (screenplay); Maureen Stapleton, Trini Alvarado, Lee Richardson, John Bedford Lloyd, Freddie Roman, Giancarlo Esposito, Edith Falco, Todd Graff, Evan Handler, Mindy Morgenstern, Tamara Tunie, Boris Sichkin, Paula Trueman, Annie Korzen, Maurice Brenner	
M A Y	15	The Gate	New Century Vista / Alliance Entertainment	Tibor Takács (director); Michael Nankin (screenplay); Stephen Dorff, Kelly Rowan, Jennifer Irwin, Ingrid Veninger, Linda Goranson, Andrew Gunn, Christa Denton, Louis Tripp, Sean Fagan, Carl Kraines, Deborah Grover, Scot Denton	
M A Y	15	Ishtar	Columbia Pictures	Elaine May (director/screenplay); Dustin Hoffman, Warren Beatty, Isabelle Adjani, Charles Grodin, Jack Weston, Tess Harper, Carol Kane, Aharon Ipalé, Fred Melamed, David Margulies, Bill Bailey, Christine Rose, Matt Frewer, Warren Clarke, Fuad Hageb, Rose Arrick, Julie Garfield	
M A Y	15	Personal Services	Vestron Pictures / Zenith Entertainment	Terry Jones (director); David Leland (screenplay); Julie Walters, Alec McCowen, Shirley Stelfox, Tim Woodward, Dave Atkins, Ewan Hooper, Leon Lissek, Michelle Collins, Peter Cellier, Benjamin Whitrow, Stephen Lewis, John Shrapnel, Nigel Le Vaillant, Ron Pember, Arthur Whybrow, John Bailey, Ivor Roberts, Arthur Cox, Stanley Lebor, Badi Uzzaman, Charlotte Seeley, Danny Schiller, Victoria Hardcastle, Alan Bowyer, Antony Carrick, Beverley Foster, Anthony Collin, Carolyn Allen, Sheila Gill, Jagdish Kumar	
M A Y	16	Conspiracy: The Trial of the Chicago 8	HBO Showcase	Jeremy Kagan (director/screenplay); Peter Boyle, Robert Carradine, Elliott Gould, Robert Loggia, Brian Benben, Michael Lembeck, Carl Lumbly, Barry Miller, David Clennon, Harris Yulin, David Opatoshu, Martin Sheen, Ron Rifkin, Billy Zane, Brandon Quintin Adams, James Avery, Val Avery, Tom Bower, Alyson Croft, John Finnegan, Paul Linke, John O'Banion, Carolyn Seymour, Dan Shor, Rennie Davis, David Dellinger, John Froines, Tom Hayden, Abbie Hoffman, William Kunstler, Jerry Rubin, Bobby Seale, Lee Weiner, Leonard Weinglass, Richard Nixon, Ronald Reagan, Robert Fieldsteel, David Kagen, Tracey Joham	
M A Y	20	Beverly Hills Cop II	Paramount Pictures / Don Simpson/Jerry Bruckheimer Films	Tony Scott (director); Larry Ferguson, Warren Skaaren (screenplay); Eddie Murphy, Judge Reinhold, Jürgen Prochnow, John Ashton, Ronny Cox, Brigitte Nielsen, Allen Garfield, Brian O'Connor, Dean Stockwell, Gil Hill, Gilbert Gottfried, Paul Reiser, Paul Guilfoyle, Robert Ridgely, Alice Adair, Glenn Withrow, Tom Bower, Hugh Hefner, Todd Susman, Chris Rock, Robert Pastorelli, Kopi Sotiropulos, Tommy "Tiny" Lister Jr., John Hostetter, Rudy Ramos, Ritch Shydner, Ola Ray, Alana Soares, Venice Kong, Luann Lee, Rebecca Ferratti, Kymberly Paige, Kymberly Herrin, Kari Whitman	
M A Y	22	Amazing Grace and Chuck	Tri-Star Pictures	Mike Newell (director); David Field (screenplay); Jamie Lee Curtis, Gregory Peck, William Petersen, Joshua Zuehlke, Lee Richardson, Alex English, Alan Autry, Michael Bowen, Frances Conroy, Red Auerbach, Dean Alexander, Jim Allen	
M A Y	22	The Chipmunk Adventure	The Samuel Goldwyn Company	Janice Karman (director/screenplay); Ross Bagdasarian Jr. (screenplay); Ross Bagdasarian Jr., Janice Karman, Dody Goodman, Anthony De Longis, Susan Tyrrell, Ken Sansom, Frank Welker, Nancy Cartwright, Philip L. Clarke, Charlie Adler, Patrick Pinney, Mona Marshall, Jan Rabson, Jack Angel, Mel Blanc, Laura Summer, George Poulos, Kathy Ritter	
M A Y	22	Ernest Goes to Camp	Touchstone Pictures / Silver Screen Partners	John R. Cherry III (director/screenplay); Coke Sams (screenplay); Jim Varney, Victoria Racimo, John Vernon, Iron Eyes Cody, Lyle Alzado, Gailard Sartain, Daniel Butler, Scott Menville, Jacob Vargas, Todd Loyd, Hakim Abdulsamad, Richard Speight, Jr., Patrick Day, Danny Capri, Eddy Schumacher, Andy Woodworth, Buck Ford, Larry Black, Hugh Sinclair, Johnson West, Jean Wilson, Ivan Green, Christian Haas, Brenda Haynes, Charlie Lamb, Mac Bennett	
M A Y	23	Long Gone	HBO Pictures	Martin Davidson (director); Michael Norell (screenplay); William Petersen, Virginia Madsen, Dermot Mulroney, Larry Riley, Katy Boyer, Henry Gibson, Teller, Robert Easton, Joel Murray, David Langston Smyrl, Edward Blatchford, Nardi Contreras, Panchito Gómez, Guich Koock, Will Zahm, Steve Zurk, Kenneth Eriksen, Neil DeGroot, Ken Dominguez, Mike McKown, John Bauldrey, Ken Krannick, Kathryn Hasty, Tracy Roberts, Hazen Gifford, William Wohrman, Tony Vila Jr., Jim Rabe, Ronn Allen, Monica Moran	
J U N E	5	Cyclone	CineTel Films	Fred Olen Ray (director/screenplay); Paul Garson, T.L. Lankford (screenplay); Heather Thomas, Jeffrey Combs, Martin Landau, Dar Robinson, Martine Beswick, Robert Quarry, Huntz Hall, Troy Donahue	
J U N E	5	Harry and the Hendersons	Universal Pictures / Amblin Entertainment	William Dear (director/screenplay); William E. Martin, Ezra D. Rappaport (screenplay); John Lithgow, Melinda Dillon, Don Ameche, David Suchet, Margaret Langrick, Joshua Rudoy, Lainie Kazan, Kevin Peter Hall, M. Emmet Walsh, William Dear, Laurie O'Brien, John Bloom, Rick Baker, Fred Newman, Tom Hester, Tim Lawrence, Mitch Laue	
J U N E	5	The Untouchables	Paramount Pictures	Brian De Palma (director); David Mamet (screenplay); Kevin Costner, Charles Martin Smith, Andy García, Robert De Niro, Sean Connery, Patricia Clarkson, Billy Drago, Richard Bradford, Jack Kehoe, Brad Sullivan, Del Close, Clifton James, Donald Patrick Harvey, Vito D'Ambrosio, Larry Brandenburg, Chelcie Ross, Robert Miranda, John Barrowman	
J U N E	12	The Believers	Orion Pictures	John Schlesinger (director); Mark Frost (screenplay); Martin Sheen, Helen Shaver, Robert Loggia, Richard Masur, Harley Cross, Jimmy Smits, Elizabeth Wilson, Harris Yulin, Lee Richardson, Janet-Laine Green, Raúl Dávila, Malick Bowens, Carla Pinza, Geoffrey Kellett	
J U N E	12	Million Dollar Mystery	De Laurentiis Entertainment Group	Richard Fleischer (director); Rudy De Luca, Tim Metcalfe, Miguel Tejada-Flores (screenplay); Tom Bosley, Eddie Deezen, Wendy Sherman, Rick Overton, Douglas Emerson, Royce D. Applegate, Daniel McDonald, Penny Baker, Kevin Pollak, Jamie Alcroft, Rich Hall, Hard Boiled Haggerty, Greg Travis, Rudy De Luca, Mona Lyden, Mack Dryden, Jack Carpenter, Pam Matteson, Tawny Fere, LaGena Hart, Gail Neely, Bob Schott, Peter Pitofsky, Tommy Sledge, Christopher Cary, Paul Stader	
J U N E	12	Predator	20th Century Fox / Silver Pictures / Davis Entertainment	John McTiernan (director); Jim Thomas, John Thomas (screenplay); Arnold Schwarzenegger, Carl Weathers, Elpidia Carrillo, Bill Duke, Jesse Ventura, Sonny Landham, Richard Chaves, R.G. Armstrong, Shane Black, Kevin Peter Hall, Steve Boyum, Franco Columbu, Peter Cullen, Henry Kingi, Sven-Ole Thorsen	
J U N E	12	The Witches of Eastwick	Warner Bros. Pictures / Barris Industries	George Miller (director); Michael Cristofer (screenplay); Jack Nicholson, Cher, Susan Sarandon, Michelle Pfeiffer, Veronica Cartwright, Richard Jenkins, Carel Struycken, Keith Jochim, Becca Lish	
J U N E	19	Benji the Hunted	Walt Disney Pictures	Joe Camp (director/screenplay); Red Steagall, Frank Inn, Nancy Francis, Joe Camp, Steve Zanolini, Mike Francis, Ben Vaughn, Karen Thorndike, Guy Hovis, Ben Morgan	
J U N E	19	Make Mine Music (re-release)	Walt Disney Pictures / RKO Radio Pictures	Jack Kinney, Clyde Geronimi, Hamilton Luske, Joshua Meador, Robert Cormack (directors); Nelson Eddy, Dinah Shore, Benny Goodman, Andrews Sisters, Jerry Colonna, Andy Russell, Sterling Holloway, David Lichine, Tania Riabouchinskaya, Lichine, Pied Piers, The King's Men, The Ken Darby's Chorus	
J U N E	19	Roxanne	Columbia Pictures	Fred Schepisi (director); Steve Martin (screenplay); Steve Martin, Daryl Hannah, Shelley Duvall, Rick Rossovich, Fred Willard, Michael J. Pollard, John Kapelos, Max Alexander, Damon Wayans, Matt Lattanzi, Jean Sincere, Ritch Shydner, Kevin Nealon, Brian George, Maureen Murphy, Heidi Sorenson, Steve Mittleman, Shandra Beri, Thom Curley	
J U N E	26	Dragnet	Universal Pictures	Tom Mankiewicz (director/screenplay); Dan Aykroyd, Alan Zweibel (screenplay); Dan Aykroyd, Tom Hanks, Christopher Plummer, Harry Morgan, Alexandra Paul, Dabney Coleman, Jack O'Halloran, Elizabeth Ashley, Kathleen Freeman, Bruce Gray, Lenka Peterson, Lisa Aliff, Nina Arvesen, Peter Aykroyd, Juliana Donald, Ava Fabian, Kimberly Foster, Maurice Marsac, Casey Sander, Billy Ray Sharkey, Jimmie F. Skaggs, Dona Speir, Meg Wyllie, Broderick Crawford, Matthias Hues, Ethelreda Leopold, Harry Perry, Shannon Tweed	
J U N E	26	Spaceballs	Metro-Goldwyn-Mayer	Mel Brooks (director/screenplay); Ronny Graham, Thomas Meehan (screenplay); Mel Brooks, John Candy, Rick Moranis, Bill Pullman, Daphne Zuniga, George Wyner, Dick Van Patten, Joan Rivers, Michael Winslow, John Hurt, Sal Viscuso, Ronny Graham, Jim J. Bullock, Leslie Bevis, Michael Pniewski, Sandy Helberg, Stephen Tobolowsky, Dey Young, Rhonda Shear, Robert Prescott, Jack Riley, Tom Dreesen, Rudy De Luca, Rick Ducommun, Ken Olfson, Bryan O'Byrne, Tommy Swerdlow, Tim Russ, Ed Gale, Antonio Hoyos, Felix Silla, Arturo Gil, Tony Cox, John Kennedy Hayden, Johnny Silver, Brenda Strong, Dom DeLuise, Phil Hartman, Corey Burton, Tress MacNeille, Jerry Maren, Terence Marsh, Thomas Meehan, John Paragon, Rob Paulsen, Dick Warlock, Michael York	
J U N E	26	Straight to Hell	Island Pictures	Alex Cox (director/screenplay); Dick Rude (screenplay); Dick Rude, Sy Richardson, Courtney Love, Joe Strummer, Dennis Hopper, Xander Berkeley, Grace Jones, Elvis Costello, Jim Jarmusch, Miguel Sandoval, Jennifer Balgobin, Sara Sugarman, Biff Yeager, Shane MacGowan, Spider Stacy, Terry Woods, Kathy Burke, Del Zamora, Edward Tudor-Pole, Graham Fletcher-Cook, Anne-Marie Ruddock, Zander Schloss, Fox Harris	
J U N E	28	The Lion of Africa	HBO Pictures	Kevin Connor (director); Bruce Franklin Singer (screenplay); Brian Dennehy, Brooke Adams, Yosef Shiloach, Don Warrington, Carl Andrews, Tony Msalame, Oliver Litondo, Edwin Mahinda, Katherine Schofield, Joe Chege, William Tsuma, Rose Maruru, Mwangangi Ndunda, Margaret Averdling	

== July–September ==
Opening		Title	Production company	Cast and crew	Ref.
J U L Y	3	Adventures in Babysitting	Touchstone Pictures / Silver Screen Partners	Chris Columbus (director); David Simkins (screenplay); Elisabeth Shue, Keith Coogan, Anthony Rapp, Maia Brewton, Penelope Ann Miller, Bradley Whitford, Calvin Levels, George Newbern, John Davis Chandler, Ron Canada, John Ford Noonan, Albert Collins, Vincent Phillip D'Onofrio, Southside Johnny, Lolita David, Clark Johnson	
J U L Y	3	Innerspace	Warner Bros. Pictures / Amblin Entertainment	Joe Dante (director); Jeffrey Boam, Chip Poser (screenplay); Dennis Quaid, Martin Short, Meg Ryan, Kevin McCarthy, Fiona Lewis, Robert Picardo, Vernon Wells, Henry Gibson, William Schallert, Wendy Schaal, Harold Sylvester, John Hora, Orson Bean, Kevin Hooks, Dick Miller, Kathleen Freeman, Mark L. Taylor, Archie Hahn, Kenneth Tobey, Joe Flaherty, Andrea Martin, Jenny Gago, Grainger Hines, Richard McGonagle, Terence McGovern, Rance Howard, Chuck Jones, Alan Blumenfeld, Herb Mitchell, Neil Ross, Charles Aidman, Joe Dante, Tom Willett	
J U L Y	10	The Brave Little Toaster	Hyperion Pictures / The Kushner-Locke Company / ITC Entertainment / Skouras Pictures	Jerry Rees (director/screenplay); Joe Ranft (screenplay); Deanna Oliver, Timothy E. Day, Jon Lovitz, Timothy Stack, Thurl Ravenscroft, Phil Hartman, Wayne Kaatz, Collette Savage, Joe Ranft, Jim Jackman, Jerry Rees, Jonathan Benair, Judy Toll, Mindy Sterling, Randy Bennett, Danny Mann, Susie Allanson, Randall William Cook, Louis Conti, Beth Anderson, Joe Pizzulo, Janice Liebhart, Darryl Phinnessee, Pat Ericson, Gary Falcone, Roger Freeland	
J U L Y	10	Full Metal Jacket	Warner Bros. Pictures / Hawk Films	Stanley Kubrick (director/screenplay); Michael Herr, Gustav Hasford (screenplay); Matthew Modine, Adam Baldwin, Vincent D'Onofrio, R. Lee Ermey, Dorian Harewood, Arliss Howard, Kevyn Major Howard, Ed O'Ross, Tim Colceri, John Terry, Bruce Boa, Stanley Kubrick, Vivian Kubrick	
J U L Y	10	Revenge of the Nerds II: Nerds in Paradise	20th Century Fox / Interscope Communications	Joe Roth (director); Steve Marshall, Dan Guntzelman (screenplay); Robert Carradine, Anthony Edwards, Curtis Armstrong, Larry B. Scott, Timothy Busfield, Andrew Cassese, Courtney Thorne-Smith, Bradley Whitford, Barry Sobel, James Cromwell, Ed Lauter, James Hong, Donald Gibb, Tom Hodges, Jack Gilpin, Michael Fitzgerald	
J U L Y	10	White Water Summer	Columbia Pictures	Jeff Bleckner (director); Ernest Kinoy (screenplay); Kevin Bacon, Sean Astin, Jonathan Ward, Matt Adler, K.C. Martel, Caroline McWilliams, Charles Siebert	
J U L Y	17	Jaws: The Revenge	Universal Pictures	Joseph Sargent (director); Michael de Guzman (screenplay); Lorraine Gary, Lance Guest, Mario Van Peebles, Karen Young, Michael Caine, Judith Barsi, Lynn Whitfield, Mitchell Anderson, Melvin Van Peebles, Fritzi Jane Courtney, Lee Fierro, Roy Scheider, Cedric Scott, Charles Bowleg, Mary Smith, Edna Billotto, Cyprian R. Dube, William E. Marks, Diane Hetfield, Jay Mello	
J U L Y	17	Nowhere to Hide	New Century Vista	Mario Azzopardi (director); George Goldsmith, Alex Reber (screenplay); Amy Madigan, Michael Ironside, John Colicos, Daniel Hugh Kelly, Robin MacEachern, Chuck Shamata, Clark Johnson, Maury Chaykin, Garrick Hagon, Timothy Webber, Philip Akin, Vlasta Vrána, Jayne Eastwood, Ross Hull, Géza Kovács, Andrew Johnston, Réal Andrews, Peter Blackwood, Shirley Merovitz, Philip Spensley, Amy Gartner	
J U L Y	17	Rita, Sue and Bob Too	Orion Classics	Alan Clarke (director); Andrea Dunbar (screenplay); Siobhan Finneran, Michelle Holmes, George Costigan, Lesley Sharp, Kulvinder Ghir, Danny O'Dea, Bernard Wrigley, Black Lace, Willie Ross, Patti Nichols, Maureen Long, David Britton, Mark Crampton, Stuart Googwin, Max Jackman, Andrew Krauz, Simon Waring, Joyce Pembroke, Jane Atkinson, Bryan Heeley, Paul Oldham, Dennis Conlon, Nancy Pute, Paul Hedges, Kailash Patel	
J U L Y	17	RoboCop	Orion Pictures	Paul Verhoeven (director); Edward Neumeier, Michael Miner (screenplay); Peter Weller, Nancy Allen, Daniel O'Herlihy, Ronny Cox, Kurtwood Smith, Miguel Ferrer, Robert DoQui, Ray Wise, Felton Perry, Paul McCrane, Jesse Goins, Lee de Broux, Edward Edwards, Michael Gregory, Neil Summers, Gene Wolande, Kevin Page, Tyress Allen, Darryl Cox, Jerry Haynes, Bill Schockley, Bill Farmer, David Packer, Leeza Gibbons, Mario Machado, Jon Davison, Wanda De Jesus, Allan Graf, Stephen Lee, Scott Thomson, Paul Verhoeven, Del Zamora, Calvin Jung, Rick Lieberman, Mark Carlton, Freddie Hice, Yolonda Williams, S.D. Nemeth	
J U L Y	17	Snow White and the Seven Dwarfs (re-release)	Walt Disney Pictures / Buena Vista Pictures Distribution	David Hand (director); Ted Sears, Earl Hurd, Merrill De Maris, Richard Creedon, Otto Englander, Dick Rickard, Dorothy Ann Blank, Webb Smith (screenplay); Adriana Caselotti, Lucille La Verne, Harry Stockwell, Roy Atwell, Pinto Colvig, Otis Harlan, Scotty Mattraw, Billy Gilbert, Eddie Collins, Moroni Olsen, Stuart Buchanan	
J U L Y	24	La Bamba	Columbia Pictures	Luis Valdez (director/screenplay); Lou Diamond Phillips, Esai Morales, Rosanna DeSoto, Elizabeth Peña, Danielle von Zerneck, Joe Pantoliano, Rick Dees, Marshall Crenshaw, Howard Huntsberry, Brian Setzer, Daniel Valdez, Sam Anderson, Stephen Lee, Diane Rodriguez, Noble Willingham, Andy Griggs, Tony Genaro, Katie Valdez, Concepcion Reyes	
J U L Y	24	Summer School	Paramount Pictures	Carl Reiner (director); Jeff Franklin (screenplay); Mark Harmon, Kirstie Alley, Robin Thomas, Patrick Labyorteaux, Courtney Thorne-Smith, Dean Cameron, Gary Riley, Richard Steven Horvitz, Kelly Jo Minter, Shawnee Smith, Fabiana Udenio, Ken Olandt, Duane Davis, Tom Troupe, Frank McCarthy, Carl Reiner	
J U L Y	24	Superman IV: The Quest for Peace	Warner Bros. Pictures / Cannon Films / DC Comics	Sidney J. Furie (director); Lawrence Konner, Mark Rosenthal (screenplay); Christopher Reeve, Gene Hackman, Margot Kidder, Jackie Cooper, Marc McClure, Jon Cryer, Sam Wanamaker, Mark Pillow, Mariel Hemingway, Jim Broadbent, William Hootkins, Stanley Lebor, Don Fellows, Robert Beatty, Susannah York, Damian McLawhorn	
J U L Y	24	Wish You Were Here	Atlantic Releasing Corp	David Leland (director/screenplay); Emily Lloyd, Tom Bell, Jesse Birdsall, Clare Clifford, Barbara Durkin, Geoffrey Hutchings, Charlotte Barker, Chloë Leland, Pat Heywood, Geoffrey Durham, Neville Smith, Heathcote Williams, Val McLane, Susan Skipper, Lee Whitlock, Sheila Kelley, Charlotte Ball, Abigail Leland	
J U L Y	31	The Living Daylights	United Artists / Eon Productions	John Glen (director); Richard Maibaum, Michael G. Wilson (screenplay); Timothy Dalton, Maryam d'Abo, Joe Don Baker, Art Malik, Jeroen Krabbé, John Rhys-Davies, Andreas Wisniewski, Thomas Wheatley, Julie T. Wallace, Desmond Llewelyn, Robert Brown, Walter Gotell, Caroline Bliss, Geoffrey Keen, Virginia Hey, John Terry, Nadim Sawalha, John Bowe, Catherine Rabett, Dulice Liecier, Bill Weston, John Barry, Barbara Broccoli, Simon Crane, Alan Harris, Gertan Klauber, Derek Lyons, Robert Miranda, Kerry Shale, Michael G. Wilson	
J U L Y	31	The Lost Boys	Warner Bros. Pictures	Joel Schumacher (director); Jeffrey Boam, Janice Fischer, James Jeremias (screenplay); Corey Feldman, Jami Gertz, Corey Haim, Edward Herrmann, Barnard Hughes, Jason Patric, Kiefer Sutherland, Dianne Wiest, Jamison Newlander, Brooke McCarter, Billy Wirth, Alex Winter, Kelly Jo Minter, Chance Michael Corbitt, Alexander Bacon Chapman, Nori Morgan, Timmy Cappello, Jim Turner	
J U L Y	31	Maid to Order	New Century Vista	Amy Holden Jones (director/screenplay); Perry Howze, Randy Howze (screenplay); Ally Sheedy, Beverly D'Angelo, Michael Ontkean, Valerie Perrine, Dick Shawn, Tom Skerritt, Merry Clayton, Rain Phoenix, Theodore Wilson, Jason Beghe, Katey Sagal, Khandi Alexander, Henry Woolf, Begoña Plaza	
J U L Y	31	A Man in Love	Cinecom Pictures	Diane Kurys (director/screenplay); Israel Horovitz, Olivier Schatzky (screenplay); Peter Coyote, Greta Scacchi, Jamie Lee Curtis, Claudia Cardinale, Peter Riegert, Vincent Lindon, Jean Pigozzi, John Berry, Elia Katz, Constantin Alexandrov, Jean-Claude de Goros, Michele Melega, Jole Silvani	
J U L Y	31	The Spirit	ABC/Warner Bros. Television	Michael Schultz (director); Steven E. de Souza (screenplay); Sam J. Jones, Nana Visitor, Bumper Robinson, Garry Walberg, Laura M. Robinson, Philip Baker Hall	
A U G U S T	5	Stakeout	Touchstone Pictures / Silver Screen Partners	John Badham (director); Jim Kouf (screenplay); Richard Dreyfuss, Emilio Estevez, Aidan Quinn, Madeleine Stowe, Forest Whitaker, Dan Lauria, Earl Billings, Ian Tracey, Jackson Davies, Don S. Davis, J.J. Makaro, Scott Andersen, Tony Pantages, Beatrice Boepple, Kyle Wodia, Jan Speck, Kim Kondrashoff, Gary Heatherington, Blu Mankuma, Denny Williams	
A U G U S T	7	Back to the Beach	Paramount Pictures	Lyndall Hobbs (director); Peter Krikes, Steve Meerson, Chris Thompson (screenplay); Frankie Avalon, Annette Funicello, Lori Loughlin, Tommy Hinkley, Connie Stevens, David Bowe, Rodney Bingenheimer, Dick Dale, Stevie Ray Vaughan, Fishbone, Rick Avery, Don Adams, Barbara Billingsley, Edd Byrnes, Bob Denver, Tony Dow, Alan Hale Jr., Jerry Mathers, Paul Reubens, O. J. Simpson, Demian Slade, Joe Holland, John Calvin, Laura Urstein, Linda Carol, Todd Bryant, Floyd Foster Jr.	
A U G U S T	7	The Care Bears Adventure in Wonderland	Cineplex Odeon Films / Nelvana	Raymond Jafelice (director); Peter Sauder, Susan Snooks, John de Klein (screenplay); Bob Dermer, Eva Almos, Dan Hennessey, Jim Henshaw, Marla Lukofsky, Luba Goy, Keith Knight, Tracey Moore, Colin Fox, John Stocker, Don McManus, Elizabeth Hanna, Alan Fawcett, Keith Hampshire, Alyson Court	
A U G U S T	7	Masters of the Universe	Cannon Films / Golan-Globus	Gary Goddard (director); David Odell (screenplay); Dolph Lundgren, Frank Langella, Courteney Cox, James Tolkan, Christina Pickles, Meg Foster, Barry Livingston, Chelsea Field, Jon Cypher, Billy Barty, Robert Duncan McNeill, Anthony De Longis, Tony Carroll, Pons Maar, Robert Towers, Peter Brooks	
A U G U S T	7	Nadine	Tri-Star Pictures	Robert Benton (director/screenplay); Jeff Bridges, Kim Basinger, Rip Torn, Gwen Verdon, Glenne Headly, Jerry Stiller	
A U G U S T	7	Who's That Girl	Warner Bros. Pictures	James Foley (director); Ken Finkleman, Andrew Smith (screenplay); Madonna, Griffin Dunne, Haviland Morris, John McMartin, Sir John Mills, Bibi Besch, Robert Swan, Drew Pillsbury, Coati Mundi, Dennis Burkley, James Dietz, Cecile Callan, Karen Baldwin, Kimberlin Brown, Crystal Carson, Elaine Wilkes, Sean Sullivan, Robert Cornthwaite, Albert Popwell, Alice Nunn, Gary Basaraba, Ron Taylor, Stanley Tucci, Mike Starr, Roy Brocksmith, Beatrice Colen, Robert Clotworthy, Andre Rosey Brown, Liz Sheridan, Glenn Plummer, Carmen Filpi, Ellen Crawford, Glen Chin	
A U G U S T	14	Can't Buy Me Love	Touchstone Pictures / Silver Screen Partners	Steve Rash (director); Michael Swerdlick (screenplay); Patrick Dempsey, Amanda Peterson, Tina Caspary, Darcy DeMoss, Cort McCown, Eric Bruskotter, Gerardo Mejia, Courtney Gains, Seth Green, Sharon Farrell, Dennis Dugan, Devin DeVasquez, Ami Dolenz, Max Perlich, Paula Abdul, Cloyce Morrow, Will Hannah, Lisa Givens	
A U G U S T	14	Disorderlies	Warner Bros. Pictures	Michael Schultz (director); Mark Feldberg, Mitchell Klebanoff (screenplay); Prince Markie Dee, Darren Robinson, Damon Wimbley, Ralph Bellamy, Anthony Geary, Tony Plana, Marco Rodríguez, Troy Beyer, Helen Reddy, Sam Chew Jr., Ray Parker Jr., Robert V. Barron, Jo Marie Payton, Don Hood, Rick Zumwalt, Rick Nielsen	
A U G U S T	14	Lionheart	Orion Pictures	Franklin J. Schaffner (director); Menno Meyjes, Richard Outten (screenplay); Eric Stoltz, Gabriel Byrne, Nicola Cowper, Dexter Fletcher, Deborah Moore, Nicholas Clay, Bruce Purchase, Neil Dickson, Penny Downie, Nadim Sawalha, John Franklyn-Robbins, Chris Pitt, Matthew Sim, Paul Rhys, Sammi Davis, Wayne Goddard, Courtney Roper-Knight, Michael Sundin, Louise Seacombe, Patrick Durkin, Haluk Bilginer, Ralph Michael, Barry Stanton, Jan Waters, Ann Firbank	
A U G U S T	14	The Monster Squad	Tri-Star Pictures	Fred Dekker (director/screenplay); Shane Black (screenplay); Andre Gower, Duncan Regehr, Stephen Macht, Stan Shaw, Tom Noonan, Jonathan Gries, Mary Ellen Trainor, Leonardo Cimino, Lisa Fuller, Tom Woodruff Jr., Jack Gwillim, Jason Hervey, David Proval, Daryl Anderson, Robby Kiger, Brent Chalem, Ryan Lambert, Michael Faustino, Ashley Bank, Carl Thibault, Michael Reid MacKay, Adam Carl, Mary Albee, Brynn Baron, Julie Merrill	
A U G U S T	14	No Way Out	Orion Pictures	Roger Donaldson (director); Robert Garland (screenplay); Kevin Costner, Gene Hackman, Sean Young, Will Patton, Howard Duff, George Dzundza, Jason Bernard, Iman, Fred Dalton Thompson, Leon Russom, Dennis Burkley, Marshall Bell, Chris D., Nicholas Worth, John D'Aquino, Michael Shillo, David Paymer, Robert Kerman, Eugene Robert Glazer, Darryl Henriques, John Hostetter, Jay Arlen Jones, June Chandler, Jon Cedar, Brad Pitt	
A U G U S T	14	North Shore	Universal Pictures	William Phelps (director/screenplay); Bill Finnegan, Tim McCanlies (screenplay); Matt Adler, Nia Peeples, John Philbin, Gerry Lopez, Gregory Harrison	
A U G U S T	21	Born in East L.A.	Universal Pictures	Cheech Marin (director/screenplay); Cheech Marin, Daniel Stern, Paul Rodriguez, Jan-Michael Vincent, Kamala Lopez, Tony Plana, Lupe Ontiveros, Alma Martinez, Neith Hunter, Tito Larriva, Eddie Barth, Larry Blackmon, Terrence Evans	
A U G U S T	21	Dirty Dancing	Vestron Pictures	Emile Ardolino (director); Eleanor Bergstein (screenplay); Patrick Swayze, Jennifer Grey, Jerry Orbach, Cynthia Rhodes, Jack Weston, Miranda Garrison, Kelly Bishop, Jane Brucker, Lonny Price, Max Cantor, Charles "Honi" Coles, Neal Jones, 'Cousin Brucie' Morrow, Wayne Knight, Paula Trueman, Garry Goodrow, Emile Ardolino	
A U G U S T	21	The Garbage Pail Kids Movie	Atlantic Releasing Corporation / Topps	Rod Amateau (director/screenplay); Melinda Palmer (screenplay); Anthony Newley, Mackenzie Astin, Katie Barberi, Jim Cummings, Phil Fondacaro, Debbie Lee Carrington, Ron McLachlan, J.P. Amateau, Marjory Graue, Kevin Thompson, Robert Bell, Chloe Amateau, Larry Green, Arturo Gil, Sue Rossitto, Teri Benaron	
A U G U S T	28	Apocalypse Now (re-release)	United Artists / Omni Zoetrope	Francis Ford Coppola (director/screenplay); John Milius (screenplay); Marlon Brando, Robert Duvall, Martin Sheen, Frederic Forrest, Albert Hall, Sam Bottoms, Larry Fishburne, Dennis Hopper, G. D. Spradlin, Jerry Ziesmer, Harrison Ford, Scott Glenn, Colleen Camp, Cynthia Wood, Linda Beatty, Bill Graham, Francis Ford Coppola, Vittorio Storaro, R. Lee Ermey, Michael Herr	
A U G U S T	28	The Fourth Protocol	Lorimar Motion Pictures	John Mackenzie (director); George Axelrod, Richard Burridge (screenplay); Michael Caine, Pierce Brosnan, Ned Beatty, Ian Richardson, Joanna Cassidy, Julian Glover, Michael Gough, Ray McAnally, Anton Rodgers, Matt Frewer, Caroline Blakiston, Joseph Brady, Betsy Brantley, Sean Chapman, Alan North, Ronald Pickup, John Horsley, Michael Bilton, Peter Cartwright, Aaron Swartz, Mark Rolston, Michael J. Jackson, Matthew Marsh, Jerry Harte	
A U G U S T	28	Hamburger Hill	Paramount Pictures / RKO Pictures	John Irvin (director); James Carabatsos (screenplay); Anthony Barrile, Michael Patrick Boatman, Don Cheadle, Michael Dolan, Dylan McDermott, Courtney B. Vance, Steven Weber, Tim Quill, Tommy Swerdlow, Don James, M.A. Nickles, Harry O'Reilly, Daniel O'Shea, Tegan West	
A U G U S T	28	House II: The Second Story	New World Pictures	Ethan Wiley (director/screenplay); Arye Gross, Jonathan Stark, Royal Dano, Lar Park Lincoln, Bill Maher, John Ratzenberger, Amy Yasbeck, Dwier Brown, Gregory Walcott, Jayne Modean, Lenora May, Devin DeVasquez, Kane Hodder, Frank Welker	
A U G U S T	28	Matewan	Cinecom Pictures	John Sayles (director/screenplay); Chris Cooper, James Earl Jones, Mary McDonnell, Will Oldham, David Strathairn, Ken Jenkins, Gordon Clapp, Kevin Tighe, John Sayles, Bob Gunton, Josh Mostel, Jace Alexander, Joe Grifasi, Maggie Renzi, Nancy Mette, Jo Henderson, Gary McCleery	
A U G U S T	28	The Rosary Murders	New Line Cinema / The Samuel Goldwyn Company	Fred Walton (director/screenplay); Elmore Leonard (screenplay); Donald Sutherland, Charles Durning, Josef Sommer, Belinda Bauer, Addison Powell, Anita Barone, Tom Mardirosian, Mark Margolis, Rex Everhart, Lupe Ontiveros, Stefan Gierasch, Peter Van Norden, James Murtaugh, Jihmi Kennedy, Anna Minot, Cordis Heard	
S E P T E M B E R	11	The Curse	Trans World Entertainment	David Keith (director); David Chaskin (screenplay); Wil Wheaton, Claude Akins, Malcolm Danare, Cooper Huckabee, John Schneider, Amy Wheaton, Steve Carlisle, Kathleen Jordon Gregory, Hope North, Steve Davis	
S E P T E M B E R	11	A Return to Salem's Lot	Warner Bros. Pictures / Larco Productions	Larry Cohen (director/screenplay); James Dixon (screenplay); Michael Moriarty, Samuel Fuller, Andrew Duggan, Ricky Addison Reed, June Havoc, Evelyn Keyes, Ronee Blakley, Tara Reid, Jill Gatsby, James Dixon, David Holbrook, Katja Crosby, Brad Rijn, Janelle Webb, Robert Burr	
S E P T E M B E R	16	In the Mood	King's Road Entertainment / Lorimar Motion Pictures	Phil Alden Robinson (director/screenplay); Patrick Dempsey, Talia Balsam, Beverly D'Angelo, Michael Constantine, Betty Jinnette, Kathleen Freeman, Peter Hobbs, Tony Longo, Ernie Lively, Kim Myers	
S E P T E M B E R	18	Amazon Women on the Moon	Universal Pictures	Joe Dante, Carl Gottlieb, Peter Horton, John Landis, Robert K. Weiss (directors); Michael Barrie, Jim Muholland (screenplay); Steve Allen, Rosanna Arquette, Paul Bartel, Ed Begley Jr., Ralph Bellamy, Sybil Danning, Griffin Dunne, Carrie Fisher, Steve Forrest, Monique Gabrielle, Steve Guttenberg, Arsenio Hall, Howard Hesseman, Lou Jacobi, B.B. King, Russ Meyer, Kelly Preston, Henny Youngman, Phil Hartman, Michelle Pfeiffer, Peter Horton, Joe Pantoliano, David Alan Grier, T.K. Carter, Robert Picardo, Dick Miller, Belinda Balaski, Marc McClure, Bryan Cranston, Andrew Dice Clay, Erica Yohn, Corey Burton, Robert Colbert, Joey Travolta, Forrest J. Ackerman, Lana Clarkson, William Bryant, Roxie Roker, Le Tari, Henry Silva, Roger Barkley, Al Lohman, Archie Hahn, Phil Proctor, Ira Newborn, Karen Montgomery, Rip Taylor, Slappy White, Jackie Vernon, Charlie Callas, William Marshall, Tino Insana, Donald Gibb, Frank Collison, Raye Birk, Larry Hankin, Garry Goodrow, Phil Bruns, John Ingle, Angel Tompkins, Terry McGovern, Matt Adler, Steve Cropper, Corrine Wahl, Willard E. Pugh, Herb Vigran, Mike Mazurki, Frank Beddor	
S E P T E M B E R	18	Fatal Attraction	Paramount Pictures	Adrian Lyne (director); James Dearden (screenplay); Michael Douglas, Glenn Close, Anne Archer, Ellen Hamilton Latzen, Stuart Pankin, Ellen Foley, Fred Gwynne, Meg Mundy, Tom Brennan, Lois Smith, Mike Nussbaum, J.J. Johnston, Michael Arkin, Jane Krakowski, James Eckhouse, Anna Levine, Larry Moss, Jan Rabson, Marilyn Schreffler	
S E P T E M B E R	18	Hellraiser	New World Pictures / Entertainment Film Distributors	Clive Barker (director/screenplay); Andrew Robinson, Clare Higgins, Ashley Laurence, Sean Chapman, Doug Bradley, Nicholas Vince, Simon Bamford, Grace Kirby, Oliver Smith, Robert Hines, Kenneth Nelson, Niall Buggy	
S E P T E M B E R	18	Maurice	Cinecom Pictures / Merchant Ivory Productions	James Ivory (director/screenplay); Kit Hesketh-Harvey (screenplay); James Wilby, Hugh Grant, Rupert Graves, Denholm Elliott, Simon Callow, Billie Whitelaw, Barry Foster, Judy Parfitt, Phoebe Nicholls, Ben Kingsley, Patrick Godfrey, Mark Tandy, Kitty Aldridge, Helena Michell, Catherine Rabett, Peter Eyre, Julian Wadham, Orlando Wells, Richard Warner, Helena Bonham Carter	
S E P T E M B E R	18	Orphans	Lorimar Motion Pictures	Alan J. Pakula (director); Lyle Kessler (screenplay); Albert Finney, Matthew Modine, Kevin Anderson, John Kellogg, Anthony Heald, Novella Nelson, Elizabeth Parrish, B. Constance Barry	
S E P T E M B E R	18	The Pick-up Artist	20th Century Fox	James Toback (director/screenplay); Molly Ringwald, Robert Downey Jr., Dennis Hopper, Danny Aiello, Harvey Keitel, Bob Gunton, Mildred Dunnock, Vanessa Williams, Polly Draper, Frederick Koehler, Robert Towne, Victoria Jackson, Lorraine Bracco, Fred Melamed, Christine Baranski, Brian Hamill, Tamara Bruno	
S E P T E M B E R	18	The Principal	Tri-Star Pictures	Christopher Cain (director); Frank Deese (screenplay); Jim Belushi, Louis Gossett Jr., Rae Dawn Chong, Kelly Jo Minter, Michael Wright, Jeffrey Jay Cohen, Esai Morales, Troy Winbush, Jacob Vargas, Reggie Johnson	
S E P T E M B E R	20	Mandela	HBO Pictures / Polymuse Productions / Titus Productions	Philip Saville (director); Ronald Harwood (screenplay); Danny Glover, Alfre Woodard, John Matshikiza, John Indi, Xoliswa Sithole, Juanita Waterman, Saul Reichlin, Gertrude Rook, Nathan Dambuza Mdledle, Mike Phillips	
S E P T E M B E R	25	Best Seller	Orion Pictures / Hemdale Film Corporation	John Flynn (director); Larry Cohen (screenplay); James Woods, Brian Dennehy, Victoria Tennant, Allison Balson, Paul Shenar, George Coe, Anne Pitoniak, Mary Carver, Sully Boyar, Kathleen Lloyd, Harold Tyner, Jay Ingram, William Bronder, Jeffrey Josephson, Edward Blackoff, J.P. Bumstead, Daniel Trent	
S E P T E M B E R	25	The Big Town	Columbia Pictures	Harold Becker, Ben Bolt (directors); Clark Howard, Robert Roy Pool (screenplay); Matt Dillon, Diane Lane, Tommy Lee Jones, Bruce Dern, Tom Skerritt, Lee Grant, Suzy Amis, David Marshall Grant, Don Francks, Del Close, Cherry Jones, David James Elliott, Chris Owens, Sean McCann, Marc Strange, Don Lake, Gary Farmer, Diego Matamoros, Sarah Polley, Lolita Davidovich	
S E P T E M B E R	25	Real Men	United Artists	Dennis Feldman (director/screenplay); Jim Belushi, John Ritter, Barbara Barrie, Bill Morey, Isa Jank, Mark Herrier	

== October–December ==
Opening		Title	Production company	Cast and crew	Ref.
O C T O B E R	2	Anna	Vestron Pictures	Yurek Bogayevicz (director/screenplay); Agnieszka Holland (screenplay); Sally Kirkland, Robert Fields, Paulina Porizkova, Steven Gilborn, Larry Pine, Sofia Coppola, Deirdre O'Connell, David R. Ellis	
O C T O B E R	2	Big Shots	20th Century Fox / Lorimar Film Entertainment	Robert Mandel (director); Joe Eszterhas (screenplay); Ricky Busker, Darius McCrary, Robert Joy, Robert Prosky, Jerzy Skolimowski, Paul Winfield, Brynn Thayer, Bill Hudson, Joe Seneca, Beah Richards, Ellen Geer, Jim Antonio, Andrea Bebel, Hutton Cobb, Mitch Beasley	
O C T O B E R	2	Like Father Like Son	Tri-Star Pictures / Imagine Entertainment	Rod Daniel (director); David Hoselton, Steve Bloom, Lorne Cameron (screenplay); Dudley Moore, Kirk Cameron, Margaret Colin, Catherine Hicks, Patrick O'Neal, Sean Astin, Larry Sellers, Maxine Stuart, David Wohl, Michael Horton, Bonnie Bedelia, Camille Cooper, Micah Grant, Bill Morrison	
O C T O B E R	2	Near Dark	De Laurentiis Entertainment Group / F/M Entertainment	Kathryn Bigelow (director/screenplay); Eric Red (screenplay); Adrian Pasdar, Jenny Wright, Lance Henriksen, Bill Paxton, Jenette Goldstein, Tim Thomerson, Joshua John Miller, Marcie Leeds, Troy Evans, Roger Aaron Brown, James LeGros, Billy Beck, S.A. Griffin, Neith Hunter, Theresa Randle	
O C T O B E R	2	Slam Dance	Island Pictures	Wayne Wang (director); Don Keith Opper (screenplay); Tom Hulce, Mary Elizabeth Mastrantonio, Virginia Madsen, Harry Dean Stanton, Millie Perkins, Don Keith Opper, Adam Ant, John Doe, Judith Barsi, Lisa Niemi, Herta Ware	
O C T O B E R	2	Zombie High	Cinema Group	Ron Link (director); Tim Doyle, Aziz Ghazal, Elizabeth Passerelli (screenplay); Virginia Madsen, Richard Cox, James Wilder, Sherilyn Fenn, Paul Feig, Kay E. Kuter	
O C T O B E R	9	Dancers	Cannon Film Distributors / The Cannon Group	Herbert Ross (director); Sarah Kernochan (screenplay); Mikhail Baryshnikov, Alessandra Ferri, Leslie Browne, Thomas Rall, Lynn Seymour, Victor Barbee, Mariangela Melato, Julie Kent, Gianmarco Tognazzi	
O C T O B E R	9	Chuck Berry: Hail! Hail! Rock 'n' Roll	Universal Pictures	Taylor Hackford (director); Chuck Berry, Keith Richards, Johnnie Johnson, Roy Orbison, Joey Spampinato, Chuck Leavell, Bobby Keys, Steve Jordan, Eric Clapton, Robert Cray, Linda Ronstadt, Etta James, Julian Lennon, Joe Walsh, Ingrid Berry, Bo Diddley, Ahmet Ertegun, The Everly Brothers, John Lennon, Jerry Lee Lewis, Little Richard, Robbie Robertson, Bruce Springsteen	
O C T O B E R	9	The Princess Bride	20th Century Fox / Act III Communications	Rob Reiner (director); William Goldman (screenplay); Cary Elwes, Robin Wright, Mandy Patinkin, Chris Sarandon, Christopher Guest, Wallace Shawn, André the Giant, Billy Crystal, Carol Kane, Peter Falk, Fred Savage	
O C T O B E R	9	Someone to Watch Over Me	Columbia Pictures	Ridley Scott (director); Howard Franklin (screenplay); Tom Berenger, Mimi Rogers, Lorraine Bracco, Jerry Orbach, John Rubinstein, Andreas Katsulas, James Moriarty, Tony Di Benedetto, Mark Moses, Daniel Hugh Kelly, Harley Cross, Joanne Baron, Jack McGee, Meg Mundy, Harvey Vernon, John Corbett	
O C T O B E R	9	Surrender	Warner Bros. Pictures / Cannon Films	Jerry Belson (director/screenplay); Sally Field, Michael Caine, Steve Guttenberg, Peter Boyle, Jackie Cooper, Julie Kavner, Louise Lasser, Iman, Frank Dicopoulos, Charles Noland, Paddi Edwards, Bill McIntyre, Bruce French, Christian Clemenson	
O C T O B E R	9	Three O'Clock High	Universal Pictures	Phil Joanou (director); Richard Christian Matheson, Thomas Szollosi (screenplay); Casey Siemaszko, Anne Ryan, Richard Tyson, Jeffrey Tambor, Philip Baker Hall, John P. Ryan, Stacey Glick, Mitch Pileggi, Theron Read, Liza Morrow, Caitlin O'Heaney, Alice Nunn, Paul Feig, Yeardley Smith, Jonathan Wise, Guy Massey, Mike Jolly, Charles Macaulay	
O C T O B E R	14	House of Games	Orion Pictures	David Mamet (director/screenplay); Lindsay Crouse, Joe Mantegna, Steven Goldstein, Jack Wallace, Ricky Jay, Mike Nussbaum, J. T. Walsh, Lilia Skala, W.H. Macy, Meshach Taylor, Olan Soule	
O C T O B E R	16	Barfly	Cannon Films / American Zoetrope	Barbet Schroeder (director); Charles Bukowski (screenplay); Mickey Rourke, Faye Dunaway, Alice Krige, J.C. Quinn, Frank Stallone, Sandy Martin, Gloria LeRoy, Pruitt Taylor Vince, Jack Nance, Roberta Bassin, Joe Unger, Harry Cohn, Fritz Feld, Charles Bukowski, Albert Henderson	
O C T O B E R	16	Hello Mary Lou: Prom Night II	Samuel Goldwyn Films / Alliance Atlantis	Bruce Pittman (director); Ron Oliver (screenplay); Michael Ironside, Wendy Lyon, Justin Louis, Lisa Schrage, Richard Monette, Terri Hawkes, Wendell Smith, John Pyper-Ferguson, Vincent Gale, Judy Mahbey, Beverley Hendry, Brock Simpson, Beth Gondek, Michael Evans, Dennis Robinson, Larry Musser, Glen Gretzky, David Robertson, Lorretta Bailey	
O C T O B E R	16	Hope and Glory	Columbia Pictures / Goldcrest Films / Nelson Entertainment	John Boorman (director/screenplay); Sebastian Rice-Edwards, Sarah Miles, David Hayman, Derrick O'Connor, Susan Wooldridge, Sammi Davis, Ian Bannen, Geraldine Muir, Anne Leon, Jean-Marc Barr	
O C T O B E R	16	Slumber Party Massacre II	New Concorde	Deborah Brock (director/screenplay); Crystal Bernard, Kimberly McArthur, Heidi Kozak, Jennifer Rhodes, Michael Delano, Juliette Cummins, Patrick Lowe, Joel Hoffman, Scott Westmoreland, Cindy Eilbacher, Hamilton Mitchell, Atanas Ilitch	
O C T O B E R	16	Weeds	De Laurentiis Entertainment Group	John D. Hancock (director/screenplay); Dorothy Tristan (screenplay); Nick Nolte, Ernie Hudson, Rita Taggart, Mark Rolston, Lane Smith, Joe Mantegna, William Forsythe, John Toles-Bey	
O C T O B E R	16	The Whales of August	Metro-Goldwyn-Mayer	Lindsay Anderson (director); David Berry (screenplay); Bette Davis, Lillian Gish, Vincent Price, Ann Sothern, Harry Carey Jr., Frank Grimes, Margaret Ladd, Tisha Sterling, Mary Steenburgen	
O C T O B E R	18	Scooby-Doo Meets the Boo Brothers	Worldvision Enterprises / Hanna-Barbera Productions	Paul Sommer, Carl Urbano, Ray Patterson (directors); Jim Ryan (screenplay); Don Messick, Casey Kasem, Sorrell Booke, Rob Paulsen, Ronnie Schell, Jerry Houser, Arte Johnson, Victoria Carroll, William Callaway, Michael Rye, Hamilton Camp, June Foray	
O C T O B E R	23	The Glass Menagerie	Cineplex Odeon Films	Paul Newman (director); Tennessee Williams (screenplay); Joanne Woodward, John Malkovich, Karen Allen, James Naughton	
O C T O B E R	23	The Killing Time	New World Pictures	Rick King (director); Don Bohlinger, James Nathan, Bruce Franklin Singer (screenplay); Beau Bridges, Kiefer Sutherland, Wayne Rogers, Joe Don Baker, Camelia Kath, Janet Carroll, Michael Madsen, Harvey Vernon, Shiri Appleby, Jeb Ellis-Brown, Harriet Medin	
O C T O B E R	23	No Man's Land	Orion Pictures	Peter Werner (director); Dick Wolf (screenplay); Charlie Sheen, D. B. Sweeney, Randy Quaid, Lara Harris, Bill Duke, R. D. Call, M. Emmet Walsh, Bernie Pock, Clare Wren, George Dzundza, Peggy McCay, Linda Shayne, Guy Boyd, Gary Riley, Jenny Gago, Michael Riley, Brad Pitt, Arlen Dean Snyder, Al Shannon, Kenny Endoso, James F. Kelly, Lori Butler, Danitza Kingsley, Robert Pierce, Claude Earl Jones, Jan Burrell, Channing Chase, Jessica Puscas, Molly Carter, Henry G. Sanders, Scott Lincoln, Tom Santo, Denis Hartigan	
O C T O B E R	23	Prince of Darkness	Universal Pictures / Alive Films / Carolco Pictures	John Carpenter (director/screenplay); Donald Pleasence, Lisa Blount, Victor Wong, Jameson Parker, Dennis Dun, Susan Blanchard, Anne Howard, Dirk Blocker, Jessie Lawrence Ferguson, Peter Jason, Thom Bray, Alice Cooper, Ann Yen, Ken Wright, Robert Grasmere	
O C T O B E R	23	The Sicilian	20th Century Fox / Gladden Entertainment	Michael Cimino (director); Steve Shagan, Gore Vidal (screenplay); Christopher Lambert, Terence Stamp, Joss Ackland, John Turturro, Barbara Sukowa, Richard Bauer, Giulia Boschi, Ray McAnally, Barry Miller, Andreas Katsulas, Michael Wincott, Ramon Bieri, Oliver Cotton, Joe Regalbuto, Aldo Ray, Derrick Branche	
O C T O B E R	23	Suspect	Tri-Star Pictures	Peter Yates (director); Eric Roth (screenplay); Cher, Dennis Quaid, Liam Neeson, John Mahoney, Joe Mantegna, Philip Bosco, Fred Melamed, Bernie McInerney, Bill Cobbs, Richard Gant, Jim Walton, Michael Beach, Ralph Cosham, Djanet Sears	
O C T O B E R	30	Baby Boom	United Artists	Charles Shyer (director/screenplay); Nancy Meyers (screenplay); Diane Keaton, Sam Shepard, Harold Ramis, Sam Wanamaker, James Spader, Pat Hingle, Britt Leach, Annie Golden, Kristina and Michelle Kennedy, Mary Gross, Elizabeth Bennett, Peter Elbling, Shera Danese, Beverly Todd, William Frankfather, George O. Petrie, Victoria Jackson, Dori Brenner, Jane Elliot, Benjamin Diskin, Paxton Whitehead, Hansford Rowe, Billy Beck, Katherine Borowitz, Robin Bartlett, Christopher Noth, Linda Ellerbee, Margaret Whitton	
O C T O B E R	30	Fatal Beauty	Metro-Goldwyn-Mayer	Tom Holland (director); Hilary Henkin, Dean Riesner (screenplay); Whoopi Goldberg, Sam Elliott, Rubén Blades, Harris Yulin, John P. Ryan, Jennifer Warren, Brad Dourif, Charles Hallahan, M. C. Gainey, James LeGros, Celeste Yarnall, James Smith, Mark Pellegrino, Neill Barry, Clayton Landey, Ebbe Roe Smith, Larry Hankin, Cheech Marin, David Harris, Michael Delorenzo, Michael Champion, Mike Jolly, Walter Robles, Cathianne Blore, Steve Akahoshi, Bernie Hern, Fred Asparagus, Gary Carlos Cervantes, Emilia Avarza, Rick Telles, Prince Hughes	
O C T O B E R	30	The Hidden	New Line Cinema	Jack Sholder (director); Jim Kouf (screenplay); Kyle MacLachlan, Michael Nouri, Clu Gulager, Chris Mulkey, Ed O'Ross, Clarence Felder, Claudia Christian, Larry Cedar, Richard Brooks, William Boyett, Tony Anholt, Steve Eastin, Katherine Cannon, James Luisi, Danny Trejo, Lin Shaye	
O C T O B E R	31	The Man Who Broke 1,000 Chains	HBO Pictures	Daniel Mann (director); Michael Campus (screenplay); Val Kilmer, Charles Durning, Sónia Braga, Kyra Sedgwick, James Keach, Elisha Cook Jr., Clancy Brown, William Sanderson, Paul Benjamin, Bill Bolender, John Mitchum, Chris Mulkey, Taj Mahal, Taylor Presnell, Esther Benson, Burt Conway, Julius Tennon	
N O V E M B E R	6	Cry Freedom	Universal Pictures	Richard Attenborough (director); John Briley (screenplay); Denzel Washington, Kevin Kline, Penelope Wilton, Alec McCowen, Kevin McNally, Ian Richardson, John Thaw, Timothy West, Josette Simon, John Hargreaves, Miles Anderson, Zakes Mokae, John Matshikiza, Kate Hardie, Julian Glover, Philip Bretherton, Michael Turner, Paul Jerricho, Louis Mahoney, W. Morgan Sheppard, Tony Vogel, Gerald Sim, Peter Cartwright, Gary Whelan, Badi Uzzaman, Robert Phillips, Joseph Marcell, James Aubrey, Judy Cornwell, Gwen Watford, Michael Graham Cox, Garrick Hagon, Nick Tate, William Marlowe	
N O V E M B E R	6	Dark Eyes	Island Pictures	Nikita Mikhalkov (director/screenplay); Alexander Adabashyan, Suso Cecchi d'Amico (screenplay); Marcello Mastroianni, Marthe Keller, Yelena Safonova, Pina Cei, Vsevolod Larionov, Innokenti Smoktunovsky, Silvana Mangano, Roberto Herlitzka, Oleg Tabakov, Alexander Adabashyan, Isabella Rossellini	
N O V E M B E R	6	Death Wish 4: The Crackdown	Cannon Films	J. Lee Thompson (director); Gail Morgan Hickman (screenplay); Charles Bronson, Kay Lenz, John P. Ryan, Perry Lopez, Soon-Tek Oh, George Dickerson, Dana Barron, Danny Trejo, Dan Ferro, Michael Russo, James Purcell, Tom Everett, Hector Mercado, Tim Russ, Mark Pellegrino, Mitch Pileggi, Irwin Keyes, Richard Aherne, Mike Moroff, Gerald Castillo, Jesse Dabson, Daniel Sabia, Peter Sherayko, David Fontano	
N O V E M B E R	6	Hello Again	Touchstone Pictures / Silver Screen Partners	Frank Perry (director); Susan Isaacs (screenplay); Shelley Long, Judith Ivey, Gabriel Byrne, Corbin Bernsen, Sela Ward, Austin Pendleton, Carrie Nye, Robert Lewis, Madeleine Potter, Thor Fields, Tony Sirico, Kaiulani Lee, John Rothman, Kate McGregor-Stewart, Lynne Thigpen, Chip Zien, Everett Quinton, Patricia Gage, Colin Fox, Illeana Douglas	
N O V E M B E R	6	Hiding Out	De Laurentiis Entertainment Group	Bob Giraldi (director); Joe Menosky, Jeff Rothberg (screenplay); Jon Cryer, Keith Coogan, Annabeth Gish, Claude Brooks, Oliver Cotton, Tim Quill, Tony Soper, Ned Eisenberg, Marita Geraghty, John Spencer, Gretchen Cryer, Anne Pitoniak, Beth Ehlers, Richard Portnow, Gerry Bamman, Jack Gilpin, Joy Behar, Lou Walker	
N O V E M B E R	6	Less than Zero	20th Century Fox / Avnet/Kerner Productions	Marek Kanievska (director); Harley Peyton (screenplay); Andrew McCarthy, Jami Gertz, Robert Downey Jr., James Spader, Nicholas Pryor, Tony Bill, Donna Mitchell, Michael Bowen, Sarah Buxton, Jayne Modean, Lisanne Falk, Neith Hunter, Michael Greene, Anthony Kiedis, Flea, Brad Pitt, Christopher Maleki, Jackie Swanson	
N O V E M B E R	6	Made in Heaven	Lorimar Film Entertainment	Alan Rudolph (director); Bruce A. Evans, Raynold Gideon (screenplay); Timothy Hutton, Kelly McGillis, Maureen Stapleton, Ann Wedgeworth, Mare Winningham, Don Murray, Amanda Plummer, James Gammon, Tim Daly, David Rasche, Willard E. Pugh, Marj Dusay, Tom Petty, Ellen Barkin, Debra Winger, Ric Ocasek, Neil Young	
N O V E M B E R	6	Russkies	New Century Vista	Rick Rosenthal (director); Sheldon Lettich, Michael Nankin, Alan Jay Glueckman (screenplay); Whip Hubley, Joaquin Phoenix, Peter Billingsley, Stefan DeSalle, Susan Walters, Patrick Kilpatrick	
N O V E M B E R	6	Steel Dawn	Vestron Pictures	Lance Hool (director); Doug Lefler (screenplay); Patrick Swayze, Lisa Niemi, Anthony Zerbe, Brion James, Christopher Neame, John Fujioka, Arnold Vosloo, Brett Hool, Marcel Van Heerden	
N O V E M B E R	11	Siesta	Lorimar Motion Pictures	Mary Lambert (director); Patricia Louisianna Knop (screenplay); Ellen Barkin, Gabriel Byrne, Julian Sands, Isabella Rossellini, Martin Sheen, Alexei Sayle, Grace Jones, Jodie Foster, Anastassia Stakis, Gary Cady	
N O V E M B E R	13	Cross My Heart	Universal Pictures	Armyan Bernstein (director/screenplay); Gail Parent (screenplay); Martin Short, Annette O'Toole, Paul Reiser, Joanna Kerns, Jessica Puscas, Lee Arenberg, Corinne Bohrer, Jason Stuart, Shelley Taylor Morgan, Eric Poppick, Steven J. Zmed	
N O V E M B E R	13	The Running Man	Tri-Star Pictures / Taft Entertainment / HBO Films	Paul Michael Glaser (director); Steven E. de Souza (screenplay); Arnold Schwarzenegger, María Conchita Alonso, Richard Dawson, Yaphet Kotto, Marvin J. McIntyre, Mick Fleetwood, Professor Toru Tanaka, Gus Rethwisch, Jesse Ventura, Jim Brown, Erland Van Lidth De Jeude, Dweezil Zappa, Kurt Fuller, Rodger Bumpass, Edward Bunker, Sven-Ole Thorsen, Karen Leigh Hopkins, Anthony Pena, Ken Lerner, Dey Young, Dona Hardy, Lynne Marie Stewart, George P. Wilbur, Thomas Rosales Jr., Franco Columbu, Lin Shaye, Boyd Kestner	
N O V E M B E R	15	The Jetsons Meet the Flintstones	Worldvision Enterprises / Hanna-Barbera Productions	Don Lusk, Ray Patterson (directors); Don Nelson, Arthur Alsberg (screenplay); George O'Hanlon, Henry Corden, Penny Singleton, Jean Vander Pyl, Don Messick, Mel Blanc, Julie McWhirter, Janet Waldo, Daws Butler, John Stephenson, Jon Bauman, Hamilton Camp, Frank Welker, Brenda Vaccaro, Patric Zimmerman, Howard Morris, Catherine Thompson	
N O V E M B E R	15	Laguna Heat	HBO Pictures	Simon Langton (director); D.M. Eyre, Pete Hamill, David Burton Morris (screenplay); Harry Hamlin, Jason Robards, Rip Torn, Catherine Hicks, Anne Francis, James Gammon, Jeff Kober, Dehl Berti, Clyde Kusatsu, Rutanya Alda, Tom Pedi, Peter Brocco, Peter Jason, Gary Pagett, Fred Ponzlov, Peggy Doyle, David Komatz	
N O V E M B E R	20	Cinderella (re-release)	Walt Disney Pictures / RKO Radio Pictures	Clyde Geronimi, Hamilton Luske, Wilfred Jackson (directors); Ken Anderson, Perce Pearce, Winston Hibler, Bill Peet, Ted Sears, Maurice Rapf, Homer Brightman, Erdman Penner, Harry Reeves, Joe Rinaldi (screenplay); Ilene Woods, Eleanor Audley, Verna Felton, Rhoda Williams, Lucille Bliss, William Phipps, Jimmy MacDonald, Luis van Rooten, Don Barclay, June Foray, Mike Douglas, Betty Lou Gerson	
N O V E M B E R	20	Date with an Angel	De Laurentiis Entertainment Group	Tom McLoughlin (director/screenplay); Michael E. Knight, Phoebe Cates, Emmanuelle Béart, David Dukes, Albert Macklin, Vinny Argiro, Bibi Besch, Cheryl Pollak, Phil Brock, Peter Kowanko, Steven Banks, Charles Lane, J. Don Ferguson	
N O V E M B E R	20	Flowers in the Attic	New World Pictures / Fries Entertainment	Jeffrey Bloom (director/screenplay); Victoria Tennant, Kristy Swanson, Jeb Stuart Adams, Louise Fletcher, Ben Ryan Ganger, Lindsay Parker, Marshall Colt, Nathan Davis, Leonard Mann, V.C. Andrews, Alex Koba, Bruce Neckels, Gus Peters, Brooke Fries, Clare C. Peck	
N O V E M B E R	20	The Last Emperor	Columbia Pictures / Hemdale Film Corporation / Recorded Picture Company	Bernardo Bertolucci (director/screenplay); Mark Peploe (screenplay); John Lone, Joan Chen, Peter O'Toole, Ying Ruocheng, Victor Wong, Dennis Dun, Ryuichi Sakamoto, Maggie Han, Ric Young, Wu Junmei, Cary-Hiroyuki Tagawa, Lisa Lu, Basil Pao, Henry O, Jade Go, Fumihiko Ikeda, Fan Guang, Hideo Takamatsu, Hajime Tachibana, Richard Vuu, Tijger Tsou, Wu Tao, Henry Kyi, Alvin Riley III	
N O V E M B E R	20	Nuts	Warner Bros. Pictures / Barwood Films	Martin Ritt (director); Tom Topor, Darryl Ponicsan, Alvin Sargent (screenplay); Barbra Streisand, Richard Dreyfuss, Maureen Stapleton, Eli Wallach, Robert Webber, James Whitmore, Karl Malden, Leslie Nielsen, William Prince, Dakin Matthews, Paul Benjamin, Warren Manzi, Elizabeth Hoffman, Castulo Guerra, Tyra Ferrell, Tina Lifford	
N O V E M B E R	20	Sign o' the Times	Cineplex Odeon Films	Prince (director/screenplay); Prince	
N O V E M B E R	20	Teen Wolf Too	Atlantic Releasing Corporation	Christopher Leitch (director); Tim Kring (screenplay); Jason Bateman, Kim Darby, John Astin, Paul Sand, James Hampton, Mark Holton, Stuart Fratkin, Kathleen Freeman, Estee Chandler, Robert Neary, Beth Ann Miller, Rachel Sharp, William H. Burton, David Burton	
N O V E M B E R	25	The Adventures of Ichabod and Mr. Toad (re-release)	Walt Disney Pictures / RKO Radio Pictures	Ben Sharpsteen, Jack Kinney, Clyde Geronimi, James Algar (directors); Erdman Penner, Winston Hibler, Joe Rinaldi, Ted Sears, Homer Brightman, Harry Reeves (screenplay); Eric Blore, Pat O'Malley, John Ployardt, Colin Campbell, Campbell Grant, Claude Allister, The Rhythmaires, Oliver Wallace, Alec Harford, Pinto Colvig, Leslie Denison, Edmond Stevens, James Bodrero, Billy Bletcher, Clarence Nash, Gloria Wood, Bing Crosby, Basil Rathbone	
N O V E M B E R	25	Housekeeping	Columbia Pictures	Bill Forsyth (director/screenplay); Christine Lahti, Sara Walker, Andrea Burchill, Anne Pitoniak, Barbara Reese, Margot Pinvidic, Bill Smillie, Wayne Robson, Betty Phillips, Karen Elizabeth Austin, Dolores Drake, Georgie Collins, Tonya Tanner, Leah Penny	
N O V E M B E R	25	Planes, Trains and Automobiles	Paramount Pictures / Hughes Entertainment	John Hughes (director/screenplay); Steve Martin, John Candy, Laila Robins, Dylan Baker, Olivia Burnette, Larry Hankin, Richard Herd, Matthew Lawrence, Michael McKean, Kevin Bacon, Carol Bruce, Diana Douglas, Martin Ferrero, Susan Kellermann, Edie McClurg, George Petrie, Gary Riley, Charles Tyner, Susan Isaacs, Bill Irwin, Ben Stein, Troy Evans, Ken Tipton, Lyman Ward, Tom Willett, Chino 'Fats' Williams, William Windom	
N O V E M B E R	25	Three Men and a Baby	Touchstone Pictures / Silver Screen Partners / Interscope Communications	Leonard Nimoy (director); James Orr, Jim Cruickshank (screenplay); Tom Selleck, Steve Guttenberg, Ted Danson, Margaret Colin, Celeste Holm, Nancy Travis, Michelle and Lisa Blair, Alexandra Amini, Philip Bosco, Paul Guilfoyle, Earl Hindman, Barbara Budd, Eugene Clark, Derek de Lint, Dave Foley, Jackie Richardson, Cynthia Harris, Colin Quinn, Mario Joyner	
D E C E M B E R	4	The Trouble with Spies	HBO Pictures / De Laurentiis Entertainment Group	Burt Kennedy (director/screenplay); Donald Sutherland, Ned Beatty, Ruth Gordon, Lucy Gutteridge, Michael Hordern, Suzanne Danielle, Robert Morley, Gregory Sierra, Luis Barboo, Jenny Tomasin, Frank Welker, Fima Noveck, James Willis	
D E C E M B E R	4	Walker	Universal Pictures	Alex Cox (director); Rudy Wurlitzer (screenplay); Ed Harris, Richard Masur, René Auberjonois, Peter Boyle, Miguel Sandoval, Marlee Matlin, Keith Szarabajka, Sy Richardson, Xander Berkeley, John Diehl, Alfonso Arau, Pedro Armendáriz Jr., Gerrit Graham, William O'Leary, Kathy Burke, Blanca Guerra, Rick Barker, Karl Braun, Richard Edson, Bennet Guillory, David Hayman, Dick Rude, Zander Schloss, Milton Selzer, Edward Tudor-Pole, Norbert Weisser, Biff Yeager, Richard Zobel, Joe Strummer, Del Zamora, Fox Harris	
D E C E M B E R	11	Cold Steel	CineTel Films	Dorothy Ann Puzo (director/screenplay); Lisa M. Hansen, Michael Sonye, Moe Quigley (screenplay); Brad Davis, Sharon Stone, Jonathan Banks, Jay Acavone, Adam Ant	
D E C E M B E R	11	Throw Momma from the Train	Orion Pictures	Danny DeVito (director); Stu Silver (screenplay); Danny DeVito, Billy Crystal, Anne Ramsey, Kim Greist, Kate Mulgrew, Branford Marsalis, Rob Reiner, Bruce Kirby, Annie Ross, Raye Birk, Olivia Brown, Philip Perlman, Stu Silver, Randall Miller, Andre Rosey Brown, Peter Brocco, Farley Granger, Robert Walker, Oprah Winfrey	
D E C E M B E R	11	Wall Street	20th Century Fox	Oliver Stone (director/screenplay); Stanley Weiser (screenplay); Michael Douglas, Charlie Sheen, Daryl Hannah, Martin Sheen, Hal Holbrook, Terence Stamp, James Karen, Sean Young, James Spader, Tamara Tunie, Franklin Cover, John C. McGinley, Frank Adonis, John Capodice, Josh Mostel, Ann Talman, Andrea Thompson, Lauren Tom, Michael O'Donoghue, Cecilia Peck, Paul Guilfoyle, Annie McEnroe, Grant Shaud, Saul Rubinek, Sean Stone, Adelle Lutz, Sylvia Miles, Richard Dysart, Millie Perkins, Oliver Stone	
D E C E M B E R	18	*batteries not included	Universal Pictures / Amblin Entertainment	Matthew Robbins (director/screenplay); Brad Bird, Brent Maddock, S. S. Wilson (screenplay); Hume Cronyn, Jessica Tandy, Frank McRae, Elizabeth Peña, Dennis Boutsikaris, Michael Carmine, John Pankow, Michael Greene, Tom Aldredge, Wendy Schaal	
D E C E M B E R	18	The Dead	Vestron Pictures	John Huston (director); Tony Huston (screenplay); Anjelica Huston, Donal McCann, Helena Carroll, Cathleen Delany, Dan O'Herlihy, Marie Kean, Donal Donnelly, Sean McClory, Frank Patterson, Colm Meaney, Kate O'Toole, Bairbre Dowling, Redmond Gleeson, Rachael Dowling, Ingrid Craigie, Lyda Anderson, Maria McDermottroe, Cormac O'Herlihy, Maria Hayden	
D E C E M B E R	18	Eddie Murphy Raw	Paramount Pictures	Robert Townsend (director); Eddie Murphy (screenplay); Eddie Murphy, Tatyana Ali, Deon Richmond, Billie Allen, Tiger Haynes, Leonard Jackson, Samuel L. Jackson, Basil Wallace, Damien Wayans, Ellis E. Williams, Carol Woods, Kim Wayans, Edye Byrde, Clebert Ford, Birdie M. Hale, Davenia McFadden, Gwen McGee, James Brown III, Michelle Davison, J. D. Hall, Barbara Iley, John Lafayette, Lex Monson, Warren Morris	
D E C E M B E R	18	Ironweed	Tri-Star Pictures / Taft Entertainment	Hector Babenco (director); William Kennedy (screenplay); Jack Nicholson, Meryl Streep, Carroll Baker, Michael O'Keefe, Fred Gwynne, Diane Venora, Margaret Whitton, Tom Waits, Nathan Lane, James Gammon, Laura Esterman, Joe Grifasi, Hy Anzell, Ted Levine, Black-Eyed Susan, Lola Pashalinski, Frank Whaley, Louis St. Louis, Matt McGrath, Boris McGiver	
D E C E M B E R	18	Leonard Part 6	Columbia Pictures	Paul Weiland (director); Jonathan Reynolds (screenplay); Bill Cosby, Tom Courtenay, Joe Don Baker, Moses Gunn, Gloria Foster, Victoria Rowell, Anna Levine, Grace Zabriskie, John Hostetter, William Hall, George Kirby, Obba Babatundé, Larry Gates, Leo Rossi, Jane Fonda, Pat Colbért, David Maier, Hal Bokar, George Maguire, Ann Armour, Reggie Waldon	
D E C E M B E R	18	Moonstruck	Metro-Goldwyn-Mayer	Norman Jewison (director); John Patrick Shanley (screenplay); Cher, Nicolas Cage, Vincent Gardenia, Olympia Dukakis, Danny Aiello, Julie Bovasso, Louis Guss, John Mahoney, Feodor Chaliapin Jr., Anita Gillette, Leonardo Cimino, Paula Trueman, Joe Grifasi, Robin Bartlett, Helen Hanft, Amy Aquino, Tony Azito, Lisa Howard, Cynthia Dale, Tommy Hollis, Catherine Scorsese, Charles Scorsese	
D E C E M B E R	18	Overboard	Metro-Goldwyn-Mayer	Garry Marshall (director); Leslie Dixon (screenplay); Goldie Hawn, Kurt Russell, Edward Herrmann, Katherine Helmond, Roddy McDowall, Michael G. Hagerty, Jared Rushton, Hector Elizondo, Sven-Ole Thorsen, Garry Marshall, Ray Combs, Frank Buxton, Wright Brothers Band, Brian Price, Jamie Wild, Jeffrey Wiseman, Henry Alan Miller, Doris Hess	
D E C E M B E R	18	September	Orion Pictures	Woody Allen (director/screenplay); Denholm Elliott, Mia Farrow, Elaine Stritch, Jack Warden, Sam Waterston, Dianne Wiest, Rosemary Murphy, Ira Wheeler, Jane Cecil	
D E C E M B E R	23	Good Morning, Vietnam	Touchstone Pictures	Barry Levinson (director); Mitch Markowitz (screenplay); Robin Williams, Forest Whitaker, Chintara Sukapatana, Bruno Kirby, Robert Wuhl, J. T. Walsh, Noble Willingham, Richard Edson, Richard Portnow, Floyd Vivino, Tung Thanh Tran, Juney Smith, Cu Ba Nguyen	
D E C E M B E R	23	The Lonely Passion of Judith Hearne	Island Pictures / HandMade Films	Jack Clayton (director); Peter Nelson (screenplay); Maggie Smith, Bob Hoskins, Wendy Hiller, Marie Kean, Ian McNeice, Alan Devlin, Prunella Scales, Sheila Reid, Aidan Gillen, Peter Gilmore, Áine Ní Mhuirí, Kate Binchy, Rudi Davies, Niall Buggy, Martina Stanley, Leonard McGuire, Catherine Cusack	
D E C E M B E R	25	Broadcast News	20th Century Fox / Gracie Films	James L. Brooks (director/screenplay); William Hurt, Albert Brooks, Holly Hunter, Robert Prosky, Lois Chiles, Joan Cusack, Peter Hackes, Christian Clemenson, Jack Nicholson, Leo Burmester, Marita Geraghty, Glen Roven, Marc Shaiman, Martha Smith, John Cusack, Gennie James	
D E C E M B E R	25	Empire of the Sun	Warner Bros. Pictures / Amblin Entertainment	Steven Spielberg (director); Tom Stoppard (screenplay); Christian Bale, John Malkovich, Miranda Richardson, Nigel Havers, Joe Pantoliano, Leslie Phillips, Masatō Ibu, Emily Richard, Rupert Frazer, Ben Stiller, Robert Stephens, Guts Ishimatsu, Burt Kwouk, Paul McGann, Marc de Jonge, J. G. Ballard, Peter Gale, Takatarô Kataoka	
D E C E M B E R	25	Pinocchio and the Emperor of the Night	New World Pictures / Filmation	Hal Sutherland (director); Robby London, Barry O'Brien, Dennis O'Flaherty (screenplay); Scott Grimes, Tom Bosley, Ed Asner, Frank Welker, Jonathan Harris, James Earl Jones, William Windom, Don Knotts, Rickie Lee Jones, Linda Gary, Lana Beeson	
D E C E M B E R	26	Into the Homeland	HBO Pictures	Lesli Linka Glatter (director); Anna Hamilton Phelan (screenplay); Powers Boothe, C. Thomas Howell, Cindy Pickett, Paul LeMat	

== See also ==
- List of 1987 box office number-one films in the United States
- 1987 in the United States
