= Carl Andrews =

Carl Andrews may refer to:

- Carl Andrews (politician)
- Carl Andrews (actor)
