= Anne Ryan =

Anne Ryan may refer to:

- Anne Ryan (artist)
- Anne Ryan (actress)
