= The Day the Loving Stopped =

- Genre: Drama
- Written by: Liz Coe
- Directed by: Daniel Mann
- Starring: Dennis Weaver; Valerie Harper; Dominique Dunne
- Theme music composer: Lee Holdridge
- Country of origin: United States
- Original language: English

Production
- Executive producers: Paul Monash; Jerome M. Zeitman
- Producer: Robert L. Jacks
- Cinematography: Robert B. Hauser
- Editors: Jack Gleason; Walter Hannemann
- Running time: 100 minutes
- Production company: Monash/Zeitman Productions

Original release
- Network: ABC
- Release: October 16, 1981

The Day the Loving Stopped is a 1981 American made-for-television drama film directed by Daniel Mann. Based on a novel by Julie Autumn List, the film stars Dennis Weaver and Valerie Harper as a couple whose divorce upsets their two daughters, portrayed by Dominique Dunne and Ally Sheedy.

== Plot ==
As Judy Danner is about to marry her college sweetheart Danny Reynolds, she starts to question if marrying the man she loves is the right decision, considering how her parents, psychologist, Aaron, and Norma, have divorced bitterly. The film is told mostly in flashbacks, as Judy, and her younger sister Debbie, reflect their parents' marriage. As children, Judy and Debbie were very happy, living with their parents under the same roof. Norma, however, is unhappy with her marriage. She constantly gets upset with Aaron and suspects that he might have an affair with one of his patients due to his recurring late night visits to them. Despite the children's protests, they decide to divorce each other.

Judy and Norma have difficulty adjusting to their new home situations, and try - without luck - to reunite their parents. Norma quickly begins to date an artist named Bryan Forma. Aaron falls in love with, and eventually marries Laura. During Aaron and Laura's wedding, Judy bursts out in tears and tells her dad that she wants him to get back together with Norma. Even after the divorce, Aaron and Norma are constantly fighting with each other, which assures Aaron that he will never have a future with his ex-wife. Judy and Debbie do not get along with Laura's daughter Cathy. Conflicts ensue when Aaron tells Judy that they cannot spend time together 24/7 and that he needs to be with Laura sometimes. Judy feels rejected and vows to never speak to her father again.

Years later, in college, Judy meets Danny. Though hesitant at first, she agrees to date with him and they both fall in love. As they are about to marry, Judy starts to worry that it might be a wrong decision, considering how everyone around her divorces at one point. Aaron has split with Laura, and Norma recently broke up with Bryan, because he moved to Rome. Norma and Debbie both try to comfort Judy, but eventually Aaron convinces her that she should not break off the wedding. In the end, Judy and Danny marry.

== Cast ==
- Dennis Weaver as Aaron Danner
- Valerie Harper as Norma Danner
- Dominique Dunne as Judy Danner
- Sam Groom as Bryan Forma
- James Canning as Danny Reynolds
- Ally Sheedy as Debbie Danner
- Francoise Noel as Young Judy Danner
- Stacey Glick as Young Debbie Danner
- Arlene Martel as Laura
- Debbie Hines as Cathy
