= Bachelors Walk (TV series) =

- Season 1 DVD cover
- Created by: Tom Hall, Kieran Carney & John Carney
- Starring: Keith McErlean, Don Wycherley, Simon Delaney
- Country of origin: Ireland
- Original language: English
- No. of seasons: 3
- No. of episodes: 21

Production
- Running time: 38–44 mins

Original release
- Network: Network 2 / RTÉ Two; BBC Choice
- Release: 1 October 2001 – 26 December 2006

Bachelors Walk is an Irish comedy-drama series shot in and around Dublin. The programme was first broadcast on Network 2 on 1 October 2001. The show had a run of three series and, after an absence for three years, a one-off Christmas special which aired on Saint Stephen's Day 2006 on RTÉ Two.

== Plot ==
The series revolves around Barry, who is looking for a get-rich-quick scheme; Raymond, a film critic; and Michael, a barrister, who live in a house in Bachelors Walk in Dublin. The series begins with the arrival of new tenant, Alison, an art gallery manager from County Donegal.

In the second series Michael marries Jane. In the third Raymond gets a teaching job in Mullingar. The finale features a will-they-won't-they story featuring Raymond and Alison.

== Cast ==
- Keith McErlean as Barry
- Don Wycherley as Raymond
- Simon Delaney as Michael
- Marcella Plunkett as Alison
- Kelly Campbell as Jane
- Donna Dent as Constance
- Nick Lee as James Lester
- Moya Farrelly as Sally
- Antony Conaty as Estate Agent
- Barbara Griffin as Jane
- Ailish Symons as Jennifer
- Vincent Walsh as Davor
- Des Nealon as Michael's Father
- Annie Ryan as Kate
- Fiona Glascott as Rachel
- Aidan Kelly as Dean Jordan
- Oliver Maguire as Russell

== Production ==
The first series was filmed during the summer of 2001 and most of the series was filmed on location in Dublin. The house where the series is set is on Lower Ormond Quay, west of the Millennium Bridge. The pub featured throughout the series is Mulligan's pub on Poolbeg Street. The second series was filmed during the summer of 2002, and the third and final series in the summer of 2003, each season airing in the autumn of that year respectively.

== Episodes ==
=== Season 1 (2001) ===
| No. overall | No. in season | Title | Original release date |
|---|---|---|---|
| 1 | 1 | "Episode 1" | 1 October 2001 |
Three thirtysomething commitment-phobes live together on Bachelors Walk. Raymond is excited as an ex-girlfriend returns to Dublin.
| 2 | 2 | "Episode 2" | 8 October 2001 |
Michael celebrates his 30th birthday; Raymond meets ex-girlfriend Kate.
| 3 | 3 | "Episode 3" | 15 October 2001 |
Barry is expelled from a computer course and decides to launch "The Boland Corporation."
| 4 | 4 | "Episode 4" | 22 October 2001 |
Barry and Raymond travel to County Donegal with Allison to visit her fiancé, Mark. Michael is wrapped up with Alana.
| 5 | 5 | "Episode 5" | 29 October 2001 |
With a baby on the way, Michael is desperate for work. Raymond takes Alisson for a day out.
| 6 | 6 | "Episode 6" | 5 November 2001 |
Kate has an accident; Raymond rushes to hospital to see her. Michael networks at a school reunion.
| 7 | 7 | "Episode 7" | 12 November 2001 |
Raymond makes a decision about Kate. Allison's fiancé visits Dublin.
| 8 | 8 | "Episode 8" | 19 November 2001 |
Raymond considers selling the house; Barry worries about facing his financial backers.

=== Season 2 (2002) ===
| No. overall | No. in season | Title | Original release date |
|---|---|---|---|
| 9 | 1 | "Episode 1" | 18 November 2002 |
Michael and Jane get married. Raymond meets Sally.
| 10 | 2 | "Episode 2" | 25 November 2002 |
Michael and Jane return from their honeymoon; Raymond has made an impression on Sally. Allison returns to Dublin.
| 11 | 3 | "Episode 3" | 2 December 2002 |
The new tenant Russell causes worries for Raymond.
| 12 | 4 | "Episode 4" | 9 December 2002 |
Sally wants to meet Alison; Russell's strange behaviour continues.
| 13 | 5 | "Episode 5" | 16 December 2002 |
Jane and Michael prepare to move out of No 49; Barry confronts Constance.
| 14 | 6 | "Episode 6" | 23 December 2002 |
Sally is not impressed with Raymond; Michael is sleeping on the couch; Barry is confronted by fatherhood and visits Constance.

=== Season 3 (2003) ===
| No. overall | No. in season | Title | Original release date |
|---|---|---|---|
| 15 | 1 | "Episode 1" | 10 November 2003 |
Raymond gets a teaching job in Mullingar.
| 16 | 2 | "Episode 2" | 17 November 2003 |
Raymond begins to teach; Barry wants more responsibility at work.
| 17 | 3 | "Episode 3" | 24 November 2003 |
Michael spends his time with another taxi driver. Barry signs a band called 'The Margins'. Raymond's parents visit.
| 18 | 4 | "Episode 4" | 1 December 2003 |
Alison is fed up with living with Raymond's parents. Terry offers Allison the room above the gallery.
| 19 | 5 | "Episode 5" | 8 December 2003 |
Michael is unprepared for his law exams.
| 20 | 6 | "Episode 6" | 15 December 2003 |
Raymond regrets goading Allison into flying off with Terry. Michael helps Barry and Vicky reach a deal with the record company.

=== Christmas Special (2006) ===
| No. | Title | Original release date |
|---|---|---|
| 21 | "Christmas Special" | 26 December 2006 |
Raymond is living alone and trying to write; Michael is stuck at home with parents; Barry is successful in London. They reunite.

== Release ==
Only the first series has been released on DVD; music rights issues have prevented the release of seasons 2 and 3. It was made available for streaming via the RTÉ Player in 2018.

== Reception ==
The series was named "Best Drama" at the 1st Irish Film & Television Awards, with Delaney nominated for the Leading actor prize. The series has gained something of cult status in Ireland since its release.

=== Critical response ===
On IMDB, the Bachelors Walk has an average approval rating of 8/10 based on 182 reviews.
