= Keith McErlean =

Irish actor

- Born: Carndonagh, County Donegal, Ireland
- Education: Gaiety School of Acting
- Known for: Bachelors Walk, Raw, Vikings

Keith McErlean (born 1975 or 1976) is an Irish actor from Carndonagh in Inishowen, County Donegal, in Ireland. His career began when he graduated from the Gaiety School of Acting in 1998. McErlean has appeared in a number of plays for the Abbey Theatre and Peacock Theatre, including Making History, Lovers at Versailles, and Tartuffe.

He is known for his role as Barry in all three series (2001 to 2006) of Bachelors Walk for RTÉ. In 2004, he played Declan Breen in the film The Blackwater Lightship, adapted for CBS from Colm Tóibín's original novel. In 2006, he played Vernon Todmann in the movie Flyboys. From 2008 until 2013, he appeared in the RTÉ series Raw playing the character of Shane Harte, in which he was nominated for outstanding actor in a TV drama at the 49th Monte-Carlo Television Festival. He played Adam Lynch in the TV series Trivia, and received a nomination for a Golden Nymph at the 51st Monte Carlo Television Festival, this time for 'outstanding actor in a comedy series'.
