= The Lion of Africa =

- Genre: Action; Adventure
- Written by: Bruce Franklin Singer
- Directed by: Kevin Connor
- Starring: Brian Dennehy; Brooke Adams; Yosef Shiloach; Don Warrington; Carl Andrews; Katherine Schofield
- Composer: George S. Clinton
- Country of origin: United States
- Original language: English

Production
- Producer: Yoram Ben-Ami
- Cinematography: Dennis Lewiston
- Editor: Bernard Gribble
- Running time: 115 minutes
- Production company: HBO Pictures

Original release
- Network: HBO
- Release: June 28, 1987

The Lion of Africa is a 1987 American adventure film directed by Kevin Connor and written by Bruce Franklin Singer. The film stars Brian Dennehy, Brooke Adams, Yosef Shiloach, Don Warrington, Carl Andrews and Katherine Schofield. The film premiered on June 28, 1987, on HBO.

== Cast ==
- Brian Dennehy as Sam Marsh
- Brooke Adams as Grace Danet
- Yosef Shiloach as Valentim
- Don Warrington as Henry Piggot
- Carl Andrews as Jemmy Banta
- Katherine Schofield as Cecilia
- Joe Chege as Wallace
- Tony Msalame as African Doctor
- Oliver Litondo as Sergeant
- William Tsuma as Joko
- Rose Maruru as Joko's Girlfriend
- Edwin Mahinda as Joko's Brother
- Mwangangi Ndunda as Kandinko Shaman
- Margaret Averdling as Jemmy's Wife
