= The Kitchen Toto =

1988 British drama film

- Theatrical release poster
- Directed by: Harry Hook
- Written by: Harry Hook
- Produced by: Ann Skinner
- Starring: Bob Peck; Phyllis Logan; Edwin Mahinda
- Cinematography: Roger Deakins
- Edited by: Tom Priestley
- Music by: John E. Keane
- Production companies: British Screen Productions; Channel Four Films; Skreba Films
- Distributed by: Cannon Films
- Release date: 13 May 1988
- Running time: 96 minutes
- Country: United Kingdom
- Language: English
- Budget: £1.77 million

The Kitchen Toto is a 1988 British drama film written and directed by Harry Hook and starring Edwin Mahinda, Bob Peck and Phyllis Logan.

== Plot ==
In Kenya in 1950, a British policeman takes a murdered black priest's son to live with him at his home as a houseboy. As war breaks out, loyalties are tested and the young boy is fodder for opposing sides. Although grateful to be able to work, he longs for community.

== Cast ==
- Edwin Mahinda as Mwangi
- Bob Peck as John Graham
- Phyllis Logan as Janet Graham
- Nicholas Charles as Mugo
- Ronald Pirie as Edward Graham
- Robert Urquhart as D.C. McKinnon
- Kirsten Hughes as Mary McKinnon
- Edward Judd as Dick Luis
- Nathan Dambuza Mdledle as Mzee, Mwangi's Father
- Ann Wanjuga as Mwangi's Mother
- Job Seda as Kamau
- Leo Wringer as Sergeant Stephen
- Paul Onsongo as Thenge Oath giver
