= Created By =

1993 novel by Richard Christian Matheson

- Author: Richard Christian Matheson
- Cover artist: Larry Lurin
- Language: English
- Genre: Horror
- Published: 1993 Bantam Books
- Publication place: United States
- Media type: Print (paperback)
- Pages: 383 pp (paperback edition)
- ISBN: 0-553-56610-5 (paperback edition)
- OCLC: 31026150

Created By is a 1993 horror novel written by Richard Christian Matheson. It was first published by Bantam Books.
