= Theron Read =

American actor

Theron David Read
- Born: September 25, 1964; Burbank, California, United States
- Died: July 20, 2009 (aged 44); Salt Lake City, Utah, United States
- Burial place: Elysian Burial Gardens, Millcreek, Utah, United States
- Occupation: Actor
- Years active: 1984–1995

Theron David Read (September 25, 1964 – July 20, 2009), was an American film actor.

== Career ==
He was most remembered for his role as Mark Bojeekus in the 1987 comedy Three O'Clock High. He also had parts in the films Plan 10 from Outer Space, Teenage Bonnie and Klepto Clyde, Neon City, Promised Land, and High School Spirits. He also appeared in the 1989 slasher sequel Halloween 5: The Revenge of Michael Myers, although his scenes were ultimately cut from the final film; for years, the footage was considered lost, but it was eventually re-discovered by Scream Factory in 2021, and was included as a bonus feature on the company's 4K UHD Blu-Ray release of the film that same year, making the long-lost footage viewable for the first time ever.

== Death ==
Read was found dead on a TRAX light-rail train in Salt Lake City, Utah, on July 20, 2009. His death was discovered by authorities when he failed to deboard the train at its last stop. He died of congestive heart failure. His remains were interred in Elysian Burial Gardens in Millcreek, Utah on July 27, 2009.

== Filmography ==
Year	Title	Role	Notes
1984	Ferdinand the Bull	Bullfighter	TV movie
1986	High School Spirits	Malone	Feature film
1987	Promised Land	Harting	Feature film
1987	Three O'Clock High	Mark Bojeekus	Feature film
1988	Werewolf	Freddie	Season 1, Episode 29: "Amazing Grace"
1989	Halloween 5: The Revenge of Michael Myers	Dr. Death	Feature film; Scenes cut, released in 2021
1989	The Making of 'Halloween 5'	Himself	Behind-the-scenes documentary
1991	Dream Machine	Man in Bathroom	Feature film
1991	Neon City	Charred Man	Feature film
1993	Teenage Bonnie and Klepto Clyde	Rocker #1	Feature film
1995	Plan 10 from Outer Space	Jason	Feature film
2007	The Usual Stuff	—N/a	Writer; short film
