= Edwin Mahinda =

Kenyan actor

- Born: Edwin Mahinda; Kenya
- Occupation: Actor
- Years active: 1987–1989
- Awards: Paris Film Festival Award

Edwin Mahinda is a retired Kenyan actor. Starting his cinema career as a child artist, Mahinda is best known for the roles in the films The Kitchen Toto, White Mischief and The Lion of Africa.

== Career ==
In 1987, Mahinda made his maiden cinema appearance with the British drama film The Kitchen Toto. He played the lead role 'Mwangi' in the film, where he later won the Paris Film Festival Award for Best Actor. With the success of the film, he was then selected for the 1987 film White Mischief for the minor role of 'Boy Waiter at Wake'. However, in 1988, he again played the supportive role 'Joko's Brother' in the American adventure film The Lion of Africa. The film had its premiere on June 28, 1987, on HBO.

In 1989, Mahinda made his final film appearance. He played the role of 'Moja' in the Piramiddo no kanata ni: White Lion densetsu.

== Filmography ==
Year	Film	Role	Genre	Ref.
1987	The Kitchen Toto	Mwangi	Film	
1987	White Mischief	Boy Waiter at Wake	Film	
1988	The Lion of Africa	Joko's Brother	TV movie	
1989	Piramiddo no kanata ni: White Lion densetsu	Moja	Film	
