= Stacey Glick =

American actress

- Born: 1971 or 1972 (age 54–55)
- Occupation: Actress
- Years active: 1982–1987

Stacey Glick (born 1971 or 1972) is an American former child actress who is now a literary agent.

Her most prominent roles came in the late-1980s in the films Brighton Beach Memoirs (1986) and Three O'Clock High (1987). The latter was also her last film role.

Glick got into acting when a manager of the Miss Long Island Contest saw promise in her acting skills and sent her to a theatrical agent. She soon got spots in a number of commercials, starting with one for Thomas' English Muffins. Her film debut came in the 1981 TV movie The Day the Loving Stopped, where she played a younger version of the role played by Ally Sheedy in the movie. She also appeared in the Off-Broadway production of Twelve Dreams at The Public Theater and for some time on the NBC soap opera Search for Tomorrow

Glick went to high school at South Side High School in Rockville Centre, New York, missing her first day due to filming for Brighton Beach Memoirs.

After college Glick worked in film/TV development for five years, and then became a literary agent.
