= Tony Msalame =

Kenyan actor and media personality (1954 – 2010)

- Born: Tony Msalame Mwashumbe; 12 December 1954; Taita, Kenya
- Died: 28 May 2010 (aged 55); Mombasa, Kenya
- Education: Samburu Primary School; Ruiru Secondary School
- Occupations: Actor, media personality
- Years active: 1980–2010

Tony Msalame Mwashumbe (12 December 1954 – 28 May 2010), was a Kenyan actor and media personality. One of the most respected media personalities in Kenyan broadcasting history, Msalame also established as an actor in the film The Lion of Africa and television soapie Tushauriane.

== Personal life ==
He was born on 12 December 1954 in Taita, Kenya as the second son of the family. His father, Chrispas Mwashumbe was a Chief Inspector. His mother, Grace Sowairina Mwashumbe was a housewife. He had 6 siblings: Dorothy Mkakim, Sheila Kale, Arnold Magah, Lorna Mwashumbe, Jacob Mwashumbe and Surprise Mwashumbe. In 1967, his mother died shortly after his youngest sibling Surprise was born.

With his father's job, he had to move in several regions, where he completed primary education from several schools including; Buxton Primary School Mombasa, D.E.B. Pumwani Primary and Kisumu Union Primary School. Finally he completed KCPE Examination in 1970 from Samburu Primary School. Then he attended Ruiru Secondary School and completed O-level examination in 1974. During this period, he regularly visited his maternal uncle who was a broadcaster, Job Isaac Mwamto.

After completing O-level, he resided at Upper Woodley residence with his uncle and where he generated a passion for radio broadcasting. During the television series Visa vya Safari, he met his future wife, Pauline Mukuhi. They were solemnized customarily on 3 May 1986 and later formalized on 26 May 1989 at the Attorney Generals Chambers. The couple had two daughters, Grace Sowairina, born on 10 July 1986 and Natasha Waithera, born on 19 October 1990.

== Career ==
Initially he had a short stint at NSSF and Immigration Department. Later he joined with Ogilvy & Mather Advertising Agency and worked for 20 years. In early 1980s, he started to work at Voice of Kenya (currently known as KBC). During this period, he became famous for his program Ongeza Maarifa. In 1996, he joined 'Metro FM' and made the program Shekki Leggi which aired on weekends. In 2004, he moved to Mombasa and launched 'Shekki FM'.

He started his acting career in theater with the plays at the Kenyan National Theater including The Government Inspector and Mabepari wa Venisi as well as in the television Drama Visa vya Safari where he met his future wife. In 1988, Msalame played the role of a 'doctor' in the HBO film The Lion of Africa. He also starred in the soapie Tushauriane and played the role of 'Mwalimu wa Walimu Dennis'.

== Death ==
On 28 May 2010, Msalame died after collapsing at his Shekki FM studios at his home in Nyali. The postmortem confirmed the death was due to sudden heart attack.

== Filmography ==
Year	Film	Role	Genre	Ref.
1988	The Lion of Africa	Doctor	Film	
1989	Tushauriane	Mwalimu wa Walimu Dennis	TV series	
