= Liza Morrow =

American actress

- Occupation: Television actress

Liza Morrow is an American actress. She played Virginia Metheny in the final (1988–1989) season of the television soap opera Dynasty. She also played the role of Karen in the movie Three O'Clock High in 1987.

Morrow currently works as a Realtor in Florida.
