= Richard Christian Matheson =

American novelist (born 1953)

- Born: October 14, 1953 (age 73); United States
- Occupations: Novelist; short story writer; screenwriter
- Parent: Richard Matheson (father)
- Writing career
- Genres: Science fiction, fantasy, horror, film, television

Richard Christian Matheson (born October 14, 1953) is an American writer of horror fiction and screenplays, the son of fiction writer and screenwriter Richard Matheson. He is the author of over 100 short stories of psychological horror and magic realism which are gathered in over 150 major anthologies and in his critically hailed hardcover short story collections Scars and Other Distinguishing Marks, Amazon #1 bestseller Dystopia, and Zoopraxis.

He is the author of the suspense novel Created By which was nominated for a Bram Stoker Award for Best First Novel. He also authored a magical realism novella set in Hollywood titled The Ritual of Illusion, and was the editor of the commemorative book Stephen King's Battleground. Matheson also adapted the short story which was made into an iconic episode of the TNT series Nightmares & Dreamscapes: From the Stories of Stephen King and won two Emmys.

He wrote or co-wrote the screenplays for Three O'Clock High, Full Eclipse, It Takes Two, Loose Cannons, Shifter, Midvale The Nature of Evil (co-written with his father Richard Matheson), Paradise, It Waits, Happy Face Killer, Voices of Midway, "Red Sleep", "Hooky", Dean Koontz's Soul Survivor as a 4-hour mini series, three Masters of Horror episodes, Stephen King's Big Driver, and Nightmare Cinema. He wrote for the magazines Amazing Stories and Tales From The Crypt among the others, and he is the author of the miniseries Nightmares & Dreamscapes and adapted as four-hour miniseries H. G. Wells' The Time Machine, Roger Zelazny's The Chronicles of Amber and Whitley Strieber's Majestic. Matheson also wrote comedy and drama pilots for major studios and networks. He co-created, co-executive produced and co-wrote all thirteen episodes of the Cinemax series Chemistry. He has been executive story consultant, supervising producer and executive producer for network television series. He is also the co-executive producer of the films Cub, It Waits, Paradise, Full Eclipse and Big Driver.

== Selected filmography ==
- Three's Company (1978) (1 episode)
- The Incredible Hulk (1978–79) (3 episodes)
- The Misadventures of Sheriff Lobo (1979) (1 episode)
- Stone (1980) (1 episode)
- Enos (1980) (1 episode)
- B.J. and the Bear (1981) (1 episode)
- The Powers of Matthew Star (1982) (3 episodes)
- Knight Rider (1982) (1 episode)
- The A-Team (1983–86) (25 episodes)
- Hardcastle and McCormick (1984–85) (4 episodes)
- Hunter (1985) (2 episodes)
- Amazing Stories (1986–87) (2 episodes)
- Three O'Clock High (1987) (Film; with Thomas E. Szollosi)
- It Takes Two (1988) (Film; with Thomas E. Szollosi)
- Loose Cannons (1990) (Film; with Richard Matheson and Bob Clark)
- Tales from the Crypt (1991) (1 episode)
- The Torkelsons (1992) (3 episodes)
- Full Eclipse (1993) (TV movie; with Michael Reaves)
- Arousal (1996) (Short film; writer and director)
- Sole Survivor (2000) (TV movie)
- Paradise (2004) (TV movie; co-writer/creator/executive producer w/ Norman Steinberg)
- It Waits (2005) (Direct-to-video)
- Masters of Horror (2005–06) (2 episodes)
- Nightmares & Dreamscapes: From the Stories of Stephen King (2006) (Miniseries, 1 episode)
- Shockers (2013) (Unsold pilot and four episodes; creator/writer/director)
- Chemistry (2011) (13 episodes; co-writer/creator/executive producer with Norman Steinberg)
- Happy Face Killer (2014) (TV movie)
- Big Driver (2014) (TV movie; writer/co-executive producer)
- Voices of Midway (2014) (Short film)
- Nightmare Cinema (2018) (Film; segment "Mirari")

== See also ==
- List of horror fiction authors
- Splatterpunk
