= Daniel Mann =

American stage, film and television director

- Born: Daniel Chugerman; August 8, 1912; Brooklyn, New York, U.S.
- Died: November 21, 1991 (aged 79); Los Angeles, California, U.S.
- Spouse(s): Mary Kathleen Williams (1948 -?; divorced); Sherry Presnell (1971-?; divorced)
- Children: 3

Daniel Chugerman (August 8, 1912 – November 21, 1991), known professionally as Daniel Mann, was an American stage, film and television director.

Originally trained as an actor by Sanford Meisner, between 1952 and 1987 he directed over 31 feature films and made-for-television. Considered a true "actor's director", he directed seven Oscar-nominated and two Tony Award-winning performances, collaborating with actors like Burt Lancaster, Shirley Booth, Susan Hayward, Marlon Brando, Elizabeth Taylor, Dean Martin and Anthony Quinn.

He was nominated for several accolades, including two Palme d'Or, three Directors Guild of America Awards and a Golden Bear.

== Biography ==
Mann was born in Brooklyn, New York, the son of Helen and Samuel Chugerman, a lawyer. He was a stage actor since childhood and attended Erasmus Hall High School, New York's Professional Children's School and the Neighborhood Playhouse. He entered films in 1952 as a director and is known for his excellent ear for dialogue. Most of Mann's films were adaptations from the stage (Come Back Little Sheba, The Rose Tattoo, The Teahouse of the August Moon, Hot Spell) and literature (BUtterfield 8, The Last Angry Man).

Mann died of heart failure in Los Angeles, California, in November 1991. He is buried in the Jewish Cemetery Hillside Memorial Park. He had three children with his first wife, actress Mary Kathleen Williams: Michael Mann, Erica Mann Ramis and Alex Mann. Erica Mann Ramis is the widow of director Harold Ramis.

== Filmography as director ==
- Come Back, Little Sheba (1952)
- About Mrs. Leslie (1954)
- The Rose Tattoo (1955)
- I'll Cry Tomorrow (1955)
- The Teahouse of the August Moon (1956)
- Hot Spell (1958)
- The Last Angry Man (1959)
- BUtterfield 8 (1960)
- The Mountain Road (1960)
- Ada (1961)
- Who's Got the Action? (1962)
- Five Finger Exercise (1962)
- Who's Been Sleeping in My Bed? (1963)
- Our Man Flint (1966)
- Judith (1966)
  - released as Conflict on home video
- For Love of Ivy (1968)
- A Dream of Kings (1969)
- Willard (1971)
- The Revengers (1972)
  - released as Los Vengadores in Mexico
- Another Part of the Forest (1972) (TV)
- Maurie (1973)
  - also known as Big Mo
- Interval (1973)
  - released as Intervalo in Mexico
- Lost in the Stars (1974)
- Journey into Fear (1975)
  - also known as Burn Out
- How the West Was Won (1977) (TV miniseries)
- Matilda (1978)
- Playing for Time (1980) (TV)
- The Day the Loving Stopped (1981) (TV)
- The Man Who Broke 1,000 Chains (1987) (TV)
  - also known as Unchained

== Select theatre credits ==
- The Immoralist (1954)

== Awards ==
- Nominee Grand Prize of Festival, Come Back, Little Sheba - Cannes Film Festival (1952)
- Winner International Prize, Come Back, Little Sheba - Cannes Film Festival (1952)
- Nominee Best Director, Come Back, Little Sheba - Directors Guild of America (1952)
- Nominee Palme d'Or, I'll Cry Tomorrow - Cannes Film Festival (1955)
- Nominee Best Director, The Rose Tattoo - Directors Guild of America (1955)
- Nominee Best Director, The Teahouse of the August Moon - 'Directors Guild of America (1956)
- Nominee Golden Bear, The Teahouse of the August Moon - Berlin International Film Festival (1956)
