= Three O'Clock High =

1987 film by Phil Joanou

- Theatrical release poster
- Directed by: Phil Joanou
- Written by: Richard Christian Matheson; Thomas Szollosi
- Produced by: David E. Vogel
- Starring: Casey Siemaszko; Anne Ryan; Richard Tyson; Jeffrey Tambor; Philip Baker Hall; John P. Ryan
- Cinematography: Barry Sonnenfeld
- Edited by: Joe Ann Fogle
- Music by: Tangerine Dream
- Distributed by: Universal Pictures
- Release date: October 9, 1987
- Running time: 90 minutes
- Country: United States
- Language: English
- Budget: $5 million
- Box office: $3.6 million

Three O'Clock High is a 1987 American teen comedy film directed by Phil Joanou. The script, about a meek high schooler who is forced into a fight with an unstable new transfer student, is based on the high school experiences of screenwriters Richard Christian Matheson and Thomas Szollosi. The film was a box-office bomb and received mixed reviews from critics. It was filmed at Ogden High School in Ogden, Utah.

== Plot ==
Meek high school student Jerry Mitchell and his sister, Brei, are home alone while their parents are on vacation. The Weaver High School students this morning gossip about new student Buddy Revell, an allegedly violent psychopathic delinquent transferred from a continuation high school.

Jerry's day begins at the school newspaper, where his best friend, Vincent Costello, is editor. Their journalism teacher suggests an article to welcome the new kid, Buddy, and assigns Jerry an interview. Jerry sees Buddy in the restroom and clumsily attempts to introduce himself, but realizes he is annoying Buddy. He tells Buddy to disregard the interview request and taps Buddy's arm affably. Buddy, who has a touch phobia, throws Jerry against a wall and declares the pair will fight outside school at 3:00 P.M. Buddy warns that running away or reporting the incident would only worsen matters.

As time runs out, Jerry tries different strategies to avoid fighting. Attempts to reason with Buddy do not work. Vincent plants a switchblade in Buddy's locker to get him kicked out of school; Brei advises Jerry to skip school, but in his mom's car, Jerry finds the switchblade stuck in the steering wheel, and the ignition wires cut. Jerry tries to run, but an overzealous security guard, Duke, catches him. Duke finds the switchblade and takes Jerry to the Dean of Discipline, Mr. Dolinski, who warns that Jerry is under suspicion.

Jerry's further attempts to avoid the fight are not successful until he steals cash from the school's student store. Buddy ultimately accepts the cash to call off the fight, but proclaims Jerry a coward for not even trying to fight. Seized with self-loathing and anger, Jerry confronts Buddy and demands the money back. Buddy refuses, and Jerry agrees to the fight.

The clock finally reaches the appointed hour, and the fight begins before hundreds of eager students. Principal O’Rourke tries to break it up, but when he touches Buddy's shoulder, Buddy punches him out. Duke and Franny also intervene, but Buddy knocks out Duke and throws Franny aside. Jerry, though out-matched, stands his ground while being knocked down. Buddy takes out his brass knuckles, but Vincent distracts him, and he drops the weapon, which Brei picks up and slips to Jerry. Jerry desperately uses the brass knuckles to punch Buddy, knocking him out and winning the fight. During the subsequent excitement and police arrival, Buddy vanishes while Jerry is let go for the day.

The next day, students show Jerry their admiration and support. They buy individual sheets of paper for $1 from the school store to make up the missing cash. Buddy appears, silencing the crowd, and returns the money to Jerry. Weaver is filled with new gossip, as Jerry, now allegedly dating his crush Karen, replaces Buddy as the hot topic. Rumors deviate far from the truth.

== Cast ==
- Casey Siemaszko as Jerry Mitchell
- Anne Ryan as Franny Perrins
- Richard Tyson as Buddy Revell
- Stacey Glick as Brei Mitchell
- Jonathan Wise as Vincent Costello
- Jeffrey Tambor as Mr. Rice
- Philip Baker Hall as Detective Mulvahill
- John P. Ryan as Mr. O'Roark
- Theron Read as Mark Bojeekus
- Liza Morrow as Karen Clark
- Guy Massey as Scott Cranston
- Mike Jolly as Craig Mattey
- Scott Tiler as Bruce Chalmer
- Charles Macaulay as Voytek Dolinski
- Caitlin O'Heaney as Miss Farmer
- Alice Nunn as Nurse Palmer
- Paul Feig as Hall monitor
- Mitch Pileggi as Duke, School Security Guard
- Yeardley Smith as Cheerleader

== Soundtrack ==
Three O'Clock High
- 1987 U.S. CD cover

Soundtrack album by Tangerine Dream
- Released: 1987
- Recorded: 1987
- Genre: Electronic
- Length: 41:42
- Label: Varèse Sarabande

Tangerine Dream chronology
Tyger (1987)	Three O'Clock High (1987)	Near Dark (1988)

The film's soundtrack is the thirty-first major release and ninth soundtrack album by Tangerine Dream. Additional music was provided by Sylvester Levay. The song, "Something to Remember Me By", was written and performed by Jim Walker.

=== Track listing ===
No.	Title	Music	Length
1.	"It's Jerry's Day Today"		0:44
2.	"46-32-15"		0:47
3.	"No Detention"		1:01
4.	"Any School Bully Will Do"		0:33
5.	"Go to the Head of the Class"		3:10
6.	"Sit"	Sylvester Levay	0:47
7.	"The Fight"	Sylvester Levay	2:35
8.	"Jerry's Decision"	Sylvester Levay	4:28
9.	"The Fight is On"	Sylvester Levay	4:39
10.	"Paper"	Sylvester Levay	1:28
11.	"Big, Bright Brass Knuckles"		1:18
12.	"Buying Paper Like it's Going Out of Style"		1:35
13.	"Dangerous Trend"		0:54
14.	"Who's Chasing Who"		0:59
15.	"Bonding By Candlelight"		1:35
16.	"You'll Never Believe It"		2:19
17.	"Starting The Day Off Right"		1:16
18.	"Weak At The Knees"		2:34
19.	"Kill Him (The Football Dummy)"		1:04
20.	"Not So Quiet in the Library/Get Lost In A Crowd"		1:34
21.	"Something to Remember Me By"	Jim Walker	4:12
22.	"Arrival"	Rick Morotta and David Tickle	2:10

=== Personnel ===
- Edgar Froese
- Chris Franke
- Paul Haslinger

== Release ==
=== Box office ===
The film opened in 849 theaters nationwide on October 9, 1987, and earned $1,506,975 on its opening weekend, 40.9% of its total gross. The total lifetime gross is approximately $3,685,862, against the original budget of $5,000,000.

=== Critical response ===
The film earned mixed reviews, and has a "fresh" rating of 60% on review aggregator website Rotten Tomatoes based on 15 critical reviews. Metacritic, which uses a weighted average, assigned the film a score of 36 out of 100, based on 9 critics, indicating "generally unfavorable" reviews.

Roger Ebert of The Chicago Sun-Times gave the film one out of four stars, declaring the plot to be "pretty stupid" and lamenting that the bully Buddy Revell, "the most interesting character", was underdeveloped.

In a retrospective review from 2016, critic Rob Hunter called the film "a wildly inventive and energetic look at the failures and successes of a typical high school day, and it shapes the daydreams and anxieties into an exaggerated delight".

The dark tone of the film contrasted with other teen films of the time—so much so that executive producer Steven Spielberg removed his name from the credits. In 2017, Adrian Halen wrote that Three O'Clock High was released in "an era when The Breakfast Club, Pretty in Pink, Ferris Bueller's Day Off, National Lampoon’s Vacation and Weird Science were the general norm for moviegoers".

== See also ==
- High Noon, 1952 film
- Fist Fight, 2017 film
- List of teen films
