= Todd Loyd =

American actor

Todd Loyd (born December 20, 1975) is an American theatre director, actor, teacher, artistic director, and entrepreneur (Not to be confused with Todd Loyd actor/author.)

== Biography ==
Loyd attended the Pacific Conservatory for the Performing Arts in Santa Maria, California, the University of North Carolina School of the Arts in Winston-Salem, North Carolina (BFA) and Touro College (MA in Early Childhood and Special Education). His assisting credits on Broadway include Baz Luhrmann's "La Boheme" (2002) and "The Color Purple" (2005). He has worked at The Kennedy Center, Lincoln Center, the Eugene O'Neill Playwrights Conference, New York Musical Theatre Festival, National Alliance for Musical Theatre and Cedar Lake Contemporary Ballet.

He served as the Producing Artistic Director of Sonnet Repertory Theatre. At present, he works with nursery school children in New York City and hosts the Little Kids, Big Hearts podcast in partnership with Noggin and Sparkler Learning. The podcast can help parents and educators introduce big topics in social and emotional learning to their children and explores what it means to have a big heart and how to grow one with episodes focused on identity, friendship, and standing up for others.

Through Sonnet Repertory Theatre, Loyd has worked with Christine Baranski, Susan Blackwell, Celia Keenan-Bolger, Jeff Bowen, Tituss Burgess, Kerry Butler, Jason Robert Brown, Michael Cerveris, Olympia Dukakis, William Finn, Stephen Flaherty, Adam Guettel, Victor Garber, Jonathan Groff, Ethan Hawke, Megan Hilty, Hal Holbrook, Cheyenne Jackson, Brian d'Arcy James, Carol Kane, Tom Kitt, Kevin Kline, Henry Krieger, Linda Lavin, Robert Sean Leonard, Robert Lopez, Patti LuPone, Jerry Mitchell, Terrence Mann, Alan Menken, Lou Meyers, David Miller, Julia Murney, Marsha Norman, Manu Narayan, Mandy Patinkin, David Rasche, Chita Rivera, Duncan Sheik, David Shire, Julie Taymor, Alfred Uhry, Marc Shaiman and Scott Wittman, and Alfre Woodard. Sonnet Repertory Theatre's advisory board includes Paul Barnes, Gary Beach, William Cantler, Gerald Freedman, Peter Hedges, Joe Mantello, Jack O’Brien, Mary-Louise Parker, Bernard Telsey, and Celia Weston.
