= Anne Ryan (actress) =

American actress

- Born: 1969 (age 56–57); Arlington Heights, Illinois, U.S.
- Occupation: Actress
- Years active: 1986–2006, 2017–present

Anne Ryan (born 1969), also known as Annie Ryan, is an American film, television and theatre actress as well as a theatre director. She is based in Dublin, Ireland.

Ryan is known for such films and television series as Three O'Clock High, Ferris Bueller's Day Off, Lucas, Bachelors Walk and Laws of Attraction.

== Filmography ==
- Lucas (as Angie, credited as Anne Ryan)
- Ferris Bueller's Day Off (as Shermerite, credited as Anne Ryan)
- Three O'Clock High (as Franny Perrins, credited as Anne Ryan)
- The Last Bus Home (as Reena)
- Bachelors Walk (as Kate, 3 episodes)
- The Actors (as Actor in Richard III)
- Laws of Attraction (as TV Host)
