= Carl Andrews (actor) =

British actor

Carl Andrews (1947 – 1990) was a British character actor. Andrews' most notable role was as garage mechanic Joe MacDonald, one of British soap opera's first, and longest serving, recurring black characters, in the original version of the popular motel soap Crossroads. Andrews remained in the role from 1978 until 1986.
