= List of Batman (TV series) episodes =

The following is an episode list for the 1966 Batman television series starring Adam West and Burt Ward.

== Series overview ==
| Season | Episodes | Story arcs | Originally released | |
| Season | Episodes | Story arcs | First released | Last released |
|---|---|---|---|---|
| 1 | 34 | 17 | January 12, 1966 | May 5, 1966 |
| 2 | 60 | 29 | September 7, 1966 | March 30, 1967 |
| 3 | 26 | 20 | September 14, 1967 | March 14, 1968 |

== Episodes ==
=== Season 1 (1966) ===
Season 1 aired two episodes per week, on Wednesdays and Thursdays at 7:30 p.m. ET/PT, and followed a single storyline per week.

| No. overall | No. in season | Title | Directed by | Written by | Original release date | Special Guest Villain |
|---|---|---|---|---|---|---|
| 1 | 1 | "Hi Diddle Riddle" | Robert Butler | Lorenzo Semple Jr. | January 12, 1966 | The Riddler (Frank Gorshin); Molly (Jill St. John) |
| 2 | 2 | "Smack in the Middle" | Robert Butler | Lorenzo Semple Jr. | January 13, 1966 | The Riddler (Frank Gorshin); Molly (Jill St. John) |
While the Riddler maneuvers Batman into being sued, the Dynamic Duo investigate the supervillain's concurrent scheme.
| 3 | 3 | "Fine Feathered Finks" | Robert Butler | Lorenzo Semple Jr. | January 19, 1966 | The Penguin (Burgess Meredith) |
| 4 | 4 | "The Penguin's a Jinx" | Robert Butler | Lorenzo Semple Jr. | January 20, 1966 | The Penguin (Burgess Meredith) |
The Penguin plots to manipulate Batman into inadvertently devising capers for him.
| 5 | 5 | "The Joker Is Wild" | Don Weis | Robert Dozier | January 26, 1966 | The Joker (Cesar Romero) |
| 6 | 6 | "Batman Is Riled" | Don Weis | Robert Dozier | January 27, 1966 | The Joker (Cesar Romero) |
The Joker decides to fight fire with fire against Batman with a utility belt of his own.
| 7 | 7 | "Instant Freeze" | Robert Butler | Max Hodge | February 2, 1966 | Mr. Freeze (George Sanders) |
| 8 | 8 | "Rats Like Cheese" | Robert Butler | Max Hodge | February 3, 1966 | Mr. Freeze (George Sanders) |
Dr. Shivel aka Mr. Freeze has returned and is seeking revenge on Batman, who accidentally spilled a freeze solution on him, forcing him to live in a climate 50 degrees below zero. He commits crimes involving diamonds, or "ice", in different forms.
| 9 | 9 | "Zelda the Great" | Norman Foster | Lorenzo Semple Jr. | February 9, 1966 | Zelda The Great (Anne Baxter); Eivol Ekdal (Jack Kruschen; not billed as Extra Special Guest Villain) |
| 10 | 10 | "A Death Worse Than Fate" | Norman Foster | Lorenzo Semple Jr. | February 10, 1966 | Zelda The Great (Anne Baxter); Eivol Ekdal (Jack Kruschen; not billed as Extra Special Guest Villain) |
The Dynamic Duo arranges a trap for an elusive annual bank robber, but the female magician they are hunting is on to them with a new scheme of her own.
| 11 | 11 | "A Riddle a Day Keeps the Riddler Away" | Tom Gries | Fred De Gorter | February 16, 1966 | The Riddler (Frank Gorshin) |
| 12 | 12 | "When the Rat's Away the Mice Will Play" | Tom Gries | Fred De Gorter | February 17, 1966 | The Riddler (Frank Gorshin) |
When a visiting King is accosted by the Riddler, the Dynamic Duo pursues his subsequent complex trail of riddles to try to stop him.
| 13 | 13 | "The Thirteenth Hat" | Norman Foster | Charles Hoffman | February 23, 1966 | The Mad Hatter (David Wayne) |
| 14 | 14 | "Batman Stands Pat" | Norman Foster | Charles Hoffman | February 24, 1966 | The Mad Hatter (David Wayne) |
Jervis Tetch, aka the Mad Hatter, is abducting all the jurors who convicted him of a previous crime wave. He is also taking their hats. His final target is none other than Batman, who provided the key testimony in the Mad Hatter's trial.
| 15 | 15 | "The Joker Goes to School" | Murray Golden | Lorenzo Semple Jr. | March 2, 1966 | The Joker (Cesar Romero) |
| 16 | 16 | "He Meets His Match, The Grisly Ghoul" | Murray Golden | Lorenzo Semple Jr. | March 3, 1966 | The Joker (Cesar Romero) |
The Joker strikes at the high school level when his rigged vending machines give out stocks, bonds, and silver dollars. It's all part of his sinister scheme to blackmail the school’s basketball team.
| 17 | 17 | "True or False-Face" | William A. Graham | Stephen Kandel | March 9, 1966 | False Face (Malachi Throne, billed only as "?" before the end of part 2) |
| 18 | 18 | "Holy Rat Race" | William A. Graham | Stephen Kandel | March 10, 1966 | False Face (Malachi Throne, billed only as "?" before the end of part 2) |
A master of disguise, False Face, is on the loose in Gotham City and launches a barrage of tricky true-or-false crimes including replacing a bank's real money with counterfeits.
| 19 | 19 | "The Purr-fect Crime" | James Sheldon | Stanley Ralph Ross & Lee Orgel | March 16, 1966 | Catwoman (Julie Newmar) |
| 20 | 20 | "Better Luck Next Time" | James Sheldon | Stanley Ralph Ross & Lee Orgel | March 17, 1966 | Catwoman (Julie Newmar) |
Catwoman steals some priceless art but the importance of the crimes go beyond the taking of the objects involved.
| 21 | 21 | "The Penguin Goes Straight" | Leslie H. Martinson | Lorenzo Semple Jr. & John Cardwell | March 23, 1966 | The Penguin (Burgess Meredith) |
| 22 | 22 | "Not Yet, He Ain't" | Leslie H. Martinson | Lorenzo Semple Jr. & John Cardwell | March 24, 1966 | The Penguin (Burgess Meredith) |
The Penguin apparently goes straight, thwarting crimes across Gotham City and offering his services as a security expert. Batman doesn't believe it and sets out to prove the Penguin guilty of a crime, but the Dynamic Duo end up framed for jewel theft.
| 23 | 23 | "The Ring of Wax" | James B. Clark | Jack Paritz & Bob Rodgers | March 30, 1966 | The Riddler (Frank Gorshin) |
| 24 | 24 | "Give 'Em the Axe" | James B. Clark | Jack Paritz & Bob Rodgers | March 31, 1966 | The Riddler (Frank Gorshin) |
The Riddler's latest scheme involves stealing a wax figure to melt down for its wax that is powerfully corrosive when exposed to direct flame. He wants to open a vault of rare books to find the key to an ancient treasure.
| 25 | 25 | "The Joker Trumps an Ace" | Richard C. Sarafian | Francis M. Cockrell & Marian B. Cockrell | April 6, 1966 | The Joker (Cesar Romero) |
| 26 | 26 | "Batman Sets the Pace" | Richard C. Sarafian | Francis M. Cockrell & Marian B. Cockrell | April 7, 1966 | The Joker (Cesar Romero) |
A wave of senseless robberies by the Joker prove to be part of a plot against a visiting maharajah.
| 27 | 27 | "The Curse of Tut" | Charles R. Rondeau | Robert C. Dennis & Earl Barret | April 13, 1966 | King Tut (Victor Buono) |
| 28 | 28 | "The Pharaoh's in a Rut" | Charles R. Rondeau | Robert C. Dennis & Earl Barret | April 14, 1966 | King Tut (Victor Buono) |
A new villain called King Tut, a former academic who thinks he is really King Tut, prepares to claim Gotham City as his new Thebes.
| 29 | 29 | "The Bookworm Turns" | Larry Peerce | Hendrik Vollaerts | April 20, 1966 | The Bookworm (Roddy McDowall) |
| 30 | 30 | "While Gotham City Burns" | Larry Peerce | Hendrik Vollaerts | April 21, 1966 | The Bookworm (Roddy McDowall) |
When Commissioner Gordon's death is faked by the Bookworm, the Dynamic Duo must track down the literate criminal to find out what he is up to. Cameo by Jerry Lewis as himself during a wall climb by Batman & Robin.
| 31 | 31 | "Death in Slow Motion" | Charles R. Rondeau | Richard Carr | April 27, 1966 | The Riddler (Frank Gorshin) |
| 32 | 32 | "The Riddler's False Notion" | Charles R. Rondeau | Richard Carr | April 28, 1966 | The Riddler (Frank Gorshin) |
The Riddler is back, and is pursuing a silent movie theme with his latest scheme. As the Dynamic Duo pursue the Riddler, they discover the true purpose behind his cinematic caper and his ultimate target. Along the way Riddler abducts Robin and places him in a series of classic death-perils. Silent film star Francis X. Bushman appears as Mr. Van Jones in his final acting appearance before his death in August 1966.
| 33 | 33 | "Fine Finny Fiends" | Tom Gries | Sheldon Stark | May 4, 1966 | The Penguin (Burgess Meredith) |
| 34 | 34 | "Batman Makes the Scenes" | Tom Gries | Sheldon Stark | May 5, 1966 | The Penguin (Burgess Meredith) |
The Penguin has returned and has a dastardly plan involving Alfred, whom the Penguin captures and brainwashes to be his unwitting pawn for his scheme against a wealthy social event.

=== Film (1966) ===
A couple of months after the first season finished airing, a cinematic feature film of Batman premiered in theaters on July 30, 1966, featuring four of the most prominent villains, and new Bat Gadgets that were enabled by the bigger budget of the film. Julie Newmar, who had played Catwoman in Season 1, was unavailable to act in the film due to a back injury, and was replaced in the role by Lee Meriwether.

| Title | Directed by | Written by | Original release date | Special Guest Villains |
|---|---|---|---|---|
| Batman | Leslie H. Martinson | Lorenzo Semple Jr. | July 30, 1966 | Catwoman (Lee Meriwether) The Joker (Cesar Romero) The Penguin (Burgess Meredith) The Riddler (Frank Gorshin) |

=== Season 2 (1966–67) ===
As with the first season, Season 2 aired two episodes per week, on Wednesdays and Thursdays at 7:30 p.m. ET/PT. The two episodes in a given week were a single storyline in 26 of the 30 weeks that made up season 2. The four weeks that were the exception to this were during weeks 19–22 of the season, with three storylines that each crossed over into the following week; a three-parter, followed by a two-parter, followed by another three-parter.

Despite being the most prominent villain during the first season, Frank Gorshin was completely absent as The Riddler during season 2, as Gorshin was holding out for a salary increase for continuing on in the role, which the studio refused to comply with. As a result, a storyline in season 2 that was originally intended for the Riddler was instead given to a character called The Puzzler, while another storyline later on in season 2 saw John Astin replace Gorshin in the role of the Riddler.

After her absence in the 1966 film, Julie Newmar returned to the role of Catwoman in season 2, becoming the most prominent villain during the season. Although Barbara Gordon / Batgirl would not be depicted until Season 3, Barbara is discussed in the late season 2 episodes "Batman's Waterloo" and "The Duo Defy", foreshadowing her debut months later.

Mr. Freeze was portrayed by George Sanders in season 1, but Sanders was unavailable to reprise the role. As a result, Otto Preminger was cast to portray Freeze in season 2, where Freeze was going to appear in 4 episodes. Due to tensions and difficulties on set in Preminger's two-part storyline, Eli Wallach replaced Preminger in the role of Freeze for the final two-part storyline of season 2.

Episode 39 sees the first use of the "Batdrone", used to fly over Gotham City looking for an unauthorized TV broadcast location. This was at a time, during the Vietnam War, when such unmanned drone technology only existed in highly classified form.

| No. overall | No. in season | Title | Directed by | Written by | Original release date | Special Guest Villain(s) |
|---|---|---|---|---|---|---|
| 35 | 1 | "Shoot a Crooked Arrow" | Sherman Marks | Stanley Ralph Ross | September 7, 1966 | The Archer (Art Carney) |
| 36 | 2 | "Walk the Straight and Narrow" | Sherman Marks | Stanley Ralph Ross | September 8, 1966 | The Archer (Art Carney) |
The Archer arrives in Gotham City and begins robbing the rich to give to the poor, but soon changes his tactics for personal gain.
| 37 | 3 | "Hot Off the Griddle" | Don Weis | Stanley Ralph Ross | September 14, 1966 | Catwoman (Julie Newmar) |
| 38 | 4 | "The Cat and the Fiddle" | Don Weis | Stanley Ralph Ross | September 15, 1966 | Catwoman (Julie Newmar) |
The Caped Crusaders employ a newspaper columnist to snare Catwoman, not realizing the writer is actually working for her.
| 39 | 5 | "The Minstrel's Shakedown" | Murray Golden | Francis M. Cockrell & Marian B. Cockrell | September 21, 1966 | The Minstrel (Van Johnson) |
| 40 | 6 | "Barbecued Batman?" | Murray Golden | Francis M. Cockrell & Marian B. Cockrell | September 22, 1966 | The Minstrel (Van Johnson) |
A new villain called The Minstrel holds Gotham's stock market for ransom with his expertise in electronics. Phyllis Diller cameos as a scrubwoman.
| 41 | 7 | "The Spell of Tut" | Larry Peerce | Robert C. Dennis & Earl Barret | September 28, 1966 | King Tut (Victor Buono) |
| 42 | 8 | "Tut's Case is Shut" | Larry Peerce | Robert C. Dennis & Earl Barret | September 29, 1966 | King Tut (Victor Buono) |
King Tut plans to put the whole of Gotham City under his power with an ancient chemical.
| 43 | 9 | "The Greatest Mother of Them All" | Oscar Rudolph | Henry Slesar | October 5, 1966 | Ma Parker (Shelley Winters); Catwoman (Julie Newmar) (cameo in part 2) |
| 44 | 10 | "Ma Parker" | Oscar Rudolph | Henry Slesar | October 6, 1966 | Ma Parker (Shelley Winters); Catwoman (Julie Newmar) (cameo in part 2) |
The infamous Ma Parker arrives in Gotham City and plans to take over the city penitentiary.
| 45 | 11 | "The Clock King's Crazy Crimes" | James Neilson | Bill Finger & Charles Sinclair | October 12, 1966 | Clock King (Walter Slezak) |
| 46 | 12 | "The Clock King Gets Crowned" | James Neilson | Bill Finger & Charles Sinclair | October 13, 1966 | Clock King (Walter Slezak) |
Clock King uses various mechanical clock parts to try to kill Batman and Robin, and steal a fortune.
| 47 | 13 | "An Egg Grows in Gotham" | George Waggner | T : Stanley Ralph Ross; S : Edwin Self | October 19, 1966 | Egghead (Vincent Price) |
| 48 | 14 | "The Yegg Foes in Gotham" | George Waggner | T : Stanley Ralph Ross; S : Edwin Self | October 20, 1966 | Egghead (Vincent Price) |
Egghead, the smartest villain in the world, disrupts a long-standing lease to take over Gotham City and almost figures out Batman's true identity.
| 49 | 15 | "The Devil's Fingers" | Larry Peerce | Lorenzo Semple Jr. | October 26, 1966 | Chandell & Harry (Liberace) |
| 50 | 16 | "The Dead Ringers" | Larry Peerce | Lorenzo Semple Jr. | October 27, 1966 | Chandell & Harry (Liberace) |
While the Dynamic Duo are temporarily away, the musician Chandell plans to marry Harriet Cooper as part of his scheme to steal the Wayne fortune to pay off a debt, owed to his criminal twin brother, Harry.
| 51 | 17 | "Hizzonner the Penguin" | Oscar Rudolph | Stanford Sherman | November 2, 1966 | The Penguin (Burgess Meredith) |
| 52 | 18 | "Dizzoner the Penguin" | Oscar Rudolph | Stanford Sherman | November 3, 1966 | The Penguin (Burgess Meredith) |
Penguin and Batman square off in the Gotham City mayoral election. Batman dryly discusses the issues, while Penguin runs a campaign based on hoopla and thuggery.
| 53 | 19 | "Green Ice" | George Waggner | Max Hodge | November 9, 1966 | Mr. Freeze (Otto Preminger) |
| 54 | 20 | "Deep Freeze" | George Waggner | Max Hodge | November 10, 1966 | Mr. Freeze (Otto Preminger) |
After kidnapping Miss Iceland, whom he wants to forcibly marry, Mr. Freeze tries to thwart Batman and Robin by sullying their public image.
| 55 | 21 | "The Impractical Joker" | James B. Clark | Jay Thompson & Charles Hoffman | November 16, 1966 | The Joker (Cesar Romero) |
| 56 | 22 | "The Joker's Provokers" | James B. Clark | Jay Thompson & Charles Hoffman | November 17, 1966 | The Joker (Cesar Romero) |
Joker engages in a key-themed crime spree, which includes his plans to outwit Batman and Robin.
| 57 | 23 | "Marsha, Queen of Diamonds" | James B. Clark | Stanford Sherman | November 23, 1966 | Marsha, Queen of Diamonds (Carolyn Jones) |
| 58 | 24 | "Marsha's Scheme of Diamonds" | James B. Clark | Stanford Sherman | November 24, 1966 | Marsha, Queen of Diamonds (Carolyn Jones) |
Marsha tries to romance Batman in order to get her hands on a large industrial diamond he uses in the Batcave.
| 59 | 25 | "Come Back, Shame" | Oscar Rudolph | Stanley Ralph Ross | November 30, 1966 | Shame (Cliff Robertson) |
| 60 | 26 | "It's How You Play the Game" | Oscar Rudolph | Stanley Ralph Ross | December 1, 1966 | Shame (Cliff Robertson) |
Shame plans to build a powerful truck engine to help him outwit the Batmobile.
| 61 | 27 | "The Penguin's Nest" | Murray Golden | Lorenzo Semple Jr. | December 7, 1966 | The Penguin (Burgess Meredith) |
| 62 | 28 | "The Bird's Last Jest" | Murray Golden | Lorenzo Semple Jr. | December 8, 1966 | The Penguin (Burgess Meredith) |
Batman becomes suspicious when Penguin wants to be arrested.
| 63 | 29 | "The Cat's Meow" | James B. Clark | Stanley Ralph Ross | December 14, 1966 | Catwoman (Julie Newmar) |
| 64 | 30 | "The Bat's Kow Tow" | James B. Clark | Stanley Ralph Ross | December 15, 1966 | Catwoman (Julie Newmar) |
Catwoman gets her claws on a device capable of stealing people's voices and uses this to steal the voices of English singing duo Chad & Jeremy to hold their country for ransom.
| 65 | 31 | "The Puzzles Are Coming" | Jeffrey Hayden | Fred De Gorter | December 21, 1966 | The Puzzler (Maurice Evans) |
| 66 | 32 | "The Duo is Slumming" | Jeffrey Hayden | Fred De Gorter | December 22, 1966 | The Puzzler (Maurice Evans) |
The Puzzler plans to steal a new jet plane and confound Batman and Robin with his aviatic and Shakespearean themed puzzles.
| 67 | 33 | "The Sandman Cometh" | George Waggner | T : Charles Hoffman; S/T : Ellis St. Joseph | December 28, 1966 | The Sandman (Michael Rennie) & Catwoman (Julie Newmar) |
| 68 | 34 | "The Catwoman Goeth" | George Waggner | T : Charles Hoffman; S/T : Ellis St. Joseph | December 29, 1966 | The Sandman (Michael Rennie) & Catwoman (Julie Newmar) |
Catwoman teams up with the continental crook Sandman to steal a fortune and finally eliminate the Dynamic Duo.
| 69 | 35 | "The Contaminated Cowl" | Oscar Rudolph | Charles Hoffman | January 4, 1967 | The Mad Hatter (David Wayne) |
| 70 | 36 | "The Mad Hatter Runs Afoul" | Oscar Rudolph | Charles Hoffman | January 5, 1967 | The Mad Hatter (David Wayne) |
The Mad Hatter plans to finally get his hands on Batman's cowl and apparently kills the Dynamic Duo in the attempt.
| 71 | 37 | "The Zodiac Crimes" | Oscar Rudolph | T : Stanford Sherman; S/T : Stephen Kandel | January 11, 1967 | The Joker (Cesar Romero) & The Penguin (Burgess Meredith) (The Penguin in parts 1 and 3 only) |
| 72 | 38 | "The Joker's Hard Times" | Oscar Rudolph | T : Stanford Sherman; S/T : Stephen Kandel | January 12, 1967 | The Joker (Cesar Romero) & The Penguin (Burgess Meredith) (The Penguin in parts 1 and 3 only) |
| 73 | 39 | "The Penguin Declines" | Oscar Rudolph | T : Stanford Sherman; S/T : Stephen Kandel | January 18, 1967 | The Joker (Cesar Romero) & The Penguin (Burgess Meredith) (The Penguin in parts 1 and 3 only) |
Joker and Penguin team up for a massive crime spree in Gotham City.
| 74 | 40 | "That Darn Catwoman" | Oscar Rudolph | Stanley Ralph Ross | January 19, 1967 | Catwoman (Julie Newmar) & Pussycat (Lesley Gore; not billed as Extra Special Guest Villainess) |
| 75 | 41 | "Scat! Darn Catwoman" | Oscar Rudolph | Stanley Ralph Ross | January 25, 1967 | Catwoman (Julie Newmar) & Pussycat (Lesley Gore; not billed as Extra Special Guest Villainess) |
Catwoman drugs Robin, thus inducing him to join her gang.
| 76 | 42 | "Penguin Is a Girl's Best Friend" | James B. Clark | Stanford Sherman | January 26, 1967 | The Penguin (Burgess Meredith) & Marsha, Queen of Diamonds (Carolyn Jones) |
| 77 | 43 | "Penguin Sets a Trend" | James B. Clark | Stanford Sherman | February 1, 1967 | The Penguin (Burgess Meredith) & Marsha, Queen of Diamonds (Carolyn Jones) |
| 78 | 44 | "Penguin's Disastrous End" | James B. Clark | Stanford Sherman | February 2, 1967 | The Penguin (Burgess Meredith) & Marsha, Queen of Diamonds (Carolyn Jones) |
The Penguin and Marsha team up to open a movie company as a front for a massive caper, and has Batman and Robin star as the leads.
| 79 | 45 | "Batman's Anniversary" | James B. Clark | William P. D'Angelo | February 8, 1967 | The Riddler (John Astin) |
| 80 | 46 | "A Riddling Controversy" | James B. Clark | William P. D'Angelo | February 9, 1967 | The Riddler (John Astin) |
The Riddler returns to confound Batman on his anniversary with a new caper.
| 81 | 47 | "The Joker's Last Laugh" | Oscar Rudolph | T : Lorenzo Semple Jr. S : Peter Rabe | February 15, 1967 | The Joker (Cesar Romero) |
| 82 | 48 | "The Joker's Epitaph" | Oscar Rudolph | T : Lorenzo Semple Jr. S : Peter Rabe | February 16, 1967 | The Joker (Cesar Romero) |
Joker starts a counterfeiting operation using robots and tricks Bruce Wayne into handing control of the bank over to him.
| 83 | 49 | "Catwoman Goes to College" | Robert Sparr | Stanley Ralph Ross | February 22, 1967 | Catwoman (Julie Newmar) & Freddy the Fence (Jacques Bergerac; not billed as Extra Special Guest Villain) |
| 84 | 50 | "Batman Displays His Knowledge" | Robert Sparr | Stanley Ralph Ross | February 23, 1967 | Catwoman (Julie Newmar) & Freddy the Fence (Jacques Bergerac; not billed as Extra Special Guest Villain) |
Catwoman is released from prison on good behavior and starts attending Gotham City college.
| 85 | 51 | "A Piece of the Action" | Oscar Rudolph | Charles Hoffman | March 1, 1967 | Colonel Gumm (Roger C. Carmel; not billed as Special Guest Villain) |
| 86 | 52 | "Batman's Satisfaction (Note: The billed special guest star of this story is not Roger C. Carmel (Colonel Gumm) as "Special Guest Villain", but rather Van Williams (The Green Hornet) as "Visiting Hero" and Bruce Lee (Kato) as Assistant Visiting Hero, in a crossover from their own series. The Green Hornet and Kato are suspected by the Dynamic Duo and Gotham police as being criminals, rather than crime fighters.)" | Oscar Rudolph | Charles Hoffman | March 2, 1967 | Colonel Gumm (Roger C. Carmel; not billed as Special Guest Villain) |
The Green Hornet and Kato arrive in Gotham City to stop Colonel Gumm and his counterfeit stamp operation, with Batman & Robin also appearing on the scene.
| 87 | 53 | "King Tut's Coup" | James B. Clark | T : Stanley Ralph Ross; S : Leo Townsend & Pauline Townsend | March 8, 1967 | King Tut (Victor Buono) |
| 88 | 54 | "Batman's Waterloo" | James B. Clark | T : Stanley Ralph Ross; S : Leo Townsend & Pauline Townsend | March 9, 1967 | King Tut (Victor Buono) |
King Tut kidnaps a socialite, believing her to be the reincarnation of Cleopatra, tries to drown Batman, who is locked in a sarcophagus, and makes plans to boil Robin in oil.
| 89 | 55 | "Black Widow Strikes Again" | Oscar Rudolph | Robert Mintz | March 15, 1967 | Black Widow (Miss Tallulah Bankhead) |
| 90 | 56 | "Caught in the Spider's Den" | Oscar Rudolph | Robert Mintz | March 16, 1967 | Black Widow (Miss Tallulah Bankhead) |
Black Widow begins robbing banks and mesmerizes Batman to do her bidding.
| 91 | 57 | "Pop Goes the Joker" | George Waggner | Stanford Sherman | March 22, 1967 | The Joker (Cesar Romero) |
| 92 | 58 | "Flop Goes the Joker" | George Waggner | Stanford Sherman | March 23, 1967 | The Joker (Cesar Romero) |
Joker begins an art-themed caper with a final goal of stealing a collection of paintings and nearly kills Robin in the attempt.
| 93 | 59 | "Ice Spy" | Oscar Rudolph | Charles Hoffman | March 29, 1967 | Mr. Freeze (Eli Wallach) |
| 94 | 60 | "The Duo Defy" | Oscar Rudolph | Charles Hoffman | March 30, 1967 | Mr. Freeze (Eli Wallach) |
Mr. Freeze abducts a scientist to extort the formula for a freezing solution.

=== Season 3 (1967–68) ===
In Season 3, the format of the storylines were somewhat at variance with previous seasons. Season 3 aired just one episode per week, on Thursdays at 7:30 p.m. ET/PT, and true multi-part stories were the exception rather than the norm. At the conclusion of each story, the guest villains of the next story would usually make an uncredited appearance in the final scene. For example, Egghead is seen riding into town, literally, at the end of "Louie the Lilac". A notable "spin" on this idea were the "linked" episodes "Ring Around the Riddler" and "The Wail of the Siren". In "Ring Around the Riddler", The Siren has an "introductory" scene assisting The Riddler in his criminal caper and briefly mentioning having her own plans for Commissioner Gordon. Batman subsequently defeats the Riddler, and the Siren returns in the tag to start her own caper, which is the basis of "The Wail of the Siren", really a separate story altogether.

Major cast changes during Season 3 included Yvonne Craig joining as Batgirl, Frank Gorshin returning as The Riddler as a one-episode storyline meant that Gorshin's salary demands could now be met, and Eartha Kitt replacing Julie Newmar as Catwoman, as Newmar was working on the film Mackenna's Gold. Meanwhile, Madge Blake's ill health reduced her role as Aunt Harriet Cooper to just two cameo appearances during Season 3; her appearances are indicated in the episode grid below.

| No. overall | No. in season | Title | Directed by | Written by | Original release date | Special Guest Villain(s) |
|---|---|---|---|---|---|---|
| 95 | 1 | "Enter Batgirl, Exit Penguin" | Oscar Rudolph | Stanford Sherman | September 14, 1967 | The Penguin (Burgess Meredith) |
Penguin kidnaps Barbara Gordon and tries to force her to marry him.
| 96 | 2 | "Ring Around the Riddler" | Sam Strangis | Charles Hoffman | September 21, 1967 | The Riddler (Frank Gorshin); The Siren (Joan Collins; not billed as Extra Special Guest Villainess) |
The Riddler challenges Batman to a fight in the ring. Note: This was Madge Blake's first of two appearances in the third season.
| 97 | 3 | "The Wail of the Siren" | George Waggner | Stanley Ralph Ross | September 28, 1967 | The Siren (Joan Collins) |
The Siren uses her hypnotic powers to take control of both Commissioner Gordon and Bruce Wayne.
| 98 | 4 | "The Sport of Penguins" | Sam Strangis | Charles Hoffman | October 5, 1967 | The Penguin (Burgess Meredith); Lola Lasagne (Ethel Merman) |
| 99 | 5 | "A Horse of Another Color" | Sam Strangis | Charles Hoffman | October 12, 1967 | The Penguin (Burgess Meredith); Lola Lasagne (Ethel Merman) |
Penguin and Lola Lasagne team up to pull off a horse racing scam.
| 100 | 6 | "The Unkindest Tut of All" | Sam Strangis | Stanley Ralph Ross | October 19, 1967 | King Tut (Victor Buono) |
King Tut begins making televised predictions and tries to prove that Bruce Wayne is Batman.
| 101 | 7 | "Louie, the Lilac" | George Waggner | Dwight Taylor | October 26, 1967 | Louie the Lilac (Milton Berle) |
Louie the Lilac terrorizes Gotham City's flower community.
| 102 | 8 | "The Ogg and I" | Oscar Rudolph | Stanford Sherman | November 2, 1967 | Egghead (Vincent Price); Olga, Queen of the Cossacks (Anne Baxter) |
| 103 | 9 | "How to Hatch a Dinosaur" | Oscar Rudolph | Stanford Sherman | November 9, 1967 | Egghead (Vincent Price); Olga, Queen of the Cossacks (Anne Baxter) |
Egghead teams up with a group of Cossacks, kidnaps Commissioner Gordon and plans to hatch an ancient dinosaur egg.
| 104 | 10 | "Surf's Up! Joker's Under!" | Oscar Rudolph | Charles Hoffman | November 16, 1967 | The Joker (Cesar Romero) |
Joker challenges Batman to a battle on the waves.
| 105 | 11 | "The Londinium Larcenies" | Oscar Rudolph | T : Charles Hoffman; S/T : Elkan Allan | November 23, 1967 | Lord Marmaduke Ffogg (Rudy Vallée); Lady Penelope Peasoup (Glynis Johns) |
| 106 | 12 | "The Foggiest Notion" | Oscar Rudolph | T : Charles Hoffman; S/T : Elkan Allan | November 30, 1967 | Lord Marmaduke Ffogg (Rudy Vallée); Lady Penelope Peasoup (Glynis Johns) |
| 107 | 13 | "The Bloody Tower" | Oscar Rudolph | T : Charles Hoffman; S/T : Elkan Allan | December 7, 1967 | Lord Marmaduke Ffogg (Rudy Vallée); Lady Penelope Peasoup (Glynis Johns) |
The Terrific Trio head out to Londinium to battle a gang of criminal aristocrats. Note: Madge Blake made her final series appearance in "The Bloody Tower".
| 108 | 14 | "Catwoman's Dressed to Kill" | Sam Strangis | Stanley Ralph Ross | December 14, 1967 | Catwoman (Eartha Kitt) |
Catwoman plans to conquer Gotham's fashion market.
| 109 | 15 | "The Ogg Couple" | Oscar Rudolph | Stanford Sherman | December 21, 1967 | Egghead (Vincent Price); Olga, Queen of the Cossacks (Anne Baxter) |
Egghead and Olga return to cause more mayhem.
| 110 | 16 | "The Funny Feline Felonies" | Oscar Rudolph | Stanley Ralph Ross | December 28, 1967 | The Joker (Cesar Romero); Catwoman (Eartha Kitt) |
| 111 | 17 | "The Joke's on Catwoman" | Oscar Rudolph | Stanley Ralph Ross | January 4, 1968 | The Joker (Cesar Romero); Catwoman (Eartha Kitt) |
After being released for good behaviour, Joker is apparently abducted by Catwoman, but this is only a ruse as part of the felonious pair's plan to locate a hidden supply of gunpowder.
| 112 | 18 | "Louie's Lethal Lilac Time" | Sam Strangis | Charles Hoffman | January 11, 1968 | Louie the Lilac (Milton Berle) |
Louie the Lilac abducts Bruce and Dick as part of a new scheme against Gotham.
| 113 | 19 | "Nora Clavicle and the Ladies' Crime Club" | Oscar Rudolph | Stanford Sherman | January 18, 1968 | Nora Clavicle (Barbara Rush) |
Nora Clavicle has Commissioner Gordon and Mayor Linseed fired, then takes over Gotham City, and employs a female-centric government.
| 114 | 20 | "Penguin's Clean Sweep" | Oscar Rudolph | Stanford Sherman | January 25, 1968 | The Penguin (Burgess Meredith) |
Penguin tricks the people of Gotham City into discarding their currency.
| 115 | 21 | "The Great Escape" | Oscar Rudolph | Stanley Ralph Ross | February 1, 1968 | Shame (Cliff Robertson); Calamity Jan (Dina Merrill) |
| 116 | 22 | "The Great Train Robbery" | Oscar Rudolph | Stanley Ralph Ross | February 8, 1968 | Shame (Cliff Robertson); Calamity Jan (Dina Merrill) |
Shame escapes from jail and starts a new campaign of wily hijinks.
| 117 | 23 | "I'll Be a Mummy's Uncle" | Sam Strangis | Stanley Ralph Ross | February 22, 1968 | King Tut (Victor Buono) |
King Tut plans to hunt for a mine and accidentally uncovers the Batcave under Wayne Manor.
| 118 | 24 | "The Joker's Flying Saucer" | Sam Strangis | Charles Hoffman | February 29, 1968 | The Joker (Cesar Romero); Verdigris (Richard Bakalyan; not billed as Extra Special Guest Villain) |
Joker tricks the people of Gotham into thinking they're being invaded by aliens.
| 119 | 25 | "The Entrancing Dr. Cassandra" | Sam Strangis | Stanley Ralph Ross | March 7, 1968 | Dr. Cassandra Spellcraft (Ida Lupino); Cabala (Howard Duff); With cameos by Catwoman; Egghead; King Tut; The Joker; The Penguin and The Riddler (all uncredited stand-ins) |
Dr. Cassandra discovers a way of becoming invisible and helps free Gotham's criminals to rally against the Terrific Trio.
| 120 | 26 | "Minerva, Mayhem and Millionaires" | Oscar Rudolph | Charles Hoffman | March 14, 1968 | Minerva (Zsa Zsa Gabor); Freddy the Fence (Jacques Bergerac; not billed as Extra Special Guest Villain) |
Minerva opens a spa for Gotham's millionaires and tricks them into parting with their cash.

== See also ==
- Batman (TV series)
- Batman (1966 film)
- Return to the Batcave: The Misadventures of Adam and Burt
- Batman: Return of the Caped Crusaders
- Batman vs. Two-Face
