= Londinium (disambiguation) =

Londinium was the name of London, England during the Roman period.

Londinium may also refer to:

- Londinium (film), a 2001 romantic comedy film
- Londinium (album), by the band Archive, or the title song
- "Londinium" (Catatonia song), 1999
- Londinium (Batman), a location in the 1960s television series
- Londinium, a fictional planet in the TV show Firefly
