= Enter Batgirl, Exit Penguin =

- Batman episode
- Episode no.: Season 3 Episode 1
- Directed by: Oscar Rudolph
- Written by: Stanford Sherman
- Original air date: September 14, 1967

Guest appearances
- John Waltier; Jonathan Troy; Elizabeth Harrower; Special Guest Villain: Burgess Meredith as The Penguin; Uncredited: Frank Gorshin as The Riddler

Episode chronology
← Previous "The Duo Defy"	Next → "Ring Around the Riddler"

"Enter Batgirl, Exit Penguin" is the first episode of Season 3 of the Batman television series, first aired on ABC September 14, 1967 as its ninety-fifth episode. It guest starred Burgess Meredith as The Penguin, and also was the first appearance of Yvonne Craig as Police Commissioner Gordon's daughter, Barbara Gordon, a.k.a. Batgirl.

== Plot synopsis ==
After dispatching Catwoman in an unseen battle, Batman and Robin return to the Batcave to revert to their mild-mannered roles of Bruce Wayne and Dick Grayson, in preparation of attending an opera this evening. As a planned surprise, Commissioner Gordon arranges a date between his pretty daughter, Barbara Gordon, with Bruce Wayne. While arriving at her midtown apartment, after work from the Gotham City Library, Barbara is kidnapped by the Penguin while she is in the lift by being hooked up by his umbrellas. The Penguin binds her to a chair, gags her, and hides her in the apartment next to hers, which is being redecorated. Commissioner Gordon, Chief O'Hara, Bruce and Dick all arrive at Barbara's apartment a few hours later, only to realize that Barbara is missing. As they try to find out what happened to Barbara, Penguin calls Barbara's line and speaks to Commissioner Gordon about the kidnapping. Bruce tells Penguin that he will pay any price as ransom, however Penguin's demands are not about money but marriage instead; his marriage to Barbara. As proof of the Penguin's intentions to marry Barbara, he puts a marriage announcement in the Gotham Times. Wayne tells Commissioner Gordon the reason for the Penguin's marriage is to gain immunity from prosecution because he would be the son-in-law of the police commissioner. Penguin ungags Barbara and when she refuses his offer, he threatens to kill the commissioner if Barbara does not marry him, demonstrating this by having his henchmen fire at a cut-out of the Commissioner. Barbara reluctantly agrees to marry him.

Bruce and Dick immediately change into Batman and Robin and head back to Police Headquarters. Meanwhile, two of Penguin's henchmen interrupt a meeting between Alfred and his minister, needing a clergyman to marry the Penguin and Barbara, and kidnap Alfred, believing him to be the minister after he says he is to protect the real minister. Alfred uses a distress tracking signal, however, to alert Batman. As Alfred is dumped into a room where Barbara is held, Barbara escapes through a window, warning Alfred not to reveal her true identity. Barbara heads back to her apartment where she changes into Batgirl, through a hidden room behind her bedroom. Batman and Robin follow Alfred into the Penguin's hideout, where they meet Batgirl who helps them defeat the thugs. But after she leaves Penguin gasses them with his umbrella, then places them (and Alfred) in purple bags, and throws them onto a truck below with a bag he thinks contains Barbara. He takes them to a different location. The Penguin ties Batman and Robin up in the bags and hangs them above a vat of hot acid.

However, Batgirl follows the group on her Batgirlcycle and crashes the Penguin's party. Alfred frees Batman and Robin from the deathtrap, and they join Batgirl in defeating the Penguin and all five of his henchmen. Batgirl is angry at Alfred, claiming he faked being a Minister, but when he reveals why he did so she apologises. She tells Alfred not to reveal to anyone, not even Batman and Robin, that she is Barbara Gordon; he initially seems reluctant but then promises. Batgirl then disappears before Batman and Robin finally bag the Penguin and his henchmen. They open a bag and find Barbara inside. Alfred tells them Batgirl left a few minutes ago & The Dynamic Duo didn't expect the last of Batgirl, ending up questioning "Who is this Batgirl?".

Afterwards Bruce provides Dick with a new car. The car, a 1968 Plymouth Barracuda Convertible with the name plate removed on the side, is what Bruce gives to Dick as a present for passing the road test and obtaining a driver's license. Meanwhile, Commissioner Gordon and Chief O'Hara receive a threatening call from the Riddler, the villain appearing in next week's episode. The episode concludes with Dick driving Bruce in his new car back to Wayne Manor, with Bruce reminding him, "Remember, this is not the Batmobile".

== Notes ==
- In this episode, Barbara Gordon has recently returned from four years of college, and Dick Grayson gets his driver's license on his birthday and can now drive the Batmobile.
- Producer Howie Horwitz made a 7-minute film, which was never aired, introducing the Batgirl character, with aid from The Dynamic Duo in confronting the villain, the Killer Moth, to convince ABC that the addition of the new character would help the ratings. The network liked it and decided to give the Batman TV series a chance at a third season.
- This season, all of the action word titles which appeared during the climactic fight sequences were still inserted in between scenes, with an added twist: they now flashed. This is a symptom of the financial difficulties experienced by the studio, as this new style was to remove the need for expensive rotoscoping.
- The showcasing of next week's villains at show's end attempted to bridge the gap between the episodes, now that the show was seen once a week.
- The Batgirlcycle was reconstructed out of a Yamaha YDS-5E. In the presentation reel, Batgirl rode a black, less feminine cycle.
- Batgirl (Barbara Gordon) was not the first heroine in the Bat-comics. Batwoman (Kathy Kane) made her debut in Detective Comics #233 in July 1956. In April 1961 DC Comics introduced Batwoman's niece Betty Kane (who had a thing for Dick Grayson until 1983) a.k.a. Bat-Girl in Batman #139. Both Batwoman and Bat-Girl were gone in 1964, but were back in 1977 as guest stars in the comic book spin-off Batman Family starring Robin and Batgirl, which debuted in 1975 and ended in 1978. Kathy Kane/Batwoman was killed by the League of Assassins in Detective Comics #485 (August 1979).
- A popular myth among fandom is that the "Barbara Gordon" version of Batgirl was specifically created for the series by producer William Dozier. However, the closing credits make it quite clear Batgirl is owned by and licensed from DC Comics. Comic editor Julius Schwartz had asked writer Gardner Fox to create a recurring female character for the comic book to attract some of the female demographic of the TV series. Dozier saw early artwork of her first story while visiting DC Comics offices, and collaborated to introduce her into the TV show. She was first put into the comic, and then later introduced on the TV series. Also, Aunt Harriet remained a semi-regular character in the comics until she was phased out in the mid-1970s.
- The comic book story in which Batgirl made her debut was not that far off from the promotional film. In the comic book, Barbara was on her way to a masquerade party dressed as a female version of her favorite hero, Batman. On her way to the party she saw Killer Moth (the same villain in the Batgirl promo film) and his henchmen attempt to kidnap Bruce Wayne. Barbara then jumped into action and saved Bruce. Thrilled by the excitement, Barbara then decides to start off her own career as a female crimefighter.

Preceded by The Duo Defy (airdate March 30, 1967)	Batman (TV series) episodes September 7, 1966	Succeeded by Ring Around the Riddler (airdate September 21, 1967)
