= Marsha's Scheme of Diamonds =

- Batman episode
- Episode no.: Season 2 Episode 24
- Directed by: James B. Clark
- Written by: Stanford Sherman
- Production code: 9727-Pt. 2
- Original air date: November 24, 1966

Guest appearances
- Woody Strode; Estelle Winwood; James O'Hara; Ben Gauge; Hugh Douglas; Charles Stewart; Special Guest Villainess: Carolyn Jones as Marsha, Queen of Diamonds

Episode chronology
← Previous "Marsha, Queen of Diamonds"	Next → "Come Back, Shame"

"Marsha's Scheme of Diamonds" is the 58th episode of the Batman television series. It originally aired on ABC, on November 24, 1966 and guest starred Carolyn Jones as Marsha, Queen of Diamonds.

== Plot synopsis ==
In the previous episode, as Batman is about to be forced into marrying Marsha, Queen of Diamonds, Aunt Harriet Cooper and Alfred Pennyworth, posing as "Mrs. Batman" and her "lawyer", respectively, storm up to the altar. Alfred provides a fake marriage certificate to the minister conducting the wedding, showing that Batman is still married. The minister refuses to go on with the wedding.

A furious Marsha runs back to her lair, where she is about to give another potion to Robin, but Batman arrives. Marsha and her goons escape before Batman and Alfred enter. Batman and Alfred revive Robin, Commissioner Gordon and Chief O’Hara. Marsha returns to see Aunt Hilda about the failure of Hilda's latest potion. Hilda knew the potion was of poor quality anyway, so they try to figure out a workable potion for the Dynamic Duo.

Meanwhile, Robin wakes up in the Batcave, telling Batman that their troubles with Marsha all center around their Bat-Diamond. Since the Bat-Diamond would be too large and heavy for Marsha to steal from the Batcave, the Dynamic Duo obtains some information via the Batcomputer about Marsha’s bordello. Commissioner Gordon calls Batman, remembering Marsha saying to him that she has to visit her aunt, while Batman suspects that there may be a basement where Marsha and Aunt Hilda are hiding. Using the Bat-Computer, Batman and Robin locate Marsha’s basement and then pay a visit to the Queen and Hilda. A fight with Marsha's men ensues. Marsha throws a smoke bomb, rendering Batman and Robin unconscious, then Hilda turns Batman and Robin into toads before delivering them to Commissioner Gordon’s office. Marsha threatens to feed Batman and Robin to a hungry cat unless Commissioner Gordon reveals the Batcave and Bat-Diamond’s location. Then Batman and Robin reappear through a window, shocking Marsha and Gordon. The toads were substituted while Marsha was away. The voices from the toads were provided by Batman's ventriloquism. Marsha is placed under arrest.

Preceded by Marsha, Queen of Diamonds (airdate November 23, 1966)	Batman (TV series) episodes September 7, 1966	Succeeded by Come Back, Shame (airdate November 30, 1966)
