= The Zodiac Crimes =

- Batman episodes
- Episode nos.: Season 2 Episodes 37-39
- Directed by: Oscar Rudolph
- Written by: Teleplay by Stephen Kandel and Stanford Sherman, based on a story by Stephen Kandel
- Production codes: 9733-Pt. 1, 2, and 3
- Original air dates: January 11, 1967; January 12, 1967; January 18, 1967

Guest appearances
- Special Guest Villain: Cesar Romero as The Joker; Extra Special Guest Villain: Burgess Meredith as The Penguin (eps. 1, 3); Charles Picerni; Milton Stark; Terry Moore; Hal Baylor; Joe Di Reda; Eddie Saenz; Dick Crockett; Charles Fredericks; Howard Wendell; Louis Cordova; Vincent Barbi; Jonathan Kidd; Rob Reiner (uncredited, ep. 3)

Episode chronology
← Previous "The Mad Hatter Runs Afoul"	Next → "That Darn Catwoman"

The television series Batman aired a three-part series of episodes in 1967 during its second season: "The Zodiac Crimes", "The Joker's Hard Times", and "The Penguin Declines". These were the 71st, 72nd, and 73rd episodes of the show. It first aired on ABC on January 11, 1967, with the second and third episodes on January 12 and January 18. They would be repeated on June 14, 15, and 21 the same year. The series was dubbed a "Batman special" as the show generally used two-episode stories with a cliffhanger in the middle, but occasionally did three-episode stories such as this one. The episodes aired around the show's first anniversary. Due to the unusual scheduling, William Dozier (as narrator) urges watchers to tune in "next week" rather than "tomorrow" for the cliffhanger at the end of the second episode.

The episodes feature a team-up between both Cesar Romero as The Joker and Burgess Meredith as Penguin (dubbed as an "Extra Special Guest Villain"), with The Joker bent on committing a series of 12 crimes fashioned after the Zodiac.

== Plot ==
=== "The Zodiac Crimes" ===
The Joker pays a visit to Commissioner James Gordon's office at Police HQ and swipes a rare art map. Alerted, Batman and Robin deduce that he is plotting to commit twelve crimes based loosely on astrological signs of the zodiac and that he committed the first Zodiac Crime already by stealing the rare art map, whose initials stand for the sign of the Ram (Aries). Meanwhile, back at his hideout Joker clues the recently arrived (rather, packaged and shipped) Penguin into his astrological plan. He then gives a false clue to Batman and Robin to the effect that "Taurus the Bull is next on my show", and "You'll be singing a song of woe!" Batman and Robin deduce that Joker was telling them a lot of bull, believing that Joker's true objective involves kidnapping a famous brother-and-sister singing duo named the Twins (Gemini), who sing a song of woe, and they rush to their aid. Unknown to them, the singing duet have already been replaced by Joker's aides, while the Penguin is waiting in the wings to ensnare Batman and Robin.

Arriving at the studio, Batman and Robin are led outside, where Penguin escapes on Joker's Boom Bug. The Dynamic Duo chase the bizarre truck, but lose The Penguin, who cleverly lifts himself off with the aid of his umbrella and an overhead wire. While Batman and Robin are led astray, The Joker and his shapely henchwoman, Venus, make off with the true twins: the famous twin diamonds. Returning to the Batcave, The Caped Crusader learns the location of The Joker's hideout by analyzing the long wig left behind by Venus at the studio when she masqueraded as one of the Twins. Arriving at the hideout, Batman and Robin find the place deserted save for Venus, who falls for Batman and agrees to help him and Robin snare The Joker. She leads the Dynamic Duo to the opera house, where Joker and Penguin, plan to commit two Zodiac Crimes: the kidnapping of Leo Crustash (Leo the Lion and Crustacean the Crab). A fight ensues, but Joker and his minions escape with Crustash, abandoning Penguin to the fate of the authorities.

Figuring that The Joker is scheming to pilfer a masterpiece entitled "Virgin Bereaved" (Virgo the Virgin), Batman and Robin dash to the Gotham City Museum and find Joker with only his henchman Uranus - or so they think. The duo's odds quickly go from 2-on-2 to 7-on-2 as the artwork around them reveals themselves to be the other henchmen. After the fight is over, Joker orders the final statue, "Venus Unobserved", to put them under with a sleeping powder. Venus watches in horror and regret as Joker then has the Duo tied down to an altar beneath a giant meteorite, which is rigged to fall on them when its supporting cable is severed by a revolving piece of thermite attached to a planetary mobile surrounding the great rock.

=== "The Joker's Hard Times" ===
With Batman and Robin bound underneath a giant meteorite boulder, soon to drop upon them when released by a burning thermite fuse, Batman frees one of his hands, takes a Batarang from his utility belt, and tosses it at the burning thermite. Breaking off a piece, Batman frees himself, pulls out a Batknife and cuts Robin loose, and they escape with seconds to spare before the great stone drops. Joker, believing the duo are finished, continues his "Zodiac Crime" spree, snatching a statue of Justice (Libra), worth a fortune in Carrara marble, from outside Police HQ, just as Venus, incognito as a trench coat detective, plucks a jeweled scorpion (Scorpio). The Dynamic Duo arrive at Police HQ in time to chase down Joker, who disguises himself as a police officer and retreats in a stolen police car. He then leads the police and the Dynamic Duo on a merry chase all over Gotham City by broadcasting bogus instructions on the police citizens band radio, until Batman foils this plan.

Unable to catch him, the Duo set a trap for Joker and his crew at the home of Basil Bowman (Sagittarius). When Joker arrives and finds Batman and Robin, he grabs Venus and, with a knife at her throat, makes his escape using her as his shield. Finally realizing Joker isn't to be trusted, Venus defects to The Dynamic Duo's side. She leads the duo to the Platter-Porium record shop and there, following a fierce battle with Joker's thugs, they find Leo Crustash. Later, not only does Joker snatch two rare palaremus demnese fish (Pisces) that were on exhibit at the Gotham City Park Fountain, but one of his men kidnaps Venus as well, not long after the Dynamic Duo speed off in a hot pursuit.

En route to their hideout at the warehouse, the Joker's henchmen start shooting at the bullet-proof Batmobile as the Dynamic Duo give chase, forcing them to take a detour. Back at his lair, the Joker catches Batman and Robin in a huge net and quickly takes them to a water-filled tank, where, along with Venus, they are in due course to become the main course for a giant clam. The Joker and his henchmen depart to commit their next crime, while the clam proceeds to swallow Robin.

=== "The Penguin Declines" ===
Batman and Joker's former henchwoman Venus are chained in a water pit where a giant clam has (almost) already swallowed Robin. Using every ounce of his strength, Batman bursts free of his chains, rushes over to the clam and pries it open long enough to rescue Robin from the maw of the mollusk. Freeing Venus, the trio make their escape, while the Joker, needing more assistance with his remaining two Zodiac crimes, has his henchmen Uranus and Mars smuggle the Penguin out of prison in a prison laundry truck by way of "Operation: Laundry Bag". Serious dissension soon builds between the two.

Using a mixture of his own insidious creation, "Jokerjelly" (concentrated strawberry gelatin which resembles strawberry jelly, but tastes like strawberry grease), Joker and crew go to the Gotham City Reservoir, where he infuses the entire Gotham City water supply (Aquarius), and then demands $10 million to ransom it back. Meanwhile, the Penguin, claiming he has reformed, tries to win over Venus (who is staying at Bruce Wayne's midtown apartment) into asking Batman to let her visit the Batcave, so she can remove Penguin's criminal record from the Batcomputer for him.

Batman and Robin fly out to the Jokerjelly-infested Gotham City Reservoir by Batcopter and restore the water supply with the trusty aid of a "Special Exploding Batarang" and the "Portable Batlab". Returning to the city, Batman and Robin pay a visit to Venus, who, falling for Penguin's fib about going straight, she convinces Batman into taking her to the Batcave. What the Dynamic Duo does not realize: Joker and Penguin are hoping to make Batman the goat (Capricorn).

Batman and Robin return to the Batcave with Venus (having doused her with Batgas), and after a small tour, they get a surprise when the Penguin, Joker, Mercury, Mars, Jupiter, Saturn, Neptune and Uranus pop right out of the Batmobile's trunk, ready to assassinate them, and convert the Batcave into the headquarters of Gotham City's criminals. But Batman stops them by activating his newly designed "Batspectrograph Criminal Analyzer", which recorded Joker and Penguin's bone structure, metabolism rate, molecular blood structure, retina patterns, and other invaluable scientific data (he knew they were hiding in the trunk all along, and so he brought them both to the Batcave in order to utilize the analyzer which only works at close range and is too large to move). Penguin tries to kill Batman and Robin with his umbrella gun, but the "Batprobe Negative Ion Attractor", which Batman strategically installed in the Batmobile's trunk, depleted its power source during the time they were inside. After a fierce fight, the whole gang is captured and ready to be delivered to prison. Furthermore, when the Joker and Penguin threaten to reveal the location of the Batcave, which obviously would betray Batman and Robin's secret identities, Batman reminds them that they have seen only the cave's interior and not its exterior so they have no idea of its location. While the Joker and Penguin accuse each other for forgetting to look out of the trunk during the trip, Batman reveals to Robin and Venus that he locked the trunk hatch while they were inside so they never would have been able to open it in transit anyway. He then calms down the Penguin and Joker by putting them under with a whiff of Batgas.

Later at Wayne Manor, Dick Grayson cringes as he learns from Alfred that the main course for dinner is clam chowder, but Bruce Wayne assures him it is his chance to get even.

== Notes ==
- A young Rob Reiner has a small uncredited role as a delivery boy in "The Penguin Declines". He would later gain fame as Michael "Meathead" Stivic on All in the Family (CBS, 1971–79) and many other works.
- Robin notes that he and Batman (with Alfred's help) were able to foil Joker's previous plan to heist Gotham City's water supply. This is an allusion to the episode, "The Joker's Provokers", earlier in Season 2, when Joker placed a hallucinogen in the water supply during his time-altering scheme.
- "The Penguin Declines" is the first appearance of The Batcopter in the TV series; it debuted in the 1966 movie.

== Reception ==
Keith R. A. DeCandido wrote a retrospective in 2016, giving the "Zodiac" episodes a mixed review and a rating of 5/10. He thought the overall criminal scheme was good, although a Taurus or bull-themed crime was strangely missing and the Capricorn crime's link was quite weak in essentially The Joker just calling Batman a goat. He also liked that Venus reforms in the middle of the story, giving her a chance to actually help the heroes out, rather than in many other episodes where a criminal's moll only reforms at the very end. He also thought that the chemistry between Romero and Meredith was excellent when both were on-screen. However, the episodes do not actually have them working together very much, and the Penguin is only superficially worked into the plot; a missed opportunity, to DeCandido.

Preceded by The Mad Hatter Runs Afoul (airdate January 5, 1967)	Batman (TV series) episodes January 11, 12, 18, 1967	Succeeded by That Darn Catwoman (airdate January 19, 1967)
