= Marsha, Queen of Diamonds =

- Batman episode
- Episode no.: Season 2 Episode 23
- Directed by: James B. Clark
- Written by: Stanford Sherman
- Production code: 9727-Pt. 1
- Original air date: November 23, 1966

Guest appearances
- Woody Strode; Estelle Winwood; James O'Hara; Ben Gauge; Hugh Douglas; Charles Stewart; Special Guest Villainess: Carolyn Jones as Marsha, Queen of Diamonds

Episode chronology
← Previous "The Jokers Provokers"	Next → "Marsha's Scheme of Diamonds"

"Marsha, Queen of Diamonds" is the 57th episode of the Batman television series. It originally aired on ABC, on November 23, 1966 and guest starred Carolyn Jones as the episode's titular villainess.

== Plot synopsis ==
At Chief Miles O'Hara’s orders, police officers are stationed outside "U. Magnum Diamonds", in lookout for Marsha, Queen of Diamonds’ possible attack. A motorcade approaches the officers where Chief O’Hara steps out of the silver Rolls-Royce with Marsha, stunning the officers. O'Hara and Marsha enter the jewelry store, taking the Pretzel Diamond from the jewelers inside the store, while O'Hara continues to profess his undying love with Marsha. Meanwhile, Batman and Robin, along with Alfred Pennyworth, are testing a gigantic "Bat-Diamond" in the Batcave when they get the call from Commissioner Gordon about the burglary as well as O'Hara’s alleged involvement. It turns out that Marsha, Queen of Diamonds, has Miles in a birdcage, and under her magic spell, along with at least three other victims. In order to get her victims, Marsha uses Cupid, a foot tall statue that throws darts equipped with a love potion, with the darts activated by a remote controlled device. Marsha now tries to find out the whereabouts of the "Bat-Diamond", and is eager to break into the Batcave, where the diamond is stored, and find out Batman's true identity. Commissioner Gordon does not wait for Batman and Robin to arrive at Police HQ; instead he visits Marsha, asking about the whereabouts of O’Hara. Marsha activates the love dart, sending Commissioner Gordon under her spell and in captivity. Marsha visits her basement where Aunt Hilda, a witch specializing in new potions, resides; she asks Hilda about a special potion for Batman, knowing he is more resistant to ordinary potions.

Batman and Robin visit Marsha, where she activates the potion dart on Batman. Using "every ounce of willpower", Batman resists the potion and escapes Marsha's clutches. An infuriated Marsha sends her men to do battle with Batman and Robin. During the fight Marsha plants another dart on Robin. Marsha extorts Batman by holding Robin hostage in exchange for the Bat-Diamond, including a visit to the Batcave. Batman refuses Marsha’s demands, where he vows not to allow anyone else in the Batcave. But Marsha, wanting to bilk him out of all his money, gives Batman an ultimatum by giving another "vow", she proposes marriage to Batman, thus allowing her to enter the Batcave and reveal his secret identity. Should Batman refuse the marriage offer, Robin, Commissioner Gordon and Chief O’Hara would all be under her captivity, forever. Thus, in order to save them, Batman has no choice to marry Marsha.

As the marriage is being televised on Gotham City TV, Alfred and Aunt Harriet ponder what to do about the impending marriage. The final scene shows the wedding ceremony between Marsha and Batman, where Marsha says "I do" but Batman is holding out whether he will say "I do" (and have the location of the Batcave and his true identity revealed), or say "I object", and lose his only adoptive son, Robin, for the rest of his life.

== Trap ==
The trap in this episode is Batman deciding whether or not to say I do. If he does say it he'll be married to Marsha and give away the location of the Batcave, though if he says no he'll risk losing Chief O'Hara, Robin, and Commissioner Gordon forever as they'll stay in Marsha's clutches as she'll not have the Bat Diamond.

== Notes ==
- Zsa Zsa Gabor was originally going to play Marsha but was replaced by Carolyn Jones. Gabor eventually went on to portray the final villainess on the series, Minerva, in 1968.
- Veteran actress Estelle Winwood played Marsha's Aunt Hilda, a role she repeated in the other Batman episodes featuring Marsha.
- This is the first appearance of Carolyn Jones as Marsha, Queen of Diamonds. She appeared in five Batman episodes.
- In this episode, it is revealed that Commissioner Gordon and Chief O'Hara are both married while Alfred had never taken the plunge.
- Carolyn Jones previously appeared in the 1953 movie House Of Wax with fellow Batman alumni Vincent Price who played Egghead. She is best remembered by TV viewers as Morticia on The Addams Family (ABC, 1964–66).
- 2 other cast members of The Addams Family also appeared on Batman, John Astin, who played Gomez, would later portray The Riddler in "Batman's Anniversary/A Riddling Controversy" and Ted Cassidy makes a window cameo as Lurch in "The Penguin's Nest".

Preceded by The Jokers Provokers (airdate November 17, 1966)	Batman (TV series) episodes September 7, 1966	Succeeded by Marsha's Scheme of Diamonds (airdate November 24, 1966)
