= Shoot a Crooked Arrow =

- Batman episode
- Episode no.: Season 2 Episode 1
- Directed by: Sherman Marks
- Written by: Stanley Ralph Ross
- Production code: 9705-Pt. 1
- Original air date: September 7, 1966

Guest appearances
- Dick Clark; Sam Jaffe; Myron Dell; Robert Cornthwaite; Robert Adler; Doodles Weaver; Barbara Nichols; Loren Ewing; Steve Pendleton; Lee Delano; Archie Moore; Special Guest Villain: Art Carney as The Archer

Episode chronology
| ← Previous "Batman Makes the Scenes" | Next → "Walk the Straight and Narrow" |

"Shoot a Crooked Arrow" is the 35th episode of the Batman television series. It was the series' second season opener on ABC, originally airing on September 7, 1966 (with a repeat taking place on May 31, 1967), as well as the first to air first-run on ABC since the release of the 1966 Batman motion picture, and guest starred Art Carney as The Archer.

== Plot ==
In Batman's first episode of the second season, The Archer, a villain modeled after Robin Hood, escapes from Police Headquarters in a moving van from the Trojan Hearse Company, driven by Maid Marilyn. Together, with his band of "merry malefactors" - Crier Tuck and Big John (a play on Friar Tuck and Little John, respectively) - he pays a surprise visit to Wayne Manor. The inhabitants are gassed and cash is stolen. Later, the crew attacks Police Headquarters. When they are giving out other stolen cash they are apprehended by Batman and Robin. The Gotham citizens enriched by the muggers save them from arrest.

Batman and Robin trace the Archer to his hideout at the Earl of Huntington Archery Range (Robin Hood was the alias of the Earl of Huntingdon) in Gotham's Green Forest section, where Alfred Pennyworth attempts to divert the antagonists long enough for Batman and Robin to inspect his lair. The two are trapped in a giant net.

The Archer threatens to behead Alfred if he does not get the location of the Batcave, so the crime computers can be destroyed. Knowing the guillotine is fake, Batman refuses and challenges Quigley to a fair duel. The Archer then sets up Batman and Robin to be skewered by lances.

== Notes ==
- Episode production numbers appear at the end of the show's end credits throughout this season.
- Dick Clark makes an appearance while Batman & Robin are climbing down the wall of a building. Batman doesn't recognize him, but says he must be from Philadelphia by his accent (although Clark was not actually from Philadelphia, it was the city where he originated his show American Bandstand on the same network ABC at the time). To make the scene funny, Robin introduces himself, but Clark mistakes them for a vocal group for their outfits, which caused them some annoyance.
- Beginning this season, all of the onomatopoeia which appear during the climactic fight sequences were inserted in between shots, as opposed to being superimposed over the footage, due to cutting down the massive budget devoted to camera and art work.
- Howie Horwitz's producing credit is now moved from the end credits to the episode sub-main title sequence.

| Preceded by Batman Makes the Scenes (airdate May 5, 1966) | Batman (TV series) episodes September 7, 1966 | Succeeded by Walk the Straight and Narrow (airdate September 8, 1966) |
