= Love in Our Time =

- Directed by: Elkan Allan
- Produced by: Tony Tenser
- Starring: Gino Melvazzi; Ann Michelle; Declan Cuffe; Bill Cummings; Joanne Harding
- Narrated by: Elkan Allan
- Music by: Reg Tilsley
- Production company: Tigon
- Distributed by: Tigon
- Release date: 1968
- Country: United Kingdom
- Language: English

Love in Our Time is a 1968 British film documentary about sex. It was directed and narrated by Elkan Allan.
