= Londinium (Batman) =

1967 three-episode series of "Batman"

- Batman episodes
- Episode nos.: Season 3 Episodes 11-13
- Directed by: Oscar Rudolph
- Written by: Teleplay by Elkan Allan and Charles Hoffman, based on a story by Elkan Allan
- Original air dates: November 23, 1967; November 30, 1967; December 7, 1967

Guest appearances
- Special Guest Villain: Rudy Vallée as Lord Marmaduke Ffogg; Extra Special Guest Villainess: Glynis Johns as Lady Penelope Peasoup

Episode chronology
← Previous "Surf's Up! Joker's Under!"	Next → "Catwoman's Dressed to Kill"

The television series Batman aired a three-part series of episodes in 1967 during its third season: "The Londinium Larcenies", "The Foggiest Notion", and "The Bloody Tower". It was the series' tribute to the Swinging London period of the late 1960s. At the time of the airing of the show, the British Invasion was underway and British culture and fashion were trendy in North America.

In these episodes, Batman, Robin, Alfred, Commissioner Gordon, Chief O'Hara, and Barbara Gordon visit "Londinium" (a stand-in for London) for an international police conference. There, the crime-fighters attempt to foil Lord Marmaduke Ffogg and his sister Lady Penelope Peasoup in their plot to steal priceless treasures with the aid of a fog-creating pipe.

Batman episodes were usually structured as two-part series with a cliffhanger in the middle, but occasionally had a three-part series. The Londinium set was the third and final of such three-episode plotlines.

== Plot ==
Marmaduke Ffogg (Rudy Vallée) and Penelope Peasoup (Glynis Johns) steal priceless snuffboxes from Chuckingham Palace, then cover their escape with Ffogg's fog-emitting pipe. The main cast leaves Gotham City for Londinium. Gordon and his daughter Barbara are attending a police conference, while Bruce Wayne, Dick Grayson, and Alfred are officially attending to Wayne Foundation business, though in reality attending due to the first minister's request for Batman to investigate. The pair take the Batmobile on the boat and set up a temporary Batcave at a country manor house that Bruce Wayne rents. Meanwhile, Ffogg steals Lady Easterland's jeweled Easter eggs.

The crew visits Ffogg's manor. They meet Ffogg, Peasoup, and Lady Prudence (Lyn Peters), Ffogg's daughter. Prudence and Peasoup operate a girls' finishing school that is actually a front for training lady criminals. After fighting Ffogg's goons, a clue in three silver bells is sent to Ireland Yard. Batman goes to the Three Bells pub, Robin is accosted and kidnapped by Prudence and her gang of female thieves, and Barbara realizes the true nature of the school. After changing into her Batgirl outfit, Barbara finds the stolen treasures at the Ffogg estate, but is captured by paralyzing gas released by Prudence. Batman is defeated in a pub brawl against Ffogg's goons; Ffogg hooks Batman up to a machine that erases his memories. Chief O'Hara also arrives in Londinium. After Alfred restores Batman's memory at the Londinium Batcave, Batman and Alfred rescue a tied-up Robin from being crushed by the Tower Bridge mechanism. Robin is seemingly captured again by a bee trap; Prudence announces to her father that Robin is dying from a bee sting, but in reality he uses an antidote from his utility belt and is spared. Ffogg throws lethal fog pellets into his dungeon to finish off the trapped Batgirl, but Batman arrives and rescues her. He then uses an Indian rope trick to escape.

Thinking their adversaries are dead, Ffogg and Peasoup head to the Tower of Londinium to steal the Crown Jewels. Batman and Robin, having dressed as beefeaters to disguise themselves, are already ready to stop them and their goons, with Batgirl's aid. Ffogg attempts to use his pipe again, but Batman has an anti-fog device handy, foiling their escape. Ffogg, Peasoup, and Prudence are arrested; Batgirl disappears followed by Barbara conveniently appearing soon afterward; and the Americans return home.

=== London references ===
The episode includes several references to real-life London locations with the name slightly changed. The city itself is named Londinium, the name from the Roman period of London. Other references include "Chuckingham Palace" (Buckingham Palace), the venerable "Ireland Yard" (New Scotland Yard), the Queen's Highway, the Tower of Londinium (Tower of London), "Barnaby Street" (Carnaby Street), the Londinium House (possibly Grosvenor House Hotel), and the Tower Bridge.

== Reception ==
Keith R. A. DeCandido wrote a hostile retrospective in 2017, giving the Londinium episodes a rating of 1/10. He thought that Rudy Vallée gave a "dreadful" and uninteresting performance as Ffogg; it also wasted the episode's premise in that Vallée was an American who did not perform in a good English accent. He thought that British actress Glynis Johns acquitted herself far better as Peasoup. The sets also did not play into the episode's premise; DeCandido thought they were "obvious Southern California locations" that did not actually utilize or sell the fun of episodes set in London. The series features a plotline where Prudence is seemingly playing both sides, but it goes nowhere. Finally, while the campy humor of Batman gives something of a pass for unrealistic situations, DeCandido felt that even given that, the plot of the episodes made no sense.

== See also ==
- List of places in London
