= Barbara Gordon =

DC Comics character

- Batgirl and Oracle—the definitive iterations of the character. Art by Fernando Pasarin (pencils), Matt Ryan (inks), and Hi-Fi Designs (colors), taken from Oracle: Origins & Omens #1 (2011)

Publication information
- Publisher: DC Comics
- First appearance: As Batgirl: Detective Comics #359 (January 1967); As Oracle: Suicide Squad #23 (January 1989)
- Created by: As Batgirl: William Dozier (idea); Julius Schwartz (concept); Gardner Fox (writer); Carmine Infantino (artist); As Oracle: John Ostrander (writer); Kim Yale (writer)

In-story information
- Alter ego: Barbara Joan Gordon
- Species: Human
- Team affiliations: Justice League; Birds of Prey; Batman Family; Suicide Squad; Batman Incorporated
- Partnerships: Batman; Nightwing; Robin; Batgirl/Orphan; Batgirl/Spoiler; Batgirl/Misfit; Huntress; Black Canary; Lady Blackhawk; Manhunter; Supergirl
- Notable aliases: Batgirl; Amy Beddoes; Oracle
- Abilities: Genius-level intellect; Trained computer scientist and security hacker; Highly skilled martial artist and hand-to-hand combatant; Utilizes high-tech equipment and weaponry; Expert detective; Indomitable will; Eidetic memory

Barbara Joan Gordon is a superheroine appearing in American comic books published by DC Comics, commonly in association with the superhero Batman. The character was created by television producer William Dozier, editor Julius Schwartz, writer Gardner Fox, and artist Carmine Infantino. Dozier, the producer of the 1960s Batman television series, requested Schwartz to call for a new female counterpart to the superhero Batman that could be introduced into publication and the third season of the show simultaneously. The character subsequently made her first comic-book appearance as Batgirl in Detective Comics #359, titled "The Million Dollar Debut of Batgirl!" in January 1967, by Fox and Infantino, allowing her to be introduced into the television series, portrayed by actress Yvonne Craig, in the season 3 premiere "Enter Batgirl, Exit Penguin", in September that same year.

Barbara Gordon is the daughter of Gotham City police commissioner James Gordon, the sister of serial killer James Gordon Jr. and is initially employed as head of the Gotham City Public Library. Although the character appeared in various DC Comics publications, she was prominently featured in Batman Family which debuted in 1975, partnered with the original Robin, Dick Grayson, whom she has a history of working closely and being romantically involved with. In 1988, following the editorial retirement of the character's Batgirl persona in Batgirl Special #1, the graphic novel Batman: The Killing Joke depicts the Joker shooting her through the spinal cord in her civilian identity, resulting in paraplegia. In subsequent stories, the character was reestablished as a technical advisor, computer expert and information broker known as Oracle. Becoming a valuable asset providing intelligence and computer hacking services to assist other superheroes, she makes her first appearance as Oracle in Suicide Squad #23 (1989) and later became a featured lead of the Birds of Prey series. In 2011, as part of DC Comics The New 52 relaunch, Barbara recovered from her paralysis following a surgical procedure and returned as Batgirl. Barbara has since featured in the eponymous Batgirl monthly title as well as Birds of Prey and other Batman books. Following the events of Joker War, Barbara returned to her Oracle role while recovering from an injury, and continues to operate as both Batgirl and Oracle after the 2021 Infinite Frontier event.

The character was a popular comic book figure during the Silver Age of Comic Books, due to her appearances in the Batman television series and continued media exposure. She has achieved similar popularity in the Modern Age of Comic Books under the Birds of Prey publication and as a disabled icon. The character has been the subject of academic analysis concerning the roles of women, librarians, and disabled people in mainstream media. The events of The Killing Joke, which led to the character's paralysis, as well as the restoration of her mobility, have also been a subject of debate among comic book writers, artists, editors, and readership. Viewpoints range from sexism in comic books, to the limited visibility of disabled characters and the practicality of disabilities existing in a fictional universe where magic, technology, and medical science exceed the limitations of the real world.

As both Batgirl and Oracle, Barbara Gordon has been featured in various adaptations related to the Batman franchise, including television, film, animation, video games, and other merchandise. Aside from Craig, the character has been portrayed by Dina Meyer, Alicia Silverstone (as Barbara Wilson), and Jeté Laurence, and has been voiced by Melissa Gilbert, Tara Strong, Danielle Judovits, Alyson Stoner, Mae Whitman, Kimberly Brooks and Briana Cuoco among others. Barbara Gordon appeared in the third season of the HBO Max series Titans as the new commissioner of Gotham City portrayed by Savannah Welch. The character was slated for a solo film set in the DCEU, starring Leslie Grace in the title role and intended to be released on HBO Max. The film was canceled in August 2022. In 2011, Barbara Gordon ranked 17th in IGN's "Top 100 Comic Book Heroes".

== Publication history ==
=== Detective Comics, Batman Family and other appearances (1967–1988) ===
Cover of Detective Comics #359, "The Million Dollar Debut of Batgirl" (Jan. 1967), art by Carmine Infantino and Murphy Anderson

Before the introduction of Barbara Gordon, the Batwoman character and her sidekick Bat-Girl appeared in Batman-related publications but were eventually removed at the direction of editor Julius Schwartz for being outdated and unrealistic. Schwartz stated that he had been asked to develop a new female character to attract a female viewership to the Batman television series of the 1960s. Executive producer William Dozier suggested that the new character would be the daughter of Gotham City's Police Commissioner James Gordon, and that she would adopt the identity of Batgirl. When Dozier and producer Howie Horowitz saw rough concept artwork of the new Batgirl by artist Carmine Infantino during a visit to DC offices, they optioned the character in a bid to help sell a third season to the ABC television network. Infantino reflected on the creation of Batgirl, stating, "Bob Kane had had a Bat-Girl for about three stories in the '50s but she had nothing to do with a bat. She was like a pesky girl version of Robin. I knew we could do a lot better, so Julie and I came up with the real Batgirl, who was so popular she almost got her TV show." Yvonne Craig portrayed the character in the show's third season.

Barbara Gordon and her alter ego, Batgirl, first appeared in Detective Comics #359 (January 1967), titled "The Million Dollar Debut of Batgirl." Introduced as the daughter of Gotham City Police Commissioner James Gordon, Barbara dons a Batgirl costume—a black bodysuit with yellow gloves, boots, utility belt, and bat symbol, along with a blue cape and cowl—while en route to a costume party. During the event, she thwarts a kidnapping attempt on Bruce Wayne by the supervillain Killer Moth, drawing Batman's attention and marking the beginning of her crime-fighting career. Despite Batman's initial objections due to her gender, Batgirl continues her vigilante activities.

In her civilian identity, Barbara Gordon, Ph.D., is depicted as a career woman with a doctorate in library science, as well as being head of the Gotham City Public Library, "presumably one of the largest public libraries in the DC Comics version of reality." She was given a regular backup slot in Detective Comics starting with issue #384 (February 1969), alternating issues with Robin until issue #404, after which she had the backup slot to herself. Frank Robbins wrote nearly all of these backups, which were penciled first by Gil Kane and later by Don Heck. Barbara Gordon's Batgirl exceeded the earlier Bat-Girl and Batwoman characters in popularity, and readers requested for her to appear in other titles. Although some readers requested that Batwoman also continue to appear in the publication, DC responded to the fan-based acclaim and criticism of the new character in an open letter in Detective Comics #417 (1971), stating: "I'd like to say a few words about the reaction some readers have to Batgirl. These are readers who remember Batwoman and the other Bat-girls from years back ...They were there because romance seemed to be needed in Batman's life. But thanks to the big change and a foresighted editor, these hapless females are gone for good. In their place stands a girl who is a capable crime-fighter, a far cry from Batwoman who constantly had to be rescued [by] Batman."

Batgirl continues to appear in DC Comics publications throughout the late 1960s and 1970s, as a supporting character in Detective Comics, in addition to guest appearances in various titles such as Justice League of America, World's Finest Comics, The Brave and the Bold, Action Comics, and Superman. In the mid-1970s, Batgirl reveals her secret identity to her father (who had already discovered it on his own) and serves as a member of the United States House of Representatives. She moves to Washington, D.C., intending to give up her career as Batgirl and in June 1972, appeared in a story entitled "Batgirl's Last Case." Julius Schwartz brought her back a year later in Superman #268 (1973), in which she has a blind date with Clark Kent, establishing their friendship, and fights alongside Superman. Batgirl and Superman later team up twice more in Superman #279 and DC Comics Presents #19.

Batgirl also guest-starred in other Superman-related titles such as Adventure Comics, and in Superman Family #171, where she teams up with Supergirl. The character is given a starring role in DC's Batman Family comic book which debuted in 1975. The original Robin Dick Grayson became her partner in the series and the two were frequently referred to as the "Dynamite Duo: Batgirl & Robin." Batgirl meets Batwoman in Batman Family #10, when the retired superhero briefly returns to crime-fighting (before Kane is murdered by the Bronze Tiger). The two fight Killer Moth and the Cavalier, and learn each other's secret identities. Batwoman retires once again at the conclusion of the story, leaving Batgirl to continue crime-fighting. Although this series ended after three years of publication, Batgirl continued to appear in back-up stories published in Detective Comics through issue #519 (October 1982).

Barbara Gordon as Batgirl, as she appeared on a pin-up page in Detective Comics #483 (May 1979). Art by Dick Giordano.

Crisis on Infinite Earths, a limited miniseries published in 1985, was written to reduce the complex history of DC Comics to a single continuity. Although Batgirl is a featured character, her role is relatively small—she delivers Supergirl's eulogy in issue #7 of the 12-part series. The conclusion of Crisis on Infinite Earths changed DC Universe continuity in many ways. Following the reboot, Barbara Gordon is born to Roger and Thelma Gordon, and she is Jim Gordon's niece/adopted daughter in post-crisis continuity. Post-Crisis, Supergirl does not arrive on Earth until after Gordon has established herself as Oracle; many adventures she shared with Batgirl are retroactively described as having been experienced by Power Girl. In Secret Origins #20 featuring Batgirl and the Golden Age Dr. Mid-Nite (1987), Barbara Gordon's origin is rebooted by author Barbara Randall. Within the storyline, Gordon recounts the series of events that led to her career as Batgirl, including her first encounter with Batman as a child, studying martial arts under the tutelage of a sensei, memorizing maps and blueprints of the city, excelling in academics to skip grades, and pushing herself to become a star athlete.

=== Batgirl Special #1 and Batman: The Killing Joke (1988) ===
The Joker shoots Barbara Gordon in Batman: The Killing Joke. The injury results in the character's paralysis. Art by Brian Bolland and John Higgins.

DC officially retired the hero in the one-shot comic Batgirl Special #1 (July 1988), written by Barbara Kesel.

Later that year, Barbara Gordon appeared in Alan Moore's Batman: The Killing Joke. In this graphic novel, the Joker shoots and paralyzes Barbara in an attempt to drive her father insane, thereby proving to Batman that anyone can be morally compromised. Although events in The Killing Joke exert a great impact on the character, the story has little to do with her. In 2006, during an interview with Wizard, Moore expressed regret over his treatment of the character calling it "shallow and ill-conceived." He stated before writing the graphic novel, "I asked DC if they had any problem with me crippling Barbara Gordon—who was Batgirl at the time—and if I remember, I spoke to Len Wein, who was our editor on the project", and following a discussion with then-Executive Editorial Director Dick Giordano, "Len got back onto the phone and said, 'Yeah, okay, cripple the bitch.'" Although there has been speculation as to whether or not editors at DC specifically intended to have the character's paralysis become permanent, Brian Cronin, author of Was Superman A Spy?: And Other Comic Book Legends Revealed (2009) noted that DC had hired Barbara Kesel to write the Batgirl Special specifically to retire the character and set her in place for The Killing Joke.

Following the release of the graphic novel, comic book editor and writer Kim Yale discussed how distasteful she found the treatment of Barbara Gordon with her husband, fellow comic writer John Ostrander. Rather than allow the character to fall into obscurity, the two decided to revive her as a character living with a disability.

Gail Simone would include the character's paralysis in a list of "major female characters that had been killed, mutilated, and depowered", dubbing the phenomenon "Women in Refrigerators" in reference to a 1994 Green Lantern story where the title character discovers his girlfriend's mutilated body in his refrigerator.

=== Suicide Squad, Birds of Prey and other appearances (1989–2011) ===
Barbara Gordon as Oracle, in Suicide Squad #38 (January 1990). Art by Luke McDonnell and Geof Isherwood.

Yale and Ostrander oversaw the development of Barbara Gordon's new persona as Oracle for the next several years. The character made her first comic book appearance as Oracle in Suicide Squad #23, anonymously offering her services to the government's Task Force X. Oracle's true identity was first hinted at in Suicide Squad #26, which revealed that she kept a Batgirl plushie next to her computer. In the following two years, Oracle, under the pen of Ostrander and Yale, made guest appearances in various DC titles until her identity was revealed to be Barbara Gordon in Suicide Squad #38 (1990) and she officially becomes a member of the Squad in issue #48 following an invitation from Amanda Waller. In 1992, Dennis O'Neil wrote Oracle as Batman's trusted source of information in Batman: Sword of Azrael #1. This newly forged partnership established Oracle's status as an ongoing part of Batman's team. She is subsequently featured in the 12-issue miniseries The Hacker Files (1993). In "Oracle: Year One"—a story arc contained in The Batman Chronicles #5 (1996)—Yale and Ostrander tell the origin of Barbara Gordon's new persona as Oracle. Initially, Gordon's paralysis plunges her into a state of reactive depression. However, she soon realizes that her aptitude for and training in information sciences have provided her with tremendous skills that could be deployed to fight crime.

Barbara Gordon as Oracle in Oracle: The Cure #1 (May 2009), art by Guillem March

In a world increasingly centered on technology and information, she possesses a genius-level intellect; photographic memory; deep knowledge of computers and electronics; expert skills as a hacker; and graduate training in library sciences. One night, she has a dream in which an all-knowing woman (similar to the Oracle at Delphi of Greek mythology) has her face; it is then that she adopts "Oracle" as her codename. She serves as an information broker, gathering and disseminating intelligence to law enforcement organizations and members of the superhero community. She trains under the tutelage of Richard Dragon, one of DC's premiere martial artists, to engage in combat (using eskrima) from her wheelchair. She develops her upper-body strength and targeting skills with both firearms and batarangs.

The success of Chuck Dixon's Black Canary/Oracle: Birds of Prey (1996) led to the comic series Birds of Prey starring the two title characters. During Chuck Dixon's crossover series Nightwing: Hunt for Oracle, Barbara Gordon and Dinah Lance meet in person and establish a long-term friendship. They form the nucleus of the Birds of Prey organization. While Oracle serves as the basic head of operations, Black Canary becomes her full-time employee and field agent. In 2000, the first Batgirl monthly comic was launched with Cassandra Cain as the title character. Oracle appears as a supporting character throughout the series, acting as a mentor to the new Batgirl, alongside Batman. Gail Simone took over as writer of Birds of Prey with issue #56. Simone integrates the Huntress into the comic, making her a central character in the series as Oracle's secondary field agent. In 2003, comic book authors Scott Beatty and Chuck Dixon revised Barbara Gordon's origin with the miniseries Batgirl: Year One. Gordon is a highly gifted child having graduated from high school early, but initially desires to join law enforcement as opposed to vigilantism in the previous origin myths.

Oracle infected with the Brainiac virus, art by Adriana Melo

During the 2004 crossover event Batman: War Games, Black Mask commandeers Oracle's computers and satellites and engages in a fight to the death with Batman. To prevent Batman from killing his adversary, Oracle initiates the Clock Tower's self-destruct sequence, provoking Batman to rescue her rather than continue the battle. This destroys Gordon's home and headquarters in the clock tower. Subsequently, Oracle decides to move on and leaves Gotham City altogether. She cuts her ties with Batman, and after a temporary world trip with her team, relocates to Metropolis. In the events comprising Gail Simone's Birds of Prey: Between Dark and Dawn (2005), and Birds of Prey: The Battle Within (2005), Oracle is possessed by arch-villain Brainiac, an artificial intelligence entity, in order to become a biological being. Although Oracle overpowers Brainiac and expels him from her body, the advanced virus delivered by him remains despite his absence. The virus steadily causes cybernetic attachments to sprout all over her body. Oracle develops supernatural abilities that allow her to psychically interact with computer information systems. Although she loses these abilities after the virus is rendered dormant following an operation by Doctor Mid-Nite, she discovers she can move her toes. However, this proves to be short-lived; Gordon remains paralyzed.

During the company-wide crossover Infinite Crisis (2005), Oracle teams with the Martian Manhunter in Metropolis to coordinate a counterstrike against the Secret Society's global jailbreak. The renewed romance between Barbara Gordon and Dick Grayson is also cut short by the Infinite Crisis storyline.

When DC continuity jumps forward one year after the events of Infinite Crisis, Oracle and her team continue to work in Metropolis. Oracle works with Batman, although not regularly as before. Oracle continues to lead the Birds of Prey and expands the ranks of the operation. In Birds of Prey #99, Black Canary leaves the team and the Huntress becomes the team's de facto field leader, while Big Barda is brought in as the group's heavy-hitter alongside a larger, rotating roster. Oracle also attempts to reforge her alliance with Power Girl. However, when Oracle invites her to rejoin the team, she replies that she will do so "when Hell freezes over."

In the crossover event Countdown to Final Crisis (2007), Oracle dispatches the Question and Batwoman to capture Trickster and Piper following their role in the murder of Bart Allen. She struggles to keep the identities of the world's heroes from being stolen and coordinates the response to a global crisis engineered by the Calculator, a villainous hacker and information broker. In The All-New Booster Gold #5 (2007), the title hero is given the mission of traveling back in time in order to prevent "a tragedy that he discovers never should've happened—the Joker shooting and paralyzing Barbara Gordon, Batgirl." Although Booster Gold makes several attempts to prevent the events which took place in Batman: The Killing Joke, he ultimately fails and Barbara Gordon's chronological history remains unchanged. Rip Hunter convinces him that Barbara's destiny is to become Oracle. Later, Batman reveals that he kept Joker's photos of Barbara and Booster Gold for years and waited until Booster Gold's correct age before confronting him. Batman then thanks Booster Gold for trying to stop the Joker and offers him his friendship.

In "Whitewater", Gail Simone's final story arc on Birds of Prey (2007), Oracle and her team struggle for power with Spy Smasher, a government agent who has taken over the Birds of Prey organization. Eventually, Spy Smasher is forced to admit her defeat and returns control of the Birds of Prey organization to Oracle. After the arc, Oracle also adopts Misfit into the Birds of Prey. Sean McKeever temporarily took over as author of Birds of Prey, writing issues #113–117, Birds of Prey: Metropolis or Dust (2008). The following arc of the series Birds of Prey: Platinum Flats (2008) is written by Tony Bedard. In the company-wide 2008 Final Crisis storyline, Darkseid—who has finally gained control of the Anti-Life Equation—attempts to put the mind-control equation on the internet. Both Oracle and Mister Terrific make desperate attempts to stop Darkseid, even attempting to shut down the entire Internet. Unfortunately, they both fail and those affected ended up mindless slaves of Darkseid. Freed from Darkseid's control after the restoration of the Multiverse, she attempts to shut down the criminal Unternet set up by her opposite number, the Calculator, as a Darkseid-free replacement for the regular Internet and still used by tech-savvy criminals. However, the Calculator, preventing her moves, takes control of the Kilg%re, gaining the ability to thrive in cyberspace by controlling digital and cybernetic avatars, and tracks Oracle down with his newfound powers. Even though Oracle foils him, she starts doubting her abilities and fears she's losing her edge and brilliance, which results in her disbanding the Birds of Prey team to do some soul-searching. Birds of Prey received cancellation in early 2009, with the final issue being #127.

Oracle is subsequently featured in Oracle: The Cure, a limited series written by Kevin VanHook and a crossover arc with Batman: Battle for the Cowl (2009). The story chronologically follows the events of the Final Crisis and Batman R.I.P. (2008). Oracle has returned to Gotham, and although the Birds of Prey are disbanded, she continues to summon them to help Nightwing and Robin deal with the growing crime in Gotham. The Calculator's plans finally come to their fruition, and Kuttler, hoping to save his dying daughter Wendy takes on the "Babbage" alias and begins prowling the digital world of Alta Viva, a virtual world game, for fragments of the Anti-Life Equation unleashed by Darkseid. Oracle, now living in a dilapidated rented apartment in Gotham, becomes aware of Kuttler's activities after "Cheesefiend", one of her informants, is brutally killed, with the Anti-Life Equation itself, after coming in contact with Babbage. Hoping to stop the Calculator and prevent him from piecing together the fragments of the Anti-Life Equation in his possession, Oracle travels to Hong Kong, hoping to steal them back by the means of an advanced supercomputer programmed to track the chunk of data left behind by Babbage. However, the Calculator discovers her attempts, swearing vengeance upon her. She manages to defeat Calculator, rendering the Anti-Life Equation's fragments useless.

In 2009, the Batgirl comic book was relaunched with Stephanie Brown starring as the title character. Although Oracle initially tries to discourage Brown from crime-fighting, she eventually comes to accept her as Batgirl. She also mentors the Calculator's daughter, Wendy Harris, who was disabled following an attack at Titans Tower. Oracle later takes a job as an assistant professor at Gotham University. During the Green Lantern limited series Blackest Night, Hal Jordan crashes into the Bat-Signal after a fight with the Black Lantern Martian Manhunter. Oracle and Commissioner Gordon are both present. Origins & Omens hints towards an involvement in the storyline. After sending Green Lantern's intel to every superhero community across the planet of the Black Lanterns, the Gordons find themselves being attacked by the original Dark Knight's deceased rogue gallery members, who are all reanimated by the Black Lantern Corps. Oracle and her father are forced to fight for their lives as they witness the Black Lanterns massacring everyone on sight at Gotham Central. During the crisis, Oracle is rendered unconscious by an explosion and is possessed by Deadman, who uses Oracle's body to save Commissioner Gordon from the reanimated King Snake and the Trigger Twins. After being rescued by Batman, Robin, and Red Robin, the Gordons were attacked by Batman and Red Robin's parents with their saviors, the reanimated Graysons and the Drakes. While Grayson and Drake battle the Black Lanterns, Robin takes the Gordons to their underground base where Alfred tends her and her father's wounds.

In Greg Rucka's Detective Comics #862, Barbara Gordon is approached by Huntress and Renee Montoya (the new Question) for help in tracking down a mysterious criminal who ordered a hit on them. Montoya is flabbergasted upon discovering that "Commissioner Gordon's daughter" is a superhero. In 2010, Birds of Prey was relaunched with Gail Simone returning to write the comic. The first arc is a tie-in with the Green Lantern Brightest Day limited series. Oracle reforms the Birds of Prey, this time with Dove and the recently resurrected Hawk as members. A new villainess calling herself the White Canary begins menacing the Birds, and publicly reveals Black Canary's civilian identity and frames her for a murder. While the team contends with White Canary in the streets of Gotham, Oracle is kidnapped by her former associates, Savant and Creote. This is eventually revealed to be a ruse in order to trick White Canary. Following the team's victory against White Canary, Oracle fakes her death during a battle with Calculator. With most of the criminal underworld now believing that she is dead, Oracle cuts off ties with all but a select few Gotham heroes, and is shown refusing to help Blue Beetle, Manhunter, and Booster Gold when they attempt to call her for assistance during battle.

In Grant Morrison's Batman: The Return (2010), an installment of the limited series Bruce Wayne: The Road Home (2010), Batman enlists Oracle to help him run Batman Incorporated, a new global team of Batmen. He tasks her with helping him fight crime on a virtual front and shows her a new modified Batgirl design that acts as her virtual avatar. Oracle is later shown directing Cassandra Cain, now known as "Black Bat", on a mission in Hong Kong, where she captures some heroin smugglers for Batman. In Scott Snyder's Black Mirror storyline, Barbara Gordon is kidnapped by her brother, James Gordon Jr., who had returned to Gotham after a lengthy absence to become a serial killer. He stabs her in both of her legs, positioning the knives so that if she removes them, she will bleed to death. As she slowly bleeds, she can use her wits to distract him long enough for Batman and Commissioner Gordon to arrive and defeat her brother.

=== The New 52: Batgirl, Birds of Prey, and other appearances (2011–2016) ===
In September 2011, following the company-wide relaunch, Barbara Gordon stars in a new Batgirl series—one of The New 52 titles featuring the company's most iconic characters. The conclusion of the limited series Flashpoint (2011) establishes a new continuity within the DC Universe, with all characters regressing to a younger age and earlier stage in their careers while remaining in a modern timeline. DC Senior VP of Sales, Bob Wayne, explained that with each of their titles reverting to issue #1, "our creative teams have the ability to take a more modern approach—not only with each character, but with how the characters interact with one another and the universe as a whole, and focus on the earlier part of the careers of each of our iconic characters." Barbara Gordon is the biological daughter of James Gordon and Barbara Eileen Gordon in this continuity. Wayne also stated that "The Killing Joke still happened and she was Oracle. Now she will go through physical rehabilitation and become a more seasoned and nuanced character because she had these incredible and diverse experiences. Public reaction to the change has been mixed and has included criticism that DC has reduced the diversity of their character lineup, as well as "being disrespectful of the power the character had gained as a symbol to the disabled community in her role as Oracle."

DC Comics co-publisher Dan DiDio explained the decision by stating that, "[w]e didn't want to turn our back on the diversity issue, but she'll always be the most recognizable [Batgirl]. We are working with concerns to diversify the line. We're always looking to re-position to be reflective of today's audience." Gail Simone, who will be writing the series, stated: "For many years, I got to write the character as Oracle, and there is to this day, no character who means more to me. This is classic Barbara as she was originally conceived, with a few big surprises. It's a bit of a shock, to be sure, but we're doing everything we can to be respectful to this character's amazing legacy, while presenting something thrilling that a generation of comics readers will be experiencing for the first time ... Barbara Gordon leaping, fighting, and swinging over Gotham. Now, when citizens of that city look up, they are going to see BATGIRL. And that is absolutely thrilling."

In the new, revised continuity, the events of The Killing Joke took place three years before the current storyline, and while it is established she was paraplegic during that time, Barbara Gordon is written as having regained her mobility after undergoing experimental surgery at a South African clinic. Series writer Gail Simone stated that while the character is "one of the smartest and toughest women in comics ... One thing the book is truly about, is that the after-effects of something like PTSD (post-traumatic stress disorder) or other trauma-related syndromes, can strike even very smart, very intellectually tough people, even soldiers and cops," a subject that is generally overlooked in comic books. She also explained the method of the character's recovery is based upon real-life experiences, in that, "some of the best real-world work in the field of mobility rehabilitation is coming from South Africa. People have been talking about this as if it's some sort of mystical thing like returning from the dead, but there are treatments and surgeries that can restore mobility in some cases. Barbara's spine was not severed. That makes her a candidate."

Prior to release, Batgirl #1 sold out at the distribution level with over 100,000 copies printed in its first run according to Diamond Comic Distributors. Along with Action Comics #1, Justice League #1, Batman #1, Batman and Robin #1, Batman: The Dark Knight #1, Detective Comics #1, Flash #1, Green Lantern #1, and Superman #1, retailers were required to order a second printing. Calvin Reid of Publishers Weekly states in a review of the first issue: "The artwork is okay, though conventional, while Simone's script tries to tie up of the end of the previous Barbara Gordon/Oracle storyline and setup up the new Batgirl. Her formula: murderous villains, blood splattering violence and high flying superheroics mixed with single-white-female bonding ... plus a cliffhanger ending to the first issue that offers a nifty [segue] into the new world of Barbara Gordon and Batgirl." The New York Times critic George Gene Gustines wrote: "Unlike some of the other DC comics I read this week, Batgirl achieves a deft hat trick: a well-shaped reintroduction to a character, an elegant acknowledgement of fundamental history and the establishment of a new status quo. This is a must-buy series." Earning a B+ rating in a review from Entertainment Weekly, Ken Tucker writes that Simone "[takes] her Birds of Prey storytelling powers and focuses them on the newly revived Barbara Gordon as Batgirl. The result is a burst of exhilaration, as Barbara/Batgirl revels in her new freedom even as she encounters a so-far not-terribly-chilling villain called Mirror."

Since the series relaunch in September 2011, Batgirl has remained within the top 30 of the 300 best-selling monthly comic book publications sold in North America. Monthly estimated sales figures are as follows: Batgirl #1 with 81,489 copies (ranked 12th overall), Batgirl #2 with 75,227 (ranked 14th), Batgirl #3 with 62,974 (ranked 18th), Batgirl #4 with 53,975 (ranked 23rd), Batgirl #5 with 51,327 (ranked 26th), and Batgirl #6 with 47,836 (ranked 30th). The hardcover edition of volume 1, Batgirl: The Darkest Reflection, which collects issues #1–6, made The New York Times Best Seller list, alongside Animal Man: The Hunt, Batman & Robin: Born to Kill, Batman: Detective Comics, Wonder Woman: Blood, Batwoman: Hydrology, Green Lantern: Sinestro.

Additionally, Barbara Gordon makes an appearance in Birds of Prey #1, where Black Canary offers her a spot on the new Birds of Prey roster. She declines Canary's invitation, suggesting that Katana take her place instead. Series writer Duane Swierczynski has stated that Batgirl will join the team in issue #4. He commented that while she "is an essential part of this team", she is not the focus of the series, as she is hesitant to be associated with the other characters because of their status as outlaws.

In October 2014, the monthly Batgirl title underwent a soft reboot with the new creative team Brenden Fletcher (writer) Cameron Stewart (writer, layouts), Babs Tarr (artist) and Maris Wicks (colors). The first six-issue story explored Barbara Gordon's attempt to start a new life as a PhD student in the hip Gotham borough of Burnside. While seemingly light and engaging compared to Gail Simone's darker preceding run, the new arc ultimately dealt with Babs' inability to fully escape her earlier trauma and the villain was revealed as her own brain scans, an algorithm similar to the pre-New 52 Oracle. While the reboot was highly praised for its innovative use of social media, its fun and energy, and particularly for Tarr's art, several critics condemned the villain Dagger Type in issue #37 as a transphobic caricature. In response, the creative team issued a joint apology and revised the issue for the subsequent collected edition, Batgirl Vol. 1: The Batgirl of Burnside.

On March 13, 2015, DC Comics released 25 Joker-themed variant covers for its various monthly series for release that June, in celebration of the character's 75th anniversary. Among them was a cover to Batgirl #41 by artist Rafael Albuquerque that took its inspiration from The Killing Joke. The cover depicts the Joker standing next to a tearful Batgirl, who has a red smile painted across her mouth. The Joker has one hand holding a revolver draped over Batgirl's shoulder and is pointing to her cheek with the other hand as if gesturing to shoot her.

The cover quickly drew criticism for highlighting a dark period in the character's history, especially when juxtaposed with the youthful, more optimistic direction of the series at the time. The hashtag #changethecover drew hundreds of posts on Twitter and Tumblr asking DC to not release the variant. DC ultimately withdrew the cover from publication at the request of Albuquerque, who stated, "My intention was never to hurt or upset anyone through my art...For that reason, I have recommended to DC that the variant cover be pulled."

=== DC Rebirth: Batgirl (vol. 5) and Batgirl and the Birds of Prey (2016–2020) ===
Barbara Gordon as she appeared on the variant cover of Batman (vol. 3) #50 (September 2018) by J. Scott Campbell.

From Batgirl (vol. 5) #34 (June 2019). Art by Joshua Middleton.

In March 2016, DC Comics announced it would be relaunching all of its monthly titles in an initiative called DC Rebirth. The relaunch restored elements of the pre-"Flashpoint" DC continuity while maintaining elements of The New 52 as well. The DC Rebirth Batgirl would remain Barbara Gordon, who would star in two monthly series: Batgirl (vol. 5), written by Hope Larson, and Batgirl and the Birds of Prey, written by Julie Benson and Shawna Benson. The two comic book titles debuted in July and August 2016, respectively. In volume five of Batgirl, Barbara Gordon is a student attending Burnside College in the trendy Burnside neighborhood of Gotham City.

Barbara later resumes her role as Oracle, providing comms and tactical support to the Birds of Prey and the Batman Family once again, as part of the 2020 Infinite Frontier relaunch, which restores much of the DC Universe status quo from before The New 52. She takes on the role during the Joker War storyline when the team needs a greater tactical advantage than ever to overcome the Joker's latest plot, and after her spinal support implant begins to show signs of overuse. However, she retains the right to join Cassandra Cain and Stephanie Brown in suiting up as Batgirl again in the future.

=== Infinite Frontier: Batgirl (2020–2021) ===
In Infinite Frontier #0, she explains to Huntress that Cassandra Cain and Stephanie Brown have reclaimed the Batgirl identity and operate as Batgirls, while Barbara retains the right to occasionally operate as Batgirl herself. Barbara subsequently serves primarily as Oracle, providing information and technological support to the Bat-Family while continuing to participate in field operations when necessary.

=== Dawn of DC: Batgirl (2023–2024) ===
During the Dawn of DC era, Barbara continued to operate primarily as Oracle while occasionally resuming the Batgirl identity. Cassandra Cain and Stephanie Brown continued to share the Batgirl mantle, with Barbara supporting them and other members of the Bat-Family through her intelligence and technological expertise. In the Knight Terrors story arc of 2023, Batgirl engages battle with Punchline and Royal Flush Gang, after discovering them trying to infiltrate the Clock Tower while other members of the Batfamily are away in the Knightmare Realm.

=== All In: Barbara Gordon: Breakout (2024–present) ===
Following the conclusion of Dawn of DC, Barbara continued to appear as both Oracle and Batgirl as the DC Universe entered the DC All In era. Her dual role continued the status quo established during Infinite Frontier, with Barbara functioning as an information specialist and strategist while remaining capable of operating in the field. Her relationships with Cassandra Cain and Stephanie Brown remained an important part of her role within the Bat-Family.

In 2026, DC announced Barbara Gordon: Breakout as part of DC Next Level, a series written by Mariko Tamaki and illustrated by Amancay Nahuelpan as part of the publisher's Next Level initiative. The series places Barbara in a new situation in which she is imprisoned in Supermax after being arrested for aiding Batman and his allies, who have been declared outlaws by Gotham City Police Commissioner Vandal Savage. The series began publication in May 2026 and explores Barbara relying on her intelligence, determination, and investigative abilities while attempting to escape confinement.

== Alternative versions ==
Various alterations of the Barbara Gordon character have appeared in storylines published in and out of mainstream continuity titles. Variants of the character within continuity often appear in stories that involve time travel, such as the crossover limited series Zero Hour: Crisis in Time, a follow-up story preceded by the 1985 limited series Crisis on Infinite Earths which altered mainstream continuity. Notable imprints of DC Comics such as Elseworlds and All Star DC Comics have also featured alternate versions of the character.

=== Elseworlds ===
Barbara Gordon, as both Batgirl and Oracle, has made several appearances in Elseworlds comics since 1997. The Elseworlds imprint takes the company's iconic characters and places them in alternate timelines, places and events making heroes "as familiar as yesterday seem as fresh as tomorrow." The character is given starring roles in the noir-style storyline Thrillkiller: Batgirl & Robin (1997), its sequel Batgirl + Batman: Thrillkiller '62 (1998), and the one-shot comic Elseworld's Finest: Supergirl & Batgirl (1998), all of which depict worlds where Barbara is Gotham's first bat-themed hero (Bruce Wayne is a police detective who becomes Batman in the 1960s-set Thrillkiller series, and merely serves as essentially her 'Alfred' in Elseworld's Finest in a timeline where Jim Gordon was killed rather than the Waynes).

Barbara Gordon on the cover of Batgirl: Futures End #1 (Nov. 2014), art by Clay Mann

In addition, the character has supporting roles in JLA: The Nail (1998), JLA: Created Equal (2000), Superman & Batman: Generations (2003), Batman: Year 100 (2006), and Batman: Earth One (2012). A version of her appears as "Nightwing" in the Smallville comic series, replacing Stephanie Brown as previously promoted.

Barbara Gordon aka Nightwing is featured as Batman's partner in the Smallville Season 11 digital comic based on the TV series, in addition to being a valued member of Wayne Enterprises R&D.

=== All Star Batgirl ===
In 2005, DC Comics launched its All-Star imprint—an ongoing series of comics designed to pair the company's most iconic characters with the most acclaimed writers and artists in the industry. Similar to Elseworlds, All-Star is not restricted to continuity and establishes a fresh perspective for the latest generation of readership. According to Dan DiDio, "[t]hese books are created to literally reach the widest audience possible, and not just the comic book audience, but anyone who has ever wanted to read or see anything about Superman or Batman."

An alternate Barbara Gordon was adapted into Frank Miller's All Star Batman and Robin the Boy Wonder (2005) as a teenage Batgirl. In addition, another variation of the character had been set to star in an eponymous All Star Batgirl title, written by Geoff Johns; however, the series was canceled prior to publication.

=== Future's End ===
In Batgirl: Futures End #1 (Nov. 2014), set in an alternate future, a trio of Batgirls include Cassandra Cain, Stephanie Brown, and newcomer Tiffany Fox—the daughter of Lucius Fox and the first African American character to be portrayed as Batgirl.

=== DC Bombshell ===
In 2015, DC began publishing DC Bombshells, a title that places its characters in an alternate history primarily set during the 1930s and 1940s. In digital issue #42 (collected as print issue #14), Harley Quinn tells Pamela Isley about encountering "the Belle of the Bog", who appears to be a vampire version of Batgirl. DC Comics Bombshells Annual #1, published on 31 August 2016, reveals that Barbara Gourdon was a French fighter pilot during World War I. After she lost her boyfriend during the war, she traveled to Louisiana and did indeed become a vampire.

=== Batman '89 ===
In the Batman '89 miniseries (which takes place in an alternate continuity of the Tim Burton films), Barbara Gordon is a Sergeant in the GCPD and Harvey Dent's fiancée. She has a strained relationship with her father and works with Dent to bring Batman down as both see him as a threat. She turns on Dent after a freak accident disfigured his face and drove him to become a criminal and attempted to arrest him, but her efforts were thwarted by Catwoman. Following the deaths of both her father and Dent, she receives a posthumous package from Dent revealing Batman's secret identity and a letter from Catwoman offering her partnership to incriminate Batman and Gotham's power elite.

=== DC x Sonic the Hedgehog ===
Barbara Gordon / Batgirl appears in DC x Sonic the Hedgehog: Metal Legion,. She makes a cameo in the third issue, where she is shown to have befriended and partnered with Tangle the Lemur.

=== Absolute Universe ===
An alternate universe version of Barbara Gordon appears in Absolute Batman. This version is a police officer, and later becomes Batman's ally, taking the usual role of her father.

== Critical and editorial commentary ==
One could argue that curing Barbara and allowing her to be Batgirl again would simply allow her to do more good fighting crime than she ever could in a wheelchair, but then you look insensitive to the ability and usefulness she has in other capacities as Oracle. Conversely, you could say that removing Barbara from her wheelchair drastically alters her character, but then wouldn't that indicate that this is a character defined by her handicap? This begs the question of why so many fans adore her: is it because she's a bold and daring leader that rivals the Calculator in brains? Or is it because she's all of that, but stuck in a wheelchair? Think about the question, and surely many of you will find an answer you don't like.

— CraveOnline, 2009

In the aftermath of Batman: The Killing Joke, Barbara Gordon's paralysis has been the subject of debate, with arguments in favor of, and against, restoring her mobility. Writers, artists, editorial staff, and critics have spoken at great length about the nature of the subject, citing responses from the readership, issues of sexism, diversity, and representation, as well as other considerations that have impacted decisions regarding the character's portrayal.

=== Commentary in favor of Batgirl ===
Reacting to The Killing Joke and Barbara Gordon's later character development as Oracle in Batman: Gotham Knights, Ray Tate, a reviewer at Comics Bulletin, wrote "[t]here is absolutely no reason why Barbara Gordon should be in a wheelchair. Alan Moore and Brian Bolland meant The Killing Joke as an imaginary tale dealing with the iconography of Batman and the Joker ... [Batman] himself is a certifiable genius in biochemistry. There are countless examples of Batman employing that which is only theoretical in his fight against crime. His knowledge of stem cell technology should surpass that of the real world. There is simply no reason for Barbara Gordon to be confined to that wheelchair." Regarding her representation as a character living with a disability, and her effectiveness as a hero compared to her incarnation as Batgirl, Tate asserts "[i]t's ridiculous to think somebody wakes up thinking how lucky they are to be confined to a wheelchair, and yet the attitude around DC and among the fans is that Oracle is the better character over Batgirl because of her handicap. Rubbish. Batgirl has fought more crime and done more to aid Batman as Batgirl than she has as Oracle. Batgirl has saved Batman's life on numerous occasions. Oracle has not. Barbara in this incarnation is not a bad character, but she is not better because she no longer hunts the night in cape and cowl." In an article for Bitch magazine entitled "The Cold Shoulder: Saving Superheroines from Comic-book Violence", Shannon Cochran noted a long history of inequality regarding the treatment of female heroes. She quotes Gail Simone, who discussed the gender difference in the treatment of Batman and Batgirl regarding paralysis: "Both had their backs broken [Batman broke his in a dramatic Batcave confrontation with the villain Bane; Batgirl broke hers when she was ambushed in her home and shot in the spine by the Joker, never given a chance to fight]. Less than a year later, Batman was fine. Batgirl—now named Oracle—was in a wheelchair and remained so for many years."

Artist Alex Ross and writer/producer Paul Dini made attempts to return the character to her original conception. Ross explained in an interview that he and Dini had planned to restore her mobility by placing her in a Lazarus Pit, a naturally occurring chemical pool in the DC Universe that has rejuvenating effects when a person is submerged within it. He stated that "we pitched then-Batman editor Denny O'Neil with these drawings of that costume design. The idea of using the red instead of the traditional yellow was meant to invoke the idea that coming from the Lazarus Pit, she was in a way, more compromised as a character ... Denny shot it down, because, according to him, everybody loves Barbara Gordon as Oracle and as a handicapped character. The theory was that DC didn't have enough handicapped characters, so they weren't going to do anything with Barbara as she was. And the design went into the drawer." Kate Kane, the modern Batwoman introduced during 52, wears a variation of what would have been Gordon's new Batgirl costume designed by Ross.

=== Commentary in favor of Oracle ===
Without much fanfare, Barbara Gordon has become the most popular handicapped character since Charles Xavier ... There WAS some idea of her being a role model ... We wanted her to cope with what had happened to her and becoming, in many ways, more effective as Oracle than she ever was as Batgirl. And we knew that others with disabilities might look at her and feel good reading about her ... I don't think people 'dance around' her disabilities as they don't want to focus on them but her character. These shouldn't be stories about a disabled person; they are stories about a compelling fascinating character who HAPPENS to be in a wheelchair and I think that's correct. Barbara isn't her handicap; there's more to her than that.

— John Ostrander, Comic Book Resources

Although critical reception of Barbara Gordon's evolution into Oracle has been mixed among critics and other observers, according to John Ostrander: "We have, over the years, on those occasions when I have worked with the character, gotten some letters from those who have disabilities of one stripe or another and all have been very supportive. I feel very proud for my part in creating Oracle." Supporters of Oracle argue that the Barbara Gordon character provides a greater service to DC Comics and its readers as a disabled character, regardless of the events that caused her paralysis. In her persona as Oracle, Barbara Gordon is not limited to the Batman Family, serving a unique and universal role in the DC universe. DC Senior Vice President Dan DiDio comments, "Some stories ... are so strong that undoing them would be a crime. The DCU would be a lesser place without Barry's sacrifice or the crippling of Barbara at the hands of the Joker."

The character went through possible restoration during Birds of Prey when she is infected with microscopic machines known as nanites by the supervillain Brainiac, which attempted to repair her DNA. Marc Dipaolo, author of War, Politics and Superheroes: Ethics and Propaganda in Comics and Film (2011) commented that DC writers and editors would not allow her to recover completely, and that "[t]he decision was made because there were not enough handicapped superheroes in the DC Universe to justify 'curing' one, and because it would have been odd to see Barbara Gordon escape from her wheelchair in the world of fiction when Christopher Reeve never had that opportunity."

=== Restoration of the character's mobility and aftermath ===
In June 2011, DC announced that Barbara Gordon would be returning to the role of Batgirl in September 2011, in her own eponymous monthly comic, as part of a company-wide relaunch of all of their titles. In addition, former Birds of Prey writer Gail Simone would be writing the series. This announcement became one of the most controversial aspects of the DC Comics relaunch. Supporters of Barbara Gordon in her persona as Oracle expressed dismay over losing an iconic character for the disabled community. Journalist and blogger Jill Pantozzi, who is diagnosed with muscular dystrophy, stated that "people being disabled is part of the real world, it is essential it be part of the fictional world as well... Writer Kevin Van Hook did a great job showing what disabled individuals have to go through in the mini-series Oracle: The Cure. It's that type of honesty I expect more of ... While some diverse characters were mishandled over the years, Oracle was always treated with the utmost respect but this move is the most disrespectful I've seen in a long time." Gail Simone responded directly by stating that at times when others had attempted to restore Gordon's mobility, she fought to keep her as a disabled character, even in light of requests from readers who also had disabilities that wished to see the character healed. However, part of her reasoning for reversing her decision and writing Batgirl with Gordon as the title character was that "[a]rms and legs get ripped off, and they grow back, somehow. Graves don't stay filled. But the one constant is that Barbara stays in that chair. Role model or not, that is problematic and uncomfortable, and the excuses to not cure her, in a world of purple rays and magic and super-science, are often unconvincing or wholly meta-textual. And the longer it goes on, the more it has stretched credibility. But now, everything has changed. If nearly everyone in the DCU, not just Batgirl but almost everyone, is now at a much earlier stage in their career, then my main objection no longer applies, because we are seeing Barbara at an earlier starting point."

Former Batman writer and editor Dennis O'Neil and Oracle co-creator John Ostrander have expressed disappointment over the change. O'Neil stated that during his tenure at DC, "[W]e had hordes of people in spandex beating up criminals ... We didn't have anybody like Oracle, who overcame a disability and was just as valuable and just as effective in a way that didn't involve violence." However, he also stated that from an alternate point of view, "Barbara Gordon's perception in the mainstream public as Batgirl would be a very valid consideration." Ostrander continues to view Oracle as a stronger character than Batgirl but has also expressed faith in Gail Simone's skills as a writer. He commented that "[t]imes change and characters and people evolve. I changed things when I wrote characters, including changing Barbara to Oracle. Others do the same for this era ... Gail Simone is a good friend and a wonderful writer and I'm sure her work will be wonderful."

== Characterization ==
=== Silver Age ===
Barbara Gordon debuting as Batgirl in Detective Comics #359 (January 1967). Art by Carmine Infantino.

At the time of her conception, Barbara Gordon's character was intended to reflect the women's liberation movement as an educated, career-oriented young woman, as well as a capable crimefighter. Batgirl is considered to be one of the most popular characters to have emerged during the Silver Age of Comic Books. In The Supergirls: Fashion, Feminism, Fantasy, and the History of Comic Book Heroines (2009), author Mike Madrid states: "While she embodied the spirit of a new wave of liberated superheroines, in the backdrop of the history of comic books, Batgirl carried on the tradition of the gutsy female vigilantes of the '40s who struck out on their own to right wrongs." Although she is discouraged by Batman to engage in crime-fighting, she defiantly ignores his objections. Her career choice as a librarian is speculated to be due in part to the fact that it works as a convincing cover for her much more dangerous work as Batgirl. To conceal her identity from not only her enemies, but her father, Commissioner Gordon, and Batman and Robin, she initially conforms to appearance and personality traits stereotypical of a librarian. In her civilian identity, she is seen with her hair "tied up tightly in a bun. And she wears traditionally conservative—not to say dowdy—clothing. In other words, she embodies the stereotypical image of the female librarian of the day—busy doing clerical tasks while attired and made up in such a way as to guarantee to minimize whatever physical attractiveness she might possess beneath her frumpy exterior." Although her introduction was intended to embody feminist ideology, aspects of her persona were also considered to be sexist, such as the fact that "[m]uch of her arsenal was carried in a Bat-purse attached to her utility belt[.]"

=== Bronze Age ===
Despite shortcomings in her characterization during the late 1960s, "by the early 1970s, Batgirl had matured, using her keen intellect, athletic dexterity, and burgeoning detective skills to solve petty and not-so-petty thefts". Her color scheme from the Adventures of Batman cartoon is used as her primary outfit. However, by the end of the Bronze Age of Comic Books in the mid-1980s (and with the dark, gritty influence of Frank Miller's work on the Batman-related titles), Batgirl became less valuable to the franchise "where there was not as much room for a librarian fighting crime in high heels". In this environment, Barbara Gordon becomes increasingly skeptical of her effectiveness as Batgirl until she decides to give up crime-fighting permanently.

=== Modern Age ===
Robin Anne Reid, in her 2008 book, Women in Science Fiction and Fantasy: Overviews notes a lack of characterization given to Barbara Gordon by Alan Moore in Batman: The Killing Joke, stating, "Barbara Gordon was not portrayed as the intelligent and resourceful woman who assumed the Batgirl persona; she was portrayed as a cocoa-serving homemaker overly concerned with the mess her father was making cutting and pasting news clippings." Following the character's recreation as Oracle, she is shown having overcome her paralysis at the hands of the Joker by utilizing her intellect to once again engage in crime-fighting as an information broker. Speaking on her characterization as a person living with a disability, comic writer Devin Grayson stated that being "[h]yper-defensive about her [paralysis], she has, if anything, overcompensated. However, her very determination to remain self-reliant, though admirable and inspiring, has made her less willing than ever to accept support or aid of any kind."

A defining characteristic of Barbara Gordon is her sense of morality, which differs from that of Batman and her primary field agent Black Canary. She has demonstrated a willingness to use lethal force, such as in Chuck Dixon's Birds of Prey issue #10, "State of War", which contradicts the methodology used by her closest allies and most DC Comics characters. Dixon stated in an interview that "[s]he's less morally conflicted than other characters. She's very 'means to an end' oriented. She sees that sometimes you have to kill to save lives. She's not comfortable with that but accepts it. She would do anything to avoid using deadly force but, when push comes to shove, she'll drop the hammer." She demonstrates a similar moral ambiguity in Gail Simone's Birds of Prey: Of Like Minds when she argues with Black Canary over using illegally obtained information, which denies criminals the right of due process. Although the Huntress has never been opposed to using lethal force, she also comes into conflict with Oracle over the fact that she will use the psychological impact of a mission to subconsciously manipulate her field agents into conforming to her ideology.

In an interview, Simone explained her fondness for Barbara Gordon, stating: "Kim Yale and John Ostrander picked up the character and made her into a brilliant master computer operator and one of the most fascinating characters in comics. From there, Chuck Dixon did wonderful things with her in his Birds of Prey run ... She's fantastic because even just sitting in a chair in a dark room by herself, she's tremendously compelling. The DCU without her would be a much less interesting place."

=== The New 52 ===
As part of DC Comics' 2011 relaunch, The New 52, Barbara Gordon's paralysis is described as lasting only three years. In Batgirl (volume 4), the character's age is reduced, and she is depicted as a recent college graduate, having earned a degree in forensic psychology. Although she resumes her work as Batgirl one year after recovering her mobility, she continues to have posttraumatic stress disorder, causing her to hesitate in battle when exposed to gunfire that could result in receiving new spinal damage. The character also exhibits survivor guilt because she has made a full recovery from her paralysis while others have not. In a September 2011 interview, Gail Simone stated, "I'm enjoying writing Batgirl at this stage in her life. She's younger, she doesn't know everything, she's been immersed in school and her life plan. Events conspire to change that plan, and she's nervous about that. I love writing Barbara under pretty much any conditions, but this really is a key time for her." In Batgirl #45, Barbara Gordon began a romantic relationship with Luke Fox, the son of Lucius Fox and the new Batwing. Some of the character's background and previous relationships were erased. According to the artist of the new Batgirl series, Babs Tarr, Barbara Gordon and Dick Grayson were never romantically involved in the New 52 continuity.

=== DC Rebirth ===
For DC's 2016 DC Rebirth launch, Barbara Gordon headlines two monthly series: Batgirl (vol. 5) and Batgirl and the Birds of Prey. Batgirl (vol. 5), which is written by Hope Larson and illustrated by Rafael Albuquerque, begins with Barbara touring Asia to train with Eastern fighters. Batgirl and the Birds of Prey, which is written by Julie and Shawna Benson, and is illustrated by Claire Roe, reunites her with former teammates the Black Canary and the Huntress (Helena Bertinelli). The first arc of the series restores her prior history as "Oracle", as the team works to track down an impostor using the alias. In the DC Rebirth continuity, Barbara continues to operate in Burnside after training in Asia. She also shows a renewed romantic interest in Dick Grayson, but is unsuccessful due to him already being in a relationship.

At the conclusion of the Joker War story arc (which spanned several Batfamily titles), Barbara Gordon appears to take a break as Batgirl and, for now, shift more to working tech support again as Oracle. Many critics and fans have expressed interest in having Barbara as both Batgirl and Oracle, since she's capable of doing both. Batman & the Outsiders Issue 17 and The Joker War Zone indicate that Cassandra Cain (aka Orphan) and Stephanie Brown (aka Spoiler) will both be Batgirls again.

=== New Justice ===
During the New Justice era, Barbara Gordon continued to operate as both Batgirl and Oracle. Following the events of the Joker War, she increasingly relied on the Oracle identity to coordinate the activities of the Bat-Family and other superheroes, while continuing to participate in missions as Batgirl. Barbara's role emphasized her intelligence, technological expertise, and ability to function as an information and communications hub for other heroes. Her relationship with Cassandra Cain and Stephanie Brown also developed as both characters resumed the Batgirl identity, allowing Barbara to serve as a mentor and ally while maintaining her own superhero career.

=== Infinite Frontier ===
In the Infinite Frontier era, Barbara continued to balance her identities as Batgirl and Oracle. Cassandra Cain and Stephanie Brown operated together as Batgirls, while Barbara generally worked as Oracle and provided technological and strategic assistance to the Bat-Family. She nevertheless continued to take part in field operations and occasionally used the Batgirl identity. This arrangement allowed Barbara to retain both aspects of her superhero persona while emphasizing her role as a coordinator, strategist, and mentor to younger members of the Bat-Family. The Batgirls series further developed Barbara's relationship with Cassandra and Stephanie, depicting her as an important member of their support network.

=== Dawn of DC ===
During the Dawn of DC initiative, Barbara Gordon continued primarily in her role as Oracle while remaining capable of operating as Batgirl. Cassandra Cain and Stephanie Brown continued to share the Batgirl mantle, with Barbara supporting them and other members of the Bat-Family through her technological expertise and intelligence-gathering abilities. Her characterization during this period continued the balance established in Infinite Frontier: Barbara was both an active superhero and a central source of information and coordination for Gotham's vigilantes. Her history as Batgirl and Oracle remained equally important to her identity, while her relationships with Cassandra and Stephanie reinforced her role as a mentor and senior member of the Bat-Family.

== Powers and abilities ==
=== Martial artistry ===
According to the character's fictional biography, Barbara Gordon trained in Boxing, Capoeira, Judo, Kung Fu, Eskrima, Karate, Kickboxing, Jujutsu, Muay Thai, and Taekwondo earning black belts prior to her tenure as Batgirl and is described as being a "star athlete." Following the events of The Killing Joke, Barbara Gordon continued to train in martial arts as Oracle, despite being paralyzed from the waist down. She has extensive skills with eskrima fighting sticks, small firearms, and batarangs; she customarily keeps a pair of eskrima sticks stored in the armrests of her wheelchair as a contingency. In the revised continuity of The New 52, she reflects on the fact that she has been taking self-defense training since age 6 in Batgirl #0 (2012).

=== Intelligence and technological skill ===
Gordon is written as having a genius-level intellect and naturally possessing a photographic memory. She is described by Gail Simone as the most intelligent member of the Batman family and among all characters having operated out of Gotham City. Prior to the character's career as a vigilante, Barbara Gordon developed many technological skills, including vast knowledge of computers and electronics, expert skills as a hacker, and graduate training in library sciences. Like Batman, Barbara Gordon originally used a wide variety of computer electronics and gadgets during her early adventures as Batgirl. These included an infrared scanner built into the cowl of her costume, various bat-inspired weaponry, and the Batcycle. According to Gail Simone, Oracle maintains control over the 12 technologically advanced satellites that were created by Lex Luthor during his tenure as President of the United States.

=== Information broker ===
As Oracle, Barbara Gordon placed her considerable skills and knowledge at the disposal of many of the DC Universe's heroes. She is a skilled hacker, capable of retrieving and dispersing information from private satellites, military installations, government files, and the properties of Lex Luthor. Batman, himself a genius with a wide knowledge base and access to vast information resources, routinely consults Oracle for assistance. Writer and editor Dennis O'Neil, who first established Oracle as Batman's intellectual equal and source of information, stated that "[i]t was logical for her to be there in Batman's world ... Batman would need someone like that."

== Cultural impact ==
Since her debut in the DC Comics publication, and fueled by her adaptation into the Batman television series in 1967, Barbara Gordon has been listed among fictional characters that are regarded as cultural icons. Author Brian Cronin, in Was Superman A Spy?: And Other Comic Book Legends Revealed (2009) notes that following her 1967 debut, "Batgirl was soon popular enough to appear regularly over the next two decades and Yvonne Craig certainly made an impression on many viewers with her one season portraying young Ms. Gordon." Similarly, Cronin states that following the publication of The Killing Joke, Barbara Gordon—in her new persona as Oracle—became "more popular, in fact, than she was when she was Batgirl. She even gained her own title, Birds of Prey, about her and a group of superhero operatives she organizes[.]" The character has been the subject of analysis in academia, regarding the portrayal of women, librarians, and disabled people in mainstream media. Throughout the character's history, Barbara Gordon's intelligence has been one of her defining attributes. According to BusinessWeek, she is listed as one of the top ten most intelligent fictional superheroes appearing in American comics and is the only female character to appear on the list. In 2011, Barbara Gordon was ranked 17th in both IGN's "Top 100 Comic Book Heroes" and Comics Buyer's Guide's "100 Sexiest Women in Comics".

=== Feminist interpretations ===
In The Supergirls: Fashion, Feminism, Fantasy, and the History of Comic Book Heroines (2009), author Mike Madrid states that what set Barbara Gordon as Batgirl apart from other female characters was her motivation for crime-fighting. Unlike Batwoman who preceded her, "she wears his symbol on her chest, but she is not his girlfriend or faithful handmaiden." Because she does not pursue a romantic interest in Batman, "Batgirl is a female Batman can actually regard as a brilliant peer and a partner in the war on crime, the same way he would a male." Historian Peter Sanderson observed that while "Barbara Gordon initially conformed to hackneyed stereotypes as a dowdy librarian ... her transformation into Batgirl could be seen in retrospect as a symbol of the emerging female empowerment movement of the 1960s. (Moreover, by the 1970s Barbara had given herself a makeover even in her 'civilian identity and ran for Congress.)"

In the 1980s, Barbara Kesel, after writing a complaint to DC Comics over the negative portrayal of female characters, was allowed to write for Barbara Gordon in Detective Comics. Robin Anne Reid, in Women in Science Fiction and Fantasy: Overviews (2009), wrote that "Kesel's version of Batgirl established her as a character separate from Batman and Robin: a woman motivated to do what men do, but alone and in her own way. Her Secret Origins (1987) and Batgirl Special (1988) countered the victimized and objectified presentation of Barbara Gordon/Batgirl in Alan Moore's acclaimed The Killing Joke (1988)." She notes that Kesel's interpretation of the character emphasized her intelligence, technological skill, and ability to overcome fear. Commenting on Barbara Gordon's eventual evolution into Oracle, she states "[m]any readers and individuals within the industry believe that Barbara Gordon became a 'better' character after she was paralyzed, but few people comment on specifics of the event that allowed her to become that 'better' character."

In Superheroes and Superegos: Analyzing the Minds Behind the Masks (2010), author Sharon Packer wrote that "[a]nyone who feels that feminist critics overreacted to [Gordon's] accident is advised to consult the source material", calling the work "sadistic to the core." Brian Cronin noted that "[many] readers felt the violence towards Barbara Gordon was too much, and even Moore, in retrospect, has expressed his displeasure with how the story turned out." Jeffrey A. Brown, author of Dangerous Curves: Action Heroines, Gender, Fetishism, and Popular Culture (2011) noted The Killing Joke as an example of the "inherent misogyny of the male-dominated comic book industry" in light of the "relatively unequal violence [female characters] are subjected to." While male characters may be critically injured or killed, they are more than likely to be returned to their original conception, while female characters are more likely to receive permanent damage. Reid states that although speculation behind the editorial decision to allow the paralysis of the character to become permanent included the idea she had become outdated, "if audiences had grown tired of Batgirl, it was not because she was a bad character but because she had been written badly."

Despite views that present the character's Batgirl persona as a symbol of female empowerment, a long-held criticism is that she was originally conceived as an uninspired variation of Batman "rather than standing alone as a leader, such as Wonder Woman" who had no pre-existing male counterpart. In analyzing stereotypes in gender, Jackie Marsh noted that male superheroes (such as Batman) are depicted as hyper-masculine and anti-social, "while female superheroes are reduced to a childlike status by their names" such as the Batgirl character. Professor James B. South, chairman of the Department of Philosophy at Marquette University, stated that Barbara Gordon's character development as Oracle gave her a sense of independence she could not achieve as Batgirl. During her tenure as Batman's protege, "she seems to develop her own style of fighting as Batgirl, [but] she's still basically following in Batman's footsteps." Following The Killing Joke, her recreation as Oracle, and the launch of Birds of Prey, "we see Barbara Gordon as a team leader and her transformation from a girl into a woman."

=== Representation for library and information science ===
In The Image and Role of the Librarian (2002), Wendi Arant and Candace R. Benefiel argue that her portrayal as a librarian is considered to be significant to the profession, in that it is represented as a valuable and honorable career. Even because the character abandons it to run for United States Congress, Barbara Gordon is seen as being given a "career switch that even most librarians would consider a step up." In the essay "Librarians, Professionalism and Image: Stereotype and Reality" (2007), Abigail Luthmann views the character less favorably, stating that "[t]he unassuming role of librarian is used as a low-visibility disguise for her crime-fighting alter-ego, and while her information-locating skills may have been useful to her extra-curricular activities no direct examples are given." Unlike her earlier incarnation as Batgirl, "[a]s Oracle, Barbara Gordon is arguably the first true librarian-as-super-hero yet seen in a mainstream comic book (as opposed to a super-hero who happens to be a librarian in his/her private life)." Wendi Arant and Candace R. Benefiel note that Oracle exerts her influence over the DC Universe primarily from home, putting "to full use the information science skills [she] learned on her way to her PhD" In her new persona, "the physically challenged but superbly resourceful Oracle occupies a unique place in the annals of superhero-dom—the 'information goddess' as crime-stopper." Using Barbara Gordon in her role as Oracle, author Sean Wise asserts her character as a model for business networking. In How to Be a Business Superhero: Prepare for Everything, Train with the Best, Make Your Own Destiny at Work (2008) he states that "[o]ver the last decade, Oracle has shown the power of a strong network of contacts, and in doing so she shows Business Superheroes the importance of cultivating contacts and developing assets that can further their collective goals."

Over the years, the American Library Association and DC Comics have collaborated on multiple projects to promote literacy. These efforts frequently involve Barbara Gordon. In 2004, artist Gene Ha created a poster and bookmark that depicted Barbara Gordon walking in a library. Her Batgirl costume appears in a window's reflection. The tagline "Librarians are heroes every day!" appears at the bottom of the poster and bookmark. In 2009, a poster featured Barbara Gordon as the Oracle alongside Batman, Nightwing, Robin, the Cassandra Cain version of Batgirl, and Huntress. In 2015, the ALA and DC Comics collaborated on a new set of posters and bookmarks in the ALA's "READ" campaign. By herself, Barbara Gordon appears in the "Batgirl of Burnside" guise as envisioned by Babs Tarr. In another design, she appears as the Oracle alongside other members of the extended Bat Family.

The book Drawn to the Stacks: Essays on Libraries, Librarians and Archives in Comics and Graphic Novels includes the chapter "Barbara Gordon as Information Literacy Activist in Batgirl: Son of Penguin," which "argues that Gordon’s confrontation with unethical algorithms in the 2017 story arc is a crucial and deeply insightful representation of librarians as an integral part of American society and the pursuit of justice."

=== Representation for people with disabilities ===
Following the character's reinvention as the information broker Oracle, she has been regarded as a symbol of empowerment for disabled people. In Unleashing the Superhero in Us All (2008), author T. James Musler notes that "[f]or quite some time, any handicap was considered insurmountable" citing Franklin D. Roosevelt as an example, who was never photographed in a wheelchair to avoid a perception of weakness. About Barbara Gordon, he states "[r]ather than quitting crime-fighting, Barbara combines her intellect and computer skills to help the superhero community by gathering and passing along information." Her character thus signifies that "[n]o longer is a handicap overwhelming, a person can live a strong good life, handicap or not." In The Superhero Book: The Ultimate Encyclopedia Of Comic-Book Icons And Hollywood Heroes (2004), author Gina Renée Misiroglu observes that while disabled characters in comic books are typically utilized as gimmicks, or—as with Charles Xavier and Daredevil—are introduced with a pre-existing condition as part of their origin myth, "[a]s Oracle... Gordon stands tall as the most empowering disabled superhero. Readers witnessed her tragedy, and watched her rise above it." James B. South's chapter "Barbara Gordon and Moral Perfectionism" in the 2004 book Superheroes and Philosophy analyzes how the changes in her life "from librarian to Batgirl to Oracle" drive her to pursue a higher self, illustrating the philosophical theory of moral perfectionism.

== In other media ==
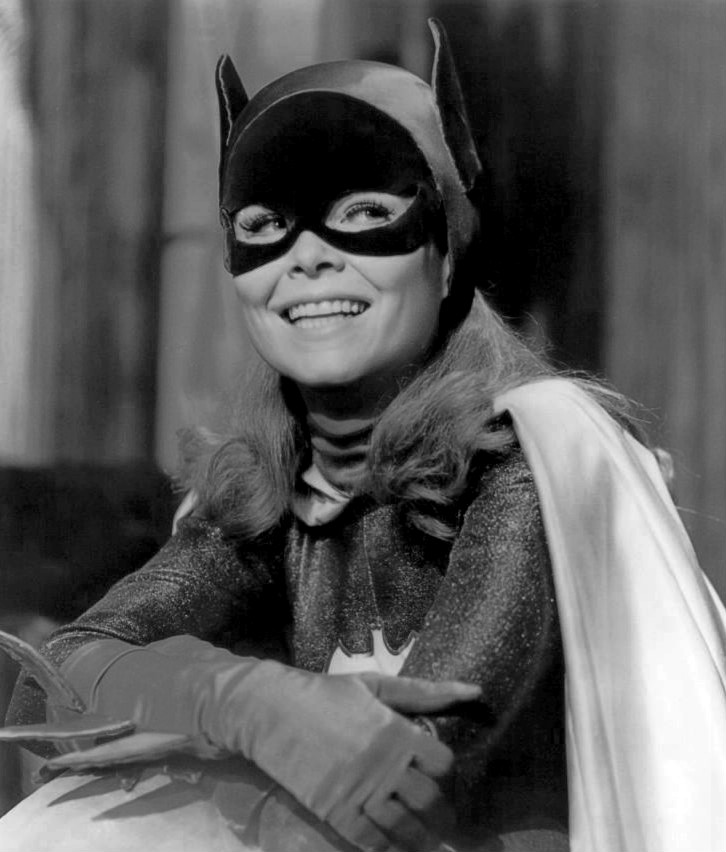
Yvonne Craig as Batgirl

After the character was introduced in Detective Comics #359 in January 1967, at the request of the producers of the 1960s Batman television series, she was introduced into the television series – portrayed by Yvonne Craig – in the season 3 premiere "Enter Batgirl, Exit Penguin", in September that same year.

Les Daniels, in Batman: The Complete History (2004), wrote that the goal of ABC was to "attract new audience members, especially idealistic young girls and less high-minded older men." According to Craig: "I used to think the reason they hired me was because they knew I could ride my own motorcycle ... I realized they hired me because I had a cartoon voice." A shared criticism of Batgirl and other female superheroes portrayed later on television (such as Wonder Woman and the Bionic Woman), is that she was not allowed to engage in hand-to-hand combat on screen. As such, "her fights were choreographed carefully to imitate the moves of a Broadway showgirl through the use of a straight kick to her opponent's face rather than the type of kick a martial artist would use." However, Craig has also stated: "I meet young women who say Batgirl was their role model ... They say it's because it was the first time they ever felt girls could do the same things guys could do, and sometimes better. I think that's lovely." During the early 1970s, Craig portrayed Batgirl once again in a public service announcement to advocate equal pay for women. Since Batman, the character has had a long history of appearances in television and other media. As Batgirl, Barbara Gordon plays a supporting role in a string of animated series, voiced by Jane Webb in The Batman/Superman Hour (1968), Melendy Britt in The New Adventures of Batman (1977), Melissa Gilbert in Batman: The Animated Series (1992), Tara Strong in The New Batman Adventures (1997) and Beware the Batman (2013), Danielle Judovits in The Batman (2004), Mae Whitman in Batman: The Brave and the Bold (2008) and Alyson Stoner in Young Justice (2011). The Batman series also showcased the character's first animated adaptation as Oracle, voiced by Kellie Martin in the episode "Artifacts" (2007). She also appears in DC Super Hero Girls voiced by Mae Whitman in season 1 as Barbara Gordon and season 2 as Batgirl. Other variations of the character that have been adapted into other media include an elderly Barbara Gordon, voiced by Stockard Channing and Angie Harmon in 1999's Batman Beyond, who after retiring as Batgirl, became commissioner of the Gotham City police department.

Dina Meyer starred as Barbara Gordon in the television series Birds of Prey (2002). It became the first adaptation to show the character's progression from Batgirl to Oracle, which included her paralysis at the hands of the Joker. Meyer commented on her character's complex history stating: "She's multidimensional. She was a former superhero. She was extremely active physically for years, fighting alongside Batman. The unfortunate incident with the Joker took away the use of her legs ... but rather than give up and throw in the towel, as she could've done so easily, she went and studied escrima (a martial art), got stronger in her mental state and, while helping out her father on a case one day, realized she had a knack for solving mysteries. And all of a sudden she became this computer genius." Overall, the series received criticism for its emphasis on aesthetics over plot. It aired for one season before receiving cancellation. In the fourth season of the TV series Arrow, after Felicity Smoak had a similar paralyzing injury, Oliver Queen gives her the codename Overwatch while commenting that "Oracle" was taken. Although in the comic books Barbara Gordon was never a member of the Teen Titans, she was slated to appear in the live-action Titans series, when originally proposed for TNT. This version of the character was to be a wheelchair-using computer expert, but not yet be known as Oracle. This series was subsequently redeveloped for DC Universe without the character. Barbara made her debut in the third season with Savannah Welch. The series depicted her as the Commissioner of the Gotham City Police Department and retired from her Batgirl persona after an attack from Mr. Freeze that resulted in the death of her father.

In addition to live-action television and animation, the character has appeared in several video games included in the Batman franchise. She appears in The Adventures of Batman & Robin, Batman: Vengeance, Batman: Rise of Sin Tzu and Batman: The Killing Joke voiced by Tara Strong. She is also in Batman: Dark Tomorrow for the first time as Oracle. She also appears in LEGO Batman for the PC, PlayStation 2, PlayStation 3, Xbox 360, Wii, DS, and PlayStation Portable. She plays a supporting role as Oracle in Batman: Arkham Asylum for the PC, PlayStation 3, and Xbox 360, serving as Batman's guide through Arkham, and is voiced by Kimberly Brooks. She also appears as the radio guide alongside Alfred Pennyworth, as they both serve as Batman's guides in the sequel, Batman: Arkham City. A teenage Barbara also appears in the prequel Batman: Arkham Origins, voiced by Kelsey Lansdowne. In the 2008 live-action film, The Dark Knight, a very young Barbara Gordon is depicted. She is credited as "Gordon's Daughter", while the name "Barbara Gordon" is reserved for Commissioner Gordon's wife. She also acts as the primary contact for hero characters as Oracle in DC Universe Online, voiced by Katherine Catmull for the PC and the PlayStation 3. She assists the player through the tutorial and will offer comments and advice throughout the game including a guided tour of the JLA Watchtower. She is a playable character in Injustice: Gods Among Us, with Kimberly Brooks reprising her role. Barbara has returned in Batman: Arkham Knight where she is voiced by Ashley Greene. In addition, Barbara also appears as a playable character as part of the game's season pass.

Barbara Gordon appears in the 2017 animated film The Lego Batman Movie voiced by Rosario Dawson. She is introduced taking over from her father Jim Gordon to become the new Police Commissioner of Gotham. This allows for the continuation of still having a 'Commissioner Gordon' and gives a more prominent role to the character. She later dons her cowl and teams up with Batman as Batgirl in addition to her role as Commissioner. In March 2017, it was announced that Joss Whedon was in talks to write, direct and produce a Batgirl film as part of the DC Extended Universe. The film would center on Barbara Gordon, with The New 52 comics by Gail Simone serving as "a starting point" for the film. Whedon was to begin production on the film in 2018, but stepped down in February 2018. In April 2018, after impressing the studio with her work on the forthcoming film Birds of Prey, Christina Hodson was hired as screenwriter for Batgirl as well. The studio was looking for a female director.

In the final season of Gotham, Barbara Lee Gordon is shown as the baby of Jim Gordon and his ex-fiancée Barbara Kean, named by the latter both after herself and after Jim's wife Dr. Lee Thompkins. Her parents share custody of her. She appears in the final episode portrayed by Jeté Laurence, where she is taken hostage as the debut action of the new Joker, Gordon's attempt to save her being assisted by the new Batman.

Barbara Gordon appears in Harley Quinn as a college student in the second-season episode "Riddle U" where she helps Harley and Poison Ivy take down the Riddler and is seen making her own Batgirl costume.

She's portrayed by Savannah Welch in the third season of the HBO Max series Titans, where she's depicted as the commissioner of the Gotham City Police.

Leslie Grace was slated to portray Barbara Gordon as Batgirl in what would have been her live-action solo film and DCEU debut, Batgirl, which was planned to premiere exclusively on HBO Max but was cancelled in August 2022.

The character also made a non-speaking animated cameo appearance in the 2021 film Space Jam: A New Legacy.

== Collected editions ==
- Showcase Presents Batgirl Vol. 1 ISBN 1-4012-1367-7; collects early Batgirl appearances (1967–1975) (release date 2007); softcover
- Batgirl: The Greatest Stories Ever Told ISBN 978-1-4012-2924-5; collects various stories from Detective Comics, Batman Family, Legends of the DC Universe, and The Batman Chronicles. (release date 2010); softcover
- Batgirl: Year One (2003) ISBN 1-4012-0080-X; collects all nine issues of the Batgirl: Year One miniseries
- Batgirl: The Darkest Reflection; collects issues #1–6 of her ongoing Batgirl series. (release date June 2012) hardcover
- Batgirl: Knightfall Descends; collects issues #7–13 and 0 of her ongoing Batgirl series. (release date Feb. 2013) hardcover
- Batman: The Cat and the Bat ISBN 978-1-4012-2496-7; collects an early Batgirl/Catwoman story from Batman Confidential #17–21. (release date 2009); softcover
- Batman: Batgirl (1997) ISBN 978-1-56389-305-6; one-shot special
- Batman: The Killing Joke (1988) ISBN 0-930289-45-5
- Batman: Thrillkiller ISBN 1-56389-424-6; collects Batgirl and Robin: Thrillkiller #1–3 and the Batgirl and Batman: Thrillkiller '62 one-shot special (1998)
- Elseworld's Finest: Supergirl & Batgirl (1998)
- Birds of Prey (1999) ISBN 1-56389-484-X
- Birds of Prey: Old Friends, New Enemies (2003) ISBN 1-56389-939-6
- Birds of Prey: Of Like Minds (2004) ISBN 1-4012-0192-X
- Birds of Prey: Sensei & Student (2005) ISBN 1-4012-0434-1
- Birds of Prey: Between Dark & Dawn (2006) ISBN 1-4012-0940-8
- Birds of Prey: The Battle Within (2006) ISBN 978-1-4012-1096-0
- Birds of Prey: Perfect Pitch (2007) ISBN 1-4012-1191-7
- Birds of Prey: Blood and Circuits (2007) ISBN 978-1-4012-1371-8
- Birds of Prey: Trouble in Mind; collects issues #1–7 of the ongoing Birds of Prey series, featuring Barbara Gordon as Batgirl (2012); softcover
- Oracle: The Cure (2010) ISBN 978-1-4012-2603-9
- Batgirl: Death of the Family; collects issues #14–19 of her ongoing Batgirl series, as well as Batgirl Annual #1, Batman #17, and a story from Young Romance #1 (release date October 2013); hardcover
- Birds of Prey: Your Kiss Might Kill; collects issues #8–13 of the ongoing Birds of Prey series, featuring Barbara Gordon as Batgirl (2013); softcover
- Batgirl: Wanted; Collects issues #20–26 of her ongoing Batgirl series as well as Batman: The Dark Knight #23.1 – Ventriloquist. (2014) hardcover
- Batgirl: Deadline; Collects issues #27–34 of her ongoing Batgirl series in addition to Batgirl Annual #2 and Batgirl: Future's End #1. (2015) hardcover
- Batgirl: The Batgirl of Burnside; Collects issues #35–40 of her ongoing Batgirl series with a story from Secret Origins #10 included as well. (June 2015) hardcover
- Birds of Prey: A Clash of Daggers; collects issues #14–17 of the ongoing Birds of Prey series, along with Batgirl Annual #1, featuring Barbara Gordon as Batgirl (December 2013); softcover
- Batgirl Vol. 8: The Joker War; collects issues #45-50 978-1779521132

== See also ==
- Librarians in popular culture
- List of fictional hackers
- Portrayal of women in comics
