= Walk the Straight and Narrow =

- Batman episode
- Episode no.: Season 2 Episode 2
- Directed by: Sherman Marks
- Written by: Stanley Ralph Ross
- Production code: 9705-Pt. 2
- Original air date: September 8, 1966

Guest appearances
- Barbara Nichols; Robert Cornthwaite; Doodles Weaver; Loren Ewing; Steve Pendleton; Lee Delano; Myrna Dell; Sam Jaffe; Special Guest Villain: Art Carney as The Archer

Episode chronology
← Previous "Shoot a Crooked Arrow"	Next → "Hot Off the Griddle"

"Walk the Straight and Narrow" is the 36th episode in the Batman television series' second season, originally airing on ABC on September 8, 1966 (the same evening which saw the debut of Star Trek on NBC) and repeated on June 1, 1967.

== Plot synopsis ==
Following the events of the previous episode, Batman and Robin are about to be impaled. They activate hidden springs in their boots, which catapult them out of harm's way. Meanwhile, the Archer (Art Carney) and his "merry malefactors" retreat to their new hideout in the basement of police headquarters. The Archer and his men then hijack an armored car carrying $10 million, which the Wayne Foundation plans to donate to the destitute residents of Gotham.

The armored car is later found abandoned with the cash left untouched, so the donation ceremony commences as planned. Alfred Pennyworth (Alan Napier), in disguise as Batman, and Robin watch from across the street as Bruce Wayne attends the ceremony. However, it's discovered that the Archer has substituted the money in the armored car for counterfeit currency. Batman deduces that Alan Dale (Robert Cornthwaite) — one of the Wayne Foundation's directors responsible for the money — is working with the Archer. The criminals plan to escape by boat to Switzerland in the international waters of the Atlantic Ocean, where the Archer and his malefactors assume they'll be protected from the law.

Batman and Robin chase the villains with the Batboat and stop the Archer, Crier Tuck (Doodles Weaver), Big John (Loren Ewing), Maid Marilyn (Barbara Nichols), and Alan A. Dale before they get the chance to escape for good. Maid Marilyn gives Batman and Robin swords with which to defend themselves. Later, Bruce, Dick, and Alfred practice archery at Wayne Manor.
