= Charles Hoffman (screenwriter) =

American screenwriter and film producer

- Born: September 28, 1911; San Francisco, California
- Died: April 8, 1972 (aged 60); Los Angeles, California

Charles Hoffman (September 28, 1911, San Francisco, California – April 8, 1972, Los Angeles, California) was a film and television writer and film producer

His writing credits include That Hagen Girl (1947), The Blue Gardenia (1953), and the 1960s television series Batman and The Green Hornet.
