= Stanford Sherman =

- Born: c.1938 Akron, Ohio, United States
- Occupations: Screenwriter, television writer

Stanford Sherman was born in Akron, Ohio and is an American film and television writer best known for such productions as Any Which Way You Can, Krull, Ice Pirates, The Man From U.N.C.L.E. and Batman. He has also written the story of the 1978 bi-lingual (English and Hindi) film Raiders of the Sacred Stone (Shalimar).
