= List of Batman (TV series) characters =

The following is an overview of the characters who appeared in the 1966–1968 live-action Batman television series.

== Recurring cast and characters ==
| Characters | Recurring cast and characters | | | |
| Characters | Batman | Batman: The Movie | Batman: Return of the Caped Crusaders | Batman vs. Two-Face |
|---|---|---|---|---|
| Characters | 1966–68 | 1966 | 2016 | 2017 |
| Bruce Wayne Batman | Adam West | Adam West | Adam West | Adam West |
| Richard "Dick" Grayson Robin | Burt Ward | Burt Ward | Burt Ward | Burt Ward |
| Alfred | Alan Napier | Alan Napier | Steven Weber | Steven Weber |
| Harriet Cooper | Madge Blake | Madge Blake | Lynne Marie Stewart | Lynne Marie Stewart |
| Commissioner Gordon | Neil Hamilton | Neil Hamilton | Jim Ward | Jim Ward |
| Chief O'Hara | Stafford Repp | Stafford Repp | Thomas Lennon | Thomas Lennon |
| The Joker | Cesar Romero | Cesar Romero | Jeff Bergman | Jeff Bergman |
| The Penguin | Burgess Meredith | Burgess Meredith | William Salyers | William Salyers |
| The Riddler | Frank Gorshin (Seasons 1 and 3) John Astin (season 2) | Frank Gorshin | Wally Wingert | Wally Wingert |
| The Catwoman | Julie Newmar (Seasons 1 and 2) Eartha Kitt (season 3) | Lee Meriwether | Julie Newmar | Julie Newmar |

== Main characters ==
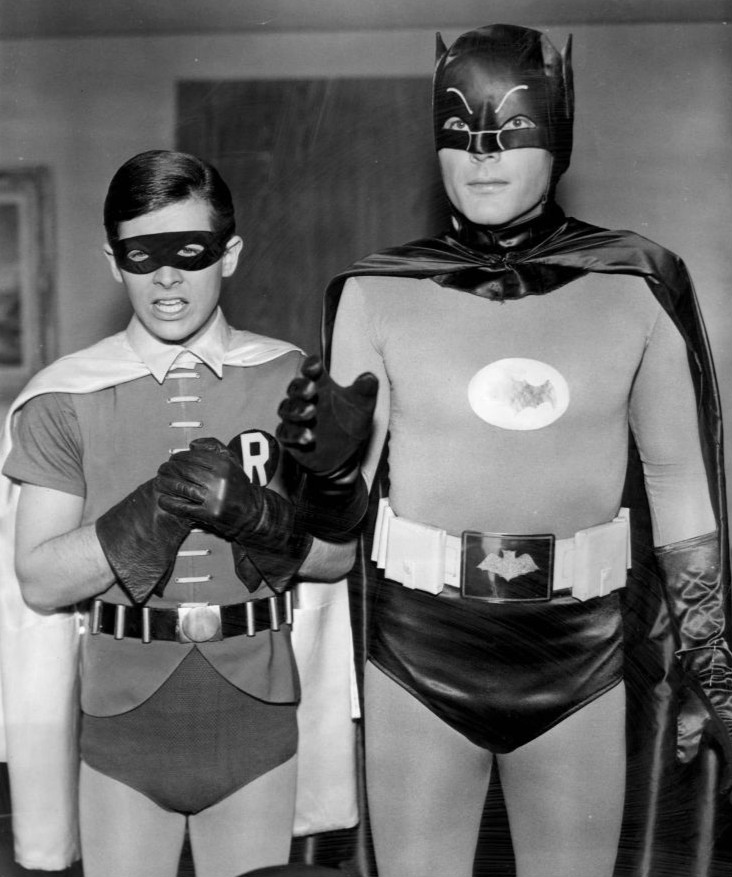
Burt Ward as Robin (left) and Adam West as Batman (right)

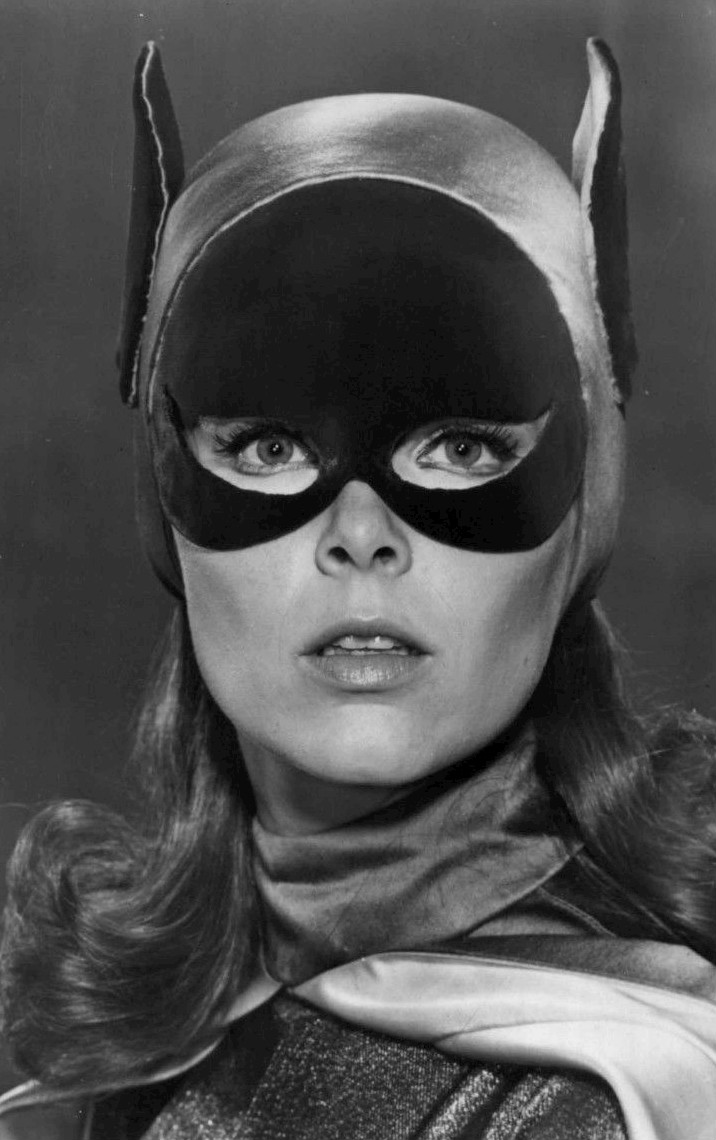
Yvonne Craig as Batgirl

| Character | Actor | Description | Episodes |
|---|---|---|---|
| Bruce Wayne/Batman | Adam West | Based on the comic book character of the same name. In the first episode, it is twice briefly mentioned that his parents were killed by criminals when he was a boy; this is mentioned once more in the episode "The Joker's Epitaph". He is presented as a well established superhero and legally deputized member of law enforcement. | All |
| Dick Grayson/Robin | Burt Ward | Based on the comic book character of the same name, no actual origin is provided for the character in the series. He is presented as well established as Bruce Wayne's ward and Batman's sidekick. | All |
| Barbara Gordon/Batgirl | Yvonne Craig | Commissioner Gordon's daughter who works at the Gotham Library, created in conjunction with the character introduced in the comic books the same year. Unlike the comic books, no actual origin is provided within the series. | 95-120 |

== Supporting characters ==
| Character | Actor | Description | Episodes |
|---|---|---|---|
| Alfred | Alan Napier | Bruce Wayne's faithful butler who is based on the comic book character of the same name. If Bruce was in occasional danger, Alfred would secretly don the Batman costume. This emergency situation occurred in some episodes. Though other versions of this character are given the surname "Pennyworth", Alfred's surname is never mentioned in this series. | 1-11, 13–15, 17–23, 25–28, 30–37, 39-71, 73–76, 78, 79, 81-92 & 94-120 |
| Commissioner Gordon | Neil Hamilton | The commissioner of the Gotham City Police Department who is based on the comic book character of the same name, though his first name is never mentioned in the series. | All |
| Chief O'Hara | Stafford Repp | The chief of police at the Gotham City Police Department who is always seen with Commissioner Gordon. Created specifically for the series, the character would later be mentioned and adapted to DC Comics publications, though the character was not given a commonly used first name on the television series. A female version of the character appeared in The Lego Batman Movie. | 1-19, 21-43 & 45-120 |
| Aunt Harriet Cooper | Madge Blake | Based on the comic book character of the same name, she is the aunt of Dick Grayson. While the character began as a regular supporting character, her appearances became less frequent during the second season and almost nonexistent in the third, being reduced to just two cameo appearances. This was due to Madge Blake's declining health. | 1-15, 17–30, 32–37, 39, 40, 43–47, 49-51, 53, 54, 56–59, 61–71, 73, 74, 76, 78, 79, 81, 83, 85, 87, 89 & 91-94 (Main); 96 & 107 (Recurring) |

=== Guest ===
| Character | Actor | Description |
|---|---|---|
| Mayor Linseed | Byron Keith | The Mayor of Gotham City. Linseed was a pun on the name of then-New York City mayor, John Lindsay; the unseen character, Governor Stonefellow, was a similar play on New York's then-governor, Nelson Rockefeller. Likewise "Hexagon" was mentioned as the military headquarters of the United States, a play on Pentagon. |
| Warden Crichton | David Lewis | The Warden of Gotham City Penitentiary. |
| Britt Reid a.k.a. The Green Hornet | Van Williams | Based on the radio character of the same name, he appeared in a "crossover" from the production company's second comic book-themed series The Green Hornet. |
| Kato | Bruce Lee | Based on the radio character of the same name, he appeared as the Green Hornet's sidekick. |

== Antagonist characters ==
=== Recurring ===
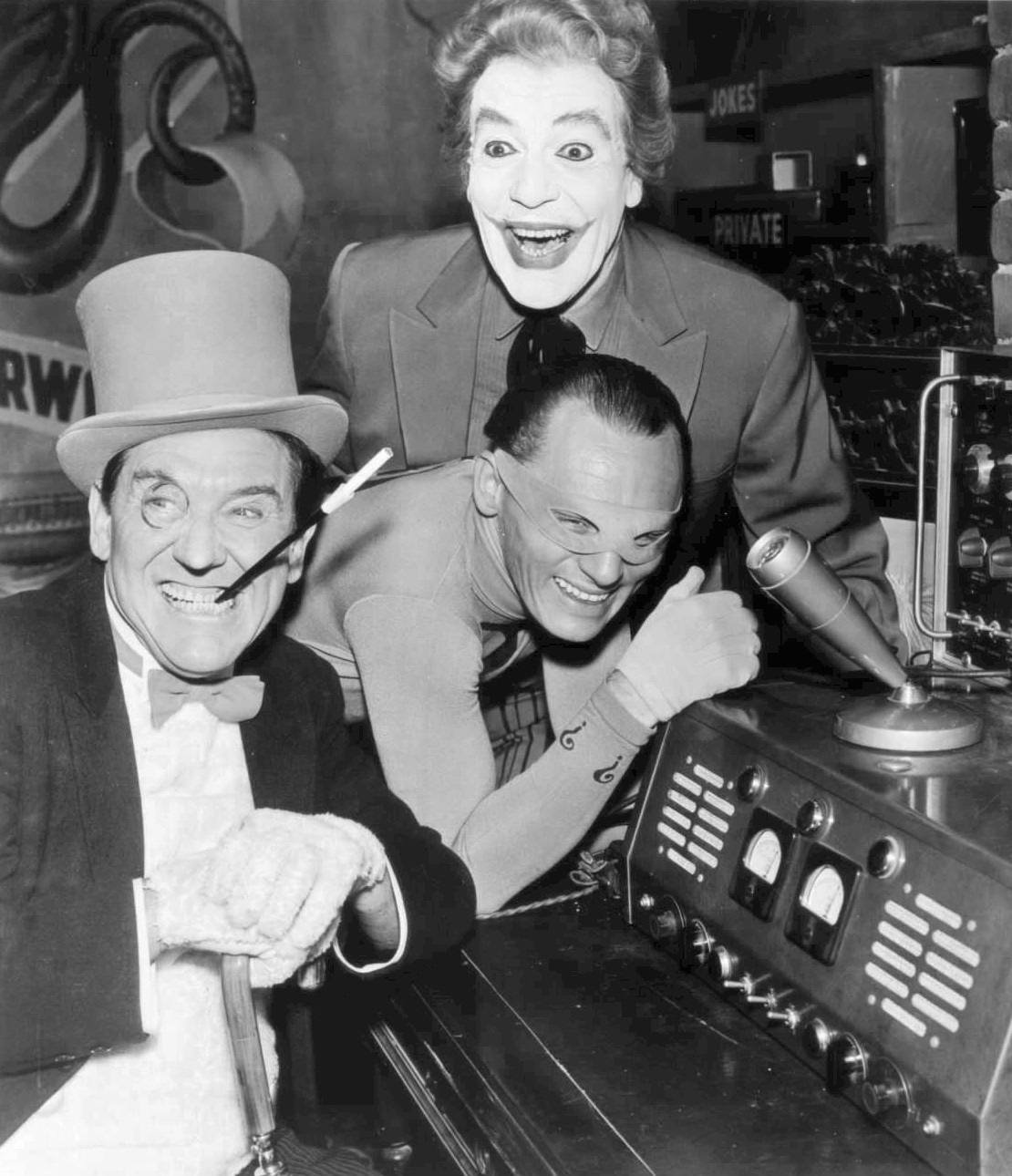
Burgess Meredith as The Penguin (left), Frank Gorshin as The Riddler (center), and Cesar Romero as The Joker (top)

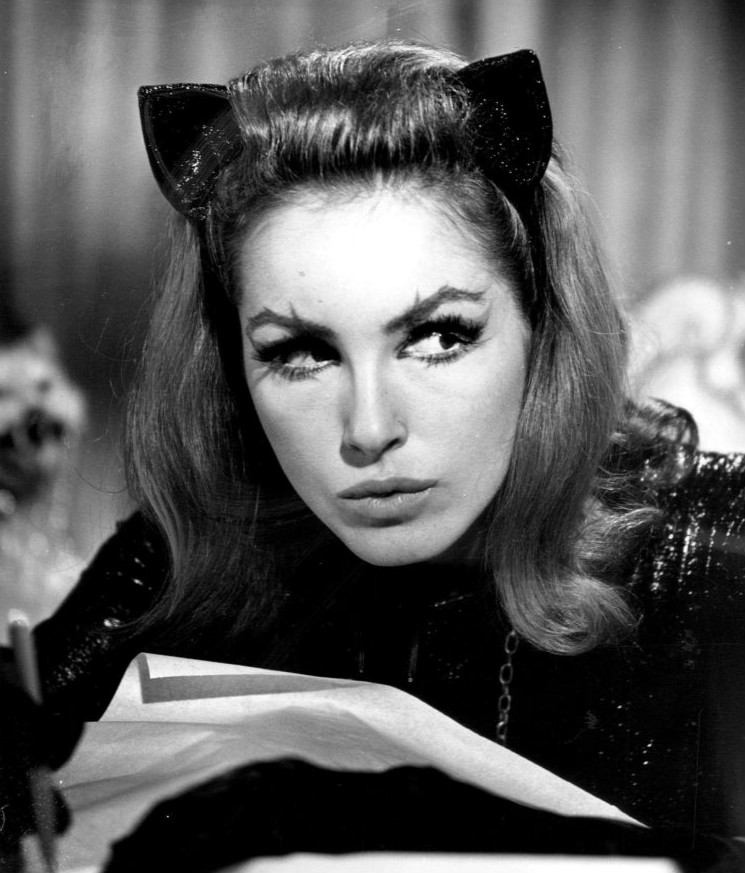
Julie Newmar as The Catwoman from the show, in 1966

| Character | Actor | Description | Episode Appearances |
|---|---|---|---|
| The Catwoman | Julie Newmar; (seasons 1 & 2); Lee Meriwether; (film); Eartha Kitt; (season 3) | Based on the comic book character of the same name, no origin for the character is provided within the series. Meriwether was cast for the film role when producers learned that Newmar would not be available for filming due to a back injury. | 19, 20, 37, 38, 44 (cameo), 63, 64, 67, 68, 74, 75, 83, 84, 107 (cameo), 108, 109 (cameo), 110, 111 & 119 (cameo) |
| Egghead | Vincent Price | Egghead was created specifically for the series and is presented as a master criminal with a fixation on eggs. In his plan to have Chief Screaming Chicken and the Mohicans regain Gotham City, Egghead was served by Benedict and Foo Yung (portrayed by Gene Dynarski and Ben Welden) as well as his secretary Miss Bacon (portrayed by Gail Hire). In season three, Egghead collaborated with Olga, Queen of Cossacks. Egghead made his first comic appearance in Batman: Shadow of the Bat. Egghead, among other characters created for the series, was adapted for the animated series Batman: The Brave and the Bold, appearing in the episode "Day of the Dark Knight!". | 47, 48, 101 (cameo), 102, 103, 108 (cameo), 109 & 119 (cameo) |
| The Joker | Cesar Romero | Based on the comic book character of the same name, no origin for the character is provided within the series. Since Cesar Romero refused to shave his trademark mustache, his white pancake makeup was applied over it, but it was still visible in many screen close-ups. | 5, 6, 15, 16, 25, 26, 55, 56, 71–73, 81, 82, 91, 92, 103 (cameo), 104, 109 (cameo), 110, 111, 117 (cameo), 118 & 119 (cameo) |
| Professor William McElroy a.k.a. King Tut | Victor Buono | King Tut was created specifically for the series and was provided with an origin story. Within the episodes, Professor William McElroy is an Egyptologist at Yale University. He suffers a blow to the head during a student riot that results in amnesia. His subconscious creates a new personality as the reincarnation of King Tut. Each time he is struck on the head, his personalities reverse. His simple hired thugs were referred to as "Tutlings" (portrayed by various actors). In his first attempt to take over Gotham City, King Tut was assisted by Nefertiti (portrayed by Ziva Rodann), Grand Vizier (portrayed by Frank Christi), and Scrivener (portrayed by Don "Red" Barry). In his plot involving mind-control scarabs, King Tut was assisted by Cleo Patrick (portrayed by Marianna Hill), Royal Apothecary (portrayed by Sid Haig), Royal Lapidary (portrayed by Peter Makimos), Sethos (portrayed by Boyd Santell), and Amenophis Twofik (portrayed by Michael Pataki). When it came to him kidnapping Lisa Carson to be his queen, King Tut was assisted by Neila (portrayed by Grace Lee Whitney), Royal Jester (portrayed by Tim O'Kelly), Lord Chancellor (portrayed by Lloyd Haynes), and Fouad Sphinx (portrayed by Richard Bakalyan). Like King Tut, Royal Jester and Lord Chancellor were Yale University students who were also hit in the head by the same bunch of falling flower pots that fell on Professor McElroy. In his crime-predicting scheme, King Tut was assisted by Shirley (portrayed by Patti Gilbert), Nubis (portrayed by Larry Doran), Osiris (portrayed by James Gammon), and Sulieman the Great (portrayed by Joe E. Tata). In his plan to tunnel under Wayne Manor, King Tut was assisted by Florence of Arabia (portrayed by Victoria Vetri), Manny the Mesopotamian (portrayed by Henry Youngman), and H.L. Hunter (portrayed by Jock Mahoney). According to Batman Forever and Batman & Robin director Joel Schumacher, King Tut was one of the lead choices considered by Mark Protosevich to be the main antagonist of his cancelled fifth Batman film Batman Unchained, along with Egghead, the Mad Hatter and the Scarecrow. King Tut, among others created for the series, was adapted for the 2009 episode "Day of the Dark Knight!" of the animated television series Batman: The Brave and the Bold, voiced by John DiMaggio. Due to FOX holding the rights to the King Tut name, the character was renamed "the Pharaoh". Later that year, the character was adapted to the comics under the name Victor Goodman. In the 2016 film Batman: Return of the Caped Crusaders, King Tut is released from prison thanks to Robin and Catwoman along other villains, and he along his friends later help them to defeat Batman (under the control of Catwoman's kiss) and his Batmen. The character also had a minor role in the 2017 film The Lego Batman Movie as one of the many villains who helped the Joker during his heists. | 27, 28, 41, 42, 87, 88, 99 (cameo), 100, 116 (cameo), 117 & 119 (cameo) |
| Louie the Lilac | Milton Berle | Louie was created specifically for the series and was presented as a gangster using a flower motif. He is a gangster who plotted to take over the minds of Gotham City's "flower generation" with help from his female assistant Lila (portrayed by Lisa Seagram) and his henchmen Acacia (portrayed by Karl Lucas), Arbutus (portrayed by Richard Bakalyan), Azalea, and Petunia. In his second appearance, Louie plotted to corner the perfume market with help from perfume expert Lotus (portrayed by Nobu McCarthy) and henchmen Saffron (portrayed by John Dennis) and Sassafras (portrayed by Ronald Knight) that also involved kidnapping Bruce Wayne and Dick Grayson even after the latter found some ambergris on the beach. As Bruce is an international sportsman and authority on animals, Louie wants him to work on extracting the scent pouches of the Abyssinian civet cats, the castor follicles of the beavers, the tonquin of the musk deer, and the glands of muskrats for Lotus to use with the ambergris after Saffron and Sassafras abducted the animals in question from the Gotham City Zoo. Louie the Lilac, among other characters created for the series, appeared in Batman: The Brave and the Bold. | 100 (cameo), 101, 111 (cameo) & 112 |
| Jervis Tetch a.k.a. The Mad Hatter | David Wayne | Based on the comic book character of the same name, no origin for the character is provided within the series. This version was based on the Impostor Mad Hatter. In Batman '66, it is revealed that the Clock King is the Mad Hatter's brother Morris Tetch. | 13, 14, 69 & 70 |
| Marsha, Queen of Diamonds | Carolyn Jones | Marsha was created specifically for the series. When originally introduced, she plots to gain access to the diamond that powers the Batcomputer. Marsha usually works with her Aunt Hilda (portrayed by Estelle Winwood), a chemistry teacher who thinks she's a witch. She later collaborated with the Penguin in a movie plot. Marsha, Queen of Diamonds, among other characters created for the series, appeared in Batman: The Brave and the Bold. | 57, 58 & 76-78 |
| Dr. Art Schivel a.k.a. Mr. Freeze | George Sanders; (episodes 6-8); Otto Preminger; (episodes 53 and 54); Eli Wallach; (episodes 93 and 94) | Based on the comic book character originally known as Mr. Zero but later changed to match the new name from the show, an abbreviated origin for the character is provided within the series. What is related is that Batman had accidentally spilled cryonic chemical on him during a previous arrest. This renders him incapable of living in temperatures above −50 °F. | 6 (cameo), 7, 8, 53, 54, 93 & 94 |
| The Penguin | Burgess Meredith | Based on the comic book character of the same name, no origin for the character is provided within the series. The Penguin quickly became a very popular archvillain, so much that the show's producers always had a script ready for Burgess Meredith whenever he was available. | 3, 4, 21, 22, 33, 34, 51, 52, 61, 62, 71, 73, 76–78, 95, 97 (cameo), 98, 99, 113 (cameo), 114 & 119 (cameo) |
| Olga, Queen of Cossacks | Anne Baxter | Olga was created specifically for the series. She is the leader of a group of Cossacks who are all exiles of Bessarovia. Olga used to be a dishwasher at a restaurant, before she was found by her later fiancée, Egghead. Both of them worked together to pull off a variety of schemes. This was the second villainess that Baxter portrayed on the series. | 101 (cameo), 102, 103, 108 (cameo) & 109 |
| The Riddler | Frank Gorshin (seasons 1 & 3); John Astin (season 2) | Based on the comic book character of the same name, no origin for the character is provided within the series. Leading into the production of the second season, Gorshin held out for higher wages. This resulted in the writers putting off Riddler-themed episodes until the issue was resolved. Late in the production, they reworked one script to use the Puzzler and finally produced a Riddler story for which John Astin was cast. The issue was resolved before the third season, with Gorshin returning to the role one last time. | 1, 2, 11, 12, 23, 24, 31, 32, 79, 80, 95 (cameo), 96 & 119 (cameo) |
| Shame | Cliff Robertson | Shame was created specifically for the series. The cowboy motif was patterned as a parody of the film Shane. His partners in crime included henchman Messy James (portrayed by Timothy Scott), whose name was a parody of Jesse James; Rip Snorting (portrayed by John Mitchum), used car salesman Laughing Leo (portrayed by Milton Frome), and now ex-girlfriend, Okie Annie (portrayed by Joan Staley), whose name was a parody of Annie Oakley. His second partners in crime include fiancée Calamity Jan (portrayed by Dina Merrill), whose name was a parody of Calamity Jane; Jan's mother Frontier Fanny (portrayed by Hermione Baddeley), Mexican-British man Fred (portrayed by Barry Dennen), and a Native American named Chief Standing Pat (portrayed by Victor Lundin). Shame, among other characters created for the series, appeared in Batman: The Brave and the Bold. | 59, 60, 114 (cameo), 115 & 116 |

=== Guest ===
| Character | Actor | Description | Episode appearances |
|---|---|---|---|
| The Archer | Art Carney | By company records, the Archer was created specifically for the series by writer Stanley Ralph Ross and not related to the previous comic book character of the same name. The character is presented as a skewed version of Robin Hood, with his group reflecting the Merry Men motif and consisting of female assistant Maid Marilyn (portrayed by Barbara Nichols) and henchmen Big John (portrayed by Loren Ewing), Crier Tuck (portrayed by Doodles Weaver), Allan A. Dale (portrayed by Robert Cornthwaite), and an assortment of poor people (portrayed by various actors). The Archer, among other characters created for the series, appeared in Batman: The Brave and the Bold. | 35 & 36 |
| The Black Widow | Tallulah Bankhead | An original character created for the series, Black Widow is an elderly bank robber who uses a spider motif where her henchmen were named after different types of spiders like Tarantula (portrayed by Don "Red" Barry), Daddy Longlegs (portrayed by Mike Lane), and Trap Door (portrayed by Al Ferrera). No actual origin is provided in the series. The Black Widow, among other characters created for the series, appeared in Batman: The Brave and the Bold. | 89 & 90 |
| The Bookworm | Roddy McDowall | An original character created for the series, Bookworm bases his crimes on books and literary tropes. His moll is Lydia Limpet (portrayed by Francine York) and his henchmen are based on different things associated with books like Pressman (portrayed by Tony Aiello), Printer's Devil (portrayed by John Crawford), Typesetter (portrayed by Jan Peters), and Worm (portrayed by Roydon Clark). The Bookworm, among other characters created for the series, appeared in Batman: The Brave and the Bold. Bookworm appeared in Batman vs. Two-Face, voiced by Jeff Bergman. McDowall would later narrate the audiobook edition of the 1989 film and provide the voice of the Mad Hatter on Batman: The Animated Series. | 29 & 30 |
| Chandell and Harry | Liberace | An original character created for the series, Chandell is a pianist who is blackmailed into a life of crime as the criminal Fingers by his twin brother Harry upon Chandell using a player piano in his White House performance after he hurt his hands. Harry's henchmen consist of the Piano Movers (portrayed by various actors) and both of them have female associates named Doe (portrayed by Marilyn Hanold), Rae (portrayed by Edy Williams), and Mimi (portrayed by Sivi Abert). Harry is also served by his lawyer Alfred Slye (James Millhollin). | 49 & 50 |
| Nora Clavicle | Barbara Rush | Nora Clavicle was created specifically for the series. She is presented as a women's rights activist who attempts to destroy Gotham City in order to collect on an insurance policy she had taken out on it. She and her henchwomen Evelina (portrayed by June Wilkinson) and Angelina (portrayed by Inga Nielsen) manipulated Mayor Linseed's wife Millie in order to have the mayor replace Commissioner Gordon with her and all the male police officers with women. Nora was supposed to make an appearance in Batman '66, with artist Scott Kowalchuk creating concept art for a redesigned version of the character and developed plans for a future storyline in which she was going to be retconned to have secretly been Talia al Ghul all along. These plans never came to fruition due to the comic series was cancelled and ended with issue 30 in February 2016. | 112 (cameo) and 113 |
| The Clock King | Walter Slezak | Based on the comic book character of the same name, no origin for the character is provided within the series. His female assistant is Millie Second (portrayed by Eileen O'Neill) and his henchmen are Second Hand Three (portrayed by Michael Pate) and Second Hand Five (portrayed by Charlie Picerni). In Batman '66, he is revealed to be the Mad Hatter's brother Morris Tetch. | 45 & 46 |
| Basil Karlo a.k.a. False Face | Malachi Throne | Based on the Silver Age version of the comic book character of the same name, no origin for the character is provided within the series. His female assistant was Blaze (portrayed by Myrna Fahey) and his henchmen are Burns (portrayed by Billy Curtis), Brinks (portrayed by Joe Brooks), Pinkerton (portrayed by Chuck Fox), Hugh, and Little Tom. In Batman '66, False Face's true identity is Basil Karlo, where the issue that revealed this identity had him becoming that comic series' version of Clayface. False Face, resembling the Batman incarnation of the character, appears in Batman: The Brave and the Bold, voiced by Corey Burton. | 17 & 18 |
| Lord Marmaduke Ffogg | Rudy Vallee | Ffogg was created specifically for the series. He is presented as an upper-class member of Londinium society who runs a school for thieves disguised as a girls' finishing school and uses homemade fog to cover up his crimes. Often assisting him in his criminal doings was his sister Lady Penelope Peasoup (portrayed by Glynis Johns), his daughter Prudence (portrayed by Lyn Peters), his butler Basil (portrayed by Monte Landis), his chauffeur Digby (portrayed by Larry Anthony), and his footman Scudder (portrayed by Harvey Jason) as well as their students Duchess Sheila (portrayed by Nanette Turner), Kit (portrayed by Lynley Johnson), Daisy (portrayed by Aleta Rotell), and Rosamond (portrayed by Stacy Gregg). | 104 (cameo) and 105-107 |
| Perry Rose a.k.a. Colonel Gumm | Roger C. Carmel | Gumm was created specifically for the series. He is presented as a stamp factory foreman who is using the company to produce forged stamps in the episodes featuring the Green Hornet and Kato. Batman didn't know about Gumm's illegal activities until Green Hornet and Kato showed up in Gotham City. His henchmen are Block (portrayed by Alex Rocco), Cancelled (portrayed by Seymour Cassell), and Reprint (portrayed by Rico Cattani). | 85 & 86 |
| Lulu Schultz a.k.a. Lola Lasagne | Ethel Merman | Lola Lasagne was created specifically for the series. She is presented as a childhood friend of the Penguin who owns a racehorse, the only thing her ex-husband Luigi left her when he disappeared. The pair use the horse in a racing scam. She and the Penguin had Visor (portrayed by Joe Brooks) and Armband (portrayed by Lewis Charles) as their mutual henchmen. | 97 (cameo), 98 & 99 |
| Ma Parker | Shelley Winters | Ma Parker was created specifically for the series. She is presented as an elderly woman and master criminal who runs a gang consisting of her and her children Pretty Boy Parker (portrayed by Robert Belheller), Machine Gun Parker (portrayed by Peter Brooks), Mad Dog Parker (portrayed by Michael Vanderver), and Legs Parker (portrayed by Tisha Sterling). She allows herself to be captured so that she can take over Gotham State Penitentiary and form a gang from its inmates. Her name is a play on the infamous criminal Ma Barker, whom Winters herself later played in the film Bloody Mama. Ma Parker, among other characters created for the series, appeared in Batman: The Brave and the Bold. | 43 & 44 |
| Minerva | Zsa Zsa Gabor | Minerva was created specifically for the series. She is introduced as a spa owner catering to Gotham City's wealthy. Minerva uses a modified hair dryer to scan her client's minds to find out where they hide their fortunes with help from her henchmen Aphrodite (portrayed by Yvonne Arnett), Adonis (portrayed by William Smith), Apollo (portrayed by Mark Bailey), and Atlas (portrayed by Al Ferrera). | 119 (cameo) and 120 |
| The Minstrel | Van Johnson | The Minstrel was created specifically for the series and was presented as a genius in the field of electrical engineering and styled himself as a medieval troubadour. His group consists of Octavia (portrayed by Leslie Perkins), Treble (portrayed by Remo Pisani), Bass (portrayed by Norman Gabrowski), Mellow, and Dulcet. | 39 & 40 |
| Pussycat | Lesley Gore | A henchwoman of the Catwoman, she is a rock singer with a crush on Robin. The Catwoman manipulates Pussycat into turning Robin against Batman involving her Cataphrenic drug. | 74 & 75 |
| The Puzzler | Maurice Evans | Based on the comic book character of the same name, no origin for the character is provided within the series. He attempts to steal the "Retsoor", a supersonic plane owned by Artemis Knab. He is assisted by Rocket O'Rourke (portrayed by Barbara Stuart), Blimpy (portrayed by Robert Miller Driscoll), Glider (portrayed by Allan Emerson), and Ramjet (portrayed by Jay Della). The season two episodes where the Puzzler appeared were originally written for the Riddler and were going to be called "A Penny For Your Riddles" and "They're Worth A Lot More". Due to Frank Gorshin holding out over salary issues and no longer wanting to play the Riddler, the scripts were re-written and Evans cast in the role. | 65 & 66 |
| Dr. Somnambula a.k.a. The Sandman | Michael Rennie | This version of the Sandman was created specifically for the series and is unrelated to the Golden Age comic book character of the same name. Presented as an international criminal who uses hypnotic sand to control sleepwalkers, he partners with the Catwoman and uses the alias Doctor Somnambula in an attempt to steal J. Pauline Spaghetti's fortune. Sandman's henchmen are Nap (portrayed by Tony Ballen) and Snooze (portrayed by Richard Peel). | 67 & 68 |
| Lorelei Circe a.k.a. The Siren | Joan Collins | The Siren was created specifically for the series. She is presented as Lorelei Circe, a chanteuse who is able to sing notes so high that they place men under her control. While briefly helping out Riddler, Siren went on to her own plan to deal with Batman that involved controlling Commissioner Gordon. She was assisted in that plot by Allegro (portrayed by Mike Mazurki) and Andante (portrayed by Cliff Osmond). Despite only appearing in a few episodes in the original series, Siren was given a bigger role in Batman '66, the comic book continuation of the series. The Siren, among other characters created for the series, appeared in Batman: The Brave and the Bold. | 96 & 97 |
| Dr. Cassandra Spellcraft | Ida Lupino | Dr. Cassandra Spellcraft was created specifically for the series. She is presented as a world-famous alchemist, occultist, and criminal who is seeking to do things that her fore-mothers have failed at. Making use of camouflage pills, Dr. Spellcraft and her husband Cabala (portrayed by Howard Duff) planned to take over Gotham City that involved springing Joker, Penguin, Riddler, Catwoman, King Tut, and Egghead (all portrayed by uncredited stand-ins) from Gotham State Penitentiary so that they can do heists in exchange for 50% of the profits. Dr. Cassandra Spellcraft and Cabala were originally planned to appear in Batman '66 where they would appear as members of the League of Shadows, but the comic series was cancelled before those plans can come into fruition. | 118 (cameo) and 119 |
| Zelda the Great | Anne Baxter | Zelda was created specifically for the series. She is shown to be a world-famous magician and escape artist who once a year pulls off a major robbery to pay Eivol Ekdol for the equipment she uses in her act. This was the first villainess that Baxter portrayed on the series. | 9 & 10 |

== "Batclimb" cameos ==
Aside from the super-criminals, another coveted spot was the Batclimb Cameo. In 14 episodes of the first two seasons and the 1966 film, a window would be opened by a celebrity for a short conversation as the Dynamic Duo scaled a building using Batarangs and Bat-ropes. The scenes were actually filmed on a horizontal surface with the camera rotated by 90 degrees to give the illusion that the Duo were on a vertical wall. Their capes were held up by strings (usually off-camera, but on occasion visible). The Batclimb cameo scenes were discontinued for the third season.

- Jerry Lewis – appeared in "The Bookworm Turns" (April 20, 1966).
- George Cisar – drunkard (in the theatrical feature released July 30, 1966).
- Dick Clark – appeared in "Shoot a Crooked Arrow" (September 7, 1966).
- Van Williams and Bruce Lee as Green Hornet and Kato – Appeared in "The Spell of Tut" (September 28, 1966).
- Sammy Davis Jr. – appeared in "The Clock King's Crazy Crimes" (October 12, 1966).
- Bill Dana as José Jiménez from The Bill Dana Show – appeared in "The Yegg Foes in Gotham" (October 20, 1966).
- Howard Duff as Sam Stone from Felony Squad – appeared in "The Impractical Joker" (November 16, 1966).
- Werner Klemperer as Colonel Klink from Hogan's Heroes – appeared in "It's How You Play the Game" (December 1, 1966).
- Ted Cassidy as Lurch from The Addams Family – appeared in "The Penguin's Nest" (December 7, 1966).
- Don Ho – appeared in "The Bat's Kow Tow" (December 15, 1966).
- Andy Devine as Santa Claus – appeared in "The Duo is Slumming" (December 22, 1966).
- Art Linkletter – appeared in "Catwoman Goes to College" (February 22, 1967).
- Edward G. Robinson – appeared in "Batman's Satisfaction" (March 2, 1967).
- Suzy Knickerbocker (pen name of Aileen Mehle) – appeared in "King Tut's Coup" (March 8, 1967).
- Cyril Lord as the Carpet King – appeared in "Ice Spy" (March 29, 1967).
