= Egghead (DC Comics) =

Fictional DC comics character

- Egghead as he appears in the comics. Art by Norm Breyfogle.

Publication information
- First appearance: Batman "An Egg Grows in Gotham" (October 19, 1966)
- First comic appearance: Batman: Shadow of the Bat #3 (August 1992)
- Created by: Alan Grant; Norm Breyfogle

In-story information
- Full name: Edgar Heed
- Abilities: Deductive reasoning; Egg-themed weapons

Egghead (Edgar Heed) is a fictional character created for the 1960s Batman television series. Played by Vincent Price, the character is identifiable by his pale bald head and white and yellow suit. He believes himself to be "the world's smartest criminal", and his crimes usually have an egg motif to them; he also includes egg-related puns in his speech and uses various egg-themed weapons. Additionally, Egghead used deductive reasoning to deduce Batman's secret identity.

== Background ==
Egghead was one of several characters created specifically for the TV series, alongside King Tut, Shame, the Siren, Chandell, and the Bookworm. Egghead would go on to appear in Batman comic books and other media, just as Harley Quinn first appeared in Batman: The Animated Series before being introduced to the comics.

There had been several minor characters known as Egghead, but they were bald secondary gangsters who had little to do with the TV series character. The first, spelled Egg-Head, was an associate, along with bespectacled Fish-Eyes, of jewel thief Michael Baffle in Detective Comics #63 (May 1942). Another Egghead was in Mike Optik's gang in "Dick Grayson, Telegraph Boy!" in Batman #22 (April-May 1944). He was not very intelligent, and Professor Hendricks tricked him into thinking he was on a rocket in outer space to get him to reveal the location of Optik's hideout.

Marvel Comics' Egghead debuted in December 1962's Tales to Astonish #38.

== Fictional character biography ==
=== Batman (1966) ===
Egghead as portrayed by Vincent Price.

Introduced in the consecutive second-season episodes "An Egg Grows in Gotham" and "The Yegg Foes in Gotham", Egghead joins forces with Chief Screaming Chicken (Edward Everett Horton) of the Mohican Indian tribe to return control of Gotham City to the chief's people in exchange for being allowed to govern the city and let the criminal underworld run amok, only to be foiled by Batman and Robin.

In the third season, Egghead is joined by his new partner and love interest Olga, Queen of the Cossacks (Anne Baxter), as they attempt to hatch an egg containing a Neosaurus and feed Robin and Batgirl to it and steal the Sword of Bulbul and the Egg of Ogg, only to be foiled by Batman on both occasions. In "The Entrancing Dr. Cassandra", the titular Cassandra Spellcraft and her husband Cabala free Egghead, among other criminals, from prison to help them take over Gotham, giving them camouflage pills to better facilitate their crime spree and promising Egghead control of Gotham's poultry farms.

=== Comics ===
Egghead first comic appearance was an unnamed cameo in Batman: Shadow of the Bat #3-4. He appears as an inmate of Arkham Asylum before he is freed by Jeremiah Arkham and fights Batman.

Egghead's first named appearance was in the 2010 issue Batman: The Brave and the Bold #16. Here he has teamed up with an egg-shaped villain named Ygg'Phu Soggoth. This comic is the first to give Egghead the name Edgar Heed.

Professor Egghead appears in Gotham Academy #14.

== In other media ==
=== Television ===
- Egghead makes a non-speaking cameo appearance in Batman: The Brave and the Bold episode "Day of the Dark Knight!" as an inmate of Blackgate Penitentiary.
- A portrait of Egghead appears in the Harley Quinn episode "Catwoman".
- Egghead appears in the Batwheels episode "A T-Rexcellent Adventure", voiced by Maurice LaMarche.
- Egghead appears in the Teen Titans Go! episode "O.S.H.A.", voiced by David Kaye.

=== Film ===
- Egghead, among other villains, was considered by Mark Protosevich to appear in the unproduced film Batman Unchained.
- Egghead makes a non-speaking cameo appearance in Batman: Return of the Caped Crusaders.
- Egghead makes a non-speaking cameo appearance in The Lego Batman Movie as one of several villains assisting in the Joker's attack on Gotham.
- Egghead makes a non-speaking cameo appearance in Batman vs. Two-Face as one of Hugo Strange and Harleen Quinzel's patients.

=== Video games ===
Egghead makes a cameo appearance as a non-player character (NPC) in Lego Batman: Legacy of the Dark Knight.

=== Miscellaneous ===
- Egghead makes a minor appearance in Holy Musical B@man!.
- The Batman: The Brave and the Bold incarnation of Egghead appears in issue #16 of Batman: The Brave and the Bold.
- Egghead appears in issue #3 of Batman '66 as an inmate of Arkham Asylum. Additionally, in a later one-shot, he is revealed to be Universo's ancestor.
- Egghead appears in the DC-Spotify podcast story: The Riddler: Secrets of the Dark.

== See also ==
- List of Batman family enemies
