= Return to the Batcave: The Misadventures of Adam and Burt =

2003 American television film by Paul A. Kaufman

- DVD cover
- Written by: Duane Poole
- Directed by: Paul A. Kaufman
- Starring: Adam West; Burt Ward; Jack Brewer; Jason Marsden
- Music by: Douglas J. Cuomo
- Country of origin: United States
- Original language: English

Production
- Executive producers: Dawn Wells; Larry Germain
- Producer: Michael Gallant
- Cinematography: James Glennon
- Editor: Casey O. Rohrs
- Running time: 90 minutes
- Production companies: Artisan Entertainment; Fox Television Studios; The Kaufman Company; DC Entertainment

Original release
- Network: CBS
- Release: March 9, 2003

Return to the Batcave: The Misadventures of Adam and Burt is a 2003 American made-for-television biographical action-comedy film based on the 1966–1968 Batman television series which features the original stars Adam West and Burt Ward as themselves, with Jack Brewer and Jason Marsden portraying the young West (Batman) and Ward (Robin) in flashbacks. It was broadcast on CBS on March 9, 2003.

== Plot ==
Adam West prepares to attend a gala-style charity event targeted towards orphans, featuring a variety of classic cars, including the original Batmobile from Batman. Adam's butler, Jerry (whom Adam refers to as "Alfred"), arranges the event and reunites Adam with his former co-star, Burt Ward.

While at the gala, Adam reveals to Burt that he had kept the key to the original Batmobile during the show's original run. As he showcases the key, the lights mysteriously go out, and when they turn back on, both Adam's key and the Batmobile itself are gone. Outside, a valet informs them that the thief had been asking for directions to "the highway to Arizona". Though Burt is reluctant to follow the perpetrators, Adam manages to coerce him into going on a road-trip in pursuit of the Batmobile.

Prompted by a riddle left at the gala, Adam and Burt reminisce along the way about their life before the show. Burt recalls a time when he was homeless, living under the Miami pier and collecting bottles for a living, before he managed to catch his big break after a successful audition as Robin. Adam, on the other hand, remembers how he had to compete against Lyle Waggoner for the role of Batman, only narrowly acquiring the part after the studio executives agreed he had a better jawline.

At the Arizona border, Adam and Burt come to realize there is a bar located scant blocks away from the site of the charity event named "The Highway to Arizona", and retrace their route. At the bar, as Burt steps away to visit the restroom, Adam finds himself momentarily seduced by a mysterious woman who reminds him of "someone I can't quite put my finger on", only for her to vanish moments later. After Burt returns, Adam hears their suspect running out of the bar. They attempt to follow but are confronted by a group of apparent henchmen, and a brawl ensues. Their attackers defeated, the duo leaves the bar to find their car being towed. Instead of a parking ticket, however, they are given a movie ticket to a screening of Batman: The Movie.

Adam and Burt notice during the film that all footage of Batman and Robin has been cut, instead featuring only the villains. During the screening, Burt recalls an incident in which television censors began to criticize the tightness of his Robin briefs, forcing him to take temporary shrinkage pills (implied to be hormone therapy) to decrease his genital size during shooting. At the same time, Adam deals with the painful memories of his divorce and ostracization from his children.

After the screening, the duo follows an oil slick to a nearby diner, but finds no leads. After Burt and Adam recall a temporary on-set rivalry between them, a crazed fan who nearly killed Burt after a one-night stand, and a ridiculous outburst from method actor Vincent Price during his time as Egghead, a Batman fan that Adam had signed the breasts of years earlier (with a permanent marker that, fittingly, never washed off) arrives to tell them the location of the Batmobile.

Upon arrival at the Batmobile, the duo enters but finds it booby-trapped. Sedated and piloted remotely to the original Batcave set, Jerry reveals himself to be the thief and, in an odd turn of events, pulls off his mask to reveal himself to be Frank Gorshin, the actor who played the Riddler. Frank restrains Adam and Burt and reveals that, years earlier, he had stolen the set blueprints of the Batman series in his plan for revenge against the hero actors getting more recognition than those who played the villains. Adam realizes the woman from earlier was none other than Julie Newmar, who then reveals herself to be working as Frank's accomplice.

Strapped to an armed bomb, Adam tricks Frank into ejecting himself from the Batmobile and onto a ledge, before cutting his and Burt's restraints off with a prop Batarang he was gifted years earlier. Now free, the duo escape the cave just before it detonates (although Burt does suffer some burns), before calling the police to arrest Frank Gorshin and Julie Newmar.

Days later, Burt and Adam attend the re-opening of the classic car event for orphans. The lights vanish once more, and the Batmobile is gone. Adam rushes off to find the perpetrators, whilst accompanied by the classic Batman theme, with a more enthusiastic Burt running by his side.

== Casting ==
Apart from West and Ward, a number of actors from the original series also appeared in the film. This includes Frank Gorshin, who played the Riddler, Julie Newmar, who played Catwoman for the first two seasons of the show, and Lee Meriwether, who played Catwoman in the Batman theatrical film. Gorshin and Newmar appear as themselves, while Meriwether appears as a waitress.

Due to licensing problems involving the original TV series, the makers of this film were only allowed to use footage from the 1966 Batman feature film. As a result, Lee Meriwether's rendition of Catwoman is the only one seen in archive footage in this film (even during a musical sequence intended to pay tribute to Newmar). Zambia-born actress Julia Rose plays the young Julie Newmar and is seen briefly in the Catwoman costume.

Jason Marsden, who plays the young Burt Ward/Robin, has done a few voice roles in DC/Warner Bros Cartoons such as Batman Beyond, Justice League Unlimited, and Young Justice.

Lyle Waggoner, who originally auditioned for the part of Batman, and Betty White both have cameos in the movie. Some of Waggoner's actual audition tape footage can be seen in the film. Waggoner ended up landing a role in another DC Comics' TV series: he played Steve Trevor on Wonder Woman in the 1970s alongside Lynda Carter as the title character. Adam West's daughter, Nina West, also has a cameo as a psychotic actress who tries to kill Burt Ward after a one-night stand. This incident is mentioned in Ward's autobiography, My Life in Tights. During the original series, of the four main supervillains (Joker, Riddler, Penguin, and Catwoman), only the Riddler never entered the Batcave set; in the movie, the Riddler finally does enter the Batcave.

== Cast ==
- Adam West as himself
  - Jack Brewer as Young Adam West / Batman
- Burt Ward as himself
  - Jason Marsden as Young Burt Ward / Robin
- Lyle Waggoner as himself / narrator
- Frank Gorshin as himself
  - Brett Rickaby as Young Frank Gorshin / Riddler
- Julie Newmar as herself / Arizona Bar Owner
  - Julia Rose as Young Julie Newmar / Catwoman
- Lee Meriwether as Waitress in Diner
- Betty White as Woman in Window during Batclimb Sequence
- Amy Acker as Bonnie Lindsey
- Curtis Armstrong as Jerry the Butler
- Jim Jansen as William Dozier
- Stacy Kamano as Nghara Frisbie-West
- Ray Buktenica as Robert Butler
- Steve Vinovich as Bartender
- Andy Umberger as Sam Strangis (assistant director)
- Joel Swetow as Casting Director
- Nina West as Burt's One Night Stand
- Darla Haun as Charity Event Host
- Erin Carufel as Yvonne Craig / Batgirl
- Nikki Ziering as Lucy
- Quinn K. Redeker as Vincent Price / Egghead
- Tony Tanner as Burgess Meredith / Penguin
  - Burgess Meredith as Penguin (uncredited / archive footage from the 1966 film)
- Bud Watson as Cesar Romero / Joker
  - Cesar Romero as Joker (uncredited / archive footage from the 1966 film)
- Christopher Darga as Adam West's Agent Lou
- Ivar Brogger as Doctor
- Silas Cooper as Wardrobe Man
- Todd Merrill as Network Executive
- John E. Goetz as Valet parker
- Elisa Marchhand as Fem fatale
- Rory Thost as Hunter
- Talt Ruppert as Publicist
- Ben Perkins as Fan boy
- Kelli King as Joneli
- Heidi Androl as Sexy fan
- Traci L. Crouch as Secretary
- Frank Addela as Robin stuntman
- Steve Bialock as Batman stuntman
- Bobby Porter as Henchman – Big Joe
- Scott L. Schwartz as Henchman – Curly
- Carl Ciarfalio as Henchman – Slim
- Anthony G. Schmidt as Henchman – Pretty Boy
- Brian Shakti as Delivery boy
- Zack Milan as Mysterious Stranger (uncredited)
- Chris Dawson as Reporter (uncredited)
- Bryan Hanna as Director / Cameraman (uncredited)
- Paul A. Kaufman as Network Executive #2 (uncredited)

== Home media ==
Return to the Batcave was released on DVD on May 17, 2005, by Anchor Bay Entertainment.
