= Sirena Irwin =

American voice director, casting director and actress

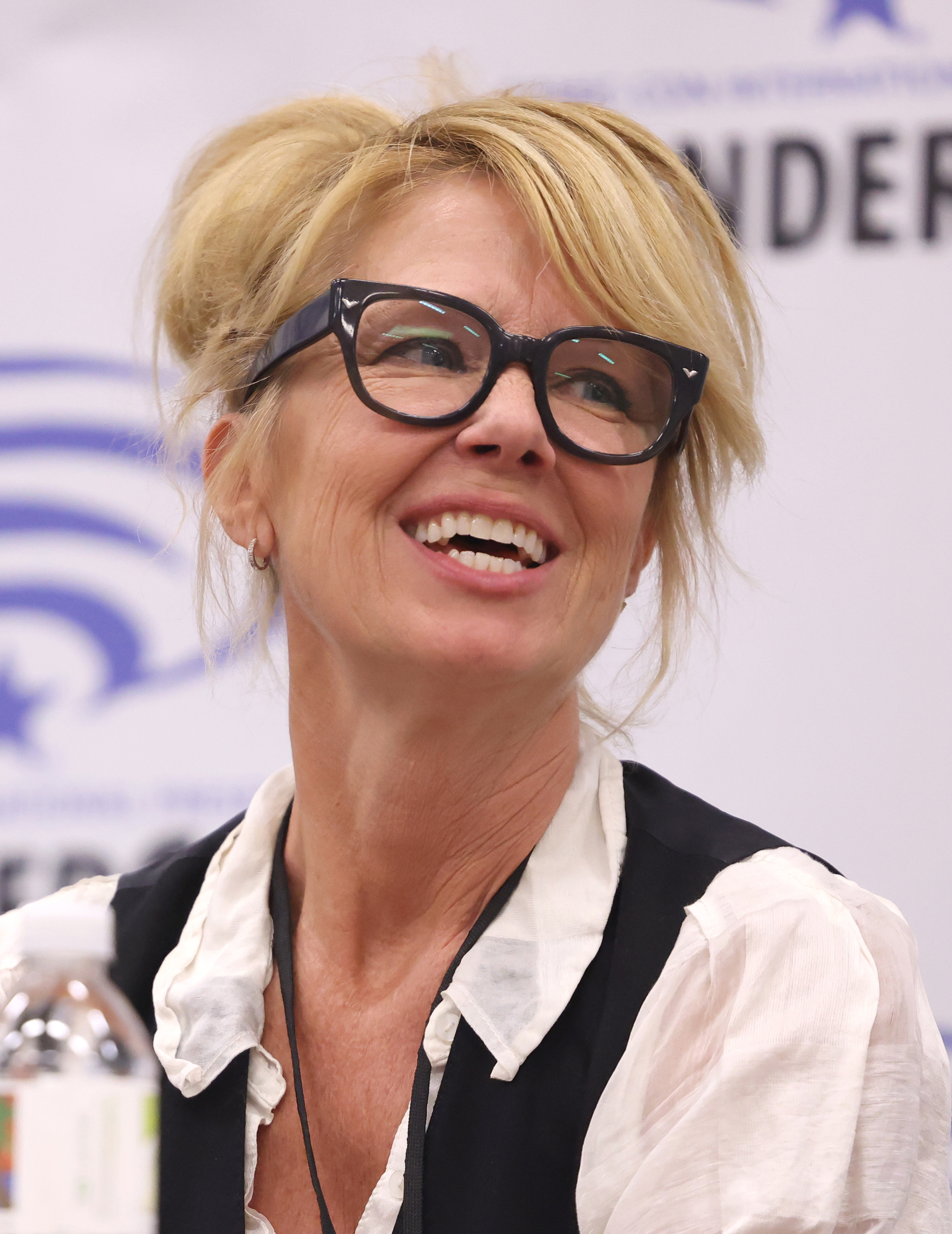
- Irwin in 2025
- Born: Gresham, Oregon, U.S.
- Occupations: Voice director; casting director; actress
- Years active: 1997–present

Sirena Irwin is an American voice director, casting director, and actress. Her career in animation casting and directing began in 2017 after a career as an actress in animation and a two-year mentorship with Voice director, Andrea Romano. Her voice directing credits include the DreamWorks Animation series Jurassic World: Camp Cretaceous, the Nickelodeon series Baby Shark's Big Show! and the Cartoon Network series Apple & Onion. She got her B.A. from San Francisco State University in 1993.

As an actress, Irwin has voiced characters for animated series including the Nickelodeon television series SpongeBob SquarePants, its spinoff series Kamp Koral: SpongeBob's Under Years, Warner Bros. television series Batman: The Brave and the Bold, and DreamWorks Animation television series The Mighty Ones. She won a Broadway World Award for Best Actor in a Touring Production for her role as Lucy Ricardo in "I Love Lucy: Live on Stage".

Irwin founded Oh, Zeus!.

== Filmography ==
=== Television ===
List of performances on television
Year	Title	Role	Episodes
1998	Alright Already	Candy	Episode: "Again with the Hockey Player: Part 1"
1998	Ellen	Cherry-O	Episode: "Vows"
1999–present	SpongeBob SquarePants	Margaret SquarePants, Lady Upturn, Mama Krabs, Squidette, Annette, Lady Fish, Female Fish #3, Woman Fish #1, Woman Fish #2, Little Girl Fish	Voice, recurring role
2003–2004	Stripperella	Persephone, Queen Clitorus, Sorority Girl, Doris, Woman	Voice, 11 episodes
2004	Significant Others	Popper	Episode: "The Right House, the Wrong Gender & a Turn"
2004	The Drew Carey Show	Raven	Episode: "Assault with a Lovely Weapon"
2005–2006	O'Grady	Jasmine	3 episodes
2006	So Notorious	Cheryl - Tori's Publicist	Episode: "Charitable"
2007	Entourage	Frida	Episode: "The First Cut Is the Deepest"
2009–2012	Winx Club	Sibylla	Voice, 3 episodes
2010–2011	Batman: The Brave and the Bold	Mera, Lois Lane	Voice, 3 episodes
2011, 2016	Butter Face	Victoria	2 episodes
2015	Social Medium	Kimberly Duncan	Episode: "Monster in the Machine"
2016–2017	Pig Goat Banana Cricket	Tina Towel, Banana's Sisters, Banana's Mom, Knife Head, Elephant, Bank Teller, Shlaverne Difozifini, Statue of Liberty	Voice, 4 episodes
2016, 2018	The Loud House	Mrs. DiMartino, Dr. Jelson	Voice, 2 episodes
2016–2018	Blaze and the Monster Machines	Gorilla, Bam, Firefly Mom, Lady Caterpillar, Silkworm, Traffic Beetle	Voice, 7 episodes
2020	The Mighty Ones	The Queen	Voice, episode: "The Queen"
2020	Stillwater	Dottie, Odette, Fish	3 episodes
2021	Kamp Koral: SpongeBob's Under Years	Missy Upturn, Mohawk Girl, Girl Camper, Anchovies	Voice, 3 episodes
2022	We Baby Bears	Mayor Centipede, Baba Yaga House	Voice, 2 episodes
2025	Jurassic World: Chaos Theory	Sirena	Voice, episode: "Fare Well"

=== Film ===
List of performances in film
Year	Title	Role	Notes
1999	The Sky Is Falling	Gabby	
1999	Can I Be Your Bratwurst, Please?	Masseuse	Short
2002	The Trip	Beverly	
2004	Whacked	Ruth	Direct-to-video
2004	The SpongeBob SquarePants Movie	Driver, Ice Cream Lady	Voice
2006	National Lampoon Presents Electric Apricot	Photographer	
2006	Holly Hobbie and Friends: Christmas Wishes	Mrs. Palmer	Voice, direct-to-video
2007	I-Nasty	Mom, Dispatcher	Short
2008	Argentoesque	Jess	Short
2009	Tales from the Catholic Church of Elvis!	Crazy Burger Lady	
2010	Everything But Me	Jeanine	Short
2012	The Longer Day of Happiness	Alisa	
2012	Il Controllore	Woman	Short
2013	Superman: Unbound	Alura	Voice, direct-to-video
2013	Planes	Actress	Voice
2014	Vitaminamulch: Air Spectacular	Additional Voices	Short
2014	Radio Zed: Hey You	Jenna	Direct-to-video
2014	Radio Zed: Humor of the Situation (2014)	Jenna	Direct-to-video
2014	Radio Zed: 99 Problems (2014)	Jenna	Direct-to-video
2015	Justice League: Throne of Atlantis	Queen Atlanna	Voice, direct-to-video
2015	The SpongeBob Movie: Sponge Out of Water	Computer Voice, Shocked Mob Member	Voice
2016	Batman: Return of the Caped Crusaders	Miranda Monroe	Voice, direct-to-video
2017	How to Make Crushed Grapes	Ashley Cheevers	Short
2017	Batman vs. Two-Face	Dr. Quinzel	Voice, direct-to-video
2018	Old-ish-er	Tandalea	Short

=== Video games ===
List of performances in video games
Year	Title	Role
2004	World of Warcraft	Actress
2007	Unreal Tournament III	Lauren
2008	Endwar	Actress
2011	Resistance 3	Ingrid, Dixie
2014	World of Warcraft: Warlords of Draenor	Actress
2016	World of Warcraft: Legion	Actress
2018	World of Warcraft: Battle for Azeroth	Actress
2023	SpongeBob SquarePants: The Cosmic Shake	Madame Kassandra, Twitchy the Witch
2025	SpongeBob SquarePants: Titans of the Tide	Madame Kassandra, Slappy, Old Lady

=== Crew ===
List of works as member of the crew
Year	Title	Credited As	Notes
2002	'Twas	Co-Producer	Short
2004	Whacked	Director, producer, writer	Short
2008	Argentoesque	Director, producer, writer	Short
2011, 2016	Butter Face	Director, producer, writer	2 episodes
2012	Il Controllore	Director, executive producer, writer, editor	Short
2018	The Adventures of Puss in Boots	Additional Voice Director	5 episodes
2018	Voltron: Legendary Defender	Voice Director, Additional Voice Director	29 episodes
2018–2019	Niko and the Sword of Light	Casting Director, Voice Director, ADR Voice Director	10 episodes
2019	She-Ra and the Princesses of Power	Voice Director	2 episodes
2019—2021	Apple & Onion	Casting Director; Recording Director; Voice Director	86 episodes
2020	Kipo and the Age of Wonderbeasts	Voice Director	9 episodes
2020–2021	Cleopatra in Space	Voice Director	
2020–2021	The Mighty Ones	Voice Director	Seasons 1–2
2020–2022	Jurassic World: Camp Cretaceous	Voice Director	
2020–2025	Baby Shark's Big Show!	Voice Director	
2021–2023	The Croods: Family Tree	Voice Director	
2024–2025	Jurassic World: Chaos Theory	Voice Director	
TBA	The Messy Adventures of Mud	Director, producer, writer	Short
