= Batwheels =

Animated superhero children's series

- Promotional poster
- Genre: Preschool; Action-adventure; Comedy; Superhero
- Based on: Batman by: Bob Kane; Bill Finger
- Developed by: Michael G. Stern
- Voices of: Jacob Bertrand; Jordan C. Reed; Titus Blake; Crew Kingston Miskel; Madigan Kacmar; Noah Bentley; Lilimar; Kimberly D. Brooks; Mick Wingert; Ethan Hawke; A.J. Hudson; Leah Lewis
- Theme music composer: Andy Sturmer
- Composer: Alex Geringas
- Country of origin: United States
- Original language: English
- No. of seasons: 3
- No. of episodes: 102

Production
- Executive producers: Michael G. Stern; Simon J. Smith; Sam Register
- Producers: Steven Fink; Caroline Kermel
- Running time: 11 minutes
- Production companies: DC Entertainment; Warner Bros. Animation

Original release
- Network: Cartoon Network
- Release: September 17, 2022 – present

Batwheels is an American animated superhero children's television series that premiered on September 17, 2022, on HBO Max. The series follows the eponymous team, a group of vehicles owned by DC Comics superhero Batman that are brought to life. It made its linear premiere on October 17, 2022, on Cartoon Network's preschool block Cartoonito. A second season premiered on January 12, 2024, on Max. In October 2024, the series was renewed for a third season, which premiered on December 5, 2025, on HBO Max. A fourth season will premiere on November 27, 2026, on HBO Max. The first two seasons are also available on Netflix.

== Plot ==
The Bat-Family's vehicles are brought to life by the Batcomputer to form the "Batwheels", a team led by the Batmobile or "Bam", to fight crime in Gotham City.

== Characters ==
=== The Batwheels ===
- The Batmobile / Bam (voiced by Jacob Bertrand), is the leader of the Batwheels. Its appearance is mostly based on the 1989 Batman batmobile with some small differences.
- Redbird / Red (voiced by Jordan C. Reed in Season 1, Titus Blake in early Season 2 and Crew Kingston Miskel in late Season 2–present), Robin's car and the youngest of the Batwheels
- Batgirl Cycle / Bibi (voiced by Madigan Kacmar), Batgirl's small but impulsive motorcycle
- Bat Truck / Buff (voiced by Noah Bentley), a gold-hearted monster truck who serves as the Batwheels' muscle
- The Batwing / Wing (voiced by Lilimar), Batman's sophisticated and confident supersonic jet
- The Batcomputer / BC (voiced by Kimberly D. Brooks), the team's trainer, supervisor, dispatcher, and mother figure
- M.O.E. (voiced by Mick Wingert), short for Mobile Operation Expert, M.O.E. is Batman's kind-hearted yet sarcastic robot mechanic

=== The Bat-Family ===
- Bruce Wayne / Batman (voiced by Ethan Hawke), a vigilante operating in Gotham City and father figure to the Batwheels Hawke previously turned down the role for Joel Schumacher's Batman Forever.
- Duke Thomas / Robin (voiced by A.J. Hudson), a mystery-loving member of the Bat-Family who wants to prove himself in the eyes of Batman
- Cassandra Cain / Batgirl (voiced by Leah Lewis), a daredevil tech-savvy member of the Bat-Family, who serves as a "big sister" figure in the group
- Dick Grayson / Nightwing (voiced by Zachary Gordon), a superhero who used to fight crime with Batman but currently fights crime in different cities
- Alfred Pennyworth (voiced by Alfred Molina), Batman's loyal butler and the builder of M.O.E.

=== The Legion of Zoom ===
- Badcomputer (voiced by SungWon Cho), an A.I. computer software inside a scoreboard and temporarily in a television who wants to replace the Bat Computer as the most powerful computer on Earth
- Crash (voiced by Tom Kenny), Badcomputer's crash-dummy like robot minion
- Prank (voiced by Griffin Burns), Joker's funny and pranking van
- Jestah (voiced by Alexandra Novelle), Harley Quinn's fun-loving ATV
- Ducky (voiced by Ariyan Kassam), Penguin's mischief-causing duck on a boat with wheels vehicle
- Quizz (voiced by Josey Montana McCoy), Riddler's quiz-loving helicopter and the youngest of the Zoomers
- Snowy (voiced by Xolo Maridueña), Mr. Freeze's bad but gentle snow crawler who is also Buff's friend

=== The Rogues' Gallery ===
- The Joker (voiced by Mick Wingert), Batman's archenemy and the self-proclaimed "Clown Prince of Crime"
- Harley Quinn (voiced by Chandni Parekh), Joker's partner-in-crime and girlfriend
- The Penguin (voiced by Jess Harnell), an elegant penguin-like criminal
- The Riddler (voiced by SungWon Cho), a riddle-obsessed criminal
- Mr. Freeze (voiced by Regi Davis), an ice-themed supervillain with a mechanical suit
- Catwoman (voiced by Gina Rodriguez), a cat-themed burglar
- Poison Ivy (voiced by Kailey Snider), a plant-themed villain
- Toyman (voiced by James Arnold Taylor), a toy-themed villain who is also an enemy of Superman
- Egghead (voiced by Maurice LaMarche), an egg-themed villain.
- Clayface (voiced by Chad Kroeger), a metahuman who possesses a clay-like body.
- Condiment King (voiced by Mick Wingert), a supervillain who uses condiments as weapons.
- Music Meister (voiced by Andy Sturmer), a music-themed villain who talks in songs.
- King Tut (voiced by Wayne Knight), an Egyptologist at Yale University who is convinced that he is a reincarnation of the Pharaoh Tutankhamun.
- Croc (voiced by Diedrich Bader), a crocodile-themed villain.
- Clock King (voiced by Mick Wingert), a time-themed villain.

=== The Gotham Guardians ===
- Kitty (voiced by Kinza Khan), Catwoman's playful cat car
- Goldie (voiced by Chandni Parekh), Green Arrow's kindhearted arrowplane who is Batwing's flying friend
- Nightbike (voiced by Nick Fisher), Nightwing's Brooklyn-accented motorcycle
- Grundy (voiced by Fred Tatasciore), a dump truck-styled monster truck based on Solomon Grundy

=== Other Heroes ===
- Oliver Queen / Green Arrow (voiced by MacLeod Andrews), a vigilante archer from Star City and one of Batman's Justice League team-mates.
- John Stewart / Green Lantern (voiced by Todd Williams), one of Batman's Justice League team-mates that currently serves within the Green Lantern Corps.
- Ray Palmer / The Atom (voiced by Dee Bradley Baker), one of Batman's Justice League team-mates that can shrink in sub-atomic size.
- Zatanna Zatara (voiced by Kari Wahlgren), a famous stage magician and one of Batman's Justice League team-mates.
- Arthur Curry / Aquaman (voiced by John DiMaggio), one of Batman's Justice League team-mates and the ruler of the undersea kingdom of Atlantis.
- Barry Allen / The Flash (voiced by Chad Kroeger), one of Batman's Justice League team-mates who runs at superspeed.

=== Minor ===
- A.D.A.M (voiced by Adam West with archived dialogue), Batman's early Batmobile. His design and character are based on the Batmobile and Batman from the 1966 Batman series.
- Banebuggy (voiced by Nick Fisher), a miniature assault vehicle who can turn into a giant size by consuming grow gas, based on Bane.
- Voice Box (voiced by Mick Wingert), Music Meister's tour bus.
- The Tumbler (voiced by Diedrich Bader), Batman's specialized extreme terrain armored interceptor. He is based on the vehicle and its corresponding version of Batman from The Dark Knight film trilogy.
- Presto (voiced by Kailey Snider), Zatanna's magic car.
- Dent (voiced by Sam Witwer), a dual colored car with a split-personality, based on Two-Face.
- Scarecrow (voiced by Tom Kenny), an orange warlock-like tractor with crow minions (or, as he calls them, his "crow-nies") with a penchant for scaring others, based on Jonathan Crane's alter ego of the same name.

== Episodes ==
Season	Episodes	Originally released	
Season	Episodes	First released	Last released
1	37	September 17, 2022	November 10, 2023
2	37	January 12, 2024	December 13, 2024
3	28	December 5, 2025	November 6, 2026
Shorts	24	September 5, 2022	December 5, 2023

=== Season 1 (2022–23) ===
All episodes were directed by Antoine Charreyron.

No. overall	No. in season	Title	Written by	Original release date	Max release date	Prod. code	U.S. viewers (millions)
1	1	"Secret Origin of the Batwheels"	Michael G. Stern	October 15, 2022	September 17, 2022	101	0.10
After Batman, Robin, and Batgirl foil a group villain robbery effort, the three heroes are taken away in a limousine. Unfortunately, this leaves them unavailable to deal with a break-in at the Batcave forcing M.O.E. and the Batcomputer to take drastic measures.
2	2	"Stop that ducky!"	Michael G. Stern	October 17, 2022	October 18, 2022	102	N/A
A disastrous attempt at stopping Ducky leads to the Batwheels nominating Bam as team leader, but his failed attempts to use Batman's leadership style make him realize that some things only work when done in a more personalized method.
3	3	"Buff's bff"	Craig Fernandez	October 17, 2022	October 18, 2022	103	N/A
A mission to catch Mr. Freeze results in Buff befriending the villain's vehicle, Snowy, and the pair quickly hit it off. However, the other Batwheels are skeptical about the Zoomer's good side, and the Bat Truck has to teach his teammates that even criminals can be good at heart.
4	4	"Up In the air"	Patrick Rieger	October 17, 2022	October 18, 2022	104	N/A
The Penguin hijacks every television channel to broadcast his own show, but a bad decision resulting in Wing crash-landing and Batman getting captured causes Bam to lose confidence in himself.
5	5	"Bibi's Do-Over"	Sarah Eisenberg & Becky Wangberg	October 17, 2022	October 18, 2022	105	N/A
After a slip-up during a mission to catch Toyman, Bibi becomes dead set on perfecting her jump, but she eventually learns that it doesn't matter if she looks bad as long as the mission at hand is accomplished.
6	6	"Sidekicked to the Curb"	Michael G. Stern	October 17, 2022	October 18, 2022	106	N/A
Disappointed in being left behind, Redbird tails Bam as he takes Batman and Robin to apprehend the Joker and Prank, with both learning that even great heroes need a partner at their side.
7	7	"Keep Calm and Roll On"	Michael G. Stern	October 17, 2022	October 18, 2022	107	N/A
Bibi's temper gets the better of her when Jestah and Harley mock her capabilities, causing her to lose control. With the help of the others, she learns that the best thing to do is to keep calm and take a deep breath under stress.
8	8	"Bam's Upgrade"	Michael G. Stern	October 17, 2022	October 18, 2022	108	N/A
Fed up with being overshadowed by the others on mission outings, Bam has himself upgraded to convince Batman to take him out, but the upgrades prove to hamper their mission of catching Toyman.
9	9	"Redbird's Bogus Beach Day"	Sarah Eisenberg & Becky Wangberg	November 7, 2022	November 8, 2022	109	N/A
A trip to the beach gets interrupted when the Joker sets out to turn off the lighthouse light and crash a ship, forcing Batman, Robin, Bam, and Redbird to take action.
10	10	"Cave Sweet Cave"	Craig Fernandez	November 7, 2022	November 8, 2022	110	N/A
After a large Joker water balloon ends up flooding the Batcave, the Batwheels are forced to temporarily stay at a parking garage until it dries out, a situation which none of them are happy with.
11	11	"Scaredy-Bat"	Andrew Guastaferro	November 14, 2022	November 8, 2022	111	N/A
Bam has to learn to take the high road after Prank continues goading him into reckless actions, before things take a turn for the worse.
12	12	"Riddle me this"	Ryan Toyama	November 14, 2022	November 8, 2022	112	N/A
With Quiz up to no good, the other Batwheels have to find him and stop his plan, but Redbird's inability to speak up for himself ends up putting the entire mission at risk.
13	13	"Zoomsday"	Ryan Toyama	November 21, 2022	November 22, 2022 (Note: This episode was originally released on November 8, 2022, but was removed shortly thereafter.)	113	N/A
Having had enough of losing to the Batwheels, the Legion of Zoom decides to try the one tactic that leaves the Batwheels victorious every time: teamwork.
14	14	"Rev and Let Rev"	Janae Hall	November 21, 2022	November 22, 2022	114	N/A
Feeling left out that he can't rev his engine as loud as the others, Redbird asks for the removal of his stealth tech, but his new noisy engine ends up foiling Robin's efforts to catch Catwoman.
15	15	"Batcomputer for a Day"	Patrick Rieger	November 28, 2022	November 29, 2022	115	N/A
While the Batcomputer recharges, the other Batwheels find that operating the Batcave is much harder than she makes it look, which becomes problematic when they have to help Batman catch Harley Quinn.
16	16	"Grass is greener"	Patrick Rieger	November 28, 2022	November 29, 2022	116	N/A
When Bam brings M.O.E. out on his night patrol, the pair find themselves dealing with Poison Ivy's rampaging plants, and M.O.E. finds fieldwork to be far out of his league.
17	17	"Holidays on Ice"	Scott Gray	December 5, 2022	December 6, 2022	117	N/A
Frustrated with the other Batwheels getting distracted by the holidays, Batwing decides to go solo to catch Mr. Freeze, but quickly comes to miss the companionship of the others.
18	18	"Bam's Clawful Mistake"	Sarah Eisenberg & Becky Wangberg	May 1, 2023	May 2, 2023	118	0.06
Wanting to even out the teams for his newly invented ball game, Bam convinces M.O.E. to bring Catwoman's car to life. Unfortunately, the newcomer quickly becomes a handful.
19	19	"Harley Did It"	Scott Gray	May 1, 2023	May 2, 2023	119	0.07
A robbery with Harley Quinn as the main suspect comes under scrutiny when Bibi and Redbird find clues that don't correlate to her at all, and the pair set out to find the real culprit of the crime.
20	20	"Buff In a China Shop"	Craig Carlisle	May 1, 2023	May 2, 2023	120	0.07
Self-conscious about his tendency to accidentally break everything, Buff begins taking measures to improve his gracefulness so he can help Batman stop the Riddler.
21	21	"A Tale of Two Bibis"	Craig Fernandez	May 1, 2023	May 2, 2023	121	N/A
Bibi ends up in a tight spot due to her impulsive nature and has to think things through when Jestah disguises herself as her to infiltrate the Batcave and steal the Batcomputer's Bat-Motherboard.
22	22	"Batty Race"	Andrew Guastaferro	May 1, 2023	May 2, 2023	122	0.07
The Gotham Grand Prix ends up having both the Batwheels and the Legion of Zoom as participants after the latter sabotage the original racers, but their cheating ways prove to be difficult obstacles to overcome.
23	23	"When You're a Jet"	Sarah Eisenberg & Becky Wangberg	July 3, 2023	July 4, 2023	123	N/A
Green Arrow pays a surprise visit to Gotham city, and Batwing, ecstatic to have another jet as a friend, brings the arrowplane to life, but the new best friends have to face the reality that the newcomer has to return with Green Arrow to Star City.
24	24	"Ride Along"	Ryan Toyama	July 10, 2023	July 11, 2023	TBA	N/A
After Kitty saves him, Bam has her join him on his night patrol to potentially recruit her, but the playful car is too easily distracted to pay any notice.
25	25	"Wheels Just Wanna Have Fun"	Jennifer Heftler	July 17, 2023	July 18, 2023	TBA	N/A
Bibi learns the hard way that rules are for safety after Jestah keeps tempting her to have fun by breaking them.
26	26	"Tough Buff Blues"	Andrew Guastaferro	July 24, 2023	July 25, 2023	TBA	N/A
After stalling the Riddler on his latest mission, Buff finds himself uncomfortable after the other Batwheels saddle him with the nickname "Tough Buff", leading him to sit out of the next mission.
27	27	"Wheel Side Story"	Andrew Guastaferro	July 31, 2023	August 1, 2023	TBA	N/A
A hit from Ducky's latest device leaves all of the Batwheels only able to sing instead of speak, complicating their ways of communicating.
28	28	"Ace In the Hole"	Andrew Guastaferro	September 11, 2023	September 16, 2023	128	0.04
Buff brings a group of stray dogs into the Batcave to protect them from Catwoman, who wants to lead all of the dogs in Gotham out of the city.
29	29	"Mechanic Panic"	Jennifer Heftler	September 12, 2023	September 16, 2023	129	N/A
Bibi has to help Jestah overcome her fear of mechanics after the Zoomer breaks a wheel while preparing for a tournament.
30	30	"Improvise My Ride"	Sarah Eisenberg & Becky Wangberg	September 13, 2023	September 16, 2023	130	0.06
A nighttime trip to play fetch leads Ace, Bam, and Buff on a mission to stop Poison Ivy from building her own vehicle, but her antics force Buff to improvise after she steals much of his equipment.
31	31	"Dynamic Du-Oh-No"	Andrew Guastaferro	September 14, 2023	September 16, 2023	131	0.07
Thinking herself to be more than capable of going solo, Wing leaves Buff behind when the two are partnered together to stop Jestah and Snowy, which proves to be a disastrous mistake.
32	32	"To the batmobile!"	Craig Fernandez	September 15, 2023	September 16, 2023	132	0.06
Bam is forced to rely on A.D.A.M., Batman's first Batmobile, to help rescue the other Batwheels from the Legion of Zoom, and both Batmobiles learn that each of their methods have their own merits.
33	33	"The Dark Night"	Ryan Toyama	November 6, 2023	September 16, 2023	133	N/A
A city-wide blackout caused by Poison Ivy forces Bam to face his fear of the dark, hampering his efforts in helping Batman.
34	34	"License to Joke"	Craig Fernandez	November 7, 2023	September 16, 2023	134	N/A
On his first solo patrol, Redbird goes undercover to find the man behind several scooters becoming able to drive on their own, but has to learn that going solo doesn't always mean being alone all the time.
35	35	"Bibi's Bad Day"	Scott Gray	November 8, 2023	September 16, 2023	135	0.06
Several mishaps while trying to catch the Joker cause Bibi to lose her motivation, forcing Batgirl to go solo.
36	36	"A Jet Out of Water"	Ryan Toyama	November 9, 2023	September 16, 2023	136	0.06
The Penguin captures Batman and holds him hostage underwater, and Wing is upgraded so that she can dive under and rescue him. However, her decision to not practice before using her upgrades ends up biting her in the back.
37	37	"Batty Body Swap"	Ryan Toyama	November 10, 2023	September 16, 2023	137	0.07
The Batwheels swap bodies with each other to prove that they can use each other's specialties, though they quickly find out that they can't, hampering their efforts to stop the Legion of Zoom.

=== Season 2 (2024) ===
No. overall	No. in season	Title	Directed by	Written by	Original release date	Max release date	Prod. code	U.S. viewers (millions)
38	1	"Nightbike"	Michael Berardini	Ryan Toyama	February 12, 2024	January 12, 2024	201	0.05
Bibi has some competition with Nightwing's motorcycle, Nightbike. These stunt bikes will need to learn that they're better when they work together.
39	2	"Bat-Light Blow-Out"	Michael Berardini	Andrew Guastaferro	February 13, 2024	January 12, 2024	202	N/A
When Legion of Zoom members, Ducky and Quizz, steal the Bat-Signal's one-of-a-kind lightbulb, Bam and Batwing must find a way to restore the legendary signal light, so Batman knows when all of Gotham needs him for hope.
40	3	"Kitty's Sleepover"	Lila Martinez	Ryan Toyama	February 14, 2024	January 12, 2024	203	N/A
Kitty visits the Batcave for a sleepover. However, encouraging her to settle down for a nap proves to be challenging."
41	4	"Mission: Stuffed Animal"	Michael Berardini	Patrick Rieger	February 15, 2024	January 12, 2024	204	N/A
When Redbird takes one of Buff's stuffed animals, without asking him, he enlists Bam to help him make a daring rescue.
42	5	"Follow the Bouncing Bam"	Vaughn Ross	Eva Konstantopoulos	February 16, 2024	January 12, 2024	205	0.09
During a chase with Prank, Bam gets covered in a sticky substance called Bounce X. This gives him unexpected bouncing abilities, and he must learn to harness these new powers to outwit Prank.
43	6	"Big Rig Bam"	Antoine Charreyron	Ryan Toyama	May 20, 2024	May 3, 2024	206	N/A
44	7	"Air-Show, Don't Tell"	Michael Berardini	David Avallone	May 21, 2024	May 3, 2024	207	N/A
45	8	"Monster Truck Amok"	Antoine Charreyron	Ryan Toyama	May 22, 2024	May 3, 2024	208	N/A
46	9	"Razzle dazzle Frazzle"	Michael Berardini	Jennifer Heftler	May 23, 2024	May 3, 2024	209	N/A
When M.O.E. creates a new, super sparkly vehicle paint, the Batwheels decide to put on a talent show to see who will get a shiny new makeover.
47	10	"Multi-MOE"	Lila Martinez	Patrick Rieger	May 24, 2024	May 3, 2024	210	N/A
To ease the burden on M.O.E., the Batwheels use his duplicating machine to make copies of their repair bot, but the Batcave is soon overrun when the machine breaks!
48	11	"The Ulti-Bat Rises"	Lila Martinez	Andrew Guastaferro and Ryan Toyama	February 17, 2025	September 21, 2024	211	N/A
49	12	"A T-Rexcellent Adventure"	Antoine Charreyron	Ryan Toyama	February 18, 2025	September 21, 2024	212	N/A
50	13	"Bats In Show"	Michael Berardini	Andrew Guasteferro	February 19, 2025	September 21, 2024	213	N/A
51	14	"The Gotham Guardians"	Lila Martinez	Andrew Guasteferro	February 20, 2025	September 21, 2024	214	N/A
52	15	"Save the Bat Dance for Me!"	Lila Martinez	Josh Pitta	February 21, 2025	September 21, 2024	215	N/A
53	16	"Nightbike's Noisy Night"	Lila Martinez	Andrew Guastaferro	March 31, 2025	September 21, 2024	216	N/A
54	17	"Bite-Sized Buff"	Vaughn Ross	Chris Roberson	April 1, 2025	September 21, 2024	217	N/A
Feeling insecure about his size after a game of hide-and-seek, Buff uses the shrink belt belonging to The Atom and accidentally shrink himself down to the size of a mouse.
55	18	"Redbird-O-Flage"	Michael Berardini & Vaughn Ross	Craig Fernandez	April 2, 2025	September 21, 2024	218	N/A
Redbird struggles to stop Poison Ivy's diabolical scheme because he wants to be in the spotlight, when he needs to use the bat-o-flage and become invisible, he'll have to learn that doing.
56	19	"Pumpkin Panic"	Lila Martinez	Ryan Toyama	October 20, 2025	September 21, 2024	219	N/A
57	20	"The Wizard of Bats"	Antoine Charreyron	Ryan Toyama	November 3, 2025	September 21, 2024	220	N/A
58	21	"The Great Christmas Caper"	Antoine Charreyron	Sarah Eisenberg & Becky Wangberg	December 1, 2025	December 6, 2024	221	N/A
When Santa's sleigh is damaged, the Batwheels must help Santa deliver presents to the children of Gotham and stop the Legion of Zoom from trying to steal them.
59	22	"The BatgirlMobile"	Antoine Charreyron	Craig Fernandez	April 3, 2025	December 13, 2024	222	N/A
When Bibi is in need of repair, Batgirl takes Bam out for a spin to stop Mr. Freeze's new icy crime spree. Bam will have to get used to having Batgirl in the driver's seat and learn something new if he's going to help her stop Mr. Freeze.
60	23	"Music Meister Mayhem"	Michael Berardini	Sarah Eisenberg	April 4, 2025	December 13, 2024	223	N/A
Music Meister is stealing the singing voices of all the people in Gotham; now it's up to Buff to gain confidence in his Voice and use it to take down Music Meister.
61	24	"Batwing and the Nets"	Antoine Charreyron	Scott Gray	April 28, 2025	December 13, 2024	224	N/A
When Batwing's favorite bat-net gets ripped during a chase with Riddler, she must learn to let go of it if she wishes to help Batman.
62	25	"Clay Date"	Antoine Charreyron	Corey Powell	April 29, 2025	December 13, 2024	225	N/A
Clayface, the most chaotic antagonist of Gotham City, makes his entrance to wreak havoc during the city's annual clean-up day.
63	26	"Wish Upon a Car"	Antoine Charreyron	Craig Carlisle	April 30, 2025	December 13, 2024	226	N/A
Buff makes a wish one magical artifact for the other Batwheels to be turned into monster trucks, just like him!
64	27	"Bibi's Bat-Belt Blunder"	Antoine Charreyron	Andrew Guastaferro	May 1, 2025	December 13, 2024	227	N/A
Bibi just can't put down her new video game, even when MOE needs her help packing Bam's utility belt for a mission; she must overcome the distraction to save the day when Bam's mispacked belt goes haywire.
65	28	"Lend Me Your Volunteer"	Vaughn Ross & T.J. Sullivan	Andrew Guastaferro	May 2, 2025	December 13, 2024	228	N/A
Buff tries to show Batwing how great it is to volunteer to help Gotham's needy, but the Legion of Zoom members Quizz and Jestah get in the way.
66	29	"Condiment Chaos!"	Antoine Charreyron	Becky Wangberg	September 15, 2025	December 13, 2024	229	N/A
67	30	"Bat-Blast-Off!"	T.J. Sullivan	David Avallone	September 15, 2025	December 13, 2024	230	N/A
68	31	"Flight of the Kitty"	Lila Martinez	Josh Pitta	September 16, 2025	December 13, 2024	231	N/A
69	32	"The Bestah Way"	Lila Martinez	Ryan Toyama	September 17, 2025	December 13, 2024	232	N/A
70	33	"MOE Alone"	Antoine Charreyron	Andrew Guastaferro	September 18, 2025	December 13, 2024	233	N/A
71	34	"Bat-Buds Forever"	Antoine Charreyron	Ryan Toyama	October 20, 2025	December 13, 2024	234	N/A
72	35	"Banebuggy"	Antoine Charreyron	David Avallone	October 21, 2025	December 13, 2024	235	N/A
73	36	"Spiffledipped"	Antoine Charreyron	Josh Pitta	October 22, 2025	December 13, 2024	236	N/A
74	37	"Bibi and the Bad Seed"	Antoine Charreyron	Eva Konstantopoulos	October 23, 2025	December 13, 2024	237	N/A

=== Season 3 (2025–26) ===
No. overall	No. in season	Title	Directed by	Written by	Original release date	Max release date	Prod. code	U.S. viewers (millions)
75	1	"Gotham, We Have a Problem"	William Lau	Patrick Rieger	January 19, 2026	December 5, 2025	301	N/A
When Badcomputer activates his own satellite and takes control of every computer on Earth, the Batwheels must launch into space to stop him!
76	2	"Betterwheels"	William Lau	Eva Konstantopoulos	January 26, 2026	December 5, 2025	302	N/A
The Legion of Zoom wants to prove they're better than the Batwheels at doing good for Gotham, so they form their own super-team!
77	3	"The Tumbler Begins"	William Lau	Matt Hoverman	February 2, 2026	December 5, 2025	303	N/A
Batman calls on his newest, amazingly flexible vehicle – the Tumbler – to help him navigate the Joker's funhouse lair!
78	4	"Sizzie Strong"	William Lau	Sarah Eisenberg and Becky Wangberg	February 9, 2026	December 5, 2025	304	N/A
Bibi and Batgirl are surprised to run into Harley and Jestah at their favorite popstar's concert, and now they've all got to team up to save the show!
79	5	"Kitty Kong"	William Lau	Scott Gray	February 16, 2026	February 6, 2026	305	N/A
80	6	"Sidecar Chaos"	William Lau	Jim Krieg	February 23, 2026	February 6, 2026	306	N/A
81	7	"Flight Night"	William Lau	Matt Hoverman	March 2, 2026	February 6, 2026	307	N/A
82	8	"It's My Bat Birthday Too, Yeah"	William Lau	Jim Krieg	March 9, 2026	February 6, 2026	308	N/A
83	9	"Batdraft"	William Lau	Sarah Eisenberg and Becky Wangberg	March 16, 2026	February 6, 2026	309	N/A
84	10	"Presto Change-o"	William Lau	Ryan Toyama	September 14, 2026	May 22, 2026	310	N/A
85	11	"Caped Crusader Caper"	William Lau	Scott Gray	September 15, 2026	May 22, 2026	311	N/A
86	12	"Aqua-Wheels"	William Lau	David Avallone	September 16, 2026	May 22, 2026	312	N/A
87	13	"You Talkin' to Me?"	William Lau	Rick Suvalle	September 17, 2026	May 22, 2026	313	N/A
88	14	"The Butler Did It"	William Lau	Patrick Rieger	September 18, 2026	May 22, 2026	314	N/A
89	15	"A Purr-fect Pair"	William Lau	Eva Konstantopoulos	September 21, 2026	July 17, 2026	315	N/A
90	16	"Third Wheel"	William Lau	Ryan Toyama	September 28, 2026	July 17, 2026	316	N/A
91	17	"Skatin' Ace"	William Lau	Scott Gray	October 5, 2026	July 17, 2026	317	N/A
92	18	"Bats of Clay"	William Lau	Denise Downer	October 12, 2026	July 17, 2026	318	N/A
93	19	"Double Trouble"	William Lau	Matt Hoverman	October 19, 2026	July 17, 2026	319	N/A
94	20	"Ski Blanket Bingo"	William Lau	Alyssa Stratton	November 2, 2026	September 19, 2026	320	TBD
95	21	"Holographic Heist"	William Lau	Tom Krajewski	November 9, 2026	September 19, 2026	321	TBD
96	22	"Bat-Babies"	William Lau	David Avallone Matt Hoverman	November 16, 2026	September 19, 2026	322	TBD
97	23	"Feline Flash Mob"	William Lau	Matt Hoverman	November 23, 2026	September 19, 2026	323	TBD
98	24	"Oh Crow You Don't"	William Lau	Andrew Guasteferro Matt Hoverman	October 26, 2026	October 2, 2026	324	TBD
99	25	"Green Arrow Down"	TBA	TBA	November 30, 2026	November 6, 2026	325	TBD
100	26	"Rearview Window"	TBA	TBA	TBA	November 6, 2026	326	TBD
101	27	"New Year's Robbin Eve"	TBA	TBA	TBA	November 6, 2026	327	TBD
102	28	"Calling All Batmobiles"	TBA	TBA	TBA	November 6, 2026	328	TBD

=== Shorts (2022–23) ===
No.	Title	Directed by	Written by	Original release date	Max release date	Prod. code	U.S. viewers (millions)
1	"Meet the Batwheels"	Michael Berardini and Antoine Charreyron	Michael G. Stern	September 5, 2022	October 18, 2022	MTB101	N/A
2	"Calling All Batwheels"	Michael Berardini	Michael G. Stern	September 12, 2022	October 18, 2022	MTB102	N/A
3	"Bam!"	Michael Berardini	Andrew Guastaferro	September 19, 2022	October 18, 2022	MTB103	N/A
4	"Buff Tuff"	Michael Berardini	Andrew Guastaferro	September 26, 2022	October 18, 2022	MTB104	N/A
5	"Faster"	Michael Berardini	Andrew Guastaferro	October 3, 2022	October 18, 2022	MTB105	N/A
6	"Fly"	Michael Berardini	Andrew Guastaferro	October 10, 2022	October 18, 2022	MTB106	N/A
7	"Spooky Batcave"	Michael Berardini	Michael G. Stern	October 17, 2022	October 18, 2022	MTB108	N/A
8	"Robin's Ride"	Michael Berardini	Andrew Guastaferro	October 24, 2022	October 18, 2022	MTB107	N/A
9	"Bam's Bubble Trouble"	Michael Berardini	Michael G. Stern	October 31, 2022	October 18, 2022	MTB109	N/A
10	"Wheelin' and dealin'"	Michael Berardini	Andrew Guastaferro	November 21, 2022	October 18, 2022	MTB110	N/A
11	"Interview with a Crime-Fighter"	Michael Berardini	Michael G. Stern	December 5, 2022	October 18, 2022	MTB111	N/A
12	"The Best Present In the World"	Michael Berardini and Antoine Charreyron	Andy Sturmer	December 12, 2022	December 13, 2022	112	0.06
13	"Silly Stowaway"	Michael Berardini	Michael G. Stern	January 9, 2023	June 16, 2023	113	N/A
14	"The Knight Shift"	Michael Berardini	Andrew Guastaferro	February 13, 2023	June 16, 2023	114	N/A
15	"Rockin' Robin"	Michael Berardini	Michael G. Stern	March 6, 2023	June 16, 2023	115	N/A
16	"Bibi Bops"	Michael Berardini	Jennifer Heftler	April 10, 2023	June 16, 2023	116	N/A
17	"Batwingin' It"	Michael Berardini	Jennifer Heftler	May 15, 2023	June 16, 2023	117	0.06
18	"Bad to the Chrome"	Michael Berardini	N/A	June 5, 2023	June 16, 2023	118	N/A
19	"A Joking Matter"	Michael Berardini	Andrew Guastaferro	July 3, 2023	December 1, 2023	119	N/A
20	"Parking Problems"	Michael Berardini	Andrew Guastaferro	August 7, 2023	December 1, 2023	120	N/A
21	"Bat Surfin'"	Michael Berardini and Antoine Charreyron	N/A	August 28, 2023	December 1, 2023	121	N/A
22	"I'll Be Your Shelter"	Michael Berardini and Antoine Charreyron	N/A	November 27, 2023	December 1, 2023	124	N/A
23	"Jet Set"	Antoine Charreyron	N/A	November 28, 2023	December 1, 2023	123	N/A
24	"Bad Day"	Antoine Charreyron	N/A	December 5, 2023	December 1, 2023	122	N/A

== Production ==
=== Development ===
In October 2020, it was announced that an animated preschool series centered around the Batmobile was in development at Warner Bros. Animation, set to premiere on Cartoon Network's then-upcoming preschool block Cartoonito and HBO Max. According to Tom Ascheim, president of the now-defunct Warner Bros. Global Kids, Young Adults and Classics, the series was greenlit due to its concept being fit for the studio's focus on preschool projects. Michael G. Stern serves as developer and co-executive producer, with Simon J. Smith as supervising producer, and Steven Fink and Caroline Karmel producing. Stern was brought into the project early in development, as WB explored ideas for preschool-oriented DC shows, while Smith was brought after Stern wrote the first scripts for the series. In October 2021, during that year's DC FanDome convention event, Cobra Kai star, Jacob Bertrand, the voice behind Bam the Batmobile, announced a sneak peek of the show. In December 2022, the series was renewed for a second season, with Stern and Smith being promoted to executive producers. In October 2024, the series was renewed for a third season.

=== Writing ===
While writing the series, Stern wanted to avoid "kiddifying" the characters, as he felt children should be introduced to the characters through faithful portrayals and was also requested to respect the characters. For Batman, he wrote the character to stay faithful to most interpretations, with only his violence being toned down. He also wrote the villains with "a lane" that stayed faithful to their classical portrayals while still fitting the target audience, such as portraying Harley Quinn as a fun-loving prankster.

When creating the Batwheels, the writers wanted them to be perceived as "lovable" and "fun" characters for the audience, in order to avoid the children only watching the show for Batman. In order to accomplish this, they tested the personalities for each character with a test group, who received the characters positively. The writers also wanted to avoid portraying the Legion of Zoom as mere copies of their owners, to which they gave each vehicle their own characteristics, such as portraying Prank, the Joker's van, as "a surfer dude".

=== Animation ===
The series' animation services are handled by French animation studio Superprod Animation and Israeli-Canadian animation production service Snowball Studios (who previously handled the show's pilot and early development).

=== Music ===
The series' score was composed by Alex Geringas, while the theme song was performed and produced by Andy Sturmer, who previously composed the themes for the series The Batman and Batman: The Brave and the Bold. Sturmer also co-wrote the theme alongside Stern.

== Marketing ==
=== Merchandise ===
On July 23, 2023, Warner Bros. Discovery Global Consumer Products and Mattel announced an extension of its global licensing partnership for over 50 of its brands under various categories such as preschool, plush, dolls, vehicles, novelty toy and board games which included Batwheels.

== Awards and nominations ==
The show was nominated for Best Animated Television/Broadcast Production for Preschool Children for the episode "To the Batmobile!" at the 51st Annie Awards.
