= Bookworm (character) =

Fictional DC comics character

- Bookworm as depicted in Batman '66 #30 (February 2016). Art by Michael Allred.

Publication information
- First appearance: Batman "The Bookworm Turns" (April 20, 1966)
- First comic appearance: Gotham Academy #2 (January 2015)
- Created by: William Dozier; Larry Peerce

In-story information
- Abilities: Genius-level intelligence

The Bookworm is a fictional criminal in the DC Universe, and an adversary of the superhero Batman. He was created for the Batman 1966 television series and was played by Roddy McDowall, but has since made his way into the comics. Bookworm usually wears a brown suit, meant to resemble a leather-bound book.

== Fictional character biography ==
=== Batman 1966 ===
Bookworm was created for the Batman (1966) series and first appeared in the consecutive episodes "The Bookworm Turns" and "While Gotham City Burns". In these episodes, he steals many high-value books and leaves clues for Batman to solve — similar to the Riddler — which eventually leads to his defeat. His crimes are literature-themed, and his dialogue often contains literary references.

He appears in several issues of Batman '66, the tie-in comic series for the show.

=== Comics ===
Bookworm appears in Gotham Academy. This version is A.S. Scarlet. a literary teacher who commits literature-themed crimes.

Bookworm also appears in the comic series Huntress, where he is reimagined as a serial killer named Alexander Wyvern. He is captured after killing 106 citizens and placed in solitary confinement, which he eventually escapes, with the motive of hunting down Huntress. He dies after tripping one of his own traps, a hallway filled with guns.

== Powers and abilities ==
The Bookworm does not possess superpowers per se, but is shown reading the entire contents of an oversized and lengthy book within "a matter of seconds." Additionally he exhibits a genius level intellect, specifically a high knowledge of books and their contents, including the ability to quote obscure references from old books.

== In other media ==
=== Television ===
Bookworm makes a non-speaking cameo appearance in the Batman: The Brave and the Bold episode "Day of the Dark Knight!" as an inmate of Iron Heights Penitentiary.

=== Film ===
- Bookworm makes a non-speaking cameo appearance in Batman: Return of the Caped Crusaders.
- Bookworm appears in Batman vs. Two-Face, voiced by Jeff Bergman.
- Bookworm makes a non-speaking cameo appearance in Scooby-Doo! & Batman: The Brave and the Bold as an inmate of Arkham Asylum.

== See also ==
- List of Batman family enemies
