= King Tut (comics) =

Batman supervillain

Publication information
- Publisher: DC Comics
- First appearance: Batman "The Curse of Tut" (April 13, 1966)
- First comic appearance: Batman Confidential #26 (April 2009)
- Created by: Earl Barret (writer); Robert C. Dennis (writer); Charles R. Rondeau (director); Victor Buono (actor)

In-story information
- Alter ego: William Omaha McElroy; Victor Goodman
- Species: Human
- Notable aliases: Pharaoh

King Tut (William Omaha McElroy) is a fictional character in the television series Batman who first appeared in the episode "The Curse of Tut" (April 13, 1966). He was created by Earl Barret, Robert C. Dennis, and Charles R. Rondeau and is portrayed by Victor Buono for the majority of his appearances, though Guy Way portrays King Tut in the episode "The Entrancing Dr. Cassandra". In his memoir, Back to the Batcave, Adam West describes him as the only series-original villain to be a real success.

The character is depicted as an Egyptologist at Yale University who is convinced that he is a reincarnation of the Pharaoh Tutankhamun. Tut eventually discovers the Batcave and deduces Batman's secret identity, but he is defeated before he can expose it.

== Publication history ==
The character of King Tut started out in the Batman television series' original run.

== Fictional character biography ==
=== Batman ===
Professor William Omaha McElroy is an Egyptologist at Yale University who suffers a blow to the head during a student riot that causes him to develop amnesia and believe he is a reincarnation of Tutankhamun. Ever since, he has made several attempts to conquer Gotham City and defeat Batman, Robin, and later Batgirl, only to suffer more blows to the head that revert him to his original personality before he can succeed. Due to being cognizant of what happens during his time as King Tut, McElroy tries to prevent unwanted blows and personality shifts, though without success.

Throughout his appearances, King Tut's plans to take over Gotham have involved ancient scarab beetles capable of creating a mind control potion; gaining assistance from two Yale students who suffered their own blows to their heads and believe themselves to be King Tut's royal jester and Lord Chancellor; masquerading as a crime predictor and claiming Bruce Wayne is Batman while attempting to secure a scroll that will lead him to a god statue; and joining forces with Dr. Cassandra Spellcraft and Cabala, among other supervillains, in a bid to take over Gotham City in exchange for being allowed to rob Gotham's museums.

In the episode "I'll Be a Mummy's Uncle", Tut buys land adjacent to Wayne Manor to mine for a rare mineral. In the process, he discovers the Batcave and deduces Batman's secret identity, but is defeated before he can expose it.

=== DC Universe ===
A depiction of King Tut, Victor Goodman, made his DC Comics Universe debut in Batman Confidential #26 (April 2009), and was created by Christina Weir, Nunzio DeFilippis, and José Luis García-López. His name is an homage to actor Victor Buono, since "Buono" is Italian for "good".

Goodman is a criminal egyptologist who targets and murders wealthy citizens and leaves Egyptian-themed riddles, similar to the Riddle of the Sphinx. Batman teams up with the Riddler, who does not appreciate his modus operandi being stolen and agrees to help stop Goodman. They manage to defeat King Tut, who is sent to prison until he is transferred to Arkham Asylum.

The character appears once again in "DC Rebirth" in The Riddler: Year of the Villain as a friend of Edward Nygma. He is first shown talking to Nygma in an Egyptian-themed restaurant, and Nygma tells him that he is angry and jealous that he has not received a visit from Lex Luthor (who has been visiting various villains across the DC Universe as part of a nefarious plan he is setting up). But after stating this, he eventually gets visited by Luthor anyway. King Tut then appears later on, telling him that they should team up to outsmart Batman by working together, and he initially agrees. After Batman goes through a complicated Egyptian puzzle set up by Tut, the Riddler decides to quit and leaves, thinking about the advice Luthor gave him. Batman then knocks out Tut with a single punch.

== In other media ==
=== Television ===
- A character inspired by King Tut called the Pharaoh for copyright reasons appears in Batman: The Brave and the Bold, voiced by John DiMaggio. This version wields a staff capable of turning people into obedient zombies and has been imprisoned at Iron Heights Penitentiary and Blackgate Penitentiary.
- A character inspired by King Tut named Fletcher Demming appears in the Batman: Caped Crusader episode "The Stress of Her Regard", voiced by David Krumholtz.
- King Tut appears in Batwheels, voiced by Wayne Knight.
- King Tut appears in Bat-Fam, voiced by Fred Tatasciore. This version is an ex-villain.

=== Film ===
- King Tut appears in Batman: Return of the Caped Crusaders.
- King Tut appears in The Lego Batman Movie as a member of the Joker's army.
- King Tut appears in Batman vs. Two-Face, voiced by Wally Wingert.
- King Tut makes a non-speaking cameo appearance in Scooby-Doo! & Batman: The Brave and the Bold.

=== Miscellaneous ===
King Tut appears in Batman Unburied as a resident of Arkham Asylum.

== See also ==
- List of Batman family enemies
