= Batman vs. Two-Face =

- Blu-ray cover
- Directed by: Rick Morales
- Written by: Michael Jelenic; James Tucker
- Based on: Batman by: William Dozier; Bob Kane; Bill Finger
- Produced by: Alan Burnett (co-producer); Michael Jelenic (producer); Benjamin Melniker; Sam Register (executive producers); James Tucker (supervising producer); Michael Uslan
- Starring: Adam West; Burt Ward; William Shatner; Julie Newmar
- Edited by: Christopher D. Lozinski
- Music by: Kristopher Carter; Michael McCuistion; Lolita Ritmanis
- Production companies: Warner Bros. Animation; DC Entertainment
- Distributed by: Warner Bros. Home Entertainment
- Release dates: October 8, 2017 (New York Comic Con); October 10, 2017
- Running time: 72 minutes
- Country: United States
- Language: English

Batman vs. Two-Face is a 2017 American animated direct-to-video superhero film produced by Warner Bros. Animation and distributed by Warner Bros. Home Entertainment and a direct sequel to Batman: Return of the Caped Crusaders. It premiered at the New York Comic Con on October 8, 2017, was released digitally on October 10, and on DVD and Blu-ray on October 17. Based on the 1960s Batman television series, the film stars Adam West, Burt Ward, and Julie Newmar reprising their roles of Batman, Robin and Catwoman from the series. It was West's final performance as Batman and was released posthumously.

== Plot ==
Batman and Robin meet Gotham District Attorney Harvey Dent at a top-secret demonstration hosted by Professor Hugo Strange and Dr. Harleen Quinzel. Strange operates a machine called the "Evil Extractor" designed to siphon evil from criminals and store it in a vat. The containment vat explodes, drenching Dent with liquefied evil, which scars half his face and changes his personality, turning him into the criminal "Two-Face". After being thwarted by Batman and Robin many times, Dent is eventually given reconstructive surgery, seemingly erasing the Two-Face personality, and allowed to resume crimefighting as the assistant to the Assistant District Attorney.

Six months later, Batman and Robin capture King Tut and his henchmen for stealing a biplane. Batman, Robin, Commissioner Gordon, and Chief O'Hara interrogate Tut's alter ego, Professor William McElroy, with O'Hara repeatedly hitting the professor on the head with his truncheon to switch his personality. At his trial, McElroy admits his guilt, ready to suffer the minimum penalty of being rehabilitated in prison. After the sentencing, Dent and Bruce Wayne share a highball just before Dent leaves to attend a charity for underprivileged twins at the Winning Pair casino.

A package arrives at Gordon's office; a World Atlas book marked for Batman, with its pages eaten away in three holes. After investigating Bookworm as a suspect, Batman and Robin deduce that the stolen books were all about duality and their suspicions turn to Two-Face. They head to an abandoned sign factory, with Two-Face and his henchmen waiting for them. After defeating the goons, Two-Face pins them with a large number two and the flip of his coin landing on the right side spares their lives. Once they have left, Batman theorizes that several criminals are uniting against Dent for foiling their schemes.

Following Dent back to the lab, Robin is ambushed by Two-Face. Strange corrupts him with some of the liquid evil and Batman is forced to fight and subdue the hypnotized Robin. Robin is cured at the Batcave and they follow Two-Face to the Winning Pair Casino, where he is revealed to be Dent. Once Batman and Robin are strapped to a large silver dollar, Two-Face unmasks Batman as Bruce and deduces Robin's true identity as Dick Grayson. He invites several other villains to bid for the knowledge of Batman and Robin's identities.

With Catwoman's help, Batman and Robin defeat the villains, but Two-Face gets away on the biplane stolen by Tut, using the evil gas to corrupt the citizens of Gotham City. Batman and Robin shoot him down and with Batman's help, Dent regains self-control, defeating Two-Face for good as they escape the factory.

The next morning, Batman and Robin use the Batwing to cure the infected citizens. Months later, Dent holds a bachelor auction at Wayne Manor with Batman as the first bachelor. The first bid comes from Catwoman.

In a Blu-ray exclusive scene, Quinzel breaks the Joker out of prison while wearing a costume of her own, having adopted the supervillain persona "Harley Quinn".

== Voice cast ==
- Adam West as Bruce Wayne / Batman
- Burt Ward as Dick Grayson / Robin
- William Shatner as Harvey Dent / Two-Face
- Julie Newmar as Catwoman
- Steven Weber as Alfred Pennyworth
- Jim Ward as Commissioner Gordon, Hugo Strange
- Thomas Lennon as Chief Miles O'Hara, Warden Crichton
- Lynne Marie Stewart as Aunt Harriet Cooper
- Jeff Bergman as Joker, Bookworm, Desmond Dumas
- Wally Wingert as Riddler, King Tut
- William Salyers as Penguin
- Sirena Irwin as Dr. Harleen Quinzel
- Lee Meriwether as Lucilee Diamond

== Production ==
=== Development ===
The film is a sequel to Batman: Return of the Caped Crusaders and was announced as featuring William Shatner voicing the main antagonist, Two-Face. Despite the death of Batman actor Adam West from leukemia on June 9, 2017, West and Shatner recorded their lines separately, with West finishing his lines by October 2016. Burt Ward and Julie Newmar reprised their roles as Robin and Catwoman. Lee Meriwether plays a role that sees her character wear the iconic Catwoman costume as a reference to her performance as Catwoman in the 1966 Batman feature film.

The film included a tribute to the late West after the end credits ("In Loving Memory of Adam West (1928–2017). Rest well, Bright Knight").

=== Music ===
The score by Lolita Ritmanis, Michael McCuistion, and Kristopher Carter was released on October 6, on CD by WaterTower Music and La-La Land Records as an exclusive with FYE.

== Release ==
Batman vs. Two-Face premiered at the New York Comic Con on October 8, 2017 and was later released digitally on October 10 and on DVD and Blu-ray on October 17.

=== Reception ===
Batman vs. Two-Face holds a 100% rating on Rotten Tomatoes based on eight reviews. IGN awarded the film a score of 8.4 out of 10: "Batman vs. Two-Face is a worthy entry in the 1966 canon and a fine send-off for the late Adam West". Writing for Starburst, Nick Blackshaw awarded the film a score of 8 out of 10, saying "Batman Vs. Two-Face is a very entertaining piece of animation".

Batman vs. Two-Face earned $310,696 from domestic DVD sales and $840,172 from domestic Blu-ray sales, bringing its total domestic home video earnings to $1,150,868.
