= Julie Newmar =

American actress (born 1933)

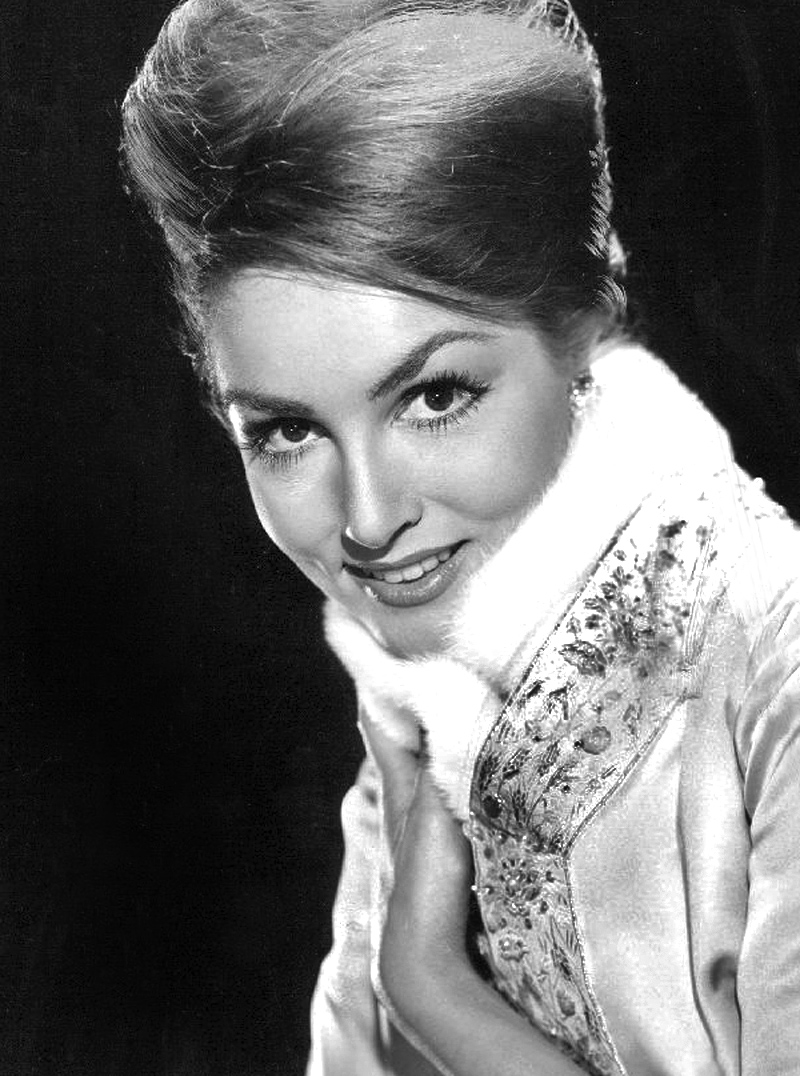
- Newmar in 1965
- Born: Julia Chalene Newmeyer; August 16, 1933 (age 93); Los Angeles, California, US
- Occupations: Actress; dancer; singer; businesswoman; writer
- Years active: 1952–present
- Known for: Catwoman in Batman; The Marriage-Go-Round (play and the film adaptation)
- Spouse: J. Holt Smith (m. 1977; div. 1984)
- Children: 1
- Awards: Inkpot Award (2014)
- Website: www.julienewmar.com

Julie Newmar (born Julia Chalene Newmeyer; August 16, 1933) is an American actress, dancer, and singer known for a variety of stage, screen, and television roles. She is also a writer, lingerie designer, and real estate mogul. She won the Tony Award for Best Featured Actress in a Play for her role as Katrin Sveg in the 1958 Broadway production of The Marriage-Go-Round, and reprised the role in the 1961 film version, earning Newmar a nomination for a Golden Globe Award for Most Promising Newcomer - Actress. In the 1960s, she starred for two seasons as Catwoman in the television series Batman (1966–1967). Her other stage credits include Ziegfeld Follies in 1956, Lola in Damn Yankees in 1961, and in 1965, as Irma in regional productions of Irma la Douce.

Newmar appeared in the music video for George Michael's 1992 single "Too Funky" and had a cameo as herself in the 1995 film To Wong Foo, Thanks for Everything! Julie Newmar. Her voice work includes the animated feature films Batman: Return of the Caped Crusaders (2016) and Batman vs. Two-Face (2017), for which she reprised her role as Catwoman, 50 years after the original television series.

== Early life ==
Newmar was born in Los Angeles, California, on August 16, 1933, as the eldest of three children born to Don and Helene (née Jesmer) Newmeyer. Her father was head of the physical education department at Los Angeles City College, and had played American football professionally in the 1920s with the 1926 Los Angeles Buccaneers of the National Football League. Her Swedish-French mother was a fashion designer who used "Chalene" as her professional name and later became a real estate investor.

Newmar was raised in her mother's religion, Christian Science. As an adult, Newmar would say of her religious upbringing: “It’s an enormously good basis for anyone who wants to live a powerful life, either in show business or anything.”

Newmar has two younger brothers: Peter Bruce Newmeyer, who was killed in a skiing accident, and John A. Newmeyer, who became a writer, epidemiologist, and winemaker. She began dancing at an early age, and performed as a prima ballerina with the Los Angeles Opera when she was 15.

== Career ==
=== Early work and stage career ===
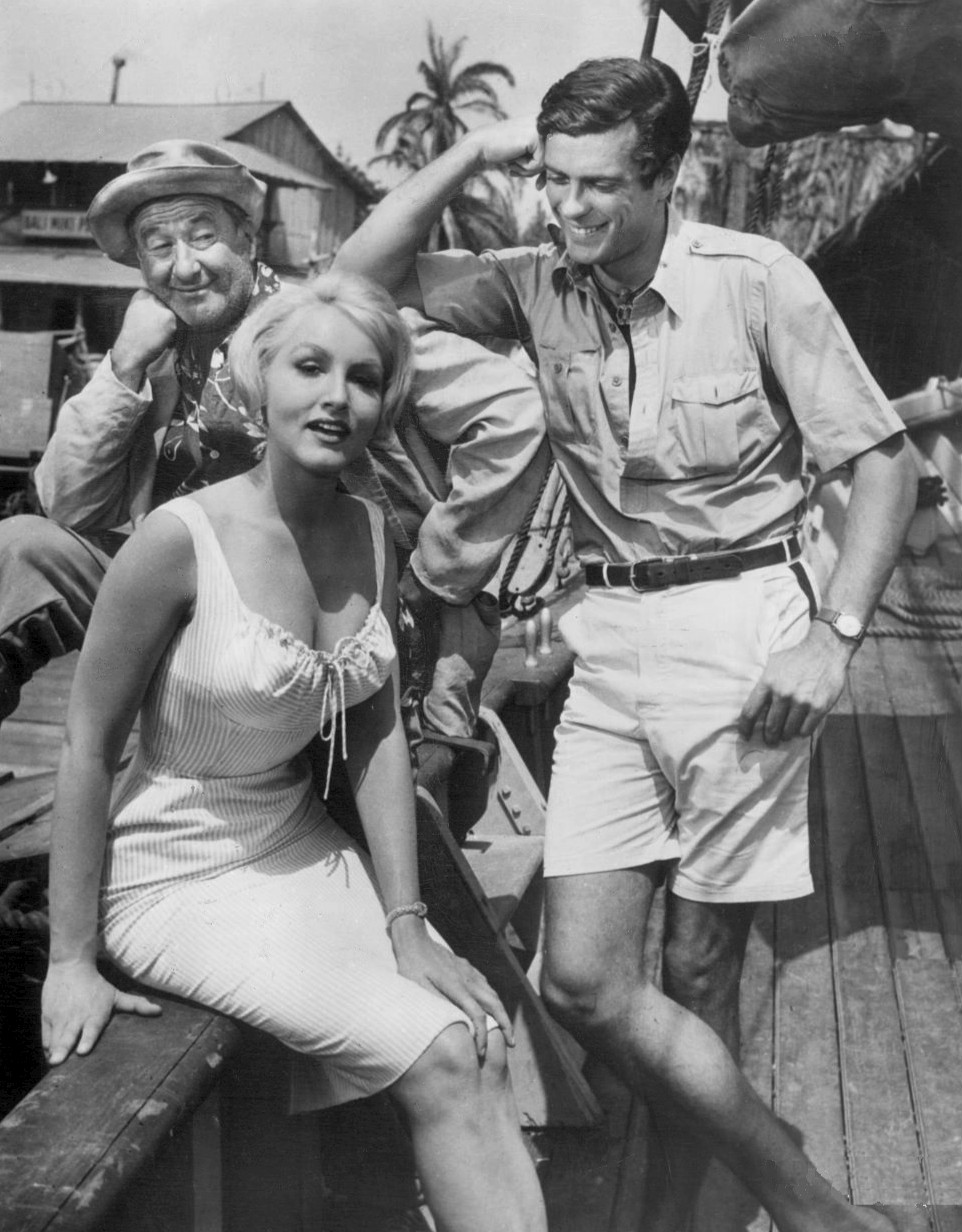
On the set of Adventures in Paradise (1960), L–R: George Tobias, Newmar, and Gardner McKay

George Maharis with guest star Newmar in Route 66 (1962)

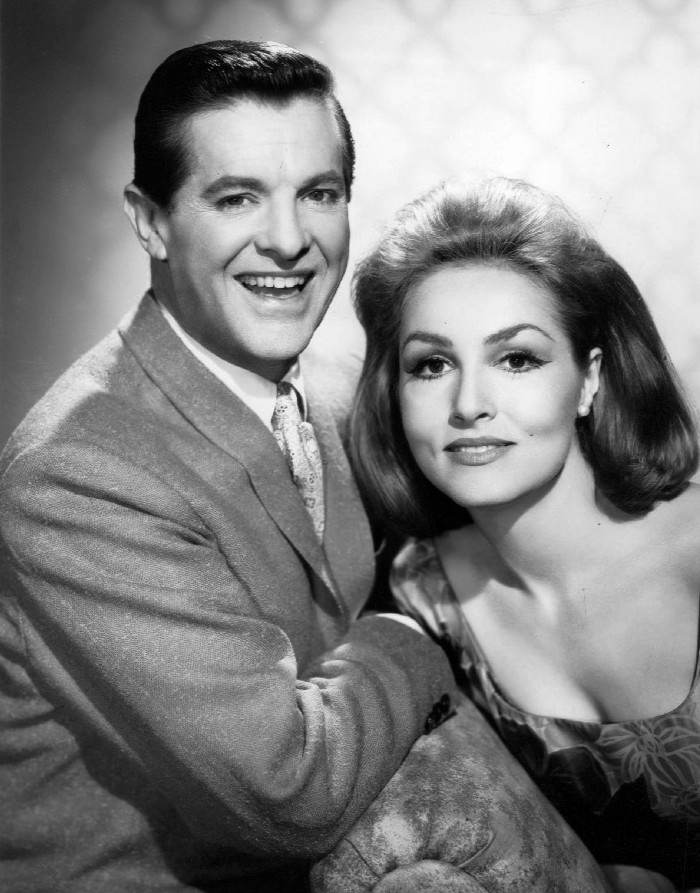
Newmar with Bob Cummings in My Living Doll (1964)

Newmar appeared in bit parts and uncredited roles in films as a dancer, including a part as the "dancer-assassin" in Slaves of Babylon (1953) and the "gilded girl" in Serpent of the Nile (1953), in which she was clad in gold paint. She danced in several other films, including The Band Wagon (also 1953) and Demetrius and the Gladiators (1954). She also worked as a choreographer and dancer for Universal Studios beginning at the age of 19. Her first major role, billed as Julie Newmeyer, was as Dorcas, one of the brides in Seven Brides for Seven Brothers (1954). She was also the female lead in a low-budget comedy, The Rookie (1959).

Newmar made her Broadway debut in 1955 as Vera in Silk Stockings, starring Hildegarde Neff and Don Ameche. In the following year she created the role of Stupefyin' Jones (a three-minute cameo) in the Broadway production of Li'l Abner. She stayed with the production for its entire run from November 1956 through July 1958, and also appeared in the film version, released in 1959. A few months later, The Marriage-Go-Round opened on Broadway, with Newmar in the role of Swedish vixen Katrin Sveg, for which Newmar won the 1959 Tony Award for Best Featured Actress in a Play. She later re-created this role for the 1961 film adaptation, starring James Mason and Susan Hayward. In 1961, she appeared in the Sam Spewack play Once There Was a Russian, which lasted only one performance. She later starred opposite Joel Grey in the national tour of Stop the World – I Want to Get Off, staying with the tour from March to October 1963. In 1973, Newmar was slated to return to Broadway in the David Rabe play Boom Boom Room, opening on November 8, 1973, at the Vivian Beaumont Theater at Lincoln Center. Director Julie Bovasso fired Newmar during rehearsals, and she was replaced by her understudy, Mary Woronov. Bovasso was then replaced as director during previews.

=== Television work ===
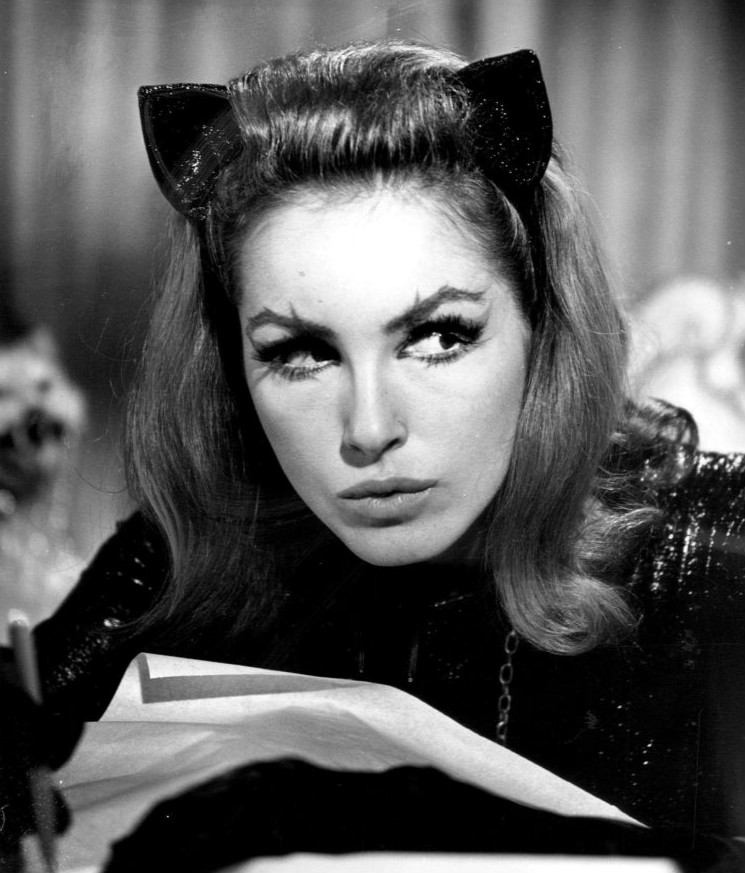
Newmar as Catwoman (1966)

Newmar's fame stems mainly from her television appearances. Her statuesque form and height made her a larger-than-life sex symbol, most often cast as a temptress or Amazonian beauty, including an early appearance in a sexy maid costume in The Phil Silvers Show. She starred as Rhoda the Robot in the television series My Living Doll (1964–1965), and is known for her recurring role in the 1960s television series Batman as the villainess Catwoman. (Lee Meriwether played Catwoman in the 1966 feature film because Newmar was unaware that a film was going to be made, and had already signed onto an adaptation of Monsieur Lecoq that was never made; Eartha Kitt portrayed Catwoman in the series' final season. For the final season, Newmar was busy making the film Mackenna's Gold, shot during the filming of the final season, but not released until 1969.) Newmar modified her Catwoman costume—now in the Smithsonian Institution—and placed the belt at the hips instead of the waist to emphasize her hourglass figure.

In 1962, Newmar appeared twice as the motorcycle-riding, free-spirited heiress Vicki Russell in Route 66, filmed in Tucson ("How Much a Pound Is Albatross") and in Tennessee ("Give the Old Cat a Tender Mouse"). She guest-starred in The Twilight Zone as the devil in "Of Late I Think of Cliffordville", F Troop ("Yellow Bird" in 1966) as a girl kidnapped as a child and raised by Native Americans, Bewitched ("The Eight-Year Itch Witch" in 1971) as a cat named Ophelia given human form, The Beverly Hillbillies as a Swedish actress who stays with the Clampetts to learn their accents and mannerisms for a role, and Get Smart as a double agent, posing as a maid, assigned to Maxwell Smart's apartment. In 1967, she guest-starred as April Conquest in an episode of The Monkees ("Monkees Get Out More Dirt", season one, episode 29), in which the main characters all fall in love with her, and played the pregnant Capellan princess, Eleen, in the Star Trek episode "Friday's Child". In 1969, she played a hit woman in the It Takes a Thief episode "The Funeral is on Mundy" with Robert Wagner. In 1983, she reprised the hit-woman role in Hart to Hart, Wagner's later television series, in the episode "A Change of Hart". In the 1970s, she had guest roles in Columbo and The Bionic Woman.

=== Later roles ===
Newmar appeared in several low-budget films during the next two decades. She guest-starred on TV, appearing in The Love Boat, Buck Rogers in the 25th Century, CHiPs, and Fantasy Island. She was featured in the music video for George Michael's "Too Funky" in 1992. She appeared as herself in the 1995 film To Wong Foo, Thanks for Everything! Julie Newmar and a 1996 episode of Melrose Place.

In 2003, Newmar appeared as herself in the television movie Return to the Batcave: The Misadventures of Adam and Burt alongside former Batman co-stars Adam West, Burt Ward, Frank Gorshin, and Lee Meriwether. Julia Rose played Newmar in flashbacks to the production of the television series. However, due to longstanding rights issues over footage from the Batman TV series, only footage of Meriwether taken from the feature film was allowed to be used in the television movie. In 2016, she provided the voice of Catwoman in the animated film Batman: Return of the Caped Crusaders. In 2017, she reprised her role in the animated sequel Batman vs. Two-Face. Newmar also appeared on The Home and Family Show in May 2016, where she met Gotham actress Camren Bicondova who portrays a younger Selina Kyle.

In 2019, Newmar played the role of Dr. Julia Hoffman (replacing the late Grayson Hall) in the audio drama miniseries Dark Shadows: Bloodline.

== Inventor and entrepreneur ==
In the 1970s, Newmar received two U.S. patents for pantyhose and two for a brassiere, one being a design patent. The pantyhose were described as having "cheeky derriere relief" and promoted under the name "Nudemar". The brassiere was described as "nearly invisible" and in the style of Marilyn Monroe.

Julie Newmar Patents
Title	Patent Number	Publication Date
Design Patent for Brassiere	US-D235389	1975-06-17
Pantyhose with shaping band for cheeky derrière relief	US-3914799	1975-10-28
Brassiere	US-3935865	1976-02-03
Pantyhose with shaping band for cheeky derrière relief (A change in the types of fabrics for the earlier patent)	US-4003094	1977-01-18

=== Real estate entrepreneur ===
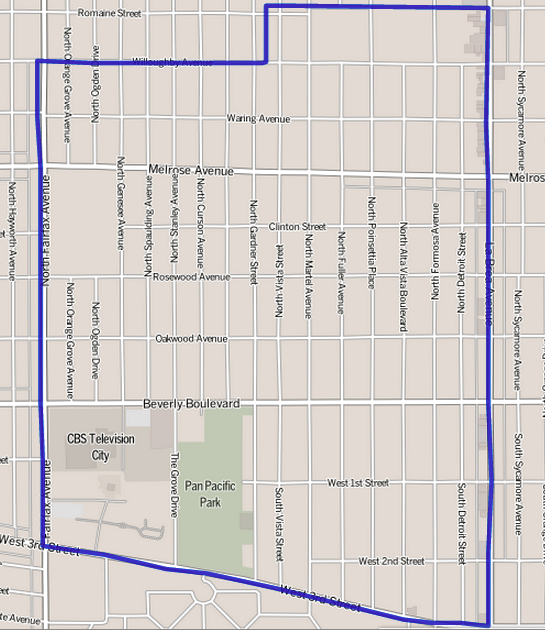
Map of Fairfax District

Newmar's parents invested in real estate in the 1940s and 1950s, purchasing buildings in the La Brea and Fairfax Avenue areas of Los Angeles. Her father owned property on Fairfax and Rosewood Avenue in the 1940s. As a young actress, she ran the real estate enterprise. In the 1970s, Newmar returned to UCLA to study real estate and expanded her continued management of her parents' real estate investments. She made notable investments in the La Brea and Melrose Avenue area. Melrose Avenue passes through the Fairfax District, where her parents had earlier been property owners, as shown on the adjacent map. She was considered to have significantly contributed to the area's development. Newmar was described as having contributed significant time in community advocacy as well.

== Personal life ==
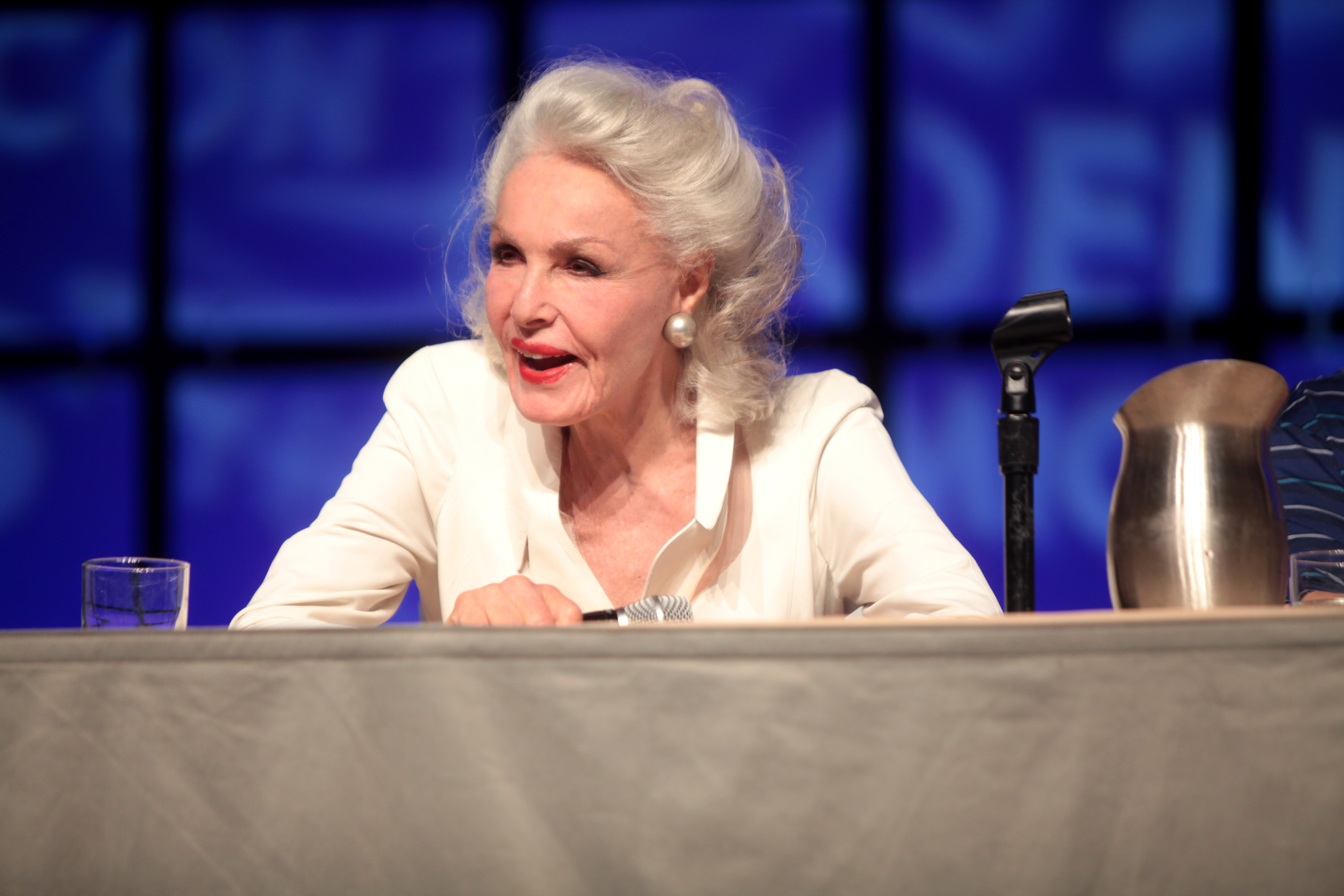
Newmar attending Phoenix Comicon, 2014

After a broken engagement to novelist Louis L'Amour and romances with comedian Mort Sahl and actor Ken Scott, Newmar married J. Holt Smith, a lawyer, on August 5, 1977, and moved with him to Fort Worth, Texas, where she lived until their divorce in 1984.

Newmar's only child, her son John, was born in 1981 with Down Syndrome. At age three, he contracted meningitis which left him deaf. Doctors suggested sending John to live in a care home, but she never considered it. She took sign language classes at night school so that she could teach her son to communicate and raised him as a single parent after her divorce.

Newmar has Charcot–Marie–Tooth disease, an inherited neurological condition that affects one in 2,500 Americans.

A legal battle with her neighbor, actor Jim Belushi, ended amicably with an invitation to guest-star in his sitcom According to Jim in an episode ("The Grumpy Guy") that poked fun at the feud.

An avid gardener, Newmar initiated at least a temporary ban on leaf blowers with the Los Angeles City Council. She supported the presidential campaigns of Eugene McCarthy in 1968 and Ron Paul in 2012.

Newmar, whose brother is gay, has been a vocal supporter of LGBT rights. In 2013, she was awarded a lifetime achievement award from the Gay and Lesbian Elder Housing organization in Los Angeles.

Newmar is a classically trained pianist.

== In popular culture ==
In 2012, Bluewater Comics released a four-issue comic miniseries titled The Secret Lives of Julie Newmar.

In the 2026 video game Lego Batman: Legacy of the Dark Knight, missing posters for a grey cat called "Julie Mewmar" can be found in Gotham City.

The popular 1995 American road comedy-drama To Wong Foo, Thanks for Everything! Julie Newmar about drag queens on a road trip, mentions her in the title.

== Filmography ==
=== Film ===
Year	Title	Role	Notes
1952	She's Working Her Way Through College	Julie	Uncredited
1952	Just for You	Chorine	Uncredited
1953	The I Don't Care Girl	Beale Street Blues Dancer	Uncredited
1953	Call Me Madam	Ocarna Dancer	Uncredited
1953	Serpent of the Nile	Golden Girl	
1953	The Farmer Takes a Wife	Dancer	Uncredited
1953	Gentlemen Prefer Blondes	Chorus Girl	Uncredited
1953	The Band Wagon	Salon Model / Chorine in Girl Hunt Ballet	Uncredited
1953	Slaves of Babylon	Dancer-Assassin	
1953	The Eddie Cantor Story	Showgirl	Uncredited
1954	Demetrius and the Gladiators	Primary Specialty Dancer	Uncredited
1954	Seven Brides for Seven Brothers	Dorcas Gaylen	
1954	Deep in My Heart	Vamp	Uncredited
1959	Li'l Abner	"Stupefyin'" Jones	
1959	The Rookie	Lili Marlene	
1961	The Marriage-Go-Round	Katrin Sveg	Nominated – Golden Globe Award for Most Promising Newcomer
1963	For Love or Money	Bonnie Brasher	
1969	Mackenna's Gold	Hesh-Ke	
1969	The Maltese Bippy	Carlotta Ravenswood	
1970	Mother (Seduction of a Nerd)	Mother	Also known as Up Your Teddy Bear
1983	Hysterical	Venetia	
1984	Love Scenes	Belinda	
1985	Streetwalkin'	"Queen Bee"	
1988	Deep Space	Lady Elaine Wentworth	
1988	Body Beat	Miss McKenzie	Also known as Dance Academy
1989	Ghosts Can't Do It	Angel	Nominated – Golden Raspberry Award for Worst Supporting Actress
1994	Oblivion	Miss Kitty	
1995	To Wong Foo, Thanks for Everything! Julie Newmar	Herself	
1996	Oblivion 2: Backlash	Miss Kitty / Ariel Gwen Shana	
1999	If... Dog... Rabbit...	Judy's Mother	
2003	Return to the Batcave: The Misadventures of Adam and Burt	Herself / Arizona Bar Owner	Television film
2010	Beautiful Darling	Herself	Documentary
2012	Bettie Page Reveals All	Herself	Documentary
2012	The Mechanical Bride	Herself, The Narrator	Documentary
2013	Broadway: Beyond the Golden Age	Herself	Documentary
2016	Batman: Return of the Caped Crusaders	Catwoman (voice)	
2017	Batman vs. Two-Face	Catwoman (voice)	

=== Television ===
Year	Title	Role	Notes
1957	The Phil Silvers Show	Suzie	Episode: "The Big Scandal"
1959	Omnibus		Episode: "Malice in Wonderland"
1960	Adventures in Paradise	Venus	Episode: "Open for Diving"
1961	The Defenders	Brandy Gideon Morfoot	Episode: "Gideon's Follies"
1962	Route 66	Vicki Russell	2 episodes
1963	The Twilight Zone	Miss Devlin	Episode: "Of Late I Think of Cliffordville"
1963	The Danny Kaye Show	Herself	Episode: "1.12"
1964	The Greatest Show on Earth	Willa Harper	Episode: "Of Blood, Sawdust, and a Bucket of Tears"
1964–1965	My Living Doll	Rhoda Miller	Nominated – Golden Globe Award for Best TV Star – Female
1965	Vacation Playhouse	Kris Meeker	Episode: "Three on an Island"
1966–1967	Batman	Catwoman / Minerva Matthews / Miss Klutz	13 episodes
1966	The Beverly Hillbillies	Ulla Bergstrom	Episode: "The Beautiful Maid"
1966	F Troop	Cinthia Jeffries / Yellow Bird	Episode: "Yellow Bird"
1967	The Monkees	April Conquest	S1:E29, "Monkees Get Out More Dirt"
1967	Star Trek: The Original Series	Eleen	Episode: "Friday's Child"
1968	Get Smart	Ingrid	Episode: "The Laser Blazer"
1969	It Takes a Thief	Susannah Sutton	Episode: "The Funeral Is on Mundy"
1970	McCloud	Adrienne Redman	Episode: "Portrait of a Dead Girl"
1970–1972	Love, American Style	Various Roles	4 episodes
1971	NBC Children's Theatre	Herself	Episode: "Super Plastic Elastic Goggles"
1971	Bewitched	Ophelia	Episode: "The Eight Year Itch Witch"
1971	The Feminist and the Fuzz	Lilah McGuinness	Television film
1972	A Very Missing Person	Aleatha Westering	Television film
1973	Columbo	Lisa Chambers	Episode: "Double Shock"
1974	Fools, Females and Fun	Carla Dean	Television film
1975	ABC's Wide World of Mystery		Episode: "The Black Box Murders"
1975	McMillan & Wife	Luciana Amaldi	Episode: "Aftershock" (Credited as "Julie Neumar")
1976	The Bionic Woman	Claudette	Episode: "Black Magic"
1976	Monster Squad	Ultra Witch	Episode: "Ultra Witch"
1977	Terraces	Chalane Turner	Television film
1978	Jason of Star Command	Queen Vanessa	2 episodes
1979	The Love Boat	Marla Samms	Episode: "The Reunion/Haven't I Seen You?/Crew Confessions"
1980	Buck Rogers in the 25th Century	Zarina	2 episodes
1982	The Powers of Matthew Star	Nian	Episode: "The Triangle"
1982	CHiPs	Cora Dwayne	Episode: "This Year's Riot"
1983	Fantasy Island	Doralee	Episode: "King of Burlesque/Death Games"
1983	Hart to Hart	Eve	Episode: "A Change of Heart"
1984	High School U.S.	Stripper	TV pilot
1985	Half Nelson	Herself	Episode: "The Deadly Vase"
1995	Hope & Gloria	Herself	Episode: "Whose Poppa?
1996	Melrose Place	Herself	Episode: "Triumph of the Bill"
1998	Maggie	Catwoman	Episode: "If You Could See What I Hear"
2006	According to Jim	Julie	Episode: "The Grumpy Guy"
2010	Batman: The Brave and the Bold	Martha Wayne (voice)	Episode: "Chill of the Night!"

== Stage credits ==
- Alice in Wonderland (1940)
- Silk Stockings (1955)
- Ziegfeld Follies (1956) (closed on the road)
- Li'l Abner (1956)
- The Marriage-Go-Round (1958)
- Damn Yankees (1961)
- Once There Was a Russian (1961)
- Stop the World – I Want to Get Off (1963)
- Irma La Douce (1964)
- Damn Yankees (1965)
- Dames at Sea (1970)
- In the Boom Boom Room (1982)
- Li'l Abner (1998)

Batman role
1st	Catwoman actress 1966	Succeeded by Lee Meriwether
Preceded by Lee Meriwether	Catwoman actress 1967	Succeeded by Eartha Kitt
