= Instant Freeze =

- Batman episode
- Episode no.: Season 1 Episode 7
- Directed by: Robert Butler
- Written by: Max Hodge
- Production code: 8707-Pt. 1
- Original air date: February 2, 1966

Guest appearances
- Robert Hogan as Paul Diamante; Shelby Grant as Princess Sandra; Dan Terranova as Doctor Vince; John Willis as Newscaster; Bill Hudson as Photographer; Special Guest Villain: George Sanders as Mr. Freeze

Episode chronology
| ← Previous "Batman is Riled" | Next → "Rats Like Cheese" |

"Instant Freeze" is the seventh episode of the Batman television series in its first season, originally airing on ABC February 2 and repeated on May 18, 1966.

== Plot ==
The episodes opens with a mysterious stranger setting an ice rink on fire and then freezing the streets: he is then pursued by a policeman on a motorbike. Commissioner Gordon and Chief O'Hara deduce the criminal is Mr. Freeze and summon Batman to police headquarters. There, Mr. Freeze's backstory is revealed. Some time ago, during a fight between Batman and Freeze, then a criminal scientist called Dr. Art Schivel, the struggle only succeeded in overturning a large beaker of 'Instant Freeze' solution onto the villain. Now calling himself Mr. Freeze, Schievel is forced to live inside a super-cooled house designed to keep his body temperature at fifty degrees below zero (Fahrenheit), and only able to leave with the use of a special air-conditioned suit. Mr. Freeze decides to begin a rampage of revenge. He breaks into the Gotham City Diamond Exchange to steal some famous diamonds (otherwise known as 'ice'), but Batman and Robin, acting on a tip-off from Commissioner Gordon, arrive and attempt to stop him. However, Freeze's henchmen, Chill, Nippy and Mo, release five Batman and Mr. Freeze decoys, and in the resulting confusion the frozen felon makes his escape. Later, back at his hideout, Freeze makes plans to steal the Ghiaccio Circolo (Circle of Ice) Diamond from the visiting Princess Sandra of Molino.
