= Anne Baxter on screen and stage =

Screen and stage experience of Anne Baxter

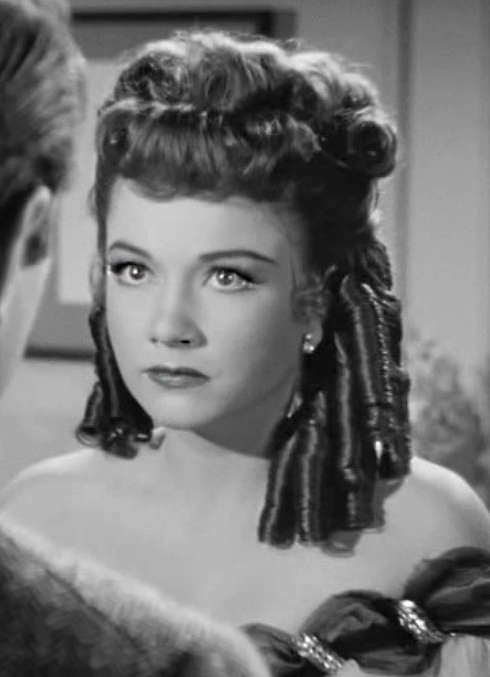
Baxter as Eve Harrington in All About Eve (1950)

Anne Baxter (1923–1985) was an American actress who had an extensive career in film, television, and on stage. She made her acting debut at the age of 13 on stage in the Broadway play Seen, But Not Heard in 1936. Four years later, Baxter starred in her first feature film, the western 20 Mule Team (1940). She appeared in Orson Welles' period drama The Magnificent Ambersons (1942), with Joseph Cotten and Dolores Costello, and followed this with a lead role in Billy Wilder's Five Graves to Cairo (1943). In 1946, she starred as a young woman suffering from alcoholism in the drama The Razor's Edge, for which she won the Academy Award for Best Supporting Actress. Two years later, Baxter appeared with Gregory Peck in the western Yellow Sky.

For her performance as Eve Harrington, an ambitious understudy, in Joseph L. Mankiewicz's All About Eve (1950), she received a nomination for the Academy Award for Best Actress. Three years later, Baxter starred in Alfred Hitchcock's film noir I Confess (1953). In the same year, she also appeared in the Fritz Lang-directed film noir The Blue Gardenia. In 1956, Baxter appeared as Egyptian princess Nefretiri in the Cecil B. DeMille-directed biblical epic The Ten Commandments, with Charlton Heston and Yul Brynner. Four years later, she received a star on the Hollywood Walk of Fame.

Her television debut was in the anthology series General Electric Theater in 1957. She went on to star in several anthology series, including The United States Steel Hour, The Alfred Hitchcock Hour, and The DuPont Show with June Allyson. During the late 1960s, Baxter played two villains in the Batman television series, and in 1969, she was nominated for the Primetime Emmy Award for Outstanding Lead Actress in a Limited Series or Movie for her role in The Name of the Game.

In 1971, Baxter made a return to Broadway theatre by starring as Margo Channing in Applause, a musical adaptation of All About Eve. Her last acting role was in the television series Hotel, where she starred as hotelier Victoria Cabot. (Note: She died in 1985, and her role in the series was retired.)

== Film ==
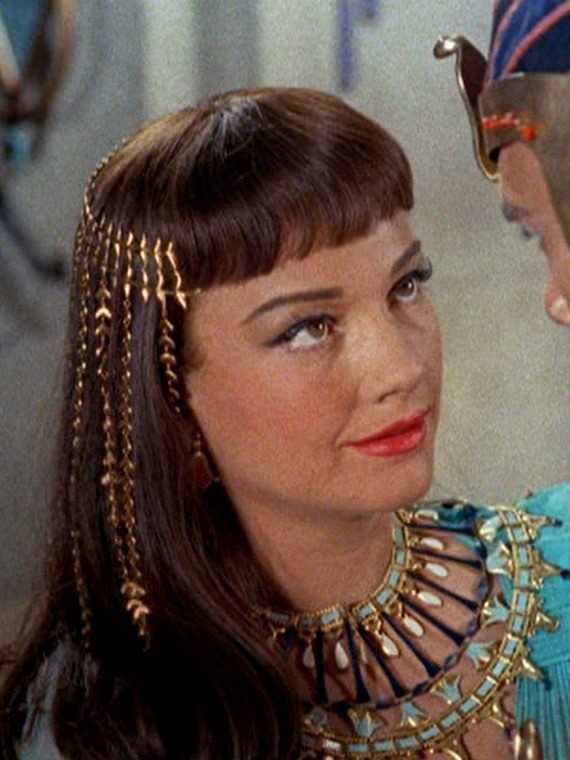
Baxter as Nefretiri in The Ten Commandments (1956)

List of film roles
Year	Title	Role	Notes	Ref(s)
1940	20 Mule Team	Joan Johnson		
1940	The Great Profile	Mary Maxwell		
1941	Charley's Aunt	Amy Spettigue		
1941	Swamp Water	Julie		
1942	The Pied Piper	Nicole Rougeron		
1942	The Magnificent Ambersons	Lucy		
1943	Crash Dive	Jean Hewlett		
1943	Five Graves to Cairo	Mouche		
1943	The North Star	Marina		
1944	The Fighting Sullivans	Katherine Mary Sullivan		
1944	The Eve of St. Mark	Janet Feller		
1944	Sunday Dinner for a Soldier	Tessa Osborne		
1944	Guest in the House	Evelyn Heath		
1944	The Purple Heart	Anne (voice)	Uncredited	
1945	A Royal Scandal	Countess Anna Jaschikoff		
1946	Smoky	Julie Richards		
1946	Angel on My Shoulder	Barbara Foster		
1946	The Razor's Edge	Sophie MacDonald		
1947	Blaze of Noon	Lucille Stewart		
1947	Mother Wore Tights	Narrator	Uncredited	
1948	Homecoming	Penny Johnson		
1948	The Walls of Jericho	Julia Norman		
1948	The Luck of the Irish	Nora		
1948	Yellow Sky	Constance "Mike" Mae		
1949	You're My Everything	Hannah Adams		
1950	A Ticket to Tomahawk	Kit Dodge, Jr.		
1950	All About Eve	Eve Harrington		
1951	Follow the Sun	Valerie Hogan		
1952	The Outcasts of Poker Flat	Cal		
1952	O. Henry's Full House	Joanna Goodwin	Segment: The Last Leaf; Anthology film	
1952	My Wife's Best Friend	Virginia Mason		
1953	I Confess	Ruth Grandfort		
1953	The Blue Gardenia	Norah Larkin		
1954	Carnival Story	Willie		
1955	Bedevilled	Monica Johnson		
1955	One Desire	Tacey Cromwell		
1955	The Spoilers	Cherry Malotte		
1956	The Come On	Rita Kendrick		
1956	The Ten Commandments	Nefretiri		
1957	Three Violent People	Lorna Hunter Saunders		
1958	Chase a Crooked Shadow	Kimberley Prescott		
1959	Summer of the Seventeenth Doll	Olive		
1960	Cimarron	Dixie Lee		
1962	Mix Me a Person	Anne Dyson		
1962	Walk on the Wild Side	Teresina Vidaverri		
1965	The Family Jewels	Actress in an in-flight movie	Uncredited	
1966	Seven Vengeful Women	Mary Ann	US Title: The Tall Women	
1967	The Busy Body	Margo Foster		
1971	Fools' Parade	Cleo		
1971	The Late Liz	Liz Addams Hatch		
1980	Jane Austen in Manhattan	Lilliana Zorska		

== Television ==
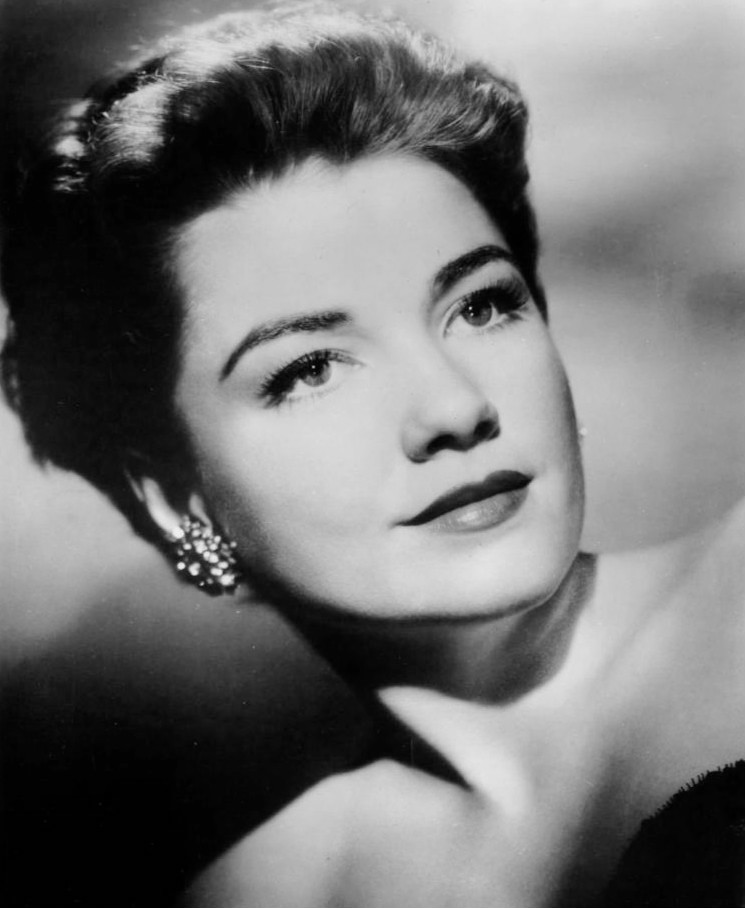
Baxter in the episode "The Shame of Paula Marsten" of The United States Steel Hour in 1961

List of television roles
Year(s)	Title	Role(s)	Notes	Ref(s)
1957- 1960	General Electric Theater	Major Edith Johansen / Stella Rutledge / Ella Harley	Episode: "Bitter Choice"; Episode: "Stopover"; Episode: "Goodbye, My Love"	
1958	Playhouse 90	Pat Bass	Episode: "The Right Hand Man"	
1958	Lux Playhouse	Delphine Murphy	Episode: "The Four"	
1959	Riverboat	Ellie Jenkins	Episode: "A Race to Cincinnati"	
1959	Wagon Train	Kitty Angel	Episode: "The Kitty Angel Story"	
1959	Dick Powell's Zane Grey Theatre	Laura Fletcher	Episode: "Hand on the Latch"	
1960	The DuPont Show with June Allyson	Louise	Episode: "The Dance Man"	
1960	Checkmate	Beatrice Kipp	Episode: "Death Runs Wild"	
1961	The United States Steel Hour	Paula Marsten	Episode: "The Shame of Paula Marsten"	
1963	The Alfred Hitchcock Hour	Janice Brandt	Season 2 Episode 2: "A Nice Touch"	
1964	Dr. Kildare	Nora Willis	Episode: "A Day to Remember"	
1965	The Loner	Agatha Phelps	Episode: "One of the Wounded"	
1966–1967	Batman	Zelda the Great / Olga, Queen of the Cossacks	Episode: "Zelda the Great" / "A Death Worse Than Fate"; Episode: "The Ogg and I" / "How to Hatch a Dinosaur"	
1967	Stranger on the Run	Valverda Johnson	Television film	
1967	My Three Sons	Eileen Talbot	Episode: "Designing Women"	
1967	Cowboy in Africa	Erica Holloway	Episode: "Search for Survival"	
1968	The F.B.I.	Katherine Daly	Episode: "Region of Peril"	
1968	Run for Your Life	Mona Morrison	Episode: "Life Among the Meat-Eaters"	
1968	Companions in Nightmare	Carlotta Mauridge	Television film	
1968	The Virginian	Nora Carlton	Episode: "Nora"	
1968- 1969	Ironside	Carolyn White / Alice Flynn	Episode: "An Obvious Case of Guilt"; Episode: "Programmed for Danger"	
1968- 1970	The Name of the Game	Magda Blain / Betty Jean Currier / Louise Harris	Episode: "The Protector"; Episode: "The Bobby Currier Story"; Episode: "The Takeover"; Episode: "All the Old Familiar Faces"	
1969- 1973	Marcus Welby, M.D.	Myra Sherwood / Julie Langley Kirk	Episode: "A Matter of Humanities"; Episode: "Madonna with Knapsack and Flute"; Episode: "A Necessary End"	
1969	The Big Valley	Hannah	Episode: "The 25 Graves of Midas"	
1970	The Challengers	Stephanie York	Television film	
1970	Ritual of Evil	Jolene Wiley	Television film	
1970	Bracken's World	Marian Harper	Episode: "Diffusion"	
1971	If Tomorrow Comes	Miss Cramer	Television film	
1972	The Catcher	Kate	Television film	
1973	Columbo	Nora Chandler	Episode: "Requiem for a Falling Star"	
1973	Cannon	Helen	Episode: "He Who Digs a Grave"	
1973	Love Story	Elaine McKinley	Episode: "All My Tomorrows"	
1973	Banacek	Leslie Lyle	Episode: "If Max Is So Smart, Why Doesn't He Tell Us Where He Is?"	
1973	Mannix	Victoria	Episode: "The Deadly Madonna"	
1973	Lisa, Bright and Dark	Margaret Schilling	Television film	
1976	The Moneychangers	Edwina Dorsey	Television miniseries	
1978	Little Mo	Jessamyn Connolly	Television film	
1979	Nero Wolfe	Rachel Bruner	Television film	
1980	Hagen	Claudette	Episode: "The Straw Man"	
1981	East of Eden	Faye	Television miniseries	
1981- 1985	The Love Boat	Priscilla Crawford / Helen Williams	Episode: "Model Marriage, A / This Year's Model / Original Sin / Vogue Rogue / Too Clothes for Comfort"; Episode: "Call Me Grandma / A Gentleman of Discretion / The Perfect Divorce / Letting Go"	
1983–1986	Hotel	Victoria Cabot	75 episodes	
1984	The Masks of Death	Irene Adler	Television film	

== Stage ==
List of theatre roles
Year(s)	Title	Role	Theatre	Notes	Ref.
1936	Seen, But Not Heard	Elizabeth Winthrop	Henry Miller's Theatre		
1938	There's Always a Breeze	Lita Hammond	Windsor Theatre		
1938	Madame Capet	Rosalie	Cort Theatre		
1957	The Square Root of Wonderful	Mollie Lovejoy	National Theatre		
1971–72	Applause	Margo Channing	Palace Theatre		
1974	Come Into the Garden Maud	Margo Channing	Ethel Barrymore Theatre	Two part play: Noël Coward in Two Plays	
1974	A Song at Twilight	Carlotta Gray	Ethel Barrymore Theatre	Two part play: Noël Coward in Two Plays	
1982	Hamlet	Gertrude	American Shakespeare Theatre		
