= Rats Like Cheese =

- Batman episode
- Episode no.: Season 1 Episode 8
- Directed by: Robert Butler
- Written by: Max Hodge
- Production code: 8707-Pt. 2
- Original air date: February 3, 1966

Guest appearances
- Robert Hogan as Paul Diamante; Shelby Grant as Princess Sandra; Dan Terranova as Doctor Vince; John Willis as Newscaster; Bill Hudson as Photographer; Special Guest Villain: George Sanders as Mr. Freeze

Episode chronology
← Previous "Instant Freeze"	Next → "Zelda The Great"

"Rats Like Cheese" is the eighth episode of the Batman television series in its first season. First broadcast on February 3 and re-aired on May 19, 1966 it continues and concludes the story that began in "Instant Freeze".

== Plot synopsis ==
In the previous episode, Dr. Art Schivel (also known as Mr. Freeze) left Batman and Robin frozen solid. An ambulance takes them to the Gotham City Hospital, where doctors use the "Super Hypotherm De-icifier Chamber Mark 7" to slowly restore their body temperature to normal levels. But Mr. Freeze has escaped with Princess Sandra's rare diamond, the "Giaclio Circlo".

From his frozen lair, Mr. Freeze learns of their rescue as he watches the news. A henchman enters and reports the success of "Operation: Beautiful Diamond", and Mr. Freeze commands him to bring "something" into the coldest part of the lair, where Freeze can survive without his suit and his men must keep to special "hot paths" or face death from the extreme cold. Watching further, Freeze sees Princess Sandra and Bruce Wayne throw out the first pitch at a baseball game. At that game, the scheduled pitcher, ace Paul Diamante, has tried to appear. A Tiger Moth biplane skywrites over the stadium, "Three Strikes, you're out Batman". It is another message from Mr. Freeze and Dick reveals that Diamante means "diamond" in Spanish.

Commissioner James Gordon tells Batman that three disreputable men visited Diamante earlier that day, and when his landlady entered to clean, the apartment was empty of people. She did find a note that read simply, "You will soon hear my terms" along with an icicle - clearly the work of Mr. Freeze. As the meeting continues, Freeze telephones, and informs the Commissioner, Chief Miles O'Hara, and Batman and Robin of his terms: for the safe release of Paul Diamante, he demands Batman in exchange and Batman agrees to come to Mr. Freeze.

Batman meets a helicopter, which drops off a chloroformed Diamante. The henchmen jump Batman and bundle him into the copter, then fly off with him. When he awakens inside Mr. Freeze's lair, he discovers that Freeze has stolen his utility belt. He promises Batman some kind of death, but whether it will be merciless or quick depends on Batman, and on how Mr. Freeze feels "when the time comes". Dr. Schivel clearly still holds Batman responsible for the accident that left him unable to withstand temperatures above 50 degrees below zero, and his ostracism from normal society. For the second time, Batman attempts to subdue Mr. Freeze, and twice he fails, overcome by the subzero temperatures in the cold zone which Mr. Freeze is perfectly comfortable.

Finally, Mr. Freeze guides Batman along a hot path into a dining room, where Batman discovers that the villain has captured Robin, who followed Batman to the lair. Mr. Freeze serves them a warm dinner of roast beef and spinach, with baked Alaska for dessert. He even offers a cordial after the meal, but of course Batman does not touch a drop of alcohol. Batman pleads with Mr. Freeze to turn himself to get medical attention for condition, but Freeze refuses to believe that would be possible in prison and admits that he will have to murder Robin as well since the boy knows his whereabouts. Following the meal, Mr. Freeze attends to that by reducing the hot zone to a tiny area, his goal to freeze Batman and Robin, slowly in revenge for his skin condition. When he leaves room for only one person, Batman orders Robin to remain inside and then suddenly knocks Mr. Freeze to the ground. Batman took the precaution of wearing his "Special Super B thermal underwear" as protection. His previous failures to subdue Dr. Schivel were simply feints, to throw him off guard. Seizing his control box, Robin quickly warms the entire room and Mr. Freeze begins to suffocate from the heat.

Robin creates a small zone of cold to contain Freeze safely, and then Freeze's henchmen appear. They threaten them with handguns, but a quick exposure to Mr. Freeze's preferred temperature convinces them to drop the weapons while a quick shift back to heat cuts short Freeze's interference. With the goons safely disarmed, Batman and Robin subdue them with fisticuffs before the police finally arrive to storm the hideout.

Later, Bruce Wayne hosts a reception for the rescued Paul Diamante, and for Princess Sandra, whose rare diamond has been returned to her. But Dick Grayson is not interested in the event's dessert course: Baked Alaska.

== Notes ==
- Teri Garr makes one of her first TV appearances in Part 1 of this 2-part story. She is at the beginning of "Instant Freeze".
- This episode features one of the scant few times that Robin actually disobeys an order from Batman.
- Despite the fact that no one but Mr. Freeze can survive in the extreme cold of his hideout, his butler seems to have managed it when he handed Freeze his sherry, as his hand can clearly been seen placing the glass down outside of the warm red area.
- The character of Doctor Schimmel/Mr. Freeze was based on the comic book villain Mr. Zero. DC changed Mr. Zero's code name to Mr. Freeze to match the TV show.
- The Victor Fries backstory of Mr. Freeze was created twenty-five years later in Batman: The Animated Series.
- This is the only appearance of George Sanders as Mr. Freeze.
- Dr. Vince is an obvious spoof on the 1961-66 ABC medical drama Ben Casey.
- This is the first time that the duo is unable to use its utility belts to escape from a trap.
- This episode featured actual baseball footage taken during the 1965 World Series.

Preceded by Instant Freeze (airdate February 2, 1966)	Batman (TV series) episodes February 3, 1966	Succeeded by Zelda The Great (airdate February 9, 1966)
