= William Hudson (actor) =

American actor (1919–1974)

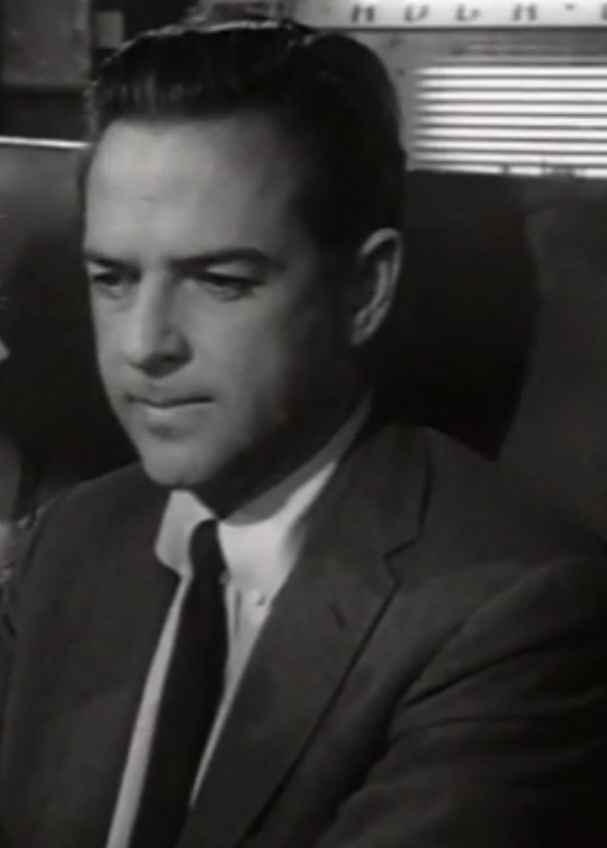
- Hudson in the trailer for Attack of the 50 Foot Woman (1958)
- Born: William Woodson Hudson Jr. January 24, 1919; Gilroy, California, U.S.
- Died: April 5, 1974 (aged 55); Los Angeles, California, U.S.
- Other name: Bill Hudson
- Occupation: Actor
- Years active: 1943–1971
- Relatives: John Hudson (twin brother)

William Woodson Hudson Jr. (January 24, 1919 – April 5, 1974) was an American actor. He played Ranger Clark in Rocky Jones, Space Ranger and Special Agent Mike Andrews in the Emmy Award nominated spy drama I Led Three Lives.

== History ==
After appearing uncredited in over a dozen movies, Hudson got his break in 1951's Hard, Fast and Beautiful. He appeared in a few other movies and TV shows before being cast as Special Agent Mike Andrews in I Led Three Lives. In 1954, while also still doing I Led Three Lives, Hudson was cast in the television serial Rocky Jones, Space Ranger as Ranger Clark.

After his stint as Clark on Rocky Jones, Hudson starred in several science fiction, fantasy, and monster movies, in such films as The She Creature, The Amazing Colossal Man. He played the husband in 1958's cult classic Attack of the 50 Foot Woman. In 1964 he was cast as the doomed first Captain of the Seaview, John Phillips, in the pilot episode of Voyage to the Bottom of the Sea. In 1965 he was back on Voyage as a different character in an episode infamous among fans of the series due to its heavy use of archive footage from the pilot episode (specifically a scene with Hudson and Richard Basehart leaving the Nelson Institute, being chased and attacked by a helicopter and which ended with the death of Hudson's character and the car going off a cliff aflame) giving him the dubious honour of being the only person "killed" on that show twice. In 1966 he was cast as a reporter in the second part of the first Television appearance of Mr. Freeze in a first-season episode of Batman titled "Rats Like Cheese". From then on he had several small parts in various movies and TV shows, his last part being Mr. Dunn in 1971's How's Your Love Life?.

He died at age 55 on April 5, 1974, in Woodland Hills, Los Angeles, California from cirrhosis. He was survived by his twin brother, actor John Hudson.

== Filmography ==
Year	Title	Role	Notes
1943	The Cross of Lorraine	French Soldier	Film role, Uncredited
1943	Destination Tokyo	'Copperfin' Intercom Man	Film role, Uncredited
1944	The Impostor	Pilot	Film role, Uncredited
1944	Weird Woman	Second Gossiping Male Student	Film role, Uncredited
1945	Objective, Burma!	Fred Hollis	Film role, Uncredited
1945	Over 21	Officer Candidate	Film role, Uncredited
1945	Pride of the Marines	Joe - Soldier in Hospital	Film role, Uncredited
1946	Lover Come Back	Worker at Styles Inc.	Film role, Uncredited
1949	The Lady Gambles	Horse Player	Film role, Uncredited
1949	The Red Menace	Passerby at Protest	Film role, Uncredited
1949	Task Force	Lt. Leenhouts	Film role, Uncredited
1949	Sands of Iwo Jima	Marine	Film role, Uncredited
1950	Father Makes Good	Thompson	Film role, Uncredited
1951	Hard, Fast and Beautiful	Intern	Film role
1951	Let's Go Navy!	Aide #1	Film role, Uncredited
1951	Starlift	Joe - Crew Chief	Film role, Uncredited
1952	The Steel Trap	Raglin, Bank Teller #2	Film role
1954	Trader Tom of the China Seas	James Dean	Film role, Uncredited
1954	The High and the Mighty	Reporter	Film role, Uncredited
1954	Rocky Jones, Space Ranger	Ranger Clark	TV series, guest role
1954	The Silver Chalice	Soldierin Chase	Film role, Uncredited
1955	Strategic Air Command	Forecaster	Film role, Uncredited
1955	The Eternal Sea	Communication Officer	Film role, Uncredited
1955	Air Strike	Lt. John Smith	Film role
1955	Mister Roberts	Olson	Film role
1955	The McConnell Story	Soldier in Office	Film role, Uncredited
1956	The Killer Is Loose	Detective on Stakeout	Film role, Uncredited
1956	The Man in the Gray Flannel Suit	Paratrooper	Film role, Uncredited
1956	The She-Creature	Bob, the ex-fiancé	Film role
1956	The Wrong Man	Police Lieutenant from 110th Precinct	Film role, Uncredited
1957	Battle Hymn	Navy Lieutenant	Film role
1957	The Man Who Turned to Stone	Dr. Jess Rogers	Film role
1957	Band of Angels	Officer	Film role, Uncredited
1957	Man of a Thousand Faces	David Anderson, Reporter	Film role, Uncredited
1957	The Amazing Colossal Man	Dr. Paul Linstrom	Film role
1957	My Man Godfrey	Howard	Film role
1953–1957	I Led Three Lives	Special Agent Mike Andrews	TV series, Recurring role on series
1958	Darby's Rangers	Operator	Film role, Uncredited
1958	Attack of the 50 Foot Woman	Harry Archer	Film role
1958	The Naked and the Dead	Major	Film role, Uncredited
1958	The Saga of Hemp Brown	Young Lieutenant	Film role, Uncredited
1958	The Last Hurrah	Votes Tallyman	Film role, Uncredited
1954–1958	Death Valley Days	Lester Allen Pelton / Elias Jackson Baldwin / Steve McIntyre	TV series, 3 episodes
1959	The Restless Gun	Episode "The Painted Beauty"	
1960	Bells Are Ringing	Party Guest	Film role, Uncredited
1960	The Great Impostor	FBI Man	Film role, Uncredited
1961	Wanted Dead or Alive	Sheriff	season 3 episode 16 (The last restreat)
1962	Moon Pilot	Space Flight Technician	Film role, Uncredited
1963	My Six Loves	Reporter	Film role, Uncredited
1965	Bus Riley's Back in Town	Country Club Bartender	Film role, Uncredited
1964–1965	Voyage to the Bottom of the Sea	Different guest roles	TV series, 2 episodes
1966	Moment to Moment	Officer	Film role, Uncredited
1966	The Oscar		Film role, Uncredited
1967	The Reluctant Astronaut	Fireman	Film role, Uncredited
1970	Airport	Mr. Donovan - Passenger	Film role, Uncredited
1970	Adam-12	Mr. Wall - Impersonates detective (in real life, his twin brother, John Hudson)	Season 2, Episode 16: "Impersonation"
1971	How's Your Love Life?	Mr. Dunn	Film role
