= Shelby Grant =

American actress (1936–2011)

- Born: Brenda Thompson; October 19, 1936; Orlando, Oklahoma, U.S.
- Died: June 25, 2011 (aged 74); Westlake Village, California
- Education: Northeastern State College
- Occupation: Actress
- Years active: 1963–1974
- Known for: Our Man Flint; Batman; Medical Center
- Spouse: Chad Everett (m. 1966)
- Children: 2

Shelby Grant (born Brenda Thompson; October 19, 1936 – June 25, 2011) was an American actress whose credits included Our Man Flint, Fantastic Voyage, and Medical Center.

== Early life ==
Grant was born on October 19, 1936, in Orlando, Oklahoma, to parents Lawrence and Mae Thompson. She was raised in Wagoner, Oklahoma, and completed high school at Wagoner High School.

Grant enrolled at Northeastern State College in Tahlequah, Oklahoma, where she studied drama and speech. She became Northeastern State's football queen in 1959. That year, she won the title of Northeastern Oklahoma Dairy Princess as well.

== Career ==
Grant appeared in local television commercials for Tulsa-based KTUL-TV after college. In 1962 she moved from Oklahoma to southern California to pursue an acting career. She initially worked as a teacher of special education and deaf students at Hollywood High School while trying to enter the entertainment industry.

Thompson was discovered by a 20th Century Fox talent scout, whereupon she changed her professional name to Shelby Grant. She "drew Shelby Grant out of a hat," according to an interview she gave to columnist Hedda Hopper.

She debuted on television in a 1963 episode of Bonanza. She soon became a contracted actor with 20th Century Fox. Her film roles under contract with Fox included The Pleasure Seekers in 1964, the 1966 science fiction film Fantastic Voyage, Our Man Flint in 1966, and The Witchmaker in 1969. Her television credits grew to include Batman (episodes 7 and 8) and Marcus Welby, M.D..

Grant married her husband, actor Chad Everett, in a ceremony held on May 22, 1966, in Tucson, Arizona. Everett had been on location in Tucson filming the 1967 movie Return of the Gunfighter at the time of their wedding. They had two daughters, Kate and Shannon. Grant appeared in her husband's television series Medical Center, in which he portrayed Dr. Joe Gannon from 1969 to 1976.

== Personal life ==
Grant and Everett had two daughters, Katherine Thorp and Shannon Everett.

She largely left acting to focus on philanthropy during her later life. Grant and her husband sponsored more than twenty heart surgeries for children.

Grant died of a brain aneurysm in Westlake Village, California, on June 25, 2011, at the age of 74. Everett died from lung cancer on July 24, 2012, at the age of 75, a little over a year after Grant's death. Both Grant and Everett were cremated at Valley Oaks Memorial Park; their ashes were taken by Katherine Thorp.

== Partial filmography ==
- Come Blow Your Horn (1963) – Party Guest (uncredited)
- The Pleasure Seekers (1964) – Marian, American Girl
- John Goldfarb, Please Come Home! (1965) – Harem Girl (uncredited)
- Batman TV series – Instant Freeze/Rats Like Cheese (1966) Princess Sandra.
- Our Man Flint (1966) – Leslie
- Fantastic Voyage (1966) – Nurse
- The Witchmaker (1969) – Maggie
