= List of Batman television series cast members =

The Batman franchise originating in DC Comics has had numerous television series. The list below presents the casts of television series in the franchise.

== Live-action ==
List indicators

This section includes characters who will appear or have appeared in Batman television series.

- An empty grey cell indicates the character was not in the film, or that the character's official presence has not yet been confirmed.
- ^{V} indicates a voice-only role.

Character	Batman	Birds of Prey	Gotham	Titans	Batwoman	Pennyworth	Gotham Knights	The Penguin
Character	1966–1968	2002–2003	2014–2019	2018–2023	2019–2022	2019–2022	2023	2024
Bruce Wayne Batman	Adam West (Note: This actor plays the same role in a film.)		David Mazouz Mikhail Mudrik	Alain Moussi Maxime Savaria Iain Glen	Warren Christie Kevin Conroy (Earth-99 Batman)		David Miller	
Richard "Dick" Grayson Robin	Burt Ward			Brenton Thwaites				
Alfred Pennyworth	Alan Napier	Ian Abercrombie	Sean Pertwee			Jack Bannon		
The Joker	Cesar Romero	Roger Stoneburner; Mark Hamill^{V}	Cameron Monaghan (as Jeremiah Valeska)	Mustafa Bulut	Nathan Dashwood Nick Creegan (Joker II)			
Barbara Gordon Batgirl/Oracle	Yvonne Craig	Dina Meyer	Jeté Laurence	Savannah Welch				
James Gordon	Neil Hamilton		Ben McKenzie					
Selina Kyle Catwoman	Julie Newmar Eartha Kitt	Casey Elizabeth Easlick	Camren Bicondova Lili Simmons					
Oswald Cobblepot The Penguin	Burgess Meredith		Robin Lord Taylor					Colin Farrell
Edward Nygma The Riddler	Frank Gorshin John Astin		Cory Michael Smith					
Dr. Victor Fries / Dr. Art Schivel Mister Freeze	George Sanders Otto Preminger Eli Wallach		Nathan Darrow					
Jervis Tetch The Mad Hatter	David Wayne		Benedict Samuel					
Chief O'Hara	Stafford Repp							
Harriet Cooper	Madge Blake							
Bookworm	Roddy McDowall							
Egghead	Vincent Price							
Professor William McElroy King Tut	Victor Buono							
Louie the Lilac	Milton Berle							
False Face	Malachi Throne							
The Clock King	Walter Slezak							
Marsha, Queen of Diamonds	Carolyn Jones							
Shame	Cliff Robertson							
Puzzler	Maurice Evans							
Lorelei Circe Siren	Joan Collins							
Lord Marmaduke Ffogg	Rudy Vallée							
Lady Penelope Peasoup	Glynis Johns							
Helena Wayne Huntress		Ashley Scott						
Dinah Redmond		Rachel Skarsten						
Jesse Reese		Shemar Moore						
Harleen Quinzel Harley Quinn		Mia Sara	Francesca Root-Dodson (as Ecco)					
Harvey Bullock			Donal Logue					
Sarah Essen			Zabryna Guevara					
Barbara Kean			Erin Richards		Sara J. Southey			
Renee Montoya			Victoria Cartagena		Victoria Cartagena			
Crispus Allen			Andrew Stewart-Jones					
Fish Mooney			Jada Pinkett Smith					
Leslie Thompkins			Morena Baccarin					
Theo Galavan Azrael			James Frain					
Tabitha Galavan Tigress			Jessica Lucas					
Lucius Fox			Chris Chalk		Domonique Adam (in a dream) Donny Lucas^{V} (A.I. voice)	Simon Manyonda		
Butch Gilzean Solomon Grundy			Drew Powell					
Harvey Dent Two-Face			Nicholas D'Agosto				Misha Collins	
The Executioner			Michael Chiklis (as Police Captain Nathaniel Barnes)		Jim Pirri (as Bertrand Eldon)			
Pamela Isley / Ivy Pepper Poison Ivy			Clare Foley Maggie Geha Peyton List		Bridget Regan			
Sofia Falcone Gigante			Crystal Reed					Cristin Milioti
Ra's al Ghul			Alexander Siddig					
Jonathan Crane Scarecrow			Charlie Tahan David W. Thompson	Vincent Kartheiser				
Bridgit Pike Firefly			Michelle Veintimilla Camila Perez					
Arthur Penn The Ventriloquist / Scarface			Andrew Sellon					
Carmine Falcone			John Doman					
Victor Zsasz			Anthony Carrigan		Alex Morf			
Hugo Strange			BD Wong					
Lazlo Valentin Professor Pyg			Michael Cerveris		Rob Nagle			
Eduardo Dorrance Bane			Shane West					
Clayface			Brian McManamon (Basil Karlo)			Dorothy Atkinson (Virginia Devereaux)		
Thomas Elliot Hush			Cole Vallis Gordon Winarick		Gabriel Mann			
Margaret Pye Magpie			Sarah Schenkkan		Rachel Matthews			
Roman Sionis Black Mask			Todd Stashwick (as Richard Sionis / The Mask)		Peter Outerbridge			
Nyssa Raatko			Jaime Murray					
Larissa Diaz Copperhead			Lesley-Ann Brandt					
Thomas Wayne			Grayson McCouch			Ben Aldridge		
Martha Wayne			Brette Taylor			Emma Paetz		
Stephanie Brown Spoiler					Morgan Kohan		Anna Lore	
Arthur Brown Cluemaster					Rick Miller		Ethan Embry	

== Animated ==
List indicators

This section includes characters who will appear or have appeared in Batman television series.

- An empty grey cell indicates the character was not in the film, or that the character's official presence has not yet been confirmed.
- ^{Y} indicates a younger version of the character.

Character	The Adventures of Batman	The New Adventures of Batman	DC animated universe			The Batman	Batman: The Brave and the Bold	Beware the Batman	Harley Quinn
Character	The Adventures of Batman	The New Adventures of Batman	Batman: The Animated Series	The New Batman Adventures	Batman Beyond	The Batman	Batman: The Brave and the Bold	Beware the Batman	Harley Quinn
Character	1968–1969	1977–1978	1992–1995	1997–1999	1999–2001	2004–2008	2008–2011	2013–2014	2019–present
Cast
Bruce Wayne Batman	Olan Soule	Adam West	Kevin Conroy (Note: This actor plays the same role in a film.)	Kevin Conroy	Kevin Conroy	Rino Romano	Diedrich Bader Zachary Gordon^{Y} Mikey Kelley^{Y} Dee Bradley Baker^{Y}	Anthony Ruivivar	Diedrich Bader
Barbara Gordon Batgirl / Oracle	Jane Webb	Melendy Britt	Melissa Gilbert	Tara Strong	Stockard Channing Angie Harmon	Danielle Judovits Kellie Martin (Oracle)	Mae Whitman	Tara Strong	Briana Cuoco
Alfred Pennyworth	Olan Soule		Clive Revill Efrem Zimbalist Jr.	Efrem Zimbalist Jr.		Alastair Duncan	James Garrett	JB Blanc	Tom Hollander
Dick Grayson Robin / Nightwing	Casey Kasem	Burt Ward	Loren Lester	Loren Lester		Eve Sabara (Note: Originally credited as Evan Sabara; Eve came out as a trans woman in 2020.) Jerry O'Connell (Nightwing)	Jeremy Shada Crawford Wilson (Nightwing) Lex Lang (Batman II)		
James Gordon	Ted Knight	Lennie Weinrib	Bob Hastings	Bob Hastings		Mitch Pileggi		Kurtwood Smith	Christopher Meloni
The Joker	Ted Knight	Lennie Weinrib	Mark Hamill	Mark Hamill		Kevin Michael Richardson	Jeff Bennett		Alan Tudyk
Oswald Cobblepot The Penguin	Ted Knight	Lennie Weinrib	Paul Williams	Paul Williams		Tom Kenny	Stephen Root		Wayne Knight
Victor Fries Mister Freeze	Ted Knight	Lennie Weinrib	Michael Ansara	Michael Ansara	Michael Ansara	Clancy Brown	John DiMaggio		Alfred Molina
Edward Nigma The Riddler	Ted Knight		John Glover	John Glover		Robert Englund	John Michael Higgins		Jim Rash
Jonathan Crane Scarecrow	Ted Knight		Henry Polic II	Jeffrey Combs			Dee Bradley Baker		Rahul Kohli
Jervis Tetch Mad Hatter	Ted Knight		Roddy McDowall	Roddy McDowall					
Selina Kyle Catwoman	Jane Webb	Melendy Britt	Adrienne Barbeau	Adrienne Barbeau		Gina Gershon	Nika Futterman		Sanaa Lathan
Bat-Mite		Lou Scheimer	Pat Fraley				Paul Reubens		
Clayface		Lou Scheimer Lennie Weinrib	Ron Perlman	Ron Perlman		Steve Harris Wallace Langham Lex Lang			Alan Tudyk Tom Kenny (Clayface's hand)
Harleen Quinzel Harley Quinn			Arleen Sorkin	Arleen Sorkin		Hynden Walch	Meghan Strange		Kaley Cuoco
Harvey Dent Two-Face			Richard Moll	Richard Moll			James Remar Richard Moll	Christopher McDonald	Andy Daly
Waylon Jones Killer Croc			Aron Kincaid	Brooks Gardner		Ron Perlman	Stephen Root	Wade Williams	Matt Oberg
Pamela Isley Poison Ivy			Diane Pershing	Diane Pershing		Piera Coppola	Jennifer Hale Vanessa Marshall		Lake Bell
Harvey Bullock			Robert Costanzo	Robert Costanzo					
Renee Montoya			Ingrid Oliu Liane Schirmer	Liane Schirmer					
Lucius Fox			Brock Peters	Mel Winkler		Louis Gossett Jr.			Phil LaMarr
Bane			Henry Silva	Henry Silva		Joaquim de Almeida Ron Perlman Clancy Brown	Michael Dorn		James Adomian
Ra's al Ghul			David Warner		David Warner		Peter Woodward	Lance Reddick	
Kirk Langstrom Man-Bat			Marc Singer			Peter MacNicol		Robin Atkin Downes	
Arnold Wesker Ventriloquist / Scarface			George Dzundza	George Dzundza		Dan Castellaneta			
Rupert Thorne			John Vernon			Victor Brandt			
Hugo Strange			Ray Buktenica			Frank Gorshin Richard Green			
Clock King			Alan Rachins			Dave Foley	Dee Bradley Baker		
Thomas Wayne			Richard Moll				Corey Burton Greg Ellis Adam West	Anthony Ruivivar	
Martha Wayne			Adrienne Barbeau				Pat Musick Julie Newmar		
Talia al Ghul			Helen Slater		Olivia Hussey		Andrea Bowen		
Maxie Zeus			Steve Susskind			Phil LaMarr			Will Sasso
Tony Zucco			Thomas F. Wilson			Mark Hamill			
Count Vertigo			Michael York			Greg Ellis			
Professor Milo			Treat Williams				Dee Bradley Baker		
Tim Drake Robin				Mathew Valencia					
Garfield Lynns Firefly				Mark Rolston		Jason Marsden	Robin Atkin Downes		
Thomas Blake Catman				Scott Cleverdon			Thomas F. Wilson		
Terry McGinnis Batman					Will Friedle				
Ace the Bat-Hound					Frank Welker		Dee Bradley Baker		
Derek Powers					Sherman Howard				
Inque					Shannon Kenny				
Spellbinder					John Cypher	Michael Massee			
Max Gibson					Cree Summer				
Dana Tan					Lauren Tom				
Mary McGinnis					Teri Garr				
Matt McGinnis					Ryan O'Donohue				
Melanie Walker					Olivia d'Abo				
Kal-El / Clark Kent Superman					Christopher McDonald	George Newbern	Roger Rose		James Wolk
Ellen Yin						Ming-Na Wen			
Roman Sionis Black Mask						James Remar	John DiMaggio		
Drury Walker Killer Moth						Jeff Bennett	Corey Burton		
Batwoman						Vanessa Marshall			
Lex Luthor						Clancy Brown	Kevin Michael Richardson		Giancarlo Esposito
J'onn J'onzz Martian Manhunter						Dorian Harewood	Nicholas Guest		
Oliver Queen Green Arrow						Chris Hardwick	James Arnold Taylor		
Barry Allen The Flash						Charlie Schlatter	Alan Tudyk		Scott Porter
Hal Jordan Green Lantern						Dermot Mulroney	Loren Lester		
Katar Hol Hawkman						Robert Patrick	William Katt		
Solomon Grundy						Kevin Grevioux	Diedrich Bader		
Tatsu Yamashiro Katana							Vyvan Pham Kim Mai Guest	Sumalee Montano	
Damian Wayne Robin							Patrick Cavanaugh		Jacob Tremblay
Anarky								Wallace Langham	
Lazlo Valentin Professor Pyg								Brian George	
Slade Wilson Deathstroke								Robin Atkin Downes	
Simon Stagg								Jeff Bennett	
Sapphire Stagg								Emmanuelle Chriqui	
Arthur Curry Aquaman							John DiMaggio		Chris Diamantopoulos
Jamie Reyes Blue Beetle							Will Friedle		
Patrick O'Brian Plastic Man							Tom Kenny		
Jonah Hex			Bill McKinney				Phil Morris		
Jason Blood Etrigan the Demon				Billy Zane			Dee Bradley Baker		
Jack Ryder The Creeper				Jeff Bennett			Brian Bloom		
Lois Lane						Dana Delany	Sirena Irwin		Natalie Morales
Jimmy Olsen						Jack DeSena	Alexander Polinsky		
Vicki Vale							Gabrielle Carteris		
Rex Mason Metamorpho							Scott Menville	Adam Baldwin	
