= A Death Worse Than Fate =

- Batman episode
- Episode no.: Season 1 Episode 10
- Directed by: Norman Foster
- Written by: Lorenzo Semple, Jr.
- Production code: 8705-Pt. 2
- Original air date: February 10, 1966

Guest appearances
- Jack Kruschen as Eivol Ekdol; Douglass Dumbrille as Doctor; Jerry Doggett as Announcer; Frankie Darro as reporter; Victor French as Hood No. I; William Phipps as Hood No. II; Special Guest Villain: Anne Baxter as Zelda the Great

Episode chronology
← Previous "Zelda the Great"	Next → "A Riddle a Day Keeps the Riddler Away"

"A Death Worse Than Fate" is the tenth episode of the Batman television series in its first season. This episode was first broadcast on ABC February 10 and rerun on June 23, 1966, and continues and concludes the story of Zelda the Great, a magician whose fading career has led her to crime. The story began in "Zelda the Great".

== Plot synopsis ==
From the previous episode, Zelda has kidnapped Aunt Harriet from Wayne Manor and demanded $100,000 for her safe return. Bruce Wayne must contact her within an hour, but the police cannot find the millionaire (because he is currently Batman). Batman tells Commissioner Gordon that he'll track Wayne down, and with just over 30 minutes remaining, Wayne reaches police headquarters. There he learns that Zelda has demanded he contact her by television. He and the police race to a nearby studio, where their broadcast interrupts regular programming.

Bruce Wayne, Commissioner Gordon, and Robin appear on the air, and offer a telephone number for the criminal to call, promising it will not be traced. Robin reveals that the counterfeit story was a ruse and that the criminal has real money, and Wayne confirms this. Robin appeals to whatever decency she has left, imploring her to release Aunt Harriet from being suspended over a tub of flaming oil. Zelda agrees to release her prisoner.

With police help, Aunt Harriet returns to Wayne Manor. Alfred, the Wayne butler, feels guilty, since he was below dusting the Batcave when Harriet received the false telephone summons, but Wayne advises his loyal servant to rid himself of guilt, for the kidnapping has enabled him to deduce the criminal's identity. This declaration surprises Robin, who does not understand how Batman arrived at this. Alfred also contributes a clue: a matchbook from the Gnome Bookstore that fell from Aunt Harriet's pocket. En route to the bookstore, Batman prompts Robin to recall Aunt Harriet's predicament, and after putting two and two together, Robin realizes who the criminal is: The suspended-over-flaming-oil escape was Zelda's signature trick when Bruce Wayne took Dick Grayson to see Zelda on Dick's last birthday.

At the Gnome Bookstore, Eivol Ekdol reveals to Zelda that there is no escape from his doom trap. He plans to lure Batman into the trap so the caped crusader will show him how to escape it. When Zelda questions how she can use the trap if Batman understands it, Ekdol tells her: "Dead men tell no tales!" He has hired two syndicate contract killers to assassinate Batman after he escapes the trap. Although highly reluctant to commit murder, Zelda has anticipated Ekdol's strategy: she planted the book of matches Alfred found to lure the Dynamic Duo to the bookshop, the doom trap, and their deaths. He hides the killers inside two mummy cases and the villains wait.

The bookstore is closed, but the door is unlocked. Batman and Robin enter, and quickly discover a note that leads them to a slim volume titled, "The Truth About Bats". Removing it from the shelf opens a concealed door into Eivol Ekdol's workshop and his "Inescapable Doom Trap". A fake bat inside leads the duo into the trap. The trap's space-age plastic resists the tools from their utility belts, deadly gas begins to pour in, and the floor vent is electrified. But the gas rises; Robin realizes it must contain hydrogen. Using their metal belt buckles, the Duo creates a spark and the exploding gas bursts apart the trap. As they're about to pass between the mummy cases concealing the machine gun equipped killers, Zelda warns them. They duck and the gangsters kill each other with crossfire. Ekdol tries to escape, but Batman knocks him out with a Batarang. A tearful Zelda surrenders, truly remorseful. While Ekdol is taken into custody, Zelda is granted her reprieve.

== Notes ==
- This episode was originally entitled "Zelda Takes the Rap".
- As the Dynamic Duo speed through Gotham City, the streets of New York's Times Square area are seen in the background, along with two movie theaters playing El Cid and Boys' Night Out.
- Victor French was best known for his role of Mr. Isaiah Edwards on Little House on the Prairie and as Mark Gordon on Highway to Heaven.
- There is an inside reference to the show as Alfred states his reason for not polishing the Batpoles on Wednesday evenings because of his obsession with a certain television show (part 1 of Batman aired on Wednesday nights at 7:30 on ABC).
- This is the first of two Batman story arcs in which there is no Batfight. The second is the Season 3 episode "Nora Clavicle and the Ladies' Crime Club".
- This is the first time that Bruce Wayne and Robin have a public conversation on the Batman TV series.
- Before the end credits, the brief preview announced the following week's villain would be the Joker, but instead the next two episodes featured the Riddler, the first return appearance by a Bat-foe.

Preceded by Zelda The Great (airdate February 9, 1966)	Batman (TV series) episodes February 10, 1966	Succeeded by A Riddle a Day Keeps the Riddler Away (airdate February 16, 1966)
