= Zelda the Great =

- Batman episode
- Episode no.: Season 1 Episode 9
- Directed by: Norman Foster
- Written by: Lorenzo Semple, Jr.
- Production code: 8705-Pt. 1
- Original air date: February 9, 1966 (ABC)

Guest appearances
- Stephen Tompkins as Bank Guard; Jack Kruschen as Eivol Ekdol; Frankie Darro as reporter; Barbara Heller as Hillary Stonewin; Jim Drum as Officer Clancy; Special Guest Villain: Anne Baxter as Zelda the Great

Episode chronology
← Previous "Rats Like Cheese"	Next → "A Death Worse Than Fate"

"Zelda the Great" is the ninth episode of the Batman television series in its first season, first airing on February 9 and rerun on June 22, 1966. It begins the story of Zelda the Great, a magician whose fading career has led her to crime. The story concludes in "A Death Worse Than Fate".

== Plot synopsis ==
For the third consecutive April Fools' Day, someone has robbed the Gotham City National Bank of exactly $100,000, passing up the chance to take other money worth nearly a half million dollars from the same vault. In two years, the Gotham Police Department has gotten nowhere with the case, leading Chief Miles O'Hara and Commissioner Gordon to call in the one man who can solve the mystery: Batman.

Batman has no leads, so he determines the right course of action is to manufacture a lead. He phones the Gotham paper and plants a story that the cash taken from the Gotham City National Bank was counterfeit, held there until authorities could destroy it. He hopes to force the criminal to strike again. Meanwhile, he analyzes a bullet found at the scene and discovers from it that the thief was wearing orange wool and dozens of colorful silk scarves. From a smear of ambergris he concludes that the criminal was a woman.

Meanwhile, in the secret workshop of Eivol Ekdol, behind the Gnome Bookstore, Eivol's client Zelda the Great meets with him. Each year she purchases, for $100,000, a new trick to re-invigorate her fading act. She complains: "Oh, I hate robbing banks. All I ever wanted to be was a poor, but honest, magician". This year, Ekdol has prepared a clever escape proof cabinet, but when Zelda asks how to escape it, he informs her that she will not even get into it unless she can produce $100,000 in real money. He shows her a newspaper article reporting that the Star of Sammarkand, a rare emerald, will be displayed. It is a tempting target and Zelda realizes this is a "Batman trap".

At Wayne Manor, Aunt Harriet Cooper receives a phone call from Miss Smith, a playground matron. It seems her fifteen-year-old nephew Dick Grayson has been struck in the head by a baseball and she has sent a special taxi to collect Mrs. Cooper and drive her to the playground.

At the jewelry salon, an elderly woman approaches the Star, and with a quick tap of her cane, releases a cloud of gas. It is Zelda in disguise and she has escaped with the Star. The stone is a counterfeit, and equipped with a homing device. Batman contacts Officer Clancy nearby and asks him to uncover the Batmobile. But outside, Robin finds the false stone in a gutter. Zelda's appearance here was a ruse. Then Batman receives a threatening phone call. It seems someone has kidnapped Aunt Harriet and demanded $100,000 for her safe release. As Commissioner Gordon continues, no one can find Bruce Wayne. It then shows Aunt Harriet at Zelda's hide out encased in a straitjacket suspended over a vat of boiling oil.

== Notes ==
- When Batman tells Commissioner Gordon to be on the lookout for a female suspect, Gordon seems shocked at the thought of a criminal being a female although Robin had mentioned Catwoman only seconds earlier.
- Robin's reference to the Catwoman marks the character's first mention in the series; Julie Newmar, however, would not make her first appearance as Catwoman for another 11 episodes.
- Though not the series' first reference to the Bat-Signal, it is the first time the Signal is used in concert with the hotline.
- For the first time, Batman and Robin are not part of the cliffhanger at the end of this episode; it is Aunt Harriet who is left hanging over a fire.
- This was Anne Baxter's first appearance on the show but her only one as Zelda. She later would appear in the final season as Egghead's paramour Olga, Queen of the Cossacks.
- Zsa Zsa Gabor and Bette Davis were considered for the role of Zelda. Gabor eventually wound up playing Minerva in the 1968 series finale, "Minerva, Mayhem and Millionaires".
- Frankie Darrow, who plays a newsman, had previously played in The Bowery Boys films.
- The episode includes a rare case of characters breaking the fourth wall, as both Zelda and Darrow's newsman character directly address the audience.
- This episode was originally entitled "The Inescapable Doom Trap".
- The episode is based on "Batman's Inescapable Doom-Trap!" from Detective Comics #346 by John Broome. Although the evil character Eivol Ekdal appeared in the story, Zelda did not; instead the magician was a man named Carnado.
- For once, the Dynamic Duo enter through the rear of Police HQ.

Preceded by Rats Like Cheese (airdate February 3, 1966)	Batman (TV series) episodes February 9, 1966	Succeeded by A Death Worse Than Fate (airdate February 10, 1966)
