= Max Hodge =

American screenwriter

Max Hodge (February 12, 1916 – August 17, 2007) was an American television writer who worked on shows including The Girl From U.N.C.L.E., CHiPS and Mission: Impossible, and is perhaps best known for creating Mr. Freeze for Batman.

Hodge grew up in East Moline, Illinois, and Michigan, later graduating from the University of Michigan then enlisting in the Navy during World War II. He then attended Pasadena Playhouse College of Theater Arts and began his television career in the 1950s as a producer working on industrial shows for Oldsmobile. In his time at University of Michigan- Ann Arbor, Hodge was chief editor of the student magazine the Gargoyle and president of the men's dramatic union, the Mimes.

His writing career spanned the 1960s through the early 1980s, with Hodge writing for Dr. Kildare, The Wild Wild West, Marcus Welby, M.D., Ironside, The Waltons, The Amazing Chan and the Chan Clan in addition to the aforementioned ChiPS, Mission: Impossible, The Girl From U.N.C.L.E. and Batman. He also served as an associate producer on The Girl From U.N.C.L.E.

Hodge is credited for creating Mr. Freeze for the Batman show, having taken the existing Batman comic character Mr. Zero which was created by Bob Kane and modifying elements to him. Mr. Zero first appeared in Batman #121 in February 1959, but Hodge took the character and introduced the trademark ice suit which he needed to survive, first appearing in the episode Instant Freeze. Mr. Freeze is addressed once as "Dr. Schimmel" by Batman in the episode. In the comics, Freeze's other identity became "Art Shivel" (apparently a mishearing of how he was addressed on "Batman"). His name in the comics was later changed to Victor Fries.

Hodge died August 17, 2007, in Woodland Hills, California. He was 91 years old. Most of his works, scripts, and related supplemental material(including his script for "Mr.Freeze") were donated to his alma mater and can be found in the Donald Hall Collection of University of Michigan.

== Filmography ==
=== Films ===
Year	Film	Credit	Notes
1972	The Night Stalker	Screenplay By (Uncredited)	Television Movie
1973	A Dream For Christmas	Screenplay By	Television Movie

=== Television ===
Year	TV Series	Credit	Notes
1965	Dr. Kildare	Writer	3 Episodes
1965	Valentine's Day	Writer	1 Episode
1966	Batman	Writer	4 Episodes
1966–67	The Girl from U.N.C.L.E.	Writer, Associate Producer	29 Episodes
1967	Hondo	Writer	1 Episode
1968	Mission Impossible	Writer	1 Episode
1968	The Wild Wild West	Writer	1 Episode
1969–76	Marcus Welby, M.D.	Writer	4 Episodes
1970	The Bold Ones: The New Doctors	Writer	1 Episode
1970	Medical Center	Writer	1 Episode
1971	Mannix	Writer	1 Episode
1971	Alias Smith and Jones	Writer	1 Episode
1971–72	Ironside	Writer	5 Episodes
1972	The Amazing Chan and the Chan Clan	Writer	9 Episodes
1974	Apple's Way	Writer, Story Editor	2 Episodes
1974	Cannon	Writer	1 Episode
1974	Maude	Writer	1 Episode
1975	Barbary Coast	Writer	1 Episode
1975	Caribe	Writer	1 Episode
1975–76	The Waltons	Writer	2 Episodes
1976–78	Police Woman	Writer	3 Episodes
1978	Quincy, M.E.	Writer	1 Episode
1978–80	CHiPs	Writer	2 Episodes
1979	Supertrain	Writer	1 Episode
1980	Eight Is Enough	Writer	1 Episode
1981	Palmerstown, U.S.A.	Writer	1 Episode
