= Mr. Freeze =

DC Comics supervillain

- Mr. Freeze as depicted in Batman #525 (December 1995). Art by Kelley Jones (pencils) and John Beatty (inks)

Publication information
- Publisher: DC Comics
- First appearance: As Mr. Zero: Batman #121 (February 1959); As Mr. Freeze: "Instant Freeze"; Batman (February 2, 1966); As Victor Fries: "Heart of Ice"; Batman: The Animated Series (September 7, 1992)
- Created by: As Mr. Zero: Dave Wood; Sheldon Moldoff; Bob Kane; As Mr. Freeze: Max Hodge; As Victor Fries: Paul Dini; Bruce Timm; Mike Mignola

In-story information
- Alter ego: Unknown (pre-Crisis version); Victor Fries (post-Crisis version)
- Species: Metahuman
- Place of origin: Gotham City
- Team affiliations: Injustice League; Secret Society of Super Villains; Legion of Doom; Suicide Squad; GothCorp
- Notable aliases: Dr. Victor Fries; Mr. Zero
- Abilities: Genius-level intellect; Sub-zero adaptation; Thermokinesis; Cryokinesis; Decelerated aging; Toxic immunity; Powered armor grants: Superhuman strength and durability; Wields cryogenic freeze gun

Mr. Freeze is a supervillain appearing in American comic books published by DC Comics. Created by writer Dave Wood and artists Sheldon Moldoff and Bob Kane, the character debuted in Batman #121 (February 1959) as Mr. Zero, a mad scientist with an unknown birth name who, after a physiology-altering mishap, becomes an ice-themed criminal typically armed with freezing weapons and an adversary of the superhero Batman forced to live in sub-zero temperatures and wear a special "cryo-suit" for survival. He was later renamed "Mr. Freeze" after the version featured in the 1966 Batman television series.

In 1992, Mr. Freeze was reinvented as a tragic villain by writer Paul Dini, producer Bruce Timm, and artist Mike Mignola for Batman: The Animated Series, which portrayed Victor Fries (pronounced "freeze") as a scientist in Gotham City who suffers a lab accident while trying to cryogenically preserve his terminally ill wife, Nora. He turns to crime to fund his research in his obsessive quest to cure Nora by any means necessary, which brings him into conflict with Batman. The animated revamped depiction of Mr. Freeze received widespread acclaim and redefined the character, providing such a burst in his popularity that DC Comics retroactively integrated the origin story conceived by Dini into the mainstream comic book continuity, and adapted it for almost every incarnation of the Batman franchise since.

As one of Batman's most enduring enemies belonging to the collective of adversaries that make up his rogues gallery, Mr. Freeze has been adapted in various media incarnations. He has been portrayed in film by Arnold Schwarzenegger in Batman & Robin (1997), and in television by George Sanders, Otto Preminger, and Eli Wallach in the 1966 Batman series, and Nathan Darrow in Gotham. Michael Ansara, Clancy Brown, Maurice LaMarche, and others have provided the character's voice in animation and video games.

== Creation and development ==
Created by Dave Wood, Sheldon Moldoff, and Bob Kane, the character made his first appearance in Batman #121 (February 1959) as "Mr. Zero", a criminal scientist whose experimental "ice gun" backfires and spills cryogenic chemicals on him, forcing him to wear a sub-zero suit for survival and transforming him into a gimmicky stock villain who commits ice-themed crimes. The name "Mr. Freeze" was first used when the character was adapted for the 1960s Batman television series, in which he was played by three different actors: George Sanders, Otto Preminger and Eli Wallach. Mr. Freeze debuted in the episode "Instant Freeze" on February 2, 1966, and his comic book counterpart was renamed in Detective Comics #373 (March 1968).

Nearly thirty years later, lead producers Paul Dini and Bruce Timm completely overhauled the character in Batman: The Animated Series. Artist Mike Mignola redesigned Mr. Freeze for the series at Timm's request, while Michael Ansara provided the character's voice. The episode "Heart of Ice", which was written by Dini and directed by Timm, aired on September 7, 1992, and retold Mr. Freeze's origin as Victor Fries, a scientist who turns to crime to find a cure for his cryogenically frozen, terminally ill wife, Nora. This revamped depiction of Mr. Freeze was critically acclaimed and led his characterization and backstory to be retconned into the mainstream comic book continuity.

== Fictional character biography ==
=== Pre-Crisis version ===
The Pre-Crisis version of Mr. Freeze's first appearance as "Mr. Zero" in Batman #121 (February 1959). Art by Curt Swan.

To create an ice gun, a scientist whose name remains unknown starts experimenting with a concentrated freezing solution. He suffers an unfortunate accident that changes his physiology, forcing him to live in environments below zero temperature. He adopts the criminal identity of Mr. Zero. To be able to go out to the normal environment, Zero creates an air conditioned costume, which helps him remain in cold temperatures, even in hot climates. Using this equipment, Zero gathers a small gang and starts a crime spree in Gotham City, stealing mainly diamonds and other precious jewels. Mr. Zero is eventually confronted by the local vigilantes, Batman and Robin. Unable to stand against his cold weapons, the Dynamic Duo fails to stop Zero. They are captured by him and brought to his secret cold hideout, near the mountains. Trapped in blocks of ice, Batman and Robin learn Zero's plan to steal a large collection of gems. Batman eventually breaks a nearby steam pipe, causing steam to fill the hideout, melting the ice away and apparently curing Zero from his ailment. After this, Batman and Robin are able to capture the whole gang and bring Zero to the authorities.

After years of inactivity, Zero's condition apparently returns. Going back to his life of crime, he changes his alias to Mr. Freeze and is forced to remain in cold temperatures once again. In this second exploit, Freeze redesigns his cryo-suit and improves his cryothermal gun. With a new gang, he starts a new series of crimes and steals valuable pieces of art. Similar to his first criminal activities, Freeze is eventually stopped by Batman and Robin.

Long after this, Freeze becomes part of a mock criminal trial.

Mr. Freeze later changes his cryo-suit with one that allows him more mobility. Freeze eventually falls in love with a woman called Hildy. To slow her aging process, Freeze sets out to recreate the accident that transformed him. For his experiments, Freeze uses wealthy people in Gotham as test subjects, but all the efforts result in failure. The victims turn into frozen zombies, who follow Freeze's commands. His new crimes alert the police and Batman. In the ensuing fight, Batman is only able to win when Hildy shows her true intentions and betrays Freeze, only to be encased in solid ice when her plan backfires.

Freeze's next plan consists of freezing Gotham City by removing all the heat and transporting the energy to the neighboring city of Metropolis. Freeze is unable to accomplish his goal and is stopped by Batman and Superman.

During one last attempt to freeze Gotham entirely, Mr. Freeze creates a large ice cannon. After robbing a bank, Freeze is confronted by Batman and the new Robin, who manages to defeat him with help from Vicki Vale and Julia Pennyworth, whom Freeze previously captured. {-}

=== Post-Crisis version ===
Following the 1985 "Crisis on Infinite Earths" storyline that rebooted DC Comics' continuity, Mr. Freeze's origin is retroactively revamped to match the one conceived by Paul Dini for Batman: The Animated Series. Dr. Victor Fries is a brilliant expert in cryogenics in Gotham City. As a child, he was fascinated with cryonic preservation and its potential to preserve and prolong life, and liked to freeze animals. His parents are horrified by his "hobby" and send him to a strict boarding school, where he is miserable, bullied and abandoned by his parents. As a result, he feels detached from humanity until going to college and meeting Nora, the woman he ultimately marries.

Eighteen months after Bruce Wayne becomes Batman, Nora contracts a fatal disease, so Fries begins developing a "freeze ray" for GothCorp to preserve her in suspended animation until a cure can be found. Fries' boss, Ferris Boyle, initially authorizes the experiment but eventually decides to seize the ray and sell it for his own profit. As Fries puts Nora in suspended animation, Boyle interrupts and tampers with the experiment, resulting in an explosion that kills Nora. Fries survives, but the chemicals in the freeze ray lower his body temperature to the point that he must wear a cryogenic suit to survive. He swears revenge on those responsible for the death of his wife (whom he talks to often) and becomes Mr. Freeze, the first superpowered villain whom Batman faces in this continuity. Eventually, Batman's hired operatives find Freeze, who shoots one of them with his freeze gun, but Batman eventually apprehends him.

During the "Underworld Unleashed" storyline, Mr. Freeze sold his soul to Neron in exchange for cryokinesis and temperature control, allowing him to survive in warm temperatures without use of his cryogenic suit. While opening a medical practice to cryogenically preserve elderly patients, Mr. Freeze was secretly planning to steal their assets causing his henchmen Ice and Cube to get concerned. Though Batman defeats Mr. Freeze, he ends up getting away. He would somehow revert to his pre-upgraded appearance causing him to sport a new cryogenic suit and wield a new freeze gun.

Initially locked in Arkham Asylum, Freeze was eventually transferred to the Gotham State Penitentiary, from where he escaped and attempted to steal technology from S.T.A.R. Labs until he was stopped and returned to prison by Batman.

During the "No Man's Land" storyline, Mr. Freeze sets up a base in the sewers which is stumbled upon by Gearhead and Tommy Mangles. Mr. Freeze finds them and uses his freeze gun on them after getting information about a storage room with canned food in it. He and Ratcatcher were defeated by Robin and arrested by Detective Mackenzie Bock with the Gotham City Police Department also bringing the frozen bodies of Gearhead and Tommy Mangles into their custody as well.

Freeze's crimes tend to involve freezing everyone and everything that he encounters so he forgoes alliances with the other criminals in Gotham, preferring to work alone. On rare occasions, he has worked with another member of Batman's rogues' gallery, usually, as an enforcer for Gotham's mob bosses, such as the Penguin during his reign or Black Mask during the return of Jason Todd.

In one of his notable team-ups, Freeze constructs a cryogenic machine for Hush so that Hush might take revenge on Batman, Freeze's equipment allowing Hush to preserve Catwoman's surgically removed heart to use as a means of threatening her life.

During the "Infinite Crisis", Mr. Freeze appears as a member of Alexander Luthor Jr.'s Secret Society of Super Villains.

After Batman's death, most of the Arkham inmates were freed by a new Black Mask. Freeze was among them and he started working on a project called Ice-X Protocol when the GCPD tried to capture him. He stunned them with his gun and captured Gordon, taking him to his secret lair. Gordon managed to break free and defeat Freeze by causing an explosion that weakened Freeze. After his capture, Freeze was taken to Iron Heights Prison.

During the "Salvation Run" storyline, Mr. Freeze is among the villains who are sent to another planet by a Boom Tube by the Suicide Squad.

Mr. Freeze fashions a sub-zero machine for Nyssa al Ghul in exchange for the use of her Lazarus Pit. He attempts to restore Nora to life without waiting for the adjusting needed in the pool chemicals; she returns to life as the twisted Lazara and escapes. She blames her husband for her plight, and she estranges herself from him.

==== The New 52 ====
Mr. Freeze in Batman Annual (vol. 2) #1 (July 2012). Art by Jason Fabok and Peter Steigerwald.

In September 2011, "The New 52" rebooted DC's continuity. In this new timeline, during the "Night of the Owls" storyline, the Court of Owls sends assassins known as Talons to kill 40 of the most important citizens of Gotham, including Mr. Freeze. Red Hood, Starfire, and Arsenal choose to save him, and subsequently remand him into Batgirl's custody. Batman Annual (vol. 2) #1 introduces a new origin for Mr. Freeze. Here, Victor Fries' fascination with cryonics began when he was a boy and his mother fell through the ice of a frozen lake. The ice was able to keep her preserved long enough for help to arrive, thus sparking his lifelong obsession with cold. It is later revealed that the accident left Fries' mother in constant pain, and Fries ended her suffering by pushing her into the same frozen lake. In this new origin, Nora was never Fries' wife. Her name was Nora Fields, a woman born in 1934. When Nora was 23, she was diagnosed with an incurable heart disease, so her family placed her in cryogenic stasis hoping that a cure would be found in the future. Fries, having written his doctoral thesis on Nora, took on a position as a cryogenic researcher and technician at Wayne Enterprises, the facility that housed Nora's body. Eventually, he fell in love with Nora and became dedicated to finding a reliable method for slowly thawing cryogenic subjects. However, Bruce Wayne ordered the project to be shut down, as he began to feel uncomfortable with Fries' obsession with Nora. Furious, Fries hurled a chair at Wayne, who dodged the attack; the chair smashed into an array of cryonic chemical tanks, the contents of which sprayed onto Fries and transformed him into Mr. Freeze.

The Court of Owls uses Freeze's cryogenic-thaw formula to revive their Talons, and then they try to kill him. Freeze survives but is captured by the Red Hood and sent to Arkham Asylum. He escapes shortly afterward and rearms himself with the Penguin's help. Freeze decides to kill Bruce Wayne and takes Nora, whom he believes to be his wife so that they can leave Gotham City behind forever. Infiltrating Wayne Enterprises, Freeze has a brief fight with Nightwing and Robin, but he subdues them. Then, Freeze goes to the penthouse, where he finds Batman and the frozen Nora. Batman defeats Mr. Freeze by injecting his suit with the thawing formula, which he had intended to use to revive Nora from suspended animation.

During the "Forever Evil" storyline, Mr. Freeze appears as a member of the Secret Society of Super Villains. Mr. Freeze and Clayface later encounter the Rogues when they land in their territory. Mr. Freeze tells Mirror Master he is not interested in capitalizing on the bounty on their heads, only to use the Weather Wizard to create optimal conditions for him to freeze Gotham. As the Rogues are fighting the two, Black Mask (alongside his False Face Society) arrives to capture the Rogues to receive the bounty.

==== DC Rebirth ====
In 2016, DC Comics implemented a relaunch of its books called "DC Rebirth" which restored its continuity to a form much as it was prior to "The New 52". In Doomsday Clock, Mr. Freeze is among the villains who meet with the Riddler to discuss the Superman Theory. When the Comedian crashes the meeting, Freeze's helmet is punctured by a bullet shot by an unseen combatant. In the "Ends of the Earth" story arc of All-Star Batman, Freeze has awoken many people who have been held in cryogenic stasis — using them as an army to steal resources for his research to cure his wife Nora, himself, and all of these people — and plans to release deadly bacteria held in one of the world's oldest ice cores to make a new world, but Batman has injected himself with a cold-resistant virus that becomes airborne when his skin is exposed and is able to kill the spores.

In "Dark Nights: Metal", Mr. Freeze was given a special playing card by The Batman Who Laughs that gave him innate cryokinesis. Mr. Freeze and his frost monsters fought different superheroes who moved through his domain. Robin is the one who defeated Mr. Freeze and he regressed back to normal when the threat of the Dark Multiverse was sent back to its own dimension.

Several years later, in "Year of the Villain", Lex Luthor gives Mr. Freeze a vial that would cure and furthermore revive his frozen wife. Freeze had to kidnap several women who matched his late wife's characteristics in both mental and physical states, going as far as modifying their DNA to hers to experiment with the vial before reviving his wife. In the end, it worked and his wife came back to life cured. She soon took up the name "Mrs. Freeze". After Mrs. Freeze betrayed him, Mr. Freeze turned to Batman for help. During the fight, Mrs. Freeze used a syringe on Mr. Freeze, which started to heat him up while also eradicating the special nanites that kept him cold without the assistance of his cryogenic suit. Batman places Mr. Freeze in the same cryogenic state that Nora was in while Mrs. Freeze flees to the northern parts of Canada.

== Powers and abilities ==
Like most Batman villains, Mr. Freeze's crimes are often centered around a specific theme; in his case, ice, cold and snow. The lab accident that bathed him in chemical coolants radically altered his biology and lowered his body temperature to 23 degrees Fahrenheit, transforming him into a metahuman who is impervious to sub-freezing temperatures and incapable of surviving outside of them. As a result, anything Freeze's skin comes into contact with will freeze. He can generate ice around his body, encase an entire person's body in ice simply by touching them, and cause ice to rapidly form along structures through physical contact. The demon Neron briefly grants Freeze the ability to generate absolute zero temperatures around him, though his body is soon reverted to its original sub-zero state. Since the chemicals he was exposed to were meant for cryo-stasis, Freeze's aging has been decelerated to the point that he is considered to be virtually immortal, and he is immune to most toxins, bacteria, viruses, and illnesses.

Freeze possesses a genius-level intellect and a gifted scientific mind. He is an expert in physics, chemistry, neurobiology, medicine, and mechanical engineering, having built his own specialized cryogenic suit and equipment to keep his body temperature below freezing, as well as a "freeze ray" gun capable of creating gusts of cold that approach absolute zero. Freeze's armored suit also increases his strength and durability to superhuman levels. His inventions have been described as being as technologically advanced as that of Apokolips or Lex Luthor.

== Reception ==
IGN's list of the Top 100 Comic Book Villains of All Time List ranked Mr. Freeze as #67.

== Other characters named Mr. Freeze ==
=== Robot Mr. Freeze ===
In Blackhawk, Mr. Freeze appears as a robot created and controlled by Professor Thurman to pose as a villain so that Thurman could use his "Instant Freeze Icing Machine" invention to commit crimes without incriminating himself, but the plan is eventually foiled by the Blackhawks and Thurman is arrested.

=== Earth-Two Mr. Zero ===
An issue of The Brave and the Bold revealed that there was a criminal on Earth-Two who also operated as Mr. Zero. While not much is known about Earth-Two's Mr. Zero, his freeze gun was among the weaponry used by Earth-Two's Hugo Strange to attack Robin, Batwoman, and Batman of Earth-One.

== Other versions ==
=== "Flashpoint" ===
An alternate timeline version of Victor Fries / Mr. Freeze appears in the "Flashpoint" tie-in, Flashpoint: Citizen Cold. This version is a friend of Fallout and an enemy of the eponymous Citizen Cold, who later kills Freeze. Additionally, Freeze's motivations revolve around seeking a cure for Fallout's radioactive powers.

=== Batman/Teenage Mutant Ninja Turtles ===
An alternate universe version of Victor Fries / Mr. Freeze appears in Batman/Teenage Mutant Ninja Turtles. After being exposed to mutagen by the Shredder, Freeze is mutated into an anthropomorphic polar bear and joins other mutated Arkham Asylum inmates to attack Batman and Robin before the inmates are defeated by Splinter. Sometime later, the inmates are stated to have been cured and taken into A.R.G.U.S. custody.

=== Batman: White Knight ===
An alternate universe version of Victor Fries appears in Batman: White Knight. This version retired from his criminal lifestyle to focus on curing his wife Nora Fries' disease. Additionally, his cryogenically mutated physiology considerably slowed his body's aging process. Years prior, Victor's unnamed father and Nora's father, Jacob Smithstein, worked as cryogenic researchers in interwar Germany. Amidst the rise of the Nazis, Victor's father joined them as an SS officer and became cold and abusive towards Victor. After being conscripted to experiment on Jewish prisoners using cryotech, Victor helped the Smithsteins escape, during which Jacob was shot and made Victor promise to protect Nora. After arriving in the U.S., Victor would go on to help deliver Bruce Wayne after the latter's mother Martha went into premature labor and attempt to save Alfred Pennyworth.

=== Victor and Nora: A Gotham Love Story ===
An alternate universe version of Victor Fries appears in the DC Graphic Novels for Young Adults novel Victor and Nora: A Gotham Love Story, written by Lauren Myracle and with art by Isaac Goodhart.

=== Absolute Batman ===
An alternate universe version of Victor Fries appears in Absolute Batman. This version was a pioneer in cryotechnology and creator of the company V-Core before he and Nora were cryogenically frozen and succeeded by their son, Victor Fries, Jr., an employee of the Joker who possesses a freezing touch.

== See also ==
- List of Batman family enemies
