= Batman (TV series) =

1966 American superhero comedy television series

- Genre: Superhero; Comedy
- Created by: William Dozier
- Based on: Batman by: Bob Kane (credited) and Bill Finger (uncredited)
- Developed by: Lorenzo Semple Jr.
- Starring: Adam West; Burt Ward; Alan Napier; Neil Hamilton; Stafford Repp; Madge Blake; Yvonne Craig; Cesar Romero; Burgess Meredith; Frank Gorshin; John Astin; Julie Newmar; Eartha Kitt; Victor Buono; David Wayne; Vincent Price; Carolyn Jones; Cliff Robertson; Anne Baxter
- Narrated by: William Dozier
- Opening theme: "Batman Theme" by Neal Hefti
- Composers: Nelson Riddle Billy May (third season) Warren Barker (two episodes)
- Country of origin: United States
- Original language: English
- No. of seasons: 3
- No. of episodes: 120 (list of episodes)

Production
- Executive producer: William Dozier
- Producer: Howie Horwitz
- Editor: Byron Chudnow
- Camera setup: Single-camera
- Running time: 25 minutes
- Production companies: Greenway Productions; 20th Century-Fox Television

Original release
- Network: ABC
- Release: January 12, 1966 – March 14, 1968

Batman is an American superhero comedy television series created by William Dozier based on the DC Comics character of the same name that aired on ABC for three seasons and 120 episodes from January 12, 1966, to March 14, 1968.

It stars Adam West as Bruce Wayne/Batman and Burt Ward as Dick Grayson/Robin—two crime-fighting heroes who defend Gotham City from a variety of archvillains.

Known for its camp style and upbeat theme music, as well as its intentionally humorous, simplistic morality aimed at its preteen audience, the show aired twice weekly during the first two seasons, and weekly for the third. A companion feature film was released in 1966 between the first and second seasons of the show.

Batman had the most episodes of a superhero television series (120 episodes) until it was surpassed by Smallville in 2007 (217 episodes).

== Overview ==
The series centers on "millionaire playboy" Bruce Wayne and his "youthful ward" Dick Grayson who, in the guise of their alter-egos Batman and Robin, defend Gotham City from various arch-criminals. Although the lives of their true identities are frequently shown, it is usually only briefly, in the context of their being called away on superhero business or in circumstances where they need to employ their actual identities to assist in their crime-fighting. The "Dynamic Duo" typically comes to the aid of the Gotham City Police Department upon the latter being stumped by a supervillain, who is usually accompanied in their appearances by several henchmen, often with nicknames themed around the criminal or the crime, and, in the case of male villains, an attractive female companion. Throughout each episode, Batman and Robin follow a series of seemingly improbable clues (also known as "bat logic") to discover the supervillain's plan, then figure out how to thwart that plan and capture the criminal.

For the first two seasons, Batman was broadcast twice a week, on consecutive nights. Every story is in two parts, except for two three-parters featuring villainous team-ups (the Joker and the Penguin, then the Penguin and Marsha, Queen of Diamonds) in the second season. The titles of each multi-part story usually rhyme. The third and final season, which aired one episode a week and introduced Yvonne Craig as Barbara Gordon/Batgirl, consists of self-contained stories. Each third-season story ends with a teaser featuring the next episode's guest villain, except for the series finale. The cliffhangers between multiple-part stories consist of villains holding someone captive, usually Batman and/or Robin, with the captive(s) being threatened by death, serious injury, or another fate. These cliffhangers are resolved early in follow-up episodes, with captives escaping the traps.

Ostensibly a crime series, the show's style is intentionally campy and tongue-in-cheek. It exaggerates serious and tense circumstances, playing them for laughs, while the characters take the ludicrous situations very seriously.

== Cast and characters ==
=== Regular cast ===
- Adam West as Bruce Wayne/Batman:
  A multi-millionaire industrialist whose parents were murdered when he was a child and who now secretly uses his vast fortune to fight crime as the superhero Batman. Producer William Dozier cast Adam West in the role after seeing him perform as the James Bond-like spy Captain Q in a Nestlé Quik television commercial. Lyle Waggoner had screen-tested for the role, though West ultimately won out because, it was said, he was the only person who could deliver his lines with a straight face. West later voiced an animated version of the title character on The New Adventures of Batman while Waggoner would appear in a later superhero TV series of his own, as Steve Trevor in Wonder Woman.
- Burt Ward as Dick Grayson/Robin:
  Batman's sidekick, dubbed the "Boy Wonder," is a high school student noted for his recurring interjections in the form of "Holy ________, Batman!" The series avoids referencing Robin's origins as Bruce Wayne's fellow "crime orphan" and Wayne's appointment as Dick Grayson's legal guardian. Ward later voiced this character on the 1977 animated TV series The New Adventures of Batman.
- Alan Napier as Alfred:
  Batman's loyal butler and Batgirl's discreet confidant. He is the only person who knows the true identities of Bruce Wayne, Dick Grayson, and Barbara Gordon.
- Neil Hamilton as Commissioner Gordon:
  The Commissioner of the Gotham City Police Department and one of Batman's two primary police contacts. He summons the Dynamic Duo via the Batphone or the Bat Signal.
- Stafford Repp as Chief O'Hara:
  Gotham City's Chief of Police and Batman's other primary police contact. The character was created by Semple for the series as someone for Gordon to talk to and later briefly added to the comics. In 2013, DC revealed this incarnation's first name as "Miles" in their Batman' 66 comics.
- Madge Blake as Harriet Cooper:
  Dick Grayson's maternal aunt. She first appeared in the comics two years prior to the series to give Bruce and Dick a reason to be secretive about their dual identities.
- Yvonne Craig as Barbara Gordon / Batgirl:
  Commissioner Gordon's daughter, Gotham City librarian, and crime-fighting partner for Batman and Robin in the third season. Occasionally, this threesome was nicknamed the "Terrific Trio".
- William Dozier (uncredited) as the Narrator.

According to West's memoir Back to the Batcave, his first exposure to the series concept was through reading a sample script in which Batman enters a nightclub in full costume and requests a booth near the wall, as he "shouldn't wish to attract attention". The scrupulously formal dialogue and the way that Batman earnestly believed he could avoid standing out while wearing a skintight blue-and-grey costume convinced West of the character's comic potential.

=== Recurring villains ===
- Cesar Romero as The Joker:
  A clown-themed, prank-loving villain and Batman's arch-enemy who leaves behind jokes as clues to his crimes.
- Burgess Meredith as The Penguin:
  A penguin-themed gentleman thief who commits crimes using multipurpose umbrellas.
- Frank Gorshin (seasons 1 and 3) and John Astin (season 2) as The Riddler:
  A criminal who leaves behind riddles as clues to his crimes.
- Julie Newmar (seasons 1–2), Eartha Kitt (season 3), and Lee Meriwether (1966 Batman movie) as The Catwoman:
  A cat-themed jewel thief and cat burglar in a complicated love-hate relationship with Batman.
- Victor Buono as Professor William McElroy / King Tut:
  An Egyptologist who developed a split personality after being struck on the head during a student protest. Each time he is hit on the head, he switches between the personalities of a university professor and a reincarnated version of the pharaoh Tutankhamun.
- George Sanders (season 1), Otto Preminger and Eli Wallach (season 2) as Dr. Art Schivel / Mr. Freeze:
  A mad scientist who now needs sub-zero temperatures to survive after exposure to a freeze solution. His weapon of choice is a freeze-blast gun, capable of freezing its target solid. In his first appearance, the gun can also produce a heat/incendiary beam.
- David Wayne as Jervis Tetch / The Mad Hatter:
  A formally dressed villain with an obsession for collecting hats (he steals the hats from his victims, then knocks them out with a mesmerizing ray that pops out of the top of his hat).
- Vincent Price as Egghead:
  A smug, bald genius whose crimes and speech patterns involve eggs.
- Carolyn Jones as Marsha, Queen of Diamonds:
  A criminal with a fondness for jewelry. In all her appearances, she is always accompanied by her Aunt Hilda (Estelle Winwood), a brilliant former chemisty professor at Vassar College who has convinced herself to be a witch.
- Cliff Robertson as Shame:
  A Western-themed villain whose partners at various times include Okie Annie and Calamity Jan. The three of them spoof famous Western characters from the movies (namely Shane, Annie Oakley, and Calamity Jane).
- Anne Baxter as Olga, Queen of the Cossacks:
  A Russian villainess often paired with Egghead. Before this role, Baxter appears in one story as "Zelda the Great", a magician criminal.
- Milton Berle as Louie the Lilac:
  A gangster with a fondness for flowers.

Producers developed several tentative scripts for Two-Face but never produced any of them. Clint Eastwood was allegedly considered for the role shortly before the series was canceled.

== Episodes ==
Season	Episodes	Story arcs	Originally released	
Season	Episodes	Story arcs	First released	Last released
1	34	17	January 12, 1966	May 5, 1966
2	60	29	September 7, 1966	March 30, 1967
3	26	20	September 14, 1967	March 14, 1968

== Production ==
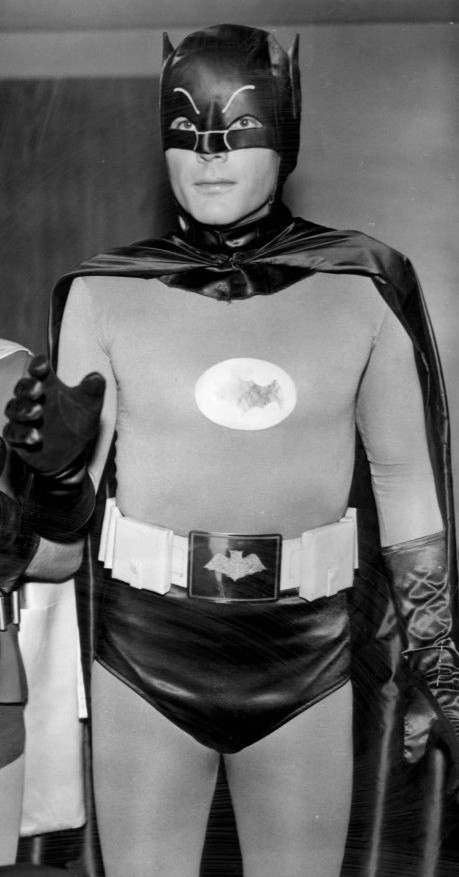
Adam West as Batman

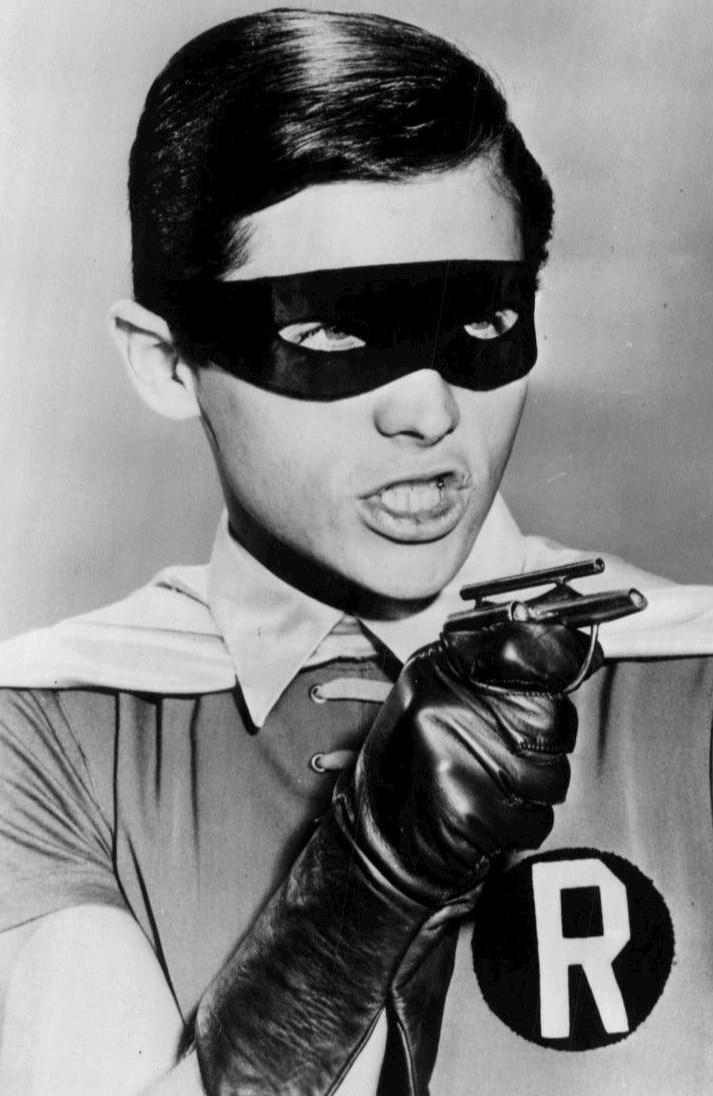
Burt Ward as Robin

=== Origin ===
In the early 1960s, Ed Graham Productions optioned the television rights to the comic book Batman and planned a straightforward juvenile adventure show much like Adventures of Superman and The Lone Ranger, to air on CBS on Saturday mornings.

East Coast ABC executive Yale Udoff, a Batman fan in his childhood, contacted ABC executives Harve Bennett and Edgar J. Scherick, who were already considering developing a television series based on a comic-strip action hero, to suggest a prime-time Batman series in the hip and fun style of The Man from U.N.C.L.E.

As well, in 1964, film buff Hugh Hefner screened all 15 chapters of the 1943 Batman serial at the Playboy Mansion. The trendy event received much notice in the press, prompting Columbia to offer the unedited serial to theaters in 1965 as An Evening with Batman and Robin in one long, marathon showing. This re-release was successful enough to inspire the development of a television series based on the property. When negotiations between CBS and Graham stalled, DC Comics quickly reobtained the rights and made a deal with ABC, which farmed the rights out to 20th Century Fox to produce the series.

In turn, 20th Century Fox handed the project to William Dozier and his production company, Greenway Productions. ABC and Fox expected a hip, fun, yet serious adventure show. However, Dozier, who had never before read comic books, concluded, after reading several Batman comics for research, that the only way to make the show work was to do it as a pop-art campy comedy. Originally, espionage novelist Eric Ambler was to have scripted a TV movie that would launch the television series. However, he dropped out after learning of Dozier's campy comedy approach. Eventually, two sets of screen tests were filmed, one with Adam West and Burt Ward and the other with Lyle Waggoner and Peter Deyell, with West and Ward winning the roles.

=== Season 1 ===
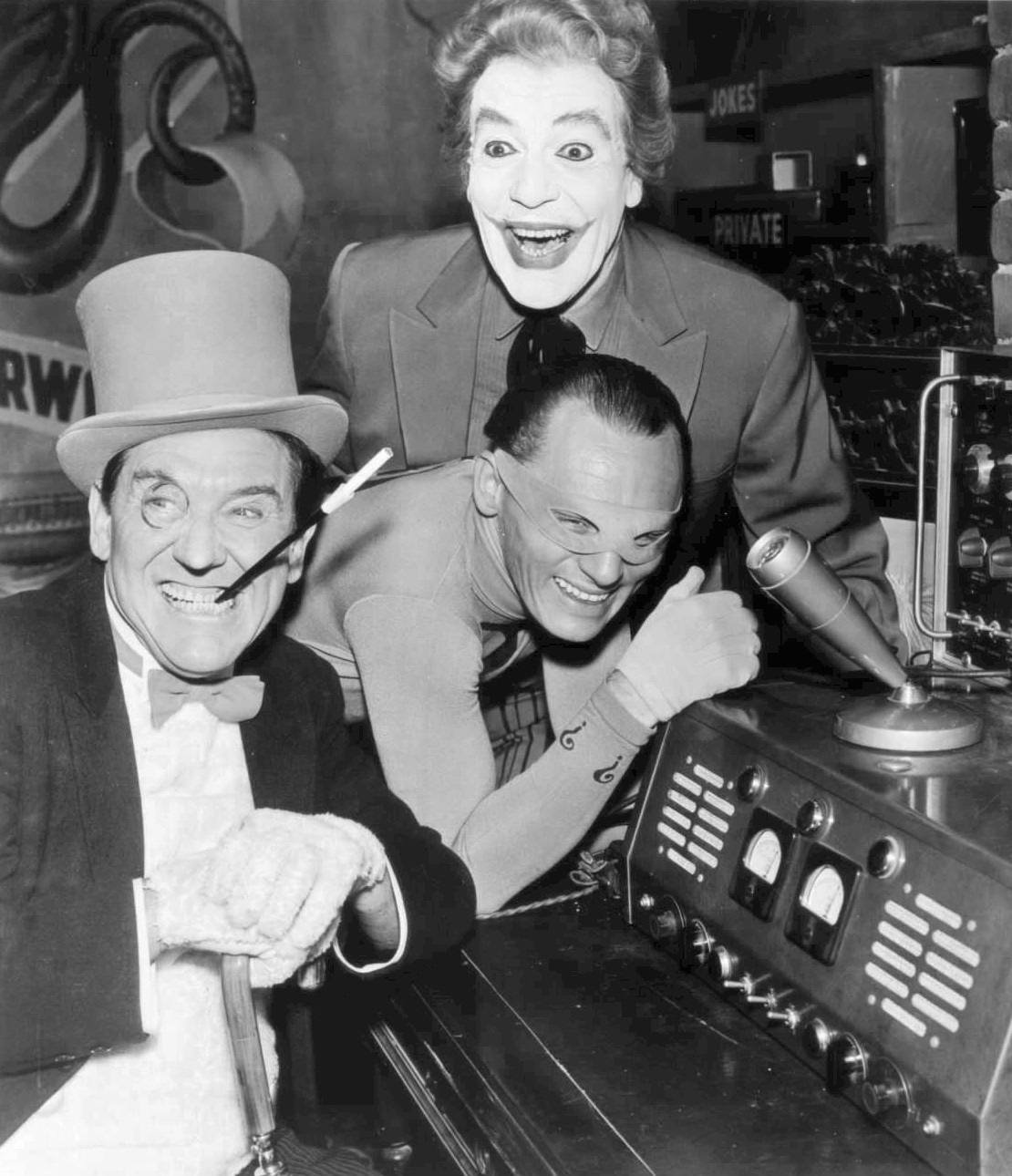
Frequent "special guest villains" (clockwise from left) Burgess Meredith as the Penguin, Cesar Romero as the Joker, and Frank Gorshin as the Riddler.

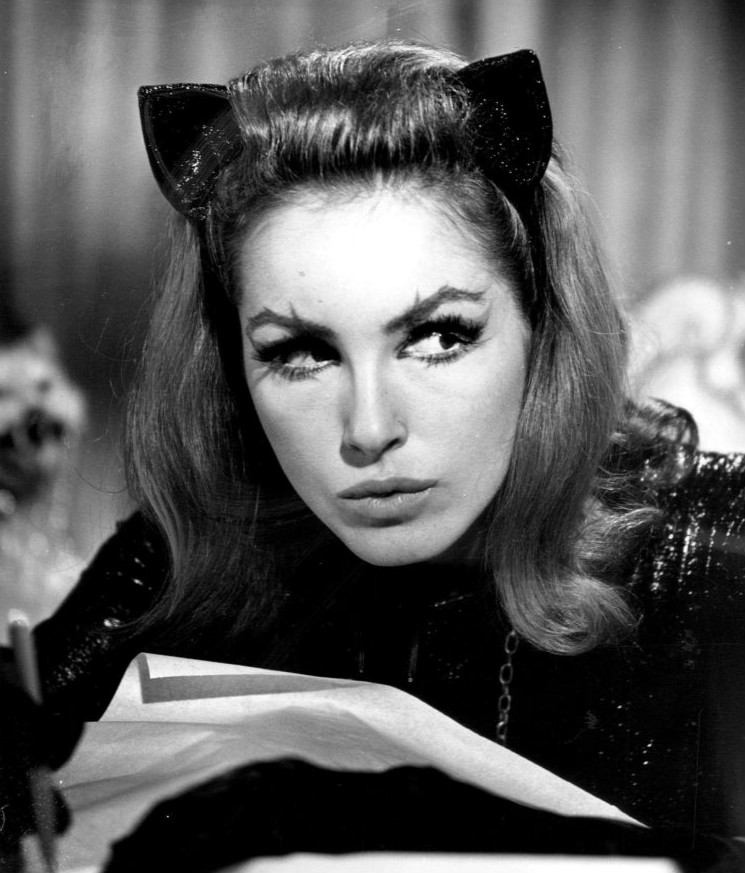
Julie Newmar as Catwoman in the first and second seasons (1966–1967) of the show.

Lorenzo Semple Jr. had signed on as head scriptwriter. He wrote the pilot script and generally wrote in a pop-art adventure style. Stanley Ralph Ross, Stanford Sherman, and Charles Hoffman were script writers who generally leaned more toward campy comedy, and in Ross's case, sometimes outright slapstick and satire. It was initially intended as a one-hour show, but as ABC executives changed the premiere date from fall 1966 to January and the network having only two early-evening half-hour time slots available, the show was split into two parts to air in 30-minute installments on Wednesdays and Thursdays. A cliffhanger connected the two episodes, echoing the old movie serials.

Some ABC affiliates were unhappy that ABC included a fourth commercial minute in every episode of Batman. One affiliate refused to air the series. The network insisted it needed the extra advertising revenue.

The Joker, the Penguin, the Riddler, Catwoman, Mr. Freeze, and the Mad Hatter, villains who originated in the comic books, all appeared in the series, the plots of which were deliberately villain-driven. According to the producers, Frank Gorshin was selected to portray Riddler because he had been a Batman fan since childhood. Catwoman was portrayed by three actresses during the series run: by Julie Newmar in the first two seasons, by Lee Meriwether in the feature film based on the series, and by Eartha Kitt in the third and final season.

Burgess Meredith improvised the Penguin's "quacking" to avoid coughing out loud from smoke getting caught in his throat from the cigarette required for the role.

The show was extraordinarily popular, and was considered "the biggest TV phenomenon of the mid-1960s".

=== Season 2 ===
Semple's participation in the series decreased in the second season. In his autobiography Back to the Batcave, Adam West explained to Jeff Rovin – to whom he dictated the autobiography after rejecting an offer to contribute to The Official "Batman" Batbook written by Joel Eisner – that when work on the second season commenced following the completion of the feature film, Dozier, his immediate deputy Howie Horwitz, and the rest of the cast and crew rushed their preparation. Thus, they failed to give themselves enough time to determine what they wanted to do with the series during season two.

John Astin replaced Frank Gorshin as The Riddler for a pair of episodes when Gorshin's new agents at William Morris demanded more money.

=== Season 3 ===
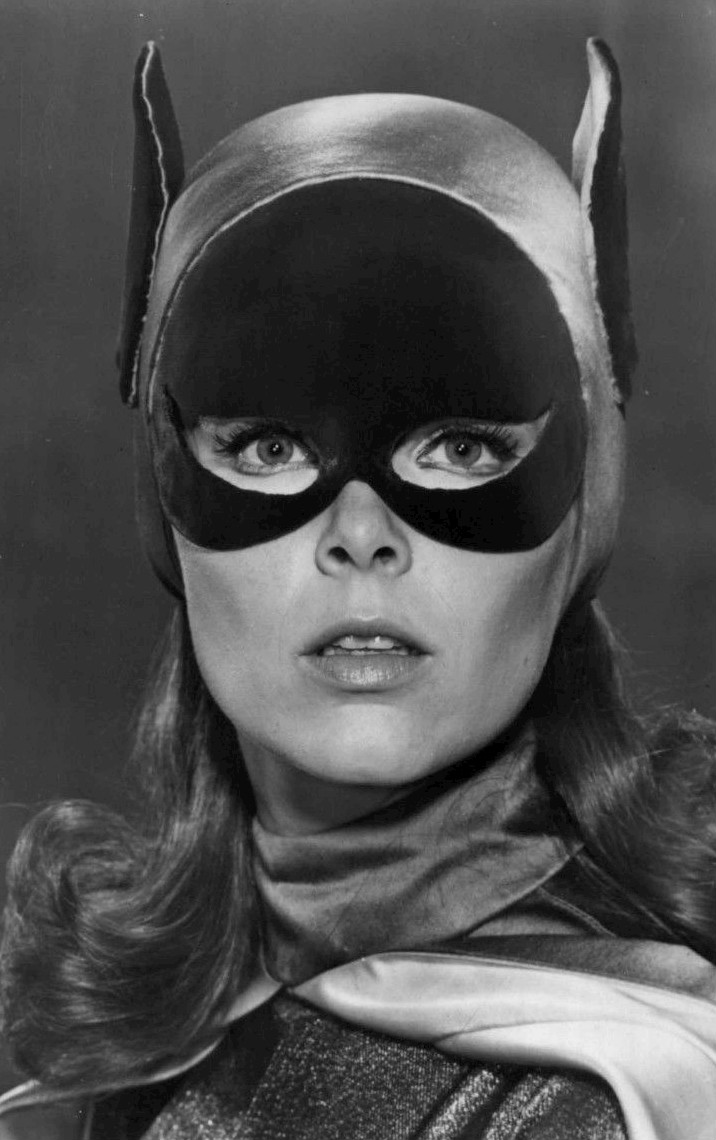
Yvonne Craig was added to the cast for season three in 1967, portraying Barbara Gordon/Batgirl.

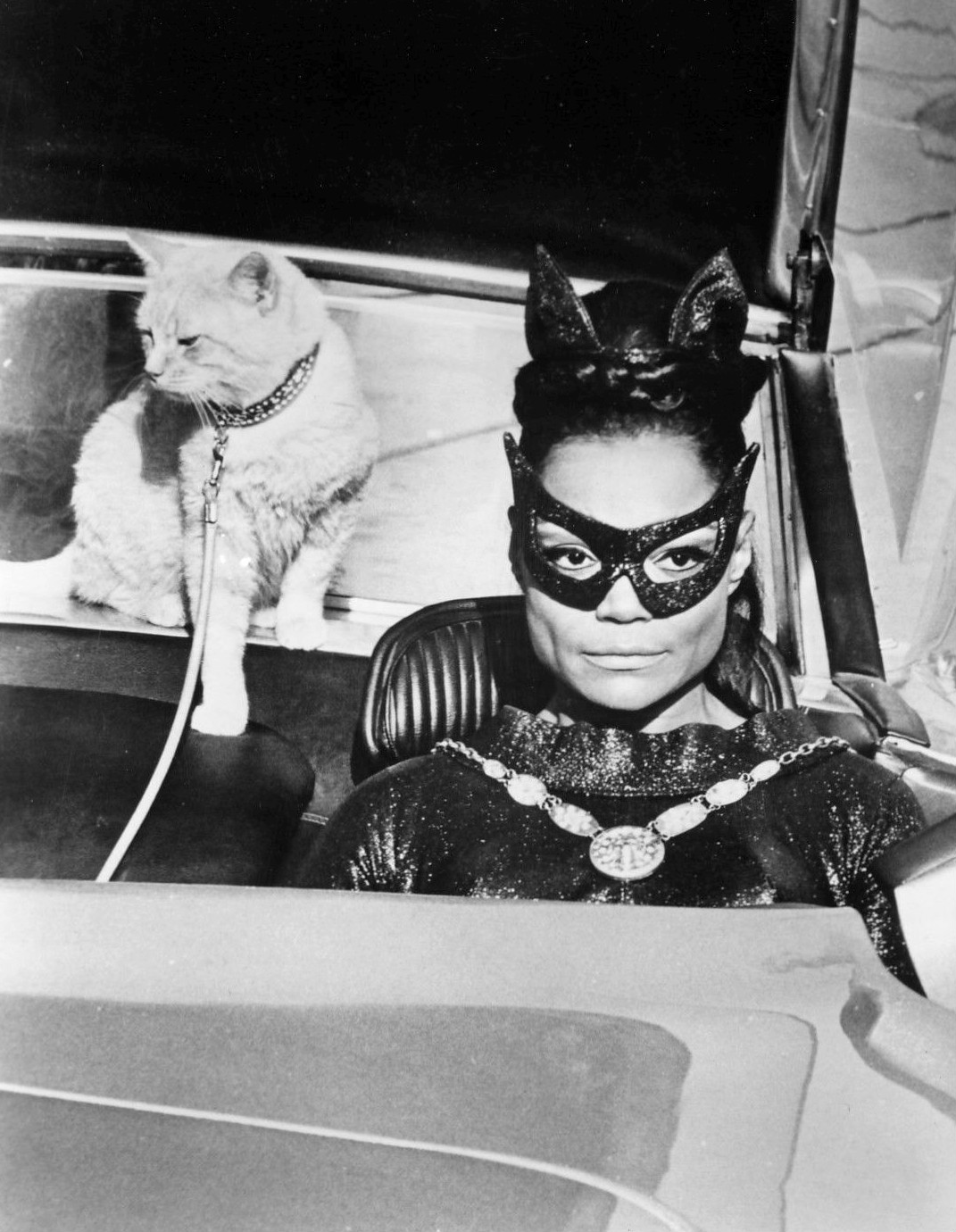
Eartha Kitt as Catwoman in the third and final season.

By season three, ratings were falling, and the series' future seemed uncertain. To attract new viewers, Dozier opted to introduce a female character. He came up with the idea of using Batgirl, who in her civilian identity would be Commissioner Gordon's daughter, Barbara. He asked the editor of the Batman comics to further develop the character (who had made her debut in a 1966 issue of Detective Comics). To convince ABC executives to introduce Batgirl as a regular on the show, a promotional short featuring Yvonne Craig as Batgirl and Tim Herbert as Killer Moth was produced. Batgirl was the first superheroine to appear in an ongoing capacity on television. The show was reduced to once a week, with primarily self-contained episodes, although the following week's villain would be introduced in a tag at the end of each episode, similar to a soap opera. Accordingly, the narrator's cliffhanger phrases were mainly eliminated, and most episodes ended with him encouraging viewers to watch the following week. (Note: Adam West, dictating Back to the Batcave to Jeff Rovin, admitted to having resented the development; in his words: "We were now calculating and titillating. These kinds of things are always short-term solutions to problems".)

Aunt Harriet was reduced to just two cameo appearances during the third season due to Madge Blake's poor health and the issue of trying to fit so many characters (Batman, Robin, Batgirl, Alfred, Commissioner Gordon, Chief O'Hara, and a guest villain) into a half-hour episode. Another cast change during the final season was replacing Julie Newmar, a popular recurring guest villain as the Catwoman during the first two seasons. Singer-actress Eartha Kitt assumed the role for season three, as Newmar was working on the film Mackenna's Gold at that time and was therefore unable to appear. In the United States, Kitt's performance in the series marked the second mainstream television success of a black female, following Nichelle Nichols as Lt. Uhura in Star Trek and continued breaking the racial boundaries of the time. Frank Gorshin, the original actor to play the Riddler, returned after a one-season hiatus, during which John Astin made one appearance in the role.

The nature of the scripts and acting started to enter into the realm of surrealism. In addition, the third season was much more topical, with references to hippies, mods, and distinctive 1960s slang, which the previous two seasons had avoided. The set design also changed to a more minimalist setup, except for Wayne Manor, Commissioner Gordon's office and Barbara Gordon/Batgirl's Apartment, the majority of the season 3 sets consisted of stylized cardboard or paper cutouts set up against a black background.

=== Episode format ===
As head scriptwriter, Lorenzo Semple wrote four episodes himself and established a series of "Bat Rules" for the freelance writers working under him. The show's campiness was played up in elements, including the design of the villains, dialogue and in signs appearing on various props. Batman would frequently reveal one of his many crime-fighting gadgets, which were usually given a ridiculous-sounding name, such as Shark Repellent Bat-Spray or Extra-Strong Bat-Knockout Gas. The series used a narrator (executive producer William Dozier, uncredited) who would end the cliffhanger episodes by intoning, "Tune in tomorrow – same Bat-time, same Bat-channel!" During the climactic fistfights in each episode, the punches and other impacts were punctuated by onomatopoeia (sound effects such as "POW!", "BAM!", "ZONK!") superimposed on the screen, as in comic-book fight scenes (according to Adam West, this was partially a production decision that allowed the show to minimize on-screen violence by simply not depicting most of it in the first place).

A typical story begins with a villain's nefarious caper (stealing a fabulous treasure, kidnapping a prominent person, attempting to take over Gotham City, etc.). At police headquarters, Commissioner Gordon and Chief O'Hara deduce the villain's identity, admit they're outclassed, and gaze reverently at the Batphone. At "stately Wayne Manor", Alfred (Wayne's butler) answers the Batphone and calls Bruce Wayne and Dick Grayson away from an oblivious Aunt Harriet with a humorously transparent excuse. Batman and Robin race the Batmobile to police headquarters and begin to work on the case, usually insisting on doing it alone. Batman and Robin locate the villain, lose in a brawl, and are left alone in a ridiculously complex deathtrap. The episode ends in a cliffhanger. The next episode resolves the cliffhanger in a comically improbable fashion. The same general plot pattern of investigation and confrontation repeats until another major brawl (accented by onscreen onomatopoeic words) that defeats the villain. Scene transitions in the show were accompanied by a Batman logo appearing over a rapidly-spinning background along with an iconic stinger. Episodes also frequently featured "Window Cameos", in which Batman and Robin are shown climbing up the side of a building by rope, and a guest celebrity appears out of a nearby window of the building and makes a joke or aside.

=== Cancellation ===
Near the end of the third season, ratings had dropped significantly, and ABC canceled the show. NBC agreed to take over the series, but before it could do so, it was discovered that hundreds of thousands of dollars' worth of Batman sets had been destroyed. Rather than rebuild the sets, NBC dropped the project.

=== Camera shots ===
From the beginning, cameras were purposely placed out of level with the set (known as "Dutch tilt"), and characters were filmed from high and low angles. This technique was most often used when filming on the set of a villain's lair to lend a surreal, comic-book quality to the scenes, as well as to imply or merely remind the viewer that the crooks were crooked.

=== Batmobile ===
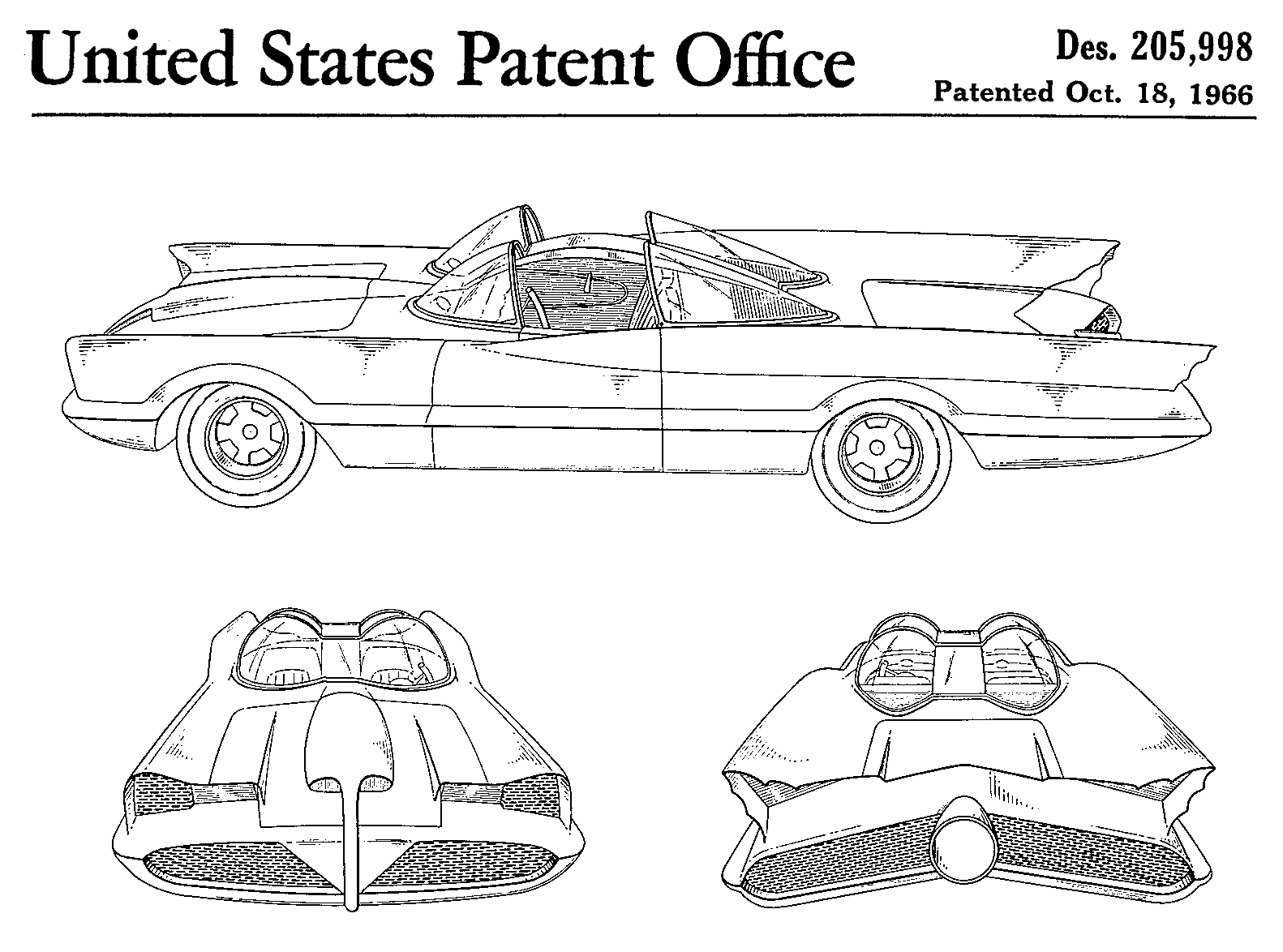
The 1966 television Batmobile, built by George Barris from a Lincoln Futura concept car.

The original Batmobile from the 1960s TV series was auctioned in January 2013, at the Barrett-Jackson auction house in Scottsdale, Arizona. It was sold for $4.2 million.

=== Tie-in music ===
Several cast members recorded music tied into the series. Adam West released a single titled "Miranda", a country-tinged pop song that he actually performed in costume during live appearances in the 1960s. Frank Gorshin released a song titled "The Riddler", which was composed and arranged by Mel Tormé. Burgess Meredith recorded a spoken-word single called "The Escape" backed with "The Capture", which consisted of the Penguin narrating his recent crime spree to a jazz beat. Burt Ward recorded a song called "Boy Wonder, I Love You", written and arranged by Frank Zappa.

In 1966, Batman: The Exclusive Original Soundtrack Album was released on LP, featuring music by Nelson Riddle and snippets of dialogue from Adam West, Burt Ward, Burgess Meredith, Frank Gorshin, Anne Baxter (as Zelda the Great) and George Sanders (the first Mr. Freeze). The "Batman Theme" was included, along with titles like "Batusi A Go! Go!", "Batman Thaws Mr. Freeze", and "Batman Blues". It was reissued later on compact disc. Neal Hefti, who wrote the iconic theme song for the series, also released a soundtrack album in 1966, Batman Theme and 11 Hefti Bat Songs.

== Release ==
=== Home media ===
DVD/Blu-ray name	Region 1	Region 2	Region 4
The Complete First Season (DVD)	November 11, 2014	TBA	TBA
The Second Season: Part One (DVD)	February 10, 2015	TBA	TBA
The Second Season: Part Two (DVD)	July 14, 2015	TBA	TBA
The Complete Third Season (DVD)	November 3, 2015	TBA	TBA
The Complete Series (DVD & Blu-ray)	November 11, 2014	February 16, 2015	TBA

In January 2014, television host Conan O'Brien posted on his Twitter account, and Warner Bros. later confirmed that Warner Bros. would release an official DVD and Blu-ray boxed set of the complete series sometime the same year. In April, the website tvshowsondvd.com quoted Burt Ward in saying that Warner Bros. would release the complete series on November 11, 2014, in time for the holiday season under license from 20th Century Fox Home Entertainment and that Adam West and he were doing special features for the release.

Prior to the announcement, multiple conflicting reports were given for the reason the series had not been released officially. These included:

- Negotiations between DC Comics (and parent company Warner Bros.), owners of the Batman character, and 20th Century Fox Television. (Note: From Lambert, David (December 5, 2005). "Batman – 1966 Batman Series Still Not Coming To DVD Yet". Archived from the original on April 16, 2008.: Fox (which owns the footage) and DC Comics (owner of the characters and sister company of Warner Bros.) were in the process of sorting out the legalities and licensing situations for this release. Other license issues were potentially involved, as well, such as music.)
- Greenway/ABC/Fox rights issues: The Batman series was conceived as an equal partnership between William Dozier's Greenway Productions and Fox in 1964 before Fox entered into a separate agreement with ABC to produce the series in 1965. With three companies involved almost from the outset, some speculation indicated these rights were tangled even before the DC Comics character ownership rights were to be considered. In 2006, Deborah Dozier Potter, "the successor-in-interest to Greenway Productions" sued Fox for allegedly withholding monies under the Fox/ABC agreement. Dozier Potter further claimed that this came to her attention when, in March 2005, "she considered releasing the series on DVD", implying that (from her perspective at least) Greenway/Dozier Potter had some say in the matter of potential DVD release of the series. The case was resolved/dismissed in November 2007. In February 2005, John Stacks approached Deborah Dozier Potter to market the series on DVD. There were many offers and lots of interest in the release of the series, as can be read in Joel Eisner's The Official Batbook Revised Bat Edition 2008. (Note: The relevant passage reads: "The lawsuit filed by Debra Dozier Potter was dismissed with prejudice on 11/26/07. Furthermore, the plaintiff filed a notice of unconditional settlement on 11/19/07. The case is DEBORAH DOZIER POTTER VS TWENTIETH CENTURY FOX FILM CORPORATION Case No BC357067".) Soon after, Classic Media reportedly bought out the Dozier estate's interest in the series, which they then sold to Fox in the early years of the 2010s.
- Other complications/rights issues:
  - Christopher D. Heer, writing at the "1966 Batman Message Board", clarified a quote by moderator Lee Kirkham, noting that there may have been the need for complicated deals regarding the numerous cameos, since "...at least some of the cameos were done as uncredited, unpaid walk-ons – which means that Fox does NOT have home video clearances for them. Either those scenes would have to be cut or an agreement reached with the actors".
  - Kirkham's initial quote also noted that, alongside music clearance issues, there could also have been problems over some of the costumes and the original Batmobile:

"It may surprise you, but then there are also rights issues concerning the design of the unique Batmobile design used in the show, and possibly a separate issue regarding some of the costumes as well!"

Under the Fox/ABC deal, the series is still in syndication and regularly shown on several channels worldwide, currently appearing in the United States on Me-TV and IFC as of July 2014. Until 2014, only the 1966 feature film was available on DVD from 20th Century Fox Home Entertainment for non-broadcast viewing in North America. This affected the 2003 television movie reunion Return to the Batcave: The Misadventures of Adam and Burt, also released to DVD, which could only use footage from the 1966 movie.

With Batman being unavailable for home video release until 2014, an unusual situation occurred in which material considered to be DVD featurettes was released separately. In 2004, Image Entertainment released Holy Batmania, a two-DVD set that included documentaries on the making of the series, as well as rare footage such as the original screen tests of the cast and Lyle Waggoner. In 2008, Adam West released a privately issued DVD with the tongue-in-cheek title Adam West Naked for which he recorded anecdotes regarding all 120 episodes of the series. In 2013, PBS aired an episode of Pioneers of Television called "Superheroes" that featured interviews with Adam West and Burt Ward, and talked about the 1960s TV series. It was released on DVD on March 11 of the same year.

Also in 2013, PBS produced and transmitted a documentary titled Superheroes: A Never-Ending Battle. This documentary talked a little bit about the series and included an interview with Adam West.

Warner Bros. released the full 120-episode Batman collection on Blu-ray and DVD on November 11, 2014 (under license from 20th Century Fox) with a variety of extras including a miniature Batmobile, a 32-page episode guide, and a 32-page hardcover book titled The Adam West Scrapbook. A second box set released on Warner Bros.' own "batmanondvd" website replaces the Batmobile, The Adam West Scrapbook, and the trading cards with a letter from Adam West, a script from the episode "The Joker is Wild" and a bonus box containing the film on DVD and the "Adam West Naked" documentary. This series is also available at the Google Play Store, and iTunes Store.

== Reception ==
On review aggregator site Rotten Tomatoes, the series overall has an approval rating of 72%. The first season rated 50%, based on 22 reviews. The third season rated 94%, based on 16 reviews. The website's summary reads: "Fierce females shook up the dynamic duo in the final season of Batman with plenty of technicolor "POW!""

Television critics Alan Sepinwall and Matt Zoller Seitz ranked Batman the 82nd-greatest American television show of all time in their 2016 book TV (The Book), stating that "West's performance, the brilliance of which has required decades to be properly recognized, played as if series creator William Dozier and chief developer Lorenzo Semple Jr., had taken the establishment's fantasy of itself and dolled it up in tights and a cape. The anarchic gangs of supervillains and henchmen that kept trying to capture or destroy Gotham City stood in for the forces of chaos that kept threatening to engulf so-called civilized America throughout the sixties, only made colorfully grotesque and knowingly silly". In 1997, TV Guide ranked the episodes "The Purr-fect Crime" and "Better Luck Next Time" #86 on its list of the 100 Greatest Episodes. In 2009, "Better Luck Next Time" was ranked No. 72.

Conan O'Brien said the show was among his favorites and formative in his comedy development, influencing deadpan comedies Airplane! and The Naked Gun.

== Reunions and role reprisals ==
- In 1973, Yvonne Craig and Burt Ward would reprise their roles as Batgirl and Robin in a televised public service announcement U.S. Department of Labor Wage and Hour Division which sought to educate the general public about the Equal Pay Act of 1963.
- In 1977, Adam West and Burt Ward returned as voice actors for the second Filmation-produced animated series, The New Adventures of Batman.
- In 1979, West, Ward, and Frank Gorshin reunited and reprised their respective roles on NBC for Hanna-Barbera's two Legends of the Superheroes television specials.
- In the 1980s, several cast members teamed up for a series of celebrity editions of Family Feud. The participants were West, Ward, Yvonne Craig, Lee Meriwether, and Vincent Price.
- In 1984, West would once again reprise his role as Batman in animated form when he succeeded Olan Soule in the final two seasons of Super Friends.
- November 1985 would see several cast members reunited on the syndicated afternoon talk show America, as West, Ward, Julie Newmar, Vincent Price, Cesar Romero, Terry Moore, Liberace, Eartha Kitt and Zsa Zsa Gabor (Yvonne Craig does not appear) were reunited along with the original Batmobile which was still covered with flocking from its tours since the 1970s. In the opening scene, West and Ward are in the Batmobile from an actual TV episode. They are segued from the TV film episode to the live stage again inside the Batmobile. Ricardo Montalbán introduces them. Ward requests that he would like to have a 15th-anniversary reunion of the Batman Class of 1968.
- On April 28, 1988, The Late Show, hosted by Ross Shafer, had a Batman reunion show with the following cast members. Adam West, Burt Ward, Julie Newmar, Eartha Kitt, Frank Gorshin, Yvonne Craig, a pre-recorded video appearance by Cesar Romero, and the last television appearance of Alan Napier, who plays Alfred Pennyworth. Batmobile creator George Barris also appeared with the stunt version of the Batmobile. Eartha Kitt performed her song "I Want to Be Evil".
- In 1997, West returned to the role of Batman for the first time in 12 years, voicing the Caped Crusader/Spruce Wayne in the animated short Boo Wonder. It was the fourth segment of episode 93 (season 5) of Animaniacs produced by Warner Bros. It was a parody of the 1966 Batman TV series with Animaniacs character Chicken Boo replacing Robin the Boy Wonder.
- In 2002, West and Ward did their voice-over and reprised their roles as Batman and Robin in an episode of The Simpsons, "Large Marge". Bart Simpson with his friend, Milhouse Van Houten, watched an old Batman episode as the dynamic duo were trapped on a carousel by Krusty the Clown as ClownFace. Batman and Robin made their escapes, thanks to their Bat Carousel Reversal Spray. The police arrested ClownFace and his henchmen. West had previously voiced himself in the 1990s "Mr. Plow" episode, in which he is briefly shown driving the Batmobile.
- In 2003, West and Ward reunited for a tongue-in-cheek television movie titled Return to the Batcave: The Misadventures of Adam and Burt which combined dramatized recreations of the filming of the original series (with younger actors standing in for the stars), with modern footage of West and Ward searching for a stolen Batmobile. The film included cameo appearances by Newmar, Gorshin, and Lee Meriwether, as well as Lyle Waggoner, who had been an early candidate for the role of Batman. Yvonne Craig did not appear in the film as she reportedly disliked the script. The film was released on DVD in May 2005.
- In 2005, West again returned to the role of Batman/Bruce Wayne for the Digital Animation & Visual Effects (DAVE) School released Batman: New Times, a short CGI film in which all characters were portrayed as Minimates (predating the Lego film craze). In addition to West, other notable voice actors included Mark Hamill as The Joker, Courtney Thorne-Smith as Catwoman, and Dick Van Dyke as Commissioner Gordon.
- Ward reprised his role as an older Dick Grayson in the 2019 Arrowverse crossover "Crisis on Infinite Earths".

== Spin-offs and sequels ==
=== Batman (1966 film) ===
A film based on the television show, Batman, was released in 1966. The film was initially intended to be produced before the series as a way to introduce it to the public, but the series premiere was moved up, and the film was forced to wait until the summer hiatus after the first season. The film was produced quickly to get into theatres prior to the start of season two of the television series.

Originally, the film had been conceived to help sell the television series abroad, but the success of the series in the United States was sufficient publicity. The film's budget allowed for producers to build the Batboat and lease a helicopter that would be made into the Batcopter, both of which were used in the second and third seasons of the television show. The film did not initially perform well in theaters.

=== Batgirl ===
In addition to the film, and prior to season 3, a 7-minute pilot introducing Batgirl was produced. While it never actually aired, it was intended as a pilot for a Batgirl spin-off series that would often cross over with the parent series. These actions were to boost declining ratings and to get a wider audience by having a regular female lead. Eventually the end result was simply adding Batgirl as one of the leads on the main series and she appeared in every episode of the 3rd season with the season's opening episode focusing almost entirely on her. This helped the season's ratings temporarily increase, but not enough for ABC to continue to produce new episodes. The pilot was eventually released on DVD and Blu-ray in the Batman Complete Series box set.

=== Legends of the Superheroes ===
Two TV specials were produced by Hanna-Barbera featuring Adam West and Burt Ward reprising their roles as Batman and Robin alongside several other DC Comics heroes and villains. Frank Gorshin also returned as The Riddler for the first special, The Challenge of the Superheroes.

=== Batman: Return of the Caped Crusaders ===
An animated film marking the show's 50th anniversary, with West and Ward reprising their roles as Batman and Robin. Julie Newmar also returned as Catwoman.

Batman: Return of the Caped Crusaders was released on Digital HD and Digital Media on October 11, 2016, and on DVD and Blu-ray November 1.

=== Batman vs. Two-Face ===
A sequel to Batman: Return of the Caped Crusaders called Batman vs. Two-Face was released on October 10, 2017. The film starred William Shatner voicing Two-Face as the main antagonist. Adam West died before it was released, but did complete his voiceover work before his death. This was one of Adam West's final performances before he died from leukemia.

=== Batman '66 ===
In 2013, DC began publication of Batman '66, a comic book series telling all-new stories set in the world of the 1966–68 TV series. Jeff Parker writes the series, which features cover art by Mike Allred and interior art by different artists in each issue. In the course of this series, the Bookworm, the Minstrel, Sandman, Olga Queen of the Cossacks, Zelda The Great, Shame, and Marsha Queen of Diamonds all have their first appearance in Batman comics. Penguin, Joker, Riddler, Catwoman, and Mr. Freeze also appear in the series. Issue #3 of Batman '66 introduced the Red Hood and Dr. Holly Quinn into the series continuity. In issue #7, Batman used a new vehicle, the Bat-Jet, to follow False-Face to Mount Rushmore. The series was to have introduced Killer Croc into the continuity, as well as a new villainess named Cleopatra. Issues #23 through #28 were mainly dedicated to introducing villains from the comics that either were not used, such as Solomon Grundy, Poison Ivy, and Scarecrow, or did not exist at the time, such as Ra's al Ghul, Bane, the Harlequin (Dr. Quinn's criminal persona) and Killer Croc (who was introduced earlier as one of King Tut's henchmen but gained a focus story). The first five issues were compiled into the Batman '66 Vol. 1 trade paperback in April 2014. Kevin Smith and Ralph Garman likewise worked on a Batman and Green Hornet crossover titled Batman '66 meets The Green Hornet. The six-issue miniseries began publication in June 2014. Jeff Parker wrote a Batman and The Man from U.N.C.L.E. team-up titled Batman '66 meets The Man from U.N.C.L.E. released in 2016. Ian Edginton wrote a Batman team-up with John Steed and Emma Peel of The Avengers titled Batman '66 Meets Steed and Mrs. Peel. Batman teams up with Wonder Woman in the crossover team up Batman' 66 Meets Wonder Woman '77, written by both Parker and Marc Andreyko. In a reversal of sorts, Archie Comics produced the next crossover titled, Archie Meets Batman '66, released as a six issue mini series in July 2018. The series was written by Batman '66 veteran Jeff Parker and Archies stalwart Michael Moreci. Mike Allred returned to create the main covers, with Archie artists creating the alternative covers and interior art.

==== Other comics ====
A version of Batman closely resembling his 1960s TV series counterpart briefly appears in the 2003 Planetary/Batman one-shot by DC Comics.

The 7th issue of Solo featured a short adventure titled Batman A-Go-Go!, which was created by writer/artist Mike Allred as a tribute to the 1960s TV series.

Bluewater Comics has released a series of comics that take their cue from the TV show. They are The Mis-Adventures of Adam West, The Secret Lives of Julie Newmar, and Burt Ward, Boy Wonder and are similar in tone to the TV series. The Mis-Adventures of Adam West is a four-issue miniseries and a regular series that ran nine issues. The Secret Lives of Julie Newmar is a four-issue miniseries, and Burt Ward, Boy Wonder was going to be a four-issue miniseries but has not yet been published in full (although a promotional first issue was released for Free Comic Book Day).

== Crossovers ==
=== The Green Hornet ===
Van Williams and Bruce Lee made a cameo appearance as the Green Hornet and Kato in "window cameos" while Batman and Robin were climbing a building. This was in part one of a two-part second-season episode of the Batman TV series, "The Spell of Tut", which aired on September 28, 1966.

Later that same season, the Green Hornet and Kato appeared in the two-part second-season episodes A Piece of the Action and Batman's Satisfaction, aired on March 1–2, 1967. In the two episodes, the Green Hornet and Kato are in Gotham City to bust a counterfeit stamp ring run by Colonel Gumm (portrayed by Roger C. Carmel). The Batman's Satisfaction episode leads to a mixed fight, with both Batman & Robin and the Green Hornet & Kato fighting Colonel Gumm and his gang. Once Gumm's crew was defeated, Batman and Robin squared off against the Green Hornet and Kato, resulting in a stand-off that was interrupted by the police. In this episode, Batman, Robin, and the police consider the Green Hornet and Kato to be criminals. Batman and Robin, however, were cordial to the duo in the earlier window appearance. There is also a mention of The Green Hornet TV series in the Batman TV series episode The Impractical Joker (episode 55, Part 1, aired November 16, 1966): while watching TV together, Alfred, Dick Grayson and Bruce Wayne (who says, "It's time to watch The Green Hornet ", with the hornet buzzing sound audible in the background) are interrupted by the Joker; then, after the interruption, The Green Hornet TV series theme music is heard.

In the December 9, 1966 Green Hornet episode "The Secret of the Sally Bell", the Batmobile can be seen revolving on its turntable floor in the Batcave on a "bad guy's" TV set. In the February 3, 1967 Green Hornet episode "Ace in the Hole" (which aired between the September 1966 and March 1967 Batman appearances mentioned above), Batman and Robin can be seen climbing a building on a television set. There was one other Green Hornet & Kato appearance that was not on the Batman TV series nor on The Green Hornet TV series: a segment of the Milton Berle Show/The Hollywood Palace aired in the Fall of 1966 brought together The Green Hornet and Kato (Van Williams and Bruce Lee), and Batman (Adam West), in a comedy sketch with Milton Berle, in which Bruce Lee demonstrates his martial arts expertise. Burt Ward as "Robin" was not included in this appearance.

=== Arrowverse ===
The Arrowverse crossover event "Crisis on Infinite Earths" features a cameo appearance from Burt Ward as an older Dick Grayson/Robin, wearing a red sweater with a yellow-and-green trim while walking a dog. Upon seeing the skies turn red, the former Boy Wonder shouts, "Holy crimson skies of death!" The event also reveals that the events of this series are set on Earth-66, which is one of the worlds destroyed by the Anti-Monitor (LaMonica Garrett) during the Crisis.

=== DC Extended Universe ===
After the first screening of the DC Extended Universe (DCEU) film The Flash (2023) to the attendees of the Cinemacon 2023, director Andy Muschietti and producer Barbara Muschietti revealed that cameo appearances of Romero's Joker and Meredith's Penguin were considered for the film, but were left on the "cutting floor room" due to not fitting in the story. The film also features CGI cameos of West as Batman and Ward as Robin during the film's final battle.

=== Batman vs. Godzilla ===
The original idea for this seemingly mismatched crossover between Batman and Godzilla comes from the hand of series writer Shinichi Sekizawa, who submitted a manuscript of the proposal in November 1965. Sekizawa's concept featured several characters from the Batman universe, including Robin and Commissioner James Gordon. To battle Godzilla, Batman and his sidekicks would have utilized several vehicles to engage in combat, including the Batmobile, the Batcopter, and the Batcycle. The concept also featured the introduction of a weather control apparatus, an idea which would later be used for Son of Godzilla (1967). It was also going to have another device to control Godzilla himself, which would possibly indicate another antagonist pitting the two characters against each other. In terms of Sekizawa's motivation, his reasoning seems clear in these drafts: to try and repeat the mammoth international success that the crossover film King Kong vs. Godzilla (1962) enjoyed. This is made apparent in allusions to the earlier 1962 film, as even this extremely early take at the concept included mention of Godzilla's battle with King Kong, which was noted as being included with stock footage of the two titans fighting. The concept never got far enough for a full-fledged script to have been created. There are many questions related to the proposal still unknown, such as whether DC Comics was ever actually approached with the idea or not. It is also not known to what degree the then-recent Batman TV series, which debuted two months after Sekizawa proposed this idea, might have played, if any. Also, references to "Batgirl" are made in the concept, which would predate the Barbara Gordon version of the character that would later become synonymous with the name in 1966.

== In other media ==
=== Commercials ===
- Lava Soap Grime Fighters – in this 1966 commercial, Batman and Robin had just wrapped up the latest crime when Commissioner Gordon notices Chief O'Hara's dirty hands and asks Batman to pass the chief a bar of Lava Soap.
- Rally Car Wax – Batman and Robin demonstrate this DuPont product on the Batmobile before pursuing the Joker in a 1974 commercial.
- Fact Toothpaste – Alan Napier stars as the faithful Alfred Pennyworth as he explains how to get Batman and Robin posters through Fact Toothpaste.

=== Public service announcements ===
The Batman character appeared in four public service announcements:

- U.S. Savings Bonds – in 1966, West, as Batman, encouraged schoolchildren to heed then-President Lyndon B. Johnson's call for them to buy U.S. savings stamps, a children's version of U.S. Savings Bonds, to support the Vietnam War.
- British road safety – in 1967, a one-minute public information film (PIF) was created for the Central Office of Information in the United Kingdom. The PIF was filmed in Kennington, London and showed Batman, played by Adam West, taking a break from fighting crime to help children with their techniques of road safety.
- Safety caution – in 1966, due to multiple instances of UK children jumping from elevated locations attempting to emulate Batman, Adam West and Burt Ward recorded a short PIF to be shown prior to the airing of all episodes of Batman in the UK to explain to children that Batman could not fly. Ward exclaimed in one line, "Holy broken bones!" during this filming.
- U.S. Department of Labor – in a 1973 PSA for the U.S. Department of Labor Wage & Hour Division narrated by William Dozier, Batman and Robin were tied to a post amid the threat of a ticking time bomb, but Batgirl (Yvonne Craig) refused to release them because she was paid less than Robin (Burt Ward), in violation of the Federal Equal Pay Law. Dick Gautier played Batman this time, because West was, at the time, trying to distance himself from the role.

=== Batman Live! ===
During the summer/fall of 1966, Adam West and Frank Gorshin went on a tour as Batman and the Riddler to promote the new Batman movie and the series. They were usually accompanied by several bands before the featured event that saw Batman and the Riddler exchange corny jokes as well as a song performed by West. The tour most famously stopped at Shea Stadium in New York on June 25 and City Park in New Orleans on November 26.

=== Film appearances ===
- The 1960s TV series versions of Batman, Robin, Joker, Catwoman, and Penguin appear in Space Jam: A New Legacy. They are among the Warner Bros. Serververse inhabitants that watch the basketball game between the Tune Squad and the Goon Squad. The show's theme song can also be heard during runaway train scene in the first DC World sequence.

=== Music ===
- Batman: Exclusive Original Television Soundtrack Album is the official series soundtrack featuring the music of series composer Neal Hefti, the orchestra conducted by Nelson Riddle, in addition to the voices of Adam West, Burt Ward and several guest villains from the first season. It was released in 1966 through 20th Century Fox Records.
- Miranda, recorded by Adam West at the height of the series' popularity, is an upbeat pop song about Batman falling in love but begging not to be asked to remove his mask. The B side featured West singing the non-Batman related song You Only See Her. The album was released in 1966 through 20th Century Fox Records.
- The Capture and The Escape are a pair of jazzy singles recorded by Burgess Meredith. Both songs essentially tell one story, with side A explaining how Batman foiled the Penguin's latest plot and side B telling of the jailbreak. The songs were released in 1966 through ABC Records.
- The Riddler is a pop song written by Mel Torme and recorded by Frank Gorshin where Batman arch-villain The Riddler sings about himself while asking Riddles. The B side features the non-Batman related single by Gorshin, Never Let Her Go. The song was released in June 1966 through A&M Records.
- Boy Wonder I Love You is a pop song written by Frank Zappa and recorded by Burt Ward where Robin reads fan mail from his adoring fans. The B side features Ward singing Orange Colored Sky, which Batman co-star Adam West had previously performed on the variety television show, Hollywood Palace. The song was released in 1966 through MGM Records.
- Batman and Robin and The Story of Batman are a pair of talk tunes recorded by Adam West to promote his 1976 appearances in the UK during the 10th anniversary of the TV series. Side A features Batman and Robin using pepper to defeat "The Tickler". Side B features Batman telling fans how the record can be converted into a disguise by looking through the center hole of the disc as if it was some kind of mask. These recordings marked Adam West's return to the role of Batman (aside from public appearances) for the first time since the series ended. They were released through Target Records.

=== Pinball machine ===
The company Stern released the pinball machine Batman '66, based on the TV series, in December 2016. It is the first Stern game that features a full-color LCD in the backbox instead of a Dot-matrix display. There are three different versions of the pinball machine: Super Limited Edition, Limited Edition and Premium.

=== Collectibles ===
Starting in 1966, an enormous array of Batman merchandise was manufactured and marketed to cash in on the TV show's vast popularity. This includes trading cards, bubblegum cards, scale model kits of the Batmobile and Batboat, coloring books, and board games. Items from this era have gained substantial collector appeal with their variety, scarcity, and style.

One of the most desired collectibles involves the episodes introducing Catwoman ("The Purr-fect Crime"/"Better Luck Next Time"), which were the subject of a View-Master reel & booklet set in 1966 (Sawyers Packet # B492). While the series was first run on ABC, packet cover indicia reflected the "Bat Craze" cultural phenomenon by referring to the booklet as a Batbooklet, Dynamically Illustrated. By the time the television series was canceled in 1968, and GAF had taken over the View-Master product, Batbooklet was removed in favor of then-standard View-Master packaging for all future releases in the decades to follow, right up to the period when the standard packet line was discontinued. The first season's superimposed fight onomatopoeias were not used for the View-Master's scenes of fights. Instead, black-lined "blast" balloons (transparent inside) and series-like onomatopoeias were illustrated and superimposed over fight images.

The TV series' popularity has continued several decades after its debut; toy company Mattel has made the 1966 Batmobile in various scales for the Hot Wheels product line. The Batmobile with Batboat was also produced under the Matchbox and Corgi names in the UK during this period.

Warner Bros. acquired merchandising rights to the series in 2012. In 2013, Mattel released an action figure line based on the television series. To date, only a single series of figures have been produced: Batman, the Joker, the Penguin, the Riddler, Catwoman, and, exclusive to a boxset, Robin. Three Batman variants were also produced: a limited SDCC exclusive boxed figure with an action feature that replicates the famous Batusi dance, a carded Surf's Up Batman figure complete with surfboard and trunks, and a boxed, unmasked Batman with Batcomputer and Bruce Wayne's study accessories. A carded Joker variant, with surfboard and trunks, and a boxed Batgirl figure followed. Each figure has the likeness of their respective actor (with Catwoman resembling Newmar and the Riddler resembling Gorshin) and came packaged with a display base and collector card. A Batmobile was also sold to retail, making this the first time the classic model had been produced for action figures on a 6-inch scale.

In 2013, Hong Kong-based entertainment collectible manufacturer Hot Toys produced 1/6 scale versions of West's Batman and Ward's Robin. An extensive range of 8-inch action figures with the TV cast's likenesses have been released by Figures Toy Company (FTC) from 2013 to 2018 and, in 2017, a single wave of 3.75-inch figures (including King Tut, Bookworm, and two Mr. Freezes) from Funko.

In 2016, to celebrate the 50th anniversary of the TV series, Lego released set 76052 Classic TV series Batcave, featuring minifigure versions of Batman, Robin, Bruce Wayne, Dick Grayson, and the four main villains from the film (Catwoman, The Penguin, The Riddler, and Joker). In 2021, LEGO released a set based on the 1966 TV series Batmobile, featuring minifigure versions of Batman and Joker. This set was a newer version of an SDCC exclusive. Later that same year, LEGO released a buildable cowl based on the TV series.

== Legacy ==
The series stars, Adam West and Burt Ward, were typecast for decades afterward, with West especially finding himself unable to escape the reputation of a hammy, camp actor. Years after the series' impact faded, an episode of Batman: The Animated Series paid tribute to West with an episode titled "Beware the Gray Ghost". In this episode, West provided the voice of an aging star of a superhero television series Bruce Wayne had watched as a child, from which he later found inspiration. This gave West new popularity with the next generation of fans. He also played Gotham City's Mayor Grange in a somewhat recurring role in The Batman. In addition, West played the voice of Thomas Wayne, Bruce Wayne's father, in the episode "Chill of the Night!" from the series Batman: The Brave and the Bold. West would eventually embrace his past with the series. His recurring role as a fictionalized version of himself as Mayor West in the TV series Family Guy deliberately made no references to the series, at the behest of Family Guy creator Seth MacFarlane.

Burt Ward reprised his role as an older Dick Grayson in Crisis on Infinite Earths.

== See also ==
- 1960s in television
- Television in the United States
