= Smack in the Middle =

- Batman episode
- Episode no.: Season 1 Episode 2
- Directed by: Robert Butler
- Written by: Lorenzo Semple Jr.
- Production code: 6028-Pt. 2
- Original air date: January 13, 1966

Guest appearances
- Michael Fox; Jack Barry; Ben Astar; Damian O'Flynn; William Dozier; Jill St. John; Richard Reeves (uncredited); Special Guest Villain: Frank Gorshin as The Riddler

Episode chronology
← Previous "Hi Diddle Riddle"	Next → "Fine Feathered Finks"

"Smack in the Middle" is a first-season episode of Batman. It first aired on ABC TV Thursday January 13, 1966. It is the conclusion of the two-part series pilot, the first being titled "Hi Diddle Riddle", which aired on the previous Wednesday night January 12.

== Synopsis ==
Picking up from the previous night's episode in the Batcave, Batman's attempts to contact Robin are met with futility; alerted by Alfred Pennyworth about Aunt Harriet's having a fit on noticing their beds weren't slept in, Batman tells him to put her at ease by saying they're spending the night at his uncle's house. Meanwhile, the Riddler's "operation" on Robin involved only the making of a plastic surgery cast from Robin's masked face, used to make a perfect "Robin" disguise for Molly. After enticing Batman with a couple of clues, Riddler and Molly (as Robin) lead Batman on a chase outside the abandoned turtle mill at Orleans Cove before their Rolls-Royce is damaged by the Batray. The Riddler makes his escape as Molly tricks Batman into taking her into the Batcave. However, on the way, Batman spots the defect in the mask caused by the straws they gave Robin through which to breathe and discreetly disables Molly's gun. An unmasked Molly, after making an unsuccessful attempt to shoot Batman, tries to escape; Batman chases her to the top of the atomic pile (used to power the Batmobile), where she lets go of Batman's hand and falls to her death.

Batman rescues the true Robin and tells him that Molly is dead, but the Riddler manages to escape to the Moldavian Pavilion, where a gathering will honor the famous Mammoth of Moldavia, which is stuffed with used, yet priceless Moldavian postage stamps. The Riddler plans to steal the mammoth, and so he drenches the pavilion with nitrous oxide, dresses in a green and pink tuxedo costume and elephant mask which conceals his gas mask, and entertains the guests with a few jokes until everyone has fallen unconscious from laughter. The Riddler and the Mole Hill mob blast a hole through the floor and make ready to steal the priceless pachyderm when Batman and Robin leap out from inside the elephant and subdue the mob, whilst The Riddler runs for the man hole and leaps into it. Batman leaps after him, and Riddler shoots at him, misses, and hits a tank of noxious oxide causing it to explode, but not before Batman takes cover. The Riddler's body isn't recovered, so it's assumable he will live to plague Gotham City another day, but not if Batman and Robin can help it.
