= The Joker Is Wild (Batman) =

- Batman episode
- Episode no.: Season 1 Episode 5
- Directed by: Don Weis
- Written by: Robert Dozier
- Production code: 8709-Pt. 1
- Original air date: January 26, 1966

Guest appearances
- Merritt Bohn; Jonathan Hole; Nancy Kovack; Dick Curtis; Jerry Dunphy; Al Wyatt; Angelo DeMeo; Cesar Romero as The Joker

Episode chronology
← Previous "The Penguin's a Jinx"	Next → "Batman Is Riled"

"The Joker Is Wild" is an episode of the Batman television series in its first season, most notable for being Cesar Romero's debut as the Joker. It was first telecast as the fifth episode on ABC January 26, 1966, and was rerun on May 25, 1966, and May 24, 1967.

== Plot synopsis ==
The story begins with the Joker in prison pitching in (and enjoying) a ballgame. After a few pitches, the catcher switches the ball with one he has stashed in his padding, and tells the Joker, "This is the one". As the batter hits the ball, a smoke cloud appears, and before anyone knows what has happened, the Joker escapes using a spring-loaded device that propels him over the prison wall. The only thing the Joker leaves behind is a statue of his face and bust that was concealed under the spring contraption.

Batman and Robin go to the museum to check everything out — they were suspicious the Joker would strike there in revenge because he had not been entered into The Comedians' Hall of Fame. When they arrive, they find out that the Joker's statue is indeed there, and deduce he must be somewhere else. After everything's locked up, they realize that no one can break in, but that doesn't mean someone who isn't already in the building couldn't break out. This means the Joker's gang is likely already inside the building. Reentering the museum, they find the Joker trying to steal the valuable jewels inside, with henchmen named after comedy stars who were hidden inside the busts.

When the fight ensues, Batman is knocked unconscious from a falling antique sword that had been hanging on the wall. As they are carrying Robin and him away, he uses a gas pellet from his utility belt. The Joker escapes out a trap door while his henchmen are gathered up. After being defeated once again by Batman's utility belt, a fed-up Joker decides to make his own. While in his hideout, the Joker comes up with an idea to steal the S.S. Gotham (from his henchwoman). He plans to eliminate Batman so he can take the ship. Bruce Wayne and Dick Grayson arrive at the commissioners office for talk on the S.S. Gotham. While there, a clown doll is thrown through the window. Bruce Wayne asks to take it for a souvenir, and back at the Batcave, Batman and Robin try to figure out what the Joker is up to. They come up with the idea that the Joker will be at The Gotham City Opera Company, where the Pagliacci aria "Vesti la giubba" is being performed. While at the opera, Batman and Robin are caught when the Joker throws sneezing powder in their faces, and his henchmen grab our heroes. A horrified audience watches the Joker make a move to unmask Batman and Robin.

== Notes ==
- This episode is based on "The Joker's Utility Belt", a 1952 comic story published in Batman #73.
- The Joker's henchwoman Queenie originated in the comic books in the 1940s. In that story, as the Joker's cohort, she learned Bruce Wayne was Batman but was killed, taking the information with her.
- Writer Robert Dozier is the son of Batman executive producer William Dozier.
- Both Jose Ferrer and Gig Young were considered for the role of the Joker. After Romero was cast, Frank Sinatra expressed interest in playing the role.
- Cesar Romero refused to shave his mustache which gave him his career, so they had to cover it with makeup as well.
- The aliases of The Joker's henchmen are named after legendary (and deceased) comedians: Stan Laurel, Oliver Hardy, W.C. Fields, and Ernie Kovacs.
- During the fight scene near the middle of this episode, the typical fight scene music does not play as it usually does.
- Batman's chest emblem is inconsistent in the episode. When the Dynamic Duo are at the museum early in the episode, the logo is printed directly on the suit as it is most early episodes, is somewhat faded and shows creases in some shots. It also sits higher than usual on his chest in most indoor shots, closer to its appearance in the comics. In the rest of the episode, the emblem is brighter, glossier and is a separate piece onto his costume seemingly covering the logo that is printed on the fabric. This logo would be seen in episodes produced after this two-parter (several episodes aired after this one were shot earlier as indicated by their production codes).
- A closeup shot of the bookcase opening to reveal the Batpoles is reused from the pilot episode and the wooden trim that was added around the bookcase is missing in that shot.
- The mask worn by Heath Ledger's Joker in the opening scene of The Dark Knight is almost identical to the one worn by the Joker during his performance in Pagliacci.
- The Joker appears hugely excited about unmasking Batman in the theatre scene, and yet shows no subsequent interest in unmasking the duo during the whole series.

Preceded by The Penguin's a Jinx (airdate January 20, 1966)	Batman (TV series) episodes January 26, 1966	Succeeded by Batman Is Riled (airdate January 27, 1966)
