= WCAN =

WCAN may refer to:

- WCAN (FM) (93.3 FM) in Canajoharie, New York, a broadcast relay station of WAMC in Albany, New York
- WCAN-TV (channel 25), a former Milwaukee, Wisconsin television station which operated from 1953 to 1955
- WSSP (1250 AM) in Milwaukee, Wisconsin, which held the WCAN call sign from 1952 to 1955
- WCAN (AM) (833 AM) a former Jacksonville, Florida radio station which held the WCAN call sign in 1922
