= Fine Feathered Finks =

- Batman episode
- Episode no.: Season 1 Episode 3
- Directed by: Robert Butler
- Written by: Lorenzo Semple Jr.
- Production code: 8703-Pt. 1
- Original air date: January 19, 1966 (ABC)

Guest appearances
- David Lewis, Walter Burke, Lewis Charles, Robert Phillips, Alex D'Arcy, Johnny Jacobs, Leslie Parrish, Dan Tobin; Special Guest Villain: Burgess Meredith as The Penguin

Episode chronology
| ← Previous "Smack in the Middle" | Next → "The Penguin's a Jinx" |

"Fine Feathered Finks" is a first-season episode of Batman, first airing as its third episode on ABC January 19, 1966. It was repeated on August 31, 1966, and May 17, 1967. Burgess Meredith made his debut as The Penguin in this episode.

== Plot synopsis ==
Awaiting release from prison, the Penguin, the "pompous, waddling master of fowl play", schemes to get Batman to plan his crimes for him; his first step is to attract Batman's attention. Penguin has his henchmen Hawkeye and Sparrow distribute free umbrellas to patrons outside the House of Ali Baba Jewelry store and a local bank. The men passing them out call it a promotion, but the owners of the jewelry store and bank know that they were not hired by them.

While everyone's inside with the umbrellas, they explode and start spinning and cause a distraction, however even though it was the perfect setup for Hawkeye and Sparrow to commit a robbery, no heist was pulled. When Commissioner James Gordon hears of it, he knows Penguin has returned and calls Batman and Robin in to investigate. Along with Warden Crichton, they view Penguin's security camera from prison but are able to find out little on his next crime except he has the idea of somehow making Batman help him. Batman and Robin decide to pay a call on Penguin, who, under the alias K.G. Bird ("cagey bird") now operates an umbrella factory and shop, but they cannot contradict his denials. As soon as they leave, Penguin launches a giant umbrella, featuring a multicolored umbrella (complete with Oswald's hidden transmitter) attached to its handle, from his store's roof.

The umbrella lands in the middle of the street, and the Duo investigate. While they discover nothing special about it beyond its immense size, they do retrieve the normal-sized umbrella that is hanging from the giant's handle. Convinced it's a clue to Penguin's next crime, Batman and Robin take the umbrella back with them to the Batcave to further examine it. Unable to discover the significance of the Batbrella, Batman goes in his true identity as Bruce Wayne inside the umbrella store and, while the Penguin is not looking, he plants a tiny transistor microphone (disguised as a spider) there so they can find out what he's up to.

Bruce apparently did not count on the Penguin actually installing a burglar alarm in his store, and a siren goes off to alert there is a bug being placed in the room. The Penguin, Hawkeye and Sparrow immediately release a net on Bruce and, unaware of his identity but mistaking him for a spy from a rival and competing umbrella store, the Penguin knocks him out with his "gas-umbrella". He then has Hawkeye and Sparrow tie him up and toss him into the furnace. Still entangled in the net, Bruce is placed on a conveyor belt that leads to the 10,000 degree furnace.

== Notes ==
- Burgess Meredith and Cesar Romero were the most frequent "guest villains" as The Penguin and The Joker, respectively. In fact, whenever Meredith was in town the producers had a script waiting for him. He had given up smoking for years when he was cast in the role of The Penguin. The squawk in his voice came from the way the cigarette smoke affected his lungs and throat.
- In this episode, Burgess Meredith refers to Batman as "The Batman", a title that was used briefly in 1939–40, then revived in 1970.
- This is David Lewis' first appearance as Warden Crichton.
- Mickey Rooney was considered for the role of The Penguin.
- The episode is based on "Partners in Plunder!" from Batman #169 (February 1965), written by France Eddie Herron; the only difference being The Penguin steals the jeweled meteorite (which was mentioned in the comic), instead of kidnapping Dawn Robbins (who did not appear in the comic). This is alluded to when the Penguin announces that he and Batman will be "partners in plunder".
- This is the first occasion in the television series on which Batman and Bruce Wayne work "together" to foil a criminal's plot. This theme would be very regularly used in future episodes.

| Preceded by Smack in the Middle (airdate January 13, 1966) | Batman (TV series) episodes January 19, 1966 | Succeeded by The Penguin's a Jinx (airdate January 20, 1966) |
