= Jerry Dunphy =

American television news anchor

- Born: June 9, 1921; Milwaukee, Wisconsin, US
- Died: May 20, 2002 (aged 80); Los Angeles, California, US
- Occupation: News anchor
- Years active: 1953-2002
- Employer(s): Milwaukee: WXIX (1953-1959); Chicago: WBBM-TV (1959-1960); Los Angeles: KNXT/KCBS-TV (1960-1975 and 1995-1996); KABC-TV (1976-1989); KHJ-TV/KCAL-TV (1989-1995 and 1997-2002)

Jerry Dunphy (June 9, 1921 – May 20, 2002) was an American television news anchor in the Los Angeles/Southern California media market. He was best known for his intro "From the desert to the sea, to all of Southern California, a good evening."

== Biography ==
=== Career ===
After serving as a pilot in World War II, where he was awarded the Distinguished Flying Cross and three Air Medals, Dunphy began his broadcast television career in 1953. He was the news director/anchor at then-CBS owned-and-operated (O&O) WXIX (now CW affiliated WVTV) in Milwaukee. Dunphy also was a sports reporter at another CBS O&O, WBBM-TV, in Chicago. Dunphy also served as a color commentator for Green Bay Packers telecasts on CBS in 1956.

In 1960, Dunphy took over the anchor chair at the Los Angeles CBS O&O station KNXT (now KCBS-TV), where he anchored Los Angeles' most popular newscast, later titled The Big News, a program that often attracted a quarter of Los Angeles television owners, ratings unheard of in the market. He was still popular when fired in 1975, yet KNXT sought to adopt a faster-paced news format (known as Channel 2 News around the time of Dunphy's firing) similar to KABC-TV's Eyewitness News. It was then that Dunphy joined KABC-TV, bringing it to the top of the ratings, making it Southern California's news leader. After Dunphy's firing, Channel 2 wouldn't recover in the ratings until the mid-2000s. Dunphy left KABC-TV in July 1989 and joined the upstart KCAL-TV that July (when it was still KHJ-TV) as one of the pioneering anchors of the three-hour primetime news format, Prime 9 News. He returned to KCBS-TV in February 1995 as a late afternoon anchor for Channel 2 Action News. However, due to CBS' merger with Westinghouse Electric Corporation, Dunphy was dismissed from KCBS-TV in March 1996. He returned to KCAL-TV in November 1997, where he anchored K-CAL 9 News until his death in May 2002.

Dunphy was one of the first newscasters to interview President Richard Nixon after his resignation in 1974. He would later sit down with Ronald Reagan, Jimmy Carter, and Gerald Ford. Dunphy also performed regular cameos in L.A.-based films including Warning Shot (1967), Night of the Lepus (1972), Oh God! (1977), Hard To Kill (1990), Short Cuts (1993), The Jerky Boys (1995) and Independence Day (1996), as well as in sixth episode of Batman (1966), and is considered to be the inspiration for two fictional television characters: Ted Baxter on The Mary Tyler Moore Show and Kent Brockman on The Simpsons (the director of "Krusty Gets Busted", Brad Bird, designed the character and modeled him after anchorman Ted Koppel).

Dunphy was also a songwriter. One of his songs was called, appropriately, "From the Desert to the Sea" and was recorded by country music star T.G. Sheppard.

=== Personal life and death ===
Dunphy was born in Milwaukee, Wisconsin. He was attacked and shot in the neck by 4 would-be robbers in 1983 but made a full recovery.

On May 9, 1984, Dunphy received a star on the Hollywood Walk of Fame for his work in the television industry, located at 6669 Hollywood Boulevard.

Although he had suffered two previous heart attacks in 1978 and 1991, he had been in good health and had even anchored broadcasts the week before his death on May 20, 2002.

On this night, former Los Angeles Lakers broadcaster Chick Hearn (who himself would pass away in August of that same year), while doing play-by-play for a Lakers playoff game on KCAL, announced that Dunphy had suffered a heart attack. After the game went off the air, KCAL co-anchor Pat Harvey, fighting back tears, announced Dunphy's death on the 10 PM newscast:

Los Angeles has forever changed tonight, because Jerry Dunphy will never come into your home again. Our beloved anchorman and friend has died. Jerry touched the lives of generations of Angelenos for more than 40 years; a beacon of truth and trust, and for all to turn to in good times and in bad.

When KCBS-TV/KCAL-TV moved into its new studios at CBS Studio Center in 2007, a newsroom was named in Dunphy's honor. KCAL news promos still occasionally incorporate Dunphy's "from the desert to the sea to all of southern California" phrase, with other anchors speaking the lines in reference to their program's wide range of coverage.

He had six children: Jerry Dunphy Jr., Karen Dunphy, Linda Curb, Tad Dunphy, Megan Dunphy and Erin Dunphy.

He is interred at Forest Lawn Memorial Park in the Hollywood Hills of Los Angeles.

== Filmography ==
Year	Title	Role	Notes
1963	The Prize	American TV News Correspondent	Uncredited
1964	The Patsy	TV Newscaster	Uncredited
1964	Kitten with a Whip	Newscaster	
1964	Goodbye Charlie	Television Newscaster	Uncredited
1965	Mirage	TV Newscaster	Uncredited
1967	The Reluctant Astronaut	TV Newscaster	Uncredited
1967	Warning Shot	Himself - TV newscaster	
1971	The Love Machine	Newscaster	
1972	Night of the Lepus	Television Newscaster	
1977	Oh God!	Himself	
1990	Hard to Kill	Newscaster	
1990	Impulse	TV Anchorman	
1993	Short Cuts	Himself	
1994	Jimmy Hollywood	Anchorperson	
1994	Beverly Hills Cop III	Newscaster	
1995	The Jerky Boys	World News Now Anchorman	
1996	Independence Day	Himself	
1998	Bulworth	Himself	
2000	Dropping Out	Newscaster	
2000	3 Strikes	Himself (Newscaster)	
2003	Pauly Shore Is Dead	Himself	(final film role)

== See also ==
- Laura Diaz
- Todd Donoho
- Christine Devine
