= WTMJ-TV =

Television station in Milwaukee

- Milwaukee, Wisconsin; United States
- Channels: Digital: 32 (UHF); Virtual: 4
- Branding: TMJ 4

Programming
- Affiliations: 4.1: NBC; for others, see § Subchannels

Ownership
- Owner: E. W. Scripps Company; (Scripps Broadcasting Holdings LLC)
- Sister stations: WPXE-TV

History
- First air date: December 3, 1947 (commercial license; previously experimental from 1931–1947)
- Former channel numbers: Analog: 3 (VHF, 1947–1953), 4 (VHF, 1953–2009); Digital: 28 (UHF, until 2019)
- Former affiliations: CBS, ABC and DuMont (secondary, 1949–1953)
- Call sign meaning: The Milwaukee Journal, derived from WTMJ

Technical information
- Licensing authority: FCC
- Facility ID: 74098
- ERP: 1,000 kW
- HAAT: 304.6 m (999 ft)
- Transmitter coordinates: 43°5′29″N 87°54′7″W

Links
- Public license information: Public file; LMS
- Website: www.tmj4.com

WTMJ-TV (channel 4) is a television station in Milwaukee, Wisconsin, United States, affiliated with NBC. It is owned by the E. W. Scripps Company alongside Ion Television station WPXE-TV (channel 55). WTMJ-TV's studios and transmitter are located on Capitol Drive (WIS 190), approximately four miles (6.4 km) north of downtown Milwaukee (an Art Deco facility that is known as "Radio City", in tribute to the New York complex of the same name).

From its inception until October 31, 2018, WTMJ-TV was a sister station to WTMJ radio (620 AM) and WKTI (94.5 FM). The radio stations are now owned by Good Karma Brands and departed Radio City for a studio within the Third Street Market Hall in early 2022, but continue to share some operations (including a long-term weather forecasting agreement and engineering staff) with Scripps and WTMJ-TV. In January 2021, WTMJ-TV became a sister station to WPXE-TV, after Ion and its stations were purchased by Scripps; it had previously been operated by WTMJ-TV under a joint sales agreement (JSA) from 2000 to 2005.

== History ==
=== Journal Communications ownership ===
The Journal Company (owner of the Milwaukee Journal, which was consolidated with the Milwaukee Sentinel in 1995 to become the Milwaukee Journal Sentinel) was granted its first television station license in September 1931 for W9XD. The experimental station used a low-definition electromechanical system to transmit its signal, and conducted field tests from 1931 to 1933; in 1934, Journal converted W9XD's facilities to experimental high-fidelity apex radio unit W9XAZ in 1934. Its license was withdrawn by the Federal Communications Commission (FCC) in 1938 as part of an effort to limit broadcast licenses to stations that would actively engage in the development of television. No publicly announced television programming was broadcast by W9XD during this experimental period.

The Journal Company obtained one of the first construction permits issued by the FCC for a commercial television station on December 7, 1941, under the call letters WMJT (for "Milwaukee Journal Television"), and built a new broadcast facility to transmit its signal by August 1942. However, the company's television plans were suspended when the U.S. War Production Board halted the manufacturing of television and radio broadcasting equipment for civilian use from April 1942 to August 1945, in order for such equipment to be allocated for use by the military during World War II.

The station's call sign was later modified to WTMJ-TV (referencing The Milwaukee Journal), which first signed on the air on December 3, 1947, originally broadcasting on VHF channel 3. In addition to being the first commercial television station to sign on the air in Wisconsin, the fourth such station to sign on in the Midwestern United States and the 15th to launch in the United States, WTMJ was also the first station located outside of the Eastern Time Zone to be affiliated with a major broadcast television network. At the time it began operations, there were only 500 television sets in Milwaukee; that number would jump to 2,050 by the following April. The existence of television sets in Milwaukee before WTMJ-TV even debuted was because the city is close enough to Chicago that television stations from that market could be and still are viewable in Milwaukee; therefore, residents in southeastern Wisconsin had access to WBKB, which signed on from Chicago in 1946 as the first commercially licensed television station outside of the Eastern Time Zone.

At its official sign-on, it was one of several flagship media properties owned by Journal, which in addition to the Journal newspaper, also owned radio stations WTMJ (620 AM) and WTMJ-FM 93.3 (which shut down in 1950). In 1959, these properties were joined by a new WTMJ-FM 94.5. WTMJ-TV has been affiliated with NBC since its sign-on, owing to its radio sister's longtime affiliation with the NBC Radio Network; although, it also initially carried programming from CBS, ABC and the DuMont Television Network. It lost its secondary affiliation with CBS when WCAN-TV (channel 25) signed on in September 1953, and lost access to ABC and DuMont programming when WOKY-TV (channel 19, now WVTV on channel 18) made its debut one month later. WTMJ is the only television station in Milwaukee to have been affiliated with the same network throughout its history, and is currently NBC's second-longest tenured affiliate, behind only KSDK in St. Louis (which signed on as KSD-TV eleven months earlier in January 1947).

On July 11, 1953, WTMJ-TV moved to VHF channel 4, in order to alleviate interference with WKZO-TV in Kalamazoo, Michigan, which is located nearly directly across Lake Michigan. The relocation of the station's channel allocation was a part of the FCC's complete revision of its Table of Channel Assignments, as issued in the Sixth Report and General Order issued by the agency on April 14, 1952. This move forced the CBS O&O on channel 4 in Chicago, WBBM-TV (the former WBKB), to be reassigned to VHF channel 2; WBBM had moved to that frequency six days before WTMJ's channel relocation on July 5, 1953.

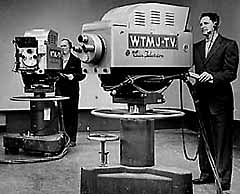
WTMJ's RCA TK-41 cameras in service during the 1950s-1960s timeframe. It was one of the first stations in the U.S. to produce local color programming.

WTMJ-TV was one of the first television stations in the United States to purchase color equipment to transmit and produce programming in the format; in December 1953, it broadcast NBC's color telecast of Amahl and the Night Visitors, when only two prototype color sets existed in Milwaukee. The first color television sets in the city were sold in March 1954; by July of that year, WTMJ became the third television station in the U.S. with live color capability, when it broadcast its first local color program that originated from its studios, The Grenadiers. About 3,000 color sets existed in Milwaukee in February 1957.

Over time, Journal gradually expanded its television chain, acquiring, among other stations, KTNV-TV in Las Vegas (acquired in 1979); KIVI-TV in Boise, Idaho (acquired in 2002); KMTV-TV in Omaha and KGUN-TV in Tucson, Arizona (both acquired in 2005); WGBA-TV and WACY-TV in Green Bay (the former being acquired in August 2004, with the latter operated under a local marketing agreement until Journal acquired it outright in 2012); and WTVF in Nashville (acquired in 2012).

WTMJ inaugurated the "Today's TMJ4" brand on July 25, 1992, coinciding with the start of NBC's coverage of that year's Summer Olympics (variants of this brand, whether they incorporated the last three letters of the call sign or not, were later used by other stations such as KTHV in Little Rock and WTMJ sister station KIVI-TV in Boise). The first generation of the "TMJ4" branding lasted until August 13, 2004, on the date NBC began its coverage of the 2004 Summer Olympics, as part of a graphical overhaul that resulted in the retirement of the "sailboat 4" logo that had been in use by the station since 1980. "Today's" was dropped from the branding on February 25, 2020, as part of a corporate roll-out of new news graphics.

In 2000, Journal entered into a joint sales agreement (JSA) with Kenosha-licensed WPXE-TV (channel 55), resulting indirectly from NBC's partial ownership interest in WPXE owner Paxson Communications (forerunner to Ion Media) and a related management agreement with that network's owned-and-operated stations. Under the JSA, the two stations shared certain programs, while WTMJ handled advertising sales services for channel 55; the agreement also allowed WPXE to air rebroadcasts of channel 4's 6 and 10 p.m. newscasts on a half-hour delay, and WPXE moved its operations to the WTMJ studios. Though the agreement was slated to last 10 years, Paxson Communications terminated all joint sales agreements involving its stations on July 1, 2005, concurrent with the rebranding of the Pax network as i: Independent Television (now Ion Television). However, WTMJ continues to provide engineering assistance for WPXE-TV.

==== Summer 2013 Time Warner Cable carriage dispute ====
Due to a dispute between the cable provider and Journal Communications, WTMJ-TV was removed from Time Warner Cable's southeastern Wisconsin systems at midnight on July 25, 2013, four days before the provider's agreement with Journal was set to expire on July 30; the dispute between the companies also affected Journal-owned stations in four other markets (WGBA-TV and WACY-TV in Green Bay, KMTV-TV in Omaha and KMIR-TV in Palm Springs, California); The Local AccuWeather Channel and Live Well Network subchannels were pulled from TWC's systems two weeks earlier on July 10 as they were not protected under the sweeps rule that prohibits cable providers from pulling the main signal of a carried station (such as WTMJ 4.1) during such ratings periods, including that occurring in July. On August 15, GSN replaced WTMJ on its designated channel 4 slot, while Starz Kids & Family replaced the two subchannels on digital channels 994 and 999, before being replaced by the Hallmark Movie Channel in September.

On August 8, a group of Time Warner Cable subscribers filed a class action lawsuit against the provider in a Wisconsin District Court under grounds of breach of contract. Journal Broadcast Group claimed on its website that TWC was distracted due to its dispute with CBS Corporation (which resulted in the removals of CBS Television Stations outlets in select markets and the Showtime Networks premium channel suite nationwide, until it signed a new agreement on September 2, 2013). Journal also asked state authorities to intervene in the dispute.

WTMJ was restored at 7 p.m. on September 20, 2013, as a result of a new carriage agreement between Journal and TWC. WTMJ was relocated to cable channel 2 (GSN remained on channel 4). WTMJ's high definition feed stayed on digital channel 1004, with Journal executives citing that the HD slot was more important than the declining analog and standard definition viewership. In the Racine, Kenosha and Plymouth areas, WTMJ was placed on channel 83 while Time Warner sought a lower channel slot. This also left WTMJ's subchannels off Time Warner systems, making them only receivable over-the-air as they are not carried on Charter Communications's legacy systems pre-Time Warner Cable merger, DirecTV and Dish Network.

=== Management realignment and sale to Scripps ===
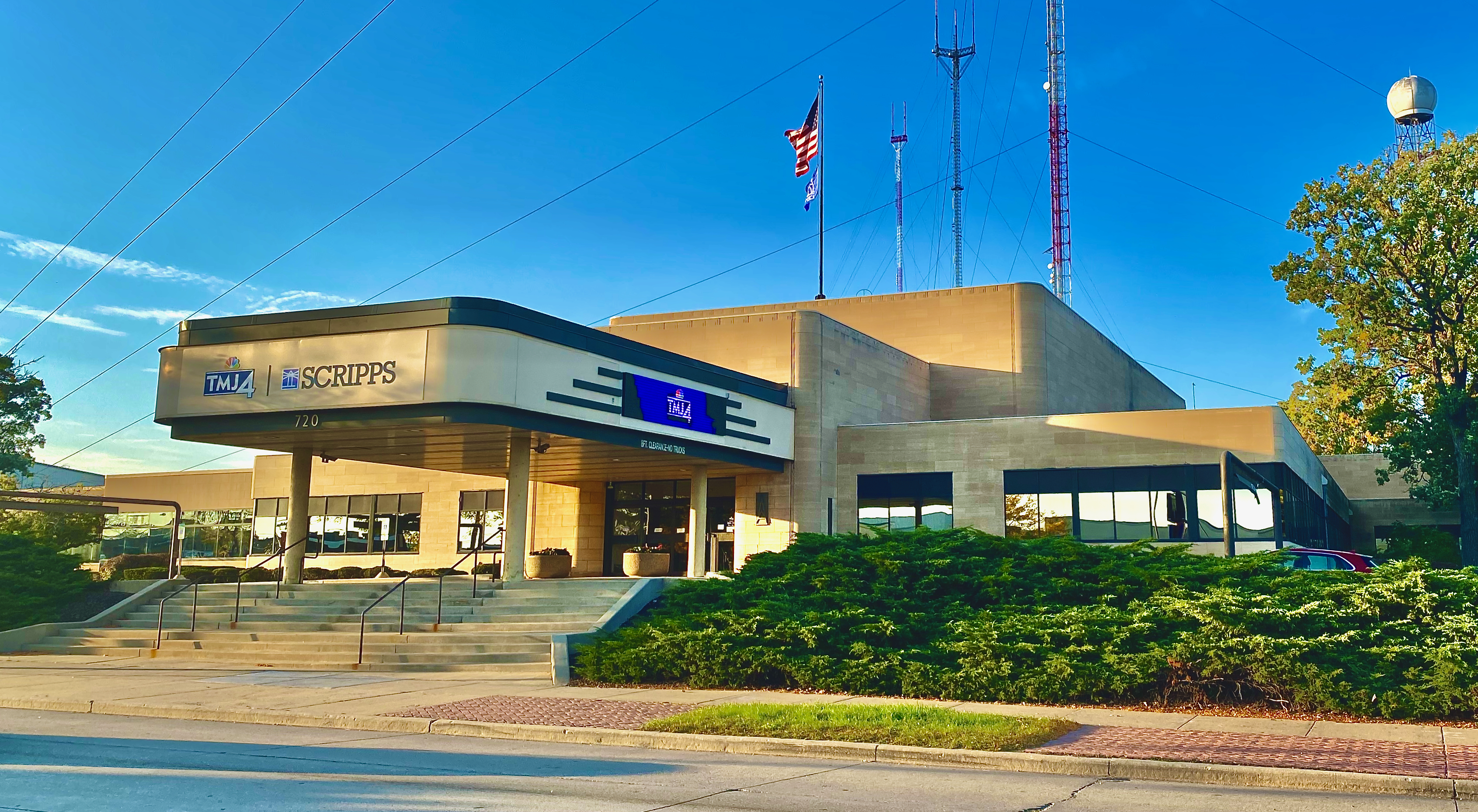
Radio City on Capitol Drive on Milwaukee's northeast side, the home of WTMJ-TV since its founding.

In the winter of 2014, Journal made several management changes to split responsibilities between its radio and television division. Some of the changes included the appointments of Debbie Turner (executive vice president and general manager at WTVF) as the company's vice president of television, Steve Wexler (executive vice president of Journal's Milwaukee radio and television properties) as executive vice president for the company's radio division, and Joe Poss (general manager of Journal's Green Bay duopoly of WGBA/WACY) as WTMJ-TV's general manager. Janet Hundley (longtime assistant news director at ABC O&O WLS-TV in Chicago) was also hired as the station's news director in May 2014, following the resignation of Bill Berra.

On July 30, 2014, the E. W. Scripps Company announced that it would acquire Journal Communications in an all-stock transaction. The combined firm would retain their broadcast properties—including WTMJ-TV and its AM and FM radio siblings—with the print assets being spun off as Journal Media Group. The deal was approved by the FCC on December 12, 2014, with shareholders of the two companies approving it on March 11, 2015; the merger/spin-off between Journal and Scripps formally closed on April 1 (Journal Media Group would be subsequently acquired by the Gannett Company—which spun off its own broadcasting and digital media properties into Tegna Inc. three months after the Journal split was completed, in order to focus on its newspapers—in August 2015). Through its ownership by Journal, WTMJ had been one of the few television stations in the country not owned by a major network that had the same call sign, owner and primary network affiliation throughout its history; it was also the last major television station in the Milwaukee market to be locally owned.

E. W. Scripps and Time Warner Cable announced a new multi-year carriage agreement on February 1, 2016 (well ahead of the 2016 Summer Olympics), that included WTMJ. With this agreement, Scripps also obtained carriage for WTMJ's subchannels as of April 4, 2016, which took the channel 990 and 991 slots on area Time Warner systems.

=== Duopoly with WPXE-TV ===
On September 24, 2020, a consortium made up of Scripps and Berkshire Hathaway announced the proposed purchase of Ion Media for $2.65 billion, including WPXE-TV. The sale was completed on January 7, 2021, with WPXE-TV becoming a sister station to WTMJ-TV.

== Subchannel history ==
=== WTMJ-DT2 (Bounce TV) ===
On March 1, 2006, WTMJ-TV launched a digital subchannel on virtual channel 4.2 as TMJ4 Weather Plus, a 24-hour weather channel featuring a mix of local and national current conditions and forecasts as well as local weather updates from the station's meteorologists; until the July 2013 dispute with Journal, it was previously carried on Time Warner Cable digital channel 999. The subchannel originally served as an affiliate of NBC Weather Plus; three months after it was launched, in June 2006, WTMJ rebranded its weather department from "Storm Team 4" to "TMJ4 Weather Plus", integrating the network brand into its weather branding in compliance with Weather Plus' recommended standardizations for its affiliated NBC stations. After NBC Weather Plus was discontinued in November 2008, the former "Storm Team 4" brand was restored as its universal weather branding; the subchannel itself rebranded as the Storm Team 4 Channel on January 1, 2009, and was later renamed "Storm Team 4 TV". In mid-December 2009, Storm Team 4 TV became an affiliate of The Local AccuWeather Channel. Uniquely, the station shared the market's AccuWeather affiliation with PBS member station (and Milwaukee PBS flagship) WMVS (channel 10), which broadcasts a non-commercial version of the AccuWeather Channel on its 10.4 (currently WMVT-DT3) subchannel.

In mid-December 2014 with the operations of Local AccuWeather winding down as AccuWeather refocused its television efforts on its cable-satellite channel, WTMJ converted the 4.2 subchannel to a widescreen format, and reformatted it to incorporate additional traffic camera loops, feature segments and a news ticker to the new internally originated setup as "TMJ4 Plus", using website partner WorldNow's "channel in a box" coordinating automation technology.

On September 28, 2015, as part of an agreement that Scripps signed with Katz Broadcasting on May 18 in which WTMJ would affiliate with two of Katz's three multicast networks (MyNetworkTV affiliate WCGV-TV (channel 24) had previously carried Grit over their DT3 channel through a separate agreement with that station's owner, Sinclair Broadcast Group, as described below in the section for WTMJ-DT4), WTMJ fully discontinued TMJ4 Plus and converted WTMJ-DT2 into an affiliate of Laff.

In March 2021, Bounce TV was launched on 4.2, while Laff moved to 4.6.

=== WTMJ-DT3 (Ion Mystery) ===
In early July 2009, WTMJ launched digital channel 4.3 as an affiliate of TheCoolTV, becoming the first full-power station to carry the music video and concert programming-focused network as a digital subchannel; it was later carried by stations owned by the Sinclair Broadcast Group (except for WVTV (channel 18) and WCGV-TV locally due to WTMJ's carriage of the network) and LIN TV; WTMJ's Green Bay sister station WGBA also added TheCoolTV in November 2010. The subchannel, which locally had its on-air playlist customized by WTMJ, was co-branded with WTMJ-TV's sister radio station WLWK-FM (the former WTMJ-FM), which then had a format spanning a variety of decades. In September 2011, Journal Communications filed a $257,000 lawsuit against TheCoolTV's parent company Cool Music Network, LLC, alleging non-payment of broadcast services since before June 2011.

Because of the dispute, WTMJ replaced TheCoolTV with the Live Well Network on October 1 (WGBA, meanwhile, replaced it with MeTV on that date). WTMJ eventually converted the channel's aspect ratio to 480i widescreen, optimized for 16:9 displays, in line with LWN's default screen presentation; select Live Well programming (consisting of Motion and Deals) was broadcast in high definition during Saturday late night slots on the station's main channel until the network was removed. On January 12, 2015, one week before Live Well Network was to originally discontinue operations entirely (its distribution would instead be relegated exclusively to ABC Owned Television Stations outlets after a three-month reprieve from its planned nationwide shutdown), it was replaced on WTMJ-DT3 with the NBC-owned subchannel service Cozi TV.

Through the same agreement with Katz Broadcasting under which the station affiliated WTMJ-DT2 with Laff, WTMJ-TV was listed as a future affiliate of Escape. It was not added right away, as WTMJ's agreement with NBC to carry Cozi had not yet expired and the station did not want to compromise picture quality with a fourth subchannel before a later multiplexer upgrade. Instead, WTMJ and DTV America's WTSJ-LP (channel 38) arranged a trade where Escape was carried on that station's third subchannel until November 2016, then was removed until January 1, 2017, when WTMJ's Cozi affiliation expired. WTMJ picked up Escape that day, with WTSJ taking Cozi for their third subchannel on January 15. Cozi then established another affiliation on June 22, 2017, with WIWN (channel 68.1), acquiring the Charter legacy carriage it never was able to with WTMJ. The network was rebranded as Court TV Mystery on September 30, 2019, to take advantage of the latter's brand equity; it rebranded again to Ion Mystery in February 2022.

=== WTMJ-DT4 (Grit) ===
WTMJ launched their fourth subchannel in mid-December 2017, though it started with only a blank image merely to activate the channel. It began to carry Grit in early March 2018, after WCGV-TV (channel 24) left the air on January 8, 2018, and merged their two other existing subchannels onto WVTV due to the spectrum auction. This left Grit and getTV without a channel in the market (getTV eventually moved to WIWN-DT4), and Scripps decided to consolidate the network onto WTMJ after their purchase of Katz Broadcasting, the parent of Escape, Grit and Laff (along with Bounce TV, which will remain with WMLW-TV for the time being).

=== WTMJ-DT5 (Court TV) ===
In late April 2019, WTMJ was revealed as launching a fifth digital subchannel for Katz's relaunch of Court TV on May 8, 2019.

== Programming ==
After several years of eschewing syndicated programming to ramp up their news schedule on weekdays, WTMJ began to carry syndicated shows again during the 3 p.m. hour (which, during its final years under Journal, was filled by an hour-long newscast that led off its evening news lineup) under Scripps ownership. During the weekends, Alliant Energy Powerhouse and the brokered religious program Time of Grace are carried; the latter is carried by many stations in Milwaukee and throughout Wisconsin in varying timeslots under the same arrangement. Another program the station produces outside of news is the brokered New Home Building Today on Sunday mornings, which is usually produced by a local homebuilder with the assistance of WTMJ's advertising/sales department to sell a home and/or subdivision plot.

WTMJ had been the long-time Milwaukee home for the nighttime syndicated version of Wheel of Fortune beginning in 1984 (replacing the nighttime Family Feud, which moved to WITI for the final season of its first incarnation; WITI, in turn, aired the first season of nighttime Wheel) and Jeopardy! from its 1984 premiere; both shows moved to CBS affiliate WDJT-TV (channel 58) in September 2005. It was also the first station to air The Oprah Winfrey Show from the program's 1986 syndication launch until a group-wide distribution deal with Hearst Broadcasting resulted in it being moved to ABC affiliate WISN-TV (channel 12) in September 1993 until the show's ending in May 2011. WTMJ (and WPXE, during the run of its LMA with Journal) had aired Martha Stewart Living and then The Martha Stewart Show until September 2007, when the latter program moved to WISN. Like NBC flagship WNBC in New York City, WTMJ aired It's Showtime at the Apollo after Saturday Night Live for its entire 21-year run, with Soul Train (another long-running syndicated staple since 1972, when it joined the station's lineup) following that show until its own end in 2006.

=== Past program preemptions and deferrals ===
From the 1960s to the 1990s, preemptions on the station were more common (examples include those involving NBC's daytime game show and soap opera lineup; Sanford and Son airing on Saturday nights instead of Fridays during the 1973–74 season, in which the sitcom's normal time slot was occupied by the second half-hour of The Lawrence Welk Show; and its removal of Gimme a Break! and Mama's Family from the schedule in favor of the syndicated drama Fame on Thursday nights during the 1983–84 season). Until 1974, WTMJ-TV aired a movie on nights when The Midnight Special wasn't airing; this preempted The Tomorrow Show. Although NBC had long been less tolerant of preemptions of its programming than the other networks, it usually did not raise objections to those made by WTMJ, since it has been one of the network's strongest affiliates. NBC was also helped by then-independent station WVTV often picking up NBC programs declined by channel 4 for their own schedule, with WCGV also doing so when that station signed on in March 1980.

The station's most controversial move came in 1979 when it asked NBC for permission to delay The Tonight Show to 11 p.m., in order to air reruns of Maude in the talk show's 10:30 slot; although the network vetoed the move (even though its Birmingham affiliate WAPI-TV/WVTM-TV had aired the program on delay from the time it cleared Tonight in 1967 until 1996), WTMJ went ahead and did it anyway as it was already running a promotional campaign for Maude and began delaying Tonight to 11 p.m. that September. It tried again in 1984, wanting to move Tonight to 11:30 p.m., in order to air reruns of Trapper John, M.D. after the 10 p.m. newscast starting that September. NBC, already not happy with WTMJ moving the program to 11 p.m., refused again, and opted to contract WVTV to carry the program instead, airing it at 10:30 p.m. from September 1984 to September 1988, when WTMJ gave in to airing the program in its network-designated timeslot.

The station also delayed Late Night with Conan O'Brien to 12:05 a.m. from the program's September 1993 debut until September 2001, and aired Days of Our Lives at 2 p.m. (one of the program's alternate network timeslots), before moving it to the network-standard 1 p.m. slot on September 10, 2007, to replace the canceled Montel Williams Show. (The soap opera moved exclusively to the network's streaming service Peacock effective September 12, 2022, with NBC News Daily taking over its 1 p.m. timeslot.) WTMJ aired paid programming in place of the low-rated prime time poker game show Face the Ace for its entire run starting in August 2009, marking the first time any Milwaukee station preempted a significant portion or the entirety of a prime time network series (other than for extended news coverage) since the early 1990s.

=== The Morning Blend ===
The Morning Blend is a local talk show format originated by former parent company Journal Broadcast Group and presently owned by the E. W. Scripps Company that first premiered in Milwaukee on WTMJ-TV on September 12, 2006 (originally airing at 10 a.m., the program moved to its current 9 a.m. slot in September 2007). As of 2015, the WTMJ version is currently hosted by Tiffany Ogle (who replaced original co-host – and former WISN reporter—Alison de Castro, after she left the program in October 2009 to relocate with her family to Chicago) and Molly Fay (formerly a morning anchor at WITI). The show—which derived its format from that of Daytime on fellow NBC affiliate WFLA-TV in Tampa—features a mix of paid and unpaid segments, with all segments promoting a certain product or company featuring on-air disclaimers to denote the segment has been leased by a particular advertiser. The program is produced through WTMJ's advertising sales department; as such, news segments are not provided by its hosts, with breaking news or severe weather coverage ceded to the station's news staff instead. In June 2008, The Morning Blend began airing on Green Bay sister station WGBA, also at 9 a.m., after that station dropped its morning newscasts (WGBA has since carried Today in pattern for its full four hours).

The Morning Blend is WTMJ's first attempt at a local program that was not news or public affairs-based since the short-lived A New Day premiered in 1979; that program was co-hosted by Terry Meeuwsen (now co-host of The 700 Club) and news anchor/radio host (and former WTMJ-TV reporter) Pete Wilson. The Morning Blend format and branding then was adapted by most of WTMJ's fellow Journal stations, and has now been added to several of its new Scripps sisters.

=== Sports programming ===
==== Green Bay Packers partnership ====
WTMJ-TV has served as Milwaukee's "official station" of the Green Bay Packers since the mid-1990s, giving it rights to air the team's non-nationally televised preseason games; in addition to the team's existing television broadcasters elsewhere in Wisconsin, the game telecasts are shared with sister stations WGBA in Green Bay and KMTV-TV in Omaha through a March 2012 broadcasting agreement between the Packers and former station parent Journal Broadcast Group. WTMJ holds the broadcast rights to the weekly coaches show (which airs Tuesdays at 6:30 p.m. during the NFL season) and other shows involving the team (such as the team's Sunday morning pre-game analysis program Packers Today). As part of the deal, Packers Radio Network color commentator Larry McCarren (who resigned as sports director at Green Bay CBS affiliate WFRV-TV in March 2012) now also serves as a Packers analyst for WTMJ and WGBA; until McCarren became WGBA's sports director upon the end of his non-compete clause with WFRV in April 2013, his segments appeared during the Packers Extra sports segment from the WTMJ set. McCarren resigned his sports director duties at WGBA at the end of March 2015 to solely focus on his Packers duties. In 2017, Scripps also began to air the "Family Night" scrimmage before the pre-season, which had previously been produced as a joint effort between the state's Fox affiliates under a separate contract.

Because of the Summer Olympics, which are not allowed any preemptions by the network except for urgent breaking news and severe weather, WTMJ sublicensed some preseason games to then-LMA partner WPXE-TV in 2004 and to CW affiliate WVTV in 2008 (the 2012 opening preseason game against the San Diego Chargers that occurred during the Olympics was an ESPN Monday Night Football broadcast carried by WISN, which averted the need for sublicensing any games that season). Beginning with the 2024 Summer Olympics, WPXE-TV resumed its role as the backup station for Packers preseason football in Olympic years, carrying the team's Family Night scrimmage and the first preseason game in Cleveland against the Browns that year. Regular season games televised over-the-air locally are split between WITI (channel 6; through Fox's rights to the team's parent division, the National Football Conference), and WDJT-TV (for select games televised by CBS in which the Packers play against an American Football Conference (AFC) opponent), with WTMJ carrying non-preseason games via NBC's Sunday Night Football on occasions when a game involving the Packers is scheduled, even if the game is a Peacock exclusive. In 2016, Weigel's independent station, WMLW-TV (channel 49) sublicensed and carry the second and third preseason games of that season due to 2016 Olympics coverage, making it unique in carrying two streams of the game (English and Spanish) over the same channel, as WMLW-DT4 simulcast Telemundo affiliate and Packers preseason Spanish carrier WYTU-LD (channel 63). WTMJ has also aired Packer games through NBC's NFL broadcast contracts from 1970 to 1997 (airing all interconference home contests in those years, when NBC held the AFC broadcast contract) and since 2006 for Sunday night games.

The station aired the team's first London appearance in the NFL International Series on October 9, 2022, against the New York Giants at Tottenham Hotspur Stadium, in a simulcast with NFL Network.

==== Milwaukee Brewers and Braves baseball ====
The Milwaukee Braves baseball club was the last team to hold out against televising any of its games locally before entering into a pact with WTMJ-TV for 15 telecasts in 1962. At the time, poor attendance and financial problems were seen as having forced the team's hand. In 1963, the team telecast five home games among 26 contests, and WTMJ-TV carried 30 games in 1964. The team was not telecast in 1965, its last season in Milwaukee before moving to Atlanta.

WTMJ-TV served as the original local television outlet for the Milwaukee Brewers, carrying at least 25 to 40 of the Major League Baseball team's games each season—mostly involving those played on the road—from 1970 to 1980. Among the broadcasters who worked on the WTMJ Brewers telecasts included Merle Harmon, Jim Irwin (who also worked as a sportscaster at WTMJ radio during this time, as well as serving the radio voice of the Packers and Wisconsin Badgers football), Eddie Doucette (then also the radio and television voice of the Milwaukee Bucks), Mike Hegan (who later became a longtime announcer for the Cleveland Indians), and longtime primary Brewers radio play-by-play announcer and Milwaukee native Bob Uecker. The team chose to move its telecasts to WVTV starting with the 1981 season, because that station (which was not affiliated with a network at the time) offered to televise more games per season than what WTMJ was able to do, due to Channel 4's NBC programming commitments.

=== News operation ===
WTMJ-TV currently broadcasts 34 hours of locally produced newscasts each week (with 5 1/2 hours each weekday, 3 1/2 hours on Saturdays and three hours on Sundays). WTMJ's newscast ratings had generally finished first place among the market's television news outlets for most of the 1990s and early 2000s. Since the 2010s, WITI, WISN and WTMJ have competed and finished first in selected ratings periods.

WTMJ-TV maintains a news and weather content agreement with sister radio stations WTMJ and WKTI (the former WLWK-FM). Until the newspaper and television station were separated in the split of Journal Communications' properties into Scripps and Journal Media Group in 2015 (and the year-later purchase of the Journal Sentinel by Gannett), the station also partnered with the Milwaukee Journal Sentinel to provide news stories and weather forecasts seen in the newspaper; WTMJ-TV maintained an auxiliary studio in the Journal Sentinel's State Street headquarters for a regular segment on its now-defunct 3 p.m. newscast called "JSOnAir". The station, along with WTMJ radio currently maintains a content agreement with the Milwaukee Business Journal for reporting of business-related stories, with the television side partnering with the paper as of April 18, 2017, after waiting out an existing television partnership with Fox affiliate WITI which previously precluded an immediate partnership. With the end of the 2016-17 academic year, the station's final link with the Journal Sentinel was severed with the cancellation of Preps Plus, a Sunday night high school athletics "week in review" show produced by the newspaper for 25 years based on their coverage banner of the same name, in favor of WTMJ's own Friday night high school sports rundown, Friday Night Frenzy.

WTMJ-TV was formerly a partner with Time Warner Cable in offering their original programming and news on a delayed basis through video on demand before those features were discontinued with changes in that provider's strategy after the merger into Spectrum, and Scripps offering their own apps on mobile devices and digital media players to carry that content.

After Today expanded to four hours in September 2007, WTMJ began shifting its programming focus very heavily towards local news, as replacement syndicated programming for Martha, Wheel of Fortune and Jeopardy! after all three programs moved to other area stations, and Montel's August 2008 departure from syndication failed to spark viewer interest outside of local/network hours. On August 25, 2008, after Extra moved to WITI, the station expanded its 6 p.m. newscast to one hour (although it reverted to a half-hour on Tuesday nights during the NFL season due to Mike McCarthy's coaches show in the past); this was followed on September 8 by the debut of an hour-long newscast at 3 p.m., which featured segments including "Ask the Experts", an interactive "sound off" segment incorporating viewer calls and social media contributions, and a "hot topics" section which features WTMJ radio afternoon host Jeff Wagner among the regular panelists. Green Bay sister station WGBA-TV added simulcasts of WTMJ's morning and noon newscasts on July 14, 2008, with WGBA producing local weather inserts using its own meteorologists in place of the WTMJ-produced weather segments. The simulcast ended in early 2009, due to viewer disinterest in Milwaukee-focused news (WGBA relaunched a local morning newscast in January 2011). WTMJ also began to produce forecasts for WGBA to air during its weekend newscasts. Until April 2013, when Larry McCarren became WGBA's sports director, all sports segments on WGBA were produced by WTMJ.

On April 7, 2009, WTMJ became the first television station in Milwaukee and the second in Wisconsin (behind CBS affiliate WISC-TV in Madison) to begin broadcasting its local newscasts and other local programming in high definition. With the conversion, a new music package (High Velocity by 615 Music) and graphics from Renderon Broadcast Design (the main graphics company for all Journal Broadcast Group stations, which has also developed Scripps' standardized graphics packages since 2008) was introduced. Segments broadcast from the main studio and news video from the field are presented in the format, as with most of the station's live units and skycam system. The rest of the station's skycams are equipped for digital widescreen and upconverted for HD broadcast in WTMJ's production control room. On August 13, 2012, WTMJ moved all newscasts from Studio A to a temporary set in Studio D to make way for the construction of a new set; the new main news set in Studio A was launched on September 9, 2012, during the 5 p.m. newscast.

The station dropped its 6:30 p.m. newscast on April 11, 2011, replacing it with Access Hollywood (which previously aired on WTMJ from its September 1995 debut until it moved Late Night to its network-mandated 11:35 p.m. slot in 2000; Access moved to WTMJ after WISN expanded its 10 p.m. newscast to one hour in January 2011, the consequence of this being WISN moving the newsmagazine from its longtime 10:30 p.m. slot to 12:30 a.m. and NBCUniversal Television Distribution asking for an early release from its contract in order to move to WTMJ). On February 4, 2013, the station debuted the locally produced newsmagazine Wisconsin Tonight in the 6:30 p.m. timeslot (which airs on digital channel 4.2 twice a week during Packers season due to its broadcasts of Packers Live on Mondays and the Packers coach's show on Tuesdays; Access Hollywood moved to 1:35 a.m., before it moved to WITI on September 8, 2014, in an 11:35 p.m. slot; its companion talk show Access Hollywood Live was restored by WTMJ in the 2 p.m. slot on September 15, 2014). In October 2014, WGBA debuted its own version of Wisconsin Tonight that incorporates some content from WTMJ, airing on nights when it does not air Packers-related programming. On January 20, 2014, WTMJ officially expanded the weekday editions of Live at Daybreak (now known as TMJ4 News Today) to 4:30 a.m., becoming the last of the market's four television news outlets to expand their morning newscasts to the slot; it had effectively begun to do so two weeks earlier due to that month's record cold temperatures requiring early coverage of school and business closings. On January 21, 2016, Wisconsin Tonight was replaced with Scripps' station-wide concept The Now. It switched from the final Journal-instituted graphics package to the then-current Scripps corporate package on May 5, 2016, again switching the current Scripps package in early March 2020. A month earlier, longtime anchor Carole Meekins had resigned her 10 p.m. weeknight anchor duties to focus on a new Sunday morning program featuring positive news stories, Positively Milwaukee, an effort which grew out of a segment hosted by former anchor Bill Taylor in the 1990s.

The 3 p.m. newscast ended on September 11, 2015, and was replaced the following Monday (September 14) by the freshman syndicated lifestyle talk show FABLife (which only lasted one season); the replacement of the newscast with syndicated programming was planned before the Scripps acquisition was announced. On September 19, the Saturday morning newscast was moved to 5–7 a.m. (having previously aired from 8 to 10 a.m. after Today, which it aired live at 6 a.m.); the Sunday morning newscast was also moved to 5–7 a.m. and Meet the Press is aired live from NBC's Eastern Time Zone feed rather than on a one-hour tape delay as the station has done for years and to allow better scheduling flow to allow the station to meet educational programming quotas (through NBC's children's program block) on weekends when heavy sports preemptions occur, as well as to allow Packers Today to air in the hour before the network pre-game shows during the NFL season. Before the aforementioned reductions, Channel 4 was one of the few Big Three stations in the United States that had a weekly news programming total exceeding 40 hours (which is more common with news-producing affiliates of the post-1986 broadcast networks, such as Fox affiliate WITI locally).

The station was one of three Milwaukee television stations that operated a news helicopter. The helicopter, Chopper 4, was based at Lawrence J. Timmerman Airport. In June 2005, then-reporter Vince Vitrano was worried that he might miss the first pitch for a media-league softball game and was dropped off by Chopper 4. The helicopter was retired in December 2018 leaving WISN 12 Chopper as the last remaining news helicopter in Milwaukee and the entire state of Wisconsin.

On April 6, 2020, the 3 p.m. newscast made a temporary return to WTMJ's schedule, with Kelly Clarkson being moved back an hour to 2 p.m. and The List being placed on hiatus in favor of the Scripps national program Coronavirus: The Rundown (RightThisMinute airs a second episode before the late-night repeat of Kelly; the show's new daily episode has pushed to that timeslot), in order to report local developments related to the COVID-19 pandemic; the 4 p.m. newscast was regularly preempted since mid-March by a combination of the city/county of Milwaukee's daily combined coronavirus teleconference and the White House Coronavirus Task Force briefing (the former has now shifted to a 2 p.m. Tuesday/Thursday schedule). During the pandemic, Days of Our Lives de facto regularly aired split into two portions on the station, with the state of Wisconsin's teleconference occurring during the soap. As of mid-June 2020, the 3 p.m. newscast shifted to 3:30 p.m. with the return of The List to regular production, then was discontinued as of April 2, 2021, returning the station's afternoon schedule to its pre-March 2020 state.

== Technical information ==
=== Subchannels ===
The station's signal is multiplexed:

Subchannels of WTMJ-TV
Subchannel	Res.	Short name	Programming
4.1	1080i	WTMJ	NBC
4.2	480i	BOUNCE	Bounce TV
4.3	480i	GRIT	Grit
4.4	480i	LAFF	Laff
4.5	480i	MYSTERY	Ion Mystery
4.6	480i	QVC2	QVC2
4.7	480i	ShopLC	Shop LC
4.8	480i	ONTV4U	OnTV4U

On June 15, 2015, WTMJ added a second audio program (SAP) feed to its main channel to allow the transmission of Descriptive Video Service audio description and Spanish-language translations for NBC network programs; it became the last major network affiliate in the market to incorporate an SAP feed before the FCC's expansion of its requirements for television stations to feature audio description to media markets outside of the 25 largest (including Milwaukee) on July 1.

=== Analog-to-digital conversion ===
WTMJ-TV shut down its analog signal, over VHF channel 4, at noon on June 12, 2009, the official date on which full-power television stations in the United States transitioned from analog to digital broadcasts under federal mandate. The station's digital signal continued to broadcast on its pre-transition UHF channel 28, using virtual channel 4.
