= Watusi (dance) =

Solo dance

The Watusi, as advertised in a bar window.

The Watusi /wɑːtuːsi/ is a solo dance that enjoyed brief popularity during the early 1960s. It was one of the most popular dance crazes of the 1960s in the United States. "Watusi" is a former name for the Tutsi people of Africa, whose traditions include spectacular dances. The naming of the American dance may have been inspired, in particular, by a scene in the 1950 film King Solomon's Mines which featured Tutsi dancers, or by its sequel Watusi.

== History ==
The Orlons, a vocal quartet from Philadelphia, had the biggest hit of their career as recording artists with their recording of "The Wah-Watusi" (Cameo 218), which debuted on the Billboard Hot 100 singles chart on June 9, 1962, and remained on the Hot 100 for 14 weeks; it peaked at #2 and held the position for two weeks. On the R&B chart, the single peaked at #5.

This was not the only version of the song to hit the charts. On January 18, 1963, Chubby Checker released his single version of "The Wah-Watusi" (B-side of Cameo 221). Later that year, Smokey Robinson and the Miracles also recorded their own version. Popular covers of the song included those by Annette Funicello and The Isley Brothers. The Vibrations had previously released an R&B single in 1961 called "The Watusi" (US #25).

Also in 1963, Puerto Rican jazz musician Ray Barretto had his first hit with a song called "El Watusi", and—although he didn't invent the dancing style—he came to be typecast as connected to the style. Barretto's recording, "El Watusi" (Tico 419), debuted on the Billboard Hot 100 singles chart on April 27, 1963, and remained on the Hot 100 for 9 weeks; it peaked at #17 for 9 weeks. The Ventures covered Barretto's version on their 1965 album Let's Go!.

The "Monkey Watusi" is mentioned in the 1964 single "Hey Harmonica Man" by Stevie Wonder. "The Watusi", along with "The Twist", is mentioned in the fragmentary "lyrics" of the Beatles' sound collage "Revolution 9". "The Watusi" is also mentioned in Chris Kenner's song "Land of 1000 Dances". The Watusi is also mentioned in Sam Cooke's 1962 hit "Twistin' the Night Away," where it appears as one of several dances called out during the song's instrumental break.

"The Watusi" was one of the inspirations for the Exodus song "The Toxic Waltz", from their 1989 album Fabulous Disaster.

The "Watusi" is also mentioned in a song by The Go-Go's titled "We Got The Beat".

The dance was central to "We Love You Miss Pringle", the 26th episode of the second season of My Favorite Martian which first aired March 28, 1965. It was also referenced in the 1967 movie "Guess Who's Coming to Dinner" in a light-hearted conversation, between Matt Drayton and John Prentice, about black teenagers dancing. It was also referenced in the 33rd episode of the first season of The Addams Family, "Lurch the Teenage Idol", first aired May 21, 1965.

== See also ==
- The Batusi, a dance named by analogy to the Watusi
