= WCGV-TV =

Television station in Milwaukee (1980–2018)

- Milwaukee, Wisconsin; United States
- Channels: Digital: 25 (UHF); Virtual: 24
- Branding: My24

Programming
- Affiliations: Independent (1980–1987, 1994–1995, January–August 1998); Fox (1987–1994); UPN (1995–January 1998, August 1998–2006); MyNetworkTV (2006–2018); Fox Kids/Fox Box (secondary, 1994–2004)

Ownership
- Owner: Sinclair Broadcast Group; (WCGV Licensee, LLC)

History
- First air date: March 24, 1980
- Last air date: January 8, 2018
- Former channel number: Analog: 24 (UHF, 1980–2009)
- Call sign meaning: "Wisconsin's Choice for Great Viewing"

Technical information
- Facility ID: 71278
- ERP: 1,000 kW
- HAAT: 340.3 m (1,116 ft)
- Transmitter coordinates: 43°5′46.2″N 87°54′15″W

WCGV-TV (channel 24) was a television station in Milwaukee, Wisconsin, United States, which operated from 1980 to 2018. It was last owned by Sinclair Broadcast Group, alongside CW affiliate WVTV (channel 18), and affiliated with MyNetworkTV. WCGV-TV's operations were last housed at WVTV's studio facilities on Milwaukee's northwest side; the station's transmitter was located in Estabrook Park.

The construction permit for channel 24 was issued to a group headed by Robert S. Block and Marvin Fishman, who sought to develop a subscription television service for Milwaukee. WCGV-TV began broadcasting on March 24, 1980, and three months later began offering subscription service from SelecTV, in which Block held an ownership interest. Both halves of the operation were eventually business failures. The original daytime programming, anchored by a two-hour live talk show, failed to attract ratings and lost money; because the station was broadcasting SelecTV in the evenings, many confused viewers believed it to be an all-pay station. The subscription operation, which at its height had 30,000 subscribers, soon failed amid competition from video rentals and closed altogether in July 1984.

The end of SelecTV as well as two changes in ownership freed WCGV to become a competitive alternative to WVTV, Milwaukee's heritage independent station. WCGV affiliated with Fox in 1987 and secured the rights to Milwaukee Brewers baseball and Milwaukee Bucks basketball games, which had aired on WVTV, the next year. Fox programming and sports brought new audiences to the station. In 1993, ABRY Communications took over operations of WVTV under a local marketing agreement, starting a relationship that persisted for the rest of channel 24's existence; sports telecasts moved to WVTV as Fox became a seven-night-a-week network.

Sinclair Broadcast Group acquired WCGV-TV in 1994. When Fox moved its affiliation in a national realignment to WITI (channel 6), the previous CBS affiliate, Sinclair steadfastly refused to affiliate WCGV-TV with CBS and instead affiliated channel 24 with UPN. In the late 1990s, WCGV became the broadcast home of the Brewers and Bucks, serving in those capacities through 2003 and 2007, respectively. Except for a seven-month period in 1998 when WCGV dropped UPN during a corporate dispute, channel 24 broadcast the network until its merger with The WB in 2006 and aligned with MyNetworkTV. On January 8, 2018, WCGV-TV's broadcast license was surrendered after Sinclair sold the station's spectrum in the 2016 Federal Communications Commission (FCC) incentive auction. At that time, the station's programming continued as subchannels of WVTV, continuing to use major virtual channel 24. What was WCGV-TV's primary subchannel continues under the WVTV license as My24.

== Prior history of channel 24 ==
Though WCGV was the first Milwaukee station to broadcast on channel 24, it was not the first construction permit in force to use the channel. In 1958, the Federal Communications Commission (FCC) shifted the ultra high frequency (UHF) television assignments for the city from channels 19, 25, and 31 to channels 18, 24, and 30. Milwaukee's failed WCAN-TV, which had operated on channel 25, still had a valid permit which was changed to specify the new channel. Lou Poller sold the permit in 1966 to Field Communications, which had just put WFLD on the air in Chicago and had previously applied for a completely new construction permit for Milwaukee. Field sought to rezone a parcel in Mequon to house a new 999-foot (304 m) tower and studio; the station would serve as a part-time rebroadcaster of WFLD to originate up to 25 percent of its own programs. Field announced it would dispose of the permit in 1969, when it announced its intention to sell WFLD to Metromedia.

== Construction and early years ==
In 1972, Robert S. Block and Marvin Fishman incorporated B & F Broadcasting, Inc., to file for and pursue the development of a new channel 24 TV station in Milwaukee. Block owned an advertising business, while Fishman was a former vice chairman of the Milwaukee Bucks basketball team and had previously attempted to purchase the Chicago Bulls. The corresponding application was filed with the FCC on March 13, 1973, and granted on June 13.

Block and Fishman's primary interest in the construction of channel 24 was to offer broadcast subscription television (STV) programs. At the same time the FCC granted a construction permit, B & F was granted authority for STV broadcasting, the third such authorization made by the commission in under a year. The new station would use a system from Teleglobe Inc., which was licensed to the Block-owned firm Telease. Milwaukee's Kohl family invested $30 million in Telease, and in 1974 a startup in 1975 was announced for what would at that time have been the only STV station in the nation. However, the concept of pay television produced substantial friction with Milwaukee civic leaders. One alderman wrote to the FCC asking it to reconsider, saying that the advent of an STV station could hamstring proposals for cable television in the city. When the permit was issued, Block and Fishman intended to lease city-owned land near Capitol Drive and the Milwaukee River for a tower site, but the city stalled, leading to an agreement to buy the former Sealtest Foods site on Capitol Drive. In May 1975, a building permit for the tower was issued, and the station was said to debut in 1976.

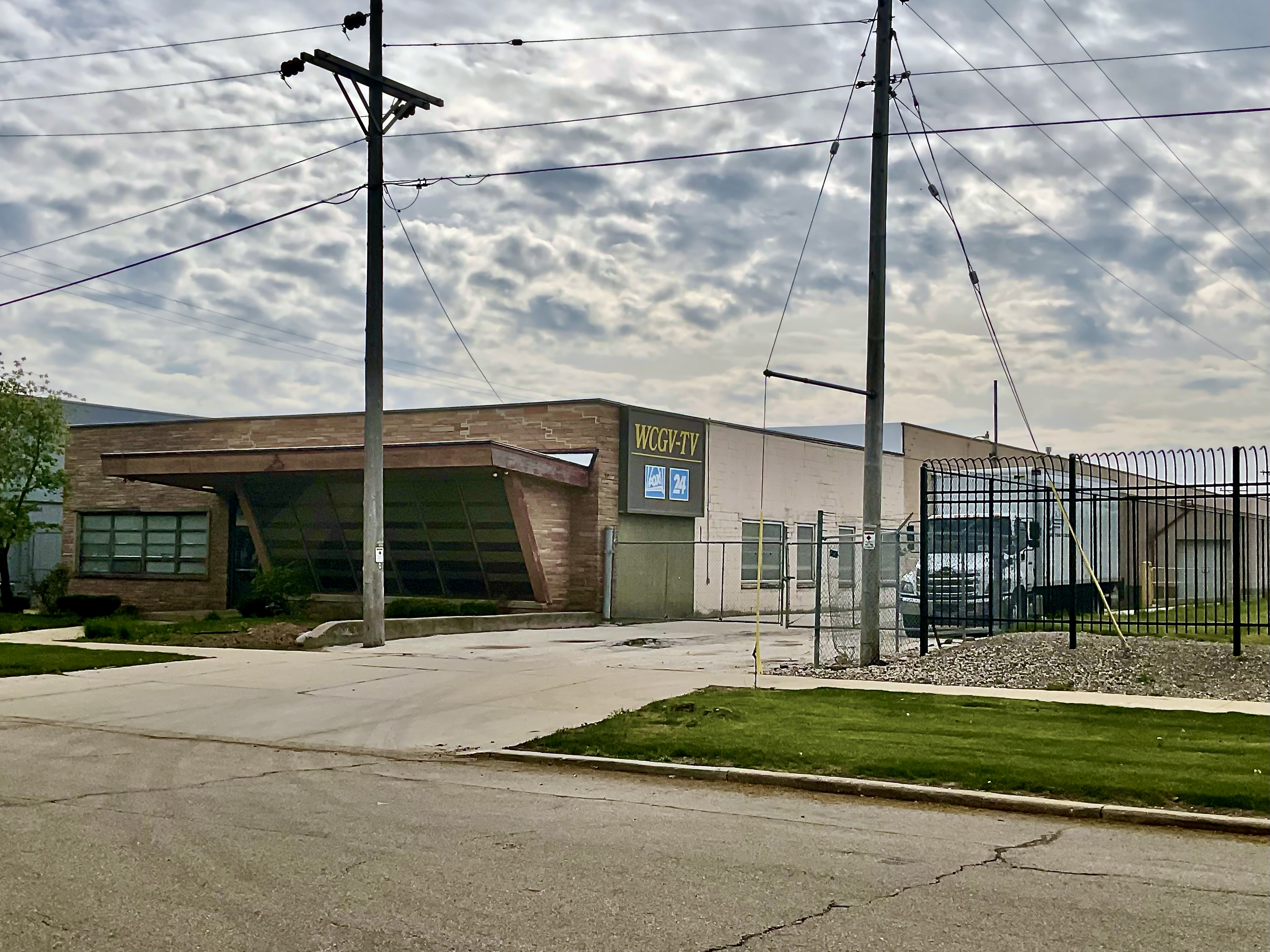
WCGV-TV operated from this building on 27th Street, previously used by WITI, from its launch in 1980 until consolidating with WVTV in 1993. The WCGV sign was still on the building in 2023.

That same year, Robert S. Block Advertising lost its largest account, the grocery store chain A&P, which accounted for 90 percent of its revenues. This was a substantial setback to the development of channel 24, and development of Block's STV businesses shifted to Los Angeles. In 1978, B & F moved to put channel 24 back on track by buying the former studio building of WITI (channel 6), which was moving out of its existing site on 27th Street and to new quarters in Brown Deer. By then, a transmitter had been ordered, and foundations had been poured for the tower at the Sealtest site. Dick Weis, a Milwaukee broadcaster with radio and television experience, was hired as general manager.

WCGV-TV ("Wisconsin's Choice for Great Viewing") began broadcasting a test pattern on March 5, 1980. Full regular daytime programming began on March 24 with religious programs and old movies. On April 14, the centerpiece of WCGV's daytime lineup debuted: a two-hour local talk and variety show, Tempo 24. The intention was that religious programs and STV revenues would bring in enough revenue to sustain the program, hosted by B. J. Rabb and Joe Thompson. Rabb had worked at WEMP and WBCS-FM and was an announcer for WTMJ-TV (channel 4), while Thompson was a weekend sportscaster at WITI. Tempo 24 featured in-studio guests, phone calls from viewers, and news updates. Other local programs in WCGV's first year included the local music program Cream City and a weekly Spanish-language show, Espectacular '80.

Subscription television operations commenced on June 27 with the debut of programming by SelecTV of Wisconsin. Viewers were charged $19.95 a month for service and $49.95 for the installation of the necessary decoder. At launch, SelecTV offered two evening movies and a daily matinee film as well as a separate tier of late-night adult films. By this time, SelecTV had been reorganized and Block was no longer an active partner. Among SelecTV's local attractions was a package of Milwaukee Brewers baseball games, with a 13-game contract for 1981.

While WCGV's early evening block of Chico and the Man, Get Smart and Bonanza proved competitive in the ratings, Tempo 24 was flagging. Despite being extended with the October launch of Tempo Early Edition, Tempo was canceled on November 26. The station was losing money, owing to high debt service costs and a soft advertising market; entire departments were shuttered and the station's staff of 58 trimmed to 17; and it began subleasing studio space. The hybrid format of ad-supported and subscription broadcasting engendered confusion among viewers, many of whom thought the station offered no free-to-air programs; at one point in 1982, B & F considered discontinuing all ad-supported programming. That June, SelecTV had 30,000 subscribers locally; figures peaked at 36,000.

The cost cuts showed up in changes to channel 24's programming. Beginning February 1, 1982, WCGV began devoting four hours of its daytime schedule to the new Financial News Network. Among the odder programs channel 24 aired was Bozo's Breakfast Club, nominally a franchise of the Bozo the Clown children's program. However, Breakfast Club differed in many respects. The half-hour was leased by the cash-strapped station to Frank Carmichael, whose brother Kurt played Bozo and ran a risque version of the show with double entendre jokes such as "van-aerial disease" and segments such as "Bozo's Butt-Burner", in which, per Mike Drew of The Milwaukee Journal, "the clown points his bottom at the camera and presses his finger to it, making a sizzling sound". The program was canceled due to low ratings and complaints from parents. With the cancellation of Bozo, the only locally produced show on channel 24's air was the music video series Television Music Machine. At one point during the year, WCGV had no advertising sales representatives, and its general manager George Drymalski later claimed that if things had not turned around, the station was at risk of being shut down. In August 1983, Byron Lasky bought a majority stake in B & F Broadcasting and incorporated the station into his Arlington Broadcast Group.

Meanwhile, SelecTV began to experience financial issues. By March 1983, its subscriber count had dropped to an estimated 24,600; it dropped 14 hours a week of programming by discontinuing the weekday afternoon matinees and cutting back on weekend afternoon broadcasting, ceding time to WCGV for expanded commercial broadcasting. SelecTV also entered into a dispute with WCGV over the censorship of select adult films; the station believed it needed to act to protect its broadcast license, while SelecTV contended that the program service had enough restrictions to prevent unwanted viewing. About 80 percent of subscribers took the adult package. SelecTV was down to 17,000 subscribers by April 1984 as video rentals became more commonplace, WCGV began stockpiling syndicated programming in anticipation of becoming a full-time, ad-supported commercial independent station—a transition two of the three other Arlington stations, KNXV-TV in Phoenix and WQTV in Boston, had already undergone. SelecTV's last broadcast was July 7, 1984, and WCGV became a full-time independent on July 8. In a prepared statement, SelecTV declared that it never turned a profit in Milwaukee.

== Challenging WVTV ==
Without SelecTV occupying prime time, WCGV filled the time with movies and syndicated shows, including Dallas. It also aired the CBS Late Night block, which WITI preempted. In its first ratings survey after the closure of SelecTV, WCGV was only slightly off the audience share of Milwaukee's heritage independent, WVTV (channel 18), tying or coming in a close second (depending on the survey) in prime time and total-day ratings. By 1985, WCGV was airing twice as many movies a week as WVTV. The station became profitable for the first time in the fourth quarter of 1985, and in May 1986, WCGV and the fourth Arlington station—WTTO in Birmingham, Alabama—were sold together to HR Broadcasting. HR was a firm minority-owned by Hal Roach Studios and run by former Metromedia TV stations president Albert Krivin.

In October 1986, the Fox network debuted with its only offering being a late-night talk show, The Late Show Starring Joan Rivers. For reasons relating to late-night scheduling, WVTV and WCGV both passed on Fox. WVTV was airing The Tonight Show Starring Johnny Carson, which NBC affiliate WTMJ-TV did not clear, and WCGV—which aired The Bob Newhart Show opposite Carson and beat it soundly in the ratings—was unsuccessful in getting permission from Fox to air Rivers in daytime. By March 1987, Milwaukee was the largest market in the country without a Fox affiliate, as the network prepared to launch its first night of prime time programming. Though Fox had initially insisted on The Late Show being aired by any affiliate, it ultimately relented and affiliated with WCGV in time for the April 5 launch of Fox Sunday night, permitting the station to not air Rivers for the time being. (Note: The Late Show did not debut on WCGV until September 5, 1988, by which time it was hosted by Ross Shafer. It was canceled the next month.) It chose WCGV over WVTV because of channel 18's heavy sports carriage, which often forced program preemptions.

As early as 1985, WCGV showed interest in the rights to Brewers baseball and Bucks basketball that were held by WVTV. However, that year it lost out on three-year contracts for both teams, which were awarded to WVTV; channel 24's bid prompted a 50 percent increase in rights fees for the Bucks in the final contract. The two teams, which negotiated their rights together, awarded three-year contracts to WCGV for 30 Bucks and 60 Brewers road games beginning in 1988–89 for the Bucks and 1989 for the Brewers, ending years of coverage by WVTV. An advertisement for WCGV replaced that of WTMJ-TV on the scoreboard at Milwaukee County Stadium, and WCGV became the number-one station in overnight prime time ratings for the first time ever with a Brewers telecast in August. With the Brewers and Bucks, an upturn in Fox's fortunes with such hits as The Simpsons, and the popularity of the syndicated The Arsenio Hall Show, WCGV had become stronger, and WVTV was no longer Milwaukee's "boss independent".

=== ABRY ownership and Sinclair acquisition ===
Hal Roach Studios merged in 1988 with Robert Halmi Inc. in a deal orchestrated by Qintex Limited, an Australian broadcasting and business conglomerate, to form Qintex Entertainment Inc. This company came under financial pressure the next year as a result of its Australian parent's financial troubles and filed for bankruptcy reorganization in October 1989. Qintex Entertainment's assets were sold to satisfy the company's debts, with the two television stations including WCGV sold to ABRY Communications. ABRY, a firm owned by Andrew Banks and Royce Yudkoff, were the highest bidders at auction for the stations, paying $40 million, with proceeds split between HR Broadcasting's other investors and Qintex. After the ABRY purchase, the station signed a one-year extension with the Bucks for 1991–92 and a three-year renewal with the Brewers, both times beating out WVTV.

In January 1993, ABRY entered into a local marketing agreement (LMA) with WVTV and its owner, Gaylord Broadcasting, to provide administrative services to channel 18 in exchange for an option to buy the station if the FCC ever legalized duopolies. Simultaneously, WCGV's Brewers rights moved to WVTV in order to clear more time for Fox network programming, which was expanding to a full seven nights a week; the Bucks followed suit for the following season. WVTV's general manager, Michael Schuch, was named to head the combination, while WVTV's 9 p.m. newscast was discontinued, in part because it would have been preempted by sports telecasts. When WITI passed on the Late Show with David Letterman, a new CBS late-night talk show, WCGV began airing the program in Milwaukee. CBS rejected an offer from WDJT-TV (channel 58) to air the program live and placed it on a delay on WCGV.

Sinclair Broadcast Group agreed to acquire WCGV and WTTO from ABRY in August 1993. The $80 million purchase price doubled what ABRY had paid for the pair in 1990. In parallel, a company with close Sinclair ties tried to buy WVTV. ABRY had agreed at the same time to assign its option to buy WVTV to Edwin Edwards, owner of WPTT in Pittsburgh. Edwards's acquisition of that station had been financed by Sinclair, and Sinclair's WPGH-TV there programmed it. Also included in the transaction to Glencairn, Inc., was Baltimore's WNUV-TV. The WVTV transaction was withdrawn in April 1994 after a complaint over the WNUV sale, but after Sinclair assumed control, it agreed to assign the option to Edwards.

== Loss of Fox and affiliation with UPN ==
On May 23, 1994, Fox announced an agreement with New World Communications in which most of New World's stations would become affiliates of that network. Among those due to switch affiliations was Milwaukee's WITI, leaving WCGV without a network affiliation. The deal, which triggered a years-long realignment process in cities nationwide, left CBS needing a new affiliate in the Milwaukee market. It approached NBC affiliate WTMJ-TV and ABC affiliate WISN-TV (channel 12), but each renewed their existing contracts. This left three commercial independent or soon-to-be-independent stations operating in Milwaukee as potential CBS affiliates: WVTV, WCGV-TV (about to lose Fox), and WDJT-TV.

Sinclair president David D. Smith, however, was consistently uninterested in affiliating WCGV with CBS. CBS had an hourlong conversation with Sinclair representatives in early June, but Smith repeatedly stated his lack of interest then and again in October. Managers at the station and outside observers such as WDJT-TV general manager Neal Shapiro cited various reasons for this, including a desire to control the station's programming more than would be possible with CBS affiliation and a mismatch between CBS's older viewers and the younger viewers that WVTV and WCGV attracted. The new management also dropped the Late Show, which moved to WDJT. Instead, Sinclair moved forward with affiliating WCGV with the new United Paramount Network (UPN). Since that network did not launch until January 1995, WCGV was briefly an independent airing movies in prime time. Fox Kids programming did not move to WITI and remained on WCGV.

Sinclair's relationship with UPN deteriorated after an action that benefited UPN's direct competitor, The WB. On July 21, 1997, Sinclair signed a long-term affiliation agreement with The WB, under which the group committed five of its UPN-affiliated stations to that network in 1998, with a sixth independent station to join in 1999. The high-profile move by Sinclair led to a legal dispute between the companies. UPN sued Sinclair, alleging it had breached its affiliation contract by exiting it early. WCGV was not included in this action, as WVTV was the WB affiliate. In December 1997, Sinclair formally notified UPN that it would not renew affiliations at four additional stations, including WCGV, when they expired on January 16, 1998. Instead, WCGV became an independent, and WVTV's rights to 50 Brewers telecasts moved over to channel 24 to reduce WB program preemptions. In August, the parties settled the litigation in an agreement that restored the UPN affiliation of WCGV. Despite the return of a network, WCGV continued with the Brewers and also became the new home of 35 Bucks games a season. In 2001, WCGV decided to carry only 38 Brewers games instead of 50, with the remainder being aired by WISN-TV; this arrangement ran through 2003, after which the Brewers moved all telecasts to cable.

WCGV-TV began broadcasting a digital signal on channel 25 on March 21, 2003. Dual analog and digital service continued until February 17, 2009, the originally intended digital transition date, at which time the analog signal ceased airing programming and digital service continued on channel 25, using major virtual channel 24.

== MyNetworkTV era ==
On January 24, 2006, Time Warner and CBS Corporation announced that The WB and UPN would merge their higher-rated programs onto a new network, The CW. The news of the merger resulted in Sinclair announcing, two months later, that most of its UPN and WB affiliates, including WCGV, would join MyNetworkTV, a new service formed by News Corporation, which also owned the Fox network. Sinclair only affiliated with The CW for eight stations, including WVTV, in May and was among the last major groups to do so. Beginning in 2007, the Bucks became cable-only, leaving WCGV to air all local games on FSN North.

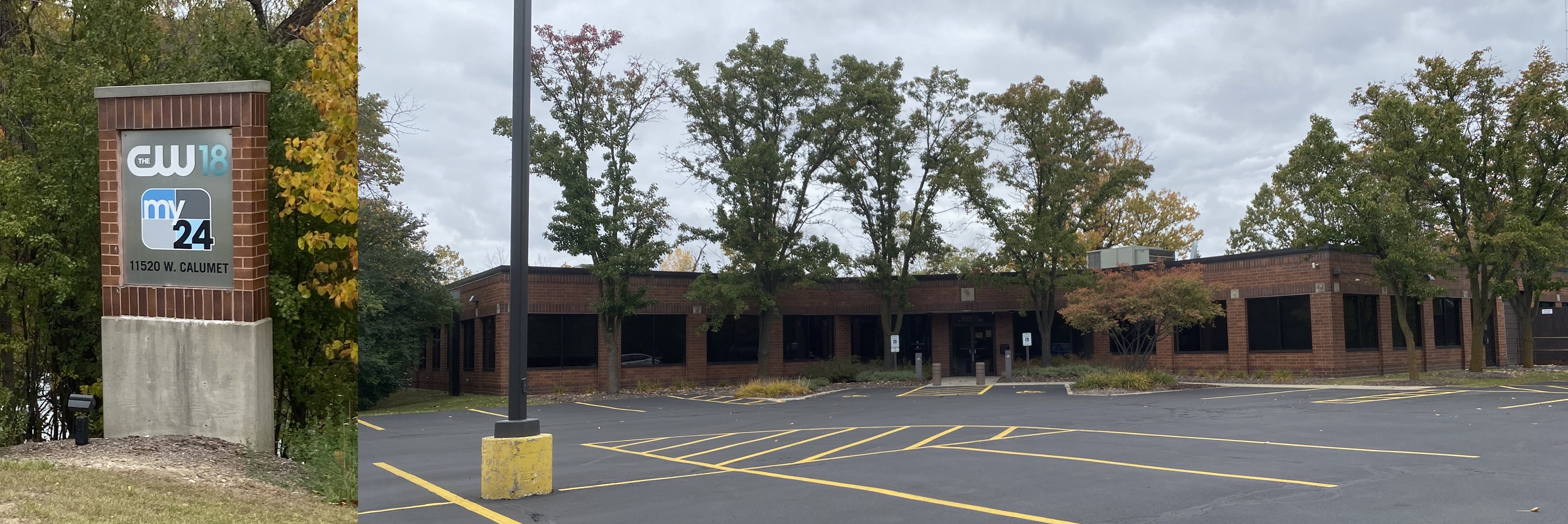
The WVTV–WCGV studio building, as seen in 2022. The stations' operations moved here in 2013.

Floods damaged the 35th Street studios that housed WVTV–WCGV in 2009 and 2010. In 2013, WVTV and WCGV moved to a site at 115th Street and Calumet Road, on the far northwest side of Milwaukee.

=== Spectrum sale ===
On April 13, 2017, it was revealed that Sinclair sold the spectrum underlying WCGV-TV for $84.3 million in the broadcast incentive auction held by the FCC to free up frequencies for wireless communications services. WCGV was one of four stations that sold its spectrum. On January 8, 2018, the necessary changes were made, requiring viewers to rescan to continue watching My24, which was now provided as a subchannel of WVTV (still using major channel 24).

Sinclair had originally intended to keep both stations' broadcast licenses with a channel-sharing agreement to broadcast them from one multiplex. It instead decided to surrender WCGV-TV's broadcast license after the rescan date. At the time, Sinclair was attempting to acquire Tribune Media, owner of WITI, and it would not have been able to hold three licenses in the Milwaukee market.

== Subchannels ==
WCGV-TV's transmitter was located near Estabrook Park. Ahead of its closure, WCGV broadcast three subchannels. My24 and Comet were carried over to WVTV, but Grit was not.

Subchannels of WCGV-TV as of June 2017
Subchannel	Res.	Short name	Programming
24.1	720p	My 24	MyNetworkTV
24.2	480i	COMET	Comet
24.3	480i	GRIT TV	Grit
