= Dance crazes =

Humorous dances enjoying bursts of popularity

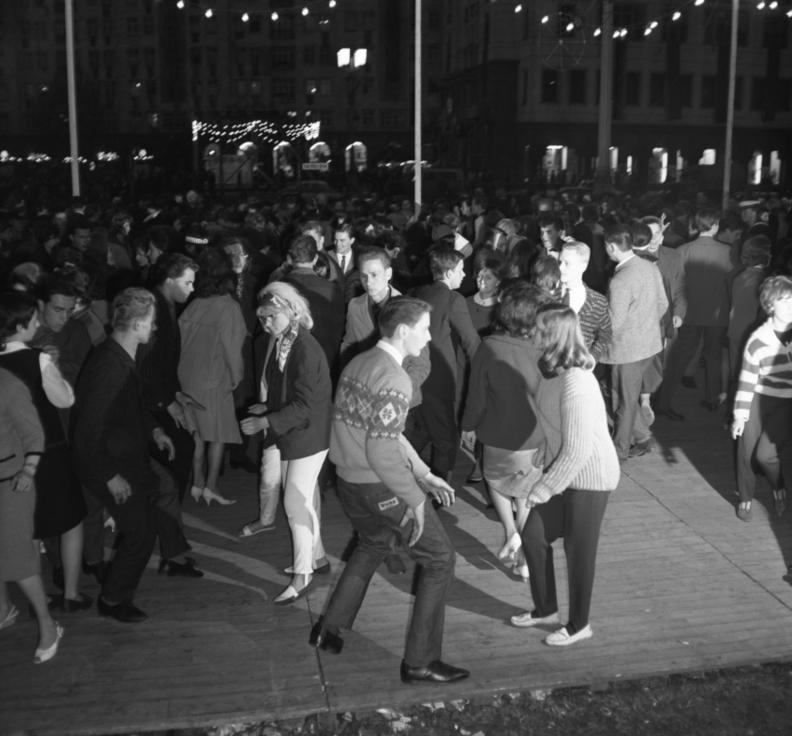
Dancing Twist, East Berlin, 17 May 1964

Novelty and fad dances are dances which are typically characterized by a short burst of popularity. Some of them, like the Twist, Y.M.C.A. and the Hokey Pokey, have shown much longer-lasting popularity. They are also called dance fads or dance crazes.

== Fad dances ==
As the pop music market exploded in the late 1950s, dance fads were commercialized and exploited. From the 1950s to the 1970s, new dance fads appeared almost every week. Many were popularized (or commercialized) versions of new styles or steps created by African-American dancers who frequented the clubs and discothèques in major U.S. cities like New York, Philadelphia and Detroit. Among these were the Madison, "The Swim", the "Mashed Potato", "The Twist", "The Frug" (pronounced /frʊɡ/), "The Watusi", "The Shake" and "The Hitch hike". Many 1950s and 1960s dance crazes had animal names, including "The Chicken" (not to be confused with the Chicken Dance), "The Pony" and "The Dog".

In 1965, Latin group Cannibal and the Headhunters had a hit with the 1962 Chris Kenner song "Land of a Thousand Dances" which included the names of such dances. One list of Fad Dances compiled in 1971 named over ninety dances. Standardized versions of dance moves were published in dance and teen magazines, often choreographed to popular songs. Songs such as "The Loco-Motion" were specifically written with the intention of creating a new dance and many more pop hits, such as "Mashed Potato Time" by Dee Dee Sharp, were written to cash in recent successful novelties.

In the early 1970s, disco spawned a succession of dance fads including the Bump, the Hustle, and the Y.M.C.A. This continued in the 1980s with the popular song "Walk like an Egyptian", in the 1990s with "Achy Breaky Heart", "The Electric Slide", and the "Macarena", in the 2000s with "The Ketchup Song" and the "Cha Cha Slide" and in the 2010s with "Gangnam Style". Contemporary sources for dance crazes include music videos and movies.

There are fad dances which are meant to be danced individually as solo, others are partner dances, and yet others are danced in groups. Some of them were of freestyle type, i.e., there were no particular step patterns and they were distinguished by the style of the dance movement (Twist, Shake, Swim, Pony, Hitch hike). Only some have remained to the modern day-era, sometimes only as the name of a step (Suzie Q, Shimmy) or of a style (Mashed Potato) in a recognized dance. Fad dances are in fashion at the time of their popularity. They come to be associated with a specific time period, and can evoke particular forms of nostalgia when revived.

== Notable novelty and fad dances ==
=== Pre-1950s ===
Year	Dance
1909	The Grizzly Bear
1926	Charleston
1930s	Duckwalk
1933	Carioca
1936	Suzie Q
1937	The Lambeth Walk
1940	Thunder Clap
1941	Conga
mid-1940s	Hokey Pokey

=== 1950s ===
Year	Dance
1950s	The Chicken
1952	Bunny Hop
1957	Sock Hop
1958	Madison
1958	The Stroll
1959	Hully Gully

=== 1960s ===
Year	Dance
1960	Shimmy
1960	Twist
1961	The Chicken Walk
1961	The Pony
1962	The Loco-Motion
1962	Martian Hop
1962	Mashed Potato
1962	The Monster Mash
1962	The Swim
1962	Watusi
1962	Popeye Dance
1963	Hitch Hike
1963	Monkey
1963-1965	Letkajenkka (aka Letkajenka, Letkiss, Letka-Enka)
1964	The Frug
1964	Jerk
1965	The Freddie
1965	The Mouse
1965	Limbo
1966	Batusi
1966	The Shake

=== 1970s ===
Year	Dance
1970s	Sprinkler
1971	Penguin
1972	Hustle
1973	Time Warp
1975	Bump
1975	Tragedy
mid-1970s	Grinding
1976	Car Wash
1976	Electric Slide
1976	Robot
1977	The Running Man
1978	Y.M.C.A.

=== 1980s ===
Year	Dance
1980s	Moonwalk
1980s	Chicken Dance
1980	Cotton-Eyed Joe
1981	Harlem Shake
1981	Agadoo (aka Agadou)
1981	Superman (aka Gioca Jouer)
1982	The Safety
1983	Thriller
1986	The Hunch
1986	Wig Wam Bam
1987	Cabbage Patch
1988	Da Butt
1989	Lambada

=== 1990s ===
Years	Dance
1990s	Carlton dance (Alfonso Riberio)
1990	Hammertime (MC Hammer)
1990	The Humpty Dance (Digital Underground)
1990	Vogue (Madonna)
1991	The Stonk (Hale & Pace)
1991	The Urkel (Jaleel White)
1992	Achy Breaky (Line dance)
1994	Saturday Night (Whigfield)
1996	Tic, Tic Tac
1996	Macarena (Los Del Rio)
1998	La Bomba (not to be confused with Bomba)
1998	The Roger Rabbit

=== 2000s ===
Year	Dance
2000	Cha Cha Slide
2002	Algorithm March
2002	The Ketchup Song (Las Ketchup)
2003	Dutty Wine
2005	Caramelldansen
2006	Chicken Noodle Soup (Webstar)
2006	Daggering
2006	Laffy Taffy
2006	Lean wit It, Rock wit It (aka Snap dance)
2006	Shoulder Lean
2007	Crank That (Soulja Boy)
2007	Cupid Shuffle
2008	Single Ladies (Beyoncé)
2009	Jerkin' (brought to mainstream by New Boyz and Audio Push)
2009	Stanky Legg
2009	Hoedown Throwdown (Miley Cyrus)

=== 2010s ===
NASA staff performing the "Gangnam Style" dance at the Johnson Space Center in 2012

Year	Dance
2010	Dougie
2011	The Creep (The Lonely Island)
2011	Wobble (VIC)
2012	Gangnam Style (PSY)
2012	The Smurf
2013	Twerking
2013	Harlem shake
2015	Watch Me (Whip/Nae Nae)
2015	Hit Dem Folks
2016	Dab
2015	Hit the Quan
2016	Mannequin Challenge
2017	Shoot
2017	The Floss
2018	Kiki
2018	Skibidi (Little Big)
2019	Lottery/Renegade Dance (TikTok)

=== 2020s ===
Year	Dance
2021	Griddy
2023	Hot to Go! (Chappell Roan)

== See also ==
- Cover dance
- Outline of dance for a list of general dance topics.
- Summer hit
- List of specific dances for a general, noncategorized index of dances
