= Hi Diddle Riddle =

- Batman episode
- Episode no.: Season 1 Episode 1
- Directed by: Robert Butler
- Written by: Lorenzo Semple Jr.
- Production code: 6028-Pt. 1
- Original air date: January 12, 1966

Guest appearances
- Michael Fox; Jack Barry; Ben Astar, Damian O'Flynn; William Dozier, Jill St. John; Richard Reeves (uncredited); Special Guest Villain: Frank Gorshin as The Riddler

Episode chronology
← Previous —	Next → "Smack in the Middle"

"Hi Diddle Riddle" is the first half-hour length episode of Batman to air, first broadcast on ABC, Wednesday January 12, 1966 and repeated on August 24, 1966 and April 5, 1967. It marked the first appearance of Frank Gorshin as The Riddler.

== Plot synopsis ==
The series opens at the Republic of Moldavia exhibit, located at the Gotham City World's Fair, the Moldavian prime minister slices into the Moldavian friendship cake and unknowingly causes it to explode, releasing a concealed riddle. At the Gotham City Police Department, Police Commissioner James Gordon (Neil Hamilton) and Chief Miles O'Hara (Stafford Repp) suspect it to be the Riddler (Gorshin). They turn to Inspector Bash and all the other senior policemen, but all bow their heads for a moment of silence, they turn to a red phone ("I don't know who he is behind that mask of his, but I do know when we need him and we need him now!"). After a glimpse into the lives of Bruce Wayne (Adam West) and Dick Grayson (Burt Ward) as well as the opening credits, the riddle leads them as Batman and Robin to the Peale art gallery, where they catch the Riddler in the act of taking a cross from its proprietor Gideon Peale at gunpoint. They stop him with an explosive but learn to their horror that Riddler's gun was actually a lighter and the cross was his to begin with. Riddler whistles and some lawyers arrive bearing complaints in which the Riddler hands to Batman, who is slated to be sued for false arrest.

Batman and Robin must uncover the Riddler's plot before the case comes to trial or Batman will be forced to reveal his true identity in court, completely destroying his value as a crimefighter and stunting his career forever. However, Dick remembered that the Riddler said to look for two more riddles, and this clue inspires the Duo to get to the Batcave and closely examine the legal document.

Two hidden riddles in the legal documents lead Batman and Robin to the new "What a Way to Go-Go" discothèque. the Riddler informs the Mole Hill Mob that Batman has had time to solve his clue. As the Riddler and the Mole Hill Mob make their way through an underground corridor to the discothèque, his plan is again put into action. Being a minor, Robin is too young to enter the disco, so he waits outside in the Batmobile and monitors Batman on the Batscope while Batman dances the Batusi with the Riddler's assistant Molly (Jill St. John). However, his orange juice had been spiked with a sleeping pill. Watching from outside, Robin attempts to help Batman, but falls victim to the Riddler's tranquilizer gun. Riddler tries to steal the Batmobile but accidentally triggers its antitheft rockets. He then tries to destroy the car but the flames are extinguished by its "Bat-o-stat Antifire Activator". Robin is carried away down a manhole by the Riddler and the Mole Hill Mob. Batman finds himself in no condition to pursue them and is forced to surrender his keys to the police at the most inopportune time, especially since the Bat-Signal is being activated.

Meanwhile, at the Riddler's hideout, Robin is strapped to a table as the Riddler, who is surrounded by Molly and the Mole Hill Mob, attempts to operate on the unconscious boy.

Preceded by Series Premiere	Batman (TV series) episodes January 12, 1966	Succeeded by Smack in the Middle (airdate January 13, 1966)
