= The Penguin's a Jinx =

- Batman episode
- Episode no.: Season 1 Episode 4
- Directed by: Robert Butler
- Written by: Lorenzo Semple Jr.
- Production code: 8703-Pt. 2
- Original air date: January 20, 1966

Guest appearances
- David Lewis, Walter Burke, Lewis Charles, Robert Phillips, Alex D'Arcy, Johnny Jacobs, Leslie Parrish, Dan Tobi; Special Guest Villain: Burgess Meredith as The Penguin

Episode chronology
← Previous "Fine Feathered Finks"	Next → "The Joker Is Wild"

"The Penguin's a Jinx" is an episode of Batman, first airing in the first season on ABC on January 20, 1966 as its fourth installment. ABC rebroadcast the episode on September 1, 1966 and May 18, 1967.

== Plot synopsis ==
Picking up from the last episode, Bruce Wayne's burning feet revive him just in time, and he retrieves from his pocket his cigarette lighter containing a lifetime supply of butane gas, and throws it into the fire. A sudden blast ensues, eating up the oxygen, putting the furnace out, and throwing Bruce free from the net, far enough to make his escape.

Later, at the Batcave, as the Penguin and his "Finks" cleverly eavesdrop courtesy of a bug he planted on The Batbrella, Batman and Robin decide that the Penguin's scheme is kidnapping actress Dawn Robbins, who is in town at a penthouse apartment. Batman then discusses the whole scheme the Penguin must have, which the listening Penguin plans to carry out with an added detail of his own. Batman and Robin go to Dawn (who is bored from the life of a movie star and wants to experience something exciting). They notify her that they believe she is in danger, and she agrees to let them stay and stake-out the place.

The Penguin, Hawkeye and Sparrow swing across to Robbins' terrace on giant umbrellas; Penguin enters through the screen door and he gasses Dawn to sleep. As Batman and Robin try to stop the Penguin, a powerful magnet the Penguin had positioned just outside is turned on and they are pulled to it because of the metal in their utility belts, immobilizing them. It is later revealed that Batman and Robin had escaped from the magnet by a room service waiter and return to police headquarters.

Knowing Penguin is listening in through the umbrella's bug, they announce that the ransom will be paid at Wayne Manor and that Batman and Robin will be waiting inside the armor statues immediately inside in the entrance hall. The Penguin goes to Wayne Manor and returns the actress. He then uses his gas-umbrella to knock out anyone inside the statues. He returns to his hideout to find out that Batman and Robin were waiting there; there had been dummies inside the statues all along. The Penguin is apprehended.

== Notes ==
- The Penguin mentions his hideaway in Alaska for the first and only time in all of the Penguin episodes.
- The next time The Dynamic Duo are stuck to a magnet by the metal in their utility belts (which nearly becomes their undoing) is in the 1966 feature film.
- Leslie Parrish (as Dawn Robbins) is seen wearing exactly the same gold outfit as Linda Lorimer in Season-2 episode #9711-Pt. 1, "The Clock King's Crazy Crimes", in her role as the Car Hop who serves The Dynamic Duo "Batburgers". Parrish would later appear on the show as Glacia Glaze/Emma Strunk in Episode #9759, "Ice Spy/The Duo Defy", the Season-2 finale.
- In the final scene, a soiree at Wayne Manor, Commissioner Gordon becomes the first character to actually explain the purpose of the Bat costume. His claim that it strikes fear in criminals' hearts is a reference to a line spoken by Batman in "The Batman and How He Came to Be", a 1939 comic story published in Detective Comics #33.

Preceded by Fine Feathered Finks (airdate January 19, 1966)	Batman (TV series) episodes January 20, 1966	Succeeded by The Joker Is Wild (airdate January 26, 1966)
