= Batusi =

1960s-style go-go dance

Batusi /bæˈtuːsi/ is a 1960s-style go-go dance invented for the Batman television series. The name is a pun on the then-popular dance the Watusi.

== Performance ==
The Batusi is performed by making a horizontal V-sign with one's index and middle fingers of both hands and drawing them across in front of the eyes, away from the center of the face simultaneously, with the eyes roughly between the fingers. This is performed in time with the music and is improved upon by continuing to dance with the lower half of the body, simultaneously.

== History ==
The Batusi first appeared in the premiere episode ("Hi Diddle Riddle") of the 1960s American television series based on the comic book character Batman. It appeared again in the episode "The Pharaoh's in a Rut" that aired three months later.

There are conflicting reports as to who invented the dance, which became a national craze on the dance scene. One account is that it was invented by dance instructor Arthur Murray for Batman, and was supposedly first performed at a cocktail party at a New York City discothèque, Harlow's. In a 2005 Wizard magazine interview, Adam West claims credit for creating the Batusi's unique moves.

Versions of the dance have reappeared in many television shows, including two episodes of The Simpsons, Xena: Warrior Princess, Pinky and the Brain, and Everybody Loves Raymond, and Shaggy refers to the dance in an episode of Scooby-Doo, Where Are You! It has also been in films such as Pulp Fiction, Antz, and Return to the Batcave: The Misadventures of Adam and Burt, although John Travolta's Pulp Fiction character dances with palms facing out, while the original Batusi had the palms toward the dancer's face. In The Lego Batman Movie (2017), Alfred Pennyworth ends his recap of Batman film references by mentioning the Batusi, with footage of the dance from "The Pharaoh's in a Rut" playing. In the Titans episode "Bruce Wayne", Dick Grayson (Brenton Thwaites) hallucinates Bruce Wayne (Iain Glen) as the manifestation of Dick's guilty conscience, dancing the Batusi while mocking him.
