= Batman Is Riled =

- Batman episode
- Episode no.: Season 1 Episode 6
- Directed by: Don Weis
- Written by: Robert Dozier
- Production code: 8709-Pt. 2
- Original air date: January 27, 1966 (ABC)

Guest appearances
- Merritt Bohn; Jonathan Hole; Nancy Kovack; Dick Curtis; Jerry Dunphy; Al Wyatt; Angelo DeMeo; Special Guest Villain: Cesar Romero as The Joker

Episode chronology
← Previous "The Joker Is Wild"	Next → "Instant Freeze"

"Batman Is Riled" is the sixth episode of the Batman television series in its first season, originally airing on ABC January 27, 1966 and repeated on May 26, 1966, and May 25, 1967.

== Plot synopsis ==
The Joker is about to remove Batman's mask, but Batman escapes using a small Batmissile in his utility belt to set off the water sprinklers. Joker uses a smoke bomb to escape. As they are chasing him on the catwalks above, Joker uses trick streamers from his utility belt that wrap around Batman and Robin. He gets away before Batman and Robin can get themselves out of the confetti. When the Duo returns to the Batcave to attempt to divine the clown's next move, Joker temporarily hijacks a TV studio to broadcast another riddle as to his next crime. After solving it with Alfred's help, they track Joker to a warehouse and while in a struggle, Joker switches Batman's utility belt with his to enable his escape in the most humiliating way possible.

Batman is selected to christen the S.S. Gotham. The Joker decides to fill a champagne bottle with paralyzing gas. On the day of the christening, a crowd gathers. Joker's henchwoman hands Commissioner Gordon the bottle who in turn hands it to Batman. As Batman looks over the bottle, he notices the cork has been tampered with. After taking a pill and saying he had a headache, he hands Robin one as well and tells him to take it because it may be catching. As the bottle is broken, it releases the gas and everyone is knocked out. Joker takes Batman and Robin back to his hideout (thinking they are knocked out) and broadcasts his ultimatum on television—either he gets the S.S. Gotham or Batman and Robin will be executed like the famous display in the wax museums. Batman and Robin spring into action having taken their Universal Drug Antidote Pill. The Joker is caught and brought to justice.

== Notes ==
- The Joker calls his villainous gameshow on TV What's My Crime?, based loosely on Goodson-Todman's favorite guessing game What's My Line? (CBS, 1950–67). Cesar Romero actually appeared a couple of times on What's My Line?. He appeared as a mystery guest on December 14, 1952, and as a guest panelist on September 29, 1957. What's My Crime? was also the name of a What's My Line? parody that appeared in Disney's animated film One Hundred and One Dalmatians.
- William Dozier says the words "What's this???" for the first time. It became a go-to phrase for anyone imitating his breathless narration.
- The Joker breaking into TV broadcasts is an adaption of him breaking into radio broadcasts from Batman #1. The gimmick was also used in comic book story "The Laughing Fish" by Steve Englehart, as well as the 1989 film Batman, the 1992 animated series, and 2008's The Dark Knight.
- Joker's opera mask is similar to that worn by Heath Ledger in The Dark Knight.
- Many events in this episode are based on the silver comic book story Batman #73 "The Joker's Utility Belt".
- The entire two-part adventure constitutes rather a deep commentary on the influence of television and newspapers in forming public opinion, especially when the media rail against the dynamic duo. One man even shouts at the two as they are about to christen the S.S. Gotham, "Hey! What are you two guys doing here when the Joker's out there taking over the city?"

Preceded by The Joker Is Wild (airdate January 26, 1966)	Batman (TV series) episodes January 27, 1966	Succeeded by Instant Freeze (airdate February 2, 1966)
