= Orleans Cove =

Coordinates: 41°47′45.2″N 69°58′38.1″W

Orleans Cove is the cove in the town of Orleans, Massachusetts

Looking for a place to establish a settlement, Samuel de Champlain came ashore at Orleans Cove in 1605. Champlain liked the area but commented that "too many people already lived there." Champlain went back north, landing in Nova Scotia at an inlet on the south shore of Baie Francaise, which Champlain named Port Royal. Some claim this was the first permanent French settlement in Canada, although there is some evidence that Breton fishermen had settled in the Newfoundland area by this time.

Orleans Cove was the landfall of various French transatlantic telegraph cables. The French Cable Station Museum is just inland from the cove. The French Cable Station Museum houses some of the original equipment to lay the French transatlantic telegraph cables. The first French cable was laid in 1869 from Le Minou near Brest to St. Pierre and then on to Duxbury. In 1891, the French cables reaching the US were grouped at the French Cable Station at Orleans Cove. These cables allowed for communication between North America and France.
