= WVTV =

Television station in Milwaukee

- Milwaukee, Wisconsin; United States
- Channels: Digital: 27 (UHF); Virtual: 18, 24
- Branding: CW 18; My 24 WCGV (24.1)

Programming
- Affiliations: 18.1: The CW; 24.1: Independent with MyNetworkTV; for others, see § Subchannels

Ownership
- Owner: Standard Media; (Community News Media LLC)

History
- First air date: October 3, 1953
- Former call signs: WOKY-TV (1953–1955); WXIX (1955–1963); WUHF (1963–1966)
- Former channel numbers: Analog: 19 (UHF, 1953–1958), 18 (UHF, 1958–2009); Digital: 61 (UHF, 2003–2009), 18 (UHF, 2009–2019)
- Former affiliations: ABC (1953–1955); DuMont (secondary, 1953–1955); CBS (1955–April 1959); Dark (April−July 1959); Independent (July 1959–1997); ABC/CBS (secondary, 1960–1981); NBC (secondary, 1960–1994); The WB (1997–2006)
- Call sign meaning: Call sign changed in 1966 to symbolize a "fresh start"

Technical information
- Licensing authority: FCC
- Facility ID: 74174
- ERP: 1,000 kW
- HAAT: 318 m (1,043 ft)
- Transmitter coordinates: 43°5′48″N 87°54′18″W

Links
- Public license information: Public file; LMS
- Website: cw18milwaukee.com

WVTV (channels 18 and 24) is a television station in Milwaukee, Wisconsin, United States, affiliated with The CW and owned by Standard Media. The station's studios are located on Calumet Road in the Park Place office park near the I-41/US 45 interchange on Milwaukee's northwest side; its transmitter is located on North Humboldt Boulevard in Milwaukee's Estabrook Park neighborhood as part of the Milwaukee PBS tower.

WVTV operates a second digital subchannel branded as My 24 WCGV, which is programmed as an independent station with a secondary affiliation with MyNetworkTV, and which is the flagship station for the Milwaukee Bucks television network. It uses virtual channel 24.1, formerly utilized by separately licensed WCGV-TV until January 2018, when then-owner Sinclair Broadcast Group turned in WCGV-TV's license and merged its subchannels onto WVTV's spectrum after selling WCGV-TV's spectrum in the 2016 Federal Communications Commission (FCC) incentive auction.

== History ==
=== Early years ===
WVTV is the second-oldest continuously operating station in Milwaukee. The station first signed on the air on October 3, 1953, as WOKY-TV, broadcasting on UHF channel 19. It was owned by Bartell Broadcasters, along with WOKY radio (920 AM). The station originally operated as a primary ABC and secondary DuMont affiliate. On October 21, 1954, CBS purchased WOKY-TV for $335,000 and announced it was moving its programming there from its original affiliate in the city, WCAN-TV (channel 25, now defunct). The purchase resulted in a call letter change to WXIX (referencing the Roman numeral for 19) on February 27, 1955. It then moved into WCAN's former studio on North 27th Street, where it remained until being sold by CBS less than four years later.

This made the station the first network owned-and-operated station in the Milwaukee market. WXIX's tenure as a CBS O&O, however, was not successful. Only a small percentage of television sets in the Milwaukee area were capable of receiving UHF stations at the time, as set manufacturers were not required to equip televisions with UHF tuners until 1964 as a result of the 1961 passage of the All-Channel Receiver Act. Those viewers not lucky enough to get a signal from WBBM-TV in Chicago, WISC-TV in Madison, or WBAY-TV in Green Bay were forced to rely on expensive UHF converters to watch channel 19, and even then the picture quality left a lot to be desired. However, unlike many early UHF stations, it managed to survive into the All-Channel era.

The station moved to channel 18 in 1958 in a Federal Communications Commission (FCC) channel alignment change. However, this saw little improvement in the ratings. CBS concluded that it was better to have its programming on a VHF station, even if it was only an affiliate. The obvious candidate was independent station WITI-TV (channel 6), which had just signed on two years earlier. CBS officially moved its programming to WITI on April 1, 1959 (although WXIX would later make a secondary arrangement to carry any CBS shows that WISN-TV pre-empted after the latter's switch to the network in 1961). WITI also took over the WXIX studio facilities on North 27th Street, the same facilities once occupied by former CBS affiliate WCAN-TV. WXIX went dark that same day but returned on July 20 of that year after being purchased by Gene Posner, the owner of Cream City Broadcasting and others. The WXIX studios moved to a small area at the top of Milwaukee's Schroeder Hotel (renamed the Sheraton Schroeder Hotel in 1965; renamed the Marc Plaza in 1972; currently known as the Hilton Milwaukee City Center hotel). From this point on, WXIX was an independent station, and in 1963 changed its call letters to WUHF after another ownership change.

=== As an independent station ===
The WKY Television System, based in Oklahoma City and the forerunner to Gaylord Broadcasting, bought the station in 1966 and changed its call letters to WVTV. The new owners also built new studio facilities at the corner of North 35th Street and Capitol Drive. This started the station on its path to becoming one of the most popular independent stations in the country, with strong local programming such as The Bowling Game (which would eventually be syndicated across the Midwest), along with a strong slate of syndicated programs such as cartoons, classic off-network sitcoms, more recent sitcoms, drama series, sports, and movies. Like its Gaylord stablemates, channel 18 focused on programming geared to Milwaukee's outer suburbs and rural areas, as opposed to the more urban fare presented by Milwaukee's other stations. Longtime staples on WVTV included Hee Haw (which was produced by sister division Gaylord Entertainment), The Lawrence Welk Show as well as syndicated reruns of Green Acres and The Andy Griffith Show. The station also aired All Star Wrestling during the 1970s and 1980s.

The station aired the CBS version of The Merv Griffin Show after WISN-TV (channel 12) rejected it. After Griffin was canceled by CBS, WVTV aired The Dick Cavett Show, which had been preempted by WITI; interestingly enough, a majority of ABC shows WITI had passed during its tenure with the network was picked up by WVTV until the secondary arrangement deal between the parties ended in 1972. The station also aired The Tonight Show Starring Johnny Carson from 1984 to 1988, due to WTMJ-TV (channel 4) being denied permission by NBC to air the program in a later timeslot so that it could air syndicated programs after its late evening newscast.

As cable television became more popular, WVTV became a regional superstation in the mold of sister stations KTVT in Fort Worth, KHTV (now KIAH) in Houston and KSTW in Tacoma. At its height, it was available on nearly every cable system in Wisconsin, as well as a few providers in Michigan, Minnesota, and the Dakotas. This resulted in the station rebranding as "Super 18, Wisconsin's Superstation" in 1987. The station was carried on Green Bay area cable providers until June 2007, when WWAZ-TV (channel 68, now WIWN) replaced it for a short time before terminating analog operations the next year and a four-year build-out of digital operations in Milwaukee. Despite its status as one of the strongest independent stations in the country, channel 18 turned down an offer by the fledgling Fox Broadcasting Company for an affiliation in 1986. Most of the smaller markets in WVTV's cable footprints had enough stations to provide a local Fox affiliate at the outset, which made the prospect of WVTV as a multi-market Fox affiliate unattractive to Gaylord. Sister station KSTW passed on the Fox affiliation for Seattle–Tacoma for this reason. The Fox affiliation went to six-year-old upstart WCGV-TV.

WVTV continued to be the leading independent station in the market until Fox came into its own, resulting in a boost in WCGV's ratings. The station's ownership went into a state of flux after Gaylord began easing out of the television business (except for its stake in The Nashville Network). In 1994, Gaylord entered into a local marketing agreement with WCGV, which was owned by Abry Communications. Although WCGV was the senior partner, the two stations' operations were merged at WVTV's original studio facilities.

WVTV was originally tapped to be a charter affiliate of The WB Television Network along with Gaylord's other independent stations. The new network was due to launch in 1994, but when it was delayed to 1995 instead, Gaylord sued to void the agreement. However, the New World/Fox affiliation deal in 1994 shifted network affiliations in many markets; Gaylord was able to reach an affiliation deal with CBS to switch KSTW and KTVT to the network. Locally, the deal included WITI, which would switch from CBS to Fox in December 1994. After being turned down by WISN-TV and WTMJ-TV, CBS approached WVTV. However, WVTV turned the offer down as well. CBS then aligned itself with then low-profile independent WDJT-TV (channel 58). When The WB launched in January 1995, Milwaukee became the second-largest market in the country without an affiliate. Milwaukee viewers were forced to watch The WB's programming on cable through Chicago-based WGN-TV, which was then carrying the network nationally (although the station could also be received via antenna in the southern edges of the Milwaukee market). By this time, channel 18 was airing more syndicated talk shows during the day, and aired first-run syndicated programming such as Xena: Warrior Princess and Hercules: The Legendary Journeys in primetime under the branding "VTV Prime".

On July 24, 1995, Gaylord sold WVTV to Glencairn Ltd. Glencairn had tried to buy WVTV a year earlier, but the sale had fallen through. A few months earlier, Sinclair Broadcast Group had become WCGV's owner as a result of the company's merger with Abry. Glencairn, in turn, was owned by a former Sinclair executive. For all intents and purposes, Sinclair owned both stations even though FCC rules forbade duopolies at the time. Sinclair further circumvented the rules by continuing the LMA.

=== Affiliation with The WB ===
WVTV continued to be an independent station for two more years, with The WB pushing for more national distribution beyond the Tribune Company's broadcast stations and WGN-TV's superstation. Sinclair struck a large affiliation deal with The WB for several of the UPN affiliates and independent stations it either owned or controlled on May 19, 1997, an agreement which included WVTV. WVTV finally picked up the WB affiliation the same day and changed its on-air branding to "WB 18"; the following January, WCGV disaffiliated from UPN as a part of the same agreement. With The WB's drive to have stations in other markets take the network and pushing market exclusivity for those stations, Sinclair made the decision to begin winding down carriage agreements with providers outside of the Milwaukee and Green Bay markets, ending WVTV's status as a regional superstation. Sinclair also wanted to push viewership to WCGV, though it soon restored its UPN affiliation in August 1998 due to a ratings plunge and a conciliatory agreement to restore the network between UPN and Sinclair.

WVTV finally became wholly owned by Sinclair in 2000, after a long legal battle between Sinclair and Jesse Jackson and his Rainbow/PUSH coalition about the racial issues of one concern holding two broadcast licenses in a market. Jackson argued that Glencairn ownership was making an end-around by passing itself off as a minority-owned company (its president, Edwin Edwards, was black) when it was really an arm of Sinclair, and used the LMA to gain control of the station. By this point, however, the FCC had overturned regulations that had disallowed television duopolies, and the sale to Sinclair went through despite these objections.

=== Switch to The CW ===
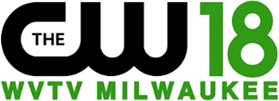
WVTV's first CW logo from September 18, 2006, until the restoration of the "Super 18" branding in January 2016.

Following Time Warner and CBS Corporation's January 24, 2006, announcement of The WB and UPN's shutdown and the launch of the jointly owned CW Television Network, Sinclair announced on May 2, 2006, that WVTV would become The CW's Milwaukee affiliate upon the network's September 18 launch. Sister station WCGV affiliated with MyNetworkTV two weeks before on September 5, creating one of five Sinclair-owned and/or controlled CW/MyNetworkTV duopolies in the country at the time. WVTV continued to identify as "WB 18" during the summer months, officially switching to the new "CW 18" branding on September 18, though the station's logo bug was changed the week before to the "CW18" logo while promoting the network's pending launch.

On June 28, 2007, Time Warner Cable began carrying WVTV's high definition digital signal on its southeastern Wisconsin systems on digital channel 1018, along with WCGV on channel 1024 (formerly 518 and 524, respectively, before an October 2009 channel remapping), after Sinclair and Time Warner struck a compensation agreement for the stations. Charter Communications, the other major cable provider in the area, reached a compensation agreement in April 2007, but the HD signal was not added until June 9, 2009, when the station began to air on digital channel 618 throughout Charter's southeastern Wisconsin systems.

==== July 2010 flooding incident and studio move ====
On July 22, 2010, the Milwaukee area experienced a major flash flooding event which caused major damage in several parts of Milwaukee County. The studios of WVTV/WCGV were then located a half-mile south of Lincoln Creek, on the corner of North 35th Street and Capitol Drive, and the building and technical equipment belonging to the stations suffered major damage, forcing channels 18 and 24 off the air for the majority of the time after 6 p.m. on July 22 until the early morning of July 24; the two stations, once they returned to the air, had their programming fed into their master control facilities via another unknown Sinclair master control. For both stations, this resulted in most of the station's paid programming and other timeslots where the Sinclair facility did not have an episode of a particular series within the schedule replaced with reruns of Coach and advertisements were replaced with direct response national advertising. Both stations eventually resumed local operations later during the week of July 25, but broadcast in 480i standard definition and did not display digital on-screen bugs at all due to damage to the station's high definition broadcasting equipment for most of the following month. HD programming was restored on August 20, 2010.

Because the flooding caused irreparable damage to the building, forcing most operations for the stations up to transition to smaller facilities on the second floor of the building, Sinclair immediately began a search for new facilities for WVTV and WCGV, which would allow locally produced and syndicated programs to be broadcast in high definition full-time without the complexities of rewiring an older and flood damaged studio and master control facility. On June 6, 2012, Sinclair received approval from the Milwaukee Common Council's Zoning, Neighborhoods and Development Committee to move to an existing building near the I-41/US 45 Interchange on Milwaukee's northeast side on Calumet Road in the Park Place office park and install receiving satellite dishes, generators and a studio/transmitter link tower, with full Common Council approval coming a week later on June 12. The stations moved to the new building in December 2013, with the new master control coming online in the last week of the month.

From June 2012 until the end of December 2013, the engineering and master control of WVTV/WCGV transmitted 16:9 syndicated programming in full screen, but in standard definition as a stopgap solution until the move to the new studios. Upon the opening of the new master control, all syndicated programming available in the format now is aired in high definition.

==== Current station status ====
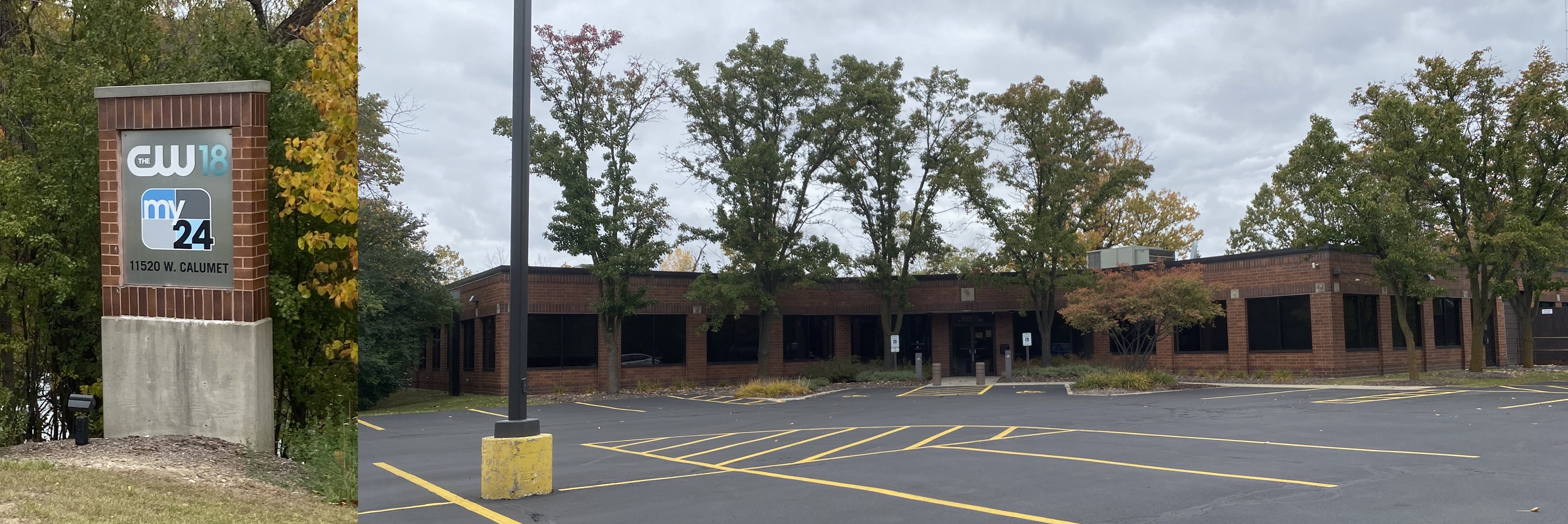
The studio facility for both WVTV's main CW channel and "My24" in October 2022, with the monument sign in front of WVTV's entrance displayed on the left separately.

logo after revert back from Super 18 branding, 2017-2024

Despite its long broadcasting history, WVTV has been one of The CW's weaker affiliates in terms of viewership. In the past, Sinclair put more promotional effort into WCGV. While this trend dated back to the mid-1990s, it became more pronounced from 2006 onward, as WCGV's affiliation with MyNetworkTV allowed more experimentation with its schedule. Both stations have seen their talk-heavy daytime lineups struggle against the classic television programming of Weigel's WBME-CD (channel 41), which is one of the flagships of the MeTV network. Despite this, WVTV and all of Sinclair's CW stations were renewed in a long-term agreement with the CW on July 9, 2015, which keeps the network on the station in the long term. By the 2014–15 season, Sinclair had settled on having WVTV's daytime schedule dependent on talk show programming, while WCGV featured a mixed schedule of court shows, sitcoms and lifestyle programming, with WVTV's ratings eventually stabilizing as The CW has found better success in later seasons.

Beginning in the fall of 2015, former WKLH morning show host Carole Caine (who left that role in June 2015 after her contract was not renewed, to much local criticism against the station) began to perform various roles for Sinclair's Milwaukee operations, but mainly with WVTV, including acting as a station liaison for public events and taking over as the station's voiceover announcer, replacing various centralcasted voices which had come out of Sinclair's various national deals with announcers for their stations.

On January 18, 2016, tying into the launch of the new CW/DC Comics series Legends of Tomorrow and Sinclair's growing emphasis of using local heritage brandings of their stations rather than generic "network/channel number" brandings, the station was rebranded as Super 18, The CW, reviving the branding it used from 1987 to 1995. (WVTV reinstated the "CW 18" branding in September 2017, mainly in order to streamline its promotions with those of Sinclair's other CW affiliates.)

On May 8, 2017, Sinclair entered into an agreement to acquire Tribune Media – owner of Fox affiliate WITI – for $3.9 billion, plus the assumption of $2.7 billion in debt held by Tribune, pending regulatory approval by the FCC and the U.S. Department of Justice's Antitrust Division. Sinclair had already announced that WCGV's license was sold in April in the FCC's 2016 spectrum auction and later announced that in technicality, WCGV would go off the air completely with its schedule moved to WVTV's second subchannel. The transaction would have alleviated any regulatory complications involving the sale within Milwaukee, outside any physical and employee assets which would have needed to be sorted out later on (including the then-likely move of the WVTV/My 24 intellectual unit to WITI's Brown Deer facility).

On July 18, 2018, the FCC voted to have the Sinclair–Tribune acquisition reviewed by an administrative law judge amid "serious concerns" about Sinclair's forthrightness in its applications to sell certain conflict properties. Three weeks later on August 9, Tribune announced it would terminate the Sinclair deal, intending to seek other M&A opportunities. Tribune also filed a breach of contract lawsuit in the Delaware Chancery Court, alleging that Sinclair engaged in protracted negotiations with the FCC and the U.S. Department of Justice's Antitrust Division over regulatory issues, refused to sell stations in markets where it already had properties, and proposed divestitures to parties with ties to Sinclair executive chair David D. Smith that were rejected or highly subject to rejection to maintain control over stations it was required to sell.

On March 11, 2025, it was reported that Sinclair would sell five TV stations, including WVTV, to Rincon Broadcasting Group, led by Todd Parkin. The sale was approved by the FCC on July 1, and completed on July 9. In March 2026, Community News Media LLC, which operates as Standard Media Group and is led by Soohyung Kim with Deborah McDermott as chief executive, agreed to acquire Rincon Broadcasting's stations, including WVTV, for $116.5 million; the sale was completed on October 1.

== Programming ==
=== Sports programming ===
WVTV was the longtime home of the Milwaukee Brewers (1981–1988; 1993–1997), Milwaukee Bucks (1976–1988; 1994–1999), Big Ten Conference men's basketball, and area college sports teams.

Because of non-preemptable coverage of the 2008 Summer Olympics on NBC affiliate WTMJ-TV, WVTV aired two Green Bay Packers preseason games against the San Francisco 49ers and Denver Broncos respectively on August 16 and 22 of that year, a role previously taken by Ion Television station WPXE-TV (channel 55) during the 2004 preseason.

On July 10, 2026, Good Karma Brands and the Milwaukee Bucks announced that their 2026–27 schedule (starting with the team's NBA Summer League games two days later) would be carried in full (excluding national broadcasts) on WVTV's "My 24" channel, with Good Karma handling advertising sales and affiliate relations for a statewide network to be announced. The agreement returned the Bucks to channel 24 and its forerunner service for the first time since the 1993–94 season.

=== Newscasts ===
From 1979 to 1986, WVTV aired local news and weather updates running in varying lengths of between two and five minutes between programs. In 1989, the station formed a full-time news department and began producing an hour-long primetime newscast called The Nine O'Clock Nightly News, which was anchored by Liz Talbot and Duane Gay. The newscast was discontinued on March 12, 1993, shortly after entering into the LMA with WCGV. The reason for discontinuing the news was because Milwaukee Brewers games were moving from WCGV to WVTV to make room for Fox programs on WCGV. Duane Gay would then move on to WISN-TV, where he continued on as a reporter, even after being diagnosed with a vicious form of soft tissue cancer in 1997; Gay would continue to work for channel 12 in any capacity he physically could, and spoke well of his time at WVTV until he died on April 26, 2005.

Newscasts returned to the station in August 2003 with the launch of WB18 News at 9, an hour-long program which featured a mix of local news stories from staff at WVTV's facility (anchored by Lisa Fielding on weeknights, and Tami Hughes on weekends), and national and international reports, weather forecasts and sports segments from Sinclair's News Central local/national hybrid operation based at the company's headquarters in Hunt Valley, Maryland. It also aired The Point, a controversial one-minute conservative political commentary feature, that was a requirement of all Sinclair-owned stations that aired newscasts (regardless of whether it carried the News Central format or not). The program was reduced to a half-hour in September 2005 due to ratings issues, and was eventually discontinued on March 31, 2006, due to cutbacks in Sinclair's news operations companywide, which included the disbandment of its News Central division.

As of 2013, Terry Gaughan, general manager of WVTV and WCGV, said there were no plans to relaunch a news operation; although the station had inquired the market's existing news-producing stations about entering into a news share agreement. WVTV began to carry Sinclair's national morning newscast The National Desk in January 2021, then the late primetime edition in September 2021. Currently, the station's local programming output is limited to the public affairs program Connect MKE which airs several times a week on both WVTV subchannels. The program was previously known as Our Issues Milwaukee from 2013 until the end of 2021.

== Technical information ==
=== Subchannels ===
The station's signal is multiplexed, with the former WCGV channels numbered with virtual channel 24:

Subchannels of WVTV
| Subchannel | Res. | Short name | Programming |
|---|---|---|---|
| 18.1 | 1080i | CW 18 | The CW |
| 24.1 | 720p | My 24 | Independent with MyNetworkTV |
| 24.2 | 480i | COMET | Comet |
| 24.3 | 480i | Charge! | Charge! |

On June 23, 2014, Sinclair Broadcast Group and Sony Pictures Entertainment announced an affiliation agreement for Sony's digital subchannel movie network, getTV, which included WVTV for the Milwaukee market and came online the afternoon of July 3. Sony leased the channel space on 18.2 for their network. Charter added WVTV-DT2 to their systems on December 2, 2014, which is carried on channel 179. The network was dropped on January 2, 2018, one week ahead of WCGV merging their channels onto WVTV's spectrum as part of Sinclair's sale of WCGV's spectrum back to the FCC in the 2016 auction. WCGV's existing channel numbers were retained. WIWN (channel 68) eventually picked up getTV in late March 2018 for their fourth subchannel.

A second audio program channel was added to WVTV in 2019, allowing access to Descriptive Video Service for CW programming, along with the Spanish dub available for their program Jane the Virgin.

=== Analog-to-digital conversion ===
On February 2, 2009, Sinclair told cable and satellite television providers via e-mail that regardless of the exact mandatory switchover date to digital-only broadcasting for full-power stations (which Congress rescheduled for June 12 days later), the station would shut down its analog signal on the original transition date of February 17. WVTV ended regular programming on its analog signal, over UHF channel 18, at 9 a.m. on that date. The station's digital signal relocated from its pre-transition UHF channel 61, which was among the high band UHF channels (52-69) that were removed from broadcasting use as a result of the transition, to its analog-era UHF channel 18 for post-transition operations.

As part of the SAFER Act, WVTV kept its analog signal on the air until March 4 to inform viewers of the digital television transition through a loop of public service announcements from the National Association of Broadcasters. As WVTV was the only Milwaukee station that did not retain its pre-transition digital channel, the station's digital transmitter and antenna have been continually undergone tuning adjustments since the transition to improve reception.
