= WCAN-TV =

Television station in Milwaukee (1953–1955)

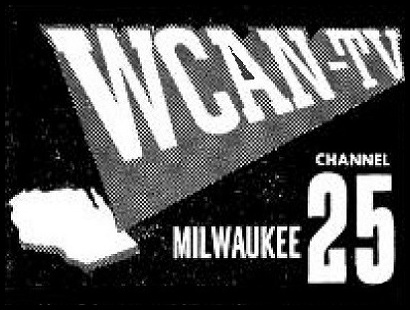
- Milwaukee, Wisconsin; United States
- Channels: Analog: 25 (UHF)

Programming
- Affiliations: CBS

Ownership
- Owner: Midwest Broadcasting Company

History
- First air date: September 6, 1953
- Last air date: February 26, 1955

WCAN-TV (channel 25) was a television station in Milwaukee, Wisconsin, United States, which operated from 1953 to 1955. It was the second television station and first ultra high frequency (UHF) outlet in Milwaukee and was owned by Midwest Broadcasting Company. Affiliated with CBS throughout its history, it shut down when the network bought its primary competitor, WOKY-TV (channel 19), taking with it the CBS affiliation; Poller sold the physical plant to CBS, while the WCAN-TV construction permit remained active and in force until 1969.

== Establishment ==
After the Federal Communications Commission (FCC) lifted its freeze on television station assignments in 1952, it opened up new channels in the UHF band, among them channels 19, 25, and 31 for Milwaukee. Radio station WCAN (1250 AM) originally had filed for channel 12, a very high frequency (VHF) assignment, but it opted to withdraw from that contest and apply from channel 25 because three other groups also sought channel 12. They were not alone in doing so. WFOX (860 AM) also applied for channel 12 and switched its application to channel 25 in the same week, setting up a potential comparative hearing. A third applicant, Harry Balaban's Northwestern Television Company, also filed for the channel but later amended its application to specify channel 19.

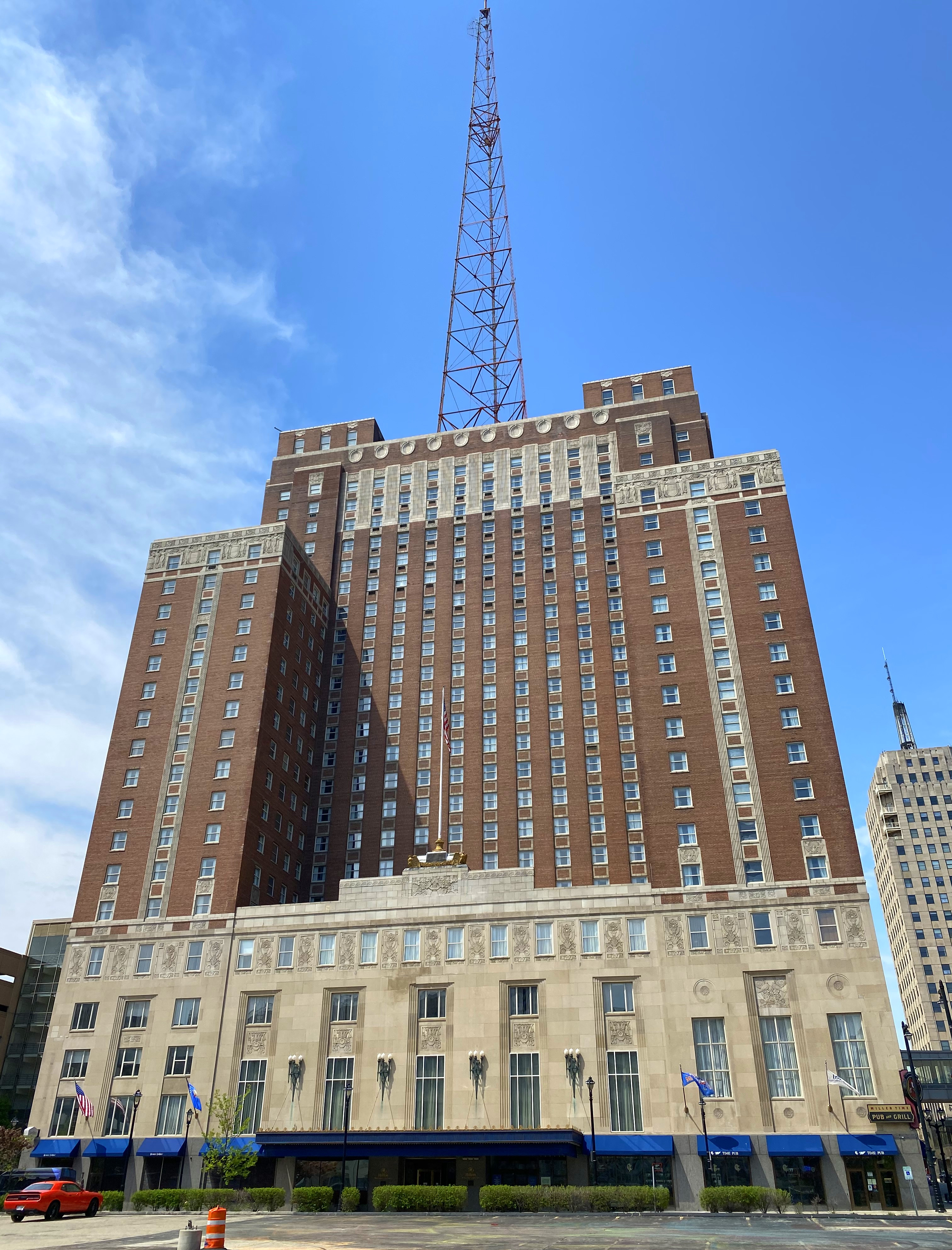
The tower atop the Schroeder Hotel was built for WCAN-TV's transmitter.

When WFOX then decided to go after channel 19, incorrectly believing that the recent award to the corporate owners of WOKY (920 AM) of a permit for a station in Madison disqualified them from receiving a permit for Milwaukee, WCAN was left alone on channel 25; on February 5, 1953, it received the first new construction permit for a Milwaukee television station in five years. Studio facilities would be split between WCAN's Third Street radio studios and the transmitter facility at Hales Corners, where the WCAN-TV transmitter was planned to be sited. However, by July, WCAN-TV had changed its plans to put the studios in the Towne Hotel and its antenna on a new mast atop the Schroeder Hotel. Affiliation with CBS was secured in August 1953, relieving Milwaukee's pre-freeze WTMJ-TV of its CBS hookup. Tower work was bogged down by rain that prevented completion of the mast and delayed the station in broadcasting test patterns.

At 11:30 p.m. on September 6, 1953, WCAN-TV began broadcasting, with local and CBS shows telecast from the start. By this time, Lou Poller had become the majority owner of Midwest Broadcasting Company, with the rest owned by Cy Blumenthal and Alex Rosenman. Effective radiated power was originally 22,000 watts, raised to 212,000 with the installation of a new transmitter at the start of 1954.

In October 1953, as part of a dispute over channel 12—then the only other assigned commercial VHF channel for Milwaukee—a proposal was formulated to add channel 6 to Milwaukee on a suggestion of Hearst Radio Inc., owner of radio station WISN (1130 AM). Poller unsuccessfully fought the proposal and also started an association of UHF television stations.

Despite being a UHF station in a market where only between 62 and 70 percent of television sets could receive UHF stations like WCAN-TV, ratings were above-average. One May 1954 article in Billboard found that, in early April, WCAN-TV beat WTMJ-TV in a string of key time slots with both CBS and local programs, at a time when other UHF stations were folding. WCAN-TV and fellow UHF outlet WOKY-TV, an ABC/DuMont affiliate on channel 19, both made money. The Towne Hotel sued WCAN-TV at one point for usurping its lobby after a station program drew 200 teens to the second-floor studios.

== Demise and activity after shutdown ==
On October 21, 1954, CBS agreed to purchase WOKY-TV for $335,000 in light of new ownership limits that allowed station groups to own five VHF plus two UHF stations; one reason CBS chose Milwaukee for a UHF outlet was because of WCAN-TV's strong promotion of UHF set conversion. While this might have otherwise dislodged ABC from channel 19 to replace the defecting CBS, a second VHF station, WTVW (channel 12), was about to launch. In an unusual complication, CBS paid Lou Poller $786,000 for the WCAN-TV physical plant atop the Schroeder Hotel and then was paid $286,000 for the WOKY-TV physical plant, including a new studio building, to which WCAN-TV would migrate. Poller would also be paid an early termination fee if WOKY-TV assumed the CBS affiliation any sooner than April 22, when the WCAN-TV–CBS affiliation agreement was set to expire. Meanwhile, WCAN radio was sold off when WEMP (1340 AM) purchased the entire transmitter facility and license to move to 1250. The changeover occurred after February 26, 1955, when WCAN-TV left the air; on February 27, WOKY-TV became the new CBS affiliate in Milwaukee as WXIX. WXIX also took on some of WCAN-TV's staff.

Poller filed a $4.35 million antitrust lawsuit against CBS, charging a conspiracy by CBS and others to force Poller out of business. He claimed that Storer Broadcasting had given Poller a firm offer to purchase WCAN-TV for $2 million and that, on assurances from CBS, Poller renewed a studio lease worth $500,000. The case was allowed to go to trial in February 1962 after the Supreme Court of the United States voted 5–4 that Poller was entitled to a trial after a lower court erred in issuing a summary judgment. However, this development was overshadowed by Poller's indictment on perjury charges later that year.

In 1958, the FCC shifted the UHF channel allocations in Milwaukee from channels 19, 25, and 31 to channels 18, 24, and 30, to eliminate second harmonic interference to reception of WXIX. The WCAN-TV construction permit was still in force at that time. Lou Poller sold the permit in 1966 to Field Communications, which had just put WFLD on the air in Chicago and had previously applied for a completely new construction permit for Milwaukee. Field sought to rezone a parcel in Mequon to house a new 999-foot (304 m) tower and studio; the station would serve as a part-time rebroadcaster of WFLD to originate up to 25 percent of its own programs. Field announced it would dispose of the permit in 1969, when it announced its intention to sell WFLD to Metromedia.

In 1973, a new station on channel 24, WCGV-TV, was awarded a construction permit. It began broadcasting in March 1980.
