= De Havilland Mosquito =

British multi-role combat aircraft of WW2

DH.98 Mosquito
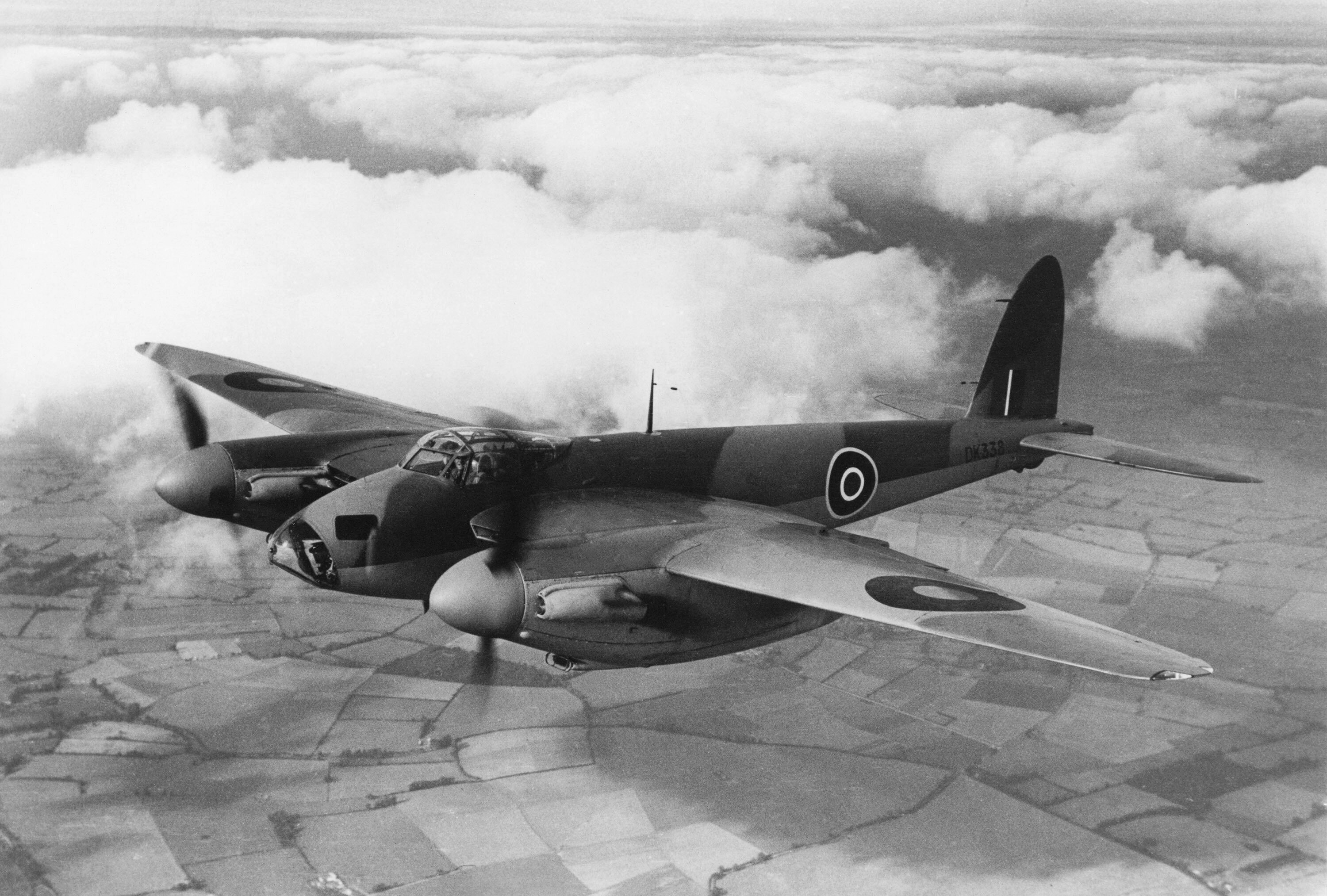
- Mosquito B Mk IV Series 2 bomber with No. 105 Squadron of the Royal Air Force

General information
- Type: Light bomber; Fighter-bomber; Night fighter; Maritime strike aircraft; Photo-reconnaissance aircraft
- National origin: United Kingdom
- Manufacturer: de Havilland
- Status: Retired
- Primary users: Royal Air Force: Royal Canadian Air Force; Royal Australian Air Force; United States Army Air Forces
- Number built: 7,781

History
- Manufactured: 1940–1950
- Introduction date: 17 November 1941
- First flight: 25 November 1940
- Retired: 1963

The de Havilland DH.98 Mosquito was a British twin-engined, multi-role combat aircraft, introduced during the Second World War. Unusual in that its airframe was constructed mostly of wood, it was nicknamed the "Wooden Wonder", or "Mossie". In 1941, it was one of the fastest operational aircraft in the world.

Originally conceived as an unarmed fast bomber, the Mosquito's use evolved during the war into many roles, including low- to medium-altitude daytime tactical bomber, high-altitude night bomber, pathfinder, day or night fighter, fighter-bomber, intruder, maritime strike, and photo-reconnaissance aircraft. It was also used by the British Overseas Airways Corporation as a fast transport to carry small, high-value cargo to and from neutral countries through enemy-controlled airspace. The crew of two, pilot and navigator, sat side by side. A single passenger could ride in the aircraft's bomb bay when necessary.

The Mosquito FB Mk. VI was often flown in special raids, such as Operation Jericho (an attack on Amiens Prison in early 1944), and precision attacks against military intelligence, security, and police facilities (such as Gestapo headquarters). On 30 January 1943, the 10th anniversary of Hitler being made chancellor and the Nazis gaining power, a morning Mosquito attack knocked out the main Berlin broadcasting station while Hermann Göring was speaking, taking his speech off the air.

The Mosquito flew with the Royal Air Force (RAF) and other air forces in the European, Mediterranean, and Italian theatres. The Mosquito was also operated by the RAF in the Southeast Asian theatre and by the Royal Australian Air Force based in the Moluccas and Borneo during the Pacific War. During the 1950s, the RAF replaced the Mosquito with the jet-powered English Electric Canberra.

== Development ==
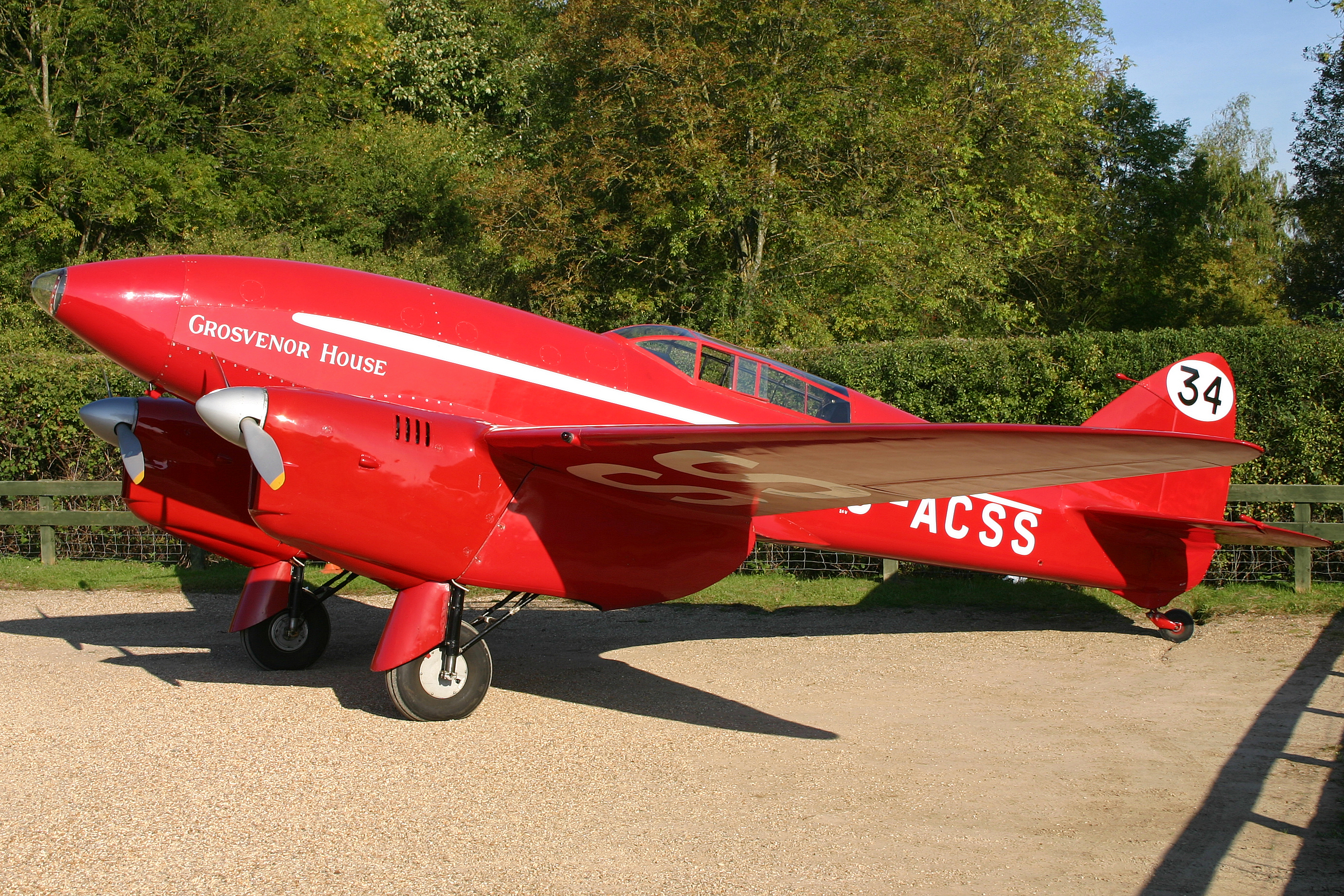
Construction concepts pioneered in the DH.88 Comet were later used in the Mosquito.

By the early to mid-1930s, de Havilland had built a reputation for innovative high-speed aircraft with the DH.88 Comet racer. Later, the DH.91 Albatross airliner pioneered the composite wood construction used for the Mosquito. The 22-passenger Albatross could cruise at 210 mph (340 km/h) at 11,000 ft (3,400 m), faster than the Handley Page H.P.42 and other biplanes it was replacing. (Note: Part 2 of article is in the July 1990 volume.) The wooden monocoque construction not only saved weight and compensated for the low power of the de Havilland Gipsy Twelve engines used by this aircraft, but also simplified production and reduced construction time.

=== Air Ministry bomber requirements and concepts ===
On 8 September 1936, the British Air Ministry issued Specification P.13/36, which called for a twin-engined medium bomber capable of carrying a bomb load of 3,000 lb (1,400 kg) for 3,000 mi (4,800 km) with a maximum speed of 275 mph (445 km/h) at 15,000 ft (4,600 m); a maximum bomb load of 8,000 lb (3,600 kg) carried over shorter ranges was also required. Aviation firms entered heavy designs with new high-powered engines and multiple defensive turrets, leading to the production of the Avro Manchester and Handley Page Halifax.

In May 1937, as a comparison to P.13/36, George Volkert, the chief designer of Handley Page, put forward the concept of a fast, unarmed bomber. In 20 pages, Volkert planned an aerodynamically clean, medium bomber to carry 3,000 lb (1,400 kg) of bombs at a cruising speed of 300 mph (485 km/h). Support existed in the RAF and Air Ministry; Captain R. N. Liptrot, Research Director Aircraft 3, appraised Volkert's design, calculating that its top speed would exceed that of the new Supermarine Spitfire, but counter-arguments held that although such a design had merit, it would not necessarily be faster than enemy fighters for long. The ministry was also considering using non-strategic materials for aircraft production, which, in 1938, had led to specification B.9/38 and the Armstrong Whitworth Albemarle medium bomber, largely constructed from spruce and plywood attached to a steel-tube frame. The idea of a small, fast bomber gained support at a much earlier stage than is sometimes acknowledged, though the Air Ministry likely envisaged it using light alloy components.

=== Inception of the de Havilland fast bomber ===
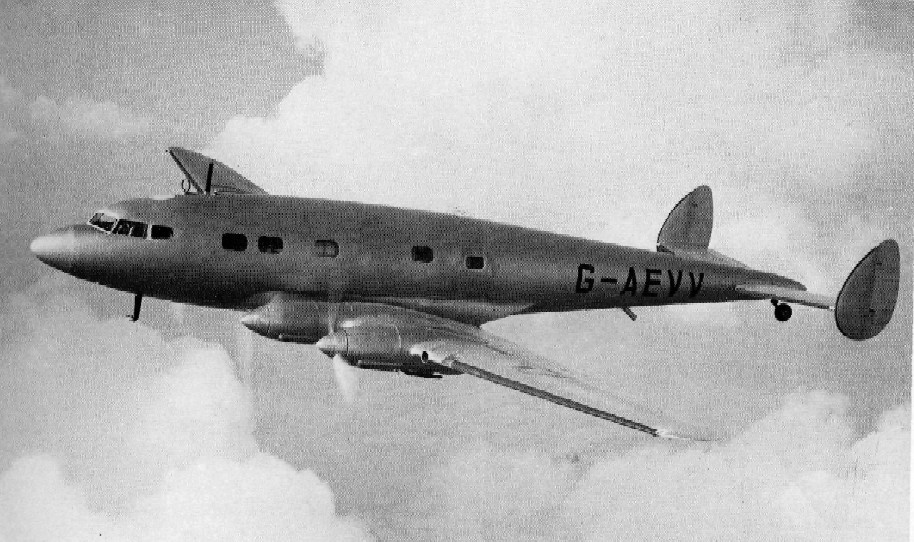
One of de Havilland's proposals was to adapt the de Havilland Albatross design to create a fast bomber.

Based on his experience with the Albatross, Geoffrey de Havilland believed that a bomber with a good aerodynamic design and smooth, minimal skin area, would exceed the P.13/36 specification. Furthermore, adapting the Albatross principles could save time. In April 1938, performance estimates were produced for a twin Rolls-Royce Merlin-powered DH.91, with the Bristol Hercules (radial engine) and Napier Sabre (H-engine) as alternatives. On 7 July 1938, de Havilland wrote to Air Marshal Wilfrid Freeman, the Air Council's member for Research and Development, discussing the specification and arguing that in war, shortages of aluminium and steel would occur, but supplies of wood-based products were "adequate". (Note: The situation had changed by October 1941, Connor cites a message that Britain was desperately short: "One of four airscrew factories has run out of imported veneers… veneers for air frame plywood would enable… construction to continue till December only… direct contact between Ministry of Supply experts and U.S.A. suppliers of aircraft veneers will be necessary for next three months. Otherwise essential war production… will be further curtailed." Wood construction used a different sector of workforce, and at the time, dH's experience was almost exclusively in the use of timber.) Although inferior in tension, the strength-to-weight ratio of wood is equal to or better than light alloys or steel, hence this approach was feasible. Lord Beaverbrook, Minister of Aircraft Production, nicknamed it "Freeman's Folly", alluding to Air Chief Marshal Sir Wilfrid Freeman, who defended Geoffrey de Havilland and his design concept against orders to scrap the project.

A follow-up letter to Freeman on 27 July said that the P.13/36 specification could not be met by a twin Merlin-powered aircraft and either the top speed or load capacity would be compromised, depending on which was paramount. For example, a larger, slower, turret-armed aircraft would have a range of 1,500 mi (2,400 km) carrying a 4,000 lb bomb load, with a maximum of 260 mph (420 km/h) at 19,000 ft (5,800 m), and a cruising speed of 230 mph (370 km/h) at 18,000 ft (5,500 m). De Havilland believed that a compromise, including eliminating surplus equipment, would improve matters. On 4 October 1938, de Havilland projected the performance of another design based on the Albatross, powered by two Merlin Xs, with a three-man crew and six or eight forward-firing guns, plus one or two manually operated guns and a tail turret. Based on a total loaded weight of 19,000 lb (8,600 kg), it would have a top speed of 300 mph (480 km/h) and cruising speed of 268 mph (431 km/h) at 22,500 ft (6,900 m).

Still believing this could be improved, and after examining more concepts based on the Albatross and the new all-metal DH.95 Flamingo, de Havilland settled on designing a new aircraft that would be aerodynamically clean, wooden, and powered by the Merlin, which offered substantial future development. The new design would be faster than foreseeable enemy fighter aircraft, and could dispense with defensive armament which would slow it and make interception or losses to anti-aircraft guns more likely. Instead, high speed and good manoeuvrability would make evading fighters and ground fire easier. The lack of turrets simplified production, reduced drag, and reduced production time, with a delivery rate far in advance of competing designs. Without armament, the crew could be reduced to a pilot and navigator. Whereas contemporary RAF design philosophy favoured well-armed heavy bombers, this mode of design was more akin to the German philosophy of the Schnellbomber. At a meeting in early October 1938 with Geoffrey de Havilland and Charles Walker (de Havilland's chief engineer), the Air Ministry showed little interest, and instead asked de Havilland to build wings for other bombers as a subcontractor.

By September 1939, de Havilland had produced preliminary estimates for single- and twin-engined variations of light-bomber designs using different engines, speculating on the effects of defensive armament on their designs. One design, completed on 6 September, was for an aircraft powered by a single 2,000 hp (1,500 kW) Napier Sabre, with a wingspan of 47 ft (14 m) and capable of carrying a 1,000 lb (450 kg) bomb load 1,500 mi (2,400 km). On 20 September, in another letter to Wilfrid Freeman, de Havilland wrote "…we believe that we could produce a twin-engine bomber which would have a performance so outstanding that little defensive equipment would be needed." By 4 October, work had progressed to a twin-engined light bomber with a wingspan of 51 ft (16 m) and powered by Merlin or Griffon engines, the Merlin favoured because of availability. On 7 October 1939, a month into the war, the nucleus of a design team under Eric Bishop moved to the security and secrecy of Salisbury Hall to work on what was later known as the DH.98. (Note: Bishop had worked on the DH.88 Comet and the Albatross under de Havilland's then-chief designer A. E. Hagg.) For more versatility, Bishop made provision for four 20 mm cannon in the forward half of the bomb bay, under the cockpit, firing via blast tubes and troughs under the fuselage.

The DH.98 was too radical for the ministry, which wanted a heavily armed, multi-role aircraft, combining medium bomber, reconnaissance, and general-purpose roles, that was also capable of carrying torpedoes. With the outbreak of war, the ministry became more receptive, but was still sceptical about an unarmed bomber. They thought the Germans would produce fighters that were faster than had been expected. and suggested the incorporation of two forward- and two rear-firing machine guns for defence. The ministry also opposed a two-man bomber, wanting at least a third crewman to reduce the work of the others on long flights. The Air Council added further requirements such as remotely controlled guns, a top speed of 275 mph (445 km/h) at 15,000 ft on two-thirds engine power, and a range of 3,000 mi (4,800 km) with a 4,000-lb bomb load. To appease the ministry, de Havilland built mock-ups with a gun turret just aft of the cockpit, but apart from this compromise, de Havilland made no changes.

On 12 November, at a meeting considering fast-bomber ideas put forward by de Havilland, Blackburn, and Bristol, Air Marshal Freeman directed de Havilland to produce a fast aircraft, powered initially by Merlin engines, with options of using progressively more powerful engines, including the Rolls-Royce Griffon and the Napier Sabre. Although estimates were presented for a slightly larger Griffon-powered aircraft, armed with a four-gun tail turret, Freeman got the requirement for defensive weapons dropped, and a draft requirement was raised calling for a high-speed, light-reconnaissance bomber capable of 400 mph (645 km/h) at 18,000 ft.

On 12 December, the Vice-Chief of the Air Staff, Director General of Research and Development, and the Air Officer Commanding-in-Chief (AOC-in-C) of RAF Bomber Command met to finalise the design and decide how to fit it into the RAF's aims. The AOC-in-C would not accept an unarmed bomber, but insisted on its suitability for reconnaissance missions with F8 or F24 cameras. After company representatives, the ministry, and the RAF's operational commands examined a full-scale mock-up at Hatfield on 29 December 1939, the project received backing. This was confirmed on 1 January 1940, when Freeman chaired a meeting with Geoffrey de Havilland, John Buchanan (Deputy of Aircraft Production), and John Connolly (Buchanan's chief of staff). De Havilland claimed the DH.98 was the "fastest bomber in the world… it must be useful". Freeman supported it for RAF service, ordering a single prototype for an unarmed bomber to specification B.1/40/dh, which called for a light bomber/reconnaissance aircraft powered by two 1,280 hp (950 kW) Rolls-Royce RM3SM (an early designation for the Merlin 21) with ducted radiators, capable of carrying a 1,000 lb (450 kg) bomb load. The aircraft was to have a speed of 400 mph (640 km/h) at 24,000 ft (7,300 m) and a cruising speed of 325 mph (525 km/h) at 26,500 ft (8,100 m) with a range of 1,500 mi (2,400 km) at 25,000 ft (7,600 m) on full tanks. Maximum service ceiling was to be 32,000 ft (9,800 m).

On 1 March 1940, Air Marshal Roderic Hill issued a contract under Specification B.1/40, for 50 bomber-reconnaissance variants of the DH.98; this contract included the prototype, which was given the factory serial E-0234. In May 1940, specification F.21/40 was issued, calling for a long-range fighter armed with four 20 mm cannon and four .303 machine guns in the nose, after which de Havilland was authorised to build a prototype of a fighter version of the DH.98. After debate, it was decided that this prototype, given the military serial number W4052, was to carry aircraft interception (AI) Mk IV radar equipment as both a day fighter and night fighter. (Note: The term radar, which originated in the USA, was not used by the British until later.) By June 1940, the DH.98 had been named "Mosquito". Having the fighter variant kept the Mosquito project alive, as doubts remained within the government and Air Ministry regarding the usefulness of an unarmed bomber, even after the prototype had shown its capabilities.

=== Project Mosquito ===
1943 advertisement for de Havilland taken from Flight & Aircraft Engineer magazine highlights the speed of the B Mk.IV.

With design of the DH.98 started, mock-ups were built, the most detailed at Salisbury Hall, where E-0234 was later constructed. Initially, the concept was for the crew to be enclosed in the fuselage behind a transparent nose (similar to the Bristol Blenheim or Heinkel He 111H), but this was quickly altered to a more solid nose with a conventional canopy.

Work was cancelled again after the evacuation of the British Army from France, when Lord Beaverbrook, as Minister of Aircraft Production, concentrating production on aircraft types for the defence of the UK decided no production capacity remained for aircraft like the DH.98, which was not expected to be in service until early 1942. Beaverbrook told Air Vice-Marshal Freeman that work on the project should stop, but he did not issue a specific instruction, and Freeman ignored the request. In June 1940, however, Lord Beaverbrook and the Air Staff ordered that production should concentrate on five existing types, namely the Supermarine Spitfire, Hawker Hurricane fighter, Vickers Wellington, Armstrong-Whitworth Whitley, and Bristol Blenheim bombers. Work on the DH.98 prototype stopped. Apparently, the project shut down when the design team were denied materials for the prototype.

The Mosquito was reinstated as a priority in July 1940, after de Havilland's general manager, L.C.L. Murray, promised Lord Beaverbrook 50 Mosquitoes by December 1941. This was only after Beaverbrook was satisfied that Mosquito production would not hinder de Havilland's primary work of producing Tiger Moth and Airspeed Oxford trainers, repairing Hurricanes, and manufacturing Merlin engines under licence. In promising Beaverbrook such a number by the end of 1941, de Havilland was taking a gamble, because they were unlikely to be built in such a limited time. As it transpired, only 20 aircraft were built in 1941, but the other 30 were delivered by mid-March 1942. During the Battle of Britain, interruptions to production due to air raid warnings caused nearly a third of de Havilland's factory time to be lost. Nevertheless, work on the prototype went ahead quickly at Salisbury Hall since E-0234 was completed by November 1940.

In the aftermath of the Battle of Britain, the original order was changed to 20 bomber variants and 30 fighters. Whether the fighter version should have dual or single controls, or should carry a turret, was still uncertain, so three prototypes were built: W4052, W4053, and W4073. The second and third, both turret armed, were later disarmed, to become the prototypes for the T.III trainer. This caused some delays, since half-built wing components had to be strengthened for the required higher combat loading. The nose sections also had to be changed from a design with a clear perspex bomb-aimer's position, to one with a solid nose housing four .303 machine guns and their ammunition.

=== Prototypes and test flights ===
On 3 November 1940, the prototype aircraft, painted in "prototype yellow" and still coded E-0234, was dismantled, transported by road to Hatfield and placed in a small, blast-proof assembly building. Two Merlin 21 two-speed, single-stage supercharged engines were installed, driving three-bladed de Havilland Hydromatic constant-speed controllable-pitch propellers. Engine runs were made on 19 November. On 24 November, taxiing trials were carried out by Geoffrey de Havilland Jr., the de Havilland test pilot. On 25 November, the aircraft made its first flight, piloted by de Havilland Jr., accompanied by John E. Walker, the chief engine installation designer. (Note: This first flight was made only 11 months after the start of detailed design work.)

For this maiden flight, E-0234, weighing 14,150 lb (6,420 kg), took off from the grass airstrip at Hatfield. The takeoff was reported as "straightforward and easy" and the undercarriage was not retracted until a considerable altitude was attained. The aircraft reached 220 mph (355 km/h), with the only problem being the undercarriage doors, which were operated by bungee cords attached to the main undercarriage legs, and remained open by some 12 in (300 mm) at that speed. This problem persisted for some time. The left wing of E-0234 also had a tendency to drag slightly to port, so a slight change in the angle of the wing was carried out before further flights. (Note: E-0234 had a wingspan of 52 ft 2 in (15.90 m) and was the only Mosquito to be built with Handley Page slats on the outer leading edges of the wings. Test flights showed that these were not needed and they were disconnected and faired over with doped fabric (these slats can still be seen on W4050).)

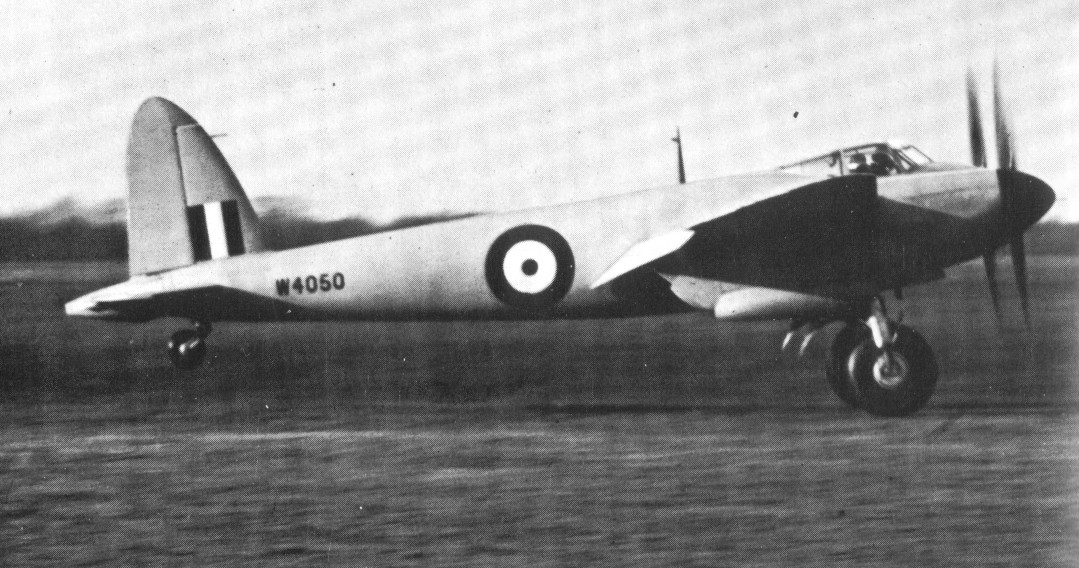
Mosquito prototype W4050 landing after a test flight on 10 January 1941: Four test flights were flown that day.

On 5 December 1940, the prototype, with the military serial number W4050, experienced tail buffeting at speeds between 240 and 255 mph (385 and 410 km/h). The pilot noticed this most in the control column, with handling becoming more difficult. During testing on 10 December, wool tufts were attached to suspect areas to investigate the direction of airflow. The conclusion was that the airflow separating from the rear section of the inner engine nacelles was disturbed, leading to a localised stall and the disturbed airflow was striking the tailplane, causing buffeting. To smooth the air flow and deflect it from forcefully striking the tailplane, nonretractable slots fitted to the inner engine nacelles and to the leading edge of the tailplane were tested. These slots and wing-root fairings fitted to the forward fuselage and leading edge of the radiator intakes stopped some of the vibration experienced, but did not cure the tailplane buffeting.

In February 1941, buffeting was eliminated by incorporating triangular fillets on the trailing edge of the wings and lengthening the nacelles, the trailing edge of which curved up to fair into the fillet some 10 in (250 mm) behind the wing's trailing edge; this meant the flaps had to be divided into inboard and outboard sections. (Note: On W4050, the nacelle extensions were not as long as those fitted to production Mosquitoes; nacelles of the definitive shape and length were first fitted to the fighter prototype W4052. The extended nacelles and fillets were not fitted to the first nine PR Mk Is, some of which were converted to B Mk IV series 1 bombers.) With the buffeting problems largely resolved, John Cunningham flew W4050 on 9 February 1941. He was greatly impressed by the "lightness of the controls and generally pleasant handling characteristics". Cunningham concluded that when the type was fitted with aircraft interception equipment (AI), it might replace the Bristol Beaufighter night fighter.

During its trials on 16 January 1941, W4050 outpaced a Spitfire at 6,000 ft (1,800 m). The original estimates were that as the Mosquito prototype had twice the surface area and over twice the weight of the Spitfire Mk.II, but also had twice its power, the Mosquito would be 20 mph (30 km/h) faster. Over the next few months, W4050 surpassed this estimate, easily beating the Spitfire Mk.II in tests at RAF Boscombe Down in Wiltshire in February 1941, reaching a top speed of 392 mph (631 km/h) at 22,000 ft (6,700 m), compared to a top speed of 360 mph (580 km/h) at 19,500 ft (5,900 m) for the Spitfire.

On 19 February, official trials began at the Aeroplane and Armament Experimental Establishment (AAEE) based at Boscombe Down, although the de Havilland representative was surprised by a delay in starting the tests. On 24 February, as W4050 taxied across the rough airfield, the tailwheel jammed leading to the fuselage fracturing. Repairs were made by early March, using part of the fuselage of the photo-reconnaissance prototype W4051. (Note: This accident occurred because the tailwheel unit was unable to caster properly, a problem solved in June–July 1941 by fitting a Dowty unit.) In spite of this setback, the Initial Handling Report 767 issued by the AAEE stated, "The aeroplane is pleasant to fly… aileron control light and effective ..." The maximum speed reached was 388 mph (624 km/h) at 22,000 ft (6,700 m), with an estimated maximum ceiling of 34,000 ft (10,000 m) and a maximum rate of climb of 2,880 ft/min (880 m/min) at 11,500 ft (3,500 m).

W4050 continued to be used for various test programmes, as the experimental "workhorse" for the Mosquito family. In late October 1941, it returned to the factory to be fitted with Merlin 61s, the first production Merlins fitted with a two-speed, two-stage supercharger. The first flight with the new engines was on 20 June 1942. W4050 recorded a maximum speed of 428 mph (689 km/h) at 28,500 ft (8,700 m) (fitted with straight-through air intakes with snow guards, engines in full supercharger gear) and 437 mph (703 km/h) at 29,200 ft (8,900 m) without snow guards. (Note: Snowguards were small, oval grids of steel mesh attached in front of the opening of the carburettor air intakes. They were designed to stop ice forming in the mouth of the intake when the aircraft operated in cold weather, or flew in the cold temperatures at high altitude.) In October 1942, in connection with development work on the NF Mk.XV, W4050 was fitted with extended wingtips, increasing the span to 59 ft 2 in (18.03 m), first flying in this configuration on 8 December. Fitted with high-altitude-rated, two-stage, two-speed Merlin 77s, it reached 439 mph (707 km/h) in December 1943. Soon after these flights, W4050 was grounded and scheduled to be scrapped, but instead served as an instructional airframe at Hatfield. In September 1958, W4050 was returned to the Salisbury Hall hangar where it was built, restored to its original configuration, and became one of the primary exhibits of the de Havilland Aircraft Heritage Centre.

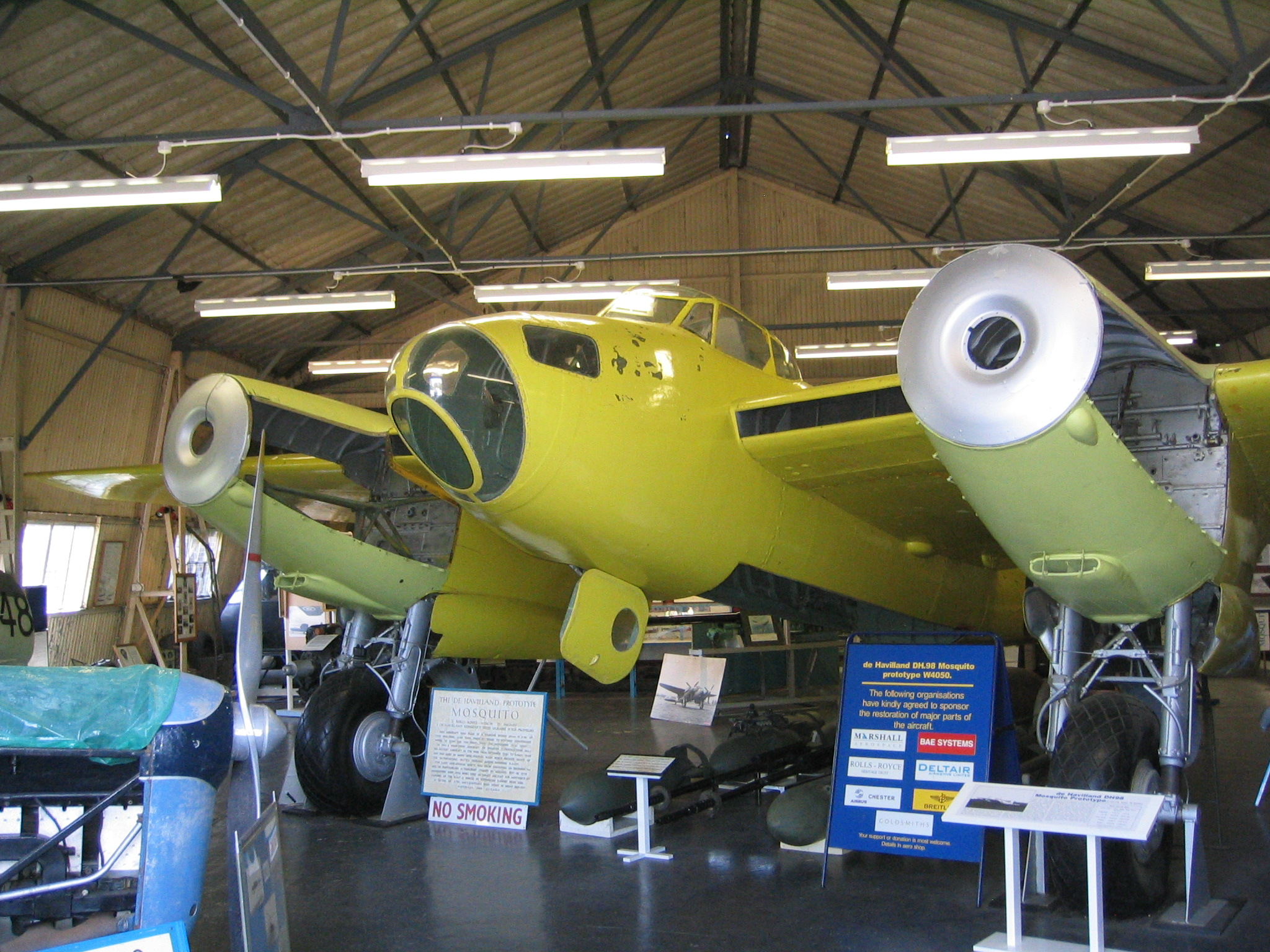
W4050 being restored at the de Havilland Aircraft Heritage Centre near St Albans

W4051, which was designed from the outset to be the prototype for the photo-reconnaissance versions of the Mosquito, was slated to make its first flight in early 1941. However, the fuselage fracture in W4050 meant that W4051's fuselage was used as a replacement; W4051 was then rebuilt using a production standard fuselage and first flew on 10 June 1941. This prototype continued to use the short engine nacelles, single-piece trailing-edge flaps, and the 19 ft 5.5 in (5.931 m) "No. 1" tailplane used by W4050, but had production-standard 54 ft 2 in (16.51 m) wings and became the only Mosquito prototype to fly operationally. That was with No1 Photographic Reconnaissance Unit.

Construction of the fighter prototype, W4052, was also carried out at Salisbury Hall. It was powered by 1,460 hp (1,090 kW) Merlin 21s, and had an altered canopy structure with a flat, bullet-proof windscreen; the solid nose had mounted four .303 British Browning machine guns and their ammunition boxes, accessible by a large, sideways hinged panel. Four 20-mm Hispano Mk.II cannon were housed in a compartment under the cockpit floor with the breeches projecting into the bomb bay and the automatic bomb bay doors were replaced by manually operated bay doors, which incorporated cartridge ejector chutes.

As a day and night fighter, prototype W4052 was equipped with AI Mk IV equipment, complete with an "arrowhead" transmission aerial mounted between the central Brownings and receiving aerials through the outer wing tips, and it was painted in black RDM2a "Special Night" finish. (Note: The RDM2a finish was notoriously rough and hard to maintain; tests later proved that it could cut the top speed of a Mosquito by up to 26 mph (42 km/h), and by March 1942 it was replaced by the black "Night Type S" (smooth) finish.) It was also the first prototype constructed with the extended engine nacelles. W4052 was later tested with other modifications, including bomb racks, drop tanks, barrage balloon cable cutters in the leading edge of the wings, Hamilton airscrews and braking propellers, and drooping aileron systems that enabled steep approaches and a larger rudder tab. It continued to serve as a test machine until it was scrapped on 28 January 1946. 4055 flew the first operational Mosquito flight on 17 September 1941.

During flight testing, the Mosquito prototypes were modified to test a number of configurations. W4050 was fitted with a turret behind the cockpit for drag tests, after which the idea was abandoned in July 1941. W4052 had the first version of the Youngman Frill airbrake fitted to the fighter prototype. The frill was mounted around the fuselage behind the wing and was opened by bellows and venturi effect to provide rapid deceleration during interceptions and was tested between January and August 1942, but was also abandoned when lowering the undercarriage was found to have the same effect with less buffeting.

=== Production plans and American interest ===
The Air Ministry authorised mass production plans on 21 June 1941, by which time the Mosquito had become one of the world's fastest operational aircraft. It ordered 19 photo-reconnaissance (PR) models and 176 fighters. A further 50 were unspecified; in July 1941, these were confirmed to be unarmed fast bombers. By the end of January 1942, contracts had been awarded for 1,378 Mosquitoes of all variants, including 20 T.III trainers and 334 FB.VI bombers. Another 400 were to be built by de Havilland Canada.

On 20 April 1941, W4050 was demonstrated to Lord Beaverbrook, the Minister of Aircraft Production. The Mosquito made a series of flights, including one rolling climb on one engine. Also present were US General Henry H. Arnold and his aide Major Elwood Quesada, who wrote "I… recall the first time I saw the Mosquito as being impressed by its performance, which we were aware of. We were impressed by the appearance of the airplane that looks fast usually is fast, and the Mosquito was, by the standards of the time, an extremely well-streamlined airplane, and it was highly regarded, highly respected."

The trials set up future production plans between Britain, Australia, and Canada. Six days later, Arnold returned to America with a full set of manufacturer's drawings. As a result of his report, five companies (Beech, Curtiss-Wright, Fairchild, Fleetwings, and Hughes) were asked to evaluate the de Havilland data. The report by Beech Aircraft summed up the general view: "It appears as though this airplane has sacrificed serviceability, structural strength, ease of construction and flying characteristics in an attempt to use construction material which is not suitable for the manufacture of efficient airplanes." The Americans did not pursue the proposal for licensed production, the consensus arguing that the Lockheed P-38 Lightning could fulfill the same duties. However, Arnold urged the United States Army Air Forces (USAAF) to evaluate the design even if they would not adopt it. On 12 December 1941, after the attack on Pearl Harbor, the USAAF requested one airframe for this purpose.

== Design and manufacture ==
=== Overview ===
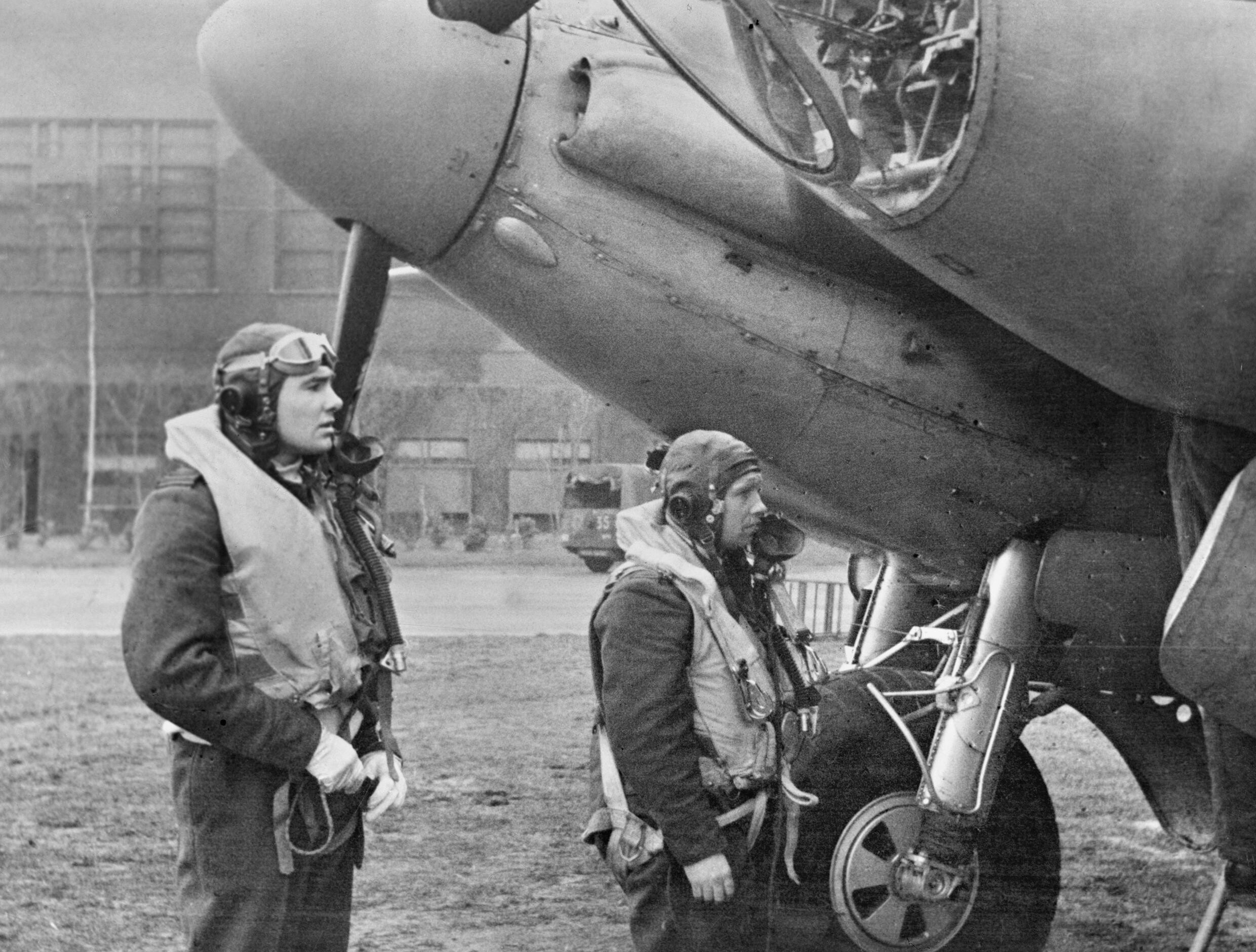
B Mk.IV nose closeup showing bombsight, clear nose, engine nacelles and undercarriage

While timber construction for aircraft was considered outmoded by some, de Havilland claimed that their successes with techniques used for the DH 91 Albatross could lead to a fast, light bomber using monocoque-sandwich shell construction. Arguments in favour of this included speed of prototyping, rapid development, minimisation of jig-building time, and employment of a separate category of workforce; many production facilities and skilled carpenters that previously manufactured furniture were repurposed to create components for the Mosquito, leveraging an existing workforce whose expertise was generally not being utilised during the war effort.

The ply-balsa-ply monocoque fuselage and one-piece wings with doped fabric covering would give excellent aerodynamic performance and low weight, combined with strength and stiffness. At the same time, the design team had to fight conservative Air Ministry views on defensive armament. Guns and gun turrets, favoured by the ministry, would impair the aircraft's aerodynamic properties and reduce speed and manoeuvrability, in the opinion of the designers. While submitting these arguments, Geoffrey de Havilland funded his private venture until a very late stage. The project was a success beyond all expectations.

As a multi-role warplane, the Mosquito came in multiple versions: photo-reconnaissance (PR), bomber (B), fighter (F), night fighter (NF), fighter-bomber (FB), torpedo bomber (TR) with fold-up wings to fit more on a carrier, and trainer (T), each with varying modifications and weapon loadouts. Typical gun armament was four .303 caliber Browning machine guns and four 20 mm Hispano autocannons. Bomb load could be up to 4,000 lb (1,800 kg), allowing the Mosquito to carry a single "Cookie" blockbuster bomb, or a number of smaller ones.

The most-produced variant, designated the FB Mk. VI (Fighter-bomber Mark 6), was powered by two Merlin Mk.23 or Mk.25 engines driving three-bladed de Havilland hydromatic propellers. The typical fixed armament for an FB Mk. VI was four Browning .303 machine guns and four 20-mm Hispano cannons, while the offensive load consisted of up to 2,000 lb (910 kg) of bombs, or eight RP-3 unguided rockets.

=== Performance ===
The aircraft had light and effective control surfaces that provided good manoeuvrability, but its rudder could not be used aggressively at high speeds. Poor aileron control at low speeds when landing and taking off was also a problem for inexperienced crews. For flying at low speeds, the flaps had to be set at 15°, speed reduced to 200 mph (320 km/h), and rpm set to 2,650. The speed could be reduced to an acceptable 150 mph (240 km/h) for low-speed flying. For cruising, the optimum speed for obtaining maximum range was 200 mph (320 km/h) at 17,000 lb (7,700 kg) weight.

The Mosquito had a high stalling speed of 120 mph (190 km/h) with undercarriage and flaps raised. When both were lowered, the stalling speed decreased from 120 to 100 mph (190 to 160 km/h). Stall speed at normal approach angle and conditions was 100 to 110 mph (160 to 180 km/h). Warning of the stall was given by buffeting and would occur 12 mph (19 km/h) before stall was reached. The conditions and impact of the stall were not severe. The wing would only drop if the control column was pulled back. The nose drooped gently and recovery was easy.

Early in the Mosquito's operational life, the intake shrouds that were to cool the exhausts overheated. Flame dampers prevented exhaust glow on night operations, but reduced performance. Multiple ejector and open-ended exhaust stubs helped solve the problem and were used in the PR.VIII, B.IX, and B.XVI variants. This increased speed in the B.IX by 10 to 13 mph (16 to 21 km/h).

=== Fuselage ===
The oval-section fuselage was a frameless monocoque shell built in two vertically separate halves formed over a mahogany or concrete mould. (Note: Both types of moulds were used, at certain times and in different factories.) Pressure was applied with band clamps. Some of the 1/2—3/4" shell sandwich skins comprised 3/32" birch three-ply outers, with 7/16" cores of Ecuadorean balsa. (Note: This was specially graded for density to a mean of 9 lb. per cu. ft., since this species is highly variable and the cores comprised a significant proportion of the total weight.) In many generally smaller but vital areas, such as around apertures and attachment zones, stronger timbers, including aircraft-quality spruce, replaced the balsa core. The main areas of the sandwich skin were only 0.55 in (14 mm) thick. Together with various forms of wood reinforcement, often of laminated construction, the sandwich skin gave great stiffness and torsional resistance. The separate fuselage halves speeded construction, permitting access by personnel working in parallel with others, as the work progressed.

Work on the separate half-fuselages included installation of control mechanisms and cabling. Screwed inserts into the inner skins that would be under stress in service were reinforced using round shear plates made from a fabric-Bakelite composite.

Transverse bulkheads were also compositely built-up with several species of timber, plywood, and balsa. Seven vertically halved bulkheads were installed within each moulded fuselage shell before the main "boxing up" operation. Bulkhead number seven was especially strongly built, since it carried the fitments and transmitted the aerodynamic loadings for the tailplane and rudder. (Note: The bulkhead was a complex construction; see the Aviation article for diagrams. Bulkhead 7 used special four-ply birch with 45° layup, and some additional strengthening using walnut wood.) The fuselage had a large ventral section cut-out, strongly reinforced, that allowed the fuselage to be lowered onto the wing centre-section at a later stage of assembly.

For early production aircraft, the structural assembly adhesive was casein-based. At a later stage, this was replaced by "Aerolite", a synthetic urea-formaldehyde type, which was more durable. (Note: Aerolite was developed by Norman de Bruyne at Aero Research Limited (ARL) The de Havilland company also pioneered the use of radio-frequency heating to accelerate curing of the adhesive.) To provide for the edge joints for the fuselage halves, zones near the outer edges of the shells had their balsa sandwich cores replaced by much stronger inner laminations of birch plywood. For the bonding together of the two halves ("boxing up"), a longitudinal cut was machined into these edges. The profile of this cut was a form of V-groove. Part of the edge bonding process also included adding further longitudinal plywood lap strips on the outside of the shells. The half bulkheads of each shell were bonded to their corresponding pair in a similar way. Two laminated wooden clamps were used in the after portion of the fuselage to provide supports during this complex gluing work. The resulting large structural components had to be kept completely still and held in the correct environment until the glue cured.

For finishing, a covering of doped madapollam (a fine, plain-woven cotton) fabric was stretched tightly over the shell and several coats of red, followed by silver dope, were added, followed by the final camouflage paint.

=== Wing ===
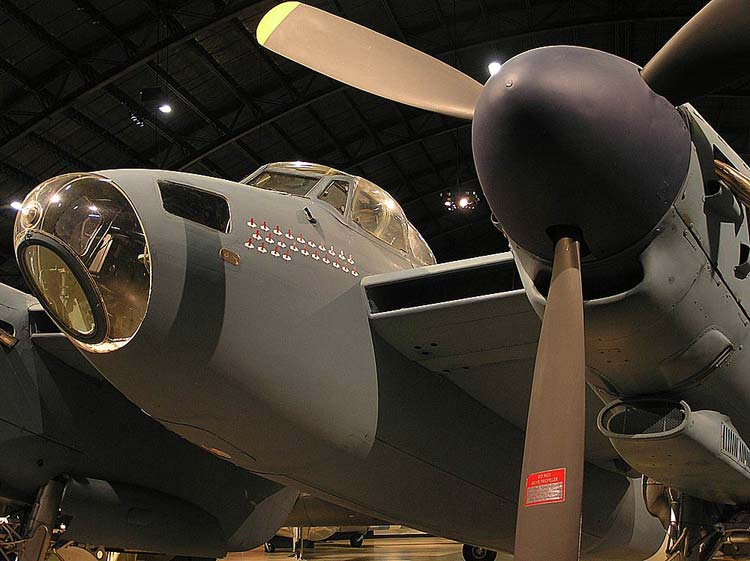
A preserved Mosquito at the U.S. Air Force Museum (former TT Mk.35 which was restored to B Mk.XVI configuration). Note the air and oil coolant radiators in the leading edge of the wing, intake for the two-stage Merlin's intercooler radiator behind the propeller blade, and the carburettor intake with ice guard behind and below.

The all-wood wing pairs formed a single structural unit throughout the wingspan, with no central longitudinal joint. Instead, the spars ran from wingtip to wingtip. There was a single continuous main spar and another continuous rear spar. Because of the combination of dihedral with the forward sweep of the trailing edges of the wings, this rear spar was one of the most complex units to laminate and to finish machining after the bonding and curing. It had to produce the correct 3D tilt in each of two planes. Also, it was designed and made to taper from the wing roots towards the wingtips. Both principal spars were of ply box construction, using in general 0.25-in plywood webs with laminated spruce flanges, plus a number of additional reinforcements and special details.

Spruce and plywood ribs were connected with gusset joints. Some heavy-duty ribs contained pieces of ash and walnut, as well as the special five ply that included veneers laid up at 45°. The upper skin construction was in two layers of 0.25-in five-ply birch, separated by Douglas fir stringers running in the span-wise direction. The wings were covered with madapollam fabric and doped in a similar manner to the fuselage. The wing was installed into the roots by means of four large attachment points. The engine radiators were fitted in the inner wing, just outboard of the fuselage on either side. These gave less drag. The radiators themselves were split into three sections: an oil cooler section outboard, the middle section forming the coolant radiator and the inboard section serving the cabin heater.

The wing contained metal-framed and -skinned ailerons, but the flaps were made of wood and were hydraulically controlled. The nacelles were mostly wood, although for strength, the engine mounts were all metal, as were the undercarriage parts. Engine mounts of welded steel tube were added, along with simple landing gear oleos filled with rubber blocks. Wood was used to carry only in-plane loads, with metal fittings used for all triaxially loaded components such as landing gear, engine mounts, control-surface mounting brackets, and the wing-to-fuselage junction. The outer leading wing edge had to be brought 22 in (56 cm) further forward to accommodate this design. The main tail unit was all wood built. The control surfaces, the rudder, and elevator were aluminium-framed and fabric-covered. The total weight of metal castings and forgings used in the aircraft was only 280 lb (130 kg).

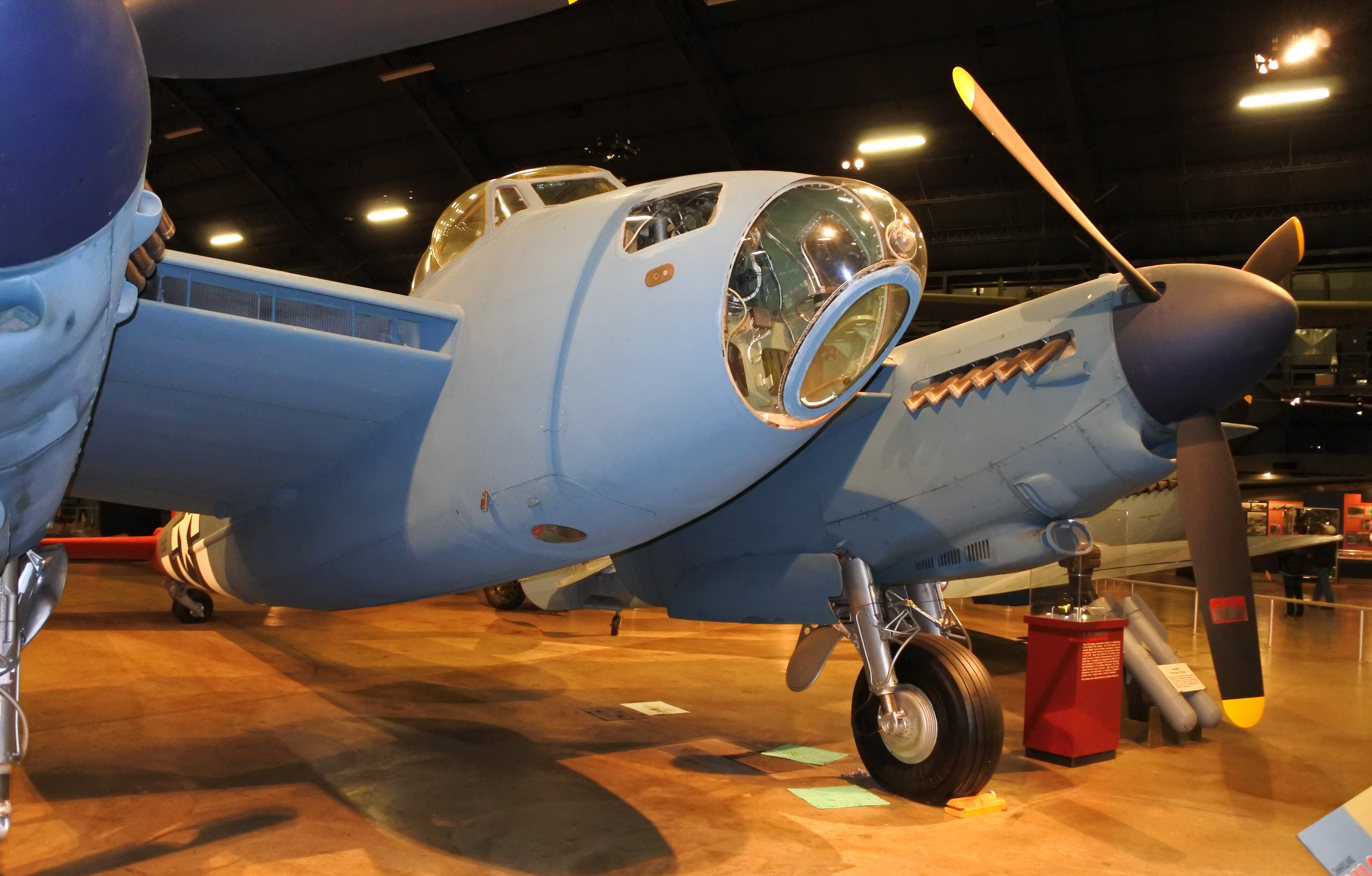
American F-8 Mosquito nose; USAAF markings, PRU Blue finish at the National Museum of the United States Air Force.

In November 1944, several crashes occurred in the Far East. At first, these were thought to be a result of wing-structure failures. The casein glue, it was said, cracked when exposed to extreme heat and/or monsoon conditions. This caused the upper surfaces to lift from the main spar. An investigating team led by Major Hereward de Havilland travelled to India and produced a report in early December 1944 stating, "the accidents were not caused by the deterioration of the glue, but by shrinkage of the airframe during the wet monsoon season". (Note: Many sources repeat the account of the change from casein adhesive to urea formaldehyde adhesive. These nearly always fail to recognise that both types, in the form used, were close-assembly adhesives, employed to bond the air-frame components together, often using the technique of "screw-gluing". Plywood manufacture, on the other hand, used "WBP- water and boil-proof" (obsolescent BSI term), or ASTM equivalent, right from the start. Most of the adhesives failures in the tropics were due to water penetration into the interior cavities and balsa cores, with consequent swelling-shrinkage cycling. There were warnings, probably ignored in "the exigencies" that aircraft should never be parked permanently in the open. DH had always recognised that casein assembly adhesive was unsuitable for Mosquitoes entering Far East service. Bonding additional cover strips over some of the major joints e.g. wing leading edges to main spars, was a stop-gap measure taken by DH Australia.) However, a later inquiry by Cabot & Myers firmly attributed the accidents to faulty manufacture and this was confirmed by a further investigation team by the Ministry of Aircraft Production at Defford, which found faults in six Mosquito marks (all built at de Havilland's Hatfield and Leavesden plants). The defects were similar, and none of the aircraft had been exposed to monsoon conditions or termite attack.

The investigators concluded that construction defects occurred at the two plants. They found that the "…standard of glueing… left much to be desired." Records at the time showed that accidents caused by "loss of control" were three times more frequent on Mosquitoes than on any other type of aircraft. The Air Ministry forestalled any loss of confidence in the Mosquito by holding to Major de Havilland's initial investigation in India that the accidents were caused "largely by climate". To solve the problem of seepage into the interior, a strip of plywood was set along the span of the wing to seal the entire length of the skin joint.

=== Systems ===
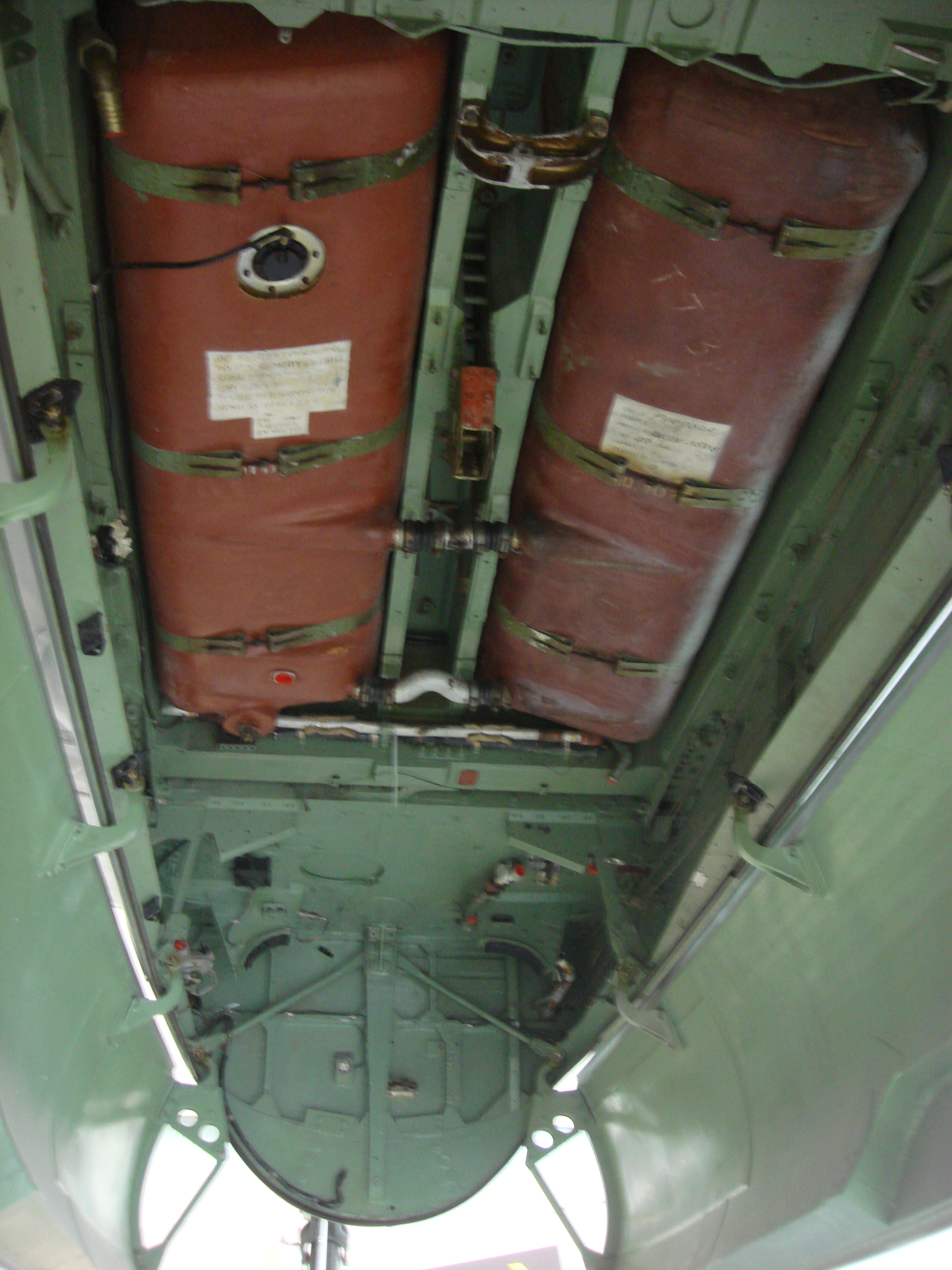
A view into the bomb bay showing the brick-red coloured twin fuel tanks fitted into the fuselage

The fuel systems gave the Mosquito good range and endurance, using up to nine fuel tanks. Two outer wing tanks each contained 58 imp gal (70 US gal; 260 L) of fuel. These were complemented by two inner wing fuel tanks, each containing 143 imp gal (172 US gal; 650 L), located between the wing root and engine nacelle. In the central fuselage were twin fuel tanks mounted between bulkhead number two and three aft of the cockpit. In the FB.VI, these tanks contained 25 imp gal (30 US gal; 110 L) each, while in the B.IV and other unarmed Mosquitoes each of the two centre tanks contained 68 imp gal (82 US gal; 310 L). Both the inner wing, and fuselage tanks are listed as the "main tanks" and the total internal fuel load of 452 imp gal (545 US gal; 2,055 L) was initially deemed appropriate for the type. In addition, the FB Mk. VI could have larger fuselage tanks, increasing the capacity to 63 imp gal (76 US gal; 290 L). Drop tanks of 50 imp gal (60 US gal; 230 L) or 100 imp gal (120 US gal; 450 L) could be mounted under each wing, increasing the total fuel load to 615 or 715 imp gal (739 or 859 US gal; 2,800 or 3,250 L).

The design of the Mk.VI allowed for a provisional long-range fuel tank to increase range for action over enemy territory, for the installation of bomb release equipment specific to depth charges for strikes against enemy shipping, or for the simultaneous use of rocket projectiles along with a 100 imp gal (120 US gal; 450 L) drop tank under each wing supplementing the main fuel cells. The FB.VI had a wingspan of 54 ft 2 in (16.51 m), a length (over guns) of 41 ft 2 in (12.55 m). It had a maximum speed of 378 mph (608 km/h) at 13,200 ft (4,000 m). Maximum take-off weight was 22,300 lb (10,100 kg) and the range of the aircraft was 1,120 mi (1,800 km) with a service ceiling of 26,000 ft (7,900 m).

To reduce fuel vaporisation at the high altitudes of photographic reconnaissance variants, the central and inner wing tanks were pressurised. The pressure venting cock located behind the pilot's seat controlled the pressure valve. As the altitude increased, the valve increased the volume applied by a pump. This system was extended to include field modifications of the fuel tank system.

The engine oil tanks were in the engine nacelles. Each nacelle contained a 15 imp gal (18 US gal; 68 L) oil tank, including a 2.5 imp gal (3.0 US gal; 11 L) air space. The oil tanks themselves had no separate coolant controlling systems. The coolant header tank was in the forward nacelle, behind the propeller. The remaining coolant systems were controlled by the coolant radiators shutters in the forward inner wing compartment, between the nacelle and the fuselage and behind the main engine cooling radiators, which were fitted in the leading edge. Electric-pneumatic operated radiator shutters directed and controlled airflow through the ducts and into the coolant valves, to predetermined temperatures.

Electrical power came from a 24 volt DC generator on the starboard (No. 2) engine and an alternator on the port engine, which also supplied AC power for radios. The radiator shutters, supercharger gear change, gun camera, bomb bay, bomb/rocket release and all the other crew controlled instruments were powered by a 24 V battery. The radio communication devices included VHF and HF communications, GEE navigation, and IFF and G.P. devices. The electric generators also powered the fire extinguishers. Located on the starboard side of the cockpit, the switches would operate automatically in the event of a crash. In flight, a warning light would flash to indicate a fire, should the pilot not already be aware of it. In later models, to save liquids and engine clean up time in case of belly landing, the fire extinguisher was changed to semi-automatic triggers.

The main landing gear, housed in the nacelles behind the engines, were raised and lowered hydraulically. The main landing gear shock absorbers were de Havilland manufactured and used a system of rubber in compression, rather than hydraulic oleos, with twin pneumatic brakes for each wheel. The Dunlop-Marstrand anti-shimmy tailwheel was also retractable.

== Operational history ==
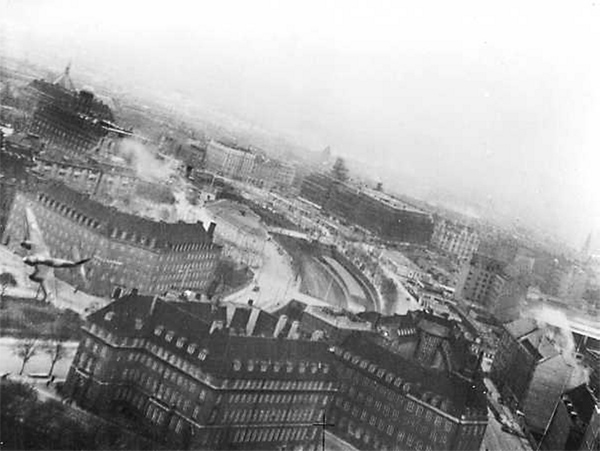
Bombing of the Gestapo headquarters in the Shellhus, Copenhagen, Denmark, in March 1945. A Mosquito pulling away from its bombing run is visible on the extreme left, centre.

The de Havilland Mosquito operated in many roles, performing medium bomber, reconnaissance, tactical strike, anti-submarine warfare, shipping attacks and night fighter duties, until the end of the war. On 13 July 1941, the first production PR Mosquito W4051 (a production fuselage combined with some prototype flying surfaces – see Prototypes and test flights) was sent to No. 1 Photographic Reconnaissance Unit (PRU), at RAF Benson. The secret reconnaissance flights of this aircraft were the first operational missions of the Mosquito. In 1944, the journal Flight gave 19 September 1941 as date of the first PR mission, at an altitude "of some 20,000 ft".

On 15 November 1941, 105 Squadron, RAF, took delivery at RAF Swanton Morley, Norfolk, of the first operational Mosquito Mk. B.IV bomber, serial no. W4064. Throughout 1942, 105 Squadron, based next at RAF Horsham St. Faith, then from 29 September, RAF Marham, undertook daylight low-level and shallow dive attacks. (Note: The main author of "Low Attack", John de L. Wooldridge, became Wing Commander of No. 105 Squadron in March 1943. First published in 1944, it is a valuable contemporary first-hand account of the daylight low-level, pinpoint raiding phase of the Mosquito operations. The book's frontispiece is a map showing eighteen towns and cities in whose regions the attacks took place – several of these had more than one visit by the squadrons. It contains a commendation of the skill and high courage of the aircrews by Air Chief Marshal Sir Arthur Harris, referring to attacks on targets of first importance to the German war effort. This was at a time when the massed heavy night bomber raids were not yet fully mobilised.) Apart from the Oslo and Berlin raids, the strikes were mainly on industrial and infrastructure targets in occupied Netherlands and Norway, France and northern and western Germany. The crews faced deadly flak and fighters, particularly Focke-Wulf Fw 190s, which they called snappers. Germany still controlled continental airspace and the Fw 190s were often already airborne and at an advantageous altitude. Collisions within the formations also caused casualties. It was the Mosquito's excellent handling capabilities, rather than pure speed, that facilitated successful evasions.

The Mosquito was first announced publicly on 26 September 1942 after the Oslo Mosquito raid of 25 September. It was featured in The Times on 28 September and the next day the newspaper published two captioned photographs illustrating the bomb strikes and damage. On 6 December 1942, Mosquitoes from Nos. 105 and 139 Squadrons made up part of the bomber force used in Operation Oyster, the large No. 2 Group raid against the Philips works at Eindhoven.

From mid-1942 to mid-1943, Mosquito bombers flew high-speed, medium and low-altitude daylight missions against factories, railways and other pinpoint targets in Germany and German-occupied Europe. From June 1943, Mosquito bombers were formed into the Light Night Striking Force to guide RAF Bomber Command heavy bomber raids and as "nuisance" bombers, dropping Blockbuster bombs – 4,000 lb (1,800 kg) "cookies" – in high-altitude, high-speed raids that German night fighters were almost powerless to intercept.

As a night fighter from mid-1942, the Mosquito intercepted Luftwaffe raids on Britain, notably those of Operation Steinbock in 1944. Starting in July 1942, Mosquito night-fighter units raided Luftwaffe airfields. As part of 100 Group, it was flown as a night fighter and as an intruder supporting Bomber Command heavy bombers that reduced losses during 1944 and 1945. (Note: The Mosquito increased German night-fighter losses to such an extent the Germans were said to have awarded two victories for shooting one down.)

The Mosquito fighter-bomber served as a strike aircraft in the Second Tactical Air Force (2TAF) from its inception on 1 June 1943. The main objective was to prepare for the invasion of occupied Europe a year later. In Operation Overlord three Mosquito FB Mk. VI wings flew close air support for the Allied armies in co-operation with other RAF units equipped with the North American B-25 Mitchell medium bomber. In the months between the foundation of 2TAF and its duties from D day onwards, vital training was interspersed with attacks on V-1 flying bomb launch sites.

In another example of the daylight precision raids carried out by the Mosquitoes of Nos. 105 and 139 Squadrons, on 30 January 1943, the 10th anniversary of the Nazis' seizure of power, a morning Mosquito attack knocked out the main Berlin broadcasting station while Luftwaffe Chief Reichsmarschall Hermann Göring was speaking, putting his speech off the air. A second sortie in the afternoon inconvenienced another speech, by Propaganda Minister Joseph Goebbels. Lecturing a group of German aircraft manufacturers, Göring said:

In 1940 I could at least fly as far as Glasgow in most of my aircraft, but not now! It makes me furious when I see the Mosquito. I turn green and yellow with envy. The British, who can afford aluminium better than we can, knock together a beautiful wooden aircraft that every piano factory over there is building, and they give it a speed which they have now increased yet again. What do you make of that? There is nothing the British do not have. They have the geniuses and we have the nincompoops. After the war is over I'm going to buy a British radio set – then at least I'll own something that has always worked.

During this daylight-raiding phase, Nos. 105 and 139 Squadrons flew 139 combat operations and aircrew losses were high. Even the losses incurred in the squadrons' dangerous Blenheim era were exceeded in percentage terms. The Roll of Honour shows 51 aircrew deaths from the end of May 1942 to April 1943. In the corresponding period, crews gained three Mentions in Despatches, two DFMs and three DFCs. The low-level daylight attacks finished on 27 May 1943 with strikes on the Schott glass and Zeiss instrument works, both in Jena. Subsequently, when low-level precision attacks required Mosquitoes, they were allotted to squadrons operating the FB.IV version. Examples include the Aarhus air raid and Operation Jericho.

Since the beginning of the year, the German fighter force had become seriously overstretched. In April 1943, in response to "political humiliation" caused by the Mosquito, Göring ordered the formation of special Luftwaffe units (Jagdgeschwader 25, commanded by Oberstleutnant Herbert Ihlefeld and Jagdgeschwader 50, under Major Hermann Graf) to combat the Mosquito attacks, though these units, which were "little more than glorified squadrons", were unsuccessful against the elusive RAF aircraft. Post-war German histories also indicate that there was a belief within the Luftwaffe that Mosquito aircraft "gave only a weak radar signal." (Note: The "weak radar signal" comment by Boog applies to all Mosquito roles, including PR and night-fighters as well as bombers. Adolf Galland also wrote that the Mosquito left only a faint radar signal. However it should be borne in mind that Göring was by then irrational and enraged, refusing to believe bad news from senior staff, including Galland. No report of a weak radar reflection can be found in primary British sources on Mosquito trials. Also, any modest effect would have been fortuitous – see de Havilland's explanations for the use of timber, where it is not mentioned. Several authors suggest that the Mosquito was a precursor to stealth bombers, but for technical reasons, it could at best have been only a "low profile" aircraft, albeit fast and agile.)

The first Mosquito Squadron to be equipped with the Oboe bomb aiming system was No. 109, based at RAF Wyton, after working as an experimental unit at RAF Boscombe Down. They used Oboe operationally for the first time on 31 December 1942 and 1 January 1943, target marking for a force of heavy bombers attacking Düsseldorf. (Note: For some time, RAF 109 Squadron had been working as an R&D unit for trials on radar and radio counter-measures, using Anson and Wellington aircraft. In April 1942 it was ordered to develop Oboe for use in Mosquito bombers. Completing trials in August 1942, the squadron moved to RAF Wyton as part of No. 8 (Pathfinder Force) Group, to introduce it into operational service. A calibration sortie over enemy territory took place on 20/21 December, using six Mosquitoes against a power station at Lutterade in Holland. Then on 31 December/1 January 1943, No. 109 Squadron pioneered Oboe target marking for a force of heavy bombers attacking Düsseldorf.) On 1 June, the two pioneering Squadrons joined No. 109 Squadron in the re-formed No. 8 Group RAF (Bomber Command). Initially they were engaged in moderately high altitude (about 10,000 ft (3,000 m)) night bombing, with 67 trips during that summer, mainly to Berlin. Soon after, Nos. 105 and 139 Squadron bombers were widely used by the RAF Pathfinder Force, marking targets for the main night-time strategic bombing force.

Particularly after the introduction of H2S (radar) in some Mosquitoes, raids carrying large bombs succeeded to the extent that they provided a significant additional form of attack to the large formations of "heavies". Latterly in the war, there were a significant number of all-Mosquito raids on big German cities involving up to 100 or more aircraft. On the night of 20/21 February 1945, for example, Mosquitoes of No. 8 Group mounted the first of 36 consecutive night raids on Berlin.

From 1943, Mosquitoes with RAF Coastal Command attacked Kriegsmarine U-boats and intercepted transport ship concentrations. After Operation Overlord, the U-boat threat in the Western Approaches decreased fairly quickly, but correspondingly the Norwegian and Danish waters posed greater dangers. Hence the RAF Coastal Command Mosquitoes were moved to Scotland to counter this threat. The Strike Wing at Banff stood up in September 1944 and comprised Mosquito aircraft of No's 143, 144, 235 and 248 Squadrons Royal Air Force and No.333 Squadron Royal Norwegian Air Force. Despite an initially high loss rate, the Mosquito bomber variants ended the war with the lowest losses of any aircraft in RAF Bomber Command service.

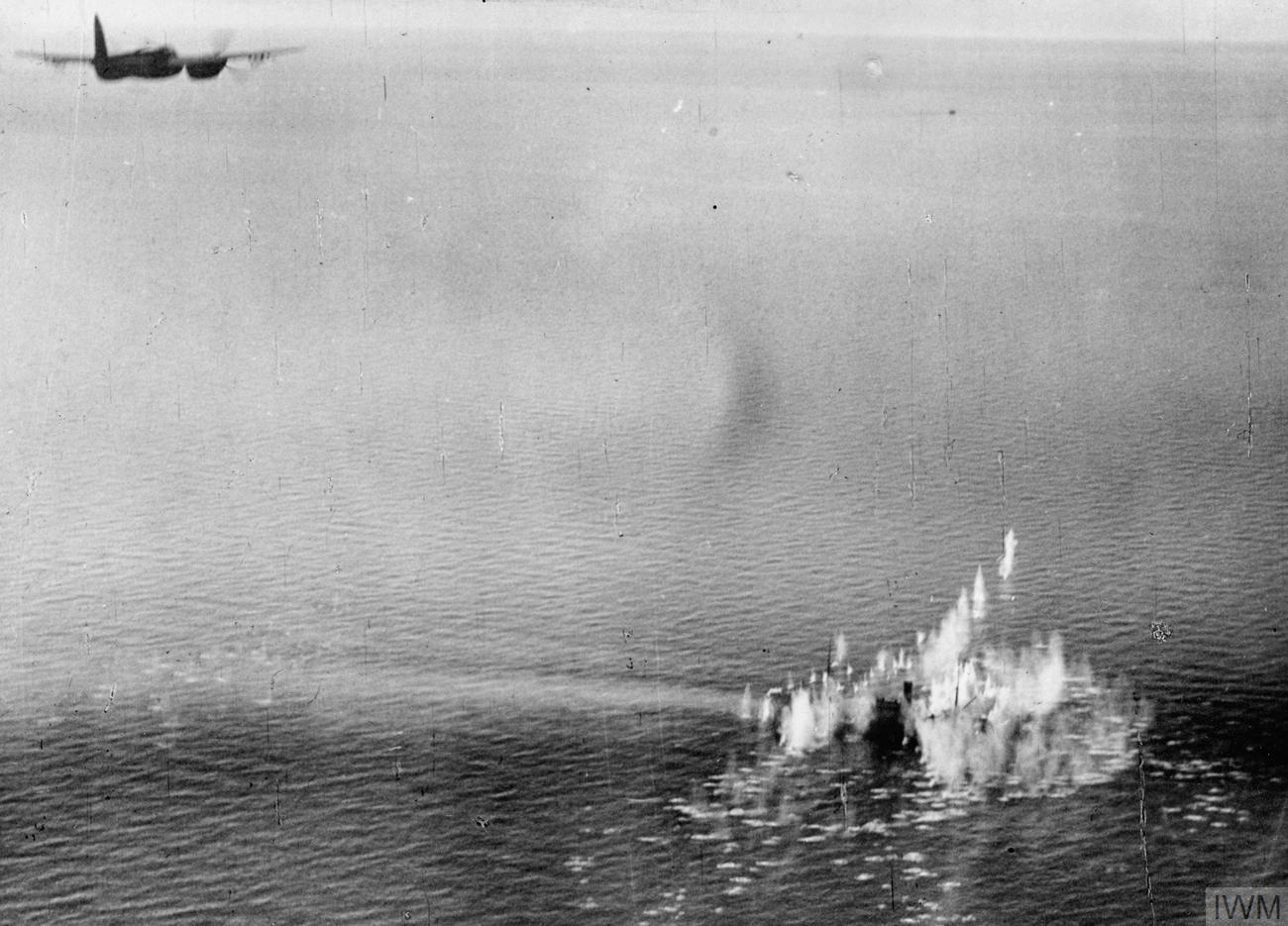
A de Havilland Mosquito of the RAF Banff Strike Wing attacking a convoy evacuating German troops in the Kattegat on 5 April 1945. A flak ship and a trawler were sunk.

The Mosquito also proved a very capable night fighter. Some of the most successful RAF pilots flew these variants. For example, Wing Commander Branse Burbridge claimed 21 kills.

Mosquitoes of No. 100 Group RAF acted as night intruders operating at high level in support of the Bomber Command "heavies", to counter the enemy tactic of merging into the bomber stream, which, towards the end of 1943, was causing serious Allied losses. These RCM (radio countermeasures) aircraft were fitted with a device called "Serrate" to allow them to track down German night fighters from their Lichtenstein B/C (low-UHF-band) and Lichtenstein SN-2 (lower end of the VHF FM broadcast band) radar emissions, as well as a device named "Perfectos" that tracked German IFF signals. These methods were responsible for the destruction of 257 German aircraft from December 1943 to April 1945. Mosquito fighters from all units accounted for 487 German aircraft during the war, the vast majority of which were night fighters.

Night fighter Mosquitos were often tasked with attacking German planes landing at airfields. In 1943, the Germans became acquainted with Moskitoschreck, "Mosquito terror", the constant fear of an unexpected Mosquito attack during a nighttime landing.

One Mosquito is listed as belonging to German secret operations unit Kampfgeschwader 200, which tested, evaluated and sometimes clandestinely operated captured enemy aircraft during the war. The aircraft was listed on the order of battle of Versuchsverband OKL's, 2 Staffel, Stab Gruppe on 10 November and 31 December 1944. However, on both lists, the Mosquito is listed as unserviceable.

The Mosquito flew its last official European war mission on 21 May 1945, when Mosquitoes of 143 Squadron and 248 Squadron RAF were ordered to continue to hunt German submarines that might be tempted to continue the fight; instead of submarines all the Mosquitoes encountered were passive E-boats.

The last operational RAF Mosquitoes were the Mosquito TT.35s, which were finally retired from No. 3 Civilian Anti-Aircraft Co-Operation Unit (CAACU) in May 1963.

In 1947–49, up to 180 Canadian surplus Mosquitoes flew many operations for the Nationalist Chinese under Chiang Kai-shek in the civil war against Communist forces. Pilots from three squadrons of Mosquitoes claimed to have sunk or damaged 500 ships during one invasion attempt. As the Communists assumed control, the remaining aircraft were evacuated to Formosa, where they flew missions against shipping.

== Variants ==
Until the end of 1942 the RAF always used Roman numerals (I, II...) for mark numbers; 1943–48 was a transition period during which new aircraft entering service were given Arabic numerals (1, 2...) for mark numbers, but older aircraft retained their Roman numerals. From 1948 onwards, Arabic numerals were used exclusively.

=== Prototypes ===
Three prototypes were built, each with a different configuration. The first to fly was W4050 on 25 November 1940, followed by the fighter W4052 on 15 May 1941 and the photo-reconnaissance prototype W4051 on 10 June 1941. W4051 later flew operationally with 1 Photographic Reconnaissance Unit (1 PRU).

=== Photo-reconnaissance ===
Media related to De Havilland Mosquito PR at Wikimedia Commons

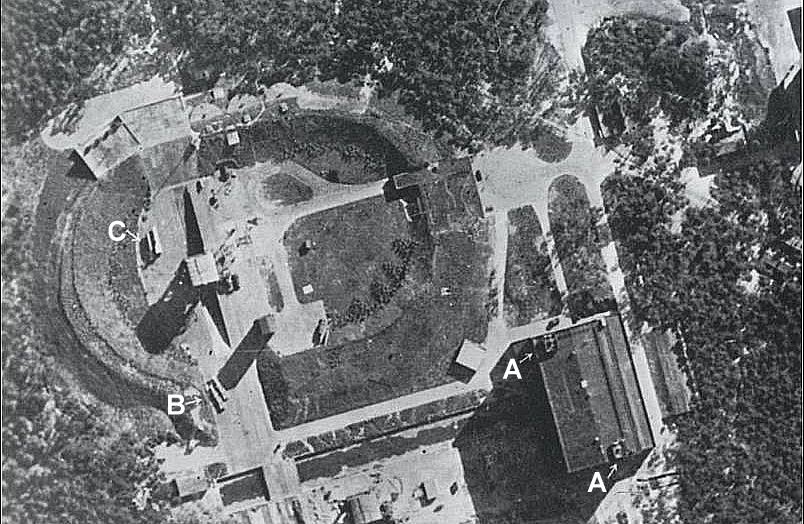
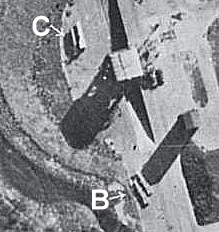
A 1943 RAF photo-reconnaissance picture of Test Stand VII at the Peenemünde Army Research Centre, taken by a Mosquito. V2 rockets, lying horizontally on transport trolleys, are labelled "B" and "C".

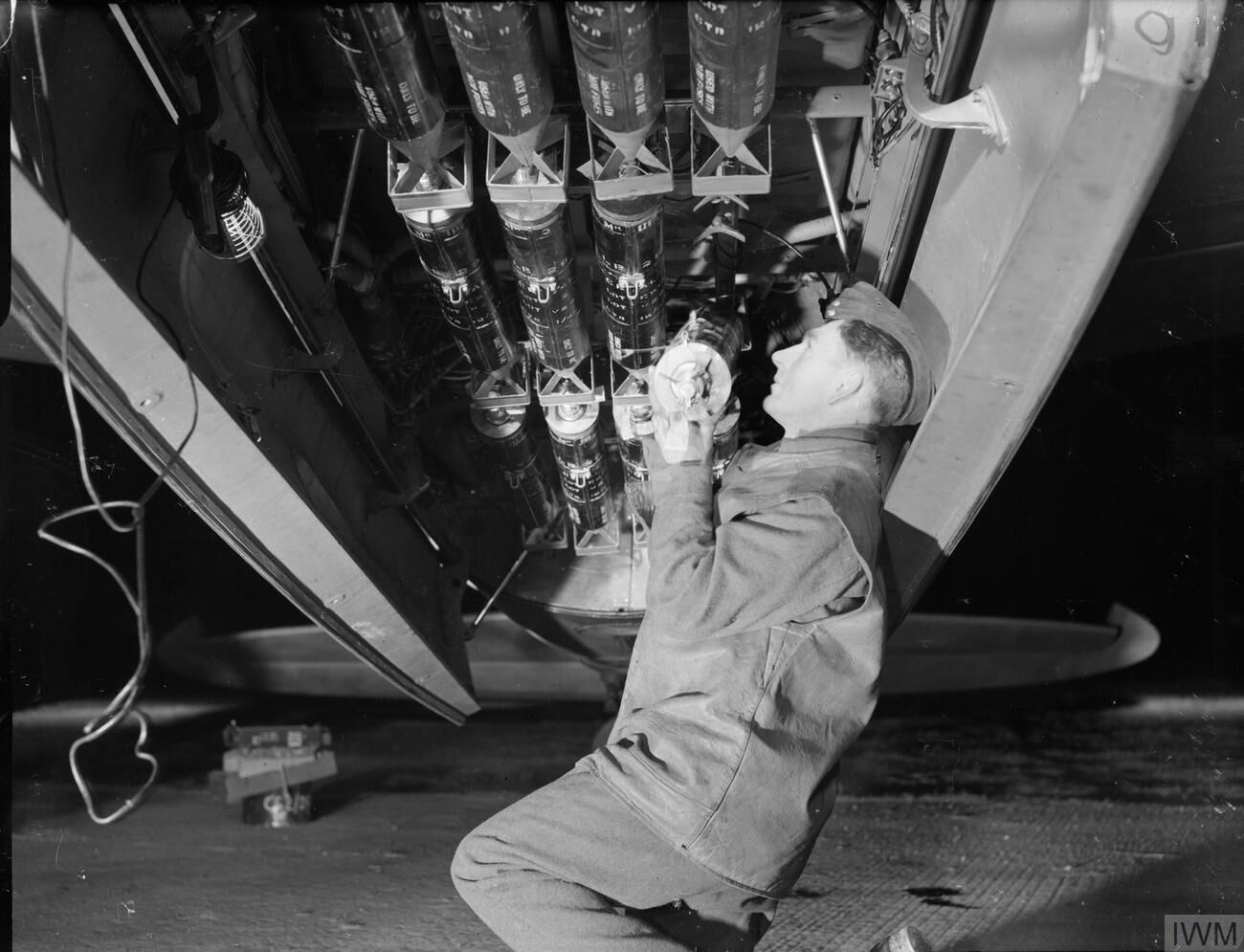
Loading photoflash bombs onto a PR Mk.XVI of No. 140 Squadron RAF at B58/Melsbroek, Belgium, circa 1944–1945

A 3-view line drawing of a Mosquito PR XVI

A total of ten Mosquito PR Mk.Is were built, four of them "long range" versions equipped with a 151 imp gal (690 L) overload fuel tank in the fuselage. The contract called for ten of the PR Mk.I airframes to be converted to B Mk.IV Series 1s. All of the PR Mk.Is, and the B Mk.IV Series 1s, had the original short engine nacelles and short span (19 ft 5.5 in) tailplanes. Their engine cowlings incorporated the original pattern of integrated exhaust manifolds, which, after relatively brief flight time, had a troublesome habit of burning and blistering the cowling panels. The first operational sortie by a Mosquito was made by a PR Mk.I, W4055, on 17 September 1941; during this sortie the unarmed Mosquito PR.I evaded three Messerschmitt Bf 109s at 23,000 ft (7,000 m). Powered by two Merlin 21s, the PR Mk.I had a maximum speed of 382 mph (615 km/h), a cruise speed of 255 mph (410 km/h), a ceiling of 35,000 ft (11,000 m), a range of 2,180 nmi (4,040 km), and a climb rate of 2,850 ft (870 m) per minute.

Over 30 Mosquito B Mk.IV bombers were converted into the PR Mk.IV photo-reconnaissance aircraft. The first operational flight by a PR Mk.IV was made by DK284 in April 1942.

The Mosquito PR Mk.VIII, built as a stopgap pending the introduction of the refined PR Mk.IX, was the next photo-reconnaissance version. The five VIIIs were converted from B Mk.IVs and became the first operational Mosquito version to be powered by two-stage, two-speed supercharged engines, using 1,565 hp (1,167 kW) Rolls-Royce Merlin 61 engines in place of Merlin 21/22s. The first PR Mk.VIII, DK324 first flew on 20 October 1942. The PR Mk.VIII had a maximum speed of 436 mph (702 km/h), an economical cruise speed of 295 mph (475 km/h) at 20,000 ft, and 350 mph (560 km/h) at 30,000 ft, a ceiling of 38,000 ft (12,000 m), a range of 2,550 nmi (4,720 km), and a climb rate of 2,500 ft per minute (760 m).

The Mosquito PR Mk.IX, 90 of which were built, was the first Mosquito variant with two-stage, two-speed engines to be produced in quantity; the first of these, LR405, first flew in April 1943. The PR Mk.IX was based on the Mosquito B Mk.IX bomber and was powered by two 1,680 hp (1,250 kW) Merlin 72/73 or 76/77 engines. It could carry either two 50 imp gal (230 L), two 100 imp gal (450 L) or two 200 imp gal (910 L) droppable fuel tanks.

The Mosquito PR Mk.XVI had a pressurised cockpit and, like the Mk.IX, was powered by two Rolls-Royce Merlin 72/73 or 76/77 piston engines. This version was equipped with three overload fuel tanks, totalling 760 imp gal (3,500 L) in the bomb bay, and could also carry two 50 imp gal (230 L) or 100 imp gal (450 L) drop tanks. A total of 435 of the PR Mk.XVI were built. The PR Mk.XVI had a maximum speed of 415 mph (668 km/h), a cruise speed of 250 mph (400 km/h), ceiling of 38,500 ft (11,700 m), a range of 2,450 nmi (4,540 km), and a climb rate of 2,900 feet per minute (884 m).

The Mosquito PR Mk.32 was a long-range, high-altitude, pressurised photo-reconnaissance version. It was powered by a pair of two-stage supercharged 1,690 hp (1,260 kW) Rolls-Royce Merlin 113 and Merlin 114 piston engines, the Merlin 113 on the starboard side and the Merlin 114 on the port. First flown in August 1944, only five were built and all were conversions from PR.XVIs.

The Mosquito PR Mk.34 and PR Mk.34A was a very long-range unarmed high altitude photo-reconnaissance version. The fuel tank and cockpit protection armour were removed. Additional fuel was carried in a bulged bomb bay: 1,192 gallons—the equivalent of 5,419 mi (8,721 km). A further two 200-gallon (910-litre) drop tanks under the outer wings gave a range of 3,600 mi (5,800 km) cruising at 300 mph (480 km/h). Powered by two 1,690 hp (1,260 kW) Merlin 114s first used in the PR.32. The port Merlin 114 drove a Marshal cabin supercharger. A total of 181 were built, including 50 built by Percival Aircraft Company at Luton. The PR.34's maximum speed (TAS) was 335 mph (539 km/h) at sea level, 405 mph (652 km/h) at 17,000 ft (5,200 m) and 425 mph (684 km/h) at 30,000 ft (9,100 m). All PR.34s were installed with four split F52 vertical cameras, two forward, two aft of the fuselage tank and one F24 oblique camera. Sometimes a K-17 camera was used for air surveys. In August 1945, the PR.34A was the final photo-reconnaissance variant with one Merlin 113A and 114A each delivering 1,710 hp (1,280 kW).

Colonel Roy M. Stanley II, USAF (RET) wrote: "I consider the Mosquito the best photo-reconnaissance aircraft of the war".

After the end of World War II Spartan Air Services used ten ex-RAF Mosquitoes, mostly B.35s plus one of only six PR.35s built, for high-altitude photographic survey work in Canada.

=== Bombers ===
Media related to De Havilland Mosquito B at Wikimedia Commons

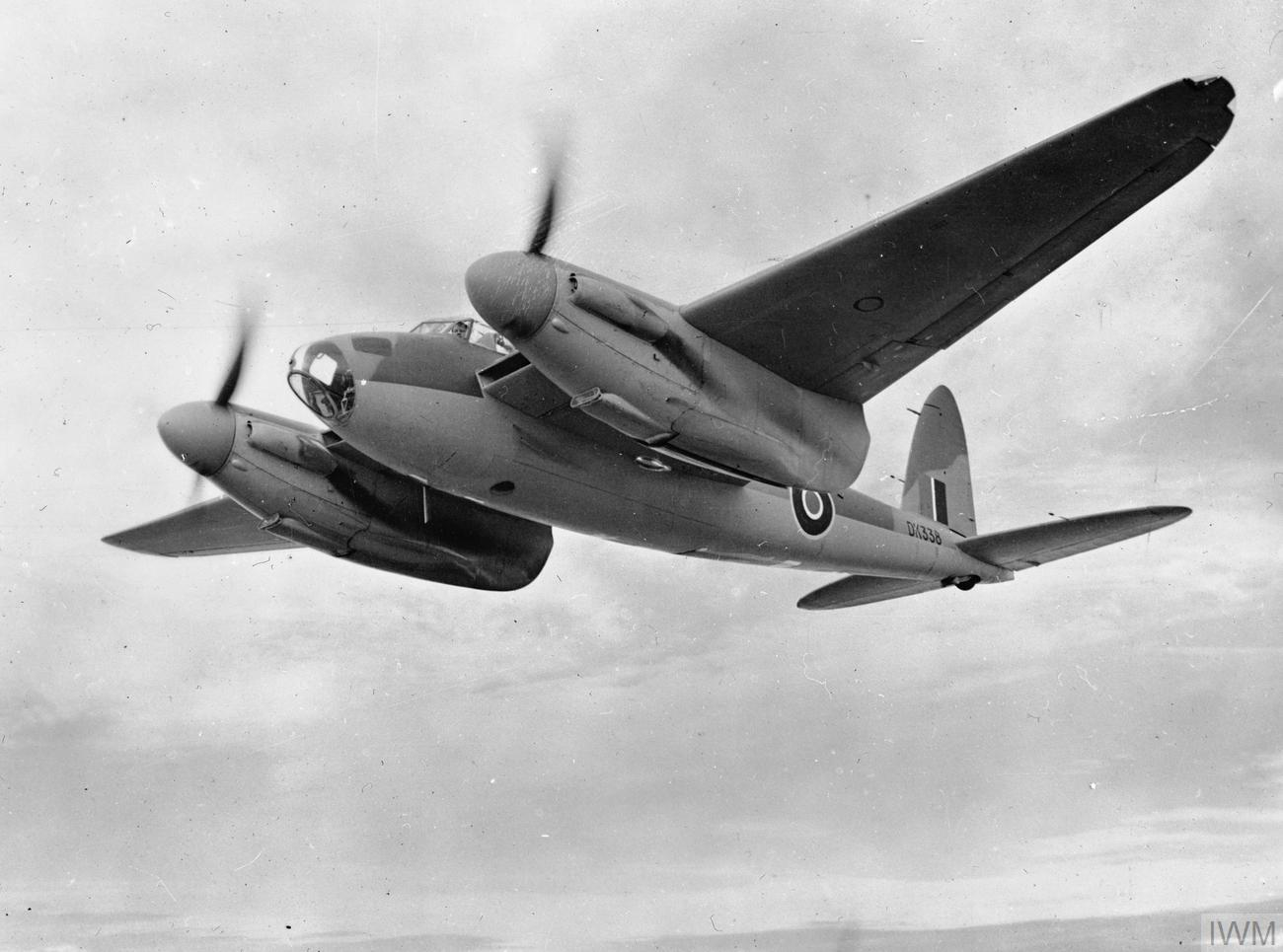
Mosquito B Mk.IV Series 2, DK338, built in September 1942 and delivered to 105 Squadron, becoming GB-O.

On 21 June 1941 the Air Ministry ordered that the last ten Mosquitoes, ordered as photo-reconnaissance aircraft, should be converted to bombers. These ten aircraft were part of the original 1 March 1940 production order and became the B Mk.IV Series 1. W4052 was to be the prototype and flew for the first time on 8 September 1941.

The bomber prototype led to the B Mk.IV, of which 273 were built: apart from the 10 Series 1s, all of the rest were built as Series 2s with extended nacelles, revised exhaust manifolds, with integrated flame dampers, and larger tailplanes. Series 2 bombers also differed from the Series 1 in having an increased payload of four 500 lb (230 kg) bombs, instead of the four 250 lb (110 kg) bombs of Series 1. This was made possible by cropping, or shortening the tail of the 500 lb (230 kg) bomb so that these four heavier weapons could be carried (or a 2,000 lb (920 kg) total load). The B Mk.IV entered service in May 1942 with 105 Squadron.

In April 1943 it was decided to convert a B Mk.IV to carry a 4,000 lb (1,800 kg) Blockbuster bomb (nicknamed "cookie"). The conversion, including modified bomb bay suspension arrangements, bulged bomb bay doors and fairings, was relatively straightforward and 54 B.IVs were modified and distributed to squadrons of the Light Night Striking Force. 27 B Mk.IVs were later converted for special operations with the Highball anti-shipping weapon, and were used by 618 Squadron, formed in April 1943 specifically to use this weapon. A B Mk.IV, DK290 was initially used as a trials aircraft for the bomb, followed by DZ471,530 and 533. The B Mk.IV had a maximum speed of 380 mph (610 km/h), a cruising speed of 265 mph (426 km/h), ceiling of 34,000 ft (10,000 m), a range of 2,040 nmi (3,780 km), and a climb rate of 2,500 ft per minute (12.7 m/s).

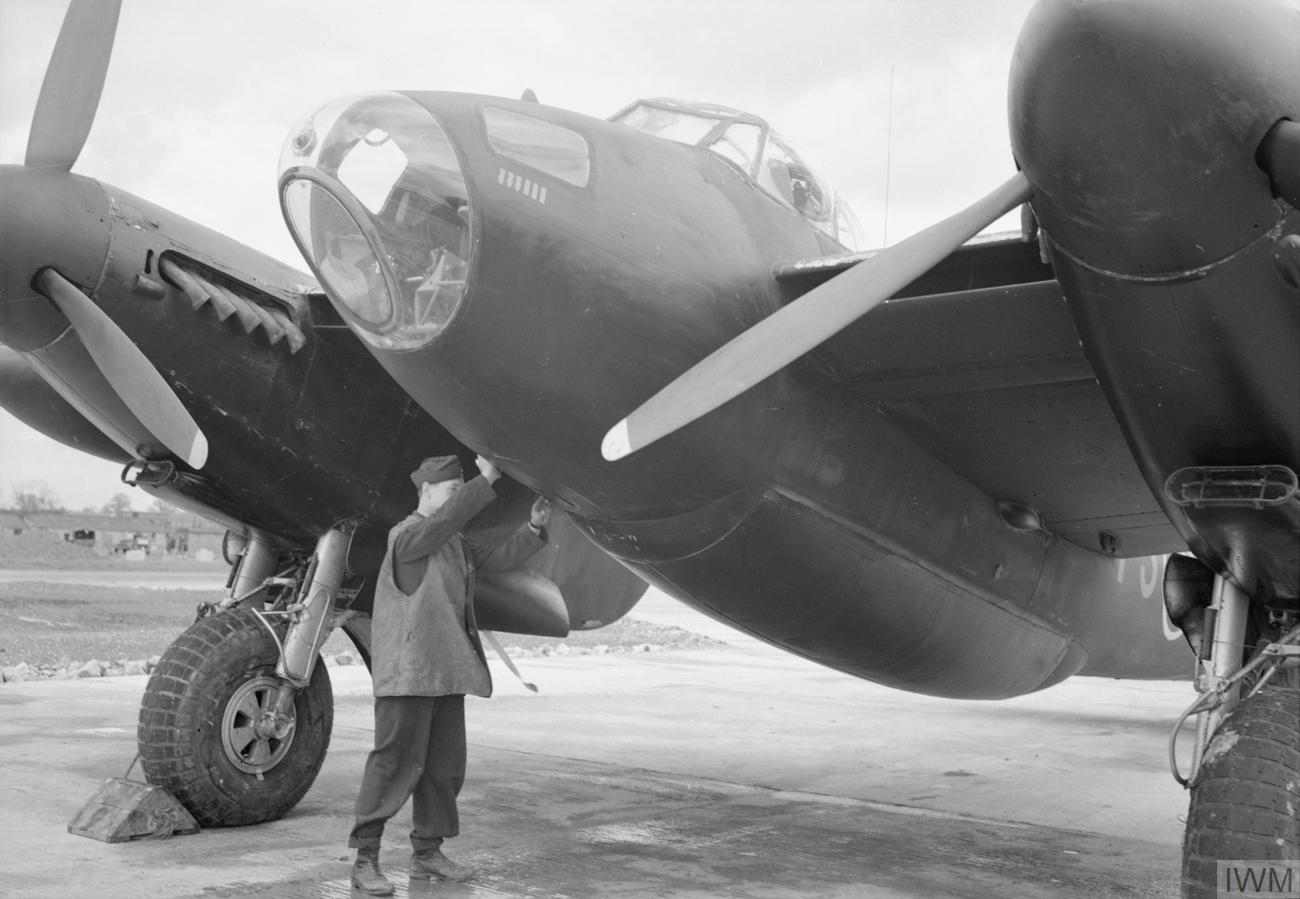
B Mk.IV (modified) of No. 692 Squadron, showing bulged bomb bay doors to accommodate the 4,000lb Cookie.

Other bomber variants of the Mosquito included the Merlin 21 powered B Mk.V high-altitude version. Trials with this configuration were made with W4057, which had strengthened wings and two additional fuel tanks, or alternatively, two 500 lb (230 kg) bombs. This design was not produced in Britain, but formed the basic design of the Canadian-built B.VII. Only W4057 was built in prototype form. The Merlin 31 powered B Mk.VII was built by de Havilland Canada and first flown on 24 September 1942. It only saw service in Canada, 25 were built. Six were handed over to the United States Army Air Forces.

B Mk.IX (54 built) was powered by the Merlin 72,73, 76 or 77. The two-stage Merlin variant was based on the PR.IX. The prototype DK 324 was converted from a PR.VIII and first flew on 24 March 1943. In October 1943 it was decided that all B Mk.IVs and all B Mk.IXs then in service would be converted to carry the 4,000 lb (1,800 kg) "Cookie", and all B Mk.IXs built after that date were designed to allow them to be converted to carry the weapon. The B Mk.IX had a maximum speed of 408 mph (657 km/h), an economical cruise speed of 295 mph (475 km/h) at 20,000 ft, and 350 mph (560 km/h) at 30,000 ft, ceiling of 36,000 ft (11,000 m), a range of 2,450 nmi (4,540 km), and a climb rate of 2,850 feet per minute (14.5 m/s). The IX could carry a maximum load of 2,000–4,000 lb (910–1,810 kg) of bombs. A Mosquito B Mk.IX holds the record for the most combat operations flown by an Allied bomber in the Second World War. LR503, known as "F for Freddie" (from its squadron code letters, GB*F), first served with No. 109 and subsequently, No. 105 RAF squadrons. It flew 213 sorties during the war, only to crash at Calgary airport during the Eighth Victory Loan Bond Drive on 10 May 1945, two days after Victory in Europe Day, killing both the pilot, Flt. Lt. Maurice Briggs, DSO, DFC, DFM and navigator Fl. Off. John Baker, DFC and Bar.

The B Mk.XVI was powered by the same variations as the B.IX. All B Mk.XVIs were capable of being converted to carry the 4,000 lb (1,800 kg) "Cookie". The two-stage powerplants were added along with a pressurised cabin. DZ540 first flew on 1 January 1944. The prototype was converted from a IV (402 built). The next variant, the B Mk.XX, was powered by Packard Merlins 31 and 33s. It was the Canadian version of the IV. Altogether, 245 were built. The B Mk.XVI had a maximum speed of 408 mph (657 km/h), an economical cruise speed of 295 mph (475 km/h) at 20,000 ft, and 350 mph (560 km/h) at 30,000 ft, ceiling of 37,000 ft (11,000 m), a range of 1,485 nmi (2,750 km), and a climb rate of 2,800 ft per minute (14 m/s). The type could carry 4,000 lb (1,800 kg) of bombs.

The B.35 was powered by Merlin 113 and 114As. Some were converted to TT.35s (Target Tugs) and others were used as PR.35s (photo-reconnaissance). The B.35 had a maximum speed of 422 mph (679 km/h), a cruising speed of 276 mph (444 km/h), ceiling of 42,000 ft (13,000 m), a range of 1,750 nmi (3,240 km), and a climb rate of 2,700 ft per minute (13.7 m/s). A total of 174 B.35s were delivered up to the end of 1945. (Note: RV series 4; TA series 82; TH/TJ series 60; and TK series 19.) A further 100 were delivered from 1946 for a grand total of 274, 65 of which were built by Airspeed Ltd. (Note: The final 100 were: RS series 25; TK series 35; VP series 25; and VR series 15.)

=== Fighters ===
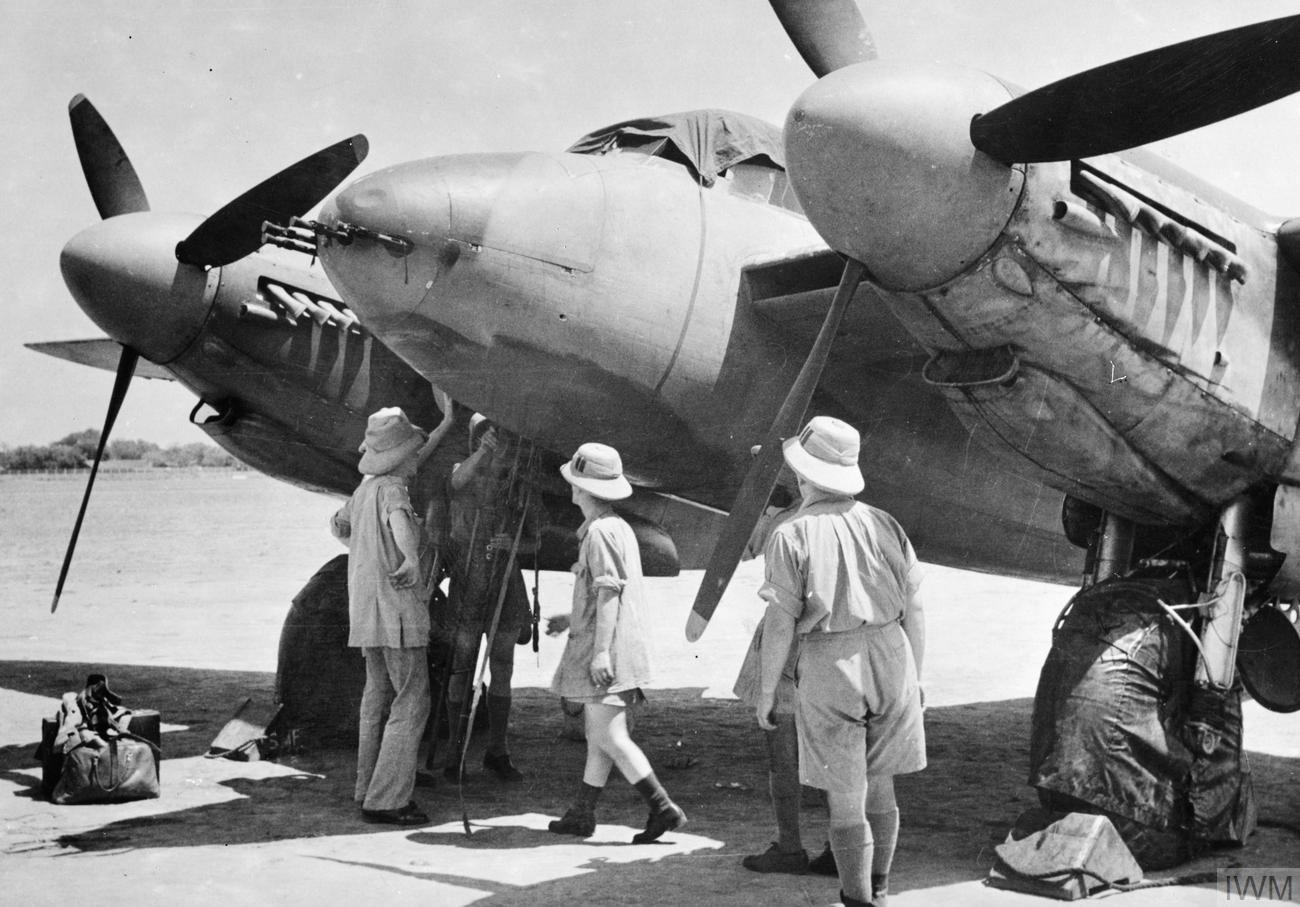
Mosquito F Mk.II in India c. 1943

Developed during 1940, the first prototype of the Mosquito F Mk.II was completed on 15 May 1941. These Mosquitoes were fitted with four 20 mm (0.79 in) Hispano cannon in the fuselage belly and four .303 (7.7 mm) Browning machine guns mounted in the nose. On production Mk.IIs the machine guns and ammunition tanks were accessed via two centrally hinged, sideways opening doors in the upper nose section. To arm and service the cannon the bomb bay doors were replaced by manually operated bay doors: the F and NF Mk.IIs could not carry bombs. The type was also fitted with a gun camera in a compartment above the machine guns in the nose and was fitted with exhaust flame dampers to reduce the glare from the Merlin XXs.

In the summer of 1942, Britain experienced day-time incursions of the high-altitude reconnaissance bomber, the Junkers Ju 86P. Although the Ju 86P only carried a light bomb load, it overflew sensitive areas, including Bristol, Bedfordshire and Hertfordshire. Bombs were dropped on Luton and elsewhere, and the aircraft responsible was seen from the main de Havilland offices and factory at Hatfield. An attempt to intercept it with a Spitfire from RAF Manston was unsuccessful. As a result of the potential threat, a decision was quickly taken to develop a high-altitude Mosquito interceptor, using the MP469 prototype.

MP469 entered the experimental shop on 7 September and made its initial flight on 14 September, piloted by John de Havilland. The bomber nose was altered using a normal fighter nose, armed with four standard .303 (7.7 mm) Browning machine guns. The low pressure cabin retained a bomber canopy structure and a two-piece windscreen. The control wheel was replaced with a fighter control stick. The wingspan was increased to 59 ft (18 m). The airframe was lightened by removing armour plating, some fuel tanks and other fitments. Smaller-diameter main wheels were fitted after the first few flights. At a loaded weight of 16,200 lb (7,300 kg) this HA Mk.XV was 2,300 lb (1,000 kg) lighter than a standard Mk.II. For this first conversion, the engines were a pair of Merlin 61s. On 15 September, John de Havilland reached an altitude of 43,000 ft (13,000 m) in this version. The aircraft was delivered to a High Altitude Flight which had been formed at RAF Northolt. However, the high-level German daylight intruders were no longer to be seen. It was subsequently revealed that only five Ju 86P aircraft had been built and they had only flown 12 sorties. Nevertheless, the general need for high altitude interceptors was recognised – but now the emphasis was to be upon night fighters.

The A&AEE tested the climb and speed of night fighter conversion of MP469 in January 1943 for the Ministry of Aircraft Production. Wingspan had been increased to 62 ft (19 m), the Brownings had been moved to a fairing below the fuselage. According to Birtles, an AI radar was mounted in the nose and the Merlins were upgraded to Mk76 type, although Boscombe Down reported Merlin 61s. In addition to MP469, four more B Mk.IVs were converted into NF MK XVs. The Fighter Interception Unit at RAF Ford carried out service trials, March 1943, and then these five aircraft went to 85 Squadron, Hunsdon, where they were flown from April until August of that year. The greatest height reached in service was 44,600 ft (13,600 m).

Apart from the F Mk.XV, all Mosquito fighters and fighter bombers featured a modified canopy structure incorporating a flat, single-piece armoured windscreen, and the crew entry/exit door was moved from the bottom of the forward fuselage to the right side of the nose, just forward of the wing leading edge.

=== Night fighters ===
Media related to De Havilland Mosquito NF at Wikimedia Commons

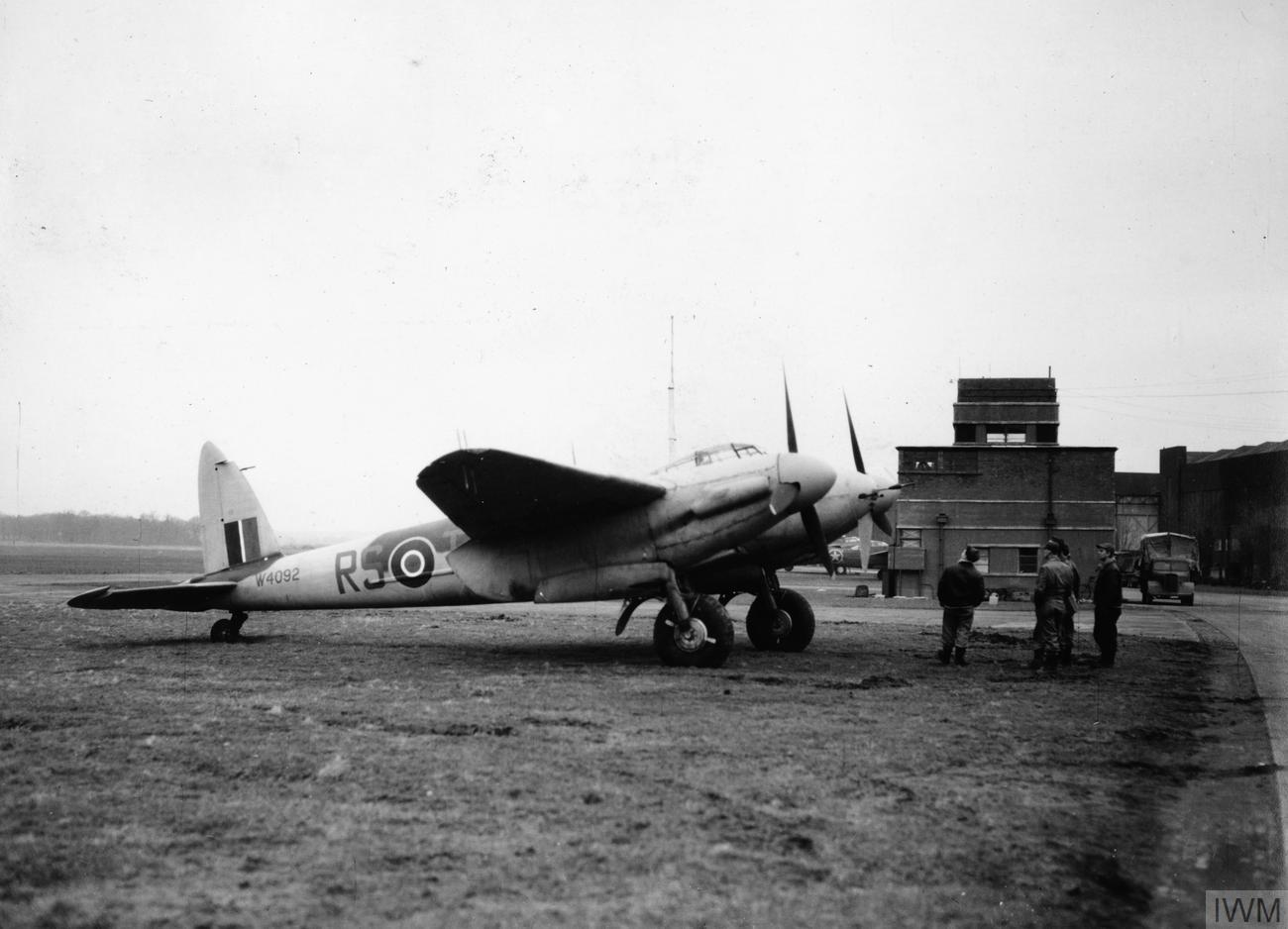
Mosquito NF Mk.II W4092 of 157 Squadron, January 1944. Just visible is part of the aerial array for the A.I. Mk.IV near the wingtip.

At the end of 1940, the Air Staff's preferred turret-equipped night fighter design to Operational Requirement O.R. 95 was the Gloster F.18/40 (derived from their F.9/37). However, although in agreement as to the quality of the Gloster company's design, the Ministry of Aircraft Production was concerned that Gloster would not be able to work on the F.18/40 and also the jet fighter design, considered the greater priority. Consequently, in mid-1941 the Air Staff and MAP agreed that the Gloster aircraft would be dropped and the Mosquito, when fitted with a turret would be considered for the night fighter requirement.

The first production night fighter Mosquitoes – minus turrets – were designated NF Mk.II. A total of 466 were built with the first entering service with No. 157 Squadron in January 1942, replacing the Douglas Havoc. These aircraft were similar to the F Mk.II, but were fitted with the AI Mk.IV metric wavelength radar. The herring-bone transmitting antenna was mounted on the nose and the dipole receiving antennae were carried under the outer wings. A number of NF IIs had their radar equipment removed and additional fuel tanks installed in the bay behind the cannon for use as night intruders. These aircraft, designated NF II (Special) were first used by 23 Squadron in operations over Europe in 1942. 23 Squadron was then deployed to Malta on 20 December 1942, and operated against targets in Italy.

Ninety-seven NF Mk.IIs were upgraded with 3.3 GHz frequency, low-SHF-band AI Mk.VIII radar and these were designated NF Mk.XII. The NF Mk.XIII, of which 270 were built, was the production equivalent of the Mk.XII conversions. These "centimetric" radar sets were mounted in a solid "thimble" (Mk.XII / XIII) or universal "bull nose" (Mk.XVII / XIX) radome, which required the machine guns to be dispensed with.

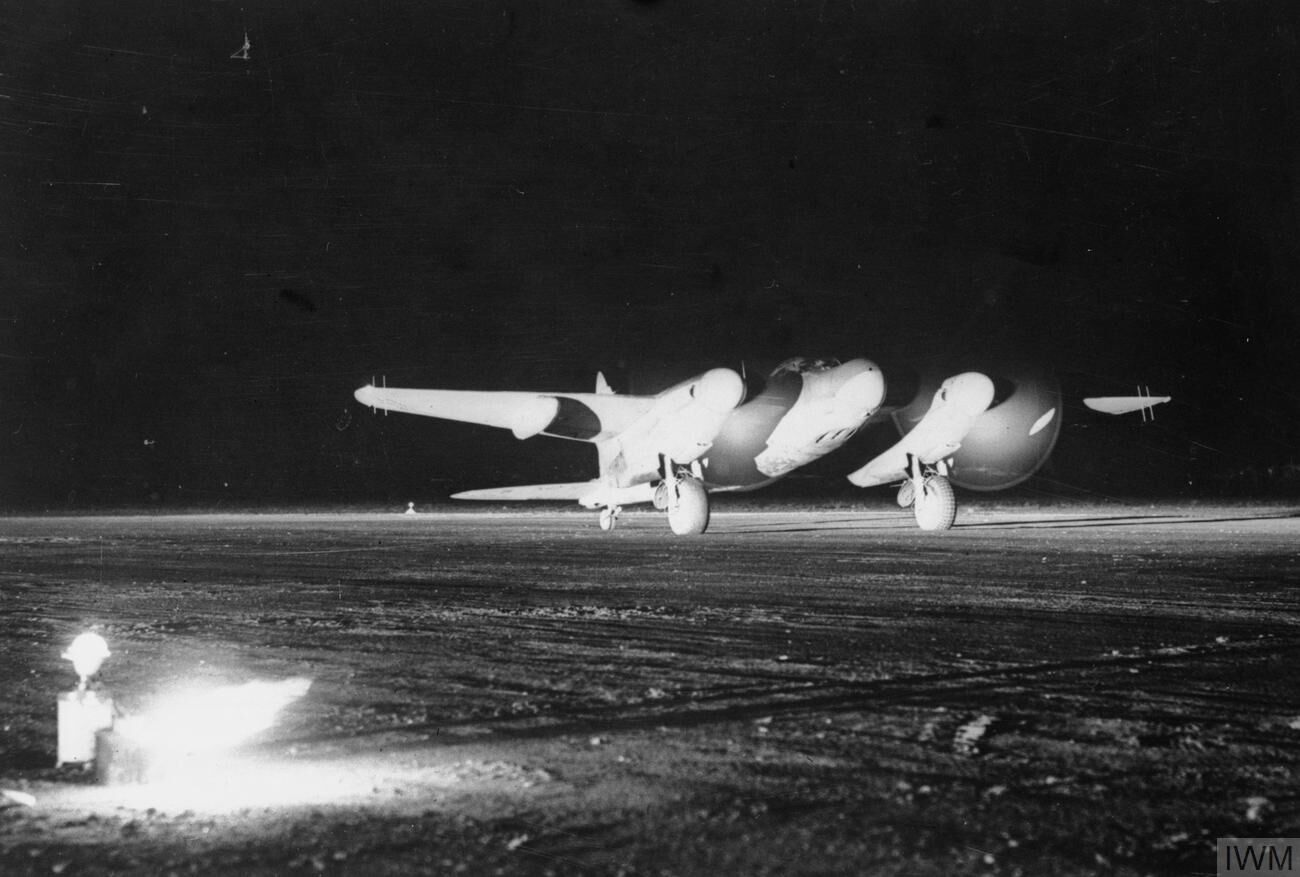
NF Mk.XIII of 256 Squadron, with the "bull nose", caught in the beam of a Chance light on the main runway at Foggia, Italy, before taking off on a night intruder sortie.

Four F Mk.XVs were converted to the NF Mk.XV. These were fitted with AI Mk.VIII in a "thimble" radome, and the .303 Brownings were moved into a gun pack fitted under the forward fuselage.

NF Mk.XVII was the designation for 99 NF Mk.II conversions, with single-stage Merlin 21, 22, or 23 engines, but British AI.X (US SCR-720) radar.

The NF Mk.XIX was an improved version of the NF XIII. It could be fitted with American or British AI radars; 220 were built.

The J 30 was the designation for the NF Mk.XIX in the Swedish Air Force. It was outfitted with new four-bladed propellers, the American SCR-720 radar, a modified canopy and new instruments, including the FR-8 radio.

The NF Mk.30 was the final wartime variant and was a high-altitude version, powered by two 1,710 hp (1,280 kW) Rolls-Royce Merlin 76s. The NF Mk.30 had a maximum speed of 424 mph (682 km/h) at 26,500 ft (8,100 m). It also carried early electronic countermeasures equipment. 526 were built.

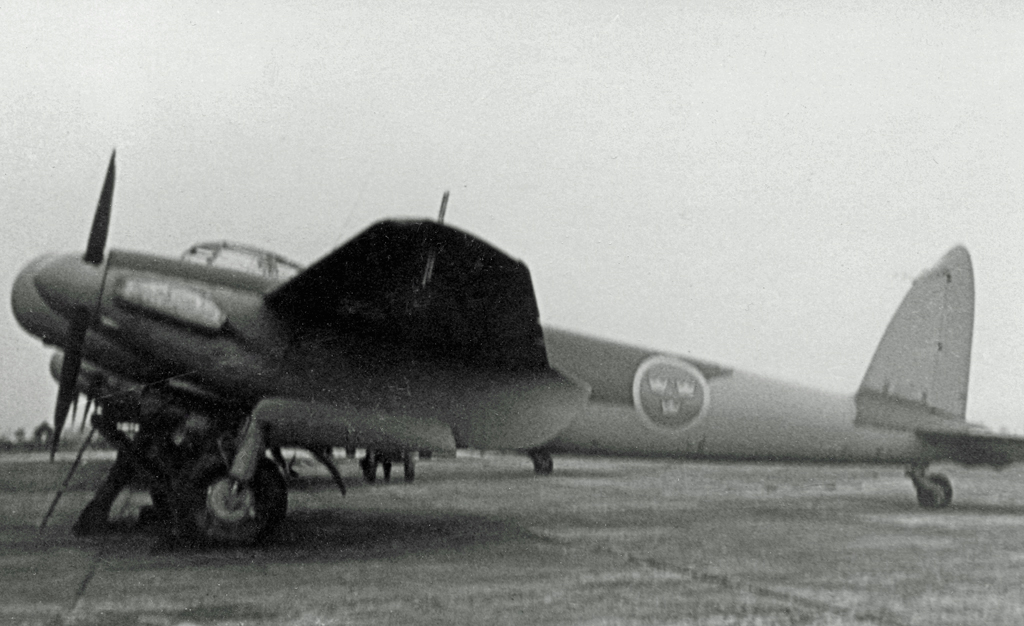
Swedish Air Force J 30 Mosquito NF.XIX, operational in 1949.

Other Mosquito night fighter variants planned but never built included the NF Mk.X and NF Mk.XIV (the latter based on the NF Mk.XIII), both of which were to have two-stage Merlins. The NF Mk.31 was a variant of the NF Mk.30, but powered by Packard Merlins.

After the war, two more night fighter versions were developed:

The NF Mk.36 was similar to the Mosquito NF Mk.30, but fitted with the American-built AI.Mk.X radar. Powered by two 1,690 hp (1,260 kW) Rolls-Royce Merlin 113/114 piston engines; 266 built. Max level speeds (TAS) with flame dampers fitted were 305 mph (491 km/h) at sea level, 380 mph (610 km/h) at 17,000 ft (5,200 m), and 405 mph (652 km/h) at 30,000 ft (9,100 m).

The NF Mk.38, 101 of which were built, was also similar to the Mosquito NF Mk.30, but fitted with the British-built AI Mk.IX radar. This variant suffered from stability problems and did not enter RAF service: 60 were eventually sold to Yugoslavia. According to the Pilot's Notes and Air Ministry 'Special Flying Instruction TF/487', which posted limits on the Mosquito's maximum speeds, the NF Mk.38 had a VNE of 370 knots (425 mph), without under-wing stores, and within the altitude range of sea level to 10,000 ft (3,000 m). However, from 10,000 to 15,000 ft (4,600 m) the maximum speed was 348 knots (400 mph). As the height increased other recorded speeds were; 15,000 to 20,000 ft (6,100 m) 320 knots (368 mph); 20,000 to 25,000 ft (7,600 m), 295 knots (339 mph); 25,000 to 30,000 ft (9,100 m), 260 knots (299 mph); 30,000 to 35,000 ft (11,000 m), 235 knots (270 mph). With two added 100-gallon fuel tanks this performance fell; between sea level and 15,000 feet 330 knots (379 mph); between 15,000 and 20,000 ft (6,100 m) 320 knots (368 mph); 20,000 to 25,000 ft (7,600 m), 295 knots (339 mph); 25,000 to 30,000 ft (9,100 m), 260 knots (299 mph); 30,000 to 35,000 ft (11,000 m), 235 knots (270 mph). Little difference was noted above 15,000 ft (4,600 m).

=== Strike ("fighter-bomber") variants ===
Media related to De Havilland Mosquito FB at Wikimedia Commons

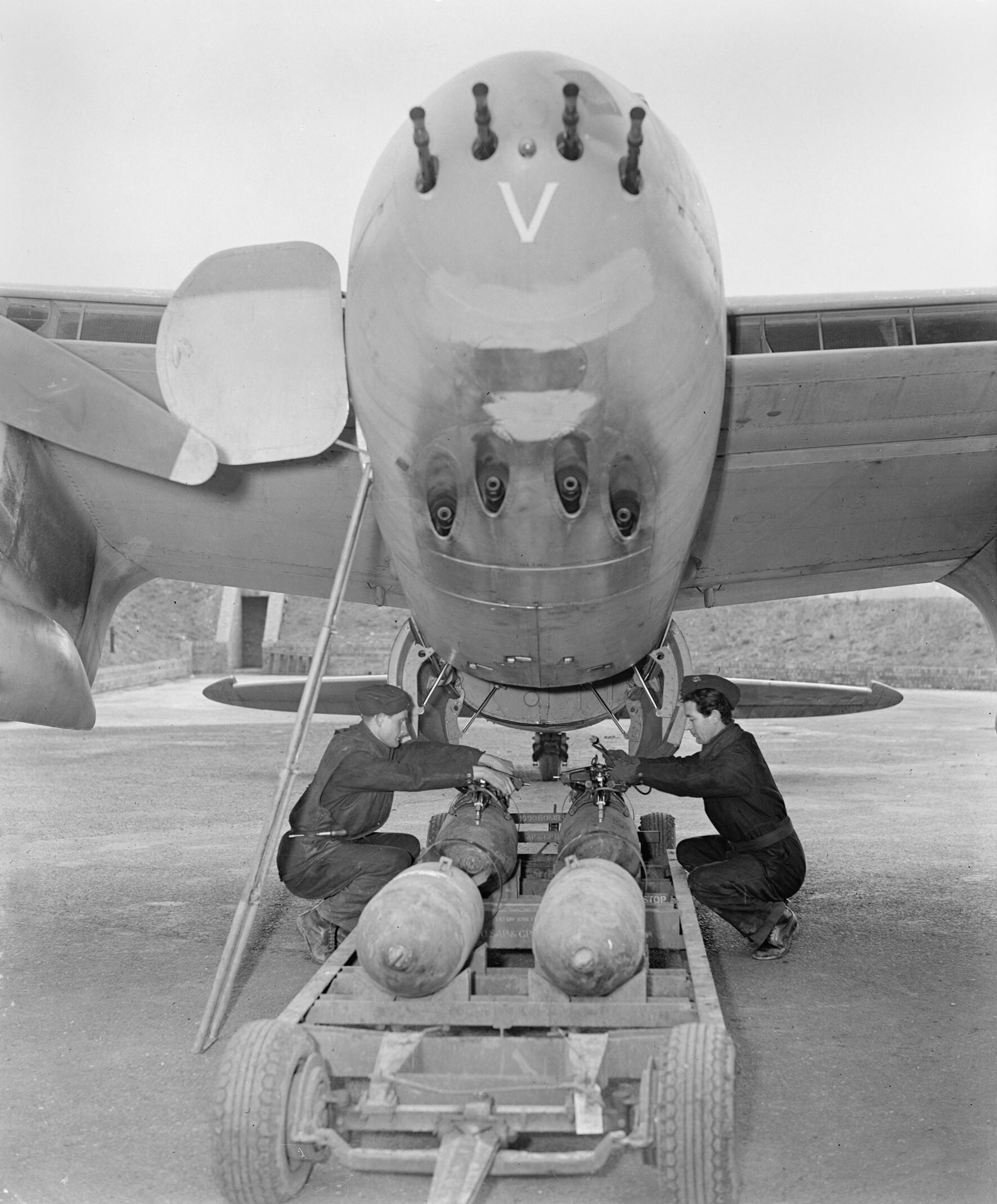
Guns and bombs of an RAAF FB Mk. VI

The FB Mk. VI, which first flew on 1 June 1942, was powered by two, single-stage two-speed, 1,460 hp (1,090 kW) Merlin 21s or 1,635 hp (1,219 kW) Merlin 25s, and introduced a re-stressed and reinforced "basic" wing structure capable of carrying single 250-or-500 lb (110-or-230 kg) bombs on racks housed in streamlined fairings under each wing, or up to eight RP-3 25lb or 60 lb rockets. In addition fuel lines were added to the wings to enable single 50 imp gal (230 L) or 100 imp gal (450 L) drop tanks to be carried under each wing. The usual fixed armament was four 20 mm Hispano Mk.II cannon and four .303 (7.7 mm) Browning machine guns, while two 250-or-500 lb (110-or-230 kg) bombs could be carried in the bomb bay. (Note: The FB Mk. VI was built in two sub-series, differentiated by the weight of offensive stores able to be carried: Series i aircraft could only carry 250 lb (110 kg) bombs, while Series ii could carry the 500 lb (230 kg) bombs.)

Unlike the F Mk.II, the ventral bay doors were split into two pairs, with the forward pair being used to access the cannon, while the rear pair acted as bomb bay doors. The maximum fuel load was 719.5 imp gal (3,271 L; 864.1 US gal) distributed between 453 imp gal (2,060 L; 544 US gal) internal fuel tanks, plus two overload tanks, each of 66.5 imp gal (302 L; 79.9 US gal) capacity, which could be fitted in the bomb bay, and two 100 imp gal (450 L; 120 US gal) drop tanks. All-out level speed is often given as 368 mph (592 km/h; 320 kn), although this speed applies to aircraft fitted with saxophone exhausts. The test aircraft (HJ679) fitted with stub exhausts performed below expectations. It was returned to de Havilland at Hatfield where it was serviced. Its top speed was then tested and found to be 384 mph (618 km/h; 334 kn), in line with expectations. 2,298 FB Mk. VIs were built, nearly one third of Mosquito production. Two were converted to TR.33 carrier-borne, maritime strike prototypes.

The FB Mk. VI proved capable of holding its own against fighter aircraft, in addition to strike/bombing roles. For example, on 15 January 1945 Mosquito FB Mk. VIs of 143 Squadron were engaged by 30 Focke-Wulf Fw 190s from Jagdgeschwader 5: the Mosquitoes sank an armed trawler and two merchant ships, but five Mosquitoes were lost (two reportedly to flak), while shooting down five Fw 190s.

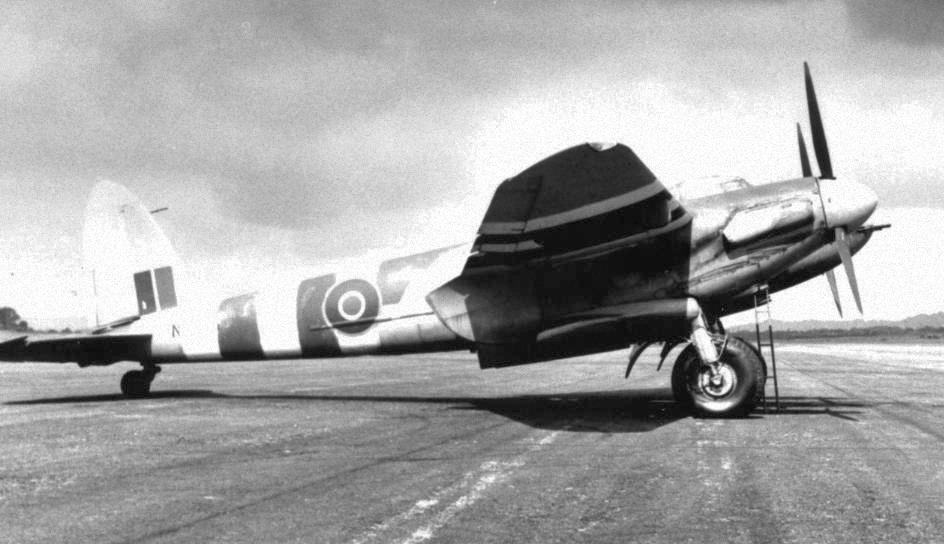
An FB Mk. VI NS898 of 613 Squadron, June 1944, shows full invasion stripes and is well weathered through operational use.

Another fighter-bomber variant was the Mosquito FB Mk. XVIII (known as the Tsetse) of which one was converted from a FB Mk. VI to serve as prototype and 17 were purpose-built. The Mk.XVIII was armed with a Molins "6-pounder Class M" cannon: this was a modified QF 6-pounder (57 mm) anti-tank gun fitted with an auto-loader to allow both semi- or fully automatic fire. (Note: "Molins" refers specifically to the auto-loading mechanism produced by the Molins company.) 25 rounds were carried, with the entire installation weighing 1,580 lb (720 kg). In addition, 900 lb (410 kg) of armour was added within the engine cowlings, around the nose and under the cockpit floor to protect the engines and crew from heavily armed U-boats, the intended primary target of the Mk.XVIII. Two or four .303 (7.7 mm) Browning machine guns were retained in the nose and were used to "sight" the main weapon onto the target.

The Air Ministry initially suspected that this variant would not work, but tests proved otherwise. Although the gun provided the Mosquito with yet more anti-shipping firepower for use against U-boats, it required a steady approach run to aim and fire the gun, making its wooden construction an even greater liability, in the face of intense anti-aircraft fire. The gun had a muzzle velocity of 2,950 ft/s (900 m/s) and an excellent range of some 1,800–1,500 yd (1,600–1,400 m). It was sensitive to sidewards movement; an attack required a dive from 5,000 ft (1,500 m) at a 30° angle with the turn and bank indicator on centre. A move during the dive could jam the gun. The prototype HJ732 was converted from a FB.VI and was first flown on 8 June 1943.

The effect of the new weapon was demonstrated on 10 March 1944 when Mk.XVIIIs from 248 Squadron (escorted by four Mk.VIs) engaged a German convoy of one U-boat and four destroyers, protected by ten Ju 88s. Three of the Ju 88s were shot down. Pilot Tony Phillips destroyed one Ju 88 with four shells, one of which tore an engine off the Ju 88. The U-boat was damaged. On 25 March, U-976 was sunk by Molins-equipped Mosquitoes. On 10 June, U-821 was abandoned in the face of intense air attack from No. 248 Squadron, and was later sunk by a Liberator of No. 206 Squadron. On 5 April 1945 Mosquitoes with Molins attacked five German surface ships in the Kattegat and again demonstrated their value by setting them all on fire and sinking them. A German Sperrbrecher ("minefield breaker") was lost with all hands, with some 200 bodies being recovered by Swedish vessels. Some 900 German soldiers died in total. On 9 April, German U-boats U-804, U-843 and U-1065 were spotted in formation heading for Norway. All were sunk with rockets. U-251 and U-2359 followed on 19 April and 2 May 1945, also sunk by rockets.

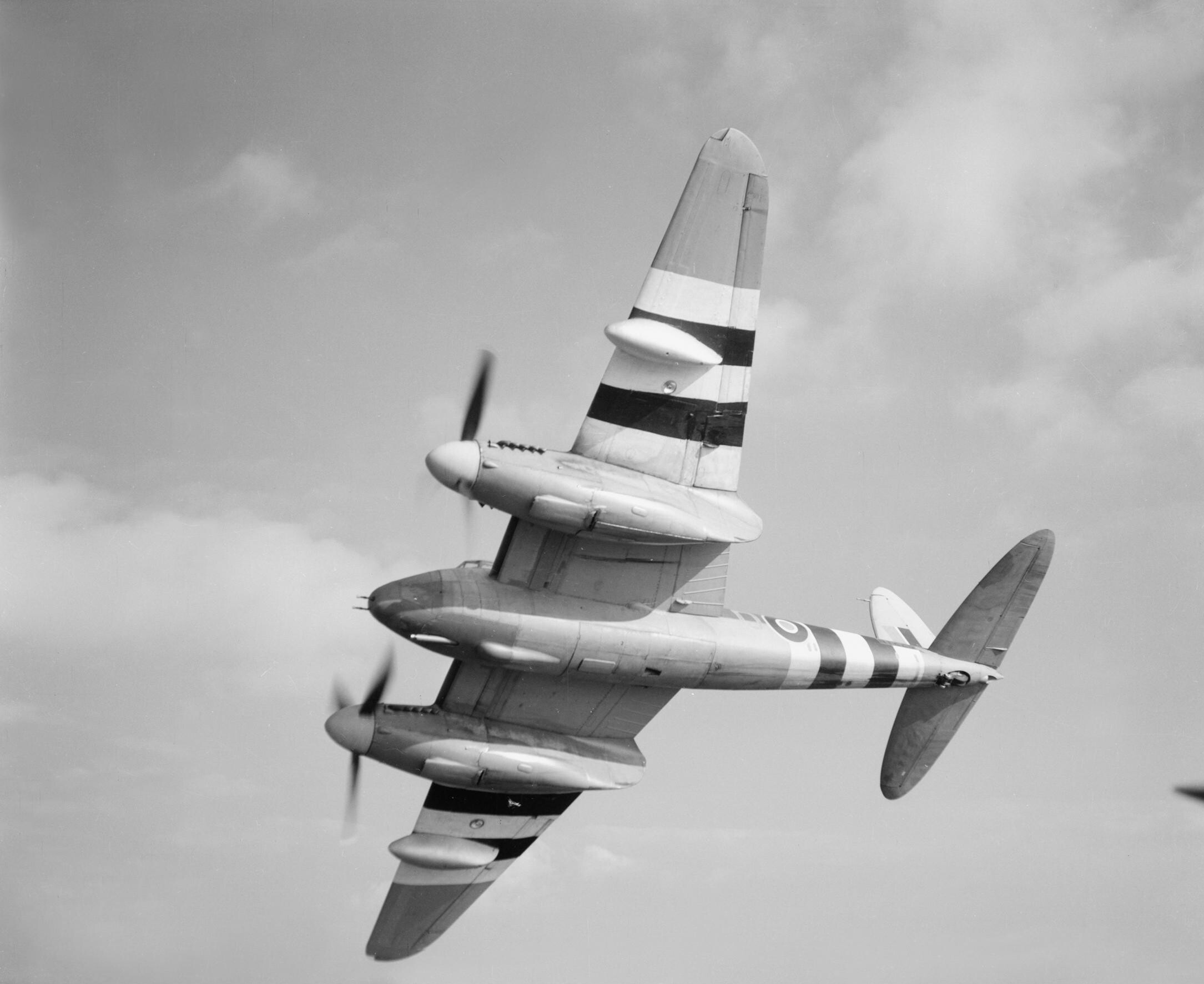
Mosquito FB Mk. XVIII NT225 of 248 Squadron Special Detachment. Note the 57 mm Molins gun and streamlined blister used to accommodate the automatic loading mechanism. (Note: On 27 March 1944, the MK XVIIIs of 248 Squadron were formed into the "Special Detachment" unit, which continued through to January 1945.)

Designs based on the Mk.VI were the FB Mk. 26, built in Canada, and the FB Mk.40, built in Australia, powered by Packard Merlins. The FB.26 improved from the FB.21 using 1,620 hp (1,210 kW) single stage Packard Merlin 225s. Some 300 were built and another 37 converted to T.29 standard. 212 FB.40s were built by de Havilland Australia. Six were converted to PR.40; 28 to PR.41s, one to FB.42 and 22 to T.43 trainers. Most were powered by Packard-built Merlin 31 or 33s.

=== Trainers ===
The Mosquito was also built as the Mosquito T Mk.III two-seat trainer. This version, powered by two Rolls-Royce Merlin 21s, was unarmed and had a modified cockpit fitted with dual control arrangements. A total of 348 of the T Mk.III were built for the RAF and Fleet Air Arm. de Havilland Australia built 11 T Mk.43 trainers, similar to the Mk.III.

=== Torpedo-bombers ===
To meet specification N.15/44 for a navalised Mosquito for Royal Navy use as a torpedo bomber, de Havilland produced a carrier-borne variant. A Mosquito FB.VI was modified as a prototype designated Sea Mosquito TR Mk.33 with folding wings, arrester hook, thimble nose radome, Merlin 25 engines with four-bladed propellers and a new oleo-pneumatic landing gear rather than the standard rubber-in-compression gear. Initial carrier tests of the Sea Mosquito were carried out by Eric "Winkle" Brown aboard HMS Indefatigable, the first landing-on taking place on 25 March 1944. An order for 100 TR.33s was placed although only 50 were built at Leavesden. Armament was four 20 mm cannon, two 500 lb bombs in the bomb bay (another two could be fitted under the wings), eight 60 lb rockets (four under each wing) and a standard torpedo under the fuselage. The first production TR.33 flew on 10 November 1945. This series was followed by six Sea Mosquito TR Mk.37s, which were built at Chester (Broughton) and differed in having ASV Mk.XIII radar instead of the TR.33's AN/APS-6.

=== Target tugs ===
The RAF's target tug version was the Mosquito TT Mk.35, which were the last aircraft to remain in operational service with No 3 CAACU at Exeter, being finally retired in 1963. These aircraft were then featured in the film 633 Squadron. A number of B Mk.XVIs bombers were converted into TT Mk.39 target tug aircraft. The Royal Navy also operated the Mosquito TT Mk.39 for target towing. Two ex-RAF FB.6s were converted to TT.6 standard at Manchester (Ringway) Airport by Fairey Aviation in 1953–1954, and delivered to the Belgian Air Force for use as towing aircraft from the Sylt firing ranges.

=== Canadian-built ===
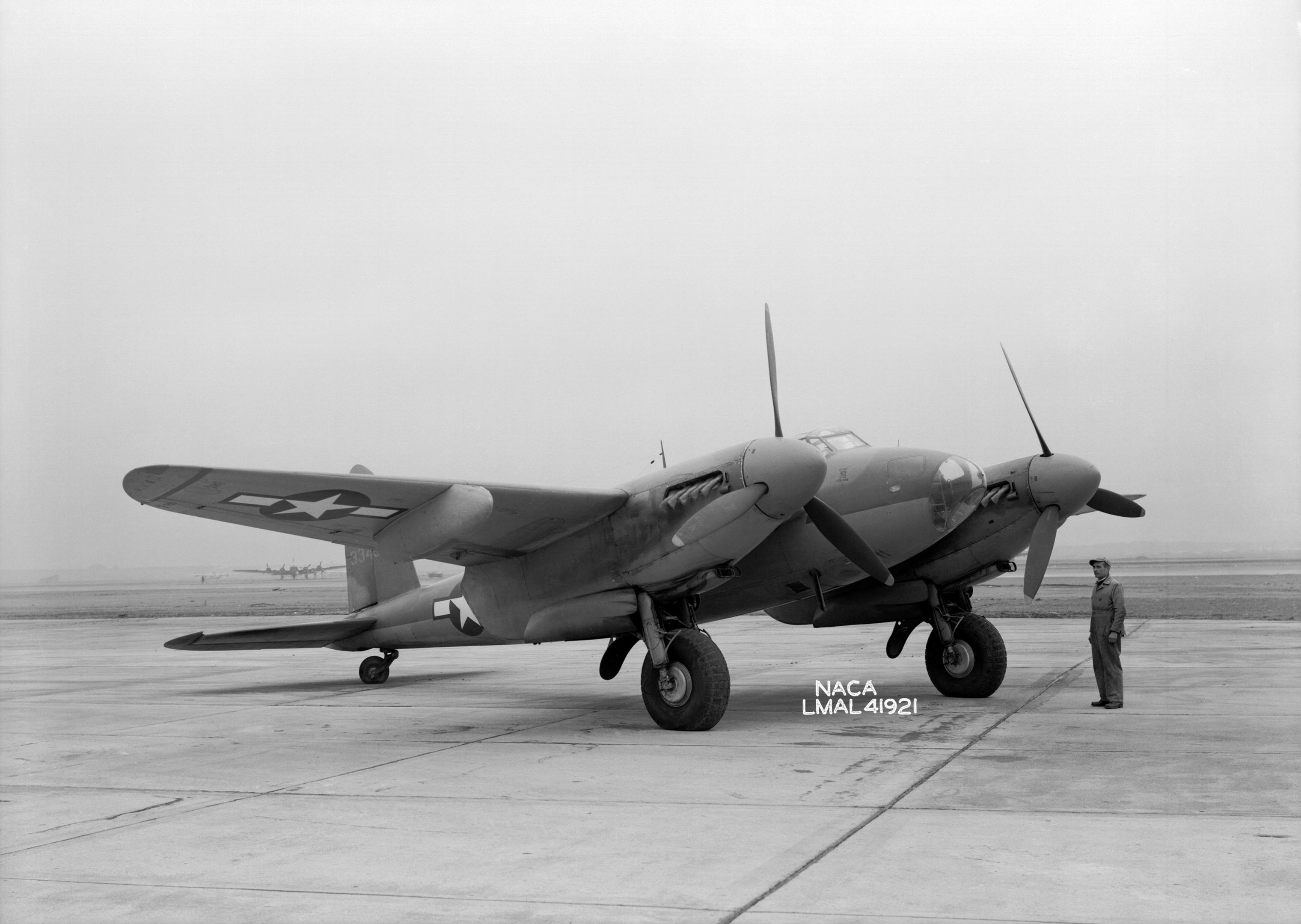
B Mk.XX, the Canadian version of B Mk.IV. One of the 40 USAAF F-8s.

A total of 1,032 (wartime + 2 afterwards) Mosquitoes were built by De Havilland Canada at Downsview Airfield in Downsview, Ontario (now Downsview Park in Toronto, Ontario).

- Mosquito B Mk.VII : Canadian version based on the Mosquito B Mk.V bomber aircraft. Powered by two 1,418 hp (1,057 kW) Packard Merlin 31 piston engines; 25 built.
- Mosquito B Mk.XX : Canadian version of the Mosquito B Mk.IV bomber aircraft; 145 built, of which 40 were converted into F-8 photo-reconnaissance aircraft for the USAAF.
- Mosquito FB Mk.21 : Canadian version of the Mosquito FB Mk. VI fighter-bomber aircraft. Powered by two 1,460 hp (1,090 kW) Rolls-Royce Merlin 31 piston engines, three built.
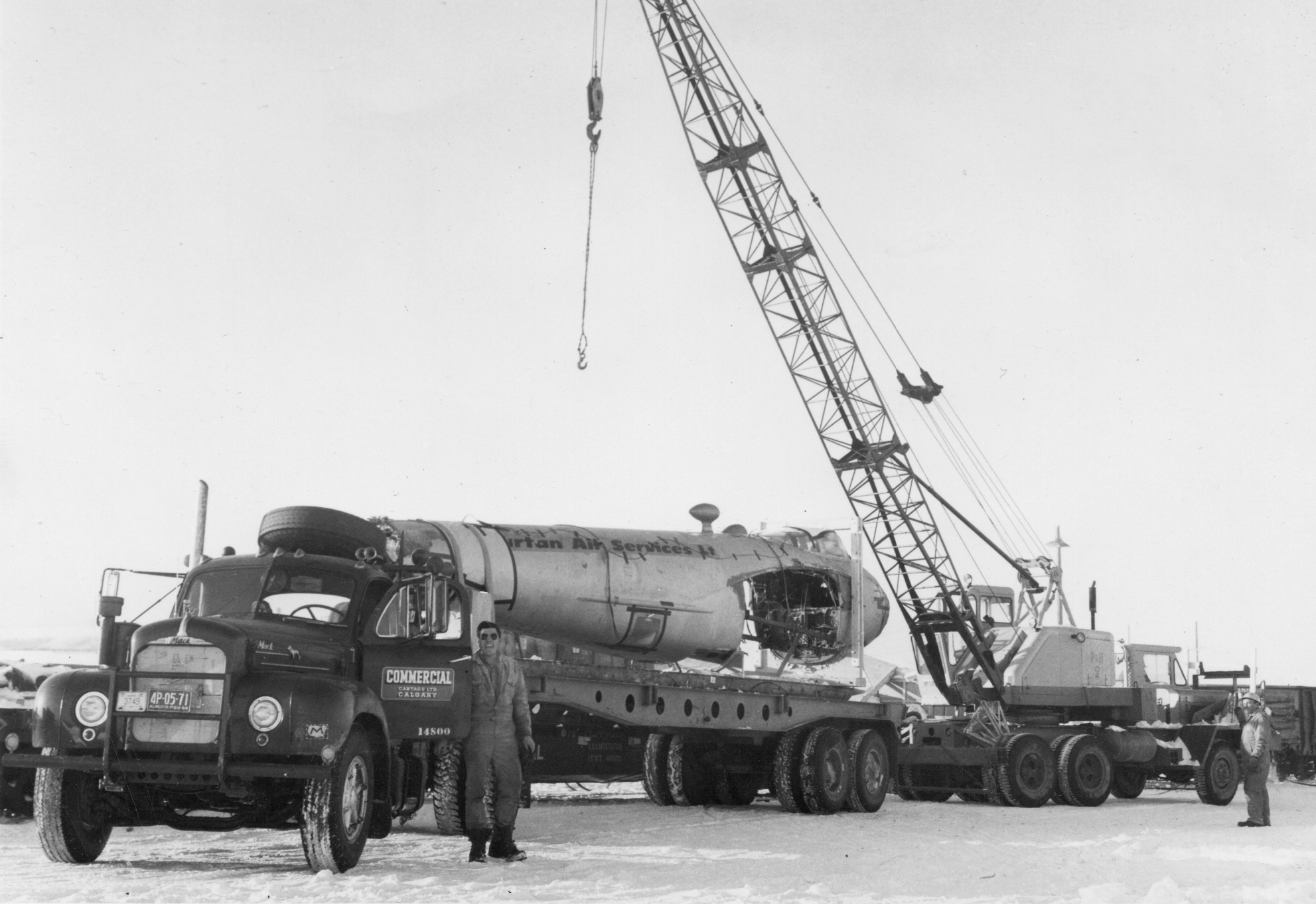
  Lynn Garrison Mosquito CF-HMS arrives in Calgary, February 1964
- Mosquito T Mk.22 : Canadian version of the Mosquito T Mk.III training aircraft.
- Mosquito B Mk.23 : Unused designation for a bomber variant.
- Mosquito FB Mk.24 : Canadian fighter-bomber version. Powered by two 1,620 hp (1,210 kW) Rolls-Royce Merlin 301 piston engines; two built.
- Mosquito B Mk.25 : Improved version of the Mosquito B Mk.XX Bomber aircraft. Powered by two 1,620 hp (1,210 kW) Packard Merlin 225 piston engines; 400 built.
- Mosquito FB Mk.26 : Improved version of the Mosquito FB Mk.21 fighter-bomber aircraft. Powered by two 1,620 hp (1,210 kW) Packard Merlin 225 piston engines; 338 built.
- Mosquito T Mk.27 : Canadian-built training aircraft.
- Mosquito T Mk.29 : A number of FB Mk.26 fighters were converted into T Mk.29 trainers.

=== Australian-built ===
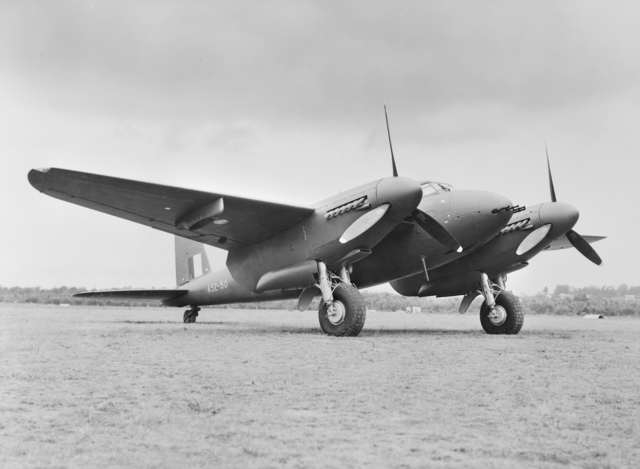
Mosquito FB Mk.40 A52-50.

- Mosquito FB Mk.40 : Two-seat fighter-bomber version for the RAAF. Powered by two 1,460 hp (1,090 kW) Rolls-Royce Merlin 31 piston engines. A total of 178 built in Australia.
- Mosquito PR Mk.40 : This designation was given to six FB Mk.40s, which were converted into photo-reconnaissance aircraft.
- Mosquito FB Mk.41 : Two-seat fighter-bomber version for the RAAF. A total of 11 were built in Australia.
- Mosquito PR Mk.41 : Two-seat photo-survey version for the RAAF. A total of 17 were built in Australia.
- Mosquito FB Mk.42 : Two-seat fighter-bomber version. Powered by two Rolls-Royce Merlin 69 piston engines. One FB Mk.40 aircraft was converted into a Mosquito FB Mk.42.
- Mosquito T Mk.43 : Two-seat training version for the RAAF. A total of 11 FB Mk.40s were converted into Mosquito T Mk.43s.

=== Highball ===
A number of Mosquito IVs were modified by Vickers-Armstrongs to carry Highball "bouncing bombs" and were allocated Vickers Type numbers:

- Type 463 – Prototype Highball conversion of Mosquito IV DZ741.
- Type 465 – Conversion of 33 Mosquito IVs to carry Highball.

== Production ==
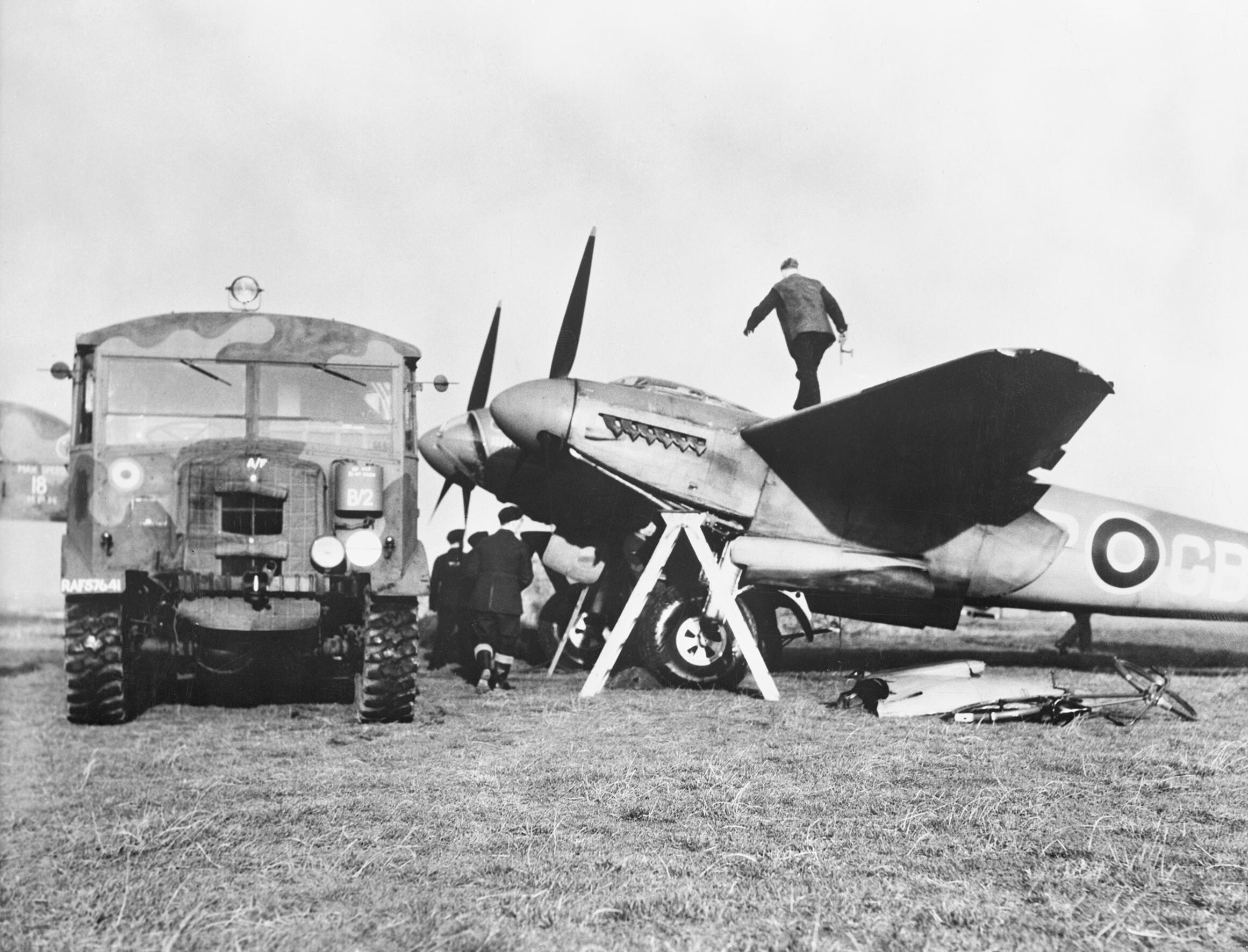
B Mk.IV DK336 of 105 Squadron being prepared for Operation Oyster, December 1942. This aircraft crashed near Shipham while returning from Cologne on 27 January 1943

About 5,000 of the total of 7,781 Mosquitoes built had major structural components fabricated from wood in High Wycombe, Buckinghamshire, England. The manufacture of fuselages, wings and tailplanes were made among a group of 20 furniture companies, including Austinsuite, E. Gomme, Harris Lebus, Parker Knoll, Parslow Furniture, Ronson, and Styles & Mealing. Wing spars were made by J. B. Heath and Dancer & Hearne. Many of the other parts, including flaps, flap shrouds, fins, leading edge assemblies and bomb doors were also produced in the Buckinghamshire town. Dancer & Hearne processed much of the wood from start to finish, receiving timber and transforming it into finished wing spars at their factory in Penn Street on the outskirts of High Wycombe.

As well as woodworking companies there was a diverse range of other British companies contributing components including Addis Brush, Claud Butler bicycles, Decca Records, Electrolux and Pye Radio. The Royal National Lifeboat Institution contributed rudder and tail fittings.

=== Supply of wood ===
The supply of wood was overseen by a section of the Ministry of Supply called Timber Control which was mobilized the day after war was declared. It was headquartered in the Clifton Down Hotel, near Bristol. They had representatives in Equatorial Africa, South America, and western Canada.

Initially much of the specialized yellow birch wood veneer and finished plywood used for the prototypes and early production aircraft was shipped from firms in the state of Wisconsin in the US. Prominent in this role were Roddis Plywood and Veneer Manufacturing in Marshfield. In conjunction with the USDA Forest Products Laboratory, Hamilton Roddis had developed new plywood adhesives and hot pressing technology. (Note: Local memories are of teams of young women ironing the (unusually thin) strong wood veneer before shipping to the UK.) Later on, paper birch was logged in large quantities from the interior of British Columbia along the Fraser and Quesnel Rivers and processed in Quesnel and New Westminster by the Pacific Veneer Company. According to the Quesnel archives, BC paper birch supplied ½ of the wartime British Empire birch used for Mosquitoes and other aircraft.

The Sitka spruce used in the main wing spars was sourced from British Columbia. European ash was used for the primary structure. The Douglas fir used in the wing's stringers was sourced from British Columbia and the Pacific Northwest of the United States.

As it only grew in Ecuador the supply of balsa was of particular concern as it was feared that demand would exceed the supply needed for the mass production of Mosquitoes. As a result they sent an agent to explore Colombia, Costa Rica, El Salvador, Guatemala, Honduras, Nicaragua, and Panama to source more. Limited supplies were discovered in Costa Rica and Colombia. A possible substitute was found in the Darién Province of Panama, called cuipo. Samples were sent to de Havilland who used them to construct an experimental fuselage which testing proved that it met the required standard. This led to a local workforce being hired and trained and a sawmill established by 1942 on an island in the Tuira River.

As concerns grew about the ability to transport Ecuadorian balsa to the United Kingdom due to the threat posed by U-boats in the Atlantic Ocean, the Ministry of Aircraft Production approved a research effort to supplant the balsa with calcium alginate foam, made from local brown algae. By 1944 the foam was ready, but the U-boat threat had been reduced, the larger B-25 bombers were in sufficient supply to handle most of the bombing raids, and the foam was not used in Mosquito production.

=== Canada ===
In July 1941, it was decided that DH Canada would build Mosquitoes at Downsview, Ontario. This was to continue even if Germany invaded Great Britain. Packard Merlin engines produced under licence were bench-tested by August and the first two aircraft were built in September. Production was to increase to fifty per month by early 1942. Initially, the Canadian production was for bomber variants; later, fighters, fighter-bombers and training aircraft were also made. DH Chief Production Engineer, Harry Povey, was sent first, then W. D. Hunter followed on an extended stay, to liaise with materials and parts suppliers. As was the case with initial UK production, Tego-bonded plywood and birch veneer was obtained from firms in Wisconsin, principally Roddis Plywood and Veneer Manufacturing, Marshfield. Enemy action delayed the shipping of jigs and moulds and it was decided to build these locally. (Note: A consequence was that Canada used concrete shell moulds right from the start, rather than the wooden moulds made by pattern makers in England.) During 1942, production improved to over 80 machines per month, as sub-contractors and suppliers became established. A mechanised production line based in part on car building methods started in 1944. As the war progressed, Canadian Mosquitoes may have utilized paper birch supplied by the Pacific Veneer Company of New Westminster using birch logs from the Cariboo, although records only say this birch was shipped to England for production there. When flight testing could no longer keep up, this was moved to the Central Aircraft Company airfield, London, Ontario, where the approved Mosquitoes left for commissioning and subsequent ferry transfer to Europe.

Ferrying Mosquitoes and many other types of WWII aircraft from Canada to Europe was dangerous, resulting in losses of lives and machines, but in the exigencies of war it was regarded as the best option for twin-engine and multi-engine aircraft. (Note: Rumours that were hard to credit circulated, including for example the theory of "auto-explosion".) Considerable efforts were made by de Havilland Canada to resolve problems with engine and oil systems and an additional five hours of flight testing were introduced before the ferry flight, but the actual cause of some of the losses was unknown. Nevertheless, by the end of the war, nearly 500 Mosquito bombers and fighter-bombers had been ferried successfully by the Canadian operation.

After DH Canada had been established for the Mosquito, further manufacturing was set up at DH Australia, in Sydney. One of the DH staff who travelled there was the distinguished test pilot, Pat Fillingham. These production lines added totals of 1,133 aircraft of varying types from Canada plus 212 aircraft from Australia. (Note: The latter were fighter-bomber variants, PR aircraft and trainers, all for use in the war against Japan. Aerial surveys of Australian territory continued with the PR types until 1953.)

=== Exports ===
In total, both during the war and after, de Havilland exported 46 FB.VIs and 29 PR. XVIs to Australia; two FB.VI and 18 NF.30s to Belgium; approximately 250 FB.26, T.29 and T.27s from Canada to China. A significant number never went into service due to deterioration on the voyage and to crashes during Chinese pilot training; however, five were captured by the People's Liberation Army during the Chinese Civil War; 19 FB.VIs to Czechoslovakia in 1948; 6 FB.VIs to Dominica; a few B.IVs, 57 FB.VIs, 29 PR.XVIs and 23 NF.30s to France. Some T.IIIs were exported to Israel along with 60 FB.VIs, and at least five PR.XVIs and 14 naval versions. Four T.IIIs, 76 FB.VIs, one FB.40 and four T.43s were exported to New Zealand. Three T.IIIs were exported to Norway, and 18 FB.VIs, which were later converted to night fighter standard. South Africa received two F.II and 14 PR.XVI/XIs and Sweden received 60 NF.XIXs. Turkey received 96 FB.VIs and several T.IIIs, and Yugoslavia had 60 NF.38s, 80 FB.VIs and three T.IIIs delivered. At least one de Havilland Mosquito was delivered to the Soviet Union, marked 'DK 296'.

=== Sites ===
Total Mosquito production was 7,781, of which 6,710 were built during the war.

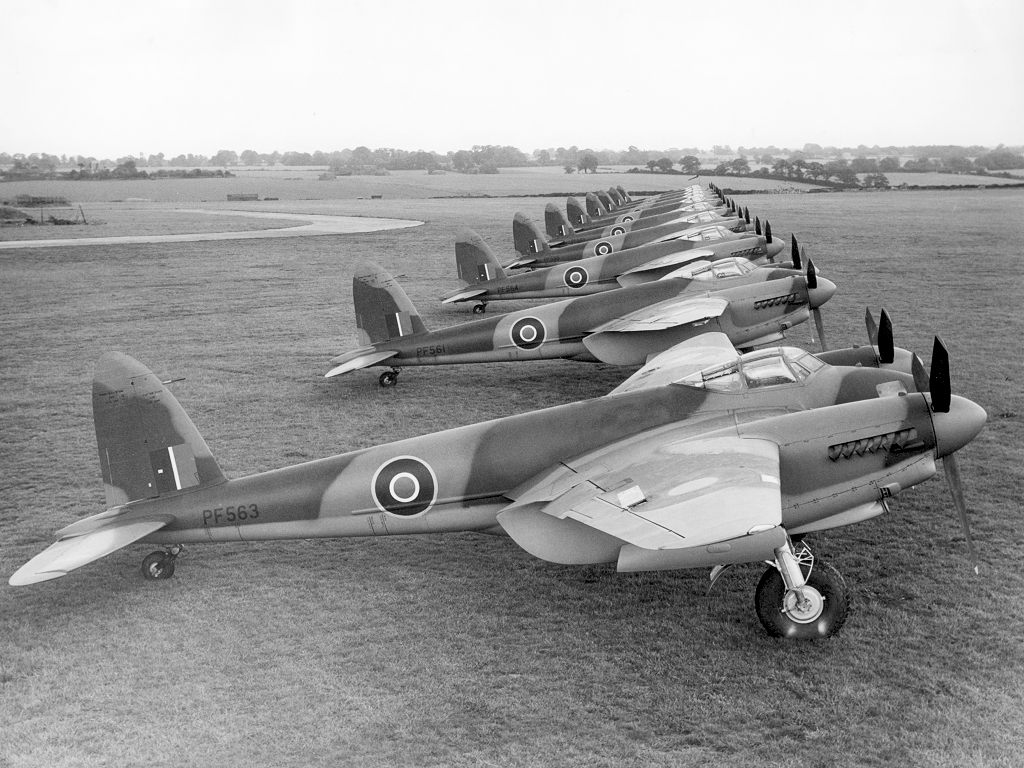
Factory-fresh Mosquito B.XVIs built by Percival: visible serial numbers are PF563, 561, 564, 565 and 562.

Producer and site	Number built
de Havilland Hatfield, Hertfordshire	3,326
de Havilland Leavesden, Hertfordshire	1,476
Standard Motor Company (Canley), Coventry	1,066
Percival Aircraft Company, Luton	245
Airspeed Aircraft, Portsmouth	122
de Havilland Hawarden, Chester (Note: A former Vickers-Armstrong shadow factory.)	88
de Havilland Canada, Toronto	1,076
de Havilland Australia, Sydney	212

== Civilian accidents and incidents ==
A number of Mosquitoes were lost in civilian airline service, mostly with British Overseas Airways Corporation during the Second World War.

- On 17 August 1943, G-AGGF crashed near Glenshee, Perthshire.
- On 25 October 1943, G-AGGG crashed near RAF Leuchars.
- On 3 January 1944, G-AGGD stalled on landing at Såtenäs, Sweden, and was written off.
- On 19 August 1944, G-AGKP crashed into the North Sea off Leuchars, Fife. All three people on board were killed.
- On 29 August 1944, G-AGKR disappeared on a flight from Göteborg, Sweden, to RAF Leuchars with the loss of both crew members.

On 21 July 1996, Mosquito G-ASKH, wearing the markings of RR299, crashed 1 mile west of Manchester Barton Airport. Pilot Kevin Moorhouse and engineer Steve Watson were both killed in the crash. At the time, this was the last airworthy Mosquito, a T.III.

== Operators ==
- Australia
- Belgium
- Canada
- Republic of China
- China
- Czechoslovakia
- Dominican Republic
- France
- Haiti
- India
- Israel
- Netherlands
- New Zealand
- Norway
- Poland
- South Africa
- USSR
- Sweden
- Switzerland
- Turkey
- United Kingdom
- United States
- Venezuela
- Yugoslavia

== Surviving aircraft ==
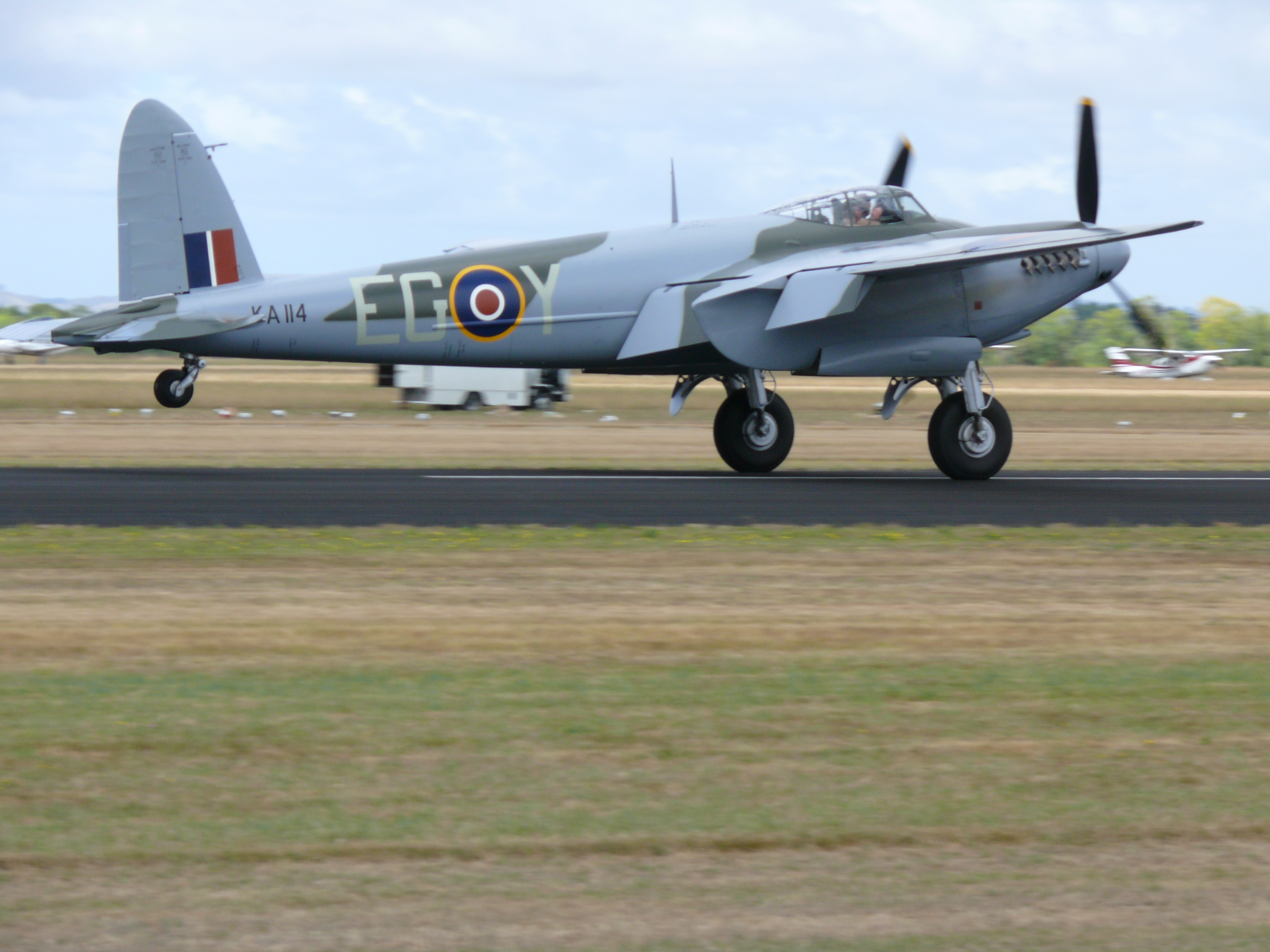
De Havilland Mosquito KA114 at the "Wings over Wairarapa" Airshow, Masterton, New Zealand (January 2013)

There are approximately 30 non-flying Mosquitoes around the world with five airworthy examples: three in the United States; one in Canada; and one in New Zealand. The largest collection of Mosquitoes is at the de Havilland Aircraft Museum in the United Kingdom, which owns three aircraft, including the first prototype, W4050, the only initial prototype of a Second World War British aircraft design still in existence in the 21st century.

== Specifications (B Mk.XVI) ==
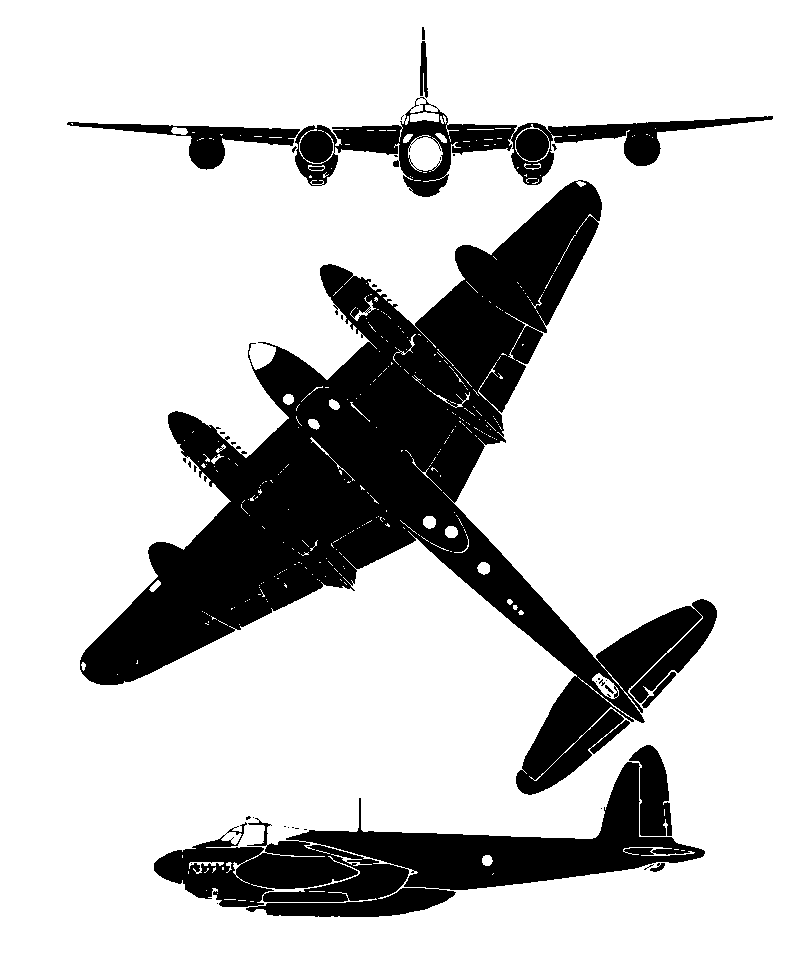
Mosquito P.R.34.

Data from Jane's Fighting Aircraft of World War II, World War II Warbirds

General characteristics

- Crew: Two: pilot, bomb aimer/navigator
- Length: 44 ft 6 in (13.56 m)
- Wingspan: 54 ft 2 in (16.51 m)
- Height: 17 ft 5 in (5.31 m)
- Wing area: 454 sq ft (42.2 m^{2})
- Airfoil: RAF 34 (modified)
- Empty weight: 14,300 lb (6,486 kg)
- Gross weight: 18,100 lb (8,210 kg)
- Max takeoff weight: 25,000 lb (11,340 kg)
- Powerplant: 2 × Rolls-Royce Merlin V-12 liquid-cooled piston engine, 1,710 hp (1,280 kW) each -76 driving the left propeller, -77 driving right
- Propellers: 3-bladed constant-speed propellers

Performance

- Maximum speed: 415 mph (668 km/h, 361 kn) at 28,000 ft (8,500 m)
- Range: 1,300 mi (2,100 km, 1,100 nmi)
- Service ceiling: 37,000 ft (11,000 m)
- Rate of climb: 2,850 ft/min (14.5 m/s)
- Wing loading: 39.9 lb/sq ft (195 kg/m^{2})
- Power/mass: 0.189 hp/lb (0.311 kW/kg)

Armament

- Guns: 4 × 7.7 mm Browning machine guns, 4 × 20 mm Hispano cannons
- Bombs: 4,000 lb (1,800 kg)

Avionics

- GEE radio-navigation

== See also ==
Notable Mosquito missions

- Oslo Mosquito raids
- Operation Jericho
- Operation Carthage
- Aarhus air raid

Related development

- de Havilland Hornet/Sea Hornet
- I.Ae. 24 Calquin

Aircraft of comparable role, configuration, and era

- Bristol Beaufighter
- Lioré et Olivier LeO 45
- Douglas P-70 Havoc
- Focke-Wulf Ta 154 Moskito
- Heinkel He 219
- Junkers Ju 88
- Kawasaki Ki-102
- Lockheed F-4/F-5 Lightning
- Lockheed PV-1 Ventura
- Martin Baltimore
- Messerschmitt Me 410 Hornisse
- Northrop P-61 Black Widow/Northrop F-15 Reporter
- Nakajima J1N
- Petlyakov Pe-2
- Tupolev Tu-2
- Saab 18
- Vickers Type 432
- Westland Whirlwind (fighter)

Related lists

- List of aircraft of World War II
- List of aircraft of the United Kingdom in World War II
- List of fighter aircraft
- List of bomber aircraft
