= Fabienne Dervain =

- Born: 1989 (age 36–37)
- Education: American University of Paris King's College London
- Occupation: Entrepreneur
- Website: www.couleurcafe.ci

Fabienne Dervain is the CEO of Couleur Cafe, a coffee business in Abidjan, Côte d'Ivoire previously owned by her mother.

== Early life ==
Fabienne Dervain was born in Abidjan in Ivory Coast. When she was 13 years old, she was sent to boarding school in France because of the political unrest in Ivory Coast.

== Education ==
She got her BA in International Business Administration from the American University of Paris in 2010 and proceeded to King's College London where she graduated with a MSc in International Management in 2012.

== Career ==
Couleur Café was originally opened in year 2000 by Dervain’s mother. The cafe was going out of business in 2012, and she decided to return home to grow the business. The new Couleur Café was opened on the 28th of August in 2013. Her work was to restart the business with $60,500 from her personal savings and contributions from members of her family. Her sister, an interior designer did the redecoration of the place.

== Recognitions ==
She was featured in the second episode of BBC's New Generation of Women Entrepreneurs in Africa in January 2016 which was co-produced with the Bill & Melinda Gates Foundation. She was also featured in BBC's Women of Africa series in May 2016, where she talked about running her business and the challenges encountered.
