= Olivia de Havilland =

British actress (1916–2020)

Dame Olivia de Havilland DBE
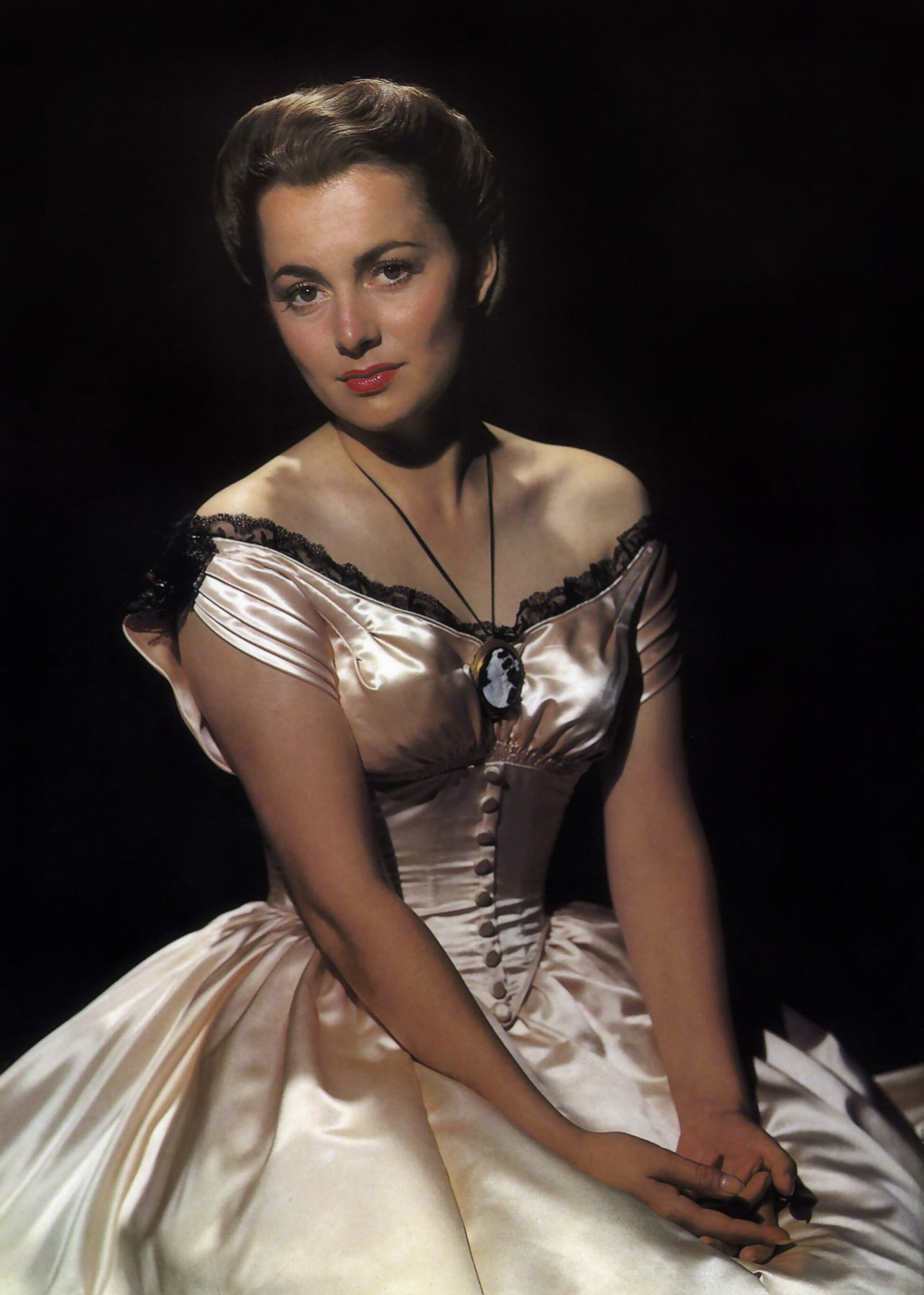
- De Havilland in 1940
- Born: Olivia Mary de Havilland; July 1, 1916; Tokyo City, Empire of Japan
- Died: July 26, 2020 (aged 104); Paris, France
- Resting place: Pere Lachaise Cemetery
- Other names: Olivia Fontaine; Livvie
- Citizenship: United Kingdom (at birth); United States (after 1941); France (after 1955)
- Occupation: Actress
- Years active: 1933–2010
- Spouses: Marcus Goodrich (m. 1946; div. 1953) Pierre Galante (m. 1955; div. 1979)
- Children: 2
- Parents: Walter de Havilland (father); Lilian Fontaine (mother)
- Relatives: Joan Fontaine (sister); Hereward de Havilland (cousin); Geoffrey de Havilland (cousin)
- Awards

Dame Olivia Mary de Havilland (/də ˈhævɪlənd/; July 1, 1916 – July 26, 2020) was a British, American and French actress. She appeared in 49 feature films throughout her career, with the major works of her cinematic career spanning from 1935 to 1988. Before her death in 2020 at the age of 104, she was the oldest living and earliest surviving Academy Award winner and was one of the last surviving major stars from the Golden Age of Hollywood cinema. Her younger sister, with whom she had a noted rivalry that was well documented in the media, was the Oscar-winning actress Joan Fontaine.

De Havilland first came to prominence with Errol Flynn as a screen couple in adventure films such as Captain Blood (1935) and The Adventures of Robin Hood (1938). One of her best-known roles is that of Melanie Hamilton in Gone with the Wind (1939), for which she received the first of her five Oscar nominations, the only one for Best Supporting Actress.

In the 1940s, De Havilland departed from ingénue roles and distinguished herself for performances in Hold Back the Dawn (1941), To Each His Own (1946), The Snake Pit (1948) and The Heiress (1949), receiving four Best Actress nominations and winning for To Each His Own and The Heiress. She was also successful in work on stage and television. From the 1950s, de Havilland lived in Paris and received honors such as the National Medal of the Arts, the Légion d'honneur, and the appointment to Dame Commander of the Order of the British Empire at the age of 101.

In addition to her film career, de Havilland continued her work in the theater, appearing three times on Broadway, in Romeo and Juliet (1951), Candida (1952) and A Gift of Time (1962). She also worked in television, appearing in the successful miniseries Roots: The Next Generations (1979) and Anastasia: The Mystery of Anna (1986), for which she received a Primetime Emmy Award nomination and won the Golden Globe Award for Best Supporting Actress in a Television Movie or Series. During her film career, de Havilland collected two New York Film Critics Circle Awards, the National Board of Review Award for Best Actress and the Venice Film Festival Volpi Cup. For her contributions to the motion picture industry, she received a star on the Hollywood Walk of Fame. She and her sister remain the only siblings to have won major acting Academy Awards.

== Early life ==
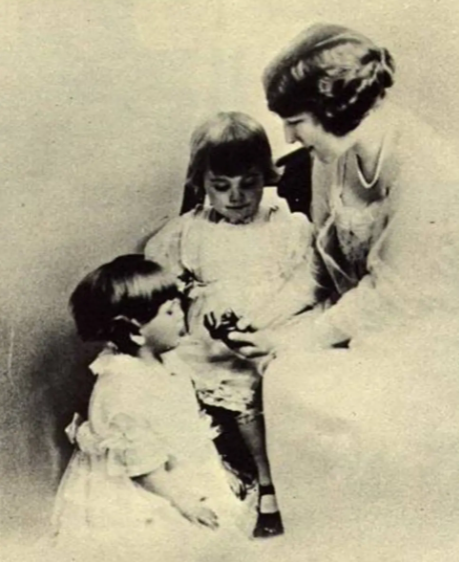
De Havilland with mother Lilian Fontaine and sister Joan Fontaine (left) c. 1922

By birth, Olivia was a member of the de Havilland family, which belonged to British landed gentry that had originated from mainland Normandy. Her mother Lilian Fontaine (née Ruse; 1886‍–‍1975) was educated at the Royal Academy of Dramatic Art in London and became a stage actress. She also sang with Sir Walter Parratt, who was Master of the King's Music, and she toured the United Kingdom with the composer Ralph Vaughan Williams. Olivia's father Walter de Havilland (1872‍–‍1968) served as an English professor at Tokyo Imperial University before becoming a patent attorney. Her paternal cousin was Sir Geoffrey de Havilland (1882‍–‍1965), an aircraft designer and founder of the de Havilland aircraft company.

Walter and Lilian met in Japan in 1913 and married the following year; it was not a happy marriage, owing in part to Walter's infidelities. Olivia Mary de Havilland was born on July 1, 1916. The family moved into a large house in Tokyo City, where Lilian gave informal singing recitals. Olivia's younger sister Joan (Joan de Beauvoir de Havilland)‍—‌later known as actress Joan Fontaine‍—‌was born on October 22, 1917, when Olivia was 15 months old. Both sisters became British subjects automatically by birthright.

In February 1919, Lilian persuaded her husband to take the family back to Britain, as its climate was better suited to their ailing daughters. They sailed aboard the SS Siberia Maru to San Francisco, where the family stopped to treat Olivia's tonsillitis. Joan developed pneumonia, so Lilian decided to remain with her daughters in California, and they eventually settled in the village of Saratoga, 50 miles (80 km) south of San Francisco. (Note: After living in an apartment near Golden Gate Park while the sisters were being treated, the family moved to San Jose and stayed at the Hotel Vendome. Soon after, they moved to the foothills of the Santa Cruz Mountains, where they stayed at a boarding house called Lundblad's Lodge on Oak Street owned by a Swedish family.) Walter abandoned the family and returned to his Japanese housekeeper, who eventually became his second wife.

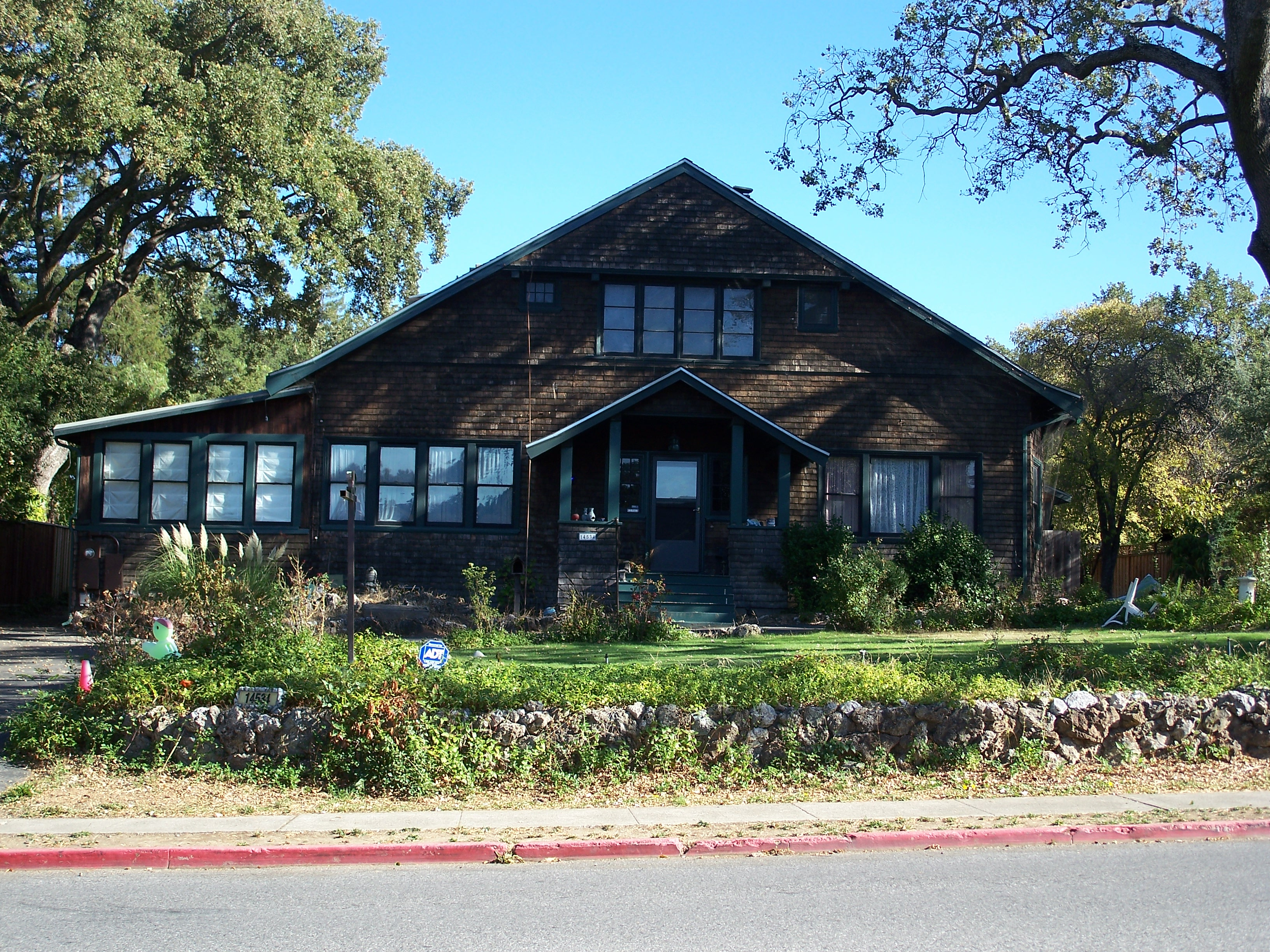
Lundblad's Lodge in Saratoga, where the family lived for a while

Olivia was raised to appreciate the arts, beginning with ballet lessons at the age of four and piano lessons a year later. She learned to read before she was six, and her mother, who occasionally taught drama, music and elocution, had her recite passages from Shakespeare to strengthen her diction. (Note: Olivia was named after a character in Twelfth Night.) During this period, Olivia's sister first started calling her "Livvie", a nickname that lasted throughout her life. De Havilland entered Saratoga Grammar School in 1922 and did well in her studies. She enjoyed reading, writing poetry and drawing, and once represented her grammar school in a county spelling bee, finishing in second place. Lilian had a new Tudor-style house built in 1923, and the family resided there until the early 1930s. In April 1925, after her divorce was finalized, Lilian married George Milan Fontaine, a department-store manager for O. A. Hale and Co. in San Jose. Fontaine was a respectable businessman and a good provider, but his strict parenting style generated animosity and later rebellion in both of his new stepdaughters. (Note: Lilian and George were introduced to each other in 1920 by four-year-old Olivia, who noticed him sitting on a park bench and referred to him in Japanese as "Daddy".)

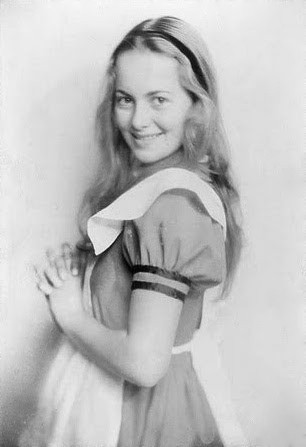
De Havilland in the stage play Alice in Wonderland, 1933

De Havilland continued her education at Los Gatos High School near her home in Saratoga. There, she excelled in oratory and field hockey and participated in school plays and the school drama club, eventually becoming the club's secretary. With plans of becoming a schoolteacher in English and speech, she also attended Notre Dame Convent in Belmont.

In 1933, a teenaged de Havilland made her amateur theater debut in Alice in Wonderland, a production of the Saratoga Community Players based on the novel by Lewis Carroll. She appeared in several school plays, including The Merchant of Venice and Hansel and Gretel. Her passion for drama eventually led to a confrontation with her stepfather, who forbade her from participating in further extracurricular activities. When he learned that she had won the lead role of Elizabeth Bennet in a school fund-raising production of Jane Austen's Pride and Prejudice, he told her that she had to choose between staying at home or appearing in the production and not being allowed home. Not wanting to let her school and classmates down, she left home and moved in with a family friend.

After graduating from high school in 1934, de Havilland was offered a scholarship to Mills College in Oakland to pursue her chosen career as an English teacher. She was also offered the role of Puck in the Saratoga Community Theater production of Shakespeare's A Midsummer Night's Dream. That summer, Austrian director Max Reinhardt came to California for a major new production of the same play due to premiere at the Hollywood Bowl. One of Reinhardt's assistants saw de Havilland performing in Saratoga, and he offered her the second understudy position for the role of Hermia. One week before the premiere, the understudy Jean Rouverol and the lead actress Gloria Stuart both left the project, leaving 18-year-old de Havilland to play Hermia. Impressed with her performance, Reinhardt offered her the part in the four-week autumn tour that followed. During the tour, Reinhardt received word that he was to direct the Warner Bros. film version of his stage production, and he offered de Havilland the film role of Hermia. She initially wavered, with her mind still set on becoming a teacher, but Reinhardt and executive producer Henry Blanke eventually persuaded her to sign a five-year contract with Warner Bros. on November 12, 1934, with a starting salary of $200 a week (equivalent to $4,800 in 2025), marking the beginning of a professional acting career that would span more than 50 years.

== Career ==
=== 1935–1937: Early films ===
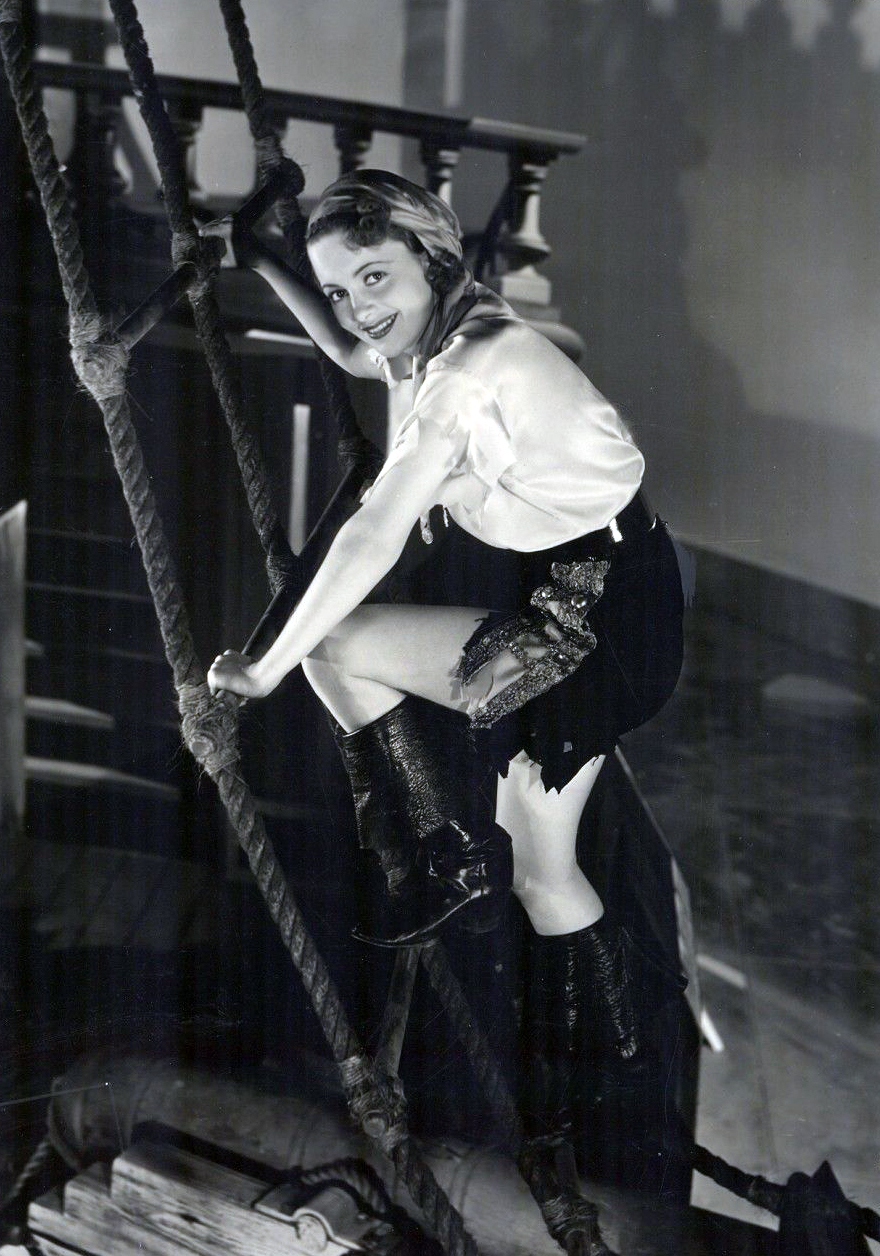
Publicity photo, 1935

De Havilland made her screen debut in Reinhardt's A Midsummer Night's Dream (1935), which was filmed at Warner Bros.' studios from December 19, 1934, to March 9, 1935. During the production, de Havilland picked up film-acting techniques from the film's co-director William Dieterle and camera techniques from cinematographer Hal Mohr, who was impressed with her questions about his work. By the end of filming, she had learned the effect of lighting and camera angles on how she appeared on screen and how to find her best lighting. Following premieres in New York City and Beverly Hills, the film was released on October 30, 1935. Despite the publicity campaign, the film generated little enthusiasm with audiences. While the critical response was mixed, de Havilland's performance was praised by The San Francisco Examiner critic. In his review in the Brooklyn Daily Eagle, Winston Burdett wrote that she "acts graciously and does greater justice to Shakespeare's language than anyone else in the cast". Two minor comedies followed, Alibi Ike (1935) with Joe E. Brown and The Irish in Us (1935) with James Cagney. In both films, she played the sweet and charming love interest‍—‌a role into which she would later become typecast. After the experience of being a Reinhardt player, de Havilland felt disappointed being assigned these routine heroine roles. In March, de Havilland and her mother moved into an apartment at the Chateau des Fleurs at 6626 Franklin Avenue in Hollywood.

Although Warner Bros. studio had assumed that the many costumed films that studios such as MGM had earlier produced would never succeed during the years of the Great Depression in the United States, they nonetheless took a chance by producing Captain Blood (1935). The film is a swashbuckler action drama based on the novel by Rafael Sabatini and directed by Michael Curtiz. Captain Blood starred a then-little-known contract bit-part actor and former extra Errol Flynn with the equally little-known de Havilland. According to film historian Tony Thomas, both actors had "classic good looks, cultured speaking voices, and a sense of distant aristocracy about them". Filmed between August 5 and October 29, 1935, Captain Blood gave de Havilland the opportunity to appear in her first costumed historical romance and adventure epic, a genre to which she was well suited, given her beauty and elegance.

In the film, she played Arabella Bishop, the niece of a Jamaica plantation owner who purchases at auction an Irish physician wrongly condemned to servitude. The on-screen chemistry between de Havilland and Flynn was evident from their first scenes together, where clashes between her character's spirited hauteur and his character's playful braggadocio did not mask their mutual attraction. (Note: The on-screen attraction of the characters reflected the actual feelings of the actors at the time. De Havilland would later admit that she had a crush on Flynn through the entire production, and he would later acknowledge the same.) Arabella is a feisty young woman who knows what she wants and is willing to fight for it. The bantering tone of their exchanges in the film‍—‌the healthy give-and-take and mutual respect‍—‌became the basis for their on-screen relationship in subsequent films. Captain Blood was released on December 28, 1935, and received good reviews and wide public appeal. De Havilland's performance was singled out in The New York Times and Variety. The film was nominated for four Academy Awards, including Best Picture. The popular success of the film, as well as the critical response to the on-screen couple, led to seven additional collaborations: The Charge of the Light Brigade (1936), The Adventures of Robin Hood (1938), Four's a Crowd (1938), Dodge City (1939), The Private Lives of Elizabeth and Essex (1939, although de Havilland played a supporting role with Bette Davis as Flynn's leading lady), Santa Fe Trail (1940) and They Died with Their Boots On (1941).

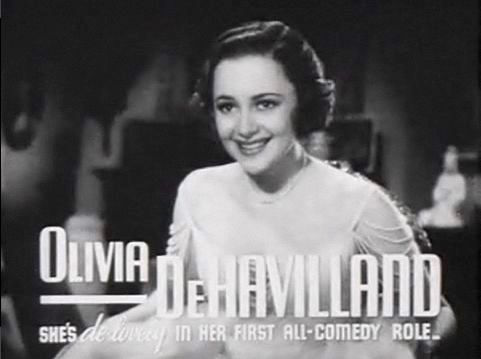
In Call It a Day, 1937

De Havilland appeared in Mervyn LeRoy's historical drama Anthony Adverse (1936) with Fredric March. Based on the popular novel by Hervey Allen, the film follows the adventures of an orphan raised by a Scottish merchant whose pursuit of fortune separates him from the innocent peasant girl he loves, marries and eventually loses. De Havilland played a peasant girl, Angela, who after being separated from her slave-trader husband, becomes opera star Mademoiselle Georges, the mistress of Napoleon. The film earned six Academy Award nominations, including Best Picture. It garnered de Havilland good exposure and the opportunity to portray a character as she develops over time. Howard Barnes of the New York Herald Tribune found her later scenes as Mademoiselle Georges "not very credible", but Frank S. Nugent of The New York Times called her "a winsome Angela". That same year, she was reunited with Flynn in Michael Curtiz's period action film The Charge of the Light Brigade (1936), featuring Flynn look-alike Patric Knowles (playing Flynn's brother) and David Niven. The picture was set during the Crimean War and became a major box-office hit. During the film's production, de Havilland renegotiated her contract with Warner Bros. and signed a seven-year contract on April 14, 1936, with a starting weekly salary of $500 (equivalent to $11,600 in 2025). (Note: De Havilland hired the Ivan Kahn Agency to represent her in the contract negotiations with Warner Bros. The contract she signed provided for yearly increases in her weekly salary, starting at $500 and then increasing to $750, $1000, $1250, $1500, $2000, and $2500 in her last year (equivalent to $60,200 in 2025).) Toward the end of the year, 20-year-old de Havilland and her mother moved to 2337 Nella Vista Avenue in the Los Feliz section of Los Angeles.

De Havilland had her first top billing in Archie Mayo's comedy Call It a Day (1937), about a middle-class English family struggling with the romantic effects of spring fever during the course of a single day. De Havilland played daughter Catherine Hilton, who falls in love with the handsome artist hired to paint her portrait. The film did not do well at the box office and did little to advance her career. She fared better in Mayo's screwball comedy It's Love I'm After (1937) with Leslie Howard and Bette Davis. De Havilland played Marcia West, a debutante and theater fan enamored with a Barrymore-like matinee idol who decides to help the girl's fiancé by pretending to be an abominable cad. The film received good reviews, with Variety calling it "fresh, clever, excellently directed and produced, and acted by an ensemble that clicks from start to finish" and praising de Havilland.

Also released during 1937 was another period film with de Havilland, beginning with The Great Garrick, a fictional romantic comedy about the 18th-century English actor's encounter with jealous players from the Comédie-Française, who plot to embarrass him on his way to Paris. Wise to their prank, Garrick plays along with the ruse, determined to get the last laugh, even on a lovely young aristocrat, de Havilland's Germaine Dupont, whom he mistakenly believes to be one of the players. With her refined demeanor and diction, de Havilland delivers a performance that is "lighthearted and thoroughly believable", according to Judith Kass. Variety praised the film, calling it "a production of superlative workmanship". Despite the positive reviews, the film did not do as well at the box office. (Note: During the production, Brian Aherne found de Havilland "young and entrancing" and organized her 21st birthday party on the set. They also dated during the making of the picture. He later wrote, "I little thought that I would one day marry her younger sister, Joan Fontaine." Aherne and Fontaine married two years later, on August 19, 1939.) The Michael Curtiz-directed romantic drama Gold Is Where You Find It is a film about the late 19th-century conflict in the Sacramento Valley between gold miners and their hydraulic equipment and farmers whose land is being flooded. De Havilland played the daughter of a farmer, Serena Ferris, who falls in love with the mining engineer responsible for the flooding portrayed by George Brent. The picture also stars Claude Rains. The film was released in February 1938, and was her first appearance in a Technicolor film but not her last. She would make three more Technicolor films within the next two years, two of which would arguably remain her most fondly remembered by audiences across the decades since their release.

=== 1938–1940: Movie stardom ===
In September 1937, de Havilland was selected by Warner Bros. studio head Jack L. Warner to play Maid Marian in The Adventures of Robin Hood (1938) opposite Errol Flynn. The principal photography for this Technicolor production took place between September 26, 1937, and January 14, 1938, including location work at Bidwell Park, Busch Gardens in Pasadena, and Lake Sherwood in California. Directed by William Keighley and Michael Curtiz, the film is about the legendary Saxon knight who opposes the corrupt and brutal Prince John and his Norman lords, while good King Richard is away fighting in the Third Crusade. The king's ward Maid Marian initially opposes Robin Hood, but she later supports him after learning his true intentions of helping his oppressed people. Far from being a mere bystander, Marian risks her life to save Robin by providing his men with a plan for his escape. As defined by de Havilland, Marian is both a beautiful fairy-tale heroine and a spirited, intelligent woman "whose actions are governed by her mind as well as her heart", according to author Judith Kass. Released on May 14, 1938, The Adventures of Robin Hood was an immediate critical and commercial success, earning an Academy Award nomination for Best Picture. It went on to become one of the most popular adventure films of the Classical Hollywood era.

The film's success raised de Havilland's status, but this was not reflected in her subsequent film assignments at Warner Bros.; her next several roles were more routine and less challenging. In the romantic comedy Four's a Crowd (1938), she played Lorri Dillingwell, a flighty rich girl being romanced by a conniving public relations man looking to land an account with her eccentric grandfather. In Ray Enright's romantic comedy Hard to Get (1938), she played another frivolous rich girl, Margaret Richards, whose desire to exact revenge on a gas station attendant leads to her own comeuppance. In the summer of 1938, she portrayed the love interest between two U.S. Navy pilot brothers in Wings of the Navy, released in early 1939. While de Havilland was certainly capable of playing this type of character, her personality was better suited to stronger and more dramatic roles, according to Judith Kass. By this time, she was having serious doubts about her career at Warner Bros.

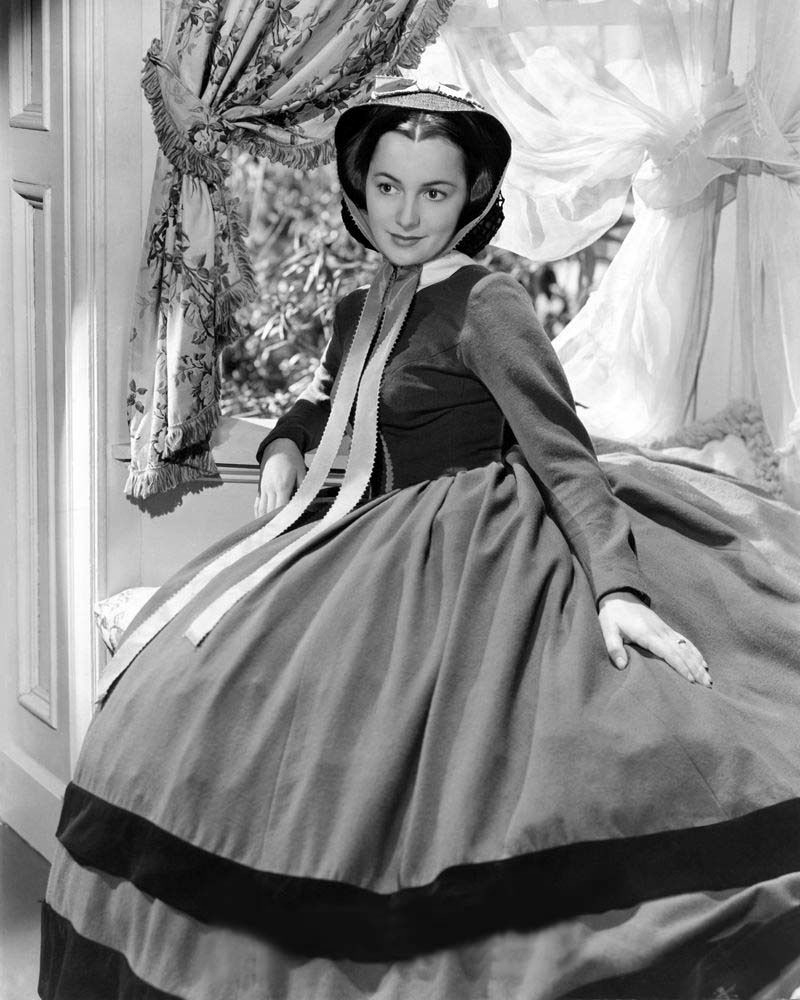
Studio publicity portrait for Gone with the Wind, 1939

Some film scholars consider 1939 to be the high point of the golden age of Classic Cinema, producing award-winning box-office hits in many genres, including the Western. (Note: Following the success of Cecil B. DeMille's epic adventure The Plainsman (1937), studios began investing their top talent and budgets to produce films such as Stagecoach, Union Pacific, and Destry Rides Again‍—‌all released in 1939.) Warner Bros. produced Michael Curtiz's Technicolor adventure Dodge City (1939), which was Flynn and de Havilland's first Western film. Set during the American Civil War, the film is about a Texas trailblazer who witnesses the brutal lawlessness of Dodge City, Kansas, and becomes sheriff to clean up the town. De Havilland played Abbie Irving, whose initial hostility towards Flynn's character Wade Hatton is transformed by events, and the two fall in love‍—‌by now a proven formula for their on-screen relationships. Curtiz's action sequences, Sol Polito's cinematography, Max Steiner's expansive film score, and perhaps the "definitive saloon brawl in movie history" all contributed to the film's success. Variety described the film as "a lusty western, packed with action". For de Havilland, playing yet another supporting love interest in a limited role, Dodge City represented the emotional low point of her career to that point. She later said, "I was in such a depressed state that I could hardly remember my lines."

In a letter to a colleague dated November 18, 1938, film producer David O. Selznick wrote, "I would give anything if we had Olivia de Havilland under contract to us so that we could cast her as Melanie." The film he was preparing to shoot was the Technicolor epic Gone with the Wind, but Jack L. Warner was unwilling to lend her out for the project. While most other actresses wanted the Scarlett O'Hara role, de Havilland had read the novel and wanted to play Melanie Hamilton‍—‌a character whose quiet dignity and inner strength she understood and felt she could bring to life on the screen.

De Havilland turned to Warner's wife Anne for help. Warner later recalled: "Olivia, who had a brain like a computer concealed behind those fawn-like eyes, simply went to my wife and they joined forces to change my mind." He relented, and de Havilland was signed to the project a few weeks before the start of principal photography on January 26, 1939. Set in the American South during the Civil War and Reconstruction eras, the film is about Scarlett O'Hara—the strong-willed daughter of a Georgia plantation owner—who is in love with the husband of her sister-in-law Melanie, whose kindness stands in sharp contrast to those around her. According to film historian Tony Thomas, de Havilland's skillful and subtle performance effectively presents this character of selfless love and quiet strength in a way that keeps her vital and interesting throughout the film. Gone with the Wind had its world premiere in Atlanta, Georgia, on December 15, 1939, and was well received. Frank S. Nugent of The New York Times wrote that de Havilland's Melanie "is a gracious, dignified, tender gem of characterization", and John C. Flinn Sr. in Variety called her "a standout". The film won 10 Academy Awards, including Best Picture, and de Havilland received her first nomination for Best Supporting Actress.

Melanie was someone different. She had very, deeply feminine qualities ... that I felt were very endangered at that time, and they are from generation to generation, and that somehow they should be kept alive, and ... that's why I wanted to interpret her role. ... The main thing is that she was always thinking of the other person, and the interesting thing to me is that she was a happy person ... loving, compassionate.

— Olivia de Havilland

Within days of completing her work in Gone with the Wind in June 1939, de Havilland returned to Warner Bros. to begin filming Michael Curtiz's historical drama The Private Lives of Elizabeth and Essex (1939) with Bette Davis and Errol Flynn. She had hoped her work on Selznick's prestige picture would lead to first-rate roles at Warner Bros., but instead, she received third billing below the title as the queen's lady-in-waiting. In early September, she was lent out to Samuel Goldwyn Productions for Sam Wood's romantic caper film Raffles (1939) with David Niven, about a high-society cricketer and jewel thief. She later complained, "I had nothing to do with that style of film."

During the late 1930s, de Havilland made appearances on radio programs such as Hollywood Hotel. Decades later, one of the regular actresses on that show, Lurene Tuttle, stated in an interview that de Havilland even did the voice of a dog when she guest-starred.

The soundman was supposed to do a little yipping, yappy dog, like a terrier. He sounded like a Newfoundland dog or something, and the director kept saying "That won't do." So, Olivia de Havilland was sitting next to me, and she says, "I can do a very good dog." And I said, "Well, I don't think they'll let you do a dog. This is an audience show; you're a star, you can't do a dog." And Olivia says, "I'm going to do it." So she went over to the director, went into the booth and said, "I'd like to try doing this dog for you." So, they put her behind the screen, and she went on the show, and she did that yipping dog."

In early 1940, de Havilland refused to appear in several films assigned to her, initiating the first of her suspensions from the studio. She did agree to play in Curtis Bernhardt's musical comedy drama My Love Came Back (1940) with Jeffrey Lynn and Eddie Albert, who played a classical music student turned swing jazz bandleader. De Havilland played violinist Amelia Cornell, whose life becomes complicated by the support of a wealthy sponsor. (Note: The performance sequences in My Love Came Back were accomplished by placing a professional female violinist behind the actress to perform the complicated left-hand fingering while the actress played the bow with her right hand.) Bosley Crowther of The New York Times described the film as "a featherlight frolic, a rollicking roundelay of deliciously pointed nonsense", finding that de Havilland "plays the part with pace and wit".

That same year, de Havilland was reunited with Flynn in their sixth film together, Michael Curtiz's Western adventure Santa Fe Trail, set against the backdrop of abolitionist John Brown's radical antislavery attacks in the days leading up to the American Civil War. The mostly fictional story follows West Point cadets J. E. B. Stuart and George Armstrong Custer, played by Flynn and Ronald Reagan, respectively, as they make their way west, both vying for the affections of Kit Carson Halliday. Playing Kit in a provocative, tongue-in-cheek manner, de Havilland creates a character of real substance and dimension, according to Tony Thomas. Following its world premiere on December 13, 1940, at the Lensic Theater in Santa Fe, New Mexico, which was attended by cast members, reporters, the governor, and over 60,000 fans, Santa Fe Trail became one of the top-grossing films of 1940. After accompanying Flynn on the well-publicized train ride to Santa Fe, de Havilland was unable to attend the premiere because she had been diagnosed with appendicitis that morning and rushed into surgery.

=== 1941–1944: War years and lawsuit ===
Following her emergency surgery, de Havilland began a long period of convalescence in a Los Angeles hospital during which time she rejected several scripts offered to her by Warner Bros., which led to another suspension. She appeared in three commercially successful films released in 1941, beginning with Raoul Walsh's romantic comedy The Strawberry Blonde with James Cagney. Set during the Gay Nineties, the story involves a man who marries an outspoken advocate for women's rights after a rival steals his glamorous "strawberry blonde" girlfriend, and he later discovers her to be a loving and understanding wife. The film was a critical and commercial success. In Mitch Leisen's romantic drama Hold Back the Dawn with Charles Boyer for Paramount Pictures, she transitioned to a different type of role‍—‌an ordinary, decent, small-town teacher whose life and sexuality are awakened by a sophisticated European gigolo, whose own life is positively affected by her love. Leisen's careful direction and guidance appealed to de Havilland, much more than the workman-like approach of her Warner Bros. directors. Bosley Crowther wrote in The New York Times that she "plays the school teacher as a woman with romantic fancies whose honesty and pride are her own‍—‌and the film's‍—‌chief support. Incidentally, she is excellent." For this performance, she garnered her second Academy Award nomination, this time for Best Actress.

De Havilland was reunited with Flynn for their eighth movie together, Walsh's epic They Died with Their Boots On. The film is loosely based on the courtship and marriage of George Armstrong Custer and Elizabeth "Libbie" Bacon. Flynn and de Havilland had fallen out the previous year, mainly over the roles she was being given, and she had intended not to work with him again. Flynn said, "She was sick to death of playing 'the girl' and badly wanted a few good roles to show herself and the world that she was a fine actress." After she learned from Warner that Flynn had come to his office saying he needed her in the film, de Havilland accepted. Screenwriter Lenore Coffee was brought in to add several romantic scenes and improve the overall dialogue, resulting in a film that includes some of their finest work together. Their final on-screen appearance is Custer's farewell to his wife. "Errol was quite sensitive", de Havilland later remembered, "I think he knew it would be the last time we worked together." Flynn's final line in that scene would hold special meaning for her: "Walking through life with you, ma'am, has been a very gracious thing." They Died with Their Boots On was released on November 21, 1941, and while some reviewers criticized the film's historical inaccuracies, most applauded the action sequences, cinematography and acting. Thomas M. Pryor of The New York Times found de Havilland "altogether captivating". The film went on to earn $2.55 million (equivalent to $55,817,000 in 2025) and was Warner Bros.' second-biggest money-maker of that year.

In 1942, de Havilland appeared with Henry Fonda in Elliott Nugent's romantic comedy The Male Animal, about an idealistic professor fighting for academic freedom, while trying to hold onto his job and his wife Ellen, portrayed by de Havilland. While the role was not particularly challenging, her delineation of an intelligent, good-natured woman trying to resolve the unsettling circumstances of her life played a major part in the film's success, according to Tony Thomas. The film was a critical and commercial success, and Bosley Crowther of The New York Times noted that de Havilland "concocts a delightfully pliant and saucy character as the wife". Around the same time, she appeared with Bette Davis in John Huston's drama In This Our Life (1942). Based on the Pulitzer Prize-winning novel of the same name by Ellen Glasgow, the story is about two sisters whose lives are destroyed by the anger and jealousy of one of them. Crowther gave the film a negative review, but praised de Havilland's "warm and easy performance". During production, de Havilland and Huston began a romantic relationship that lasted for three years.

I wanted to do complex roles, like Melanie for example, and Jack Warner saw me as an ingénue. I was really restless to portray more developed human beings. Jack never understood this, and ... he would give me roles that really had no character or quality in them. I knew I wouldn't even be effective.

— Olivia de Havilland

According to de Havilland, one of the few truly satisfying roles she played for Warner Bros. was the title character in Norman Krasna's romantic comedy Princess O'Rourke (1943), in which she starred alongside Robert Cummings. Filmed in July and August 1942, the story is about a European princess in New York City visiting her diplomat uncle, who is trying to find her an American husband. Intent on choosing her own match, she boards a plane heading west and ends up falling in love with an American pilot, who is unaware of her true identity. (Note: The plot and several story devices‍—‌including the princess waking up in the bed of an honorable bachelor‍—‌was resurrected a decade later in Roman Holiday with Audrey Hepburn.) Released on October 23, 1943, the film did well at the box office. Crowther called it "a film which is in the best tradition of American screen comedy" and found de Havilland's performance "charming".

After fulfilling her seven-year Warner Bros. contract in 1943, de Havilland was informed that the contract had been extended by six months to allow for the times that she had been suspended. The studios had adopted the position that California law allowed them to suspend contract players for rejecting a role, and the period of suspension could be added to the contract period. Most contract players accepted this, but a few tried to challenge the assumption, including Bette Davis, who mounted an unsuccessful lawsuit against Warner Bros. in the 1930s. On August 23, 1943, acting on the advice of her lawyer Martin Gang, de Havilland filed suit against Warner Bros. in Los Angeles County Superior Court, seeking declaratory judgment that she was no longer bound by her contract. She used the grounds that an existing section of the California Labor Code forbade an employer from enforcing a contract against an employee for longer than seven years from the date of their first performance. When the court found in favor of de Havilland in November 1943, Warner Bros. immediately appealed.

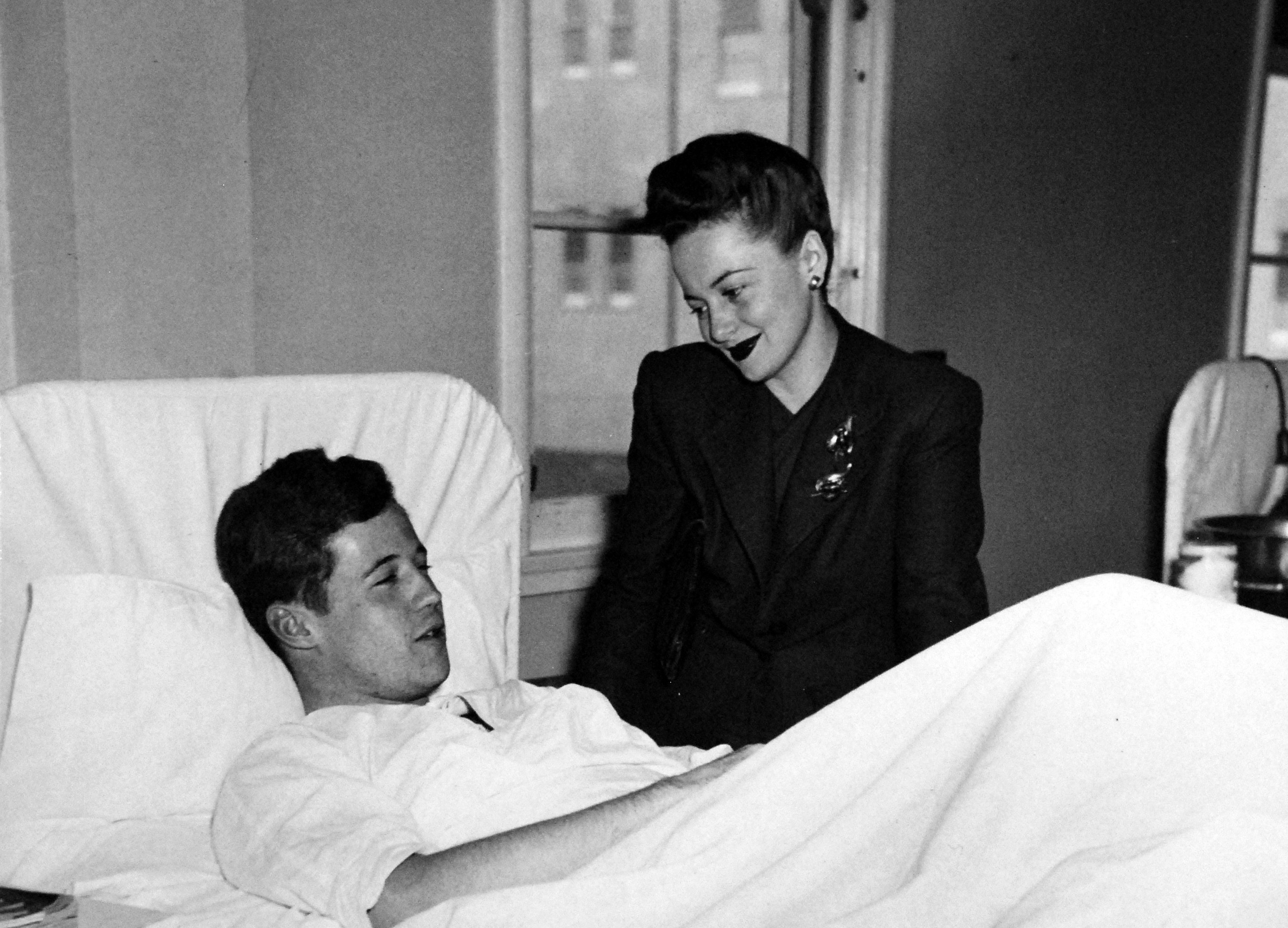
At the Naval Air Station in Kodiak, Alaska (March 20, 1944)

A little over a year later, the California Court of Appeal for the Second District ruled in de Havilland's favor. (Note: Two months later, the Supreme Court of California refused to review the case.) The decision was one of the most significant and far-reaching legal rulings in Hollywood, reducing the power of the studios and extending greater creative freedom to performers. California's resulting "seven-year rule", as articulated by the Court of Appeal in analysing Labor Code Section 2855 in this case, is still known as the De Havilland Law. Her legal victory, which cost her $13,000 (equivalent to $240,000 in 2025) in legal fees, won de Havilland the respect and admiration of her peers, among them her own sister Joan Fontaine, who later commented, "Hollywood owes Olivia a great deal." Among those who benefited most directly from the "de Havilland Decision" were filmmakers and actors who had served during World War II. If de Havilland had not won her legal battle against Warner Bros., months and years of military service could have been treated as one long suspension. Instead, actors including Clark Gable, Jimmy Stewart and Robert Taylor, were relieved of their contractual extensions. Warner Bros. reacted to the lawsuit by circulating a letter to other studios, which had the effect of a "virtual blacklisting". Consequently, de Havilland did not work at a film studio for almost two years.

She became a naturalized citizen of the United States on November 28, 1941, ten days before the U.S. entered World War II officially. During the war years, she actively contributed to the war effort. In May 1942, de Havilland joined the Hollywood Victory Caravan, a three-week train tour of the country that raised money through the sale of war bonds. Later that year, she began attending events at the Hollywood Canteen, meeting and dancing with troops. In December 1943, she joined a USO tour that travelled throughout the U.S. and the South Pacific, visiting wounded soldiers in military hospitals. She earned the respect and admiration of the troops for visiting the isolated islands and battlefronts in the Pacific. She survived flights in damaged aircraft and a bout with viral pneumonia that required several days' stay in one of the island barrack hospitals. (Note: In 1957, in appreciation of her support of the troops during World War II and the Korean War, de Havilland was made an honorary member of the 11th Airborne Division and was presented with a United States Army jacket bearing the 11th's patch on one sleeve and the name patch "de Havilland" across the chest.) She later remembered, "I loved doing the tours because it was a way I could serve my country and contribute to the war effort."

=== 1945–1952: Vindication and recognition ===
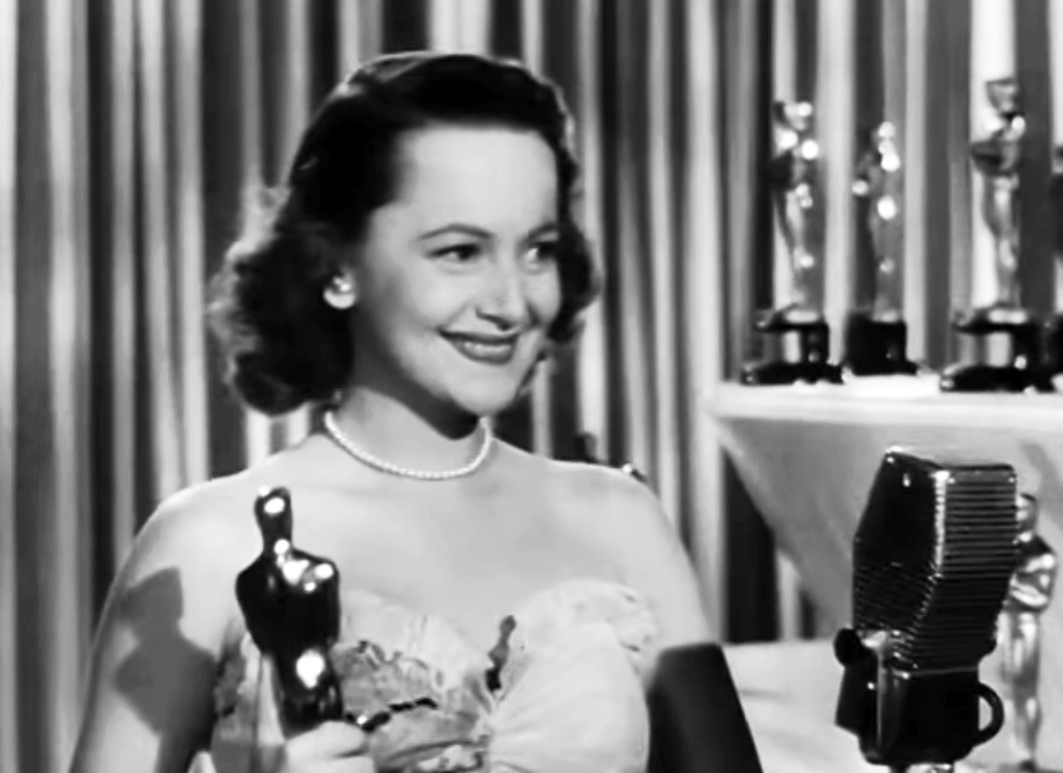
De Havilland with the first of her two Oscars, this one for To Each His Own, March 13, 1947

After the California Court of Appeal ruling freed her from her Warner Bros. contract, de Havilland signed a two-picture deal with Paramount Pictures. In June 1945, she began filming Mitchell Leisen's drama To Each His Own, (1946) about an unwed mother who gives up her child for adoption and then spends the rest of her life trying to undo that decision. De Havilland insisted on bringing in Leisen as director, trusting his eye for detail, his empathy for actors, and the way he controlled sentiment in their previous collaboration, Hold Back the Dawn. The role required de Havilland to age nearly 30 years over the course of the film‍—‌from an innocent, small-town girl to a shrewd, ruthless businesswoman devoted to her cosmetics company. While de Havilland never formally studied acting, she did read Stanislavsky's autobiography My Life in Art and applied one of his "methods" for this role. To help her define her character during the four periods of the story, she used a different perfume for each period. She also lowered the pitch of her voice incrementally in each period until it became a mature woman's voice. Her performance earned her the Academy Award for Best Actress for 1946‍—‌her first Oscar. According to film historian Tony Thomas, the award represented a vindication of her long struggle with Warner Bros. and confirmation of her abilities as an actress.

Her next two roles were challenging. In Robert Siodmak's psychological thriller The Dark Mirror (also 1946), de Havilland played twin sisters Ruth and Terry Collins‍—‌one loving and normal, the other psychotic. In addition to the technical problems of showing her as two characters interacting with each other on screen at the same time, de Havilland needed to portray two separate and psychologically opposite people. While the film was not well received by critics‍—‌Variety said the film "gets lost in a maze of psychological gadgets and speculation"‍—‌de Havilland's performance was praised by Tony Thomas, who called her final scene in the film "an almost frighteningly convincing piece of acting". In his review in The Nation, James Agee wrote that "her playing is thoughtful, quiet, detailed, and well sustained, and since it is founded, as some more talented playing is not, in an unusually healthful-seeming and likable temperament, it is an undivided pleasure to see". Later that year while appearing in a summer stock production of What Every Woman Knows in Westport, Connecticut, her second professional stage appearance, de Havilland began dating Marcus Goodrich, a U.S. Navy veteran, journalist and author of the novel Delilah (1941). The couple married on August 26, 1946.

De Havilland was praised for her performance as Virginia Cunningham in Anatole Litvak's drama The Snake Pit (1948), one of the first films to attempt a realistic portrayal of mental illness and an important exposé of the harsh conditions in state mental hospitals, according to film critic Philip French. Based on a novel by Mary Jane Ward and produced by Darryl F. Zanuck, the film is about a woman placed in a mental institution by her husband to help her recover from a nervous breakdown. Virginia Cunningham was one of the most difficult of all her film roles, requiring significant preparation both mentally and physically‍—‌she deliberately lost weight to help create her gaunt appearance on screen. She consulted regularly with psychiatrists hired as consultants for the film, and visited Camarillo State Mental Hospital to research her role and observe the patients. The extreme physical discomfort of the hydrotherapy and simulated electric shock therapy scenes were especially challenging for the slight 5-foot-3-inch (160 cm) actress. In her performance, she conveyed her mental anguish by physically transforming her face with furrowed brow, wild, staring eyes and grimacing mouth.

I met a young woman who was very much like Virginia, about the same age and physical description, as well as being a schizophrenic with guilt problems. ... What struck me most of all was the fact that she was rather likable and appealing. It hadn't occurred to me before that a mental patient could be appealing, and it was that that gave me the key to the performance.

— Olivia de Havilland

According to author Judith Kass, de Havilland delivered a performance both "restrained and electric", portraying varied and extreme aspects of her character‍—‌from a shy young woman to a tormented and disorientated woman. For her performance in The Snake Pit, de Havilland received an Academy Award nomination for Best Actress, the New York Film Critics Circle Award for Best Actress, and the Venice Film Festival Volpi Cup.

De Havilland appeared in William Wyler's period drama The Heiress (1949), the fourth in a string of critically acclaimed performances. After seeing the play on Broadway, de Havilland called Wyler and urged him to fly to New York to see what she felt would be a perfect role for her. Wyler obliged, loved the play, and with de Havilland's help arranged for Paramount to secure the film rights. Adapted for the screen by Ruth and Augustus Goetz and based on the 1880 novel Washington Square by Henry James, the film is about a dull, guileless young woman who falls in love with a handsome, disingenuous young man (Montgomery Clift), over the objections of her cruel and emotionally abusive father, who suspects the young man of being a fortune seeker. As she had done in Hold Back the Dawn, de Havilland portrayed her character's transformation from a shy, trusting innocent to a guarded, mature woman over a period of years. Her delineation of Catherine Sloper is developed through carefully crafted movements, gestures and facial expressions that convey a submissive and inhibited young woman. Her timid voice, nervous hands, downcast eyes and careful movements all communicate what the character is too shy to verbalize. Throughout the production, Wyler pressed de Havilland hard to elicit the requisite visual points of the character. When Catherine returns home after being jilted, the director had the actress carry a suitcase filled with heavy books up the stairs to convey the weight of Catherine's trauma physically instead of using a planned speech in the original script. The Heiress was released in October 1949 and was well received by critics. For her performance, she received the New York Film Critics Award, the Golden Globe Award, and the Academy Award for Best Actress, ‍—‌her second Oscar.

After giving birth to her first child, Benjamin, on September 27, 1949, de Havilland took time off from making films to be with her infant son. She turned down the role of Blanche DuBois in A Streetcar Named Desire, later explaining that becoming a mother was a "transforming experience" and that she could not relate to the character.

=== 1946–1953: Return to the theater ===
After being freed from her contractual obligation to Warner Bros. and completing The Dark Mirror, in the summer of 1946, de Havilland returned to the stage in the role of Maggie in James M. Barrie's What Every Woman Knows for a week-long run in Connecticut's Westport Country Playhouse. Her friend, Irene Mayer Selznick, who worked for the Playhouse, had suggested de Havilland for the role. Directed by Phyliss Loughton, dramatic coach and de Havilland's dialogue director for The Dark Mirror, the production sold out weeks in advance, offering standing room only for the week-long performance. In early August, de Havilland was reintroduced to novelist Marcus Goodrich. Three weeks later, on August 26, 1946, they were married the same day she opened in What Every Woman Knows. The wedding took place at the home of Lawrence Langer, one of the founders of New York's Theatre Guild, and his wife Armina Marshall. Together, they owned and operated the Westport Country Playhouse. Irene Selznick was a guest at the wedding.

After completing The Snake Pit and The Heiress, de Havilland decided to return to the stage in a production of Romeo and Juliet. In 1934, when she toured in Max Reinhardt's production of A Midsummer Night's Dream, Reinhardt suggested that de Havilland one day play Juliet and she promised to do so. Additionally, de Havilland had admired Katharine Cornell's Juliet, which she saw when the actress's repertory company played San Francisco in January 1934. In 2012, de Havilland recalled, "Cornell's touring with these plays seemed so glamourous to me that I dreamed of one day doing the same." Following a week of rehearsals in Detroit, the production opened on January 22, 1951, running two weeks at Detroit's Cass Theatre. The production then moved to Cleveland's Hanna Theatre, then on to Boston's Schubert Theatre, where it opened on February 13 and played for three weeks. After 48 performances on the road, on Saturday, March 10, de Havilland's Romeo and Juliet reached Broadway, opening at The Broadhurst Theatre. Reviews were mixed. The production was lavish and de Havilland's salary high, making it both a critical failure and a financial loss. The play closed on April 21, 1951, with a total of 45 performances in New York.

Undiscouraged, De Havilland immediately followed this production with the title role in a summer stock company of George Bernard Shaw's Victorian comedy Candida. As with Romeo and Juliet, de Havilland was inspired by Cornell's 1935 production of Candida. An ensemble play, a strong supporting cast was essential and de Havilland controlled the final casting, which provided a successful blend of talent. De Havilland's Candida opened on June 11, 1951, at the Westport Country Playhouse, which was celebrating its 20th anniversary season. Over ten weeks, de Havilland played ten community theatres to sold out houses. Though some reviewers thought the play itself had become quaint, the provincial critics found de Havilland's performance "enchanting" and the supporting cast "perfectly splendid." In July 1951, de Havilland told a reporter, "Let's face it cliché and all,… I love the theater. I'm not unhappy working in Hollywood. How could I be? It's just that I'm happier in the livelier drama rushing from one summer theater to another and living in something less than the lap of luxury, well, these are part of this thing I love."

A key to de Havilland's interpretation of Candida was her youth. In 1951, de Havilland was 35 and her co-star Ron Randall was not quite 40. Candida and her husband, Rev. James Morell, de Havilland explained, were frequently played by middle-aged actors. "People understand properly that Marchbanks is rather a callow teenager, but they have an idea that Candida and Morell are in their forties and fifties, respectively. Shaw's script, of course, is quite specific in the matter of age. Candida is 33 and Morell is an attractive, virile man only a few years older." She added, "[M]ost people have forgotten ... When Katharine Cornell first played Candida, she was only 26 years old." Originally, de Havilland's Candida was booked for only the summer months, and as of late July, de Havilland still considered taking her Romeo and Juliet on a national tour, though simpler sets and streamlined production would have to be designed. By August, she had changed her mind, and a national tour of Candida was planned. Largely recast, it was directed by Norris Houghton (who suggested de Havilland play the role), and produced by Thomas Hammond. On the national tour, de Havilland performed for audiences and critics in major cities like San Francisco, Cleveland and Chicago.

Candida opened in St. Louis on October 8, 1951. The company ultimately toured for 25 weeks, traveling over 10,000 miles and playing 43 cities, nearly all to capacity houses. De Havilland told columnist Sheilah Graham, "I did two tours with the play, and broke seven house records ... You know Katharine Cornell did Candida five times, but I chalked up 332 performances against her 316." In November 1951, de Havilland played a three-week run at San Francisco's Geary Theatre, where she had seen Cornell as Candida. Critic Luther Nichols found the company "a smooth and competent professional ensemble." Critic Wood Soanes, however, found the production lacking in every regard, warning, "Candida has been a huge money-maker on the road, so I am informed, thanks to the draw of Miss de Havilland's name. It is headed for New York but unless something happens to improve it, Miss de Havilland is likely to have a worse time of it in Manhattan than she did with Romeo and Juliet."

Many of the national reviews were glowing. The Tulsa Daily World noted, "Olivia de Havilland casts upon the famous, many-sided heroine a vivid fresh light, endows her with a new grace, a new appeal to tears and laughter. Critics have hailed her Candida interpretation, blessed, as it is, with a delightful sense of humor, as an artistic triumph, long to be cherished and remembered." Chicago's reception in January 1952, however, was generally negative and, when the tour concluded in New York City for a four-week limited engagement at the National Theatre, several important critics found the production lackluster. The show closed on May 18, 1952. The same day, de Havilland announced her plan to file for divorce from Marcus Goodrich. Her marriage to Goodrich had grown strained largely due to his unstable temperament. The divorce became final the following year.

De Havilland considered a return to the stage in Henry James's Portrait of a Lady, to be produced again by Thomas Hammond. It was to open in mid-September 1952, in St. Louis. Instead, however, she accepted the leading role in My Cousin Rachel. In the summer of 1953, de Havilland starred in The Dazzling Hour, a French farce (L'Heure Eblouissante by Anna Bonacci) directed by José Ferrer and co-produced by Gilbert Miller. The play was mounted by the La Jolla Playhouse and was scheduled to open on Broadway in mid-October. The adaptation written by Ferrer and Ketti Frings was criticized as "dull and erratic", and the company did not continue to New York.

De Havilland did not return to the New York stage until 1962 in A Gift of Time. Her co-star was Henry Fonda, and the play ran at the Ethel Barrymore Theatre from February 22 through May 12, 1962. De Havilland's television debut came on April 8, 1951, on Showtime, U. S. A. when she acted in a scene from Romeo and Juliet.

=== 1953–1962: New life in Paris ===
Of course the thing that staggers you when you first come to France is the fact that all the French speak French‍—‌even the children. Many Americans and Britishers who visit the country never quite adjust to this, and the idea persists that the natives speak the language just to show off or be difficult.

— Olivia de Havilland in Every Frenchman Has One

In April 1953, at the invitation of the French government, she travelled to the Cannes Film Festival, where she met Pierre Galante, an executive editor for the French journal Paris Match. Following a long-distance courtship and the requisite nine-month residency requirement, de Havilland and Galante married on April 12, 1955, in the village of Yvoy-le-Marron, and settled together in a three-storey house near the Bois de Boulogne park in Paris' 16th Arrondissement. That same year, she returned to the screen in Terence Young's period drama That Lady (1955), about a Spanish princess and her unrequited love for King Philip II of Spain, whose respect she earned in her youth after losing an eye in a sword fight defending his honor. According to Tony Thomas, the film uses authentic Spanish locations effectively, but suffers from a convoluted plot and excessive dialogue, and while de Havilland delivered a warm and elegant performance as Ana de Mendoza, the film was disappointing. Following her appearances in the romantic melodrama Not as a Stranger (1955) and The Ambassador's Daughter (1956)‍—‌neither of which was successful at the box office—de Havilland gave birth to her second child, Gisèle Galante, on July 18, 1956.

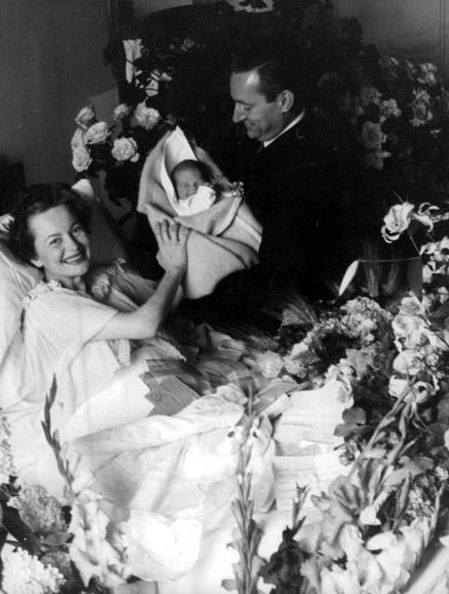
With Pierre Galante and daughter Gisèle, 1956

De Havilland returned to the screen in Michael Curtiz's Western drama The Proud Rebel (1958), a film about a former Confederate soldier (Alan Ladd) whose wife was killed in the war and whose son lost the ability to speak after witnessing the tragedy. De Havilland played Linnett Moore, a tough yet feminine frontier woman who cares for the boy and comes to love his father. The movie was filmed on location in Utah, where de Havilland learned to hitch and drive a team of horses and handle a gun for her role. The Proud Rebel was released May 28, 1958, and was well received by audiences and critics. In his review for The New York Times, A. H. Weiler called the film a "truly sensitive effort" and "heartwarming drama", and praised de Havilland's ability to convey the "warmth, affection and sturdiness needed in the role".

One of de Havilland's best received performances during this period was in Guy Green's romantic drama Light in the Piazza (1962) with Rossano Brazzi. Filmed in Florence and Rome, and based on Elizabeth Spencer's novel of the same name, the film is about a middle-class American tourist on extended vacation in Italy with her beautiful 26-year-old daughter (Yvette Mimieux), who is mentally disabled as a result of a childhood accident. Faced with the prospect of her daughter falling in love with a young Italian, the mother struggles with conflicting emotions about her daughter's future. De Havilland projects a calm maternal serenity throughout most of the film, only showing glimpses of the worried mother anxious for her child's happiness. The film was released on February 19, 1962, and was well received, with a Hollywood Reporter reviewer calling it "an uncommon love story ... told with rare delicacy and force", and Variety noting that the film "achieves the rare and delicate balance of artistic beauty, romantic substance, dramatic novelty and commercial appeal". Variety singled out de Havilland's performance as "one of great consistency and subtle projection".

In early 1962, de Havilland traveled to New York City, and began rehearsals for Garson Kanin's stage play A Gift of Time. Adapted from the autobiographical book Death of a Man by Lael Tucker Wertenbaker, the play explores the emotionally painful struggle of a housewife forced to deal with the slow death of her husband, played by Henry Fonda. The play opened at the Ethel Barrymore Theater on Broadway to positive notices, with de Havilland receiving her best reviews as a stage actress. Theater critic Walter Kerr praised her final scene, writing, "As darkness gathers, the actress gains in stature, taking on the simple and resolute willingness to understand." The New York World-Telegram and Sun reviewer concluded: "It is Miss de Havilland who gives the play its unbroken continuity. This distinguished actress reveals Lael as a special and admirable woman." She stayed with the production for 90 performances. The year 1962 also saw the publication of de Havilland's first book, Every Frenchman Has One, a lighthearted account of her often amusing attempts to understand and adapt to French life, manners and customs. The book sold out its first printing prior to the publication date and went on to become a bestseller.

=== 1963–1988: Later films and television ===
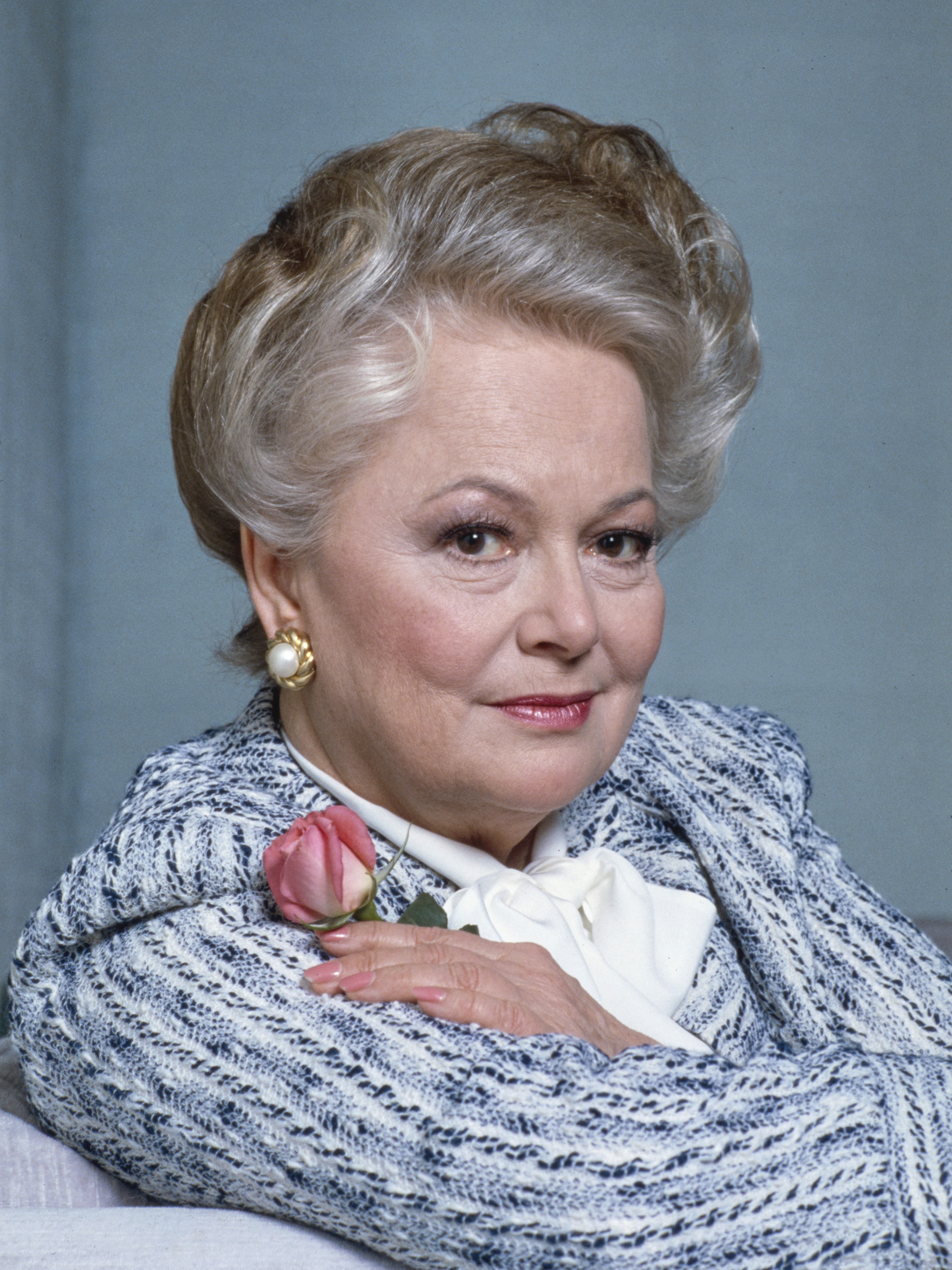
de Havilland in 1985

De Havilland appeared in her final motion picture leading roles in two films released in 1964, both of which were psychological thrillers. In Walter Grauman's Lady in a Cage, she played a wealthy poet who becomes trapped in her mansion's elevator and faces the threat of three terrorising hooligans in her own home. Critics responded negatively to the graphic violence and cruelty shown on screen. A. H. Weiler of The New York Times called it a "sordid, if suspenseful, exercise in aimless brutality". That same year, de Havilland appeared in Robert Aldrich's Hush...Hush, Sweet Charlotte with her close friend Bette Davis. After Joan Crawford left the picture owing to illness, Davis had Aldrich fly to Switzerland to persuade a reluctant de Havilland to accept the role of Miriam Deering, a cruel, conniving character hidden behind the charming façade of a polite and cultured lady. Her quiet, restrained performance provided a counterbalance to Davis. Film historian Tony Thomas described her performance as "a subtle piece of acting" that was "a vital contribution to the effectiveness of the film". The film was mainly well received and earned seven Academy Award nominations. In 1965 she served as the president of the jury of the 18th Cannes Film Festival, the first woman to do so.

As film roles became more difficult to find, a common problem shared by many Hollywood veterans from her era, de Havilland began working in television dramas, despite her dislike of the networks' practice of breaking up story lines with commercials. Her first venture into the medium was a teleplay directed by Sam Peckinpah called Noon Wine (1966) on ABC Stage 67, a dark tragedy about a farmer's act of murder that leads to his suicide. The production and her performance as the farmer's wife Ellie were well received. In 1972, she starred in her first television film, The Screaming Woman, about a wealthy woman recovering from a nervous breakdown. In 1979, she appeared in the ABC miniseries Roots: The Next Generations in the role of Mrs. Warner, the wife of a former Confederate officer played by Henry Fonda. The miniseries was seen by an estimated 110 million people‍—‌nearly one-third of American homes with television sets. Throughout the 1970s, de Havilland's film work was limited to smaller supporting roles and cameo appearances. Her last feature film was The Fifth Musketeer (1979).

From 1971 to 1980, de Havilland toured the United States with her autobiographical presentation "From the City of Stars to the City of Light," recounting her career in Hollywood and her subsequent life in France. The first year, she completed a successful seven-city tour, including Detroit, Dallas, Wichita and Richmond, Virginia, and immediately booked twelve more cities. She spoke mostly to women, addressing Junior League Town Halls and various women's associations, raising funds for local charities from mental health clinics to restorations of theaters. From February 9–15, 1979, she cruised on the Mississippi Queen, sharing her reminiscences with the river boat's passengers.

During these tours, de Havilland reconnected with the United States and her American audience, past and present. Having lived in France for nearly twenty years, she considered moving back to the East Coast, particularly Washington, D.C. Ultimately, she never left her home in Paris.

Additionally, during the late 1970s, de Havilland visited numerous US cities, raising funds for "Venture", a $100 million program to expand missions of the Episcopal Church. She also appeared at several tributes to Gone With the Wind, notably the lavish 40th anniversary celebration led by film historian Ron Haver at the Los Angeles County Museum of Art in 1979.

In the 1980s, her television work included an Agatha Christie television film Murder Is Easy (1982), the television drama The Royal Romance of Charles and Diana (1982) in which she played the Queen Mother, and the 1986 ABC miniseries North and South, Book II. Her performance in the television film Anastasia: The Mystery of Anna (1986), as Dowager Empress Maria, earned her a Golden Globe Award for Best Supporting Actress in a Series, Miniseries or Television Film. In 1988, de Havilland appeared in the HTV romantic television drama The Woman He Loved; it was her final screen performance.

=== 1989–2020: Retirement and honors ===
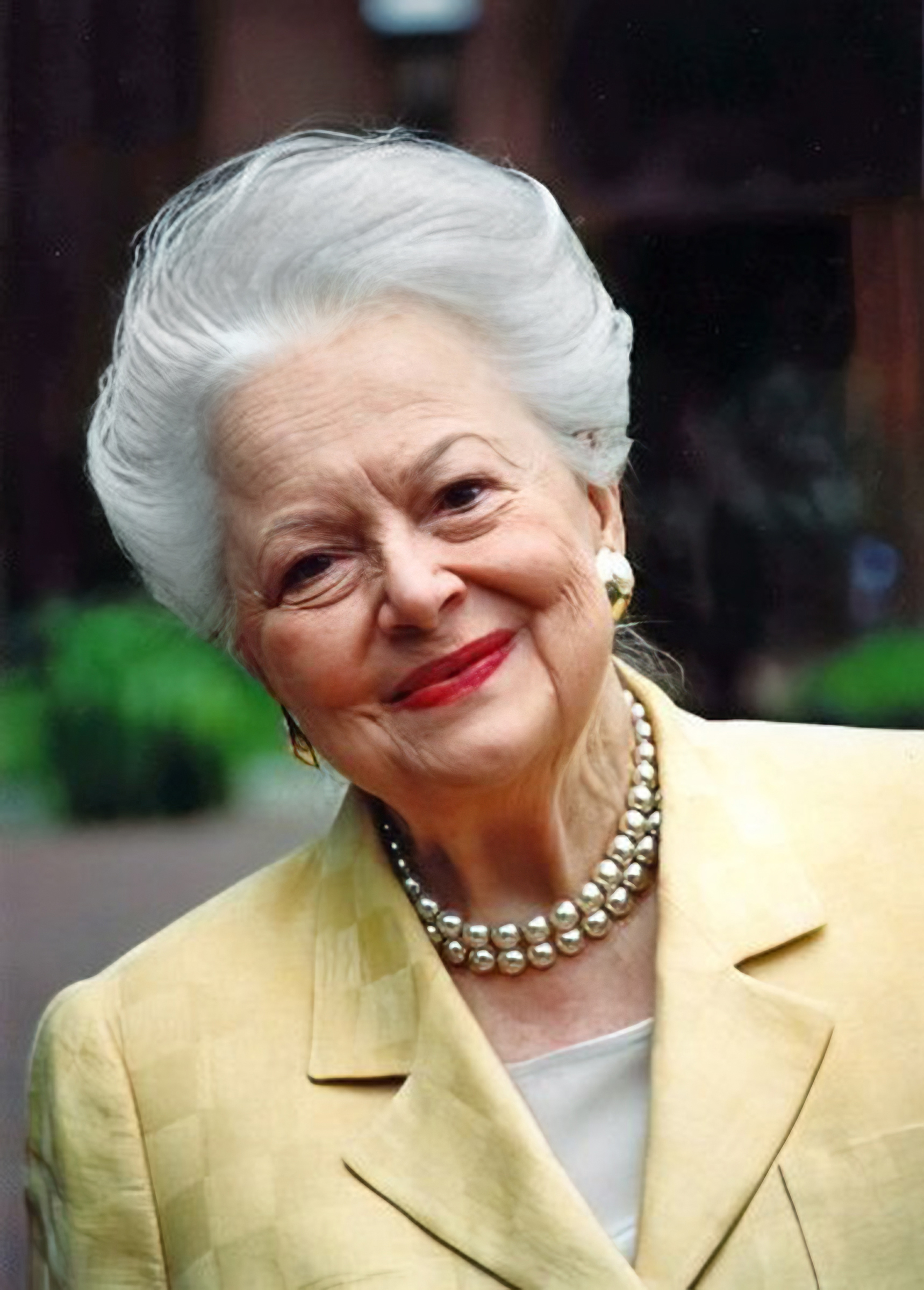
de Havilland at the Smithsonian Institution in 2001

In retirement, de Havilland remained active in the film community. In 1998, she travelled to New York City to help promote a special showing of Gone with the Wind. In 2003, she appeared as a presenter at the 75th Academy Awards, earning an extended standing ovation upon her entrance. In 2004, Turner Classic Movies produced a retrospective piece called Melanie Remembers in which she was interviewed for the 65th anniversary of the original release of Gone with the Wind. In June 2006, she made appearances at tributes commemorating her 90th birthday at the Academy of Motion Picture Arts and Sciences and the Los Angeles County Museum of Art.

On November 17, 2008, at the age of 92, de Havilland received the National Medal of Arts, the highest honor conferred to an individual artist on behalf of the people of the United States. The medal was presented to her by President George W. Bush, who commended her "for her persuasive and compelling skill as an actress in roles from Shakespeare's Hermia to Margaret Mitchell's Melanie. Her independence, integrity and grace won creative freedom for herself and her fellow film actors." The following year, de Havilland narrated the documentary I Remember Better When I Paint (2009), a film about the importance of art in the treatment of Alzheimer's disease.

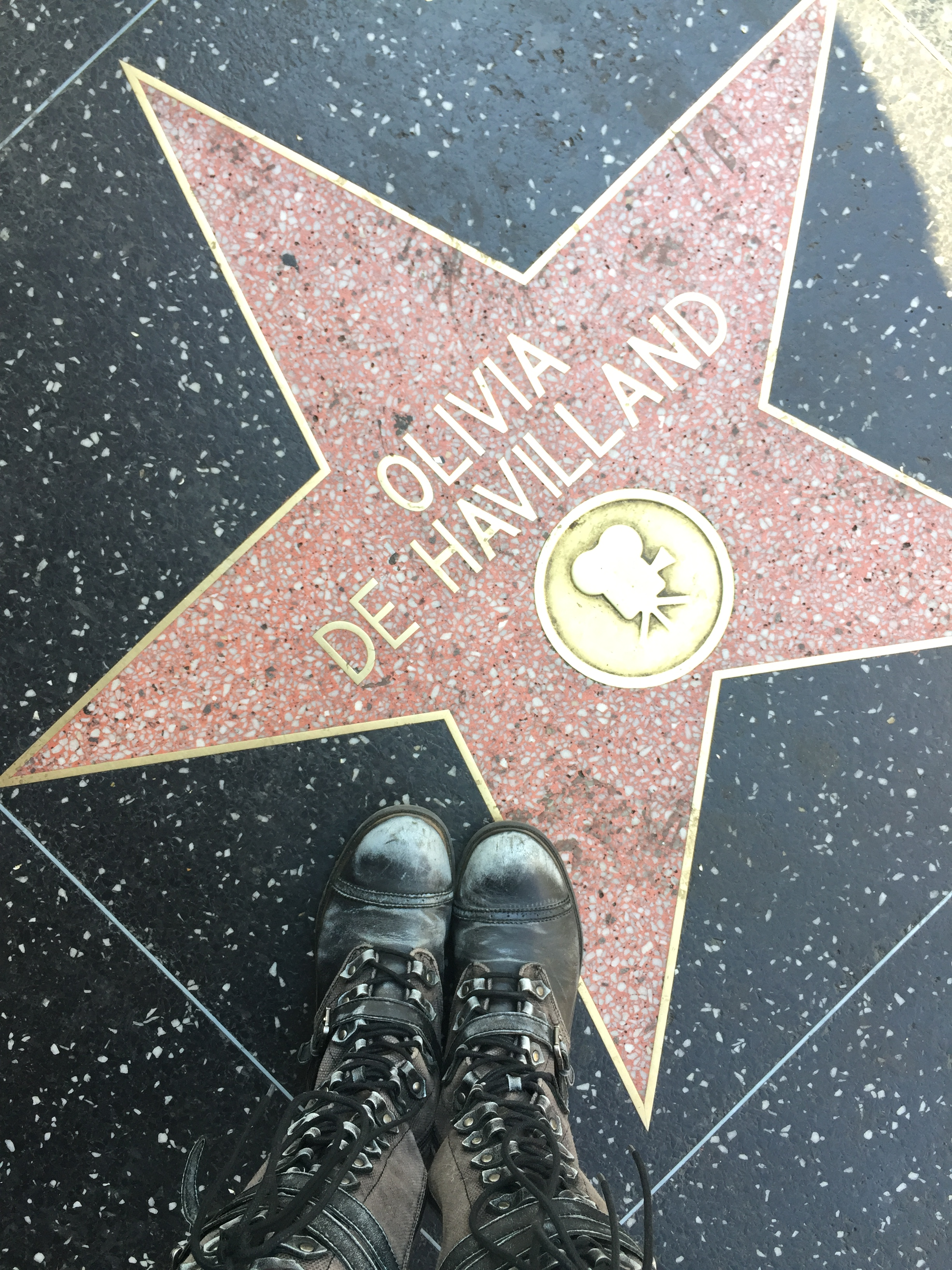
Olivia de Havilland's star on the Hollywood Walk of Fame.

In 2010, de Havilland almost made her return to the big screen after a 22-year hiatus with James Ivory's planned adaptation of The Aspern Papers, but the film was never made. On September 9, 2010, de Havilland was appointed a Chevalier (knight) of the Légion d'honneur, the highest decoration in France, awarded by President Nicolas Sarkozy, who told the actress, "You honor France for having chosen us." In February the following year, she appeared at the César Awards in France, where she was greeted with a standing ovation. (Note: In February 2016, de Havilland was named "Oldie of the Year" by the satirical magazine The Oldie. Unable to travel to the ceremony in London, she recorded a message saying she was "utterly delighted" the judges deemed "sufficient snap in my celery" existed to win the accolade.) De Havilland celebrated her 100th birthday on July 1, 2016.

In June 2017, two weeks before her 101st birthday, de Havilland was appointed Dame Commander of the Order of the British Empire in the 2017 Birthday Honours for services to drama by Queen Elizabeth II. She is the oldest woman ever to receive the honor. In a statement, she called it "the most gratifying of birthday presents". She did not travel to the investiture ceremony at Buckingham Palace and received her honor from the hands of the British Ambassador to France at her Paris apartment in March 2018, four months before her 102nd birthday. Her daughter Gisèle was by her side.

== Personal life ==
=== Relationships ===
Although known as one of Hollywood's most exciting on-screen couples, de Havilland and Errol Flynn were never involved in a romantic relationship. Upon first meeting her at Warner Bros. in August 1935, 26-year-old Flynn was drawn to the 19-year-old actress with "warm brown eyes" and "extraordinary charm". In turn, de Havilland fell in love with him, (Note: In 2009, de Havilland said, "Yes, we did fall in love and I believe that this is evident in the screen chemistry between us. But his circumstances at the time prevented the relationship going further. I have not talked about it a great deal, but the relationship was not consummated. Chemistry was there, though. It was there.") but kept her feelings to herself. Flynn later wrote, "By the time we made The Charge of the Light Brigade, I was sure that I was in love with her." Flynn finally professed his love on March 12, 1937, at the coronation ball for King George VI at the Ambassador Hotel in Los Angeles, where they slow danced together to "Sweet Leilani" at the hotel's Coconut Grove nightclub. "I was deeply affected by him," she later remembered, "It was impossible for me not to be." The evening ended on a sobering note, with de Havilland insisting that despite his separation from his wife Lili Damita, he needed to divorce her before their relationship could proceed. Flynn reunited with his wife later that year, and de Havilland never acted on her feelings for Flynn. (Note: During the making of Robin Hood in November 1937, de Havilland decided to tease Flynn who was being watched closely on the set by his wife. In 2005, de Havilland said, "And so we had one kissing scene, which I looked forward to with great delight. I remember I blew every take, at least six in a row, maybe seven, maybe eight, and we had to kiss all over again. And Errol Flynn got really rather uncomfortable, and he had, if I may say so, a little trouble with his tights.")

In July 1938, de Havilland began dating business tycoon, aviator and filmmaker Howard Hughes, who had just completed his record-setting flight around the world in 91 hours. In addition to escorting her about town, he gave the actress her first flying lessons. She later said, "He was a rather shy man ... and yet, in a whole community where the men every day played heroes on the screen and didn't do anything heroic in life, here was this man who was a real hero."

In December 1939, she began a romantic relationship with actor James Stewart. At the request of Irene Mayer Selznick, the actor's agent asked Stewart to escort de Havilland to the New York premiere of Gone with the Wind at the Astor Theater on December 19, 1939. Over the next few days, Stewart took her to the theater several times and to the 21 Club. They continued to see each other back in Los Angeles, where Stewart provided occasional flying lessons and romance. According to de Havilland, Stewart proposed marriage to her in 1940, but she felt that he was not ready to settle down. Their relationship ended in late 1941 when de Havilland began a romantic relationship with film director John Huston while making In This Our Life. "John was a very great love of mine", she later said, "He was a man I wanted to marry." (Note: On April 29, 1945, at the home of producer David O. Selznick, Huston, who knew about de Havilland's three-year crush on Flynn, confronted the Australian actor‍—‌who suffered from tuberculosis‍—‌about his not serving in the military during the war. When Flynn responded by alluding to his former "relationship" with de Havilland, Huston initiated an extended fistfight with the expert amateur boxer which landed them both in the hospital.)

=== Marriages and children ===
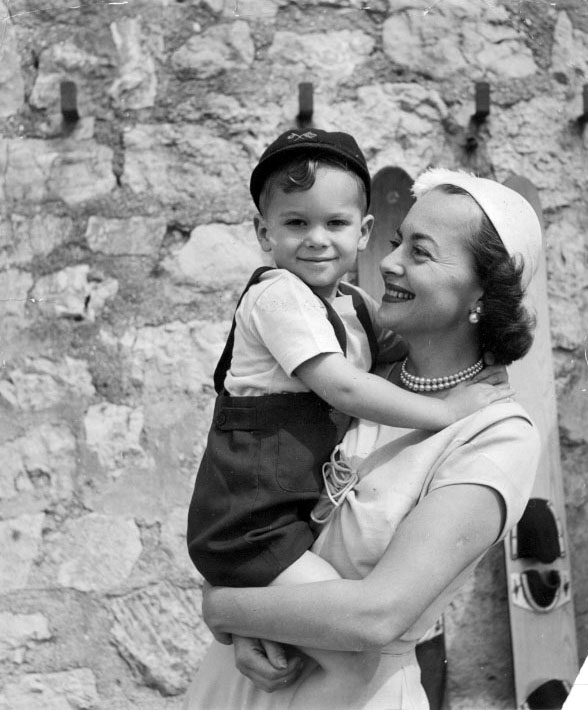
With her son, Benjamin, c. 1952

On August 26, 1946, she married Marcus Goodrich, a U.S. Navy veteran, journalist and author of the novel Delilah (1941). De Havilland filed for divorce in 1952, writing in her suit that Goodrich had "pursued a course of cruel treatment" and had "wrongfully inflicted upon her grievous physical and mental suffering, all without provocation or any excuse whatsoever." They had one child, Benjamin Goodrich, who was born on September 27, 1949.

Benjamin was diagnosed with Hodgkin's lymphoma at the age of 19 and graduated from the University of Texas. He worked as a statistical analyst for Lockheed Missiles and Space Company in Sunnyvale, California, and as an international banking representative for the Texas Commerce Bank in Houston. He died on September 29, 1991, in Paris at the age of 42 of heart disease brought on by treatments for Hodgkin's disease, three weeks before the death of his father.

On April 2, 1955, de Havilland married Pierre Galante, an executive editor for the magazine Paris Match. Her marriage to Galante prompted her relocation to Paris. The couple separated in 1962 for undisclosed reasons but continued to live in the same house for another six years to raise their daughter together. Galante moved across the street and the two remained close, even after the divorce was finalized in 1979.

She looked after him during his final bout with lung cancer prior to his death in 1998. They had one child, Gisèle Galante, who was born on July 18, 1956. After studying law at the Paris Nanterre University School of Law, Gisèle worked as a journalist in France and the United States. From 1956, de Havilland lived in a three-storey house near the Bois de Boulogne in Paris.

=== Religion and politics ===
De Havilland was raised in the Episcopal Church and remained an Episcopalian throughout her life. (Note: In a 2015 interview, de Havilland stated that her religious beliefs had lapsed in her adult years, but that she regained her faith when her son was ill. Her renewed faith inspired her sister to return to the Episcopal Church.) In the 1970s, she became one of the first women lectors at the American Cathedral in Paris, where she was on the regular rota for Scripture readings. As recently as 2012, she was doing readings on major feast days, including Christmas and Easter. "It's a task I love", she once said. In describing her preparation for her readings, she once observed, "You have to convey the deep meaning, you see, and it has to start with your own faith. But first, I always pray. I pray before I start to prepare, as well. In fact, I would always say a prayer before shooting a scene, so this is not so different, in a way." De Havilland preferred to use the Revised English Bible for its poetic style. She raised her son Benjamin in the Episcopal Church and her daughter Gisèle in the Roman Catholic Church, the faith of each child's father.

As a United States citizen, de Havilland became involved in politics as a way of exercising her civic responsibilities. She campaigned for Democratic President Franklin D. Roosevelt's ultimately successful reelection bid in 1944. After the war, she joined the Independent Citizens Committee of the Arts, Sciences and Professions, a national public-policy advocacy group that included Bette Davis, Gregory Peck, Groucho Marx and Humphrey Bogart in its Hollywood chapter.

In June 1946, she was asked to deliver speeches for the committee that, in her view, reflected the Communist Party line. The group was later alleged to be a communist front organization. De Havilland removed from her speeches the material that she considered pro-communist and rewrote them to reflect Democratic president Harry S. Truman's anti-communist platform. She later recalled, "I realized a nucleus of people was controlling the organization without a majority of the members of the board being aware of it. And I knew they had to be Communists."

She organized a fight to regain control of the committee from its pro-Soviet leadership, but her reform efforts failed. Her resignation from the committee triggered a wave of resignations by 11 other Hollywood figures, including future president Ronald Reagan. (Note: Reagan was a relatively new board member when he was invited to join 10 other film-industry colleagues, including MGM studio head Dore Schary, for a meeting at de Havilland's house where he was first told that Communists were trying to gain control of the committee. During the meeting, he turned to de Havilland, who was on the executive committee, and whispered, "You know, Olivia, I always thought you might be one of them." Laughing, she responded, "That's funny. I thought you were one of them." Reagan suggested they propose a resolution at the next meeting that included language reaffirmed the committee's "belief in free enterprise and the Democratic system" and repudiated "Communism as desirable for the United States"‍—‌the executive committee voted it down the following week. Shortly afterwards, the committee disbanded and merged with the National Citizens PAC to form the Progressive Citizens of America (PCA). Despite organising Hollywood resistance to Soviet influence, de Havilland was denounced later that year as a "swimming-pool pink" in Time magazine for her involvement in the committee.) In 1958, she was secretly called before the House Un-American Activities Committee and recounted her experiences with the Independent Citizens' Committee.

=== Relationship with Joan Fontaine ===
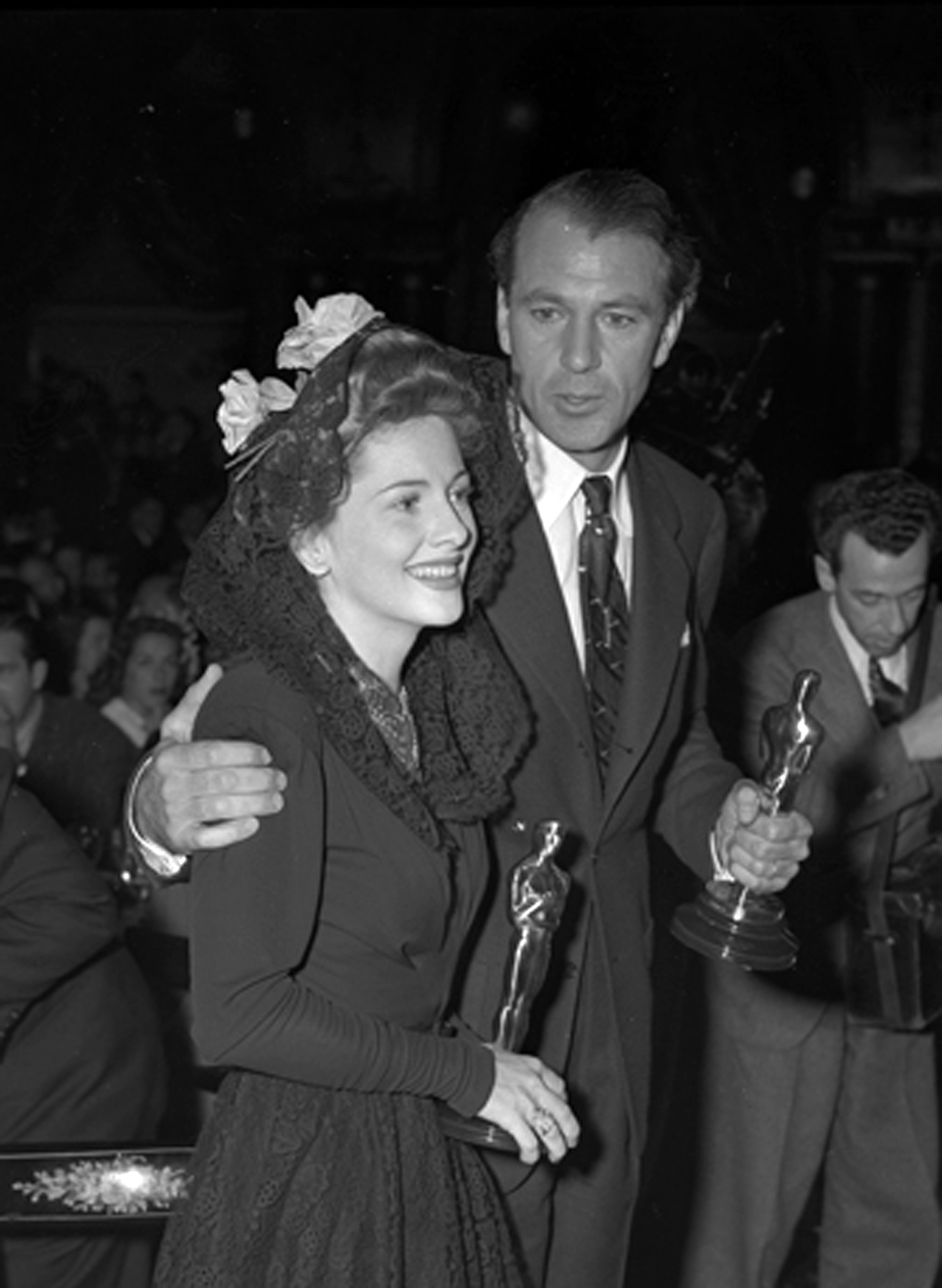
Joan Fontaine and Gary Cooper at the Academy Awards, 1942

De Havilland and her sister Joan Fontaine are the only siblings to have each won Academy Awards in a lead acting category. According to biographer Charles Higham, the sisters always had an uneasy relationship, starting in early childhood when Olivia had trouble accepting the idea of having a younger sister and Joan resented that her mother favored Olivia. Olivia would tear the clothes that her sister was given to wear as hand-me-downs, forcing Joan to stitch them together again. This tension was made worse by Fontaine's frequent childhood illnesses, which led to her mother's overly protective expression "Livvie can, Joan can't." De Havilland was the first to become an actress, and for several years Fontaine was overshadowed by her sister's accomplishments. When Mervyn LeRoy offered Fontaine a personal contract, her mother told her that Warner Bros. was "Olivia's studio" and that she could not use the family name of de Havilland.

In 1942, de Havilland and Fontaine were both nominated for an Academy Award for Best Actress‍—‌de Havilland for Hold Back the Dawn and Fontaine for Suspicion. When Fontaine's name was announced as winner, de Havilland reacted graciously saying "We've got it!" According to biographer Charles Higham, Fontaine rejected de Havilland's attempts to congratulate her, leaving de Havilland offended and embarrassed.

Their relationship was strained further in 1946 when Fontaine made negative comments to an interviewer about de Havilland's new husband Marcus Goodrich. When she read her sister's remarks, de Havilland was deeply hurt and waited for an apology that was never offered. The following year after accepting her first Academy Award for To Each His Own, de Havilland was approached backstage by Fontaine, who extended her hand to congratulate her; de Havilland turned away from her sister. The two did not speak for the next five years. (Note: In 1957, in the only interview in which she ever commented on her relationship with her sister, de Havilland told the Associated Press "Joan is very bright and sharp and has a wit that can be cutting. She said some things about Marcus that hurt me deeply. She was aware there was an estrangement between us.") This may have caused an estrangement between Fontaine and her own daughters, who maintained a covert relationship with their aunt.

Following her divorce from Goodrich, de Havilland resumed contact with her sister, visiting Fontaine's New York apartment and spending Christmas together in 1961. The final break between the sisters occurred in 1975 over disagreements regarding their mother's cancer treatment; de Havilland wanted to consult other doctors and supported exploratory surgery but Fontaine disagreed. Fontaine later claimed that de Havilland had not notified her of their mother's death while she was touring with a play, but de Havilland had in fact sent a telegram, which took two weeks to reach her sister. However, according to Fontaine in a 1979 interview with the CBC, de Havilland did not bother to phone to find out where she could be reached. The sibling feud lasted until Fontaine's death on December 15, 2013. (Note: Fontaine once remarked, "I married first, won the Oscar before Olivia did, and if I die first, she'll undoubtedly be livid because I beat her to it!") The following day, de Havilland released a statement saying that she was "shocked and saddened" by the news.

=== Death ===
De Havilland died in her sleep of natural causes at her home in Paris on July 26, 2020, at the age of 104. (Note: De Havilland's publicist, Lisa Goldberg, confirmed that she had died of natural causes in her sleep on Sunday, July 26, 2020. However, due to the wording of some of the announcements (such as her former lawyer Suzelle M. Smith stating de Havilland had died "last night") some media outlets misreported the date of death as the 25th.) Her funeral was held on August 1, 2020, at the American Cathedral in Paris. After cremation, her ashes were placed in the crematorium-columbarium of Père-Lachaise, in an urn later to be transferred to a family burial place on the British island of Guernsey.

== Legacy ==
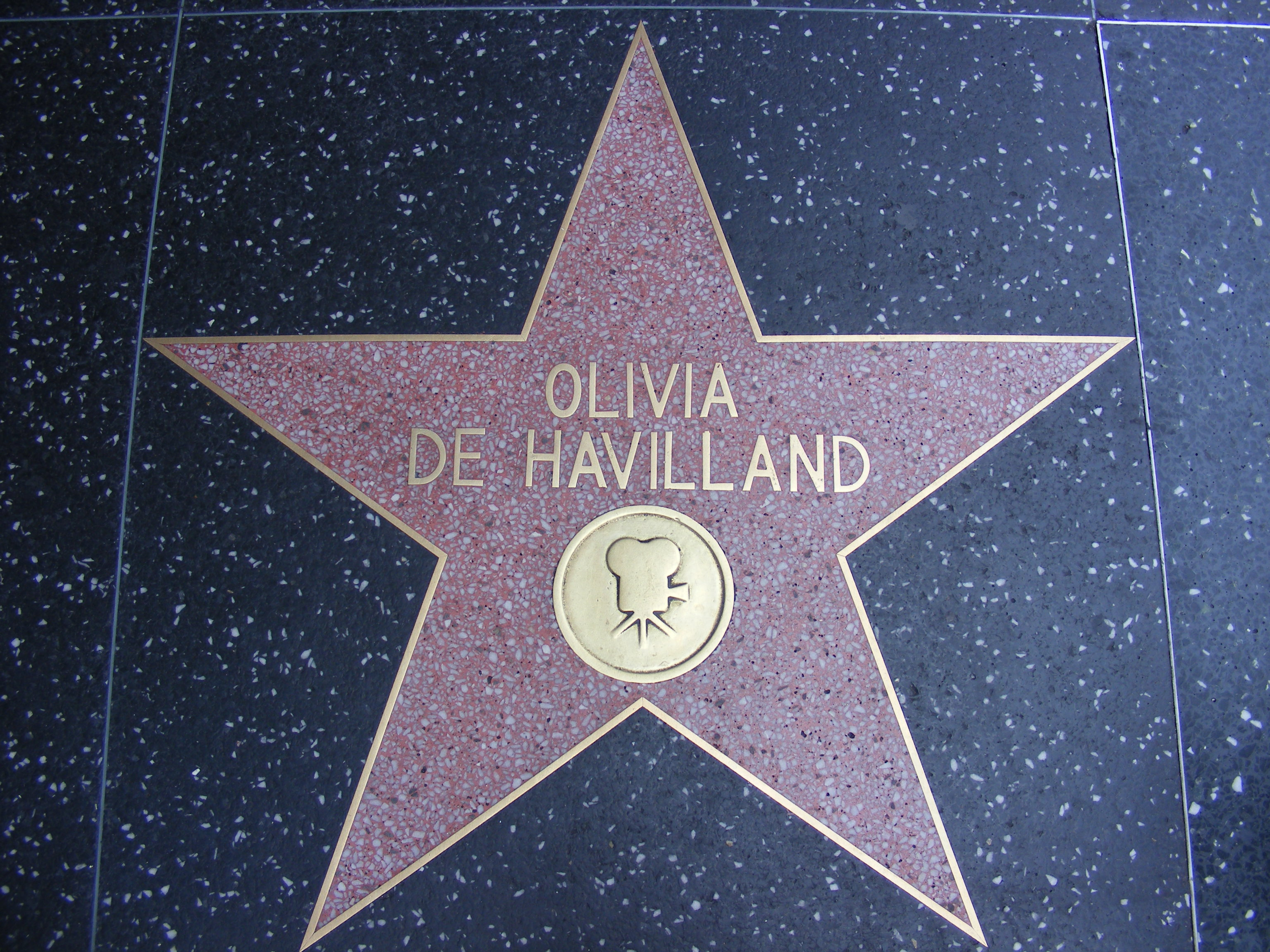
Her star on the Hollywood Walk of Fame, at 6762 Hollywood Blvd.

De Havilland began her acting career playing demure ingénues opposite male stars such as Errol Flynn, with whom she made her breakout film Captain Blood in 1935. Flynn and de Havilland made eight more feature films together and became one of Hollywood's most successful on-screen romantic pairings. De Havilland appeared in 49 feature films, and her range of performances included roles in most major movie genres. Following her film debut in the Shakespeare adaptation A Midsummer Night's Dream, she achieved her initial popularity in romantic comedies, such as The Great Garrick and Hard to Get, and Western adventure films, such as Dodge City and Santa Fe Trail. In her later career, she was most successful in drama films, such as In This Our Life and Light in the Piazza, and psychological dramas in which she played non-glamorous characters in films such as The Dark Mirror, The Snake Pit and Hush...Hush, Sweet Charlotte.

During her career, de Havilland won two Academy Awards (To Each His Own and The Heiress), two Golden Globe Awards (The Heiress and Anastasia: The Mystery of Anna), two New York Film Critics Circle Awards (The Snake Pit and The Heiress), the National Board of Review Award and the Venice Film Festival Volpi Cup (The Snake Pit), and a Primetime Emmy Award nomination (Anastasia: The Mystery of Anna).

For her contributions to the motion picture industry, de Havilland received a star on the Hollywood Walk of Fame on February 8, 1960. She received an honorary doctorate from the University of Hertfordshire in 1998 and from Mills College in 2018. She was one of 500 stars nominated for the American Film Institute's list of 50 greatest screen legends.

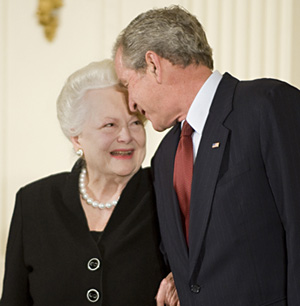
Receiving the National Medal of Arts from President George W. Bush, November 2008

In 2006, she was inducted into the Online Film & Television Association Award Film Hall of Fame.

The moving-image collection of Olivia de Havilland is held at the Academy Film Archive, which includes a preserved nitrate reel of a screen test for Danton, Max Reinhardt's never-produced follow-up to A Midsummer Night's Dream (1935).

As a confidante and friend of Bette Davis, de Havilland is featured in the series Feud: Bette and Joan, where she is portrayed by Catherine Zeta-Jones. In the series, de Havilland reflects on the origins and depth of the Davis–Crawford feud and how it affected contemporary female Hollywood stars. In 2017, she filed suit against FX Networks and producer Ryan Murphy for inaccurately portraying her and using her likeness without permission. Although FX attempted to strike the suit as a strategic lawsuit against public participation, Judge Holly Kendig denied the motion and set trial for November 2017.

In March 2018, an interlocutory appeal of the ruling was argued. A three-justice panel of the California Court of Appeal ruled that the trial court had erred in denying the defendants' motion to strike in a published opinion by Justice Anne Egerton that affirmed the right of filmmakers to embellish the historical record and that such portrayals are protected by the First Amendment. De Havilland appealed the decision to the Supreme Court in September 2018, which declined to review the case.

She was portrayed by Ashlee Lollback in the 2018 Australian biographical film In Like Flynn.

In 2021, the Olivia de Havilland Theater was inaugurated at the American University of Paris.

== Awards ==
Year	Award	Category	Film	Result	Ref
1940	Academy Awards	Best Supporting Actress	Gone with the Wind	Nominated	
1942	Academy Awards	Best Actress	Hold Back the Dawn	Nominated	
1946	Academy Awards	Best Actress	To Each His Own	Won	
1948	Academy Awards	Best Actress	The Snake Pit	Nominated	
1948	National Board of Review	Best Actress	The Snake Pit	Won	
1948	New York Film Critics Circle	Best Actress	The Snake Pit	Won	
1949	Academy Awards	Best Actress	The Heiress	Won	
1949	Golden Globe Awards	Best Actress - Drama	The Heiress	Won	
1949	New York Film Critics Circle	Best Actress	The Heiress	Won	
1949	Venice Film Festival Volpi Cup	Volpi Cup for Best Actress	The Snake Pit	Won	
1953	Golden Globe Awards	Best Actress in a Motion Picture – Drama	My Cousin Rachel	Nominated	
1960	Hollywood Walk of Fame	Star - Motion Pictures	—	Honored	
1986	Golden Globe Awards	Best Performance by an Actress in a Supporting Role	Anastasia: The Mystery of Anna	Won	
1986	Primetime Emmy Award	Outstanding Supporting Actress in a Miniseries	Anastasia: The Mystery of Anna	Nominated	
1998	Honorary Doctorate	University of Hertfordshire	—	Honored	
2006	Online Film & Television Association	Film Hall of Fame	—	Honored	
2008	National Medal of Arts	—	—	Honored	
2010	Chevalier of the Légion d'honneur	—	—	Honored	
2016	Oldie of the Year	—	—	Honored	

== Honors ==
=== National honors ===
Country	Date	Decoration	Post-nominal letters
United States of America	2008 – July 26, 2020	National Medal of Arts	
France	2010 – July 26, 2020	Chevalier of the Légion d'honneur	
United Kingdom	2017 – July 26, 2020	Dame Commander of the Order of the British Empire	DBE

=== Honorary degrees ===
Location	Date	School	Degree	Status
France	1994	American University of Paris	Doctorate	
England	1998	University of Hertfordshire	Doctor of Letters (D.Litt.)	
California	May 12, 2018	Mills College	Doctor of Humane Letters (DHL)	

=== Memberships and fellowships ===
Location	Date	Organization	Position
United States of America	1940 – July 26, 2020	Academy of Motion Picture Arts and Sciences	Member (Actors Branch)
United States of America	1978 – July 26, 2020	American Academy of Achievement	Awards Council Member

== Filmography ==
- Alibi Ike (1935)
- The Irish in Us (1935)
- A Midsummer Night's Dream (1935)
- Captain Blood (1935)
- Anthony Adverse (1936)
- The Charge of the Light Brigade (1936)
- Call It a Day (1937)
- The Great Garrick (1937)
- It's Love I'm After (1937)
- Gold Is Where You Find It (1938)
- The Adventures of Robin Hood (1938)
- Four's a Crowd (1938)
- Hard to Get (1938)
- Wings of the Navy (1939)
- Dodge City (1939)
- The Private Lives of Elizabeth and Essex (1939)
- Gone with the Wind (1939)
- Raffles (1939)
- My Love Came Back (1940)
- Santa Fe Trail (1940)
- The Strawberry Blonde (1941)
- Hold Back the Dawn (1941)
- They Died with Their Boots On (1941)
- The Male Animal (1942)
- In This Our Life (1942)
- Thank Your Lucky Stars (1943)
- Princess O'Rourke (1943)
- Government Girl (1944)
- To Each His Own (1946)
- Devotion (1946)
- The Well Groomed Bride (1946)
- The Dark Mirror (1946)
- The Snake Pit (1948)
- The Heiress (1949)
- My Cousin Rachel (1952)
- That Lady (1955)
- Not as a Stranger (1955)
- The Ambassador's Daughter (1956)
- The Proud Rebel (1958)
- Libel (1959)
- Light in the Piazza (1962)
- Lady in a Cage (1964)
- Hush...Hush, Sweet Charlotte (1964)
- The Adventurers (1970)
- Pope Joan (1972)
- The Screaming Woman (1972)
- Airport '77 (1977)
- The Swarm (1978)
- The Fifth Musketeer (1979)
- I Remember Better When I Paint (2009)

== See also ==
- List of Academy Award winners and nominees from Great Britain
- List of actors with Academy Award nominations
- List of actors with more than one Academy Award nomination in the acting categories
- List of actors with two or more Academy Awards in acting categories
