= Hall Gardner =

Hall Gardner (born January 10, 1954) is a professor of International Politics at the American University of Paris. He received his BA from Colgate University and his MA and PhD from the Paul H. Nitze School of Advanced International Studies (SAIS) at the Johns Hopkins University. He primarily study the origins of war, focusing on its sources and impacts, both local and global and the ways in which such conflicts can be resolved. As a geo-strategist, his comparative historical approach combines theory and contemporary international affairs in dealing with topics such as NATO and the European Union, post-Soviet Union Russia and its effects on China and Eurasia, and the international consequences of the “war on terrorism.”

== Writing ==
In July 2008, Narcissus Press (Rhinebeck, NY) published The Wake-Up Blast, Gardner’s first book of original poems. Barbecue Meltdown, his second book of poetry published by Narcissus Press, is set to appear in 2009. He is working on several other poetry books and novels, including Dolphin Legends and the Man of War, a long prose poem, and Tie Dyed in Blood, a novel inspired by his time spent in China and Vietnam from 1988-1989.

In 2018, Gardner started collaborating with Wall Street International Magazine by publishing a feature article on the risks of America’s new nationalism.

== Bibliography ==
- Averting Global War: Regional Challenges, Overextension, and Options for American Strategy (New York: Palgrave, 2007)
- American Global Strategy and the "War on Terrorism" (Ashgate, 2005)
- NATO and the European Union: New World New Europe New Threats (Ashgate, 2004), Editor and Contributor: Preface; Introduction; Chapter 2: “From Balance to Imbalance of Terror,” Chapter 8: “Toward New Euro-Atlantic, Euro-Mediterranean Security Communities”; Chapter 16: “Preclusive War with Iraq: Regional and Global Ramifications”
- The New Transatlantic Agenda: Facing the Challenges of Global Governance (Ashgate, 2001), Hall Gardner and Radoslava Stefanova, eds. Contributor: Chapter 9, “Russia and China: The Risks of Uncoordinated Transatlantic Strategies” and “Conclusion”
- Central and Southeastern Europe in Transition: Perspectives on Success and Failure Since 1989 (Westport, CT: Praeger Publishers, March 1999). General editor and contributor, “Chapter 10: The Genesis of NATO Enlargement and of War ‘over’ Kosovo”
- Dangerous Crossroads: Europe, Russia, and the Future of NATO (Westport, CT: Praeger, 1997)
- Surviving the Millennium: American Global Strategy, the Collapse of the Soviet Empire and the Question of Peace (Westport, CT and London: Praeger, 1994.)
- NATO’s New Strategy and ESDI: European Security in the New Millennium (Maastricht, Cicero Foundation Press, 1999), eds., Marcel van Herpen; Hall Gardner. Contributor: “Toward Separate – but not Separable- European and Euro-Atlantic Commands”
- The Wake Up Blast (New York: Narcissus Press, 2008)
