= Every Frenchman Has One =

Book by Olivia de Havill

- First edition bookcover
- Author: Olivia de Havilland
- Language: English
- Subject: French life
- Genre: Memoir
- Published: May 2, 1962 (Random House)
- Publication place: United States
- Media type: Print
- Pages: 202
- ISBN: 978-0-451-49739-0 2016 edition
- OCLC: 475546905

Every Frenchman Has One is a book written by American actress Olivia de Havilland. First published in 1962 by Random House, the memoir is a lighthearted account of the author's often amusing attempts to understand and adapt to French life, manners, and customs. In the book, de Havilland writes about French traffic, French maids, French salesladies, French holidays, French law, French doctors, and the French language—all with good humor and affection. After being out of print for decades, the Crown Publishing Group under its Crown Archetype imprint released a new printing on June 28, 2016, to coincide with the author's one-hundredth birthday.

== Synopsis ==
Every Frenchman Has One is a memoir about the author's life in Paris. There is no plot and follows no sequence of events. The book consists of twenty small chapters, each with a focus on some aspect of French life, manners, and customs from the perspective of someone new to the country. Through a series of vignettes and observations, each chapter explores a subject from the author's perspective as she experienced it, conveying the joys and difficulties encountered in her new French life. The title of the book refers to the liver—"the most significant of all human organs as the French constitution is concerned", according to the author.

== Critical response ==
In her review on the Backlots website, Laura Fowler writes, "Olivia de Havilland is an immensely talented and entertaining writer, and each chapter of the book is laugh-out-loud funny. It is evident to the reader just how much de Havilland loves Paris, the French, and living abroad."

== Publishing history ==
Every Frenchman Has One was first published by Random House in 1962. The book sold out its first printing prior to the publication date and went on to become a best-seller. It was first published in Great Britain by Elek Books in 1962 with a second impression appearing in 1963. After being out of print for decades, the Crown Publishing Group under its Crown Archetype imprint will release a new printing on June 28, 2016, to coincide with the author's one-hundredth birthday.
