= Reginald K. Brack =

American businessman and chief executive (1937-2016)

Reginald Kufeld Brack, Jr.
- Born: August 26, 1937; Great Bend, Kansas
- Died: October 4, 2016 (aged 79); Greenwich, Connecticut
- Education: Washington and Lee University (BA)
- Occupations: Businessman, chief executive
- Honours: American Advertising Federation Hall of Fame

Reginald K. Brack Jr. (August 26, 1937 – October 4, 2016) was an American businessman and executive. He is known for his decades spent at Time Inc., which he became the chairman and CEO of in 1990. As of 2001, Brack is listed in the American Advertising Federation Hall of Fame.

== Personal life ==
Brack was born in Great Bend, Kansas on August 26, 1937. He spent his childhood in Dallas. His parents were Edythe Mulveyhill and Reginald Brack, who was an executive at Braniff International Airways.

In 1962, the same year that he joined Time, Brack married Barbara Smith; they had met in St. Louis on a blind date five months prior. They had three children: Reginald Brack, Elizabeth Brack, and Peter Brack.

=== Death ===
On October 4, 2016, at the age of 79, Brack died, due to complications from progressive supranuclear palsy, in his home in Greenwich, Connecticut.

== Career ==
In 1959, Brack graduated from Washington and Lee University and began an ads sales job at The Saturday Evening Post in St. Louis. Three years later, he met Time magazine's publisher on a plane. At the time, Brack had previously applied to work for Time but was initially rejected, but the publisher urged him to "rethink that." A few months later, in 1962, he joined Time as an ads salesman.

At Time, Brack was known for his efforts in augmenting book sales operations and elevating magazines into brands. Over time, he became the ads sales director for Time's international editions and later became the magazine's worldwide sales director. He was additionally known for rejecting "the chummy ethos of cocktail-filled restaurant lunches with colleagues and chose instead to dine with customers." He also supported Time's merger with Warner Communications in 1990.

In 1986, Brack was named the chief executive of Time's magazines division, after which he became Time Inc.'s chief executive, as chairman and CEO, in 1990. He was the first person who had not attended an Ivy League school to lead the corporation. Brack's leadership resulted in the creation and acquisition of several titles such Discover, Martha Stewart Living, Vibe, InStyle, and Entertainment Weekly. He was also responsible for tackling "the company's old-boy culture" by appointing women to positions of leadership, i.e. Elizabeth Valk Long, who became Life's publisher in 1986. On March 11, 1996, Brack, along with Time's chief of correspondents Joelle Attinger and Miami bureau chief Cathy Booth, spoke with Fidel Castro in an "exclusive conversation" regarding Cuba's decision to shoot down two Cessna planes earlier in February.

In 2001, Brack was inducted into the American Advertising Federation Hall of Fame.

Brack was an Honorary Life Trustee of Earthjustice, a role which he held for 19 years in order to develop the nonprofit organization's communications department. He was also a member of the investment club Tiger 21. He sat on numerous boards including that of the Fieldpoint Private Bank and Trust.
