= Peter Brack =

American businessman

Peter Bush Brack
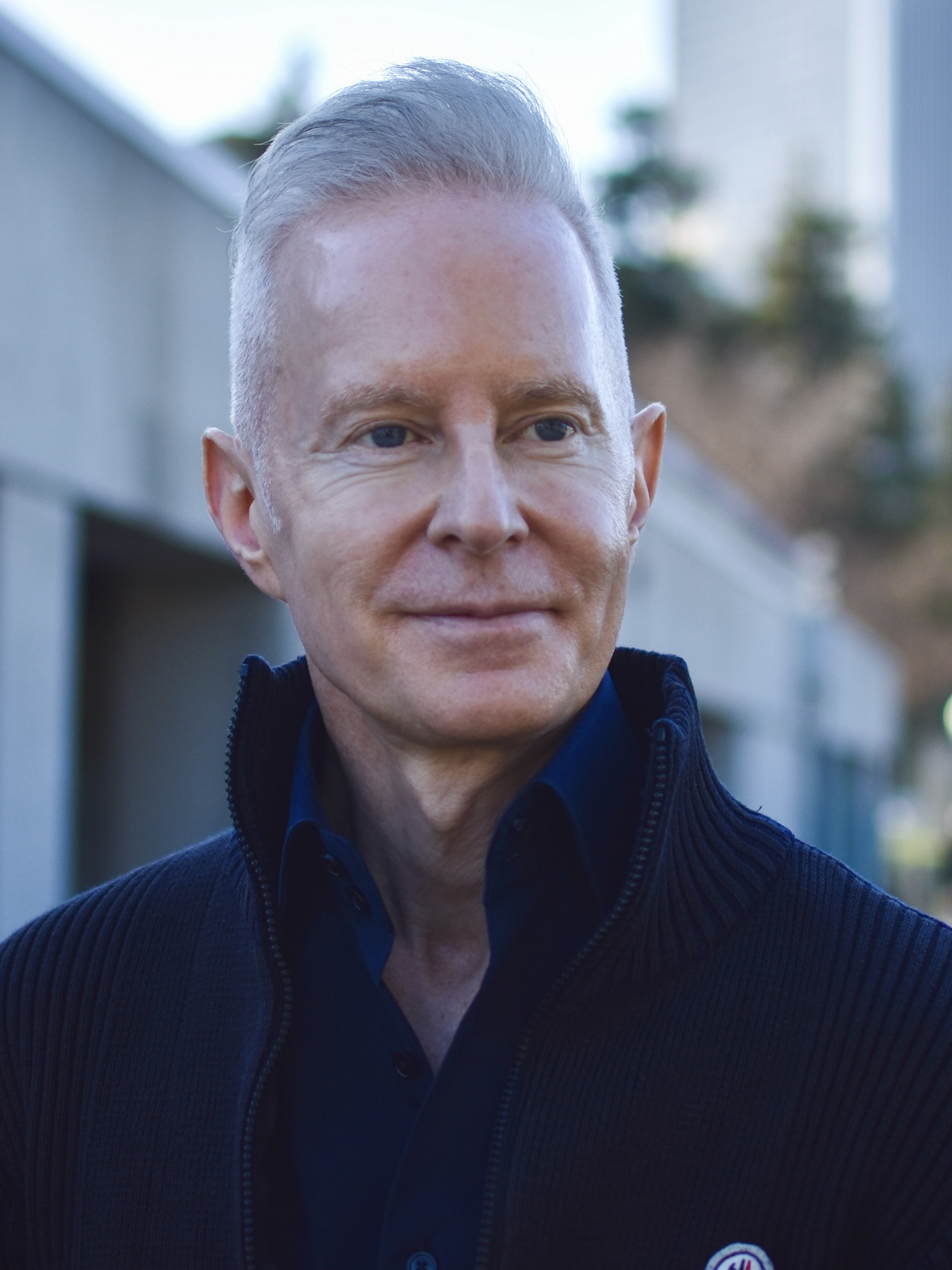
- Brack in 2025
- Education: Tulane University; American University of Paris
- Employer: Hypothesis Ventures
- Known for: Media companies: Redgate Media Holdings, One Media Holdings
- Father: Reginald K. Brack (former chairman and CEO of Time Inc.)

Peter Bush Brack is an American entrepreneur, founder, business leader and investor. In the 1990s, he worked at media companies like CNN, Time Inc. and Time Warner, specifically their bases throughout Asia. Afterward, in the early 2000s, he founded his own media companies, Redgate Media Holdings and One Media Holdings, which acquired and published numerous titles in China, Hong Kong and Taiwan.

In the 2010s, Brack began working in venture capital back in the United States. He first became a venture partner and executive-in-residence at Mucker Capital, after which he became the founding partner at Hypothesis Ventures, a firm investing in tech companies in Opportunity Zones. In 2022, Best Startup named Brack one of the "United States's 101 Top Advisors in the Finance Space".

== Education ==
Brack has a BA from Tulane University. He also attended the American University of Paris.

== Career ==
=== Asian media ===
In 1993, Brack was one of the first employees at Turner Broadcasting System's Hong Kong location. He also managed Time Inc.'s Asiaweek and became the company's senior vice president in Asia. After Time Inc. shuttered Asiaweek in 2001 due to financial losses and an ensuing retrenchment effort, Brack stated: "'We had a plan, and the plan was working up until the middle of this year... Then we got struck by lightning. Nobody could have predicted the severity of this downturn.'' Specifically, Brack cited an existing economic slowdown in Asia paired with the aftermath of the September 11 attacks. Shortly afterward, he was promoted to senior vice president of ad sales at Time and Fortune in Asia. Brack also later served as an executive at Time Warner where he helped launch Cartoon Network in Asia.

=== Media consolidation in Asia ===
In 2003, Brack co-founded and became the CEO of Redgate Media Holdings, a consolidated media company based in China. He stated that Redgate "was principally an investment company" and "its role following any acquisition would therefore be primarily strategic in nature" with regard to the media market in Asia. As such, he closed deals on and acquired numerous titles, publications, and local media companies with the goal of establishing a "network of partner companies to provide seamless deals for advertisers." In 2004, Redgate partnered on a venture with Ming Pao Enterprise Corp. It merged with Inno-Tech Holdings in 2013.

In 2004, Brack co-founded and became the CEO of One Media Holdings, a Hong Kong-based magazine publisher that operated in Hong Kong, mainland China, and Taiwan. It served as the "magazine arm" of Ming Pao Enterprise Group. There, Brack oversaw the release of publications such as Chinese editions of Popular Science, Top Gear, T3, and others publications—in Hong Kong specifically, One Media Holdings published titles like Ming Pao Weekly, City Children Weekly, and Hi Tech Weekly. In 2008, Media Chinese International became the major shareholder of One Media Holdings.

Both Redgate Media Holdings and One Media Holdings went public on the Hong Kong Stock Exchange.

=== Venture capital ===
Brack was a venture partner and executive-in-residence at Mucker Capital, a firm based in Los Angeles, as well as a chairman of Nest Ventures and a vice chairman of the Medici Network. Brack is also one of six founding and managing partners at Hypothesis Ventures, a firm investing in early-stage startup companies in Opportunity Zones.

== Personal life ==
Brack's father was Reginald K. Brack, a former chairman and CEO of Time Inc. and board member of Interpublic Group of Companies.
