= American University of Paris =

Private university college in France

The American University of Paris
- Type: Private university
- Established: 1962; 64 years ago
- President: Sonya Stephens
- Faculty: 140
- Students: 1,280
- Undergraduates: 1,145
- Postgraduates: 135
- Location: Paris, Île-de-France, France; 48.8590°N 2.3037°E
- Campus: Urban, seven buildings
- Website: aup.edu

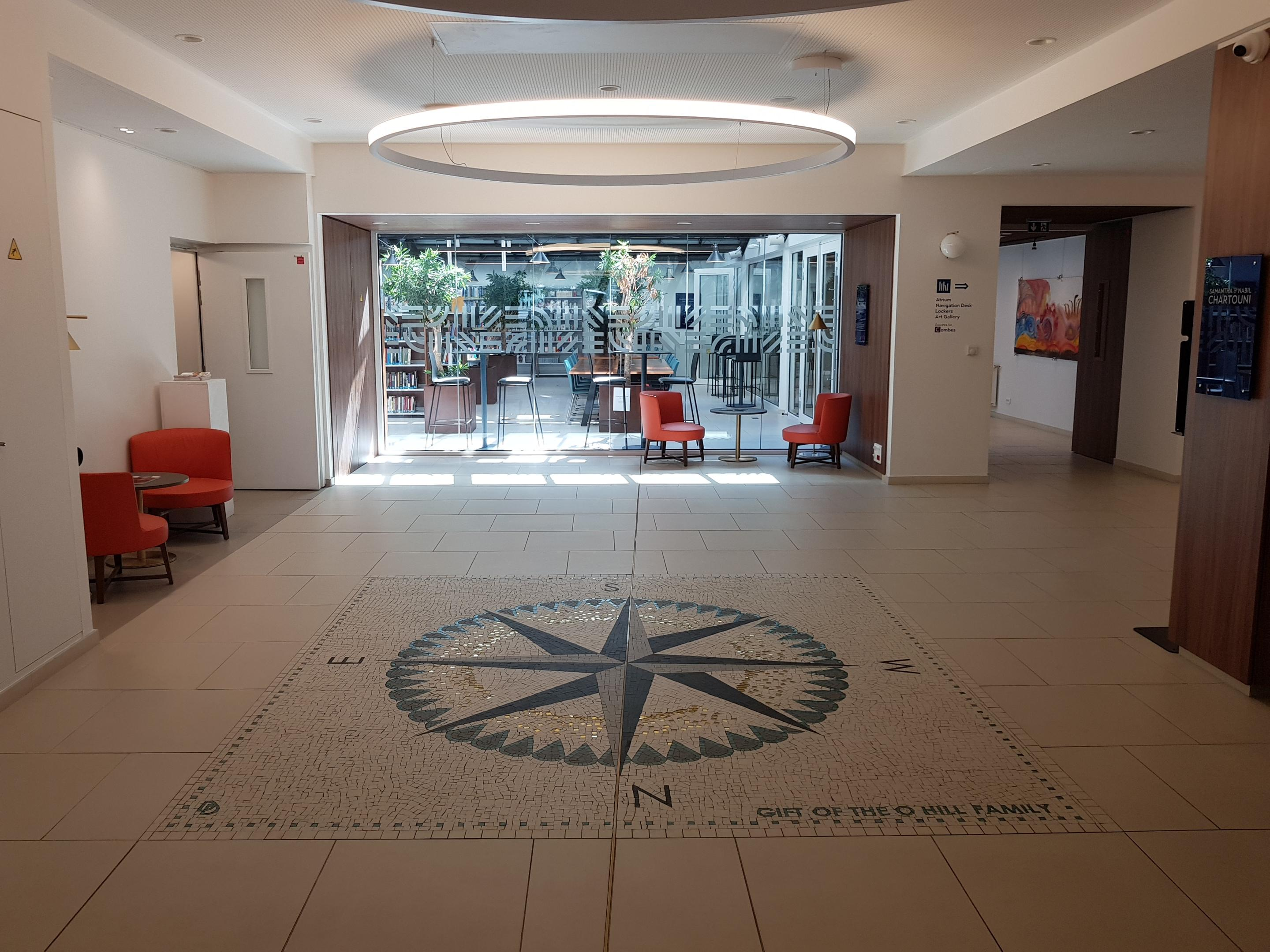
Quai d’Orsay Learning Commons

The American University of Paris (AUP) is a private university in Paris, France. Founded in 1962, the university is one of the oldest American institutions of higher education in Europe, and the first to be established in France. The university campus consists of seven buildings, centrally located in the 7th arrondissement of Paris, on the Left Bank near the Eiffel Tower, Les Invalides, and the Seine.

The university's language of instruction is English, although students must prove a level of proficiency in French prior to graduation. The university has over 1,200 students, representing over 100 nationalities, with an average student-to-faculty ratio of ten to one. The university's faculty members represent 30 nationalities, with 71% holding doctoral degrees and close to 70% speaking three or more languages.

== History ==
Founded by Lloyd DeLamater, a then 40-year-old US Foreign Service officer, in 1962 as the American College in Paris (ACP), the university was renamed 26 years later as The American University of Paris, and it still holds this name today.

ACP was initially a two-year junior college located in the American Church in Paris. Its inaugural class consisted of 100 students, many of whom were children of American service members and expatriates living in France and Europe. Fifteen part-time professors taught courses in Economics, English, Fine Arts, Government History, French, German, Spanish, Mathematics, Philosophy, and Sociology. In 1964, the first 40 students received their diplomas for two years of study, going on to complete their degree in the United States.

Another key aspect of the university's curriculum was its Cultural Program, originally set up by Marie DeLamater, Lloyd DeLamater's wife, and Walter J. Brennan, the first Director of the Cultural Program. The program aimed to provide students with the opportunity to visit museums, monuments, and other cities in order to contextualize theory learned in class. The Cultural Program Office is still organising study trips at AUP today.

ACP's student body changed with time, in part due to the decrease of US military presence in Europe. Thirteen years after its founding, over half of the student body was non-American. In 1978, ACP became an accredited four-year, degree-granting college, which was followed by the change of its name to The American University of Paris in 1988. In the year 2006, the university expanded its course offerings to include master's courses. Most recently, the university consolidated its campus, acquiring several new buildings in the seventh arrondissement: the largest of which is the Quai d’Orsay Learning Commons, on the same street as the American Church in which the university began.

== Accreditation ==
The American University of Paris is accredited in the United States by the Middle States Commission on Higher Education. The American University of Paris is a non-profit educational university incorporated in the state of Delaware and licensed by the State Board of Education as a Delaware institution of higher education. The university confers Bachelor of Arts, Bachelor of Science, Master of Arts, and Master of Science degrees.

The American University of Paris is declared to the Rectorat de Paris as an établissement privé d'enseignement supérieur libre, and has maintained this right to ouverture since 1964. Like other officially US-accredited diplomas, AUP's bachelor's degrees are recognized as an equivalent to the French Licence (BAC+3). This allows AUP students to apply for graduate studies within the French higher education system following the completion of their undergraduate degree.

AUP degrees are also separately recognized by the Ministries of Higher Education in Norway, and Turkey.

== Academics ==
=== Undergraduate programs ===
Undergraduate students must complete the Global Liberal Arts Core Curriculum (GLACC) requirements as part of the curriculum at AUP. The requirements include the demonstration of knowledge in Science, English, French, Mathematics, and the completion of FirstBridge, an interdisciplinary first-year course. The GLACC also includes an experiential learning component, and a Capstone project.

The university offers 28 majors and 35 minors in its undergraduate program, along with courses covering a variety of other subjects, including Art History, Fine Arts, Environmental Science, Gender Studies, Mathematics and Computer Science, and various languages, including French, Latin, Arabic, and Ancient Greek. Most recently, AUP launched a fashion studies major.

The university has 8 academic departments:

- Department of Art History and Fine Arts
- Department of Communication, Media and Culture
- Department of Comparative Literature, English, and Creative Writing
- Department of Computer Science, Mathematics and Environmental Science
- Department of Economics and Management
- Department of French Studies and Modern Languages
- Department of History and Politics
- Department of Psychology, Health and Gender

The university also offers students the possibility of designing their own major, referred to as the Self-Designed Major.

=== Graduate programs ===
The university offers seven graduate programs, several of which have many additional tracks. Coursework Masters include 38 credits of coursework and award a Master of Arts or Master of Science. One Research Masters program is offered with 62 credits of coursework that awards a Master of Arts in International Affairs, Conflict Resolution, and Civil Society Development.

=== Financial aid and scholarships ===
The American University of Paris awards more than 6 million euros in financial assistance every year. The university offers several types of merit-based scholarships, including one specifically for students who have obtained the International Baccalaureate diploma. Based on their final score, students can receive a reduction ranging from €7,000 to up to 100% of tuition. The university also offers university-funded financial aid, which is both need- and merit-based. Scholarships are awarded automatically while students wanting to receive financial aid need to apply for it separately. Total financial assistance ranges from 25% to 50%. A limited number of awards are as high as 100% of tuition. The university is also a Title IV school, which qualifies it to certify U.S. federal loans to American citizens and permanent residents.

== Global Professional Skills Program ==
Undergraduate students are encouraged to take part in the Global Professional Skills (GPS) Program, which launched in spring 2017. The aim of GPS is to improve career-focused skills and help students develop a personal narrative that will benefit them after graduation. Running throughout a student's entire time at AUP, the program ends with an opportunity to present a personal narrative to a panel of alumni, employers, and faculty. The winning submission receives an award at graduation.

In addition, the GPS Program brings together students’ co-curricular achievements on a personal co-curricular record (CCR). Students’ activities are registered from semester to semester through attendance tracking, synced through AUP's student-facing online campus activity platform (AUP Engage). Students who complete GPS Program requirements will also earn a GPS Certificate and a mention of GPS achievement is added to their official AUP academic transcript.

The GPS program is structured around AUP's faculty-defined four core capabilities:

- Professional: Independent, Creative Thinkers
- Cultural Fluency: Adaptable Communicators with a Global Perspective
- Leadership: Responsible, Empowered Leaders
- Personal: Engaged, Lifelong Learners

The GPS Program consists of the following three program requirements plus a fourth optional Panel Presentation.

1. Minimum involvement requirement: This is referred to as the GPS path, which exists on AUP Engage. This involves attending a minimum number of events and activities that feed into each of the four pillars listed above.
2. Designing Your Narrative (DYN) Workshop: This design thinking workshop for seniors (open to all, regardless of GPS participation) helps students make explicit the connections between experiences at university and post-graduation plans. This two-hour workshop promotes strategies for how students can “pitch” themselves to prospective employers, graduate school admissions decision-makers, investors, etc. They are given the guidelines for how to translate all of this into their Personal Narrative – the third and final requirement for the GPS Program.
3. Personal Narrative Submission: Students identify a specific objective, and then construct a narrative imagining they are presenting themselves in the context of that objective – to an employer, graduate school admissions counsellor, angel investor, etc. The format of the narrative is open, but common formats include PowerPoint/Prezi, video, website, portfolio, essay, etc.
4. (Optional) Panel Presentations and Coaching Sessions: In addition to the three program requirements, GPS seniors have the option to present their personal narrative to a panel of AUP alumni, employers, and faculty in April of their senior year. Participants get immediate constructive feedback on their presentations, and top presenters are invited to the GPS President's panel, which takes place during the GPS Award Ceremony, just before commencement. To prepare for the panel presentations (and in so doing, prepare for interviews), the Careers and Internships Office organizes a large number of collective drop-in style coaching sessions.

== Cultural Program ==
The Cultural Program provides students with the opportunity to participate in cultural excursions, faculty-led study trips, and other activities. They range from one-day trips to month-long excursions to a variety of destinations across the globe including London, Iceland, Rome, Istanbul, Fez and Auroville, India. The Coup de Pouce fund gives students the possibility to apply for financial assistance for faculty-led study trips.

== Campus ==
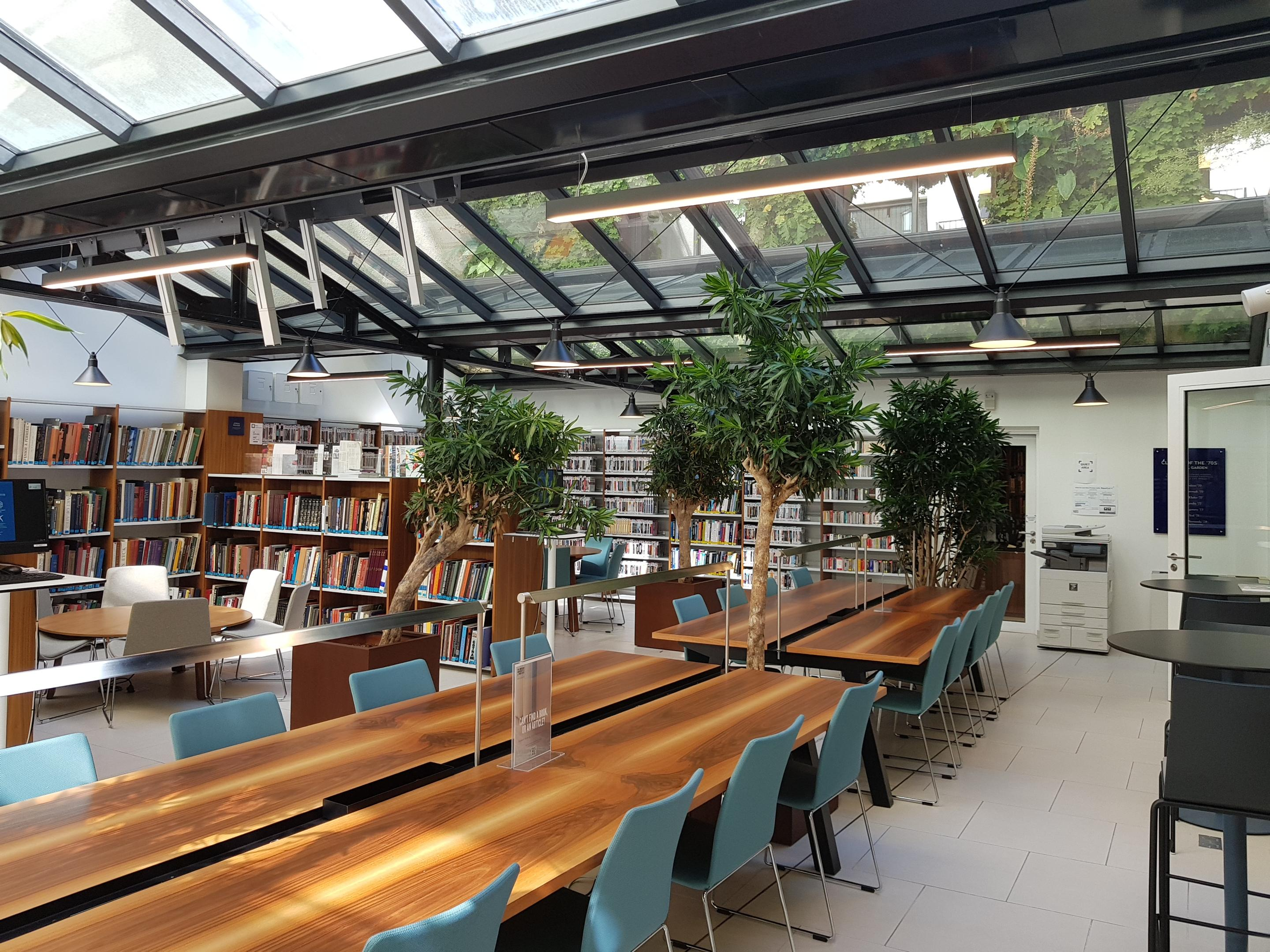
The atrium library in the Learning Commons.

The university is located in the 7th arrondissement of Paris, on the left bank close to the Eiffel Tower, the Seine River and the Invalides. Its urban campus consists of seven buildings.

In 2014, the university began a campus renovation plan to renovate every university building. The Combes building was renovated in 2014 and became the Combes Student Life Center, housing the university's own AMEX Café, student clubs, student government, the Thamer Salman Media Center, and the Joy and Edward Frieman Environmental Science Center, as well as art studios, faculty offices, classrooms and the AUP Fine Arts Gallery. The gallery, founded in 2003 by Professor Emeritus Ralph Petty, has welcomed over 120 exhibitions to date and is today curated by Jonathan Shimony, a Professor of Fine Arts.

In 2015, the university's administration moved into a renovated building on Boulevard de La Tour-Maubourg. In 2019, the university finished renovations on a newly acquired building, which is now known as the Quai d'Orsay Learning Commons. The building consists of 2000 square meters over ten floors. It houses many classes for students, AUP Library, Academic Resource Center, and an integrated center for academic, career and experiential advising. It connects to the Combes Student Life Center via a glass atrium. The two buildings together form the Student Life and Learning Commons, which between them centralize all student services in a single building complex. Finally, the Monttessuy Center for the Arts was created in the library's former home at 9, rue de Monttessuy, which houses classrooms, studio spaces and the university's first auditorium, the Olivia de Havilland Theater..

== Library ==
The university library is in the Quai d'Orsay Learning Commons. It has over 41,000 books, more than 1,100,000 electronic books, 2,900 DVDs and videos, and access to other libraries around Paris. The university library also provides a collection of online resources including e-books, e-encyclopedias, e-journals, and full text databases. The AUP Library is a founding member of the AMICAL Consortia, an international consortium of 28 American‐modeled institutions in 19 different countries, and is a member of the French library consortium Couperin.

== Athletics ==
The first sports team at the university was founded one year after the university's creation in 1962. Over the following decades, other sports teams were introduced, some of which are still active at AUP today, including volleyball, dance, basketball, futsal, and equestrian sports.

After the re-establishment of a small sports activities program in Fall 2008, today's teams participate regularly in Regional University Championships (CRSU) with various teams. Students can go to tryouts and integrate competitive teams, but also have the possibility to engage in recreational activities.

Due to its collaboration with local sports clubs and fitness companies, AUP students benefit from preferential deals for gym memberships. The Athletics Office also supports students in launching their own sports team/club at the university.

The AUP Athletics Office also organizes charity events, to which student athletes contribute.

== Student life ==
As of the Fall 2024 semester, the university hosted 1,280 students with over 100 nationalities represented on campus.

Students have the opportunity to learn and meet other students through clubs and organizations, including AUP for Consent, AUP Oslo Pax Club, Migrant Justice Club, the AUP Model UN Club, AUP Cares (philanthropic club), AUP Green (environmental club), the Student Government Association (SGA), and the Graduate Student Council (GSC).

Students also manage student-run media production for print, digital and broadcast media. They produce the Peacock Magazine, write articles for The Plume, a news student-run news website, and film videos for Peacock TV, the university's own student-run video production club. The AUP Radio Club also organizes a daily radio show. The university supports student media through three media workshops that allow students to get involved in production teams, overseen by faculty and staff.

Students live in the city of Paris. All incoming first-year, transfer, and visiting students are required to arrange their housing through the university, either in a shared student apartment, or in a home stay. Graduate students or returning undergraduate students have the option of searching for an independent apartment with the assistance of the Office of Residential Life.

The Academic Resource Center (ARC) was created to link technology to the curriculum and to supplement academic support services at the university. Located in the Quai d’Orsay Learning Commons, ARC provides multiple services to students, including library research stations and video production equipment, peer tutoring services, and a writing lab.

== Notable faculty ==
- Jim Bittermann - senior European correspondent for CNN in Paris
- Oliver Feltham - philosopher
- Matthew Fraser - British-Canadian academic, author and former journalist. He was the former editor at the Post and co-hosted a weekly CBC Newsworld television show, "Inside Media"
- Hall Gardner - professor of International Politics
- Ziad Majed - political researcher
- Ali Rahnema - economist and historian

== Notable alumni ==
The university has over 23,000 alumni who work and live in 145 countries. A study of more recent graduates indicates that 93% are employed or pursue graduate studies within one year of graduation. The majority of alumni report that AUP was helpful in their career paths. Half of alumni reported that they were pursuing graduate or professional studies three years out. Nine out of ten alumni are fluent in two or more languages, and 87% say that their careers have an international element. More than half also having worked in a country not native to them.

Individuals of note who have attended the university include:

- Cleo von Adelsheim - German noblewoman and actress
- Diana Álvares Pereira de Melo, 11th Duchess of Cadaval - Portuguese noblewoman
- Tarak Ben Ammar - movie producer and distributor
- Pamella Bordes - Indian model, photographer and Femina Miss India Universe 1982
- Peter Brack – entrepreneur, founder, business leader and investor
- Andrea Casiraghi - fourth in line to the Monegasque throne
- KC Concepcion - actress, singer, VJ, model, stage actress and ambassador against hunger of the UN's World Food Programme (WFP)
- Eva Green - French actress and model
- Jafar Hassan - Prime Minister of Jordan
- Jake Heggie - American composer and pianist
- Tara Jarmon - Canadian fashion designer
- Alex Ko - Broadway star Billy Elliot the Musical; author; award-winning film writer/director
- Claire Lademacher - German bioethicist and princess of Luxembourg
- Peggy Lehner - former Ohio State Senator
- Olivia Palermo - American socialite and fashion designer, features on the MTV reality show The City
- Fernando Rees - Brazilian professional race car driver
- Daniel Rose - American chef based in Paris
- Sultan Sooud Al Qassemi – translator, art curator and journalist
- Elisabeth von Thurn und Taxis - German princess and blogger
- Michael J. Varhola - American author, editor, and publisher
- Michael Weatherly - American actor

== See also ==
- American University (disambiguation) for a list of similarly named institutions
- AUC Press
- Cairo International Model United Nations
