= De Havilland (disambiguation) =

de Havilland is a defunct British aviation manufacturer established in 1920.

de Havilland may also refer to:

== Organisations ==
- de Havilland Engine Company, offshoot of the original British de Havilland aircraft building company later taken over by Rolls-Royce
- de Havilland Canada, former subsidiary of the original, now independent and the only remaining aircraft manufacturer bearing this name
- de Havilland Australia former subsidiary, later merged into Boeing Australia
- De Havilland Aviation, a jet engineering company founded in 1988, based at Bournemouth Airport, England
- DeHavilland, a UK-based political information company
- De Havilland College, a UK college until 1991 and now the Welwyn Garden City Campus of Oaklands College

== People ==
- Sir Geoffrey de Havilland (1882–1965), founder of the aircraft company
- Geoffrey Raoul de Havilland (1910–1946), test pilot, son of Sir Geoffrey
- Hereward de Havilland (1894–1976), British aviator, brother of Sir Geoffrey
- Joan de Beauvoir de Havilland (1917–2013), British-American actress, daughter of Walter and sister of Olivia
- John Thomas de Havilland (1918–1943), test pilot, son of Sir Geoffrey
- Olivia de Havilland (1916–2020), British-American actress, daughter of Walter and sister of Joan
- Sir Peter de Havilland (1747–1821), Bailiff of Guernsey and great-grandfather of Walter
- Thomas Fiott de Havilland (1775–1866), army officer and son of Sir Peter
- Walter Augustus de Havilland (1872–1968), British patent attorney and Go player, half-uncle of Sir Geoffrey
- William Lee de Havilland (born 1994), English professional footballer

== See also ==
- De Havilland family
- Havilland Hall, Guernsey
- Haviland (disambiguation)
