= De Havilland family =

Anglo-Norman family

The de Havilland family is an Anglo-Norman family, belonging to landed gentry that originated from mainland Normandy and settled in Guernsey in the Middle Ages. A branch of the family resided for many years at Havilland Hall near Saint Peter Port in Guernsey.

== Family members by birth ==
- Peter de Havilland (1747–1821), Bailiff of Guernsey and great-grandfather of Walter
- Thomas de Havilland (1775–1866), army officer and son of Sir Peter
- Walter de Havilland (1872–1968), British patent attorney and Go player, half-uncle of Sir Geoffrey
- Geoffrey de Havilland (1882–1965), founder of the aircraft company
- Hereward de Havilland (1894–1976), British aviator, brother of Sir Geoffrey
- Geoffrey de Havilland Jr. (1910–1946), test pilot, son of Sir Geoffrey
- Olivia de Havilland (1916–2020), British-American actress, daughter of Walter and sister of Joan
- Joan de Beauvoir de Havilland, known as Joan Fontaine (1917–2013), British-American actress, daughter of Walter and sister of Olivia
- John de Havilland (1918–1943), test pilot, son of Sir Geoffrey
- Will de Havilland (born 1994), English professional footballer

== Family members by marriage ==
- Brian Aherne (1902–1986), actor and husband of Joan
- William Dozier (1908–1991), actor and husband of Joan
- Lilian Fontaine (1886–1975), actress and wife of Walter and mother of Olivia and Joan
- Marcus Goodrich (1897–1991), screenwriter and husband of Olivia
- Collier Young (1908–1980), film producer and husband of Joan

== Family tree ==
Geoffrey de Havilland section of the family tree

Alice Jeannette (née Saunders); 1854–1911	Rev. Charles de Havilland; 1854–1920	Walter de Havilland; 1872–1968	Lilian Fontaine (Ruse); 1886–1975
Ivon Molesworth Charles Jordan de Havilland; 1879–1905	Louise Thomas -1949	Captain Sir Geoffrey de Havilland; 1882–1965	Joan Mary Frith; 1900–1974	Hereward de Havilland; 1894–1976	Marcus Goodrich; 1897–1991	Olivia Mary de Havilland; 1916–2020	Pierre Galante; 1909-1998	Joan de Beauvoir de Havilland; 1917–2013	William McElroy Dozier; 1908–1991
son	Geoffrey de Havilland Jr. 1910–1946	John de Havilland; 1918–1943	son	daughter	daughter
