= Haviland =

Haviland can refer to:

== People ==
- Haviland (given name)
- Aslaug Haviland (1913–2003), deaf and blind Norwegian woman and motivational speaker
- Chris Haviland (born 1952), Australian politician
- David B. Haviland (born 1961), Swedish-American physicist
- Edna Haviland (1896–1981), Canadian chemist
- Frank Burty Haviland (1886–1971), French Cubist painter
- George Darby Haviland (1857–1901), British surgeon and naturalist
- James W. Haviland (1911–2007), American doctor and specialist in Internal Medicine
- John Haviland (1792–1852), English-born American architect
- John Haviland (physician) (1785–1851), English professor of medicine at Cambridge
- John Kenneth Haviland (1921–2002), American pilot who flew for the Royal Air Force during the Battle of Britain
- Julian Haviland (1930–2023), British journalist
- Laura Smith Haviland (1808–1898), American abolitionist, suffragette and social reformer
- Mike Haviland (born 1967), American ice hockey coach
- Paul Haviland (1880–1950), French-American photographer, writer and arts critic
- Stanley Haviland (1899–1972), Australian public servant
- Thomas Heath Haviland Sr. (1795 or 1796–1867), English-born landowner, banker and political figure in Prince Edward Island
- Thomas Heath Haviland (1822–1895), Canadian lawyer, politician and father of Canadian Confederation
- Virginia Haviland (1911–1988), American author and Library of Congress librarian
- William Haviland (1718–1784), Irish-born general in the British Army
- Willis Bradley Haviland (1890–1944), member of the Lafayette Escadrille, first pilot to launch a plane from a battleship
- Haviland Morris (born 1959), American actress
- Haviland Routh (1871–1959), Canadian ice hockey player
- Haviland Smith, retired CIA station chief

== Places in the United States ==
- Haviland, Kansas, a city
  - Haviland Crater, an astrobleme
- Haviland, New York, a community and census-designated place
- Haviland, Ohio, a village

== Things ==
- Haviland, a mark of Necco, a candy company
- Haviland & Co., a manufacturer of Limoges porcelain in France

== See also ==
- de Havilland (disambiguation)
