= Marcus Goodrich =

American screenwriter and novelist

- Born: November 28, 1897; San Antonio, Texas, U.S
- Died: October 20, 1991 (aged 93); Richmond, Virginia, U.S.
- Occupations: Screenwriter, novelist
- Notable work: Delilah
- Spouse: Olivia de Havilland (m. 1946; div. 1953)
- Children: 1

Marcus Aurelius Goodrich (November 28, 1897 – October 20, 1991) was an American screenwriter and novelist.

He was the first husband of the actress Olivia de Havilland. Their only son, Benjamin, was born on September 27, 1949. He was previously married to Elizabeth Norton, Henriette Alice McCrea-Metcalf, Caroline Sleeth, and Renee Oakman.

He associated with the Ernest Hemingway group in Paris and was a protégé of Philip Wylie. He is best known for his 1941 novel Delilah.

de Havilland family tree

Alice Jeannette (née Saunders); 1854–1911	Rev. Charles de Havilland; 1854–1920	Walter de Havilland; 1872–1968	Lilian Fontaine (Ruse); 1886–1975
Ivon Molesworth Charles Jordan de Havilland; 1879–1905	Louise Thomas c. 1879–1949	Captain Sir Geoffrey de Havilland; 1882–1965	Joan Mary Frith; 1900–1974	Hereward de Havilland; 1894–1976	Marcus Goodrich; 1897–1991	Olivia Mary de Havilland; 1916–2020	Pierre Galante; 1909–1998	Joan de Beauvoir de Havilland; 1917–2013	William McElroy Dozier; 1908–1991
Peter Jason de Havilland; 1913–1977	Geoffrey de Havilland Jr. 1910–1946	John de Havilland; 1918–1943	Benjamin Goodrich; 1949–1991	Gisèle Galante; 1956–	Deborah Leslie; 1949–
