= John de Havilland (pilot) =

British test pilot

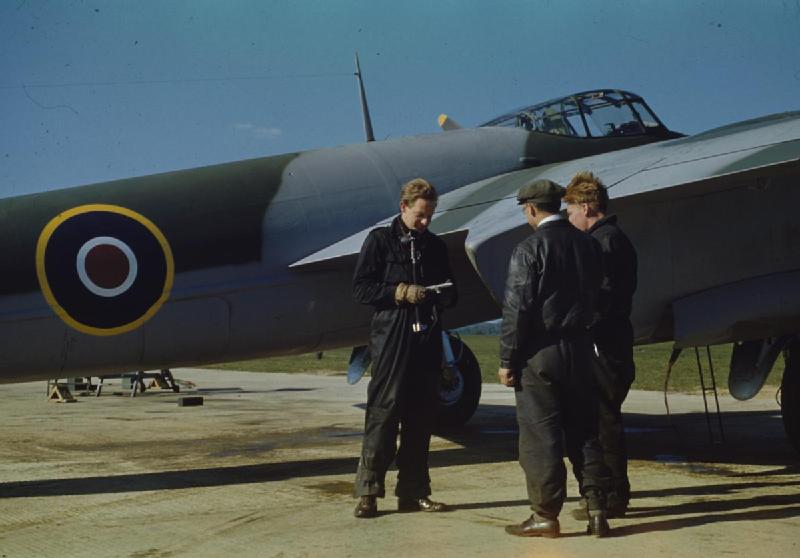
- John de Havilland (left) checking the flight log book with two fitters beside a Mosquito after a test flight, 1943
- Born: 17 October 1918; Edgware, Middlesex, England
- Died: 23 August 1943 (aged 24); Hatfield, Hertfordshire, England
- Occupation: Test pilot
- Father: Geoffrey de Havilland

John de Havilland (17 October 1918 – 23 August 1943) was a British test pilot.

John and his brothers, Geoffrey de Havilland Jr. and Peter, were sons of Geoffrey de Havilland, the famous designer and manufacturer. All three brothers were pilots and flew as test pilots for the de Havilland company. John had been a sergeant in the Royal Air Force Volunteer Reserve (RAFVR) prior to the Second World War. Due to the demands for pilots in the de Havilland company, he was released from service and joined his father's firm.

== Death ==
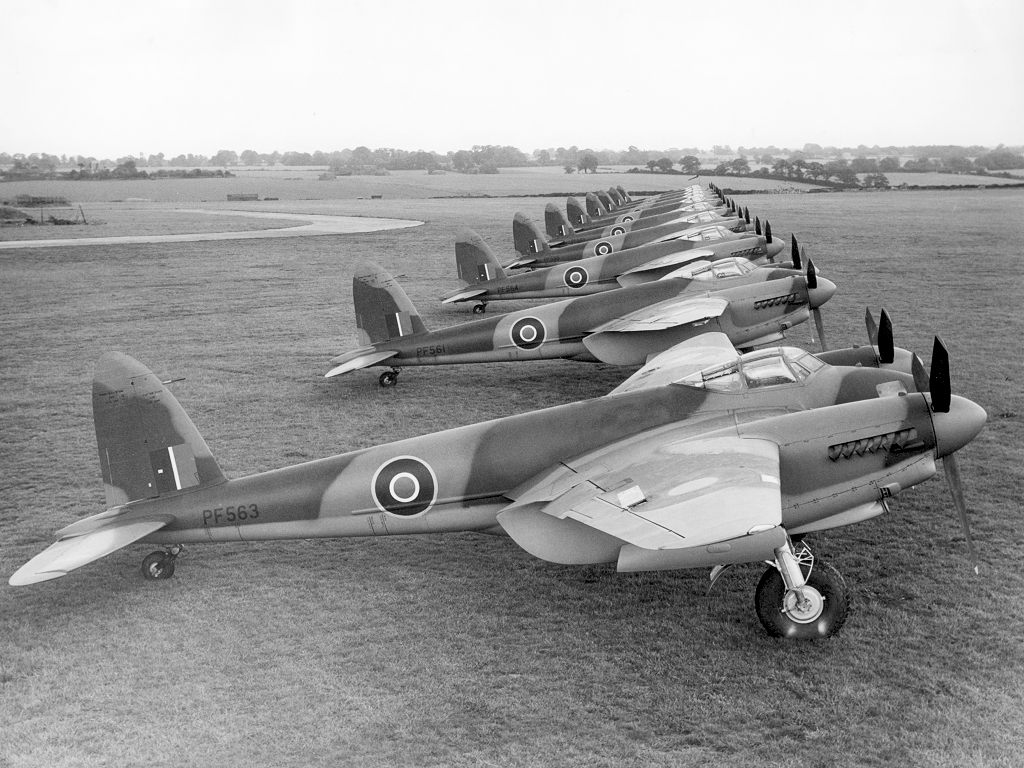
Mosquito aircraft outside the Hatfield factory

During a test flight of a de Havilland Mosquito Mark VI, flying with flight test observer John H. F. Scrope, he collided in the vicinity of St Albans with another Mosquito Mark VI flown by pilot George Gibbins, with flight test observer Godfrey J. Carter. Both aircraft disintegrated in the air, killing all four occupants aboard.

His elder brother Geoffrey Jr also died in an aircraft accident three years later, whilst carrying out high-speed tests in the de Havilland DH 108 TG306 which broke up over the Thames Estuary, on 27 September 1946.

== Legacy ==
The John de Havilland Scholarship Fund was set up by Geoffrey de Havilland after his son's death. The award is associated with the aviation industry and its purpose is to develop the industry by recognising exceptional young people who will enter the profession.

de Havilland family tree

Alice Jeannette (née Saunders); 1854–1911	Rev. Charles de Havilland; 1854–1920	Walter de Havilland; 1872–1968	Lilian Fontaine (Ruse); 1886–1975
Ivon Molesworth Charles Jordan de Havilland; 1879–1905	Louise Thomas c. 1879–1949	Captain Sir Geoffrey de Havilland; 1882–1965	Joan Mary Frith; 1900–1974	Hereward de Havilland; 1894–1976	Marcus Goodrich; 1897–1991	Olivia Mary de Havilland; 1916–2020	Pierre Galante; 1909–1998	Joan de Beauvoir de Havilland; 1917–2013	William McElroy Dozier; 1908–1991
Peter Jason de Havilland; 1913–1977	Geoffrey de Havilland Jr. 1910–1946	John de Havilland; 1918–1943	Benjamin Goodrich; 1949–1991	Gisèle Galante; 1956–	Deborah Leslie; 1949–
