= Haviland (given name) =

Haviland is a unisex given name, a transferred use of the surname and place name. According to one source, the name is derived from the place name Haverhill, Suffolk, England, which was originally called Haverland. The name is derived from a combination of the Old English words hafod, meaning ‘’shelter’’, and ‘’land’’. The name can also be derived from a Norman French surname meaning "goat land." The name has been in occasional use for both boys and girls in North America since the 19th century.

== Men ==
- Haviland Routh (1871–1959), Canadian ice hockey player
- Haviland Smith (1929–2024), American CIA official

== Women ==
- Haviland Haines Lund (1871–1952), American activist
- Haviland Morris (born 1959), American actress
- Mary Haviland Stilwell Kuesel (1866–1936), American dentist
