= The Bigamist (1953 film) =

1953 film noir directed by Ida Lupino

- Directed by: Ida Lupino
- Screenplay by: Collier Young
- Story by: Lawrence B. Marcus; (as Larry Marcus); Lou Schor
- Produced by: Robert Eggenweiler; Collier Young
- Starring: Joan Fontaine; Edmond O'Brien; Ida Lupino; Edmund Gwenn
- Cinematography: George E. Diskant
- Edited by: Stanford Tischler
- Music by: Leith Stevens
- Production company: The Filmakers
- Distributed by: Filmakers Releasing Organization
- Release date: December 3, 1953 (United States)
- Running time: 80 minutes
- Country: United States
- Language: English
- Budget: $50,000 (negative cash cost)
- Box office: $700,000

The Bigamist is a 1953 American drama film noir directed by Ida Lupino starring herself, Joan Fontaine, Edmond O'Brien, and Edmund Gwenn. Producer/Screenwriter Collier Young was married to Fontaine at the time and had previously been married to Lupino. The Bigamist has been cited as the first American feature film made in the sound era in which the female star of a film directed herself.

== Plot ==
Harry and Eve Graham want to adopt a child, as Eve is infertile. Adoption agent Mr. Jordan advises the couple that, as a matter of routine, he needs to investigate their backgrounds and current lifestyle thoroughly. Harry responds with a worried, pensive look, which concerns Jordan.

Harry and Eve live in San Francisco and are co-owners of a business, with Harry travelling to Los Angeles frequently for work. Jordan arrives at Harry's Los Angeles office looking for information about Harry. The receptionist calls around to all the hotels, but none of them have a Harry Graham registered. One or two of the managers remember Harry, but he hasn't checked into their hotels in months. Jordan is puzzled and even more determined to investigate Harry. He visits the address listed in the phone book for a "Harrison Graham" and there finds Harry, with a different wife—and a baby. When Jordan is about to call the police, Harry tells him, via a lengthy flashback, how he got into this situation.

Upon learning of Eve's infertility, Harry suggested that she join him in his business as a means of coping with her disappointment. Though she had done well at work, she soon began to focus solely on the business, leaving Harry feeling lonely. While staying in L.A., Harry met an interesting woman named Phyllis on a bus tour of Hollywood movie stars' homes. They spent time together but parted, with Harry not expecting to see her again.

Talking on the phone with Eve that night, Harry tried to tell her about Phyllis and his loneliness, but Eve was interested only in talking about business. Back home, he tried again to explain how he believed they needed to work at becoming closer. He suggested planning a vacation together but she dismissed the idea, saying she was pleased with the state of their marriage. In L.A., Harry began seeing Phyllis again, platonically at first, but romantic feelings developed. Not wanting to fall in love, Phyllis had not allowed Harry to share with her anything about his background and thus remained ignorant of his marriage. On Harry's last night in town, they spent the night together.

Back home, Harry resolved to rededicate himself to his marriage, and planned for someone else to handle the L.A. business. Eve was fully receptive, and she apologized for having been so emotionally distant. She embraced the idea of their adopting a child after having rejected it years before. At this point her father took ill and she had to spend time with her family in Florida.

Harry stayed at home and began the adoption process. Three months later, with Eve still away, Harry had to return to L.A. to tend to business interests there. He discovered Phyllis was pregnant. She told Harry that she did not wish to trap him and that he was free to leave. Harry would not turn his back on the responsibility he felt toward her and to their child. He planned to call Eve, confess his infidelity, and ask for a divorce, but then came news of her father's death. Hearing how distraught she was he could not go through with his plan, but also could not abandon Phyllis, and instead married her bigamously. With Eve pinning all of her hopes for happiness on becoming a mother, Harry had hoped to maintain his secret double life long enough for the adoption to be finalized and then divorce Eve, who would then at least still have her child.

In the present, upon hearing the story, Jordan leaves without calling the police, expressing that he both despises and pities Harry. Harry writes a farewell letter to the sleeping Phyllis and leaves the house. Eve returns to San Francisco as Harry is about to meet the police who are waiting for him outside their home. Harry is tried for bigamy, and his two wives finally meet in court. The judge notes that once Harry has served his sentence, he will be legally obliged to support both women. With regard to Harry's personal life, "it won't be a question of which woman he'll go back to, but rather which woman will take him back." The film ends with Harry awaiting his sentencing hearing.

== Cast ==
- Joan Fontaine as Eve Graham
- Ida Lupino as Phyllis Martin
- Edmund Gwenn as Mr. Jordan
- Edmond O'Brien as Harry Graham / Harrison Graham
- Kenneth Tobey as Tom Morgan, Defense Attorney
- Jane Darwell as Mrs. Connelley
- Peggy Maley as Phone Operator
- Lilian Fontaine as Miss Higgins, Landlady

== Production ==
Filming began on June 29, 1953, in San Francisco, California, and was planned to last for two weeks. Its production fell into difficulty when RKO Pictures pulled out of the picture, leaving Filmakers to distribute it.

== Reception ==
The Bigamist received rave reviews at the time of release, with Howard Thompson of The New York Times calling it "Filmakers' best offering, to date". The plot cheekily mines aspects of Lupino's own private life (sharing same scriptwriting husband with Fontaine; an extramarital pregnancy with Howard Duff) and showcases the Hollywood homes of some of her friends on a see-the-stars bus-tour, including a specific reference to supporting actor Gwenn's Oscar-winning performance in Miracle on 34th Street (1947).

The film has since earned acclaim from critics and is included in the book 1001 Movies You Must See Before You Die. Chris Fujiwara calls it a "haunting film" which is "one of several out-of-nowhere masterpieces" to be directed by Lupino. He particularly praises the final courtroom scene, which he considers to be "shattering", with a "combination of ambiguity and intensity that recalls both Carl Dreyer and Nicholas Ray". When the two female leads exchange glances with each other in court they both knew what it meant to be married to the same man in real life—an inside joke not lost on Hollywood.

The Encyclopedia of Film Noir considers The Bigamist to be "unusually ambiguous" for the period. Ray Hagen and Laura Wagner remark that The Bigamist is "not a sensationalized rendering of a potentially sordid subject, but a very human story of a man (Edmond O'Brien) tangled between two women".

Leonard Maltin gave it a three-star rating, calling it "one of Lupino's best directorial efforts".

== See also ==
- The Hitch-Hiker (1953), also directed by Lupino in the same year.
