= Geoffrey de Havilland Jr. =

British test pilot (1910–1946)

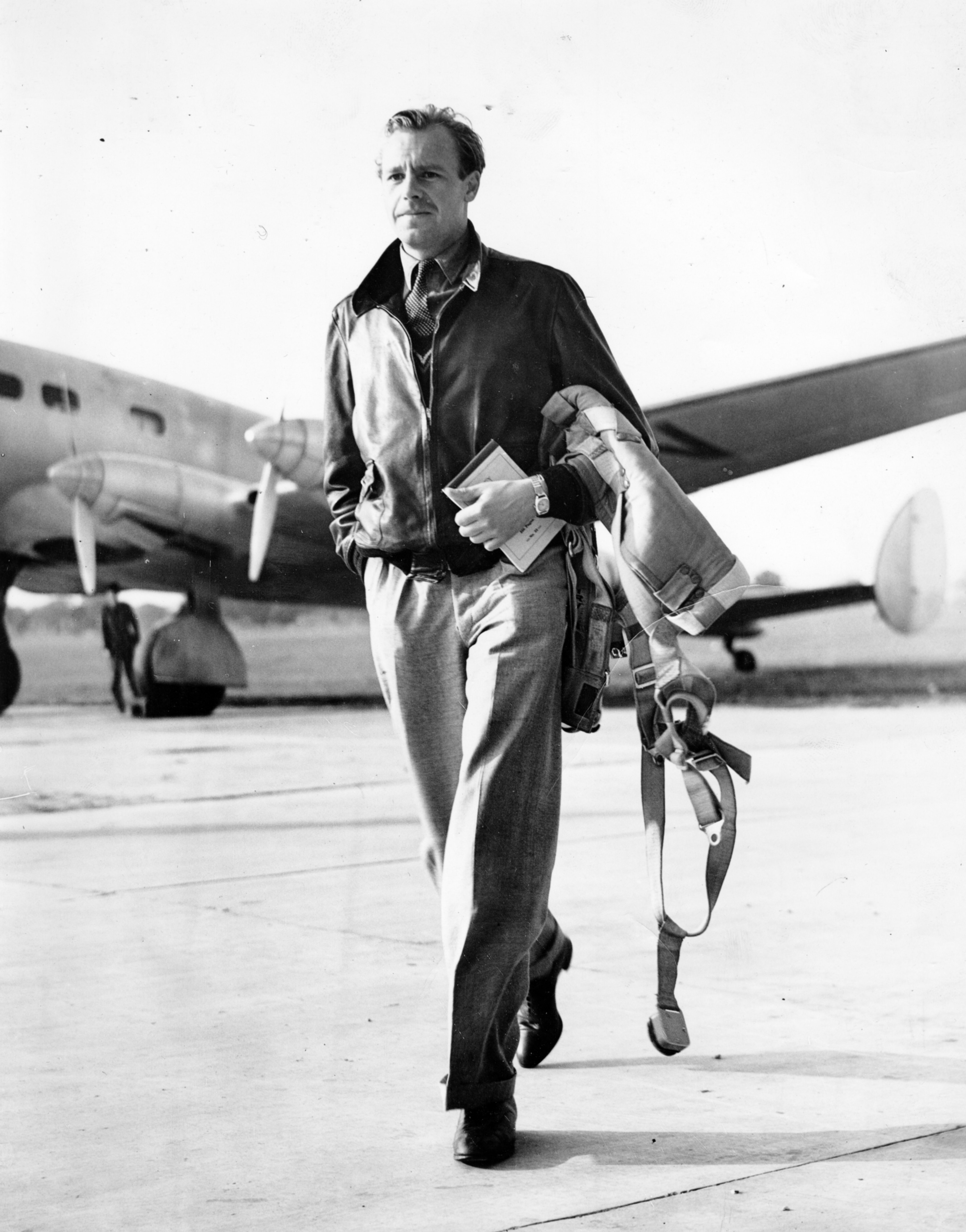
- Born: 18 February 1910; Crux Easton, Hampshire, England
- Died: 27 September 1946 (aged 36); Kent, England
- Occupation: Test pilot
- Spouses: Gwendoline Maud Alexander (m. 1933; div. 1942) Pipette Marion Scott Bruford (m. 1943)
- Relatives: Geoffrey de Havilland (father); John de Havilland (brother); Dame Olivia de Havilland (cousin); Joan Fontaine (cousin)

Geoffrey Raoul de Havilland Jr., OBE (18 February 1910 – 27 September 1946) was a British test pilot. He was the son of Geoffrey de Havilland, the English aviation pioneer and aircraft designer.

== Early life ==
Geoffrey Raoul de Havilland was born on 18 February 1910 at Crux Easton, Hampshire, the son of Sir Geoffrey de Havilland, founder of the de Havilland Aircraft Company, and his wife, Louise (1881–1949). Geoffrey was the eldest of three children, the others being Peter Jason (born in 1913) and John (born in 1918).. He first flew at the age of 8 months, carried in his mother's arms in a plane piloted by his father. At the age of 6, he was flying as a passenger with his father at Hendon in a D.H.6.

While he was at Stowe School from 1924 to 1927, his parents would visit him in a Gipsy Moth, landing in a field in the school grounds.

In 1928, he joined the de Havilland company as a premium apprentice, working in the engineering department, with his last two years spent in the drawing office. Alongside his apprenticeship, he learnt to fly at the Royal Air Force Reserve School located on de Havilland's Stag Lane aerodrome. In 1929, he took his "B" licence. When his apprenticeship ended in 1932, he left to join the Aircraft Operating Company as a pilot carrying out air survey work in South Africa. This gave him very little flying experience, and at the end of six months he returned to England and became a flying instructor, first at the de Havilland Aeronautical Technical School and later at the London Aeroplane Club, Hatfield, Hertfordshire.

== Test pilot ==
In the early 1930s, Hubert Broad was the de Havilland company's chief test pilot and Robert Waight was the production test pilot; by 1934, production was increasing rapidly and Geoffrey was given the opportunity to assist with the production test flying. Broad left the company in 1935 and Waight took his place, but he was killed in the de Havilland T.K.4 crash in October 1937, and Geoffrey de Havilland Jr. then became the company's chief test pilot at the age of 27. Waight's death plunged Geoffrey into the development trials of the Albatross. This was a considerable step for a pilot who had not till then flown a wide variety of aircraft. The design of the Albatross was advanced for the 1930s: the engines were new, its ply-balsa composite construction was new, and its layout was novel. On 22 December 1938, he undertook the maiden flight of the Flamingo, de Havilland's first all-metal stressed-skin aircraft. For the next seven years, he made the first flight, and carried out the development flying, of every de Havilland prototype, including the de Havilland Mosquito and the de Havilland Vampire.

On 11 April 1939, de Havilland and John Cunningham narrowly escaped with their lives during a test of a Moth Minor's spin response. At 8,000 feet (2,400 m), the aircraft was put into a right-hand spin; however, the engine stopped, adversely affecting airflow over the rudder and tailplane so the aircraft did not respond to de Havilland's control inputs. When the aircraft had failed to recover after five turns, both men bailed out.

When the UK entered the Second World War, de Havilland were manufacturing Oxfords and Flamingos, which Geoffrey was testing. By the height of the Battle of Britain, de Havilland were also carrying out emergency repairs on battle-damaged Hurricanes, and Dick Reynell, then a Hawker test pilot, visited de Havilland to train Geoffrey on the flight characteristics of the Hurricane. On one test flight of a repaired Hurricane, the whole canopy detached at 4,000 feet (1,200 m) and hit Geoffrey in the face; he was initially blinded, but could fly by holding his face close to the instrument panel, and he managed to land despite severely impaired vision. This incident left permanent scars across his nose. On another occasion, a Hurricane's oxygen bottle contained only compressed air, causing Geoffrey to blame its effects on him on the previous night's party.

Geoffrey made the first flight of the Mosquito prototype (E0234) on 25 November 1940 from the Hatfield aerodrome. More challenging was the first flight of the Mosquito fighter in May 1941. Like the original prototype, the aircraft had been manufactured in the dispersal factory at Salisbury Hall, but to save the six weeks that would have been spent in transporting and rebuilding the airframe at Hatfield, Geoffrey used adjacent fields as a runway by having bridges built over ditches to give him a 450-yard (410 m) run for take-off, and then flew the fighter to Hatfield.

Following an informal approach by Henry Tizard in January 1941, the de Havilland company began developing an experimental jet fighter that would later become the DH.100 Vampire. In preparation for its development flying, Geoffrey flew the Gloster E28/39. He made the first flight of the Vampire on 20 September 1943, making him the third British test pilot (after Gloster's Gerry Sayer and Michael Daunt) to conduct the maiden flight of a jet-powered aircraft.

De Havilland was awarded the OBE in the King's birthday honours in 1945.

== Death ==
De Havilland died on the evening of 27 September 1946 whilst carrying out high-speed tests in the de Havilland DH 108 TG306 which broke up over the Thames Estuary, the remains of the aircraft being discovered the following day in the mud of Egypt Bay, Gravesend, Kent. His body was found on the mud flats at Whitstable, his parachute pull ring untouched; he suffered a broken neck, the result of the aircraft having undergone severe and violent longitudinal oscillations prior to break-up, which caused de Havilland's head to strike the cockpit canopy with great force. Another pilot who flew the DH 108, Capt. Eric "Winkle" Brown, suggested that a factor in de Havilland's death was his height; Brown suffered similar oscillations during a test flight but, because of his shorter stature, they did not cause his head to contact the cockpit hood. The 1952 David Lean film The Sound Barrier refers to this event.

Geoffrey was succeeded as Chief Test Pilot by John Cunningham.

== Personal life ==
Geoffrey was a cousin of the actresses Olivia de Havilland and Joan Fontaine. In 1933, he married Gwendoline Maud Alexander. They divorced in 1942, and in 1943 he married Pipette Marion Scott Bruford. There were no children of either marriage. Geoffrey's younger brother John de Havilland was also a test pilot for de Havilland and was killed in a midair collision while flying a Mosquito in 1943.

de Havilland family tree

Alice Jeannette (née Saunders); 1854–1911	Rev. Charles de Havilland; 1854–1920	Walter de Havilland; 1872–1968	Lilian Fontaine (Ruse); 1886–1975
Ivon Molesworth Charles Jordan de Havilland; 1879–1905	Louise Thomas c. 1879–1949	Captain Sir Geoffrey de Havilland; 1882–1965	Joan Mary Frith; 1900–1974	Hereward de Havilland; 1894–1976	Marcus Goodrich; 1897–1991	Olivia Mary de Havilland; 1919–2020	Pierre Galante; 1909–1998	Joan de Beauvoir de Havilland; 1917–2013	William McElroy Dozier; 1908–1991
Peter Jason de Havilland; 1913–1977	Geoffrey de Havilland Jr. 1910–1946	John de Havilland; 1918–1943	Benjamin Goodrich; 1949–1991	Gisèle Galante; 1956–	Deborah Leslie; 1949–
