= Delilah (novel) =

1941 war novel by Martin Goodrich

First edition (publ. Farrar & Rinehart)

Delilah is a novel by Marcus Goodrich first published in 1941. It revolves around the activities of the fictional American destroyer, the USS Delilah, and her crew in and around the Philippines in the time period from 1916 to 1917. The novel is loosely based on Goodrich's own experiences as a sailor on board the USS Chauncey, a destroyer.

Much of the book constitutes detailed descriptions of various characters, punctuated by plot developments associated with the ship's mission in general support of maintaining order in the southern islands of the Filipino archipelago, populated by Muslim natives dissatisfied with the center of government in the northern island of Luzon. The relationship between the enlisted men and the officers on board the Delilah receives special treatment. This relationship can be seen as a logical link between the strict stratification of naval personnel in the age of sail and the more egalitarian navy that emerged following World War II.

The novel was an immediate success. Although the author's foreword expressly states his intention to write a sequel, and the story ends on the eve of the United States' entry into World War I following an extensive overhaul of the Delilah, no sequel was ever published.

Delilah remained the biggest success for writer Goodrich, who is perhaps better known today as the first husband of actress Olivia de Havilland.
