= George Genders =

British flying ace of WWII

- Born: 15 February 1920; Oldham, England
- Died: 1 May 1950 (aged 30); Hartley Wintney, England
- Military career
- Allegiance: United Kingdom
- Branch: Royal Air Force
- Service years: 1939–1950
- Rank: Squadron Leader
- Nickname: 'Jumbo'
- Units: No. 33 Squadron; No. 103 Maintenance Unit
- Commands: Aero Flight, RAE
- Conflicts: Second World War: Battle of Greece; Battle of Crete; Western Desert campaign
- Awards: Distinguished Flying Medal; Air Force Cross

George Genders, DFM, AFC (15 February 1920 – 1 May 1950) was a flying ace of the Royal Air Force (RAF) during the Second World War. He is credited with the destruction of at least ten aircraft. He was also a test pilot in the postwar period.

From Oldham in England, Genders joined the Royal Air Force Volunteer Reserve in 1939 and was called up to serve in the RAF on the outbreak of the Second World War. After completing his flying training, he was posted to Greece to serve with No. 33 Squadron in early 1941 as a sergeant pilot. Flying Hawker Hurricane fighters, Genders claimed several aerial victories during the fighting in Greece and later in Battle of Crete. He continued to serve with the squadron following its withdrawal to Egypt, achieving further aerial victories during its involvement in the Western Desert campaign. Commissioned in March 1942, he was awarded the Distinguished Flying Medal the next month. From May 1942 to May 1943, he served with a maintenance unit in Egypt but also flew successful high altitude interception sorties in specially modified Supermarine Spitfire fighters. Much of the remainder of his war service was in repair and maintenance units. In the postwar period, he remained with the RAF as a test pilot. He was killed on 1 May 1950 in a flying accident while testing the de Havilland DH 108 experimental supersonic jet aircraft.

== Early life ==
George Eric Clifford Genders was born in Oldham in Lancashire in England on 15 February 1920. In July 1939, by which time he was living in Doncaster, Genders joined the Royal Air Force Volunteer Reserve. Then in September he was called up for service in the Royal Air Force (RAF) following the outbreak of the Second World War.

== Second World War ==
By early 1941 Gender's flying training was complete and he was posted to No. 33 Squadron as a sergeant pilot. This unit, equipped with Hawker Hurricane fighters, was based at Eleusis in Greece and flying as escorts to bombers attacking the Italian forces along the Albanian border. Following the German invasion of Greece, the squadron began encountering the Luftwaffe. On 14 April the squadron's airfield was subject to a strafing attack by Messerschmitt Bf 109 fighters. Genders was able to take off and shoot down one of the attacking aircraft, and also damaged a second. He destroyed three Junkers Ju 87 dive bombers and another Bf 109 on 23 April. On 3 May, with the squadron now operating over Crete, Genders claimed two Junkers Ju 88 medium bombers as probably destroyed and also damaged two others.

=== Egypt ===
After its campaign on Crete, what was left of No. 33 Squadron was evacuated to Egypt to rebuild after the losses of the previous weeks. Once it was operational again it carried out defensive patrols from Heliopolis. It then flew from Sidi Barrani in support of the British efforts along the Egypt-Libya border in the Western Desert campaign. Genders destroyed two Fiat G.50 fighters of the Regia Aeronautica (Royal Italian Air Force) on 17 June. He damaged a Ju 88 on 22 November, and also shared in the destruction of a Savoia-Marchetti SM.79 medium bomber the same day. The squadron was operating from Landing Ground 125 by this time and in early 1942, it started training up on the Curtiss P-40 Kittyhawk fighter.

Genders was rested in March and was commissioned as a pilot officer. The following month he was awarded the Distinguished Flying Medal. He briefly served with No. 53 Repair and Salvage Unit before, in May, he was posted to No. 103 Maintenance Unit (MU) at Aboukir. This was tasked with repairing aircraft and Genders gained considerable experience across a wide variety of aircraft types.

The unit also prepared specially adapted Supermarine Spitfire fighters for high-altitude interception of German reconnaissance aircraft. Genders was one of three pilots tasked with flying sorties with these fighters and on 26 June he and another pilot damaged a Junkers Ju 86P reconnaissance aircraft. The next day, he again successfully intercepted a Ju 86P but was only able to share in damaging it. He shared in the destruction of a Ju 86P on 6 September. These duties were risky and on one occasion Genders ran out of fuel while pursuing a German aircraft, and had to bale out over the sea. After spending nearly a day in the water before reaching the shore, he had walk nearly 2 miles (3.2 km) before reaching the Allied positions. On 21 October he shot down a Ju 88.

In May 1943, now holding the rank of acting flight lieutenant, Genders was assigned to No. 1 British Airways Repair Unit at Heliopolis. He remained there for nearly a year until being posted to No. 136 MU at Berca in February 1944. Genders returned to the United Kingdom in April 1945 with a posting to the aircraft manufacturer Airspeed Limited at Portsmouth as a test pilot.

== Postwar service ==
Genders opted to remain in the RAF in the postwar period, and his service was extended in December. His substantive rank at this time was flying officer but he remained an acting flight lieutenant. The following month he commenced a four-month course at the Empire Test Pilots School (ETPS) at Cranfield after which he was posted to the Royal Aircraft Establishment (RAE) at Farnborough. Later in the year he returned to the ETPS for further coursework, then attended the Empire Flying School at Hullavington. Genders resumed service with the RAE in March 1947. He was granted a permanent commission in the RAF as a flight lieutenant in January 1948. In the 1949 New Year Honours, Genders was awarded the Air Force Cross. Later in the year he became a squadron leader and was appointed to Instrument Training Flight No. 103, serving with the headquarters of RAF Reserve Command.

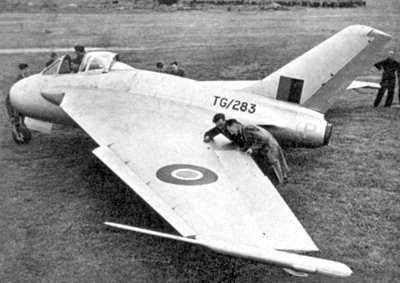
Genders was conducting an air test of TG283, the last of the de Havilland DH 108 experimental supersonic jet aircraft, when he was killed

At the start of 1950 Genders was posted to No. 3605 Fighter Command unit and then in March, upon the death of Squadron Leader Stuart Muller-Rowland, the leader of the RAE's Aero Flight, he took over command. As part of the Aero Flight, Genders was involved in the testing of the de Havilland DH 108 experimental supersonic jet plane, the first British aircraft to break the sound barrier. It was while flying one of the three examples of this aircraft that his predecessor as commander of the Aero Flight was killed. On 1 May Genders conducted a test flight of TG283, the last remaining DH 108 airframe. He deliberately stalled the aircraft at 15,000 feet as part of its scheduled test program, but it spun out of control during his attempt to recover. Genders ejected from the stricken aircraft before it crashed at Hartley Wintney but his parachute was unable to deploy in time and he was killed.

Genders is credited with shooting down ten aircraft, two being shared with other pilots. He also probably destroyed two other aircraft, and damaged five more, two of which were shared. On 1 May 2010, sixty years after his death, Genders was remembered in a wreath laying ceremony at Hartley Wintney.
