= Lilian Fontaine =

English actress (1886–1975)

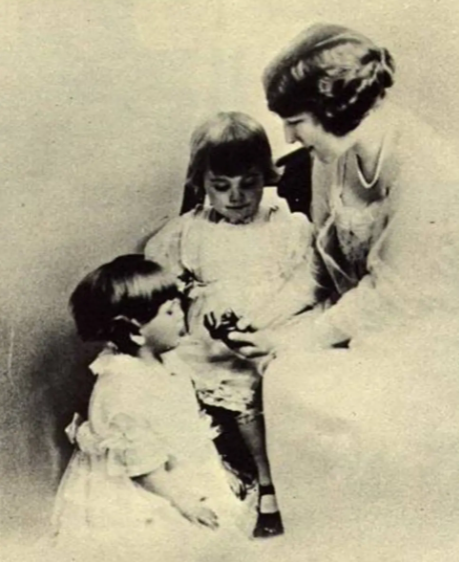
- Fontaine with her daughters, Joan and Olivia, c. 1922
- Born: Lilian Augusta Ruse; 11 June 1886; Reading, Berkshire, England
- Died: 20 February 1975 (aged 88); Santa Barbara, California, U.S.
- Education: Royal Academy of Dramatic Art
- Occupation: Actress
- Spouses: Walter de Havilland (m. 1914; div. 1925) George Milan-Fontaine (m. 1925; died 1956)
- Children: Olivia de Havilland; Joan Fontaine

Lilian Augusta Fontaine (née Ruse, formerly de Havilland; 11 June 1886 – 20 February 1975) was an English actress and mother of Olivia de Havilland and Joan Fontaine.

== Early years ==
Fontaine was born Lilian Augusta Ruse in Reading, Berkshire. She received a scholarship from Reading College at the age of 13 for her musical talent and studied acting at the Royal Academy of Dramatic Art in London.

== Career ==
Fontaine gave up her acting career when she married.

Fontaine coached drama students when she lived in Saratoga, California, and she produced plays in a garden theatre that later was named for her.

After both of her daughters reached film stardom, Fontaine returned to acting with a role in Billy Wilder's drama The Lost Weekend (1945) as the mother of Jane Wyman's character. She also played supporting roles in two films with her daughter Joan, Ivy (1947) and The Bigamist (1953) and made a few television appearances during the 1950s.

From 1948 to 1958, Fontaine taught an acting class that developed into the Los Gatos Theatre workshop.

== Personal life ==
After a stage career, Fontaine married the British patent attorney Walter de Havilland (1872–1968) in 1914. Their first daughter, Olivia, was born in 1916, followed by their second daughter, Joan, the following year. Both children were born in Tokyo where their father was a law professor and a patent attorney. After several years of marital strain, in part due to her husband's obsession with the ancient Chinese game Go, Lilian Fontaine decided to end the marriage. However, the divorce was not finalised until February 1925.

In 1922, the family moved to Saratoga, California, hoping that the climate there would improve the health of her daughters, who suffered from "recurring ailments". They lived there until 1933.

In April 1925, she married the department store manager George M. Fontaine. They remained married until his death in 1956. She lived with her two daughters in California, and encouraged them to pursue acting careers.

de Havilland family tree

Alice Jeannette (née Saunders); 1854–1911	Rev. Charles de Havilland; 1854–1920	Walter de Havilland; 1872–1968	Lilian Fontaine (Ruse); 1886–1975
Ivon Molesworth Charles Jordan de Havilland; 1879–1905	Louise Thomas c. 1879–1949	Captain Sir Geoffrey de Havilland; 1882–1965	Joan Mary Frith; 1900–1974	Hereward de Havilland; 1894–1976	Marcus Goodrich; 1897–1991	Olivia Mary de Havilland; 1916–2020	Pierre Galante; 1909–1998	Joan de Beauvoir de Havilland; 1917–2013	William McElroy Dozier; 1908–1991
Peter Jason de Havilland; 1913–1977	Geoffrey de Havilland Jr. 1910–1946	John de Havilland; 1918–1943	Benjamin Goodrich; 1949–1991	Gisèle Galante; 1956–	Deborah Leslie; 1949–

== Death ==
Fontaine died on 20 February 1975 of cancer aged 88.

== Legacy ==
The Lilian Fontaine Garden Theatre in Saratoga, California, was named in honour of the actress, as was that city's Fontaine Drive.

== Filmography ==
Year	Title	Role	Notes
1945	The Lost Weekend	Mrs. St. James	
1946	The Locket	Lady Wyndham	
1947	Suddenly, It's Spring	Mary's Mother	
1947	Time Out of Mind	Aunt Melinda	
1947	The Imperfect Lady	Mrs. Gunner	
1947	Ivy	Lady Flora	
1953	The Bigamist	Miss Higgins, Landlady	
1954	Waterfront	Helen Martin	TV series, 1 episode
1955	Studio 57	Anita Wilcox	TV series, 1 episode
1955	Schlitz Playhouse of Stars		TV series, 1 episode
1956	Passport to Danger		TV series, 1 episode
1957	Hawkeye and the Last of the Mohicans	Marian	TV series, 1 episode
