= De Havilland DH 108 =

1945 British experimental aircraft

DH 108 "Swallow"
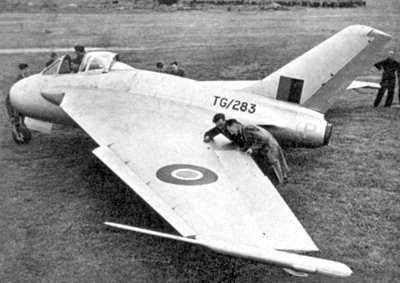
- The first DH 108 built – TG283. The torpedo-shaped objects on the wingtips are containers for anti-spin parachutes.

General information
- Type: experimental
- Manufacturer: de Havilland
- Designer: John Frost
- Status: Cancelled
- Primary user: Royal Aircraft Establishment
- Number built: 3

History
- Manufactured: 1946–1947
- Introduction date: Experimental programme only
- First flight: 15 May 1946

The de Havilland DH 108 "Swallow" was a British experimental aircraft designed by John Carver Meadows Frost in October 1945. The DH 108 featured a tailless, swept wing with a single vertical stabilizer. Initially designed to evaluate swept wing handling characteristics at low and high subsonic speeds for the proposed early tailless design of the Comet airliner, three examples of the DH 108 were built to Air Ministry specifications E.18/45. With the adoption of a conventional tail for the Comet, the aircraft were used instead to investigate swept wing handling up to supersonic speeds. All three prototypes were lost in fatal crashes.

== Design and development ==
Employing the main fuselage section and engine of the de Havilland Vampire mated to a longer fuselage with a single fin and swept wings, the de Havilland DH 108 was proposed in 1944 as an aerodynamic test bed for tailless designs, particularly the DH.106 Comet which had initially been considered a tailless, swept-wing concept. Despite the Comet design taking on more conventional features, the value of testing the unique configuration to provide basic data for the DH.110 spurred de Havilland to continue development of the DH 108. Selecting two airframes from the English Electric Vampire F 1 production line, the new aircraft had unmistakable similarities to its fighter origins, especially in the original forward fuselage which retained the nose, cockpit and other components of the Vampire. The Ministry of Supply named the DH 108 the "Swallow", a name that was never officially adopted by the company.

The new metal wing incorporating a 43˚ sweepback was approximately 15% greater in area than the standard Vampire wing. Control was based on the conventional rudder in combination with elevons that were part elevator and ailerons, fitted outboard of the split trailing edge flaps. Although the Vampire fuselage was retained, as development continued, a revised nose and streamlined, reinforced canopy were incorporated.

== Testing ==
The first DH 108 prototype, serial number TG283, had a 43° swept wing, flew on 15 May 1946 at RAF Woodbridge. Designed to investigate low-speed handling, it was capable of only 280 mph (450 km/h). The de Havilland chief test pilot Geoffrey de Havilland Jr., son of de Havilland company owner-designer Geoffrey de Havilland, gave a display flight in the DH 108 during the 1946 Society of British Aircraft Constructors (SBAC) airshow at Radlett. In later low-speed testing designed to clear the rear fuselage at high angles of attack, the first prototype was fitted with longer Sea Vampire landing gear.

The second, high-speed, prototype, TG306, which had a 45° swept wing incorporating automatic leading-edge Handley Page slats and was powered by a de Havilland Goblin 3 turbojet, flew soon afterwards, in June 1946. Modifications to the design included a longer more streamlined nose and a smaller canopy (framed by a strengthened metal fairing) facilitated by lowering the pilot's seat. While being used to evaluate handling characteristics at high speed in preparation for an attempt on the World Speed Record, on 27 September 1946 TG306 suffered a catastrophic structural failure which occurred in a dive from 10,000 ft (3,000 m) at Mach 0.9 and crashed in the Thames Estuary. The pilot, Geoffrey de Havilland Jr., was killed in the accident. Early wind tunnel testing had pointed to potentially dangerous flight behaviour, but pitch oscillation at high speed had been unexpected. The subsequent accident investigation centred on a structural failure which occurred as air built up at Mach 0.9, pitching the aircraft into a shock stall that placed tremendous loads on the fuselage and wings. The main spar cracked at the roots causing the wings to immediately fold backwards.

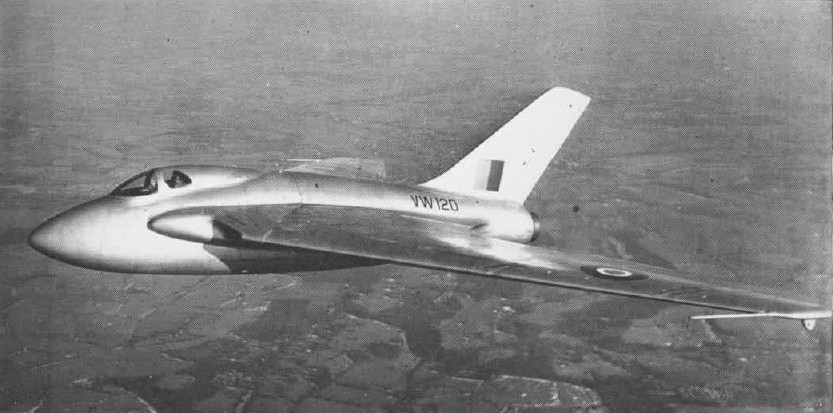
VW120 in flight, about 1949

After the loss of the second prototype, a third aircraft was ordered to continue high-speed trials. VW120 became the third and final prototype. It differed from the first test aircraft in having a more streamlined pointed nose and smaller reinforced canopy (lowering the pilot's seat allowed for a more aerodynamic canopy shape to be employed), with the cockpit redesign allowing an ejection seat to be fitted. Power-boosted elevators had been specified as a means to control the pitch oscillations at the root of the earlier disaster. A more powerful Goblin 4 of 3,738 lbf (16.67 kN) thrust had the potential to push the DH 108 into the supersonic range. VW120 first flew on 24 July 1947 flown by John Cunningham, the wartime nightfighter ace who became, in 1949, the first person to pilot the de Havilland Comet jet airliner.

Considered an important testbed for high-speed flight, VW120 was readied for an attempt at the World Speed Record then held by a Gloster Meteor at 616 mph (991 km/h). The second prototype, TG306, was a backup for the attempt before it crashed. On 12 April 1948, VW120 established a new World Air Speed Record of 604.98 mph (974.02 km/h) on a 62-mile (100 km) circuit. Then, on 6 September 1948, John Derry is thought to have probably exceeded the speed of sound in a shallow dive from 40,000 ft (12,195 m) to 30,000 ft (9,145 m). The test pilot Captain Eric "Winkle" Brown, who escaped a crash in 1949, described the DH 108 as "a killer".

In 1949, VW120 put on an aerial display at Farnborough and was placed third in the Society of British Aircraft Constructors Challenge Trophy Air Race before being turned over to the Ministry of Supply and test flown at RAE Farnborough. It was destroyed on 15 February 1950 in a crash near Brickhill, Buckinghamshire, killing its test pilot, Squadron Leader Stuart Muller-Rowland. The accident investigation at the time pointed, not to the aircraft, but to a faulty oxygen system that incapacitated the pilot. This theory was subsequently ruled out by the coroner in his report which confirmed that the pilot died from a broken neck.

The failure of the left wing as the plane dived occurred just above the garage at Brickhill. This failure was presumed to be the source of a "bang" described by witnesses at Brickhill. Swishing sounds which were reported came from the aircraft spinning at a high rate due to it having only one wing. It came down in the woods, after glancing off an oak tree: traces of the impact were still visible 50 years later. The airframe and right wing were dismantled by the military, and removed very quickly. The left wing was also recovered from the fields just north of Brickhill.

A nearby German field worker ran over to the crash site and was met by the mechanic from Brickhill garage who had rushed to the crash site in his car to offer assistance. The pilot was already dead.

In 2001, a search at the crash site by a local using a metal detector was successful. He found some of the mounting bolts "cone shaped" that were removed when the remains had been dismantled on-site. The tree that the DH 108 had hit was also found, with the scar still visible.

Finally, on 1 May 1950, during low-speed sideslip and stall tests, the first prototype, TG283, was lost in a crash at Hartley Wintney killing the pilot, Sqn Ldr George Genders AFC DFM. After abandoning the aircraft at low altitude in an inverted spin, his parachute failed to open in time. In all, 480 flights had been made by the three Swallows.

== Legacy ==
The DH108 established a number of "firsts" for a British aircraft: it was the first British swept-winged jet aircraft and the first British tailless jet aircraft.

== Operators ==
United Kingdom

- Royal Aircraft Establishment

== Specifications (DH 108 VW120: third prototype) ==
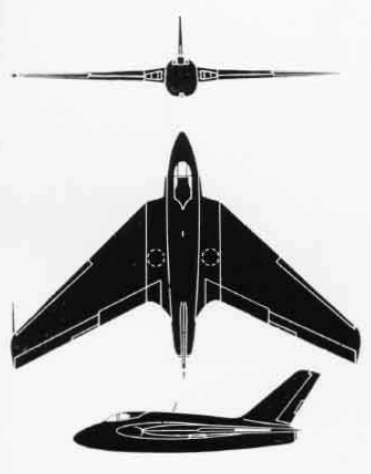
De Havilland DH.108 Swallow

General characteristics

- Length: 29 ft 9.5 in (9.081 m)
- Wingspan: 39 ft (12 m)
- Wing area: 327.86 sq ft (30.459 m^{2})
- Empty weight: 8,940 lb (4,055 kg)
- Powerplant: 1 × de Havilland Goblin 4 centrifugal compressor jet engine, 3,738 lbf (16.63 kN) thrust

Performance

- Maximum speed: 677 mph (1,090 km/h, 588 kn)
- Range: 730 mi (1,170 km, 630 nmi)
- Service ceiling: 35,425 ft (10,798 m)
- Wing loading: 27 lb/sq ft (130 kg/m^{2})
- Thrust/weight: 0.42

== See also ==
Related development

- de Havilland Vampire

Aircraft of comparable role, configuration, and era

- Messerschmitt Me 163 Komet
- Northrop X-4 Bantam
