= Hereward de Havilland =

English aviator (1894–1976)

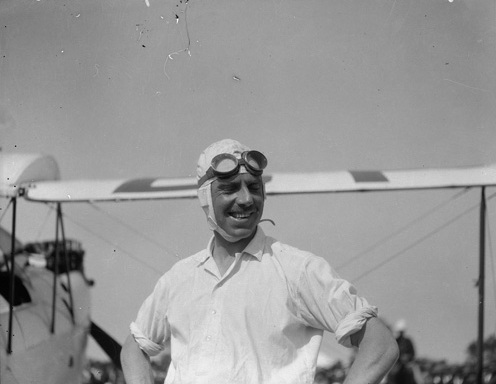
- De Havilland in 1929
- Born: 2 December 1894; Nuneaton, Warwickshire, England
- Died: 12 September 1976 (aged 81); Australia
- Occupation: Aviator
- Relatives: Geoffrey de Havilland (brother); Joan Fontaine (cousin); Olivia de Havilland (cousin)

Hereward de Havilland (2 December 1894 – 12 September 1976) was a pioneer British aviator, test pilot and member of the de Havilland company.

== Early and family life ==
One of the three sons of Rev. Charles de Havilland, he was the younger brother of Geoffrey de Havilland. Actresses Olivia de Havilland and Joan Fontaine were his cousins. He had one son, Peter de Havilland, whose career was in de Havilland's until it was taken over by Hawker Siddeley Aviation. He died on 27 March 1999, leaving a son, John de Havilland, who also had his career in British Aerospace, and daughter, Joanna de Havilland.

Hereward and his brothers, Geoffrey and Ivon, had a mechanical workshop at their home at the rectory in Crux Easton near Newbury. Geoffrey's first flight took place with Frank Hearle and Hereward in 1909 at Seven Barrows in Dorset. They practised at their grandfather's farm, Medley Manor, near Port Meadow outside Oxford. Geoffrey was the designer and his brother Hereward was the test pilot.

== Career ==
De Havilland flew in various air campaigns in Europe and the Middle East during World War I and reached the rank of Major. On 10 March 1917, he was awarded a DSO for distinguished service in the field in Mesopotamia, the youngest airman at that time to receive the DSO. He was awarded a bar to his DSO later that same year.

In 1921, along with a journalist from El Liberal, he was one of the first civilians to witness the consequences of the Annual disaster, from the air, during the Rif War. In March 1927, he established de Havilland Australia, the first overseas subsidiary of the de Havilland company.

He flew solo in the 1929 Western Australian Centenary Air Race in a modified de Havilland DH.60 Moth, named "Black Hawk", coming second on handicap and winning the £300 fastest overall time prize in 22 hours 50 minutes 23 seconds and averaging 107.8 miles per hour (173.5 km/h). The same year he joined the board of Airspeed Ltd. at Christchurch Airfield in Hampshire and was appointed Joint managing director.

He went on to manage and develop the de Havilland company in various other parts of the world including South America. He retired as managing director of de Havilland's Airspeed Division in 1959, joined the board and became Deputy chairman.

de Havilland family tree

Alice Jeannette (née Saunders); 1854–1911	Rev. Charles de Havilland; 1854–1920	Walter de Havilland; 1872–1968	Lilian Fontaine (Ruse); 1886–1975
Ivon Molesworth Charles Jordan de Havilland; 1879–1905	Louie Thomas c. 1879–1949	Captain Sir Geoffrey de Havilland; 1882–1965	Joan Mary Frith; 1900–1974	Hereward de Havilland; 1894–1976	Marcus Goodrich; 1897–1991	Olivia Mary de Havilland; 1916–2020	Pierre Galante; 1909–1998	Joan de Beauvoir de Havilland; 1917–2013	William McElroy Dozier; 1908–1991
son	Geoffrey de Havilland Jr. 1910–1946	John de Havilland; 1918–1943	son	daughter	daughter
