= Walter de Havilland =

English patent attorney (1872–1968)

- De Havilland c. 1917
- Born: Walter Augustus de Havilland; 31 August 1872; Lewisham, London, England
- Died: 20 May 1968 (aged 95); North Vancouver, British Columbia, Canada
- Occupation: Patent attorney
- Known for: Go
- Spouses: Lilian Fontaine (m. 1914; div. 1925) Yuki Matsukura (m. 1927; died 1958) Rosemary Connor (m. 1960)
- Children: Olivia de Havilland; Joan Fontaine
- Relatives: Geoffrey de Havilland (half-nephew); Hereward de Havilland (half-nephew)

Walter Augustus de Havilland (31 August 1872 – 20 May 1968) was an English patent attorney who became professor of Law at Waseda University and was one of the first Westerners to play the ancient Chinese game Go at a high level. He was the father of film stars Olivia de Havilland and Joan Fontaine.

== Early life and career ==
De Havilland was born in Lewisham, south London on 31 August 1872, the youngest of eight children. He was the fourth son of the Reverend Charles Richard de Havilland (1823–1901), of a landed gentry family of Guernsey origin, and his second wife Margaret Letitia (1831–1910), daughter of Captain John Molesworth, R.N. and sister of the 8th Viscount Molesworth.

He was a pupil at Harrow and Elizabeth College, Guernsey and subsequently studied Theology and Classics at Cambridge University from 1890 to 1893, residing at Ayerst Hostel, graduating B.A. in 1893 (M.A. 1902). After graduation, he worked as a patent attorney, becoming a member of the Chartered Institute of Patent Attorneys, and moved to Japan to study patent law there. Whilst in Japan he became a university lecturer, first teaching English and football at the former Fourth High School (the fourth old-education-system high school, which was the predecessor of Kanazawa University), Tokyo Higher Normal School (which was the predecessor of Tsukuba University), and later becoming a professor of Law at Waseda University. He also ran a law firm in Tokyo, specialising in patent law.

== Go ==
Whilst in Japan, de Havilland discovered the game of Go and became quite obsessed with it. Although not the first Westerner to take up the game, he was, according to writer John Fairbairn, the first with a reasonably high level of skill in the game. His teacher was Yoshida Toshio; a game between the two of them from 1908 was considered good enough for publication in the magazine Gokai Shinpo, with commentary from Iwata Kei (later President of the Hoensha). In 1910, de Havilland published a short work entitled The ABC of Go; the National War-Game of Japan, which brought him minor celebrity in the Go-playing world.

== Family ==
With his first wife, Lilian Augusta de Havilland Fontaine, De Havilland was the father of actresses Olivia de Havilland and Joan Fontaine, both of whom were born in Tokyo while he resided there. In 1919 she took both girls to live in California. His wife and children reportedly took second place to his love of Go, and his obsession with the game affected his ability to engage fully with his family.

After Lilian divorced him in 1925, he remarried twice; first to Yuki Matsukura (previously his housemaid) and later to Rosemary Beaton Connor. In 1931, his daughter Joan, then thirteen years old, went to Japan to live with him but returned several years later to the United States.

The brothers Geoffrey and Hereward de Havilland, of aviation fame, were his nephews.

de Havilland family tree

Alice Jeannette (née Saunders); 1854–1911	Rev. Charles de Havilland; 1854–1920	Walter de Havilland; 1872–1968	Lilian Fontaine (Ruse); 1886–1975
Ivon Molesworth Charles Jordan de Havilland; 1879–1905	Louise Thomas c. 1879–1949	Captain Sir Geoffrey de Havilland; 1882–1965	Joan Mary Frith; 1900–1974	Hereward de Havilland; 1894–1976	Marcus Goodrich; 1897–1991	Olivia Mary de Havilland; 1916–2020	Pierre Galante; 1909–1998	Joan de Beauvoir de Havilland; 1917–2013	William McElroy Dozier; 1908–1991
Peter Jason de Havilland; 1913–1977	Geoffrey de Havilland Jr. 1910–1946	John de Havilland; 1918–1943	Benjamin Goodrich; 1949–1991	Gisèle Galante; 1956–	Deborah Leslie; 1949–

== Later life ==
In later life de Havilland retired in British Columbia. He died on 20 May 1968, aged 95.
