= Geoffrey de Havilland =

English aircraft engineer (1882–1965)

Sir Geoffrey de Havilland OM CBE AFC RDI FRAeS
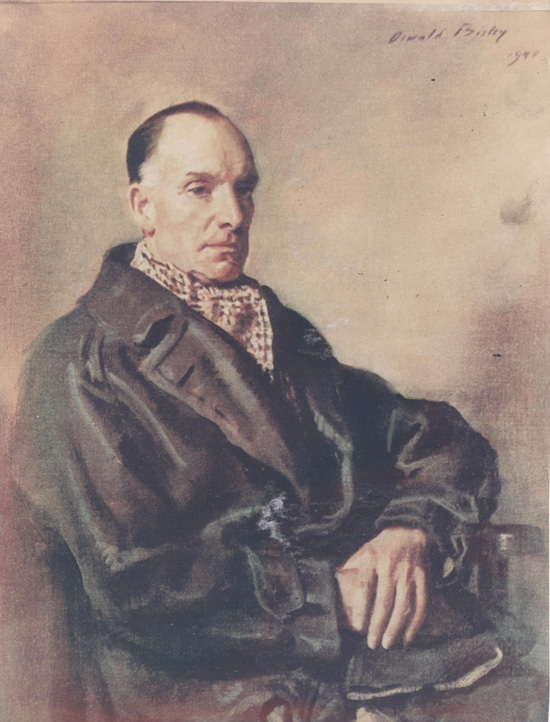
- Painting of de Havilland
- Born: 27 July 1882; High Wycombe, Buckinghamshire, England
- Died: 21 May 1965 (aged 82); Watford, Hertfordshire, England
- Education: Crystal Palace School of Engineering
- Occupation: Aircraft engineer
- Spouses: Louie Thomas (m. 1909; died 1949) Joan Mary Frith (m. 1951)
- Children: 3 sons, including Geoffrey Jr. and John
- Relatives: Hereward de Havilland (brother); Dame Olivia de Havilland (cousin); Joan Fontaine (cousin)
- Military career
- Allegiance: United Kingdom
- Branch: British Army
- Service years: 1912–1919
- Rank: Captain
- Unit: Royal Flying Corps
- Conflicts: First World War
- Awards: Air Force Cross (AFC); Officer of the Order of the British Empire (OBE)

Sir Geoffrey de Havilland, OM, CBE, AFC, RDI, FRAeS (27 July 1882 – 21 May 1965) was an English aviation pioneer and aerospace engineer who founded the aircraft company de Havilland. The company produced the Mosquito, which has been considered the most versatile warplane ever built, and his Comet was the first jet airliner to go into production.

== Early life ==
Born at Magdala House, Terriers, High Wycombe, Buckinghamshire, de Havilland was the second son of The Reverend Charles de Havilland (1854–1920) and his first wife, Alice Jeannette (née Saunders; 1854–1911). He was educated at Nuneaton Grammar School, St Edward's School, Oxford and the Crystal Palace School of Engineering (from 1900 to 1903).

Upon graduating from engineering training, de Havilland pursued a career in automotive engineering, building cars and motorcycles. He took an apprenticeship with engine manufacturers Willans & Robinson of Rugby, after which he worked as a draughtsman for The Wolseley Tool and Motor Car Company Limited in Birmingham, a job from which he resigned after a year. He then spent two years working in the design office of Motor Omnibus Construction Company Limited in Walthamstow. While there he designed his first aero engine and had the first prototype made by Iris Motor Company of Willesden.

He married in 1909 and almost immediately embarked on the career of designing, building and flying aircraft to which he devoted the rest of his life.

== Aviation career ==
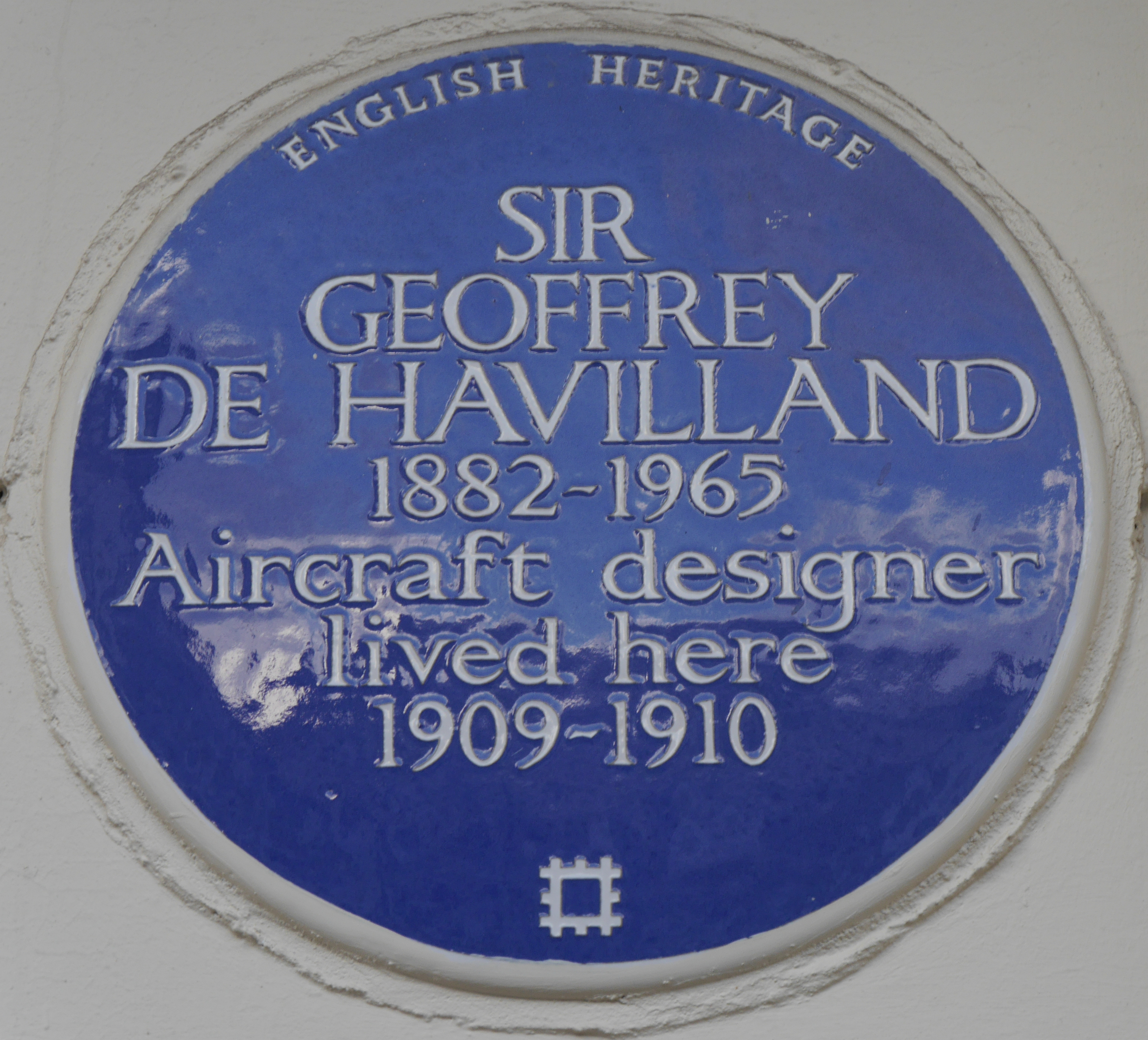
Blue plaque, 32 Baron's Court Road, Barons Court, London

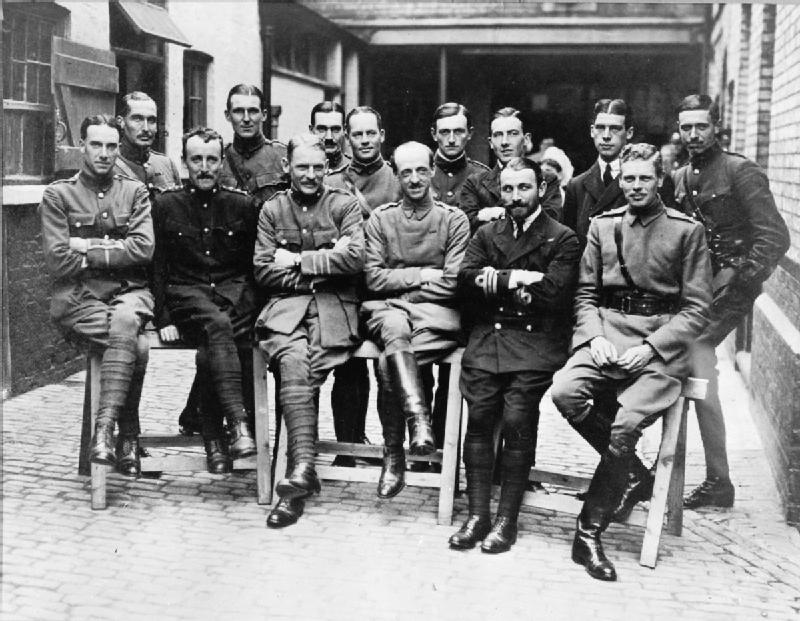
de Havilland (far left), with fellow officers of the RFC c1913

Built with money borrowed from his maternal grandfather, de Havilland's first aircraft took two years to complete. Unfortunately, he crashed it during its first very short flight at Seven Barrows near Litchfield, Hampshire in December 1909. He built a fresh biplane, making his first flight in it from a meadow near Newbury in September 1910. A memorial plaque presently marks the event. Subsequent designs were even more successful: in 1912 he established a new British altitude record of 10,500 feet (3,200 m) in an aircraft of his design, the B.E.2. Geoffrey was the designer and his brother Hereward was the test pilot.

In December 1910, de Havilland joined HM Balloon Factory at Farnborough, which was to become the Royal Aircraft Factory. He sold his second aeroplane (which he had used to teach himself to fly) to his new employer for £400. It became the F.E.1, the first aircraft to bear an official Royal Aircraft Factory designation. For the next three years, de Havilland designed, or participated in the design of, a number of experimental types at the "Factory". He was commissioned a second lieutenant (on probation) in the Royal Flying Corps on 2 September 1912, was appointed a reserve officer in the RFC on 24 November and was confirmed in his rank on 25 December.

In December 1913, de Havilland was appointed an inspector of aircraft for the Aeronautical Inspection Directorate. Unhappy at leaving design work, in May 1914 he was recruited to become the chief designer at Airco, in Hendon. He designed many aircraft for Airco, all designated by his initials, DH. Large numbers of de Havilland-designed aircraft were used during the First World War, flown by the Royal Flying Corps/Royal Air Force. De Havilland continued to serve in the RFC during the war.

On 5 August 1914, he was promoted to lieutenant and appointed a flying officer in the RFC from the same date. He was briefly stationed in Montrose on the east coast of Scotland as an officer on war duty. Flying a Blériot, he was to protect British shipping from German U-boats. After a few weeks, he was released from this duty and returned to Airco. However, he nominally remained in the service until the end of the war. On 30 April 1916, he was promoted to captain and appointed a flight commander.

His employer, Airco, was bought in early 1920 by armaments group Birmingham Small Arms Company but discovering it was less than worthless BSA shut down Airco in July 1920. With the help of former Airco owner George Holt Thomas he formed de Havilland Aircraft Company employing some former colleagues. Pleased and impressed by the aircraft they built for him, Alan Butler, thereafter company chairman, provided the capital to buy premises and then the airfield at Stag Lane Aerodrome, Edgware, where he and his colleagues designed and built a large number of aircraft, including the Moth family. One of his roles was as a test pilot for the company's aircraft.

In 1928, the subsidiary company De Havilland Canada was created to build Moth aircraft in North America. When World War II arrived, production expanded to augment British aircraft factories, without any possible threat from enemy bombers. After the Second World War, De Havilland Canada went on to design and produce a number of indigenous types, some of which proved highly successful.

In 1933, the company moved to Hatfield Aerodrome in Hertfordshire.

In 1944, he bought out his friend and engine designer Frank Halfords's consultancy firm, forming the de Havilland Engine Company with Halford as the head. Halford had previously designed a number of engines for de Havilland, including the de Havilland Gipsy and de Havilland Gipsy Major. Halford's first gas turbine design entered production as the de Havilland Goblin powering de Havilland's first jet, the Vampire.

De Havilland controlled the company until it was bought by the Hawker Siddeley Company in 1960. His financial backer, Alan Butler, remained a very involved chairman until he retired in 1950.

== Retirement and death ==
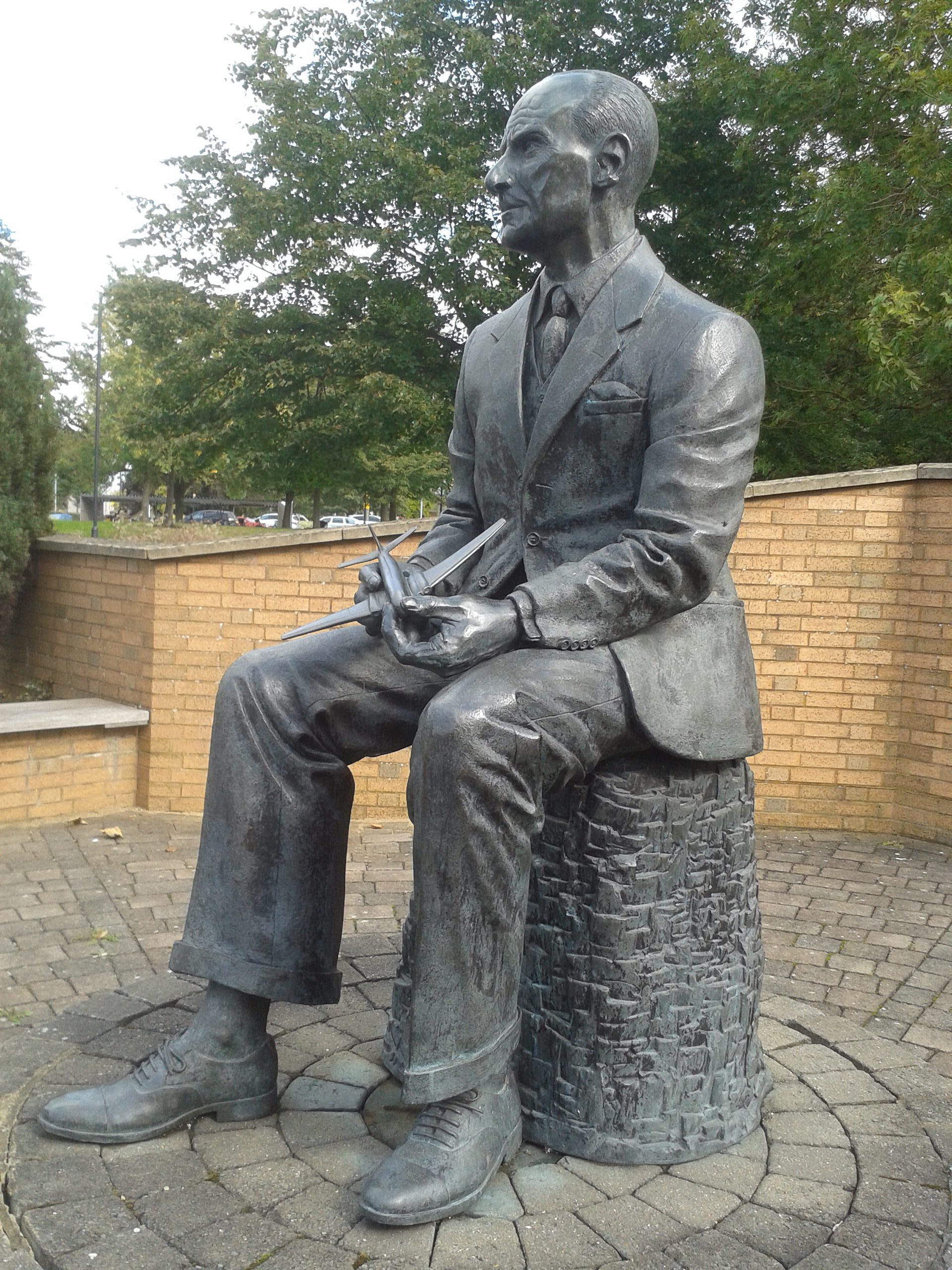
Statue at the University of Hertfordshire, Hatfield

He lived at 'Longcote' on Tanglewood Close in Stanmore.

De Havilland retired from active involvement in his company in 1955, though remaining as president. He continued flying up to the age of 70 making his final flight in a DH85 Leopard Moth, G-ACMA. He died aged 82, of a cerebral haemorrhage, on 21 May 1965 at Watford Peace Memorial Hospital, Hertfordshire.

== Honours ==
De Havilland was made an OBE (Military Division) in the 1918 Birthday Honours, and was honoured with a CBE (Civil Division) in the 1934 Birthday Honours. He was decorated with the Air Force Cross (AFC) in the 1919 New Year Honours, in recognition of his service in the First World War. He was knighted in the 1944 New Year Honours, and was invested with his knighthood by George VI at Buckingham Palace on 15 February 1944. He was appointed to the Order of Merit (OM) in November 1962. He received numerous national and international gold and silver medals and honorary fellowships of learned and engineering societies, including the Gold Medal of the Royal Aero Club in 1947 and again in 1963.

In 1972 de Havilland was inducted into the International Air & Space Hall of Fame.

A statue of de Havilland was erected in July 1997 near the entrance to the College Lane campus of the University of Hertfordshire in Hatfield. He was a benefactor of the university, having given land adjoining the A1 to Hertfordshire County Council in 1951 for its precursor, the Hatfield Technical College. The statue was unveiled by the Duke of Edinburgh. The De Havilland campus (also known as De Hav) at the university was also named in his honour.

== Family ==
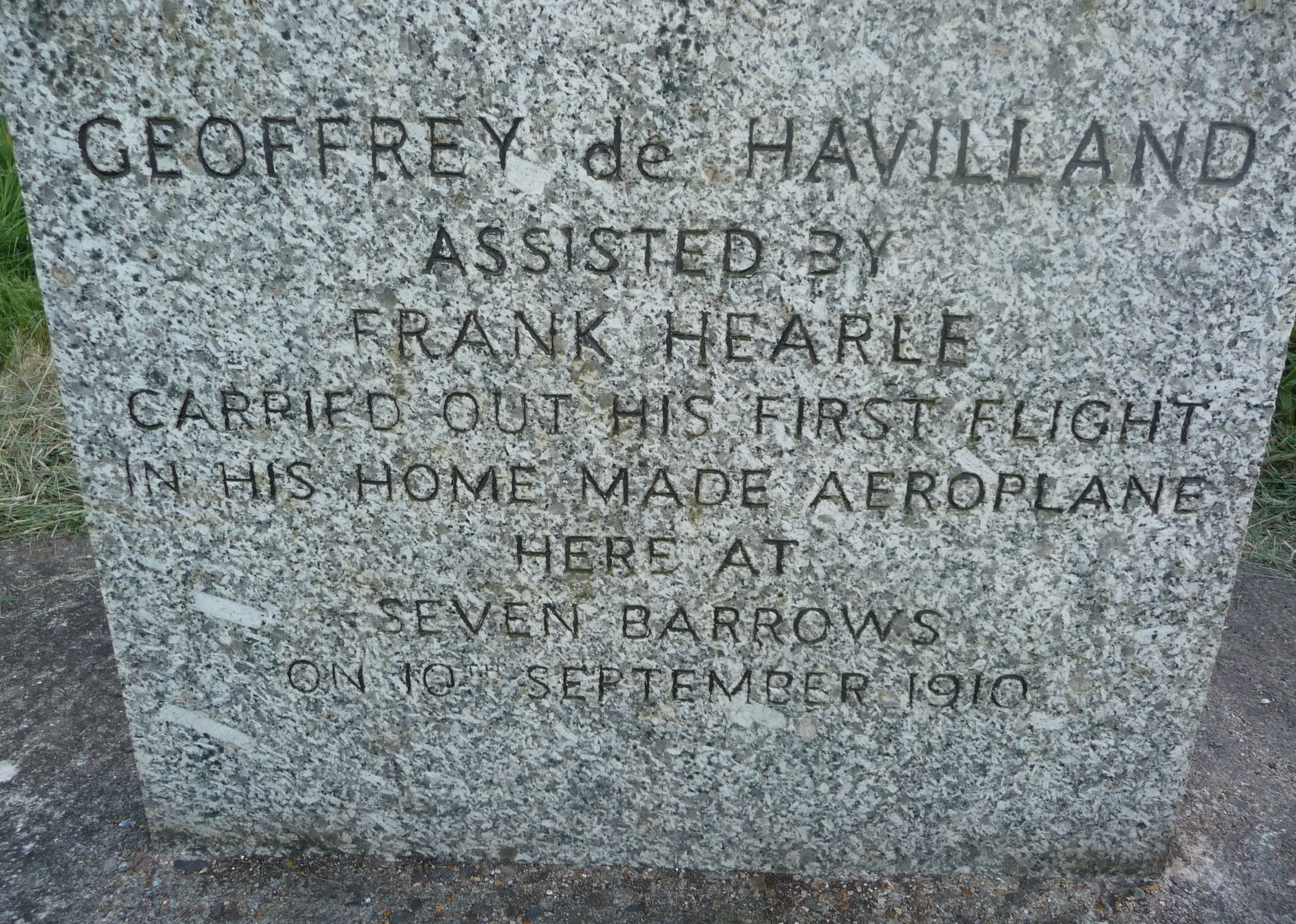
De Havilland Memorial Stone near Seven Barrows Field and Beacon Hill from A34

The actresses Olivia de Havilland and Joan Fontaine were de Havilland's first cousins; his father, Charles, and their father, Walter, were half-brothers. His younger brother, Hereward de Havilland, was also a noted pioneer aviator and test pilot.

In 1909, Geoffrey de Havilland married Louie Thomas (born c. 1879), who had formerly been governess to de Havilland's sisters. They had three sons, Peter, Geoffrey and John. Two of the sons died as test pilots in de Havilland aircraft. His youngest son, John, died in an air collision involving two Mosquitoes in the vicinity of St Albans in 1943.

Geoffrey Jr carried out the first flights of the Mosquito and Vampire and was killed in 1946 flying the jet-powered DH 108 Swallow while diving at or near the speed of sound. Louie suffered a nervous breakdown following these deaths and died in 1949. De Havilland remarried in 1951, to Joan Mary Frith (1900–1974). They remained married until his death.

de Havilland family tree

Alice Jeannette (née Saunders); 1854–1911	Rev. Charles de Havilland; 1854–1920	Walter de Havilland; 1872–1968	Lilian Fontaine (Ruse); 1886–1975
Ivon Molesworth Charles Jordan de Havilland; 1879–1905	Louie Thomas c. 1879–1949	Captain Sir Geoffrey de Havilland; 1882–1965	Joan Mary Frith; 1900–1974	Hereward de Havilland; 1894–1976	Marcus Goodrich; 1897–1991	Olivia Mary de Havilland; 1916–2020	Pierre Galante; 1909–1998	Joan de Beauvoir de Havilland; 1917–2013	William McElroy Dozier; 1908–1991
Peter Jason de Havilland; 1913–1977	Geoffrey de Havilland Jr. 1910–1946	John de Havilland; 1918–1943	Benjamin Goodrich; 1949–1991	Gisèle Galante; 1956–	Deborah Leslie; 1949–

== Posthumous publication ==
In 1975, de Havilland's 1961 autobiography, Sky Fever, was republished by Peter and Anne de Havilland. It was originally published by Hamish Hamilton.

== See also ==
- de Havilland Aircraft Museum, London Colney, Hertfordshire
