= Haviland H. Lund =

American activist (1871–1940)

Haviland Haines Lund
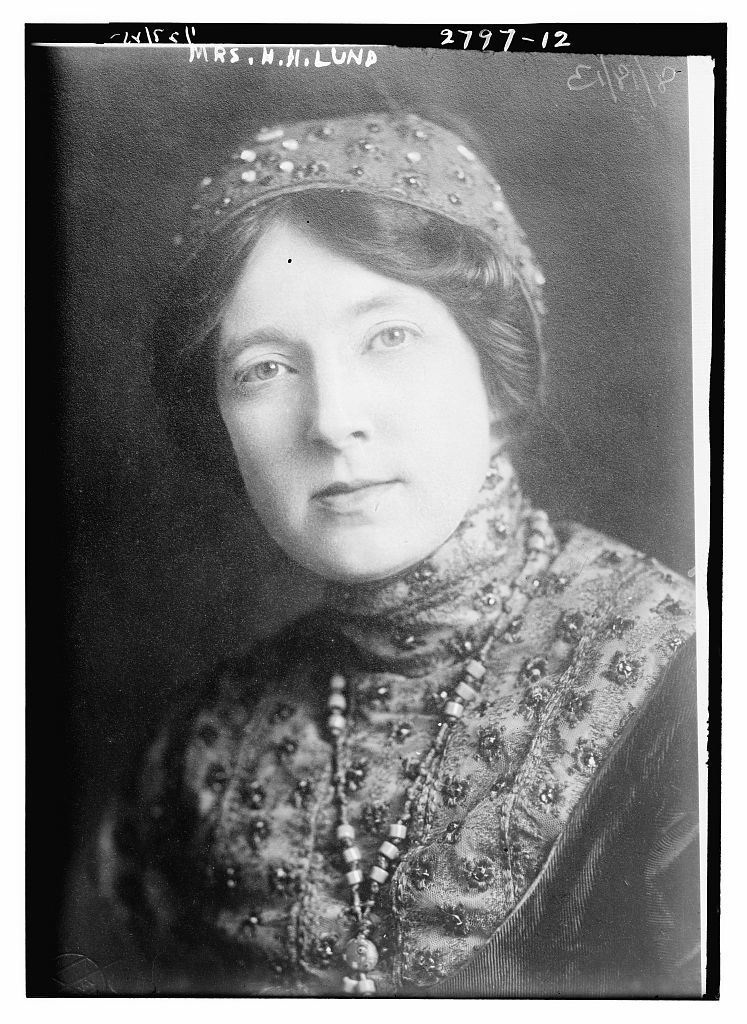
- Born: Haviland Haines; December 25, 1871; Adrian, Michigan
- Died: 1952 (aged 80–81)

Haviland Haines Lund (December 25, 1871 – 1952) was the head of the Forward-to-the-Land League which advocated for unemployed city men in America to go to rural areas and become farmers. She was vice president and editorial director of Little Farms Magazine. She was president of the Institute of Government. She was the inspector of home settlement projects for the United States Department of the Interior.

== Biography ==
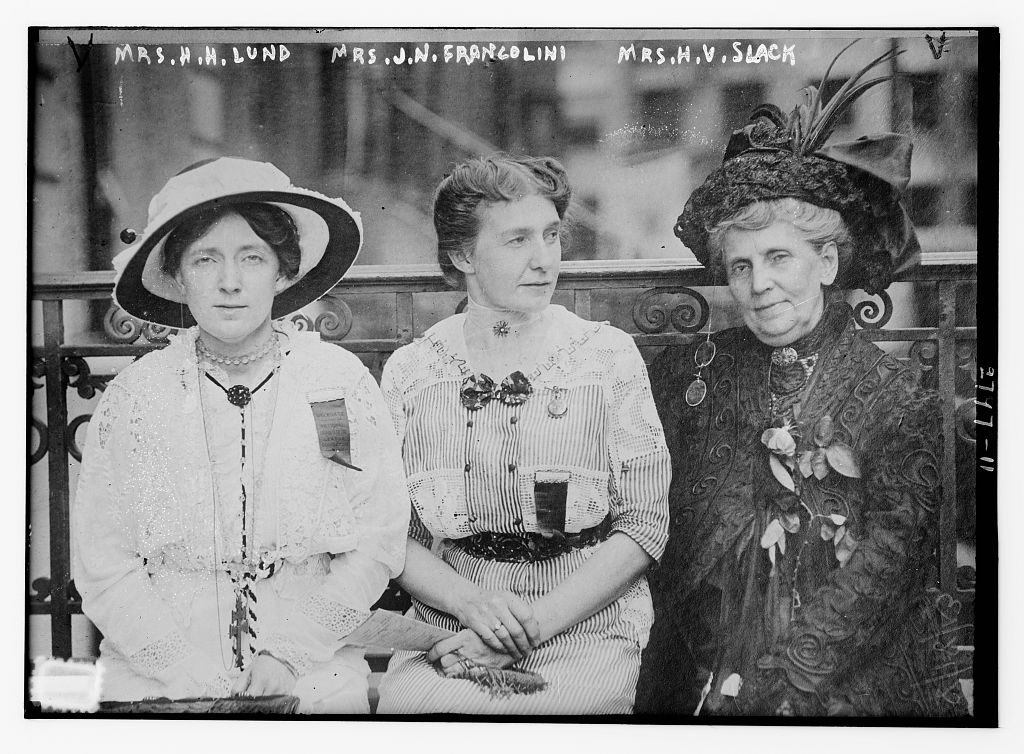
Lund with two associates

She was born on December 25, 1871, in Adrian, Michigan, as Haviland Haines. She married Adolph Lund (?-1905) of Denmark. He died in 1905 in Chicago, Illinois. By 1910, she was living in Pasadena, California. In California, she was involved in efforts to create sanatoriums for patients with tuberculosis. These projects were short-lived. Lund later lived in New York City and Washington D.C. She was a member of the Republican National Committee. She also belonged to the National Council on Women, but felt the leadership was too left-wing. She opposed the League of Nations and a proposed World Court. She belonged to the American Guardian Society. In the early 1920s, she worked to resettle World War I veterans. She also often gave public lectures on the film industry while she served as president of the Institute of Government. She worked as an investigator for the Department of Labor during the administration of Herbert Hoover. She later worked as a freelance writer. She died in 1952 at the age of 80 and was survived by her daughter.
