= Haviland Smith =

American CIA station chief (1929–2024)

Haviland Smith (August 25, 1929 – June 20, 2024) was an American CIA official.

As a station chief he worked in Prague, Berlin, Langley, Beirut, and Tehran, primarily on issues related to the Soviet Union. He also served as chief of the counterterrorism staff at the CIA, where he kept tabs on the Red Army Faction and Red Brigades, and as executive assistant to the Deputy Director of the Central Intelligence Agency Frank Carlucci.

== Early life and education ==
Smith was born in Manhattan, New York City to Charlotte Adams and Haviland Smith in 1929 but grew up in Ridgewood, New Jersey. Smith attended the Phillips Exeter Academy graduating in 1947 and thereafter attended Dartmouth College until 1951 where he studied English and Russian. After army service in Europe, he studied a graduate program in Russian at the University of London. He served in the U.S. Army at the United States Army Security Agency, intercepting Russian communications, before joining the CIA in 1956.

== CIA career ==
In 1958, he was posted to Czechoslovakia, where he was the CIA's station chief in Prague. There he helped break radio codes used Czech security police. He would later be stationed in Berlin. After Berlin, he would spend five years in the Middle East. In the 1970s, served as chief of the counterterrorism staff at the CIA for three years. Smith served as an executive assistant to the Deputy Director of the Central Intelligence Agency Frank Carlucci. He retired in 1980.

=== USS Liberty incident ===
Smith was stationed in Beirut, Lebanon during the 1967 Six-Day War. After the Israel Defense Forces attacked the USS Liberty, U.S. Ambassador to Lebanon Dwight J. Porter revealed that he had listened to radio transcripts that showed the Israelis knew they were attacking an American ship. Smith said that although he never saw the transcripts, he had “heard on a number of occasions exactly the story that you just told me about what that transcript contained. [I was later told] that ultimately all of the transcripts were deep-sixed. I was told that they were deep-sixed because the administration did not wish to embarrass the Israelis.”

=== Special techniques ===
He was the creator of espionage techniques used by the CIA during the Cold War in the Soviet Union and Eastern Europe, including the brush contact, a means by which an intelligence officer and his agent exchanged items in public places and the creation and manipulation of the gap, a small period of time where the intelligence officer or his agent were not under enemy surveillance.

== Post CIA career ==
Since his retirement, Smith contributed Op-eds to local New England papers as well as The Boston Globe, the Hartford Courant, The Baltimore Sun and The Washington Post. He also wrote regularly for Nieman Watchdog and American Diplomacy and lectured around the Eastern U.S. on Russia, the Soviet Union, the Middle East, Terrorism and the intelligence process.

== Personal life ==
Smith died at his home in Monroe Township, Middlesex County, New Jersey, on June 25, 2024, at the age of 94, following a battle with COVID-19 and chronic obstructive pulmonary disease.

== Sources ==
- Ex-CIA Officer Will Visit DCC to Give Lecture on Middle East, a lecture broadcast on C-SPAN.
- Mini Biography, on the American Diplomacy website.
- https://books.google.com/books?id=2_kmzYET9VkC&dq=%22Haviland+Smith%22&pg=PA422
- https://web.archive.org/web/20110928075944/http://www.exeter.edu/documents/Exeter_Bulletin/SP10_Profile_Smith.pdf
- http://www.niemanwatchdog.org/index.cfm?fuseaction=about.viewcontributors&bioid=236
- http://www.c-spanvideo.org/program/283698-1
- https://web.archive.org/web/20100708030840/http://bakerinstitute.org/events/challenges-for-clandestine-intelligence-collection-in-support-of-u.s.-middle-east-policy
- http://www.c-spanvideo.org/program/283698-1
