= Joan Fontaine =

British-American actress (1917–2013)

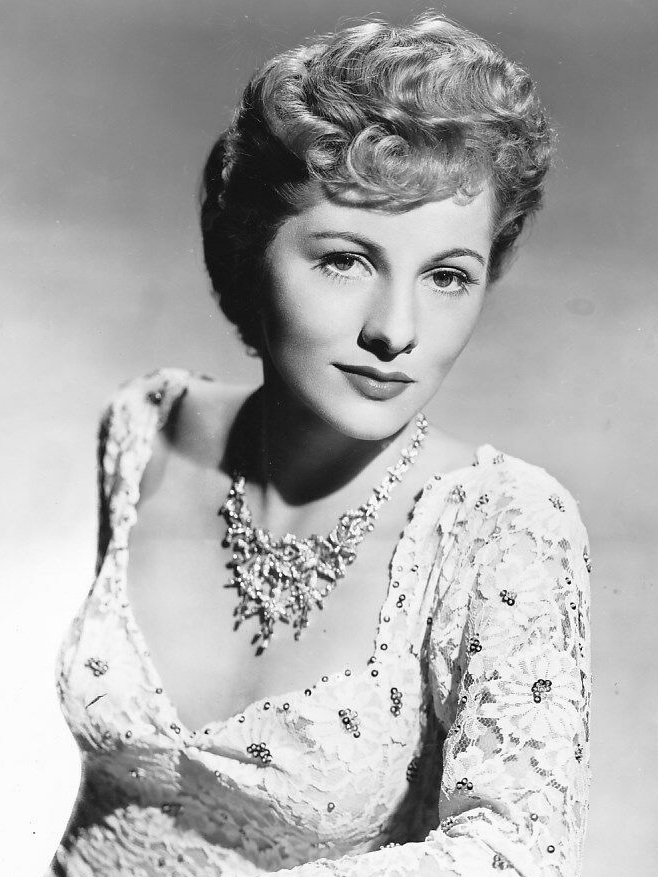
- Fontaine in 1943
- Born: Joan de Beauvoir de Havilland; October 22, 1917; Tokyo City, Empire of Japan
- Died: December 15, 2013 (aged 96); Carmel Highlands, California, U.S.
- Other name: Joan Burfield
- Citizenship: United Kingdom; United States (from 1943)
- Education: American School in Japan
- Occupation: Actress
- Years active: 1935–1994
- Political party: Democratic
- Spouses: Brian Aherne (m. 1939; div. 1945) William Dozier (m. 1946; div. 1951) Collier Young (m. 1952; div. 1961) Alfred Wright Jr. (m. 1964; div. 1969)
- Children: 2
- Parents: Walter de Havilland (father); Lilian Fontaine (mother)
- Relatives: Olivia de Havilland (sister); Hereward de Havilland (cousin); Geoffrey de Havilland (cousin)
- Awards: Academy Award for Best Actress (1941)

Joan de Beauvoir de Havilland (October 22, 1917 – December 15, 2013), known professionally as Joan Fontaine, was a British-American actress best known for her film roles during the Golden Age of Hollywood. Fontaine appeared in more than 45 films in a career that spanned five decades. She was the younger sister of actress Olivia de Havilland. Their rivalry was well documented in the media at the height of Fontaine's career.

Fontaine began her film career in 1935, signing a contract with RKO Pictures. Fontaine received her first major roles in The Man Who Found Himself (1937) and in Gunga Din (1939). Her career prospects improved greatly after her starring role in Alfred Hitchcock's Rebecca (1940), for which she received her first of three nominations for the Academy Award for Best Actress. The following year, she won that award for her role in Hitchcock's Suspicion (1941). A third nomination came with The Constant Nymph (1943). She appeared mostly in drama films through the 1940s, including Letter from an Unknown Woman and the comedy You Gotta Stay Happy (both 1948), which she co-produced with her second husband William Dozier through their film production company Rampart Productions. In the next decade, after her role in Ivanhoe (1952), her film career began to decline and she moved into stage, radio and television roles. She appeared in fewer films in the 1960s, which included Voyage to the Bottom of the Sea (1961), and her final film role in The Witches (1966), also known as The Devil's Own.

She released an autobiography, No Bed of Roses, in 1978, and continued to act until 1994. Her Academy Award for Suspicion makes Fontaine the only actress to have won an Oscar for acting in a Hitchcock film. She and her sister Olivia remain the only siblings to have won lead-acting Academy Awards.

== Early life ==
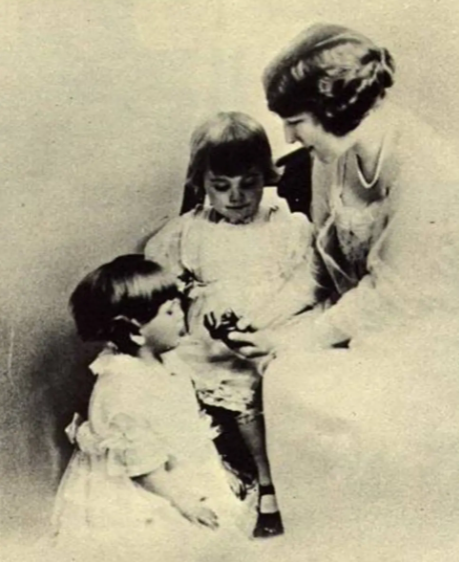
Fontaine with sister Olivia de Havilland (center) and mother Lilian Fontaine, c. 1922

Joan de Beauvoir de Havilland was born on October 22, 1917, in Tokyo City, in the then Empire of Japan, to English parents. Her father, Walter de Havilland (1872–1968), was educated at the University of Cambridge and served as an English professor at the Imperial University in Tokyo before becoming a patent attorney. Her mother, Lilian Augusta Ruse de Havilland Fontaine (1886–1975), was educated at the Royal Academy of Dramatic Art in London and became a stage actress who left her career after going to Tokyo with her husband. Her mother returned to work with the stage name "Lilian Fontaine" after Joan and her elder sister Olivia de Havilland achieved prominence in the 1940s. Joan's paternal cousin was Sir Geoffrey de Havilland (1882–1965), an aircraft designer known for the de Havilland Mosquito, and founder of the aircraft company which bore his name. Her paternal grandfather, the Reverend Charles Richard de Havilland, was from a family from Guernsey, in the Channel Islands.

De Havilland's parents married in 1914 and separated in 1919 when she was two; the divorce was not finalized, however, until February 1925.

Taking a physician's advice, Lilian de Havilland moved Joan‍—‌reportedly a sickly child who had developed anaemia following a combined attack of the measles and a streptococcal infection‍—‌and her sister to the United States. The family settled in Saratoga, California, and Fontaine's health improved dramatically during her teen years. She was educated at nearby Los Gatos High School and was soon taking diction lessons alongside Olivia. When she was 16 years old, Joan returned to Japan to live with her father. There she attended the American School in Japan, graduating in 1935.

== Career ==
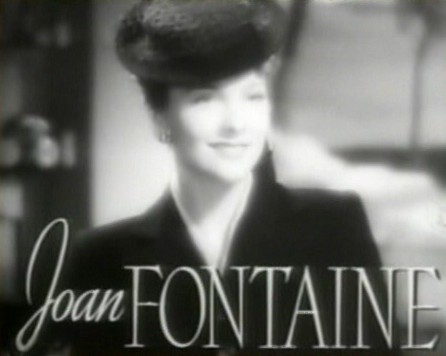
Trailer for The Women (1939)

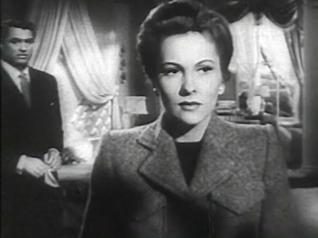
With Cary Grant in Suspicion (1941)

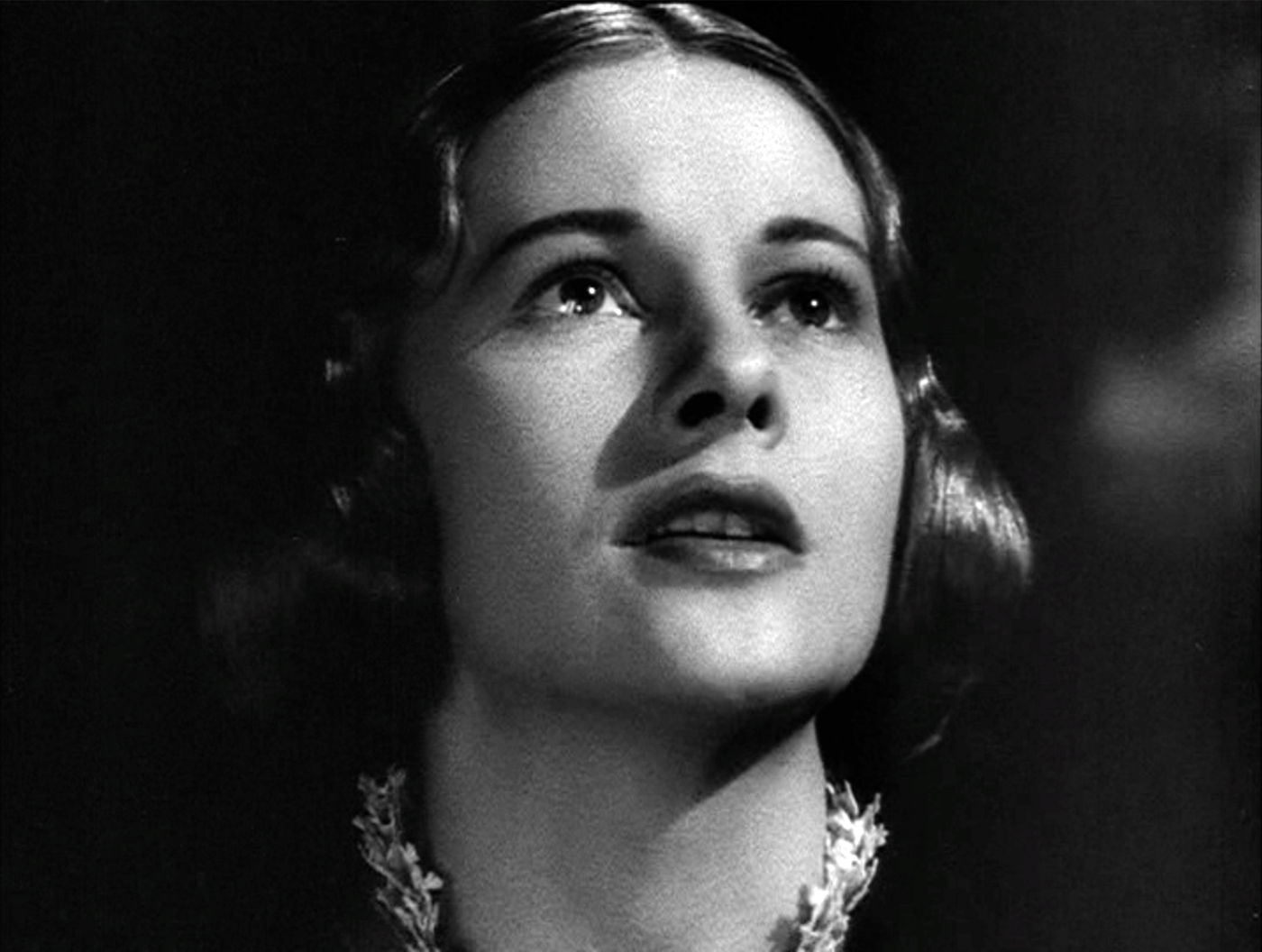
Jane Eyre (1943)

Fontaine made her stage debut in the West Coast production of Call It a Day (1935) and made her film debut in MGM's No More Ladies (1935), in which she was credited as Joan Burfield. She was leading lady to Bruce Bennett (billed as Herman Brix) in a low-budget independent film, A Million to One (1937).

=== RKO ===
Fontaine signed a contract with RKO Pictures. Her first film for the studio was Quality Street (1937) starring Katharine Hepburn, in which Fontaine had a small unbilled role.

The studio considered her a rising star, and touted The Man Who Found Himself (1937) with John Beal as her first starring role, placing a special screen introduction, billed as the "new RKO screen personality" after the end credit. Fontaine later said it had "an A budget but a Z story".

RKO put her in You Can't Beat Love (1937) with Preston Foster and Music for Madame (1937) with Nino Martini.

She next appeared in a major role alongside Fred Astaire in his first RKO film without Ginger Rogers, A Damsel in Distress (1937). Despite its being directed by George Stevens, audiences were disappointed and the film flopped. She was top-billed in the comedies Maid's Night Out and Blond Cheat, then was Richard Dix's leading lady in Sky Giant (all 1938).

Edward Small borrowed her to play Louis Hayward's love interest in The Duke of West Point (1938), then Stevens used her at RKO in Gunga Din (1939) as Douglas Fairbanks Jr.'s love interest. The film was a huge hit, but Fontaine's part was relatively small. Republic borrowed her to support Dix in Man of Conquest (1939) but her part was small. George Cukor gave her a small role in MGM's The Women (1939).

=== David O. Selznick and Hitchcock ===
Fontaine's luck changed one night at a dinner party when she found herself seated next to producer David O. Selznick. Selznick and she began discussing the Daphne du Maurier novel Rebecca, and Selznick asked her to audition for the part of the unnamed heroine. She endured a grueling six-month series of film tests along with hundreds of other actresses before securing the part sometime before her 22nd birthday.

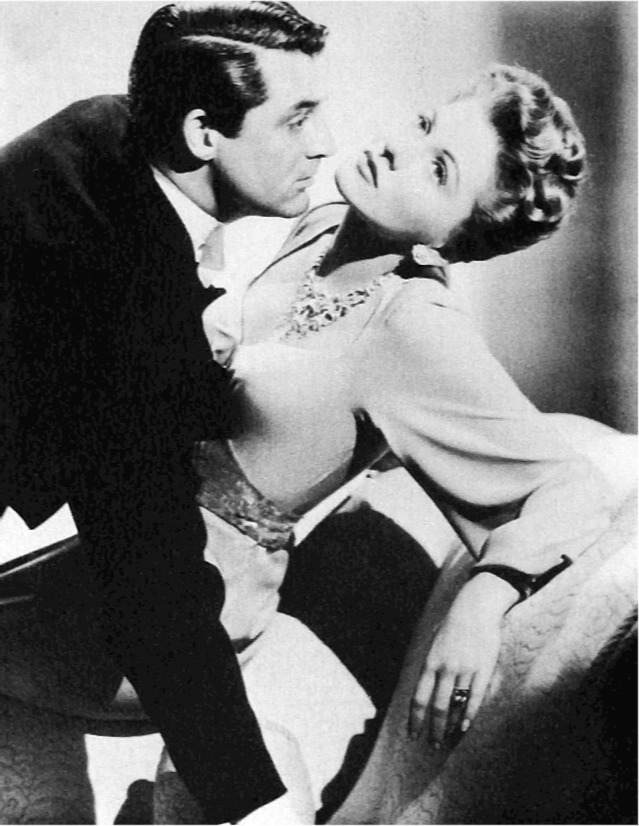
Fontaine and Cary Grant in promotional still for Suspicion (1941)

Rebecca (1940), starring Laurence Olivier alongside Fontaine, marked the American debut of British director Alfred Hitchcock. The film was released to glowing reviews, and Fontaine was nominated for an Academy Award for Best Actress. Fontaine did not win that year (Ginger Rogers took home the award for Kitty Foyle), but she did win the following year for Best Actress in Suspicion, which co-starred Cary Grant and was also directed by Hitchcock. This was the only Academy Award-winning acting performance to have been directed by Hitchcock.

Fontaine was then one of the biggest female stars in Hollywood, although she was typecast in female melodrama. "They seemed to want to make me cry the whole Atlantic", she later said. However, historically, she had become the top female star of the 1940s.

20th Century Fox borrowed her to appear opposite Tyrone Power in This Above All (1942) then she went to Warner Brothers to star alongside Charles Boyer in The Constant Nymph. She was nominated for a third Academy Award for her performance in this film.

She also starred as the titular protagonist in the film Jane Eyre that year, which was developed by Selznick then sold to Fox.

During the war Fontaine occasionally worked as a nurse's aide.

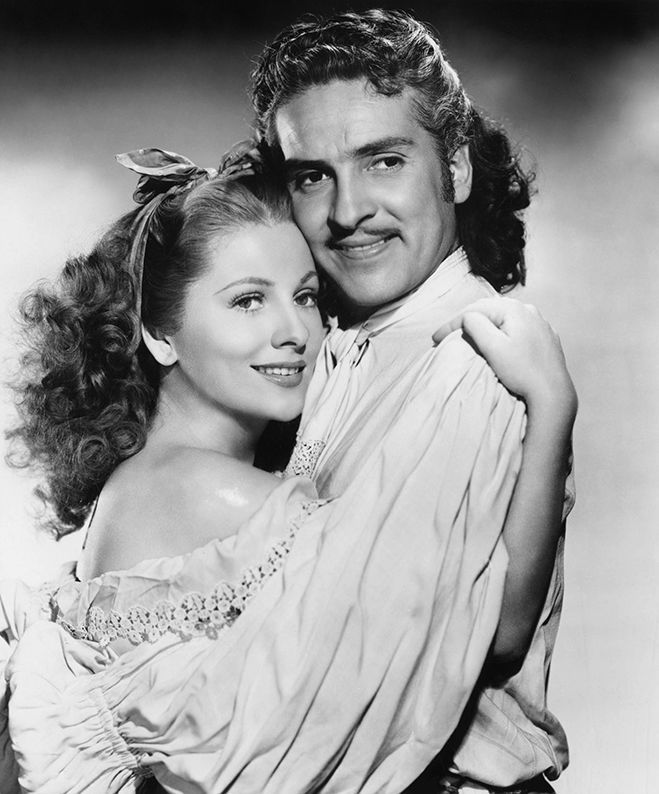
Fontaine with Arturo de Córdova in Frenchman's Creek (1944)

She starred in the film Frenchman's Creek (1944). Like Rebecca, this was based on a novel by Daphne du Maurier. Fontaine personally considered Frenchman's Creek one of her least favorites among the films she starred in.

Selznick wanted to cast her in I'll Be Seeing You (1944) but she refused, saying she was "sick of playing the sad sack". Selznick suspended her for eight months. Eventually she went back to work in The Affairs of Susan (1945) for Hal Wallis at Paramount, her first comedy. She returned to RKO for From This Day Forward (1946).

=== Rampart Productions ===
In August 1946 Fontaine set up her own company, Rampart Productions, with her then-husband William Dozier. Her contract with Selznick ended in February 1947 and Fontaine would work exclusively for Rampart apart from one film a year for RKO.

Their first film was Ivy (1947), a thriller where she played an unsympathetic part.

Fontaine also appeared in Letter from an Unknown Woman (1948) directed by Max Ophüls, produced by John Houseman and co-starring Louis Jourdan. It was made by Rampart Productions and released through Universal. It is today considered to be a classic with one of the finest performances of her career.

At Paramount, she appeared opposite Bing Crosby in Billy Wilder's The Emperor Waltz (1948) then went to Universal for another film for Rampart, You Gotta Stay Happy (1948), a comedy with James Stewart.

Fontaine starred in Kiss the Blood Off My Hands (1948), with Burt Lancaster, Nathan Juran and Bernard Herzbrun. Art directors, and set decorators created thirty blocks of huge sets to represent the waterfront district of London's East End in this successful film noir. At Paramount she did September Affair (1950) with Joseph Cotten for Wallis, Darling, How Could You! (1951) and Something to Live For (1952), a third film with George Stevens. At RKO she was a femme fatale in Born to Be Bad (1950).

MGM hired Fontaine to play the love interest in Ivanhoe (1952), a big success. She was reunited with Jourdan in Decameron Nights (1953) then went to Paramount for the low-budget Flight to Tangier (1953) with Jack Palance.

=== Film, TV, and theatre ===
Fontaine made The Bigamist (1953), directed by Ida Lupino. She began appearing in TV shows such as Four Star Playhouse, Ford Theatre, Star Stage, The 20th Century Fox Hour, The Joseph Cotten Show, and General Electric Theater.

She won good reviews for her role on Broadway in 1954 as Laura in Tea and Sympathy, playing the role originated by Deborah Kerr. She appeared opposite Anthony Perkins and toured the show for a few months.

She was Bob Hope's leading lady in Casanova's Big Night, then supported Mario Lanza in Serenade (both 1956). She was in Fritz Lang's Beyond a Reasonable Doubt (1956) at RKO.

Fontaine had a big hit with Island in the Sun (1957) having a romance with Harry Belafonte. At MGM she appeared with Jean Simmons and Paul Newman in Until They Sail (1957) then she made A Certain Smile (1958) at Fox.

=== 1960s ===
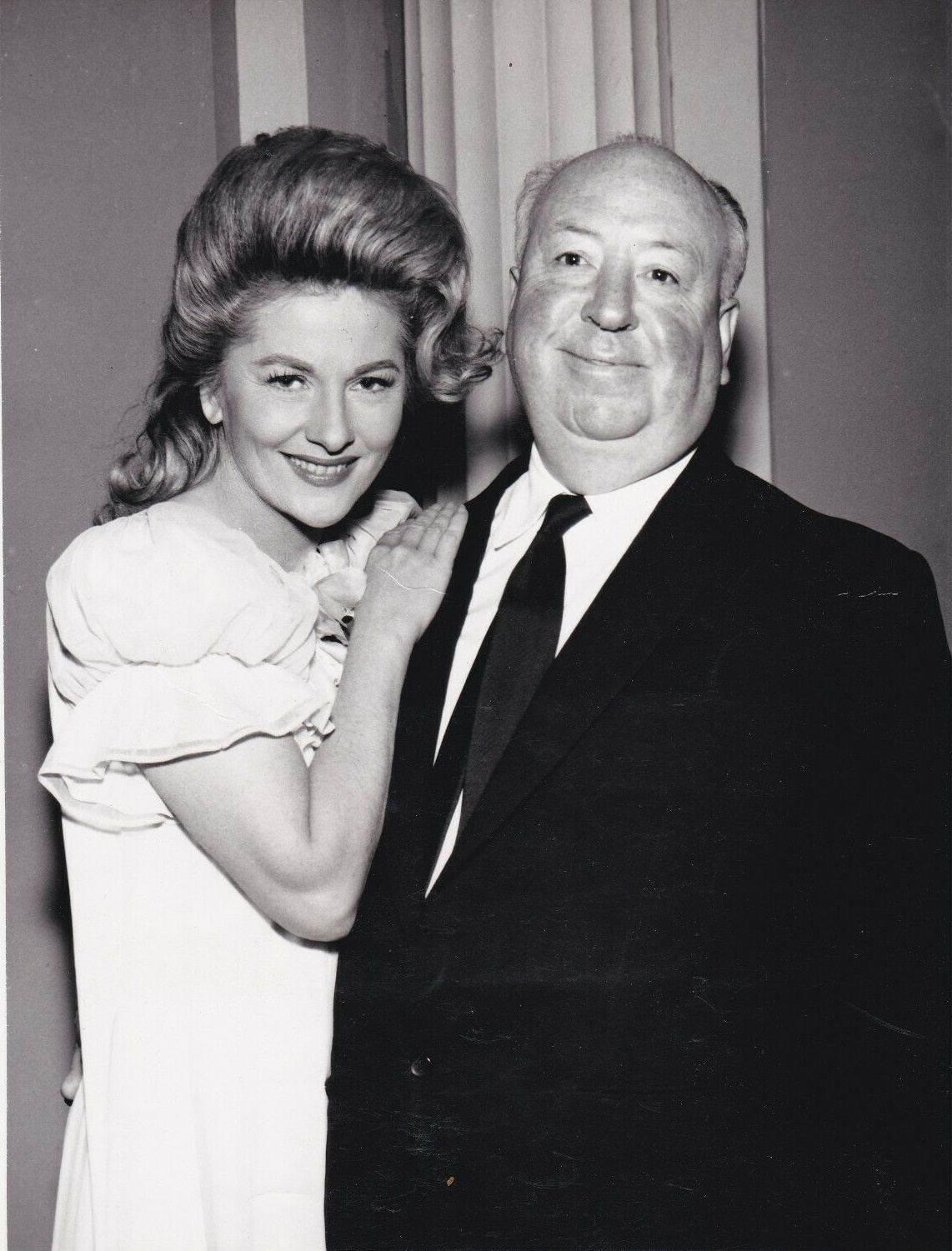
Fontaine with Alfred Hitchcock in 1963

Fontaine had the female lead in the popular Voyage to the Bottom of the Sea (1961) at Fox. She had a key role in Tender Is the Night (1962) also at Fox.

Most of her 1960s work was done on television or stage. TV shows included General Electric Theater, Westinghouse Desilu Playhouse, Startime, Alcoa Presents: One Step Beyond, Checkmate, The Dick Powell Show, Kraft Television Theatre, Wagon Train, Alfred Hitchcock Presents, and The Bing Crosby Show.

In October 1964 she returned to Broadway to appear in A Severed Head.

She appeared in a Hammer horror film, The Witches (1966) which she also co-produced. It would become the final theatrical film role for her, although she continued to act in television productions and on stage.

Her stage work included Cactus Flower and an Austrian production of The Lion in Winter.

In 1967, she appeared in Dial M for Murder in Chicago. The following year she appeared in Private Lives.

She played Forty Carats on Broadway.

=== Later career ===
In the 1970s Fontaine appeared in stage shows and toured with a poetry reading.

She returned to Hollywood for the first time in 15 years in 1975 to appear in an episode of Cannon especially written for her. She was in The Users (1978) and was nominated for an Emmy Award for the soap opera Ryan's Hope in 1980.

Fontaine published her autobiography, No Bed of Roses, in 1978. In 1982, she traveled to Berlin, Germany, and served as a jury president for the Berlin International Film Festival.

In the early 1980s, after 25 years in New York, she moved to Carmel, California. "I have no family ties anymore, so I want to work", she said. "I still host an interview show for cable in New York. I lecture all over the country. But it wasn't enough. My theory is that if you stay busy, you haven't time to grow old. Or at least you don't notice it."

She starred in Aloha Paradise, Bare Essence, and Crossings (1986). She played the lead in a TV movie, Dark Crossings (1986), replacing Loretta Young. She said, "At my time in life, I don't want to do bit parts. Also, Rosalind Russell once said, 'Always escape the mother parts.' And I've avoided them."

Fontaine's last role for television was in the 1994 TV film Good King Wenceslas, after which she retired to her estate, Villa Fontana, in Carmel Highlands, California, where she spent time in her gardens and with her dogs.

For her contribution to the motion picture industry, Fontaine has a star on the Hollywood Walk of Fame at 1645 Vine Street. She left her hand and foot prints in front of the Grauman's Chinese Theatre on May 26, 1942.

She was a practicing Episcopalian and a member of Episcopal Actors Guild.

== Sibling rivalry ==
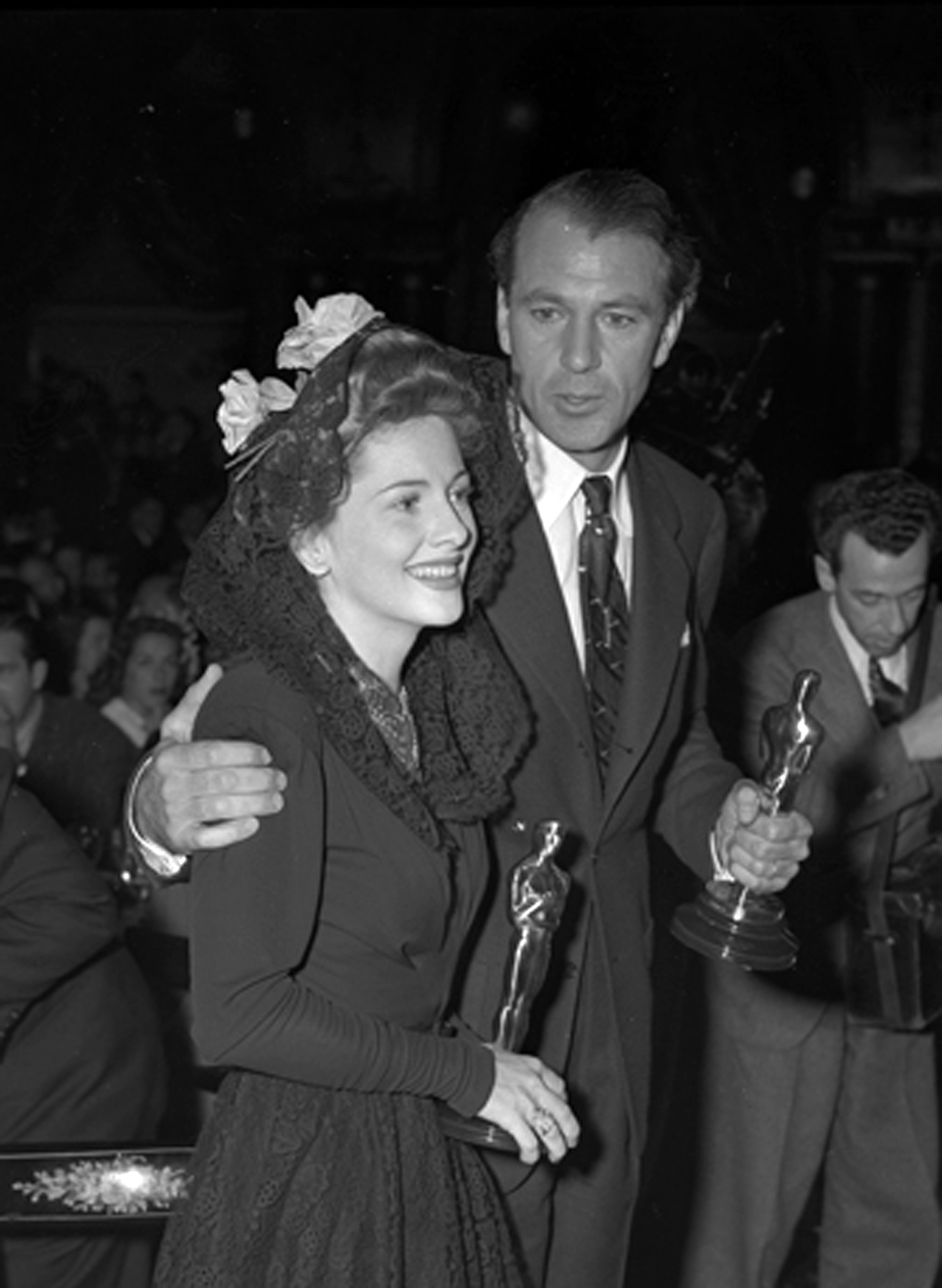
Fontaine and Gary Cooper holding their Oscars at the 14th Academy Awards, 1942

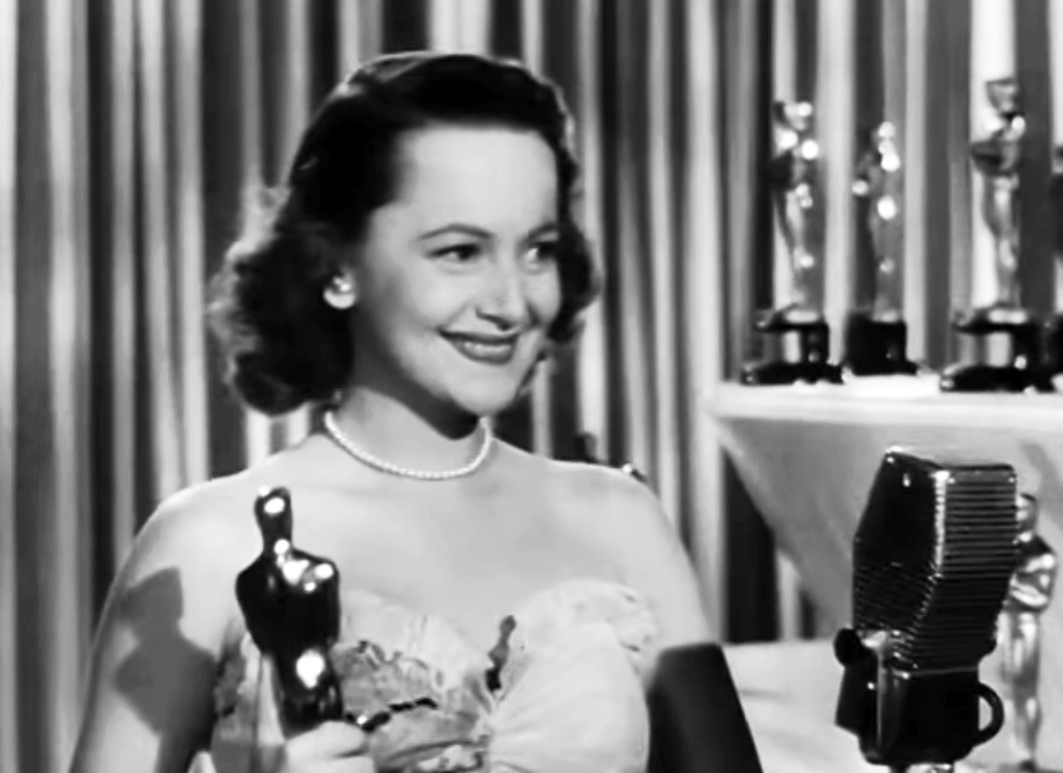
Fontaine's sister Olivia de Havilland, with her first Oscar award March 13, 1947

Fontaine and her elder sister, Olivia de Havilland, are the only siblings to have won lead acting Academy Awards. Olivia was the first to become an actress; when Fontaine tried to follow her lead, their mother, who favored Olivia, initially refused to let Joan use the family name. Subsequently, Fontaine first adopted Joan Burfield. She assumed her mother's married surname as a stage name when she appeared in the play Call It a Day, being credited as Joan Fontaine.

Biographer Charles Higham records that the sisters had an uneasy relationship from early childhood, when Olivia would rip up the clothes Joan had to wear as hand-me-downs, forcing Joan to sew them back together. A large part of the friction between the sisters stemmed from Fontaine's belief that Olivia was their mother's favorite child.

De Havilland and Fontaine were both nominated for the Academy Award for Best Actress in 1942. Fontaine won for her role in Alfred Hitchcock's Suspicion over de Havilland's performance in Hold Back the Dawn. Higham states that Fontaine "felt guilty about winning given her lack of obsessive career drive ...". Higham has described the events of the awards ceremony, stating that as Fontaine stepped forward to collect her award, she pointedly rejected de Havilland's attempts to congratulate her and that de Havilland was both offended and embarrassed by her behavior. Fontaine, however, tells a different story in her autobiography, explaining that she was paralyzed with surprise when she won the Academy Award, and that de Havilland insisted that she get up to accept it. "Olivia took the situation very graciously", Fontaine wrote. "I was appalled that I'd won over my sister."

Contrary to press reports, the sisters continued their relationship after the 1940s. After Fontaine's separation from her husband in 1952, de Havilland went to her apartment in New York often, and at least once they spent Christmas together there, in 1961. They were photographed laughing together at a party for Marlene Dietrich in 1967. Fontaine also visited de Havilland in Paris in 1969.

The sisters reportedly did not completely stop speaking to each other until 1975, after their mother's funeral, to which Joan, who was out of the country, was not invited.

Both sisters largely refused to comment publicly about their relationship. In a 1978 interview, however, Fontaine said of the sibling rivalry, "I married first, won the Oscar before Olivia did, and if I die first, she'll undoubtedly be livid because I beat her to it!" The following year, in a 1979 interview, Fontaine claimed the reason her sister and she stopped speaking to each other was that de Havilland wanted their mother (who was suffering from cancer) to be treated surgically at the age of 88. Fontaine disagreed with the idea especially after having spent months talking to her mother preparing her for death (Lilian did not want to live). Fontaine also claimed in her 1979 interview that after their mother died, de Havilland did not bother to try to find where Fontaine could be reached (Fontaine was on tour in a play). Instead, de Havilland sent a telegram, which did not arrive until two weeks later at Fontaine's next stop. According to Fontaine, de Havilland did not invite her to a memorial service for their mother. De Havilland claims she informed Fontaine, but Fontaine brushed her off, claiming she was too busy to attend. Higham records that Fontaine had an estranged relationship with her own daughters, as well, possibly because she discovered that they were secretly maintaining a relationship with de Havilland.

== Personal life and death ==
Fontaine held dual citizenship; she was British by birthright (both her parents were British) and became an American citizen in April 1943. Outside of acting, Fontaine was also noted as being a licensed pilot, an accomplished interior decorator, and a Cordon Bleu–level chef.

She was married and divorced four times. Her first marriage was to actor Brian Aherne, in 1939, at the St. John's Chapel in Del Monte, California; they divorced in April 1945.

In May 1946, she married actor/producer William Dozier in Mexico City. They had a daughter, Deborah Leslie, in 1948, and separated in 1949. Deborah is Fontaine's only biological child. The following year, Fontaine filed for divorce, charging Dozier with desertion. Their divorce was final in January 1951. The two of them had a custody battle over their child which lingered through the 1950s.

Fontaine's third marriage was to producer and writer Collier Young on November 12, 1952. They separated in May 1960, and Fontaine filed for divorce in November 1960. Their divorce was final in January 1961.

Fontaine's fourth and final marriage was to Sports Illustrated golf editor Alfred Wright Jr, on January 23, 1964, in Elkton, Maryland; they divorced in 1969. Fontaine also had a personal relationship with politician Adlai Stevenson II: "We had a tenderness for each other that grew into something rather serious. There was so much speculation about our marrying in the press that over lunch at his apartment in the Waldorf Towers he told me he could not marry an actress. He still had political ambitions and the 'little old ladies from Oshkosh' wouldn't approve. I told him it was just as well. My family would hardly approve of my marrying a politician".

Fontaine had an affair with actor and producer John Houseman after her marriage to Aherne. "Ours was what was known in Hollywood as a 'romance,'—which meant that we slept together three or four nights a week, got invited to parties together, went away together for weekends, and sometimes talked about getting married without really meaning it," Houseman wrote in Front and Center, his second autobiography.

While in South America for a film festival in 1951, Fontaine met a four-year-old Peruvian girl named Martita, and informally adopted her. Fontaine met Martita while visiting Incan ruins where Martita's father worked as a caretaker. Martita's parents allowed Fontaine to become Martita's legal guardian to give the child a better life. Fontaine promised Martita's parents she would send the girl back to Peru to visit when she was 16 years old. When Martita turned 16, Fontaine bought her a round-trip ticket to Peru, but Martita refused to go and opted to run away. Fontaine and Martita became estranged following the incident. While promoting her autobiography in 1978, Fontaine addressed the issue, stating, "Until my adopted daughter goes back to see her parents, she's not welcome. I promised her parents. I do not forgive somebody who makes me break my word."

Fontaine converted to the Episcopal Church in 1972 after a bleak period.

On December 15, 2013, Fontaine died in her sleep of natural causes at the age of 96 in her Carmel Highlands home. Her longtime friend Noel Beutel said, "She had been fading in recent days and died peacefully." After Fontaine's death, Olivia de Havilland released a statement saying she was "shocked and saddened" by the news.

Fontaine's Academy Award for Best Actress in Suspicion was initially to be sold at an animal rights auction; however, the Academy threatened to sue since it was not offered back to them for $1 and Fontaine's estate retained possession.

== Filmography ==
Year	Title	Role	Notes
1935	No More Ladies	Caroline "Carrie" Rumsey	Credited as Joan Burfield
1937	A Million to One	Joan Stevens	
1937	Quality Street	Charlotte Parratt	Uncredited
1937	The Man Who Found Himself	Nurse Doris King	
1937	You Can't Beat Love	Trudy Olson	
1937	Music for Madame	Jean Clemens	
1937	A Damsel in Distress	Lady Alyce Marshmorton	
1938	Maid's Night Out	Sheila Harrison	
1938	Blond Cheat	Juliette "Julie" Evans	
1938	Sky Giant	Meg Lawrence	
1938	The Duke of West Point	Ann Porter	
1939	Gunga Din	Emmy	
1939	Man of Conquest	Eliza Allen	
1939	The Women	Mrs. John Day (Peggy)	
1940	Rebecca	The second Mrs. de Winter	Directed by Alfred Hitchcock; Nominated – Academy Award for Best Actress; Nominated – New York Film Critics Circle Award for Best Actress
1941	Suspicion	Lina	Directed by Alfred Hitchcock; Academy Award for Best Actress; New York Film Critics Circle Award for Best Actress
1942	This Above All	Prudence Cathaway	
1943	The Constant Nymph	Tessa Sanger	Nominated – Academy Award for Best Actress
1943	Jane Eyre	Jane Eyre (as an adult)	
1944	Frenchman's Creek	Dona St. Columb	
1945	The Affairs of Susan	Susan Darell	
1946	From This Day Forward	Susan Cummings	
1947	Ivy	Ivy	
1948	Letter from an Unknown Woman	Lisa Berndle	
1948	The Emperor Waltz	Countess Johanna Augusta Franziska	
1948	You Gotta Stay Happy	Dee Dee Dillwood	
1948	Kiss the Blood Off My Hands	Jane Wharton	
1950	September Affair	Marianne "Manina" Stuart	
1950	Born to Be Bad	Christabel Caine Carey	
1951	Darling, How Could You!	Alice Grey	
1951	Othello	Page	Uncredited Cameo
1952	Something to Live For	Jenny Carey	
1952	Ivanhoe	Rowena	
1953	Decameron Nights	Fiametta/Bartolomea/Ginevra/Isabella	
1953	Flight to Tangier	Susan Lane	
1953	The Bigamist	Eve Graham	
1954	Casanova's Big Night	Francesca Bruni	Alternative title: Mr. Casanova
1956	Serenade	Kendall Hale	
1956	Beyond a Reasonable Doubt	Susan Spencer	
1957	Island in the Sun	Mavis Norman	
1957	Until They Sail	Anne Leslie	
1958	A Certain Smile	Françoise Ferrand	
1958	South Pacific	Polynesian woman	
1961	The Light That Failed	Hostess	TV movie
1961	Voyage to the Bottom of the Sea	Dr. Susan Hiller	
1962	Tender Is the Night	Baby Warren	
1966	The Witches	Gwen Mayfield	Alternative title: The Devil's Own
1978	The Users	Grace St. George	TV movie
1986	Dark Mansions	Margaret Drake	TV movie
1994	Good King Wenceslas	Queen Ludmilla	TV movie

== Television credits ==
Year	Title	Role	Episode(s)
1953– 1954	Four Star Playhouse	Trudy	"Trudy" "The Girl on the Park Bench"
1956	The Ford Television Theatre	Julie	"Your Other Love"
1956	Star Stage		"The Shadowy Third"
1956	The 20th Century Fox Hour	Lynne Abbott	"Stranger In the Night"
1956– 1957	The Joseph Cotten Show	Adrienne	"Fatal Charm" "The De Santre Story"
1956– 1960	General Electric Theater	Linda Stacey; Judith; Laurel Chapman; Melanie Langdon; Countess Irene Forelli	"A Possibility of Oil" "The Story of Judith" "At Miss Minner's" "The Victorian Chaise Lounge" "In Summer Promise"
1957	Mr. Adams and Eve	Herself	"Joan Fontaine"
1959	Westinghouse Desilu Playhouse	Margaret Lewis	"Perilous"
1960	Startime	Julie Forbes	"Closed Set"
1960	Alcoa Presents: One Step Beyond	Ellen Grayson	"The Visitor"
1961	Checkmate	Karen Lawson	"Voyage Into Fear"
1962	The Dick Powell Show	Valerie Baumer	"The Clocks"
1962	Kraft Mystery Theatre	Margaret Lewis	"Perilous"
1963	Wagon Train	Naomi Kaylor	"The Naomi Kaylor Story"
1963	The Alfred Hitchcock Hour	Alice Pemberton	Season 1 Episode 20: "The Paragon"
1965	The Bing Crosby Show	Mrs. Taylor	"Operation Man Save"
1975	Cannon	Thelma Cain	episode: "The Star"
1980	Ryan's Hope	Paige Williams	Five episodes Nominated – Daytime Emmy Award Outstanding Cameo Appearance in a Daytime Drama Series
1981	Aloha Paradise	"Love Teacher/The Actress/Prodigy" "Turn Me On/Treasure Hunt/A Child Will Become Father"	
1981	The Love Boat	Jennifer Langley	"Chef's Special/Beginning Anew/Kleinschmidt"
1983	Bare Essence	Laura	"Hour Four" "Hour Five"
1986	Hotel	Ruth Easton	"Harassed"
1986	Crossings	Alexandra Markham	Miniseries

== Broadway credits ==
Date	Production	Role
September 30, 1953 – June 18, 1955	Tea and Sympathy	Laura Reynolds
December 26, 1968 – November 7, 1970	Forty Carats	Ann Stanley

== Radio appearances ==
Year	Program	Episode/source
1941	The Screen Guild Theater	Waterloo Bridge
1943	The Screen Guild Theater	Suspicion
1943	The Screen Guild Theater	Rebecca
1944	The Screen Guild Theater	A Farewell to Arms
1945	The Screen Guild Theater	Next Time We Love
1946	The Screen Guild Theater	Last of Mrs. Cheyney
1946	Lux Radio Theatre	From This Day Forward
1946	Academy Award	Portrait of Jennie
1946	Hollywood Players	The Constant Nymph
1948	The Screen Guild Theater	Ivy
1949	Suspense	The Lovebirds
1950	The Screen Guild Theater	Ninotchka
1952	Hallmark Playhouse	Miracle on the Blotter
1952	Broadway Playhouse	Manhattan Serenade
1952	Theatre Guild on the Air	The House of Mirth
1952	Hollywood Sound Stage	Ivy
1953	Theater of Stars	The Guardsman
1953	Lux Summer Theatre	Leave Her to Heaven
1953	Lux Radio Theatre	Undercurrent
1953	General Electric Theater	Enchanted Cottage
1953	Lux Radio Theatre	The President's Lady
1954	Gunsmoke	The Handcuffs

== Awards and nominations ==
Year	Organization	Category	Title of work	Result	Ref.
1941	Academy Awards	Best Actress	Rebecca	Nominated	
1942	Academy Awards	Best Actress	Suspicion	Won	
1944	Academy Awards	Best Actress	The Constant Nymph	Nominated	
1940	New York Film Critics' Circle	Best Actress	Rebecca	Nominated	
1941	New York Film Critics' Circle	Best Actress	Suspicion	Won	
1943	Golden Apple Award	Least Cooperative Actress	—N/a	Won	
1947	Golden Apple Award	Most Cooperative Actress	—N/a	Won	
1980	Daytime Emmy Award	Outstanding Cameo Appearance in a Daytime Drama Series	Ryan's Hope	Nominated	
