= William Dozier =

American film and television producer, writer and actor (1908–1991)

- Born: February 13, 1908; Omaha, Nebraska, U.S.
- Died: April 23, 1991 (aged 83); Santa Monica, California, U.S.
- Occupations: Producer; writer; actor
- Years active: 1944–1982
- Spouses: Katharine Foley (m. 1929; div. 1946) Joan Fontaine (m. 1946; div. 1951) Ann Rutherford (m. 1953)
- Children: 2

William McElroy Dozier (/ˈdoʊʒər/; February 13, 1908 – April 23, 1991) was an American film and television producer, writer and actor. He is best known for creating two television series, Batman and The Green Hornet, both of which he also distinctively narrated.

== Early life ==
Dozier was born in Omaha, Nebraska, and graduated from Creighton University in 1929, where he studied law.

== Career ==
Dozier began his career as a television writer and then moved into production. With his second wife Joan Fontaine, he co-founded Rampart Productions, responsible for Letter from an Unknown Woman (1948). In 1950, he produced the film noir Harriet Craig, starring Joan Crawford. In the early 1950s he was executive producer for dramatic programs on CBS television including You Are There, Ben Hecht's Tales of the City and Suspense. In 1959 Dozier left CBS-TV, and took over as vice-president in charge of production at Screen Gems, replacing Irving Briskin.

After founding a new company in 1964, Greenway Productions, he took on the development of the Batman television series (1966–1968), as executive producer and narrator, although he was uncredited for the role as narrator. He also performed those functions on The Green Hornet television show, which starred Van Williams and Bruce Lee, although here the narration was limited to the opening, the next-episode trailers, and the story-so-far recaps in its three two-part episodes. The Green Hornet gave Bruce Lee his first acting role in an American TV or film production, although he had appeared in Hong Kong–based films from his babyhood. This show introduced Bruce Lee as a martial arts fighter—indeed, it brought Asian martial arts to a broad American audience for the first time. In addition to his narration throughout the series, he appeared on-screen in the first and final Batman episodes: as the maître d' at What a Way to Go-Go in "Hi Diddle Riddle", and as 'Millionaire William Dozier' in "Minerva, Mayhem and Millionaires".

Dozier also made a screen test of an aborted version of Wonder Woman in 1967. He also produced an unsold Dick Tracy pilot that same year. During his time as executive producer of Batman he co-created the character Barbara Gordon, who would become a prominent character in the Batman comic books as well as the television series.

In 1979, Dozier appeared in The Paper Chase as Lindsey in "Scavenger Hunt", episode 22 of season 1.

== Personal life ==
Dozier was married to Katherine Foley from 1929 until their marriage ended in divorce in 1946. They had one son, Robert. Then, Dozier married actress Joan Fontaine in 1946; they divorced in 1951. They had one daughter, Deborah. Lastly, Dozier married Ann Rutherford in 1953. Their marriage would last until Dozier died in 1991.

== Death ==
Dozier died in Santa Monica, California, from a stroke, aged 83. Dozier was buried at Holy Cross Cemetery in Culver City, California. His papers can be found at the American Heritage Center.
