= Bill Skelton =

RAF officer (1920-2003)

Frank Seymour Skelton
- Born: 26 August 1920; Pirbright, Surrey
- Died: 24 May 2003 (aged 82)
- Military career
- Allegiance: United Kingdom
- Branch: Royal Air Force
- Service years: 1940–1945
- Rank: Squadron Leader
- Conflicts: Second World War
- Awards: Distinguished Service Order & Bar; Distinguished Flying Cross & Bar
- Other work: Anglican priest

Frank Seymour "Bill" Skelton DSO & Bar, DFC & Bar (26 August 1920 – 24 May 2003) became, with Branse Burbridge, a highly successful British night-fighter team during the Second World War and was later ordained an Anglican priest.

== Early life ==
Frank Seymour Skelton, always known as Bill, was born in Pirbright, Surrey, to Ronald Seymour Skelton and Dorothy Lucy, daughter of Thomas Wyard Druitt, and educated at Blundell's School. His father, a descendant of the 8th Duke of Somerset, was a garden designer who died when Skelton was 15 and the remainder of his time at Blundell's was financed by relations (including his cousin, the 17th Duke of Somerset, who employed Skelton as a page to carry his coronet at the coronation of King George VI and Queen Elizabeth in 1937). His uncle was (Henry) Aylmer Skelton, Bishop of Lincoln 1942–53.

== Second World War ==
Skelton enlisted in the Royal Air Force (RAF) in 1940, and was commissioned the following year to rise to the rank of acting squadron leader.

Known as "the night hawk partners", Skelton (as navigator) and Burbridge (as pilot) were officially credited with destroying 21 enemy aircraft, one more than Group Captain "Cat's Eyes" Cunningham.

Skelton's brilliance with airborne radar over Britain and Germany was recognised with the awards of a DFC and Bar in 1944 and a DSO and Bar in 1945; the citations of both Skelton and Burbridge referred to them setting "an unsurpassed example of outstanding keenness and devotion to duty".

Skelton and Burbridge first flew together in the "Baby Blitz", a German night-bomber offensive against England in the early months of 1944, mounted in retaliation for RAF attacks on Berlin. That May, the pair were posted as members of No 85 Squadron to 100 Group whose aircraft, equipped to carry out electronic counter-measures, escorted four-engined bombers over Germany.

On 4 November 1944, Skelton manoeuvred Burbridge so skilfully on to his German targets that the pair shot down two Ju 88 night fighters; they then craftily joined enemy aircraft circling the Bonn-Hangelar airfield and claimed a Bf 110 and another Ju 88. Despite heavy damage, their stricken Mosquito was coaxed back to base.

== Post-war ==
When the war ended both Skelton and Burbridge left the Royal Air Force and studied theology (Burbridge at Oxford, and Skelton at Cambridge).

Skelton read history and theology at Trinity Hall, Cambridge, and came under the influence of Launcelot Fleming, the Dean, a distinguished Royal Navy chaplain during the war and later Bishop of Norwich.

Skelton, a moderate evangelical, completed his training for the ministry at Ridley Hall, Cambridge. From 1950 to 1952, Skelton was a curate at Ormskirk, Lancashire, then returned to Cambridge as chaplain of Clare College. The Dean at this time was John Robinson, later to become a controversial Bishop of Woolwich, who had a special concern for church reform. Skelton shared in devising one of the early new ways of celebrating the Eucharist, and also in the re-ordering of the College chapel to make this possible. But his primary responsibility was pastoral work among the undergraduates, and he exercised this more widely in the Cambridge pastorate.

Also at Cambridge then, as vicar of Great St Mary's, the university church, was Mervyn Stockwood, who remembered Skelton as the most handsome boy at Blundell's School when he visited the school as its Missioner. When Stockwood and Robinson moved to Southwark, where they founded "South Bank religion", Skelton, whose own beliefs were now becoming more liberal, followed them.

From 1959 to 1969, Skelton was rector of the large parish of Bermondsey where, aided by four curates, he carried out a vigorous pastoral ministry, with much civic involvement throughout the area. He brought to this work the same meticulous approach that had characterised his wartime exploits.

In 1963, he became one of Bishop Stockwood's honorary chaplains, which mainly involved walking with him on Saturday afternoons. Two years later Skelton was appointed rural dean of Bermondsey. Stockwood tried, but failed, to persuade him to become suffragan Bishop of Kingston-upon-Thames, and later Skelton declined the offer of the Bishopric of Liverpool. In the circumstances this was probably wise, for in 1969 he had a severe emotional breakdown.

On his recovery, Skelton decided not to return to the direct service of the Church, and became director of the Lambeth Endowed Charities. Over the next 16 years, he administered with considerable flair an old housing estate, almshouses and several other charities, laying the foundations of their present financial strength.

He also became involved in the charitable work of the Worshipful Company of Coopers, of which he was a Liveryman for many years. Skelton served as Master in 1985, and was associated with St Botolph's Church, Aldgate, which provided him with a spiritual home in retirement.

Skelton was unmarried; but for the last 21 years of his life he found emotional fulfilment with his close friend Christopher Eldridge.
