= Branse Burbridge =

British military aviator (1921–2016)

- Born: 4 February 1921; Brixton, London
- Died: 1 November 2016 (aged 95); Chorleywood, Hertfordshire
- Military career
- Allegiance: United Kingdom
- Branch: Royal Air Force
- Service years: 1940–1945
- Rank: Wing Commander
- Nickname: Branse
- Service number: 100067
- Units: No. 85 Squadron; No. 141 Squadron; No. 157 Squadron; No. 100 Squadron
- Conflicts: Second World War
- Awards: Distinguished Service Order & Bar; Distinguished Flying Cross & Bar; Distinguished Flying Cross (United States)
- Other work: Scripture Union

Wing Commander Bransome Arthur "Branse" Burbridge, DSO & Bar, DFC & Bar (4 February 1921 – 1 November 2016) was a Royal Air Force (RAF) night fighter pilot and flying ace—a pilot credited with at least five enemy aircraft destroyed—who holds the Allied record of 21 aerial victories achieved at night during the Second World War.

Burbridge was born in February 1921 into a family with strong Christian and pacifist beliefs. Upon the outbreak of the Second World War in Europe on 3 September 1939 Burbridge registered himself as a conscientious objector but changed his mind in 1940 and enlisted in the RAF.

Burbridge completed his training within a year, was posted to No. 85 Squadron RAF and claimed one probable kill against enemy aircraft with another aircraft damaged by the end of 1942. Burbridge was then posted to an Operational Training Unit (OTU) as an instructor before spending a year as a staff officer. In July 1943 he reached the rank of flight lieutenant.

Burbridge returned to operations in late 1943 with No. 85 Squadron, equipped with the de Havilland Mosquito. The unit performed night defence operations over the British Isles. Burbridge flew with radar operator Bill Skelton, achieving much success in a relatively short time period. By the end of the German air offensive Steinbock in May 1944 he had shot down five enemy aircraft, making him a night fighter ace. Both men were awarded the Distinguished Flying Cross (DFC) in May 1944.

In June 1944 Operation Overlord and the Allied invasion of German-occupied Europe began reopening the Western Front. Burbridge flew sorties as an intruder pilot with No. 100 Group RAF over the front. He claimed two more kills with one probable and another damaged in these operations. Burbridge also destroyed three V-1 flying bombs over southern England.

In September 1944 No. 85 Squadron returned to intruding over Germany and supporting RAF Bomber Command. Burbridge was awarded a bar to his DFC in October 1944 and a Distinguished Service Order (DSO) the following month. From September 1944 to January 1945, Burbridge claimed 13 enemy night fighter aircraft destroyed — including four in one night. In February 1945 both men were awarded a bar to their DSO.

After the end of the war in May 1945, Burbridge stayed in the RAF for a further seven months before resigning his commission. He studied at Oxford University and then Cambridge University before entering the Christian ministry. He remained in its service until his retirement. Burbridge resided in Chorleywood in Hertfordshire until his death in November 2016.

== Early life ==
Bransome Arthur Burbridge was born in Brixton, in the London Borough of Lambeth, to Arthur Jarvis and Charlotte ("Lottie") Davis on 4 February 1921. Bransome was the second eldest of five. His brother Jarvis was born in 1919 and three sisters followed over the next 12 years: Charlotte, Zöe and Phebe. Arthur was a follower of Charles Spurgeon and John Wesley thus became a Wesleyan preacher. Bransome was dedicated in the Wesleyan tradition as a child.

The family moved to a larger house in Thicket Road, Penge, Bromley soon after Bransome was born. In mid-1935, Burbridge moved to Knebworth. Burbridge was educated at Alleyne's School in Stevenage where he pursued his interests in music, painting and drama. While there he took part in the light opera, The Pirates of Penzance, by Arthur Sullivan and W. S. Gilbert. Through the influence of his father and aunt, Burbridge adapted his musical and stage skills in Welwyn Evangelical Church where he played the organ at Sunday services. After completing his schooling, Burbridge attended Camberwell Art College, and lodged with a view over The Crystal Palace. His fees were stolen from a hotel room when he stopped in central London and he was forced to drop out after one term. This incident followed another unfortunate event. In 1939, his father suffered a heart attack when he was struck by a crank while trying to start the family car. Arthur Jarvis never recovered and died in 1940.

Bransome was a pacifist and by 1939 his Christian values forbade him from joining the British Armed Forces or any military institution. Burbridge registered as a conscientious objector after the enabling of the National Service (Armed Forces) Act 1939. Bransome was aware objectors had been badly treated in World War I but refused to betray his principles even after the British declaration of war on 3 September 1939, following the German and Soviet invasion of Poland. Instead, Bransome continued in his civilian job at Royal Exchange Assurance Corporation.

In 1939, he created a Young Endeavour group at his local Welwyn Evangelical Church with some initial success. However, he found that as the conflict continued, the group dwindled as men were called up to serve. Women were called up in 1941, but in the meantime Bransome chaired meetings that he described as nothing more than knitting parties. In September 1940, Burbridge ended his objection to military service. After the war, Burbridge explained that he wished to have a positive influence over people his own age, and if he was to continue doing so, he had to enter the armed forces. Burbridge opted for the Royal Air Force (RAF) to serve as a pilot or aircrew. He rationalised that as a pilot he was responsible for shooting down aircraft, not people. Burbridge made his decision despite having shown no interest in flying, nor experience or understanding in the basics of aviation.

== Second World War ==
=== Training to instructor ===
Burbridge applied to join the RAF in September 1940. He was given the non-commissioned officer Service number 10067. The situation for the Allies at that time was bleak. After the conquest of Poland, the German Wehrmacht (Armed Forces) swiftly defeated Allied forces in Norway and France. RAF Fighter Command had prevailed against the Luftwaffe in the Battle of Britain but British cities were suffering in The Blitz—a sustained aerial night offensive against the United Kingdom.

On 24 February 1941 after completing basic flight training at the Elementary Flying Training School (EFTS), Sulhamstead House, in Berkshire, Burbridge flew an aircraft for the first time. Thereafter he trained in the Miles Magister and converted to the twin-engine Airspeed Oxford. In the Oxford he trained in bomb-aimer, navigation, and air gunner exercises. By the spring he had progressed onto the Bristol Blenheim and the versatile Bristol Beaufighter—an effective night fighter. In June 1941 he was transferred to No. 54 Operational Training Unit (OTU) at RAF Church Fenton. Burbridge's skill was recognised and he was appointed as an instructor. Burbridge was also commissioned as Pilot Officer on 1 July 1941. That same day he learned his brother Jarvis had been shot down and was a prisoner of war.

Burbridge was a proficient pilot and undertook night flying training courses. He learned to use the Blind approach beacon system (BABS) which Burbridge surmised as audible dots and dashes. The radar landing system generated dots to one side of the runway and dashes to the other. The strength of these images depended on the accuracy and position of the aircraft as it approached centre-line of the runway. The instructor's view was uninhibited, but the student pilot had his windshield covered to simulate an obstruction. In October 1941, after six months of intensive night flight training, Burbridge was declared ready for front-line operations. Burbridge was posted to No. 85 Squadron RAF at RAF Hunsdon in October 1941. It was a satellite airfield for RAF North Weald in Essex. The squadron's commander was Peter Townsend, an experienced combat leader. 85 Squadron was already a battle-hardened formation and had been in action during World War I and the Battle of Britain in 1940.

The squadron was flying the American-built Douglas Havoc. The aircraft was initially used as a light bomber but was converted to the night fighter role as its limited range prevented from being used in bombing operations over Germany. The machine's nose was equipped with aircraft interception (AI) radar, which required a second crewman to act as a navigator and radar operator. The lack of space meant the operator had to sit 10 feet behind the pilot and communicate through an intercom which was not always reliable. Soon after joining the squadron, the unsuitability of the aircraft as a night fighter became apparent to Burbridge. While coming in to land his aircraft, the entire nose-section fell away nearly striking the landing gear. While the incident led to the nose being strengthened Burbridge found the Havoc to be sluggish and the firepower inadequate for the intended role. There was little Townsend could do. With no replacements or re-equipment in sight, 85 Squadron were to continue operating the Havoc.

In 1942 the Luftwaffe began the so-called "Baedeker Blitz", in retaliation for RAF Bomber Command attacks on German cities. The Luftwaffe bombed Ipswich, Poole and Canterbury on the night of the 2/3 June 1942. Near Canterbury Burbridge claimed his first successes—a probable Junkers Ju 88 over Ipswich—at 03:30 on 2 June 1942. The following night, at 02:50, he damaged a Dornier Do 217 over Canterbury. Burbridge was guided to his targets by ground control interception which placed him within a mile (1.6 km) of the target aircraft. The radio operator guided him with the onboard AI Mk. VIII radar set until the enemy was in visual range. For his service he was promoted to Flying Officer on 1 July 1942.

In August 1942 the squadron began to convert onto the de Havilland Mosquito, a more advanced aircraft with heavier armament of four 20 mm Hispano-Suiza HS.404s cannon and the crew sitting side by side, and dispensed with the ineffective Havocs. On 15 August Burbridge made his first flight in the aircraft with a Sergeant Webster. His first solo flight was on 17 September 1942.

Burbridge's operational tour expired in October 1942 he was posted as an instructor to 62 OTU at RAF Usworth near Sunderland, Tyne and Wear, and then briefly to 141 and 157 Squadrons. While flying from Usworth Burbridge was detailed to instruct at the radar operator's training school. Here students were given instruction and experience on night navigation. Burbridge flew the Avro Anson on these training flights. The aircraft could hold eight students and was equipped with two AI radar screens. The students operated the older AI Mk. IV radar sets which had been relegated to second-line duties. They were observed by a radar operator instructor.

=== Operation Steinbock ===
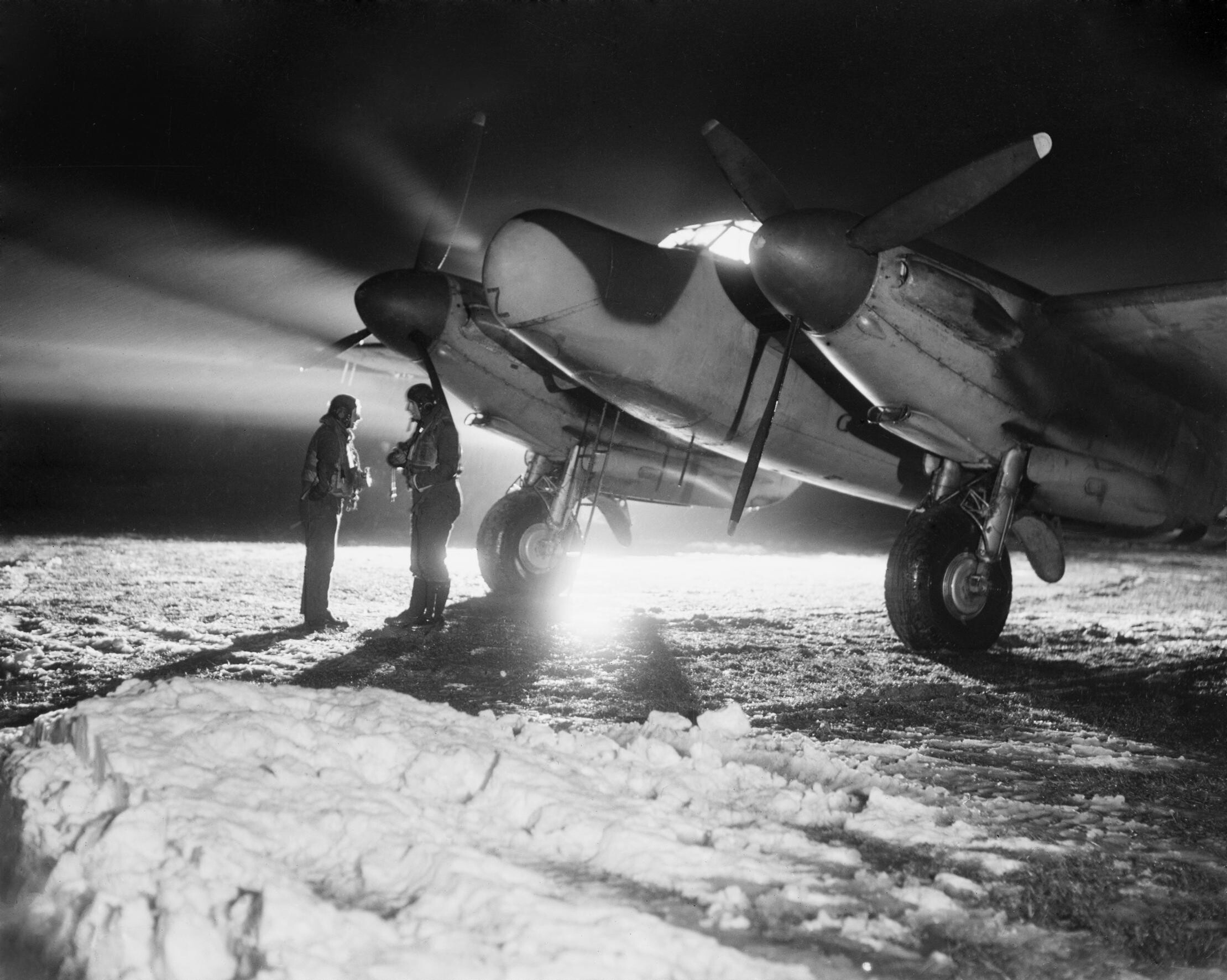
Mosquito NF XII, with the "thimble" nose

At Usworth Burbridge met Flying Officer Bill Skelton, a radar operator instructor. Skelton and Burbridge disliked their positions. Burbridge wished to be assigned to Supermarine Spitfires to carry out high altitude photo-reconnaissance work. Burbridge and Skelton felt that their experience could give them leverage to apply for an operational posting as a night fighter team. Their applications were accepted and Burbridge returned to 85 Squadron at RAF West Malling in July 1943. In line with other promotions, he was elevated to flight lieutenant from 1 July 1943 (war substantive). 85 Squadron was commanded by John "Cat’s Eyes" Cunningham, an experienced night fighter who had been involved in pioneering British night fighter tactics with radar. Cunningham permitted the pair to form as a night fighter crew. Fellow navigator at 85 Squadron, Jimmy Rawnsley, later said the pair flew some of the long-range escort patrols and they got on well personally. Rawnsley said, "They had the perfect and all too rare understanding that characterised the best crews, and which enabled them to work together almost as one man." Rawnsley flew with Cunningham on most of his successful sorties.

In November 1943 Bomber Command was ordered to carry out a sustained attack on Berlin by Air Officer Commanding (AOC) Arthur Harris. The offensive was dubbed the Battle of Berlin, through which Harris was given an opportunity to strike a war-winning blow. In retaliation Adolf Hitler and Hermann Göring, commander in chief of the Luftwaffe, initiated Operation Steinbock. It called for retaliatory attacks on Greater London. The operations were on a much smaller scale than the Blitz in 1940–41, but it required a sizeable defence effort. Burbridge took a Mosquito NF.XII as his personal aircraft. It was equipped with a centimetric low-SHF-band AI Mk VIII. These radar sets were mounted in a solid "bull nose" radome—a smooth nose which did not need external aerials - taking the place of the four 0.303 machine guns of other fighter versions of the Mosquito.

Skelton and Burbridge opened their score on the night of 22/23 February 1944. The Luftwaffe sent 185 aircraft against London, of which 166 reached the target and 13 did not return. Burbridge engaged and destroyed a Messerschmitt Me 410 south-east of Beachy Head this night. According to German records, V./Kampfgeschwader 2 (Bomber Wing 2) were operating the Me 410 from airfields in Vitry-en-Artois, France. Me 410s were used as low-level night fighter bomber intruders to distract the British defences from the heavier bombers. During the night of 24/25 March the Luftwaffe targeted the Westminster area of London; 143 German aircraft took part. Burbridge claimed a Dornier Do 217 damaged and then, after encountering more enemy aircraft off Dover, claimed a Ju 88. Eighteen German bombers were lost to enemy action or failed to return and a further three were lost in accidents. Five Do 217s and 10 Ju 88s were lost in combat.

The next success came during the evening of 18/19 April, south of Sandgate, Kent. The Luftwaffe targeted central London, with Tower Bridge the epicentre of the attack. Burbridge destroyed a Junkers Ju 188, which crashed into the sea. The Germans lost 18 aircraft, including four Ju 188s and nine of the similar Ju 88s. Burbridge reached flying ace status on the 25/26 April, after shooting down a Messerschmitt Me 410 south of Selsey Bill for his 5th victory. It was one of seven German aircraft lost that night. For this act, Burbridge was recommended for the immediate award of the Distinguished Flying Cross (DFC) on 18 May 1944.

Over the course of April, 85 Squadron was moved to No. 100 Group RAF which supported Bomber Command in offensive operations over Europe. For this purpose, 85 Squadron was trained in low-level night navigation and would eventually be equipped with Monica radar to detect enemy aircraft attacking from behind. 85 Squadron was moved to RAF Swannington in Norfolk, a new station that had opened on 1 April 1944.

=== Night fighter intruder ===
The stay in Norfolk was short. 85 Squadron moved to Colerne in Wiltshire, as 100 Group prepared to support Operation Overlord and the D-Day landings which began on 6 June. On the night of 15 June 1944 Burbridge was on patrol over France and Belgium when they sighted a Ju 188 south-west of Nivelles near the border. Burbridge dispatched the aircraft which crashed next to a river. The machine was actually a Ju 88, flown by Major Wilhelm Herget, Gruppenkommandeur (Group Commander) of I./Nachtjagdgeschwader 4 (Night Fighter Wing 4). Herget and his crew bailed out and the Ju 88G was destroyed.

Burbridge scored again on 23 June 1944. The British Army was fighting its way into France from Sword and Gold Beach on 6 June. It was stalled at Caen by determined German resistance, which began a two-month battle for the city. The German bomber force could not operate in daylight because of Allied air supremacy, but the Kampfgeschwader (Bomber Wings) targeted the beachheads and Allied shipping at night. The anti-shipping campaign would prove so ineffective most units were withdrawn in mid-July 1944. By that time the German bomber force was becoming defunct for want of fuel. Near the Channel Burbridge claimed a Ju 88 destroyed, one of eight Mosquito pilot claims on 23/24 June 1944. The victory—their 7th—was not straightforward. At 02:10 they saw a searchlight flash and an aircraft respond with a flare gun. They identified a Ju 88 approaching a landing strip. As they did so the Germans detected the Mosquito and the glare of the light, which caught the Mosquito, blinded them. After evading the searchlight, Skelton used the AI radar to locate the Ju 88. Neither could see the target until they were within 400 feet because of the glaring light. Burbridge fired at the Ju 88 which caught fire, crashed and exploded. Fragments from the Ju 88 damaged the port engine, which was losing coolant. Burbridge feathered it and flew back to England on one engine. The AI radar was also put out of action.

In the late summer of 1944 Burbridge and Skelton also engaged V-1 flying bombs over England. They made their first interception on the night of 18/19 July without success. By September 1944 he had shot down three of the unmanned missiles. In September Bomber Command refocused on Germany after the victory in Normandy, and 85 Squadron continued its support operations. On 11/12 September Bomber Command's No. 5 Group RAF attacked Darmstadt. Other Groups flew "gardening", or mine-laying operations off the German coast while others carried out diversionary raids over Berlin. No. 8 Group RAF attacked synthetic oil plants at Gelsenkirchen and Dortmund. In the far north, Burbridge flew as intruder in support of mine-laying operations. He took a route over southern Denmark, and Skelton identified a Ju 188 over the Baltic Sea which Burbridge shot down. One month later, 85 Squadron supported the attack on Duisburg. Bomber Command dispatched 1,013 aircraft—519 Avro Lancaster, 474 Handley-Page Halifax bombers and 20 Mosquito night fighters—in Operation Hurricane on 14/15 October 1944. Burbridge and Skelton proceeded to Gütersloh airfield in the hope of intercepting German night fighters that attempted to take-off. Within a short time they saw two Ju 88s over the airfield. After a ten-minute chase the first—identified by Skelton through binoculars—was shot down after two firing passes, after AI radar contact had been temporarily lost. The second was dispatched minutes later. Burbridge's score was now 10 enemy aircraft.

Four days later on 19/20 October 1944, Bomber Command attacked Stuttgart. Burbridge and Skelton claimed another Ju 188 over Metz. Next month, Burbridge and Skelton—now becoming well known as the "Night Hawks"—claimed their best single night tally. On 4/5 November 1944, over Bonn, they shot down four enemy aircraft with just 200 rounds of ammunition. They claimed three Ju 88s and a Messerschmitt Bf 110. It would seem their claims were misidentified: two are certain to have been Bf 110s rather than Ju 88s. This sortie increased Burbridge's tally to 15 enemy aircraft. He was awarded the bar to his DFC, which was "Gazetted" on 14 November 1944. It was awarded for reaching his 7th air victory some months earlier. Over Mannheim on 21/22 November 1944 they claimed a Bf 110 and a Ju 88 near Bonn for their 16th and 17th victories. On the night of 12/13 December, Bomber Command attacked Essen and Osnabrück. Burbridge and Skelton accounted for a Bf 110 and Ju 88 outside the city—both victories have been identified through German records. Only six bombers were lost on this mission and all of the 28 Mosquitos dispatched returned.

On 23 December 1944 they added a Bf 110 near Koblenz for Burbridge's 20th victory. His actions on 4/5 November earned him his first Distinguished Service Order (DSO). It was "Gazetted" on 2 January 1945 with his score at 20—he had shot down another five German night fighters in the intervening period. Burbridge's and Skelton's 21st and final victim fell south-west of Ludwigshafen on 2/3 January 1945. The claim was filed as a Ju 88. This victory made them the highest scoring British and Commonwealth night fighter partnership of the war. For this action Burbridge received a bar to his DSO in February 1945 which was Gazetted on 13 March 1945. The citation erred as it mistakenly asserted the award was bestowed for achieving his 20th victory in January 1945.

=== Commanding Officer ===
Burbridge left No. 85 Squadron in March 1945 to become commanding officer of the Night Fighter Leader's School. He was later awarded the American Distinguished Flying Cross on 17 July 1945.

Burbridge said "I always tried to aim for the wings of enemy aircraft and not the cockpit. I never wanted to kill anyone."

== Post war activities ==
Burbridge left the RAF in October 1946 and went to the University of Oxford reading history at St Peter's College and joined the evangelical Oxford Inter-Collegiate Christian Union. He remained a lay preacher for the Scripture Union where he carried out work for the Children's Special Service Mission. While working as a secretary he met Barbara Cooper (b. 6 March 1917), a British national born in Kampala, Uganda. They married on 17 September 1949.

In the 1970s he was a member of the pastoral team at St Aldate's Church, Oxford.

In February 2013 Burbridge's family reported that he was suffering from Alzheimer's disease and they were considering selling his medals and wartime memorabilia to fund his private care home. On 25 March 2013, Burbridge's medals fetched £155,000 at auction.

=== Death ===
Burbridge died on 1 November 2016, aged 95.

== Air victories ==
Chronicle of aerial victories
Can be identified with certainty
Claim No.	Date	Location and time	Enemy aircraft	Notes
1	22 Feb 1944	Off Dungeness at 00:45	Me 410	In the early hours of 22 February 1944 Me 410 U5+CE, Werknummer (WrkNr—Work Number) 20463, from 14./Kampfgeschwader 2 (Bomber Wing 2). Unteroffizier Bernhard Eggers and Obergefreiter Stefan Bednorz killed. This victory has been credited to Squadron leader Caldwell of No. 96 Squadron RAF. A second Me 410 fell near Radnage, Buckinghamshire at 00:45. This machine was also claimed by anti-aircraft artillery. The 16./KG 2 machine code U+?Q, WrkNr unknown, crashed killing Leutnant Felix Müller and Gefreiter Karl-Heinz Borowski.
2		Off Dover at 00:20	Do 217	Some 17 intruder aircraft were lost on this night according to detailed German records—10 were Ju 88s and five were Do 217s. Those Ju 88s whose fate is not known, and whose last known whereabouts was over the Channel, amounted to two. Ju 88, B3+HP, WrkNr 301295, 3/Kampfgeschwader 54, was lost and Oberfeldwebel Ernst Weible, Herbert Hoppstock and Unteroffizier Werner Saupe all missing in action. Ju 88S-1, Z6+HH, WrkNr 370193, of 1./Kampfgeschwader 66, was last reported to be over the Channel, but possibly south of Brighton. One source attributes its loss to Flying Officer E.R Hedgecoe, also of 85 Squadron at 23:23.
3	25 March 1944	Off Dover at 00:52	Ju 88	Four were lost and one damaged; U5+FL, WrkNr 6253 belonging to 2./KG 2 was damaged and Unteroffizier Fritz Lautenschälger was wounded. U5+ML, WrkNr 6358 from 3./KG 2, Leutnant Hans-Günther Hartwig was killed (body recovered), Unteroffizier Leo Eisenkolb, Albert Schilling and Erwin Borehard were all missing. Do 217M-1, U5+PS, WrkNr 6336 from 8./KG 2, Unteroffizier Manfred Graf, Karl-Julius Levacher, Wilhelm Gast and Hauptmann Hans Summer were all posted missing. Do 217M-1, U5+IS, WrkNr 6224, also from 8./KG 2 was lost. Unteroffizier Josef Schremser, Kurt Herrschmann, Lorenz Vogtmann, Josef Zerwas. The remaining loss, 8./KG 2's U5+KS, crashed on takeoff killing Leutnant Walter Gehring.
4	19 April 1944	Off Sandgate at 01:33	Ju 188	German records indicate that 18 aircraft were lost on this night. Four were Ju 188s and nine were similar Ju 88s. According to German records three of the Ju 188s have been attributed to other pilots. The fate of the fourth is not certain. Ju 188E-1, ZG+GK, WrkNr 260361, 2./KG 66 failed to return; Unteroffizier Gerhard Guder, Paul Eichler and Karl Schwaiger were posted missing, as were Obergefreiter Johann Hüffner and Hans Schmid.
5	26 April 1944	Portsmouth at 05:07	Me 410	Six German aircraft fell this night. Two were Me 410s. Burbridge's victim has been identified as belonging to 1(F)/121 (Aufklärungsgruppe 121). Oberleutnant Hermann Kroll was killed. Kroll's body was recovered by the Royal Navy and buried at sea. Oberfahn Werner Meyer was made prisoner of war.
6	15 June 1944		Ju 188	Claimed south-west of Nivelles. Although claimed as a Ju 188 it was in fact a similar Ju 88G-1. This aircraft was flown by the most notable of Burbridge's victims. Gruppenkommandeur (Group Commander) of Nachtjagdgeschwader 4 (Night Fighter Wing 4), Major Wilhelm Herget, a night pilot with 73 aerial victories (58 at night), was shot down and parachuted to safety with his crew—Oberfeldwebel Hans Liebherr, Feldwebel Emil Gröss. The aircraft, WerkNr 710833, crashed near Pont-à-Celles, North of Charleroi. Excavation of the Ju 88 began in 2008.
7	23 June 1944		Ju 88	Over English Channel.
8	11/12 September 1944	Baltic Sea	Ju 188	The Ju 88G-1 Werk Nr 710579 of 6./NJG 3 was flown by Unteroffizier Gerhard Schmitz. The Ju 88 crashed on a farm near Hojme, west of Odense, Denmark. Schmitz baled out but broke a leg upon landing. His gunner baled out without injury. His radar operator, Unteroffizier Heinrich Heckmann, was found near the crash site severely wounded. He was taken to hospital but died the same day. Another source states the victim may have been Ju 88 Wrk Nr 712195, D9+BH, from II./Nachtjagdgeschwader 7. The machine was probably operating from Copenhagen Airport, near Kastrup.
9—10	15 October 1944	Gütersloh airfield	Two Ju 88s	One of his victims was a Ju 88G-1 of Stab (Command staffel) III./Nachtjagdgeschwader 2. Leutnant Ernst Hoevermann and crew killed.
11	19 October 1944	Near Metz	Ju 188	Details unknown. Ju 88G-1, Werk Nr 714453, 2Z+EP, from 6./NJG 6, was lost nearby. Leutnant Otto Drähne, Unteroffizier Hugo Knoblich, Gefreiter Hans Grothe, Oberfeldwebel Erich Heuermann were all killed. The site of the wreck was Saint-Avold, west of Metz.
12—15	5 November 1944	30 miles south of Bonn; 5 miles south east of Bonn north of Hangelar.	Three Ju 88s Bf 110	Two of his victims were Bf 110s, and misidentified as Ju 88s. One, belonging to 6 staffel (Squadron) II./Nachtjagdgeschwader 1, crashed into the River Rhine, north of Hangelar airfield. Oberleutnant Ernst Runzel was killed. Radio operator and gunner Obergefreiter Karl-Heinz Bendfield bailed out. The second Bf 110 was piloted by Unteroffizier Gustav Sarzio wounded in action, gunner and radio operator killed. The Bf 110G from 6./Nachtjagdgeschwader 3, WrkNr 710579, was destroyed. Sarzio was a night fighter with five aerial victories. His last claim was an Avro Lancaster on the night of the 12/13 August 1944.
16—17	22 November 1944	South of Mannheim	Ju 88; Bf 110	Bf 110G-4 Wrk Nr 180527, 2Z+BL of 3./NJG 6 was destroyed at Bönnigheim; pilot Feldwebel Walter Schneider and Obergefreiter Erwin Rieger killed. According to the source, it was weather-related.
18 & 19	13 December 1944	Two miles west of Essen.	Ju 88; Bf 110	Ju 88, Wrk Nr 714530 of 6./NJG 4. Pilot Unteroffizier Heinrich Brune, radio operator Emil Hoffharth and gunner Wolfgang Rautert were killed. Bf 110G-4, G9+RT, of 9./NJG 1. Unteroffizier Rudolf Wilsch and his crew baled out. This victory was recorded on Burbridge's gun camera.
20	23 December 1944	Near Koblenz.	Bf 110	Loss unknown. Pilots from Nachtjagdgeschwader 5, 4 and 6 were operating this night—crews from NJG 5 and 6 made claims. According to one source, Ju 88G-1, C3+EM, Wrk Nr 714045, was the only loss this night. Kurt Hülfert, Unteroffizier Gerhard Richter and Gefreiter Theophil Weinrich from 4./NJG were killed. Leutnant Clemens Ostrowitzki of 1./NJG 6 was killed near Bad Kreuznach, south of Ludwigshafen. The Bf 110G-4 Wrk Nr 140678, 2Z+ZH, was destroyed. Radio operator Gefreiter Kloth survived and gunner Unteroffizier Wenzel Nosko was wounded. This loss is credited to another 58 Squadron pilot—Flight Lieutenant G. C. Chapman and J. Stockley.
21	2/3 January 1945	15 miles south-west of Ludwigshafen	Ju 88	Details unknown. Oberleutnant Jacobs crashed nearby at Odenheim. Navigator Feldwebel Karl Vogelhuber and Obergefreiter Helmuth Pieper escaped by parachute. Radio operator Unteroffizier Günter Ferth was killed. The Ju 88G-6, Wrk Nr, 620403, 2Z+FK was from II./NJG 6.
