= Jimmy Rawnsley =

English Royal Air Force flight lieutenant (1904–65)

Flight Lieutenant Cecil Frederick Rawnsley DSO DFC DFM
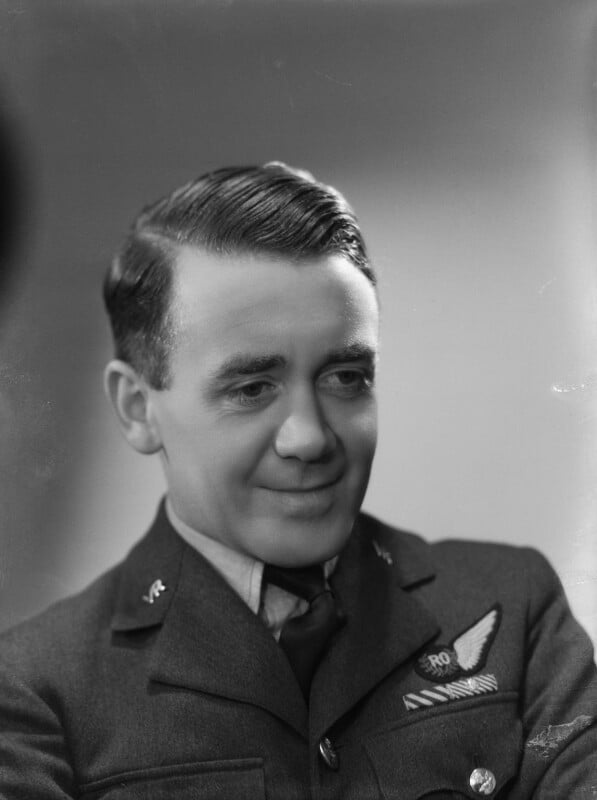
- Rawnsley in 1942
- Born: 16 March 1904; West Kensington, London, England
- Died: 12 February 1965 (aged 60); Chichester, Sussex, England
- Military career
- Allegiance: United Kingdom
- Branch: Royal Air Force
- Rank: Flight Lieutenant
- Nickname: Jimmy
- Service number: 102089
- Units: No. 604 Squadron RAF; No. 85 Squadron RAF
- Conflicts: Second World War: Battle of Britain; Channel Front
- Awards: Distinguished Service Order; Distinguished Flying Cross; Distinguished Flying Medal & Bar; Distinguished Flying Cross (United States)
- Other work: Author of Night Fighter

Flight Lieutenant Cecil Frederick "Jimmy" Rawnsley DSO, DFC, DFM & Bar (16 March 1904 – 12 February 1965) was a Royal Air Force night fighter observer radar operator and gunner during the Second World War. He flew many of his sorties with John "Cat's Eyes" Cunningham who was credited with 20 kills, of which 19 were claimed at night, and 17 of which were achieved with Rawnsley.

== Second World War ==
Rawnsley initially served as an air-gunner but retrained to become a navigator/radar operator and was sent to No. 604 Squadron RAF flying Beaufighters. Using the new aircraft interception (AI) radar equipment (an early form of airborne radar). Using this tracking device at night, Rawnsley was able to guide Cunningham onto targets. Their first confirmed "kill" came on the night of 19–20 November 1940, when they downed a German Junkers Ju 88 bomber over Oxfordshire.

On 4 April 1941 he was awarded a Distinguished Flying Medal (DFM), to which he added a Bar on 23 May of the same year. Later that year, he was awarded the Distinguished Flying Cross (DFC), on 19 September 1941.

In January 1943, Rawnsley transferred to No. 85 Squadron RAF along with Cunningham. They now flew a Mosquito and within the year had downed four more enemy aircraft. On the 26 October 1943, after flying over 200 sorties with Cunningham and having been his radar operator during the downing of 17 enemy planes he was awarded a Distinguished Service Order (DSO).

== Memoir ==
In 1957 Rawnsley published (with Robert Wright) a memoir detailing his wartime career in the book Night Fighter. Covering his partnership with Cunningham, it gives a clear insight into the methods the pair used to find and down enemy aircraft.

== Medals and awards ==
- 4 April 1941 – Sergeant Cecil Frederick Rawnsley, Auxiliary Air Force, No. 604 Squadron is awarded the Distinguished Flying Medal in recognition of gallantry displayed in flying operations against the enemy:

Sergeant Rawnsley has shown great keenness both as an air gunner and radio operator and has materially assisted his pilot to destroy two enemy aircraft.

— London Gazette

- 23 May 1941 – Sergeant Cecil Frederick Rawnsley, DFM (804251), Auxiliary Air Force, No. 604 Squadron is awarded a Bar to his Distinguished Flying Medal in recognition of gallantry displayed in flying operations against the enemy:

This airman has continued to display the greatest ability and efficiency as wireless operator. He has assisted his pilot in the destruction of at least 7 enemy aircraft. He has been a splendid inspiration to his fellow operators.

— London Gazette

- 19 September 1941 – Pilot Officer Cecil Frederick Rawnsley, DFM, No. 604 Squadron, is awarded the Distinguished Flying Cross for gallantry displayed in flying operations against the enemy.
- 26 October 1943 – Flight Lieutenant Cecil Frederick Rawnsley, DFC, DFM (102089) Royal Air Force Volunteer Reserve, No. 85 Squadron is awarded the Distinguished Service Order in recognition of gallantry displayed in flying operations against the enemy:

As observer, Flight Lieutenant Rawnsley has participated in more than 200 sorties and his brilliant work is beyond praise. He has assisted in the destruction of 17 enemy aircraft, 16 of them at night. In addition to his work in the Air, Flight Lieutenant Rawnsley has devoted much service towards the training of other members of aircraft and his efforts have been attended with excellent results. Flight Lieutenant Rawnsley has rendered invaluable service.

— London Gazette

- 1946 Distinguished Flying Cross (United States)

== Bibliography ==
- Golley, John (1999). John 'Cat's-Eyes' Cunningham: The Aviation Legend. Shrewsbury: Airlife Publishing. ISBN 1-84037-059-9.
