= No. 604 Squadron RAuxAF =

Defunct flying squadron of the Royal Air Force

No. 604 (County of Middlesex) Squadron RAuxAF
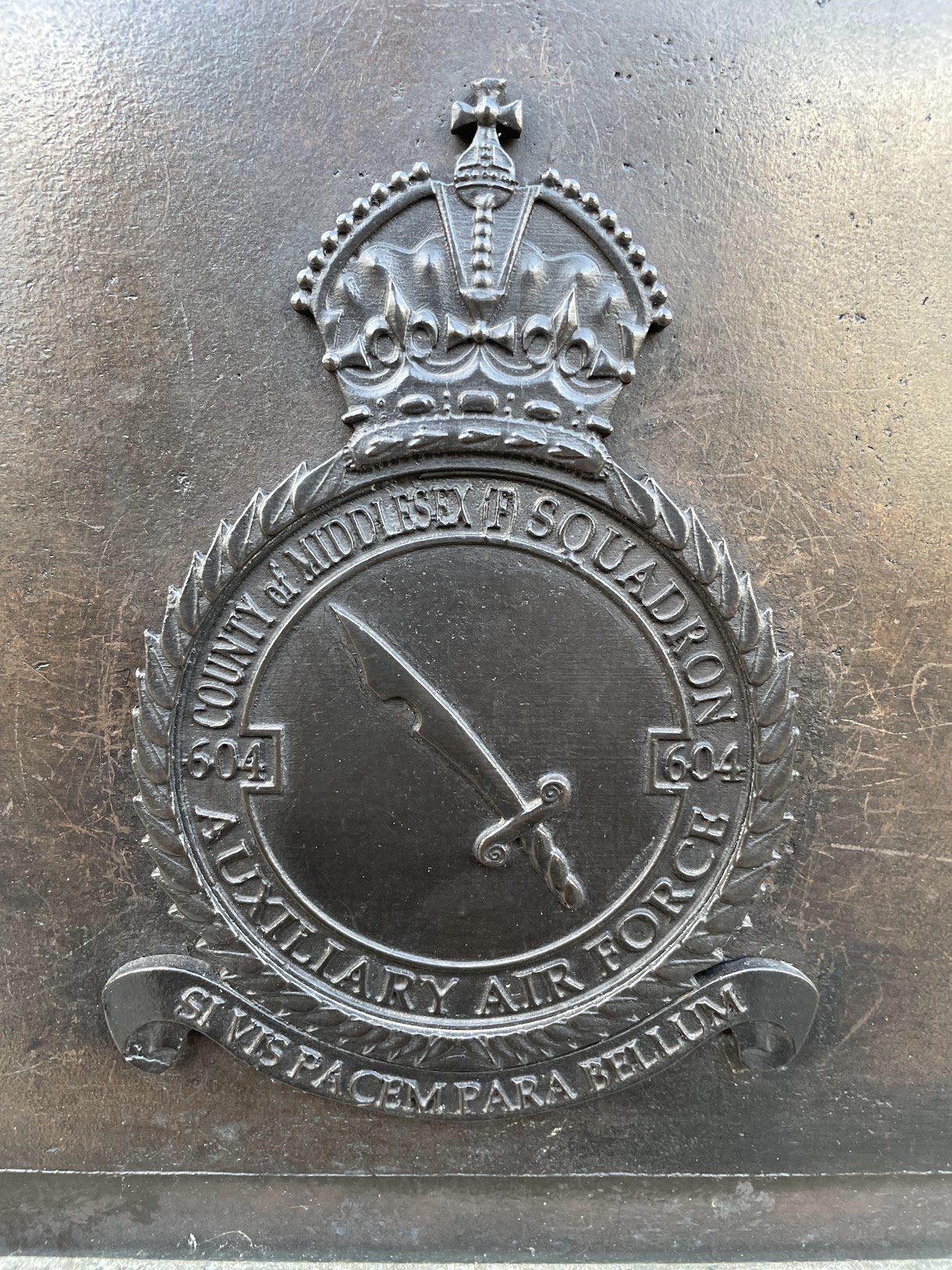
- The squadron's heraldic badge displayed on the Battle of Britain Monument in London
- Active: 17 March 1930 – 18 April 1945; 10 May 1946 – 10 March 1957
- Country: UK
- Branch: Royal Air Force
- Part of: Royal Auxiliary Air Force
- Nickname: County of Middlesex
- Mottos: Latin: Si vis pacem para bellum (Translation: "If you want peace, prepare for war")
- Post-1951 aircraft insignia
- Battle honours: France and Low Countries (1940); Dunkirk (1940); Battle of Britain (1940); Home Defence (1940–44); Fortress Europe (1943–45); Normandy (1944); France and Germany (1944–45)

Commanders
- Honorary Air Commodore: Samuel Hoare, 1st Viscount Templewood (1932–1957)
- Notable commanders: John Cunningham, Michael Hugh Constable-Maxwell, Frederick Desmond Hughes

Insignia
- Squadron badge heraldry: A seax No. 604 Squadron, being the County of Middlesex squadron, took part of the armorial bearings of the county, a seax, to commemorate that association
- Identification symbol: WQ (Jan 1939 – Sep 1939); NG Sep (1939 – Apr 1945, 1949 – Apr 1951); RAK (Jul 1946 – 1949)

No. 604 Squadron RAF was a squadron of the Royal Air Force noted for its pioneering role the development of radar-controlled night-fighter operations. The squadron was established in March 1930 at RAF Hendon as a day-bomber squadron of the Royal Auxiliary Air Force. In July 1934, the squadron transitioned to two-seat fighters. Shortly after the commencement of World War II in 1939, the squadron was reassigned to a night-fighter role.

No. 604 Squadron was initially disbanded in April 1945 as part of a reduction of the British Armed Forces near the end of the war. It was reformed as an auxiliary single-seat fighter squadron in May 1946, again at RAF Hendon. Final disbandment occurred in March 1957 with the dissolution of the Auxiliary Air Force.

== History ==
=== Formation and early years ===
No. 604 Squadron was established on 17 March 1930 at RAF Hendon as a squadron of the Royal Auxiliary Air Force. The squadron was initially assigned to the role of day-bombing and received its first aircraft (Airco DH.9As) in April 1930. The DH.9A was soon replaced by the Westland Wapiti in September 1930. Upon re-designation as a two-seat fighter squadron, No. 604 transitioned to the Hawker Hart on 23 July 1934. Hawker Demons replaced the Harts in June 1935.

=== World War II ===
In early 1939 the squadron transitioned to the long-range fighter variant of the Bristol Blenheim. No. 604 Squadron was activated on 24 August 1939 to operate long-range fighters from RAF North Weald. The squadron spent the first several months of World War II flying defensive patrols in support of coastal convoys.

The squadron was reassigned to a night-fighter role in late 1939 and was relocated to RAF Northolt in January 1940. By May 1940, the squadron had moved to RAF Manston. During the squadron's stay at RAF Manston that Flying Officer Alistair Hunter and Sergeant Gordon Thomas shot down a Luftwaffe Heinkel 115 floatplane shortly after midnight on 18 June 1940, during the first major night raid over the United Kingdom. Following the Dunkirk evacuation, the squadron was based at RAF Middle Wallop at the end of July 1940.

In early summer 1940, squadron aircraft were fitted with VHF radiotelephone equipment and Mark III aircraft interception (AI) radar. The former was part of RAF Fighter Command policy, and greatly improved air-to-air and air-to ground communication. The AI radar equipment was fitted to assist the night fighter crews in locating German bombers at night. A new technological development, AI was not particularly reliable at this stage, and needed a third crew member to operate. The external antennas slowed down aircraft that were already considered of low performance for their role. Most AI operators were inexperienced and were forced to learn on the job, translating the information provided on the AI screens into instructions to enable their pilot to get close enough to visually locate and shoot down an enemy bomber.

Late in September 1940 the squadron received its first Bristol Beaufighter, equipped with four 20-mm Hispano-Suiza HS.404 cannon under the nose and improved Mark IV AI radio-location equipment. As one of the few squadrons thus equipped, 604 Squadron provided night defence over the UK during the Blitz from late 1940 until mid May 1941, when most Luftwaffe bomber units departed for involvement in the invasion of Russia. By this time 50 air victories had been claimed by the squadron—fourteen by F/L John Cunningham.

In early 1943 the squadron began to switch over to night intruder operations. In February 1944, the squadron was allocated to the 2nd Tactical Air Force and began conversion to the de Havilland Mosquito. Operations from Normandy began in August but the following month the unit returned to the UK, returning to the continent once again in January 1945. They remained there until disbanding at B.51 at Vendeville, near Lille, France, on 18 April 1945. Some 127 air victories had been claimed by the Squadron during the war, 41 since May 1944. A notable member of the squadron, later awarded a posthumous George Cross, was John Quinton DFC.

=== Post-war ===
With the reactivation of the Royal Auxiliary Air Force, 604 Squadron was reformed on 10 May 1946 at RAF Hendon as a day fighter squadron. It was initially equipped with Spitfire LF.16s but converted to jets in November 1949 when de Havilland Vampires arrived. These were replaced by Gloster Meteors in August 1952 but this was only for a few years as the squadron was disbanded on 10 March 1957, along with all the flying units of the Royal Auxiliary Air Force.

== Aircraft operated ==
Aircraft operated by No. 604 squadron RAF
From	To	Aircraft	Version
April 1930	September 1930	Airco DH.9A	
June 1930	June 1935	Westland Wapiti	Mk.IIa
September 1934	June 1935	Hawker Hart	
June 1935	January 1939	Hawker Demon	
January 1939	January 1941	Bristol Blenheim	Mk.If
May 1940	May 1940	Gloster Gladiator	Mk.I
September 1940	April 1943	Bristol Beaufighter	Mk.I
April 1943	April 1944	Bristol Beaufighter	Mk.VIf
February 1944	September 1944	de Havilland Mosquito	Mk.XII
April 1944	April 1945	de Havilland Mosquito	Mk.XIII
October 1946	May 1950	Supermarine Spitfire	LF.16e
November 1949	September 1952	de Havilland Vampire	F.3
August 1952	March 1957	Gloster Meteor	F.8

== Squadron bases ==
Bases and airfields used by No. 604 Squadron RAF
From	To	Base
17 March 1930	29 September 1938	RAF Hendon, Middlesex
29 September 1938	3 October 1938	RAF North Weald, Essex
3 October 1938	2 September 1939	RAF Hendon, Middlesex
2 September 1939	16 January 1940	RAF North Weald, Essex (det. at RAF Martlesham Heath, Suffolk)
16 January 1940	15 May 1940	RAF Northolt, Middlesex
15 May 1940	20 June 1940	RAF Manston, Kent
20 June 1940	3 July 1940	RAF Northolt, Middlesex
3 July 1940	27 July 1940	RAF Gravesend, Kent
27 July 1940	12 August 1942	RAF Middle Wallop, Hampshire (Det. at RAF Coltishall, Norfolk)
12 August 1942	23 August 1942	RAF Warmwell, Dorset
23 August 1942	7 December 1942	RAF Middle Wallop, Hampshire
7 December 1942	18 February 1943	RAF Predannack, Cornwall
18 February 1943	24 April 1943	RAF Ford, West Sussex
24 April 1943	25 April 1944	RAF Scorton, North Yorkshire
25 April 1944	3 May 1944	RAF Church Fenton, North Yorkshire
3 May 1944	13 July 1944	RAF Hurn, Dorset
13 July 1944	25 July 1944	RAF Colerne, Wiltshire
25 July 1944	28 July 1944	RAF Zeals, Wiltshire
28 July 1944	6 August 1944	RAF Colerne, Wiltshire (Det. at A.15/Maupertus, France)
6 August 1944	9 September 1944	A.8/Picauville, France
9 September 1944	24 September 1944	B.17/Carpiquet, France
24 September 1944	5 December 1944	RAF Predannack, Cornwall
5 December 1944	31 December 1944	RAF Odiham, Hampshire
31 December 1944	18 April 1945	B.51/Lille-Vendeville, France
10 May 1946	28 March 1949	RAF Hendon, Middlesex
28 March 1949	10 March 1957	RAF North Weald, Essex

== Commanding officers ==
Officers commanding No. 604 Squadron RAF
From	To	Name
March 1930	March 1935	W/Cdr. A.S.W. Dore, DSO, TD
March 1935	January 1939	S/Ldr. C.P. Gabriel
January 1939	March 1940	S/Ldr. R.A. Budd
March 1940	August 1941	S/Ldr. M.F. Anderson
August 1941	August 1941	W/Cdr. Charles Henry Appleton (1906–1944)
August 1941	July 1942	W/Cdr. J. Cunningham, DSO & Bar, DFC
July 1942	April 1943	W/Cdr. Wood, AFC
April 1943	July 1944	W/Cdr. M.H. Constable-Maxwell, DFC
July 1944	18 April 1945	W/Cdr. F.D. Hughes, DFC & 2 Bars
June 1946	January 1948	W/Cdr. J. Cunningham, DSO & 2 Bars, DFC & Bar
January 1948	May 1951	S/Ldr. K.T. Lofts, DFC & Bar
May 1951	September 1953	S/Ldr. A. Deytrikh
September 1953	March 1957	S/Ldr. T.P. Turnbull, DFC
