= John Cunningham (RAF officer) =

British Royal Air Force night fighter ace

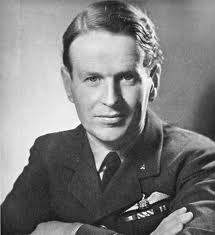
- Wing Commander John Cunningham, 1942
- Born: 27 July 1917; Croydon, Surrey, England
- Died: 21 July 2002 (aged 84); Welwyn Garden City, Hertfordshire, England
- Military career
- Allegiance: United Kingdom
- Branch: Royal Air Force (RAF); Royal Auxiliary Air Force (RAuxAF)
- Service years: 1936–1967
- Rank: Group captain
- Nickname: Cat's Eyes
- Unit: No. 604 Squadron RAF
- Commands: No. 85 Squadron RAF
- Conflicts: Second World War
- Awards: Commander of the Order of the British Empire; Distinguished Service Order, two bars; Distinguished Flying Cross & bar; Mentioned in Despatches; Air Efficiency Award; Silver Star (United States); Order of the Patriotic War, 1st Class (USSR)

John 'Cat's Eyes' Cunningham CBE, DSO & Two Bars, DFC & Bar, AE (27 July 1917 – 21 July 2002) was a Royal Air Force (RAF) night fighter ace during the Second World War and a test pilot. During the war, he was nicknamed 'Cat's Eyes' by the British press to explain his success and to avoid communicating the existence of airborne radar to the Germans.

Cunningham was born near Croydon Airport, London's main aerodrome. As a teenager, he was keen on entering the aviation industry. Temporarily abiding by his father's wishes for him to avoid the military, he approached the de Havilland company, and was accepted as an engineering candidate. Concurrently, he joined the Royal Auxiliary Air Force (RAuxAF) and became a member of 604 (County of Middlesex) Squadron. Cunningham began his training in August 1935, flew solo in March 1936 and received his wings in 1937. He became an established test pilot, gaining considerable flying time on different aircraft.

In August 1939, Cunningham rejoined his squadron, now equipped with a version of the Bristol Blenheim. His observer was Jimmy Rawnsley, who would serve as his gunner and radio operator for most of the war and contribute to all but three of his victories. In July 1940, the squadron was converted to a specialist night fighter unit, and was one of the first to receive aircraft interception (AI) radar. Cunningham was promoted to squadron leader (Sqn Ldr) in September 1940.

On the night of 19 November 1940, Cunningham claimed his first victory. By the time the Blitz had ended in June 1941, he had destroyed thirteen enemy aircraft and claimed three as probable victories and two damaged. After a long rest, he was promoted to wing commander (Wg Cdr) in 1942. He was also appointed to command 85 Squadron, by which time, his tally had reached sixteen enemy aircraft destroyed. In 1943 and early 1944, he added a further four victories, one probable and one damaged. Cunningham's combat career ended with twenty aerial victories, three probables and six damaged. He spent the remainder of the conflict in various staff officer positions. By the end of the war in Europe in May 1945, he had attained the rank of group captain (Gp Cpt).

After the war, Cunningham rejoined de Havilland and continued his test pilot career. He flew the world's first jet airliner, the de Havilland Comet, in 1949. He then flew commercial jets for a time in the early 1960s and continued flying in the industry until the late 1970s. He also worked for British Aerospace (BAe) as executive director, retiring in 1980. In recognition of his wartime exploits and his contribution to civil aviation, he was appointed a CBE.

== Early life ==
John Cunningham was born in Croydon in south London on 27 July 1917. His father, Arthur Gillespie Cunningham, worked for the Dunlop Rubber Company at Fort Dunlop in Birmingham, and rose to the position of company secretary. In 1910, Arthur Cunningham married Evelyn Mary Spencer. Her family owned an engineering company in Coventry which supplied heavy machinery to the fabric and textiles company Courtaulds. In the 1920s, her grandfather was Mayor of Coventry. The family moved to Croydon. Cunningham had two elder sisters, Mary and Janet, and a younger brother, William. John attended Bowden House School, a preparatory school at Seaford, East Sussex until he was nine years of age. He was subsequently a pupil at Whitgift School, a public school in Croydon. In 1926, on a school holiday, he took a flight in an Avro 504. His experiences encouraged him to enter the officer's training corps at the school. A personal tragedy occurred in 1930 when his father died. Still, Cunningham did well at school, particularly in mathematics. As a teenager, he was keen on entering the aviation industry.

=== de Havilland apprenticeship ===
At 18, he joined the de Havilland Aircraft company in 1935 as an apprentice. Cunningham began his engineering career with some menial projects, before being invited to assist with the building of the de Havilland T.K.2 and de Havilland Moth Minor. At the same time, he joined the Royal Auxiliary Air Force (RAuxAF), a part-time branch of the Royal Air Force (RAF), and became a member of No. 604 (County of Middlesex) Squadron after a recommendation by a friend of the family. Cunningham began his pilot training at Hatfield Aerodrome in August 1935, and flew solo on 15 March 1936, receiving his commission as a pilot officer (PO) on 7 May 1936.

He was awarded his wings in the summer of 1936. This was when he met Cecil F. 'Jimmy' Rawnsley, a 32-year-old electrical engineer who would later serve as air gunner and radar operator on all but three of his successful air battles. Cunningham later became a junior test pilot with de Havilland, working with light aircraft with Geoffrey de Havilland, the company founder's son and chief test pilot. The company was short of test pilots, and Cunningham caught de Havilland's eye as his flight experience grew. It was reflected by his promotion to flying officer (FO) on 5 December 1937. At this time, he began to care more for test-flying than manufacturing and design. He became one of de Havilland's four top test pilots.

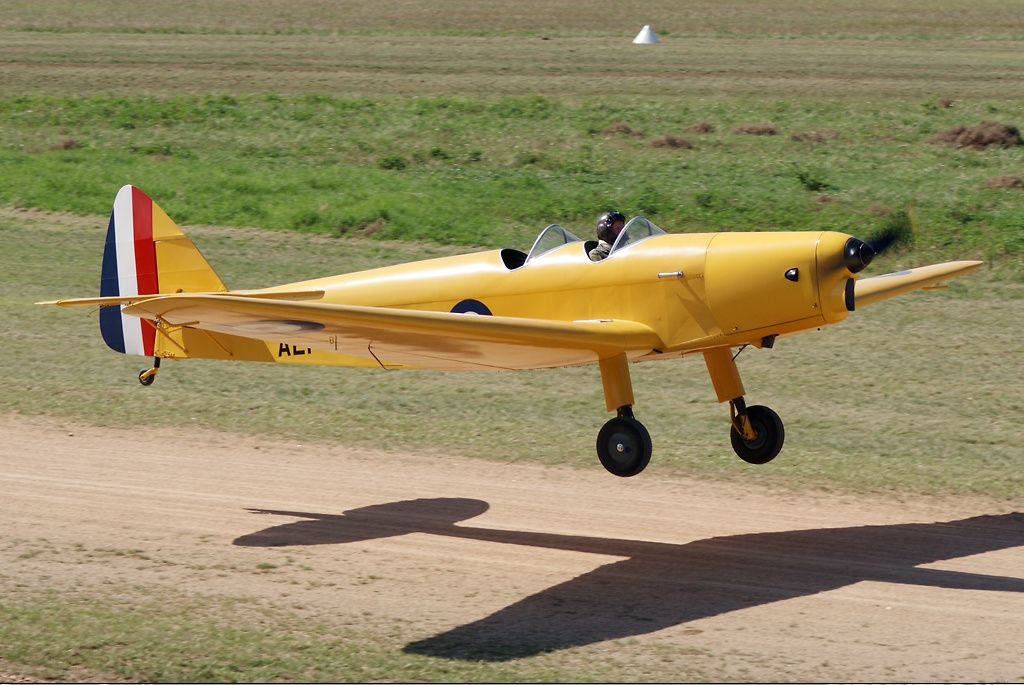
A de Havilland Moth Minor

In March 1938, he was called to readiness with 604 Squadron during the Munich crisis. At this time, the squadron was flying the Hawker Demon. He was displeased when they converted to the Bristol Blenheim. The machines were fitted with a tray of four 303 Browning machine guns to give forward-facing firepower. As a long-range fighter it was of dubious value. The German Messerschmitt Bf 109 and Messerschmitt Bf 110 could, and would, expose the frailties of the aircraft, which was originally intended as a bomber. However, Cunningham was told by the Air Ministry that it would be sufficient in the night fighter role, which is where they intended to use this variant. On 20 April 1938, he returned to de Havilland, test-flying de Havilland Moth Minors.

On 11 April 1939, he and Geoffrey de Havilland, narrowly escaped with their lives, both men parachuting to safety. They had taken a de Havilland Moth Minor into the air to test its response to spins. The prototypes had had an anti-spin parachute, but preceding tests had been carried out without needing to resort to it. Geoffrey put the aircraft into a left-hand spin, which was recovered. After climbing back to 8,000 feet (2,400 metres), the aircraft was put into a right-hand spin. The engine cut out, the nose reared up, and the aircraft stalled and entered a flat spin. When de Havilland's recovery efforts failed, both decided to bail out. Once they had done so, the lightened Moth lowered its nose and recovered from the spin. The engine ignition had been left on, and the wind-milling propeller started the engine. The aircraft began circling the descending airmen at dangerously close range. Fortunately, it descended at a faster rate than their parachutes did, and it was destroyed when it hit the ground. Cunningham casually took pictures of the wreckage and his parachute, which exemplified his cool nature.

After the Nazi–Soviet pact on 23 August 1939, the Royal Air Force (RAF) mobilized. Cunningham had been test-flying the de Havilland Dragon airliner. Only sixteen were completed before the declaration of war in September. At this juncture, Cunningham had to choose between de Havilland or to the RAF. The RAF had trained him, and he felt he could be of far more use in the RAF than test-flying aircraft.

== Second World War ==
In August 1939, Cunningham rejoined his squadron, which had been equipped with a version of the Blenheim. He was not enthusiastic about the aircraft; the turret had been removed to reduce weight and increase speed, but the flying suits and cockpit were not heated, which made winter flying an ordeal. The radios were too short in range, which caused communication problems. The Blenheim's cockpit windshield was made up of several panes and was difficult to clean. It was also liable to reflect light, which made cooperation with searchlights hazardous and problems were encountered with blind-flying instruments. The squadron suffered losses owing to the inexperience of crews flying patrols over the North Sea from RAF North Weald in Essex; a number of them a result of the difficulties with the aircraft. In January 1940, 604 Squadron moved to RAF Northolt and flew Blenheims adorned with the Finnish Air Force's blue swastika to Finland via Sweden to assist the country after the Soviet invasion.

Cunningham was promoted to flight lieutenant (Flt Lt) on 12 March 1940. In April, the squadron flew as escort for a de Havilland Flamingo carrying Winston Churchill, First Lord of the Admiralty, to Paris, to attend a meeting after Operation Weserübung, the German invasion of Denmark and Norway. Most of the unit's time during the Phoney War was spent in intensive training over The Wash, which included co-operation with searchlights and mine-laying operations. On 15 May, 604 relocated to RAF Manston. From this airfield, Cunningham flew sorties over the English Channel and patrols over Dunkirk during the Battle for France. Cunningham made no recorded contact with the Luftwaffe and France capitulated on 25 June.

=== Night fighter squadron ===
On 26 July 1940, the squadron was made a specialist night fighter (NF) unit. The squadron was amongst the first to receive aircraft interception (AI) radar. 604 Squadron was sent a number of AI Mk. IV radar sets. Jimmy Rawnsley, Cunningham's friend and crew-mate, saw this as an opportunity to join a programme that promised a bright future. Rawnsley retrained as a radar operator and re-joined Cunningham in January 1941. In the intervening period, the squadron was frequently frustrated by the Blenheim's limitations. Even with the 'magic boxes', they were too slow to catch any of the German bombers if they were given the slightest advantage. Cunningham flew with 604 on the night of 18/19 June when the Luftwaffe flew its first big operation in the Greater London area. No victories were claimed in the summer of 1940.

Cunningham was promoted to acting squadron leader (Sqn Ldr) in September 1940, commanding B Flight. Within the month, the unit received the heavily armed and powerful Bristol Beaufighter. After the commanding officer, Cunningham was the second man to fly it. The Beaufighter went through teething troubles in relation to its gun sight. The sight projected a ring of light with a spot at the centre onto a small sheet of glass directly in front of the pilot's head. The spot in the centre provided the aiming point, and the ring, of variable diameter, helped him to judge the range and amount of deflection needed to attack a target. The light's brilliance was adjustable by rheostat, but the control was ineffective. Rotating it a fraction could produce maximum brilliance or cause the spot to flicker out.

Air marshal Sholto Douglas formed the Night Fighting Committee, and met regularly at RAF Bentley Priory to discuss operational problems. As an experienced aviator, Cunningham was invited to attend. Henry Tizard invited Cunningham to air his views at the meeting. Tizard referred him to the Royal Aircraft Establishment (RAE) to meet Arnold Hall, a gun sight expert. With his engineering expertise, and Cunningham's assessment of the issue, Hall ironed out the inadequacies in the design. Hall later became Cunningham's managing director at Hawker Siddeley twenty years later. Cunningham also worked with Ground-controlled interception (GCI), carrying out various exercises. He made the acquaintance of Philip Joubert de la Ferté, Chief of the Air Staff (CAS), who dropped in on 604 as well as Douglas; the two men were always keen to hear the experiences of the crew.

The AI sets added to Beaufighters were the first to be mass-produced. The operating frequency was 190 to 195 MHz, with a wavelength of 1.5 m (4 ft 11 in). The equipment consisted of a receiver, transmitter, control panel, modulator, indicator unit, and a system of fixed dipole aerials. On the nose, the aerial was a double arrowhead shape with a pair of azimuth aerials protruding above and below the leading edge of each wing between the guns and the wingtip. A pair of elevation aerials were above and below the wing surfaces near the RAF roundel on the starboard side. The indicator display consisted of two cathode-ray tubes. They displayed elevation and azimuth bearing. The set had a range-limitation of 4 mi (21,000 ft; 6,400 m). The minimum range of detection was usually around 400 feet (120 metres). At closer ranges, the target merged with the transmission pulse and was obscured. At altitudes below 1,000 feet (300 metres), the returns from ground objects would swamp the tubes. Operators like Rawnsley were left to do a fair amount of guesswork. No scales or calibration markings were put on early sets. The position and heading of the enemy in the azimuth plane, its height, and its range had to be guessed. At least the GCI could bring the Beaufighter well within range of the target, usually a 1 mi (1.6 km) or so behind the bomber.

The Cunningham–Rawnsley team used the AI to position themselves directly astern and underneath the target. Although the German bombers carried a dorsal gunner, it was difficult to locate an enemy against the black colour of the landscape. Usually, the blackness of the country would swallow up the outline of an approaching night fighter. Approaching from slightly below allowed Cunningham to avoid the slipstream. These tactics allowed Cunningham to close the range and fire first, which was usually sufficient to end the engagement quickly and successfully. Bob Braham, another night fighter ace, also used this tactic.

=== 'Cat's Eyes' ===
Throughout the summer of 1940, Cunningham and 604 Squadron had to sit idle and frustrated as the Battle of Britain raged. By autumn, the battle had subsided. Having failed to gain air superiority, the Luftwaffe now resolved to bomb British ports and industries. This change in German strategy began The Blitz phase of the aerial campaign. On the night of 19/20 November 1940, the Luftwaffe raided Birmingham. The Germans hoped to follow up their attacks on the West Midlands after a highly effective raid against Coventry on 14 November 1940. Pathfinders from Kampfgruppe 100 (Battle Group 100) led 369 aircraft from Kampfgeschwader 26 (KG 26, Bomber Wing 26), Kampfgeschwader 54 (KG 54), and Kampfgeschwader 55 (KG 55) to the city.

Cunningham took off this night from RAF Middle Wallop in Hampshire to patrol north of London. When the direction of the raid was known, he was ordered to proceed to the East Midlands. GCI vectored Cunningham and his temporary radar operator John Phillipson; a former ground radar operator, onto an enemy aircraft, but the crew were forced much further westward. Search lights attracted their attention, and Phillipson was able to make a contact and guide him. Soon visual confirmation was made. A tell-tale sign of an aircraft was a blank patch of sky surrounded by a cluster of stars. Keeping in the enemy's blind spot, he flew below it and adjusted his speed to match the German pilot. After closing the range as much as he dared, he pulled up and fired with all four cannons, downing the Junkers Ju 88 bomber, which exploded upon hitting the ground near Wittering, Cambridgeshire at 00:35. Cunningham's victim, 3./KG 54 Ju 88 flown by Unteroffizier Kaspar Sondermeister, was not claimed as destroyed. However, after interrogation of the two German survivors who affirmed the circumstances, Cunningham was granted the victory.

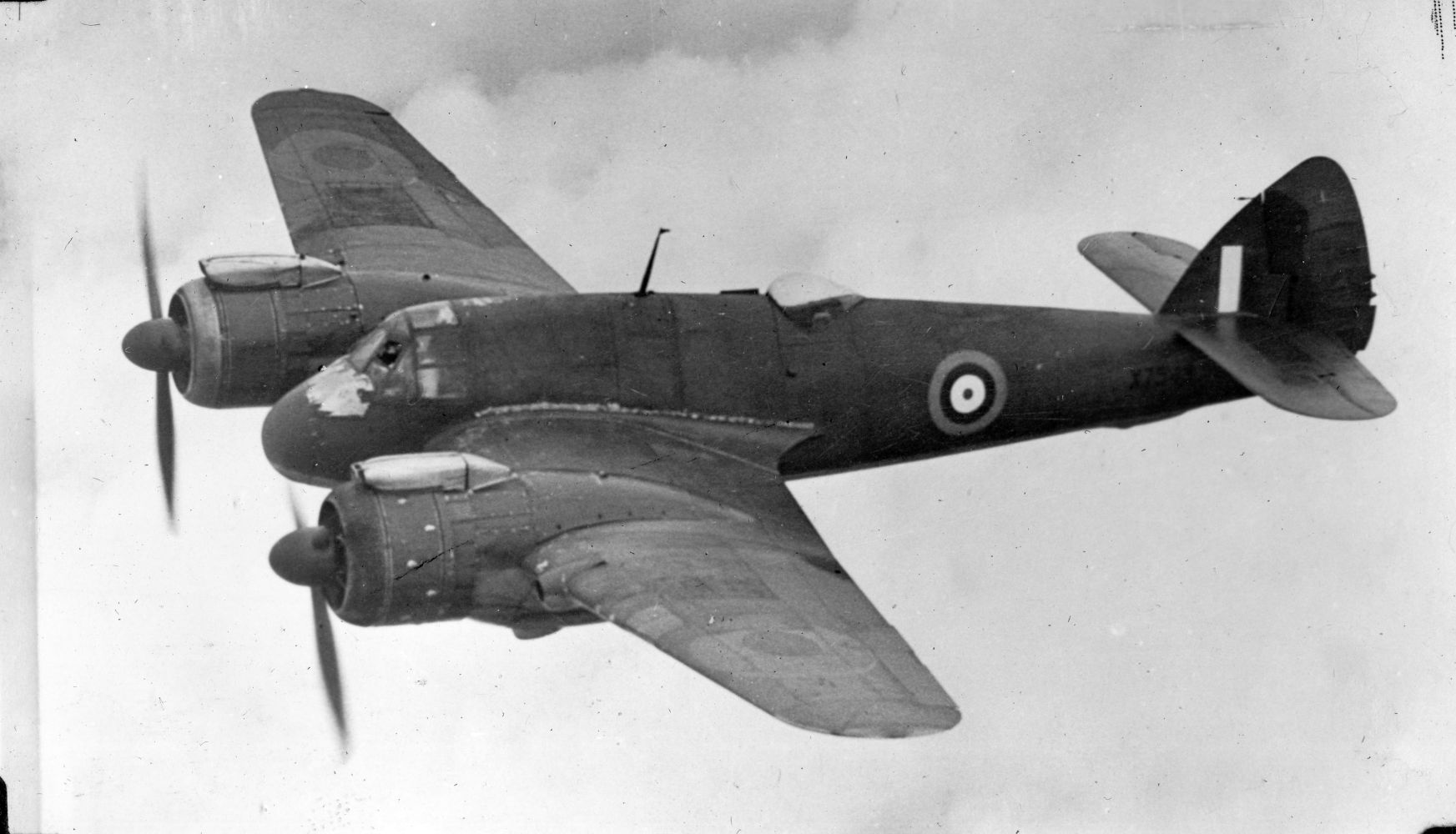
The Bristol Beaufighter; this variant does not carry the radar antenna on the wings or nose.

Cunningham had to wait a month for his next victory, on 23 December 1940. Kampfgeschwader 1 (KG 1) sent 100 bombers led by Kampfgruppe 100 to attack Manchester. GCI vectored Cunningham onto the enemy aircraft. It was not yet dark, and Cunningham identified the machine as a Heinkel He 111. Flying at 15,000 feet (4,600 metres), he saw the Heinkel above the Beaufighter at 16,500 feet (5,000 metres). Cunningham engaged the enemy 50 miles (80 kilometres) south of West Lulworth. The enemy climbed to 19,000 feet (5,800 metres). Following, Cunningham opened fire at 200–300 yards (180–270 metres). The He 111 was engulfed in fire. The bomber was high enough for the crew to jettison the bombs and incendiaries and glide to France, where it crash-landed at Cherbourg. Two of Feldwebel Georg Deininger's crew were wounded. The 3./KGr 100 machine was written off. The crew were unaware that they had been a victim of a night-fighter. They supposed they had been shot down by a flak ship.

On 2 January 1941, Cunningham nearly added a third. The Germans attacked Cardiff in the city's heaviest raid of the war. Cunningham engaged an He 111 that had an even spread of three aerial masts along its rear fuselage; indicative of a pathfinder. He expended all the Beaufighter's ammunition against it from the working cannons, one cannon jammed. It dived into clouds at 10,000 feet (3,000 metres) at an angle of 50 degrees. A 2./KGr 100 machine returned to France with a wounded gunner, and Cunningham received credit for a probable victory. On 12 January, he claimed a damaged He 111, his first, with operator Jimmy Rawnsley. Cunningham was awarded the Distinguished Flying Cross (DFC) on 28 January 1941 for his achievements, including 25 night sorties.

On 9 February, upon the invitation of Sholto Douglas and Charles Portal, Chief of the Air Staff, Cunningham arrived at the Air Ministry. He was ordered to report to Geoffrey de Havilland at Hatfield, though neither of the senior officers would say why. When Cunningham met Geoffrey de Havilland, he was summoned to a hangar. It was the first time Cunningham had laid eyes on the de Havilland Mosquito. Cunningham flew W4050, the prototype, on 9 February 1941. He was greatly impressed by the "lightness of the controls and generally pleasant handling characteristics". Cunningham concluded that when the type was fitted with AI equipment, it would be a perfect replacement for the Beaufighter.

Cunningham claimed a third victory on 15 February 1941. The Luftwaffe carried out air attacks on Liverpool and Humberside. Over Newton Abbot, Devon, he engaged a He 111 from Kampfgeschwader 27 (KG 27). It crashed outside Totnes. The bomber, 1G+FR, belonging to 7./KG 27, was completely destroyed. Leutnant Eberhard Beckmann and his crew were killed. The fifth victory eluded Cunningham for some time. On 12 March, he was twice vectored onto enemy aircraft by Rawnsley. He could only claim a Ju 88 and He 111 damaged. On the night of the 3 April 1941, he accounted for his fourth enemy aircraft. Although claimed as a He 111, the identity of the aircraft was likely the Ju 88 A-5, Werknummer ('factory number') 4224, code V4+AR of 7./KG 1, on a mission to raid Avonmouth. Leutnant Ernst Menge and his crew, Wilhelm Hahn, Robert König, and Wilhelm Schreiber, were posted as missing in action. On the night of the 7 April, he became a fighter ace. A He 111 of 9./KG 26 was intercepted as its bombers attacked Portsmouth and Portland Harbour. Leutnant Erwin Hartmann crashed into the Channel with his crew. A No. 87 Squadron RAF pilot, Flight lieutenant Derek Ward claimed the victory, as he saw a glow which he fired at before it hit the sea. Cunningham was credited with the victory, as the Heinkel was about to crash when Ward fired at it. The 87 Squadron war diary acknowledged this fact in its entry for that night.

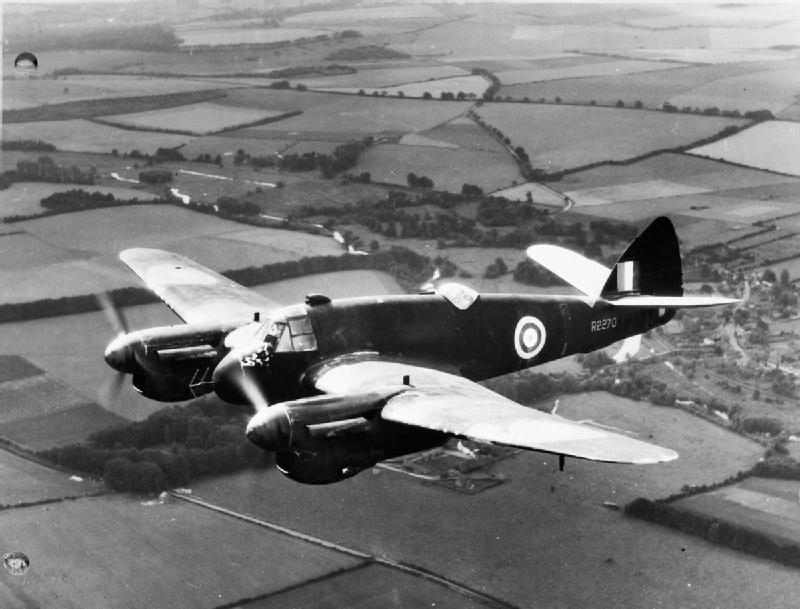
Bristol Beaufighter Mk.II with radar and Rolls-Royce Merlin engines. Cunningham flew the type in 1941 and 1942.

Two nights later, on 9 April, he accounted for another He 111, followed by another plus a probable victory on 11 April. It is possible his victim on the later mission was He 111 P-2, Werknummer 2002, 1G+HT of 9./KG 27. Pilot Leo Roth and crew members Oberfeldwebel Wilhelm Franke, and Unteroffizier Walter Rüggeberg and Fritz Unterieser were killed. A pilot from 307 Squadron also claimed the machine, which crashed at Prowers Farm, Lydlinch, Dorset at 01:35. One 8./KG 55 He 111 was lost with its crew over the Channel, and a Stab./KG 26 machine was lost over northern France when the crew abandoned their damaged aircraft. Cunningham's comrade in 604, Roderick Aeneas Chisholm, accounted for a 5./KG 54 Ju 88 near Portsmouth.

On 15 April, Cunningham was to have his most successful night, shooting down three bombers (victories no. 8–10). On patrol near the south coast, he engaged a He 111 over Monmouthshire, which he shot down with only 40 rounds. He returned to Middle Wallop, only to be sent on patrol for a second sortie. He took off and headed south, towards Southampton. GCI was too busy to employ him, and his request to investigate a searchlight cone towards Marlborough was granted. Rawnsley directed him into attack range, and he duly shot down the He 111, which crashed into derelict houses in Southampton. He was sent by GCI after another enemy, but lost the contact. Appearing over Southampton again, he spotted yet another He 111 in the moonlight. He closed to 80 yards (73 metres) and shot it down. It crashed in the area of Lymington. Cunningham's 9th victory was Werknummer 2857, code G1+ES, belonging to 8./KG 55. The Heinkel, piloted by Oberleutnant Günther von Seidlitz, crashed onto No. 10–12 Padwell Road, Southampton at 02:00. Seidlitz and Feldwebel Franz Hümmer were killed in action and Unteroffizier Horst Rosenberg and Herbert Sauer were taken prisoner. In April, having shot down at least ten aircraft in night-fighting operations, Cunningham was decorated with his first Distinguished Service Order (DSO).

On 3 May, Cunningham accounted for another Heinkel. Four nights later on 7 May 1941, Cunningham achieved a victory, his 12th, in front of King George VI. Sholto Douglas accompanied the King when he appeared at Danebury Hill, not far from Middle Wallop. The King met Cunningham and Rawnsley, congratulated the airmen on their success, and asked Cunningham to get another on that night. The King then was driven to the GCI station Sopley outside Bournemouth to tour the facility. Eager to impress the King, Cunningham drove to dispersal and prepared to go on patrol. The Luftwaffe attacked Liverpool, which took their flight path over 604's patrol area. Cunningham took off and intercepted a He 111 north of Bournemouth. The controller asked the King to go outside, as they might have an opportunity to witness the battle. Although they did not see it, the King heard the results: the roar of engines, and rattle of cannon fire. The Heinkel, from 7./KG 27, Werknummer 1639 code IG+DR, eventually crashed near Andersea Farm south of RAF Weston Zoyland at 23:30. Pilot Oberfeldwebel Heinz Laschinski and Oberfeldwebel Otto Willrich survived, though the pilot was badly burned. Flight Engineer Feldwebel Fritz Klemm and Feldwebel Heinz Schier were killed by gunfire. On the night of 31 May/1 June 1941, Cunningham and Rawnsley accounted for another He 111, as the Luftwaffe completed its last major raid of the Blitz. It was one of 24 German bombers lost on that night. The following morning, Cunningham was promoted to temporary squadron leader.

==== Propaganda ====
In early 1941, the British press, with permission from the Air Ministry, was allowed to approach Cunningham and write about his experiences. One of the motivating reasons for the lack of censorship was morale. In the early stages of the Blitz, the perception among the civilian population was that the Germans could attack at will over Britain during the night. Publication of Cunningham's exploits was an attempt to assure the public that the RAF was fighting back, and imposing losses upon the Luftwaffe. Cunningham was singled out for attention for this purpose, though Rawnsley's contribution to his success was virtually ignored.

The Air Ministry did not want to allow the enemy to learn that the RAF night fighter aircraft had aircraft interception radar. German night fighters would not be equipped with such devices on a large scale until much later. Instead, a legend was created to explain Cunningham's successes. As he was the first night fighter ace, the press was allowed to publish his picture. The captions read that his eyesight was so exceptional it allowed him to see in the dark with the same visual ability as a domestic cat. It was also said that his diet of carrots provided him with vitamin A, which allowed him to maintain excellent night vision. Cunningham detested the ensuing public adulation, but he accepted the 'Cat's Eyes' tag as a necessary deception. The propaganda story served its purpose for the populace when it was released to the public in January 1941. But the success of night defences also told the Germans that the RAF was either improving its techniques, or it had something new.

The premier night fighter aces in the RAF; Cunningham, Braham, and Branse Burbridge, did not appreciate press attention. In the case of Cunningham and Burbridge, this may have stemmed from deeper religious convictions about combat and killing. Burbridge became a priest during the war, and neither he nor Cunningham cooperated with biographers when approached to have their exploits described in print after the war. During the war, Braham also shunned the lime-light. The Daily Express asked to interview him, but he declined. Much to Braham's embarrassment, his father gave interviews about his famous son in 1943. When no stories were forthcoming, the newspapers soon lost interest. Braham and Cunningham were certainly aware of each other as a result of the press attention, and a competitive rivalry developed. In his book Scramble, Braham mentioned with pride the night he surpassed Cunningham's score permanently.

=== Wing commander ===
The dynamics of the air war changed in June 1941. The German invasion of the Soviet Union, Operation Barbarossa, opened the Eastern Front. The German bomber force was heavily committed to the theatre. The escalation of the fighting in the Mediterranean and North African theatres also diverted German air strength. Luftwaffe operations over Britain changed dramatically. Small numbers of bombers would make hit-and-run attacks on selected targets near the coast for the remainder of 1941, replacing the mass raids of the preceding autumn and winter. Cunningham used the decline in the pace of operations to train new crews.

Cunningham's practice of leadership was different from that of his day-fighter counterparts. A day unit would fly in formation together, engage the enemy together, communicate by radio, and follow the directions and example of their commanding officer in combat. Cunningham was not in a position to lead in this way. The night fighter was a lone hunter. When it took off, the crew would operate alone in the air. Instead, he could ensure proficiency in battle only by teaching his men to master their aircraft and AI. He was constantly in touch with scientists, and tracked new developments. He also took new crews up in the Beaufighter to generate confidence in the machine. Night pilots had to learn to fly on instruments alone, in adverse weather conditions, and for sustained periods. Rawnsley contributed with training on the use of AI, and mock interceptions using target aircraft were flown regularly.

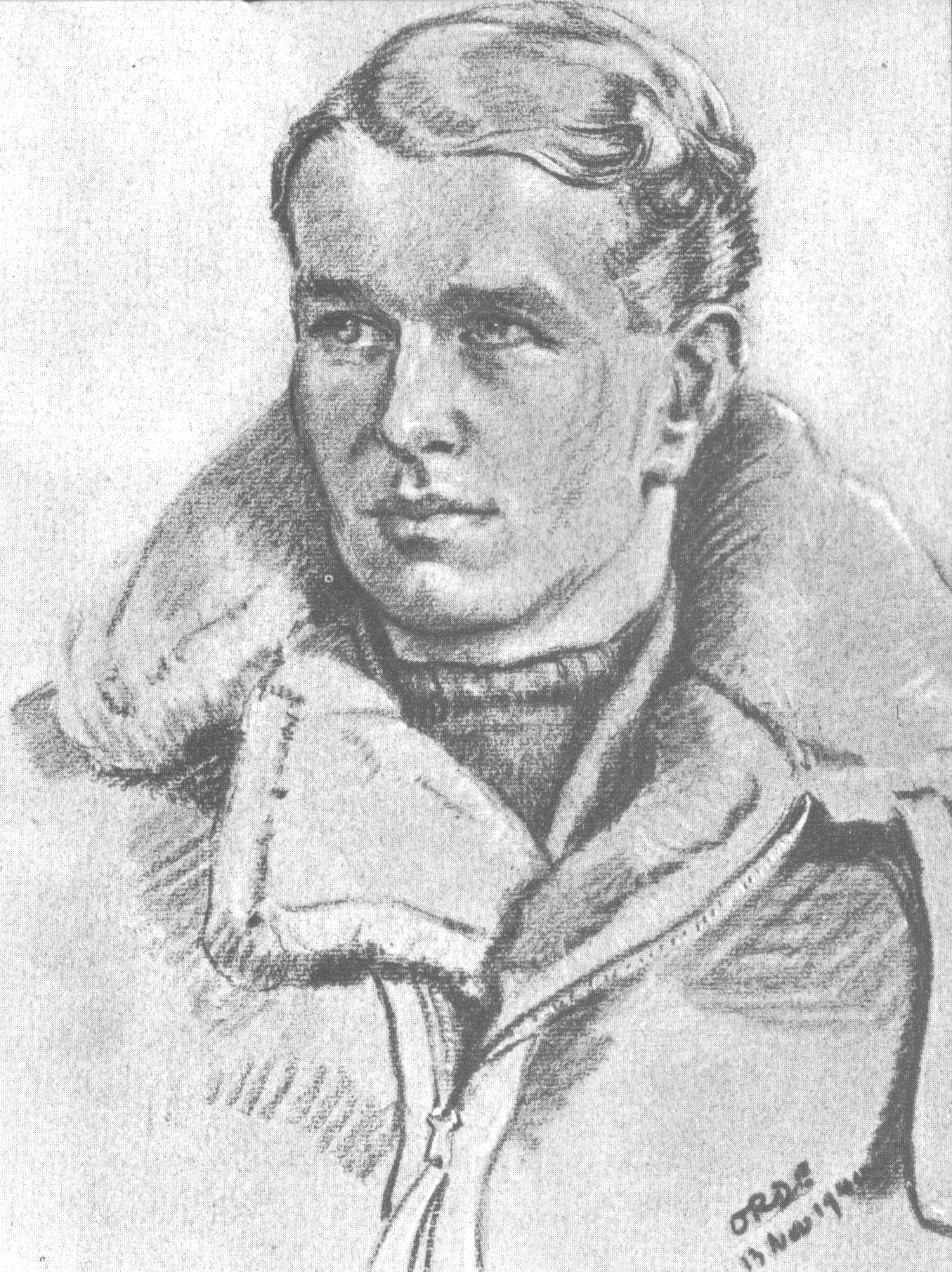
John Cunningham by Cuthbert Orde

Cunningham still flew on operations. Flying the new Beaufighter Mk.II powered by Merlin engines on an interception in July, he was hit by return fire from a He 111. The engines spluttered, and one caught fire. Already far out to sea, he flew back to base, extinguished the fire, and made a wheels-down landing. The following month, he had greater success. On the night of the 22 August 1941, he intercepted two He 111s. One was claimed as damaged, but the second was confirmed. The Heinkel He 111 H-5, Werknummer 4081, coded F8+BS belonging to 8./Kampfgeschwader 40 (KG 40), fell into the sea north-west of Wells-next-the-Sea at 22:05. Gefreiter G. Dohmen, H. Hädrich, and K. Dändel were never found. The body of Rudolf Faath was washed ashore at Burnham Overy on 31 August. On 1 September, Cunningham caught and downed a Ju 88, his 15th victory. He was awarded a bar to his DFC on 19 September, by which time he was an acting wing commander (Wg Cdr).

The winter 1941–42 passed by with relative inactivity. In the spring of 1942, Arthur Harris began his campaign over Germany in earnest, with an attack by RAF Bomber Command upon Lübeck. Enraged by the attack, Adolf Hitler ordered the Luftwaffe to begin retaliatory strikes, which began the so-called Baedeker Blitz. On 4 April, Cunningham engaged and damaged a Baedeker raider He 111 pathfinder operating over Exeter. It was able to escape into cloud. KGr 100, the specialist German pathfinder unit, was now operating with new navigational aids that allowed them to fly through and navigate in thick cloud and rain. They deliberately operated whenever the weather proved more difficult for night fighters. Nevertheless, Cunningham made an interception on the night of 23 May 1942.

Using his usual tactic, Cunningham approached from behind and below. Suddenly, the Heinkel lurched into a tight left-hand turn, allowing the gunners to fire a broad-side. The bomber disappeared into the mist. Cunningham asked GCI for help. They tracked the Heinkel flying north near Shaftesbury. Engaging again, the German pilot managed to turn into a head-on position and dive past Cunningham almost upside down. He continually evaded Cunningham by turning in underneath him at near-impossible angles. Cunningham and Rawnsley came to understand that they were not dealing with a novice. Soon a turning match began, and then the German attempted to escape by twisting and diving. Cunningham forced him down to 900 feet (270 metres), but Rawnsley and GCI lost contact when the ground clutter hid the Heinkel's signal. Cunningham returned to base. News soon came through that the He 111 had crashed onto the slopes on Cranborne Chase. Apparently, the Heinkel had broken through the clouds at only a hundred feet and dived vertically into the ground near the isolated village of Alvediston at 17:05. Intelligence later determined that the machine was a He 111H-6, Werknummer 4627, code 6N+FR, from 7./KGr 100. The bomber disintegrated upon impact. The pilot, Staffelkapitän (squadron leader) Hauptmann Siegried Langer was killed, along with his crew, Oberfeldwebel G. Schmidt, Feldwebel D. Hoffmann, P. Gaidies, and Gefreiter W. Worring. It was a unique victory for Cunningham. He had not fired his guns in the 150-minute chase.

Following this episode, Cunningham was promoted to temporary wing commander on 1 June 1942, and following the downing of his 16th enemy aircraft, he received a bar to his DSO on 24 July for, among other feats, "destroying an enemy aircraft without firing a single bullet... by diving through cloud at great speed, drove the enemy aircraft to the ground."

Cunningham and Rawnsley were soon ordered to staff positions. Before they departed Middle Wallop and 604 Squadron, they had a chance to test the new 4 inches (10 centimetres) AI Mk. VIII radar, which had a range of two or three miles (3–5 kilometres). The new radar was a radical improvement. All the information was displayed on a single tube. The ground echo was reduced, but could still be seen on screen when flying low, but it did not interfere with the overall picture. Cunningham was to take over as director of all training units from Rory Chisholm, who left 604 to become a staff officer at group headquarters. Rawnsley was due to take an instructor job at 62 Operational Training Unit (62 OTU) at RAF Usworth. Cunningham managed to persuade the CAS to deploy him to headquarters at No. 81 Group RAF, the training organisation for RAF Fighter Command. Rawnsley was also promoted to squadron leader and was awarded the DFC and Distinguished Flying Medal (DFM). The pair remained grounded for six months, until January 1943.

=== Last tour ===
In January 1943, Cunningham was allowed back onto operations. He was given command of 85 Squadron, equipped with the Mosquito NF.II and based at RAF Hunsdon. He selected Jimmy Rawnsley as his operator. The new radar set displayed the entire picture. A small cathode-ray tube set on the left side of the instrument panel gave Cunningham a composite image. The duo decided Rawnsley should control the interception in the initial stages, until they reached a point where the enemy could take evasive action. Then Cunningham would take over while Rawnsley would call out the ranges and free the pilot from looking at his ray-tube.

On the night of 3 March 1943, the Luftwaffe was active again. Cunningham scrambled too late to get contact by GCI. Searchlights operated in a box-shape, separated by evenly spaced markers, and he climbed towards a box. Each fighter was given a box and flew to its allotted marker beacon. There he orbited until the lights illuminated a target or formed a cone where he could pick up an AI contact. Soon he had a contact, a Dornier Do 217; he closed in, but his cannons jammed. After he had sat behind the Dornier for some time and tried in vain to encourage the guns to fire, the German crew suddenly became aware of his presence and dived away. Cunningham was furious: three-quarters of the squadron got airborne, but only he had seen an enemy. Unsatisfied with ground- and aircrews, he used his influence in the small night-fighter community to bring in personnel from his old unit, 604, which was languishing in Cornwall. With the new Mk VIII radar a uniform facility, Cunningham took over a Mosquito NF.XII; the first Mosquito to have a smooth 'bluff' nose dome over the dish antenna.

At this time, the Luftwaffe was sending increased numbers of Focke-Wulf Fw 190 fighters over England, at night and at low-level. They were able to hit coastal targets, and their speed and agility meant they were difficult to intercept. The German pilots were disadvantaged in some respects: there was a lack of night-flying experience in these units, and the Fw 190s did not carry radar and had a short range. Aside from a small mirror, the pilot could not always see behind him well enough at night. On 16 May 1943, the Fw 190s lost four and probably a fifth to 85 Squadron. On 13 June 1943, Cunningham intercepted a Fw 190 not far from his airfield at West Malling. The GCI controller telephoned the crew-room to notify them the commanding officer was closing on an enemy aircraft heading to London. They heard both aircraft, and the brief burst of fire followed by the explosion. To his amazement, Cunningham later learned the pilot; Leutnant Ullrich from 3./Schnellkampfgeschwader 10 (Fast Bomber Wing 10, SKG 10), was thrown through the canopy as the Fw 190A-5, Werknummer, 840047 code CO+LT, fell earthwards. He opened his parachute and with a broken arm, was picked up by a searchlight crew.

On the night of 23 August, a Fw 190 was claimed off Dunkirk, and on 8/9 September 1943, a Fw 190A-5 off Aldeburgh proved his 19th victory, and his last claim for that year. The Fw 190 was seen to crash into the sea by the Coastguard. Cunningham achieved his 20th and final air victory on the night of 2/3 January 1944. He chased a Messerschmitt Me 410 to France, near Boulogne, before shooting it down. The machine, Werknummer 017, code U5+FE, belonging to 14./Kampfgeschwader 2 (KG 2), crashed at Marquise. Oberleutnant Helmut Schülze and Heinz Beger were killed.

In January 1944, the Luftwaffe initiated Operation Steinbock. Cunningham filed two claims during the offensive, which lasted until May 1944. On the night of 20/21 February 1944, he claimed a Junkers Ju 188 damaged at 22:09 near Staplehurst. A Ju 188 was lost, and its destruction was attributed to another pilot. On the night of 23/24 February, he claimed a probable victory against another Ju 188 off Beachy Head. One Ju 188E-1 landed at Coulommiers after surviving an attack by a night fighter. Werknummer 260222, code U5+AN from 5./KG 2 returned with two crewmen injured; Unteroffizier Johann Triebel and Wihelm Spönemann. During one of these missions, while flying Mosquito XII DZ302 on 7 October 1944, Cunningham was nearly shot down. Closing in on a Ju 188 from astern, the gunners suddenly opened fire and the Junkers took evasive manoeuvres. A round struck the windscreen, nearly shattering it. Glass fragments struck Cunningham in the face; these were later removed in a field hospital. Later, a captured German crew told intelligence officers Neptun, a new radar, was being used in the rear of German aircraft to detect night fighters. Bombers thus became more difficult to surprise. Cunningham's last encounter with the enemy in 1944 was in pursuit of a Me 410. He had to give up when his windscreen iced over near the French coast.

On 3 March 1944, he was awarded another bar to his DSO. The citation saying "his iron determination and unswerving devotion to duty have set an example beyond praise". On 11 April 1944, Cunningham was decorated by the Soviet Union with the Order of the Patriotic War, 1st Class.

=== Group captain ===
In March 1944, Cunningham relinquished command of 85 Squadron. He was appointed group captain (Gp Cpt) in command of Night Operations at No. 11 Group RAF. At 26, he was one of the youngest to hold that rank. Air marshal Roderick Hill asked him to report to de Havilland in company with Adolph Malan. They were to test-fly the de Havilland Vampire. Cunningham commented that the machine would make an ideal night fighter. Although he was not familiar with the workings of the de Havilland Goblin turbojet, he recommended that if the cockpit was extended to allow for a navigator and the fuel tanks were enlarged, the type could make a formidable interceptor. While test-flying, Cunningham and Rawnsley carried out a sortie over Normandy from RAF Uxbridge. They overflew the British sector on the 9 June 1944 as the Battle for Caen began. They were vectored onto enemy aircraft but were unable to hold their contacts.

On 13 June 1944, the V-1 flying bomb offensive began and Cunningham was tasked with assisting with their interception. He also coordinated his efforts with No. 100 Group RAF, which were engaged in intruder operations over occupied Europe. Cunningham was concerned at using Mosquitoes for intercepting V-1s, because of the dangers of the bomb exploding and damaging the attacking fighter. One of his former commanding officers and current Group captain Edward Crew; an ace with 15 enemy aircraft and 31 V-1s shot down, was forced to bail out when the nose of his Mosquito was split open. The operations did not last long, and by August 1944, the Mosquitoes were back on bomber support missions. He was promoted to wing commander (Wg Cdr) (war-substantive) on 1 September 1944.

Towards the end of the war, he spent most of his time flying throughout Europe and meeting various commanding officers and units. He took advantage of his position to fly other types he had not had the chance to operate. He flew Supermarine Spitfires frequently on such trips. Soon after the Normandy Campaign, he took leave to visit his mother in Ireland. She was staying with his sister Mary, (and his niece) whose husband had been killed in action at Anzio in Italy. He remained with 11 Group until the capitulation of Germany on 8 May 1945.

In July 1945, he was sent to the Far East. A group was created which was a collection of RAF forces that were to be used to recover Singapore from the Japanese. Cunningham and Rawnsley flew out to Rangoon via Malta, Cairo, Baghdad, and Karachi. Soon after they arrived, they learned of the atomic attacks against Japan. On 2 September 1945, Japan surrendered, and the Second World War was over. Cunningham was offered a permanent commission in the RAF; but he feared his career, if he stayed, would become mired in administration, policy-making, staff courses, and committees. It would mean flying would become a secondary occupation. He decided to return to de Havilland. The company had asked the RAF to release him the previous summer, but had been refused. He was formally de-mobilised in November 1945, and re-joined de Havilland on 1 December.

== Post-war activities ==
Cunningham relinquished his RAF commission officially on 1 August 1946, retaining the rank of group captain, but remaining in the re-constituted Auxiliary Air Force (AAF) with the permanent rank of squadron leader. He reformed his old auxiliary squadron at the request of the Air Ministry in 1946, but took no active part in its running, serving as a reserve officer in the RAuxAF until his retirement as a reserve squadron leader on 1 August 1967.

At de Havilland, he was awarded a salary of £1,500 in a company that had expanded enormously during the war. The number of employees rose from 5,000 to 38,000. The turnover of the company had gone from £1.5 million before the war, to £25 million, and was now supported by around 100 factories. Cunningham took the title of chief test pilot of the de Havilland Engine Company under the supervision of Geoffrey de Havilland Jr. Cunningham served as a pilot and consultant in a series of deals with the Swedish Air Force and Swiss Air Force. Both countries were keen to employ him, but Cunningham visited only to deliver and advise on the Vampire and British AI radar design. In 1990, the Swiss presented him with the spade-grip from the control column mounted on a wooden stand when they withdrew the last of their Vampires. When the Swedes retired the aircraft type in 1997, he was invited to celebrate its 50 years of Swedish service.

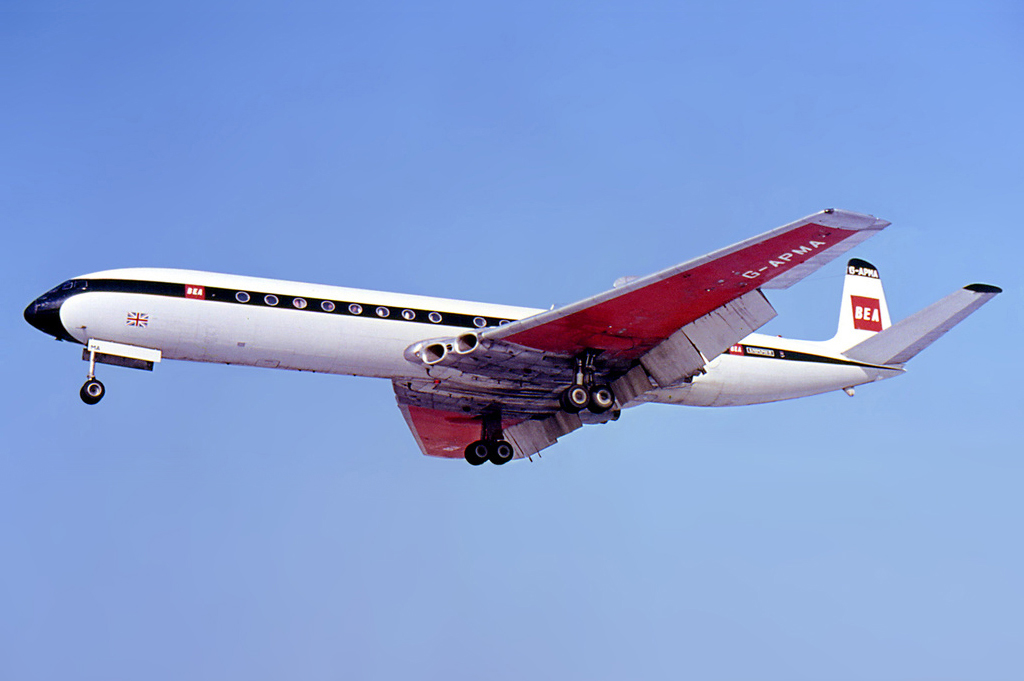
The world's first jet airliner: the de Havilland Comet

On 27 September 1946, Geoffrey de Havilland Jr was killed test-flying the DH.108 Swallow over the Thames estuary. Cunningham had taken off at the same time to deliver the first Vampire in Switzerland. Cunningham only learned the next morning, from Swiss newspapers at breakfast in Geneva, that de Havilland was missing. Cunningham knew the family well and contacted de Havilland's father, whose other son John had been killed in a collision while flying a Mosquito in 1943. With the agreement of de Havilland senior, Cunningham took over Geoffrey Jr.'s post at £2,000 per year.

In March 1948, he set a world flight altitude record of 59,430 feet (18,114 metres) in a Ghost-powered Vampire. The flight lasted for 45 minutes, reaching 50,000 feet (15,000 metres) in 13.5 minutes. The following year, he went on to test the de Havilland Comet, the world's first jet airliner which first flew on 27 July 1949. In 1951, Cunningham was made an Officer of the British Empire (OBE), and was raised to Commander of the British Empire (CBE) in 1963. On 23 May 1952, he flew the Comet, now a highly successful export, carrying the recently widowed Queen Mother and Princess Margaret on a four-hour tour around the Alps. At one point, he supervised the Queen Mother as she took the controls. She was to dine with members of the No. 600 Royal Auxiliary Air Force squadron later that night, and was anxious to say she had piloted an aircraft. Cunningham continued to test-fly prototypes such as the re-built Comet 3 and 4 in the late 1950s. In 1955, he was awarded the Gold Medal of the Royal Aero Club. On 23 October 1956, he travelled to the United States and received the Harmon Trophy from President Dwight D. Eisenhower. It was the most prestigious American trophy for services of civil aviation.

On 1 December 1958, he was appointed a member of the de Havilland board, but the company was sold and merged into Hawker Siddeley in 1960. With the Siddeley company, he was instrumental in the development in the Hawker Siddeley Trident in 1962. Cunningham worked under the managing director, Arnold Hall, whom he had first met in 1940 to iron out the malfunctions in the Beaufighter gun sight. Later, Cunningham acted as a consultant and advisor to the Chinese Government from 1972 to 1979, as the company sought to increase its revenue by selling aircraft to China. At their insistence, he postponed his retirement for three years to complete a series of aircraft sales. On 1 May 1975, the British Government announced the nationalisation of the industry, and British Aerospace (BAe) consumed all the nations' manufacturers.

Cunningham had one serious accident whilst flying. On 20 November 1975 at Dunsfold Aerodrome, Surrey, a number of birds were ingested by the engines of the British Aerospace BAe 125 just after takeoff. Forced to make an emergency landing, Cunningham put the aircraft down onto the runway at 130 miles per hour (210 kilometres per hour), but it careered across a public road where it collided with a car carrying six people, who were killed; no-one died on board the HS-125. Cunningham suffered two crushed vertebra, but he remained chief test pilot at Hawker Siddeley until 1978, when British Aerospace was formed. He retired from British Aerospace in 1980.

For several years he was a member of the Flying Control Committee (FCC) of the Farnborough Air Show. He used his expertise to ensure that pilots gave safe displays and did not go too far either flying over the crowd or risking a crash. These checks were carried out in the week before the public were admitted to the display, maybe unique in vetting displays before the public saw them. In these events, his remarks, opinions and advice were respected by the FCC and also by display pilots.

In his retirement, Cunningham devoted himself to aviation affairs of a charitable nature while building a retirement fund for himself. In 1980, he was appointed Chairman of the Sir Geoffrey de Havilland Flying Foundation, a charity to devoted to helping young people with aspirations in aviation. Over a number of years, former senior RAF officers had been attracted to investing in Lloyd's of London as a Lloyd's 'name'. Cunningham's commitment was one of unlimited liability, and so when Lloyd's ran into financial difficulty in 1988, he was faced with enormous debts. He was forced to live frugally until the end of his life. Having never married, John Cunningham died a bachelor aged 84 on 21 July 2002.

== Honours and awards ==
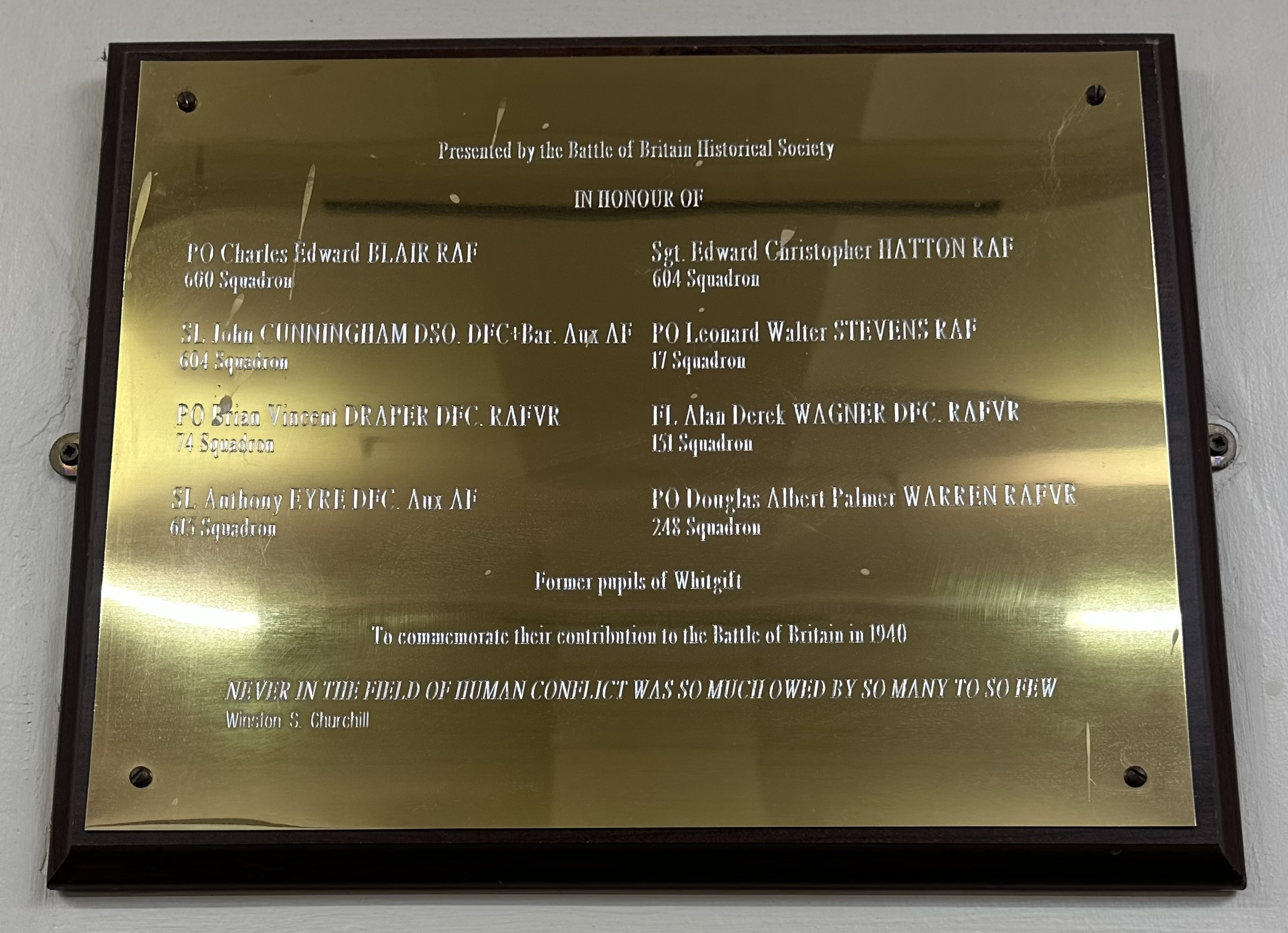
Plaque memorial with Cunningham's name, at Whitgift School, Croydon

In recognition of his wartime exploits and his contribution to civil aviation, he was appointed a Commander of the Order of the British Empire (CBE) in the 1963 Birthday Honours. He was awarded the Segrave Trophy for his services in 1978. He is listed on a memorial plaque in honour of former Whitgift School pupils who were Battle of Britain pilots; the plaque was unveiled at the school in 2006.

== Sale of medals ==
Following Cunningham's death in 2002, his service medals and flying memorabilia passed to the de Havilland Aircraft Company Trust. The medals were subsequently sold on 6 September 2012 for £384,000 to help raise funds for an education centre, museum, and flying scholarships for young people on behalf of the Bentley Priory Battle of Britain Trust Appeal.
