= Lambeth Endowed Charities =

Organisation to address poverty in London, United Kingdom

The Walcot Foundation (previously known as the Lambeth Endowed Charities) is an independent grant maker concerned with addressing the needs of people in poverty living in Lambeth, London, United Kingdom.

== History ==
The Foundation can trace its origins to the 1620s. It is the product of a number of endowed charities set up between the 1620s and the 1950s, all broadly concerned with the relief of the poor. The ‘area of benefit’ is coterminous with the modern-day Borough of Lambeth, one of London’s 12 inner boroughs and one with relatively high levels of deprivation and social need. The principal constituent charity is the Walcot Educational Foundation, named after Edmund Walcot(t). By his Will of 1667 he left seventeen acres of land in North Lambeth, close to the River Thames, to provide income for the relief of the local poor. Over the centuries these assets changed and grew and now provide the bulk of the income used to fund grants programmes.

== Current approaches and activity ==
Current grant making amounts to c£2M a year.

In recent times the Foundation has adopted a progressive strategy in realising its aim of relieving poverty in Lambeth. Grants are purposeful, with the intention of making a sustainable improvement in the lives of recipients; applicant organisations must show explicit and realistic ‘outputs and outcomes’ that will benefit the individuals the charities exist to serve; some awards are concerned with strategic approaches to the needs of individuals in poverty, examples of which include support for the local credit union, tackling in-work poverty and the funding of projects teaching financial literacy to school children.

The Foundation seeks to apply the intentions of its 17th-century benefactors to the needs of 21st-century people in Lambeth. It offers "a hand up, not a hand out". There is no doubt that poverty looks different today than it did in the 1620s, but for those affected by it, the impact remains damaging both of the human spirit and of the opportunities many others take for granted.

== Governance and administration ==
A board of governors sets the strategic direction of the charities and acts as steward of the charities' historic resources. The director and a small staff team advise on policy development, handle day-to-day operations and manage the Walcot Estate. The bulk of the activity is concerned with assessing applications, working with applicants, and, after awards have been approved by the Governors, monitoring their impact.

== Opportunities to help ==
There are various ways in which interested parties may help in the work of the Foundation, for example by volunteering a particular skill, offering to serve as a governor or special adviser, or by making a gift or leaving a legacy to strengthen and build on the work of the original benefactors.

== Contact ==
The Foundation operates from offices in Kennington Road. See website for more information.
