= List of 1990s American television episodes with LGBTQ themes =

A list of 1990s American television episodes with LGBTQ themes includes a number that engendered controversies relating to LGBTQ representation. With the exception of what would come to be known as "Lesbian kiss episodes", in which a straight-identified female character exchanges an intimate kiss with a lesbian or bisexual character, who was generally never seen again, representation of same-sex sexual or affectional displays lagged well behind the behaviour in which mixed-sex pairs engaged. In addition to the controversy that surrounded the sight of two men in bed together on thirtysomething, controversies were generated around lesbian kiss episodes on L.A. Law ("He's a Crowd"), Roseanne ("Don't Ask, Don't Tell") and Picket Fences ("Sugar & Spice"). A similar controversy surrounded Fox's decision to cut a kiss between gay character Matt Fielding (Doug Savant) and a male guest star from an episode of Melrose Place (1994's "'Til Death Do Us Part"). The hesitancy about allowing any expression of same-sex affection on television even extended to the refusal of allowing same-sex couples having weddings or commitment ceremonies on series including Roseanne ("December Bride"), Northern Exposure ("I Feel the Earth Move") and Friends ("The One with the Lesbian Wedding") to kiss at the conclusion of the ceremony. During a period in network television history when producers were pushing the broadcast boundaries on sexually explicit content with such shows as NYPD Blue, the controversy over this and other television episodes that made inroads into presenting same-sex sexuality or affection led producers not to present any sexualization of their gay and lesbian characters. As noted by author Ron Becker,

So viewers got to see Carol and Susan wed on Friends, but they didn't get to see them kiss. And fans of NYPD Blue could hear male hustlers talk about their johns, but the only sex they got to see involved the precinct's straight cops—naked butts and all. Clearly, chastity was the price gay characters paid for admission to prime-time television in the 1990s.

In 1997, "The Puppy Episode" of Ellen aired, in which lead character Ellen Morgan came out concomitant with series star Ellen DeGeneres coming out in her public life. "The Puppy Episode" was an enormous popular and critical success, drawing some 42 million viewers and winning two Emmy Awards and a Peabody Award. DeGeneres won a GLAAD Media Award in 1998. Ellen Morgan's coming out has been described as "the most hyped, anticipated, and possibly influential gay moment on television". The LGBTQ media watchdog group Gay and Lesbian Alliance Against Defamation (GLAAD) credits Ellen with paving the way for such LGBTQ-themed programming as Will & Grace (1998), The L Word (2004) and Ugly Betty (2006) and it has been suggested that Ellen and these other series presenting LGBTQ characters have helped to reduce societal prejudice against LGBTQ people.

== Episodes ==
Year	Series	Network	Episode	Synopsis
1990	21 Jump Street	Fox	"A Change of Heart"	A lesbian teacher is murdered and a lesbian student makes a pass at Hoffs (Holly Robinson Peete).
1990	American Playhouse	PBS	"Andre's Mother"	Cal (Richard Thomas), Andre's lover, and Andre's Mother (Sada Thompson) struggle to come to terms with Andre's death.
1990	Designing Women	CBS	"Suzanne Goes Looking for a Friend"	Suzanne (Delta Burke) misunderstands the "coming out" announcement of a former beauty queen and current television weather forecaster.
1990	Doctor, Doctor	CBS	"Accentuate the Positive"	Deirdre (Maureen Mueller) is uncomfortable treating local newsman Hugh Persons (Brian George) for AIDS.
1990	Doctor, Doctor	CBS	"The Terminator"	The staff is terrified of a new employee (Charles Rocket), believing he's ex-Green Beret who destroyed an entire village. It turns out the man is gay and wore a green beret when he was a backup dancer for the Village People.
1990	The Fanelli Boys	NBC	"Pursued"	Dominic Fanelli (Joe Pantoliano) is jealous that his old friend Tommy Espozito (Chazz Palminteri) wants to spend more time with other friends than with him, until Tommy comes out. Dominic then begins to worry about his younger brother Frankie (Chris Meloni) spending a weekend in a cabin with Tommy.
1990	The Golden Girls	NBC	"Ebbtide's Revenge"	Dorothy (Beatrice Arthur) attends the funeral for her younger brother Phil Petrillo. Phil was a heterosexual cross-dresser.
1990	L.A. Law	NBC	"Outward Bound"	A gay police officer (Craig Wasson) files suit when he is outed in the gay press.
1990	L.A. Law	NBC	"Smoke Gets in Your Thighs"	The firm represents a man whose lover is dying of ALS when the dying man's parents refuse visitation rights.
1990	Law & Order	NBC	"The Reaper's Helper"	Jack Curry (Peter Frechette), a gay man with AIDS, is accused of murdering another gay man with AIDS and claims it was a mercy killing. NBC reportedly lost $1 million in revenue when advertisers pulled out of this and another 1990 episode.
1990	Lifestories	NBC	"Steve Burdick"	Burdick (D. W. Moffett) is an HIV-positive gay television reporter. After his lover dies of AIDS, Burdick reveals his sexuality and diagnosis on the air. The episode was initially scheduled for December 2 but NBC pulled it, prompting some questions by LGBT and AIDS activists. The network aired the episode on December 19.
1990	Married... with Children	Fox	"The Dance Show"	Peg (Katey Sagal) goes dancing with a man and the man's boyfriend confronts Al (Ed O'Neill).
1990	Northern Exposure	CBS	"Brains, Know How and Native Intelligence"	Chris (John Corbett) angers Maurice (Barry Corbin) when he reads some poetry on air by Walt Whitman and mentions the poet's homosexuality.
1990	Quantum Leap	NBC	"Good Night, Dear Heart"	Sam investigates a young woman's apparent suicide, learning the woman was really accidentally killed by Stephanie Haywood (Marcia Cross), her jealous girlfriend. Haywood was featured in issue #9 of the Quantum Leap comic book which documents her involvement with the Stonewall riots.
1990	Roseanne	ABC	"Trick or Treat"	Dan is upset that DJ wants to be a witch for Halloween, while Roseanne dresses up as a man.
1990	The Simpsons	Fox	"Simpson and Delilah"	Homer (voiced by Dan Castellaneta) is promoted and gets a new secretary named Karl (voiced by Harvey Fierstein) who later kisses him.
1990	Star Trek: The Next Generation	Syndicated	"The Host"	Beverly Crusher (Gates McFadden) falls in love with a male Trill ambassador. When he dies and the Trill symbiote is moved into a female host, Crusher ends the relationship.
1990	Wings	NBC	"There's Always Room for Cello"	R.J. Biggins (Abraham Benrubi), Roy's (David Schramm) gay son, makes his first appearance.
1991	Beverly Hills, 90210	Fox	"Summer Storm"	Kelly (Jennie Garth) is interested in Kyle Connors (David Lascher) but Kyle is gay.
1991	Coach	ABC	"A Real Guy's Guy"	Hayden (Craig T. Nelson) pressures Kelly to date his star player (Rob Youngblood), only to find out that he is gay. Hayden talks it out with the player in what is unbeknownst to him a gay bar in which two of Hayden's former players are seen dancing.
1991	Dear John	NBC	"Kirk's Ex-Wife"	Kirk (Jere Burns) goes into hiding when the group discovers his wife left him for another woman.
1991	Designing Women	CBS	"Toe in the Water"	Julia (Dixie Carter) starts dating again after the death of her long-term beau, choosing Mark (Charles Frank), whom her cousin Allison (Julia Duffy) pegs as "the gayest human being I've ever met in my life" because he knows what a peplum is and references Ida Lupino. Mark is not gay but Julia realizes she is not ready to date.
1991	The Golden Girls	NBC	"Sister of the Bride"	Blanche's (Rue McClanahan) brother Clayton (Monte Markham) returns with a boyfriend with whom he intends to have a commitment ceremony.
1991	L.A. Law	NBC	"Speak, Lawyers for Me"	A transgender model (Claudia Christian) sues the cosmetics company that fired her after discovering her status.
1991	L.A. Law	NBC	"He's a Crowd"	Kuzak (Harry Hamlin) defends a man with multiple personalities, one of whom is an elderly woman. Bisexual C. J. Lamb (Amanda Donohoe) and straight-identifying Abby Perkins (Michele Greene) share an intimate kiss, leading Abby to consider the idea of a relationship.
1991	L.A. Law	NBC	"Since I Fell for You"	Mark Gilliam (Stanley Kamel), a gay lawyer with AIDS, sues his insurance company when it refuses to pay for an experimental treatment.
1991	L.A. Law	NBC	"Do the Spike Thing"	An old college friend comes out to Douglas Brackman (Alan Rachins). When Brackman is gay-bashed he first tries to cover up the event. Eventually he accedes to his friend's wishes and testifies against the attacker, at the same time confronting some of his own homophobia.
1991	L.A. Law	NBC	"The Nut Before Christmas"	Arnold Becker (Corbin Bernsen) defends C.J.'s former lover, whose ex-husband is threatening to take her children away from her for being lesbian.
1991	Northern Exposure	CBS	"What I Did for Love"	It is discovered that the town was founded by a lesbian couple, Roslyn and Cicely, who fled homophobia in Montana in the early 1900s.
1991	Northern Exposure	CBS	"Slow Dance"	A gay couple, Ron Bantz (Doug Ballard) and Erick Hillman (Don R. McManus), buy a bed and breakfast from the conservative and homophobic Maurice.
1991	Roc	Fox	"Can't Help Loving That Man"	Andrew's brother Russell (Richard Roundtree) visits with his longtime white lover and announces that the two of them plan to wed.
1991	Roseanne	ABC	"Dances with Darlene"	After trying to get Leon (Martin Mull) to date a woman who works for the headquarters of Rodbell's, Roseanne and Bonnie (Bonnie Bramlett) discover that he is gay when his boyfriend comes to pick him up from work.
1991	Street Justice	Syndication	"Bashing"	Malloy's (Charlene Fernetz) gay brother Danny comes to visit looking forward to a birthday celebration, but instead, he is beaten to death by a group of young thugs just because he is gay.
1992	American Playhouse	PBS	"Tru"	Robert Morse plays gay American author Truman Capote.
1992	Cheers	NBC	"Rebecca's Lover... Not"	Harvey Fierstein guest stars as a man whom Rebecca (Kirstie Alley) had a crush on in high school and is oblivious to his being gay.
1992	Civil Wars	ABC	"Oceans White with Phone"	A gay man is involved in a palimony suit.
1992	Civil Wars	ABC	"A Bus Named Desire"	A lesbian sues for visitation rights.
1992	Dream On	HBO	"For Peter's Sake"	Martin (Brian Benben) is assigned to edit the memoirs of a gay author (David Clennon) with AIDS.
1992	Dream On	HBO	"What Women Want"	Martin's new girlfriend, Stephanie (Jessica Lundy), is bisexual and her ex-girlfriend, Robin (Jennifer Tilly), is determined to win her back.
1992	Dream On	HBO	"The Guilty Party"	At a bachelor party, Martin discovers that his childhood friend, Jerry (David Hyde Pierce), has a crush on him.
1992	The Golden Girls	NBC	"Goodbye, Mr. Gordon"	Blanche and Dorothy are mistaken for a couple on a talk show.
1992	Hearts Afire	CBS	"Bees Can Sting You, Watch Out"	John (John Ritter) discovers his ex-wife Diandra (Julie Cobb) is now dating Ruth (Conchata Ferrell).
1992	Hearts Afire	CBS	"Conversations with My Shrink"	Georgie (Markie Post) seeks guidance from Deandra's lover, Dr. Ruth (Conchata Ferrell), after she is unable to find a job and believes it's because she's a woman.
1992	Herman's Head	Fox	"Spermin' Herman"	Herman's (William Ragsdale) ex-girlfriend is a lesbian and wants Herman to donate sperm.
1992	Law & Order	NBC	"Silence"	A politician opposes the prosecution of his son's murderer because it might mean revealing that his late son was gay.
1992	Murder She Wrote	CBS	"The Dead File"	Harvey Fierstein plays a comic strip artist who, while previously married and divorced, seems fond of his male coworker.
1992	Murphy Brown	CBS	"Come Out, Come Out, Wherever You Are"	Miles (Grant Shaud) worries that he might be gay following a dream about dolphins, the Washington Monument and a gay co-worker.
1992	Northern Exposure	CBS	"Cicely"	The story of Cicely's founding by a lesbian couple is told in flashbacks.
1992	Picket Fences	CBS	"Remembering Rosemary"	The investigation into a ten-year-old death reveals that a husband murdered his wife after discovering she was in love with another woman.
1992	Picket Fences	CBS	"Pageantry"	A teacher named Louise Talbot (Natalia Nogulich) is revealed to be transgender.
1992	Quantum Leap	NBC	"Running for Honor"	Sam leaps into a brilliant naval academy cadet (who might be gay) whose roommate Phillip (Sean O'Bryan) was expelled for being gay and who may become the next victim of a group of gay-bashing cadets who call themselves The CHAIN (Cadets Honoring An Ideal Navy). Coach Martz (John Roselius) comes out to help prevent Phillip from killing himself.
1992	Roseanne	ABC	"Ladies Choice"	Nancy Bartlett Thomas (Sandra Bernhard) tells Roseanne and Jackie that she is a lesbian and dating Marla (Morgan Fairchild).
1992	Roseanne	ABC	"Stand on Your Man"	Nancy stands up to Arnie (Tom Arnold), who wants her back even more after learning that she is a lesbian.
1992	Seinfeld	NBC	"The Cheever Letters"	George (Jason Alexander) finds love letters written to his girlfriend's father by John Cheever.
1992	Star Trek: The Next Generation	Syndicated	"The Outcast"	Commander William Riker (Jonathan Frakes) falls in love with Soren, a member of an alien race called the J'naii. The J'naii society believes that of any sort of male or female gender, and especially sexual liaisons, are primitive.
1993	The Adventures of Brisco County, Jr.	Fox	"No Man's Land"	Brisco and Professor Wickwire end up in a town inhabited only by women.
1993	CBS Schoolbreak Special	CBS	"Other Mothers"	Will (Justin Whalin) is afraid that word will get out at school that he has two lesbian mothers (Meredith Baxter, Joanna Cassidy).
1993	Cheers	NBC	"One for the Road"	Diane (Shelley Long) asks a gay friend to pose as her husband so as to one-up Sam (Ted Danson).
1993	Designing Women	CBS	"The Lying Game"	When Carlene (Jan Hooks) learns that the man she is dating is a cross-dresser, she cross-dresses herself to try to understand him better.
1993	Doogie Howser, M.D.	ABC	"Spell it M-A-N"	Vinnie (Max Casella) is disturbed to learn his college roommate (Gil Cates, Jr.) is gay.
1993	Dream On	HBO	"Pop's Secret"	Martin learns that his father Mickey (Paul Dooley) is gay and that his "roommate" Roger (Dion Anderson) is more than just a roommate.
1993	The Jackie Thomas Show	ABC	"The Forces of Nature"	Jackie is mistakenly "outed" by the tabloids.
1993	The John Larroquette Show	NBC	"The Past Comes Back"	A startled John (John Larroquette) begins questioning his sexuality after another male alcoholic visits to make amends.
1993	Law & Order	NBC	"Manhood"	Police officers fail to respond to an officer's distress call during a shootout because he is gay. "Manhood" was remade as the Law & Order: UK series 2 episode "Samaritan".
1993	Life Goes On	ABC	"Incident on Main"	Gay bashing skinheads beat up Jesse (Chad Lowe) outside an AIDS hospice. Jesse was HIV-positive but heterosexual.
1993	The Mommies	NBC	"I Got the Music in Me"	Caryl (Caryl Kristensen) and Paul (Robin Thomas) worry their son Blake (Ryan Merriman) might be gay when he takes up the flute.
1993	Picket Fences	CBS	"Sugar & Spice"	Kimberly (Holly Marie Combs) exchanges intimate kisses with her friend Lisa Fenn (Alexondra Lee), leading to questions about her sexuality. She turns to her biological mother, who had a lesbian relationship while in college. Before agreeing to air the episode, CBS demanded that producer David E. Kelley reshoot the kissing scene in reduced light.
1993	Picket Fences	CBS	"The Body Politic"	Mayor Bill Pugen (Michael Keenen) fires the town dentist, who is gay and HIV-positive.
1993	Seinfeld	NBC	"The Outing"	Jerry (Jerry Seinfeld) is mistakenly outed as being gay and in a relationship with George by a college journalist.
1993	Seinfeld	NBC	"The Smelly Car"	George learns that his ex-girlfriend is now dating a woman and he blames himself for turning her into a lesbian.
1994	Beverly Hills, 90210	Fox	"Blind Spot"	Steve (Ian Ziering) spots Mike (Jack Armstrong), the president of Steve's fraternity, in a gay coffeehouse. When Steve outs Mike later, the fraternity tries to throw Mike out but Steve speaks up in his defense. The producers screened the episode at several LGBT youth organizations before airing. Executive producer Chuck Rosin and actor Todd Bryant participated in question-and-answer sessions after each screening.
1994	Beverly Hills, 90210	Fox	"Up In Flames"	Steve throws a house party at an abandoned house and Claire inadvertently attracts a large lesbian crowd. When fire breaks out Kelly is trapped with Alison (Sara Melson).
1994	Blossom	NBC	"Double Date"	Joey (Joey Lawrence) is excited to learn he has a secret admirer named Leslie until he finds out that Leslie is really Les (Paul Wittenburg), a fellow player on Joey's baseball team.
1994	The Commish	ABC	"Keeping Secrets"	A recent string of anti-gay hate crimes prompts Officer Hank Radovich (Matthew Ryan) to come out and face homophobia in the police department.
1994	Dream On	HBO	"The Homecoming Queen"	A crush from Martin's past reveals to him that she had always assumed he was gay.
1994	Dream On	HBO	"The Courtship of Martin's Father"	Mickey and Roger break up and Mickey moves in with Martin. Martin admits he is uncomfortable with his father's sexuality but the two come to an understanding.
1994	ER	NBC	"ER Confidential"	Carter helps a suicidal transgender patient.
1994	Evening Shade	CBS	"The Perfect Woman"	Ponder (Ossie Davis) is set up with a beautiful woman (Diahann Carroll) who he learns is transgender.
1994	Frasier	NBC	"The Matchmaker"	New station manager Tom Duran (Eric Lutes) misinterprets Frasier's (Kelsey Grammer) dinner invitation as a date.
1994	Friends	NBC	"The One with the Sonogram at the End"	Ross (David Schwimmer) learns that his ex-wife Carol (Jane Sibbett) is pregnant and going to raise the baby with her partner Susan (Jessica Hecht).
1994	Friends	NBC	"The One Where Nana Dies Twice"	People think that Chandler (Matthew Perry) is gay.
1994	Hearts Afire	CBS	"Birth of a Donation"	Billy Bob (Billy Bob Thornton) gets angry when his friend Jeff (Charles Frank) confirms he is gay. Later he realizes he behaved foolishly.
1994	The John Larroquette Show	NBC	"Dirty Deeds"	John runs into his old college roommate, who is playing Marlene Dietrich in a drag show.
1994	Law & Order	NBC	"Mayhem"	One of the stories involves an innocent man who is afraid to tell the police that he is gay and was with his boyfriend at the time of the crime.
1994	Love & War	CBS	“Bali Ha’i”	Nadine (Joanna Gleason) finds herself incredibly attracted to her literature professor, which is a dilemma since she is married. When out to dinner in a group setting, it's revealed that her professor is gay and attracted to Jack (Jay Thomas).
1994	Lifestories: Families in Crisis	HBO	"More Than Friends: The Coming Out of Heidi Leiter"	Based on the true story of Heidi Leiter, who attended her senior prom in Virginia with her girlfriend.
1994	Living Single	Fox	"They Gotta Have It"	A gay man is a part of a seminar lecture on how to stop being too dependent on men.
1994	Melrose Place	Fox	"Till Death Do Us Part (1)"	Billy's college friend Rob comes to town to serve as his best man. Matt discovers he has something in common with Rob, they are both gay. Billy is stunned to see them kissing in the courtyard.
1994	The Mommies	NBC	"Mr Mommies"	The mommies suspect a stay-at-home dad (Jere Burns) of being a bigamist, a spy or gay.
1994	Murphy Brown	CBS	"Brown vs. the Board of Education"	The "Ducky Lucky Pre-School" representative mistakes Miles as gay and assures him that the pre-school welcomes same-sex parents.
1994	My So-Called Life	ABC	"Guns and Gossip"	After a gunshot goes off in school, Brian is pressured by school authority figures to inform on Rickie, who is suspected of bringing the gun to school; he didn't, but Rickie wants fellow students to think he did, believing that he will be harassed less for his bisexuality.
1994	Ned & Stacey	Fox	"The Gay Cabelleros"	Ned (Thomas Haden Church) pretends to be gay in hopes of keeping an important client.
1994	Northern Exposure	CBS	"I Feel the Earth Move"	Ron and Erick have a commitment ceremony.
1994	NYPD Blue	ABC	"Jumpin' Jack Fleishman"	A transvestite is murdered.
1994	NYPD Blue	ABC	"Rockin' Robin"	A priest's body is located in a park used by male prostitutes.
1994	Party of Five	Fox	"Something Out of Nothing"	Ross (Mitchell Anderson) reveals to Claudia (Lacey Chabert) that he is gay.
1994	Roc	Fox	"Brothers"	Russell Emerson returns for a second visit and announces that he and his husband are relocating to Paris because of America's racism and homophobia.
1994	Roseanne	ABC	"Don't Ask, Don't Tell"	Roseanne visits a gay bar with Nancy and is kissed by Nancy's new girlfriend Sharon (Mariel Hemingway).
1994	Roseanne	ABC	"Skeleton in the Closet"	Leon throws a Halloween party and his gay friends seem to know Fred (Michael O'Keefe) suspiciously well.
1994	The X-Files	Fox	"Gender Bender"	A series of sex crimes leads Special Agents Fox Mulder and Dana Scully to an Amish-inspired alien commune where the murderer is revealed to be a runaway transgender alien.
1995	Babylon 5	Syndicated	"Divided Loyalties"	Ivanova has a strong attraction to Thalia.
1995	Beverly Hills, 90210	Fox	"Girls on the Side"	Kelly learns that Alison has feelings for her.
1995	Beverly Hills, 90210	Fox	"P.S. I Love You"	Alison acknowledges that she is in love with Kelly and rumors about their relationship start circulating. Steve becomes infatuated with the beautiful Elle (Monika Schnarre), only to discover that she is a pre-operative MTF transsexual.
1995	Blossom	NBC	"It Happened One Night"	Nick (Ted Wass) volunteers Blossom (Mayim Bialik) to show his friend's son Fred (Charlie Heath) around the city. Nick later learns that Fred is gay.
1995	Caroline in the City	NBC	"Caroline and the Gay Art Show"	Richard (Malcolm Gets) accidentally participates in an art gallery for gay artists.
1995	Chicago Hope	CBS	"Informed Consent"	Dr. Kronk (Peter Berg) dates Annie (Mia Sara), believing she is the sister of his childhood friend Andy until she advises him that she was Andy.
1995	Diagnosis: Murder	CBS	"All-American Murder"	When a beautiful woman is murdered, Dr. Sloan (Dick Van Dyke) learns that this woman was a male-to-female transgender person who (while still biologically male) was kicked out of the Marines for her sexual orientation.
1995	Empty Nest	NBC	"Single White Male"	Charlie (David Leisure) invites his co-worker Hank (Douglas Sill) to move in with him, not realizing that Hank is gay.
1995	ER	NBC	"Everything Old Is New Again"	Benton (Eriq La Salle) treats a gay man with AIDS.
1995	Fallen Angels	Showtime	"The Professional Man"	Brendan Fraser and Peter Coyote play two-thirds of a murderous gay love triangle.
1995	Friends	NBC	"The One With Phoebe's Husband"	Phoebe's (Lisa Kudrow) husband, a gay Canadian ice dancer she married to help him get his green card, returns. He wants to divorce because he is not really gay and wants to marry another woman.
1995	Grace Under Fire	ABC	"Emmet's Secret"	Grace (Brett Butler) finds out that her former father-in law Emmet (Matt Clark) is gay after seeing him in a gay sports bar.
1995	Grace Under Fire	ABC	"Emmet, We Hardly Knew You"	Emmet dies and his partner Danny (Michael Winters) declares their love for each other at the funeral.
1995	Hearts Afire	CBS	"Mrs. Hartman, Mrs. Hartman"	Deandra and Ruth are travelling across America in an RV and stay with John and Georgie while they are in Washington, D.C..
1995	Highlander: The Series	Syndicated	"Leader of the Pack"	The episode's two immortal villains are cryptically depicted as a gay couple.
1995	Homicide: Life on the Street	NBC	"Hate Crimes"	Neo-Nazis kill a man because he is gay, in a gay neighborhood.
1995	Hudson Street	ABC	"The Man's Man"	Melanie's (Lori Loughlin) ex boyfriend and former pro athlete, Leonard (Jeff Kaake), comes out to her.
1995	In the House	UPN	"Boyz II Men II Women"	Mario (LL Cool J) discovers that an old friend (RuPaul) is a drag queen (who claims to be straight).
1995	The John Larroquette Show	NBC	"An Odd Cup of Tea"	Officer Hampton (Lenny Clarke) gets flowers that he believes are from his male doctor.
1995	Law & Order	NBC	"Pride"	An openly gay city councilman is murdered by a bigoted rival politician.
1995	Living Single	Fox	"Woman to Woman"	Max (Erika Alexander) is upset to find out that her former college roommate is gay and had a crush on her.
1995	Murder One	ABC	"Chapter Nine"	Hoffman (Daniel Benzali) defends a closeted college professor (Richard Schiff) who picked up a hustler in a public restroom. The professor kills himself rather than come out to his wife.
1995	Muscle	The WB	"Episode Five"	Television news anchor Bronwyn Jones (Amy Pietz) comes out during a newscast to thwart an outing attempt. Her station then began using her lesbianism as a promotional gimmick.
1995	The Nanny	CBS	"Oy Vey, You're Gay"	Mr. Sheffield (Charles Shaughnessy) hires a beautiful publicist named Sydney Mercer (Catherine Oxenberg) to improve his image. Fran (Fran Drescher) and C.C. (Lauren Lane) are both fearful that Sheffield is falling in love with Mercer until they learn that she is gay.
1995	NYPD Blue	ABC	"Don We Now Our Gay Apparel"	The detectives investigate the murder of a gay bar owner.
1995	The Outer Limits	Showtime	"Caught in the Act"	An alien takes control of the body of an engaged and chaste college student, causing her to engage in casual sex, prostitution and lesbian sex.
1995	Picket Fences	CBS	"Witness for the Prosecution"	A gay man kills his lover during a visit to Rome by Pope John Paul II and the Pope is sought as a witness.
1995	The Pursuit of Happiness	NBC	"Celebrations in Hell"	Alex Chosek (Brad Garrett), announces he's been gay all his life, to his law firm partner Steve (Tom Amandes).
1995	Roseanne	ABC	"December Bride"	Roseanne plans an outrageous wedding for Leon (Martin Mull) and Scott (Fred Willard).
1995	Seinfeld	NBC	"The Beard"	Elaine (Julia Louis-Dreyfus) tries to convert a gay man who feels that his coworkers need to see him with a girlfriend.
1995	The Single Guy	NBC	"Neighbors"	Jonathan (Jonathan Silverman) stays with his gay neighbors while his apartment goes through extensive repairs.
1995	Star Trek: Deep Space Nine	Syndicated	"Rejoined"	Jadzia Dax (Terry Farrell) is reunited with the mate of a former host and the two struggle with their feelings for one another.
1995	The Jenny Jones Show	Syndicated	"Revealing Same Sex Secret Crush"	Six guests meet their self-proclaimed secret admirers, all of whom are of the same sex.
1996	3rd Rock from the Sun	NBC	"I Enjoy Being a Dick"	Dick (John Lithgow) poses as a woman to sneak into a women-only study group.
1996	3rd Rock from the Sun	NBC	"World's Greatest Dick"	Sally's (Kristen Johnston) gay male dance partner mistakes her for a drag queen.
1996	Arliss	ESPN	"A Man of Our Times"	Arliss (Robert Wuhl) has a client who has entered into a same-sex marriage.
1996	Arliss	ESPN	"Athletes Are Role Models"	Player (Rick Johnson) admits to having sex with a drag queen.
1996	Beverly Hills, 90210	Fox	"A Mate for Life"	Kelly becomes friends with Jimmy (Michael Stoyanov), a gay man dying of AIDS.
1996	Beverly Hills, 90210	Fox	"Pledging My Love"	Jimmy passes away.
1996	The Big Easy	USA	"Cinderfella"	A murder victim was secretly involved with a drag queen.
1996	Boston Common	NBC	"Streetcar Named Denial"	Wyleen has a crush on her acting partner, who is gay.
1996	Can't Hurry Love	CBS	"Valentine's Day Massacred"	Roger and Didi spend Valentine's Day in a gay bar.
1996	Caroline in the City	NBC	"Caroline and Victor/Victoria"	Annie (Amy Pietz) poses as a man to prepare for a "Victor/Victoria" audition.
1996	Chicago Hope	CBS	"Right to Life"	Dr. Kronk treats a female impersonator named Ms. Cherchez LaFemme (Giancarlo Esposito) for AIDS.
1996	Chicago Hope	CBS	"Women on the Verge"	A devastated Annie, forced by a medical condition to stop hormone treatments, commits suicide.
1996	Chicago Hope	CBS	"The Parent Rap"	The parents (Paul McCrane, Cynthia Lynch) of a baby born with ambiguous genitalia must decide whether to have constructive surgery performed to give the child female genitals.
1996	Cybill	CBS	"Three Women & a Dummy"	Cybill attends a party with the waiter (Tim Maculan), hosted by his ex-boyfriend.
1996	Dateline NBC	NBC	"Talk on Trial"	Report on the murder of a gay guest on The Jenny Jones Show.
1996	The Drew Carey Show	ABC	"Drew's the Other Man"	Oswald's (Diedrich Bader) gay coworker reveals he has feeling for him.
1996	Ellen	ABC	"Two Ring Circus"	Barrett (Jack Plotnick) and Peter (Patrick Bristow) have a commitment ceremony.
1996	ER	NBC	"Dead of Winter"	After a nurse confesses to thinking that paramedic, Raul Melendez (Carlos Gómez), is cute, Shep and Carol casually reveal that he is gay.
1996	ER	NBC	"It's Not Easy Being Greene"	Doug is treating a teenager, Ray, suffering from dizziness and headaches. When the medical tests come back normal, Ray reveals that he is gay and closeted. Doug determines that the ailments are stress related. While Doug does not reveal the teenager's homosexuality to his father when he comes to pick him up from the hospital, he does offer Ray support by saying that he can come back and talk to him whenever he would like.
1996	ER	NBC	"The Healers"	Raul dies from his burns after he and his medic partner, Shep, run into a burning building to save multiple children.
1996	ER	NBC	"Random Acts"	Jorja Fox plays a lesbian doctor named Dr. Maggie Doyle.
1996	Frasier	NBC	"The Impossible Dream"	A recurring dream about the station's food critic Gil Chesterton (Edward Hibbert) leads Frasier to question his sexuality.
1996	Friends	NBC	"The One with the Lesbian Wedding"	Carol and Susan have a commitment ceremony. Candace Gingrich appears as the minister who marries them. It was the first lesbian wedding portrayed on U.S. television.
1996	Friends	NBC	"The One with Barry and Mindy's Wedding"	Joey is up for a role in a Warren Beatty film where he kisses another guy. He asks Ross and Chandler if he can practice on them.
1996	Ink	CBS	"Paper Cuts"	Mike and Kelly lay off a lesbian employee.
1996	The John Larroquette Show	NBC	"Happy Endings"	Officer Adam Hampton (Lenny Clarke) comes out.
1996	The Larry Sanders Show	HBO	"Ellen, Or Isn't She?"	Larry (Garry Shandling) plans to convince Ellen DeGeneres to come out on his show but he is not sure if she is actually gay.
1996	Law & Order	NBC	"Deceit"	A lawyer is fired for being gay and then killed to prevent his sex discrimination lawsuit from outing another lawyer.
1996	Living Single	Fox	"Swing Out Sisters"	The girls patronize a gay bar.
1996	Mad About You	NBC	"Ovulation Day"	Paul's sister Debbie (Robin Bartlett) comes out as gay. She has a gynecologist girlfriend named Joan (Suzie Plakson).
1996	Mad About You	NBC	"Dr. Wonderful"	Debbie's parents meet Joan.
1996	Melrose Place	Fox	"Farewell, Mike's Concubine"	Matt asks his current boyfriend Dan (Greg Evigan), to spend the night. Dan wants to take it slow, so he doesn't, and they hug.
1996	Millennium	Fox	"Pilot"	Frank Black (Lance Henriksen) comes out of retirement to help the FBI track down a serial killer who is targeting female strippers and gay men who are cruising for sex at night in a Seattle park.
1996	Moesha	UPN	"Labels"	Moesha (Brandy) figures out on a date with Hakeem's (Lamont Bentley) cousin Omar (Chris Lobban) that Omar is gay and gossips about it at school, jeopardizing her friendship with Hakeem.
1996	Murphy Brown	CBS	"A Comedy of Eros"	Frank's (Joe Regalbuto) play about his love life is transformed on stage into a gay love story.
1996	Nash Bridges	CBS	"Genesis"	Inspector/Lieutenant Joe Dominguez (Cheech Marin), ends up owning a gay bar.
1996	Nash Bridges	CBS	"The Javelin Catcher"	Two investigations, of a series of hate crimes against male prostitutes and of a weapons dealer, intersect when the dealer starts picking up transgender prostitutes.
1996	New York Undercover	Fox	"Without Mercy"	A mercy killer is poisoning patients at an AIDS clinic supposedly to spare them the suffering that her daughter went through.
1996	Picket Fences	CBS	"Bye-Bye, Bey-Bey"	Mayor Laurie Bey (Marlee Matlin) announces that she had a baby for her brother Jerry and his boyfriend Gordy, who plan to raise the baby in the town. Laurie's mother Christine (Louise Fletcher) sues for custody and the couple are gay bashed. Custody is granted to the couple.
1996	The Pretender	NBC	"The Paper Clock"	Jarod Pretends to be a lawyer in California to defend a mentally-challenged man on death row, enlisting the aid of a transvestite cab driver along the way.
1996	Relativity	ABC	"Just One More Thing"	Rhonda's (Lisa Edelstein) live-in girlfriend of two years dumps her and kicks her out of their apartment.
1996	Roseanne	ABC	"Home Is Where the Afghan Is"	Bev (Estelle Parsons) comes out as a lesbian.
1996	Silk Stalkings	CBS	"Compulsion"	A man (Christopher Atkins) murders a wealthy gay couple so he can collect part of their fortune.
1996	Touched by an Angel	CBS	"The Violin Lesson"	Tony Du Bois (Lawrence Monoson) returns to his parents home for Christmas, to tell his homophobic father that he is gay and dying of AIDS. The angels try and persuade the father and son to reconcile and for Tony to understand that God is not the source of bigotry.
1996	Tracey Takes On...	HBO	"Romance"	Chris Warner (Tracey Ullman), girlfriend of pro-golfer Midge Dexter (Julie Kavner), demands that the couple stop hiding their relationship from the public.
1996	Turning Point	ABC	"For Better or Worse: Same-Sex Marriage"	Anchor Diane Sawyer and correspondent Elizabeth Vargas document four same-sex couples marrying.
1996	Wings	NBC	"Sons and Lovers"	Roy's son comes to visit him for his Leap Year birthday and brings along his boyfriend.
1997	Ally McBeal	Fox	"Boy To The World"	Ally takes the case of a young transgender sex worker, Stephanie (Wilson Cruz), charged for solicitation for the third time. Ally is moved by Stephanie's situation and gets her a job at Cage and Fish, which doesn't last. She returns to the street and is killed by a client.
1997	Alright Already	The WB	"Again with the Laser Surgery"	Vaughn (Maury Sterling), pretends to be gay to attract a beautiful model.
1997	Beverly Hills, 90210	Fox	"Santa Knows"	Ben (Esteban Powell), is thrown out of his house by his parents for being a gay teenager. David Silver finds him living in the car wash garage, and befriends him.
1997	Coach	ABC	"A Boy and His Doll"	Howard (Kenneth Kimmins) and Shirley give Timothy a doll but Luther (Jerry Van Dyke) feels the boy should have more masculine influences.
1997	Cosby	CBS	"Older and Out"	Hilton (Bill Cosby) is overjoyed when he meets new friends Chuck (Joseph Bologna) and Larry (Andre De Shields), and joins their "Older and Out" team, unaware that it is a group for older gay athletes.
1997	Dateline NBC	NBC	"Gender Limbo"	Report on intersexuality.
1997	Dr. Quinn, Medicine Woman	CBS	"The Body Electric"	The town welcomes the famous poet Walt Whitman (Donald Moffat) until they learn of his homosexuality.
1997	The Drew Carey Show	ABC	"Man's Best Same-Sex Companion"	Drew (Drew Carey) fakes an insurance claim, listing his dog as his domestic partner. When the claim is challenged he enlists Oswald (Diedrich Bader) to pretend to be his spouse.
1997	The Drew Carey Show	ABC	"Drew's Brother"	Drew discovers that his brother, Steve (John Carroll Lynch), is a cross dresser.
1997	Early Edition	CBS	"The Jury"	Chuck Fishman poses as Gary's boyfriend, to help Gary escape from sequestered jury duty in order to prevent an innocent man from being convicted.
1997	ER	NBC	"Whose Appy Now?"	Doyle comes out to Carter (Noah Wyle) after it becomes clear that he has feelings for her.
1997	Good News	UPN	"Pilot"	Mrs. Dixon's son comes out as gay.
1997	Grace Under Fire	ABC	"Riverboat Queen"	Grace and her business partner find out that their investor is gay.
1997	Living Single	Fox	"Misleading Lady"	Snyclaire (Kim Coles) poses as a man to win a part in a play.
1997	Malcolm & Eddie	UPN	"The Commercial"	A television commercial for the bar accidentally attracts lots of gay patrons.
1997	Married... with Children	Fox	"Lez Be Friends"	Al meets Marcy's (Amanda Bearse) lesbian cousin (also played by Bearse).
1997	The Naked Truth	NBC	"Woman Gets Plastered, Star Gets Even"	Nick (Jonathan Penner) and David (Mark Roberts) pretend to be a gay couple to curry favor with their boss, Les (George Wendt). When he challenges them to kiss and they are unable to their lie is exposed.
1997	The Nanny	CBS	"Danny's Dead and Who's Got the Will"	Fran goes on a date with a gay man (Todd Graff) whose lover's family won't acknowledge their relationship.
1997	The Nanny	CBS	"First Date"	Fran's first official date with Sheffield is at a dinner party hosted by Elton John and his real life boyfriend.
1997	Ned & Stacey	Fox	"Saved by the Belvedere"	Ned's crewmember Jody (Andrew Craig) has a crush on Ned. He leaves Ned a series of increasingly explicit answering machine messages, leading Ned to arm himself with a gun. GLAAD condemned the episode for fostering stereotypes and promoting violence against LGBT people and Fox issued an apology.
1997	NYPD Blue	ABC	"I Love Lucy"	A drag queen seeks the squad's protection from her boyfriend.
1997	NYPD Blue	ABC	"Remembrance of Humps Past"	A deadly bisexual love triangle is featured.
1997	Party of Five	Fox	"I Declare"	Ross (Mitchell Anderson) is dating one of Claudia's (Lacey Chabert) gay teachers, and she outs him to the entire school.
1997	The Practice	ABC	"Betrayal"	The law firm defends Joey Heric (John Larroquette), a colorful gay client on trial for the murder of his lover, a prominent city councilman.
1997	Roseanne	ABC	"Roseanne-feld"	Bev introduces Leon and Scott to her girlfriend, a boozy lounge singer named Joyce (Ruta Lee).
1997	Silk Stalkings	CBS	"Pumped Up"	A woman pretends to be a lesbian so she can seduce and murder her stepmother to prevent her from inheriting her father's money. She acknowledges enjoying the seduction more than she expected.
1997	The Simpsons	Fox	"Homer's Phobia"	After learning that new family friend John (voiced by John Waters) is gay, Homer worries that John will influence Bart to become gay too.
1997	Suddenly Susan	NBC	"A Boy Like That"	Luis's younger brother Carlos (Bruno Campos) arrives from Cuba and comes out.
1997	Temporarily Yours	CBS	"Temptation"	Temp worker Deb (Debi Mazar) thinks her romance novelist boss is sexually harassing her, only to discover that he is gay.
1997	Wings	NBC	"Escape from New York"	Brian (Steven Weber) and Helen (Crystal Bernard) lose all of their money on a New York City trip so Helen enters a drag lip-synching contest as "Hell-in-a-Handbasket".
1998	Ally McBeal	Fox	"The Inmates"	Georgia takes on a case about a heterosexual waiter suing for discrimination and wrongful dismissal when he's fired from his job for not being gay.
1998	Any Day Now	Lifetime	"It's Who You Sleep With"	Rene (Lorraine Toussaint), represents a lesbian couple who can't marry in a public park.
1998	Arli$$	HBO	"My Job Is to Get Jobs"	Theo Holt's football team decides to let him go and there are no other takers for his services. Arliss takes him on as a client and learns about a league-wide rumor that Theo is gay. He resurrects Theo's career as only Arliss can.
1998	Ask Harriet	Fox	"Pilot"	A sexist hetero sportswriter, Jack Cody (Anthony Tyler Quinn), dons drag as female columnist.
1998	Beverly Hills, 90210	Fox	"Crimes and Misdemeanors"	Steve (Ian Ziering) believes that he has secured a double date for Brandon (Jason Priestley) and him. He fails to realize that the women are a lesbian couple who believe the guys are also gay.
1998	Beverly Hills, 90210	Fox	"The Nature of Nurture"	Kelly (Jennie Garth) is upset when a gay couple receives custody of an abandoned baby left outside of the clinic. The teenage mother who abandoned the baby decides that she wants her son back, but only because she does not want him raised by gay men.
1998	Beverly Hills, 90210	Fox	"I'm Back Because"	Steve (Ian Ziering) is upset at the news that his mother is dating a much younger man. Steve sees the man kissing another woman and starts a fight. Samantha (Christine Belford) reveals that she is not seeing the man; she is actually a lesbian.
1998	Beverly Hills, 90210	Fox	"The Following Options"	Samantha is fired from her new show by the network, after she comes out as a lesbian. Samantha is apprehensive that Steve is ashamed of her.
1998	Brooklyn South	CBS	"Gay Avec"	An Internal Affairs officer questions an off-duty cop's statement about a shooting in a gay bar and suspects that Santoro (Gary Basaraba) might be gay.
1998	Brooklyn South	CBS	"Doggonit"	Police detectives interview a man who comes into the precinct station to tell them that his gay lover has a gun to his dog's head and is threatening to go on a rampage.
1998	Buffy the Vampire Slayer	The WB and UPN	"Phases"	Xander figures that Larry is the most obvious suspect because of the dog bite. When he confronts Larry alone in the gym locker room, it turns out that he really is hiding his homosexuality. Xander unwittingly leaves Larry with the impression that Xander is gay, too.
1998	Caroline in the City	NBC	"Caroline and the Little White Lies"	Del (Eric Lutes) and Charlie (Andy Lauer) pose as a gay couple to get cheaper health insurance, but the lie spirals out of control.
1998	Chicago Hope	CBS	"Austin Space"	Orthodox Jewish teenager Jacob (Michael A. Goorjian), is afraid to tell his father, a Rabbi, that he is gay, believing that his father will consider him "dead" because of his so-called sin.
1998	Cybill	CBS	"Whose Wife Am I, Anyway?"	The acerbic and riotous unnamed gay waiter (Tim Maculan) at Cybill's favorite restaurant, is nervous about telling his parents that he is gay, so he introduces Cybill as his fiancée.
1998	Damon	Fox	"The Designer"	Damon goes undercover as a gay fashion designer.
1998	Dharma & Greg	ABC	"Invasion of the Buddy Snatcher"	Dharma (Jenna Elfman) discovers that one of Greg's (Thomas Gibson) poker buddies is gay and has a crush on him.
1998	Dr. Katz, Professional Therapist	Comedy Central	"Alderman"	Patient (Louis C.K.) describes a gay dream.
1998	Ellen	ABC	"It's a Gay, Gay, Gay, Gay World!"	Accidental exposure to bug spray sends Spence (Jeremy Piven), into a dream world where what's gay is straight and what's straight is gay.
1998	ER	NBC	"Split Second"	Gay nurse, Yosh (Gedde Watanabe), who for a time was the only gay Asian male on television, is called a "Chinese Fag" by a racist and homophobic patient. Yosh matter-of-factly responds with "Japanese" before exiting.
1998	ER	NBC	"Masquerade"	One storyline involves an intersex child.
1998	ER	NBC	"Stuck on You"	Greene saves the life of a gay prostitute and counsels him on getting his life back on track.
1998	Fame L.A.	"Syndication"	"Duet"	Ryan (Christian Kane) begins dating a bisexual woman.
1998	For Your Love	The WB	"The House of Cards"	Sheri's (Dedee Pfeiffer) gay friend Tom (Jason Bateman), comes to visit and Dean (D.W. Moffett) gets jealous.
1998	Frasier	NBC	"The Ski Lodge"	Roz invites the crew on a ski trip. There they meet Guy (James Patrick Stuart), a gay ski instructor, who likes Niles and thinks Niles likes him back. This is confirmed by misinformation given by Martin who has hearing difficulty due to a blocked ear. Throughout the episode, confusion arises as Frasier pursues Annie, who desires Niles. Niles, however, longs to confess his feelings for Daphne, while Daphne attempts to pick up Guy, who thinks that Daphne and Annie are together.
1998	Getting Personal	Fox	"Chasing Sammy"	Milo (Duane Martin) pretends that he is gay in order to win a potential client for the advertising agency where he works.
1998	Guys Like Us	UPN	"In & Out"	Sean (Chris Hardwick) pretends his gay in order to get close a woman he has a crush on.
1998	Holding the Baby	Fox	"The Gay Divorcee"	Kelly (Jennifer Westfeldt) makes Gordon's (Jon Patrick Walker) date think that he is gay.
1998	L.A. Doctors	CBS	"Under the Radar"	Dr. Tim Lonner buys Marijuana to help treat a friend/patient with AIDS.
1998	Love Boat: The Next Wave	UPN	"Smooth Sailing"	Josh (Doug Savant) was stood up by his fiancée, so he takes their honeymoon with his friend, Luke (Jason Brooks), which makes the girls believe they are gay, and flock to the hunks.
1998	Mad About You	NBC	"Tragedy Plus Time"	Debbie is not sure if she should marry Joan.
1998	Party of Five	Fox	"Here and Now"	Sarah's (Jennifer Love Hewitt) new boyfriend is gay. Elliot comes out of the closet to Bailey.
1998	The Practice	ABC	"Another Day"	Joey Herric (John Larroquette) returns, having killed yet another one of his lovers by stabbing him in the chest. Herric first appeared in episode "Betrayal".
1998	Sex and the City	HBO	"Bay of Married Pigs"	Miranda (Cynthia Nixon) is set up on a blind date with a lesbian at her company softball game. She is surprised that people think she is a lesbian, but plays along when her and her "lover" are invited to a dinner party.
1998	Sex and the City	HBO	"Three's a Crowd"	Charlotte's boyfriend wants to have a threesome, and Samantha declines an offer for a threesome when she becomes involved with a married man, and his wife suggests they have a threesome to keep the marriage together.
1998	Sex and the City	HBO	"The Turtle and the Hare"	Stanford Blatch (Willie Garson), who is gay, proposes to Carrie (Sarah Jessica Parker) in order to please his grandmother and inherit his part of the family fortune.
1999	Action	Fox	"Blowhard"	Cole Riccardi (Richard Burgi), a famous action star, comes out as gay.
1999	Any Day Now	Lifetime	"Family Is Family"	Renee's gay brother visits with his son, and his lover.
1999	Beggars and Choosers	Showtime	"The Velvet Curtain"	Malcolm (Tuc Watkins) goes on a political talk show to discuss the "velvet curtain," or the discrimination that gays face in Hollywood. Malcolm is the most diplomatic of the talk show's guests, but when a conservative Senator starts getting blatantly offensive in his comments, Malcolm outs himself on national television.
1999	Beverly Hills, 90210	Fox	"The Loo-Ouch"	Samantha brings her girlfirend to Steve's party.
1999	Beverly Hills, 90210	Fox	"Baby, You Can Drive My Car"	Dylan and his friend Andrew (Robb Derringer) are attacked by gay bashers. Andrew does not want to help put away their attackers because he has yet to come out. His boss finds out that he is gay and puts him on leave.
1999	Beverly Hills, 90210	Fox	"Family Tree"	Dylan helps Andrew get his job back.
1999	Dawson's Creek	The WB	"To Be or Not to Be..."	Jack bears his soul in an English assignment and is forced to expose his innermost secrets while reading his poem aloud in class; the poem alludes to feelings that Jack has towards another boy.
1999	Dawson's Creek	The WB	"...That Is the Question"	After reading his poem aloud in English class, Jack confronts his innermost secrets. He realizes that he is in fact gay, formally coming out to his supportive sister and less-supportive father.
1999	Dawson's Creek	The WB	"First Encounters of the Close Kind"	On a visit to Boston, Jack takes a risk and explores the local gay community. The weekend ends with Jack bonding with a gay man.
1999	Felicity	The WB	"Love and Marriage"	Noel gets a visit from his brother Ryan (Eddie McClintock), who comes out as gay. Noel is shocked.
1999	Frasier	NBC	"IQ"	Jody (Carolee Carmello) has feelings for Roz.
1999	Grown Ups	UPN	"Pilot"	J's (Jaleel White) new roommate thinks he's gay.
1999	Homicide: Life on the Street	NBC	"Truth Will Out"	Bayliss (Kyle Secor), is the subject of rumors about his bisexuality, after word spreads about his personal website, which includes his musings on sexual matters. Warned to take it down or risk jeopardizing his career, and upset about a rejection by a gay sergeant, he decides to shut the site down.
1999	L.A. Doctors	CBS	"Been There, Done That"	Dr. Church's teen female patient has been self-medicating to transition.
1999	NYPD Blue	ABC	"Raphael's Inferno"	Detectives assist an elderly man who believes that his young transgender girlfriend was pressured into embezzling money from him.
1999	Party of Five	Fox	"I'll Show You Mine"	Julia moves closer to her writing professor, Perry, and ends up kissing her.
1999	Sex and the City	HBO	"Old Dogs, New Dicks"	Samantha (Kim Cattrall ) is rattled after running into an ex-boyfriend, a former hockey player, who is now a drag queen named after her.
1999	Sex and the City	HBO	"Evolution"	Charlotte (Kristin Davis) dates Stefan (Dan Futterman), a pastry chef who she mistakenly thought was gay but is, in his own words, a "gay straight man".
1999	Snoops	ABC	"Constitution"	A future father-in-law suspects a man of being gay and hires Snoops detective agency to find out. Turns out he's actually a gay basher.
1999	Spin City	ABC	"These Shoes Were Made for Cheatin"	Stuart (Alan Ruck) joins a gay gym.
1999	The West Wing	NBC	"In Excelsis Deo"	C. J. Cregg (Allison Janney) gets emotionally involved in a story about a gay high school student beaten to death by a group of thirteen year olds. She sees this as an opportunity to push hate crime legislation, but the suggestion finds little support among the staff.

== See also ==
- List of pre–Stonewall riots American television episodes with LGBT themes
- List of 1970s American television episodes with LGBT themes
- List of 1980s American television episodes with LGBT themes

== Sources ==
- Becker, Ron (2006). Gay TV and Straight America. Rutgers University Press. ISBN 978-0-8135-3689-7.
- Capsuto, Steven (2000). Alternate Channels: The Uncensored Story of Gay and Lesbian Images on Radio and Television. New York: Ballantine Books. ISBN 0-345-41243-5. LCCN 00104495. OCLC 44596808.
- Castañeda, Laura; Campbell, Shannon B. (2005). News and Sexuality: Media Portraits of Diversity. SAGE Publications. ISBN 978-1-4129-0999-0.
- Cortese, Anthony Joseph Paul (2006). Opposing Hate Speech. Foreword by Richard Delgado. Praeger Publishers. ISBN 0-275-98427-3. LCCN 2005019176. OCLC 849085841.
- Danuta Walters, Suzanna (2001). All The Rage: The Story Of Gay Visibility In America. University of Chicago Press. ISBN 0-226-87231-9. LCCN 2001001665. OCLC 46500686.
- Tropiano, Stephen (2002). The Prime Time Closet: A History of Gays and Lesbians on TV. New York: Applause Theatre & Cinema Books. ISBN 1-55783-557-8. LCCN 2002003220. OCLC 606827696.
