= He's a Crowd =

- L.A. Law episode
- C.J. and Abby kiss in "He's a Crowd", the first "lesbian kiss episode".
- Episode no.: Season 5 Episode 12
- Directed by: Elodie Keene
- Written by: David E. Kelley
- Original air date: February 7, 1991
- Running time: 60 min.

Episode chronology
← Previous "Rest in Pieces"	Next → "Dances with Sharks"

"He's a Crowd" is a 1991 episode of the American legal drama L.A. Law. In it, attorney Michael Kuzak defends a man with multiple personalities accused of murder, attorney Rosalind Shays helps her lover Leland McKenzie help a client, attorney Arnie Becker's divorce proceeds and attorneys Abby Perkins and C.J. Lamb work together to raise Abby's profile at the firm and find themselves sharing an intimate moment. It is the 12th episode of season 5 and was written by David E. Kelley.

"He's a Crowd" is the first of a series of lesbian kiss episodes, in which a female character who identifies as lesbian or bisexual kisses a female character who identifies as heterosexual. The episode generated some controversy when it aired, with a handful of advertisers removing their commercials from the broadcast. Although later episodes of the season indicated that a romantic relationship between Abby and C.J. might develop, it did not and Michele Greene, who played Abby, departed the series at the end of the season.

== Plot ==
Michael Kuzak defends Gregory Edmonson, a man with multiple personalities, from charges that he murdered his girlfriend. Testimony from one of his alternate personalities indicates that another personality, Sean, committed the murder. However, under stress a previously unknown personality, a woman named Camille Green, emerges and confesses that she committed the murder because Gregory's girlfriend had caused him pain by breaking off their relationship. She also murdered Gregory's father, a death long thought to have been suicide. Rather than allow either Gregory or Sean to suffer in prison, Camille puts them "to sleep" and becomes the dominant personality.

A long-term client comes to Leland McKenzie, concerned that a member of his board of directors is trying to force him out of the company he founded. Leland, his lover Rosalind Shays and attorney Anne Kelsey work together to prove that the board member is corrupt and force him out instead.

Arnie Becker's divorce from Corrinne moves forward and Arnie fires long-time secretary Roxanne Melman after she is forced to give a deposition about his extra-marital affairs. Managing Partner Douglas Brackman hires her as the new office manager.

After being passed over for a partnership, attorney Abby Perkins works with C.J. Lamb to increase Abby's revenue from her work. After a celebratory dinner, the two share an intimate kiss. While initially surprised, Abby expresses some interest in exploring the situation.

== Lesbian kiss episode ==
"He's a Crowd" was the first in a series of "lesbian kiss episodes", in which a lesbian or bisexual character kisses a female character identified as heterosexual. (Note: 21 Jump Street included a kiss between series regular Holly Robinson Peete and guest star Katy Boyer in "A Change of Heart" (1990) but it did not inspire the critical or popular attention later such kisses would engender (Capsuto, p. 235).) C.J. Lamb (Amanda Donohoe) describes her sexuality as "flexible" and Abby Perkins (Michele Greene) is portrayed as heterosexual. NBC stated that it did not intend the episode to establish a lesbian character but was simply an attempt to add "texture" to Lamb's character. There was some advertiser backlash. Around five sponsors pulled their ads from the episode, but NBC was able to replace them, albeit at a reduced rate. Donald Wildmon of the American Family Association called for advertiser boycotts and letter-writing campaigns. However, NBC only received 85 phone calls about the episode on the night of broadcast and almost half of them were supportive. Speaking of the potential for viewer and advertiser backlash, L. A. Law producer Patricia Green said, "There are probably twenty-five million gay people out there, all of whom have friends and relatives and loved ones. That is so many more people than those…who are liable to be offended by it that, to us, the advertiser saying ‘We lose business’ is irrelevant. It’s a perception, not a fact." The Gay and Lesbian Alliance Against Defamation (now GLAAD) praised the episode and noted that Lamb was then the only lesbian or bisexual series regular on American television. The kiss was mentioned in virtually every story about L.A. Law for months afterward.

Later episodes seemed to indicate that C.J. and Abby were interested in exploring a romantic relationship. However, Greene left the series at the end of the season. A female former lover of C.J.'s was introduced in one episode of the following season ("The Nut Before Christmas") but as the season progressed C.J. became involved with a male attorney. Donohoe left L.A. Law at the end of season six and in the season seven opener it is mentioned that C.J. has left the firm to join the LPGA.

In the years following "He's a Crowd", several American television series included episodes in which an ostensibly heterosexual female character kisses or is kissed by a character who is apparently lesbian or bisexual. These often occurred during "sweeps" periods, times when the Nielsen ratings are used by broadcasters to set advertising rates. The New York Times, examining the practice, concluded that "kisses between women are perfect sweeps stunts". Other early lesbian kiss episodes that sparked controversy included "Sugar and Spice", a 1993 episode of the series Picket Fences that David E. Kelley also wrote, and "Don't Ask, Don't Tell", an episode of Roseanne that aired in 1994. Michele Greene confirmed in an interview with the lesbian-interest website AfterEllen.com that her character's kiss with C.J. was indeed a ratings ploy and that there was never any intention on the part of producers to seriously explore the possibility of a relationship between two women.

== See also ==
- List of American television episodes with LGBT themes, 1990–1997
- Media portrayal of lesbianism
