= List of Picket Fences episodes =

This is a list of Picket Fences episodes, in the order that they originally aired on CBS. It had four seasons, the first consisting with 23 episodes, and the others consisting of 22 episodes. The series premiered on September 18, 1992.

== Series overview ==
Season	Episodes	Originally released	
Season	Episodes	First released	Last released
1	23	September 18, 1992	May 6, 1993
2	22	October 22, 1993	May 13, 1994
3	22	September 23, 1994	May 12, 1995
4	22	September 22, 1995	June 26, 1996

== Episodes ==
=== Season 1 (1992–93) ===
No. overall	No. in season	Title	Directed by	Written by	Original release date	Prod. code
1	1	"Pilot"	Ron Lagomarsino	David E. Kelley	September 18, 1992	9K79
2	2	"Pilot"	Ron Lagomarsino	David E. Kelley	September 18, 1992	9K79
A beloved local man is killed during a stage production of The Wizard of Oz. Suspicion initially falls on the town pharmacist when the sheriff learns the dead man was having an affair with the pharmacist's daughter. The dead man's wife confesses but her confession is suppressed in court. She is then murdered and the Sheriff's department discovers that she and the pharmacist conspired to kill her husband and then the pharmacist killed her.
3	3	"The Green Bay Chopper"	Michael Pressman	David E. Kelley	September 25, 1992	9K01
After a child brings a severed human hand to school for show and tell, the Sheriff's department teams with the FBI to pursue a serial kidnapper, the "Green Bay Chopper", who severs the right hands of his victims.
4	4	"Mr. Dreeb Comes to Town"	Jeremy Kagan	David E. Kelley	October 2, 1992	9K03
Max falls for a dwarf (Michael J. Anderson) who rides into town on an elephant, which the dwarf says was being abused at a circus. Jill tells Kimberly's favorite teacher, Mr. Pankow, that he has a brain tumor.
5	5	"The Autumn of Rome"	Tom Moore	David E. Kelley	October 16, 1992	9K02
The candidates in the upcoming mayoral election are using such outrageous smear campaigns that Sheriff Brock considers running for mayor himself.
6	6	"Frank the Potato Man"	Ron Lagomarsino	David E. Kelley & Mark B. Perry	October 23, 1992	9K04
A rash of break-ins leads to an investigation of a "serial bather". Suspicion initially centers on "Frank the Potato Man" (David Proval), who, it is learned, was arrested for aggravated rape 15 years earlier.
7	7	"Remembering Rosemary"	Donald Petrie	David E. Kelley	October 26, 1992	9K05
When a catatonic housemaid utters the word "murder" after a decade of not speaking, the Sheriff's department learns that the "suicide" of a beloved town figure a decade prior was actually a homicide.
8	8	"The Contenders"	Mel Damski	David E. Kelley & David Assael	October 30, 1992	9K06
Town doctor Jill Brock, fed up with the mayor's failure to address women's issues, declares herself a write-in candidate in the upcoming mayoral election. Deputy Kenny Lakos arrests a former boxing world champion (Henry Brown) and convinces him to engage in a charity match before extradition to New Jersey.
9	9	"Sacred Hearts"	Tom Moore	David E. Kelley & Mark B. Perry	November 6, 1992	9K07
An elderly patient is murdered at a nursing home. A "singing serial mercy-killing" nun is arrested, sparking controversy over the ethics and legality of euthanasia.
10	10	"Thanksgiving"	Michael Pressman	David E. Kelley	November 13, 1992	9K08
Jill's father (Richard Kiley) arrives in Rome with his new 26-year-old girlfriend (Stacey Travis). Wambaugh finds his wife Myriam (Ann Morgan Guilbert) in bed with another man.
11	11	"The Snake Lady"	Joan Tewkesbury	David E. Kelley	December 4, 1992	9K10
Max, Brock, and Kenny investigate the mysterious death of a woman who may or may not have committed suicide.
12	12	"Pageantry"	Mel Damski	David E. Kelley & Mark B. Perry	December 11, 1992	9K09
A rabbi seeks to block the town from staging a religiously-themed Christmas pageant on public property. The town is shocked to learn that beloved teacher Louise Talbot, scheduled to play the Virgin Mary in the pageant, is a post-operative trans woman. The discovery pits Jimmy and Jill against each other as Louise's future as teacher is in question.
13	13	"High Tidings"	Oz Scott	David E. Kelley	December 18, 1992	9K11
When the Brock family inadvertently finds Kimberly having sex with her 19-year-old boyfriend on Christmas Eve, Jimmy wants to prosecute him for statutory rape. A man claiming to be Santa Claus takes Max and dispatcher Ginny hostage and Jimmy tries to talk him down.
14	14	"Frog Man"	Michael Schultz	David E. Kelley & Mark B. Perry	January 8, 1993	9K12
Kenny is seriously wounded by the Frog Man, a burglar who leaves live frogs at the site of his crimes.
15	15	"Bad Moons Rising"	Alan Myerson	David E. Kelley	January 15, 1993	9K13
When Alice Freeman is charged with murder in the death of her husband, Wambaugh defends her by claiming insanity as the result of menopause. Brock's son, Matthew, begins to experience puberty.
16	16	"Nuclear Meltdowns"	Jeremy Kagan	David E. Kelley	January 22, 1993	9K14
When her friend becomes pregnant, Kimberly fears that she is the victim of incest. However, the man purporting to be her father is actually her husband and they are involved in a polygamous relationship. Max investigates a religious sect that engages in animal sacrifice. Guest Stars: Liz and Jean Sagal
17	17	"The Body Politic"	Mel Damski	David E. Kelley	February 5, 1993	9K15
A fugitive doctor seeks a court order to allow him to keep his brain-dead wife on life support to allow her to bring her pregnancy to term. The mayor fires the town dentist for refusing to disclose that he is HIV-positive. Guest Stars: Liz and Jean Sagal
18	18	"Be My Valentine"	Dan Lerner	David E. Kelley	February 12, 1993	9K16
Deputy Max goes undercover when a response to her personal ad leads her to believe that she is being targeted by a serial killer known as "Cupid."
19	19	"Fetal Attraction"	Martin Davidson	David E. Kelley	April 1, 1993	9K17
Jill enlists her former fiancé to perform a fetal transplant on a patient with Parkinson's disease over the objections of the town hospital. Jimmy feels threatened when he catches Jill and her former fiancé exchanging a kiss.
20	20	"Sightings"	Elliot Silverstein	Kimberly Costello	April 8, 1993	9K18
Carter believes a sheriff who mysteriously disappeared 38 years earlier may have been killed by radiation emitted by an Unidentified Flying Object.
21	21	"Rights of Passage"	Michael Fresco	David E. Kelley	April 15, 1993	9K19
A group of heavily armed Chippewa Indians declares war on Rome, seizes, and forts up in the courthouse. Ginny stages a protest when Jill begins administering growth hormones to a short boy. Matthew takes on the school bully.
22	22	"Sugar & Spice"	Alan Myerson	David E. Kelley	April 29, 1993	9K20
Kimberly and her best female friend exchange a few kisses during a sleepover, leading to rumors that Kimberly is a lesbian. She turns to her birth mother, who had a lesbian affair in college, for advice.
23	23	"The Lullaby League"	Michael Pressman	David E. Kelley	May 6, 1993	9K21
Max delivers a baby and begins adoption procedures when the natural mother disappears. Jill transplants a pig's liver into a blues vocalist after the woman collapses on stage. Guest star: Della Reese.

=== Season 2 (1993–94) ===
No. overall	No. in season	Title	Directed by	Written by	Original release date	Prod. code
24	1	"Turpitude"	Michael Pressman	David E. Kelley	October 22, 1993	1K01
Mayor Pugen kills a carjacker after the carjacker drops his weapon and Sheriff Brock must decide whether to press murder charges. When he does, the new district attorney has to choose how to prosecute the case.
25	2	"Duty Free Rome"	Ron Lagomarsino	David E. Kelley	October 28, 1993	1K02
Douglas Wambaugh appeals Mayor Pugen's murder conviction but the mayor spontaneously combusts. A Catholic couple who carry the genes for Hurler syndrome are tormented by the church's prohibition on contraception. Max's therapist attempts to manipulate her into a sexual relationship and she has him arrested.
26	3	"Unlawful Entries"	Mel Damski	Larry Moskowitz & David E. Kelley	October 29, 1993	1K03
Kenny and Max respond to a report of a rape and find a man and woman (Alan Ruck and Brenda Strong) fighting. Under pressure from Kenny, the man says that it was she who raped him. Following a probable cause hearing, Judge Bone advises the district attorney and Wambaugh to reach a plea bargain. The woman gets a year sentence, suspended, after pleading guilty to misdemeanor assault. Local businesswoman Rachel Harris (Leigh Taylor-Young) is sworn in as mayor, and she and Jimmy clash over her plans for his office. Max's former therapist manipulates her into dropping charges and they enter into a sexual relationship.
27	4	"Under the Influence"	Michael Schultz	Geoffrey Neigher & Ann Donahue & David E. Kelley	November 5, 1993	1K04
Max pulls over a drunk driver (Jane Daly) but allows her to drive the short distance to her home. The woman then crashes into another driver, causing his paralysis. The situation is complicated by Wambaugh's advice to the drunk driver to drink some Scotch to "calm her nerves", and Max's relationship with her therapist (Matt Salinger). The mayor accuses Jimmy of having problems with having a woman as his boss.
28	5	"The Dancing Bandit"	Lou Antonio	David E. Kelley	November 12, 1993	1K06
Jill and Zack are among the hostages taken by a group of bank robbers led by a deaf woman (Marlee Matlin) who calls herself "the Dancing Bandit." Jimmy works with the FBI to stop the standoff, but the group proves far craftier than anyone expected.
29	6	"Dairy Queen"	Mel Damski	Michael Sardo & David E. Kelley	November 26, 1993	1K05
The town is divided when Jill and the Mayor back a sexy model (Megan Gallagher) to be the town's "Dairy Queen", but Sheriff Brock is more interested in the woman's apparently abusive husband and manager. Kimberly and Matthew work on a documentary called "A Day in the Life of a C-Cup", but Kimberly finds herself considering drastic options after seeing how people treat her.
30	7	"Cross Examination"	Oz Scott	Story by : David E. Kelley & Jeremy R. Littman; Teleplay by : David E. Kelley	December 3, 1993	1K08
A young woman in a coma following a car accident is found to be four months' pregnant, despite being a virgin. When her father seeks an abortion to try to save her life, the town's Catholic and Protestant clergy intervene, citing possible divine causation. Matthew tells Zack that there is no Santa Claus.
31	8	"Strangers"	Kristoffer Tabori	Sonny Gordon & David E. Kelley	December 10, 1993	1K07
Jill testifies for a man (Robert Desiderio) suffering from a rare neurological disorder that distorts vision after he is arrested for the shooting death of his brother. Dr. Vernon Leaky (Arthur Malet), a specialist on the condition, shows a romantic interest in Ginny. Maxine learns that Kenny and Rachel are having an affair.
32	9	"Blue Christmas"	Alan Myerson	Ann Donahue & Geoffrey Neigher & David E. Kelley	December 17, 1993	1K09
A locker search for drugs at the local high school leads to the arrest of Kimberly's best friend, Lisa Fenn (Alexondra Lee). Meanwhile, a protected federal witness turns up in Rome, which leaves Sheriff Brock and his force concerned. Also, Carter has a melancholy reunion with his brother (Charles Martin Smith) when he arrives in Rome for the funeral of their mother.
33	10	"Paging Doctor God"	Lorraine Senna Ferrara	David E. Kelley	January 7, 1994	1K10
Jill is arrested after she performs surgery on a woman whose Christian Science beliefs prohibit medical intervention. Zach wants to convert to Judaism because Jews do not believe in hell.
34	11	"Guns 'R' Us"	James Frawley	Geoffrey Neigher & Ann Donahue & David E. Kelley	January 14, 1994	1K11
Matthew's attempts to get revenge for a humiliation by some high school bullies by threatening them with a gun takes an unexpected turn, which lands one of them in the hospital and Matthew in jail for attempted murder. The situation goes from bad to worse when the victim's brother shoots Matthew in revenge, forcing several major decisions from the department as well as a potentially life changing event for the Brocks. Meanwhile, Mayor Harris' decision to roll back deputy salaries inspires a round of "blue flu", a strike undertaken by the police officers by simultaneously taking sick leave.
35	12	"Remote Control"	Michael Pressman	David E. Kelley	January 21, 1994	1K12
Littleton and Wambaugh go head to head again in the courtroom as Wambaugh argues that his latest client, Timmy Hendricks, was predisposed to violence because of his exposure to television and movies. Meanwhile, Sheriff Brock reacts with anger against Mayor Harris' attempts to impose a strong police presence in Rome, including fingerprinting all the citizens and random searches of vehicles for weapons, despite Matthew nearly being paralyzed from being shot.
36	13	"Abominable Snowman"	Bill D'Elia	David E. Kelley	January 28, 1994	1K13
Howard Buss's son Kevin will die without a heart transplant so Howard, suffering from Alzheimer's disease, seeks a court order to allow him the right to assisted suicide so he can give his heart to his son. Frank the Potato Man sues the town for a place to live, claiming an implied social contract.
37	14	"Supreme Courting"	Michael Schultz	David E. Kelley	February 4, 1994	1K14
Valentine's Day brings romance to many members of the community. Maxine helps Carter woo Stacy Halford (Barbara Alyn Woods), a local widow. Kimberly and her boyfriend find they have different attitudes regarding sexual-consent guidelines, and Zack takes a dare and kisses his girlfriend only to find himself in trouble.
38	15	"Divine Recall"	Mel Damski	David E. Kelley	February 11, 1994	1K15
A 25-year-old softcore pornographic video of Mayor Rachel Harris surfaces. The town clergy lead a movement to remove her from office. Howard Buss, as senior member of the town council, becomes acting mayor.
39	16	"Terms of Estrangement"	Andre R. Guttfreund	Ann Donahue & Geoffrey Neigher & Larry Moskowitz & David E. Kelley	March 4, 1994	1K16
Kimberly is kidnapped and held hostage by a man (Louis Gossett Jr.) who wants revenge over Jimmy for testifying against him nine years earlier.
40	17	"Squatter's Rights"	Lou Antonio	David E. Kelley	March 11, 1994	1K17
A 500-pound woman (Darlene Cates) confesses to murdering her husband by sitting on his head. Douglas Wambaugh is expelled from his synagogue and seeks a ruling in a Jewish rabbinical court (Barry Primus, Tony Jay, and Harvey Jason) to be reinstated.
41	18	"System Down"	Alan Myerson	David E. Kelley	April 1, 1994	1K18
A high-profile murder trial in which the defendant is accused of murdering two police officers is transferred to Rome. Attorney Bryant Thomas (James Earl Jones) and Wabaugh defend him. Sheriff Brock is selected as a juror for the murder trial. One juror (Michael O'Neill) argues strongly to convict.
42	19	"Buried Alive"	David Jones	David E. Kelley	April 8, 1994	1K19
Max arrests Jill's father (Richard Kiley). The Brocks invite her to dinner in hopes of smoothing things over but end up confronting their own issues with each other as well.
43	20	"My Left Shoe"	Bethany Rooney	David E. Kelley & Geoffrey Neigher & Ann Donahue	April 29, 1994	1K20
The town learns of Father Gary Barrett's fetish for women's shoes following a fire in the church rectory. Matthew has been having sexual fantasies, and he fears his sexual feelings are a sin.
44	21	"Frosted Flakes"	Dennis Dugan	David E. Kelley & Larry Moskowitz & Sean O'Byrne	May 6, 1994	1K21
The parents of a boy (Phillip Van Dyke) dying of leukemia seek a court order to allow them to place the child in cryonic suspension.
45	22	"Howard's End"	David Jones	David E. Kelley	May 13, 1994	1K22
Howard Buss' Alzheimer's disease worsens, and his anguished son Kevin shoots him to death. Kevin is put on trial for murder.

=== Season 3 (1994–95) ===
No. overall	No. in season	Title	Directed by	Written by	Original release date	Prod. code
46	1	"Survival of the Fittest"	Ron Lagomarsino	David E. Kelley	September 23, 1994	2K01
A local girl disappears and Sheriff Brock suspects her boyfriend, Brian Latham, is involved. Meanwhile, Jill opposes a grade school teacher who is teaching creationism.
47	2	"Systematic Abuse"	Michael Schultz	David E. Kelley	September 30, 1994	2K02
District Attorney Littleton and defense lawyer Douglas Wambaugh prepare for the upcoming murder trial of Brian Latham. Littleton is concerned that his case will be hampered by the absence of hard evidence.
48	3	"The Bus Stops Here: Part 1"	Michael Pressman	David E. Kelley	October 7, 1994	2K03
A Wisconsin Federal judge (Paul Winfield) orders that 400 black students from Green Bay be bused to Rome's schools, prompting panic among Sheriff Brock and the parents, assuming that many of them are lowlifes and drug dealers. Meanwhile, Wambaugh gets a surprising response to his appeal of the Brian Latham murder conviction to go the U.S. Supreme Court in Washington D.C. Also, Maxine makes a mess of her relationship with Littleton.
49	4	"Enemy Lines: Part 2"	James Frawley	David E. Kelley & Ann Donahue	October 14, 1994	2K04
Jill and Judge Nance air their feelings in a heated face-to-face exchange after she is arrested for violating a federal court order to start busing 400 inner-city black kids from a high-gang area of Green Bay to attend Rome's schools. During the exchanges, Nance reveals a tragic reason animating his hard busing push. Meanwhile, Kimberly has a run-in with one of Green Bay's transfer students, named Aisha, who initially responds with hostility. Also, Littleton asks Maxine out on a date.
50	5	"Cold Spell"	Lou Antonio	Nick Carter & David E. Kelley	October 28, 1994	2K05
After a young girl spray paints a pentacle on a wall at school, Sheriff Brock removes her from the custody of her mother (Barbara Williams), a practicing Wiccan, and a court custody battle ensues. Max and Kenny discover Ginny frozen to death in her own freezer. Her brother (played by Paul Williams) holds a memorial service, where he sings "The Rainbow Connection" (a song written by Williams for The Muppet Movie).
51	6	"Elective Conduct"	Rachel Feldman	David Mills & David E. Kelley	November 4, 1994	2K06
Jill's mayoral campaign is damaged when Zach writes a school report filled with racist content, which he copied from an out-of-date book. Kimberly befriends Aisha when other black teenagers (Terrence Howard and Vicellous Reon Shannon) bully her over her good grades. Matthew makes a new friend (Wade Robson) who acts like a caricature of black teenagers.
52	7	"Rebels with Causes"	Tom Skerritt	David E. Kelley	November 11, 1994	2K07
Wambaugh accompanies Jill Brock to Chicago where he receives a diagnosis of multiple sclerosis at Chicago Hope Hospital in this crossover episode. Jill clashes with Dr. Jeffrey Geiger (Mandy Patinkin) who, she feels, looks down on her as a small-town doctor. She later complains about him to Dr. Phillip Watters (Hector Elizondo). Meanwhile, Kenny and Kim decide to date each other.
53	8	"May It Please the Court"	Lou Antonio	David E. Kelley	November 18, 1994	2K08
Wambaugh realizes the dream of a lifetime when he presents oral arguments before the Supreme Court. Prior to the hearing, he meets with Alan Dershowitz (playing himself) for advice. Meanwhile, Carter wants to enforce a contract with Stacey (Barbara Alyn Woods) to be a surrogate and prevent her from terminating her pregnancy.
54	9	"For Whom the Wind Blows"	Michael Schultz	David E. Kelley	December 2, 1994	2K09
While Brian Latham continues to proclaim his innocence, Kenny and Max review the evidence of the case and begin to suspect that John Engrams (Tom Everett) was actually the murderer and his wife (Maggie Baird) helped cover it up. Jimmy turns 51 and suffers a midlife crisis.
55	10	"Away in the Manger"	Bill D'Elia	David E. Kelley	December 16, 1994	2K10
Carter Pike suspects that a man (James Handy) is conducting bizarre genetic experiments on cows at a remote farm. (This episode was originally planned as a crossover with The X-Files.)
56	11	"Freezer Burn"	Joe Napolitano	S : Nick Harding; S/T : David E. Kelley	January 6, 1995	2K11
A masseur known for giving erotic massages to female residents of the town is found dead in his freezer. Jimmy Brock is upset when he learns that his wife, Jill, was one of the masseur's clients.
57	12	"Frog Man Returns"	Oz Scott	David E. Kelley	January 13, 1995	2K12
The Frog Man's son tires of his father and goes to court for emancipation. Meanwhile, Zach is injured in a terrible accident and Jill overreacts, striking Matthew for accidentally hurting Zach.
58	13	"Mr. Seed Goes to Town"	Dennis Dugan	Ann Donahue & Geoffrey Neigher & David E. Kelley	January 20, 1995	2K13
Jimmy's ex-wife Lydia visits unexpectedly and brings with her an unusual request: she wants to have another baby and Jimmy to father it.
59	14	"Close Encounters"	Bethany Rooney	S : David Mills; S/T : David E. Kelley	February 3, 1995	2K14
Carter pronounces a woman dead after she collapses while singing, but she later "wakes up" in the morgue and sees Carter as her soulmate. Meanwhile, Kenny and Max take their relationship to the next level.
60	15	"When in Rome"	Lorraine Senna Ferrara	Richard Kramer & Michael Nanking & Nick Harding	February 24, 1995	2K15
When a child molester moves to Rome after spending sixteen years in prison, it causes big problems for the local residents, especially with Jill and Jimmy, who are struggling to reconcile parental concerns with their professional duties.
61	16	"Heroes and Villains"	Richard Masur	David E. Kelley	March 3, 1995	2K16
The hearing-impaired Dancing Bandit is arrested when she visits Zach on his birthday. Federal authorities want her trial to be set in Rome, where the jury reaches a surprising verdict.
62	17	"Changing of the Guard"	Arvin Brown	David E. Kelley	March 10, 1995	2K17
Jimmy goes outside of his department to get the help he needs to find Ed Lawson, who is wanted for murder. Meanwhile, the town launches its own search to find a new mayor, and Kenny and Max are caught kissing on the job.
63	18	"Without Mercy"	James Frawley	David E. Kelley	March 31, 1995	2K18
Jimmy consults Jill when a terminal cancer patient dies of a morphine overdose.
64	19	"Final Judgement"	Michael Pressman	David E. Kelley	April 7, 1995	2K19
When Jill is found guilty of physician-assisted suicide, Wambaugh insists that Judge Bone put the issue of euthanasia on trial. Meanwhile, Kenny and Carter discover that Zack has been killing swans in a nearby pond.
65	20	"Saint Zach"	Michael Nankin	T : David E. Kelley; S/T : Nick Harding	April 28, 1995	2K20
When Zach develops stigmata-like sores on his hands, his friends believe he has healing powers, and a classmate asks him to cure his brother of leukemia.
66	21	"Upbringings"	Nancy Malone	T : David E. Kelley; S/T : Lee Blessing & Jeanne Blake	May 5, 1995	2K21
Jimmy's father, Walter Brock (James Coburn), pays an unexpected visit and asks Jimmy to take over his law firm. This offer provokes long-standing father-son animosities, with Jimmy finally admitting that he dropped out of law school because he believed he would never measure up to his father's expectations of him.
67	22	"The Song of Rome"	Michael Pressman	David E. Kelley	May 12, 1995	2K22
After Father Gary Barrett is shot and killed during a robbery at the church, Mayor Bey proposes holding a spring musical pageant to help pull the community out of its somber mood.

=== Season 4 (1995–96) ===
When first shown on network television, the last 7 episodes were aired out of the order. The list below presents the episodes in their correct chronological order.

No. overall	No. in season	Title	Directed by	Written by	Original release date	Prod. code
68	1	"A Change of Season"	Michael Pressman	Jeff Melvoin	September 22, 1995	3K01
Kimberly surprises her parents with her plans to attend medical school out of state. Carter Pike's house catches fire after he had taken some sedatives, leaving Jill Brock to suspect a suicide attempt.
69	2	"Reap the Whirlwind"	James Frawley	Nick Harding	September 29, 1995	3K02
The Wambaughs have an argument on their 40th anniversary as a tornado threatens the town. Jimmy and Jill worry about Kimberly who is away at college. Meanwhile, Carter meets an interesting new woman while buying quilting supplies.
70	3	"Pal Joey"	Mel Damski	Nicole Yorkin & Dawn Prestwich	October 6, 1995	3K04
A former talk show host, Dr. Joanna "Joey" Diamond (Amy Aquino) joins Jill's medical practice. Kenny begins using a dating service.
71	4	"Bloodbrothers"	Tom Skerritt	John Wirth	October 13, 1995	3K03
District Attorney John Littleton's convict brother escapes from prison and makes his way to Rome.
72	5	"Dog Eat Dog"	Lou Antonio	Lawrence Myers	October 20, 1995	3K05
Maxine is in trouble after she shoots a man wearing a bratwurst costume. Meanwhile, Jill assumes Kimberly is pregnant when she learns her daughter saw Dr. Joey and concealed the office visit from Jill.
73	6	"Heart of Saturday Night"	Jeremy Kagan	Ellen Herman	October 27, 1995	3K06
It is Saturday night in Rome, and the townspeople are looking at various ways to spend the evening. Matthew cruises the town with his friends. Jimmy and Jill make an attempt at romance. Judge Bone and Wambaugh play poker, but one of the men in their group drops dead. Note- In 1997 TV Guide ranked this episode number 96 on its '100 Greatest Episodes of All Time' list.
74	7	"Down the Tubes"	Michael Schultz	Dawn Prestwich & Nicole Yorkin	November 3, 1995	3K07
Jill considers tubal ligation. Brock must dance the polka with the Mayor for charity. Haunted by the death of his brother, Littleton returns to Chicago.
75	8	"This Little Piggy"	Sandy Smolan	Nick Harding	December 8, 1995	3K10
Kimberly is arrested for protesting pig-wrestling at the town fair.
76	9	"Witness for the Prosecution"	Dennie Gordon	David E. Kelley	December 15, 1995	3K09
During a celebration welcoming the Pope to town, someone opens fire, and a man is killed. The victim's gay lover says the man committed suicide, but the Pope says he saw the whole thing and that it was murder. The Pope, therefore, becomes the chief witness in a murder case in Rome, Wisconsin.
77	10	"Dem Bones"	Lou Antonio	Lawrence Myers	January 5, 1996	3K12
The skeleton of a Nazi sympathizer is found and suspicion falls on Jacob Levine, the son of a Jewish butcher who was persecuted by the dead man. Wambaugh rises to Levine's defense only to find himself facing an unexpected prosecuting attorney — his son David, from whom he has been estranged for many years.
78	11	"Bloodlines"	Joe Napolitano	John Wirth	January 12, 1996	3K11
Matthew is deeply depressed after a friend commits suicide and Jimmy takes him on a trip in order to help him overcome his grief.
79	12	"Snow Exit"	Jonathan Pontell	Nicole Yorkin & Dawn Prestwich	January 19, 1996	3K13
A blizzard hits town, stranding Jill and Kimberly in a bar where Lydia is making her singing debut. Likewise, Jimmy is snowed in at the sheriff's office and is the only person available to deliver the Mayor's baby when she goes into labor.
80	13	"My Romance"	Arvin Brown	Ellen Herman	January 26, 1996	3K08
After being struck by a falling power line, Carter sees his deceased grandfather Bob while he is clinically dead for three minutes. This experience causes him to reevaluate his relationship with God and with his girlfriend Sue. Judge Bone meets an old flame of 50 years ago while Zack gets a crush on a young cello prodigy who is visiting for a musical competition. Unfortunately, the girl only has eyes for Matthew.
81	14	"The Z Files"	Arvin Brown	Rosanne Welch & Christine Petit	February 9, 1996	3K14
Zack inserts his teacher's face in a pornographic video and his friend uploads it to the Internet. Maxine meets an online friend in person.
82	15	"Bottled"	David Jones (III)	David E. Kelley	February 16, 1996	3K15
Jill's emotions take control as the family celebrates Zack's 13th birthday.
83	16	"Winner Takes All"	Scott Paulin	Nick Harding	June 5, 1996	3K16
Jill fills in as the school's interim basketball coach when the regular coach collapses during a game. Under pressure from the parents, she becomes obsessed with winning, leading Zack and his teammates to obtain an injunction to remove her. Matthew develops a gambling addiction.
84	17	"Dante's Inferno"	Daniel Attias	Dawn Prestwich & Nicole Yorkin	April 22, 1996	3K17
Maxine Stuart meets with opposition when she fills in as mayor and enacts some unpopular policies and changes. Shock jock Chuck Dante adds fuel to the fire on his radio show. The situation becomes serious when one of Dante's followers shoots Maxine.
85	18	"Forget Selma"	Michael Lange	Ellen Herman	June 12, 1996	3K18
When Wambaugh learns that Miriam has a new man in her life, he suspects that the man must have an ulterior motive.
86	19	"To Forgive is Divine"	Tom Skerritt	Ursula Wendel	June 19, 1996	3K19
When an Amish girl is raped, she refuses to testify against her rapist due to her religious beliefs. The rapist goes free and rapes another girl whose outraged family sues the Amish community, blaming them for the rape.
87	20	"Liver Let Die"	Dennis Smith	Lawrence Myers	June 26, 1996	3K21
Jimmy learns he might have a cancerous growth on his liver. At the same time, he investigates the murder of a homeless man found behind Reverend Novotny's church. The murder suspect grabs Jimmy's gun and holds him hostage at the sheriff's office, but Jimmy and Kenny convince the man to give up the weapon. Later that day, Jimmy learns that the growth on his liver is benign.
88	21	"Bye-Bye, Bey-Bey"	David Jones (III)	John Wirth	April 24, 1996	3K20
It is the christening of Mayor Bey's baby, Michael, but the Rome residents are flabbergasted when Laurie announces that she had the baby for her brother Jerry and his lover Gordy, who plan to raise the baby in the town. The Beys' estranged mother Christine, who turned her back on her children because she was deaf and he was gay, turns up and announces she is taking them all to court to get custody of her grandson. Tension brews in Rome as the people take sides on the issue and a campaign begins to have Laurie removed as Mayor, resulting in Jerry and Gordy being attacked at the supermarket by a vicious homophobic gang. Despite attempts by the prosecution to discredit the men and prove their lifestyle is unsuitable to raise a child in, Judge Bone ultimately rules in their favor and allows them to keep baby Michael, saying he does not feel they pose a threat to the boy. The court case over, Mrs. Bey leaves Rome again under a cloud, and Laurie is emotional as she leaves the baby in the care of his two dads.
89	22	"Three Weddings and a Meltdown"	Mel Damski	Nick Harding & Nicole Yorkin & Dawn Prestwich	April 24, 1996	3K22
In the final episode, Carter inadvertently proposes to Sue after she gets her wires crossed. Nevertheless, he is a man of his word and they announce their engagement to the people of Rome. Their sudden decision to wed prompts Kenny and Max to do the same, although they later begin to experience cold feet. Digging in her friend Selma's backyard, Myriam Wambaugh discovers human remains and Selma goes on trial for murder. Persuaded to defend her by his ex-wife, Wambaugh manages to get her off and passion erupts again for Doug and Myriam, who decide to get remarried in a triple ceremony with Carter & Sue and Kenny & Max. Meanwhile, the Brocks' marriage is in serious trouble, with Jill feeling they have come to the end of the line. She moves in with Joey to do some thinking and Jimmy is left to do the same. At the wedding, the three happy couples tie the knot and the wedding fever gets to Jimmy and Jill, who make up and get back together. As the cast gather for a group photo in their wedding finery, the series ends.
