= December Bride (Roseanne) =

- Roseanne episode
- Episode no.: Season 8 Episode 11
- Directed by: Gail Mancuso
- Written by: William Lucas Walker
- Production code: 911
- Original air date: December 12, 1995

Guest appearances
- Fred Willard as Scott; June Lockhart as Leon's mother; Norm Crosby as Rev. Crosley; Mariel Hemingway as Sharon; Milton Berle as transvestite

Episode chronology
← Previous "Direct to Video"	Next → "The Thrilla Near the Vanilla Extract"

"December Bride" is the eleventh episode of the eighth season of the situation comedy television series Roseanne. The episode was written by William Lucas Walker and directed by Gail Mancuso, and originally aired on ABC on December 12, 1995. The episode revolves around the wedding of recurring character Leon Carp (Martin Mull). Roseanne (Roseanne Barr) volunteers to plan his wedding to his boyfriend, but goes against his wishes to create her own vision of a gay wedding.

"December Bride" was the first time an American television series had depicted the same-sex wedding of a recurring character. Along with the Friends episode "The One with the Lesbian Wedding" that aired a month later, it attracted controversy for portraying a same-sex wedding and network censorship. Nonetheless, it received positive reviews from critics.

== Plot ==
After an angry customer stiffs Roseanne by leaving a check and no tip, she is amused when customer Scott (Fred Willard) calls his wife to prank her. The two enjoy some comradery until Leon (Martin Mull) arrives, revealing Scott is Leon's ex-boyfriend whom he dumped at the altar five years earlier. The two plan on remarrying, but have to go out of town for pre-wedding counseling in Minneapolis. Much to Leon's dismay, Roseanne volunteers to plan the wedding for free.

Roseanne ropes Jackie into helping her plan the wedding. Despite Leon's instructions to plan a simple and modest ceremony, Roseanne plans a campy extravagant wedding with drag queens, male strippers, enormous pink triangles. Leon arrives at the venue and is furious with Roseanne's design, finding it to be filled with offensive stereotypes. He attempts to call it off, but Roseanne locks him in the bathroom to avoid him leaving.

While greeting the wedding guests – including Leon's mother (June Lockhart) – Dan convinces Roseanne to tone down the wedding. While going to calm Leon down, he reveals that his main reason is his anxiety over marrying Scott. He tries to make excuses for leaving, including claiming he isn't gay due to being insensitive, a Republican, and not liking shopping or Barbra Streisand. Roseanne counters by asking, "But do you like having sex with men? GAY!" In a last desperate effort, he kisses Roseanne. He confirms that he is gay and goes forward with the wedding.

With Roseanne's initial plans toned down, Leon and Scott exchange their vows. When Dan is distressed over the grooms kissing (off-screen), Roseanne chides him for making fuss over two men kissing. She proclaims "it just happens to be two people of the same sex kissing, and there's nothing wrong with that" just as Sharon (Mariel Hemingway) — with whom Roseanne previously shared a same-sex kiss with — taps her on the shoulder and greets her, startling Roseanne.

== Background ==
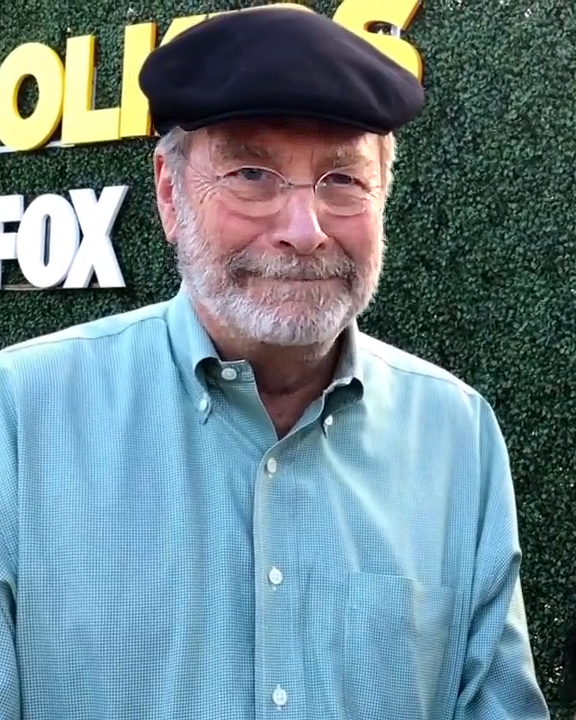
The episode revolved around the wedding of recurring character Leon Carp, portrayed by Martin Mull (pictured in 2018).

The character of Leon Carp was introduced in the third season episode "Valentine's Day" as Roseanne's stingy boss at the Rodbell's Lunchonette. The character was confirmed to be gay in the third season episode "Dances with Darlene" when his boyfriend came to pick him up after his shift. Roseanne Barr was inspired by two of her siblings being gay to push for the inclusion of gay characters and issues into the show, saying "My show seeks to portray various slices of life, and homosexuals are a reality". Both Leon and the character of Nancy, played by out actress Sandra Bernhard, were two of the few gay characters on television at the time with a recurring or main capacity. With the inclusion of Leon and Nancy as recurring characters, Roseanne won the GLAAD Media Award for Outstanding Comedy Series three times in 1992, 1993, and 1995.

"December Bride" also features cameos by Christopher Morley, Alexis Arquette, and David Michaels. Milton Berle famously appeared in drag in the final scene of the episode to catch the bridal bouquet. However, the episode ironically did not feature an appearance from main cast member Sara Gilbert, who would come out as a lesbian after the ending of Roseanne.

== Controversy ==
ABC moved "December Bride" from its regularly scheduled broadcast time of 8:00 PM EST to 9:30 PM. An ABC spokesperson stated that this was not because of the inclusion of a same-sex wedding but because "the adult humor in this episode was more appropriate for the later time period." The network also did not allow the couple to kiss on-screen. The inclusion of Hemingway serves to both mock the double standard between the acceptability of kisses between same-sex male and female couples, as well as a callback to the controversy surrounding the kiss between Sharon and Roseanne on the "Don't Ask, Don't Tell" episode.

== Proposed spin-off ==
Roseanne Barr and William Lucas Walker proposed spinning off Leon and Scott into their own series, with "December Bride" as a backdoor pilot. In the spinoff, Leon and Scott were to be raising a teenage daughter fathered by Leon years before. Barr suggested Don Knotts and RuPaul could play an inter-racial, inter-generational neighbor couple. Walker and Barr submitted a treatment, but ABC did not accept the series, reportedly because the network believed that a series with a gay couple as the central characters could not be sustained. Mull and Willard ultimately remained on Roseanne in a recurring capacity until its end the following season.

== See also ==
- "The One with the Lesbian Wedding", an episode of Friends that featured a same-sex wedding of a lesbian recurring character
