= Don't Ask, Don't Tell (Roseanne) =

- Roseanne episode
- Sharon kissing Roseanne
- Episode no.: Season 6 Episode 18
- Directed by: Philip Charles MacKenzie
- Written by: James Berg; Stan Zimmerman
- Production code: 718
- Original air date: March 1, 1994

Guest appearance
- Mariel Hemingway as Sharon

Episode chronology
← Previous "Don't Make Room for Daddy"	Next → "Labor Day"

"Don't Ask, Don't Tell" is the eighteenth episode of the sixth season of the American situation comedy series Roseanne. Written by James Berg and Stan Zimmerman and directed by Philip Charles MacKenzie. It follows lead character Roseanne Conner on her visit to a gay bar. "Don't Ask, Don't Tell" originally aired on March 1, 1994 on ABC.

"Don't Ask, Don't Tell" generated enormous controversy before it aired because it included a same-sex kiss between Roseanne and Sharon, played by guest star Mariel Hemingway. ABC initially planned not to air the episode. The network eventually relented and the episode was viewed by an audience of some 30 million people. "Don't Ask, Don't Tell" was an early entry on a list of American television episodes in which a lesbian or possibly lesbian character kisses a straight-identifying character. These lesbian kiss episodes often occurred during times of the year when networks were most concerned about generating ratings, and have come to be viewed by some critics as gimmicks to help secure those ratings.

== Plot ==
To prove that she is cool, Roseanne Conner (Roseanne Barr) goes out dancing at a gay bar called "Lips" with her sister Jackie (Laurie Metcalf) and friend Nancy (Sandra Bernhard) and Nancy's girlfriend Sharon (Mariel Hemingway). Roseanne is having fun until Sharon kisses her, causing Roseanne anxiety. The next day, after discussing the kiss with Jackie and getting into an argument with Nancy, Roseanne realizes that she may not be as cool as she thinks she is.

== Reception and controversy ==
ABC, fearing viewer and sponsor backlash, initially planned not to air the episode. Roseanne executive producer Tom Arnold went public with the network's decision in an interview with Variety. Arnold stated that he was told by network executives that "a woman cannot kiss a woman. It is bad for the kids to see," and that the network stood to lose up to $1 million in advertising revenue. In response, Barr threatened to move her series, then one of the most popular on television, to another network. LGBTQ media watchdogs the Gay and Lesbian Alliance Against Defamation urged ABC to air the kiss uncensored, while the conservative Media Research Center declared the episode an insult to American families. ABC eventually relented and not only aired "Don't Ask, Don't Tell" uncensored, but began specifically promoting it as "the lesbian kiss episode". The network did, however, place a parental advisory warning on the episode. At least one sponsor, Kraft Foods, sent out a memo to network affiliates and local advertising agencies ordering that no ads for its products run during the episode, a move that Out magazine's then-publisher Michael Goff said was motivated by "their fear from dealing with America as it is". Barr spoke about the controversy the week before the episode aired, questioning network standards that deem it "shocking to see a woman kiss another woman but not shocking to see a woman raped, mutilated and shot every two seconds".

Television critic Frank Rich of The New York Times called "Don't Ask, Don't Tell" "a small step forward for the stirring of homosexuals into the American melting pot" and a "sophisticated half-hour [that] turned homophobia on its ear". "Don't Ask, Don't Tell" scored 30 million viewers upon first airing. Approximately 100 telephone calls came in to ABC in response to the episode, with most of them being positive. Writers Stan Zimmerman and Jim Berg were nominated for a Writers Guild of America award for their work on the episode.

Roseanne was one of the first American television series to feature an intimate kiss between two women. Three years earlier, L.A. Law had aired an episode that included a kiss between bisexual-identified character C.J. Lamb (Amanda Donohoe) and straight-identifying Abby Perkins (Michele Greene). The kiss led to complaints to the network and five sponsors pulled their ads from the episode. In reviewing incidents of lesbian kisses on network television programs, The New York Times noted that they tended to happen during "sweeps" periods, when the networks use Nielsen ratings to determine advertising rates. Noting lesbian kisses during sweeps periods on such shows as L.A. Law, Picket Fences, Party of Five and Ally McBeal in addition to the Roseanne episode and noting that they occur about once per year, the Times concludes that kisses between women are:

"Eminently visual; cheap, provided the actors are willing; controversial, year in and year out; and elegantly reversible (sweeps lesbians typically vanish or go straight when the week's over), kisses between women are perfect sweeps stunts. They offer something for everyone, from advocacy groups looking for role models to indignation-seeking conservatives, from goggle-eyed male viewers to progressive female ones, from tyrants who demand psychological complexity to plot buffs."

Michele Greene confirmed in an interview with AfterEllen.com that her kiss with Amanda Donohoe's C.J. was a ratings ploy and that there was never any intention on the part of producers to seriously explore the possibility of a relationship between two women.

During a period in network television history when producers were pushing the broadcast boundaries on sexually explicit content with such shows as NYPD Blue, which also aired on ABC, the controversy over this and other television episodes that made inroads into presenting same-sex sexuality or affection led producers not to present any sexualization of their gay and lesbian characters.

"So viewers got to see Carol and Susan wed on Friends, but they didn't get to see them kiss. And fans of NYPD Blue could hear male hustlers talk about their johns, but the only sex they got to see involved the precinct's straight cops—naked butts and all. Clearly, chastity was the price gay characters paid for admission to prime-time television in the 1990s."

Mariel Hemingway reprised her role as Sharon in the 1995 episode "December Bride", in which long-time character Leon (Martin Mull) marries his boyfriend Scott (Fred Willard). Roseanne's husband Dan (John Goodman) is distressed at seeing two men kiss and Roseanne chastises him for making a fuss about two people of the same sex kissing. Sharon then sits down behind Roseanne and says hi. Her cameo serves as a callback to this episode and the controversy it engendered.

Hemingway had also playfully made light of the controversy outside of Roseanne: on September 30, 1995, during her opening monologue while hosting the season premiere of Saturday Night Live, she took viewers on an introductory backstage tour of the show - which had been recast and re-branded over the summer - in which she kissed all three female cast members and director Beth McCarthy.
