= Candace Gingrich =

American LGBT rights activist

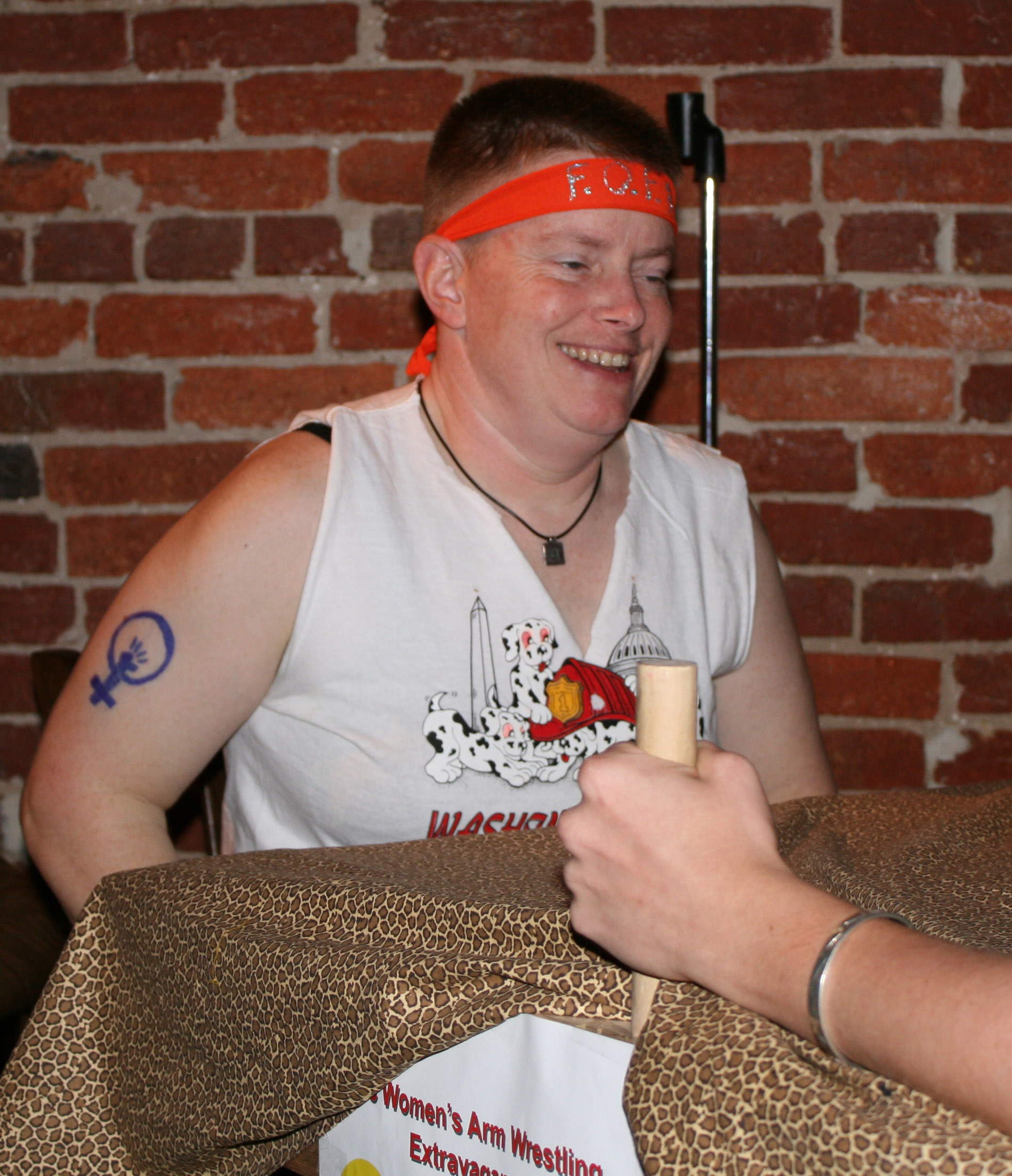
- Candace Gingrich in 2008
- Born: June 2, 1966 (age 60)
- Education: Indiana University of Pennsylvania (BA)
- Spouses: Rebecca Jones (m. 2009; sep. 2013) Kelly Cassidy (m. 2017)
- Relatives: Newt Gingrich (half-brother)

Candace Gingrich (/ˈɡɪŋɡrɪk/; born June 2, 1966) is an American LGBT rights activist at the Human Rights Campaign. Candace is the half-sibling of former Speaker of the House Newt Gingrich.

== Early life ==
Candace Gingrich was born to Robert and Kathleen (Daugherty) Gingrich on June 2, 1966. Gingrich attended high school at Central Dauphin East High School in Harrisburg, Pennsylvania, and graduated from Indiana University of Pennsylvania in 1989.

== Activism ==
Although Gingrich's sexual orientation was publicly reported on as early as 1994, they first gained significant press attention in 1995 as a spokesperson for gay rights. They served as the Human Rights Campaign's National Coming Out Project Spokesperson for 1995 and were named one of Esquire's "Women We Love" and "Women of the Year" for Ms. magazine. From 1995 to 2019 they worked as Senior Manager of the Human Rights Campaign's Youth & Campus Outreach, as well as the Human Rights Campaign's HRC University Internship Program coordinator. Their autobiography, Accidental Activist: A Personal and Political Memoir, was released in 1996. Since 2024, Gingrich has been working as Community Engagement Manager for the Illinois Chapter of the National Association of Social Workers (NASW).

=== Public appearances ===
Gingrich has guest-starred on the television sitcom Friends in January 1996, in which they officiated over a commitment ceremony for two recurring characters in the episode "The One With the Lesbian Wedding". They also appeared on the debut of Al Franken's TV program Lateline in 1998.

Gingrich endorsed President Barack Obama in 2012, despite Newt Gingrich's candidacy for the Republican nomination.

== Personal life ==
Gingrich married playwright Rebecca Jones in 2009. The Gingrich-Joneses lived in Hyattsville, Maryland, where Gingrich played rugby with the Washington Furies. The couple initiated their divorce in 2013. In 2017, Gingrich married Kelly Cassidy, a member of the Illinois House of Representatives.

Gingrich is genderqueer and a lesbian and uses they/them pronouns.

== See also ==
- Gingrich appears in A Union in Wait, a 2001 documentary film about same-sex marriage.
