= Beverly Hills, 90210 season 10 =

Beverly Hills, 90210
- Season 10
- DVD cover
- Starring: Jennie Garth Ian Ziering Brian Austin Green Tori Spelling Vincent Young Vanessa Marcil Lindsay Price Daniel Cosgrove Joe E. Tata Special Guest Star: Luke Perry as Dylan
- No. of episodes: 27

Release
- Original network: Fox
- Original release: September 8, 1999 – May 17, 2000

Season chronology
- ← Previous; Season 9

The tenth and final season of Beverly Hills, 90210, is an American drama television series aired from September 8, 1999 on Fox and concluded on May 17, 2000, after 27 episodes. The season aired on Wednesday nights at 8/7c in the United States averaging 8.33 million viewers a week. It was released to DVD in 2010. Initial plans for an eleventh season were to be developed but due to low ratings and high associated costs with production the show ended at its tenth season.

== Synopsis ==
The final season follows the group of friends in Beverly Hills as they manage their careers, romantic relationships and family responsibilities. Several of the characters have known one another since attending West Beverly Hills High School, while others have joined the group in later years. The season’s storylines centre on marriage, parenthood and career decisions, alongside developments in the characters’ family lives. Their friendships remain a recurring focus as their individual circumstances change and they make decisions about their futures.

== Cast ==
=== Starring ===
- Jennie Garth as Kelly Taylor
- Ian Ziering as Steve Sanders
- Brian Austin Green as David Silver
- Tori Spelling as Donna Martin
- Vincent Young as Noah Hunter
- Vanessa Marcil as Gina Kincaid (episodes 1–17)
- Lindsay Price as Janet Sosna
- Daniel Cosgrove as Matt Durning
- Joe E. Tata as Nat Bussichio (episodes 1–13, 21–27)

=== Special guest star ===
- Luke Perry as Dylan McKay

=== Recurring ===
- Jed Allan as Rush Sanders
- Matthew Laurance as Mel Silver
- Ann Gillespie as Jackie Taylor
- Michael Durrell as John Martin
- Denise Dowse as Vice Principal Yvonne Teasley
- Katherine Cannon as Felice Martin
- Josie Davis as Camille Desmond
- Josh Taylor as Jack McKay
- Sydney Penny as Josie Oliver
- Jesse Hoffman as Shane Oliver
- Heidi Lenhart as Ellen
- Scott Paetty as Charles Yofee
- Josie DiVincenzo as Pia Swanson
- Robb Derringer as Andrew Emery

=== Notable guest stars ===
- Gabrielle Carteris as Andrea Zuckerman
- Tiffani Thiessen as Valerie Malone
- Jason Priestley as Brandon Walsh

== Episodes ==
No. overall	No. in season	Title	Directed by	Written by	Original release date	Prod. code	U.S. viewers (millions)
267	1	"The Phantom Menace"	Charles Correll	John Eisendrath	September 8, 1999	2199259	9.48
Kelly's rapist, Joe Patch, dies of gunshot wounds. Kelly is arrested and held overnight until the shooting is ruled a justifiable homicide. The police consider charging her with possession of an unlicensed firearm, but decline when Matt tells them "justice was done". David asks Dylan to move out. Dylan takes up residence at a hotel, and Gina joins him after Donna boots her out for talking to reporters about Kelly. Wayne annoys Donna with his cavalier attitude, particularly when he fails to show sensitivity toward Kelly. She realizes that they do not have a future together. Noah ignores Donna and fools around with one of his employees. Janet's erratic behavior confuses Steve. She secretly applies for a job with another newspaper, and tells Steve that she isn't sure if their relationship will work out, but also tells him she loves him and leaves him completely confused. Janet confesses to Kelly that she is four months pregnant and she's worried that Steve isn't mature and consistent enough to be the father she needs him to be3.
268	2	"Let's Eat Cake"	Joel J. Feigenbaum	Laurie McCarthy	September 15, 1999	2199260	8.82
Kelly and Donna invite Janet to move into the apartment. Janet tries to tell Steve that she is pregnant, but stops when he mistakenly assumes that she has gotten breast implants. When Janet finally reveals the truth, Steve becomes outraged that she didn't tell him sooner. Janet tells Steve that he can choose how much involvement he wants with the child; he is unsure of what to do. Kelly, Donna and the gang throw a surprise 24th birthday party for David at the After Dark. The deliberately uninvited Gina foils their plans by slashing her own tire and calling David for help. After patching things up with David, Gina takes him to the club and drops him off without spoiling the surprise. A young woman whom Dylan knows from his years at the hotel gets busted for drug possession. He pays for her legal services, and encourages her to get clean and find some direction for her life. He agrees to return to college if she also enrolls. Matt helps Kelly cope with her fear of physical contact. This episode features a special appearance by Christina Aguilera.
269	3	"You Better Work"	Harvey Frost	Gretchen J. Berg & Aaron Harberts	September 22, 1999	2199261	7.95
Steve tells Janet that he wants to raise the baby with her. He later upsets her by expressing uncertainty. Kelly considers a career change. Matt pays Gina to help out with preparations for the boutique's re-opening. She burns an invite and does some damage, and after Matt figures it out and "suggests" she make amends, she does so while everyone chips in to help Donna put together new outfits. Cherise breaks up with Noah for postponing their weekend getaway and spending too much time with Donna. Steve suddenly proposes to Janet during the fashion show. She accepts, but then changes her mind because she fears they would be marrying for the wrong reasons. California University denies Dylan's application because his essay is terrible, but David pulls the revised essay out of the garbage and is impressed enough to successfully lobby the admissions office on Dylan's behalf and get him admitted.
270	4	"A Fine Mess"	Allan Kroeker	John Eisendrath	September 29, 1999	2199262	8.82
Steve buys an engagement ring and practices proposals, often with Noah assuming the role of Janet. Janet sternly tells Steve's friends to stop bothering her but doesn't even sound convinced by her own view that he's too chaotic to be a good father. Steve later breaks down in tears and argues that his spontaneity does not mean that he cannot be responsible, which Janet is visibly moved by. He surprises Janet with a proposal during her ultrasound, and she accepts. Dylan grows tired of living with Gina and suggests that she find her own place. He offers to spring for a hotel suite, but Gina opts to establish her independence. David's becomes a radio shock job but Dylan's angry counter to his act costs David a relationship with a nice woman. Donna recommends a new act for the club, failing to disclose the fact that the singer is Wayne's cousin. Noah is angry, but he and Donna soon get back together yet again. Kelly pouts about Matt's cynical attitude toward marriage and commitment. Joe E. Tata does not appear in this episode.
271	5	"The Loo-Ouch"	Kim Friedman	Tyler Bensinger	October 20, 1999	2199263	8.25
Steve and Janet announce the pregnancy and engagement to her parents, who respond by calling Janet a disgrace. Steve's father tries to convince the couple to put off marriage for a while. Janet collapses and has to be taken to the hospital. She is diagnosed with a panic attack and told to avoid unnecessary stress. Mr. and Mrs. Sosna ask Janet to leave Steve and move back into their house. At the couple's engagement party, Steve lies to Janet's parents about the identity of his mom's lover, Karen. He asks his father to play along, unaware that Rush is apparently the only person in Los Angeles who didn't know that Samantha is gay. Steve and Janet stand up to their families. Although they would appreciate some support, they will not tolerate any further efforts to break them up. Matt and Noah each offer to move out so that Steve can move Janet and the baby into the house. Matt asks Kelly to get an apartment with him, but she nixes this idea. Donna decides that she and Noah will live together. Gina and Noah secretly start an after-hours strip club at the Peach Pit After Dark. Dylan helps a hotel maid and her prankster sons. David asks Robyn for a chance to prove that he is not the obnoxious jerk he portrays on the radio.
272	6	"80's Night"	Chip Chalmers	John Eisendrath	October 27, 1999	2199264	7.81
Joe Patch's parents visit Kelly and ask for her forgiveness. Matt tries to save a convicted rapist and murderer from the death penalty. Kelly is initially supportive, but changes her mind after hearing a description of the man's crimes. A meeting with the client's brother prompts Kelly to realize the anguish experienced by the families of criminals; she forgives Mr. and Mrs. Patch. She strongly objects when Matt appeals the judge's ruling against his client, and decides to stop seeing him for the time being. Donna wanders into the After Dark late at night and discovers the strip club. Gina recognizes David's father as one of the customers. She sneaks him out the back door when the police raid the club. Noah and Donna are among those arrested, as the cops mistake Donna for a prostitute. Dylan realizes that Gina was involved. She promises to stop lying to him, then immediately blackmails Mel. Dylan and Donna question David's on-air antics when he costs a listener his girlfriend. David eventually reunites the couple and ditches the rage DJ shtick in favor of being his affable true self on the air. Janet's college friends ask her to play bass in their band, which is performing at the After Dark's Halloween party. Although Steve stays home and organizes a haunted house for neighborhood kids, he eventually shows up at the club to support Janet.
273	7	"Laying Pipe"	Luke Perry	Matt Dearborn	November 3, 1999	2199265	8.61
Steve and Janet ask Kelly and Dylan to be their baby's godparents. The foursome heads to Ojai for the weekend to meet with the minister. The minister suspects that Dylan is afraid to commit to a woman because of guilt over Toni's death. Dylan and Kelly plan to watch the sunset together. They learn from the news that Matt saved his client, so Kelly decides to go home and congratulate him. Gina catches Dylan and Kelly hugging and accuses them of fooling around. Dylan goes to Kelly's apartment to share his feelings, but sees her with Matt. Steve backs out of plans to sell the Corvette to help pay for a minivan. An angry Janet lets David sell the car to a woman who seems interested in him. Janet has a change of heart, but David's friend destroys the car in a performance art show about chauvinism (for which she also tape recorded David) and Steve glumly says that at least they got the money first. Mel pays off Gina. When she demands more money, he stops payment on the check. Gina calls Jackie to share her revelation. A homeless man dies outside of Donna's store, and Noah calls out Donna's mercurial morality when she almost ends her efforts to find out who he was after hearing negative things about him; the man's family finally confirms he was a good man and Donna tells Noah he was right.
274	8	"Baby, You Can Drive My Car"	Kevin Inch	Story by : Laurie McCarthy; Teleplay by : Gretchen J. Berg & Aaron Harberts	November 10, 1999	2199266	8.21
Janet begins to panic about wedding preparations. Steve suggests that they organize a scavenger hunt for their friends, with clues providing the location of a party. Dylan and his friend Andrew are attacked by gay bashers. Andrew does not want to help put away their attackers because he has yet to come out. His boss finds out that he is gay and puts him on leave. Kelly snipes at Noah during the scavenger hunt, as she blames his strip club for Jackie and Mel's break-up. Gina freaks out when Dylan refuses to pull over and help a stray dog. David helps her find the animal and take it to the vet. The gang arrives at a park to discover that Steve and Janet are holding a surprise wedding ceremony. At the reception, Dylan baffles Kelly by commenting on how beautiful she had looked in her wedding dress. Gina leaves abruptly after Dylan admits that they will probably never get married. She sleeps with David. Kelly confronts Dylan about his remark. He confesses that he flew in for her wedding, only to leave immediately because he couldn't watch her marry someone else, even his best friend Brandon.
275	9	"Family Tree"	Allison Liddi	John Eisendrath	November 17, 1999	2199267	9.29
Steve and Janet endure various calamities on their honeymoon. Just as they are beginning to have a good time, Janet goes into labor. Although the birth is expected to be routine, the doctors are forced to perform an emergency C-section. Janet and the baby experience life-threatening complications. Jackie seeks full custody of Erin, and David and Kelly try to keep their sister's spirits up. Jackie tells Kelly that Gina blackmailed Mel. David refuses to believe this, and Gina denies the allegations. He learns the truth from his father, but decides to give Gina another chance. Dylan helps Andrew get his job back and fights the prejudice at the community center. Kelly complains about Noah's monopolization of the apartment. Donna buys genealogy software as a wedding gift for Steve and Janet. She accesses Gina's birth certificate and discovers that Donna's dad is listed as the father. Joe E. Tata does not appear in this episode.
276	10	"What's in a Name"	Christopher Hibler	Scott Fifer	November 17, 1999	2199268	9.29
Janet pulls through, but the baby suffers from lung problems. Doctors successfully intubate the child, and she is able to breathe on her own. Steve and Janet name their daughter Madeline. Donna confronts her father, who admits alongside Felice they've always known that, and covered it up to avoid embarrassment. Donna is furious at their immortality and storms out during Thanksgiving dinner. Donna nearly reveals the truth to Gina but holds off when Gina emotionally tells her about how she had a great stepfather and never got over his death when she was a little girl. Dylan convinces Kelly and her family to help with the charity Thanksgiving dinner he has organized. Matt accuses him of making a move on Kelly, so Dylan diminishes himself in her eyes by bailing out of his own event. Kelly has had enough of Jackie bashing Mel to Erin, and gets her to knock it off by pointing out that Jackie did the same thing with her absentee father Bill and it made the bad situation much worse.
277	11	"Sibling Revelry"	Graeme Lynch	John Eisendrath	December 15, 1999	2199269	8.08
Gina considers leaving Los Angeles. Donna tells Gina the truth about her parentage and Gina tells Donna to get out of her sight. Gina confides in both David and Dylan and inadvertently leads to Dylan getting lightly injured in a clash with David; in turn, David tells Gina flat-out that she isn't good for him and their romantic relationship is over. Donna assures a weary Gina that her relationship with her stepfather was not a lie. Gina visits her childhood home, which at least stirs up happy memories. Matt gets jealous when Dylan buys a $16,000 painting for Kelly. Kelly confronts Dylan and demands that he make a lifetime commitment or leave her alone. He responds with a frightened grunt, so she stays with Matt. She claims that her offer was just a test, but admits to Donna that she doesn't know how she would have reacted if Dylan had accepted. Donna is horrified when Noah puts off going to a Harvard alumni event and admits to her that he never went to Harvard at all after he drove while drunk and had an accident where a young woman was killed, with his rich family paying off officials to keep him out of prison. Steve becomes overly protective of Madeline after bringing her home from the hospital and Janet tries to get him to loosen up.
278	12	"Nine Yolks Whipped Lightly"	Joel J. Feigenbaum	Laurie McCarthy	December 22, 1999	2199270	7.44
The Martins ask Gina to join them for Christmas. However, they refuse to allow her at their Christmas Eve party because they don't want to explain the situation to friends. Donna initially backs her parents, but skips the party to show Gina her support. Donna continually questions Noah about the car accident that killed his girlfriend. Noah finally breaks up with her, as he cannot bear to relive the tragedy. Felice is clueless as usual when she assumes Gina wants money and offers her a blank check, so Gina tells her to go to hell, but Dr. Martin later comes to Gina and apologizes for what was done to her. Steve and Janet run into her parents at a tree lot. Janet invites them to dinner, where they behave coldly toward Steve and make a hasty exit. Steve tells the Sosnas they're invited over for Christmas but "just know it's your last chance" to embrace the entire family. They show up at the house on Christmas night and give Steve and Janet their blessing. Dylan proves to be a bad influence on the children at the community center after he punches an angry neighbor. Matt asks Kelly to marry him. Dylan also expresses a desire to commit to her. Kelly doesn't choose herself this time; she accepts Matt's proposal. Joe E. Tata does not appear in this episode.
279	13	"Tainted Love"	Robert Weaver	Jim Halterman	January 12, 2000	2199271	7.06
Matt gets into hot water after a client decides to settle; he had already spent the man's retainer on Kelly's engagement ring. Gina tries to help by asking Dylan for $15,000, without telling him who would receive it. Matt turns down the money and has to pawn Kelly's ring. He is suspended from practicing law for 30 days, leaving his practice on the verge of bankruptcy. Dylan acts very aloof around Kelly, and loses interest in his god parenting duties because he doesn't want to spend time with her. A bitter Gina denounces the idea of god parenting, because Dr. Martin had served as her godfather as a means of easing his guilt. She changes her mind and tells Dylan that he could be a positive influence on Madeline. He shows up at Madeline's baptism at the last minute and impresses everyone with his speech about being a positive and responsible presence. Donna has a disastrous date with the guy who runs the coffee stand next to her store. Noah spends all his time partying with a bunch of weird people. As he moves out, he and Donna act as though they long to get back together for the umpteenth time. Joe E. Tata is dropped from the credits after this episode. From now on, he is only included in the opening when he appears in the episode.
280	14	"I'm Using You 'Cause I Like You"	Ian Ziering	Gretchen J. Berg & Aaron Harberts	January 19, 2000	2199272	7.27
Matt violates his suspension by negotiating a settlement for a worker injured on the job, who would lose his right to file a complaint in two days. Matt sets up David on a date with an attorney friend who is on the ethics committee. David blabs about the case, and the woman warns Matt to cease his involvement or be reported to the bar association. Matt just laughs it off and continues his work, so Chrissy reports him. Matt's suspension is doubled, and David stops seeing Chrissy because he considers her a traitor. Kelly announces that she is quitting the store. Donna gets a date with a handsome man who turns out to be married. She and David decide to hang out together in their own "losers' club." Gina receives a spokesmodel offer after she and Dylan are pictured at a hot club in the society pages. Noah and his entourage leech off of Dylan and his money. Dylan objects when they do drugs in his limousine. Dylan and Gina get pulled over for speeding in the limo. The police find cocaine in the back seat and arrest them. Despite her innocence, Gina loses a chance at the job. Dylan clears them by identifying Noah's friend (and Dylan's one-night stand) Josie as a drug dealer. Josie flushes her supply, but her junkie brother threatens Dylan. Steve and Janet hire a perky young nanny. Noah takes her out and discovers that she is a nymphomaniac. Steve realizes that he slept with her during college. This episode features a special appearance by Nu Flavor. Despite earlier reports that Beverly Hills, 90210 would air re-runs over the summer and could possibly return for an 11th season, Fox announced the show's cancellation in January 23, 2000.
281	15	"Fertile Ground"	Victor Lobl	John Eisendrath	January 26, 2000	2199273	7.54
Matt's brother and sister-in-law come to town and reveal that they cannot conceive a child on their own. They ask Matt to be their surrogate father. Kelly objects and orders Matt to turn them down, then becomes angry upon learning that he told his brother that he had to bow to her wishes. She later realizes that not everything is about her and gives Matt her blessing. Gina, with Dylan's help, gets a shot at another television job. The man will not hire her unless she helps his teenage son lose weight before the school dance. Gina loses the job (as usual)after she encourages the boy to stand up to his overbearing father. She convinces the man to treat his son with respect by detailing the way that her pushy mother shaped her life. Gina escorts Michael to the dance, where Dylan surprises her by showing up to give her the prom she never had. Donna dates the clothing buyer for a chain of stores. He buys a bunch of her designs, but Donna nixes a relationship because they have nothing in common. She becomes jealous when David gets involved with Camille Desmond, the editor of a fashion magazine. Steve confesses his past fling with Darby to Janet, who fires the woman. Steve suffers a bruised ego because Darby doesn't remember the encounter. Josie fears for her life because she had to flush $90,000 worth of merchandise; she insists that the other dealer will kill her. Josie asks Noah to lobby Dylan on her behalf. He refuses to help. Josie's brother Shane and another man kidnap Noah at gunpoint, as they assume that someone would actually pay to get him back.
282	16	"The Final Proof"	Brian Austin Green	Matt Dearborn & Tyler Bensinger	February 9, 2000	2199274	7.25
Shane demands a one-million-dollar ransom from Dylan. Noah points out that it may have been smarter to kidnap someone whom Dylan actually likes. Dylan agrees to pay the ransom; but Shane kidnaps him with help from Josie, who had claimed to be unaware of her brother's whereabouts. Shane plans to kill Dylan and Noah because it couldn't get him into any more trouble than he already is. They escape while the kidnappers are filling up their van, and scuffle with Shane and his friend. Josie hands over her gun to Dylan because she doesn't want anyone to be murdered. She drops a lit cigarette, which ignites the overflowing gasoline. Although Dylan tells him to forget it, Noah retrieves the ransom money before the van explodes. The kidnappers get arrested. Dr. Martin invites Gina to dinner while Felice is out of town. Gina tries to bond with him, but is angry because he had not called her since Christmas. Dr. Martin visits Gina's hotel room and expresses a willingness to work things out. They embrace, and she agrees to call him "Dad." Gina trains her father in an effort to get him into shape. As Donna arrives for the trio's dinner engagement, Gina finds that Dr. Martin has collapsed. Donna tries desperately to revive him. Kelly becomes ill just before she is to appear on a couples game show with Matt, so Donna takes her place. Matt comes to believe that Kelly shares too many details of their private life. David fears that Camille is going back to her rich ex-boyfriend. This episode features a special appearance by Ryan Seacrest.
283	17	"Doc Martin"	Kevin Inch	John Eisendrath & Laurie McCarthy	February 16, 2000	2199275	8.22
Dr. Martin dies of a stroke. Kelly suggests that Gina is to blame for his death, as does the grief-stricken Felice. David also seems to support this theory and makes sure to be as unsupportive of Gina as possible. Gina is upset when the obituary states that Dr. Martin has only one child; Felice calls her a mistake. Donna feels that Dr. Martin would still be alive if Gina hadn't discovered he was her father, even though Donna was the one who shared this information. Dylan, who was the only person to defend Gina during this ordeal grows tired of Kelly's whining and moralizing. He and Gina decide to leave town. Gina is not allowed to sit with immediate family at the funeral. However, she goes to the front of the church and finishes the eulogy when Donna is unable to continue. Felice embraces her and accepts her as part of the family. Dylan decides that he shouldn't leave Los Angeles because he has unfinished business with Kelly, something that Gina is neither surprised or that upset by. Gina says goodbye to Donna and embarks on a cross-country road trip. David comforts Donna throughout her ordeal. Kelly takes a public relations job to ease the financial burden created by Matt's suspension. She is shocked to learn that she must campaign against gay students' right to form high school clubs. In the aftermath of the kidnapping, Noah becomes depressed and drinks a lot. This is Vanessa Marcil's final episode. Beth Hart makes a special appearance.
284	18	"Eddie Waitkus"	Chip Chalmers	John Eisendrath	March 1, 2000	2199276	6.70
During news coverage of an emergency landing at a Los Angeles airport, Dylan and Steve observe that one of the passengers looks exactly like Dylan's late father. Dylan, with some prompting from conspiracy theorist Steve, becomes convinced that his father is still alive. He grows even more suspicious after discovering that the storage locker with Jack's belongings has been ransacked. He goes to see Christine Pettit at the FBI and demands some answers. She agrees to investigate, but insists that the whole thing is just a coincidence. Although she urges Dylan to let it go, Kelly obtains a passenger list from the airline. Dylan notices that one of the passengers is named Eddie Waitkus. He explains to Steve that Waitkus was the real-life inspiration for "The Natural," a story that was a favorite of baseball fanatics Dylan and Jack. Waitkus disappeared, only to suddenly resurface several years later. Dylan emphatically declares that Jack is alive. Donna gives up a chance at dating a nice guy in order to play nursemaid to the boozing Noah. Donna claims that she is only helping Noah because he doesn't have any friends, while Janet and David insist that he is trying to win her back. Noah breaks into the beach apartment in the middle of the night. Matt doesn't realize that it is Noah; he clobbers him with a baseball bat, leaving him unconscious. Kelly reluctantly writes a speech in favor of the ballot initiative banning gay clubs. She has a crisis of conscience and quits the p.r. firm. Camille becomes a partner in Now Wear This. She and David have a misunderstanding about sex.
285	19	"I Will Be Your Father Figure"	Tori Spelling	Story by : Scott Fifer; Teleplay by : Gretchen J. Berg & Aaron Harberts	March 8, 2000	2199277	7.10
Kelly and Matt help Dylan search for his father. They learn that Eddie Waitkus lives in Tolleson, Arizona; and Kelly obtains his address. Dylan sees that Jack has a happy life with a wife and young son, and decides not to approach him. Jack shows up at Dylan's hotel room. Donna insists on looking after Noah as he recovers from his injuries. Noah tries to rekindle their relationship, but Donna has moved on. Camille becomes jealous of the closeness between David and Donna. Although David and Donna try to establish some boundaries, neither seems very happy about it. Steve's brother Ryan comes to visit for spring break. He is a pre-med major at Amherst. Ryan goes drinking at clubs with Steve every night, lies around like a pig all day, and mouths off to Janet. Janet opines that Ryan is trying to live up to Steve's reputation. Ryan reveals that he wound up on academic probation because of his constant partying, and dropped out of school. Kelly starts her own public relations firm.
286	20	"Ever Heard the One About the Exploding Father?"	Anson Williams	John Eisendrath & Laurie McCarthy	March 15, 2000	2199278	7.14
Dylan orders his father to leave. He is angry with Kelly for going against his wishes by contacting Jack. Dylan storms out of another meeting with his father after learning that Jack told his wife everything else about his past without mentioning Dylan's existence. Jack decides to leave the Witness Protection program and move his family to Los Angeles. They believe that his testimony is long forgotten and that private security can protect them. Christine warns Dylan that two of Jack's enemies have discovered that he is alive and are planning on revenge. Dylan convinces Jack to stay in the program, and cannot bring himself to leave with him. A New York radio station offers David a job. David turns down the offer because he doesn't want to leave Donna. Kelly suspects that Donna is jealous of Camille. Donna denies this, but later confesses to Kelly that she is still in love with David. Steve becomes concerned when Noah gives Ryan a job at the After Dark. Noah warns Ryan not to follow in his footsteps by throwing away his chance at an education. Ryan elects to travel with Rush in Europe for a while, then enroll at California University. Steve and Janet struggle with the task of getting Maddy to sleep on her own. Matt represents a comedian who was fired for not being funny.
287	21	"Spring Fever"	Allison Liddi-Brown	Annie Brunner	March 22, 2000	2199279	7.49
Dylan and Matt go dirt biking for the weekend. They find that their campground is the site of a rave. Matt unwittingly drinks fruit juice that contains liquid acid. He gets very wild and winds up sleeping with one of the partygoers. Dylan advises him to keep the encounter a secret. A lonely Donna grows more jealous of David's relationship with Camille. She accidentally walks in on them having sex on the floor of the store. She freaks out and starts disinfecting everything in sight. Camille suspects that Donna wants David back. David tries to broach the subject with Donna; they reminisce, but do not disclose their feelings. Noah recognizes a bar customer as a woman from his A.A. group. He stops her from drinking, and they quickly make a connection. She feels threatened by Donna until Noah helps her obtain a full-time job. Kelly recommends Maddy for a sausage commercial. Janet neglects her work and becomes caught up in the idea of being a show biz parent. A change in the campaign causes Steve to replace Maddy as the focal point of the spots. He quickly lets the success go to his head.
288	22	"The Easter Bunny"	Charlie Correll	John Eisendrath	April 5, 2000	2199280	6.47
Kelly grows suspicious of Matt's distant behavior. She seeks answers from Dylan, who denies that anything unusual happened during their dirt biking weekend. Matt admits to drinking spiked punch. After witnessing Kelly's indignant reaction, he decides not to tell her about his one-night stand. Kelly insists that Matt is still hiding something from her. She later apologizes for failing to trust him. Camille tries to convince Donna to sell her clothing online. Although Donna doesn't support the idea, Camille seeks out Dylan as an investor. Even after Donna agrees to the proposal, David fumes at Camille for going behind her back. He also expresses discontent at the amount of time she is spending with Dylan. Donna agrees to a date with the web page designer. Steve and Janet fear that her parents' dog is to blame for the death of their snooty neighbors' pet rabbit. Steve concocts a scheme to keep the couple from discovering the truth. Ellen objects to Noah's efforts to help her establish a normal life. Donna reminds Noah that he cannot single-handedly save Ellen. This episode features a special appearance by Edwin McCain.
289	23	"And Don't Forget to Give Me Back My Black T-Shirt"	Allan Kroeker	Story by : Gretchen J. Berg & Aaron Harberts; Teleplay by : Matt Dearborn & Tyler Bensinger	April 19, 2000	2199281	6.56
Mitch annoys Donna by trying to plan their entire relationship via an electronic organizer. She suggests that they stop seeing each other outside of the business setting. Mitch responds by freezing her web site until she agrees to another date. Donna tells him off and makes it clear that she will not change her mind. Mitch opens the site, which quickly becomes a major success. David objects when Camille is asked to model for the web site. He admits to Donna that he is purposely trying to sabotage his romance with Camille. David finally breaks up with Camille, telling her that they simply weren't meant to be together. Janet nixes Steve's plans to invest in Donna's site because of their limited finances. Steve infuriates her by investing money left to him by his grandfather. Janet didn't know the account existed, and thinks that Steve kept it as a safety net so that he could leave her. Steve explains that he fears he won't be able to properly support his family; he used the account as insurance against his screw-ups. A man that Matt met during his desert weekend approaches him for legal services. Kelly hears him mention Amy, so Matt covers by claiming that Dylan slept with the woman. Noah bails Ellen out of jail after she is found drinking in her car. He convinces her to return to A.A. Ellen reveals that she has a six-year-old daughter, who lives with her grandmother because Ellen can't take care of her.
290	24	"Love Is Blind"	Jennie Garth	John Eisendrath	April 26, 2000	2199282	7.74
Donna is upset by her mother's decision to sell the house. David hangs out with her at the apartment, and they both fall asleep on the couch. Donna pulls away from a kiss because she doesn't want to risk their friendship by becoming romantically involved. Felice and the gang grant Donna's wish for one final Christmas at the house. Steve, Janet and Felice set up an unwitting Donna and David on a date. They finally decide to get back together, and share a passionate kiss. Kelly and Matt set an August wedding date. Dylan infuriates Kelly with his wedding gift, a trip around the world for two. Matt considers a job offer in Seattle, and Kelly agrees to go with him. Although he fails to get the job, Matt suggests that they move anyway. Dylan unsuccessfully pleads with Kelly for another chance at their relationship. A man offers to purchase The Beat for $750,000. Janet would continue to work at the paper, while Steve would stay home with Maddy. They decide to give this arrangement a trial run. Steve initially feels emasculated, but comes to enjoy spending time with his daughter. Janet fears that she is missing out on the major events in Maddy's life. Noah helps convince Ellen's mother to let her spend time with her daughter, Caitlin. Ellen tells Noah that she doesn't have time to date him, as she must concentrate on being a good mother.
291	25	"I'm Happy for You...Really"	Roy Campanella II	Laurie McCarthy	May 10, 2000	2199283	9.25
Camille returns to town after a long vacation with hope of reconciliation with David, unaware of his returning feelings for Donna who finds Camille's presence uncomfortable. Meanwhile, a reported surfing accident in Dylan's area makes Kelly search for him, thinking that he may be dead. When the rumor is false and Dylan turns up alive, Kelly ponders her hidden feelings for him. Janet is offered a better editing job away from the Beverly Beat, which makes Steve wary about the turn of events. Also, Noah meets with Ellen again to try to work out their differences and start anew.
292	26	"The Penultimate"	Michael Lange	John Eisendrath	May 17, 2000	2199284	14.38
David expresses his feelings for Donna by writing her a giant love note in the sand. He is understanding about her reluctance to accept his proposal. He believes that she is having trouble reconciling her dreams of the perfect marriage with reality. A talk with Janet prompts Donna to realize that her expectations have been unreasonable. She tells David that she loves him and wants to spend the rest of her life with him. Dylan graduates from California University. Matt considers moving to New York to help his sister-in-law raise his child (for whom he was the sperm donor). He declares that he will stay in Los Angeles for Kelly. Kelly, unable to fight her feelings for Dylan, calls off the engagement. Matt assumes that Dylan told her about his indiscretion in the desert. Kelly lashes out at Dylan for failing to disclose this information. Janet is distressed to learn that she must compete for the editorship of Nouveau, which Yoffe had led her to believe was already hers. She feels left out as Steve strengthens his bond with Maddy. Ellen asks Noah for a commitment in order to protect Caitlin from potential heartache. He declines because the relationship is moving too quickly for him.
293	27	"Ode to Joy"	Kevin Inch	John Eisendrath	May 17, 2000	2199285	14.38
While preparing for her and David's wedding, Donna asks Nat to give her away at the wedding, since she always saw him as a second father. Steve and Janet start their own newspaper company after selling the Beverly Beat. Andrea and Valerie return for Donna's Bachelorette party and gives the girls and the guys videos of Brandon congratulating the bride and groom since he couldn't be there for the wedding. The wedding goes off without a hitch, and Matt shows up to make peace with Kelly, and tells her she should be with Dylan and he leaves for New York. Noah decides to commit to Ellen and leaves the wedding, and Kelly and Dylan get back together. Then everyone starts dancing and the gang gives each other one final group hug and the series ends. This episode features a special appearances by Tamia and Eric Benét. Tiffani Thiessen and Gabrielle Carteris return as Valerie Malone and Andrea Zuckerman, and Jason Priestley as Brandon appears in a video message.
