= Callback (comedy) =

Form of joke

In comedy, a callback is a joke that refers to one previously told in the set. It is also known as an internal allusion, a literary device that helps give structure to the piece of writing. Callbacks are a subset of inside jokes which refer to something told in the set rather than to anything in general.

== Television ==
In television, the term callback has come to mean a joke or line that refers to a previous episode (or sometimes, in rare cases, movies). Particularly in earlier sitcoms—though even until the early 1990s—callbacks were rare and often frowned upon by networks, because they threaten to alienate a viewer who is new to the series, or who has missed episodes, particularly if the callback is tied to previous episodes (this is especially a threat to a show's syndication value, as shows in which the episodes are self-contained, and thus can be rerun out of order, can fetch a higher sale price than shows that must be run in sequence).

Seinfeld, a show built around stand-up comedy, regularly used callbacks in its scripts; its use of the strategy commonly kept the callbacks confined to events in the same episodes, having the effect of bringing the episode full-circle or creating an ironic twist ending. Another series, 30 Rock, employed callbacks to reference fictitious movies and television programs created within the show. Arrested Development became well known by fans for its regular use of callbacks throughout all of its episodes.

The line between a callback and simple continuity can be ambiguous. Repeatedly calling back to the same joke is a running gag.

== See also ==
- Fictional crossover
- Running gag
