= The One with the Lesbian Wedding =

- Friends episode
- Carol and Susan exchange vows
- Episode no.: Season 2 Episode 11
- Directed by: Thomas Schlamme
- Written by: Doty Abrams
- Production code: 457312
- Original air date: January 18, 1996

Guest appearances
- Jane Sibbett as Carol Willick; Jessica Hecht as Susan Bunch; Candace Gingrich as the minister; Lea DeLaria as the woman; Phil Leeds as Mr. Adleman; Marlo Thomas as Sandra Green (Rachel's mother)

Episode chronology
| ← Previous "The One with Russ" | Next → "The One After the Superbowl" |
- Friends season 2

"The One with the Lesbian Wedding" is the eleventh episode of the second season of the television sitcom Friends written by Doty Abrams, directed by Thomas Schlamme and first aired by NBC on January 18, 1996. The episode revolves around Ross's ex-wife Carol marrying her life partner Susan.

"The One with the Lesbian Wedding" is at least the third time a same-sex wedding ceremony was depicted in a sitcom, following the Roc episode "Can't Help Loving that Man," which aired in 1991, and the Roseanne episode "December Bride," which aired a month before the Friends episode. It attracted mild controversy and censorship. Nonetheless, it received positive reviews from critics.

== Plot ==
Ross' ex-wife Carol (Jane Sibbett) and her lesbian life partner Susan (Jessica Hecht) are getting married; Ross' sister Monica caters the wedding. Carol's parents refuse to attend the wedding, leading Carol to doubt her decision, but Ross – initially hesitant to see his ex-wife remarry – finds himself in the position of being the one to encourage her to go ahead with the ceremony despite her parents' opposition. At the reception, Susan thanks Ross for his part in saving the wedding, and offers to dance with him; he agrees, apparently resolving their strained relationship.

One of Phoebe's massage clients, Rose Adelman, dies on the massage table and her spirit apparently gets stuck inside Phoebe for a while. Rose, via Phoebe, corrects people's behavior and makes weird jokes using references to obscure people or events. Upon talking to Rose's husband (Phil Leeds), who states that Rose wanted to see everything, Phoebe takes Rose sightseeing around New York, but is not able to rid herself of Rose. However, during Carol and Susan's wedding, Rose blurts out that she has now seen everything and promptly bolts out of Phoebe's body. During the reception, Phoebe muses to Chandler about how she misses Rose; one of the wedding guests (Lea DeLaria), comically assuming that Phoebe and Rose were a lesbian couple, suggests that Phoebe find a way to forget about Rose and move on with her life, and offers to buy her a drink, which Phoebe accepts.

Meanwhile, Rachel's mother, Sandra (Marlo Thomas), makes a major life decision after seeing how Rachel has learned to fend for herself: she is considering leaving Rachel's father. Rachel is horrified at the thought of her parents splitting up and angry at her mother, but Sandra admits she wants to do this because Rachel did not marry her Barry, the man she never loved, but she did hers. Rachel, stunned at this revelation, gives her mother her blessing to move on.

Early on in the episode, Joey makes his first appearance on the long-running soap opera Days of Our Lives as Dr. Drake Ramoray. He shares with the group a "smell-the-fart" acting tip he had learned from the actress he did his first scene with.

== Reception ==
As a result of its portrayal of a lesbian couple marrying, the episode attracted some controversy across the United States. Two network affiliates refused to air the episode—KJAC-TV in Port Arthur, Texas and WLIO in Lima, Ohio—citing objectionable content, although the decision drew little press attention, partly due to the small size of the markets in question. Gay and lesbian groups—notably GLAAD—decried the censorship of the episode.

While this episode of Friends was one of the first mainstream portrayals of gay marriage on U.S. television, it was at least the third gay marriage on an American sitcom. Roc had aired an episode with a same-sex ceremony in 1991, and Roseanne had aired an episode just five weeks before the Friends episode called "December Bride" in which the title character coordinated and attended a wedding for her co-worker Leon and his partner Scott. The New York Times claimed, "The biggest news about the wedding on Friends was that it was almost no news at all." However, the fact that Carol and Susan's ceremony was officiated by Candace Gingrich, a gay-rights activist and sibling to conservative Speaker of the House of Representatives Newt Gingrich did draw some media attention, as the casting was perceived as a comment on the Republican Party's anti-gay rights stance and the "Contract with America" platform. A writer with the Associated Press noted in an article that week that the ceremony would not include a kiss by the newlyweds, including the episode as part of an observed trend of portrayals of gay characters while skirting controversy by avoiding or minimizing physical contact.

The episode was the highest-rated television program for the week, with 31.6 million viewers. According to Marta Kauffman, 'NBC expected thousands and thousands of phone calls and hate mail' but actually received only four complaints by telephone.
