= Sugar & Spice (Picket Fences) =

- Picket Fences episode
- Kimberly and Lisa Fenn exchange an intimate kiss. CBS demanded that the kiss be re-shot with reduced lighting before the episode was broadcast.
- Episode no.: Season 1 Episode 21
- Directed by: Alan Myerson
- Written by: David E. Kelley
- Production code: 9K20
- Original air date: April 29, 1993

Guest appearances
- Cristine Rose; Alexondra Lee

Episode chronology
← Previous "Rights of Passage"	Next → "The Lullaby League"

"Sugar & Spice" is an episode of the CBS comedy-drama series Picket Fences. Written by series creator David E. Kelley and directed by Alan Myerson, the episode originally aired on April 29, 1993. The episode caused controversy because it depicted 16-year-old lead character Kimberly Brock engaged in same-sex kissing with her best friend and frankly discussing her sexuality.

"Sugar & Spice" was an early entry on a list of American television episodes in which a lesbian or possibly lesbian character kisses a straight-identifying character. These lesbian kiss episodes often occurred during times of the year when networks were most concerned about generating ratings, and have come to be viewed by some critics as gimmicks to help secure those ratings. The controversy generated by "Sugar & Spice" and other lesbian kiss episodes led to a chilling effect on the non-sensationalized presentation of same-sex intimacy on network television through most of the rest of the 1990s.

== Plot ==
Kimberly Brock (Holly Marie Combs) and her best friend Lisa Fenn (Alexondra Lee) exchange several experimental kisses during a sleepover at Kimberly's house, the first kiss being a chaste peck, with the later kisses becoming more intimate. Kimberly's younger brother Matthew (Justin Shenkarow) eavesdrops on the girls the next day when they discuss the incident and their feelings. He goes to his mother, town doctor Jill Brock (Kathy Baker) and tells her that Kimberly is a "lesbo". A patient overhears, and word of the kissing spreads through the town. Kimberly's father, Sheriff Jimmy Brock (Tom Skerritt) and stepmother Jill react poorly to the idea that their daughter might be a lesbian, debating "nature vs. nurture" and "elective lesbianism" and even renting "hunk films" starring Mel Gibson and Kevin Costner. Kimberly turns to her birth mother, Lydia (Cristine Rose), who had had a lesbian relationship in college. Lydia advises her that her relationship with another woman was during the women's movement and that while she enjoyed her time with the woman, she realized that she was confusing feelings of intimacy with sexuality. Lisa and Kimberly talk further. Lisa acknowledges that she is in love with Kimberly, but Kimberly lets her know that she is unable to return those feelings.

In a secondary plot, male Sheriff's deputy Kenny Lacos (Costas Mandylor) is given a promotion over female deputy Maxine Stuart (Lauren Holly) after she is asked in her interview about such things as whether she was planning to get married and get pregnant in the near future. She sues for sex discrimination, and Kenny's promotion is reversed. She tells Kenny that she would be proud to serve under him, but tells Sheriff Brock that his blatant bigotry has made her less proud to serve under him.

== Production ==
Kimberly and Lisa's first, more chaste, kiss. Note the difference in lighting levels.

Before "Sugar & Spice" aired, CBS, fearing sponsor pullouts and viewer backlash, demanded revisions to the kissing scene. According to Kelley in a Los Angeles Times interview, the network initially suggested fading to black before the second, more intimate kiss, then suggested cutting away before the kiss to a shot of one of Kimberly's brothers eavesdropping. Eventually, the network and Kelley settled on reshooting the kissing scene in darkness. In the episode as aired, a line of dialogue is inserted over a shot of the exterior of the Brock house to explain why the room is suddenly dark.

== Reception ==
Network affiliate KSL-TV in Salt Lake City, which had earlier refused to air an episode dealing with polygamy, also refused to air this episode. In a move described by Stephen Tropiano of PopMatters as "a prime example of network hypocrisy", CBS released the original footage along with the reshot scene to Entertainment Tonight, which generated enormous publicity for the episode. Television critic John Martin described this episode as indicative of the way that Picket Fences deftly blended ethical and social issues with family concerns.

=== The "lesbian kiss episode" ===
Picket Fences was one of the first American television series to feature an intimate kiss between two women. Two years earlier, L. A. Law had aired an episode (also written by Kelley) that included a kiss between bisexual-identified character C. J. Lamb (Amanda Donohoe) and straight-identifying Abby Perkins (Michele Greene). The kiss led to complaints to the network, and five sponsors pulled their ads from the episode. In reviewing incidents of lesbian kisses on network television programs, the New York Times noted that they tended to happen during "sweeps" periods, when the networks use Nielsen ratings to determine advertising rates. Noting lesbian kisses during sweeps periods on such shows as L. A. Law, Roseanne, Party of Five and Ally McBeal in addition to the Picket Fences episode and noting that they were occurring about once per year, the Times concludes that kisses between women are:

"Eminently visual; cheap, provided the actors are willing; controversial, year in and year out; and elegantly reversible (sweeps lesbians typically vanish or go straight when the week's over), kisses between the women are perfect sweeps stunts. They offer something for everyone, from the advocacy groups looking for role models to indignation-seeking conservatives, from goggle-eyed male viewers to progressive female ones, from tyrants who demand psychological complexity to plot buffs."

The Guardian concurred in this assessment, calling the lesbian kiss episode "a clear sign of desperation and a show running out of ideas...Snogging The Friend is the new Jumping The Shark."

Michele Greene confirmed in an interview with AfterEllen.com that her kiss with Amanda Donohoe's C. J. was a ratings ploy and that there was never any intention on the part of producers to seriously explore the possibility of a relationship between two women.

During a period in network television history when producers were pushing the broadcast boundaries on sexually explicit content with such shows as NYPD Blue, the controversy over this and other television episodes that made inroads into presenting same-sex sexuality or affection led producers not to present any sexualization of their gay and lesbian characters. As noted by author Ron Becker,

"So viewers got to see Carol and Susan wed on Friends, but they didn't get to see them kiss. And fans of NYPD Blue could hear male hustlers talk about their johns, but the only sex they got to see involved the precinct's straight cops—naked butts and all. Clearly, chastity was the price gay that characters paid for admission to prime-time television in the 1990s."
