= List of Ellen episodes =

This is a list of episodes of the 1990s sitcom, Ellen/These Friends of Mine, which aired on ABC from March 29, 1994, to July 22, 1998. A total of 109 episodes were produced.

== Series overview ==
Season	Episodes	Originally released	
Season	Episodes	First released	Last released
1	13	March 29, 1994	August 30, 1994
2	24	September 21, 1994	May 17, 1995
3	25	September 12, 1995	May 21, 1996
4	25	September 17, 1996	May 13, 1997
5	22	September 24, 1997	July 22, 1998

- Note: Two episodes that aired in Season 3, "The Tape" and "The Mugging" were filmed at the same time as Season 1. They are included in the Season 1 DVD box set, and are not included in the Season 3 one.

== Episodes ==
=== Season 1 (1994) ===
No. overall	No. in season	Title	Directed by	Written by	Original release date	Prod. code	U.S. viewers (millions)
1	1	"Pilot"	Neal Marlens	David S. Rosenthal & Carol Black & Neal Marlens	March 29, 1994	5286	26.9
2	2	"The Anchor"	Rob Schiller	David S. Rosenthal	March 30, 1994	C305	29.9
3	3	"A Kiss is Still A Kiss"	Andrew D. Weyman	Suzanne Martin	April 6, 1994	C311	29.5
4	4	"The Class Reunion"	Rob Schiller	Mark Wilding	April 13, 1994	C306	27.6
5	5	"The Promotion"	Rob Schiller	David S. Rosenthal	April 20, 1994	C302	25.0
6	6	"The Hand That Robs the Cradle"	Andrew D. Weyman	Mark Driscoll	April 27, 1994	C313	22.8
7	7	"The Go-Between"	Andrew D. Weyman	Mark Wilding	May 4, 1994	C312	23.3
8	8	"The Houseguest"	John Bowab	Warren Bell & David S. Rosenthal	May 24, 1994	C314	23.3
9	9	"The Refrigerator"	Rob Schiller	Richard Day	August 9, 1994	C303	18.2
10	10	"The Soft Touch"	Andrew D. Weyman	Richard Day	August 23, 1994	C310	18.7
11	11	"The Boyfriend Stealer"	Andrew D. Weyman	David S. Rosenthal & Warren Bell	August 30, 1994	C309	19.6
N–A	12	"The Mugging"	Rob Schiller	David S. Rosenthal	May 21, 1996	C304	14.3
N–A	13	"The Tape"	Andy Ackerman	David S. Rosenthal	May 14, 1996	C307	15.3

=== Season 2 (1994–95) ===
No. overall	No. in season	Title	Directed by	Written by	Original release date	Prod. code	U.S. viewers (millions)
12	1	"The Dentist"	Tom Cherones	Mark Driscoll	September 21, 1994	C315	25.8
13	2	"Saint Ellen"	Tom Cherones	Richard Day	September 28, 1994	C316	23.8
14	3	"The Thirty-Minute Man"	Tom Cherones	Suzanne Martin	October 5, 1994	C318	21.7
15	4	"The Note"	Tom Cherones	David S. Rosenthal	October 12, 1994	C319	22.6
16	5	"The Fix-Up"	Tom Cherones	Richard Day	October 19, 1994	C320	24.2
17	6	"So Funny"	Tom Cherones	Maria Semple	October 26, 1994	C317	24.1
18	7	"The Toast"	Tom Cherones	Suzanne Martin	November 9, 1994	C321	22.7
19	8	"Adam's Birthday"	Tom Cherones	Maria Semple	November 16, 1994	C322	22.2
20	9	"The Trainer"	Tom Cherones	Holly Hester	November 23, 1994	C323	19.1
21	10	"Mrs. Koger"	Tom Cherones	Richard Day	November 30, 1994	C324	23.0
22	11	"Ellen's New Friend"	Tom Cherones	Mark Driscoll	December 7, 1994	C325	20.9
23	12	"The Christmas Show"	Tom Cherones	Suzanne Martin	December 14, 1994	C326	22.8
24	13	"Ellen's Improvement"	Tom Cherones	Jonathan Stark & Tracy Newman	January 4, 1995	C327	23.6
25	14	"The Apartment Hunt"	Tom Cherones	Mark Driscoll	January 11, 1995	C328	22.7
26	15	"The Spa"	Tom Cherones	Suzanne Martin	January 25, 1995	C329	20.1
27	16	"Ballet Class"	Tom Cherones	Richard Day	February 8, 1995	C330	20.2
28	17	"Guns 'N Ellen"	Tom Cherones	Jonathan Stark & Tracy Newman	February 15, 1995	C331	21.8
29	18	"The Sleep Clinic"	Tom Cherones	Mark Driscoll	February 22, 1995	C332	21.4
30	19	"Gladiators"	David Owen Trainor	Richard Day	March 1, 1995	C333	21.6
31	20	"$5,000"	Tom Cherones	Jonathan Stark & Tracy Newman	March 22, 1995	C334	20.8
32	21	"Three Strikes"	Tom Cherones	Pamela Eells & Sally Lapiduss	March 29, 1995	C335	22.7
33	22	"The Therapy Episode"	Tom Cherones	Story by : Holly Hester; Teleplay by : Mark Driscoll & Holly Hester	May 3, 1995	C336	18.7
34	23	"Thirty Kilo Man (Part 1)"	Tom Cherones	Suzanne Martin	May 10, 1995	C337	17.4
35	24	"Thirty Kilo Man (Part 2)"	Tom Cherones	Maria Semple	May 17, 1995	C338	19.7

=== Season 3 (1995–96) ===
No. overall	No. in season	Title	Directed by	Written by	Original release date	Prod. code	U.S. viewers (millions)
36	1	"Shake, Rattle and Rubble"	Robby Benson	DeAnn Heline & Eileen Heisler	September 13, 1995	C339	17.5
37	2	"These Successful Friends of Mine"	Robby Benson	Tom Leopold	September 20, 1995	C340	17.9
38	3	"The Shower Scene"	Robby Benson	Dava Savel	September 27, 1995	C341	16.8
39	4	"The Bridges of L.A. County"	Robby Benson	Tracy Newman & Jonathan Stark	October 4, 1995	C342	16.7
40	5	"Hello, I Must Be Going"	Robby Benson	Daryl Rowland & Lisa DeBenedictus	October 18, 1995	C343	14.6
41	6	"Trick or Treat – Who Cares?"	Robby Benson	Alex Herschlag	November 1, 1995	C344	17.9
42	7	"She Ain't Friendly, She's My Mother"	Robby Benson	David Flebotte	November 8, 1995	C345	17.5
43	8	"Salad Days"	Robby Benson	Dava Savel	November 15, 1995	C346	17.3
44	9	"The Movie Show"	Robby Benson	Jonathan Stark & Tracy Newman	November 22, 1995	C348	16.2
45	10	"What's Up, Ex-Doc?"	Robby Benson	Lisa DeBenedictus & Daryl Rowland	November 29, 1995	C347	13.9
46	11	"Ellen's Choice"	Robby Benson	Alex Herschlag	December 6, 1995	C349	15.4
47	12	"Do You Fear What I Fear?"	Robby Benson	David Flebotte	December 20, 1995	C350	14.6
48	13	"Horshack's Law"	Robby Benson	Tom Leopold	January 3, 1996	C351	16.5
49	14	"Morgan, P.I."	Robby Benson	Dava Savel	January 10, 1996	C352	16.2
50	15	"Oh, Sweet Rapture"	Robby Benson	Jonathan Stark & Tracy Newman	January 24, 1996	C353	16.1
51	16	"Witness"	Robby Benson	Alex Herschlag	February 7, 1996	C354	15.2
52	17	"Ellen: With Child"	Robby Benson	Lisa DeBenedictus & Daryl Rowland	February 14, 1996	C355	14.1
53	18	"Lobster Diary"	Robby Benson	Jonathan Stark & Tracy Newman	February 21, 1996	C356	14.8
54	19	"Two Ring Circus"	Robby Benson	David Flebotte	February 28, 1996	C357	14.6
55	20	"A Penney Saved..."	Robby Benson	Jennifer Fisher	March 13, 1996	C358	15.1
56	21	"Too Hip for the Room"	Robby Benson	Story by : Tom Leopold; Teleplay by : Matt Goldman	March 20, 1996	C359	14.6
57	22	"Two Mammograms and a Wedding"	Robby Benson	Dava Savel	April 3, 1996	C360	15.6
58	23	"Go Girlz"	Robby Benson	Lisa DeBenedictus & Daryl Rowland	May 1, 1996	C361	13.4
59	24	"When the Vow Breaks: Part 1"	Robby Benson	David Flebotte & Alex Herschlag	May 8, 1996	C362	13.5
60	N–A	"The Tape"	Andy Ackerman	David S. Rosenthal	May 14, 1996	C307	15.3
61	25	"When the Vow Breaks: Part 2"	Robby Benson	DeAnn Heline & Eileen Heisler	May 15, 1996	C363	13.8
62	N–A	"The Mugging"	Rob Schiller	David S. Rosenthal	May 21, 1996	C304	14.3

=== Season 4 (1996–97) ===
No. overall	No. in season	Title	Directed by	Written by	Original release date	Prod. code	U.S. viewers (millions)
63	1	"Give Me Equity or Give Me Death"	Gil Junger	Dava Savel	September 18, 1996	C364	12.7
64	2	"A Deer Head for Joe"	Gil Junger	Mark Driscoll	September 25, 1996	C365	12.3
65	3	"Splitsville, Man"	Gil Junger	Matt Goldman	October 2, 1996	C366	13.4
66	4	"The Parent Trap"	Gil Junger	Jonathan Stark & Tracy Newman	October 16, 1996	C368	12.3
67	5	"Looking Out for Number One"	Gil Junger	David Flebotte	October 23, 1996	C367	11.6
68	6	"The Bubble Gum Incident"	Gil Junger	David Walpert	October 30, 1996	C369	11.7
69	7	"Harold and Ellen"	Michael Lembeck	Alex Herschlag	November 6, 1996	C370	11.8
70	8	"Not So Great Expectations"	Gil Junger	Ellen Idelson & Rob Lotterstein	November 13, 1996	C372	13.1
71	9	"The Pregnancy Test"	Alan Myerson	Mark Driscoll	November 20, 1996	C371	12.7
72	10	"Kiss My Bum"	Gil Junger	David Walpert	November 27, 1996	C373	13.3
73	11	"Bowl, Baby, Bowl"	Lorraine Sevre-Richmond	Vance DeGeneres	December 4, 1996	C374	15.86
74	12	"Fleas Navidad"	Alan Myerson	Jonathan Stark & Tracy Newman	December 18, 1996	C375	16.18
75	13	"Alone Again... Naturally"	Alan Myerson	Mark Wilding	January 8, 1997	C376	17.09
76	14	"Joe's Kept Secret"	John Tracy	Dava Savel	January 15, 1997	C377	17.38
77	15	"Makin' Whoopie"	Iris Dugow	David Flebotte	January 22, 1997	C378	14.68
78	16	"Ellen Unplugged"	David Owen Trainor	Alex Herschlag	February 5, 1997	C379	15.51
79	17	"Ellen's Deaf Comedy Jam"	Gil Junger	Jennifer Fisher	February 12, 1997	C380	15.61
80	18	"Hello, Dalai"	Gil Junger	Ellen Idelson & Rob Lotterstein	February 19, 1997	C381	15.21
81	19	"Secrets & Ellen"	Gil Junger	Peter Tolan	February 26, 1997	C382	14.57
82	20	"Reversal of Misfortune"	Gil Junger	Matt Goldman	March 4, 1997	C383	12.73
83	21	"The Clip Show Patient"	Gil Junger	Vance DeGeneres & David Walpert	April 8, 1997	C384	12.20
84	22	"The Puppy Episode"	Gil Junger	Story by : Ellen DeGeneres; Teleplay by : Mark Driscoll & Dava Savel & Tracy Newman & Jonathan Stark	April 30, 1997	C385	36.15
85	23	"The Puppy Episode"	Gil Junger	Story by : Ellen DeGeneres; Teleplay by : Mark Driscoll & Dava Savel & Tracy Newman & Jonathan Stark	April 30, 1997	C386	36.15
86	24	"Hello Muddah, Hello Faddah"	Gil Junger	Jan Nash	May 7, 1997	C387	17.95
87	25	"Moving On"	Gil Junger	Alex Herschlag & David Flebotte	May 14, 1997	C388	16.35

=== Season 5 (1997–98) ===
No. overall	No. in season	Title	Directed by	Written by	Original release date	Prod. code	U.S. viewers (millions)
88	1	"Guys or Dolls"	Gil Junger	Ric Swartzlander	September 24, 1997	C402	11.99
89	2	"Social Climber"	Gil Junger	Mike Larsen	October 1, 1997	C401	17.32
90	3	"Roommates"	Gail Mancuso	Dan Cohen & F.J. Pratt	October 8, 1997	C403	15.08
91	4	"Gay Yellow Pages"	Gil Junger	Tod Himmel & Lisa K. Nelson	October 15, 1997	C405	15.53
92	5	"Just Coffee"	Gail Mancuso	Maxine Lapiduss	October 29, 1997	C404	13.36
93	6	"G.I. Ellen"	Gil Junger	Mike Larsen	November 5, 1997	C407	12.61
94	7	"Public Display of Affection"	Gail Mancuso	David Walpert	November 12, 1997	C406	14.78
95	8	"Emma"	Gail Mancuso	Lawrence Broch	November 19, 1997	C410	13.72
96	9	"Like a Virgin"	Gail Mancuso	Jane Espenson	November 26, 1997	C408	11.24
97	10	"All Ellen, All the Time"	Gil Junger	Ric Swartzlander	December 3, 1997	C409	14.15
98	11	"Break Up"	Gil Junger	Matt Berry	December 17, 1997	C411	12.83
99	12	"Womyn Fest"	Lorraine Sevre-Richmond	Jane Espenson	January 7, 1998	C413	12.86
100	13	"The Funeral"	Gil Junger	Matt Berry	January 14, 1998	C412	11.83
101	14	"Escape from L.A."	Gil Junger	Lisa K. Himmel & Tod Nelson	January 28, 1998	C415	11.02
102	15	"Ellen in Focus"	Gil Junger	Leif Sandaas	February 11, 1998	C417	10.27
103	16	"Neighbors"	Gail Mancuso	Story by : Kit Pongetti; Teleplay by : Cynthia Greenburg & Charmaine Noel Dixon	February 18, 1998	C416	8.49
104	17	"It's a Gay, Gay, Gay, Gay World!"	Gil Junger	David Walpert	February 25, 1998	C414	9.58
105	18	"Hospital"	Gail Mancuso	Matt Berry & Ric Swartzlander	March 4, 1998	C419	12.32
106	19	"Ellen: A Hollywood Tribute"	Gil Junger	Tim Doyle	May 13, 1998	C421	9.91
107	20	"Ellen: A Hollywood Tribute"	Gil Junger	Tim Doyle	May 13, 1998	C422	9.91
108	21	"When Ellen Talks, People Listen"	Gil Junger	Mike Larsen	July 15, 1998	C420	6.34
109	22	"Vows"	Lorraine Sevre-Richmond	F.J. Pratt & Dan Cohen	July 22, 1998	C418	5.58

== See also ==
- List of awards and nominations received by Ellen
