= Ellen season 4 =

Ellen
- Season 4
- No. of episodes: 25

Release
- Original network: ABC
- Original release: September 17, 1996 – May 13, 1997

Season chronology
- ← Previous; Season 3 Next → Season 5

The fourth season of Ellen, an American television series, began September 17, 1996 and ended on May 13, 1997. It aired on ABC. The region 1 DVD was released on September 26, 2006. This season is most famous for "The Puppy Episode" outing the fictional Ellen Morgan, which aired on the same day Ellen DeGeneres came out on Oprah. Almost every episode beforehand contained several hints.

== Cast ==
=== Main cast ===
- Ellen DeGeneres as Ellen Morgan
- Joely Fisher as Paige Clark
- David Anthony Higgins as Joe Farrell
- Clea Lewis as Audrey Penney
- Jeremy Piven as Spence Kovak

== Episodes ==
No. overall	No. in season	Title	Directed by	Written by	Original release date	Prod. code	U.S. viewers (millions)
63	1	"Give Me Equity or Give Me Death"	Gil Junger	Dava Savel	September 18, 1996	C364	12.7
Ellen complains she can't afford her own home while rejecting offers to sell her bookstore.
64	2	"A Deer Head for Joe"	Gil Junger	Mark Driscoll	September 25, 1996	C365	12.3
Having sold her bookstore, Ellen has a new boss, Ed, who mounts a deer head on the wall and refuses to take it down. When he fires Joe, Ellen steals the head and blackmails Ed for it.
65	3	"Splitsville, Man"	Gil Junger	Matt Goldman	October 2, 1996	C366	13.4
At the beginning of the episode, Ellen literally comes out of the closet of a home she's considering purchasing. Ellen's parents decide to separate, and Ellen has more of a problem with it than they do. Ellen calls a family meeting, then runs away from home.
66	4	"The Parent Trap"	Gil Junger	Jonathan Stark & Tracy Newman	October 16, 1996	C368	12.3
Ellen tries to get her parents back together by recreating their honeymoon. She enlists all of her friends to help, but the plan fails. Meanwhile, Spence gets a job at Paige's office, and causes Barrett to quit. Paige orders Spence to get Barrett back.
67	5	"Looking Out for Number One"	Gil Junger	David Flebotte	October 23, 1996	C367	11.6
Ellen sees her psychiatrist urinating in a parking lot, causing her not to take her advice seriously.
68	6	"The Bubble Gum Incident"	Gil Junger	David Walpert	October 30, 1996	C369	11.7
More than twenty-five years later, Ellen still can't tell Paige that she's the one who put bubble gum in her hair at camp. Paige looks forward to the summer camp reunion because she wants revenge on Megan, who she believed had put bubble gum in her hair at summer camp one year.
69	7	"Harold and Ellen"	Michael Lembeck	Alex Herschlag	November 6, 1996	C370	11.8
When Ellen's father, Harold, injures his back and Ellen accidentally falls off a ladder, injuring her neck, she must spend an entire evening caring for her father, while wearing a neck brace. Meanwhile, Spence gets a wedding invitation from an ex, irritating Paige.
70	8	"Not So Great Expectations"	Gil Junger	Ellen Idelson & Rob Lotterstein	November 13, 1996	C372	13.1
Ellen's mother, Lois, signs up with a dating agency and meets a man named Vic. Ellen is worried about what Vic is like, but must sign up to the agency herself in order to investigate him. She then follows the two to a Country and Western club to try and break them up.
71	9	"The Pregnancy Test"	Alan Myerson	Mark Driscoll	November 20, 1996	C371	12.7
To ease Paige's worries about a missed period, Ellen and Audrey take a pregnancy test with her. However, an accidental mix-up and a single positive test means one of the three is pregnant but no-one knows who. Meanwhile, a life saving experience at the hospital causes Spence to rethink his life of being a doctor.
72	10	"Kiss My Bum"	Gil Junger	David Walpert	November 27, 1996	C373	13.3
Ellen volunteers at a homeless shelter, and invites a man she meets, Perry, to Thanksgiving dinner. All goes well until the guests realise Perry is homeless, and react negatively.
73	11	"Bowl, Baby, Bowl"	Lorraine Sevre-Richmond	Vance DeGeneres	December 4, 1996	C374	15.86
After a friendly bowling game, Ellen and her boss become very competitive. Ed is a sore loser and takes it out on the rest of staff. In an attempt to make up for his grouchiness, Ed takes Ellen out to dinner and a game of pool, which he wins, and Ellen becomes a sore loser herself.
74	12	"Fleas Navidad"	Alan Myerson	Jonathan Stark & Tracy Newman	December 18, 1996	C375	16.18
Ellen tries to find a dog-sitter so she and Paige can go on holiday to Mexico. She sends Paige on ahead while she drops the dog off at a shelter, but finds herself caring for him instead. Ellen Morgan shamelessly plugs Ellen DeGeneres's new comedy CD and wonders "if the rumors about her are true."
75	13	"Alone Again... Naturally"	Alan Myerson	Mark Wilding	January 8, 1997	C376	17.09
Ellen tries going to a romantic French restaurant all by herself. Meanwhile Spence and Joe house-sit for Paige, but accidentally set her kitchen on fire.
76	14	"Joe's Kept Secret"	John Tracy	Dava Savel	January 15, 1997	C377	17.38
Joe is being kept by a wealthy woman, Madeleine (Florence Henderson), but after she dumps him, she starts spoiling Ellen with expensive gifts and matching outfits. Ellen goes along with it at first because Madeleine helped Ellen get a building permit to add an extension to her house.
77	15	"Makin' Whoopie"	Iris Dugow	David Flebotte	January 22, 1997	C378	14.68
Ellen gives blood and then goes to a wine-tasting party held by Spence's boss. Alcohol and blood loss combine to have a strong effect on Ellen's inhibitions.
78	16	"Ellen Unplugged"	David Owen Trainor	Alex Herschlag	February 5, 1997	C379	15.51
For her birthday, Ellen gets to go to Rock 'n Roll Fantasy Camp. Her friends tell her she can be anyone she wants: Melissa Etheridge, k.d. lang, the Indigo Girls... Tina Turner. Ellen wants to leave after a traumatic duet with Bonnie Raitt, but Paige tells her she needs to be bolder. Ellen is inspired to write a song.
79	17	"Ellen's Deaf Comedy Jam"	Gil Junger	Jennifer Fisher	February 12, 1997	C380	15.61
Audrey falls in love with Brian, a deaf actor in a sign language production of Shakespeare's Romeo and Juliet. Ellen and Audrey have a fight when Ellen claims Brian made a pass at her in sign language.
80	18	"Hello, Dalai"	Gil Junger	Ellen Idelson & Rob Lotterstein	February 19, 1997	C381	15.21
Peter and Ellen go to the Dalai's spiritual workshop. There Peter tries to trick Ellen into admitting she's gay. Meanwhile, the book store is robbed, and Audrey, Joe, Spence, and Paige are trapped together.
81	19	"Secrets & Ellen"	Gil Junger	Peter Tolan	February 26, 1997	C382	14.57
Ellen's grandmother comes to town, and her parents ask her to pretend they're still married, and that Ellen is married to Joe. Meanwhile, Paige takes Spence to Las Vegas, where he develops amnesia.
82	20	"Reversal of Misfortune"	Gil Junger	Matt Goldman	March 4, 1997	C383	12.73
Ellen has come to terms with her parents' divorce, so much so that she is pushing them to sign the papers to make it final. But it turns out they want to get back together but Ellen has been getting in the way.
83	21	"The Clip Show Patient"	Gil Junger	Vance DeGeneres & David Walpert	April 8, 1997	C384	12.20
Ellen volunteers at a local hospital and gets talking to a patient about how he ended up in hospital. However, her constant interruptions with stories about herself annoy him. (This episode is a clip show: the frame story is Ellen talking to a hospital patient who is bandaged up from head to toe).
84	22	"The Puppy Episode"	Gil Junger	Story by : Ellen DeGeneres; Teleplay by : Mark Driscoll & Dava Savel & Tracy Newman & Jonathan Stark	April 30, 1997	C385	36.15
85	23	"The Puppy Episode"	Gil Junger	Story by : Ellen DeGeneres; Teleplay by : Mark Driscoll & Dava Savel & Tracy Newman & Jonathan Stark	April 30, 1997	C386	36.15
A visit from Richard, an old boyfriend, and his female boss, Susan (Laura Dern), makes Ellen gradually realize she's gay. Ellen has dinner with Richard but winds up in a late-night conversation with Susan after being unable to have sex with Richard. Ellen discusses these developments with her new therapist (Oprah Winfrey). Ellen comes out to her friends, who all take it well except Paige, and thinks she is getting closer to Susan. She is disappointed to learn that Susan is in a long-term committed relationship.
86	24	"Hello Muddah, Hello Faddah"	Gil Junger	Jan Nash	May 7, 1997	C387	17.95
Ellen takes her parents to dinner and tells them she is gay. Her mother is bewildered and convinced it is a phase, and her father storms out. Lois agrees to attend a support group however, and both parents change their minds when a member abuses Ellen.
87	25	"Moving On"	Gil Junger	Alex Herschlag & David Flebotte	May 14, 1997	C388	16.35
Ellen comes out to her boss, Ed, who expresses a homophobic attitude and refuses to let her babysit his children because of it, and she quits her job. Paige, however, comes round and accepts Ellen's sexuality.
