= Ellen season 3 =

Ellen
- Season 3
- No. of episodes: 27

Release
- Original network: ABC
- Original release: September 13, 1995 – May 21, 1996

Season chronology
- ← Previous; Season 2 Next → Season 4

The third season of Ellen, an American television series, began September 13, 1995 and ended on May 21, 1996. It aired on ABC. The region 1 DVD was released on February 28, 2006. This season also contains two episodes that were meant to be a part of season one, "The Tape" and "The Mugging".

== Cast ==
=== Main cast ===
- Ellen DeGeneres as Ellen Morgan
- Joely Fisher as Paige Clark
- Arye Gross as Adam Green (Episodes 1–5)
- David Anthony Higgins as Joe Farrell
- Clea Lewis as Audrey Penney
- Jeremy Piven as Spence Kovak

== Episodes ==
No. overall	No. in season	Title	Directed by	Written by	Original release date	Prod. code	U.S. viewers (millions)
36	1	"Shake, Rattle and Rubble"	Robby Benson	DeAnn Heline & Eileen Heisler	September 13, 1995	C339	17.5
After an earthquake destroys Buy The Book, it takes the effort of Ellen's cousin, Spence, to rally her friends to help rebuild the bookstore.
37	2	"These Successful Friends of Mine"	Robby Benson	Tom Leopold	September 20, 1995	C340	17.9
As Paige gets a new job as a development executive and Adam finds out that his photograph will be published, Ellen begins to question her life and leaves for a journey to find her dream, only to be thrown out from the first bus.
38	3	"The Shower Scene"	Robby Benson	Dava Savel	September 27, 1995	C341	16.8
Ellen accidentally tapes an episode of Thirtysomething over Paige's sister giving birth to twins.
39	4	"The Bridges of L.A. County"	Robby Benson	Tracy Newman & Jonathan Stark	October 4, 1995	C342	16.7
Buy The Book celebrates its reopening and Spence has a one-night stand with a new member of the reading group. Christine Taylor guest stars.
40	5	"Hello, I Must Be Going"	Robby Benson	Daryl Rowland & Lisa DeBenedictus	October 18, 1995	C343	14.6
Adam gets offered a job in London, but before he leaves, he must make a confession.
41	6	"Trick or Treat – Who Cares?"	Robby Benson	Alex Herschlag	November 1, 1995	C344	17.9
Spence mopes around Ellen's apartment while she tries in vain to cheer him up. Meanwhile, Audrey begins working in Buy The Book, despite never having been hired. Paige is overwhelmed by the number of scripts she has to read but finds help from a member of Ellen's book club.
42	7	"She Ain't Friendly, She's My Mother"	Robby Benson	David Flebotte	November 8, 1995	C345	17.5
Following the suggestion by her therapist, Ellen's mother decides that she should become friends with her daughter. The plan backfires when the discussion turns to sex over a game of bridge.
43	8	"Salad Days"	Robby Benson	Dava Savel	November 15, 1995	C346	17.3
Martha Stewart helps Ellen prepare dinner for her friends.
44	9	"The Movie Show"	Robby Benson	Jonathan Stark & Tracy Newman	November 22, 1995	C348	16.2
When Paige realizes that she's been ignoring Ellen after getting her new job, she arranges for Buy The Book to serve as a set for a new Meg Ryan movie. To Ellen's disappointment, only Carrie Fisher makes an appearance. Meanwhile, Spence is trying to assemble a bjork.
45	10	"What's Up, Ex-Doc?"	Robby Benson	Lisa DeBenedictus & Daryl Rowland	November 29, 1995	C347	13.9
Spence has to face his father's wrath when finally reveals to him that he's not going to be a doctor. Meanwhile, a movie theater opens next to Buy The Book and the loud sounds prove to be a major source of annoyance.
46	11	"Ellen's Choice"	Robby Benson	Alex Herschlag	December 6, 1995	C349	15.4
Ellen's reading group gets invited to a book discussion show on television, but the group is too big for the show. So it's up to Ellen to decide which members of the group get to go. Meanwhile, Joe's hand gets injured and he reluctantly allows Audrey to cover for him. Christine Taylor guest stars.
47	12	"Do You Fear What I Fear?"	Robby Benson	David Flebotte	December 20, 1995	C350	14.6
Ellen gets depressed when her parents give a burial plot to her as a present, but eventually the entire gang end up spending their Christmas Eve at the cemetery.
48	13	"Horshack's Law"	Robby Benson	Tom Leopold	January 3, 1996	C351	16.5
The attempts to reach John Travolta's birthday party with a limousine ride fail repeatedly.
49	14	"Morgan, P.I."	Robby Benson	Dava Savel	January 10, 1996	C352	16.2
After Buy The Book's cash register is robbed, Ellen helps the police to solve a security system fraud.
50	15	"Oh, Sweet Rapture"	Robby Benson	Jonathan Stark & Tracy Newman	January 24, 1996	C353	16.1
Audrey buys a new car and gets lured into a cult-like owner's group. Meanwhile, Paige tries to make friends with a child. Kathy Griffin guest stars.
51	16	"Witness"	Robby Benson	Alex Herschlag	February 7, 1996	C354	15.2
Ellen tries to help Spence pass a mock trial exam by taking on a role of a witness. In the bookstore, gender lines are being inverted over a game. The Del Rubio Triplets sing the theme song.
52	17	"Ellen: With Child"	Robby Benson	Lisa DeBenedictus & Daryl Rowland	February 14, 1996	C355	14.1
Ellen agrees to babysit for a few days and winds up having to explain sex to the child. Rupaul joins Ellen for the opening credits sequence.
53	18	"Lobster Diary"	Robby Benson	Jonathan Stark & Tracy Newman	February 21, 1996	C356	14.8
Ellen gains celebrity status after rescuing lobsters from a restaurant. Mary Tyler Moore guest stars.
54	19	"Two Ring Circus"	Robby Benson	David Flebotte	February 28, 1996	C357	14.6
Paige accepts a marriage proposal from her boyfriend Matt, but she is unhappy with her engagement ring.
55	20	"A Penney Saved..."	Robby Benson	Jennifer Fisher	March 13, 1996	C358	15.1
Audrey's parents invest $100,000 in Buy The Book to prevent her from getting fired. Carol Kane guest stars as Audrey's mother.
56	21	"Too Hip for the Room"	Robby Benson	Story by : Tom Leopold; Teleplay by : Matt Goldman	March 20, 1996	C359	14.6
Ellen and Joe try to make the book store appear more cool by hiring a band. Meanwhile, Spence pretends that Ellen's apartment is up for sale to get close to two attractive women looking to buy a new apartment.
57	22	"Two Mammograms and a Wedding"	Robby Benson	Dava Savel	April 3, 1996	C360	15.6
In the week before Paige's wedding, Ellen fears that Paige's marriage will end their lifelong friendship. So, while nervously awaiting a mammogram, Ellen latches onto Chloe, another fellow mammogram patient, in the waiting room. But Ellen soon after discovers that making new friends isn't as easy as it used to be. Janeane Garofalo guest stars.
58	23	"Go Girlz"	Robby Benson	Lisa DeBenedictus & Daryl Rowland	May 1, 1996	C361	13.4
The night before the wedding, Ellen and Audrey throw a bachelorette slumber party for a despondent Paige. They invite over a male stripper, a psychic, and Paige's neurotic, high-powered boss, Lorna Irons. Kathy Najimy guest stars.
59	24	"When the Vow Breaks: Part 1"	Robby Benson	David Flebotte & Alex Herschlag	May 8, 1996	C362	13.5
Ellen tries to make Paige's wedding day perfect while Joe enjoys free calls form a broken payphone. Connie Britton guest stars as Paige's sister.
60	N–A	"The Tape"	Andy Ackerman	David S. Rosenthal	May 14, 1996	C307	15.3
When Anita's parents arrive for a quick visit, Ellen, Adam and Holly race against time to try to retrieve a racy videotape of Anita and her boyfriend together that lands in the hands of Anita's parents. Adam managed to succeed in switching tapes, but when Anita finds out about the videotape, she switches the tapes too, leading to a surprise for all parties involved. Meanwhile, Ellen is turned off after listening to her current boyfriend doing something tasteless over the phone. Note: This episode was supposed to be aired in Season One, as evident by the fact that all the Season One characters are present.
61	25	"When the Vow Breaks: Part 2"	Robby Benson	DeAnn Heline & Eileen Heisler	May 15, 1996	C363	13.8
Having walked in on Spence and Paige kissing, they both give Ellen different versions of how this happened. Ellen tries to persuade Paige to call off the wedding, but she refuses. Meanwhile, during the delay in the ceremony, Peter and Barrett discuss their suspicions about Paige getting cold feet. Connie Britton guest stars as Paige's sister.
62	N–A	"The Mugging"	Rob Schiller	David S. Rosenthal	May 21, 1996	C304	14.3
Adam sees his girlfriend get mugged, but is afraid to come forward. Note:This episode was also supposed to be aired in Season One, as evident by the fact that all the Season One characters are present.
