= Ellen season 1 =

Ellen
- Season 1
- No. of episodes: 11

Release
- Original network: ABC
- Original release: March 29 – August 30, 1994

Season chronology
- Next → Season 2

The first season of Ellen, an American television series, began March 29, 1994 and ended on August 30, 1994. It originally aired on ABC as These Friends of Mine. The region 1 DVD was released on September 28, 2004. Two episodes that were meant to be a part of Season One, "The Tape" and "The Mugging", and aired near the end of Season Three, are included on the Season One DVD set.

== Cast ==
=== Main cast ===
- Ellen DeGeneres as Ellen Morgan
- Holly Fulger as Holly
- Arye Gross as Adam Green
- Maggie Wheeler as Anita Warrell (7 episodes)
- David Anthony Higgins as Joe Farrell (6 episodes)
- Cristine Rose as Susan (3 episodes)
- Clea Lewis as Audrey Penney (1 episode)

== Episodes ==
| No. overall | No. in season | Title | Directed by | Written by | Original release date | Prod. code | U.S. viewers (millions) |
|---|---|---|---|---|---|---|---|
| 1 | 1 | "Pilot" | Neal Marlens | David S. Rosenthal & Carol Black & Neal Marlens | March 29, 1994 | 5286 | 26.9 |
Ellen goes to renew her driver's licence, but the photos for it keep coming out badly. While waiting in line with her, Holly meets a man named Roger, beginning a relationship with him that concerns her friends. Note: Debut of Ellen DeGeneres as Ellen Morgan, Holly Fulger as Holly, Arye Gross as Adam Green, Maggie Wheeler as Anita Warrell.
| 2 | 2 | "The Anchor" | Rob Schiller | David S. Rosenthal | March 30, 1994 | C305 | 29.9 |
Ellen tests her new call waiting system by telling the person on the line that she doesn't like her annoying friend Audrey. Unfortunately, the person on the other is Audrey herself. Holly experiments with tissues stuffed down her bra and gets a date. Note: Debut of Clea Lewis as Audrey Penney; this is the character's only appearance in season 1.
| 3 | 3 | "A Kiss is Still A Kiss" | Andrew D. Weyman | Suzanne Martin | April 6, 1994 | C311 | 29.5 |
Ellen, Holly, and Adam decide to answer personal ads in order to get a date. Ellen's date seems to be perfect, until she discovers he cannot kiss well. Note: Debut of David Anthony Higgins as Joe Farrell. Maggie Wheeler does not appear in this episode.
| 4 | 4 | "The Class Reunion" | Rob Schiller | Mark Wilding | April 13, 1994 | C306 | 27.6 |
At her fifteenth high school class reunion, Ellen decides to pretend she's a married cardiologist in order to impress her old classmates. However, her fake front may do more harm than good when she runs into her old high school crush. Note: David Anthony Higgins does not appear in this episode.
| 5 | 5 | "The Promotion" | Rob Schiller | David S. Rosenthal | April 20, 1994 | C302 | 25.0 |
Hoping for a promotion, Ellen buys a gift for her boss, Susan, to congratulate her on her baby, but is accidentally overheard making disparaging remarks about Susan. Anita and Holly try to earn a profit by selling some Mexican artwork. Note: Debut of Cristina Rose as Susan. David Anthony Higgins does not appear in this episode.
| 6 | 6 | "The Hand That Robs the Cradle" | Andrew D. Weyman | Mark Driscoll | April 27, 1994 | C313 | 22.8 |
When Ellen dates a younger man (Peter Krause), she begins to feel that she is too old. In order to feel younger, Ellen tries acting "cool", but her change in personality ends up turning her new boyfriend away. Note: Cristina Rose and Maggie Wheeler do not appear in this episode.
| 7 | 7 | "The Go-Between" | Andrew D. Weyman | Mark Wilding | May 4, 1994 | C312 | 23.3 |
When Susan is dateless for an upcoming wedding, Ellen convinces her to go with Adam. But when Ellen finds out that Susan doesn't have the same feelings for Adam as Adam has for Susan, Ellen steps in only to find herself in a hard choice between her roommate and her boss. Note: Maggie Wheeler does not appear in this episode.
| 8 | 8 | "The Houseguest" | John Bowab | Warren Bell & David S. Rosenthal | May 24, 1994 | C314 | 23.3 |
Tracy, Ellen's cousin, comes for a visit, but ends up thinking Ellen was the one that ruined her Los Angeles vacation. Things only get worse when Tracy leaves with a motorcycle gang and Ellen has to chase them down. Note: Cristina Rose and Maggie Wheeler do not appear in this episode.
| 9 | 9 | "The Refrigerator" | Rob Schiller | Richard Day | August 9, 1994 | C303 | 18.2 |
Ellen's refrigerator dies, so Anita offers to buy her a new one with her employee discount. But when Anita begins dating the appliance section manager, they have to move the refrigerator to Anita's house so their scam isn't found out, which would result in Anita getting fired. However, switching refrigerators is easier said than done. Note: Cristina Rose and David Anthony Higgins do not appear in this episode.
| 10 | 10 | "The Soft Touch" | Andrew D. Weyman | Richard Day | August 23, 1994 | C310 | 18.7 |
Ellen thinks she cost a car salesman his job, so she gets him a job at her bookstore. Note: Cristina Rose and Maggie Wheeler do not appear in this episode.
| 11 | 11 | "The Boyfriend Stealer" | Andrew D. Weyman | David S. Rosenthal & Warren Bell | August 30, 1994 | C309 | 19.6 |
Ellen is worried that Holly's boyfriend, Steve, is coming on to her. The bookstore expands and adds a Coffee section, and the new barista, Joe Farrell, butts heads with Ellen. Note: Final episode of Cristina Rose as Susan. Maggie Wheeler does not appear in this episode.
| N–A | 12 | "The Mugging" | Rob Schiller | David S. Rosenthal | May 21, 1996 | C304 | 14.3 |
Adam sees his girlfriend get mugged, but is afraid to come forward. Note: This is a Season 1 episode that went unaired until Season 3 but is included on the Season 1 DVD and digital sets. Of the season 1 characters, only Ellen, Adam, Holly and Anita are featured.
| N–A | 13 | "The Tape" | Andy Ackerman | David S. Rosenthal | May 14, 1996 | C307 | 15.3 |
When Anita's parents arrive for a quick visit, Ellen, Adam and Holly race against time to try to retrieve a racy videotape of Anita and her boyfriend together that lands in the hands of Anita's parents. Adam managed to succeed in switching tapes, but when Anita finds out about the videotape, she switches the tapes too, leading to a surprise for all parties involved. Meanwhile, Ellen is turned off after listening to her current boyfriend doing something tasteless over the phone. Note: This is a Season 1 episode that went unaired until Season 3 but is included on the Season 1 DVD and digital sets. Of the season 1 characters, only Ellen, Adam, Holly and Anita are featured. Final appearance of Holly Fulger as Holly, and Maggie Wheeler as Anita Warrell.
