= Ellen season 2 =

Ellen
- Season 2
- No. of episodes: 24

Release
- Original network: ABC
- Original release: September 21, 1994 – May 17, 1995

Season chronology
- ← Previous; Season 1 Next → Season 3

The second season of Ellen, an American television series, began September 21, 1994 and ended on May 17, 1995. It aired on ABC. The region 1 DVD was released on February 22, 2005.

== Cast ==
=== Main cast ===
- Ellen DeGeneres as Ellen Morgan
- Joely Fisher as Paige Clark
- Arye Gross as Adam Green
- David Anthony Higgins as Joe Farrell
- Clea Lewis as Audrey Penney

== Episodes ==
No. overall	No. in season	Title	Directed by	Written by	Original release date	Prod. code	U.S. viewers (millions)
12	1	"The Dentist"	Tom Cherones	Mark Driscoll	September 21, 1994	C315	25.8
When Ellen chips her tooth, Paige suggests that she go to Dr. Dave, a handsome dentist. But after Ellen is given laughing gas, she embarrasses herself when she acts strangely under the influence of the gas. Meanwhile, Adam feels suffocated by his girlfriend and breaks up with her, but later regrets his decision.
13	2	"Saint Ellen"	Tom Cherones	Richard Day	September 28, 1994	C316	23.8
Ellen, Paige, and Adam sneak into a movie premiere by pretending to be someone else, but it turns out to be a charity benefit that they are believed to have donated a large amount to, and Ellen is plagued with guilt at the deception. To make up for it, she volunteers at The Helping Hand. This episode marks the first appearance of the recurring character Peter.
14	3	"The Thirty-Minute Man"	Tom Cherones	Suzanne Martin	October 5, 1994	C318	21.7
Ellen falls head over heels for Dan, a bookstore customer, whose visits she always looks forward to. However, Ellen's high hopes that they could get together are dashed when she learns that he's a pizza delivery man who takes his work very seriously.
15	4	"The Note"	Tom Cherones	David S. Rosenthal	October 12, 1994	C319	22.6
Ellen finds an unflattering note about her written by someone in her book club, and determined to find out who wrote it, sends Paige in as a mole.
16	5	"The Fix-Up"	Tom Cherones	Richard Day	October 19, 1994	C320	24.2
Ellen's mother sets Ellen up on a date with a childhood friend, Doug, whom Ellen remembers as the weird kid that ate bugs. Meanwhile, Adam enters a photography contest for women, and Paige loses her boss's car.
17	6	"So Funny"	Tom Cherones	Maria Semple	October 26, 1994	C317	24.1
Adam's friend Theresa (Kathy Najimy) visits and Ellen feels threatened when Theresa's funny stories are the life of the party. Ellen catches her at the airport to apologize and the plane takes off while she's still on-board. Meanwhile, Paige wishes her boyfriend would stop being a gentleman and take their relationship to the next level.
18	7	"The Toast"	Tom Cherones	Suzanne Martin	November 9, 1994	C321	22.7
Ellen's brother is getting married and Ellen gives a touching toast, but lets slip about his former fiancée, whom his current fiancée was unaware of.
19	8	"Adam's Birthday"	Tom Cherones	Maria Semple	November 16, 1994	C322	22.2
Ellen arranges a birthday party for Adam and invites all of their friends they went to college with. Adam then realizes that nothing in his life has changed since he left college, so he moves out. Ellen then deals with living on her own.
20	9	"The Trainer"	Tom Cherones	Holly Hester	November 23, 1994	C323	19.1
To help Paige please her boss, Ellen agrees to pretend to be his trainer at the gym. The boss likes Ellen so much that he offers her a development job at his company, angering Paige.
21	10	"Mrs. Koger"	Tom Cherones	Richard Day	November 30, 1994	C324	23.0
Ellen's grouchy old neighbor dies shortly after Ellen yells at her for being mean and Ellen thinks she killed her. Meanwhile, Ellen hires a new manager, Lloyd (Nick Bakay), who makes some drastic changes, but then buckles under the pressure.
22	11	"Ellen's New Friend"	Tom Cherones	Mark Driscoll	December 7, 1994	C325	20.9
Ellen does not want to hurt Audrey, so she reluctantly goes out to lunch with her, Paige, and Audrey's friend, Jessica, a travel writer. Ellen wants to get closer to Jessica, without hurting Audrey, so she resorts to lying to go to a party for Jessica in order to avoid going out with Audrey. Meanwhile, Adam inherits some historical family letters with some hysterical implications. Also, Joe has to swear off coffee after a doctor's visit that has diagnosed him with a stomach ulcer.
23	12	"The Christmas Show"	Tom Cherones	Suzanne Martin	December 14, 1994	C326	22.8
Ellen has a new boyfriend, Greg, who is too nice. So Ellen tries to break up with him, but she cannot find the right time before Christmas and ends up at his house singing Christmas carols. Meanwhile, Joe and his new girlfriend, Stephanie, are scaring customers away with their on-again, off-again relationship. Also, Paige agonizes over what gift to get for her long-estranged, overly sensitive mother for Christmas.
24	13	"Ellen's Improvement"	Tom Cherones	Jonathan Stark & Tracy Newman	January 4, 1995	C327	23.6
Ellen goes on a scholastic trip to a museum with Adam and Paige to expand her cultural horizons where she meets an attractive English college professor. Desperate to win his affections, Ellen tries to impress him after he asks her out to a jazz concert and then to an opera. But when Ellen introduces him to the world of TV, his fixation on it makes their relationship boring. Meanwhile, Joe moves in the bookstore after having a fight with Stephanie.
25	14	"The Apartment Hunt"	Tom Cherones	Mark Driscoll	January 11, 1995	C328	22.7
Ellen is doing everything she can to keep the terminally annoying and obnoxious Audrey from moving into her neighborhood. Ellen helps Audrey locate a cheap house, but it gets destroyed in an earthquake, so Audrey moves in with Ellen. When Ellen moves to a guest house, it burns down, then Audrey finds a place of her own... in Ellen's building. Meanwhile, Paige dates an alternate juror for a high-profile Hollywood murder trial, and Adam tries to catch a newspaper thief. Also, Joe tries to catch some rats infesting the bookstore, while the animal lover Stephanie objects to killing the rodents.
26	15	"The Spa"	Tom Cherones	Suzanne Martin	January 25, 1995	C329	20.1
Paige persuades Ellen to relieve her job stress at a posh health spa she is going to for the weekend, which brings out tension between both of them over the painful massages, mud baths, and dinner schedules. Eventually, Ellen and Paige try to sneak out of the place for some "real food" but get literally get stuck on the fence surrounding the complex. Meanwhile, Adam tries to broaden his circle of friends, starting with Joe.
27	16	"Ballet Class"	Tom Cherones	Richard Day	February 8, 1995	C330	20.2
Ellen goes to ballet class but is not very good at it. She still manages to get into the dance recital, which includes music from Giselle by Adolphe Adam.
28	17	"Guns 'N Ellen"	Tom Cherones	Jonathan Stark & Tracy Newman	February 15, 1995	C331	21.8
After her apartment is robbed, a paranoid Ellen goes on a safety spree by taking personal defense classes from a police detective, purchasing trigger alarms, and even having a life-size dummy for protection. But her obsession with security makes her a model of insecurity to Paige, while Audrey tries to persuade Ellen to have a gun around.
29	18	"The Sleep Clinic"	Tom Cherones	Mark Driscoll	February 22, 1995	C332	21.4
Ellen and Audrey both have erotic dreams about Adam, but whereas Ellen seeks answers with a therapist, Audrey vows to make the dreams realities. After being seduced by Audrey, Adam thinks it was a mistake which leads him to fake a relationship with Ellen.
30	19	"Gladiators"	David Owen Trainor	Richard Day	March 1, 1995	C333	21.6
At Adam's advice, Ellen reluctantly becomes a contestant on the TV sports show "American Gladiators." Ellen becomes smitten with fellow gladiator Nitro, whom Adam tries to bond with. But on the day of the competition, Ellen becomes fighting mad when her female combatant, Ice, ruins her budding romance with Nitro. Meanwhile, Audrey decides to sue Paige after they collide with each others cars, and Joe tries acting nice to the customers after getting a hate note from an unknown regular customer.
31	20	"$5,000"	Tom Cherones	Jonathan Stark & Tracy Newman	March 22, 1995	C334	20.8
Ellen unexpectedly receives $5,000 from the IRS, and she decides to donate it to the Helping Hand Charity. The donation is used to make a daycare center for children. Ellen later learns that the $5,000 was a mistake, and the IRS demands the money back. Meanwhile, Paige poses as inanimate objects for Adam's photography.
32	21	"Three Strikes"	Tom Cherones	Pamela Eells & Sally Lapiduss	March 29, 1995	C335	22.7
Ellen joins an animal rights activist group that stages an illegal protest of the killing of ferrets. When Ellen is thrown in jail during the protest, she lands in the custody of her annoying parents, Lois and Harold. After a few days, Ellen can't stand this and borrows her parents car and runs off with Paige and Adam to a rock concert. Afterwards, she is stopped by the police who claims that her parents have reported the car stolen.
33	22	"The Therapy Episode"	Tom Cherones	Story by : Holly Hester; Teleplay by : Mark Driscoll & Holly Hester	May 3, 1995	C336	18.7
Ellen feels guilty about lying to her mother, Lois, of not being able to have lunch with her in order to go on a ski trip with Paige and Adam. So, Ellen visits her therapist, Dr. Whitcomb, who prescribes a dose of total honesty with her parents. But telling the truth proves to be more than the dysfunctional Morgan family bargained for. Meanwhile, Paige decides to take up a new hobby of skydiving, and Adam tries visiting a sperm bank to donate some of his.
34	23	"Thirty Kilo Man (Part 1)"	Tom Cherones	Suzanne Martin	May 10, 1995	C337	17.4
Ellen once again dates Dan, the pizza delivery guy she encouraged to quit delivery to pursue greater ambitions. However, Ellen's mother makes her think Dan is now a drug smuggler, and Ellen flushes flour down the toilet. Meanwhile, Adam becomes hounded by Audrey's jealous policeman ex-boyfriend.
35	24	"Thirty Kilo Man (Part 2)"	Tom Cherones	Maria Semple	May 17, 1995	C338	19.7
Ellen spends so much time with Dan that she neglects to hang out with Paige.
