= Ellen season 5 =

Ellen
- Season 5
- No. of episodes: 22

Release
- Original network: ABC
- Original release: September 24, 1997 – July 22, 1998

Season chronology
- ← Previous; Season 4

The fifth and final season of Ellen, an American television series, began September 24, 1997 and ended on July 22, 1998. It aired on ABC. The region 1 DVD was released on November 28, 2006. Although Disc 2 of the Region 1 DVD release has "The Funeral" before "Womyn Fest", the content of the next two episodes suggests that "Womyn Fest" goes before "The Funeral".

== Cast ==
=== Main cast ===
- Ellen DeGeneres as Ellen Morgan

Only Ellen appeared in all 22 episodes. Though listed as regulars, other cast members were seen on a less frequent basis:

- Joely Fisher as Paige Clark (17 episodes)
- David Anthony Higgins as Joe Farrell (9 episodes)
- Clea Lewis as Audrey Penney (10 episodes)
- Jeremy Piven as Spence Kovak (11 episodes)

== Episodes ==
No. overall	No. in season	Title	Directed by	Written by	Original release date	Prod. code	U.S. viewers (millions)
88	1	"Guys or Dolls"	Gil Junger	Ric Swartzlander	September 24, 1997	C402	11.99
An old boyfriend, Dan, shows up, making Ellen think she might be bisexual. (Dan previously appeared in the season 2 episodes "30-Minute Man" and "30-Kilo Man"). Absent: David Anthony Higgins as Joe Farrell and Clea Lewis as Audrey Penney
89	2	"Social Climber"	Gil Junger	Mike Larsen	October 1, 1997	C401	17.32
Ellen climbs a difficult mountain to impress an athletic woman. Absent: David Anthony Higgins as Joe Farrell and Clea Lewis as Audrey Penney
90	3	"Roommates"	Gail Mancuso	Dan Cohen & F.J. Pratt	October 8, 1997	C403	15.08
Ellen's friends teach her the gay codewords. Absent: David Anthony Higgins as Joe Farrell
91	4	"Gay Yellow Pages"	Gil Junger	Tod Himmel & Lisa K. Nelson	October 15, 1997	C405	15.53
Ellen hires a plumber out of the gay yellow pages.
92	5	"Just Coffee"	Gail Mancuso	Maxine Lapiduss	October 29, 1997	C404	13.36
Ellen meets Laurie Manning, her mortgage banker (Lisa Darr) for coffee.
93	6	"G.I. Ellen"	Gil Junger	Mike Larsen	November 5, 1997	C407	12.61
Ellen plays a soldier in a Civil War re-enactment. Angie Dickinson guest stars. Absent: Joely Fisher as Paige Clark, David Anthony Higgins as Joe Farrell, Clea Lewis as Audrey Penney and Jeremy Piven as Spence Kovak
94	7	"Public Display of Affection"	Gail Mancuso	David Walpert	November 12, 1997	C406	14.78
Ellen has trouble expressing her affection for Laurie in public. Absent: David Anthony Higgins as Joe Farrell and Jeremy Piven as Spence Kovak
95	8	"Emma"	Gail Mancuso	Lawrence Broch	November 19, 1997	C410	13.72
Paige gets Ellen a job as Emma Thompson's personal assistant and Ellen learns Emma's most shocking secret. Absent: David Anthony Higgins as Joe Farrell, Clea Lewis as Audrey Penney and Jeremy Piven as Spence Kovak
96	9	"Like a Virgin"	Gail Mancuso	Jane Espenson	November 26, 1997	C408	11.24
Ellen is anxious about her first time being intimate with a woman. Absent: David Anthony Higgins as Joe Farrell
97	10	"All Ellen, All the Time"	Gil Junger	Ric Swartzlander	December 3, 1997	C409	14.15
Ellen gets a job at a radio station. Absent: Clea Lewis as Audrey Penney and Jeremy Piven As Spence Kovak
98	11	"Break Up"	Gil Junger	Matt Berry	December 17, 1997	C411	12.83
Laurie misunderstands Ellen's 1-month gift as an invitation to move in. Absent: Joely Fisher as Paige Clark
99	12	"Womyn Fest"	Lorraine Sevre-Richmond	Jane Espenson	January 7, 1998	C413	12.86
Ellen, Paige and Audrey go to Womyn Fest (a fictionalized Lilith Fair), where a fortuneteller convinces Audrey that Ellen will meet a new soulmate at the festival and forget about Laurie. Guest appearances by Sarah McLachlan and the Indigo Girls. Absent: David Anthony Higgins as Joe Farrell
100	13	"The Funeral"	Gil Junger	Matt Berry	January 14, 1998	C412	11.83
Now back together, Ellen helps Laurie deal with the death of her father. Absent: Joely Fisher as Paige Clark, Clea Lewis as Audrey Penney and Jeremy Piven as Spence Kovak
101	14	"Escape from L.A."	Gil Junger	Lisa K. Himmel & Tod Nelson	January 28, 1998	C415	11.02
Ellen and Laurie go on vacation, but Laurie is annoyed that Ellen won't follow the vacation itinerary. The two of them hang out with an interracial straight couple. Absent: Joely Fisher as Paige Clark, David Anthony Higgins as Joe Farrell, Clea Lewis as Audrey Penney and Jeremy Piven as Spence Kovak
102	15	"Ellen in Focus"	Gil Junger	Leif Sandaas	February 11, 1998	C417	10.27
Paige gets Ellen on a focus group so Ellen can convince the others that Paige's idea for a TV show featuring a tall cop and a short cop is a good idea. Absent: Clea Lewis as Audrey Penney and Jeremy Piven as Spence Kovak
103	16	"Neighbors"	Gail Mancuso	Story by : Kit Pongetti; Teleplay by : Cynthia Greenburg & Charmaine Noel Dixon	February 18, 1998	C416	8.49
Ellen gets off on the wrong foot with her new neighbors, the Patels, an immigrant couple from India, when a variety of circumstances conspire to make Ellen look like a fool in front of them. Absent: David Anthony Higgins as Joe Farrell, Clea Lewis as Audrey Penney and Jeremy Piven as Spence Kovak
104	17	"It's a Gay, Gay, Gay, Gay World!"	Gil Junger	David Walpert	February 25, 1998	C414	9.58
After an accident, Spence imagines a parallel Earth in which gays are the norm. Spence rejects Joe's advances because he's straight.
105	18	"Hospital"	Gail Mancuso	Matt Berry & Ric Swartzlander	March 4, 1998	C419	12.32
Ellen goes to the hospital after getting the news Laurie was in an accident. There, she meets Laurie's ex, Karen (Anne Heche). Absent: Joely Fisher as Paige Clark, David Anthony Higgins as Joe Farrell, Clea Lewis as Audrey Penney and Jeremy Piven as Spence Kovak
106	19	"Ellen: A Hollywood Tribute"	Gil Junger	Tim Doyle	May 13, 1998	C421	9.91
107	20	"Ellen: A Hollywood Tribute"	Gil Junger	Tim Doyle	May 13, 1998	C422	9.91
A mockumentary traces Ellen's career from her days in vaudeville to the present. Guest stars include Cindy Crawford & Helen Hunt as auditionees for the role of Ellen and Woody Harrelson as Ellen's husband. Guest starring as themselves are Phil Donahue, Jennifer Aniston, Ted Danson, Mary Steenburgen, Kathy Najimy & Bea Arthur.
108	21	"When Ellen Talks, People Listen"	Gil Junger	Mike Larsen	July 15, 1998	C420	6.34
On her talk show, Ellen suggests that everyone should reach out to their neighbors with a helping hand. This winds up having negative consequences. Absent: David Anthony Higgins as Joe Farrell, Clea Lewis as Audrey Penney and Jeremy Piven as Spence Kovak
109	22	"Vows"	Lorraine Sevre-Richmond	F.J. Pratt & Dan Cohen	July 22, 1998	C418	5.58
Ellen's parents renew their vows in a special ceremony. Ellen asks Laurie to marry her but Laurie is reluctant. Absent: David Anthony Higgins as Joe Farrell, Clea Lewis as Audrey Penney and Jeremy Piven as Spence Kovak
