= List of awards and nominations received by Ellen =

Ellen is an American television sitcom that was broadcast on ABC from March 29, 1994, until July 22, 1998. The series was created by Neal Marlens, Carol Black and David S. Rosenthal. It was originally titled These Friends of Mine, but it was changed after the first season to avoid confusion with the NBC series Friends. Ellen stars stand-up comedian Ellen DeGeneres as Ellen Morgan, a Los Angeles bookstore owner in her thirties. The series centers on Ellen's daily life, her friends and her family.

== Awards and nominations ==
=== Artios Awards ===
The Artios Awards have been annually presented by the Casting Society of America (CSA) since 1985. The awards recognise excellence in theatrical, film, and television casting.

Year	Category	Nominee	Result	Ref.
1995	Best Comedy Episodic Casting	Tammara Billik and Justine Jacoby	Nominated	
1997	Best Comedy Episodic Casting	Tammara Billik	Nominated	
1998	Best Comedy Episodic Casting	Tammara Billik	Won	

=== American Comedy Awards ===
Year	Category	Nominee	Result	Ref.
1995	Funniest Female Performer in a TV Series (Leading Role) – Network, Cable or Syndication	Ellen DeGeneres	Nominated	
1998	Funniest Female Performer in a TV Series (Leading Role) – Network, Cable or Syndication	Ellen DeGeneres	Nominated	
1998	Funniest Female Guest Appearance in a TV Series	Laura Dern	Nominated	
1998	Funniest Female Guest Appearance in a TV Series	Emma Thompson	Nominated	
1999	Funniest Female Performer in a TV Series (Leading Role) – Network, Cable or Syndication	Ellen DeGeneres	Nominated	

=== BMI Film & TV Awards ===
Year	Category	Nominee	Result	Ref.
1995	TV Music Award	W. G. Snuffy Walden	Won	

=== Directors Guild of America ===
Year	Category	Nominee	Result	Ref.
1997	Outstanding Directing in a Comedy Series	Gil Junger for "The Puppy Episode"	Nominated	

=== GLAAD Media Awards ===
Year	Category	Nominee	Result	Ref.
1997	Outstanding Comedy Series	Ellen	Nominated	
1998	Outstanding Comedy Series	Ellen	Won	
1999	Outstanding Comedy Series	Ellen	Nominated	

=== Golden Globe Awards ===
Year	Category	Nominee	Result	Ref.
1995	Best Actress in a Television Series – Musical or Comedy	Ellen DeGeneres	Nominated	
1996	Best Actress in a Television Series – Musical or Comedy	Ellen DeGeneres	Nominated	
1998	Best Actress in a Television Series – Musical or Comedy	Ellen DeGeneres	Nominated	
1998	Best Supporting Actress in a Series, Miniseries or Television Film	Joely Fisher	Nominated	

=== Primetime Emmy Awards ===
Year	Category	Nominee	Result	Ref.
1995	Outstanding Lead Actress in a Comedy Series	Ellen DeGeneres for "The Spa"	Nominated	
1996	Outstanding Lead Actress in a Comedy Series	Ellen DeGeneres for "Witness"	Nominated	
1997	Outstanding Directing for a Comedy Series	Gil Junger for "The Puppy Episode"	Nominated	
1997	Outstanding Guest Actress in a Comedy Series	Laura Dern for "The Puppy Episode"	Nominated	
1997	Outstanding Lead Actress in a Comedy Series	Ellen DeGeneres for "The Puppy Episode"	Nominated	
1997	Outstanding Multi-Camera Picture Editing for a Comedy Series	Kris Trexler for "The Puppy Episode"	Won	
1997	Outstanding Writing for a Comedy Series	Ellen DeGeneres, Mark Driscoll, Dava Savel, Tracy Newman, Jonathan Stark for "The Puppy Episode"	Won	
1998	Outstanding Guest Actress in a Comedy Series	Emma Thompson for "Emma"	Won	
1998	Outstanding Lead Actress in a Comedy Series	Ellen DeGeneres for "Neighbors"	Nominated	
1998	Outstanding Writing for a Comedy Series	Lawrence Broch for "Emma"	Nominated	

=== Satellite Awards ===
Year	Category	Nominee	Result	Ref.
1997	Best Actress in a Television Series Musical or Comedy	Ellen DeGeneres	Nominated	
1998	Best Actress in a Television Series Musical or Comedy	Ellen DeGeneres	Won	
1998	Best Television Series – Musical or Comedy	Ellen	Won	

=== Screen Actors Guild ===
Year	Category	Nominee	Result	Ref.
1994	Outstanding Performance by a Female Actor in a Comedy Series	Ellen DeGeneres	Nominated	
1996	Outstanding Performance by a Female Actor in a Comedy Series	Ellen DeGeneres	Nominated	
1997	Outstanding Performance by a Female Actor in a Comedy Series	Ellen DeGeneres	Nominated	

=== Writers Guild of America Awards ===
Year	Category	Nominee	Result	Ref.
1997	Best Episodic Comedy	Mark Driscoll, Dava Savel, Tracy Newman, Jonathan Stark, Ellen DeGeneres for "The Puppy Episode"	Nominated	
1998	Best Episodic Comedy	Lawrence Broch for "Emma"	Nominated	
