= Maggie Wheeler =

American actress

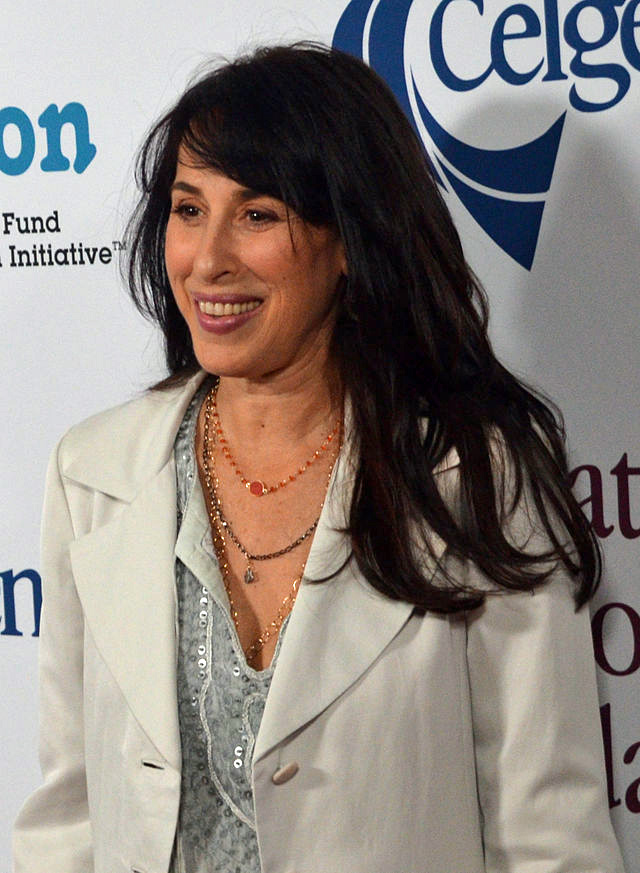
- Wheeler in 2013
- Occupation: Actress
- Years active: 1982–present
- Spouse: Daniel Wheeler (m. 1990)
- Children: 2
- Mother: Barbara Jakobson

Maggie Wheeler (née Jakobson) is an American actress. She is best known for her role as Janice on the television sitcom Friends (1994–2004), and Anita on Ellen (1994–1996). In addition to her acting and voiceover work, she is a singer, songwriter, choir director, and workshop facilitator.

== Early life and education ==
Wheeler is the daughter of Barbara Jakobson, an art collector, and John Jakobson, a member of the New York Stock Exchange. She was raised in a secular Jewish household and graduated from The Calhoun School in New York City.

== Career ==
In the 1980s, Wheeler (under her maiden name of Jakobson) briefly dabbled in voice acting. In the animated series SilverHawks, she voiced not only the villainess Melodia and the heroine Steelheart/Emily Hart, but all of the female characters; she also worked on the Karate Kat and Mini-Monsters segments of The Comic Strip. In 1989 she appeared in the live-action film, New Year's Day, alongside David Duchovny.

After she became Maggie Wheeler, it was rumored that she auditioned for the role of Monica Geller in Friends. She denied this in an interview, stating that she only auditioned for the role of Janice Goralnik, which she was invited to play. Janice was a recurring character of the series and particularly known as a frequent love interest of main character Chandler Bing. She featured in 19 episodes, appearing at least once in each season.

She also auditioned for the role of Debra Barone, on the American sitcom Everybody Loves Raymond. Although she was the producers' choice, CBS ended up selecting Patricia Heaton. Instead, Wheeler played the recurring role of Debra's friend, Linda.

According to Kathy Griffin's autobiography, Official Book Club Selection, Wheeler was cast in the role of Vicki for the pilot episode of Suddenly Susan and was later replaced by Griffin.

She had a star billing in the first season of Ellen. She appeared on the hit comedy Seinfeld in the episode "The Fix-Up", as one of Elaine's friends who is set up with George. She has appeared in many other television programs, including Drake & Josh, ER, The X-Files, The War at Home, Will & Grace, Jack and Jill, How I Met Your Mother and Curb Your Enthusiasm.

In 1997, Wheeler voiced Harley Quinn's replacement in the Batman: The Animated Series episode "Joker's Millions".

In 1998, she appeared in the remake of Disney's The Parent Trap, playing the younger of a mother-daughter pair of camp counselors. Wheeler provided the voice of Odile in Barbie of Swan Lake, and Trinette in the animated sitcom Archer.

In 2011, she guest-starred in the Disney Channel series Shake It Up as Dina's mother.

Wheeler is the co-founder and director of the Golden Bridge Community Choir in Hollywood, a non-auditioned, intergenerational choir which supports local and global communities through fundraising concerts. She travels to retreat centers, universities, communities and schools to teach vocal workshops.

== Personal life ==
She has been married to sculptor Daniel Borden Wheeler since 1990. They have two daughters.

== Filmography ==
=== Film ===
Year	Title	Role	Notes
1982	Soup for One	Nurse	
1983	Portfolio	Assistant Choreographer	
1987	Someone to Love	Attendee	
1989	Mortal Sins	Marie	
1989	New Year's Day	Lucy	
1993	Sexual Healing	Suzanne	Short film
1998	The Parent Trap	Marva Kulp Jr.	
2003	Barbie of Swan Lake	Odile (voice)	Direct-to-video film
2006	Dr. Dolittle 3	Brown Hen (voice)	Direct-to-video film
2006	Dr. Dolittle 3	Fluffy Hen (voice)	Direct-to-video film
2007	Waking Dreams	Jenny	
2015	The 3 Tails: A Mermaid Adventure	Maria	
2019	The Addams Family	Trudy Pickering (voice)	
2021	Mark, Mary & Some Other People	Lisa	
2025	Dog Man	Nurse (voice)	

=== Television ===
Year	Title	Role	Notes
1984	The New Show	Various	8 episodes
1985	The Paper Chase	N/A	Episode: "The Day Kingsfield Missed Class"
1986	SilverHawks	Melodia/Steelheart	Voice, main role
1990	L.A. Law	Paula Lights	Episode: "The Good Human Bar"
1991	Dream On	Bonnie Decker	Episode: "So Funny I Forgot to Laugh"
1992	Seinfeld	Cynthia	Episode: "The Fix-Up"
1992	Civil Wars	Patricia McDermott	Episode: "Mob Psychology"
1992	Doogie Howser, M.D.	Dr. Elena Spencer	2 episodes
1994	The X-Files	Det. Sharon Lazard	Episode: "Born Again"
1994–2004	Friends	Janice Litman-Goralnik	Recurring role
1994–1996	Ellen	Anita Warrell	Main role (season 1); guest role (season 3)
1995	Pride & Joy	Flight Attendant	Episode: "Terror at 30,000 Feet"
1996–2004	Everybody Loves Raymond	Linda Gruenfelder	Recurring role (season 1, 4, 7–8); guest role (season 2)
1998	The New Batman Adventures	Fake Harley Quinn (voice)	Episode: "Joker's Millions"
1998	Love Boat: The Next Wave	Cindy	Episode: "True Course"
1999	Get Real	Jennifer	Episode: "Pilot"
2001	Jack & Jill	Kristen Moss	2 episodes
2001	It's Like, You Know...	Rachel	Episode: "Walking Tall"
2002	Will & Grace	Polly	Episode: "Dying Is Easy, Comedy Is Hard"
2002	Justice League	Antiope (voice)	Episode: "Fury"
2003	CSI: Crime Scene Investigation	Stand-Up Comedian	Episode: "Last Laugh"
2004	Kim Possible	Dr. Renton (voice)	Episode: "Motor Ed"
2005	Paine Management	Jeanine Bernsen	Television film
2005	Fat Actress	Woman Diapering Baby	Episode: "Charlie's Angels or Too Pooped to Pop"
2005	Higglytown Heroes	Street Sweeper Hero (voice)	Episode: "Higgly Frog Day"
2005	E-Ring	Investigator	Episode: "Escape and Evade"
2006	Drake & Josh	Denise	Episode: "Alien Invasion"
2006	ER	Amy Kellerman	Episode: "Ames v. Kovac"
2006	Friday Night Lights	Teacher	Episode: "It's Different for Girls"
2007	The War at Home	Mindy	2 episodes
2007	How I Met Your Mother	Margaret	Episode: "Dowisetrepla"
2009	Without a Trace	Gail Menken	Episode: "Wanted"
2009	The Breakdown	Jennifer	Unsold television pilot
2009–2012, 2017, 2022	Archer	Trinette McGoon (voice)	12 episodes
2010	Glenn Martin DDS	N/A (voice)	Episode: "Jackie of All Trades"
2011	Shake It Up	Mrs Garcia	2 episodes
2011	Curb Your Enthusiasm	Ilene Solotaroff	Episode: "Palestinian Chicken"
2011	The Closer	Gail's friend	Episode: "Road Block"
2013	Californication	Ophelia Robbins	5 episodes
2013	Perception	Barbara Bruckner	Episode: "Alienation"
2014	Hot in Cleveland	Rachel	Episode: "Murder House"
2014	Teenage Mutant Ninja Turtles	Small Town Reporter (voice)	Episode: "Race with the Demon"
2015	I Didn't Do It	Fortune Teller	Episode: "The Bite Club"
2016	Maron	Steph	Episode: "Shrink and Kink"
2018	Shameless	Fiona's Lawyer	2 episodes
2018	The Epic Tales of Captain Underpants	Lunch Lady (voice)	2 episodes
2018	The Epic Tales of Captain Underpants	Mrs. Yewh (voice)	2 episodes
2021	Friends: The Reunion	Herself	Television special
2024	Bob’s Burgers	Shirley	Episode: “The Lost City of Atlantic”
