= The Geena Davis Show =

American sitcom television series

- Genre: Sitcom
- Created by: Terri Minsky
- Starring: Geena Davis; Peter Horton; Mimi Rogers; Kim Coles; John Francis Daley; Makenzie Vega; Esther Scott; Harland Williams
- Composers: Jonathan Wolff; Becky Kneubuhl
- Country of origin: United States Japan
- Original language: English
- No. of seasons: 1
- No. of episodes: 22

Production
- Executive producers: Terri Minsky; David Flebotte; Nina Wass; Eugene Stein
- Producer: Genna Davis
- Camera setup: Multi-camera
- Running time: 30 minutes
- Production companies: Wass/Stein Productions; Touchstone Television

Original release
- Network: ABC
- Release: October 10, 2000 – July 10, 2001

The Geena Davis Show is an American sitcom television series created by Terri Minsky starring Geena Davis. The show aired for one season on ABC from October 10, 2000, to July 10, 2001, during the 2000–01 U.S. television season.

== Plot ==
Sexy, sophisticated, and dim-witted Manhattan party-planner Teddie Cochran starts dating writer Max Ryan. The two hit it off, and Teddie soon moves into Max's suburban home along with his two children, six-year-old Eliza and 13-year-old Carter. Motherless for some time (Max is a widower), the two are not exactly welcoming of Teddie. Along with her two best friends Hilary and Judy, Teddie must use her unique blend of wits, sarcasm, and enthusiasm to get through her new lifestyle.

== Cast ==
=== Main ===
- Geena Davis – Teddie Cochran
- Peter Horton – Max Ryan
- Mimi Rogers – Hillary
- Kim Coles – Judy
- John Francis Daley – Carter Ryan
- Makenzie Vega – Eliza Ryan
- Esther Scott – Gladys Guevara
- Harland Williams – Alan

=== Supporting ===
- Katey Sagal – Ashley
- Peggy Jo Jacobs as Patrice
- Lise Simms as Natalie
- Steve Valentine as Walter
- Susan Wood as Sydney
- Sarah Zinsser as Mrs. Toll
- Adeline Allen as Morgan
- Dylan Capannelli as Justin
- Graham Norton as Bryan Fernando

== Production and development ==
Terri Minsky first pitched the idea of a Sex and the City-like character becoming a suburban housewife to ABC in early 2000. After some debating, ABC decided to make the show less like Sex and the City and more tailored to its star, Geena Davis. The show was filmed in Los Angeles and premiered on ABC on Tuesday, October 10, 2000, at 9:30 pm. The show lasted less than a season before being replaced by the Joan Cusack sitcom What About Joan?

Davis appeared on the cover of TV Guide's 2000 Fall Preview issue, along with three other actors starring in new sitcoms: Bette Midler, Michael Richards and John Goodman. Despite the magazine declaring them a "fab foursome," all four series bombed, with Davis' show actually airing the most episodes (20), compared to Bette (16), The Michael Richards Show (eight) and Goodman's Normal, Ohio (seven).

== Episodes ==
No.	Title	Directed by	Written by	Original release date	Prod. code	U.S. viewers (millions)
1	"Pilot"	Andy Cadiff	Terri Minsky	October 10, 2000	529N	17.30
Following a whirlwind romance, Teddie and Max get engaged, but she has difficulties ingratiating herself to his kids.
2	"What I Like About You"	Andy Cadiff	David Flebotte	October 17, 2000	L516	13.06
Teddie has to choose between taking a meeting with Hillary Clinton or attending Carter's school art fair.
3	"Piece of Cake"	Andy Cadiff	Tracy Gamble	October 24, 2000	L512	7.85
Teddie attempts to juggle her career, friendships, and her newfound motherly duties, but she winds up with an annoyed client, a disgruntled bestie, and an unintentionally erotic cake.
4	"Jealousy"	Andy Cadiff	Dawn DeKeyser	October 31, 2000	L513	10.34
While enjoying a night out with Max and her girlfriends, Teddie runs into her ex (Maurice Godin). She's appalled that Max isn't jealous, and she herself becomes overwrought with jealousy when she learns that he had a fling with a woman who sometimes babysits the kids.
5	"Motherly Advice"	Andy Cadiff	Bill Daly	November 14, 2000	L517	10.69
Teddie gives Carter some advice about girls which horrendously backfires and finds him accused of sexual harassment.
6	"There's Something About Max"	Andy Cadiff	Dawn DeKeyser	November 21, 2000	L519	10.68
Teddie and Max spontaneously decide to take a dance class, which leads to a quarrel due to Max's lack of dance skills.
7	"Cooties"	Andy Cadiff	Terri Minsky	November 28, 2000	L518	11.23
When Teddie throws an extravagant birthday party for Eliza, she's targeted for scrutiny by a pack of mean moms.
8	"The Long Kiss Goodbye"	Andy Cadiff	Jill Condon & Amy Toomin	December 5, 2000	L514	10.69
Teddie freaks out after Max's college roommate gives her an uncomfortable goodbye kiss. Meanwhile, Hillary and Judy feel uneasy about Teddie's decision to make Doris one of her bridesmaids.
9	"By Teddie Cochran"	Andy Cadiff	Tracy Gamble	December 12, 2000	L520	10.76
Max hopes to land a job at a prestigious magazine, but Teddie's the one who's asked to author an article.
10	"How the Mom Stole Christmas"	Andy Cadiff	Jonathan Goldstein	December 19, 2000	L521	12.91
In a parody of Dr. Seuss How The Grinch Stole Christmas, Teddie's Christmas plans are shattered when she discovers Max has invited her mother (Cynthia Harris) for the holidays.
11	"Momma Bear"	Andy Cadiff	Bill Daly	January 9, 2001	L523	10.36
Teddie becomes protective of Carter when he brings home a disobeying older girl.
12	"Car Wash"	Andy Cadiff	Terri Minsky & Jim Vallely	January 16, 2001	L522	9.54
When Eliza loses the role that she wants in the school play, Teddie promises her a role in a TV commercial.
13	"Max Hates Hillary"	Andy Cadiff	Jim Vallely & Judy Toll	January 23, 2001	L515	9.73
Teddie tries to trick Max and Hillary into liking one another.
14	"There's a New Bride in Town"	Andy Cadiff	Jill Condon & Amy Toomin	January 30, 2001	L525	8.81
Teddie feels threatened when Judy has her own whirlwind romance.
15	"Photo Finish"	Andy Cadiff	Terri Minsky & Jim Vallely	February 6, 2001	L526	9.64
Teddie's racy photos for Esquire are the talk of the town when Max's repressed parents (Anne Haney & Paul Dooley) arrive for a surprise visit.
16	"Sex, Lies, and Videotape"	Andy Cadiff	Jonathan Goldstein	February 13, 2001	L524	10.00
After Carter is punished for getting drunk and breaking curfew, he discovers college home movies of his father stoned. Note: Teddie Cochran talks in a manner similar to Hugo the Abominable Snowman from Warner Bros. Looney Tunes after talking about naming every pet "George" and a fondness for bunny rabbits.
17	"Hot Potato"	Andy Cadiff	Mark Driscoll	February 20, 2001	L528	9.61
Carter gets a job at Korndog King (a parody of Burger King) and gives away food to the popular kids; Teddie adopts a psychotic cat.
18	"The Prime Directive"	Andy Cadiff	Marc Abrams & Michael Benson	March 6, 2001	L529	8.69
Teddie takes Carter to a party where her famous friends inflate his ego.
19	"Spontaneous Combustion"	Andy Cadiff	John Levenstein	March 13, 2001	L511	9.19
Teddie decides to sublet her apartment, but she has second thoughts after realizing she and Max can use the pad to have uninhibited sex.
20	"The Wedding"	Mark Cendrowski	Terri Minsky & Jim Vallely	June 12, 2001	L531	7.04
To appease Eliza, Teddie decides to forget her dream wedding and run down to city hall to marry Max, but a variety of complications ensue.
21	"Girls' Night Out"	Andy Cadiff	Tracy Gamble	July 3, 2001	L527	5.99
Teddie's bachelorette party takes an unexpected turn when she's reunited with her former best friend (Katey Sagal).
22	"White Moms Can't Jump"	Andy Cadiff	Bill Daly	July 10, 2001	L530	6.48
Teddie embarrasses Carter during a basketball game.

== International broadcasts ==
In Italy, The Geena Davis Show (known as Geena Davis Show) aired on RaiDue Car Hire in 2005.

The Geena Davis Show was screened in the United Kingdom on the now-defunct channel ABC1, from the channel's beginning in 2004 until its closure in 2007. The entire series was broadcast on the channel.
