= Andy Barker, P.I. =

American detective sitcom

- Genre: Sitcom
- Created by: Conan O'Brien; Jonathan Groff
- Starring: Andy Richter; Clea Lewis; Harve Presnell; Tony Hale; Marshall Manesh
- Composer: Adam Cohen
- Country of origin: United States
- Original language: English
- No. of seasons: 1
- No. of episodes: 6

Production
- Executive producers: Conan O'Brien; Jonathan Groff; Andy Kissinger; Jeff Ross
- Camera setup: Single-camera
- Running time: 30 minutes
- Production companies: Red Pulley Productions; Conaco; NBC Universal Television Studio

Original release
- Network: NBC
- Release: March 15 – April 14, 2007

Andy Barker, P.I. is an American detective sitcom television series starring Andy Richter produced and broadcast by NBC, and co-starring Tony Hale, Marshall Manesh, Harve Presnell, and Clea Lewis.

Richter plays Andy Barker, a certified public accountant who reluctantly becomes a private investigator after he is mistaken for the former office tenant, a private eye, now retired. Andy develops a taste for solving cases, assisted by the former P.I., a film buff owner of the downstairs video store, a surveillance-expert restaurateur, and as time goes on, his wife.

The show was produced for one season, and was scheduled to run a six-episode, five-week course starting Thursday, March 15, 2007, on NBC. However, the series was cancelled and removed from the Thursday lineup after the fourth episode aired. The final two episodes aired on Saturday, April 14.

== Development and production ==
On March 7, 2006, NBC announced the ordering of the pilot episode, which was written by creators and executive producers Conan O'Brien and Jonathan Groff. The series is shot single-camera, and is presented without a laugh track. In early March 2007, NBC published all six episodes of Andy Barker, P.I. on the NBC website prior to its broadcast premiere.

NBC premiered Andy Barker, P.I. with another detective-themed show, Raines. Both shows, available on the iTunes Store, offered free downloads of the pilots for a short time.

The show is set in the fictional Los Angeles neighborhood of "Fair Oaks, California". The real Fair Oaks, California, is near Sacramento.

== Cast ==
Cast of Andy Barker, P.I.

Early promotional images released to promote the series feature the early cast set for the show — Andy, Simon, Lew, Wally, Ruth, and Jessica. The roles of Ruth (Andy's wife) and Jessica (Andy's "assistant") were later renamed and recast before the show's debut. Ruth Barker, later renamed Jenny Barker (performed by Clea Lewis), was portrayed by Amy Farrington. Jessica, later renamed and reworked into Nicole (performed by Nicole Randall Johnson), was portrayed by Ion Overman in these images. These roles were presumably recast after the early photo shoot and prior to the filming and further development of the series as Farrington and Overman were not seen in the series itself.

=== Cast ===
- Andy Richter as Andrew "Andy" Barker: A middle-aged certified public accountant, who after starting his own firm in the pilot, he reluctantly takes on a missing-person case brought to him by a mysterious Russian-accented woman who mistakes Andy for the former tenant, a real P.I. In subsequent episodes, Andy takes on (or is thrust into) cases that usually involve his friends and family and which he must solve in addition to his accounting duties.
- Clea Lewis as Jenny Barker: Andy's wife, she first disapproves, but gradually warms to his new side profession. Andy and she have an infant daughter named Molly and at least one son. Andy mentions that his son went through a unicorn phase in "Dial M for Laptop."
- Harve Presnell as Lew Staziak: The retired tough-as-nails cynical P.I. and prior tenant of Andy's rental office, Lew becomes Andy's mentor and aide, with mixed consequences. Lew antagonizes Simon, suffers from alektorophobia (fear of chickens), and his memory lapses cause trouble for Andy. Mickey Doyle, Lew's unscrupulous former partner, was the villain of the episode "The Lady Varnishes."
- Tony Hale as Simon: Manager of the "Video Riot" rental store, he has extensive knowledge of movie trivia. He befriends Andy, and designates himself an investigative partner.
- Marshall Manesh as Wally: An Afghan restaurant owner, he "went overboard with patriotism after 9/11," and has excellent surveillance equipment.

=== Notable guest stars ===
- Nicole Randall Johnson as Nicole: An unmotivated file clerk with an attitude who appears in the pilot episode. However, after Andy costs her the clerk job by stealing files, she matter-of-factly hires herself as his unwanted assistant in "Fairway My Lovely". Simon is infatuated with her, but she ignores his advances. She has a deaf brother and is fluent in reading lips. Nicole is heavily featured in promotions, but is a supporting character in just two episodes.
- Vanessa Branch as Nadia Kerensky ("Pilot")
- Gary Anthony Williams as Ron ("Pilot")
- Traci Lords as Loretta Crispin ("Dial M For Laptop")
- Sarah Christine Smith as Alicia ("The Big No Sleep")
- Amy Sedaris as Rita Spaulding ("The Lady Varnishes")
- Edward Asner as Mickey Doyle ("The Lady Varnishes")
- James Hong as Jon Leibowitz ("The Lady Varnishes")
- Peter Allen Vogt as Guy Helverson ("Fairway, My Lovely")
- Jesse L. Martin as his Law & Order character Detective Ed Green ("The Big No Sleep")
- Nestor Carbonell as Dr. Cey ("The Big No Sleep")

== Episodes ==
After the pilot, the titles of all the episodes are plays on the titles of actual classic mystery and private-investigator films. The title "Fairway, My Lovely" is based on Farewell, My Lovely; "Three Days of the Chicken" is based on Three Days of the Condor; "Dial M for Laptop" is based on Dial M for Murder; "The Big No Sleep" is based on The Big Sleep; and "The Lady Varnishes" is based on The Lady Vanishes.

No.	Title	Directed by	Written by	Original release date	Prod. code
1	"Pilot"	Jason Ensler	Conan O'Brien & Jonathan Groff	March 15, 2007	101
Mild-mannered accountant Andy Barker begins a double life as a P.I. when he is hired to solve a case involving the Russian mafia.
2	"Fairway, My Lovely"	Jason Ensler	Jane Espenson & Alex Herschlag	March 22, 2007	104
After Guy Helverson, an overweight tax client, dies, seemingly of natural causes, his wife insists that he was murdered. Andy is doubtful until he discovers that Guy was having an affair.
3	"Three Days of the Chicken"	Jason Ensler	Gail Lerner	March 29, 2007	103
Wally is blackmailed by Transcor, an evil chicken cartel that murders anyone who gets in their way. Andy is determined to stop them, but Lew warns that Transcor is too powerful.
4	"Dial M for Laptop"	Jason Ensler	Chuck Tatham	April 5, 2007	102
Andy gets caught up in a credit-fraud case while trying to simultaneously file his father-in-law's taxes.
5	"The Big No Sleep"	Jason Ensler	Josh Bycel	April 14, 2007	106
A dishonest doctor pains Andy, until a baby toy provides the clues Andy needed.
6	"The Lady Varnishes"	Jason Ensler	Jon Ross	April 14, 2007	105
Series finale: Andy discovers a 40-year-old letter from a woman convicted of murder that explains she was framed. However, Lew's former partner, the real murderer, stops at nothing to keep the truth from coming out.

- Note: the final two episodes were aired on a Saturday at a special time of 8:00 and 8:30.

== Home media ==
Shout! Factory released Andy Barker, P.I.: The Complete Series on DVD on November 17, 2009.

== Reception ==
Critic reviews were positive in the L.A. Times ("quietly delightful"), Entertainment Weekly (B+), and a 73% score based on 24 critic reviews at Metacritic. Some reviewers were reserved: Chicago Tribune ("some laughs, but the show fails to truly catch fire").

== U.S. television ratings ==
Weekly rankings based on Fast National ratings.

#	Episode	Air Date	Timeslot (EST)	Season	Rating	Share	18–49	Viewers	Rank
1	"Pilot"	March 15, 2007	Thursday 9:30PM	2006–2007	3.7	6	2.4/6	6.0	# 63
2	"Fairway, My Lovely"	March 22, 2007	Thursday 9:30PM	2006–2007	3.5	5	2.2/5	5.3	# 72
3	"Three Days of the Chicken"	March 29, 2007	Thursday 9:30PM	2006–2007	2.6	4	2.1/5	4.2	# 92
4	"Dial M for Laptop"	April 5, 2007	Thursday 9:30PM	2006–2007	2.6	4	1.7/5	4.1	# 95
5	"The Big No Sleep"	April 14, 2007	Saturday 8:00PM	2006–2007	1.6	3	0.5/2	2.1	TBA
6	"The Lady Varnishes"	April 14, 2007	Saturday 8:30PM	2006–2007	1.3	3	0.6/2	2.0	TBA

Season	Timeslot (EDT)	Series Premiere	Series Finale	TV Season	Rank	Viewers (in millions)
1 (see above)	Thursday 9:30 P.M. (March 15, 2007 – April 5, 2007) Saturday 8:00 P.M. (April 14, 2007) Saturday 8:30 P.M. (April 14, 2007)	March 15, 2007	April 14, 2007	2006–2007	#93	5.4
