= Barbara Jakobson =

American art collector (1933–2025)

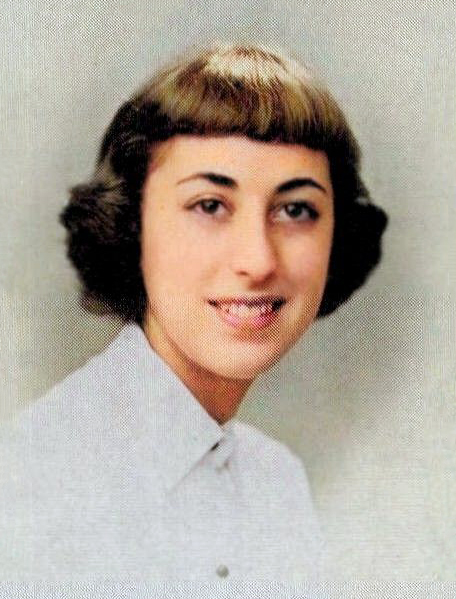
- Jakobson in 1950
- Born: Barbara Joan Petchesky; January 31, 1933; New York City, U.S.
- Died: August 25, 2025 (aged 92); New York City, U.S.
- Education: Smith College
- Organization: Museum of Modern Art (1960s–2025)
- Spouse: John Jakobson (m. 1950; div. 1983)
- Children: 3, including Maggie Wheeler (Note: One deceased)

Barbara Joan Jakobson (née Petchesky; January 31, 1933 – August 25, 2025) was an American art collector. She was a trustee of the Museum of Modern Art (MoMA) from 1974 until her death in 2025.

== Early life and education ==
Born on January 31, 1933, in Brooklyn, New York, Barbara Joan Petchesky was the daughter of Rose (Parnes) Petchesky and Joseph Petchesky. She grew up on Eastern Parkway, "across the street from the Brooklyn Museum". According to Jakobson, both of her parents were born in the United States and "came from very solid Brooklyn families". She stated that her ancestors "only wanted to be Americans" and did not talk about where they were from, though she said she "knew they were from Russia, probably somewhere near the Polish–Russian border". Her mother introduced her to art collecting, being herself interested in collecting furniture and art. For the first eight grades, Jakobson attended public school. She then attended Packer Collegiate Institute, an all-girls private school. She also attended Red Wing, an all-girls summer camp. She attended Smith College from 1950 to 1954, where she studied art and architectural history.

== Career ==
In the 1960s, she joined the Junior Council at the MoMA. While on the Junior Council, Jakobson became a founding member of the Studio Museum in Harlem, which opened in 1968. She later became head of the Junior Council in 1971, and was elected as a MoMA board member in 1974. While on the Junior Council, she organized "a show of architectural drawings that included works by Peter Eisenman, Raimund Abraham, and Gaetano Pesce".

She had close friendships with some of New York's top art dealers, including Sidney Janis, Ileana Sonnabend, and Leo Castelli. Jakobson notably persuaded Castelli to donate Robert Rauschenberg's Bed (1955), to the MoMA, where it is now a part of its permanent collection. Bed was originally purchased by Castelli for $1,200; however, when he offered it to MoMA, the piece was valued at $10 million. She was also part of the committee that selected Yoshio Taniguchi to serve as the architect for MoMA's $850 million expansion, which opened in 2004.

== Personal life and death ==
She married John Jakobson while she was a junior in college and he attended Harvard Business School. The couple had three children, whom they raised in a secular Jewish household. The couple divorced in 1983. One of their children, Maggie, is an actress. Another of their children, John Paul, died in 2004.

Jakobson lived in the same townhouse on the Upper East Side from 1965 until at least 2021. In 2005, Jakobson sold 41 works from her personal collection at a Christie's auction. Among them were works by Carlo Mollino, Josef Albers, Diane Arbus and Frank Stella. In 2006, she commissioned Tom Sachs to install a bar in her apartment. She also installed a stair lift in her townhouse after suffering a fall on her stairs that caused a broken leg.

Jakobson died from pneumonia at a hospital in Manhattan, on August 25, 2025, at the age of 92. A February 2026 Christie's auction of items from her collection grossed $11 million, including $7.6M for Jeff Koons' Winter Bears.
