= I'm Dying Up Here =

- Genre: Comedy drama
- Created by: Dave Flebotte
- Based on: I'm Dying Up Here by William Knoedelseder
- Starring: Melissa Leo; Ari Graynor; Clark Duke; Michael Angarano; Andrew Santino; Stephen Guarino; Erik Griffin; RJ Cyler; Al Madrigal; Jake Lacy
- Country of origin: United States
- Original language: English
- No. of seasons: 2
- No. of episodes: 20

Production
- Executive producers: Michael Aguilar; Jim Carrey; Dave Flebotte; Christina Wayne
- Producer: Jeff Shakoor
- Running time: 60 minutes
- Production companies: Some Kind of Garden; Assembly Entertainment; Endemol Shine North America; Plymouth Street Productions; Showtime Networks

Original release
- Network: Showtime
- Release: June 4, 2017 – July 8, 2018

I'm Dying Up Here is an American comedy-drama television series created by Dave Flebotte. The pilot was written by Flebotte and directed by Jonathan Levine. It premiered on Showtime on June 4, 2017. The series is executive produced by Flebotte, Jim Carrey, Michael Aguilar, and Christina Wayne. It was announced on January 12, 2016, that Showtime had ordered the pilot to series based on the bestselling nonfiction book by William Knoedelseder of the same title. On September 8, 2017, Showtime renewed the series for a 10-episode second season. The second season premiered on May 6, 2018. On September 28, 2018, Showtime announced that it had canceled the series.

== Premise ==
I'm Dying Up Here explores the Los Angeles stand-up scene circa 1973 as a group of young comedians attempt to become successful at Goldie's comedy club and potentially gain a star-making turn on Johnny Carson's Tonight Show. Club owner Goldie mentors the young comics with a combination of toughness and encouragement to further their chances at success. The show focuses on the daily struggles and successes of the comics, Goldie, and the cutthroat competitors in the industry.

== Cast and characters ==
=== Main ===
- Melissa Leo as Golda "Goldie" Herschlag: a brassy comedy club owner (loosely based on Mitzi Shore).
- Ari Graynor as Cassie Feder: an ambitious comedian from Wink, Texas, and Clay's ex-girlfriend.
- Clark Duke as Ron Shack: a Boston comic who travels with Eddie to LA.
- Michael Angarano as Eddie Zeidel: a Boston comic and Clay's friend who travels with Ron to LA.
- Andrew Santino as Billy Hobbs: a comedy club favorite.
- Stephen Guarino as "Sully" Patterson: a zany stand-up comedian (season one; guest for season two).
- Erik Griffin as Ralph Carnegie: a Vietnam vet, comic, and writer for Sonny & Cher.
- RJ Cyler as Adam Proteau: a struggling stand-up comedian.
- Al Madrigal as Edgar "Manny" Martinez: a loose-cannon comedian
- Jake Lacy as Nick Beverly: a stand-up comedian who returns to Los Angeles after being on the road.

=== Recurring ===
- Ginger Gonzaga as Maggie: Arnie's / Ron's girlfriend, a waitress at the club
- Jon Daly as Arnie: a struggling comic
- Obba Babatundé as Barton Royce
- W. Earl Brown as Teddy
- Jeffrey Nordling as Eli Goldman
- Rick Overton as Mitch Bombadier: an executive for The Tonight Show
- Dylan Baker as Johnny Carson: the host of The Tonight Show.
- Brianne Howey as Kay: a waitress at the club
- Ryan Alosio as Miles Farber: an ambitious talent agent
- Tommy Snider as Wolfman Jack: a famous disc jockey in Los Angeles
- Brad Garrett as Reinaldo Stanziani / Roy Martin (season two): a legendary comedian who comes to the club and offers the up-and-coming comedians advice. Goldie attempts to join into a partnership with him as she expands her business pursuits.
- Nicole Ari Parker as Gloria Whitfield (season two): a producer for Soul Train who enters into a relationship with one of the comics
- Stefania LaVie Owen as Amanda "Mandy" Robbins (season 2): Goldie's estranged daughter who reenters her life after running away at 17.
- Xosha Roquemore as Dawn Lima (season two): a female comic who is new to Los Angeles and struggling with her sexual identity as she enters into a sexual relationship with Nick
- Dana Gould as Bruce (season two): Adam's agent
- Beau Mirchoff as Saul Hudson (season two): a TV producer for whom Ralph works

=== Guest ===
- Joey "Coco" Diaz as "Taffy"
- Sebastian Stan as Calogero "Clay" Apuzzo: Cassie's ex-boyfriend, who hits stardom with his first Tonight Show appearance and subsequently commits suicide
- Alfred Molina as Carl: a mediocre talent manager
- Robert Forster as Guy Apuzzo: Clay's father
- Cathy Moriarty as Angie Apuzzo: Clay's mother
- Scott Cohen as Roy Brenner
- Tyrone Evans Clark as The Clubgoer (Guest Star)
- David Paymer as Ernie Falk
- Richard Kind as Marty Dansak
- Dom Irrera as James Seamus "Fitzy" Fitzpatrick (9 episodes)
- Sarah Hay as Tawny
- Sarah Stiles as Toni "The Tiger" Luddy: a comedy club groupie
- Jere Burns as Sid Robbins (Goidie's ex-husband)
- Jocko Sims as Melvin
- John Caponera as Howard Leetch
- Armen Weitzman as Rob Cheevers
- Dennis Haskins as Father Jacobs
- Ken Lerner as Sam Doak
- Brandon Ford Green as Richard Pryor
- Chris Regan as Monty Hall

== Episodes ==
Season	Episodes	Originally released	
Season	Episodes	First released	Last released
1	10	May 22, 2017	August 13, 2017
2	10	May 6, 2018	July 8, 2018

=== Season 1 (2017) ===
No. overall	No. in season	Title	Directed by	Written by	Original release date	U.S. viewers (millions)
1	1	"Pilot"	Jonathan Levine	Dave Flebotte	May 22, 2017 (online); June 4, 2017 (Showtime)	0.167
2	2	"Midnight Special"	Jon S. Baird	Cindy Chupack	June 5, 2017 (online); June 11, 2017 (Showtime)	0.120
3	3	"The Cost of a Free Buffet"	Iain B. MacDonald	Dave Holstein	June 18, 2017	0.124
4	4	"Sugar and Spice"	David Evans	Dave Flebotte	June 25, 2017	0.113
5	5	"The Return"	Jake Schreier	Jeff Shakoor	June 30, 2017 (online); July 9, 2017 (Showtime)	0.114
6	6	"Girls Are Funny, Too"	Iain B. MacDonald	Cindy Caponera	July 16, 2017	0.148
7	7	"My Rifle, My Pony and Me"	Adam Davidson	Martin Weiss	July 23, 2017	0.126
8	8	"The Unbelievable Power of Believing"	Kate Dennis	Cindy Chupack & Justin Hillian	July 30, 2017	0.135
9	9	"Lingchi"	Julie Anne Robinson	Alex Herschlag	August 6, 2017	0.163
10	10	"Creative Indifferences"	Adam Davidson	Dave Flebotte	August 13, 2017	0.215

=== Season 2 (2018) ===
No. overall	No. in season	Title	Directed by	Written by	Original release date	U.S. viewers (millions)
11	1	"Gone with the Wind"	Adam Davidson	Dave Flebotte	May 6, 2018	0.168
12	2	"Plus One"	Adam Davidson	Cindy Chupack	May 13, 2018	0.232
13	3	"Bete Noire"	Ernest R. Dickerson	Peter Elkoff	May 20, 2018	0.207
14	4	"The Mattresses"	Jake Schreier	Martin Weiss	May 27, 2018	0.159
15	5	"Heroes and Villains"	Adam Davidson	Justin Hillian	June 3, 2018	0.197
16	6	"Between Us"	Salli Richardson-Whitfield	Diarra Kilpatrick	June 10, 2018	0.179
17	7	"Call Me a Ham"	Mark Polish	Jessica Lee Williamson & Dave Flebotte	June 17, 2018	0.164
18	8	"Now You See Me, Now You Don't"	Cindy Chupack	Peter Elkoff	June 24, 2018	0.184
19	9	"Deathbed Confessions"	Jessica Yu	Cindy Chupack	July 1, 2018	0.145
20	10	"Lines Crossed"	Adam Davidson	David Flebotte	July 8, 2018	0.162
