= Maxine Lapiduss =

American comedian

- Occupations: Comedian, businessperson, television producer and writer
- Years active: 1987–present

Maxine Lapiduss is an American comedian, singer, television writer, director, producer, entrepreneur, and branding strategist. She is a graduate of Taylor Allderdice High School and the Carnegie Mellon University School of Drama, both in Pittsburgh, Pennsylvania, where she was born and raised.

Lapiduss wrote and produced comedy series including Dharma & Greg, Ellen, Roseanne, Home Improvement and more.

== Storyverse Studios ==
Lapiduss is the co-founder and CEO of Storyverse Studios, an entertainment company founded in Los Angeles in 2014. Storyverse develops and produces story-driven properties within a multi-platform universe of entertainment. Their first property, Find Me I'm Yours, launched on November 3, 2014, and begins as a media rich ebook, written and designed by writer/artist/web innovator, Hillary Carlip, and published by Rosetta Books.

== Television writer/producer/director ==
Lapiduss wrote and produced the last season of Ellen (three Emmy nominations), Roseanne, (Emmy nomination as Best Comedy Series and a Golden Globe award), Home Improvement (People's Choice Awards for Best Comedy Series), Dharma & Greg, and Situation: Comedy, a Bravo reality series Lapiduss starred in and produced with Sean Hayes (Will and Grace) about how to make a sitcom. She has directed the Disney Channel show, Jessie.

Lapiduss spent four months managing relationships and production on 40 episodes of the Russian adaptation of The King of Queens in Moscow. She also acted as Studio Executive and show runner for the pilots and post production of Sony International TV's adaptations of The Cosby Show and Rules of Engagement for CTC Media.

Lapiduss also co-founded non-profit Steeltown Entertainment Project, a teaching organization and production company whose mission is to bring film and TV production jobs back to Pittsburgh.

== Creative strategist ==
Lapiduss has a consulting company, Lapiduss Creative. Lapiduss ran an online digital networks, Voxxy (1999-2001). Lapiduss raised financing, and contracted talent for Voxxy involvement. Lapiduss recruited show runners and producers to create content, and developed branded "advertainment" for entertainment companies, record labels, and businesses. Voxxy won the 2000 Bandie Broadband Award for innovation in the category "Newest New Thing."

== Performer ==
Lapiduss has written, starred in, and produced several one-woman variety shows including "Mackie's Back in Town", and has been honored with a nomination for Best Cabaret Artist (Female) 2011, by Broadway World Los Angeles.

Her video "Scared About Life Without Oprah" included a cameo by Glee's Jane Lynch and was featured in The Huffington Post, USA Today, and TV Guide.
