= The Puppy Episode =

- Ellen episodes
- Ellen Morgan comes out.
- Episode nos.: Season 4 Episodes 22/23
- Directed by: Gil Junger
- Story by: Ellen DeGeneres
- Teleplay by: Mark Driscoll; Tracy Newman; Dava Savel; Jonathan Stark
- Production code: C385/C386
- Original air date: April 30, 1997

Guest appearances
- Steven Eckholdt – Richard; Laura Dern – Susan; Oprah Winfrey – Therapist; Billy Bob Thornton – The Grocer; Jenny Shimizu – The Woman in the Aisle; Demi Moore – The Sample Lady; k.d. lang – The First Cashier / The Singer / Janine; Gina Gershon – The Second Cashier; Jorja Fox – The Attractive Woman; Dwight Yoakam – Bagboy; Betty DeGeneres – Woman at Airport; Melissa Etheridge - Herself

Episode chronology
← Previous "The Clip Show Patient"	Next → "Hello Muddah, Hello Faddah"
- Ellen season 4

"The Puppy Episode" is a two-part episode of the American television sitcom Ellen. The episode details lead character Ellen Morgan's realization that she is a lesbian and her coming out. It was the 22nd and 23rd episode of the series's 4th season. The episode was written by series star Ellen DeGeneres with Mark Driscoll, Tracy Newman, Dava Savel and Jonathan Stark and directed by Gil Junger. It originally aired on ABC on April 30, 1997. The title was used as a code name for Ellen's coming out so as to keep the episode under wraps.

DeGeneres began negotiating with ABC in 1996 to have Morgan come out. When word of the negotiations got out, DeGeneres found herself at the center of intense speculation about when she or her character, or both, would come out. With DeGeneres hinting at her and her character's coming out both off-screen and within the show, the rumors were confirmed when the episode went into production in March 1997.

Despite threats from advertisers and religious groups, "The Puppy Episode" enjoyed enormous success, won multiple awards and became a cultural phenomenon. Nonetheless, DeGeneres and her show quickly garnered criticism for being "too gay"; the series was canceled after one more season due to lower ratings, and DeGeneres and guest star Laura Dern faced career backlashes.

== Plot ==
Ellen goes out to dinner with her old friend Richard, a reporter who is in town to cover a story. His producer Susan joins them for dessert and she and Ellen hit it off. Ellen goes back to Richard's hotel room. He comes on to her and an uncomfortable Ellen leaves. She runs into Susan in the hall and returns with her to her room. They continue to enjoy each other's company until Susan tells Ellen that she is gay and that she thought Ellen might be too. Ellen denies it and accuses Susan of trying to "recruit" her. After Susan jokes about getting a toaster oven for the recruitment, an agitated Ellen leaves Susan's room and returns to Richard's room, determined to have sex with him to prove to herself that she is not gay.

The next day, Ellen tells her friends at the bookstore that she and Richard had amazing sex. She tells her therapist the truth, that she could not have sex with Richard. Ellen laments that she just wants someone with whom she clicks. When her therapist asks if she has ever clicked with anyone, Ellen replies, "Susan."

A message from Richard that he is leaving town ahead of schedule sends Ellen rushing to the airport to see Susan. Ellen tells Susan that she was right and comes out as gay, inadvertently broadcasting her announcement over the airport's public address system. Ellen assumes that Susan will be leaving with Richard, but in fact, Susan will be staying in town for several more days.

Ellen has a dream in which she is grocery shopping. She is offered a special lesbian discount on melons, her sexuality is announced to the other shoppers, she is offered a granola bar, she is beckoned toward a checkout lane with a pink triangular sign reading "10 lesbians or less" and given her grocery total of "a lesbian twenty-nine" ($11.29). She discusses the dream with her therapist and realizes that she has been suppressing her sexuality for many years. Her therapist encourages her to come out to her friends, but Ellen is worried about not being accepted.

Ellen has her friends over to come out to them. Before they arrive, she comes out to her gay neighbor Peter. When everyone else arrives, Ellen balks at telling them, but Peter outs her. Ellen confirms that it is true and her friends are all supportive of her, although Paige is hesitant.

The next day Ellen and Susan are at the bookstore. Susan tells Ellen that she does have feelings for her, but she is in a long-term relationship. Ellen is heartbroken and Susan leaves. To cheer her up, her friends take her to a lesbian coffeehouse.

During the tag scene, Susan introduces Ellen to Melissa Etheridge, who confirms that Ellen is gay and, after completing the necessary paperwork, awards Susan a toaster oven.

== Production ==
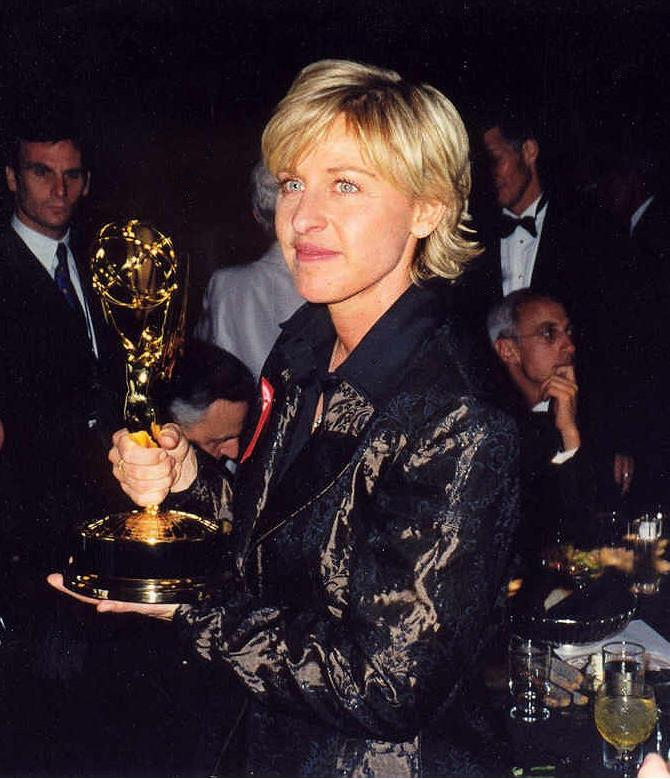
Ellen DeGeneres, an Emmy winner, came out, as did her fictional counterpart.

By the end of the third season of Ellen, producers were becoming frustrated by the series's lack of focus and the lack of interest that the character Ellen Morgan displayed toward the standard sitcom tropes of dating and relationships. Disney boss Michael Eisner suggested that since the character showed no inclination toward dating, she should get a puppy. "It was an indication of just how lost the show was that network executives would be excited by Ellen buying a puppy", said executive producer Mark Driscoll. It was this suggestion that gave writer Jonathan Stark the idea to give that working title to the episode, and it stuck.

In the summer of 1996 DeGeneres and the show's other writers opened negotiations with ABC and its parent company, Disney, to have Ellen Morgan come out during season four. Word of the secret negotiations leaked in September of that year, sparking a storm of speculation as to whether the character, the actress, or both would come out. The LGBT media watchdog group Gay and Lesbian Alliance Against Defamation (GLAAD) launched a "Let Ellen Out!" campaign, including an "Ellen Watch" website. Disney rejected the first draft of the script, with Disney executive Dean Valentine stating that it did not go far enough. Director Junger reported that Valentine said "'If we're going to do it, let's do it.' Once he said to go as far as we could, it became great fun to write." Once final approval from Disney was secured, ABC announced on March 3, 1997, that Ellen Morgan would be coming out. "The Puppy Episode" went into production on March 7. Guest stars sought to be a part of the project. According to writer/producer Driscoll, "Suddenly all these talented actors were lining up to be in the episode. It had a buzz around it that it would be an historic episode. When Oprah came on—and she was so wonderful and open and giving—it suddenly had this great weight to it."

With word of the episode out, backlash began. The studio received at least one bomb threat and Driscoll received a telephone call informing him he was going to Hell. DeGeneres was followed by car to the studio on at least one occasion by a "suspicious man". Some within the entertainment industry assumed that the coming out was simply a ratings stunt, to which DeGeneres responded, "I did it selfishly for myself and because I thought it was a great thing for the show, which desperately needed a point of view."

DeGeneres began dropping hints in the episodes leading up to "The Puppy Episode" that she was planning to come out in real life and have her character come out as well, including such sight gags as Ellen Morgan stumbling into an actual closet so that she could come out of it. She also invited comment with her off-screen actions, as when she kissed k.d. lang while presenting her with an award at a Los Angeles Gay and Lesbian Center function in early 1997. DeGeneres finally officially came out in Time magazine, with an April 14, 1997, cover emblazoned with the words, "Yep, I'm Gay". Ellen also appeared on The Oprah Winfrey Show with then-girlfriend Anne Heche on the scheduled broadcast date of "The Puppy Episode".

DeGeneres commented on her months of hinting at her sexuality and the media frenzy within the episode itself, giving Ellen Morgan's friends lines like "Ellen, are you coming out or not?!" and "Yeah, quit jerking us around and come out already!" Morgan's therapist comments that if Morgan does not come out she will "continue to have these dreams and then it's going to show up in your waking life as these little clues that get more and more obvious. And eventually tiresome." She also says that Morgan cannot attribute her sexuality to media influence.

"Susan. I'm gay"
Ellen comes out as gay, followed by studio audience applauding, "laugh[ing] and cheer[ing]"

Director Junger recalled the time when actress DeGeneres "would burst into tears" while rehearsing every time the scene where her character Ellen Morgan comes out to Susan at the airport, which Junger considered "emotionally the most difficult scene to rehearse". When the character Ellen Morgan comes out as gay via "the airport microphone," the studio audience applauded, "laughed and cheered", and the airport extras "look shocked". DeGeneres's mother Betty was among the scene's extras.

== Reception ==
"The Puppy Episode" and DeGeneres's attendant coming out generated enormous publicity before the show aired. Right-wing groups like the American Family Association pressured ABC to drop the storyline and Ellen sponsors not to advertise; two occasional advertisers, J. C. Penney and Chrysler, decided not to buy time during the episode. Another sponsor, Wendy's, decided not to advertise on Ellen again at all. Despite these losses of potential advertisers, ABC turned away ads from two LGBT-oriented sponsors, the Human Rights Campaign (HRC) and lesbian vacation company Olivia Cruises. Jerry Falwell called DeGeneres "Ellen Degenerate", to which DeGeneres responded, "I've been getting that since the fourth grade. I guess I'm happy I could give him work." GLAAD organized "Come Out With Ellen" house parties across the United States and HRC created "Ellen Coming Out House Party" kits that included invitations, posters and an Ellen trivia game. HRC had initially planned to send out about 300 kits. Deluged with requests, they ended up sending out about 3,000. ABC affiliate WBMA-LP in Birmingham, Alabama, citing "family values", first sought ABC's permission to move the episode out of prime-time to a late-night slot. When ABC declined the request, the affiliate refused to air the episode at all. Local LGBT organization Pride Birmingham arranged for a satellite feed of the episode and rented a 5,000-seat theatre for a viewing party, with about 1,000 people attending. Local activists circulated a petition requesting that Abilene, Texas-area affiliate KTXS-TV not air the episode but were unsuccessful.

"The Puppy Episode" was the highest-rated episode ever of Ellen, drawing some 42 million viewers. "The Puppy Episode" won a Primetime Emmy Award for Outstanding Writing for a Comedy Series and a second for Outstanding Multi-Camera Picture Editing. The episode won a Peabody Award and DeGeneres won a GLAAD Media Award in 1998. Show character Ellen Morgan's coming out has been described as "the most hyped, anticipated, and possibly influential gay moment on television". GLAAD credits Ellen with paving the way for such LGBT-themed programming as Will & Grace, The L Word, and Ugly Betty and it has been suggested that Ellen and these other series presenting LGBT characters have helped to reduce societal prejudice against LGBT people. The episode was ranked #35 & #46 on TV Guide's list of "100 Greatest Episodes of All-Time".

In the United Kingdom, "The Puppy Episode" also drew a huge positive reaction and high ratings for Channel 4, the network which carried Ellen. To celebrate the success and DeGeneres's coming out, Channel 4 and talk show host Graham Norton flew DeGeneres in to London and held a celebration for her and her family. Channel 4 also dedicated an entire night of programming to the LGBT community including DeGeneres herself as part of their "Coming Out Night". DeGeneres was deeply moved by the celebration, saying that it meant the world to her to have a network that supported her no matter what.

Following "The Puppy Episode", Ellen was renewed for another season. ABC prefaced each episode of season five with a parental advisory warning. DeGeneres strongly criticized ABC for including the warnings, saying in an interview with Entertainment Weekly, "It was like this voice like you're entering some kind of radiation center. It was very offensive, and you don't think that's going to affect ratings?" DeGeneres further noted demonstrable hypocrisy on the part of ABC, citing episodes of ABC series The Drew Carey Show and Spin City which included two men kissing (the Carey episode was even promoted using the kiss). "There's no disclaimer on [the Carey show] at all, because it's two heterosexual men, and they're making fun of homosexuality...[Spin City aired without a disclaimer] because neither (Michael J. Fox nor Michael Boatman) is really gay in real life." Episodes after "The Puppy Episode" dealt with Ellen's coming out to her parents and boss, quitting her job at the bookstore and finding a series of new jobs. Other episodes dealt with her search for a romantic partner and learning more about the LGBT community. The series received some criticism for the increase in LGBT content. Chaz Bono, who was at the time working for GLAAD, was quoted as saying, "[Ellen] is so gay it's excluding a large part of our society. A lot of the stuff on it is somewhat of an inside joke. It's one thing to have a gay lead character, but it's another when every episode deals with specific gay issues." Bono would later say that the comments were taken out of context. Ellen was canceled after its fifth season.

With the cancellation of Ellen, DeGeneres focused her energy on stand-up comedy, where she had begun her career. She returned to network television in 2001 with the short-lived The Ellen Show, in which her character Ellen Richmond was openly lesbian from the start, before finding renewed success with her talk show The Ellen DeGeneres Show, beginning in 2003, which ran for 19 seasons until May 2022.

Guest star Laura Dern faced backlash over her appearance in the episodes. In a 2007 interview for DeGeneres's talk show commemorating the tenth anniversary of "The Puppy Episode", Dern stated that she did not work for a year and a half because of playing Susan. Nonetheless, Dern said that she was grateful for the "extraordinary experience and opportunity" of being a part of the episode. Speaking of her experience, DeGeneres said, "It was a huge step in my life. I think people sensed the honesty in it. I think it helped a lot of people, and still to this day I hear about parents and children being able to have an honest conversation through watching that show. That's ultimately what television can be: It can get conversations started."
