= David Flebotte =

American television producer and writer (1959–2025)

- Born: David Guy Flebotte; October 12, 1959; Hanson, Massachusetts, U.S.
- Died: July 8, 2025 (aged 65); Missoula, Montana, U.S.
- Education: Emerson College
- Occupations: Television producer; writer
- Years active: 1993–2024
- Spouse: Sandra Lindqvist (m. 2012)
- Children: 2

David Guy Flebotte (October 12, 1959 – July 8, 2025) was an American television producer and writer.

== Background ==
Flebotte was born in Hanson, Massachusetts, on October 12, 1959. He attended Emerson College, where a professor encouraged him to take up writing. He briefly did stand-up comedy, performing at open mics at Boston comedy clubs.

== Career ==
Flebotte produced and wrote for television programs including I'm Dying Up Here, Good Advice, Ellen, Just Before I Go, Commando Nanny, Taxi 0-22, Masters of Sex, 8 Simple Rules, Will & Grace, The Sopranos, Desperate Housewives, Suddenly Susan, Sherri, Dirt, Raising Hope, State of Mind, Chance, George Lopez, The 5 Mrs. Buchanans, Boardwalk Empire, The Geena Davis Show and The Bernie Mac Show. His final credit was the series Tulsa King, producing and writing episodes in the show's first and second seasons.

As a hockey fan and Boston Bruins supporter, Flebotte wrote a column for the first chapter of the 2009 book Puck Funnies: Hockey Humor, Hilarity & Hi-Jinx, published by The Hockey News.

In 1999, he was nominated for a Primetime Emmy Award in the category Best Animated Program for his work on the television program The PJs. His nomination was shared with Steve Tompkins, Larry Wilmore, Brian Grazer, Ron Howard, Tony Krantz, Eddie Murphy, Will Vinton, Tom Turpin, Bill Freiberger, Mary Sandell, David Bleiman Ichioka, Michael Price, J. Michael Wendel, Al Jean, Mike Reiss, Les Firestein, Donald R. Beck and Mark Gustafson. He was nominated twice –in 2012 and 2013– for a WGA Award for his work on Boardwalk Empire.

== Personal life and death ==
Flebotte was married to Sandra Lindqvist from 2012 and had two children.

Flebotte was diagnosed with cystic fibrosis when he was a child, and was not expected to survive to adulthood. In the late 1990s, he underwent a double lung transplant. He died from cystic fibrosis at a hospital in Missoula, Montana, on July 8, 2025, at the age of 65.

== Filmography ==
Flebotte worked extensively in television as a writer and producer, contributing to both comedies and dramas across major networks and streaming platforms. He was best known for creating the Showtime series I'm Dying Up Here and producing shows such as Desperate Housewives, Boardwalk Empire, and Tulsa King.

=== Film ===
| Year(s) | Title | Role(s) | Notes |
|---|---|---|---|
| 2014 | Just Before I Go | Writer | |
| 2014 | Backlash | Co-writer | Short film |

=== Television ===
| Year(s) | Title | Role(s) | Notes |
|---|---|---|---|
| 2022–2024 | Tulsa King | Co-executive producer, writer | 14 episodes (producer), 4 episodes (writer) |
| 2017–2018 | I'm Dying Up Here | Creator, executive producer, writer | 26 episodes total, wrote 6 episodes |
| 2017 | Chance | Writer | 1 episode |
| 2016 | Brothers in Atlanta | Executive producer | TV movie |
| 2014–2015 | Masters of Sex | Co-executive producer, writer | 24 episodes (producer), 4 episodes (writer) |
| 2012–2014 | Raising Hope | Consulting producer | 24 episodes |
| 2011–2013 | Boardwalk Empire | Writer | 3 episodes |
| 2008–2012 | Desperate Housewives | Co-executive producer, consulting producer, writer | 70 episodes (co-exec), 23 episodes (consulting), 7 episodes (writer) |
| 2009 | Sherri | Creator, executive producer, writer | 15 episodes |
| 2007–2008 | Dirt | Co-executive producer, writer | 7 episodes (producer), 3 episodes (writer) |
| 2007 | Men in Trees | Consulting producer | 5 episodes |
| 2007 | State of Mind | Writer | 1 episode |
| 2004–2005 | Will & Grace | Executive producer, writer | 14 episodes (producer), 1 episode (writer) |
| 2004 | Commando Nanny | Executive producer | Unaired |
| 2003–2004 | 8 Simple Rules | Consulting producer, writer | 37 episodes (producer), 3 episodes (writer) |
| 2002–2003 | The Bernie Mac Show | Co-executive producer, writer | 10 episodes (producer), 2 episodes (writer) |
| 2002 | The Sopranos | Teleplay writer | Episode: "Watching Too Much Television" |
| 2002 | George Lopez | Consulting producer | 3 episodes |
| 2000–2001 | The Geena Davis Show | Executive producer, writer | 10 episodes (producer), 1 episode (writer) |
| 1999–2000 | The PJs | Supervising/co-executive producer, writer | 3 episodes (writer), 3 episodes (producer) |
| 1999–2000 | Suddenly Susan | Consulting producer, writer | 13 episodes (producer), 1 episode (writer) |
| 1995–1997 | Ellen | Co-producer, executive story editor, writer | 10 episodes (producer), 1 episode (editor), 7 episodes (writer) |
| 1994–1995 | The 5 Mrs. Buchanans | Story editor, writer | 3 episodes (editor), 2 episodes (writer) |
| 1994 | Good Advice | Writer | 1 episode |

== Awards and nominations ==
| Year | Association | Category | Work | Result | Reference |
|---|---|---|---|---|---|
| 1999 | Emmy Awards | Outstanding Animated Program | The PJs | Nominated | |
| 2012 | Writers Guild of America Awards | Television: Dramatic Series | Boardwalk Empire | Nominated | |
| 2013 | Writers Guild of America Awards | Television: Dramatic Series | Boardwalk Empire | Nominated | |
