= Dava Savel =

American television producer and writer

Dava Savel is an American television producer, writer and professor. She has written and produced for Will & Grace, That's So Raven, Sonny with a Chance, Dharma & Greg, Grace Under Fire, Dream On and Ellen for which she won a Primetime Emmy Award for co-writing "The Puppy Episode".
