= Rob Schiller =

American television director

- Born: March 3, 1959 (age 67)
- Occupations: Television director and producer
- Years active: 1984–present

Rob Schiller (born March 31, 1959) is an American television director and producer.

Since 1984, Schiller has amassed a number of directorial credits namely A Different World, Ned and Stacey, Living Single, Ellen, Malcolm & Eddie, The King of Queens, Two and a Half Men, 'Til Death, Anger Management, $#*! My Dad Says and other television series.

In 1990 and 1991, Schiller won a Daytime Emmy Award for Outstanding Drama Series Directing Team for directing soap opera Santa Barbara.

In 2010, Schiller directed the stage play Greater Tuna at Boulder's Dinner Theatre in Boulder, Colorado.

In 2011, Schiller's first feature film, And They're Off was released.
