= Gil Junger =

American film and television director

- Born: November 7, 1954 (age 70); New York City, New York, U.S.
- Occupation(s): Film director, television director

Gil Junger (born November 7, 1954) is an American film and television director. He is best known for directing 10 Things I Hate About You (1999), his directorial film debut. He is a 1972 graduate of the Trinity-Pawling School in Pawling, New York.

== Filmography ==
=== Film ===
- 10 Things I Hate About You (1999)
- Black Knight (2001)
- If Only (2004)
- 10 Things I Hate About Life (2014) (Unfinished)
- Think Like a Dog (2020)

TV movies

- Being Dunbar (1999)
- Earthquake (2004)
- Happy Campers (2008)
- My Fake Fiancé (2009)
- Beauty & the Briefcase (2010)
- Christmas Cupid (2010)
- Teen Spirit (2011)
- Rip City (2012)
- Christmas Bounty (2013)
- Santa's Little Helper (2015)

Direct-to-video

- Get Smart's Bruce and Lloyd: Out of Control (2008)

=== Television ===
Year	Title	Notes
1987–1989	It's a Living	7 episodes
1993–1994	Nurses	21 episodes
1994–1995	Blossom	12 episodes
1996–1998	Ellen	30 episodes
1998	Two of a Kind	4 episodes
1999	Two Guys, a Girl and a Pizza Place	2 episodes
2000	Movie Stars	11 episodes
2001–2002	According to Jim	13 episodes
2002	8 Simple Rules	Episode: "Pilot"
2003–2006	Hope & Faith	35 episodes
2009–2010	10 Things I Hate About You	12 episodes, also series consultant
2011	Harry's Law	Episode: "Purple Hearts"
2012	Sullivan & Son	Episode: "The Prodigal Sister"
2014	Mystery Girls	2 episodes
2015	Table 58	Episode: "Pilot"
2015	Devious Maids	2 episodes
2017	K.C. Undercover	2 episodes

- The John Larroquette Show (1995)
- The Jeff Foxworthy Show (1995)
- The Office (1995)
- Minor Adjustments (1995)
- In the House (1995)
- Pearl (1996)
- Living Single (1996–1997)
- Chicago Sons (1997)
- Soul Man (1997)
- Dharma & Greg (1997)
- The Secret Lives of Men (1998)
- The Hughleys (1998)
- Zoe, Duncan, Jack and Jane (1999)
- Action (1999)
- Ladies Man (1999)
- Odd Man Out (1999)
- Daddio (2000)
- Movie Stars (2000)
- Inside Schwartz (2001)
- Less than Perfect (2002)
- The O'Keefes (2003)
- Rodney (2005–2006)
- Kyle XY (2006)
- In Case of Emergency (2007)
- Greek (2007)
- Rules of Engagement (2009)
- Glory Daze (2010)
