= David S. Rosenthal =

American writer and TV producer

David Samuel Rosenthal is an American writer and TV producer, best known as the executive producer of season seven of the popular comedy-drama Gilmore Girls and co-creator of the original Ellen TV series. He has also been known to work on The Middle and Jane the Virgin.

== Early life ==
Rosenthal is from Lawrenceville, New Jersey. His father is Anti-Defamation League Latin American Affairs director and human rights activist rabbi Morton Rosenthal.

== Career ==
Shortly after moving to Hollywood, Rosenthal was hired as a writer's assistant on the ABC sitcom Anything but Love. He began to write on his own and got a job on the show Nurses. Rosenthal was later hired as a staff writer on Anything but Love. When the show ended, he wrote for Laurie Hill, a program created by Neal Marlens and Carol Black, who also produced The Wonder Years. With Marlens and Black, Rosenthal helped develop a sitcom for Laurie Hill co-star Ellen DeGeneres. The show, entitled These Friends of Mine, became Ellen.

After a ten-year stint developing sitcoms for Jeffrey Katzenberg, Rosenthal was hired as a writer on the sitcom Spin City and was quickly promoted to showrunner.

In April 2006, it was announced that Gilmore Girls executive producers Amy Sherman-Palladino and her husband, Daniel, could not come to an agreement with The CW and would be leaving the show when their contracts expired that summer. Rosenthal, who worked on the show as a writer and producer for season six, was selected by Sherman-Palladino to replace her as showrunner. Though the season was considered uneven compared to the previous six, Rosenthal's writing and direction received praise.

== Personal life ==
Rosenthal was married to fellow Spin City writer Sarah Dunn. They divorced in 2001. He later quit his job on Spin City to focus on writing a controversial play about supermodel Heidi Klum. He married comedy writer Gracie Glassmeyer in 2015.

== Selected filmography ==
- The Really Loud House
- Jane the Virgin
- The Middle
- 90210
- 'Til Death
- Accidentally on Purpose
- Eastwick
- Men in Trees
- Gilmore Girls
- Hope & Faith
- Good Morning, Miami
- Two Guys, a Girl and a Pizza Place
- Spin City
- Arsenio
- Ellen
- Anything but Love
- Laurie Hill
- Nurses
