= Clea Lewis =

American actress

- Born: July 19, 1965 (age 61); Cleveland Heights, Ohio, U.S.
- Occupation: Actress
- Years active: 1991–present
- Spouse: Peter Ackerman
- Children: 2

Clea Lewis (born July 19, 1965) is an American actress, best known for her television role as Ellen Morgan (Ellen Degeneres)'s annoying friend Audrey Penney in the sitcom Ellen. Lewis also played Margaret Redding on Royal Pains and Deirdre Kemp on The Americans. She guest-starred in The Fresh Prince of Bel-Air and the pilot episode of Friends, and was a series regular on Flying Blind and Andy Barker, P.I. Additionally, she appeared in movies like The Rich Man's Wife, Diabolique, and Perfect Stranger, and is also known for her theatre roles, including on Broadway in Absurd Person Singular, and her voiceover work, such as in the movie Ice Age: The Meltdown and voicing Nicky Little in the Disney cartoon Pepper Ann.

== Personal life ==
Clea Lewis was born in Cleveland Heights, Ohio, to a writer mother and a former vaudeville performer and lawyer father. Lewis graduated from Brown University in 1987. She has two sons with her husband, playwright and children's book author Peter Ackerman: Stanley, born in 2002, and Alvin, born in 2005.

== Career ==
As well as playing Audrey Penney on Ellen, Lewis appeared on The Fresh Prince of Bel-Air and was a series regular on Flying Blind. She also appeared in the pilot episode of Friends, in which she played Frannie. She has appeared in numerous films, including Scotch & Milk, The Rich Man's Wife, and Diabolique. In 2000, she performed the voice of Amy Lawrence in Tom Sawyer. Lewis played Gina, a chatty ad agency worker, in 2007's Perfect Stranger.

Lewis played Margaret Redding on Royal Pains and Deirdre Kemp on The Americans. She also appeared on the short-lived Andy Barker, P.I. as Jenny Barker, the wife of the title character Andy Barker (Andy Richter).

Lewis's somewhat nasal, squeaky voice has meant a great deal of animation voice-over work for her, including in both television (ABC's Saturday morning cartoon, Pepper Ann) as Nicky Little and film (Ice Age: The Meltdown). She also recorded the book-on-CD for books 4-10 of The Princess Diaries book series.

== Filmography ==
=== Film ===
Year	Title	Role	Notes
1992	Hero	Sylvia	
1996	Diabolique	Lisa Campos	
1996	The Rich Man's Wife	Nora Golden	
1998	Scotch and Milk	Ilsa	
2000	Tom Sawyer	Amy Lawrence (voice)	
2000	The Office Party	Grace	Short film
2004	Superstore	Joan	Short film
2006	Ice Age: The Meltdown	Female Mini Sloth/Dung Beetle Mom (voice)	
2007	Perfect Stranger	Gina	
2009	Motherhood	Lily	
2009	Confessions of a Shopaholic	Miss Ptaszinski	
2009	Ice Age: Dawn of the Dinosaurs	Start Mom (voice)	
2013	Life of Crime	Tyra Taylor	
2020	Antarctica	Diane	

=== Television ===
Year	Title	Role	Notes
1991	Doogie Howser, M.D.	Lyla	Episode: "It's a Wonderful Laugh"
1992	The Fresh Prince of Bel-Air	Krista	Episode: "Hilary Gets a Life"
1992–1993	Flying Blind	Megan	Main cast (22 episodes)
1994	Friends	Franny	Episode: "The One Where Monica Gets a Roommate"
1994–1998	Ellen	Audrey Penney	Main cast (79 episodes)
1995	Mad About You	Salesperson	Episode: "Purseona"
1995	Double Rush	Danielle	Episode: "Love Letters"
1997–2001	Pepper Ann	Nicky Little (voice)	Main cast (63 episodes; 103 segments)
1998	All Dogs Go to Heaven: The Series	Additional voices	14 episodes
1998–1999	Maggie Winters	Rachel Tomlinson	Main cast (16 episodes)
1999	Tracey Takes On...	Carol	Episode: "Road Rage"
1999	The Angry Beavers	Wanda (voice)	Episode: "Tough Love/A Little Dad'll Do You"
2000	Madigan Men	Wendy	Episode: "Pilot"
2007	Andy Barker, P.I.	Jenny Barker	Main cast (6 episodes)
2008	Law & Order: Special Victims Unit	Heaven Moscowitz	Episode: "Trade"
2010	The New Adventures of Old Christine	Emily	Episode: "Truth or Dare"
2015	The Affair	Simone	Episode: "2.4"
2015–2016	Royal Pains	Margaret Redding	5 episodes
2017	Doubt	Tanya Gibson	Episode: "Pilot"
2017	The Americans	Deirdre Kemp	4 episodes
2017	The Blacklist	Alexa Girard	Episode: "Philomena (No. 61)"
2021	American Rust	Jillian	4 episodes
2026	Best Medicine	Sally Mylow	7 episodes

=== Theatre ===
Year	Title	Role	Venue	Notes
1998	All in the Timing	unknown role	Geffen Playhouse	
1999	Things You Shouldn't Say Past Midnight	Grace	Promenade Theatre	
2002	Once in a Lifetime	Miss Leighton	Adams Memorial Theatre	
2005	Absurd Person Singular	Jane	Biltmore Theatre	
