= Mark Driscoll (screenwriter) =

American television producer and writer

- Occupation(s): Television producer and writer
- Years active: 1989–present

Mark Driscoll is an American television producer and writer. He attended Boston Latin School and took a post graduate year at the Phillips Exeter Academy. Driscoll graduated from Harvard University in 1982; during his time there, he was a member of the Harvard Lampoon. He shared a Primetime Emmy Award for his writing on the sitcom Ellen for the episode "The Puppy Episode".

Driscoll's other television credits include Married... with Children, Suddenly Susan, According to Jim, Hope & Faith and 90210. He is currently working on Grey's Anatomy.
