= Ellen (TV series) =

American television sitcom (1994–1998)

- Also known as: These Friends of Mine (season 1)
- Created by: Neal Marlens; Carol Black; David S. Rosenthal
- Starring: Ellen DeGeneres; David Anthony Higgins; Clea Lewis; Joely Fisher; Jeremy Piven; Arye Gross; Holly Fulger; Maggie Wheeler
- Theme music composer: Johnny McElhone; Sharleen Spiteri
- Opening theme: "So Called Friend", performed by Texas (seasons 3–5)
- Composer: W. G. Snuffy Walden
- Country of origin: United States
- Original language: English
- No. of seasons: 5
- No. of episodes: 109 (list of episodes)

Production
- Executive producers: Mark Driscoll; David S. Rosenthal; Carol Black; Tim Doyle; Warren Bell; Eileen Heisler; DeAnn Heline; Dava Savel; Carol Black; Neal Marlens; Pamela Eells O'Connell; Sally Lapiduss
- Producers: Ellen DeGeneres; Tracy Newman; Jonathan Stark; David S. Rosenthal; Mark Grossan; Richard Day
- Camera setup: Multi-camera
- Running time: 30 minutes
- Production companies: The Black/Marlens Company; Touchstone Television

Original release
- Network: ABC
- Release: March 29, 1994 – July 22, 1998

Related
- The Ellen Show (2001–2002)

Ellen (stylized in all lowercase as ellen) is an American television sitcom that aired on ABC from March 29, 1994, to July 22, 1998, consisting of 109 episodes. Ellen DeGeneres stars as the title character of Ellen Morgan, a neurotic bookstore owner in her thirties. The title of the series was These Friends of Mine for the first season, but it was subsequently changed to avoid confusion with the NBC series Friends, which premiered in September 1994.

The series centered on Ellen's dealing with her quirky friends, her family, and the problems of daily life, set in Los Angeles. The series was one of the first American television programs to have a main character come out as gay; DeGeneres' character came out as a lesbian in the Season 4 episode "The Puppy Episode", which aired in April 1997, shortly after DeGeneres publicly revealed that she was gay in real life. This event received a great deal of media exposure, ignited controversy, and prompted ABC to place a parental advisory at the beginning of each episode.

The series' theme song (used in season 3 onwards) is a version of "So Called Friend" by Scottish band Texas with altered lyrics. A running gag during the third and fourth seasons was that each episode had a distinct/different opening credits sequence (often with singing and dancing and featuring popular celebrities as guest stars), resulting from Ellen's ongoing search for the perfect opening credits.

== Cast and characters ==
=== Overview ===
Character	Portrayed by	Appearances				
Character	Portrayed by	1	2	3	4	5
Ellen Morgan	Ellen DeGeneres	Main	Main	Main	Main	Main
Joe Farrell	David Anthony Higgins	Recurring	Main	Main	Main	Main†
Paige Clarke	Joely Fisher		Main	Main	Main	Main
Audrey Penney	Clea Lewis	Guest	Recurring	Main	Main	Main†
Spence Kovak	Jeremy Piven			Main	Main	Main†
Adam Green	Arye Gross	Main	Main	Main		
Holly Jamison	Holly Fulger	Main				
Anita Warwell	Maggie Wheeler	Main†				

† Though listed in many sources as a main character for the season indicated, this character actually only appeared in approximately half the season's episodes.

=== Main ===
Note: Between seasons one and two, there was not only a title change from These Friends of Mine to Ellen, but two main characters disappeared without explanation.

- Ellen DeGeneres as Ellen Inez Morgan: Ellen is the main character of the sitcom. In season one, Ellen works in a Los Angeles bookstore called "Buy the Book". In the second season, she purchases the bookstore from her boss and becomes its owner. Throughout season four, hints were made to her sexuality and near the end of season 4 in "The Puppy Episode," Ellen announced she was a lesbian. For the first one and a half seasons, Ellen lived in an apartment with roommate Adam. She lived alone after Adam moved out and then with her cousin Spence. Towards the end of season four, she bought her own house. Ellen's personality was likable and cheerful, but also somewhat clumsy and awkward, and with a persistent need to be liked. Her trademark behavior (and the main object of her comedy) was that she would digress, rambling and babbling, especially when nervous or embarrassed. An example of both her clumsiness and her need to please is found in the episode where she had Martha Stewart over for a dinner party and Ellen became highly stressed trying to organize the perfect dinner.
- Joely Fisher as Paige Clarke (seasons 2-5): Appearing in seasons two through five, Paige is Ellen's somewhat vain and promiscuous best friend who works for a movie studio. Paige planned to tie the knot with her boyfriend Matt Liston, but dumped him at the altar after resuming an affair she had with Ellen's cousin Spence. When Ellen comes out of the closet, Paige has the hardest time dealing with it (even harder than Ellen's parents). In the fourth-season finale, Paige finally comes to terms with it. Paige also likes to try on clothes and work on her singing voice. Her singing voice is powerful enough to blow objects off tables, as demonstrated in the season 2 episode "Ellen's Improvement".
- David Anthony Higgins as Joe Farrell (recurring, season 1; main, seasons 2–5): Appearing in all five seasons, Joe is a dour, sarcastic Canadian who works as the barista at the coffee shop inside Ellen's bookstore. His personal life is only touched upon, usually for comic relief in constant reference to misadventures he had in Moose Jaw. In the third season he becomes a member of the core group which aside from him consists of Ellen, Spence, Paige, and Audrey.
- Clea Lewis as Audrey Penney (guest, season 1; recurring, season 2; main, seasons 3-5): Audrey is Ellen's squeaky-voiced and exceedingly perky neighbor and later co-worker, seen usually in the color pink and whose catchphrase was the enthusiastic greeting "Hi, Ellen!" Ellen has something of a love–hate relationship with Audrey, often annoyed at her overly upbeat demeanor. But after Ellen comes out, Audrey is extremely supportive (and excited, saying that she thinks "it's SUPER!"), and she throws herself into the LGBT culture, ironically with more reverence than Ellen did. In her initial appearance in the first season, her personality and appearance were quite different, and Ellen complained about Audrey's dour and negative personality, but upon her reappearance later in season two she has developed her upbeat and perky demeanor. In season one, Ellen also refers to Audrey's husband, but he never appears, their off-screen divorce between seasons one and two possibly explaining Audrey's change of personality, and Audrey later dates several people, including Adam and Ron Palillo. It is revealed that she comes from a very well-off family, though she rejected her inheritance so that she could continue being an assistant at the bookstore.
- Jeremy Piven as Spencer "Spence" Kovak (seasons 3-5): Ellen's volatile but well-intentioned cousin from New York, who joined the cast in the third season. His arrival in Ellen's life coincides with the aftermath of a large Los Angeles earthquake that leads to the destruction and subsequent remodeling of the bookstore. Spence was training as a doctor, but was fired from his job for punching a patient and as a result spent the beginning of the third season bored and depressed. He begins training as a lawyer but after saving someone's life decides to resume his career in medicine. He and Paige had a love-hate relationship that began as constant fighting but later they became lovers and stayed such until a few episodes before the end of the series when the relationship ended amicably.
- Arye Gross as Adam Green (seasons 1-3): Appearing in seasons one through three, Adam is Ellen's roommate and friend since college. A photographer, he is completely unsuccessful with women and is frequently dumped. In the middle of the third season, Adam moves to England to work as a photographer for The Sun Times, but upon his departure, he reveals that he was harboring a crush on Ellen. She in turn lies that she has one on him too, but he finds out the truth and that creates tension between the two of them until shortly before he leaves.
- Holly Fulger as Holly Jamison (season 1): Ellen's friend, who is shy and self-conscious; Holly tries to avoid any trouble and is desperate to get along with the people around her. She actually would love to be the center of attention, though she doesn't dare to overcome her shyness. Her surname was never spoken or seen in the show.
- Maggie Wheeler as Anita (season 1): Ellen's friend and a main character in the show's first season, appearing in only seven episodes. Like Holly, she does not appear in subsequent seasons and is not mentioned again. She was mentioned by Holly to be much more attractive than her but, unlike Holly, most of her romantic relationships were never shown on screen.

=== Recurring ===
- Steven Gilborn as Harold Cornelius Morgan (seasons 1-5): Ellen's father. He is often somewhat clueless about what is going on around him. At one point, he and Ellen's mother Lois announce that they want to divorce, much to Ellen's dismay. They later reconcile.
- Alice Hirson as Lois Ellington Morgan (seasons 1-5): Ellen's mother, Lois spends much of her time nosing and interfering in Ellen's life. Before Ellen comes out of the closet, Lois is obsessed with finding Ellen a husband. At one point, she wants to divorce her husband, but they later reconcile.
- Patrick Bristow as Peter Barnes (seasons 2–5): Ellen's friend. He was a charity worker in the second season and a recurring role until the end of the series.
- Bruce Campbell as Ed Billik (season 4): Ed appeared in season four only as the new manager of Ellen's bookstore. He was a strict business type who frequently butted heads with Ellen over their management styles.
- Jack Plotnick as Barrett (seasons 3-5): Paige's assistant in season three. It is implied that he also goes on to marry Peter Barnes.
- Lisa Darr as Laurie Manning (season 5): Ellen's girlfriend. Laurie appears in eight episodes in the fifth and final season of Ellen. She and her daughter Holly (Kayla Murphy) become an increasingly important part of Ellen's life.

=== Notable guest stars ===
- Mary Tyler Moore appeared in two episodes, one of which was an opening sequence (episodes "Lobster Diary" and "Two Ring Circus")
- Emma Thompson won a Primetime Emmy Award for Outstanding Guest Actress in a Comedy Series. for her appearance (episode "Emma")
- The band Texas, who sang the show's opening theme song, appeared in an opening sequence
- The band Captain & Tennille also appeared in two opening sequences (the same one used twice) (episodes "Splitsville, Man" and "Reversal of Misfortune")
- Ellen's real-life mother Betty DeGeneres appeared in two episodes, one of which was in an opening sequence (episodes "The Puppy Episode" and "Makin' Whoopie")
- Ellen's brother Vance DeGeneres also appeared in two episodes ("Ellen's Choice" and "Ellen Unplugged")
- Wayne Newton (the episode "Secrets & Ellen" is part of a Viva Las Vegas crossover with Grace Under Fire, Coach, and The Drew Carey Show)
- Drew Carey (the episode "Secrets & Ellen" is part of a Viva Las Vegas crossover with Grace Under Fire, Coach, and The Drew Carey Show)
- Brett Butler (the episode "Secrets & Ellen" is part of a Viva Las Vegas crossover with Grace Under Fire, Coach, and The Drew Carey Show)
- Janeane Garofalo (episode "Two Mammograms and a Wedding")
- Kaley Cuoco as Young Ellen (episode "The Bubble-Gum Incident")
- Steven Eckholdt (episode "The Puppy Episode")
- Laura Dern (episode "The Puppy Episode")
- Oprah Winfrey (episode "The Puppy Episode")
- Billy Bob Thornton (episode "The Puppy Episode")
- Jenny Shimizu (episode "The Puppy Episode")
- Demi Moore (episode "The Puppy Episode")
- k.d. lang (episode "The Puppy Episode")
- Gina Gershon (episode "The Puppy Episode")
- Jorja Fox (episode "The Puppy Episode")
- Dwight Yoakam (episode "The Puppy Episode")
- Melissa Etheridge (episode "The Puppy Episode")
- Sully Diaz (episode "The Promotion")
- Lyle Waggoner as a date for Ellen's mom Lois (while separated) and Trisha Yearwood as herself in a country western dance club (episode "Not So Great Expectations")

== Episodes ==
Season	Episodes	Originally released	
Season	Episodes	First released	Last released
1	13	March 29, 1994	August 30, 1994
2	24	September 21, 1994	May 17, 1995
3	25	September 12, 1995	May 21, 1996
4	25	September 17, 1996	May 13, 1997
5	22	September 24, 1997	July 22, 1998

=== "The Puppy Episode" ===
In 1997, Ellen made American television history when the title character came out as a lesbian in the famous "Puppy Episode" (DeGeneres herself came out concurrent with the episode on The Oprah Winfrey Show and in Time). To ensure a memorable moment, the coming out scene was made into a gag where, at an airport, Ellen turns and tells Laura Dern's character "I'm gay!" – only to realize that she had turned right into the public address microphone, announcing her sexuality to the entire terminal. Ellen DeGeneres's mother Betty can briefly be seen as one of the people in the terminal with a shocked reaction to the announcement.

The episode was ranked No. 46 on TV Guide's 100 Greatest Episodes of All-Time. The revelation ignited a storm of controversy, prompting ABC to place a parental advisory at the beginning of each episode.

Ellen was successful enough in its early seasons to warrant annual renewal, due largely to DeGeneres's perceived appeal and comic ability, but only with Ellen's coming out did the show make its way into the wide public consciousness and hit a critical plateau. After the initial coming out frenzy, however, the show's ratings declined, and ABC began feeling the pain of a backlash regarding the "gay content" being exhibited. The final episodes of Ellen were criticized for focusing too much on gay issues. Eventually, even some members of the LGBT community, including Chaz Bono (who at the time was the media director for GLAAD), began to criticize the show's serious new tone as well. With falling viewership ABC cancelled the show in May 1998 after five seasons and the show's trajectory was not unusual for a sitcom, despite Ellen's claims to the contrary.

=== Viva Las Vegas ===
The episode "Secrets & Ellen" is part of a crossover with Grace Under Fire, Coach, and The Drew Carey Show set in Las Vegas. It features Brett Butler as Grace Kelly and Drew Carey as himself.

== Broadcast history ==
=== Ratings ===
Season		Episodes	Season premiere	Season finale	Ranking	Viewers (in millions)
1	1993–94	13^{[a]}	March 29, 1994	August 30, 1994	N/A	N/A
2	1994–95	24	September 21, 1994	May 17, 1995	#13	21.05
3	1995–96	25	September 13, 1995	May 21, 1996	#39	16.59
4	1996–97	25^{[a]}	September 18, 1996	May 13, 1997	#30	16.79
5	1997–98	22	September 24, 1997	July 22, 1998	#42	12.4

^{^{[a]}}Two episodes that aired in Season 3, "The Tape" and "The Mugging", were filmed at the same time as Season 1 and are included in the Season 1 DVD box set as "bonus episodes", and are not included in the Season 3 DVD release.

== Home media ==
A&E Home Video has released the entire series on DVD in Region 1. These DVDs do not have captioning or subtitles for the deaf and hearing impaired.

DVD name	Ep #	Release date
Season One	13	September 28, 2004
Season Two	24	February 22, 2005
Season Three	25	February 28, 2006
Season Four	25	September 26, 2006
Season Five	22	November 28, 2006
