= Tracy Newman =

American singer-songwriter

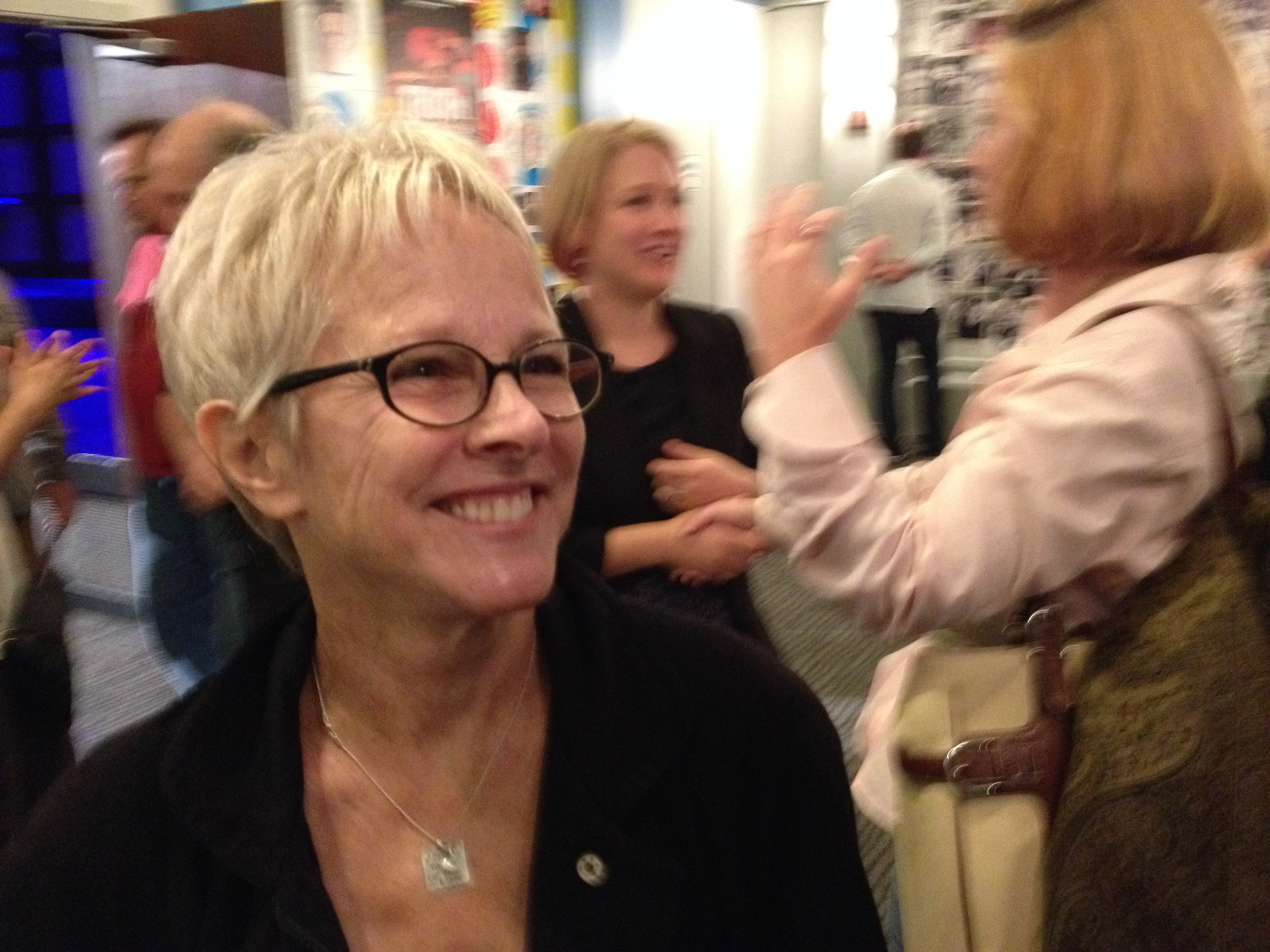
- Tracy Newman at the premiere of Charlotte's Shorts at The Groundlings, 2014
- Born: December 12, 1942 (age 83); Los Angeles, California, U.S.
- Occupations: Writer; director; producer; comedian; singer-songwriter
- Children: Charlotte Dean
- Awards: Primetime Emmy Award; Peabody Award

Tracy Ann Newman (born December 12, 1942) is an American television producer, writer, comedian and musician. Newman is a founding member of the improvisational theater troupe The Groundlings (as is her sister, Laraine Newman). She was co-creator and executive producer of the sitcom According to Jim (2001–2009). She is also a singer-songwriter, as well as an early member of The New Christy Minstrels and lead singer of Tracy Newman and The Reinforcements. She is the mother of artist/writer Charlotte Dean, with whom she co-directs the live comedy show Charlotte's Shorts.

== TV career ==
Newman appeared on the NET series for children called What's New? in 1965. With writing partner Jonathan Stark, Newman's credits include Cheers, The Nanny, The Drew Carey Show and Ellen for which she won a Primetime Emmy Award for co-writing "The Puppy Episode". and a Peabody Award. In 2001, Newman and Stark created the sitcom According to Jim starring Jim Belushi.

== Music career ==
Newman is the lead singer/songwriter of the folk music band Tracy Newman and the Reinforcements. In 2007, she released the album A Place in the Sun. Her second album, I Just See You, was released in 2012. Her third album, I Can Swing Forever, was released in 2014. It is for children and was released with a coloring book done by her daughter, Charlotte Dean.

== Radio and podcast appearances ==
Newman appeared on Ken Reid's TV Guidance Counselor podcast on October 11, 2016. On August 15, 2019, Newman guested on Mark Malkoff's The Carson Podcast.

== Filmography ==
External videos
- "Cripple Creek" with Tracy Newman on the 5-string banjo, Brooklyn College and Tracy Newman, 1965

- What’s New (1965) (TV, Filmed at Brooklyn College) (WNET)
- They Came from Outer Space (1990) (TV)
- Cheers (1991–1992) (TV)
- Bob (1992–1993) (TV)
- The Nanny (1994) (TV)
- The Barefoot Executive (with Jonathan Stark and Tim Doyle) (1995) (TV)
- Ellen (1995–1997) (TV)
- Hiller and Diller (1998) (TV)
- The Drew Carey Show (1999) (TV)
- According to Jim (2001–2009) (TV) (Creator)

== Discography ==
- A Place in the Sun (2007)
- I Just See You (2012)
- I Can Swing Forever (2014)
- Shoebox Town (2018)
- That's What Love Can Do to Your Heart (2018)
- Sing With Me (2019)
