= In the Best of Families =

In the Best of Families may refer to:

- "In the Best of Families", 1982 episode of CHiPs
- "In the Best of Families", 1991 episode of The Commish
- In the Best of Families (miniseries), 1994 American television miniseries
- In the Best of Families (play), 1931 Broadway play that ran at the Forrest Theatre

== See also ==
- In the Best Families, a 1950 detective novel by Rex Stout
