= 1971 in television =

The year 1971 involved some significant events in television. Below is a list of notable TV-related events.

== Events ==
- January 1 – The final cigarette advertisements are televised in the United States, with the final one occurring during that evening's broadcast of The Tonight Show Starring Johnny Carson on NBC.
- January 3 – BBC Open University broadcasts begin in the UK.
- January 12 – CBS airs the first episode of All in the Family, with a disclaimer at the beginning of the program warning viewers about potentially offensive content. Within a year, it became television's most popular program, and started a trend toward realism in situation comedies.
- January 27 – Valerie Barlow is electrocuted by a faulty hairdryer, and then perishes in a house fire on Coronation Street.
- February 23 – The Selling of the Pentagon documentary airs on CBS.
- March 2 – On an All in the Family episode, Archie and Edith get brand new next-door neighbors—Michael and Gloria's best friend, Lionel Jefferson (played by Mike Evans) and his parents. The episode marks Isabel Sanford's first appearance as Louise Jefferson; George Jefferson would not be depicted on-screen until 1973 (by Sherman Hemsley).
- March 11 – ABC cancels The Lawrence Welk Show after sixteen years on the network. The show, however, returns to the airwaves in syndication in September, where it would run for another eleven years.
- March 16 - CBS releases its schedule for the fall 1971 season, adding new shows with urban/suburban appeal and cancelling what Pat Buttram would later call "every show that had a tree in it," among them Buttram's Green Acres, The Beverly Hillbillies, and Mayberry R.F.D. Two other victims of CBS' "rural purge," Lassie and Hee Haw, would continue in first-run syndication that fall.
- April 3 – RTÉ launches Color television in Ireland with the Eurovision Song Contest 1971, held in Dublin.
- April 4 - PBS airs Peter Paul and Mary's "The Song is Love" movie documentary, directed by the most unlikely of people, horror movie's Tobe Hooper.
- June 7 – The UK children's magazine show Blue Peter buries a time capsule in the grounds of BBC Television Centre; it would be unearthed on the first episode of the year 2000.
- August 1 - The much-acclaimed 6-hour BBC miniseries The Six Wives of Henry VIII, starring Keith Michell as Henry, makes its U.S. premiere; CBS would air it over 6 consecutive Sundays through September 5.
- September 13 – U.S. network prime time programming shrinks as the original Prime Time Access Rule takes effect. NBC, unable to take advantage, immediately feels the pinch and fails to win any of the 1971–72 season's first thirteen weeks.
- October 2 – Soul Train debuts in syndication.
- October 21 – One-off drama Edna, the Inebriate Woman, starring Patricia Hayes, is shown by BBC One in its Play for Today slot.
- November – Top-rated As the World Turns loses the #1 slot in the daytime Nielsens for the first time since 1959.
- Michael Zaslow first appears as Roger Thorpe on The Guiding Light.

== Programs ==
- 60 Minutes (1968–present)
- A Charlie Brown Christmas (1965–present, aired annually)
- All in the Family (1971–1979)
- ABC's Wide World of Sports (1961–1998)
- All My Children (1970–2011)
- American Bandstand (1952–1989)
- Another World (1964–1999)
- As the World Turns (1956–2010)
- Bewitched (1964–1972)
- Blue Peter (UK) (1958–present)
- Bonanza (1959–1973)
- Bozo the Clown (1949–present)
- Bright Promise (1969–1972)
- Candid Camera (1948–2014)
- Captain Kangaroo (1955–1984)
- Charlie Brown's All-Stars (1966–1972, aired annually)
- Clangers (UK) (1969–1972)
- Come Dancing (UK) (1949–1995)
- Coronation Street, UK (1960–present)
- Crossroads (UK) (1964–1988, 2001–2003)
- Dad's Army (UK) (1968–1977)
- Days of Our Lives (1965–present)
- Death Valley Days (1952–1975)
- Dixon of Dock Green (UK) (1955–1976)
- Doctor Who, UK (1963–1989, 1996, 2005–present)
- Doomwatch (UK) (1970–1972)
- Face the Nation (1954–present)
- Famous Jury Trials (1971–1972)
- Four Corners (Australia) (1961–present)
- General Hospital (1963–present)
- Grandstand (UK) (1958–2007)
- Gunsmoke (1955–1975)
- Hallmark Hall of Fame (1951–present)
- Hawaii Five-O (1968–1980)
- Hee Haw (1969–1993)
- Here's Lucy (1968–1974)
- Hockey Night in Canada (1952–present)
- Ironside (1967–1975)
- It's Academic (1961–present)
- It's the Great Pumpkin, Charlie Brown (1966–present, aired annually)
- Jeopardy! (1964–1975, 1984–present)
- Kate (UK) (1970-1972)
- Kimba the White Lion (1966–1967), re-runs
- Laugh-In (1968–1973)
- Love is a Many Splendored Thing (1967–1973)
- Love of Life (1951–1980)
- Love, American Style (1969–1974)
- Magpie (UK) (1968–1980)
- Mannix (1967–1975)
- Marcus Welby, M.D. (1969–1976)
- Mary Tyler Moore (1970–1977)
- McCloud (1970–1977)
- Meet the Press (1947–present)
- The Mind of Mr. J.G. Reeder (UK) (1969-1971)
- Mission: Impossible (1966–1973)
- Mister Rogers' Neighborhood (1968–2001)
- Monday Night Football (1970–present)
- Monty Python's Flying Circus (UK) (1969–1974)
- Mutual of Omaha's Wild Kingdom (1963–1988, 2002–present)
- My Three Sons (1960–1972)
- One Life to Live (1968–2012)
- Opportunity Knocks, UK (1956–1978)
- Panorama, UK (1953–present)
- Password (1962–1967, 1971–1975, 1979–1982, 1984–1989, 2008–)
- Play for Today (UK) (1970–1984)
- Play School (1966–present)
- Professional Bowlers Tour (1962–1997)
- Room 222 (1969–1974)
- Search for Tomorrow (1951–1986)
- Sesame Street (1969–present)
- The Benny Hill Show (1969–1989)
- The Brady Bunch (1969–1974)
- The Carol Burnett Show (1967–1978)
- The Courtship of Eddie's Father (1969–1972)
- The Dean Martin Show (1965–1974)
- The Dick Cavett Show (1969–1974)
- The Doctors (1963–1982)
- The Doris Day Show (1968–1973)
- The Edge of Night (1956–1984)
- The Flip Wilson Show (1970–1974)
- The Good Old Days, UK (1953–1983)
- The Guiding Light (1952–2009)
- The Late Late Show, Ireland (1962–present)
- The Lawrence Welk Show (1955–1982)
- The Mike Douglas Show (1961–1981)
- The Mod Squad (1968–1973)
- The Money Programme (UK) (1966–present)
- The Newlywed Game (1966–1974)
- The Odd Couple (1970–1975)
- The Partridge Family (1970–1974)
- The Secret Storm (1954–1974)
- The Sky at Night (UK) (1957–present)
- The Today Show (1952–present)
- The Tonight Show (1954–present; 1962–92 as The Tonight Show Starring Johnny Carson)
- The Wonderful World of Disney (1969–79 under this title)
- The World Tonight, Philippines (1962–present)
- This Is Your Life, UK (1955–2003)
- Tom and Jerry (1965–1972, 1975–1977, 1980–1982)
- Top of the Pops (UK) (1964–2006)
- Truth or Consequences (1950–1988)
- What the Papers Say (UK) (1956–2008)
- What's My Line? (1968–1975, syndicated version)
- Where the Heart Is (1969–1973)
- World of Sport (UK) (1965–1985)
- Z-Cars, UK (1962–1978)

=== Debuts ===
- January 10 – Masterpiece Theatre on PBS (1971–)
- January 12 – All in the Family on CBS (1971–79)
- April 2 – The Return of Ultraman on TBS in Japan (1971–72)
- April 3 – Kamen Rider on MBS TV and NET in Japan (1971–73)
- April 10 – The Two Ronnies on BBC1 in the UK (1971–87)
- May 8 – Bel Ami on BBC2 (1971)
- June 19 - Parkinson on BBC1 (1971–82, 1987–88, 1998–2004, then on ITV from 2004 to 2007)
- July 4 - The Cat in the Hat (TV special) on CBS (1971)
- August 1 – The Sonny & Cher Comedy Hour on CBS (1971–74)
- September 11 –
  - Sabrina, the Teenage Witch (1971–72) and Help! It's the Hair Bear Bunch (1971–74) both on CBS Saturday Morning.
  - The Jackson 5ive (1971–73), The Funky Phantom (1971–72), and Lidsville (1971–73), all on ABC Saturday Morning.
- September 15 - Columbo (1971–78) as part of a rotation of detective shows on the NBC Mystery Movie
- September 17 –
  - McMillan & Wife on NBC (1971–77)
  - O'Hara, U.S. Treasury on CBS (1971–72)
- September 18 – The New Dick Van Dyke Show on CBS (1971–74)
- September 19 – The Jimmy Stewart Show on NBC (1971–72)
- September 21 – The Old Grey Whistle Test on BBC2 (1971–87)
- October 2 – Soul Train, the African-American equivalent to American Bandstand (1971–2006)
- October 10 – Upstairs, Downstairs in the UK on ITV (1971–75, 2010–)
- October 25 – The Electric Company, a skit-based children's program aimed at teaching reading skills, on PBS (1971–77)

=== Ending this year ===
Date	Show	Debut
January 1	Headmaster	1970
January 7	Nancy	1970
February 24	To Rome with Love	1969
March 4	Family Affair	1966
March 19	That Girl	1966
March 23	Julia	1968
March 23	The Beverly Hillbillies	1962
March 28	Hogan's Heroes	1965
March 29	Mayberry R.F.D.	1968
April 2	Dark Shadows	1966
April 27	Green Acres	1965
May 5	The Johnny Cash Show	1969
June 6	The Ed Sullivan Show	1948
July 24	UFO (UK)	1970
October 22	What's New	1959

=== Changes of network affiliation ===
Show	Moved from	Moved to
Hee Haw	CBS	Syndication
Lassie	CBS	Syndication
Let's Make a Deal	ABC	Syndication
The Lawrence Welk Show	ABC	Syndication
The Road Runner Show	ABC	CBS

== Births ==
Date	Name	Notability
January 2	Taye Diggs	American actor (Private Practice)
January 7	Kevin Rahm	American actor (Judging Amy, Desperate Housewives, Mad Men)
January 7	Jeremy Renner	American actor (The Unusuals)
January 11	Mary J. Blige	American singer and actress
January 11	Rachelle Wilkos	American television producer
January 12	Jay Burridge	UK presenter (SMart)
January 13	Sarah Tansey	UK actress (Heartbeat)
January 15	Regina King	American actress (227, Southland, The Boondocks)
January 16	Jonathan Mangum	American actor
January 17	"Silk"	American conservative political commentator (Fox News, Newsmax TV)
January 19	Shawn Wayans	American actor (In Living Color, The Wayans Bros.)
January 19	Heather Bambrick	Canadian jazz singer
January 20	Pixie McKenna	Irish presenter (Embarrassing Bodies)
January 24	Kenya Moore	American actress
January 25	Ana Ortiz	American actress (Devious Maids, Home: Adventures with Tip and Oh)
January 26	Dorian Gregory	American actor (Charmed)
January 27	Guillermo Rodriguez	American talk show personality
February 1	Michael C. Hall	American actor (Six Feet Under, Dexter)
February 1	Hynden Walch	American actress (Chalkzone, Teen Titans, Adventure Time, Teen Titans Go!)
February 3	Jayne Middlemiss	UK presenter (Orange Playlist)
February 4	Trent Dawson	American actor (As the World Turns)
February 6	Brian Stepanek	American actor
February 8	Susan Misner	American actress
February 9	Sharon Case	American actress (The Young and the Restless)
February 12	Scott Menville	American actor (Teen Titans, Teen Titans Go!, Captain Planet and the Planeteers)
February 13	Galen Gering	American actor (Days of Our Lives)
February 15	Alex Borstein	American actress and comedian (Mad TV, Family Guy)
February 16	Amanda Holden	UK actress (Wild at Heart)
February 23	Melinda Messenger	British presenter, model (Live from Studio Five)
February 25	Sean Astin	American actor (Rudy, Special Agent Oso, Teenage Mutant Ninja Turtles) and son of Patty Duke
February 25	Jessica Yellin	American journalist
February 27	Charles Baker	American actor
March 2	Lisa Lackey	Australian actress (Heroes)
March 4	Shavar Ross	American actor (Diff'rent Strokes, Family Matters)
March 5	Yuri Lowenthal	American voice actor (Ben 10, Legion of Super Heroes, Naruto, Bleach)
March 9	Emmanuel Lewis	American actor (Webster)
March 9	Kinga Rusin	Polish news presenter
March 10	Jon Hamm	American actor (Mad Men)
March 11	Johnny Knoxville	American actor, host and stunt performer (Jackass)
March 13	Tracy Wells	American actress (Mr. Belvedere)
March 16	Alan Tudyk	American actor (Firefly, Dollhouse, Suburgatory, Star vs. the Forces of Evil)
March 20	Murray Bartlett	Australian actor (Guiding Light)
March 20	Alexander Chaplin	American actor (Spin City)
March 22	Keegan-Michael Key	American actor and comedian (Mad TV, Key & Peele, Playing House)
March 22	Will Yun Lee	American actor
March 24	Megyn Price	American actress (Grounded for Life, Rules of Engagement)
March 24	Tig Notaro	American actress
March 25	Randall Emmett	American film producer and television personality
March 27	Nathan Fillion	Canadian-American actor (Firefly, Two Guys and a Girl, Castle)
April 7	Tamala Edwards	American television news anchor and reporter
April 12	Nicholas Brendon	American actor (Buffy the Vampire Slayer, Criminal Minds)
April 12	Shannen Doherty	American actress (Beverly Hills, 90210, Charmed) (d. 2024)
April 14	Faith Salie	American actress
April 15	Andrew Daly	American actor and comedian (Mad TV, Review)
April 16	Peter Billingsley	Actor
April 17	Jim Acosta	American broadcast journalist
April 18	Fredro Starr	American rapper and actor (Moesha)
April 20	Brody Hutzler	American soap opera actor
April 28	Simbi Khali	American actress (Martin, 3rd Rock from the Sun)
April 28	Bridget Moynahan	American actress (Blue Bloods)
May 1	Shep	British dog actor (Blue Peter) (d. 1987)
May 6	Geneva Carr	American actress
May 7	Ivan Sergei	American actor (Charmed, Crossing Jordan)
May 12	Jamie Luner	American actress (Just the Ten of Us, Melrose Place)
May 14	Deanne Bray	American actress
May 26	Matt Stone	American writer and animator (South Park)
May 28	Marco Rubio	American politician and diplomat
May 30	John Ross Bowie	American actor (Speechless)
June 2	Anthony Montgomery	American actor (Star Trek: Enterprise)
June 4	Noah Wyle	American actor (ER, Falling Skies)
June 4	James Callis	English actor
June 5	Mark Wahlberg	American actor and producer (Entourage)
June 5	Emy Coligado	American actress (Malcolm in the Middle)
June 7	Brian Anderson	American sportscaster
June 8	Mark Feuerstein	American actor (Prison Break, Royal Pains)
June 10	Reinout Oerlemans	Actor
June 10	Taylor Armstrong	American television personality
June 15	Dana Bash	American journalist
June 15	Jake Busey	American actor
June 16	Tupac Shakur	American rapper and actor (d. 1996)
June 16	Eric Stangel	American writer
June 22	Mary Lynn Rajskub	American actress (24)
June 23	Ron Corning	American television host
June 25	Angela Kinsey	American actress (The Office)
June 28	Benito Martinez	American actor
June 29	Christina Chang	American actress
June 30	Monica Potter	American actress (Parenthood)
July 1	Julianne Nicholson	American actress (Law & Order: Criminal Intent)
July 1	Melissa Peterman	American actress (Reba)
July 3	Sway Calloway	American rapper
July 4	Koko	American sign language gorilla (d. 2018)
July 5	Sal Iacono	American comedian
July 7	Christian Camargo	American actor
July 8	Jason L. Riley	American conservative commentator
July 9	Dani Behr	English presenter, actress (I'm a Celebrity... Get Me out of Here!)
July 9	Scott Grimes	American actor (Party of Five, ER, American Dad!)
July 10	Erika Jayne	American singer
July 12	Kristi Yamaguchi	American professional ice skater (Dancing with the Stars winner)
July 15	Jim Rash	American actor (Community)
July 16	Corey Feldman	American actor
July 18	Penny Hardaway	NBA basketball player
July 20	Sandra Oh	Canadian actress (Grey's Anatomy)
July 23	Steven D. Binder	Screenwriter
July 23	Alison Krauss	Singer
July 23	Eugene Domingo	Actress
July 24	Patty Jenkins	American film director
July 26	Chris Harrison	American TV host
July 26	Dan Harris	American journalist
July 27	Eric Martsolf	American actor and singer (Passions, Days of Our Lives)
July 29	Bryan Dattilo	American actor (Days of Our Lives)
July 30	Tom Green	Canadian comedian (The Tom Green Show)
July 30	Christine Taylor	American actress (Hey Dude)
July 31	Eve Best	Actress
August 2	Sukanya Krishnan	American news anchor
August 6	Merrin Dungey	American actress (The King of Queens, Alias)
August 9	Kate Gerbeau	English presenter (Newsround)
August 10	Justin Theroux	American actor (The Leftovers)
August 10	Fábio Assunção	Actor
August 12	Michael Ian Black	American comedian and actor
August 12	Yvette Nicole Brown	American actress (Community)
August 12	Rebecca Gayheart	American actress
August 14	Rhonda Ross Kendrick	Actress
August 14	Raoul Bova	Actor
August 20	David Walliams	Actor
August 28	Daniel Goddard	Australian actor (The Young and the Restless)
August 29	Carla Gugino	American actress (Karen Sisco, Threshold)
August 29	Alex Young	American studio executive
August 31	Chris Tucker	American actor and comedian (Friday)
September 1	Ricardo Antonio Chavira	American actor (Desperate Housewives)
September 2	Lisa Snowdon	British presenter (Britain's Next Top Model)
September 2	Katt Williams	Stand-up comedian
September 8	Brooke Burke	Dancing with the Stars winner (season 7), co-host (seasons 10–17)
September 8	Martin Freeman	Actor
September 8	David Arquette	Actor
September 9	Natasha Kaplinsky	British presenter (Strictly Come Dancing winner)
September 9	Eric Stonestreet	American actor (Modern Family)
September 9	Henry Thomas	American actor
September 14	Kimberly Williams-Paisley	American actress (According to Jim)
September 15	Josh Charles	American actor (Sports Night, The Good Wife)
September 15	Colleen O'Shaughnessey	American actress
September 16	Amy Poehler	American actress (Saturday Night Live, The Mighty B!, Parks and Recreation)
September 17	Bobby Lee	American actor and comedian (Mad TV)
September 17	Nate Berkus	American television personality
September 18	Jada Pinkett Smith	American actress (Gotham)
September 19	Sanaa Lathan	American actress (The Cleveland Show)
September 21	Alfonso Ribeiro	American actor and host (Silver Spoons, The Fresh Prince of Bel-Air, America's Funniest Home Videos)
September 21	Luke Wilson	American actor (Enlightened)
September 21	Anne-Marie Green	Anchor
September 22	Adam Ciralsky	American journalist
September 23	Sean Spicer	Former White House Press Secretary (Dancing with the Stars, Newsmax TV)
September 25	Jessie Wallace	British actress (EastEnders)
September 25	Brian Dunkleman	Actor
September 27	Amanda Detmer	American actress
September 28	Liza Walker	British actress (Teenage Health Freak)
September 29	Emily Spivey	American actress
September 30	Jenna Elfman	American actress (Dharma & Greg)
October 1	Andrew O'Keefe	Australian television presenter
October 1	Chris Savino	Writer
October 5	Samuel Vincent	Canadian voice actor (Edd on Ed, Edd n Eddy)
October 6	Emily Mortimer	Actress
October 11	Justin Lin	Director
October 13	Sacha Baron Cohen	British comedian (Da Ali G Show)
October 13	Billy Bush	Television host
October 20	Snoop Dogg	American rapper and actor (Doggy Fizzle Televizzle)
October 20	Eddie Jones	NBA basketball player
October 22	Chris Licht	Producer
October 25	Leslie Grossman	American actress (Popular, What I Like About You)
October 25	Craig Robinson	American actor and comedian (The Office)
October 29	Winona Ryder	American actress
November 2	Meta Golding	Haitian-American actress (Criminal Minds)
November 5	Corin Nemec	American actor (Parker Lewis Can't Lose, Stargate SG-1)
November 5	Dana Jacobson	American host and correspondent
November 10	John Roberts	American actor (Bob's Burgers)
November 12	Rebecca Wisocky	American actress
November 15	Jay Harrington	American actor
November 17	David Ramsey	American actor (Dexter, Arrow)
November 20	Joel McHale	American actor (Phineas and Ferb, Community)
November 21	Michael Strahan	NFL football player and journalist
November 23	Vin Baker	NBA basketball player
November 23	Lisa Kushell	American comedian and actress (Mad TV)
November 23	Chris Hardwick	American comedian and actor (The X's, Back at the Barnyard, Talking Dead, Sanjay and Craig)
November 24	Lola Glaudini	American actress (The Sopranos, Criminal Minds)
November 25	Christina Applegate	American actress (Married... with Children, Samantha Who?)
November 25	"Diamond"	American conservative political commentator (Fox News, Newsmax TV) (d. 2023)
November 27	Kirk Acevedo	American actor (Oz, Band of Brothers, Fringe, 12 Monkeys)
November 29	Gena Lee Nolin	American actress and model (The Price is Right, Baywatch)
December 7	Stephanie D'Abruzzo	American actress
December 14	Tia Texada	American actress (Third Watch, The Unit)
December 14	Michaela Watkins	American actress (Saturday Night Live, Trophy Wife, Casual)
December 14	Natascha McElhone	British actress
December 25	Justin Trudeau	Canadian politician
December 26	Jared Leto	American actor (My So-Called Life)
December 27	Savannah Guthrie	American journalist
December 28	Ana Navarro	Nicaraguan-American political commentator (ABC News, CNN, Telemundo, The View)
December 30	Chris Vance	English actor (Prison Break)

== Deaths ==
Date	Name	Age	Notability
March 11	Philo Farnsworth	64	Television pioneer
March 16	Bebe Daniels	70	Actress (42nd Street)
August 27	Bennett Cerf	73	Publisher and game show panelist (What's My Line?)
December 12	David Sarnoff	80	Television pioneer
December 30	Melba Rae	49	Actress (Search for Tomorrow)
December 31	Pete Duel	31	Actor (Alias Smith and Jones)

== Television debuts ==
- Keith Carradine – Bonanza
- Robert Carradine – Bonanza
- Chevy Chase – The Great American Dream Machine
- Max Gail – Ironside
- Anna Magnani – The Automobile
- Andrea Martin – The Hart and Lorne Terrific Hour
- Sam Neill – The City of No
- Katey Sagal – The Failing of Raymond
- Mario Van Peebles – Crosscurrent
- James Woods – All the Way Home
- George Wyner – The Odd Couple
