= Charlotte's Shorts =

Live performance of Charlotte Dean's short stories

- Logo of Charlotte's Shorts
- Occupation: Live performance
- Years active: 2014-

Charlotte's Shorts is a 90 minute live performance of Charlotte Dean's short stories. The show has traditionally been cast with current and past Groundlings, such as Tim Bagley, Jim Rash, Jillian Bell, Jordan Black, Gary Anthony Williams, Jonathan Stark, Michael Hitchcock, Andrew Friedman, Daniele Gaither, Mindy Sterling, and Laraine Newman. In 2014, Charlotte's Shorts was performed at various theaters in Los Angeles, including two shows at The Groundlings Theater. Charlotte's Shorts is prominently featured in SF Sketchfest and The Hollywood Fringe Festival.
