= Charlotte Dean =

American writer and artist

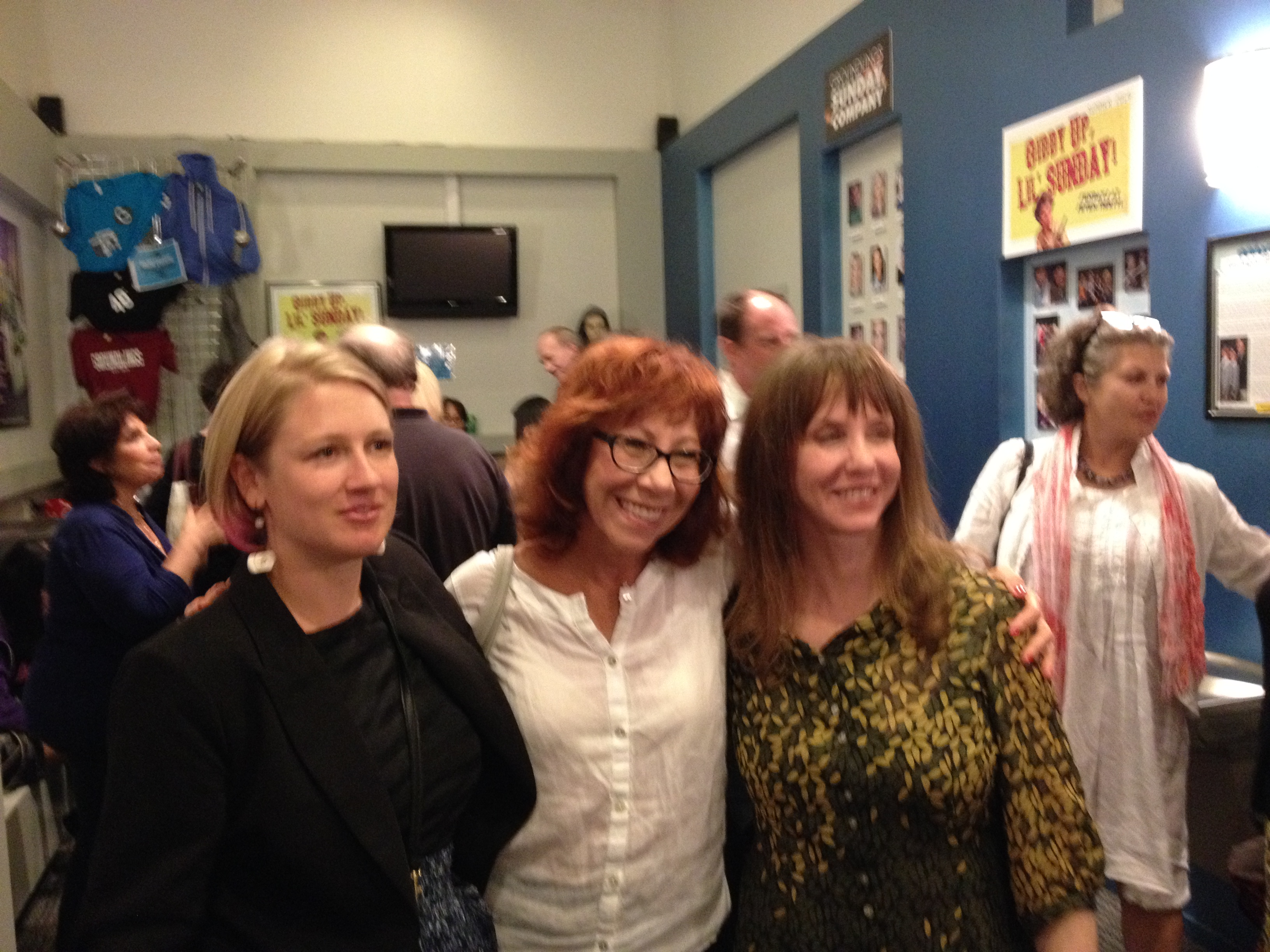
- Charlotte Dean (left) at the premiere of Charlotte's Shorts at The Groundlings, 2014
- Born: Charlotte Dean; California, United States
- Occupations: Writer; Director; Producer; Artist; Content Creator
- Years active: 2006–present
- Relatives: Tracy Newman (mother), Laraine Newman (aunt), Hannah Einbinder (cousin), Spike Einbinder (cousin)

Charlotte Dean is an American writer, illustrator, and visual artist known for writing and co-directing the show Charlotte's Shorts, along with Emmy award writer, director, and producer Tracy Newman.

== Early life and education ==
Dean grew up surrounded by the performing arts, spending much of her time as a child at the improvisational and sketch comedy troupe and school The Groundlings seeing her mother performing and teaching with the troupe formed by Gary Austin in 1974.

== Career ==
Dean began writing when she was a child, inspired by her father. After finishing high school she traveled to Mexico City, where she worked as a muralist and continued to write. Her visual artwork has been shown in Los Angeles, New York, Seattle, and Mexico City. Some of her work is part of the Ryan James Fine Arts gallery collection in Kirkland, Washington. She started her blog Charlotte's Shorts in 2008 while in France with her husband, Ro Reyes. In 2014, she made her short stories into a 90-minute show directed by Dean and her mother, Tracy Newman. The show's most recent production in Los Angeles was on June 17, 2025, at The Groundlings, Charlotte often features her aunt, Laraine Newman in the show. Charlotte's Shorts was also performed at the SF Sketchfest on January 31, 2015 and the Hollywood Fringe Festival in 2016.

== Personal life ==
Dean lives in Los Angeles, California with her husband. Together with her mother she runs a production company called Run Along Home Productions. Her son Logan was born in August 2017.
