= Hiller and Diller =

- Created by: Lowell Ganz; Babaloo Mandel
- Starring: Kevin Nealon; Richard Lewis; Jordan Baker; Allison Mack; Kyle Sabihy; Jillian Bernard; Faryn Einhorn; Jonathan Osser; Eugene Levy
- Composer: Ray Colcord
- Country of origin: United States
- Original language: English
- No. of seasons: 1
- No. of episodes: 16 (4 unaired)

Production
- Executive producers: Lowell Ganz; Babaloo Mandel; Tracy Newman; Jonathan Stark; Ron Howard; Brian Grazer; Tony Krantz
- Camera setup: Multi-camera
- Running time: 30 minutes
- Production companies: Imagine Television; Touchstone Television

Original release
- Network: ABC
- Release: September 23, 1997 – March 13, 1998

Hiller and Diller is an American sitcom that aired on ABC from September 23, 1997, to March 13, 1998.

== Premise ==
Ted and Neil are two comedy writers with very different lives. Ted has an overachieving daughter among his three children, while Neil has two troublesome teenagers.

== Cast ==
- Kevin Nealon as Ted Hiller
- Richard Lewis as Neil Diller
- Jordan Baker as Jeanne Hiller, Ted's wife
- Allison Mack as Brooke Diller, Neil's daughter
- Kyle Sabihy as Zane Diller, Neil's son
- Jillian Bernard as Allison Hiller, Ted & Jeanne's daughter
- Faryn Einhorn as Lizzie Hiller, Ted & Jeanne's daughter
- Jonathan Osser as Josh Hiller, Ted & Jeanne's son
- Eugene Levy as Gordon Schermerhorn

== Episodes ==
No.	Title	Directed by	Written by	Original release date	Prod. code
1	"Pilot"	Gil Junger	Lowell Ganz & Babaloo Mandel	September 23, 1997	001
Zane gets expelled from school, so Diller asks Hiller to help the boy get into the school where Hiller's daughter goes.
2	"The Play's the Thing"	Philip Charles MacKenzie	Alex Herschlag	September 30, 1997	004
Ted and Neil writes a paper for Zane and Lizzie, but the paper gets only a C+.
3	"The Anniversary"	Philip Charles MacKenzie	Tracy Newman & Jonathan Stark	October 7, 1997	003
Ted and Jeanne allows Neil to babysit so they can celebrate their anniversary at a hotel.
4	"The Old Flame"	Unknown	Unknown	October 14, 1997	005
Neil is dating Ted's former college girlfriend.
5	"Don't Make Me Hurt You"	Unknown	Unknown	October 21, 1997	006
When Neil is fired over creative differences, Ted decides to quit too and join him as a script writer for wrestling shows.
6	"A Very Special Episode of Hiller and Diller"	Unknown	Unknown	October 28, 1997	007
Neil implies that Jeanne isn't funny, so Ted bets Neil that she can get the dinner guests to laugh.
7	"Butterfly Kisses"	Unknown	Unknown	November 4, 1997	010
Lizzie forbids Ted from singing at her first boy-girl party.
8	"Hiller's List"	Unknown	Unknown	November 11, 1997	009
Ted plays matchmaker for Neil.
9	"Thankless-giving"	Unknown	Unknown	November 27, 1997	013
Jeanne lets Ted cook the holiday meal when Ted says he can cook just as good as she does.
10	"Christmas/Hanukkah"	Gil Junger	Alex Herschlag	December 16, 1997	012
Jeanne helps Gordon with an office party.
11	"The Cliffy Dukay Show"	Unknown	Unknown	December 23, 1997	008
Neil pressures Gordon into hiring a politically incorrect comedian.
12	"Zane and Lizzie"	Unknown	Unknown	March 6, 1998	014
Ted and Jeanne learns that Zane has a crush on Lizzie.
13	"Smart Guy"	Unknown	Unknown	March 13, 1998	016
Neil's son is picked to represent the school in a contest when he aces a math test.
14	"Jeanne Gets a Job"	TBD	TBD	Unaired	015
Ted wants the kid to be supportive when Jeannie applies for a job.
15	"Haircut"	TBD	TBD	Unaired	002
Ted doesn't know if Gordon plans to renew their contracts.
16	"Diller vs. Diller"	TBD	TBD	Unaired	011
Neil's first wife doesn't want him to keep the kids for a year.
