= Bob (TV series) =

American sitcom (1992–1993)

- Genre: Sitcom
- Created by: Bill and Cheri Steinkellner; Phoef Sutton
- Starring: Bob Newhart; Carlene Watkins; Cynthia Stevenson; Ruth Kobart; Timothy Fall; Andrew Bilgore; John Cygan; Betty White; Jere Burns; Megan Cavanaugh; Eric Allan Kramer
- Composer: Lee Holdridge
- Country of origin: United States
- Original language: English
- No. of seasons: 2
- No. of episodes: 33 (3 unaired)

Production
- Executive producers: Bill Steinkellner; Cheri Steinkellner; Phoef Sutton
- Camera setup: Multi-camera
- Running time: 30 minutes
- Production companies: Steinkellners & Sutton; Paramount Television

Original release
- Network: CBS
- Release: September 18, 1992 – December 27, 1993

Bob is an American sitcom television series created by Bill Steinkellner, Cheri Steinkellner, and Phoef Sutton. It aired on CBS from September 18, 1992, to December 27, 1993, for two seasons. The series was the third starring vehicle sitcom for Bob Newhart, following his previous successful CBS sitcoms The Bob Newhart Show and Newhart.

== Synopsis ==
=== First season ===
Newhart portrayed Bob McKay, the creator of the 1950s comic book superhero Mad-Dog. Mad-Dog was a casualty of the Comics Code Authority (CCA), a real-life self-regulation authority formed to assuage concerns over violence and gore in comics in the 1950s. In the wake of the CCA, Bob became a greeting card artist. In the pilot, Mad-Dog is revived when the American-Canadian Trans-Continental Communications Company buys the rights to the series. Complications ensue when Ace Comics head Harlan Stone (John Cygan) insists Mad-Dog should be a bloodthirsty vigilante rather than the hero Bob originally created. Bob initially turns down Harlan's offer to revive the series with the publisher, but after his wife, Kaye (Carlene Watkins), reminds Bob that Mad-Dog would never give up dreams in the face of defeat, he decides to compromise with Harlan on creative direction, and go back to do the revival. In the final episode of the first season, AmCanTranConComCo is sold to a millionaire who hates comic books, and the entire Mad-Dog staff, including Bob, is fired.

During the first season, Bob balances his work life with his personal life. Bob's wife Kaye is loyal and sensible, and a busy career woman herself. Their grown daughter, Trisha (Cynthia Stevenson), frequently bemoans her perpetually single state. At work, Bob has to deal with the more eccentric staff members: klutzy gofer Albie Lutz (Andrew Bilgore); spaced-out cartoon inker Chad Pfefferle (Timothy Fall); and curmudgeonly artist Iris Frankel (Ruth Kobart). Eventually, Bob also hires Trisha onto the Mad-Dog staff, where Chad develops a crush on her; she also moves into an apartment with her best friend, Kathy (Lisa Kudrow), where Albie also joins them temporarily.

=== Second season ===
When Bob returned in late October 1993, the show was changed completely. All of Bob's co-workers from the previous season disappeared and the show's premise had changed. Sylvia Schmitt (Betty White), the wife of his former boss (who had run off with his dental hygienist), hires Bob as President of Schmitt Greetings. Her son Pete (Jere Burns), the vice-president of Sales who had expected to take over the company and now has to work for Bob, is not happy. Others working at the company are the bookkeeper Chris Szelinski (Megan Cavanagh) and Whitey van der Bunt (Eric Allan Kramer), a member of the production team who adores Bob. Trisha and Kathy remain friends and housemates on a quest for true love.

== Cast ==
- Bob Newhart as Bob McKay, a greeting card artist who discovers a comic book he created is getting revived.
- Carlene Watkins as Kaye McKay, Bob's loyal, sensible wife with a career of her own.
- Cynthia Stevenson as Trisha McKay, Bob and Kaye's daughter, who frequently bemoans her single status.

=== Season one main cast ===
- Ruth Kobart as Iris Frankel, a curmudgeonly artist who worked with Bob in his early days. She still calls him "Bobby McKay".
- Timothy Fall as Chad Pfefferle, a spaced-out cartoon inker
- Andrew Bilgore as Albie Lutz, a klutzy gofer with low self-esteem
- John Cygan as Harlan Stone, the head of Ace Comics with whom Bob has frequent clashes

=== Season two main cast ===
- Betty White as Sylvia Schmitt, Bob's new boss
- Jere Burns as Pete Schmitt, Sylvia's son and the vice president of sales, who expected to have Bob's job
- Eric Allan Kramer as Whitey van der Bunt, a dim-witted member of the production team who is a fan of Bob's work
- Megan Cavanagh as Chris Szelinski, the sarcastic company bookkeeper

=== Recurring ===
- Lisa Kudrow as Kathy Fleisher, Trisha's best friend
- Tom Poston as Kathy's father, a fellow comic book writer alumnus who created "The Silencer". He only appears in season one.
- Dorothy Lyman as Patty Fleisher, Kathy's mother. She only appears in season one.
- Dick Martin as Buzz Loudermilk, a friend of Bob's and the creator of "Katie Carter, Army Nurse". In addition to this recurring role, Martin also directed several episodes of the series.
- Christine Dunford as Shayla, Harlan's on-and-off girlfriend. She only appears in season one.

One character was heard but not seen: Mr. Terhorst (voice of Michael Cumpsty), the president of AmCanTranConComCo, who communicates with all his employees anywhere that fiber optics can be installed. Harlan even provides Bob with a cellular phone, which Mr. Terhorst would randomly tap into and begin talking to Bob in his most private, intimate hours.

=== Notable guest stars ===
- Carol Ann Susi as Debra ("P.C. or Not P.C."). Susi and Newhart would both go on to be recurring guest stars on The Big Bang Theory.
- Bill Daily as Vic Victor, one of Bob's poker friends. Daily previously played Howard on The Bob Newhart Show, and said "Hi, Bob" whenever he showed up. ("A Streetcar Named Congress Douglas", "I'm Getting Remarried in the Morning")
- Steve Lawrence as Don Palmero, one of Bob's poker friends. ("A Streetcar Named Congress Douglas", "I'm Getting Remarried in the Morning")
- George Wendt and Bernadette Birkett as themselves ("Da Game")
- Mara Wilson as Amelia ("Have Yourself a Married Little Christmas")

The season one episode "You Can't Win" played upon the series' comic book connection by guest starring comic book artists Bob Kane, Jack Kirby, Mell Lazarus, Jim Lee, Marc Silvestri, Mel Keefer, Paul Power, Art Thibert and Sergio Aragones (co-creator of Groo with "Bob" scripter Mark Evanier.)

== Episodes ==
=== Series overview ===
Season	Episodes	Originally released	
Season	Episodes	First released	Last released
1	25	September 18, 1992	May 17, 1993
2	8	October 22, 1993	December 27, 1993

=== Season 1 (1992–93) ===
No. overall	No. in season	Title	Directed by	Written by	Original release date	Viewers (millions)
1	1	"Mad Dog Returns"	Andrew D. Weyman	Bill Steinkellner & Cheri Steinkellner & Phoef Sutton	September 18, 1992	17.0
2	2	"Drawing a Blank"	Michael Zinberg	Bill Steinkellner & Cheri Steinkellner & Phoef Sutton	September 25, 1992	17.9
3	3	"My Daughter, My Fodder"	Michael Zinberg	Don Seigel & Jerry Perzigian	October 2, 1992	15.3
4	4	"Penny for Your Thoughts"	Michael Zinberg	Bill Steinkellner & Cheri Steinkellner & Phoef Sutton	October 16, 1992	14.4
5	5	"Terminate Her"	Dick Martin	Bill Steinkellner & Cheri Steinkellner & Phoef Sutton	October 23, 1992	14.1
6	6	"P.C. or Not P.C."	Michael Zinberg	Bill Steinkellner & Cheri Steinkellner & Phoef Sutton	October 30, 1992	12.1
7	7	"A Streetcar Named Congress-Douglas"	Michael Zinberg	Bill Steinkellner & Cheri Steinkellner & Phoef Sutton	November 6, 1992	12.7
8	8	"Unforgiven"	Michael Zinberg	Bill Steinkellner & Cheri Steinkellner & Phoef Sutton	November 13, 1992	13.0
9	9	"Mad Dog on 34th Street"	Michael Zinberg	Bill Steinkellner & Cheri Steinkellner & Phoef Sutton	November 20, 1992	13.3
10	10	"Stone in Love"	Michael Zinberg	Bill Steinkellner & Cheri Steinkellner & Phoef Sutton	December 4, 1992	13.6
11	11	"The Lost Episode"	Michael Zinberg	Tracy Newman & Jonathan Stark	December 11, 1992	10.5
12	12	"A Christmas Story"	Michael Zinberg	Bill Steinkellner & Cheri Steinkellner & Phoef Sutton	December 21, 1992	20.1
13	13	"La Sorpresa"	Michael Zinberg	Don Seigel & Jerry Perzigian	January 8, 1993	14.0
14	14	"Bob and Kaye and Jerry and Patty"	Michael Zinberg	Bill Steinkellner & Cheri Steinkellner & Phoef Sutton	January 22, 1993	11.7
15	15	"You Can't Win"	Michael Zinberg	Bill Steinkellner & Cheri Steinkellner & Phoef Sutton	January 29, 1993	N/A
16	16	"Da Game"	Michael Zinberg	Bill Steinkellner & Cheri Steinkellner & Phoef Sutton	February 5, 1993	14.2
17	17	"The Man Who Killed Mad Dog"	Michael Zinberg	Mark Evanier	February 12, 1993	14.0
18	18	"The Phantom of AmCanTranConComCo"	Dick Martin	Bill Steinkellner & Cheri Steinkellner & Phoef Sutton	March 5, 1993	11.9
19	19	"The Man Who Broke the Bank at Our Lady of Constant Sorrow"	Michael Zinberg	Bill Steinkellner & Cheri Steinkellner & Phoef Sutton	March 12, 1993	13.3
20	20	"I'm Getting Re-Married in the Morning"	Michael Zinberg	Cheri Steinkellner & Bill Steinkellner & Phoef Sutton	April 12, 1993	16.8
21	21	"Tell Them Willy Mammoth Is Here"	Michael Zinberg	Don Seigel & Jerry Perzigian	April 19, 1993	14.6
22	22	"Death of an Underwear Salesman"	Michael Zinberg	Tracy Newman & Jonathan Stark	April 26, 1993	13.9
23	23	"The Entertainer"	Michael Zinberg	Tracy Newman & Jonathan Stark	May 3, 1993	15.0
24	24	"Neighborhood Watch"	Michael Zinberg	Bill Steinkellner & Cheri Steinkellner & Phoef Sutton	May 10, 1993	13.6
25	25	"Oh Where, Oh Where Has My Mad-Dog Gone?"	Michael Zinberg	Bill Steinkellner & Cheri Steinkellner & Phoef Sutton	May 17, 1993	18.3

=== Season 2 (1993) ===
No. overall	No. in season	Title	Directed by	Written by	Original release date	Viewers (millions)
26	1	"Greetings"	Hal Cooper	Bill Steinkellner & Cheri Steinkellner & Phoef Sutton	October 22, 1993	10.8
27	2	"For Pete's Sake"	Hal Cooper	Tracy Newman & Jonathan Stark	October 29, 1993	10.0
28	3	"Whose Card Is It Anyway?"	Hal Cooper	Don Seigel & Jerry Perzigian	November 5, 1993	7.6
29	4	"Speechless in Chicago"	Hal Cooper	Tracy Newman & Jonathan Stark	November 12, 1993	8.3
30	5	"Kiss and Sell"	Dick Martin	Tracy Newman & Jonathan Stark	December 27, 1993	17.8
31	6	"Michiana Moon"	Peter Baldwin	Don Seigel & Jerry Perzigian	Unaired	N/A
32	7	"Have Yourself a Married Little Christmas"	Peter Baldwin	Don Seigel & Jerry Perzigian	Unaired	N/A
33	8	"Better to Have Loved and Flossed"	Dick Martin	David Lloyd	Unaired	N/A

== Production ==
In a rarity for TV sitcoms of the time, Bob was filmed with a video assist for the directors and producers to monitor the show during filming. All the artwork in season one was done by storyboard artist Paul Power, who also appears as an extra in most of the comics studio scenes.

== Home media ==
On April 3, 2012, CBS DVD (distributed by Paramount) released Bob: The Complete Series on DVD in Region 1.

== Mad-Dog comic book ==
As part of the promotion of this series, Marvel Comics published a six-issue "Mad Dog" limited series. The title was presented "flip-book" style, with a Silver Age style story by Ty Templeton on one side and a Modern Age style tale on the other side with work by Evan Dorkin and Gordon Purcell. Dorkin said the series was one of the worst things he has ever written, and Templeton said his time on the series was one of his favorite professional experiences.

The Silver Age stories were credited to Bob McKay, and the Modern Age stories were credited with a thanks to Harlan Stone.
