= Big John Hamilton (actor) =

American restaurateur and actor (1916–1984)

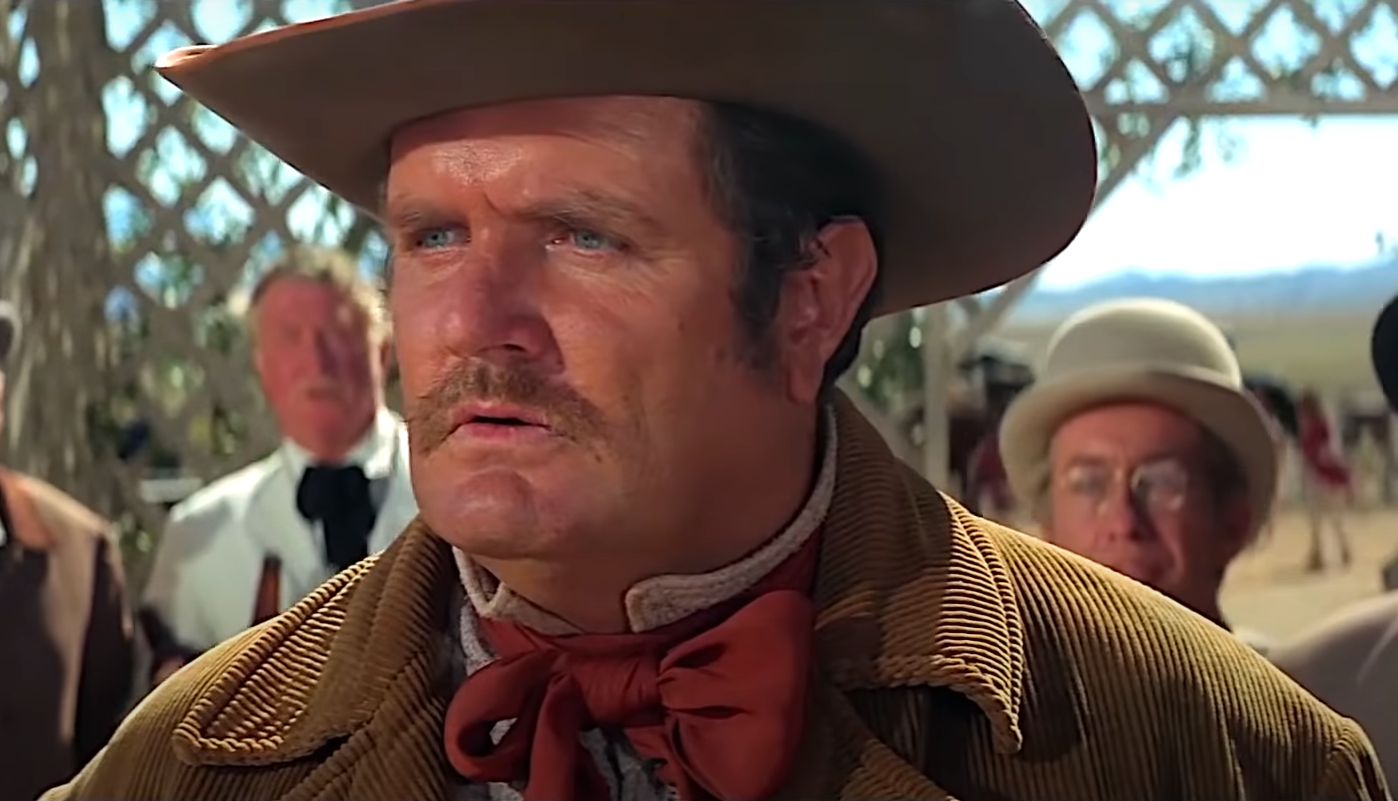
- Hamilton in McLintock! (1963)
- Born: October 29, 1916; Asheville, North Carolina, U.S.
- Died: December 5, 1984 (aged 68); San Antonio, Texas, U.S.
- Occupations: Actor; restaurateur
- Years active: 1956–1983

Big John Hamilton (October 29, 1916 – December 5, 1984) was an American restaurateur and actor known for various small roles in American films, especially western films. He had roles in several John Wayne films.

Hamilton, who was born in Asheville, North Carolina, was 6-ft 4-in tall and owned a steak house in San Antonio where he met Wayne and was offered a small, uncredited role in The Alamo. He continued to have roles in other Wayne films and a few other films and guest appearances on several television series.

He died of an apparent heart attack at Brooke Army Medical Center in San Antonio on December 5, 1984.

== Filmography ==
Year	Title	Role	Notes
1956	Gunsmoke	Big John	Episode: "Poor Pearl"
1957	Blondie	Wildcat	Episode: "Howdy Neighbor"
1958	Mackenzie's Raiders	Lane	Episode: "Hostage"
1960	The Alamo	Bowie's Man	Uncredited
1961	Two Rode Together	Settler	Uncredited
1961	The Deadly Companions	Gambler	Uncredited
1963	Bonanza	Miner	Episode: "Calamity Over the Comstock"
1963	McLintock!	Fauntleroy Sage	
1966	The Rounders	Big John	Episode: "Some Things Are Not for Sale"
1968	Bandolero!	Bank customer	
1968	Hellfighters	Lipman	
1969	The Undefeated	Mudlow	
1974	The Sugarland Express	Big John	
1974	Ride in a Pink Car	Big John	
1978	Flying High	Big John	Episode: "South by Southwest"
1983	Tough Enough	Big John	(final film role)
