= List of The Commish episodes =

The Commish is an American comedy-drama television series that aired on ABC. The series focuses on the work and home life of a suburban police commissioner (Michael Chiklis) in upstate New York. It ran for five seasons from 1991 to 1996, airing 94 episodes.

== Series overview ==
Season	Episodes	Originally released	
Season	Episodes	First released	Last released
1	22	September 28, 1991	May 16, 1992
2	22	September 26, 1992	May 15, 1993
3	22	September 25, 1993	May 14, 1994
4	22	September 24, 1994	May 20, 1995
5	6	November 30, 1995	January 11, 1996

== Episodes ==
=== Season 1 (1991–92) ===
No. overall	No. in season	Title	Original release date	U.S. viewers (millions)
1	1	"In the Best of Families"	September 28, 1991	11.9
Tony and Rachel consider buying a new home in an exclusive area of town. After being arrested by Ricky and Carmela on a possible DUI, the son of a wealthy and well-connected attorney dies in police custody, but the attorney refuses to accept either his son's life in a rough part of town or that his death was a suicide. Stan tries to solve a series of convenience store robberies. Tony learns how the young suspect got the belt with which he hanged himself in his holding cell and that the boy was blackmailed over his law school failure, which may have driven him to end his own life.
2	2	"Do You See What I See?"	October 5, 1991	11.4
A man in a Santa Claus mask is committing home invasions. Worried about his fitness, Tony volunteers to partner up with different officers on night patrol – and gets a surprise or three while learning night patrol isn't quite what he remembered from his years as a Brooklyn beat officer.
3	3	"The Poisoned Tree"	October 12, 1991	13.7
Tony discovers one of Rachel's colleagues, a popular and much-honoured teacher, is a child molester. Stan tries to catch a robber who left his hat at the scene. Tony scrambles to get ballet tickets in time for Rachel's birthday while also learning about the molester's own childhood abuse and trying to convince the parents of one of the molester's victims to let their daughter tell her story in court.
4	4	"Nothing to Fear But..."	October 26, 1991	10.4
Tony receives anonymous, artistic death threats, seemingly from a convict he'd helped to convict. Stan tries to prosecute a deer poacher with failed results until protests outside the department building give Tony an idea. Rachel's special-needs class gives a poetry reading. Tony learns the hard way it wasn't the convict sending him the death threats.
5	5	"A Matter of Life or Death, Part 1"	November 2, 1991	11.8
Two of Tony's officers are found dead. Tony is interviewing for a job as the New York City Police Commissioner. Tony and Rachel are trying to conceive a second child.
6	6	"A Matter of Life or Death, Part 2"	November 2, 1991	11.8
Conclusion of the pilot episode.
7	7	"Behind the Storm Door"	November 9, 1991	11.4
An attractive woman reporting a break-in gives inconsistent information, then starts coming on to Tony. To impress a pretty neighbor, Stan pretends to fix her parking tickets. Jeff stops showering.
8	8	"The Hatchet"	November 16, 1991	12.6
A budget-cutting expert takes aim at the Eastbridge P.D. Tony suspects a new officer of police brutality. Stan races the new officer to find and bust a crack house. David is acting moody.
9	9	"Two Confessions"	November 30, 1991	12.8
Two twin brothers stymie a murder investigation by both confessing. Tony and Rachel get a $500 phone bill because of calls to a sex chat line. Carmela wants more respect from Stan. Arnie departs.
10	10	"The Commissioner's Ball"	December 7, 1991	12.6
A mysterious killer is hunting homeless people. Lucille moves the furniture in Tony's office. Tony invents new shooting drills, and gets stuck with the task of organizing the annual commissioner's ball.
11	11	"No Greater Gift"	December 21, 1991	11.4
Christmas episode. An elderly woman is shot to death. The president of the City Council pressures Tony to evict a homeless woman from a holiday manger display. Tony cooks pasta for the department.
12	12	"The Fourth Man"	January 4, 1992	15.6
Four truck hijackers plague Eastbridge's back roads, and Irv insists on leading the investigation. Gophers plague Tony's yard, and teenagers plague a hardware store parking lot. Rachel conceives a child.
13	13	"Charlie Don't Surf"	January 18, 1992	15.9
A Vietnamese gang called Charlie Don't Surf extorts a Vietnamese restaurant. Stan goes under cover as a pizza delivery boy. David is unimpressed by Tony's baseball card collection.
14	14	"Skeletons"	February 8, 1992	14.4
Tony teams up with his old friend Paulie Pantangeli (John Cygan) to solve a murder committed in 1957. A delusional man reports a missing child. Arnie sends honeymoon videos to Tony and Rachel.
15	15	"The Wicked Flee"	February 22, 1992	15.2
A wealthy woman is bludgeoned to death on the highway in front of her husband and son. Tony gets basketball-coaching advice from Wilt Chamberlain. An officer is bowling on the job.
16	16	"True Believers"	February 29, 1992	14.0
When a prominent white supremacist is murdered, suspicion falls on some of Tony's officers. Tony loses a ring by attaching it to balloons which float away. Stan issues licenses to psychics.
17	17	"Officer April"	March 7, 1992	13.2
When a woman fires a gun in a domestic dispute, Stan shoots her to death and her abusive husband tries to push for Stan's prosecution. Invoking the laws of "Tonyland," Tony detains an ill-mannered Cuban envoy. Officers jockey for monthly positioning posing for a "hot cops" calendar.
18	18	"Sex, Lies, and Kerosene"	March 21, 1992	17.8
A house burns down with a man's body inside; sexual intrigue ensues when his partner is discovered in an affair with his wife . . . but his death proves to be slightly exaggerated. An old woman's son steals her teeth. A pawn shop owner rips off Lucille and Tony and Rachel devise a plot to put him out of business.
19	19	"Judgement Day"	April 4, 1992	14.8
Tony gets a tip from a stool pigeon about a string of robberies, but ends up jailed by an antagonistic judge (whom Tony once called derisively Your Royal Highness) after seeking a warrant---unaware at first that the judge himself is being blackmailed. Carmela takes a young hoodlum (James Madio) under her wing. The resolution of the robberies moves the judge to a fateful decision.
20	20	"Shoot the Breeze"	May 2, 1992	14.6
An assassin hunts arms dealers to hide their supplier, and federal agents seem bent on interfering with Tony's bid to put away their localised mastermind. Tony and Rachel compete in the Eastbridge Talent Show. Stan hits it off with a lady he meets at the grocery store---who turns out to be in the arms dealing up to her neck. A rabbit goes missing in police headquarters.
21	21	"Video Vigilante"	May 9, 1992	15.5
A female college student is beaten into a coma. A "video vigilante" becomes a dangerous media sensation. Stan and Carmela pose as two fences getting married. (Guest: Titus Welliver.)
22	22	"The Puck Stops Here"	May 16, 1992	13.3
After going straight, a high school hockey star dies of a mysterious drug overdose. Medical tests suggest that Rachel's unborn baby may be intellectually disabled. Tony and Paulie first suspect the hockey star's brother but then discover his own coach may be involved in his death. Men in chicken suits fight in a parking lot. David assures Tony and Rachel there's enough love in their home to make even a disabled baby comfortable and secure.

=== Season 2 (1992–93) ===
No. overall	No. in season	Title	Original release date	U.S. viewers (millions)
23	1	"Adventures in the Skin Trade, Part 1"	September 26, 1992	16.6
Tony's friend's teenage daughter, Lisa, disappears from her parents' house, and appears in porn movies. The case begins when her angry father attacks her first photographer and ransacks his studio. Tony and Paulie go to New York City to find Lisa. A man gets killed in a traffic accident.
24	2	"Adventures in the Skin Trade, Part 2"	October 3, 1992	15.8
Tony escapes from murderous porn producers with the help of Cyd Madison (Melinda McGraw), an undercover FBI agent. He also discovers the source of Lisa's entry into the porn world---her boyfriend, which will shatter her father who took the young man under his wing. Tony and Rachel go to Lamaze class. Freddie's giant brothers help out. The resolution of Lisa's kidnapping leads to Paulie leaving the Eastbridge force---and to Tony hiring now-unemployed Cyd to succeed him as chief of Eastbridge detectives.
25	3	"Guns & Sons"	October 10, 1992	14.9
David witnesses his friend Jason shoot the school bully, Brad, who extorts money from them and other students and has a history of disciplinary issues at the school. The bully's thuggish father---who distrusts the police and intimidated the school principal out of further disciplining his reckless son---implicitly threatens further violence to Tony and to the school, while David is torn between keeping his promise to his friend and telling his father what he really knows. A rollerblading purse snatcher evades arrest, so the police work on their skating. Tony manages to avoid forcing a full school closure while solving the bully's shooting, leading to a heart-to-heart talk with David about when the rare occasions when it's appropriate to break a promise.
26	4	"The Rolodex Madam"	October 24, 1992	12.9
Carmela is mistaken for a cop-themed prostitute. The investigation leads to a well-heeled madam whose prominent clients include a Member of Congress---and whose retaliations include implying Tony was one of her clients in a blackmail attempt. Rachel meets an equally nervous Cyd uncomfortably. The Wortzels move in next door, and the husband's nocturnal yodeling drives the Scalis crazy---though David seems to have a crush on their pretty teenage daughter. Tony passes a polygraph to prove he wasn't a client---but the madam is found murdered, leading to a frantic attempt to cover up by the Congressman and the locals to whose charitable endeavours she was a prominent donor. A card missing from her Rolodex may hold the key to the crime.
27	5	"The Witches of Eastbridge"	October 31, 1992	14.7
Halloween episode. Someone steals a heart from a corpse; suspicion falls on a mysteriously eccentric old man (Ray Walston) who's also suspected of poisoning Halloween candy. Stan gets trapped in the morgue. David throws a party and the old man is invited by Tony. The real poison candy culprit surprises Tony.
28	6	"The Two Faces of Ed"	November 7, 1992	15.2
An arrogant radio psychologist (Pat Sajak) is choked nearly to death in his car. Tony and Rachel fail a marriage quiz, and try to help their newly-separated friend, Ed. Bill's police reports have typos.
29	7	"Escape"	November 14, 1992	15.7
An inmate kills a prison guard and escapes, bent on killing Phil, the Eastbridge officer who put him away. When Phil and the escaped convict turn up dead in separate incidents, suspicion falls upon Phil's wife, who has a broken arm she can't or won't really account for. Meanwhile, Rachel hires a decorator to remake the house with results ranging from amusing to annoying. The dead convict proves not to have killed Phil, sending Tony toward a suspect he can't bear to consider.
30	8	"A Time to Be Born"	November 21, 1992	16.2
Tony's mentor Lou is getting too old to chase criminals up stairs. Lou fails a department medical exam and must retire, depressing him enough to send him to a ledge where Tony, quietly but desperately, tries to talk him off. Cyd takes Rachel to the hospital to give birth. Tony lobbies the mayor for a new streetlight and accepts a slightly extreme suggestion to push the point. Baby Sarah is born to the Scalis---completely healthy.
31	9	"Witness"	December 5, 1992	14.6
Rachel sees a man rob a grocery store and kill the owner; the killer gets her purse with her contact information, and warns her not to identify him. Mike tries to woo Cyd with danish and exercise books.
32	10	"Sleep of the Just"	December 12, 1992	17.7
A serial rapist turns out to be an ambassadorial undersecretary from an unspecified Eastern Bloc country, with diplomatic immunity. Baby Sarah is keeping the family up at night. Rachel's father visits.
33	11	"The Frame"	December 19, 1992	16.2
Telly Savalas plays Tommy Colette, a mob boss who relocates to Eastbridge with ostensible plans to begin a waterfront business---and to buy off a crucial waterfront inspector for his permits. Tony's friend's son (Martin Cummins) is framed for a murder. The Wortzels drop hints about Christmas gifts, while David thinks their daughter, on whom he has a crush, feels the same way about him.
34	12	"Stoned"	January 2, 1993	18.2
Tony buys a new car for Rachel, and promptly gets carjacked. A serial impersonator (Steve Hytner) is on the loose. Tony goes to the hospital with kidney stones, where he befriends a terminally ill boy.
35	13	"The Heart is a Lonely Sucker"	January 16, 1993	17.4
A murderous robber steals rare antiques, after finding victims -- that all look like Tony -- through a video dating service. Hence, Tony signs up, which doesn't amuse Rachel. Carmela is cursed by a psychic. Tony discovers the hard way who the murdering robber really is.
36	14	"The Sharp Pinch"	February 6, 1993	17.7
A lactose-intolerant baby is stolen from his mother’s living room; Tony races against the clock to get him back. David's headed to D.C. on a field trip.
37	15	"Dead Cadet's Society"	February 13, 1993	13.9
A group of prep school boys called "The Cadets" commit a robbery; one (Scott Wolf) is caught. To prevent him from snitching, the others throw him off a bridge---or so it seems. Carmela catches David skipping school. Stan goes undercover at the prep school but The Cadets eventually discover his real identity and hold him hostage.
38	16	"Family Business"	February 20, 1993	16.5
Tommy Collette (Savalas) teams up with his temperamental, often reckless son Nick (Jay Acovone) to smuggle diamonds under the guise of seafood importing. David and his mulleted friend bemoan their lack of muscles. Rachel has a secret admirer. After one of the local seafood executives doing business with the Collettes is found murdered, Tony and Cyd find his sister for help, but Nick is actually holding them hostage intending to kill them for recordings the executive made secretly.
39	17	"Out of Business"	February 27, 1993	16.8
Nick's death trying to kill Tony and Cyd prompts two of his men to kidnap David Scali. Rachel demands Tony end his police career after David should be recovered. Tommy Collette returns David unharmed and plans to kill Tony using the survivor of Nick's men as bait. Carmela and Mike deal with a peeping Tom. Tommy's estranged daughter confronts her father about what his past cost her but refuses to help Tony by betraying her father. Cyd and her fellow officers scramble when Tommy intercepts and snatches Tony en route a meeting with the survivor among Nick's henchmen. Rachel changes her mind after the case is resolved.
40	18	"The Ides of March"	March 13, 1993	20.0
The psychic who found Tony’s ring in “True Believers” returns with a dire prognostication about Tony’s anniversary dinner. A man (Mark Pellegrino) holds his estranged wife hostage.
41	19	"Blue Flu"	April 1, 1993	15.7
Facing a possible pay cut, several officers call in sick. Men in ski masks commit home robberies. Rachel attends a high school reunion with a wealthy, single ex-boyfriend.
42	20	"Eastbridge Boulevard"	May 1, 1993	12.5
One of Tony's favorite movie stars as a child (Stella Stevens) is now a recluse who awakens to find her lover murdered beside her. A Cops-style reality show films Stan and Carmela as they go on patrol.
43	21	"Sight Unseen"	May 8, 1993	14.2
A serial rapist attacks women at a school for the blind; Carmela goes under cover as a student. Rachel buys a painting that Tony hates, until someone tries to steal it.
44	22	"The Anti-Commish"	May 15, 1993	15.8
A thug kills a drug addict and intimidates the sole witness out of testifying, only to be killed in turn by a mysterious vigilante. Rachel gets a job offer in Buffalo. A turkey shoots Gordy's dog.

=== Season 3 (1993–94) ===
No. overall	No. in season	Title	Directed by	Written by	Original release date	U.S. viewers (millions)
45	1	"Suffer the Children: Part 1"	James Whitmore, Jr.	Story by : Anthony J. Schembri & Stephen Kronish; Teleplay by : Stephen Kronish	September 25, 1993	16.4
After finding a teen runaway hanged, Tony investigates a cult-like youth shelter ruled by charismatic Steve Ennis (Ted Shackelford) who has the press and the mayor on his side. Rachel is offered a job fashioning a curriculum as well as teaching disabled children in Buffalo for more money and influence. Joey (Giovanni Ribisi) seems torn between his loyalty to Steve and his willingness to help Tony and let Tony help him. With Tony's slightly reluctant encouragement, Rachel accepts the Buffalo job. Tony thinks he may find a key to the runaway's suicide and the death she claimed responsibility for on a rural retreat Steve owns.
46	2	"Suffer the Children: Part 2"	James Whitmore, Jr.	Story by : Anthony J. Schembri & Stephen Kronish; Teleplay by : Stephen Kronish	October 2, 1993	16.0
Steve (Shackelford) threatens major litigation against the city unless Tony drops the investigation, but Tony presses forward and continues uncovering critical clues. Joey (Ribisi) emerges as a key witness after Steve deceives him. Rachel doesn't enjoy her new job. Tony invents a "three light" to back off a persistent complainer whose complaints have little substance. Circumstantial evidence continues piling up until with Joey's help Tony discovers the keys to Steve's crimes. Visiting in Buffalo, Tony learns Rachel decided to leave her job and return to Eastbridge---which provides an unexpected problem for Tony.
47	3	"Scali, P.I."	Rob Hedden	Robert Cochran	October 9, 1993	16.5
Having resigned as commissioner to join Rachel in Buffalo but learning she left her job, too, the Scalis return to Eastbridge to find Tony's successor in place: popular, politically conscious James Hayden (Mike Connors), whom the image-obsessed mayor loves but whom nobody realises is secretly a mob boss. Tony takes a job as a private investigator and inadvertently trips onto the new commissioner's criminal activities.
48	4	"Burned Out Case"	Paul Shapiro	David Ehrman	October 16, 1993	15.7
David's high school crush smokes tainted crack and drops dead at a school dance. Tony butts heads with the DEA over prosecuting her dealer. Stan, John, and Mike go under cover as fast food workers.
49	5	"The Set-Up"	Sara Jane Rose	Joel Surnow	October 23, 1993	14.4
A mobster tries to extort Tony by having a woman dressed in Rachel's clothes abduct her and hit a man with her car. Women find a pudgy federal agent attractive.
50	6	"Rising Sun"	Rachel Feldman	Story by : Eric Estrin & Michael Berlin; Teleplay by : Michael Berlin & Eric Estrin and Stephen Kronish	November 6, 1993	12.7
With a Japanese firm seeking City Council approval for a factory in Eastbridge, Tony's friend on the council (Ernest Borgnine) is beaten by hired thugs. David's schoolmates steal corsages from a flower store.
51	7	"Hero"	Gus Trikonis	David Greenwalt	November 13, 1993	16.4
The high school’s star quarterback Jack Hayes rapes the Scali family’s babysitter, Carla, but Jack's domineering father (Bo Svenson)---unaware his son really doesn't like football---proves an obstruction to the investigation and Tony is harassed by locals more concerned with the football team's advance to the state finals. Stan is embarrassed when his girlfriend Monica wins a bar fight on his behalf. Jack's father buys off Carla's mother to suppress the probe.
52	8	"Dying Affection"	Rachel Feldman	Evan Katz	November 20, 1993	15.2
After she dumps her boyfriend (Kevin Sorbo), Cyd starts receiving creepy, threatening packages. Stan links two elderly ladies to a notorious bank robber. Tony is vexed by David's terrible drum playing. Cyd's former boyfriend may not be the one harassing and threatening her.
53	9	"All That Glitters"	Jefferson Kibbee	Robert Rabinowitz	November 27, 1993	17.3
Stan's fiancée Monica abruptly disappears, then resurfaces as a suspect in a jewelry store robbery. Cyd busts a charming stolen-goods merchant (Dirk Benedict). Rachel puts the family on a health food diet. Monica's innocence may not be enough for Stan to trust her again.
54	10	"Mansion"	Mike Finney	Evan Katz	December 4, 1993	15.9
Wealthy Carter Wallace (Charles Frank) suppresses his dead wife's autopsy; also suspicious are their jaded children who endlessly hang out in discothèques, and the butler. Baby Sarah unwittingly makes several irresponsible online purchases after David sets up a computer program to help Tony and Rachel manage their finances. Tony and Cyd's investigation into the Wallace case turns up surprising revelations and another murder, when the butler attempts to bring Tony crucial evidence. Wallace may be covering up for his children.
55	11	"A Little Heart"	Rob Hedden	David Greenwalt	December 18, 1993	17.3
Someone steals a heart that Jeff's daughter needs as a transplant. Tony pays the ransom with money that Alex the DA (Richard Kind) needs as evidence. A bell-ringing Santa robs rich women.
56	12	"Benny"	Barbara Amato	Joel Surnow	January 15, 1994	17.0
Rachel's car-salesman cousin Benny collaborates with a murderous cocaine dealer, then goes under cover to redeem himself. A guy at the station named Brad refuses to help anyone out. Tony turns 40.
57	13	"Keeping Secrets"	Miles Watkins	Story by : Larry Barber & Paul Barber; Teleplay by : Stephen Kronish	January 22, 1994	13.9
Masked thugs are savagely beating gay men in the street, and a gay officer receives hostility from other cops when he comes out. David is doing an older girl’s homework for her.
58	14	"Dog Days"	Bruce Kessler	Story by : David Ehrman; Teleplay by : Robert Cochran	February 5, 1994	16.6
Dog snatchers kill a woman by injecting her with PCP in an alley. The only witness (Chris Burke) is mocked in court because he has Down syndrome. Joey Sanderson bamboozles a lie detector test.
59	15	"Father Eddie"	David Greenwalt	Story by : David Greenwalt & Joel Surnow; Teleplay by : David Greenwalt	February 12, 1994	14.7
The mystery of a murdered young woman leads to a street-tough Irish Catholic priest (Gerald McRaney) and his Puerto Rican protege. David sees his upcoming Bar Mitzvah as a money-making scheme.
60	16	"Bank Job"	Bruce Kessler	Evan Katz	February 26, 1994	15.2
A ruthless armed robber (Jeff Kober) takes over the local bank, with ten hostages inside including Rachel.
61	17	"Romeo and Juliet"	James Whitmore, Jr.	Joel Surnow	March 12, 1994	15.0
Suddenly David has a girlfriend, but Tony forbids him to see her because her father is a murderous bookmaker. David and the girl hide out in a warehouse together and work on his Bar Mitzvah speech.
62	18	"Security"	Unknown	Unknown	March 19, 1994	17.8
An apartment building suffers excessive crime, and hires an intense ex-Army security guard who dispenses lethal vigilante justice. Rachel's deeply unreliable father promises to take her to the circus.
63	19	"Dead Drunk"	Unknown	Unknown	April 2, 1994	17.9
An alcoholic doctor drives drunk and kills an officer's wife, but only gets a suspended sentence -- causing the officer to lose his mind. Various foods go missing from the Scali house.
64	20	"The Letter of the Law"	Unknown	Unknown	April 30, 1994	14.0
A mother who helps stop a purse-snatcher is revealed to be a fugitive from her ex-husband (Mark Moses), who sexually abused their daughter. A struggling actor is grateful when Tony saves his life.
65	21	"Sergeant Kelly"	Unknown	Unknown	May 7, 1994	15.5
Gunning for sergeant, Stan investigates a mobster named Terry Ross, and falls in love with Ross's kept, abused wife (Leah Remini) -- putting him in mortal peril. Cyd speaks at Rachel's school.
66	22	"The Iceman Cometh"	Unknown	Unknown	May 14, 1994	17.1
Sentenced to life without parole for Stan's murder, Ross orders Tony's death from prison, hiring an elderly but deadly assassin called the Iceman (Brian Keith).

=== Season 4 (1994–95) ===
No. overall	No. in season	Title	Original release date	U.S. viewers (millions)
67	1	"Against the Wind, Part 1"	September 24, 1994	15.6
Paralyzed by the Iceman's bullet, Tony struggles to walk again with the help of an ex-detective physical therapist named Dan. A cop gets murdered due to mafia intrigue. Cyd gets offered another job.
68	2	"Against the Wind, Part 2"	October 1, 1994	15.4
Conclusion; last appearance of Melinda McGraw as Cyd.
69	3	"Working Girls"	October 8, 1994	15.0
Tony's widowed friend's "bad girl" teen daughter (Devon Odessa) gets caught in a prostitution sting, but her father refuses to believe his daughter has gone that route; later, her pimp is found murdered. David steals cable to watch certain programming on channels his parents can't afford to add to their television service. Tony interviews for Cyd's replacement with results between hilarious and discouraging.
70	4	"Born in the USA"	October 15, 1994	12.9
Tony's undocumented Jamaican VCR repair guy is getting shaken down by a Jamaican shakedown artist. David wants to get an earring. Tony finally finds Cyd's replacement---Paulie (John Cygan).
71	5	"Who Do You Trust?"	October 22, 1994	13.4
When John's wife is denied coverage for an operation she needs to keep her sight, he's tempted by the drug mastermind he's been hunting (Joseph Cortese)---and Tony is tempted to help him play the dishonest cop in order to bring down the mastermind and finance the surgery. The department hires a ringer to win at basketball.
72	6	"Nancy with the Laughing Face"	October 29, 1994	17.9
A failed bank robber turns out to be the once-wealthy husband of Paulie's ex-girlfriend, Nancy (Wendie Malick); he wanted the money to ransom their five-year-old son. Paulie is still romantically obsessed with Nancy, who learns her husband inadvertently did business with a mobster in a failed bid to prevent his business bankruptcy, provoking the boy's kidnapping. The boy's eventual rescue may or may not mean a reunion between Paulie and Nancy.
73	7	"Revenge"	November 5, 1994	14.9
Tony's ex-partner (Kevin Dobson) gets out of prison and travels to Eastbridge with his new young groupie wife to exact revenge on Tony, whom he blames for his conviction. The scheme turns deadly when he tries to trap the Scalis in a home fire and, as part of his elaborate cover-up, makes it appear as though Tony has killed his young wife, leaving Tony to try masterminding his capture from a holding cell.
74	8	"Head Case"	November 12, 1994	15.7
A devious married couple who run a mental hospital together (Dan Lauria and Barbara Mandrell) frame one patient for the accidental death of another, then lock up Tony when he gets suspicious.
75	9	"The Lady Vanishes"	November 19, 1994	15.0
After a tennis pro at a fancy club is drowned, Rachel concludes that the killer is an ex-student's evil stepmother. To protect the boy, Rachel goes rogue and kidnaps him. Paulie flirts with a kinky divorcée.
76	10	"Ghost"	December 3, 1994	15.0
Ronnie shoots and kills a murderous robber known as the Ghost, but gets in trouble because the Ghost's gun can't be found. Tony and Rachel tangle with a ruthless home contractor (Bruce McGill).
77	11	"A Christmas Story"	December 17, 1994	11.6
Tony puts Frank (Borgnine, recurring) under cover at a retirement home to help solve a robbery/murder. Frank finds love with a dying woman (Barbara Barrie). David can't afford Tony's Hanukkah present.
78	12	"Hidden"	January 7, 1995	14.8
A man (Marc McClure) accosts David, who resembles his long-lost son who was in the Witness Protection Program with his mother. Tony goes up against a dognapper. The father's reunion and re-connection with his son ends up taking a drastic turn when the southwestern mobster whose own son's crime pushed mother and son into the protection program---leading to the mobster's son's death in prison---is freed on a technicality.
79	13	"The Johnny Club"	January 14, 1995	16.5
Tony's pilot friend John gets run over in an apparent accident, leaving behind two wives in different cities. Tony locks David in jail for stealing CDs. Freddie deals with a leak in Tony's office.
80	14	"The Golden Years"	February 2, 1995	15.3
Tony's mother Mary (Carol Lawrence) is dating gangster Jimmy Malloy (James Karen). When Malloy turns up dead, Tony's father Al (George Kennedy) is a suspect.
81	15	"Accused"	February 9, 1995	15.4
Tony investigates an arson plot he thinks is traceable to local mobster Tommy Le Grange. Sexy computer consultant Christine Rivers (Tracy Scoggins) tries to seduce Tony behind closed doors, then accuses him of sexual harassment when he rebuffs her advances. David doctors photos, which appalls Tony at first---until he needs that skill to tie Le Grange to the death of Christine's ex-husband and Christine to Le Grange's plot, which also turns out to involve a local politician.
82	16	"The Trial"	February 16, 1995	13.4
Overly aggressive defense attorney Brenda Peterson (Tasmin Kelsey), a longtime nemesis to Tony, now needs his protection, when a rapist facing trial with her as his attorney is murdered. When bird-shaped tchotchkes go missing, Tony has Maltese Falcon-inspired dreams involving Rachel, David, Paulie, Brenda, and assistant D.A. Alex Beebee. After bombs explode at the homes of Brenda and the trial judge, Tony and Paulie discover those plus the rapist's murder are connected to the brother of one of the rapist's victims. The brother holds Tony, Brenda, and the judge hostage and stages his own trial.
83	17	"Cry Wolfe"	March 2, 1995	13.4
To redeem himself after giving a false tip, an aging grifter named Charlie Wolfe (Dick O'Neill) goes out on a limb to ensnare a gangster who stole some gold coins. Tony makes a bet with a modern artist.
84	18	"Brooklyn"	March 9, 1995	11.0
Tony and Paulie visit their old neighborhood in Brooklyn when new evidence surfaces about the murder of their best friend 12 years ago. In a series of black and white flashbacks, Paulie has a mustache.
85	19	"Letting Go"	March 23, 1995	11.9
Rachel's doctor finds a lump in her breast; the Scalis wait anxiously for the biopsy results. Tony and Paulie aim to con a con man who's been gambling with retirees' money on the stock market.
86	20	"The Kid"	March 30, 1995	12.3
Paulie catches a thief who turns out to be a homeless boy caring for his two younger brothers; after he steals Paulie's gun, he becomes a murder suspect. David turns babysitting into a house party.
87	21	"Off Broadway, Part 1"	May 13, 1995	10.3
Tony's aspiring-actress goddaughter is murdered by a brick-wielding serial killer in New York City. Tony teams up with Connie Muldoon, a divorced detective from Spanish Harlem who works alone.
88	22	"Off Broadway, Part 2"	May 20, 1995	10.9
With the murders still unsolved, Tony and Connie suspect a suspicious mailman (Clark Gregg) who lives with his mother (Frances Bay). Connie struggles in her relationship with her daughter.

=== Season 5 (1995–96) ===
No. overall	No. in season	Title	Original release date	U.S. viewers (millions)
89	1	"In the Shadow of the Gallows, Part 1"	November 30, 1995	10.7
Facing imminent execution, Robert Allardyce (Dean Stockwell) pressures Tony to revisit his case. Rachel prevents David from losing his virginity. A psychologist evaluates the department.
90	2	"In the Shadow of the Gallows, Part 2"	November 30, 1995	10.7
Tony and Paulie continue the Allardyce investigation, uncovering a cover-up. Paulie hooks up with a BIA agent, while Tony chases an FBI agent on horseback.
91	3	"Father Image, Part 1"	December 7, 1995	9.6
A woman named Emily with multiple personality disorder kills three older men, starting at the mayor's fundraiser. A retired cop friend named Terry (Darren McGavin) asks Tony for a consulting job.
92	4	"Father Image, Part 2"	December 14, 1995	10.8
Terry plants a fake murder weapon in Emily's kitchen to speed up the case, but Tony refuses to take shortcuts. Instead, Tony uses Terry as bait to catch one of Emily's murderous personalities.
93	5	"Redemption, Part 1"	January 11, 1996	12.6
A bomb sets ablaze a sweatshop belonging to Oskar Rothman (Rod Steiger). Rachel's father Ben dies of a heart attack, leaving behind clues about more bombings. David finds a puppy.
94	6	"Redemption, Part 2"	January 11, 1996	12.6
In the end Tony defeats Rothman, who was secretly a Nazi, by making him dial a fax number. David battles Rothman's neo-Nazi followers in the temple, but gives the puppy away. Rachel mourns her father.
