= Mary (1985 TV series) =

American sitcom that aired on CBS during the 1985–86 television season

- Promotional photo featuring Mary Tyler Moore and John Astin
- Genre: Sitcom
- Created by: David Isaacs; Ken Levine
- Written by: David Isaacs; Dennis Koenig; Ken Levine; Emily Marshall; Merrill Markoe; Tom Straw; Douglas Wyman
- Directed by: Peter Baldwin; Jeff Chambers; Rod Daniel; Danny DeVito; Ellen Falcon; Dolores Ferraro; Nick Havinga; Will Mackenzie
- Starring: Mary Tyler Moore; James Farentino; John Astin; David Byrd; Katey Sagal; James Tolkan; Carlene Watkins; Derek McGrath; Harold Sylvester
- Theme music composer: Dan Foliart; Howard Pearl
- Composers: Dan Foliart; Howard Pearl
- Country of origin: United States
- Original language: English
- No. of seasons: 1
- No. of episodes: 13

Production
- Executive producers: David Isaacs; Ken Levine
- Producers: David Isaacs; Ken Levine
- Editor: Andrew Chulack
- Camera setup: Multi-camera setup
- Running time: 22 min
- Production company: MTM Enterprises

Original release
- Network: CBS
- Release: December 11, 1985 – April 8, 1986

Mary is an American sitcom television series that aired on CBS from December 11, 1985, to April 8, 1986. The series stars Mary Tyler Moore in her return to series television after an absence of over six years, during which time she appeared on Broadway in Whose Life Is It Anyway? and in the dramatic film Ordinary People. After The Mary Tyler Moore Show, her subsequent ventures into series television on the variety shows Mary (1978) and The Mary Tyler Moore Hour (1979) had been short-running ratings disasters, and Moore decided to return to the sitcom format which had brought her the greatest television success; the sitcom nonetheless met the same fate as the variety shows.

== Synopsis ==
In Mary, Moore plays Mary Brenner, a 40-ish divorcée working at a second-rate tabloid, the Chicago Eagle. She was formerly a high-profile writer at a fashion magazine named Women's Digest, which recently went out of business, and she is now reduced to writing a consumer-assistance column, "Helpline", helping to expose substandard business practices and products and the often uncaring reaction of government to these problems. Her boss, managing editor Frank DeMarco (James Farentino), concentrates on sensationalism as he is convinced that that is what really sells papers. He is also quite a ladies' man, and is attracted to Mary, as she is to him, but she finds dealing with that situation to be quite awkward.

Also working at the Eagle are the cynical, chain-smoking columnist Jo Tucker (Katey Sagal), the condescending theater critic Ed LaSalle (John Astin), and Tully (David Byrd), a copy editor who can scarcely function because he is going blind but knows he isn't going away; his job has strong protection from the union. Neighbors include Susan Wilcox (Carlene Watkins), Mary's good friend, whose fiancé Lester Mintz (James Tolkan) seems to be somehow "connected".

== Change of name ==
The newspaper was originally called Chicago Post. Chicago alderman Richard Mell, who owned a newspaper by that name, asked that the name be changed because "The Chicago Post is not a sleazy newspaper." The producers changed the name before airing.

== Airing ==
Throughout its run, Mary was paired with the sitcom Foley Square starring Margaret Colin, which also premiered on December 11, 1985, and aired at 8:30 p.m. on Wednesdays immediately after Mary at 8:00 p.m. Neither show ever really found much of an audience, and after Mary's tenth episode aired on February 19, 1986, Mary went into hiatus, as did Foley Square after its eleventh episode was broadcast on February 26, 1986. Still paired, the two shows moved to Tuesdays and a later time slot in the hope of boosting their ratings. Broadcasts of both shows at the new day and time resumed on March 25, 1986, with Mary at 9:00 p.m. and Foley Square at 9:30 p.m. On Mary, Susan and Lester were written out and Mary's personal life was generally downplayed in favor of her business one. There were some favorable reviews, although some critics pronounced it as more or less a clone of her previous sitcom The Mary Tyler Moore Show. With the two shows still suffering from poor ratings in their new time slots, CBS broadcast only three more episodes of each before cancelling both of them after the thirteenth episode of Mary and fourteenth episode of Foley Square aired on April 8, 1986.

== Cast ==
- Mary Tyler Moore as Mary Brenner
- John Astin as Ed LaSalle
- David Byrd as Vincent Tully
- James Farentino as Frank DeMarco
- Derek McGrath as Ronnie Dicker
- Katey Sagal as Jo Tucker
- James Tolkan as Lester Mintz (episodes 1-9)
- Carlene Watkins as Susan Wilcox (episodes 1-9)
- Derek McGrath as Ronnie (episodes 10-13)
- Harold Sylvester as Harry (recurring, 6 episodes)

== Episodes ==
No.	Title	Directed by	Written by	Original release date	Prod. code
1	"From Pillar to Post"	Danny DeVito	Ken Levine & David Isaacs	December 11, 1985	5601
Mary is determined to prove she's tough enough to handle her new job as a consumer help-line columnist for the Chicago Eagle.
2	"Make My Day"	Danny DeVito	Ken Levine & David Isaacs	December 18, 1985	5602
Mary is chided by Jo for being too soft on a shady businessman, so Jo harangues the man by pretending to be Mary.
3	"Chicago Hi-Lo"	Ellen Falcon	Dennis Koenig	December 25, 1985	5603
Mary accepts Jo's invitation to play in the weekly office poker game, hoping to gain acceptance as one of the guys.
4	"Everyone's a Critic"	Will Mackenzie	Tom Straw	January 1, 1986	5604
Mary's vague comments about a play she was supposed to attend — but didn't — appear in Ed LaSalle's theater column review.
5	"The Death Threat"	Nick Havinga	Merrill Markoe	January 8, 1986	5606
When the Chicago Eagle is hit with death threats, Mary is shocked that Frank just laughs them off.
6	"Forest for the Trees"	Jeff Chambers	Emily Marshall	January 15, 1986	5609
Mary is depressed because her birthday is the same day as her wedding anniversary, but then she receives a gift from someone unexpected.
7	"Same Old Song"	Ellen Falcon	Ken Levine & David Isaacs	January 22, 1986	5607
Jo is visited by her on-again/off-again boyfriend (Richard Gilliland) who wants Mary to help him get his completed novel published.
8	"Beans"	Rod Daniel	Douglas Wyman	January 29, 1986	5610
Mary threatens to go over Frank's head when she's convinced he made a bad editorial decision.
9	"Table for Two"	Ellen Falcon	Emily Marshall	February 12, 1986	5611
When Mary's dinner date calls to cancel after she's left work, Frank engineers a spot at her table.
10	"Mr. Lucky"	Rod Daniel	Dennis Koenig	February 19, 1986	5612
Although he thinks he's on a lucky streak, Frank invites Mary to go to Monte Carlo and she declines his offer.
11	"And the Winner Is"	Peter Baldwin	Emily Marshall	March 25, 1986	5613
Mary is surprised to win a fashion writer's award for an article she wrote at her former job.
12	"Little Jo"	Dolores Ferraro	Tom Straw	April 1, 1986	5614
Mary organizes a dinner in her apartment for Jo and her visiting critical parents (Doris Belack and Dennis Patrick).
13	"Steppin' Out with Mary Brenner"	Peter Baldwin	Jennifer Tilly	April 8, 1986	5616
Mary is placed in an awkward position when she is assigned by Frank to review a play written, directed and produced by Ed LaSalle.

== Ratings ==
No.	Title	Air Date	Time	Rank	Rating	Viewers (Millions)
1	From Pillar to Post	December 11, 1985	Wednesday at 8:00 P.M.	#31 of 71	17.1	14.7
2	Make My Day	December 18, 1985	Wednesday at 8:00 P.M.	#43 of 66	14.3	12.3
3	Chicago Hi-Lo	December 25, 1985	Wednesday at 8:00 P.M.	#45 of 67	11.9	10.2
4	Everyone's a Critic	January 1, 1986	Wednesday at 8:00 P.M.	#16 of 64	21.0	18.0
5	The Death Threat	January 8, 1986	Wednesday at 8:00 P.M.	#44 of 65	14.8	12.7
6	Forest for the Trees	January 15, 1986	Wednesday at 8:00 P.M.	#51 of 71	13.8	11.9
7	Same Old Song	January 22, 1986	Wednesday at 8:00 P.M.	#38 of 67	15.8	13.6
8	Beans	January 29, 1986	Wednesday at 8:00 P.M.	#49 of 68	13.6	11.7
9	Table for Two	February 12, 1986	Wednesday at 8:00 P.M.	#64 of 66	12.6	10.8
10	Mr. Lucky	February 19, 1986	Wednesday at 8:00 P.M.	#56 of 68	12.3	10.5
11	And the Winner Is	March 25, 1986	Tuesday at 9:00 P.M.	#58 of 65	9.8	8.5
12	Little Jo	April 1, 1986	Tuesday at 9:00 P.M.	#57 of 67	11.8	9.3
13	Steppin' Out with Mary Brenner	April 8, 1986	Tuesday at 9:00 P.M.	#63 of 71	9.5	8.2

Source: A.C. Nielsen Company via Los Angeles Times
