= Tough Enough (1983 film) =

1983 film by Richard Fleischer

- Theatrical release poster
- Directed by: Richard Fleischer
- Written by: John Leone
- Produced by: William F. Gilmore
- Starring: Dennis Quaid; Stan Shaw; Carlene Watkins; Pam Grier; Warren Oates
- Cinematography: James A. Contner
- Edited by: Dann Cahn
- Music by: Michael Lloyd; Steve Wax
- Production company: American Cinema Productions
- Distributed by: 20th Century Fox
- Release date: March 25, 1983
- Running time: 106 minutes
- Country: United States
- Language: English
- Budget: $5 million
- Box office: $2.4 million

Tough Enough is a 1983 American romantic drama sports film directed by Richard Fleischer and starring Dennis Quaid, Pam Grier, Warren Oates (in his final film appearance) and Stan Shaw.

== Plot ==
Art Long, a down-on-his-luck country & western singer from Fort Worth enters a "toughman" competition to help pay his family's bills. Surprisingly, he does well against the other fighters and wins enough matches to qualify for a national championship. An unexpected break forces him to choose between his passion for his music career and his new-found success.

== Cast ==
- Dennis Quaid as Art Long
- Warren Oates as James Neese
- Stan Shaw as Paul Thomas "P.T." Coolidge
- Pam Grier as Myra
- Carlene Watkins as Caroline Long
- Wilford Brimley as Bill Long
- Christopher Norris as Christopher Long
- Steve "Monk" Miller as Tigran Baldasarian
- Big John Hamilton as Big John
- Eli Cummins as Gay Bob
- Doug Lord as 1st Detroit Referee
- Robert "Bobby" Watson as 2nd Detroit Referee

== See also ==
- List of boxing films
