= The Commish =

American comedy-drama television series (1991–1996)

- Intertitle
- Genre: Comedy drama
- Created by: Stephen J. Cannell; Stephen Kronish
- Starring: Michael Chiklis; Theresa Saldana; Kaj-Erik Eriksen; John Cygan; Melinda McGraw; Geoffrey Nauffts; Nicholas Lea; Gina Belafonte; David Paymer; Babz Chula
- Theme music composer: Mike Post
- Composer: Walter Murphy
- Country of origin: United States
- Original language: English
- No. of seasons: 5
- No. of episodes: 94 (list of episodes)

Production
- Executive producers: Stephen J. Cannell; Stephen Kronish; David Levinson
- Producers: Robert Cochran; John Peter Kousakis; David Greenwalt
- Running time: 46 minutes per episode
- Production companies: Three-Putt Productions; Stephen J. Cannell Productions; ABC Productions; New World Entertainment (1995–1996; season 5)

Original release
- Network: ABC
- Release: September 28, 1991 – January 11, 1996

The Commish is an American comedy-drama television series that aired on ABC in the United States from September 28, 1991, to January 11, 1996. The series focuses on the work and home life of a suburban police commissioner in fictional Eastbridge, New York. The show was filmed in Vancouver, British Columbia.

== Premise ==
The series stars Michael Chiklis as Anthony Joseph "Tony" Scali, a former NYPD detective who is now the police commissioner in the small fictional suburban New York town of Eastbridge, and tends to work through problems with humor and creativity more often than with violence or force. Theresa Saldana plays Rachel Scali (née Metzger), Tony's wife, and Kaj-Erik Eriksen plays their young son, David. Also living with the family in the first season was Rachel's freeloading brother, Arnie Metzger, played by David Paymer. A daughter, Sarah Lou, named after her maternal grandmother Sarah Metzger (Rachel's mother) and Lou Donello (an old friend and former partner of Tony's), and played by twins Justine and Dayna Cornborough, was born to Tony and Rachel in the eighth episode of the second season, "A Time to Be Born".

Focusing both on family situations and police drama, the series tackles a wide range of topical social issues such as police corruption, racism, homophobia, drug addiction, disabilities, child abuse, illegal immigration, and sexual harassment.

== Episodes ==
Season	Episodes	Originally released	
Season	Episodes	First released	Last released
1	22	September 28, 1991	May 16, 1992
2	22	September 26, 1992	May 15, 1993
3	22	September 25, 1993	May 14, 1994
4	22	September 24, 1994	May 20, 1995
5	6	November 30, 1995	January 11, 1996

== Cast ==
In addition to Commissioner Scali's family, the cast included police working under his command.

Scali had three different lieutenants at his precinct during the show's run; Lt. Irving "Irv" Wallerstein (Alex Bruhanski), his longtime buddy and second-in-command, was killed in the line of duty in the eleventh episode of Season 1, "The Fourth Man", after appearing in only a few episodes and was replaced by Lt. Paul "Paulie" Pentangeli (John Cygan), his childhood best friend. At the start of the second season, Pentangeli shot an unarmed suspect who was reaching for a cigarette case.

Although Pentangeli was acquitted, Scali nonetheless fired him, suspecting that Pentangeli knowingly shot the suspect on whom they had insufficient evidence to prosecute. Pentangeli had said that it felt like real police work. He was replaced by a female lieutenant, elegant former FBI agent Cydavia "Cyd" Madison (Melinda McGraw), who continued through to the end of season three before leaving the Eastbridge department to work as a commissioner in another city at the start of season four, when jean-wearing Pentangeli returned to the series despite his continuing disagreement with Scali regarding the nature of the shooting in season two.

The star cops who also worked closely with Scali included Stanley Oliver "Stan" Kelly (Geoffrey Nauffts), Carmela Theresa Antonia Pagan (Gina Belafonte), and hot-headed Richard "Ricky" Caruso (Nicholas Lea). Series regular Kelly was killed off at the end of season three, whereas other characters such as Pagan would simply disappear for longer stretches inexplicably.

== Production ==
Chiklis' character, Tony Scali, was at least ten years older than Chiklis' age at the time. At one point, the network, worried that Chiklis' weight loss would affect the ratings, reportedly asked him to stuff his clothing. He also was encouraged not to shave his head to look older.

Although set in the fictional town of Eastbridge in the Hudson Valley, New York, the show was filmed in Vancouver, British Columbia.

The character Tony Scali was based on the real-life 30th Commissioner of New York City's Department of Correction, Anthony Schembri, the son of an Italian immigrant, who grew up in Brooklyn. Schembri recalls incidents such as his deflecting a man intent on suicide from wanting to jumping off of a roof: “I asked him if he had a permit to jump off.” This means of diversion, used in the series premiere, characterizes Scali’s modus operandi. Schembri later served as the Secretary of the Florida Department of Juvenile Justice under Governor Jeb Bush, as the Citrus County, Florida, County Administrator, and later still as an advisor to India’s Centre for Criminology and Public Policy Committee.

Schembri was "discovered" after being a technical consultant for the TV series (while serving as the Police Commissioner of Rye, New York). The show was unrealistic in that Tony Scali the police commissioner, working as Schembri had done while he was a Brooklyn detective, would do many things a real-life police commissioner doesn't (such as personally chase criminals and investigate crimes).

Though the series was originally slated to air on CBS, unresolved casting differences led Stephen J. Cannell to cease pre-production with that network. Eventually, Cannell took the series to ABC and it won the ratings war with CBS for that time slot (Saturday nights at 10pm).

Actor Jason Alexander said he had been offered a role on the show, but turned it down as the TV show he was already cast in — Seinfeld, where he played George Costanza — got picked up for another season and went on to become one of the most successful sitcoms in history.

== Home media ==
Anchor Bay Entertainment released the first two seasons of The Commish on DVD in Region 1 in 2004–2005. Because of poor sales, these releases were discontinued and no further seasons were made available.

In 2009, Mill Creek Entertainment acquired the rights to several Stephen J. Cannell series, including The Commish. They subsequently re-released the first two seasons.

On October 12, 2010, Mill Creek released The Commish: The Complete Series on DVD in Region 1. The 17-disc set features all 94 episodes of the series on DVD for the first time.

In August 2022, Visual Entertainment released The Commish: The Complete Series on DVD in Region 1.

In Region 4, Beyond Home Entertainment has released the first four seasons on DVD in Australia.

DVD Name	Ep #	Release Dates	
DVD Name	Ep #	Region 1	Region 4
The Complete First Season	22	November 16, 2004; March 9, 2010 (re-release)	July 16, 2008
The Complete Second Season	22	February 22, 2005; September 14, 2010 (re-release)	October 15, 2008
The Complete Third Season	22	N/A	June 10, 2009
The Complete Fourth Season	22	N/A	October 7, 2009
The Complete Series	94	October 12, 2010; August 2022 (re-release)	N/A

== Awards ==
Theresa Saldana received a Golden Globe nomination for Best Performance by an Actress in a Supporting Role in 1994.
