= Carlene Watkins =

American actress (born 1952)

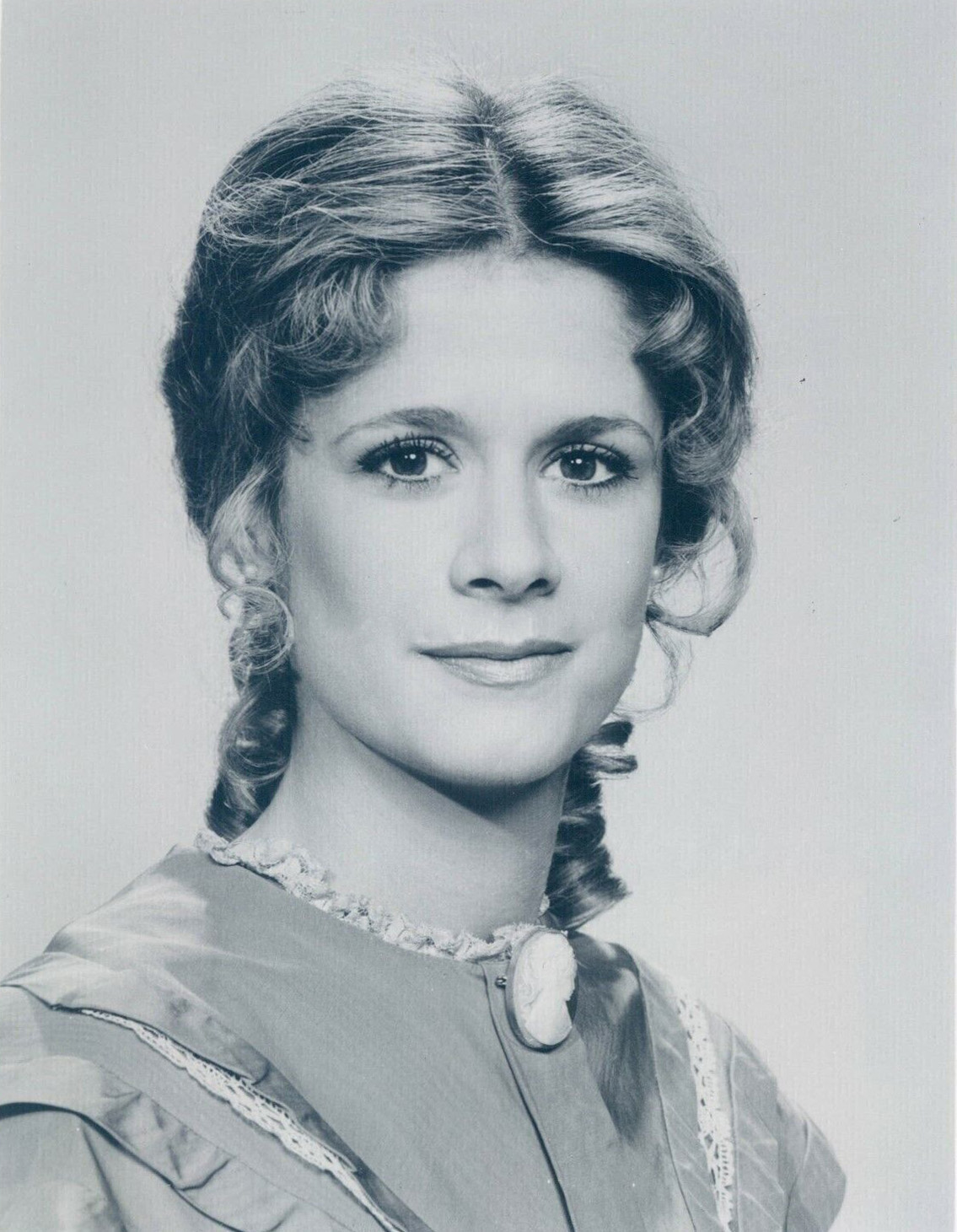
- Watkins in Best of the West, 1981
- Born: June 4, 1952 (age 74); Hartford, Connecticut, United States
- Occupation: Actress
- Spouse: Ed Weinberger (m. 1984)
- Children: 2

Carlene Watkins (born June 4, 1952) is an American actress best known for such television series and films as Best of the West, Bob, Dear John, The Tortellis and Tough Enough.

Watkins married Ed. Weinberger, a former writer for The Mary Tyler Moore Show, in 1984. They have two sons, Jack and Sam. Their son, Sam, is a 2008 graduate of Stanford University in California, where he played on the school's football team.

== Filmography ==
Film and television credits
Year	Title	Role	Notes
1977	Columbo	Amy	Episode: "The Bye-Bye Sky High I.Q. Murder Case"
1977	The Bionic Woman	Judy McHugh	Episode: "The Bionic Dog"
1977	The Rockford Files	Girl on Bus	Episode: "Beamer's Last Case"
1977	Quincy, M.E.	Girl #2	Episode: "No Deadly Secret"
1978	Switch	Shirley	Episode: "The Tong"
1978	The Two-Five	Dale Von Krieg	Television film
1978	Little Women	Sally Gardiner	Miniseries
1978	Quincy, M.E.	Maddy	Episode: "A Night to Raise the Dead"
1979	The Dukes of Hazzard	Agent Roxanne Huntley	Episode: "High Octane"
1979	The Secret Empire	Millie	2 episodes
1979	B.J. and the Bear	Leather	Episodes: "Snow White and the Seven Lady Truckers" (Parts 1 & 2)
1980	Galactica 1980	Nurse Valerie	Episodes: "The Super Scouts" (Parts 1 & 2)
1980	Condominium	Bobbie Fish	Television film
1981	B.J. and the Bear	Leather	Episode: "B.J. and the Seven Lady Truckers" (Part 2)
1981	Nero Wolfe	Jean Estey	Episode: "The Golden Spiders"
1981–1982	Best of the West	Elvira Best	22 episodes
1981	The Love Boat	Linda Trent	Episode: "Take a Letter, Vicki/The Floating Bridge Game/The Joy of Celibacy"
1982	Taxi	Susan McDaniel	Episode: "Love Un-American Style"
1982	Remington Steele	Sandy Maxwell	Episode: "In the Steele of the Night"
1982	It Takes Two	Marcella	Episode: "An Affair to Remember"
1983	It's Not Easy	Sharon Long Townsend	10 episodes
1983	Tough Enough	Caroline Long	
1983	Magnum, P.I.	Ms. Gordon	Episode: "...By Its Cover"
1984	The Love Boat	Susan Russell	Episode: "Ace in the Hole/Uncle Joey's Song/Father in the Cradle"
1984	Hotel	Karen Halveston	Episode: "Mistaken Identities"
1985–1986	Mary	Susan Wilcox	13 episodes
1986	The Love Boat	Rebecca Davis	Episode: "Hippies and Yuppies/Frat Wars/Return of the Lambdas"
1986	Brothers	Carlene Maltby	Episode: "Donald's Half-Sister"
1987	The Tortellis	Charlotte Cooper	13 episodes
1988–1989	Dear John	Wendy	5 episodes
1992–1993	Bob	Kaye McKay	33 episodes
1997	Frasier	Susan Rajeski	Episode: "Liar! Liar!"
1996–1997	Home Improvement	Linda	2 episodes
1997	Pearl	Miriam Spivak	Episode: "Mommy Dearest"
2009	Women Without Men	Mona	Television film
