= Best of the West =

American television sitcom

- Leonard Frey and Joel Higgins
- Genre: Sitcom
- Created by: Earl Pomerantz
- Starring: Joel Higgins; Carlene Watkins; Meeno Peluce; Leonard Frey; Tom Ewell; Valri Bromfield; Tracey Walter
- Theme music composer: Earl Pomerantz; Roger Steinman
- Opening theme: "Best of the West" (sung by Rex Allen)
- Country of origin: United States
- Original language: English
- No. of seasons: 1
- No. of episodes: 22

Production
- Executive producer: Earl Pomerantz
- Producer: David Lloyd
- Running time: 30 minutes
- Production companies: Weinberger/Daniels Productions; Paramount Television

Original release
- Network: ABC
- Release: September 10, 1981 – June 21, 1982

Best of the West is an American sitcom that aired on ABC from September 1981 through June 1982, with reruns continuing until August 1982.

== Synopsis ==
The Old West spoof featured the misadventures of Sam Best (Joel Higgins), a Civil War veteran who becomes a marshal in Copper Creek after accidentally scaring off an incompetent gunfighter called the Calico Kid (Christopher Lloyd).

Sam's family was made up of his Southern-belle wife Elvira (Carlene Watkins) and his smart-mouthed son Daniel (Meeno Peluce). The cast also included Leonard Frey as villain Parker Tillman, Tom Ewell as drunken town doctor Jerome Kullens, and Tracey Walter as Tillman's clueless but kind-hearted henchman, Frog Rothchild, Jr.

== Cast ==
- Joel Higgins as Sam Best
- Carlene Watkins as Elvira Best
- Tracey Walter as Frog Rothchild, Jr.
- Meeno Peluce as Daniel Best
- Tom Ewell as Jerome Kullens
- Leonard Frey as Parker Tillman

== Episodes ==
No.	Title	Directed by	Written by	Original release date
1	"Pilot"	James Burrows	Earl Pomerantz	September 10, 1981
Sam arrives in town intending to run the general store, then runs into all kinds of trouble after turning down the protection racket.
2	"The Prisoner"	Will Mackenzie	Michael Leeson, Earl Pomerantz	September 17, 1981
Sam must face a prisoner's outlaw brothers after the sheriff who was taking him in becomes ill on his way through town.
3	"Mail Order Bride"	Doug Rogers	Earl Pomerantz	September 24, 1981
Doc's mail-order bride has a vivid personality with a past to match it.
4	"The Calico Kid Returns"	Jeff Chambers	Mitch Markowitz	October 1, 1981
The Square Deal Saloon's new cook is the Calico Kid; he has sworn to never again kill anything he can't eat.
5	"The Reunion"	Ed. Weinberger	Chip Keyes, Doug Keyes	October 8, 1981
Elvira's die-hard Confederate father (Andy Griffith) stays at the Square Deal Saloon while he is in town. His wife is trying to patch things up with their daughter; she married a Yankee!
6	"They're Hanging Parker Tillman: Part 1"	Jeff Chambers	Earl Pomerantz	October 15, 1981
Sam goes out on a limb and manages to save Tillman from a lynch mob, but at the trial, his mixed-up testimony has him back at the end of a rope.
7	"They're Hanging Parker Tillman: Part 2"	Jeff Chambers	Earl Pomerantz	October 22, 1981
Sam infiltrates an outlaw band to try to prove Tillman is innocent of cattle rustling.
8	"The New Marshal"	Tom Trbovich	Mitch Markowitz	October 29, 1981
Sam loses his badge in a special election to Tillman's squeaky-clean candidate.
9	"Daniel's First Love"	James Burrows	Earl Pomerantz	November 5, 1981
Daniel is as surprised as anyone when a few innocent kisses lead to a shotgun wedding.
10	"Laney in Love"	Stan Daniels	Sam Simon	November 12, 1981
Laney is smitten with a smoothie who bids high for her at a social—but he turns out to be a low-down heel.
11	"The Railroad"	Howard Storm	Sy Rosen	November 19, 1981
Sam and Tillman try hard to convince the railroad to come to Copper Creek.
12	"The New Jail"	James Burrows	Michael Leeson	November 26, 1981
Sam's image as a lawman quickly loses its edge after he manages to shoot himself in the leg; the jail collapsing around him doesn't help.
13	"A Man, a Woman, and a Horse"	Howard Storm	Earl Pomerantz	December 17, 1981
Sam doesn't pay attention to signs of discontent from Elvira until the day he comes home to finds her packed to leave.
14	"Frog's First Gunfight"	Michael Lessac	Earl Pomerantz	January 7, 1982
Frog meets a woman who was recently jilted by her beau, but neither realizes he wants her back.
15	"The Calico Kid Goes to School"	Michael Lessac	Earl Pomerantz	January 14, 1982
The reformed Calico Kid decides he wants to be a United States Marshal. But he lacks one qualification: a third-grade education.
16	"Tillman Held for Ransom"	Howard Storm	Earl Pomerantz	January 21, 1982
Tillman has been kidnapped and the kidnappers are demanding a ransom, but the Copper Creek citizens have no intention of paying up.
17	"The Cave-In"	Howard Storm	David Lloyd	February 12, 1982
Elvira and her stepson explore an abandoned outlaw cave, unaware that it is booby-trapped to collapse.
18	"Daniel Fights a Bully"	Howard Storm	Earl Pomerantz	February 19, 1982
Daniel's refusal to fight a relentless bully leads to Sam having to fight the bully's father.
19	"The Pretty Prisoner"	Howard Storm	David Lloyd	February 26, 1982
Sam is handcuffed to his prisoner—a flirtatious female outlaw—for an overnight journey.
20	"Elvira's Old Beau"	Stan Daniels	Earl Pomerantz	June 7, 1982
Elvira's former fiance' comes to town, intent on taking her away with him.
21	"Sam's Life Is Threatened"	Stan Daniels	Earl Pomerantz	June 14, 1982
Sam receives an anonymous threatening note.
22	"The Funeral"	Ed. Weinberger	David Lloyd	June 21, 1982
Sam and Tillman try to foil a holdup by holding a funeral for Frog; the coffin contains the $20,000 the thieves are after.

== Cancellation ==
The series got off to a rough start, due to the pilot episode's pre-emption on the West Coast due to a special Thursday airing of a Pittsburgh Steelers-Miami Dolphins game running long. In the Eastern United States, the pilot served as the lead-in to the aforementioned game and was not affected by the NFL, though in any event the game would have aired in its entirety in Pittsburgh (via WTAE-TV) and Miami (via WPLG) due to the NFL's broadcasting contracts as a result of the 1968 Heidi Game. While western markets would not be affected by the NFL broadcasting rules and could have cut early from the game (a 30-10 Dolphins victory that was decided early), most ABC affiliates opted to still air the game in its entirety and pre-empt the episode in favor of their local news starting early. This mishap caused for the pilot episode of the series to flop, and ratings never recovered.

ABC delayed in renewing the series for a second season. Rather than wait for a renewal, Joel Higgins signed on to star in the new series Silver Spoons on NBC. At that point, ABC announced that it had decided to renew but was cancelling due to the star's departure.

== Noted guest stars ==
In its short run, the show managed to feature an array of guest stars. The list of noted actors and actresses who appeared include:

- Dixie Carter in Episode #19 – "The Pretty Prisoner"
- Andy Griffith in Episode #5 – "The Reunion"
- Al Lewis in Episodes #6 and #7 – "They're Hanging Parker Tillman, Parts 1 and 2"
- Christopher Lloyd in Episode #1 – "Pilot," Episode #4 – "The Calico Kid Returns," and Episode #15 – "The Calico Kid Goes to School"
- Richard Moll in Episode #2 – "The Prisoner"
- Slim Pickens in Episode #2 – "The Prisoner"
- John Randolph in Episode #11 – "The Railroad"
- Betty White in Episode #3 – "Mail Order Bride"

== Home media ==
On October 3, 2017, the Complete Series was released on manufactured-on-demand DVD by CBS DVD (distributed by Paramount).
