= John Cygan =

American actor (1954–2017)

- Born: April 27, 1954; New York City, U.S.
- Died: May 13, 2017 (aged 63); Woodland Hills, California, U.S.
- Occupations: Actor; comedian
- Years active: 1990–2017
- Children: 2

John Cygan (April 27, 1954 – May 13, 2017) was an American actor and comedian.

== Early life ==
John Cygan was born on April 27, 1954 in New York City to a large family of thirteen children, six of whom were his half-siblings. His parents never married.

He attended West Babylon High School on Long Island, and was active in church and school theatre while in high school. Highlights include his star performance as the insane brother in Arsenic and Old Lace and his lead performance in a high school production of Bye Bye Birdie, as the ever faithful agent Albert Peterson.

== Career ==
Cygan started acting on television in 1990. His notable work included Harlan Stone on Bob and Detective Paulie "Pants" Pentangeli on The Commish, as well as guest appearances on The X-Files and Modern Family.

He was also notable for his voice work on video games such as Dash Rendar on the Star Wars games, Solidus Snake on Metal Gear Solid 2: Sons of Liberty and Sandman on SOCOM U.S. Navy SEALs: Fireteam Bravo, as well as in animation such as Twitch on Toy Story 3, Who on Horton Hears a Who!, Big Red (JTC Leader) on Monsters University, and various voices on Regular Show, Cars, Surf's Up, WALL-E, Up, The Lorax, Despicable Me 2, Inside Out, and posthumously on Despicable Me 3.

== Death ==
Cygan died of cancer at his home in Woodland Hills, Los Angeles, on May 13, 2017, at the age of 63.

== Filmography ==
=== Film ===
Year	Title	Role	Notes
1992	Crow's Nest	Mike Corsetti	
2002	Treasure Planet	Hedley	Voice
2006	Ice Age: The Meltdown	Additional voices	Voice
2006	Cars	Additional voices	Voice
2006	Happily N'Ever After	Additional Voices	
2007	Surf's Up	Additional Voices	
2008	Horton Hears a Who!	Who	Voice
2008	WALL-E	Axiom Passenger #3	Voice
2008	Ponyo	Additional Voices	English Dub
2009	Up	Additional Voices	
2009	Cloudy with a Chance of Meatballs	Macaroni Head Man	Voice
2010	Diary of a Wimpy Kid	Voice Cast	
2010	Toy Story 3	Twitch	Voice
2010	Superman/Batman: Apocalypse	Male Radio Caller / Gus	Direct-to-video Voice
2011	Small Fry	Additional Voice Talent	Short
2012	The Lorax	Additional Voices	
2012	Partysaurus Rex	Additional Voices	Short
2013	Monsters University	Big Red (JTC Leader)	Voice
2013	Despicable Me 2	Additional Voices	
2015	Inside Out	Pizza Slices	Voice
2015	Minions	Additional Voices	
2015	Fantastic Four	Voice Cast	
2017	Despicable Me 3	Additional Voices	Final film role; posthumous release

=== Television ===
Year	Title	Role	Notes
1990	Babes		Episode: "Everything But Love"
1992-1993	Bob	Harlan Stone	25 episodes
1994	The X-Files	Sheriff Spencer	Episode: "Blood"
1992-1996	The Commish	Detective Paulie "Pants" Pentangeli	35 episodes
1996	Frasier	Doug Harvey	Episode: "High Crane Drifter"
1997	Nothing Sacred	Billy Riley	Episode: "Roman Catholic Holiday"
1998	Diagnosis: Murder	Dr. Adam Embry	Episode: "Baby Boom"
1998	The Hughleys	Officer	Episode: "Keeping Romance Alive"
2000-2003	Poochini	Additional voices	26 episodes
2001	Becker	Detective Cross	Episode: "Breakfast of Chumpions"
2002	NYPD Blue	Tommy Dwyer	2 episodes
2003	Judging Amy	Jeremy Cools	Episode: "Sixteen Going on Seventeen"
2004	The Grim Adventures of Billy & Mandy	TV Announcer / Man at Police Station (voice)	Episode: "Bearded Billy"
2006	The Shield	LAPD Chief of Police Johnson	Episode: "Of Mice and Lem"
2007	Ben 10	Kangaroo Commando / Abel and Kane North (voice)	Episode: "Super Alien Hero Buddy Adventures"
2010	A Good Knight's Quest	Charles	2 episodes
2011	Mater's Tall Tales	additional voices (voice)	6 episodes
2011	The Don of the Flies	Husband / Junior / The Don (voice)	Also writer and director.
2012-2016	Regular Show	Main Bear / Roger / Archie the Archivist / various voices	27 episodes
2013	Modern Family	Admissions Dean	Episode: "The Future Dunphys"
2014	Tales from Radiator Springs	Idle Threat (voice)	Episode: "The Radiator Springs 500 ½"
2015	Pickle and Peanut	Badger (voice)	Episode: "Busted Arm"

=== Video games ===
Year	Title	Role	Notes
1997	Star Wars: Shadows of the Empire	Dash Rendar	PC version
1999	Star Wars: X-Wing Alliance	Dash Rendar / Civilian Pilot	
2000	Grandia II	Melfice / Client / Brother 1	English version
2001	Metal Gear Solid 2: Sons of Liberty	Solidus Snake	English version
2002	Star Wars: Galactic Battlegrounds	Dash Rendar / General Rand Talor / Quarren Thug|	
2003	Dark Chronicle	Master Utan	
2003	Arc the Lad: Twilight of the Spirits	Droguza	English version
2003	Star Wars: Knights of the Old Republic	Canderous Ordo	
2003	Robin Hood: Defender of the Crown	Little John	
2004	Painkiller	Sammael	
2004	The Punisher	Eddie Gnucci / Carlo Duka	
2004	EverQuest II	Concordium (High Elf) / Apprentice Kalimar; Archivist Jindlefog / Neophyte Jhanov; Guard Rellin'thir / Wisp of Marr / Arqis the Mage; Biddy Bobick / Broker Algernon / Royal Accountant Fowler; Janus Fieri	
2004	Star Wars Knights of the Old Republic II: The Sith Lords	Mandalore the Preserver	
2005	Destroy All Humans!	General Armquist, Cop 2	
2005	X-Men Legends II: Rise of Apocalypse	Iron Man, Ka-Zar	
2005	SOCOM U.S. Navy SEALs: Fireteam Bravo	Sandman	
2006	Marvel: Ultimate Alliance	Iron Man, Warstar	
2006	The Sopranos: Road to Respect	Additional Voices	
2006	SOCOM U.S. Navy SEALs: Fireteam Bravo 2	Sandman	
2007	Medal of Honor: Vanguard	Sgt. John Magnuson	
2007	Lair	Koba Kai	
2008	Rise of the Argonauts	Additional voices	
2008	Madagascar: Escape 2 Africa	Makunga	
2008	Endwar	Additional voices	
2008	Too Human	Neilssen / Engineer / Pilot #2	
2008	Metal Gear Solid 4: Guns of the Patriots	Solidus Snake	English version, archived recordings, uncredited
2009	Call of Juarez: Bound in Blood	Col. Jeremy Barnsby	
2010	Command & Conquer 4: Tiberian Twilight	Additional Voices	
2010	Prince of Persia: The Forgotten Sands	Malik	
2010	Toy Story 3: The Video Game	Twitch	
2010	Mafia II	Pepé	
2011	Call of Juarez: The Cartel	Michael Duke / Additional Voices	
2011	Dead Island	Dr. West / Additional Voices	
2011	The Lord of the Rings: War in the North	Farin	
2012	The Darkness II	Leo / Additional Voices	
2012	Kingdoms of Amalur: Reckoning	Agarth	
2012	Ninja Gaiden 3	Captain Heinlein	English version
2012	Spec Ops: The Line	Officers / Damned Officer	
2012	Halo 4	Additional Voices	
2013	Call of Juarez: Gunslinger	Silas Greaves	
2013	Grand Theft Auto V	The Local Pedestrian Population	
2014	Broken Age	Dad / Conductor / Spoon	
2016	World of Warcraft: Legion	Additional Voices	
2016	Mafia III	Additional Voices	
2016	Final Fantasy XV	Additional Voices	English version
2018	Red Dead Redemption 2	The Local Pedestrian Population	Posthumous release
