= Jonathan Stark (actor) =

American actor

- Born: Gordon Johnston Stark; February 16, 1954 (age 72); Erie, Pennsylvania, U.S.
- Years active: 1960–present

Gordon Johnston "Jonathan" Stark (born February 16, 1952) is an American television producer, writer, and actor.

== Career ==
Stark created, along with his writing partner, Tracy Newman, the sitcom According to Jim and won an Emmy for his co-writing on "The Puppy Episode" in which Ellen DeGeneres's character Ellen Morgan came out of the closet on Ellen in 1997. As an actor, he is best known for playing the vampire bodyguard and servant Billy Cole in Fright Night (1985), Sergeant Krieger in Project X (1987), and Charlie in House II: The Second Story (1987).

== Personal life ==
Stark and his wife Linda have been married since May 17, 1992, and have two children.

== Filmography ==
=== Film ===
Year	Title	Role	Notes
1985	Fright Night	Billy Cole	
1987	Project X	Sgt. Krieger	
1987	House II: The Second Story	Charlie	
1988	Bright Lights, Big City	Additional voices	Voice role
1990	The Spirit of '76		Voice role
1991	Career Opportunities	Voiceover	Voice role
1992	Mom and Dad Save the World	Lieutenant Destroyer	
2018	Brand New Old Love	Ron	

=== Television ===
Year	Title	Role	Notes
1981	Darkroom	Young Man in Bar	Episode: "The Partnership"
1985	Moonlighting	Undercover Cop	Episode: "Brother, Can You Spare a Blonde?"
1986	Prince of Bel Air	Brad Griffin	Television film
1987	Cheers	Wayne	Episode: "Home Is the Sailor"
1989	On the Television	Various	3 episodes
1989	Just Temporary	Ken	Television film
1990	Tales from the Crypt	Eddie	Episode: "My Brother's Keeper"
1993	Bob	Willy	Episode: "Tell Them Willy Mammoth Is Here"
1994	Hardball	Beefy Guy	Episode: "Pilot"
1996	Ellen	Gus	Episode: "Go Girlz"
2005	The Comeback	Angry Driver	Episode: "Pilot"

== Awards ==
- 1997, Primetime Emmy Award for Outstanding Writing for a Comedy Series, Ellen, "The Puppy Episode"
- Nomination, 1998, WGA Award, Episodic Comedy, Ellen, "The Puppy Episode"
