= The Groundlings =

American improv and theater group since 1974

Coordinates: 34.083694°N 118.349001°W

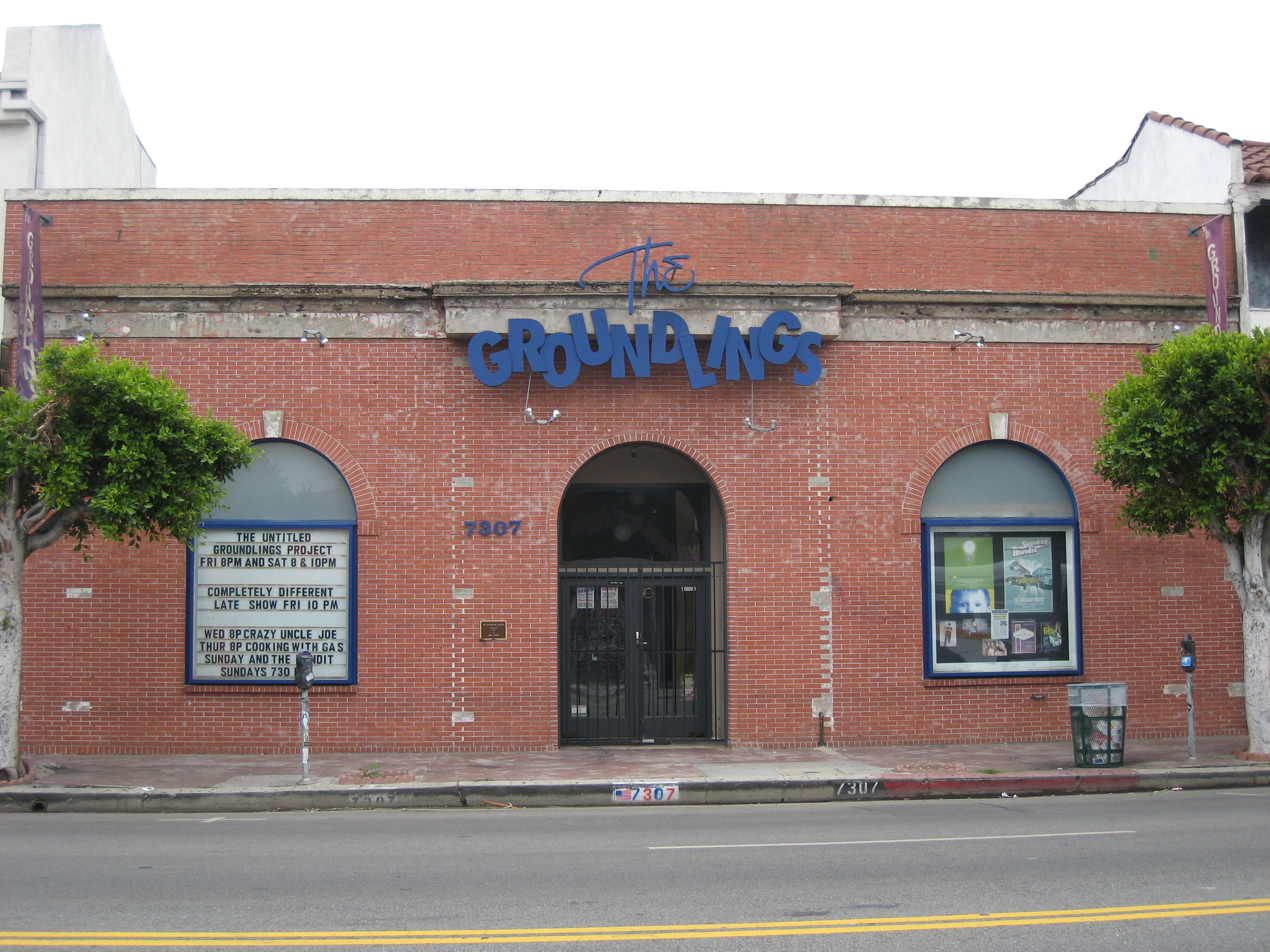
- The Groundlings building on Melrose Avenue
- Genre: Sketch comedy Improvisation
- Date of premiere: 1974; 52 years ago
- Location: Los Angeles, California, United States
- Official website

The Groundlings is an American improvisational and sketch comedy troupe and school based in Los Angeles, California. The troupe was formed by Gary Austin in 1974 and uses an improv format influenced by Viola Spolin, whose improv techniques were taught by Del Close and other members of the Second City, located in Chicago. They used these techniques to produce sketches and improvised scenes. Its name is taken from Shakespeare's Hamlet, Act III, Scene II: "...to split the ears of the groundlings, who for the most part are capable of nothing but inexplicable dumbshows and noise." In 1975 the troupe purchased and moved into its location on Melrose Avenue.

The Groundlings School holds sessions every six weeks with over 300 students per session, with more than 2,000 students per year going through the program. The competitive program, with admission by audition, consists of five levels (Basic, Intermediate, Advanced Improv, Writing Lab, and Advanced Writing Lab). Participants must satisfy instructors' requirements in order to advance from the first three levels. For Writing Lab and Advanced Writing Lab, students are voted on by then-current members of the Main Company as to whether they will move on. This vote is based on the students writing and performing Groundlings style sketch shows.

The program can take several years to complete. Students may be asked to repeat Basic and Intermediate classes multiple times. Upon completion of Advanced Writing Lab, students may be voted into the Sunday Company, where they may remain for no more than 18 months. (Sunday Company members are cast for six months at a time, and can be voted into Sunday Company for a maximum of three six-month periods.) Sunday Company members are eligible to be voted into Main Company (or "the Groundlings") at the end of each six-month term of Sunday Company.

Many Groundlings performers appeared in movies and television, including several who have become cast members and writers on Saturday Night Live, MADtv, Reno 911!, and the G4 network while also being active on the internet, mainly YouTube.

== History ==
In 1972, Gary Austin (a veteran of San Francisco's The Committee) assembled a group of performers in Los Angeles to work on their craft. They would improvise, perform monologues, scenes, characters, songs, dances, and classic plays. After about a year, they started doing performances and inviting friends to come and watch. Word got out about the workshop, more people started coming, and a core group of performers began to showcase their material at various venues around Hollywood.

In January 1974, Austin announced that he wanted to create a theatre company. There were fifty founding members of the company (membership at that time required payment of $25 to attend workshops). They developed material in the workshops and performed the best pieces in the weekend shows. The group produced its first show in the 30-seat basement of 1089 North Oxford Avenue, (earlier, the Oxford Theatre, then The MET, later the Eastwood Performing Arts Center) near the corner of Santa Monica Boulevard and Western Avenue. Los Angeles Times theatre critic Sylvie Drake was in the audience the first weekend, and wrote a rave review.

As the buzz about the new company increased, the entertainment industry started taking notice. Comedian Lily Tomlin was a regular in the audience, and she hired several Groundlings to perform on her The Lily Tomlin Show. Later that year Lorne Michaels, who produced Tomlin's TV special, asked Groundling Laraine Newman to be a cast member for Saturday Night Live.

Membership in the company grew to 90. To keep the size of the company down, it required selection by audition. Phil Hartman, then a graphic designer, tried out in the first audition. He was accepted, but due to competition, he had to wait more than a year before starting to perform in shows. With such a large company, workshops seven days a week, and sold-out shows going up three nights a weekend, the Groundlings needed a place to call their own.

The Groundlings School of improvisation began in 1978 with 17 students and staff members Gary Austin, Tom Maxwell, Phyllis Katz, Laraine Newman, and Tracy Newman. In the 21st century, it has an annual enrollment of more than 4200 students. The Sunday Company was formed by Suzanne Kent in 1982 to further develop the talent coming through the school.

In 1975 the company acquired what became the Groundlings Theatre at 7307 Melrose Avenue (the building was previously used as an interior decorator's studio, a furniture showroom, a gay bar, and a massage parlor). Through equity and with the use of their own funds, company members set out to modernize the building and convert it into a performance space. They battled through four years of red tape, building codes, and parking restrictions before producing any shows on the stage. During that time the Groundlings performed their revues at a handful of theaters all over town, including The Improv, The Matrix, The Hollywood Canteen, and the White House. Finally in April 1979, the revitalized 99-seat theater opened its doors to audiences.

In November 1979, Gary Austin stepped down from his position as artistic director. Tom Maxwell was elected as his successor, and he served for the next ten years. In 1989, the Groundlings began the enduring tradition of having Groundlings or Groundlings alumni direct each new revue. The Main Company of no more than 30 members, collectively makes artistic, business and creative decisions. In April 2017 the Groundlings paid tribute to passing of their founder, Gary Austin, by gathering at the theatre and laying flowers at his plaque.

== Operations ==
Students must pass an audition to get into the Basic class. If a student passes the audition, their results are valid for one year. If a student does not pass the audition, they are allowed to audition again in four months. Students are allowed to audition a total of three times.

After completing the Advanced Lab level, a student may be voted into the Sunday Company, which performs every Sunday at 7:30pm. During this time, students write, rehearse and perform new material every week. After six months of performing in the Sunday Company, students are either voted to remain in the company for another six months, voted to be dismissed from the school, or voted into the Main Company, also known as the Groundlings. No one can stay in the Sunday Company for longer than 18 months nor less than six months.

All members of the Main Company are selected from members of the Sunday Company. All of the Main Company members can remain in the company for as long as they desire. Usually members do not stay for longer than a decade; most of the Groundlings retire sooner from the company. The Main Company (capped at no more than 30 members at any time) collectively acts as the organization's artistic director, democratically making business and creative decisions as a group.

== Shows ==
The Groundlings Revues (now commonly referred to as the Main Shows) were the first shows performed by the company and they established the Groundlings improv, character, and sketch comedy style. In 1981, the revue was given a title, "L.A. 200, Groundlings 3". Since that time every revue has had its own name, and has the word "Groundling" in the title. Initially one or two revues were performed in a year, increasing to three by the 1990s, and four in 2007, in addition to a special holiday show in December. Main Shows are performed every Friday at 8:00 p.m. and every Saturday at 8:00 p.m. and 10:00 p.m.

In 1992, Melanie Graham created Cookin With Gas, a weekly short form improv show performed by Groundlings, Groundlings Alumni, Sunday Company members, and special celebrity guests. The show continues to be performed every Thursday night at 8:00 p.m., and is now the longest running improv show in Los Angeles. It was followed in 2001 by the long-form improv Crazy Uncle Joe Show, which runs every Wednesday night at 8:00 p.m.

== Creation of The Pee-wee Herman Show ==
Beginning in 1981, the company added alternative format shows to the theatre's regular line-up. The first one was The Pee-wee Herman Show, created and co-written by Paul Reubens as a showcase for his Pee-wee Herman character, which he created in Groundlings workshops and revues. Pee-wee and his friends (played by and co-written by other Groundlings including Phil Hartman, Lynne Marie Stewart, John Paragon, Edie McClurg, and John Moody) started performing Saturdays at midnight, after the regular revues. Quickly the show became a huge LA hit; it moved to The Roxy Theatre on Sunset Blvd and was filmed for an HBO special. In the following years, Pee-wee became a pop culture icon; films, toys, and a children's television show were created about the character. An updated revival of the original stage show (with many of the Groundlings reprising their roles) had a successful run in Los Angeles' Nokia Theatre and in New York on Broadway at the Stephen Sondheim Theatre on November 11, 2010. The production was filmed for another HBO Special.

== In popular culture ==
Groundlings cast on Saturday Night Live and Mad TV have often adapted their sketches and characters developed at the Groundlings into TV audience favorites. Former members of the Groundlings have further developed such materials into shows and films, such as Pee-wee's Big Adventure, Pee-wee's Playhouse, Elvira, Mistress of the Dark, A Night at the Roxbury, and Romy and Michele's High School Reunion.

In 1998, the Groundlings were given an improv television program on the F/X network called Instant Comedy with The Groundlings. In September 2008, the Groundlings began producing short-form sketch episodes for Crackle.

On September 12, 2011, the Groundlings featured a sketch titled "Resting Bitch Face" (written by Patric Cagle, co-starring Nate Clark, and directed by Mitch Silpa). The sketch was uploaded to YouTube on October 11 and performed repeatedly during fall of the same year.

The film Bridesmaids was written by Groundlings alum Kristen Wiig and Annie Mumolo and featured a cast consisting heavily of members of the Groundlings, including Melissa McCarthy, Maya Rudolph, Wendi McLendon-Covey, and others in supporting roles. The movie was a box office success and nominated for two Academy Awards. In the same year, Groundlings Jim Rash and Nat Faxon won the Best Adapted Screenplay Oscar for The Descendants.

== David Blaine Street Magic ==
In 2006, the Groundlings recorded a skit called David Blaine Street Magic performed in the alleyway behind the theater. After being uploaded to YouTube, it became one of the most popular videos on the website. As of October 2014, the video has had more than 38 million views and 60,000 comments since October 12, 2006. The skit stars Mitch Silpa parodying David Blaine in both the topics of Blaine's performances and his mannerisms. The skit is written by Michael Naughton and Mikey Day who play the two innocent bystanders in the video.

== Members ==
=== Current Main Company ===
- Ashley Bell
- Erin Berry
- Lauren Burns
- Alex Bonifer
- Michael Churven
- Matt Cook
- David Crabb
- H. Michael Croner
- Samantha DeSurra
- Josh Duvendeck
- Chris Eckert
- Julian Gant
- Ryan Gaul
- Anthony Guerino
- Patty Guggenheim
- Echo Kellum
- Kiel Kennedy
- Chris Kleckner
- Andrew Leeds
- Lyric Lewis
- Kara Morgan
- Andres Parada
- Eilise Patton
- Emily Pendergast
- Jessica Pohly
- Jay Renshaw
- Chase Rosenberg
- Leonard Robinson
- Gaby Sandoval
- Eliot Schwartz
- Tru Valentino
- Greg Worswick
- Simon Sorrells
- Anna Hughes

=== Notable Main Company alumni ===
- Tim Bagley
- Jillian Bell
- Gregg Berger
- Patrick Bristow
- Maryedith Burrell
- Jim Cashman
- John Cervenka
- Jennifer Coolidge
- Stephanie Courtney
- Mikey Day
- Allison Dunbar
- Christian Duguay
- Ben Falcone
- Will Ferrell
- Will Forte
- Daniele Gaither
- Heidi Gardner
- Ana Gasteyer
- Kathy Griffin
- Rachael Harris
- Phil Hartman
- Sandy Helberg
- Cheryl Hines
- Michael Hitchcock
- Alex Kapp Horner
- Chris Kattan
- John Kilduff
- Taran Killam
- Kip King
- Lisa Kudrow
- Phil LaMarr
- Jon Lovitz
- Tress MacNeille
- Melissa McCarthy
- Edie McClurg
- Michael McDonald
- Wendi McLendon-Covey
- Pat Morita
- Annie Mumolo
- Craig T. Nelson
- Laraine Newman
- Tracy Newman
- Cheri Oteri
- Ashley Padilla
- Brian Palermo
- John Paragon
- Chris Parnell
- Edi Patterson
- Cassandra Peterson
- Rachel Ramras
- Jim Rash
- Paul Reubens
- Jeremy Rowley
- Maya Rudolph
- Kevin Ruf
- Mary Scheer
- Mindy Sterling
- Steve Little
- Julia Sweeney
- Cynthia Szigeti
- Judy Toll
- B. J. Ward
- Kristen Wiig
- Jim Wise

=== Notable school and Sunday Company alumni ===
- J. J. Abrams
- Cecily Adams
- Steve Agee
- Joey Arias
- James Adomian
- Tyra Banks
- Amanda Lehan-Canto
- Adam Carolla
- Calico Cooper
- Eliza Coupe
- Abby Elliott
- Jimmy Fallon
- Chloe Fineman
- Bob Flanagan
- Daryl Hannah
- Mariska Hargitay
- Echo Kellum
- Chase Masterson
- Tim Matheson
- Heather McDonald
- Lee Newton
- Eryn Jean Norvill
- Oscar Nuñez
- Conan O'Brien
- Kaitlin Olson
- Nasim Pedrad
- Joe Ranft
- Stephen Rannazzisi
- Lou Romano
- Mike Schwartz
- Dax Shepard
- Sherri Stoner
- Nancy Sullivan
- C. C. Swiney
- Michelle Thomas
- Karri Turner
- Rita Wilson
- Vanessa Taylor
- Fortune Feimster
- Tom Segura

== See also ==
- The Second City – American improvisational theatre troupe
- Upright Citizens Brigade – New York and Los Angeles-based improv and sketch comedy troupe
- ImprovOlympic – Improv theater and training center in Chicago, Illinois
- ComedySportz – Improvisational comedy organization
- Under the Gun Theater – Theater in Chicago, Illinois
- Annoyance Theatre – Chicago theatre group
- Footlights – Student comedy troupe in Cambridge, UK
- Improv Everywhere – Comedic performance art group based in New York City
