= What's New? (American TV program) =

US science and entertainment TV program for children

What's New? is a half-hour American daily science and entertainment television program for children, that was broadcast on the National Educational Television (NET) network and its 1970 successor, the Public Broadcasting Service (PBS), from 1962 to 1973. The program aired in black-and-white and, then as of October 1967, in color.

The show began with a marching theme, with the narrator saying: "In, Out, and Round About. Here, There, and Everywhere. What's New?"

The target audience was upper elementary school and junior high school grades. The show was hosted by Al Binford, with daily segments presented by science teacher George Fischbeck, naturalist Murl Deusing and others, including deaf mime actor Bernard Bragg whose silent semi-comical educational adventure sketches were based on the artistry of his teacher, Marcel Marceau. Ron Finley created the opening credits. Each program would deal with three different topics, such as baseball or space science.
