= Arman Darbo =

French-American actor

- Born: 2001 (age 24–25); Paris, France
- Occupations: Actor, Producer
- Years active: 2008–present

Arman Ulysses Darbo (born 2001) is a French-American actor, known for his role as Edwin in And Then I Go and Ulysses in Greatland.

== Personal life and career ==
Darbo was born in France, and moved to Beijing, China at a young age, where he would live for a decade before residing in the US. His acting career began at 6 when he and his family were approached by a casting agent in a shopping mall. He would star in various projects, such Fengyatou and My DV Diary, when his popularity quickly spread. His feature film debut was in Kung Fu Man, starring alongside Tiger Chen and produced by Keanu Reeves. In 2013, he starred in Deep Sleep No More.

In 2015, Darbo was cast in Defenders of Life and won the silver medal for Best Actor Under 18 at the Global Independent Film Awards.

In 2017, Darbo appeared alongside Sawyer Barth in And Then I Go as the lead role of Edwin. Barth, who plays Flake, originally auditioned for the role as well but was called back to try out for his character, Flake. Darbo described going into the role, saying, "It’s not like I must be a completely different person for the role, I just had to explore a part of myself I’d never explored before."

In 2019, Darbo starred in horror film Itsy Bitsy, and, in 2020, starred in sci-fi film Greatland as the lead role of Ulysses. In addition to the role, he also composed some of the music for the film.

He currently resides in Los Angeles, California, and attends Los Angeles Valley College.

== Filmography ==
=== Film ===
Year	Title	Role	Notes
2011	Beginning of the Great Revival	Parisian Boy	
2012	Kung Fu Man	Christopher	
2013	Deep Sleep No More	Adine	
2015	Defenders of Life	Feb	
2017	And Then I Go	Edwin Hanratty	Lead role
2019	Itsy Bitsy	Jesse Spencer	
2020	Greatland	Ulysses	Lead role

=== Podcast ===
Year	Title	Role	Notes
2022	How I Solved the Homeless Crisis in Cali	Jay	
