= Shinji Kawada =

Japanese voice actor (born 1971)

- 川田 紳司
- Born: October 6, 1971 (age 54); Tochigi Prefecture, Japan
- Other name: Wassyoi Tarou
- Occupation: Voice actor
- Years active: 2000–present
- Agent: Ken Production
- Notable credits: Naruto as Shino Aburame

Shinji Kawada (川田 紳司, Kawada Shinji; born October 6, 1971) is a Japanese voice actor. For his eroge works, he goes by the name Taro Wasshoi (ワッショイ太郎, Wasshoi Taro).

== Filmography ==
=== Anime ===
==== 2010s ====
- JoJo's Bizarre Adventure: Stardust Crusaders (Rubber Soul)

==== 2020s ====
2024

- Delicious in Dungeon (Shuro)

2025

- Fire Force 3rd Season (Stream)
- Mobile Suit Gundam GQuuuuuuX (Challia Bull)
- Apocalypse Bringer Mynoghra (Gia)
- The Obsessed (Boss Salsa)

2026

- I Made Friends with the Second Prettiest Girl in My Class (Itsuki Maehara)

=== Video games ===
- Mega Man 11 (2018) (Tundra Man)
- Marvel Tokon: Fighting Souls (2026) (Spider-Man)

=== Dubbing ===
==== Live-action ====
- Jim Sturgess
  - Across the Universe (2007; Jude)
  - 21 (2008; Ben Campbell)
  - The Way Back (2010; Janusz Wieszczek)
  - One Day (2011; Dexter Mayhew)
- Richard Madden
  - Game of Thrones (2011; Robb Stark)
  - Ibiza (2018; Leo West)
  - Rocketman (2019; John Reid)
  - Eternals (2021; Ikaris)
- 3 Idiots (Raju Rastogi (Sharman Joshi))
- The Autopsy of Jane Doe (Austin Tilden (Emile Hirsch))
- Awake (Clay Beresford, Jr. (Hayden Christensen))
- Back to the Future (2014 BS Japan edition) (Goldie Wilson (Donald Fullilove))
- The Boy in the Striped Pyjamas (Kurt Kotler (Rupert Friend))
- Constantine (Chas Kramer (Shia LaBeouf))
- Cruella (Jeffrey (Andrew Leung))
- Dragon Tiger Gate (Turbo Shek (Shawn Yue))
- The Finest Hours (Ray Sybert (Casey Affleck))
- Hail, Caesar! (Hobie Doyle (Alden Ehrenreich))
- Jason Bourne (Aaron Kalloor (Riz Ahmed))
- Joy Ride 2: Dead Ahead (Nik Parker (Kyle Schmid))
- Kung Fu Dunk (Ting Wei (Chen Bolin))
- The Marine 2 (Joe Linwood (Ted DiBiase Jr.))
- Midway (Lieutenant Roy Pearce (Alexander Ludwig))
- The Other Guys (Detective Terry Hoitz (Mark Wahlberg))
- Paranormal Activity: The Ghost Dimension (Ryan Fleege (Chris J. Murray))
- Reasonable Doubt (Mitch Brockden (Dominic Cooper))
- Ruby Sparks (Calvin Weir-Fields (Paul Dano))
- The Schouwendam 12 (Pim Nijboer (Matthijs van de Sande Bakhuyzen))
- Small Apartments (Bernard Franklin (James Marsden))
- Stop-Loss (PFC Tommy Burgess (Joseph Gordon-Levitt))
- Supernatural (Garth Fitzgerald IV (DJ Qualls))
- Tom-Yum-Goong (Johnny (Johnny Trí Nguyễn))
- Triple Threat (Long Fei (Tiger Chen))
- Vampires Suck (Edward Sullen (Matt Lanter))
- Vincent N Roxxy (Vincent (Emile Hirsch))
- Westworld (William (Jimmi Simpson))
