= San Shao Ye De Jian =

三少爺的劍 may refer to:

- Death Duel, 1977 Hong Kong film
- Sword Master (film), 2016 Chinese film
