= Andy Walken =

American actor (born 2006)

- Born: April 26, 2006 (age 19); Mukilteo, Washington, U.S.
- Occupation: Actor
- Years active: 2015–present

Andy Walken (born April 26, 2006) is an American actor, known for his role as William Cleary in The Kids Are Alright and Ralphie Parker in A Christmas Story Live!. In 2022, he won the first-ever Children's and Family Emmy Award for Outstanding Younger Voice Performer in an Animated or Preschool Animated Program for his work as Young Durpleton in Centaurworld.

== Personal life ==
Originally from Mukilteo, Washington, Walken started as a competitive ice skater at the age of five and began his acting career in 2015 after being discovered at a national talent convention. He was cast as the lead role of Ralphie in Fox's A Christmas Story Live! in 2017.

== Filmography ==
=== Film ===
Year	Title	Role	Notes
2017	The Most Hated Woman in America	Young William "Billy Boy" Murray	
2020	We Can Be Heroes	Wheels	

=== Television ===
Year	Title	Role	Notes
2015	NCIS: Naval Criminal Investigative Service	Young Nicholas Mallard	Episode: "Spinning Wheel"
2016	Heartbeat	Colin Tollefson	Episode: "Sanctuary"
2017	Entertainment Tonight	Self	1 episode
2017	AfterBuzz TV Red Carpets, Junkets and Events	Self	1 episode
2017	Escaping Dad	Charlie	TV movie
2017	A Christmas Story Live!	Ralphie	TV movie
2018–2019	The Kids Are Alright	William Cleary	Main role
2019	Modern Family	Deadpool	Episode: "The Last Halloween"
2021	Centaurworld	Young Durpleton	Voice; episode: "Bunch O' Scrunch"
2023	Gen V	Dusty	2 episodes

=== Video games ===
Year	Title	Role	Notes
2020	Pixel Ripped 1995	Mike	Voice

== Awards and nominations ==
Year	Nominated work	Award	Category	Result	Refs
2022	Centaurworld: Bunch O' Scrunch	Children's and Family Emmy Awards	Outstanding Younger Voice Performer in an Animated or Preschool Animated Program	Won	
