= A Christmas Story Live! =

2017 live TV production inspired by the movie A Christmas Story

- Genre: Musical
- Based on: A Christmas Story: The Musical by; Benj Pasek; Justin Paul; Joseph Robinette; A Christmas Story by; Jean Shepherd; Leigh Brown; Bob Clark; In God We Trust: All Others Pay Cash by Jean Shepherd
- Written by: Robert Cary; Jonathan Tolins
- Directed by: Scott Ellis; Alex Rudzinski
- Starring: Fred Armisen; Chris Diamantopoulos; Ana Gasteyer; David Alan Grier; Ken Jeong; Jane Krakowski; Maya Rudolph; Andy Walken
- Narrated by: Matthew Broderick
- Composers: Benj Pasek; Justin Paul
- Country of origin: United States

Production
- Executive producers: Marc Platt; Adam Siegel
- Producers: Robert Cary; Jonathan Tolins
- Production locations: Warner Bros. Studios, Burbank, California
- Running time: 133 minutes
- Production companies: Marc Platt Productions; Warner Horizon Television

Original release
- Network: Fox
- Release: December 17, 2017

A Christmas Story Live! is an American television special that was originally broadcast by Fox on December 17, 2017. The special was produced by Marc Platt Productions and Warner Horizon Television. It was a live, televised musical remake of the 1983 film A Christmas Story, and incorporated the 2012 stage musical version A Christmas Story: The Musical. The live musical was executive produced by Marc Platt and Adam Siegel, directed by Scott Ellis and Alex Rudzinski, and starred Matthew Broderick, Andy Walken, Maya Rudolph, Chris Diamantopoulos, and Jane Krakowski.

== Premise ==
A Christmas Story Live! is based on "the short stories of humorist Jean Shepherd and is set in 1940's Indiana. It follows 9-year-old Ralphie Parker and his unrelenting desire to get his hands on a Red Ryder BB gun for Christmas".

== Cast and characters ==
The Parker Family

- Andy Walken as Ralphie Parker
  - Matthew Broderick as Ralphie as an Adult
- Maya Rudolph as Mother
- Chris Diamantopoulos as The Old Man
- Tyler Wladis as Randy Parker

School characters

- Jane Krakowski as Miss Shields
- Sammy Ramirez as Schwartz
- JJ Batteast as Flick
- Sacha Carlson as Scut Farkus
- Elie Samouhi as Grover Dill
- Abigail Dylan Harrison as Louise
- Artyon Celestine as Richie
- Allie Kiesel as Mary Beth
- Hayley Shukiar as Esther Jane

Other

- Ana Gasteyer as Mrs. Schwartz
- Ken Jeong as Tree Salesman/Restaurant Owner
- David Alan Grier as Mall Santa
- Fred Armisen as Mall Elf
- PrettyMuch as Hohman Indiana carolers

== Musical numbers ==
Two songs were created exclusively for the live broadcast that were not present in the original Broadway production: "Count On Christmas" and "In the Market for a Miracle". In addition, three songs from the Broadway production were cut or reworked. "Overture" and "Parker Family Singalong" were both cut, while "Act One Finale" was reworked as "Ralphie's Nightmare". The song "Up on Santa's Lap" was included in the television broadcast but not included on the A Christmas Story Live! album.

Opening number

- "Count On Christmas" (Note: Song was written specifically for the television production.) – Bebe Rexha

Act I

- "It All Comes Down to Christmas" – Ralphie, The Parkers and Ensemble
- "Red Ryder Carbine Action BB Gun" – Ralphies
- "The Genius on Cleveland Street" – The Old Man and Mother
- "When You're a Wimp" – Kids
- "Ralphie to the Rescue" – Ralphie, Miss Shields, The Parkers and Ensemble
- "What a Mother Does" – Mother
- "A Major Award" – The Old Man, Mother and Neighbors
- "Ralphie's Nightmare" – The Parkers
- "In the Market for a Miracle" – Mrs. Schwartz, Ralphie, Schwartz, Ensemble

Act 2

- "Sticky Situation" – Kids, Ensemble
- "You'll Shoot Your Eye Out" – Miss Shields and Kids
- "When You're a Wimp (reprise)" – Kids
- "Just Like That" – Mother
- "At Higbee's" – Elves
- "Up on Santa's Lap" – Santa, Elves, Ralphie, Randy and Kids
- "Before the Old Man Comes Home" – Ralphie and Randy
- "Somewhere Hovering Over Indiana" – Ralphie, Randy and Kids
- "Red Rider (reprise #3)" – Ralphie and The Old Man
- "Ralphie to the Rescue (reprise)" – Ralphie and Ensemble
- "A Christmas Story" – The Parkers and Full Company

== Production ==
The production was based on A Christmas Story: The Musical, which in turn was based on the 1983 film. Marc Platt reprised his role as co-executive producer from the live television musical of Grease: Live (2016), joined by Adam Siegel, and television director Alex Rudzinski and theatrical director Scott Ellis. It was broadcast from the Warner Brothers Studios in Burbank, California, primarily using outdoor sets. Ellis noted that emphasis on the "feeling of family" was an important aspect of the production, as "it's not just razzle-dazzle stuff and big musical numbers. Our challenge is to never lose sight of the family aspect. And I think — I hope — we've succeeded in that". Songwriting duo Pasek & Paul, who wrote the songs for A Christmas Story: The Musical, wrote three new songs for the production, including "In the Market for a Miracle" for Mrs. Schwartz, "Ralphie's Nightmare" for the Parker family, and the opening theme "Count on Christmas".

Pasek noted that the team had to try to maintain a balance between preserving the familiar and iconic aspects of the film, while also expanding upon it through its musical format. He explained that "there are certain moments where we want to stay true to what people remember and then there's other moments where we have permission to do what only musical theater can do and turn the dad's fantasy into a tap dancing number". Platt remarked that, when working on a project such as this, "you prepare for the unknown. That's what makes live TV exciting. There are certain things that happen that you can't anticipate".

Unlike previous years, NBC did not broadcast a live musical for the 2017 holiday season; while it did plan to produce a version of Bye Bye Birdie executive-produced by and starring Jennifer Lopez, it was delayed and eventually abandoned. The broadcast ultimately competed against ABC's annual presentation of the film The Sound of Music, as well as NBC's Sunday Night Football between the Dallas Cowboys and Oakland Raiders.

During the special, Fox also broadcast a live, 2-and-a-half-minute commercial for The Greatest Showman, a then-upcoming musical film that also featured songs written by Pasek and Paul. The spot, which was directed by Michael Gracey and Beth McCarthy-Miller, and also simulcast on Facebook, featured a performance of the number "Come Alive" with the film's stars Hugh Jackman, Zac Efron, Keala Settle, and Zendaya. The presentation was billed as the first live television commercial for a film.

Matthew Broderick, who served as the adult Ralphie, coincidentally had previous ties to the material, as his father James Broderick had played Ralphie's father The Old Man in two television films prior to A Christmas Story.

== Reception ==
=== Critical response ===
A Christmas Story Live! received generally negative reviews, with the general audience reacting more harshly than professional critics. On Rotten Tomatoes, the production received a 43% rating based on 14 reviews. The show's three-hour length and musical numbers drew the most negative reactions, as Fox did not promote the program as a musical, and the lavish Broadway musical numbers were perceived to clash with the story's Midwestern setting. However, most of the individual actors' performances were positively received, as were the technical aspects of the special (such as scene and wardrobe changes).

The Los Angeles Times praised the performers: "...Matthew Broderick, who found his own, gentler way through Shepherd's pointy prose...Maya Rudolph was affecting as Ralphie's mother, Chris Diamantopoulos gruff if less than epic as his father, the Old Man...Andy Walken was a good visual match for the movie's Peter Billingsley,...The whole company of kids, in fact, was energetic and on their marks,... Schwartz's mother, previously an offended voice on the other end of a phone call, was here gloriously embodied by Ana Gasteyer, who brought in a Hanukkah theme..." but noted that "...the virtues that have made the movie a seasonal perennial were somewhat swallowed by the narrative digressions and showstopping gestures of the musical".

=== Ratings ===
The overnight Nielsen ratings were a 2.8 rating/5 share with 4.52 million viewers, as compared to the Fox network live telecast of Grease: Live in January 2016, which earned a 7.4 overnight and 12 million viewers.

Fox reran A Christmas Story Live! in an edited two-hour time slot December 24, 2019. This telecast earned 1.11 million viewers, a 0.3 overnight rating and a 2 share. The rerun was also notable for going up against the original film in the first airing of its annual marathon on TBS; the original drew more than twice the number of viewers.

=== Awards and nominations ===
Accolades for A Christmas Story Live!
| Award | Category | Nominee(s) | Result |
|---|---|---|---|
| 70th Primetime Emmy Awards | Outstanding Original Music and Lyrics | Benj Pasek and Justin Paul (for "In the Market for a Miracle") | Nominated |
| 34th Artios Awards | Outstanding Achievement in Casting – Live Television Performance, Variety or Sketch Comedy | Bernard Telsey, Tiffany Little Canfield, Rachel Hoffman, & Rachel Dill (Associate) | Nominated |

== See also ==
- 2017 in American television
- List of Christmas television specials
