= Itsy Bitsy (film) =

2019 film by Micah Gallo

- Theatrical release poster
- Directed by: Micah Gallo
- Written by: Jason Alvino; Bryan Dick; Micah Gallo
- Story by: Micah Gallo
- Starring: Bruce Davison; Elizabeth Roberts; Denise Crosby; Arman Darbo; Chloe Perrin
- Cinematography: Marcos Durian; James Zsigmond
- Edited by: Matt Latham
- Music by: Garry Schyman; Frederik Wiedmann
- Production companies: Hacienda Film Co. Paradox Film Group; Strange Vision
- Distributed by: Shout! Studios
- Release dates: August 10, 2019 (Popcorn Frights Film Festival); August 30, 2019 (United States)
- Running time: 94 minutes
- Country: United States
- Language: English

Itsy Bitsy is a 2019 American horror film directed by Micah Gallo, starring Bruce Davison, Elizabeth Roberts, Arman Darbo, and Chloe Perrin, and featuring Denise Crosby, Eileen Dietz, and Matty Cardarople. It centers on a family, who moves into an old, secluded mansion where they are stalked by an ancient entity that takes the form of a giant spider. The film itself was inspired by the poem The Itsy Bitsy Spider, and was released in the United States on August 30, 2019, by Shout! Studios, and it has received mixed reviews from critics.

== Plot ==
Live-in nurse Kara and her two children Jesse and Cambria have moved into the home of artifact collector and widower Walter Clark, who has recently purchased a fabled artifact, the ‘Black Egg of Maa-Kalaratri'. During the purchase Clark angered the treasure hunter, who returns to the home and smashes the relic. This releases a large prehistoric spider, which bites the treasure hunter, who manages to make it off the property before dying.

The move has been difficult for Kara, as she blames herself for the death of her son Stevie from a car accident where she was the driver. She is also hiding a secret drug addiction. To calm herself and deal with visions of her son Stevie, Kara steals Walter's OxyContin but still experiences a nervous breakdown in a diner. She is reassured by and bonds with Sheriff Jane Dunne, who notices Kara's addiction.

Jesse begins to bond with Walter and the two piece together the relic. Walter also entertains the boy by telling him the legend of Maa-Kalaratri, an ancient spider goddess who became vengeful when people stopped worshipping her. As he is having fun, Jesse neglects to watch Cambria, who is nearly attacked by the spider. This is discovered by Kara, causing a fight between her and Jesse, during which he reveals that Kara had been fired for stealing medication from her last job.

Kara's theft is eventually discovered and she is fired by Walter. She leaves, at which point the spider attacks and kills Walter. Jane responds to reports of his death after Jesse discovers the body. She questions Kara, who believes that it may have something to do with the treasure hunter while Jesse believes that it was Maa-Kalaratri. Kara later scolds Jesse for scaring Cambria and slaps him, an act she quickly regrets.

Later that night Kara investigates the attic, discovering Jesse freeing Cambria from thick spider webs. They discover an empty exoskeleton shed by the spider and flee the attic, at which point the spider attacks and bites Kara, who passes out from the venom. Jesse manages to call Jane for help but is unable to prevent the spider from biting Cambria's hand before seemingly knocking it unconscious. Kara awakens and finds that the spider bit clean through the child's hand and was unable to inject any venom. She manages to administer an epinephrine shot on herself to counteract the spider venom before passing out once more.

Jesse is attacked, and narrowly avoids being bitten before Kara reawakens in time to kill the spider. The trio escape and as Jane arrives with an ambulance, Kara collapses and sees a vision of Stevie. She then finally forgives herself for his death by saving Jesse and Cambria, taking away her need to use drugs. After recovering, Kara and the children move out and swear to stay together no matter what. Unbeknownst to them, however, the spider laid two egg sacs in Walter's house, one in a dollhouse and one in a chest, both of which begin to hatch.

== Cast ==
- Bruce Davison as Walter
- Denise Crosby as Sheriff Jane
- Elizabeth Roberts as Kara
- Arman Darbo as Jesse
- Chloe Perrin as Cambria
- Treva Etienne as Ahkeeba
- Eileen Dietz as Sally
- Matty Cardarople as Donny
- Grace Shen as Storyteller Priestess

== Release ==
On April 8, 2019, it was announced that Shout! Studios acquired the North American distribution rights to the film. The film was released in select theatres, digital and on VOD on August 30, 2019.

== Reception ==
Itsy Bitsy received mixed reviews from critics upon its release, with many praising the special effects, cinematography, and atmosphere while criticizing the film's uninteresting characters, and story.

On Rotten Tomatoes the film has an approval rating of 64% based on reviews from 11 critics, with an average rating of 5.5/10.

Matthew Roe of Film Threat gave the film a negative review, writing "Itsy Bitsy has some fantastic human moments inside its bland monster facade and is the only real reason I can recommend the film – however, for some it won’t be enough to redeem the played-out and wonky elements." Culture Crypt rated the film a score of 55 out of 100, criticizing its underwritten characters, script, and finale. The reviewer concluded, "Itsy Bitsy isn’t going to win any awards or become anyone’s favorite film. It’s too grim to grab the gusto it needs to stand out without edging into over-the-top outrageousness. But it is professionally produced, features a few intriguing pops, and makes for a decent diversion during a weekend’s entertainment." Veronique Englebert from The Review Geek scored the film a mixed 5.5 out of 10, writing, "Itsy Bitsy is not a bad spider movie but it’s not a particularly great one either. It fails to reach the same creepiness found in movies like Arachnophobia and takes a while to get into the swing of things. However, the welcome practical effects and empathetic characters help but can’t quite save the day for this average creature feature."

Meagan Navarro from Bloody Disgusting commended the film's special effects and camerawork; but criticized the sparse appearance of its antagonist, unresolved ending, and unlikable characters. Concluding her review, Navarro recommended the film based on the special effect, in spite of its faults, calling it "a big step in the right direction". Noel Murray of the Los Angeles Times gave the film a positive review, praising the film's gothic atmosphere, special effects, and "existential dread".
