= Kristi Reed =

American casting director, voice director and writer (born 1971)

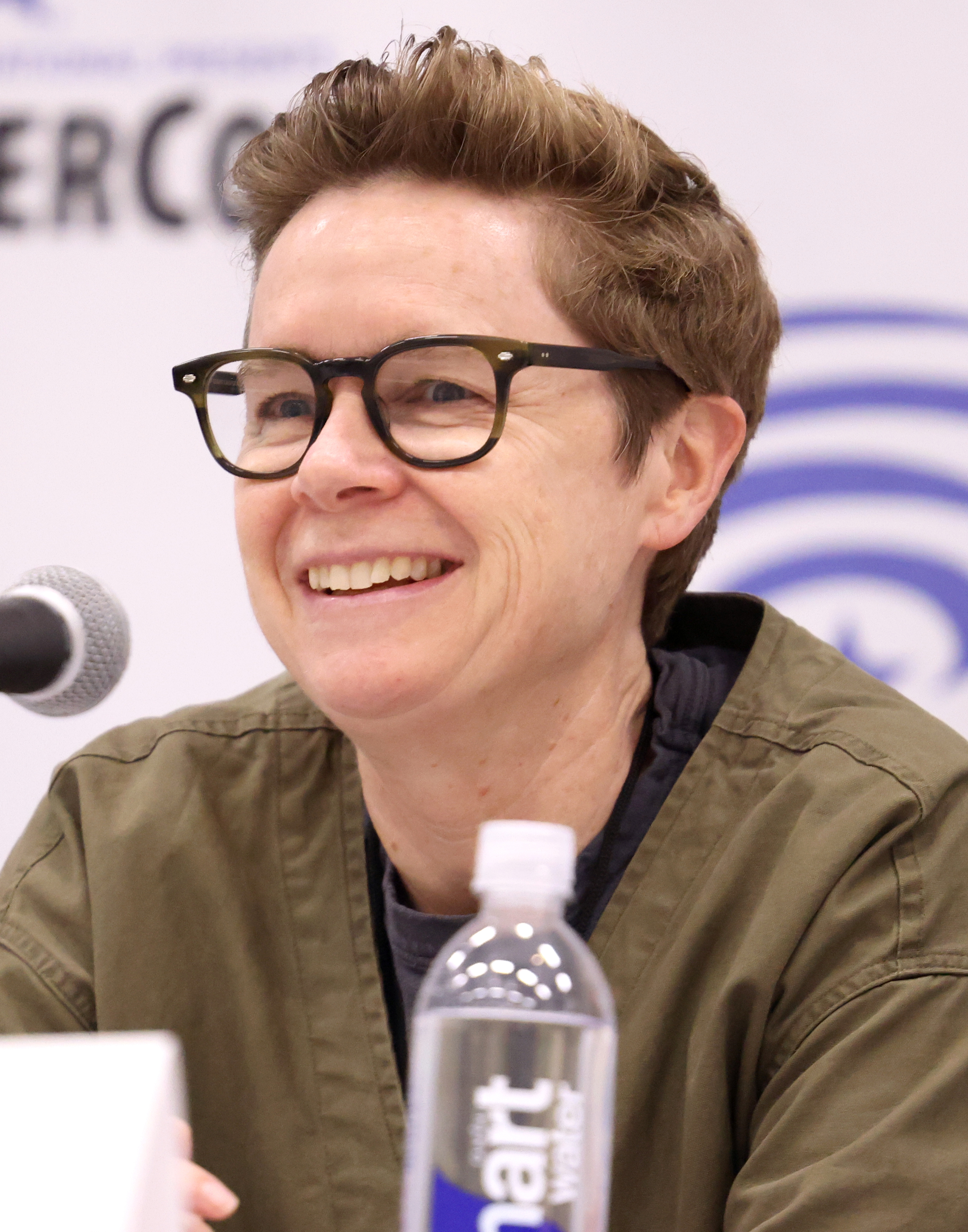
Reed at the 2026 WonderCon

Kristi Reed (born September 3, 1971) is an American casting director, voice director and writer based in Los Angeles, CA.

== Early life and career ==
Kristi Reed is a voice director for TV series, films, and shorts and video games. She started her career at Bang Zoom! Entertainment in 2002 and 2015 began working on projects at Cartoon Network.

Chris Nee, Kristi Reed, and Jeremy Blacklow co-founded The Rainbow Project, a non-profit LGBT organization, which honors queer presentation in children's media with the Velma Awards.

Reed has been nominated for an Emmy five times and in 2022 won an Emmy Award for Outstanding Voice Directing for an Animated Series for Centaurworld.

In 2025, Kristi Reed served as a voice director on the show StuGo.

== Filmography ==
She is best known for Over the Garden Wall, Infinity Train (2019) and Kipo and the Age of Wonderbeasts (2020)

=== As a voice director ===
- Accel World
- Adventure Time: Fionna & Cake
- Adventure Time: Distant Lands
- The Adventures of Rocky and Bullwinkle (6 episodes)
- Argento Soma
- Avatar: Seven Havens
- Bunnicula (seasons 1–2)
- Centaurworld
- Charlotte's Web
- Clarence
- Curses!
- Dead End: Paranormal Park
- Doraemon (2005)
- Fast & Furious Spy Racers
- Fate/stay night: Unlimited Blade Works
- The Fungies!
- Ghost Slayers Ayashi
- Goldie
- Gremlins: Secrets of the Mogwai
- Harvey Girls Forever! (seasons 1–3)
- I Heart Arlo
- Infinity Train
- Kipo and the Age of Wonderbeasts
- KPop Demon Hunters
- Last Exile
- Little Ellen
- Max & the Midknights
- Merry Little Batman
- Oblivion Island: Haruka and the Magic Mirror
- OK K.O.! Let's Be Heroes
- Over the Garden Wall
- Pantheon
- Persona 4: The Animation
- Regular Show: The Lost Tapes
- Rock Paper Scissors (10 episodes)
- The Second Best Hospital in the Galaxy
- Skylanders Academy (season 1)
- Strange Planet
- Strawberry Vampire
- StuGo
- Summer Camp Island
- Tales of the Teenage Mutant Ninja Turtles (season 2)
- Tekken: Blood Vengeance
- Transformers: EarthSpark
- Vampirina (seasons 1–2)
- We Bare Bears
