= Tim Doyle =

American television producer and writer

- Born: October 3, 1959 (age 66); Los Angeles, California, U.S.
- Occupations: Television producer, television writer
- Years active: 1987–present
- Spouse: Ellen Svaco (m. 1997)
- Children: 1

Tim Doyle (born October 3, 1959) is an American television producer and television writer. His credits include Dinosaurs, Roseanne, Grace Under Fire, Ellen, Sports Night, Still Standing, The Big Bang Theory, Better Off Ted, Rules of Engagement, Last Man Standing, and creator of The Kids Are Alright.

Doyle grew up in Glendale, California. He is married to Ellen Svaco Doyle. They have one child together.

Doyle created The Kids Are Alright, an American sitcom television series that premiered on October 16, 2018, on ABC. The series is semi-autobiographical, following a Catholic family with eight sons in the Los Angeles area during the early 1970s. Although lasting only one season this series earned strong critical reviews, a 97% on Rotten Tomatoes and a 2019 Best Comedy Episode nomination from the Writers Guild of America for its pilot script by Doyle. All 23 episodes are currently streaming on Hulu.

He is an alumnus of Bellarmine-Jefferson High School and USC School of Cinematic Arts.

Doyle has gained a reputation as a sitcom "showrunner" brought in when the original showrunners have been fired from troubled shows, helping the series to recover and accumulate enough episodes for syndication.

Doyle is also widely credited with originating the term "bay leaf", a term of art in television comedy. A bay leaf is material written into a script with the explicit intention that it would be removed later, either in subsequent drafts or in editing of the finished episode. Bay leaves are generally used to address unwanted network and studio notes, the "heavy-handed suggestions given by studio executives".

== Filmography ==
=== Film ===
Film appearances and works by Tim Doyle
| Year | Title | Role | Notes |
|---|---|---|---|
| 1987 | Zombie High | Writer | |
| 1990 | Road Lawyers and Other Briefs | Writer, God (segment "Escape From Heaven"), director | |
| 1990 | The Natural History of Parking Lots | Teacher | |
| 1994 | The Shaggy Dog | Teleplay | TV movie |
| 1994 | Future Shock | Marshall | |
| 1995 | The Barefoot Executive | Teleplay | TV movie |
| 1998 | Ellen: A Tribute to Hollywood | Writer | Documentary |
| 1999 | Sagamore | Executive producer | TV movie |
| 2001 | Straight White Male | Executive producer, writer | TV movie |
| 2002 | The Greg Giraldo Show | Executive producer | Short |
| 2003 | Stuck in the Middle with You | Executive producer | TV movie |
| 2005 | Don't Ask | Executive producer | TV movie |
| 2016 | The Fluffy Shop | Executive producer, writer | TV movie |
| 2017 | Charlie Foxtrot | Executive producer | TV movie |

=== Television ===
Television appearances and works by Tim Doyle
| Year | Title | Role | Notes |
|---|---|---|---|
| 1991–1994 | Dinosaurs | Producer, co-producer, writer (1991–1994), teleplay (1991–1993), General Chow (voice), executive script consultant, story editor | 1 episode, 1 episode, 9 episodes, 3 episodes, 1 episode "When Food Goes Bad", 3 episodes (1992–1993), 1 episode "Frank Live" |
| 1994 | Herman's Head | Writer | 1 episode "Once More with Feeling" |
| 1994 | Thunder Alley | Writer | 2 episodes "Bloodsuckers", "Chore Patrol" |
| 1994–1995 | Roseanne | Producer, supervising producer, writer | 25 episodes, 1 episode, 2 episodes "Happy Trailer", "Sleeper" |
| 1995–1997 | Grace Under Fire | Supervising producer, executive producer, writer | 25 episodes (1995–1996), 23 episodes (1996–1997), 2 episodes |
| 1997–1998 | Ellen | Executive producer, writer | 21 episodes, 2 episodes "Ellen: A Hollywood Tribute: Part 1 & 2" |
| 1998 | Sports Night | Consulting producer | 4 episodes |
| 2000 | Jesse | Creative consultant | 5 episodes |
| 2001 | Bob Patterson | Executive producer, teleplay | 1 episode "Pilot" |
| 2000–2001 | The Trouble with Normal | Co-executive producer | 11 episodes |
| 2002–2003 | Andy Ritcher Controls the Universe | Co-executive producer, writer | 9 episodes, 1 episode "Wedding" |
| 2005 | Jake in Progress | Consulting producer | 3 episodes |
| 2003–2006 | Still Standing | Executive producer, writer | 12 episodes, 1 episode "Still Our Little Boy" |
| 2007–2008 | Aliens in America | Executive producer | 17 episodes |
| 2008–2009 | The Big Bang Theory | Consulting producer, teleplay, story | 23 episodes, 3 episodes, 1 episode "The Panty Pinata Polarization" |
| 2009–2010 | Better Off Ted | Co-executive producer, writer | 13 episodes, 2 episodes "Mess of a Salesman", "The Lawyer, the Lemur, and the Little Listener" |
| 2010–2012 | Rules of Engagement | Co-executive producer, executive producer, writer | 24 episodes (2010–2012), 12 episodes (2011–2012), 5 episodes |
| 2012 | Breaking In | Consulting producer, writer | 13 episodes, 1 episode "The Hungover" |
| 2012–2015 | Last Man Standing | Executive producer, writer, director | 42 episodes, 3 episodes "Outdoor Man Grill", "Stud Muffin", "Voting", 2 episodes "Vanessa Fixes Up Eve", "Mutton Busting" |
| 2016 | The Real O'Neals | Consulting producer | 7 episodes |
| 2016 | Dr. Ken | Consulting producer, writer | 4 episodes, 2 episodes "A Park Family Christmas", "Ken and Allison Share A Patient" |
| 2017 | Imaginary Mary | Consulting producer | 2 episodes |
| 2017 | Speechless | Consulting producer, writer | 8 episodes, 1 episode "B-R-I-- BRITISH I-N-V-- INVASION" |
| 2018 | The Kids Are Alright | Executive producer, creator, writer, narrator (voice-over) | 23 episodes |
| 2019 | Schooled | Showrunner, executive producer | 13 episodes |
