= Kung Fu Man =

- Traditional Chinese: 功夫俠
- Simplified Chinese: 功夫侠
- Hanyu Pinyin: Gōngfū Xiá
- Directed by: Yuen Cheung-yan; Ning Ying
- Screenplay by: Tiger Chen; Wang Qian; Zhang Daxing
- Produced by: Han Sanping; Li Shaohong; Jimmy Lui; Li Xiaowan; Zhang Daxing
- Starring: Tiger Chen; Jiang Mengjie; Arman Darbo; Chyna Mccoy; Vanessa Branch
- Cinematography: Sean O'Dea
- Edited by: Li Tung-Chuen; Zhou Ying
- Production companies: Beijing Rongxinda Film and Television art co., LTD; China Film Group Corporation
- Distributed by: Inlook Media; China Film Group Corp Beijing Film Studio
- Release dates: June 1, 2012 (United States); July 19, 2013 (China)
- Running time: 90 minutes
- Countries: China; United States
- Languages: Mandarin; English

Kung Fu Man, also known as Kung Fu Hero, is a 2012 Chinese–American Kung Fu film. This film was directed by Yuen Cheung-yan and Ning Ying and produced by Keanu Reeves, and starring Tiger Chen, Jiang Mengjie, Arman Darbo, Chyna Mccoy and Vanessa Branch.

== Plot ==
It tells the story of the Chinese Kung Fu Man Chen Ping who protects a young boy named "Christophe" from his kidnappers.

== Cast ==
- Tiger Chen as Chen Ping, the Kung Fu Man.
- Jiang Mengjie as Liu Jie, an English teacher in a local school.
- Arman Darbo as Christophe, the boy who was kidnapped.
- Yuen Cheung-yan as Wu San
- Vanessa Branch as the main members of the kidnapping group.
- Igor Darbo as the main members of the kidnapping group.
- Andre McCoy as the main members of the kidnapping group.
- Lin Shen as Liu Jie's boyfriend.

== Production ==
The film was shot in Dali City, Yunnan Province, China.

The film fared poorly at the box office.
