= Tiger Chen =

Chinese martial artist and stuntperformer

- 陈虎
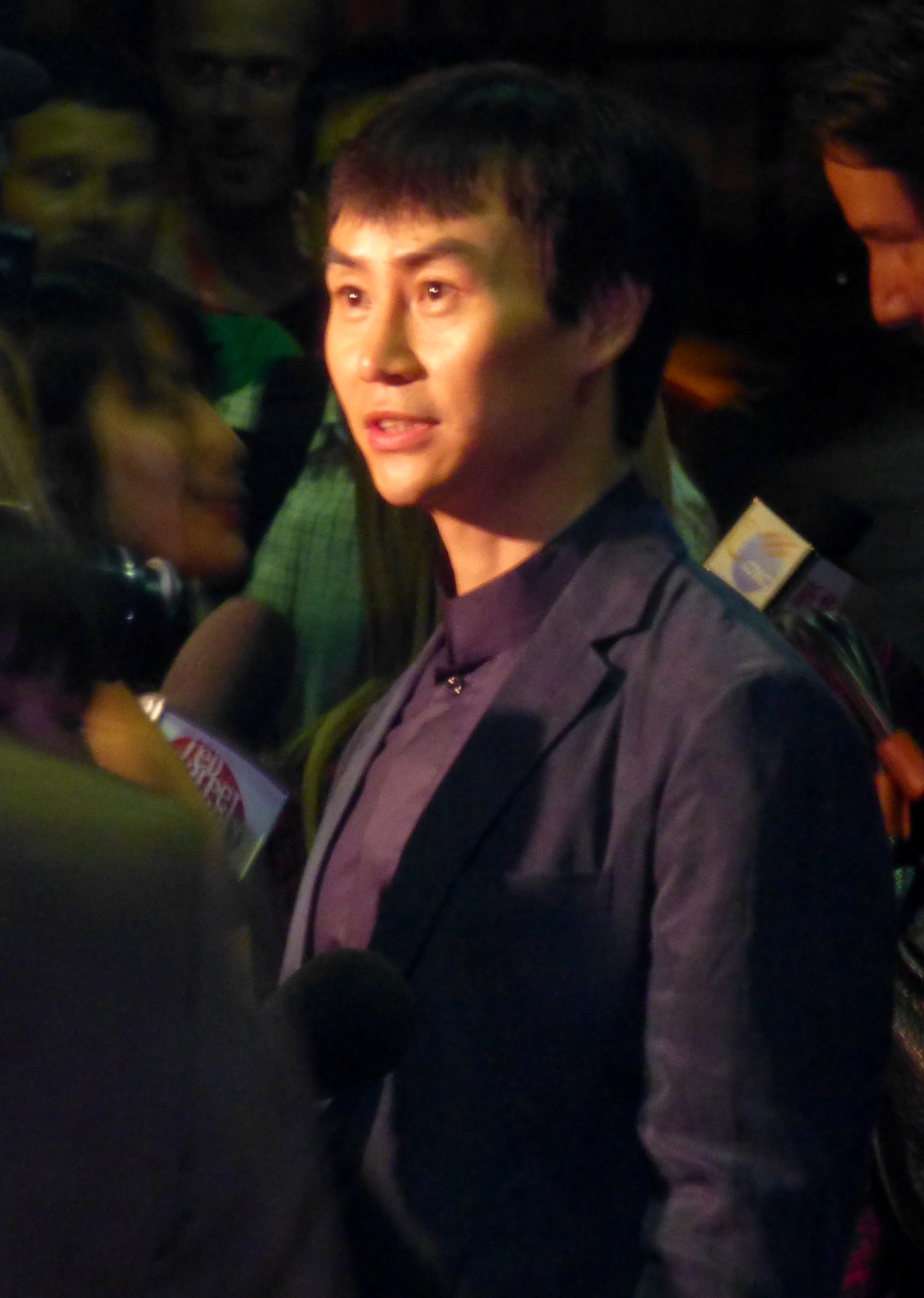
- Chen at the premiere of Man of Tai Chi, Toronto Film Festival 2013
- Born: 3 March 1975 (age 51); Chengdu, Sichuan, China
- Occupations: Actor, stuntman, martial artist
- Years active: 1998–present
- Notable work: Man of Tai Chi; Kung Fu Man
- Awards: Champion of National Youth Martial Arts Competition; All Around Champion of San Francisco International Martial Arts Tournament; Champion of National Karate (Men's -60kg)

Tiger Chen (simplified Chinese: 陈虎; traditional Chinese: 陳虎; pinyin: Chén Hǔ; born March 3, 1975) is a Chinese martial artist, stuntman and actor. Chen is Yuen Woo Ping's protege and Keanu Reeves's teacher and friend. He was also Uma Thurman's stunt double.

== Life ==
=== Early life ===
Chen was born on March 3, 1975 in Chengdu, Sichuan, where he studied the Chinese martial arts. By age 18, he enrolled into Sichuan Wushu Team. He won the National Youth Martial Arts Competition in China.

At the age of 19, Chen went to the United States. He lived in a small wooden shack behind a shopping plaza in Gloucester Township, New Jersey. There he taught tai chi and weapons classes to the students of the Tang Soo Karate Academy which was located in the plaza. He said: "In China, at least you can practice kung fu and attend martial arts competitions, but in the United States, you will find that most of your time in washing the dishes and being a porter." Chen became a student of Hong Kong martial artist Yuen Woo-ping in 2000s.

=== Film career ===
In 1998, Chen began his film career by holding a post on the fight choreography team as an assistant under Yuen in The Matrix, a science fiction action film starring Keanu Reeves, Laurence Fishburne, Carrie-Anne Moss, Hugo Weaving and Joe Pantoliano. At the same time, he became best friends with Keanu Reeves. Chen also held the post of choreographer in Charlie's Angels (2000), Once in the Life (2000) and Kill Bill: Volume 1 (2003).

Chen had a minor role as a ronin in The Matrix Reloaded (2003), the second film of the Matrix trilogy. In 2005, he appeared as a martial artist in House of Fury with Anthony Wong, Gillian Chung, Stephen Fung and Charlene Choi.

In 2012, Chen played the lead role in Kung Fu Man, alongside Vanessa Branch and Jiang Mengjie.

After years in minor and supporting roles, Chen played the titular character in Man of Tai Chi, opposite the film's director Keanu Reeves, Karen Joy Morris and Yam Tat-wah.

In 2018, Chen made a special appearance in the Malaysian military film PASKAL: The Movie as a Chinese UN Observer accompanying the Malaysian UN Observers during a mission in Angola.

In 2019, Chen co-starred with Tony Jaa and Iko Uwais in the film Triple Threat. He also has an uncredited cameo as a Triad assassin in the film John Wick: Chapter 3 – Parabellum.

== Works ==
=== Film ===
Year	English Title	Chinese Title	Role	Notes
1999	The Matrix	黑客帝国		Choreographer
2000	Charlie's Angels	霹雳娇娃		Choreographer
2000	Once in the Life	一生一次	Chino	
2003	Kill Bill: Volume 1	杀死比尔		Choreographer
2003	The Matrix Reloaded	黑客帝国2：重装上阵	Ronin	
2005	House of Fury	精武家庭	Martial artist	
2012	Kung Fu Man	功夫侠	Chen Ping	
2013	Man of Tai Chi	太极侠	Chen Linhu	
2015	Monk Comes Down the Mountain	道士下山		
2016	Revenge of Gold	流金		
2017	Kung Fu Traveler	功夫机器侠	Chen Wu/General Chen	
2017	Kung Fu Traveler 2	功夫机器侠2	A Jie/General Chen	
2017	Romantic Assassin			
2018	PASKAL: The Movie		Sgt. Chen Han	Malaysian Produced with Royal Malaysian Navy and Special Appearance
2019	Triple Threat		Long Fei	
2019	John Wick: Chapter 3 – Parabellum		Triad	Uncredited Cameo
2019	Special Forces King 3			
2021	The Matrix Resurrections		M.O.T.C	
2024	Agent 86		Liu	
2025	Wick Is Pain		Himself	Documentary Film

== Awards ==
- Champion of National Youth Martial Arts Competition
- All Around Champion of San Francisco International Martial Arts Tournament
- Champion of National Karate (Men's -60 kg)
- World Stunt Awards nominations for Matrix 2

== See also ==
- Zoë Bell, Uma Thurman's other stunt double
