= The Kids Are Alright (TV series) =

American television sitcom

- Genre: Sitcom
- Created by: Tim Doyle
- Starring: Mary McCormack; Jack Gore; Sam Straley; Caleb Foote; Sawyer Barth; Christopher Paul Richards; Andy Walken; Santino Barnard; Tim Doyle; Michael Cudlitz; Sawyer Laucius; Jax Laucius
- Narrated by: Tim Doyle
- Composer: Siddhartha Khosla
- Country of origin: United States
- Original language: English
- No. of seasons: 1
- No. of episodes: 23

Production
- Executive producers: Tim Doyle; Randall Einhorn
- Producer: Kris Eber
- Cinematography: Craig Kief
- Editor: Casey Brown
- Camera setup: Single-camera
- Production companies: Mr. Bigshot Fancy-Pants Productions Inc.; ABC Studios

Original release
- Network: ABC
- Release: October 16, 2018 – May 21, 2019

The Kids Are Alright is an American television sitcom created by Tim Doyle for ABC, inspired by Doyle's own childhood. The series is a single-camera comedy about an Irish Catholic family raising eight sons in suburban Los Angeles from 1972 to 1973, navigating the trials and tribulations of the era.

The series stars Michael Cudlitz and Mary McCormack as parents Mike and Peggy Cleary, with Jack Gore, Sam Straley, Caleb Foote, Sawyer Barth, Christopher Paul Richards, Andy Walken, and Santino Barnard starring as their first seven sons. The series received a put pilot commitment at ABC in September 2017, with a pilot ordered in January 2018. The Kids Are Alright was ordered to series by ABC in May 2018, and it was picked up for a full season of 22 episodes in November 2018. ABC ordered an additional episode in December 2018, bringing the order to 23 episodes. Filming for the series took place primarily in the Van Nuys area of Los Angeles.

The series premiered on October 16, 2018, and received generally positive reviews, a 2019 Best Comedy Episode nomination from the Writers Guild of America for its pilot script, and a 97% on Rotten Tomatoes. Despite these accolades, on May 10, 2019, ABC canceled the series after one season.

== Cast and characters ==
=== Main ===
- Mary McCormack as Peggy Cleary, mother
- Michael Cudlitz as Mike Cleary, father
- Jack Gore as Timmy, fifth son
- Sam Straley as Lawrence, first son
- Caleb Foote as Eddie, second son
- Sawyer Barth as Frank (Francis), third son
- Christopher Paul Richards as Joey, fourth son
- Andy Walken as William, sixth son
- Santino Barnard as Pat (Patrick), seventh son
- Sawyer and Jax Laucius as Andy, eighth son, an infant
- Tim Doyle as the narrator, voice of adult Timmy

=== Recurring ===
- Kennedy Lea Slocum as Wendi Falkenberry, Eddie's girlfriend
- Paul Dooley as Father Cecil Dunne
- Markie Post as Helen Portello, Peggy's friend and nemesis
- Jojo Nwoko as Father Bootaan Abdi
- Thomas Barbusca as Davey, Joey's best friend
- Michael Cornacchia as Boxcar Benji
- Sarah Benoit as Sister Euphemia
- Martha Boles as Jenny, Wendi's classmate
- Galadriel Stineman as Fiona, Lawrence's girlfriend

=== Guest ===
- Aidan Wallace as young Lawrence
- Gracen Newton as young Eddie
- Connor Cain as Bobby (S1, E5)
- Nat Faxon as Tom, Peggy's brother (S1, E8)
- Ken Jeong as Grover Young, Mike's co-worker (S1, E9)
- Dara Renee as Melissa, Wendy's classmate (S1, E10)
- Jason Rogel as Mailman
- David Alan Smith as The Great Pepe (S1, E12)
- Ray Porter as Ernie (S1, E15)
- Danny Bonaduce as Boris and Danny Partridge (archive footage) (S1, E17)
- Emma Meisel as Angela, Frank's love interest (S1, E20)
- Josh McDermitt as Mr. Crane, Mike's boss (S1, E21)
- Jeff Holman as Terry, Mike's co-worker (S1, E21)
- Mary Passeri as Marybeth (S1, E21)
- Jim Meskimen as Johnny Carson (voice) (S1, E21)
- Hal Alpert as Mr. Franklin (S1, E20)
- Jo Farkas as Rita (S1, E20)
- Carol Gutierrez as Darlene (S1, E20)
- Regan Burns as Tex O'Shaughnessy (S1, E22)
- Nancy Berggren as Mrs. Ava Greenblatt (S1, E22)
- Jenny O'Hara as Aunt Tess (S1, E22)
- Willie Tyler as himself (S1, E23)

== Episodes ==
No.	Title	Directed by	Written by	Original release date	Prod. code	U.S. viewers (millions)
1	"Pilot"	Randall Einhorn	Tim Doyle	October 16, 2018	101	6.52
2	"Timmy's Poem"	Randall Einhorn	Lisa K. Nelson	October 23, 2018	102	5.08
3	"Microwave"	Randall Einhorn	Rob Ulin	October 30, 2018	104	5.39
4	"Peggy's Day Out"	Matt Sohn	Tom Hertz	November 13, 2018	105	4.60
5	"Boxing"	Randall Einhorn	Jim Brandon & Brian Singleton	November 20, 2018	103	4.22
6	"Behind the Counter"	Matt Sohn	Tom Hertz	November 27, 2018	106	4.58
7	"Little Cyst"	Randall Einhorn	Joey Gutierrez	December 4, 2018	108	4.25
8	"Christmas 1972"	Randall Einhorn	Vijal Patel	December 11, 2018	107	4.23
9	"The Love List"	Jay Karas	Joey Gutierrez	January 8, 2019	111	4.56
10	"Show Boat"	Randall Einhorn	Lisa K. Nelson	January 15, 2019	109	4.21
11	"Mailbox"	Kirk Thatcher	Paul O'Toole & Andy St. Clair	January 22, 2019	110	4.40
12	"Vietnam"	Rebecca Asher	Jeanne Darst	February 5, 2019	113	3.67
13	"Valentine's Day"	Randall Einhorn	Tim Doyle & Ellen Svaco Doyle	February 12, 2019	115	3.20
14	"Happy Cecil"	Bill Purple	Rob Ulin	February 19, 2019	114	3.43
15	"Nine Birthdays"	Randall Einhorn	Ryan Willison	February 26, 2019	112	3.33
16	"Wendi's House"	Rebecca Asher	Tom Hertz	March 19, 2019	116	3.09
17	"Low Expectations"	Bill Purple	Jessica Ambrosetti	March 26, 2019	120	3.01
18	"Peggy Drives Away"	Jay Karas	Paul O'Toole & Andy St. Clair	April 9, 2019	117	2.91
19	"Mass for Shut-ins"	Lea Thompson	Ian Murphy & Riley Ettinger	April 16, 2019	118	3.10
20	"Timmy's New Hobby"	Jay Karas	Emily R. Wilson	April 30, 2019	119	3.28
21	"Mike's Award"	Matt Sohn	Jim Brandon & Brian Singleton	May 7, 2019	121	3.03
22	"Whales"	Victor Nelli	Vijal Patel	May 14, 2019	122	2.85
23	"Irish Goodbye"	Matt Sohn	Joey Gutierrez & Gracie Charters	May 21, 2019	123	2.96

== Production ==
=== Development ===
Series creator Tim Doyle grew up in an Irish Catholic family in Glendale, California, near Los Angeles, in the 1970s, making the show semi-autobiographical. The series is produced by ABC Studios.

ABC officially ordered the series to pilot on January 19, 2018. In February 2018, Randall Einhorn signed on to direct and executive produce the pilot. On May 11, 2018, ABC ordered the show to series and announced that the series would be titled The Kids Are Alright. On November 7, 2018, the series was picked up for a full season of 22 episodes. On December 14, 2018, ABC ordered an additional episode of the first season, bringing the order to 23 episodes.

=== Casting ===
On February 13, 2018, Michael Cudlitz was cast as Mike Dwyer. A few days later, Mary McCormack was cast as Peggy Dwyer. By the end of the month, Sam Straley had joined the cast as Lawrence, along with Caleb Foote as Eddie, Christopher Paul Richards as Joey, and Jack Gore as Timmy. In early March 2018, Sawyer Barth was cast as Frank. That month, it was also revealed that Andy Walken and Santino Barnard had also joined the series. With the series order in May, the family name was changed from the Dwyers to the Clearys.

=== Music ===
Siddhartha Khosla served as the primary composer for the series.

== Broadcast ==
The series premiered on October 16, 2018, on ABC in the United States, and on CTV in Canada.

== Reception ==
=== Ratings ===
Viewership and ratings per episode of The Kids Are Alright
No.	Title	Air date	Rating/share (18–49)	Viewers (millions)	DVR (18–49)	DVR viewers (millions)	Total (18–49)	Total viewers (millions)
1	"Pilot"	October 16, 2018	1.4/6	6.52	0.5	1.49	1.9	8.01
2	"Timmy's Poem"	October 23, 2018	1.1/5	5.08	0.4	1.39	1.4	6.46
3	"Microwave"	October 30, 2018	1.3/6	5.39	0.2	0.99	1.5	6.38
4	"Peggy's Day Out"	November 13, 2018	1.0/5	4.60	0.3	1.10	1.3	5.70
5	"Boxing"	November 20, 2018	0.9/4	4.22	0.3	1.12	1.2	5.34
6	"Behind the Counter"	November 27, 2018	0.9/4	4.58	0.3	1.02	1.2	5.60
7	"Little Cyst"	December 4, 2018	0.8/3	4.25	—N/a	—N/a	—N/a	—N/a
8	"Christmas 1972"	December 11, 2018	0.9/3	4.23	0.3	1.05	1.2	5.28
9	"The Love List"	January 8, 2019	1.0/4	4.56	—N/a	—N/a	—N/a	—N/a
10	"Show Boat"	January 15, 2019	0.8/4	4.21	—N/a	—N/a	—N/a	—N/a
11	"Mailbox"	January 22, 2019	0.8/4	4.40	—N/a	—N/a	—N/a	—N/a
12	"Vietnam"	February 5, 2019	0.7/3	3.67	0.3	1.13	1.1	4.80
13	"Valentine's Day"	February 12, 2019	0.7/3	3.20	0.3	1.07	1.0	4.27
14	"Happy Cecil"	February 19, 2019	0.7/3	3.43	0.3	0.97	1.0	4.40
15	"Nine Birthdays"	February 26, 2019	0.8/4	3.33	0.3	1.00	1.1	4.33
16	"Wendi's House"	March 19, 2019	0.7/3	3.09	0.3	1.06	1.0	4.15
17	"Low Expectations"	March 26, 2019	0.6/3	3.01	0.3	1.08	0.9	4.10
18	"Peggy Drives Away"	April 9, 2019	0.6/3	2.91	0.3	0.97	0.9	3.88
19	"Mass for Shut-ins"	April 16, 2019	0.6/3	3.10	0.3	1.01	0.9	4.11
20	"Timmy's New Hobby"	April 30, 2019	0.7/3	3.28	TBD	TBD	TBD	TBD
21	"Mike's Award"	May 7, 2019	0.6/3	3.03	TBD	TBD	TBD	TBD
22	"Whales"	May 14, 2019	0.6/3	2.85	0.2	1.00	0.8	3.85
23	"Irish Goodbye"	May 21, 2019	0.6/3	2.96	0.2	0.93	0.8	3.77

=== Critical response ===
The review aggregator website Rotten Tomatoes reported an 82% approval rating with an average rating of 6.62/10 based on 17 reviews. The website's consensus reads, "The Kids are Alright is a surprisingly poignant, thoughtful show with a classic sitcom feel." Metacritic, which uses a weighted average, assigned a score of 71 out of 100 based on 7 critics, indicating "generally favorable reviews".

=== Accolades ===
Year	Award	Category	Nominee(s)	Result	Ref.
2019	Writers Guild of America Awards	Episodic Comedy	Tim Doyle for "Pilot"	Nominated	
