= And Then I Go =

- Theatrical release poster
- Directed by: Vincent Grashaw
- Screenplay by: Jim Shepard; Brett Haley
- Based on: Project X by Jim Shepard
- Produced by: Rebecca Green; Laura D. Smith
- Starring: Melanie Lynskey; Justin Long; Arman Darbo; Sawyer Barth
- Cinematography: Patrick Scola
- Edited by: Alan Canant
- Music by: Heather McIntosh
- Production company: Two Flints
- Distributed by: The Orchard
- Release dates: June 16, 2017 (premiere); April 17, 2018 (limited)
- Running time: 99 minutes
- Country: United States
- Language: English

And Then I Go (also known as Triggered) is a 2017 American independent drama film. Adapted from the 2004 novel Project X by Jim Shepard, it is directed by Vincent Grashaw and stars Melanie Lynskey, Justin Long, Arman Darbo, and Sawyer Barth. It began a limited theatrical release in the United States on April 17, 2018, and was released to DVD and streaming in the UK on March 11, 2019 under the alternative title Triggered. The film was roundly praised by critics, who believed it to be a powerful exploration of bullying and school violence.

== Plot ==
Edwin and his only friend, Flake, navigate junior high school while dealing with relentless bullying and self-isolation. While Edwin is more sensitive and quiet, Flake is impulsive and explosive emotionally. There is extreme pressure on both of them, with faculty members and their own parents making assumptions that they are the ones at fault. In truth, the boys are both being bullied and the "fights" are one-sided. Edwin's parents, his father in particular, generally dismiss every remark he makes as petty teenage angst, and only start showing concern when the vice principal of the school invites them for a meeting. During an afterschool hangout at Flake's home, he shows Edwin his father's gun collection, floats the idea to shoot up their school, and Edwin reluctantly agrees out of loyalty to his childhood friend.

While developing the plan, Edwin's artistic ability is noticed by his art teacher, who later encourages him to join an art project to enter a competition. He is approached by two classmate girls who tell him they heard that he had art skills and they wanted him on their team, which he reacts to with a small smile, though Flake, by his side, mocks the girls. Edwin appears to gain self esteem incrementally in the process. However, this whole time, Flake hasn't given up on their "project," and the two are still being targeted for bullying. One afternoon there is a fight between Edwin and Flake at Flake's house which ends up with Edwin bloodied and crying at home. During the period of non-contact afterward, there is visible improvement in Edwin's mood and mental wellbeing. One evening, a man and his son are playing in a field while Edwin watches. Edwin politely asks for them to stop because the boy has Gus's beloved toy ball, but they keep walking, so in a moment of frustration, Edwin curses. The man becomes unreasonably aggressive and shoves Edwin to the ground, and they leave with Gus's ball. This affects Edwin profoundly, and he leans farther toward a mentality of seeking retribution. Flake and Edwin later make up and continue to develop their scheme. At a convenience store, they run into a younger acquaintance named Herman, who is also a target for bullying in the seventh grade for another seventh grader named Budzinski. When Flake unsuccessfully threatens Budzinski to stop, Budzinski targets Herman even more. Sporting a black eye, Herman sullenly tells Edwin, "Someone's got to do something," and voices that he wants to get a gun. This worries Edwin. Flake insists on letting Herman in on the plan.

As the day of the school assembly nears, Edwin's father's birthday is approaching as well. In an effort to connect with her son, Edwin's mother plans a family trip to the lake with a sailboat they used to take for outings. When Edwin hears this will be on the day of the shooting, he is struck with inner turmoil, but Flake threatens him not to back out of the plan. The night before the assembly, Edwin quietly watches over his younger brother, Gus, who he is very fond of, and later on that night goes to the school with Flake to block off the majority of the school doors and store their weapons in their lockers. That morning, he wishes his father good luck on his lecture and receives a reminder from his mother about the lake trip. At school, Flake gives him a quick run-down of their plan again, and urges Edwin to stick to it. Edwin is to go into the bathroom while the students filter into the gym for the assembly, get the duffel with guns, and then head into the gym with Flake. Flake shoots his classmates without hesitation, sending the audience frantically running. Edwin cannot bring himself to raise his gun, however, and Flake is killed by the police while struggling to reload his rifle.

The ending shows a flashback of Edwin and his family at the previously mentioned lake, with voiceover of Edwin relating a story about their having towed another boat to shore. Edwin mentions remembering clearly the joyful expression of the child passenger, while thinking in a paternal manner: "Good for you, kid. Good for you."

== Main cast ==
- Arman Darbo as Edwin Hanratty
- Sawyer Barth as Roddy ("Flake")
- Melanie Lynskey as Janice Hanratty
- Justin Long as Tim Hanratty
- Kannon Hicks as Gus Hanratty
- Melonie Diaz as Ms. Meier
- Tony Hale as Mr. Mosley
- Carrie Preston as Ms. Arnold

== Release ==
And Then I Go made its worldwide premiere at the 2017 Los Angeles Film Festival.

The film was picked up for distribution by The Orchard, and was released theatrically as well as on VOD and Digital HD on April 17, 2018.

== Reception ==
On review aggregator website Rotten Tomatoes, the film holds an approval rating of 92% based on 13 reviews. It has a Metacritic score of 77.

The film received almost unanimous acclaim, with Justin Lowe of The Hollywood Reporter believing it to be "A disturbing drama of teen disaffection," further stating: "Vincent Grashaw's feature provides an essential and insightful perspective that will resonate with audiences attuned to the challenges of adolescence."

Forbes called the film "an uncommonly poignant treatment of adolescence … [it is] less a film about school shootings than one about the crushingly real struggles of youth, struggles that adults quickly forget or make light of, which often just exacerbates the problem. That such difficulties can lead, increasingly, to equally real tragic ends should give any parent or educator pause. We may not be able to stop school shootings once and for all, but recognizing that each one is unique, and likely the product of something far more commonplace than mental illness, might be a place to start."

Entertainment Weekly gave the film a 'B+' rating, with Leah Greenblatt commenting, "What Grashaw does remarkably well, in the movie's harrowing final minutes, is put us entirely inside Edwin's head; not as a sociopath or a killer, just a boy in a world of pain."

In his review for IndieWire, Michael Nordine stated, "We need to talk about this disturbing coming-of-age drama," calling it "an intimate, sympathetic character study."

Bob Strauss of the Los Angeles Daily News felt the film was "a deep, lived-in study of bullied middle school kids who plan to solve their problems in the worst possible way."

== Awards ==
=== New Hampshire Film Festival ===
Year	Nominated work	Category	Result	Ref
2017	Vincent Grashaw	New Hampshire Feature of the Year	Won	

=== Rome International Film Festival, USA ===
Year	Nominated work	Category	Result	Ref
2017	Vincent Grashaw	Best Feature	Won	
2017	Vincent Grashaw	Best Domestic Narrative Feature	Won	
