= Micah Gallo =

- Occupation(s): Director, Writer, Producer and Visual Effects Producer
- Years active: 2006–present

Micah Gallo is an American director, writer and visual effects producer. He is best known for his work on the films Itsy Bitsy and Wick.

== Life and career ==
Micah was raised in Merced, California. He graduated from University of Southern California. In 2010, he directed a short film, Wick, won best director at the Sacramento Horror Film Festival. Her second short film, Massacre Lake, premiered at Hollywood Reel Independent Film Festival.

Micah´s debut feature film Itsy Bitsy, starring Bruce Davison, Denise Crosby and Elizabeth Roberts, premiered at Popcorn Frights Film Festival.

== Filmography ==
| Year | Film | | | | |
| Year | Film | Director | Writer | Producer | Notes |
|---|---|---|---|---|---|
| 2010 | Wick | Yes | Yes | Yes | Short film |
| 2014 | Massacre Lake | Yes | Yes | Yes | Short film |
| 2017 | Andy Dick is Itsy Bitsy | No | Yes | Yes | |
| 2019 | Itsy Bitsy | Yes | Yes | Yes | |

As visual effects producer

- 2006 - Hatchet
- 2009 - The Things We Carry
- 2009 - Devil's Creek
- 2010 - Frozen
- 2010 - The Perfect Host
- 2010 - Angel Camouflaged
- 2010 - Hours Before
- 2010 - A Foundling
- 2010 - Cherry.
- 2010 - Hatchet II
- 2010 - The Psycho Legacy
- 2010 - Old West
- 2011 - Corman's World: Exploits of a Hollywood Rebel
- 2011 - The Innkeepers
- 2011 - A Warrior's Heart
- 2011 - A Proper Violence
- 2011 - The Victim
- 2011 - Brawler
- 2011 - Chillerama
- 2011 - Division III: Football's Finest
- 2011 - Enter Nowhere
- 2011 - The Last Visit
- 2011 - The Contract
- 2011 - Shelf Life
- 2012 - Under the Bed
- 2012 - The Beautiful Game
- 2012 - Big Bad Bugs
- 2012 - Trigger
- 2012 - How Jimmy Got Leverage
- 2012 - Silent Night
- 2013 - Sahasi Chori
- 2013 - Scavengers
- 2013 - Hatchet III
- 2013 - Paranormal Whacktivity
- 2013 - Innocent Blood
- 2013 - Almost Human
- 2013 - The Perfect House
- 2014 - Aftermath
- 2014 - The Quiet Ones
- 2014 - Tentacle 8
- 2019 - Itsy Bitsy
