= Centaurworld =

American animated television series

- Season 1 promotional poster
- Genre: Musical; Comedy drama; Fantasy
- Created by: Megan Dong
- Directed by: Kristi Reed (voice)
- Voices of: Kimiko Glenn; Megan Hilty; Parvesh Cheena; Chris Diamantopoulos; Megan Dong; Josh Radnor; Jessie Mueller
- Theme music composer: Megan Dong
- Composer: Toby Chu
- Country of origin: United States
- Original language: English
- No. of seasons: 2
- No. of episodes: 18

Production
- Executive producer: Megan Dong
- Producer: Louis J. Cuck
- Running time: 25–73 minutes
- Production companies: Sketchshark Productions; Netflix Animation Studios

Original release
- Network: Netflix
- Release: July 30 – December 7, 2021

Centaurworld is an American animated musical fantasy comedy-drama television series created by Megan Dong, with songs by Dong and Dominic Bisignano. Produced by Sketchshark Productions and Netflix Animation, it premiered on Netflix in the United States on July 30, 2021. A second and final season was released on December 7, 2021.

== Synopsis ==
Centaurworld follows a warhorse who is transported from her embattled world to a strange and colorful land inhabited by vibrant, singing centaurs of all species, shapes, and sizes. The first season's story primarily revolves around a quest that the horse embarks on to recollect pieces of a rift key so that she can return home, receiving help from a herd of ragtag centaurs to find and commune with magical shamans guarding each piece. The season culminates when Horse, having opened the dimensional rift to return home, reunites with her human rider while also accidentally unleashing a great evil known as the Nowhere King. Afterwards the second season begins, revolving around the rider and horse respectively working in the two worlds to assemble armies so they could fight the Nowhere King's evergrowing horde of minotaurs.

== Cast and characters ==
=== Main ===
- Kimiko Glenn as Horse, a brave warhorse who is separated from her rider and ends up in the magical dimension called Centaurworld. Horse loses her armour and becomes more cartoonish due to exposure to Centaurworld's atmosphere, though this causes her to have access to magic.
  - Glenn's other voices include a "cataur" (cat centaur) named Madame Jelly who uses a cat piano in the sash competition, the "leaftaur" (leaf centaur) baby, and Horsatia, a wealthy horsetaur whom Horse masquerades as during her trip to the Horsetaur Kingdom.
- Megan Hilty as Wammawink, a motherly alpaca centaur who lived in Centaur Valley before accompanying Horse on her journey. She is initially overprotective of her herd and occasionally goes too far in her protection, but deep down she believes her herd can work on their own.
  - Hilty's other voices include Shar (one of the Glitter Cats), the "leaftaur" mom, a "catfishtaur" (catfish centaur), occasional Moletaur backup singing, and the Killer Whaletaur.
  - Sophia Lewis voices Baby Wammawink.
- Parvesh Cheena as Zulius, a flamboyant and effeminate zebra-like centaur who has the power to magically shapeshift his mane. Zulius also has the ability to slow down time to comment on the current events, which greatly injures everyone around him.
  - Cheena also occasionally performs as part of the Moletaur backup singers in songs they're in.
- Chris Diamantopoulos as Ched, a cynical and belligerent finch-like centaur. He harbors a grudge against Horse, but eventually warms up to her. Additionally, he has a great fear of a creature he calls the "dentist", who allegedly had an affair with his mother during his childhood.
  - Diamantopoulos also voices the "hyenataur" (hyena centaur), Pawter, Zimples, Sean-Anemone, the Rutabagataurs (non-singing), Horsatio (Horsatia's husband), the Narwhaltaur, Moletaur backup in Holes: Part 3, the Leaftaur King, a "gophertaur" (gopher centaur), and Guskin.
  - Roman Engel voices Young Ched.
- Megan Dong as Glendale, a neurotic and kleptomaniacal gerenuk-like centaur who can store an infinite amount of objects in a portal hidden in her stomach.
  - Dong also voices Kale (one of the Glitter Cats), occasional Moletaur backup singing, and "Figure 2", a young human female who tries to steal some apples from Rider.
  - Isabella Russo voices Young Glendale.
- Josh Radnor as Durpleton, a naive and friendly giraffe-like centaur. He is the gentlest of the herd, but tends to act erratically.
  - Andy Walken voices Young Durpleton.
- Jessie Mueller as Rider, a human warrior and Horse's best friend tasked with returning a magical artifact to her general to save the world from an invading horde of minotaurs.
  - Mueller's other roles are Pliptoria, the Moosetaur (Laroub) and the Walrustaur (LaCroiv), McCarpy, and a female soldier.

=== Supporting ===
- Renée Elise Goldsberry as Waterbaby, a hippopotamus-like centaur and one of the shamans in Centaurworld and mentor to Wammawink.
  - Goldsberry also voices the medic in "The Ballad of Becky Apples."
- Tony Hale as Durpletoot, the voice given to Durpleton's flatulence after his wish is granted by the Tree Shamans. The flatulence's purpose is, presumably, to heal Durpleton's childhood trauma.
  - Hale also voices Tony Durpleton, Durpleton's father.
- Carl Faruolo as Gebbrey, a paranoid and emotionally fragile ficus-taur on two legs. He is in constant search of his missing coat, as without it he suffers from extreme cold.
  - Faruolo also voices Barnus (a barnacle with a loud voice), a message bird, a worker man, and Henchman 1.
- Lea Salonga as the Mysterious Woman, a human roaming Centaurworld with magical abilities.
- First Aid Kit as The Tree Shamans, a pair of wish-granting tree-like centaurs who are two of Centaurworld's shamans. They grant the herd not specifically what they want, but what they need, and as such they turn Ched into a horse, make Durpleton's flatulence speak, and help Horse gain backstory magic.
- Flula Borg as Comfortable Doug, a mole-like centaur. He normally does not help the herd and is submissive and often flat-out resents them, much to their displeasure. He often talks in a monotone and is quite submissive. According to Megan Dong, the creation of Comfortable Doug was inspired when a friend said he enjoyed the "comfortable visual style of the show Doug."
  - Borg also voices a message bird in "The Ballad of Becky Apples".
- Paul F. Tompkins as Horse's tail. After Horse was affected by the magic of Centaurworld, it developed sentience and a penchant for wisecracking.
  - Tompkins also voices a human in a flashback with Tail's voice, a Yaktaur and one of the Trashtaurs, the rock music-loving Centaurs created by pollution.
- Santigold as Judge Jacket, a star-nosed mole-like centaur and leader of the mole centaurs. She is one of the shamans in Centaurworld.
- David Johansen as Beartaur, who lives in a cave and makes/collects figurines and dioramas of past battles.
- Fred Armisen as Splendib, a tiger-like centaur.
  - Armisen's other roles include a "cataur" named Bimbam, The Duchess Malangella's psychotic grandson Malandrew, and a message bird in three episodes.
- Adewale Akinnuoye-Agbaje as Johnny Teatime, a kitten-like centaur, one of Centaurworld's shamans.
  - Akinnuoye-Agbaje also voices Zork Presto.
- Jamie Cullum as Sunfish Merguy, a sunfish-like centaur, also called a merman, who runs a boardwalk amusement park.
- Rosalie Craig as the Whaletaur Shaman, the last shaman of Centaurworld.
- Brian Stokes Mitchell as the Nowhere King, an evil, sadistic, and monstrous creature that created the minotaurs to wage war upon the human world and Centaurworld. Mitchell also voices the Elktaur.
- Brian d'Arcy James as The General, the commander of the human forces.
- Dee Bradley Baker as Phillip J. "Stabby" Bonecrunch, a lizard-like monster from the human world.
  - Baker's other roles include the Muskoxtaur (Kwhass-ón), the "puffintaurs" (puffin centaurs), "wormtaurs" (worm centaurs), a "gophertaur", some minotaurs, and Baydenbeast.
- Maria Bamford as The Duchess Malangella, a traditional centaur aristocrat.
  - Bamford also voices the Duchess' Maître d', and the Opossumtaur.
- Colleen Ballinger as Crandy, a "birdtaur" (bird centaur) influencer
  - Ballinger also voices a message bird and the basket woman.
- Scott Hoying as Mouthpiece, a pelican "birdtaur" who is a devoted fan.
- Grey Griffin as Old Man, another "birdtaur" fan.
  - Griffin also voices Bayden, Hanglydangly, and the lone survivor in "The Ballad of Becky Apples".
- Donna Lynne Champlin as the Prairiedogtaur.
- Wendie Malick as Gurple Durpleton, Durpleton's mother
- Fred Tatasciore as Badgertaur
- Dominic Bisignano as "Figure 1," a young human male that tries to steal some apples from Rider. Bisignano also sings as Sunfish Merguy on the soundtrack album.
- A number of different background singers with semi-prominent choir roles:
  - Toby Chu, who also sings for the Rutabagataurs, and the "keytaur" (keytar centaur).
  - Randy Crenshaw
  - Allie Feder
  - Fletcher Sheridan
  - Baraka May
  - Sarah Mann
  - Eric Peterson

== Production ==
The series was first announced in September 2019. Showrunner Megan Dong drew inspiration from her experiences joining choir in high school for the show's story as well as biology, which incentivized her to represent a large variety of animals as centaurs. The segments which take place in the show's titular location were primarily animated by Canadian studio Mercury Filmworks while segments in the human world were animated by Korean studio Red Dog Culture House.

== Episodes ==
=== Series overview ===
Season	Episodes	Originally released
1	10	July 30, 2021
2	8	December 7, 2021

=== Season 1 (2021) ===
No. overall	No. in season	Title	Directed by	Written by	Storyboard by	Original release date
1	1	"Hello Rainbow Road"	Megan Dong	Jen Bardekoff, Dong & Jessie Wong	David Au, Dominic Bisignano, Dong & Wong	July 30, 2021 (Note: This episode was released on the Netflix Futures YouTube channel on July 26, 2021 ahead of the debut of the first season.)
In a war-torn land, a warhorse named Horse and its rider find their village burned to ash after they return from a mission to find the key to victory, a mysterious object known as the Artifact. When the opposing army of invaders attacks them, Rider and Horse reach a cliff. Horse begins to fall off the edge, and Rider tries to pull her back up, but Horse is too heavy and falls with the Artifact. Horse lands in a colorful world filled with strange centaurs of all shapes and sizes who befriend her, and she suddenly has the power of speech. Horse desperately wants to reunite with Rider, but she finds that she cannot leave due to an invisible barrier enclosing Centaur Valley. Horse persuades the centaurs to leave the safety of the valley, by using their magic to breach the barrier, and help her search for Rider. Songs: "Rider's Lullaby", "Welcome to Centaurworld", "Spells For Days", and "Hello Rainbow Road"
2	2	"Fragile Things"	Jen Bennett	Minty Lewis	Maha Tabikh, David Woo & Louie Zong	July 30, 2021
After leaving Centaur Valley, Horse and Wammawink's herd follow the rainbow road in search of a shaman. While Wammawink tries to tell her herd to walk slowly so that they can remain safe, Horse charges ahead telling everyone that they need to have courage. Songs: "Fragile Things", "Taurnado", and "What If I Forget Your Face"
3	3	"The Key"	Jeremy Polgar	Jen Bardekoff	Madeleine Flores & Samantha Suyi Lee	July 30, 2021
Horse, while chasing after what appears to be Rider, bumps into Waterbaby, the shaman. She tells them that the Artifact is part of a larger key, used to open the rift between Horse and Rider's home world and Centaurworld. Songs: "Making Friendships–BOATS!", "Frustration Tears", and "The Key"
4	4	"What You Need"	Christina "Kiki" Manrique	Todd Casey	Alexandra Chiu & Chris Pianka	July 30, 2021
Horse and the rest of the herd continue down the rainbow road to the Lost Forest, where the Tree Shamans reside. Wammawink is shaken due to the forest being where her village once resided, leaving Horse to lead the group. Together, they must confront the difference between what they want and what they need in order to receive the next key piece. Songs: "What You Need", "He Never Says Anything Nice", "Rider's Lullaby (Reprise)", and "The Nowhere King"
5	5	"It's Hidin' Time"	Katie Shanahan	Ryan Harer	Charlie Bryant, Quinne Larsen & David Woo	July 30, 2021
A rainstorm forces the herd into a cave, where they become trapped inside by a beartaur. Horse is confident that they can manage while Wammawink sleeps, so the group tries to find a way out without waking her. Songs: "Where Does Food Come From", "It's Hidin' Time", and "My Collection"
6	6	"Holes: Part 2"	Jen Bennett	Amalia Levari & Minty Lewis	Maha Tabikh, David Woo & Louie Zong	July 30, 2021
The herd follows the rainbow road into a hole in the ground and must defend themselves in a trial against the next shaman, Judge Jacket, while Horse deals with her growing magical powers. Songs: "I Stealz So I Can Feelz", "Baby's First Spell", "The Underground", and "The Butt of The Joke"
7	7	"Johnny Teatime's Be Best Competition: A Quest for the Sash"	Jeremy Polgar	Jen Bardekoff	Madeleine Flores & Samantha Suyi Lee	July 30, 2021
Horse and the herd reach the location of the next shaman, Johnny Teatime, and Horse, with Zulius' help, tries to compete in a daily talent competition to win the next piece of the key. Songs: "Everyday", "And We Do This Everyday", "I Don't Know Him", "Who Is She?", and "The Nowhere King (Reprise)"
8	8	"Ride the Whaletaur Shaman!"	Christina "Kiki" Manrique	Todd Casey	Alexandra Chiu & Chris Pianka	July 30, 2021
The herd reaches the end of the rainbow road and the location of the last shaman. Horse feels lost because as her transformation has progressed, her memories of Rider have started to disappear. The rest of the group, worried about Horse, attempts to make her feel better. Songs: "It's Gonna Be A While", "Welcome To The Bay", "Who Is She? (Reprise)", and "Fragile Things (Reprise)"
9	9	"The Rift"	Katie Shanahan	Amalia Levari	Charlie Bryant & Quinne Larsen	July 30, 2021
10	10	"The Rift"	Jen Bennett	Aminder Dhaliwal	Christine Liu, Maha Tabikh, David Woo & Louie Zong	July 30, 2021
Part 1: As the herd reaches the doorway to the rift, Wammawink tries to spend as much time as she can with Horse before Waterbaby arrives to complete the key. Part 2: While Rider and Horse face the Nowhere King in the rift, Wammawink and her herd must escape the grasp of the Mysterious Woman. Songs: Part 1: "My Collection (Reprise)", "The Hero Of My Story (Comfortable Doug)", "Before You Go", "The Key (Reprise)", "I've Been Searching For You", and "The Nowhere King (Reprise 2)"; Part 2: "Nothing Good", "Nowhere King Battle", and "Separate Ways"

=== Season 2 (2021) ===
No. overall	No. in season	Title	Directed by	Written by	Storyboard by	Original release date
11	1	"Horsatia Wighair Beansz?"	Jeremy Polgar	Jen Bardekoff	Madeleine Flores, Samantha Suyi Lee & Christine Liu	December 7, 2021
Horse tries to recruit an army to defend Centaurworld, but no one wants to join. The herd visits the Horsetaurs' castle to see if they'll help. Songs: "Recruitment Song", "The Power of Privilege", "Durpleton's Lullaby"
12	2	"All Herd All the Terd"	Christina "Kiki" Manrique	Todd Casey	Alexandra Chiu, Christine Liu & Chris Pianka	December 7, 2021
Up in their cloud condo complex, the Birdtaurs have been obsessively watching the herd. Horse and friends are their favorite reality stars! Songs: "We've Been Watching You", "Crandy's Been Watching You (Reprise)", "Reenactment Chorus"
13	3	"My Tummy, Your Hurts"	Katie Shanahan	Amalia Levari	Charlie Bryant, Quinne Larsen & Christine Liu	December 7, 2021
Horse tries to enlist the fierce Coldtaurs in her battle --- but they capture Glendale! Back in the human world, Waterbaby sends a message to Rider. Songs: "So Cold", "Durple-Drop", "Breathe in a Bag" Note: This episode is dedicated to the memory of Maryam Chin Graul, who died on April 26, 2021, less than four months before the entire series was released.
14	4	"Holes: Part 3"	Jen Bennett	Aminder Dhaliwal	Christine Liu, Maha Tabikh & Louie Zong	December 7, 2021
On a trip the Underground Kingdom, Horse learns that Rider has a magnificent new horse named Becky Apples. Would Rider really replace her? Songs: "Becky Apples", "Holes Matter", "What Would You Say"
15	5	"Bunch O' Scrunch"	Jeremy Polgar	Jen Bardekoff	Madeleine Flores, Samantha Suyi Lee & Sopharra "Sophie" Kim	December 7, 2021
Horse discovers a powerful ability. She can jump into backstories! And seeing the tough times her herd friends faced helps her feel less alone. Songs: "Portal Tummy and Me", "My Very Favorite Time of Day", "The Best Dad"
16	6	"The Ballad of Becky Apples"	Christina "Kiki" Manrique	Todd Casey	Alexandra Chiu, Christine Liu & Chris Pianka	December 7, 2021
Rider defies the General's orders and goes to the Nowhere King's castle to get the artifact. But her new horse, Becky Apples, isn't exactly cooperative. Songs: None (This is the only episode in the series to not have any songs.)
17	7	"The Hootenanny"	Katie Shanahan	Amalia Levari	Charlie Bryant, Quinne Larsen, Christine Liu & Allen Zhang	December 7, 2021
All of Centaurworld's residents gather for the hootenanny. But can Horse turn this colorful collection of creatures into a fearless army? Songs: "What's a Hootenanny", "The Ballad of Guskin the Gophertaur", "Hootenanny Chorale"
18	8	"The Last Lullaby"	Jen Bennett, Christina "Kiki" Manrique & Jeremy Polgar	Jen Bardekoff, Todd Casey & Meghan McCarthy	Dominic Bisignano, Charlie Bryant, Alexandra Chiu, Megan Dong, Madeleine Flores, Quinne Larsen, Samantha Suyi Lee, Christine Liu, Chris Pianka, Maha Tabikh & Louie Zong	December 7, 2021
Horse leaps into the Nowhere King's mind and learns his haunting backstory. Meanwhile, Rider and the herd come up with a plan. Songs: "Who Was She", "Elk Tour Suite, Pt. 1 & 2", "Once Shattered, Now Whole", "Digging Friend-holes", "Elk Tour Suite, Pt. 3 & 4", "Elk Tour Suite Pt. 5", "Elk Tour Suite Pt. 6", "The Legend of Flat Dallas", "General's Battle Song", "Battle Round", "Last Lullaby, Pt. 1", "Last Lullaby, Pt. 2", "Start Over - Stabbleton Intervention", "The Next Thing"

== Music ==
=== Season 1 ===
Centaurworld: Music from the Netflix Original Series

Soundtrack album
- Released: July 30, 2021
- Recorded: 2020
- Genre: Soundtrack
- Label: Capitol Records

All music is composed by Toby Chu (orchestration and production; melody by the writers).

No.	Title	Writer(s)	Performer(s)	Length
1.	"Rider's Lullaby"	Megan Dong	Jessie Mueller	1:04
2.	"Centaurworld"	Dong	Parvesh Cheena, Chris Diamantopoulos, Dong, Kimiko Glenn, Megan Hilty, Josh Radnor & chorus	1:25
3.	"Spells For Days"	Dong	Cheena, Diamantopoulos, Dong, Hilty & Radnor	0:51
4.	"Hello Rainbow Road"	Dong	Glenn & chorus	2:27
5.	"Fragile Things"	Dong	Glenn & Hilty	2:29
6.	"Taurnado"	Dong	Dong, Glenn & chorus	2:43
7.	"What If I Forget Your Face"	Dong	Glenn	2:33
8.	"Making Friendships–BOATS!"	Dominic Bisignano	Cheena, Diamantopoulos, Dong & Radnor	0:46
9.	"Frustration Tears"	Dong	Glenn	1:40
10.	"The Key"	Dong	Glenn & Renée Elise Goldsberry with Toby Chu	2:07
11.	"What You Need"	Dong	First Aid Kit (episode); Dong (album)	1:18
12.	"He Never Says Anything Nice"	Bisignano	Radnor	0:41
13.	"Rider's Lullaby (Reprise)"	Dong	Glenn	0:47
14.	"The Nowhere King"	Dong	Randy Crenshaw, Allie Feder, Baraka May & Fletcher Sheridan	1:15
15.	"Where Does Food Come From"	Dong	Cheena, Dong, Diamantopoulos, Glenn & Radnor	1:10
16.	"It's Hidin' Time"	Dong	Crenshaw, Feder, May & Sheridan	0:46
17.	"My Collection"	Bisignano	Glenn & David Johansen	1:38
18.	"I Stealz So I Can Feelz"	Dong	Dong	0:44
19.	"Baby's First Spell"	Dong	Cheena, Diamantopoulos, Dong, Hilty & Radnor	1:13
20.	"The Underground"	Dong	Santigold; Backup: Dong, Glenn & Hilty	1:06
21.	"The Butt of the Joke"	Dong	Glenn & Paul F. Tompkins	1:57
22.	"And We Do This Everyday"	Bisignano	Fred Armisen, Diamantopoulos, Dong, Glenn, Hilty & chorus	1:35
23.	"I Don't Know Him"	Bisignano	Armisen, Cheena, Dong & Hilty	1:18
24.	"Who Is She?"	Dong	Dong, Glenn & Hilty	2:14
25.	"The Nowhere King (Reprise 2)"	Dong	Chu, Crenshaw, Feder, May & Sheridan	0:47
26.	"It's Gonna Be a While"	Bisignano	Jamie Cullum (episode); Bisignano (album), Carl Faruolo & Glenn	2:10
27.	"Welcome to the Bay"	Dong	Rosalie Craig	1:50
28.	"Who Is She? (Reprise)"	Dong	Glenn	2:09
29.	"Fragile Things (Reprise)"	Dong	Hilty & Craig	1:20
30.	"My Collection (Reprise)"	Dong	Dong	0:29
31.	"The Hero of My Story (Comfortable Doug)"	Bisignano	Flula Borg & chorus	2:50
32.	"Before You Go"	Dong	Diamantopoulos, Glenn & Hilty	1:49
33.	"The Key (Reprise)"	Dong	Goldsberry	0:54
34.	"I've Been Searching For You"	Dong	Glenn & Mueller	2:50
35.	"Nothing Good"	Dong	Lea Salonga & Hilty	1:40
36.	"Nowhere King Battle"	Bisignano	Goldsberry, Hilty, Brian Stokes Mitchell & chorus	2:07
37.	"Separate Ways"	Dong	Glenn & Mueller	2:08
Total length:				59:06

Note: The song "Everyday", from the episode "Johnny Teatime's Be Best Competition: A Quest for the Sash", does not appear on the album.

=== Season 2 ===
Centaurworld: S2 (Soundtrack from the Netflix Series)

Soundtrack album
- Released: December 7, 2021
- Recorded: 2020
- Genre: Soundtrack
- Label: Capitol Records

All music is composed by Toby Chu (orchestration and production; melody by the writers).

No.	Title	Writer(s)	Performer(s)	Length
1.	"Recruitment Song"	Dominic Bisignano	Kimiko Glenn, Fred Armisen, Santigold, Chris Diamantopoulos, Megan Hilty, Megan Dong, Parvesh Cheena, Josh Radnor, Carl Faruolo	2:41
2.	"The Power of Privilege"	Bisignano	Maria Bamford, Diamantopoulos, & Glenn	1:22
3.	"Durpleton's Lullaby"	Bisignano	Radnor	1:42
4.	"We've Been Watching You"	Dong	Scott Hoying, Grey Griffin, Glenn, & chorus	2:30
5.	"Crandy's Been Watching You (reprise)"	Dong	Colleen Ballinger	0:27
6.	"Reenactment Chorus"	Bisignano	Cheena, Hoying, Dong, Glenn, Radnor, Hilty, and Toby Chu	3:58
7.	"So Cold"	Bisignano	Dee Bradley Baker, Jessie Mueller, Glenn, Hilty, & Diamantopoulos	1:17
8.	"Durple-Drop"	Bisignano	Radnor & chorus	0:30
9.	"Breathe in a Bag"	Dong	Dong, Baker, Mueller, Diamantopoulos, & Hilty	1:52
10.	"Becky Apples"	Dong	Glenn & Hilty	2:19
11.	"Holes Matter"	Bisignano	Santigold, Donna Lynn Champlin, Fred Tatasciore, Dong, & chorus	2:14
12.	"What Would You Say"	Bisignano	Radnor & Baker	1:50
13.	"Portal Tummy and Me"	Dong	Isabella Russo	0:49
14.	"My Very Favorite Time of Day"	Bisignano	Roman Engel & Glenn	1:21
15.	"The Best Dad"	Dong	Andy Walken, Tony Hale, Wendie Malick, & Glenn	2:15
16.	"What's a Hootenanny"	Dong	The Centaurworld Cast	3:32
17.	"The Ballad of Guskin the Gophertaur"	Bisignano	The Centaurworld Cast	3:06
18.	"Hootenanny Chorale"	Dong	Glenn & The Centaurworld Cast	1:39
19.	"Who Was She"	Dong	Glenn	2:02
20.	"Elk Tour Suite, Pt. 1 & 2"	Bisignano	Brian Stokes Mitchell & Lea Salonga	1:39
21.	"Once Shattered, Now Whole"	Dong	Brian d'Arcy James, Mitchell, Salonga & choir	1:47
22.	"Digging Friend-holes"	Dong	Flula Borg, Mueller, Radnor & chorus	0:46
23.	"Elk Tour Suite, Pt. 3 & 4"	Bisignano	Mitchell and Diamantopoulos, with Armisen & Ballinger	3:07
24.	"Elk Tour Suite Pt. 5"	Bisignano	Mitchell	1:13
25.	"Elk Tour Suite Pt. 6"	Bisignano	Mitchell & Diamantopoulos	2:16
26.	"The Legend of Flat Dallas"	Dong	Borg & chorus	1:43
27.	"General's Battle Song"	Dong	James, Mueller, Baker, & Hilty	1:33
28.	"Battle Round"	Bisignano	Glenn, Hilty, Dong, Radnor, Cheena, & Diamantopoulos	2:19
29.	"Last Lullaby, Pt. 1"	Dong	Salonga, James, & Mitchell	1:33
30.	"Last Lullaby, Pt. 2"	Dong	Glenn & Mueller	1:49
31.	"Start Over - Stabbleton Intervention"	Dong	Hilty, Renée Elise Goldsberry, Glenn, Radnor, Baker, & chorus	1:14
32.	"The Next Thing"	Dong	Glenn, Mueller, Hilty, Goldsberry, Radnor, Baker, Borg, Faruolo, Ballinger, Hoying, Cheena, & Diamantopoulos	3:14
Total length:				61:42

== Release ==
Centaurworld was released on Netflix on July 30, 2021. A trailer debuted at the virtual Annecy International Animation Film Festival event in June 2021. A trailer and release date for the second season was posted on November 9, 2021.

== Reception ==
The first season of Centaurworld holds a 100% approval rating on Rotten Tomatoes based on 8 reviews, with an average rating of 9/10.

Amanda Dyer of Common Sense Media gave the show four stars out of five, describing it as a "musical cartoon has magic, farts, and war-hardened horse." She also noted that the character designs are "ultra-quirky and silly magic," in the depth of the series' setting. Petrana Radulovic of Polygon reviewed the show in the first season say it was "feels off-balance, too light-hearted in the beginning and middle to be taken seriously in the end. But with interesting characters, deliberate and interesting uses of animation style, and engaging music, it's intriguing enough to leave audiences hoping for more."

=== Awards and nominations ===
Year	Award	Category	Nominee	Result	Ref.
2021	Ursa Major Awards	Best Dramatic Series	Centaurworld	Nominated	
2022	Children's and Family Emmys	Outstanding Casting for an Animated Program	Linda Lamontagne	Nominated	
2022	Children's and Family Emmys	Outstanding Voice Directing for an Animated Series	Kristi Reed	Won	
2022	Children's and Family Emmys	Outstanding Younger Voice Performer in an Animated or Preschool Animated Program	Andy Walken for playing Young Durpleton ("Bunch O' Scrunch")	Won	
