= Vanessa Branch =

American actress

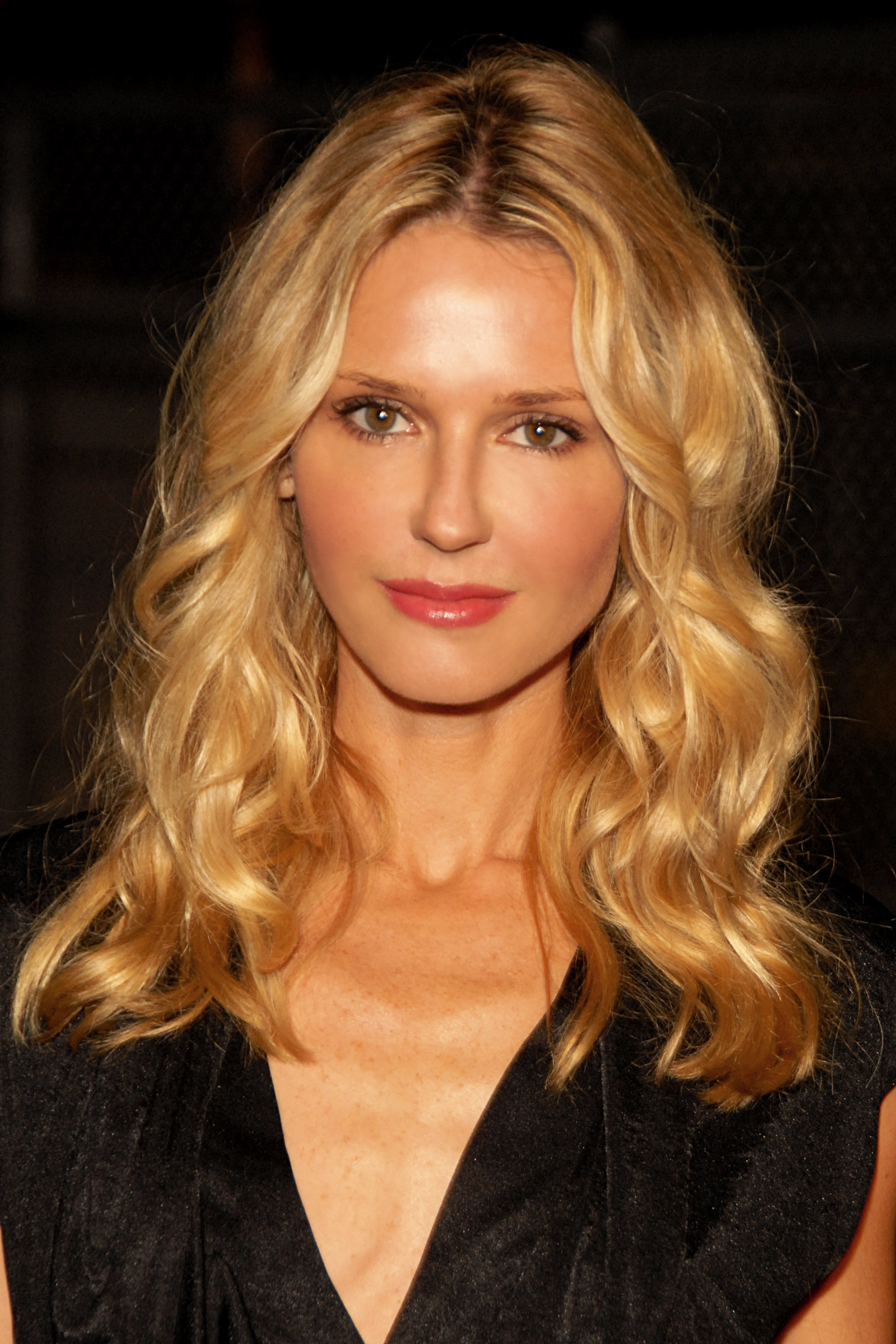
- Branch at Maxim's 10th Annual Hot 100 Celebration in 2009
- Education: Middlebury College
- Occupations: Actress; model
- Years active: 1999–present
- Known for: Miss Vermont 1994; Orbit Gum commercials; Giselle in Pirates of the Caribbean

Vanessa Branch is an American actress and model. She is best known in the United States as the Orbit Gum girl for its 2002 to 2010 television marketing campaign, as well as Giselle in the Pirates of the Caribbean series, specifically Gore Verbinski's trilogy and James Ward Byrkit's short film Tales of the Code: Wedlocked.

== Early life ==
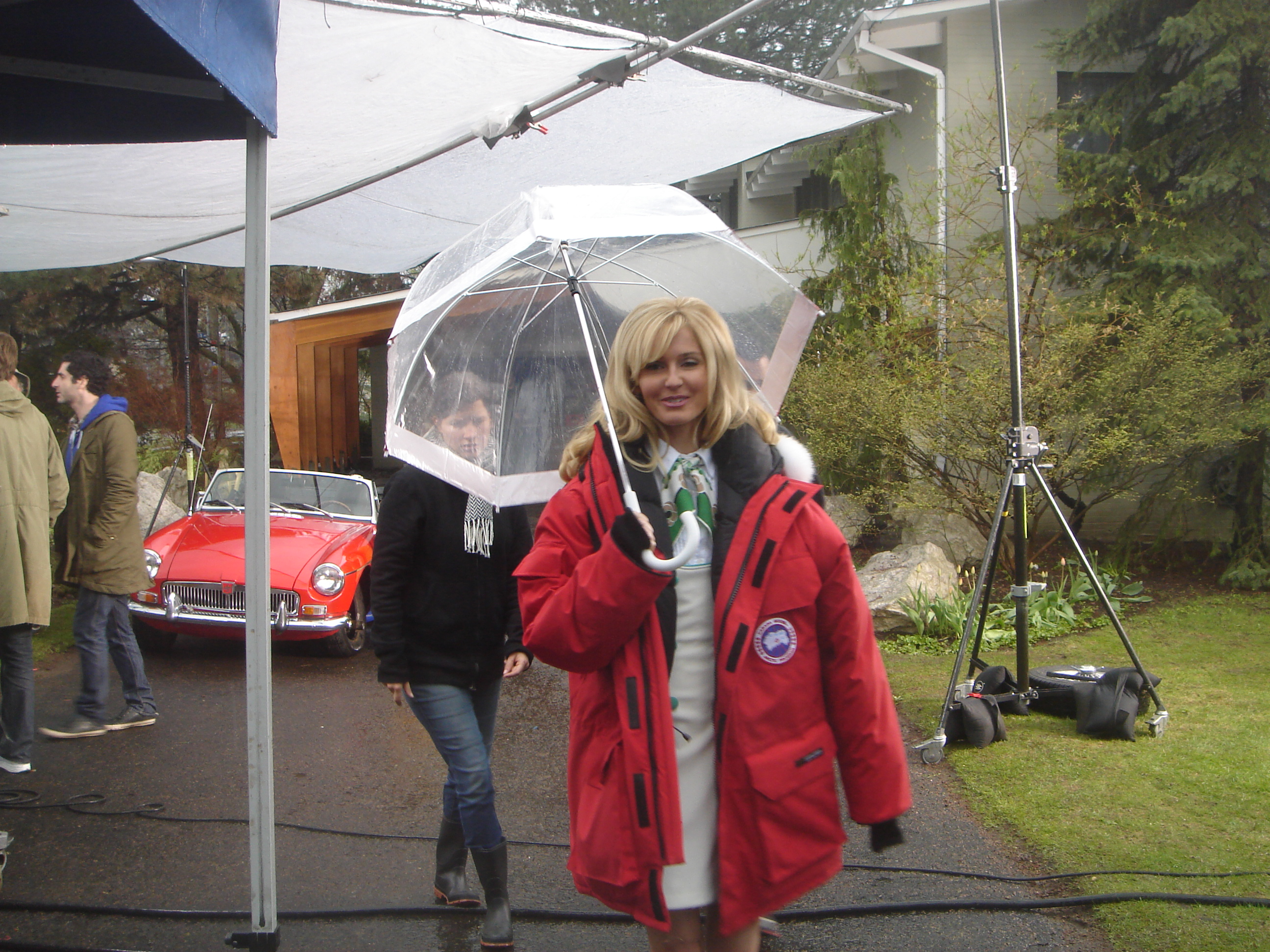
Branch filming a television commercial for Orbit Gum in Toronto, Canada in 2007

Branch speaks French and Mandarin Chinese.

After graduating from Mercersburg Academy, a boarding school located in Mercersburg, Pennsylvania, she earned a degree from Middlebury College in 1994, completing a double major in French and theatre. That same year, she was crowned Miss Vermont 1994 and went on to compete in Miss America 1995. Following her graduation, Branch pursued an international modeling career, appearing in publications such as Elle and Harper's Bazaar. She later relocated to Los Angeles to pursue acting. In 2002, she began appearing in the long-running Orbit chewing gum advertising campaign, portraying its distinctive British spokesperson for eight years and featuring in 45 commercials. Branch also gained recognition for her role as Giselle in the first three installments of the Pirates of the Caribbean series. In addition, she has starred in leading roles in several Chinese-language films performed in Mandarin.

== Filmography ==
Film
Year	Title	Role	Notes
2000	The Cell	Stargher's Victim	
2001	Ticker	Redhead	
2001	Good Advice	TV Newswoman	
2002	John Q.	Registered Nurse	
2003	Pirates of the Caribbean: The Curse of the Black Pearl	Giselle	
2004	In Enemy Hands	Admiral Kentz's Secretary	
2004	Almost	Rachel / Samantha	Also producer
2005	Dreaming Reality	Doctor	Short film
2006	Pirates of the Caribbean: Dead Man's Chest	Giselle	
2007	Asylum	Sophie Miller	
2007	Suburban Girl	Faye Faulkner	
2007	Pirates of the Caribbean: At World's End	Giselle	
2007	Milk and Fashion	Anna	
2008	Cold Play	Indigo Thorpe	
2008	All Roads Lead Home	Lillian	
2008	Wild Child	Rosemary	Uncredited
2009	Post Grad	Receptionist	
2009	Feed the Fish	Lorraine	
2009	Love in Translation	Sophie	
2010	Dante's Inferno: An Animated Epic	Beatrice	
2011	51	Claire Felon	
2011	Pirates of the Caribbean: Tales of the Code: Wedlocked	Giselle	Short film
2011	6 Month Rule	Wendy	
2012	Kung Fu Man	Susan	
2014	Cat Run 2	Wollcroft	
2014	500 Miles North	Claire	
2015	Road Hard	Nancy	
2016	Love is Color Blind	Ana	Short film
2017	American Satan	Leo's Mom	Uncredited
2017	Silent Kingdom		Short film

Television
Year	Title	Role	Notes
1999	Encore! Encore!	Danielle Bertrand	Episode: "To Soeur with Love"
2001	Star Trek: Voyager	Adult Naomi Wildman	Episode: "Shattered"
2001	The Invisible Man	Amanda / Mandy	Episode: "Going Postal"
2001	The Mind of the Married Man	N/A	Episode: "When We Were Nice"
2002	Port Charles	Paige Barrington Smith	Episode: "Episode #1.1182"
2002	Livin' Large	Segment Host	Episode: "2002 Tattoo Convention Coverage"
2004	She Spies	Kendall Swann	Episode: "Wedding of the Century"
2005	Entourage	Chinese Interpreter	Episode: "Chinatown"
2005	Eve	Imogene	2 episodes
2006	Lost	Karen	Episode: "Fire + Water"
2006	Gilmore Girls	Bobbi	2 episodes
2007	Monk	Mrs. Murphy	Episode: "Mr. Monk Is at Your Service"
2007	Andy Barker, P.I.	Nadia	Episode: "Pilot"
2008	CSI: Miami	Lisa Radley	Episode: "Cheating Death"
2011	Turbo Dates	Barbara	Episode: "Chemistry"
2011	The Protector	Mrs. Lennox	Episode: "Ghosts"
2012	Criminal Minds	Teri Banks	Episode: "Snake Eyes"
2012	Bones	Claire Lazebnik	Episode: "The Prisoner in the Pipe"
2012	Perception	Michelle Akers	Episode: "Lovesick"
2013	Model Employee	Judge	9 episodes
2014	Days of Our Lives	Giselle Van Hopper	2 episodes
2014	Satisfaction	Denise	Episode: "...Through Admission"

Video games
Year	Title	Role	Notes
2008	Command & Conquer: Red Alert 3	Commander Zhana Agonskaya	
2010	Dante's Inferno	Beatrice	

Awards and achievements
Preceded by Jacqueline Quirk	Miss Vermont; 1994	Succeeded by Jennifer Faucette
