= Sawyer Barth =

American actor (born 2001)

Sawyer Wade Barth
- Born: November 7, 2001 (age 24); Red Bank, New Jersey, U.S.
- Occupation: Actor
- Years active: 2012–present

Sawyer Wade Barth (born November 7, 2001) is an American actor, known for their role as Flake in And Then I Go and as Frank Cleary in the ABC sitcom The Kids Are Alright.

== Biography and career ==
A native of West Long Branch, New Jersey, Barth began receiving acting lessons at Actors Playground School of Theatre in Freehold, NJ at the age of 10 and since then has been actively involved in the entertainment industry, starring in plays, movies and TV, including anti-gun violence plays Bang Bang You're Dead and Lost Angels with the Playground Theatre Project based at Actors Playground. Barth was also active in competitive soccer throughout high school.

In And Then I Go, Barth played the disturbed loner Flake. Barth had originally auditioned for the main role of Edwin, and was instead called back to be cast as his troublesome best friend. A critic commented, "Darbo [playing the main character] and Barth both prove exceptionally receptive to the filmmakers' sometimes surprising guidance by exhibiting contrasting responses. Barth excels at concentrating the frustration that an uncaring family and educational system foist upon Flake into sudden bursts of uncontained rage." With regard to the on-screen violence in the film, Barth stated in an interview: "They yelled 'Cut,' and then I walked out of the gym just to take a breather. I handed over my gun—which wasn't a prop gun, it was a real gun it just wasn't loaded—to the ammunition handlers, and I just walked outside for a second. It was way more intense, that felt way more real than I expected. Pointing that thing at an actual human and pretending to shoot them… it's something that shouldn't physically be done."

In 2018, Barth was cast as Frank Cleary in the ABC show The Kids Are Alright. In 2019, they were a guest star in CBS's God Friended Me as Jacob Abbott. Barth's directorial debut was in 2023 with a theatrical production of Art, also co-producing and co-starring. In 2024, Barth and actor-producer Dylan Pitanza officially launched their nonprofit theatre organization, Utopia for Losers, featuring play stagings at Actors Playground and in off-off-Broadway New York venues. Barth is making their Broadway debut understudying the role of Tony in The Hills of California as of September 2024, in a production directed by Sam Mendes.

== Filmography ==
=== Film ===
| Year | Title | Role | Notes |
|---|---|---|---|
| 2014 | The Walk | Young Danny Greenstein | |
| 2015 | Bridge of Spies | Bellamy | |
| 2015 | The Bar Mitzvah Club | Arty | |
| 2017 | And Then I Go | Roddy (Flake) | |
| 2017 | Super Dark Times | Charlie Barth | Supporting role |
| 2017 | The Real Stephen Blatt | Drew Cassidy | 1 episode; "The Consultant" |
| 2018 | Irreplaceable You | Teen Sam | |
| 2018 | Defender | Lawrence | |
| 2020 | Goodbye Grandma | Sawyer | Short |
| 2021 | Country Starts At Home | McCann, Tyler | Short |

=== Television ===
| Year | Title | Role | Notes |
|---|---|---|---|
| 2014 | The Following | Chris | 1 episode; "Sacrifice" |
| 2014 | Black Box | Young Joshua Black | 3 episodes; "Kiss the Sky", "Sweet Little Lies", "Forget Me" |
| 2014 | The Knick | The Whispering Kid | 1 episode; "Get the Rope" |
| 2015 | Public Morals | Michael Muldoon | 7 episodes; "A Fine Line", "Family is Family", "Ladies Night", "A Good Shooting", "Collection Day", "No Crazies on the Street", "A Thought and a Soul" |
| 2016 | Amy's Brother | Zach | Pilot |
| 2016 | Home | Nate Bell | Pilot |
| 2018–19 | The Kids Are Alright | Frank Cleary | Series Regular |
| 2019 | God Friended Me | Jacob Abbott | 1 episode; "The Lady" |
| 2022 | East New York | Darren | 1 episode; "The Small Things" |
