= Jiang Mengjie =

Chinese actress

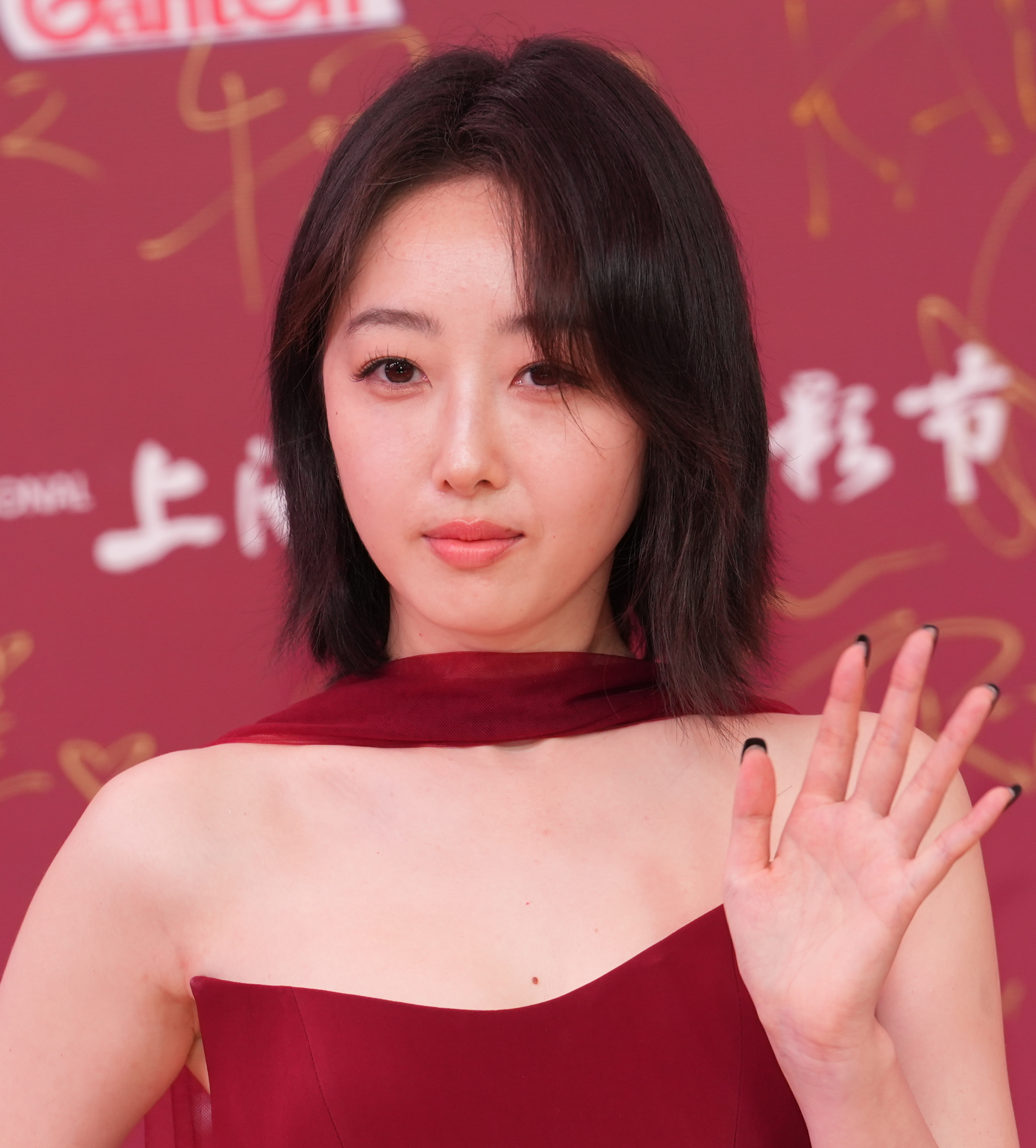
- Jiang at 2026 Shanghai International Film Festival
- Born: December 7, 1989 (age 36); Wuhu, Anhui, China
- Occupation: Actress
- Years active: 2010–present
- Agent: FWS

Chinese name
- Traditional Chinese: 蔣夢婕
- Simplified Chinese: 蒋梦婕
Transcriptions
Standard Mandarin
- Hanyu Pinyin: Jiǎng Mèngjié

Jiang Mengjie (Chinese: 蒋梦婕, born 7 December 1989) is a Chinese actress. She is best known for her role as Lin Daiyu in 2010 television series The Dream of Red Mansions.

== Early life and education ==
Jiang was born on 7 December 1989 in Wuhu, Anhui. At the age of 11, she was admitted to the secondary school attached to the Beijing Dance Academy, where she studied ballet for seven years.

== Acting career ==
=== 2008–2012: The Dream of Red Mansions and early roles ===
While she was a student at the Beijing Dance Academy, Jiang was cast as Lin Daiyu in the director Li Shaohong's television adaptation of the novel Dream of the Red Chamber. She was announced in the role at a press conference in Beijing on 17 July 2008, replacing earlier candidates including Yao Di, who had been named as the adult Daiyu but was moved to the role of Wang Xifeng. According to China News Service, Li and her husband Zeng Nianping considered that Jiang had a distinctive temperament. The series, The Dream of Red Mansions, premiered on local television stations on 26 June 2010, with Jiang playing the older Daiyu and Lin Miaoke playing the character as a child. Her portrayal was among the most criticised in the series, with online viewers objecting to her appearance and expressions. The role won her the best newcomer award at the 2010 China TV Drama Awards.

Jiang's first film was To My Wife (2011), about the revolutionary Lin Juemin and his wife, Chen Yiying, which was released for the centenary of the 1911 Revolution. For her role in the film, she shared the Excellent Actress award at the 12th Lily Awards of CCTV-6, the China Central Television film channel, in 2012. In 2012, she played the younger sister in the film Joyful Reunion.

=== 2013–2016: Kung Fu Man, contract dispute and Sword Master ===
In 2013, Jiang appeared as Liu Jie, an English teacher from Beijing, in Kung Fu Man, which was directed by Ning Ying and Yuan Xiangren, with Keanu Reeves as an executive producer. The critic Derek Elley wrote that she had "little to do" beyond translating for a young boy. On 27 April 2015, Jiang announced on social media that she had ended her contract with her agency, Rongxinda, after about seven years with the company. She had filed for arbitration with the Beijing Arbitration Commission on 31 March, asking it to confirm that the contract had been dissolved. Jiang said that she had not seen her employment agreement until she left, that she was often given work at short notice, and that the company had failed to respond to long-running online rumours about her. Her lawyer, Wang Jun, said that her 15-year contract was identical to that of Yang Yang, who had played Jia Baoyu in The Dream of Red Mansions and had left the agency a few months earlier.

In January 2016, Jiang appeared as Mia Ren, a television reporter covering the maiden flight of a super-plane, in Lost in the Pacific, alongside Brandon Routh and Zhang Yuqi. A review on Sino-Cinema found that she handled her English dialogue better than most of the cast but described the role as "ridiculous". She also starred in the web series Suddenly Seventeen (2016). In December 2016, she played Wawa, a courtesan, in Derek Yee's Sword Master, alongside Lin Gengxin and Peter Ho. The Sino-Cinema review described her and Ho as giving "playful performances".

=== 2017–present ===
In 2017, Jiang played Flora, a visitor from Toronto who stays with the main couple, in Pang Ho-cheung's Love Off the Cuff, which was released in April. The Sino-Cinema review noted that she and Wang Xiaochen, as Mandarin speakers, played outsiders in a film centred on Hong Kong. In June 2024, she made a guest appearance in the live-action series Link Click, which premiered on Bilibili on 19 June. She had a special appearance in the film High Forces, directed by Oxide Pang and starring Andy Lau, which was released in China on 30 September 2024. In March 2025, she was one of the 30 contestants in the Mango TV variety show Ride the Wind 2025.

In June 2026, the aerospace drama Xing Yue Zheng Tu (lit. 'Star and Moon Expedition'), inspired by the Chinese Lunar Exploration Program, premiered on China Central Television, with Jiang playing Chu Jiajia, a member of a flight control team, opposite Qu Chuxiao. On 23 October 2026, the magical realist crime film Fennu de Laohu (lit. 'Angry Tiger'), written and directed by Li Rui, was released nationwide, with Jiang and Zhu Zhengting in the leading roles. She played Zhang Jiaying, an independent woman who resists after her life is thrown into crisis.

== Personal life ==
On 19 April 2023, Jiang said on social media that a video secretly filmed up her skirt in a busy area many years earlier had been circulated online and used to blackmail her. She said that the blackmailer had sent emails containing screenshots of the video to her agent, business partners and film companies, and had threatened to sell it. She reported the case to the police, who accepted it on 2 April, and the suspect was detained. She said that the video had been viewed more than a million times, and her decision to speak out drew wide support online.

== Filmography ==
=== Film ===
Year	Chinese title	English title	Role	Notes
2011	百年情书	To My Wife	Chen Yiying	Baihe Awards Ceremony for Movies - Best Actress
2012	饮食男女：好远又好近	Eat Drink Man Woman 2	Tang Xiaolan	
2013	功夫侠	Kung Fu Man	Liu Jie	
2013	来历不明	Unidentified	Shu Yinan	
2013	一路顺疯	Bump in the Road	Xiaolan	
2014	完美假妻168	Lock Me Up, Tie Him Down	Wen Li	
2014	小河亲过我的脸	The Sweet River	Cai Feng	
2015	我是路人甲	I Am Somebody	Ren Xing	
2016	蒸发太平洋	Lost in the Pacific	Mia	
2016	三少爺的劍	Sword Master	"Princess" Hsiao Li / Sweetie	
2017	春嬌救志明	Love Off the Cuff	Flora	
2017	巨额来电	The Big Call	Xu Xiaotu	

=== Television series ===
Year	Chinese title	English title	Role	Notes
2010	新红楼梦	The Dream of Red Mansions	Lin Daiyu	China TV Drama Awards - Best New Actress
2011	青春旋律	Melody of Youth	Pu Xiaotang	
2011	被遗弃的秘密	Abandoned Secret	Liu Liu	
2012	刺青海娘	Sea Mother	Chen Xiang	
2013	王者清风	The Empire Warrior	Song Tiantian	
2013	生死相依	Death Do Us Part	Liang Susu	
2013	一克拉梦想	The Diamond's Dream	Liu Meili	
2014	说好的幸福	Said Happiness	Yang Xinran	
2015	聊斋4	Strange Stories from a Chinese Studio	Xiao Man	
2015	绝命追踪		Yu Zi	
2015	翻身姐妹	Miss Badass	Qian Miaomiao	Season 1-2
2015	婚姻攻防战之爱要付出	Love is Giving	Ke Yimiao	
2016	28岁未成年	Suddenly Seventeen	Liang Xia	
2017	云巅之上	Above the Clouds	Ji Qing	
2017	风光大嫁	The Perfect Wedding	Ning Xia	
2020	我在北京等你	Wait in Beijing	Yan Po	
2020	你成功引起我注意了	My Dear Lady	Ling Xunxun	
2020	欢喜猎人	Happy Hunter	Teacher Zhou	
2021	大唐女儿行	Ode to Daughter of Great Tang	Crown Princess Su	
2021	理想照耀中国	Faith Makes Great	Li Zhiqiang	
2021	功勋	Medal of the Republic	Tian Hehua	
2023	大泼猴	The Legends of Changing Destiny	Yang Lan	
2023	问苍茫		Song Meiling	
2024	时光代理人		Zhou Xiaobai	
2025	人生若如初见	A Love Never Lost	Xiao Fenglan	
TBA	哥不是传说	I Am Not a Legend	Yao'zi	
TBA	亲爱的孩子	Dear One	Cao Yufen	

=== Variety show ===
Year	English title	Chinese title	Role	Notes
2020	My Little One 2	我家那闺女2	Cast member	
