= Sword Master (film) =

2015 Chinese-Hong Kong film by Derek Yee

- Poster
- Directed by: Derek Yee
- Screenplay by: Tsui Hark; Derek Yee; Chun Tin-nam
- Based on: The Third Master's Sword 三少爷的剑 by Gu Long
- Produced by: Tsui Hark
- Starring: Kenny Lin; Peter Ho; Jiang Yiyan; Jiang Mengjie
- Cinematography: William Chan; Chan Chi-ying
- Edited by: Derek Hui; Li Ruiliang
- Music by: Peter Kam
- Production companies: Bona Film Group; Film Unlimited Production
- Distributed by: Zhejiang Bona Production; Xinjiang Bona Runze Media; Huaxia Film Distribution
- Release date: 2 December 2016 (China)
- Running time: 108 minutes
- Countries: China; Hong Kong
- Language: Mandarin
- Box office: US$14.7 million

Sword Master (Chinese: 三少爺的劍) is a 2016 3D martial arts film directed by Derek Yee. The film is a Chinese-Hong Kong co-production, was released on 2 December 2016. The film made its worldwide and domestic debut at the 11th Rome Film Festival and the 53rd Golden Horse Film Festival respectively. The film is a remake of the 1977 Shaw Brothers Studio Hong Kong film Death Duel, which starred Yee.

== Plot ==
Yen Shisan (Peter Ho), a tattooed swordsman and assassin, having lived his life as a master swordsman in the shadow of Third Master/Hsieh Shao-Feng, and having been asked to kill Shao-Feng by Mu-Yung Chiu-Ti (Jiang Yiyan), who claims to be Shao-Feng's jilted bride refuses contract, but still goes in search of the only opponent who might be able to defeat him, arriving at Supreme Sword Manor only to be told by Cult Leader Hsieh (Norman Chui), Shao-Feng's father, that Shao-Feng has died but 36 days earlier. Deprived of his rival, dying of an inevitable (but not debilitating) ailment, and possessed of a pill that can cure all wounds except his own sickness, Yen Shisan takes up the life of a gravedigger, trying to live a good life in the time he has left to him, while the evil kung fu group Divine Might decides to defeat the Supreme Sword Manor themselves and become the supreme force in the wulin (the world of Kung Fu), as, bereft of Shao-Feng, there is nobody there who can stand against them.

Meanwhile, a drunken lout (Lin Gengxin), arrives at a brothel, drinks until he is out of money, and is coerced into working as a servant for the brothel-keepers. Refusing to give a name, he is nicknamed Ah-Chi ("Useless Chi"). He intercedes when the lowest-status of the prostitutes, Hsiao Li (Jiang Mengjie), is being stiffed by her patrons and bonds with her, but leaves the brothel after he hears that the Big Boss wants to promote him to a bouncer, instead being taken in and working with poor, but happy, nightsoil collectors. Hsaio Li, meanwhile, runs away from the abuse in the brothel with her earnings, back to her home: the very villagers who have taken Ah-Chi in.

The Big Boss sends enforcers to retrieve Hsiao Li and Ah-Chi, but they are defeated by Yen Shisan (carrying around his gravestone) and run back to the Big Boss, one of them announcing that Yen Shisan is going to fight a duel with Shao-Feng. The villagers plead with Yen Shisan to train them in Kung Fu or help them against Big Boss, and eventually swayed, he kills Big Boss (who reveals he is the representative of Divine Might in the town and threatens consequences before being killed) and most of his men, and teaches Ah-Chi his "13 Strikes" unique kung fu technique.

Meanwhile, Chiu-Ti and her warriors find Ah-Chi in the village, unmask him as Shao-Feng, and coerce him into agreeing to marry her for the third time. He moves into a hut with her and reveals why he left her the previous two times — the first because, sickened by the senseless slaughter and death his family inflicted on anyone who might be considered a rival, he had resolved to leave the wulin himself and live a simple life; the second, after he rode off with her on the eve of a marriage with a man she did not love, after it became clear that she did not understand and would never be content with the simple life he so desired. This time, she promises that she will live the simple life with him he desires, but after he shows that this life involves stepping into dirt, she decides to take revenge instead, leaving her husband alone.

Yen Shisan, meanwhile, is told that Ah-Chi is, in fact, Shao-Feng, his rival, and resolves to take him on, even though, having taught Shao-Feng his techniques, he believes he cannot win.

Shao-Feng returns to the village to sleep, where Hsiao Li attempts to seduce him (not for the first time), but before the seduction can be completed, Chiu-Ti arrives and attacks. Yen Shisan spirits Shao-Feng away to save his life, but this proves disastrous for the village, which is burned to the ground and nearly all its inhabitants slaughtered by Chiu-Ti's warriors. Shao-Feng arrives with Yen Shisan at the burned-out village, and is able to save only one person — Hsiao Li, who is barely alive, but returned to health with Yen Shisan's magic pill.

Yen Shisan and Shao-Feng talk of the impending attack of Chiu-Ti's warriors and Divine Might on his home, and Shao-Feng's unwillingness to fight — and Yen Shisan convinces Shao-Feng that with his great skill and two kung fu techniques, he can defeat all the forces arrayed against Supreme Sword Manor without killing.

Supreme Sword Manor is attacked, and its forces slaughtered and driven back by the combined power of Chiu-Ti's warriors, now working with Divine Might's masked fighters, until Yen Shisan arrives just in time to prevent an honor-saving suicide, and Shao-Feng defeats the combined attackers easily, unmasking Divine Might's warriors as the branded rejects from Supreme Sword Manor, and in the ensuing conflict, Chiu-Ti accidentally stabs her chief servant (and rejected lover) fatally, and faced with one final rejection; he stabs her in the back, resulting in her dying in Shao-Feng's arms in one final marriage.

Shao-Feng, now dressed in the black and white robes of a wandering swordsman, fights his duel of destiny with his friend and rival Yen Shisan; both swordsmen fight their utmost, and Yen Shisan is finally disarmed and killed, dying, as he wished, with honor on a sword he respected. Shao-Feng swaps swords with the dead Yen Shisan at his gravesite, and in the penultimate scene, goes to his life as a wandering swordsman with his burn-scarred companion, Hsiao Li. "Where are we going," she asks. "We'll right wrongs and fight for justice," he answers. "Will you kill people?" she asks. "I will save them," he says, and the final scene consists of vines falling in a forest to reveal the face of Goddess Kuan Yin, the Bodhisattva of Compassion.

== Cast ==
- Lin Gengxin as Hsieh Shao-Feng / Ah Chi
  - Chen Moyan as Shao-Feng (teen)
  - Harashima Daichi as Shao-Feng (juvenile)
- Peter Ho as Yen Shisan the assassin
- Jiang Yiyan as Mu-Yung Chiu-Ti
  - Zhang Ziyu as Chiu-Ti (teen)
  - Song Yiren as Chiu-Ti (juvenile)
- Jiang Mengjie as "Princess" Hsiao Li / Sweetie
- Norman Chui as Cult (Hsieh Clan & Supreme Sword Manor) Leader Hsieh, Shao-Feng's father
- Nina Paw as Hsiao Li's mother
- Ma Jingjing as Miao Tzu, Hsiao Li's brother
- Lai Jiatong as Nameless
- Hong Mu as Madam Mu-yung

== Production ==
The film was produced at the Hengdian World Studios. Principal photography started from 13 April 2014, and wrapped up on 8 September 2014 after 122 days of filming.

== Reception ==
The film grossed US$14,714,624 at the worldwide box office, including CN¥100.7 million in China ($14,502,045) and US$75,526 in the United States.
