= Triple Threat (2019 film) =

2019 film by Jesse V. Johnson

- Theatrical release poster
- Directed by: Jesse V. Johnson
- Screenplay by: Dwayne Smith
- Story by: Joey O'Bryan; Paul Staheli
- Produced by: Mike Gabrawy; Gary Hamilton; Chen Sylen Hwa; Sheldon Pang; Mike Selby; He Shi; Elliott Tong; Ying Ye
- Starring: Tony Jaa; Iko Uwais; Tiger Chen; Scott Adkins; Michael Jai White; Michael Bisping; Celina Jade; Jeeja Yanin
- Cinematography: Jonathan Hall
- Edited by: Matthew Lorentz
- Music by: Joel J. Richard
- Production companies: Kungfuman Culture Media; Hamilton Entertainment; Arclight Films; FJ Media Group; Gamegoo Pictures; WWE Studios; TF1 Séries Films; Ingenious Media
- Distributed by: Aurora Alliance Films; Well Go USA Entertainment
- Release date: March 19, 2019
- Running time: 96 minutes
- Countries: Thailand; China; United States; France
- Languages: English; Thai; Indonesian; Mandarin
- Budget: $10 million
- Box office: $345,900

Triple Threat is a 2019 action thriller film directed by Jesse V. Johnson from a story and screenplay by Joey O'Bryan & Paul Staheli and Dwayne Smith. The film stars Tony Jaa, Iko Uwais and Tiger Chen, alongside Scott Adkins, Michael Jai White, Michael Bisping, Celina Jade and Yanin Vismitananda. The music was composed by Joel J. Richard, while cinematography and editing were handled by Jonathan Hall and Matthew Lorentz.

Triple Threat was released on 19 March 2019 to positive reviews from critics with praise for its cast performances, action choreography and direction.

== Plot ==
Deveraux enlists Payu, ex-Thai Special Forces and Long Fei, ex-Chinese Special Forces, on a humanitarian mission in Thailand to free prisoners. Unbeknownst to Payu and Long, Deveraux and his crew consisting of Mook, Joey, Steiner and Dom actually want to use this mission to free their leader Collins, a terrorist. Deveraux and his crew shoot up the village guarded by Indonesian soldiers, waking up Jaka and killing his wife. During the ensuing chaos, Payu and Jaka fight, but get interrupted when Mook shoots a grenade at Jaka, knocking him out.

Collins is later freed and Deveraux double-crosses Payu and Long to tie up loose ends, knocking them down into a cage. Collins sets a bomb to burn down the evidence. Payu and Long free the remaining prisoners and barely escape. Jaka wakes up and sees his village in shambles. After burying his wife and the villagers, Jaka swears vengeance against Payu and the people responsible for the destruction of his village. A few days later, Jaka learns that Payu and Long are participating in an illegal boxing ring in Maha Jaya. After Payu defeats a boxer, Jaka and Long face off and the latter wins, but Payu recognizes him as the villager he fought a few days ago. After healing Jaka and giving him food, Jaka gets them drunk and calls the cops on them. Payu and Long are arrested and sent to the police station.

Tian Xiao Xian, a philanthropist, arrives in Maha Jaya and plans to donate money to charity in order to purge the city's corruption. Su Feng, a corrupt businesswoman who detests Tian for being in the way of her illegal activities, orders Collins and his crew to kill her. As Madame Liang takes Tian to the Chinese Embassy, Collins and his crew arrive and attempt to kill her. In the process many local bodyguards are killed, Liang is injured but not before gunning down Dom and telling Tian that she must go to the police station as it is the only place that she will be safe. Tian arrives at the police station to get help, but the officers do not understand her due to language barrier. The officers brought Long to her as a translator, while interrogating Payu in another room.

Meanwhile, Collins and his crew arrive at the police station after a tip from Jaka. As Payu fights Steiner, Jaka shoots Steiner, allowing Payu to kill Steiner. Jaka reveals that he had Payu and Long arrested to draw Collins out. Long fights against Joey and beats him, escaping with Payu and Tian. Jaka kills Mook by blowing her up with a grenade launcher, then meets up with Collins and pretend to ally with him. Payu calls Collins and offers to trade Tian for $100,000 and his freedom, asking to meet at the old Polo House. Collins verbally agrees, but later tells his crew and Jaka to use all their remaining money to hire shooters to kill them. Payu goes to his old boss and convinces him to give them weapons.

Long and Tian meet up with Collins and his crew at the location, while Payu swiftly guns down all the shooters. In the ensuing chaos, Long knocks out Joey by smashing a brick on his head and helps Jaka kill Deveraux. After calling the Chinese ambassador to reveal Tian's location, Jaka tries to help Payu beat Collins, but the latter is too much for them. Jaka is kicked off the balcony by Collins, who finds Tian and tries to shoot her, but Long takes the bullet. Payu arrives and finally kills Collins. Joey wakes up and is about to shoot Payu when Tian kills him. The next day, Su Feng is arrested. Liang finds Tian and reveals that Jaka was the one who gave them their location. Liang takes Tian to the Chinese Embassy, while Payu and Long jokingly berate Jaka for nearly getting them all killed with his plan.

== Cast ==
- Tony Jaa as Payu
- Iko Uwais as Jaka
- Tiger Chen as Long Fei
- Scott Adkins as Collins
- Michael Jai White as Devereaux
- Michael Bisping as Joey
- Celina Jade as Tian Xiao Xian
- Jeeja Yanin as Mook
- Ron Smoorenburg as Steiner
- Dominique Vandenberg as Dom
- Sile Zhang as Jaka's Wife
- Michael Wong as Triad Leader
- Jennifer Qi Jun Yang as Madame Liang
- Monica Mok as Su Feng
- Selina Lo as News Reporter Fei Chen

== Release ==
The film premiered on February 28, 2019 in China. It had a limited release in theaters for a day only on March 19, 2019 in the United States. It has been released internationally on VOD and Netflix on March 22, 2019. It was released theatrically in the United Kingdom on March 29, 2019.

== Reception ==
On Rotten Tomatoes the film has an approval rating of 67% based on 33 reviews, with an average rating of 5.7/10. The website's consensus reads: "Triple Threat might have made better use of its attention-getting cast, but action fans should still find the end results entertaining enough to rate a rental." Rotten Tomatoes also ranked it at No. 4 on its list of "The Best Action Movies of 2019". On Metacritic the film has a weighted average score of 60 out of 100 based on 4 reviews, indicating "mixed or average reviews".

For Forbes, Scott Mendelson wrote: "That being said, this is still an action movie starring a host of action movie all-stars, and they all get a chance to shine both in terms of character work and butt-kicking." Fred Topel of We Live Entertainment wrote: "You've got Silat vs Kung Fu and Muay Thai. They each get plenty of chances to fight solo too, or to team up against a powerful foe. Triple Threat really explores all the possible combinations of martial arts talent at their disposal."

Amanda Sink of Hollywood Outsider wrote that Triple Threat is explosively fun, ″with some of the best martial arts fight scenes, basic story turned intriguing, and a pronounced cast." Eoin of Action Elite gave the film 4 out of 5 stars wrote: "Overall, Triple Threat is a near perfect blend of fistfights and firepower making it easily the best action movie of the year so far; it has plenty of breakneck action, a cast that is clearly having a ball and one of the highest body counts in years."

Cary Daring of Houston Chronicle wrote: "Triple Threat does not deliver on its kinetic casting promise." Dom Sinacola of Paste Magazine wrote: "Triple Threat fight scenes never as mercilessly satiating as they could get nor its plot as brisk and fatless as it should be. Instead, a muddled narrative about criss-crossing allegiances and noble billionaires and shadowy criminal enterprises."

Nick Harley of Den of Geek wrote: "You'll spend most of the film's running time hoping that this trio gets to work together again in a film worthy of their talents."
