= List of The Nanny episodes =

The Nanny is an American television sitcom that aired for six seasons on CBS from 1993 to 1999. Created and produced by Fran Drescher and Peter Marc Jacobson, the series starred Drescher as Fran Fine, a Queens native who is hired by widower Maxwell "Max" Sheffield (Charles Shaughnessy) to be the nanny of his three children Margaret (Nicholle Tom), Brighton (Benjamin Salisbury), and Grace (Madeline Zima). The series also starred Lauren Lane as C.C. Babcock, Max's business associate, and Daniel Davis as Niles, the family's butler.

== Series overview ==
Season	Episodes	Originally released		Rank	Rating (Note: Ratings figures for seasons 5 and 6 are in viewers (millions), not household figures.)
Season	Episodes	First released	Last released	Rank	Rating
1	22	November 3, 1993	May 16, 1994	65	9.5
2	26	September 12, 1994	May 22, 1995	25	12.5
3	27	September 11, 1995	May 20, 1996	16	12.5
4	26	September 18, 1996	May 21, 1997	46	9.1
5	23	October 1, 1997	May 13, 1998	50	11.5
6	22	September 30, 1998	June 23, 1999	84	9.3

== Episodes ==
=== Season 1 (1993–94) ===
No. overall	No. in season	Title	Directed by	Written by	Original release date	Prod. code	U.S. viewers (millions)
1	1	"The Nanny"	Lee Shallat	Story by : Peter Marc Jacobson & Fran Drescher; Teleplay by : Peter Marc Jacobson & Robert Sternin & Prudence Fraser	November 3, 1993	101	15.0
2	2	"Smoke Gets in Your Lies"	Lee Shallat	Michael Rowe	November 10, 1993	103	11.6
3	3	"My Fair Nanny"	Lee Shallat	Andy Goodman	November 17, 1993	108	12.7
4	4	"The Nuchslep"	Lee Shallat	Eve Ahlert & Dennis Drake	November 24, 1993	102	11.5
5	5	"Here Comes the Brood"	Lee Shallat	Diane Wilk	December 6, 1993	104	20.3
6	6	"The Butler, The Husband, The Wife, and Her Mother"	Lee Shallat	Howard Meyers	December 8, 1993	107	13.7
7	7	"Imaginary Friend"	Lee Shallat	Pamela Eells & Sally Lapiduss	December 15, 1993	106	11.9
8	8	"Christmas Episode"	Lee Shallat	Fran Drescher & Peter Marc Jacobson	December 22, 1993	109	14.6
9	9	"Personal Business"	Lee Shallat	Fran Drescher & Peter Marc Jacobson	December 29, 1993	105	14.8
10	10	"The Nanny-in-Law"	Paul Miller	Eve Ahlert & Dennis Drake	January 12, 1994	110	14.3
11	11	"A Plot for Nanny"	Paul Miller	Sandy Krinski & Lisa Garrett	January 19, 1994	111	16.5
12	12	"The Show Must Go On"	Will Mackenzie	Frank Lombardi & Dana Reston	January 26, 1994	112	11.2
13	13	"Maggie the Model"	Will Mackenzie	Diane Wilk	February 2, 1994	115	13.7
14	14	"The Family Plumbing"	Linda Day	Bill Lawrence	February 9, 1994	113	16.0
15	15	"Deep Throat"	Linda Day	Pamela Eells & Sally Lapiduss	March 2, 1994	114	11.5
16	16	"Schlepped Away"	Linda Day	Fran Drescher & Peter Marc Jacobson	March 9, 1994	116	12.7
17	17	"Stop the Wedding, I Want to Get Off"	Gail Mancuso	Diane Wilk	March 16, 1994	117	9.7
18	18	"Sunday in the Park with Fran"	Gail Mancuso	Howard Meyers	March 23, 1994	118	11.3
19	19	"Gym Teacher"	Gail Mancuso	Alan Eisenstock & Larry Mintz	April 6, 1994	119	12.5
20	20	"Ode to Barbra Joan"	Gail Mancuso	Story by : David M. Matthews; Teleplay by : Frank Lombardi & Dana Reston	April 13, 1994	120	9.9
21	21	"Frannie's Choice"	Paul Miller	Tracy Newman & Jonathan Stark	April 20, 1994	121	9.9
22	22	"I Don't Remember Mama"	Paul Miller	Howard Meyers & Diane Wilk	May 16, 1994	122	19.1

=== Season 2 (1994–95) ===
No. overall	No. in season	Title	Directed by	Written by	Original release date	Prod. code	U.S. viewers (millions)
23	1	"Fran-Lite"	Lee Shallat	Janis Hirsch	September 12, 1994	201	17.6
24	2	"The Playwright"	Gail Mancuso	Lisa Medway	September 19, 1994	123	17.4
25	3	"Everybody Needs a Bubby"	Lee Shallat	Diane Wilk	September 26, 1994	204	18.5
26	4	"Material Fran"	Lee Shallat	Eileen O'Hare	October 3, 1994	203	18.3
27	5	"Curse of the Grandmas"	Lee Shallat	Eric Cohen	October 10, 1994	202	18.7
28	6	"The Nanny Napper"	Lee Shallat	Jayne Hamil & Rick Shaw	October 17, 1994	205	18.2
29	7	"A Star Is Unborn"	Gail Mancuso	Pamela Eells & Sally Lapiduss	October 24, 1994	124	18.6
30	8	"Pishke Business"	Lee Shallat	Alan R. Cohen & Alan Freedland	October 31, 1994	206	17.6
31	9	"Stock Tip"	Lee Shallat	Story by : Rob Schwartz & Bill Lawrence; Teleplay by : David M. Matthews	November 7, 1994	208	20.5
32	10	"The Whine Cellar"	Lee Shallat	Eileen O'Hare	November 14, 1994	210	19.8
33	11	"When You Pish Upon a Star"	Lee Shallat	Diane Wilk	November 21, 1994	209	19.5
34	12	"Take Back Your Mink"	Lee Shallat	Fran Drescher & Peter Marc Jacobson	November 21, 1994	207	20.3
35	13	"The Strike"	Lee Shallat	Janis Hirsch	November 28, 1994	211	19.4
36	14	"I've Got a Secret"	Lee Shallat	Eric Cohen	December 12, 1994	213	17.5
37	15	"Kindervelt Days"	Lee Shallat	Frank Lombardi & Dana Reston	January 2, 1995	212	23.1
38	16	"Canasta Masta"	Lee Shallat	Dana Reston & Frank Lombardi	January 9, 1995	214	19.5
39	17	"The Will"	Randy Bennett	Story by : Robbie Schwartz; Teleplay by : Fran Drescher & Peter Marc Jacobson	January 16, 1995	215	18.5
40	18	"The Nanny Behind the Man"	Lee Shallat	Story by : Rob Lotterstein & Ellen Idelson; Teleplay by : Jerry Perzigian	January 23, 1995	216	18.4
41	19	"A Fine Friendship"	Lee Shallat	Story by : Kirsten Vensel & Bill Marich & Rich Ross; Teleplay by : Eileen O'Hare	February 6, 1995	217	19.1
42	20	"Lamb Chop's On the Menu"	Lee Shallat	Frank Lombardi & Dana Reston	February 13, 1995	218	19.0
43	21	"Close Shave"	Dorothy Lyman	Elliot Stern	February 20, 1995	219	19.0
44	22	"What the Butler Sang"	Lee Shallat	Diane Wilk	February 27, 1995	220	19.3
45	23	"A Kiss Is Just a Kiss"	Dorothy Lyman	Eileen O'Hare	May 3, 1995	223	11.4
46	24	"Strange Bedfellows"	Dorothy Lyman	Frank Lombardi & Dana Reston	May 8, 1995	224	14.0
47	25	"The Chatterbox"	Lee Shallat	Story by : Fran Drescher & Peter Marc Jacobson; Teleplay by : Robert Sternin & Prudence Fraser	May 15, 1995	221	13.2
48	26	"Fran Gets Mugged"	Lee Shallat	Jayne Hamil & Rick Shaw	May 22, 1995	222	14.2

=== Season 3 (1995–96) ===
No. overall	No. in season	Title	Directed by	Written by	Original release date	Prod. code	U.S. viewers (millions)
49	1	"Pen Pal"	Dorothy Lyman	Jayne Hamil & Rick Shaw	September 11, 1995	303	17.6
50	2	"Franny and the Professor"	Dorothy Lyman	Janis Hirsch	September 18, 1995	302	19.3
51	3	"Dope Diamond"	Dorothy Lyman	Diane Wilk	September 25, 1995	304	18.0
52	4	"A Fine Family Feud"	Dorothy Lyman	Frank Lombardi	October 2, 1995	301	17.6
53	5	"Val's Apartment"	Dorothy Lyman	Pamela Eells & Sally Lapiduss	October 9, 1995	305	17.3
54	6	"Shopaholic"	Dorothy Lyman	Eric Cohen	October 16, 1995	307	19.8
55	7	"Oy Vey, You're Gay"	Dorothy Lyman	Eileen O'Hare	October 23, 1995	306	18.8
56	8	"The Party's Over"	Dorothy Lyman	Caryn Lucas	November 6, 1995	308	19.6
57	9	"The Two Mrs. Sheffields"	Dorothy Lyman	Diane Wilk	November 13, 1995	309	20.9
58	10	"Having His Baby"	Dorothy Lyman	Erik Mintz	November 20, 1995	310	17.7
59	11	"The Unkindest Cut"	Dorothy Lyman	Frank Lombardi	November 27, 1995	311	16.0
60	12	"The Kibbutz"	Dorothy Lyman	Frank Lombardi	December 4, 1995	312	18.3
61	13	"An Offer She Can't Refuse"	Dorothy Lyman	Jayne Hamil & Rick Shaw	December 11, 1995	313	18.9
62	14	"Oy to the World"	Lauren MacMullan	Fran Drescher & Peter Marc Jacobson	December 18, 1995	327	11.5
63	15	"Fashion Show"	Dorothy Lyman	Story by : Eileen O'Hare & Chris Alberghini & Mike Chessler; Teleplay by : Eileen O'Hare	January 8, 1996	314	21.6
64	16	"Where's Fran?"	Dorothy Lyman	Sally Lapiduss	January 15, 1996	315	19.4
65	17	"The Grandmas"	Dorothy Lyman	Caryn Lucas	January 22, 1996	316	18.8
66	18	"Val's Boyfriend"	Dorothy Lyman	Erik Mintz	February 5, 1996	317	18.7
67	19	"Love Is a Many Blundered Thing"	Dorothy Lyman	Dan Amernick & Jay Amernick	February 12, 1996	318	18.7
68	20	"Your Feets Too Big"	Dorothy Lyman	Sally Lapiduss	February 19, 1996	319	19.6
69	21	"Where's the Pearls?"	Dorothy Lyman	Frank Lombardi	February 26, 1996	320	20.4
70	22	"The Hockey Show"	Dorothy Lyman	Robbie Schwartz	March 4, 1996	321	17.8
71	23	"That's Midlife"	Dorothy Lyman	Caryn Lucas	March 11, 1996	322	18.3
72	24	"The Cantor Show"	Dorothy Lyman	Diane Wilk	April 29, 1996	323	16.9
73	25	"Green Card"	Dorothy Lyman	Story by : Jean Ford; Teleplay by : Rick Shaw	May 6, 1996	324	15.6
74	26	"Ship of Fran's"	Dorothy Lyman	Diane Wilk	May 13, 1996	326	17.4
75	27	"A Pup in Paris"	Dorothy Lyman	Diane Wilk	May 20, 1996	325	15.1

=== Season 4 (1996–97) ===
No. overall	No. in season	Title	Directed by	Written by	Original release date	Prod. code	U.S. viewers (millions)
76	1	"The Tart with Heart"	Dorothy Lyman	Frank Lombardi	September 18, 1996	403	15.1
77	2	"The Cradle Robbers"	Dorothy Lyman	Nastaran Dibai & Jeffrey B. Hodes	September 25, 1996	402	14.7
78	3	"The Bird's Nest"	Dorothy Lyman	Story by : Robbie Schwartz; Teleplay by : Jayne Hamil	September 25, 1996	401	17.8
79	4	"The Rosie Show"	Dorothy Lyman	Nastaran Dibai & Jeffrey B. Hodes	October 9, 1996	404	13.8
80	5	"Freida Needa Man"	Dorothy Lyman	Frank Lombardi	October 16, 1996	405	13.5
81	6	"Me and Mrs. Joan"	Dorothy Lyman	Peter Marc Jacobson	October 30, 1996	406	15.3
82	7	"The Taxman Cometh"	Dorothy Lyman	Dan Amernick & Jay Amernick	November 6, 1996	407	15.3
83	8	"An Affair to Dismember"	Dorothy Lyman	Diane Wilk	November 13, 1996	408	15.7
84	9	"Tattoo"	Dorothy Lyman	Caryn Lucas	November 20, 1996	409	15.5
85	10	"The Car Show"	Dorothy Lyman	Robbie Schwartz	December 11, 1996	410	12.7
86	11	"Hurricane Fran"	Dorothy Lyman	Rick Shaw	December 18, 1996	411	12.5
87	12	"Danny's Dead and Who's Got the Will?"	Dorothy Lyman	Jayne Hamil	January 8, 1997	412	15.75
88	13	"Kissing Cousins"	Dorothy Lyman	Caryn Lucas	January 15, 1997	413	13.04
89	14	"The Fifth Wheel"	Dorothy Lyman	Jayne Hamil	January 29, 1997	414	11.58
90	15	"The Nose Knows"	Dorothy Lyman	Story by : Suzanne Gangursky; Teleplay by : Rick Shaw	February 5, 1997	416	13.44
91	16	"The Bank Robbery"	Dorothy Lyman	Jayne Hamil	February 12, 1997	417	13.97
92	17	"Samson, He Denied Her"	Dorothy Lyman	Flo Cameron	February 19, 1997	415	13.60
93	18	"The Facts of Lice"	Dorothy Lyman	Nastaran Dibai & Jeffrey B. Hodes	March 5, 1997	418	12.61
94	19	"Fran's Roots"	Dorothy Lyman	Caryn Lucas	March 12, 1997	419	13.39
95	20	"The Nanny and the Hunk Producer"	Dorothy Lyman	Frank Lombardi	April 2, 1997	420	12.90
96	21	"The Passed-Over Story"	Dorothy Lyman	Rick Shaw	April 9, 1997	421	12.50
97	22	"No Muse is Good Muse"	Dorothy Lyman	Jayne Hamil	April 23, 1997	422	11.63
98	23	"You Bette Your Life"	Dorothy Lyman	Frank Lombardi	April 30, 1997	423	11.23
99	24	"The Heather Biblow Story"	Dorothy Lyman	Ivan Menchell	May 7, 1997	426	10.88
100	25	"The Boca Story"	Dorothy Lyman	Caryn Lucas	May 14, 1997	425	11.12
101	26	"Fran's Gotta Have It"	Dorothy Lyman	Diane Wilk	May 21, 1997	424	10.84

=== Season 5 (1997–98) ===
No. overall	No. in season	Title	Directed by	Written by	Original release date	Prod. code	U.S. viewers (millions)
102	1	"The Morning After"	Dorothy Lyman	Caryn Lucas	October 1, 1997	501	12.19
103	2	"First Date"	Dorothy Lyman	Story by : Frank Lombardi & Sarah McMullen; Teleplay by : Frank Lombardi	October 8, 1997	502	13.53
104	3	"The Bobbie Fleckman Story"	Dorothy Lyman	Diane Wilk	October 15, 1997	503	11.94
105	4	"Fransom"	Dorothy Lyman	Jayne Hamil	October 22, 1997	505	11.09
106	5	"The Ex-Niles"	Dorothy Lyman	Jeffrey B. Hodes & Nastaran Dibai	October 29, 1997	506	10.99
107	6	"A Decent Proposal"	Dorothy Lyman	Ivan Menchell	November 5, 1997	504	13.52
108	7	"Mommy and Mai"	Dorothy Lyman	Caryn Lucas	November 12, 1997	507	11.74
109	8	"Fair Weather Fran"	Dorothy Lyman	Rick Shaw	November 19, 1997	508	10.34
110	9	"Educating Fran"	Dorothy Lyman	Suzanne Gangursky	December 10, 1997	509	10.39
111	10	"From Flushing with Love"	Dorothy Lyman	Story by : Dan Amernick & Jay Amernick and Sean Hanley; Teleplay by : Dan Amernick & Jay Amernick	December 17, 1997	510	9.54
112	11	"Rash to Judgment"	Dorothy Lyman	Ivan Menchell	January 7, 1998	513	10.79
113	12	"One False Mole and You're Dead"	Dorothy Lyman	Frank Lombardi	January 14, 1998	511	10.29
114	13	"Call Me Fran"	Fran Drescher	Diane Wilk	January 21, 1998	512	10.76
115	14	"Not Without My Nanny"	Dorothy Lyman	Nastaran Dibai & Jeffrey B. Hodes	January 28, 1998	514	9.33
116	15	"The Engagement"	Dorothy Lyman	Rick Shaw	March 4, 1998	515	12.41
117	16	"The Dinner Party"	Dorothy Lyman	Ivan Menchell	March 11, 1998	516	12.28
118	17	"Homie-Work"	Dorothy Lyman	Jayne Hamil	March 18, 1998	517	11.32
119	18	"The Reunion Show"	Dorothy Lyman	Suzanne Gangursky & Sean Hanley	March 25, 1998	518	11.01
120	19	"Immaculate Concepcion"	Dorothy Lyman	Story by : Fran Drescher & Robert Sternin; Teleplay by : Robert Sternin	April 1, 1998	520	11.69
121	20	"The Pre-Nup"	Peter Marc Jacobson	Frank Lombardi	April 29, 1998	519	10.88
122	21	"The Best Man"	Dorothy Lyman	Rick Shaw	May 6, 1998	521	10.25
123	22	"The Wedding"	Peter Marc Jacobson	Caryn Lucas	May 13, 1998	522A-522B	16.73
124	23	"The Wedding"	Peter Marc Jacobson	Caryn Lucas	May 13, 1998	522A-522B	16.73

=== Season 6 (1998–99) ===
No. overall	No. in season	Title	Directed by	Written by	Original release date	Prod. code	U.S. viewers (millions)
125	1	"The Honeymoon's Overboard"	Peter Marc Jacobson	Frank Lombardi	September 30, 1998	601	11.51
126	2	"Fran Gets Shushed"	Peter Marc Jacobson	Caryn Lucas	October 7, 1998	602	9.67
127	3	"Once a Secretary, Always a Secretary"	Peter Marc Jacobson	Allen Jay Zipper	October 14, 1998	603	9.39
128	4	"Sara's Parents"	Peter Marc Jacobson	Jayne Hamil	October 21, 1998	604	8.89
129	5	"Maggie's Boyfriend"	Peter Marc Jacobson	Rick Shaw	October 28, 1998	605	9.33
130	6	"I'm Pregnant"	Peter Marc Jacobson	Ivan Menchell	November 4, 1998	606	9.34
131	7	"Mom's the Word"	Peter Marc Jacobson	Cody Farley & Suzanne Myers	November 11, 1998	607	11.11
132	8	"Making Whoopi"	Peter Marc Jacobson	Suzanne Gangursky	November 18, 1998	608	9.53
133	9	"Oh, Say, Can You Ski?"	Peter Marc Jacobson	Dan Amernick & Jay Amernick	November 25, 1998	609	9.25
134	10	"The Hanukkah Story"	Peter Marc Jacobson	Story by : Matthew J. Berman; Teleplay by : Ivan Menchell	December 16, 1998	611	7.58
135	11	"The In-Law Who Came Forever"	Peter Marc Jacobson	Story by : Danny Passman & Michael Scalisi; Teleplay by : Rick Shaw	January 6, 1999	610	9.16
136	12	"The Fran in the Mirror"	Jennifer Reed	Story by : Chandler Evans; Teleplay by : Jayne Hamil	January 20, 1999	612	8.25
137	13	"The Yummy Mummy"	Peter Marc Jacobson	Cody Farley & Suzanne Myers	February 3, 1999	613	7.72
138	14	"California, Here We Come"	Peter Marc Jacobson	Story by : Mary Lindes; Teleplay by : Suzanne Gangursky	March 31, 1999	614	8.12
139	15	"Ma'ternal Affairs"	Peter Marc Jacobson	Frank Lombardi	June 2, 1999	615	6.36
140	16	"The Producers"	Peter Marc Jacobson	Story by : Mike Dow & Chandler Evans; Teleplay by : Rick Shaw	June 9, 1999	616	6.44
141	17	"The Dummy Twins"	Steve Posner	Story by : Rachel Chagall & Harriet Goldman & Camelia Kath & Ivan Menchell; Teleplay by : Ivan Menchell	June 16, 1999	617	5.96
142	18	"Yetta's Letters"	Peter Marc Jacobson	Story by : Bernie Vyzga; Teleplay by : Dan Amernick & Jay Amernick	June 16, 1999	619	6.60
143	19	"Maggie's Wedding"	Fran Drescher	Jayne Hamil	June 23, 1999	618	6.43
144	20	"The Baby Shower"	Peter Marc Jacobson	Story by : Howard Preiser & James Nelson & Sean Hanley; Teleplay by : Cody Farley & Suzanne Myers	June 23, 1999	620	7.04
145	21	"The Finale: Part 1"	Peter Marc Jacobson	Caryn Lucas	May 12, 1999	621	11.11
146	22	"The Finale: Part 2"	Peter Marc Jacobson	Caryn Lucas & Peter Marc Jacobson & Frank Lombardi	May 12, 1999	622	11.11
