= The Nanny season 2 =

The Nanny
- Season 2
- DVD cover
- No. of episodes: 26

Release
- Original network: CBS
- Original release: September 12, 1994 – May 22, 1995

Season chronology
- ← Previous; Season 1 Next → Season 3

The second season of the American television sitcom The Nanny aired on CBS from September 12, 1994, to May 22, 1995. The series was created by actress Fran Drescher and her-then husband Peter Marc Jacobson, and developed by Prudence Fraser and Robert Sternin. Produced by Sternin and Fraser Ink Inc. and TriStar Television, the series features Drescher, Jacobson, Fraser, Sternin, Caryn Lucas and Diane Wilk as executive producers.

Based on an idea inspired by Drescher's visit with a friend and The Sound of Music, the series revolves around Fran Fine, a Jewish woman from Flushing, Queens, New York, who is hired by a wealthy Broadway producer to be the nanny to his three children. Drescher stars as the titular character, Charles Shaughnessy as British-born producer Maxwell Sheffield, and the children – Maggie, Brighton and Grace – portrayed by Nicholle Tom, Benjamin Salisbury, and Madeline Zima. The series also features Daniel Davis as Niles, the family butler, and Lauren Lane as C.C. Babcock, Maxwell's associate in his production company who is smitten with him. Several recurring characters also played a role in the sitcom's plotlines, many of whom were related to Fran.

== Cast and characters ==
=== Main ===
- Fran Drescher as Fran Fine
- Charles Shaughnessy as Maxwell Sheffield
- Daniel Davis as Niles
- Lauren Lane as Chastity Claire "C.C" Babcock
- Nicholle Tom as Maggie Sheffield
- Benjamin Salisbury as Brighton Sheffield
- Madeline Zima as Grace Sheffield

=== Recurring ===
- Renée Taylor as Sylvia Fine
- Rachel Chagall as Val Toriello
- Ann Morgan Guilbert as Yetta Rosenberg

=== Special guest stars ===
- Richard Kind as Jeffrey Needleman
- Efrem Zimbalist Jr. as Theodore Timmons
- Ben Vereen as himself
- Wallace Shawn as Charles Haste
- Corbin Bernsen as Glen Mitchell
- Bob Barker as himself
- Sally Jessy Raphael as herself
- Erik Estrada as himself
- Steve Lawrence as himself
- Eydie Gormé as herself
- George Murdock as Dakota Williams
- Roger Clinton Jr. as himself
- Shari Lewis as herself
- Christina Pickles as Nurse
- Billy Ray Cyrus as himself
- Tyne Daly as Mona

=== Guest stars ===
- Tracy Kolis as Leslie
- Richard Kind as Jeffrey Needleman
- Bonnie Morgan as Brooke
- Ralph Manza as Saul
- Judith Hoag as Kathy Marie O'Malley / Katherine Porter
- Nancy Linari as Mrs. Livingston
- Nancy Lenehan as Russian Woman
- Dayton Callie as The Sergeant
- Richard Portnow as Phillipe
- Mort Drescher as Uncle Stanley
- Christopher Brand as Cousin Irving
- Zack Norman as Uncle Jack
- Nancy Frangione as Cousin Marsha
- Morgan Brittany as Judy Silverman
- Michael Winters as Doug Emerson
- Christopher Rich as Kurt Jacobs
- Jake Richardson as Willie
- Ellen Ratner as Nadine Cooperman
- Ron Orbach as Barry Cooperman
- Tracy Nelson as Mary Ruth
- Patrick Cassidy as Mr. Anthony
- Edward Hibbert as Claude
- J. D. Daniels as Jack Walker / Mimo
- Lauren Tom as Kim

== Episodes ==
No. overall	No. in season	Title	Directed by	Written by	Original release date	Prod. code	U.S. viewers (millions)
23	1	"Fran-Lite"	Lee Shallat	Janis Hirsch	September 12, 1994	201	17.6
The children are heading back to school, but Brighton refuses to go back because he feels "small" compared to other boys in middle school. Fran misconstrues this when Brighton tells her he was in the locker room at the time, to which Fran describes to Maxwell as being "gherkin". Maxwell exclaims "But he has such big feet!" (alluding to the myth of large features corresponding to a larger genital size.) Maxwell starts dating a woman, Leslie, who looks and sounds exactly like Fran.
24	2	"The Playwright"	Gail Mancuso	Lisa Medway	September 19, 1994	123	17.4
In order to teach Brighton a lesson about rejecting girls, Fran goes on a date with a man named Jeffrey that she had rejected back in high school. Jeffrey, now a playwright, threatens to commit suicide unless Maxwell buys his piece and turns it into a Broadway play.
25	3	"Everybody Needs a Bubby"	Lee Shallat	Diane Wilk	September 26, 1994	204	18.5
While the retirement home gets fumigated, Grandma Yetta comes to stay at the Sheffield mansion, but when she starts passing some of her "wisdom" among the children, Fran and Maxwell are concerned.
26	4	"Material Fran"	Lee Shallat	Eileen O'Hare	October 3, 1994	203	18.3
One of Fran's old high school friends sets her up with her husband's business partner to see how she likes someone who is loaded. The idea would sound mighty fine if Fran's date (Efrem Zimbalist Jr.) was not so old.
27	5	"Curse of the Grandmas"	Lee Shallat	Eric Cohen	October 10, 1994	202	18.7
It is the first anniversary since Fran started working for the Sheffields, but Maxwell does not seem to recall this very important occasion. Fran leads Gracie's girl scout troop to "adopt" their very own grandmas at Yetta's retirement home, but each of Gracie's grandmas die.
28	6	"The Nanny Napper"	Lee Shallat	Jayne Hamil & Rick Shaw	October 17, 1994	205	18.2
When Fran offers to hold an Eastern European woman's baby on the subway, she inadvertently "kidnaps" the child when his mother walks off the train without realizing it. The Sheffields think that the woman deliberately abandoned her son, and make plans to care for him—only to get a nasty surprise when Fran is arrested for kidnapping. It seems that things will end badly, until a love of soap operas bonds Fran, the mother, and even the police chief and helps solve the issue.
29	7	"A Star Is Unborn"	Gail Mancuso	Pamela Eells & Sally Lapiduss	October 24, 1994	124	18.6
Fran is hired by an avant-garde director to play Juliet in a reproduction of Romeo and Juliet. Unbeknownst to her, the director is hoping for the play to fail so that he can do better on his taxes. Meanwhile, Maggie wants to go to the Hamptons, but Maxwell will not allow it. Fran tries to convince him otherwise. Maxwell and Fran also share their second kiss during a rehearsal of the play. This is the first episode where Fran explicitly tells Maxwell she wants to be more to him (romantically) than just the nanny. When C.C. discovers the truth, Maxwell takes it upon himself to save Fran, only for her to choose to leave the play on her own terms.
30	8	"Pishke Business"	Lee Shallat	Alan R. Cohen & Alan Freedland	October 31, 1994	206	17.6
Sylvia and her canasta club want to invest their pishke in Maxwell's next play, but there may not be a play when C.C. assaults Maxwell's other investor (Wallace Shawn). Since the investor does not know what C.C. looks like, Fran poses as her in order to save the play.
31	9	"Stock Tip"	Lee Shallat	Story by : Rob Schwartz & Bill Lawrence; Teleplay by : David M. Matthews	November 7, 1994	208	20.5
Fran meets a man, Glen (Corbin Bernsen), at the supermarket; he tells her that he works on Wall Street and later convinces Maxwell into investing $100,000 in stocks. Everything goes well at first, but Fran later learns that Glen is a hot dog vendor who literally works on Wall Street. Fran sets out to prevent Maxwell from being scammed by infiltrating an exclusive gentleman's club, prompting her to disguise herself as a man to gain entry.
32	10	"The Whine Cellar"	Lee Shallat	Eileen O'Hare	November 14, 1994	210	19.8
It is Sylvia's "50th" birthday and Fran is the hostess. However, when she and C.C. accidentally lock themselves inside the wine cellar, the two must learn to tolerate each other.
33	11	"When You Pish Upon a Star"	Lee Shallat	Diane Wilk	November 21, 1994	209	19.5
When Maxwell casts a major child star named Jack Walker, whose sitcom almost perfectly mirrors the Sheffields' lives, into his new production of Oliver!, Fran is enlisted to look after the obnoxious child. Things start to heat up when Fran convinces Jack to quit show business. Maxwell and Fran share their third kiss.
34	12	"Take Back Your Mink"	Lee Shallat	Fran Drescher & Peter Marc Jacobson	November 21, 1994	207	20.3
Fran's great-aunt dies and leaves Fran her coveted mink coat. Maggie's obsessive belief in animal rights prompts Fran to reject the coat, pitting her against her mother. Eventually Sylvia sells the coat to C.C. for $10,000.
35	13	"The Strike"	Lee Shallat	Janis Hirsch	November 28, 1994	211	19.4
Maxwell and Fran attract unwanted press attention due to an incident on the opening night of Maxwell's latest play: Maxwell forces Fran to cross a picket line.
36	14	"I've Got a Secret"	Lee Shallat	Eric Cohen	December 12, 1994	213	17.5
When Maxwell invites a high-profile actress to recover at his house from plastic surgery, Fran goes to great lengths to find out who she is. Eventually, she discovers that the mystery guest is Cher. She blabs to Val, who apparently spreads the news. Thankfully, Fran manages to think of a way to scare off reporters, involving one of her cross-dressing cousins who imitates Cher. In the end, it turns out that the press didn't learn about Cher from Val, but from a friend of Maxwell's to whom he blabbed. Meanwhile, Brighton borrows a parrot from a friend despite his reputation of forgetting to feed his pets.
37	15	"Kindervelt Days"	Lee Shallat	Frank Lombardi & Dana Reston	January 2, 1995	212	23.1
Sylvia is turning the storage room into a den for Morty, so they go through Fran's old junk and find some remarkable things, including a "win a date with Erik Estrada" entry form. Meanwhile, Fran is invited to attend the reunion for her Kindervelt summer camp and invites Maxwell as her date to impress her camp friends. But the kids surprise Fran when they bring Erik Estrada himself to escort Fran. They go to the reunion, but while Erik is polite and kind to Fran, he leaves early, as his seeing her was only a publicity stunt. This depresses Fran, but Maxwell arrives to escort her; he also inadvertently humiliates Fran's rival when her own date meets Maxwell and reveals himself as a gay dancer trying to make it on Broadway. Meanwhile, C.C. quits smoking and develops food cravings, so Niles provides her with a ready supply of fatty treats in the hopes of making her gain weight.
38	16	"Canasta Masta"	Lee Shallat	Dana Reston & Frank Lombardi	January 9, 1995	214	19.5
Maxwell wants Brighton to play a sport, but he fails at all things athletic. He soon discovers that he has a talent for canasta, and joins Sylvia and Yetta's team. Unfortunately, Sylvia decides to kick Fran out of the group to make room for Brighton, causing a rift between the Fines. The family travels to Atlantic City for a championship, where Fran bumps into Steve Lawrence and Eydie Gorme, while trying to solve her problem. Brighton eventually convinces the Fine women to make up, and Fran joins the group for the championship. Meanwhile, Niles, alone in the house and supposedly bored, parodies the dancing scene in Risky Business until C.C. returns.
39	17	"The Will"	Randy Bennett	Story by : Robbie Schwartz; Teleplay by : Fran Drescher & Peter Marc Jacobson	January 16, 1995	215	18.5
Maxwell is preparing his will and wants to include Fran in it, naming her the children's guardian in the event of his premature death. C.C. and Maxwell are having Doug Emerson (one of Andrew Lloyd Webber's former investors) for dinner, and his doctor sends his special diet from the American Heart Association. Fran happens upon it and mistakenly believes that Maxwell is dying; to "save" his life, she gives all the fatty food from the dinner to Doug, which triggers a trip to the hospital for the investor. Meanwhile, one of Gracie's friends has a crush on Brighton, and Fran must play peacemaker.
40	18	"The Nanny Behind the Man"	Lee Shallat	Story by : Rob Lotterstein & Ellen Idelson; Teleplay by : Jerry Perzigian	January 23, 1995	216	18.4
Maxwell wants to secure the rights to a legendary playwright's latest work, and prepares to wine and dine him. Fran helps out by offering a woman to woo the playwright: Yetta. The two hit it off, and Maxwell is thrilled—until complications begin to arise.
41	19	"A Fine Friendship"	Lee Shallat	Story by : Kirsten Vensel & Bill Marich & Rich Ross; Teleplay by : Eileen O'Hare	February 6, 1995	217	19.1
Gracie meets a new friend who has a male nanny. He and Fran hit it off, and become great friends--but only because Fran thinks that he is homosexual. Meanwhile, after overhearing Fran talking about a soap opera, Grace becomes convinced she is pregnant after "sleeping with" her friend (that is, taking a nap together). Fran and Maxwell get into a compromising position in her bedroom, which Niles delights in telling C.C.
42	20	"Lamb Chop's On the Menu"	Lee Shallat	Frank Lombardi & Dana Reston	February 13, 1995	218	19.0
Fran offers to care for Chester while C.C. is having some work done in her apartment. Meanwhile, C.C. secures the film rights for "Lamb Chop: The Movie". Maxwell invites guest star Shari Lewis to stay at his house, prompting a starstruck Fran and Val to snoop around her guest room. While there, she accidentally lets Chester loose, who, she believes, eats Lamb Chop. Knowing she'll get in trouble, Fran makes a "Fran-Chop", a modified version of Lamb Chop, but Niles finds the real puppet in the laundry basket. Lamb Chop then decides to have a private meeting with Maxwell about the film rights, and kicks all of the women--including Shari--out of his office.
43	21	"Close Shave"	Dorothy Lyman	Elliot Stern	February 20, 1995	219	19.0
Fran earns Maggie a job as a hospital candy striper. Meanwhile, Maxwell learns why he should not accept food from C.C. The two paths cross when Maxwell needs an appendectomy...on the same day Fran is covering for Maggie and Fran must "shave" Maxwell for the surgery, prompting a hilarious scene.
44	22	"What the Butler Sang"	Lee Shallat	Diane Wilk	February 27, 1995	220	19.3
Fran discovers that Niles has a beautiful singing voice and convinces him to audition for Maxwell's next play. Meanwhile, she asks her sister Nadine to assume Niles' cooking duties. Nadine, who recently left her husband, attempts to seduce Maxwell. Nadine starts to annoy Fran, who calls Nadine's husband to come retrieve her. They have a big argument that almost ruined Niles's audition, but is a success among the investors.
45	23	"A Kiss Is Just a Kiss"	Dorothy Lyman	Eileen O'Hare	May 3, 1995	223	11.4
Fran encourages Maggie to enter Billy Ray Cyrus's kissing contest to be on the cover of his next album, but Fran wins by accident. Maxwell is convinced that her kissing abilities aren't what got her to win, so Fran proves him wrong in a very good way (They share their fourth kiss). When she meets Billy Ray, his manager tells her it's because she makes him look younger. Offended, Fran turns down the offer and returns home depressed about her age. Niles tells C.C., who can't wait to tell Maxwell. She tries to kiss him, but accidentally kisses Niles, and Maxwell comforts Fran.
46	24	"Strange Bedfellows"	Dorothy Lyman	Frank Lombardi & Dana Reston	May 8, 1995	224	14.0
Fran's friend Mona (Tyne Daly), is retiring, and Fran sees parallels between their situations and struggle with her possible future roles after the children are grown. Fran draws comparisons and becomes terrified by the fact that Mona does not seem to have anywhere to go but back to her mother and grandmother, with few prospects or opportunities. Meanwhile, C.C.'s birthday is coming up, and only Niles remembers, while Maxwell is suffering from a cold and spends the day knocked out by his medicine. Fran attends Mona's retirement party and returns home a little drunk, ending up passed out in Maxwell's bed, a scene which Niles gleefully shows to C.C. as her "birthday present". Mona's boss proposes to her after her retirement party, and Maxwell assuring Fran that he will "take care of [her] for the rest of [her] life" leads her and Niles to believe he will also propose, until he reveals he has bought her a retirement condo, much to Fran's disappointment and Niles' exasperation. At the end of the episode Maxwell and Fran simultaneously realise that they had sex while intoxicated.
47	25	"The Chatterbox"	Lee Shallat	Story by : Fran Drescher & Peter Marc Jacobson; Teleplay by : Robert Sternin & Prudence Fraser	May 15, 1995	221	13.2
Maggie is invited to her first sweet sixteen party, so Fran takes her to The Chatterbox, her favorite beauty salon. Meanwhile, Maxwell is holding auditions for his next play, and a girl named Mary Ruth is rejected. She befriends Fran, who takes her to The Chatterbox to see if she can become the new shampoo girl (a job Sylvia also wants). There, Mary Ruth soon noses herself into the personal life of the owner, Mr. Anthony, and his son, Mimo, who are trying to live without Mr. Anthony's wife, Mimo's mother. Employees at the salon include Claude, a gay hairdresser, and Kim, the Chinese manicurist who can paint incredible things on her extra-long nails. Note: This episode served as a backdoor pilot for a spin-off series centered on The Chatterbox beauty salon.
48	26	"Fran Gets Mugged"	Lee Shallat	Jayne Hamil & Rick Shaw	May 22, 1995	222	14.2
Maxwell plans to donate a rare piece of Shakespeare's original handwriting to a museum. Fran accidentally places the list in her purse, and loses it when she is mugged. She becomes paranoid and more problems arise. The mugger is eventually apprehended and encounters Fran and Maxwell while serving community service. He returns the manuscript and offers them two tickets to a Shakespeare festival. Fran and Maxwell share a tender moment after returning from the festival, which is ruined when they find the mugger has robbed the house and left Niles bound and gagged in the living room.
