= The Nanny season 3 =

Third season of television series The Nanny

The Nanny
- Season 3
- DVD cover
- No. of episodes: 27

Release
- Original network: CBS
- Original release: September 11, 1995 – May 20, 1996

Season chronology
- ← Previous; Season 2 Next → Season 4

The third season of the American television sitcom The Nanny aired on CBS from September 11, 1995, to May 20, 1996. The series was created by actress Fran Drescher and her-then husband Peter Marc Jacobson, and developed by Prudence Fraser and Robert Sternin. Produced by Sternin and Fraser Ink Inc. (except for Oy to the World), Highschool Sweethearts (starting with Dope Diamond) and TriStar Television, the series features Drescher, Jacobson, Fraser, Sternin, Caryn Lucas and Diane Wilk as executive producers.

Based on an idea inspired by Drescher's visit with a friend and The Sound of Music, the series revolves around Fran Fine, a Jewish woman from Flushing, Queens, New York, who is hired by a wealthy Broadway producer to be the nanny to his three children. Drescher stars as the titular character, Charles Shaughnessy as British-born producer Maxwell Sheffield, and the children – Maggie, Brighton and Grace – portrayed by Nicholle Tom, Benjamin Salisbury, and Madeline Zima. The series also features Daniel Davis as Niles, the family butler, and Lauren Lane as C.C. Babcock, Maxwell's associate in his production company who is smitten with him. Several recurring characters also played a role in the sitcoms plotlines, many of whom were related to Fran.

== Cast and characters ==
=== Main ===
- Fran Drescher as Fran Fine
- Charles Shaughnessy as Maxwell Sheffield
- Daniel Davis as Niles
- Lauren Lane as Chastity Claire "C.C" Babcock
- Nicholle Tom as Maggie Sheffield
- Benjamin Salisbury as Brighton Sheffield
- Madeline Zima as Grace Sheffield

=== Recurring ===
- Renée Taylor as Sylvia Fine
- Rachel Chagall as Val Toriello
- Ann Morgan Guilbert as Yetta Rosenberg

=== Special guest stars ===
- Florence Griffith Joyner as herself
- Alex Trebek as himself
- Roger Clinton Jr. as himself
- Lainie Kazan as Aunt Freida
- David L. Lander as the Landlord
- Catherine Oxenberg as Sydney Mercer
- Milton Berle as Uncle Manny
- Dina Merrill as Elizabeth Sheffield
- Virginia Graham as herself
- Todd Oldham as himself
- John Astin as Dr. Roberts
- Elizabeth Taylor as herself
- Rosie O'Donnell as Cozette
- Joyce Brothers as Dr. Joyce Brothers
- Monica Seles as herself
- Burt Bacharach as himself
- Harry Van Gorkum as Nigel Sheffield
- Eartha Kitt as herself

=== Guest stars ===
- Michael McKean as Professor Noel Babcock PhD
- Ian Buchanan as Jules Kimball
- Kane Picoy as Jeff
- Allan Rich as The Judge
- Donna Dixon as Monica Baker
- Lorna Luft as Cousin Susan Rosenberg
- Zack Norman as Uncle Jack Rosenberg
- Mort Drescher as Uncle Stanley
- Burke Moses as Tony Tatorri
- Pamela Hayden as Chester the Dog (voice)
- Marilyn Cooper as Grandma Nettie
- James DiStefano as Pauly
- Marvin Hamlisch as Alan Neider
- Michael Bacall as Tommy Altman
- John Bishop as Shoe Salesman
- Anthony Addabbo as Mike LaVoe
- Paolo Seganti as Philippe
- David Starzyk as Steve Goodman
- Tim Bagley as Flight Attendant

== Episodes ==
No. overall	No. in season	Title	Directed by	Written by	Original release date	Prod. code	U.S. viewers (millions)
49	1	"Pen Pal"	Dorothy Lyman	Jayne Hamil & Rick Shaw	September 11, 1995	303	17.6
After many years of exchanging letters, Fran's pen pal Lenny wants to meet her. Fran is worried because over the past years she exaggerated the facts about her life and now is concerned that Lenny will not like her for who she really is. Maxwell encourages her to attend the date (more because he wants to see Lenny than because he wants Fran to meet him) and waits for him with her at the Russian Tea Room. However, Lenny never appears and leaves a note at the door saying he could not possibly compete with the handsome man she was sitting with (Maxwell). Meanwhile, C.C. arranges to work late just to seduce Maxwell, and Niles plays a trick on her. Bored, the two have a few drinks and have their first romantic kiss after trading insults.
50	2	"Franny and the Professor"	Dorothy Lyman	Janis Hirsch	September 18, 1995	302	19.3
C.C. makes a bet with her brother Noel that he cannot get Fran (who can be quite ditzy sometimes but has an encyclopedic knowledge of popular culture) to play Jeopardy!. However, Fran somehow enters the game and manages to win. Meanwhile, Maxwell is upset because he is not invited to the Renaissance Weekend held by Bill Clinton, but Fran gets him tickets with the help of the Sheffields' new next-door neighbor, Roger Clinton Jr. Guest stars Alex Trebek and Michael McKean.
51	3	"Dope Diamond"	Dorothy Lyman	Diane Wilk	September 25, 1995	304	18.0
Fran has been dating a wealthy, handsome British-Jewish doctor named Jules Kimble. After only two weeks, he asks her to marry him. Although having some doubts, Fran accepts after Sylvia strong-arms her. When they go shopping for a ring, Jules disappears with a very expensive ring. Fran learns that he was actually a thief and now she is left all alone. She blames her mother for the disaster and the Fine women see a therapist (Cynthia L. James) to resolve their problems. Back at home, both Maxwell and Fran complain about the lack of single attractive people for them to date, yet they describe each other.
52	4	"A Fine Family Feud"	Dorothy Lyman	Frank Lombardi	October 2, 1995	301	17.6
Maggie's 16th birthday approaches and Fran intervenes in Maxwell's plans for her party. Instead of a boring party at the Guggenheim Museum, Fran convinces Maxwell to host it at her "Tanta" (Aunt) Frieda's club. Maggie loves the idea, but before the party can take place, Fran has to solve a serious family feud: her mother and Frieda (Lainie Kazan) have not spoken since 1979. The sisters-in-law eventually make peace with some prompting from Fran (and Niles's chocolate cake), and the party begins. During the event, Frieda has a wardrobe malfunction when she emerges from the bathroom, which reminds her of why she and Sylvia fought in the first place. They start a food fight which quickly spreads to the whole party. When Maxwell enters, he is shocked and about to scold Fran when Maggie thanks them for the best party ever.
53	5	"Val's Apartment"	Dorothy Lyman	Pamela Eells & Sally Lapiduss	October 9, 1995	305	17.3
Feeling that taking care of the children has taken over her life and overshadowed her personal life, Fran considers moving out of the mansion. She receives the real push from Maxwell who assures her she cannot do it. Fran and Val rent a small garden-level apartment together in a building full of gay men. Fran misses the mansion, but does not want to give Maxwell the pleasure of being right. What she does not know is that he also longs for her to return. They secretly ask for Sylvia's help, and Fran finally moves back to the mansion. David Lander guest stars as the landlord.
54	6	"Shopaholic"	Dorothy Lyman	Eric Cohen	October 16, 1995	307	19.8
When Val announces that Danny Imperali, Fran's former boyfriend, is going to marry Heather Biblow, Fran claims that she is perfectly fine with the news. However, she develops a severe case of compulsive shopping as a result, worrying the family. Fran is eventually urged into "Shoppers Anonymous" with the help of the Sheffields, but finds the temptation of making purchases hard to resist. It takes some help from Max—namely, his and Fran's fifth kiss—to overcome the addiction.
55	7	"Oy Vey, You're Gay"	Dorothy Lyman	Eileen O'Hare	October 23, 1995	306	18.8
Fran encourages Maxwell to retire his wedding ring, while C.C. points out that Andrew Lloyd Webber was featured in the paper's crossword puzzle, prompting Maxwell to hire a publicist to improve his image and make him more popular. He hires the gorgeous Sydney Mercer and radically changes his image to a middle-aged "bad boy". He starts to fall for Sydney, causing both Fran and C.C. to become jealous. They set a date in the Rainbow Room, but Fran discovers at the last minute that Sydney is a lesbian and is actually interested in her. Fran rushes to meet with Maxwell, but they end up trapped in the elevator.
56	8	"The Party's Over"	Dorothy Lyman	Caryn Lucas	November 6, 1995	308	19.6
Maxwell and C.C. are going to Boston for the weekend, but what originally started as a romantic getaway plan for C.C. turned into family weekend thanks to Niles. Fran, Maggie, and Niles have the house to themselves, and Fran and Val decide to throw a singles party at the house to fish an eligible bachelor. However, the party is over when Jeff, an undercover police officer, arrives and arrests Fran for not having the required licenses. After spending the night in jail, Fran returns home and Maxwell almost fires her, but Maggie steps in and takes the responsibility for the mess to help Fran. Fran goes to court, but Maxwell shows up at the last minute to help prevent her senile lawyer, Uncle Mannie, from ruining the case.
57	9	"The Two Mrs. Sheffields"	Dorothy Lyman	Diane Wilk	November 13, 1995	309	20.9
Fran scuffles with a woman while purchasing flowers to welcome Maxwell's mother, who is visiting. The woman later arrives at the Sheffield house, where Fran learns she is Mrs. Elizabeth Sheffield. Mrs. Sheffield annoys everyone in the house except for C.C., who immediately tells her that Fran has her eye on Maxwell. Mrs. Sheffield tells her son to fire the nanny as she assumes they are in a relationship and does not want history repeating itself like his father (addressed in season 4's "Me and Mrs. Joan"), but Maxwell proposes to Fran instead just to spite his mother. When Fran realizes the proposal is not real, she decides to toy with Maxwell and make him feel guilty for the insincere proposal.
58	10	"Having His Baby"	Dorothy Lyman	Erik Mintz	November 20, 1995	310	17.7
Fran considers a sperm bank in order to have a baby after learning that her ex-fiance Danny has fathered a child, much to Sylvia and Maxwell's distress. Donna Dixon guest stars as Monica Baker.
59	11	"The Unkindest Cut"	Dorothy Lyman	Frank Lombardi	November 27, 1995	311	16.0
Sylvia hires Brighton to film the bris of a cousin of Fran's. Brighton has no idea what a bris is and passes out during the most important moment of the party. Fran sends his video to America's Wackiest Home Videos, and they are selected to appear on the show. The entire family goes to Hollywood and tour around some filming lots. Fran gets lost while looking for a restroom and ends up on the Dr. Quinn, Medicine Woman set. After being ejected from the studio several times (and attempting to re-enter just as many times), they return to New York to discover that Maxwell's book will be published. Just another result of Fran's work (and the $2,500 she paid a vanity press). Guest stars: Jane Seymour, Lorna Luft, and Joe Lando.: Recording date: November 17, 1995
60	12	"The Kibbutz"	Dorothy Lyman	Frank Lombardi	December 4, 1995	312	18.3
Maxwell decides to send Maggie off to a convent in Switzerland and wants Fran to tell her the news. Fran instead suggests sending Maggie to a kibbutz in Israel, which she and Val did together at Maggie's age. While not happy with her decision, Maxwell eventually agrees. Fran later remembers that she hated the kibbutz and lost her "hat" (that is, virginity) there. She then tries to convince Maxwell to reverse his decision, resulting in the whole family visiting the kibbutz. Meanwhile, Niles has the holidays for himself and C.C. teases him for being cheap. They both plan separate holidays, but end up together.
61	13	"An Offer She Can't Refuse"	Dorothy Lyman	Jayne Hamil & Rick Shaw	December 11, 1995	313	18.9
Grace and her new friend Frankie play violin together, and when Fran meets Frankie's handsome, rich father, Tony Tattori, the two are mutually attracted and begin dating. However, Fran eventually discovers that Tony is a mobster, and realizes that she must break up with him—but worries that if she does, she will be "rubbed out". Maxwell, who does not understand Fran's predicament, tries to break them up himself, which seems like a disaster—until Tony realizes that Maxwell is a Broadway producer and offers to appear in his latest show (which is needed after C.C. fires Whoopi Goldberg from A Night with Whoopi Goldberg). Meanwhile, Brighton steals Maggie's diary and makes her his personal slave until Fran offers some incriminating evidence against him.
62	14	"Oy to the World"	Lauren MacMullan	Fran Drescher & Peter Marc Jacobson	December 18, 1995	327	11.5
In this animated Christmas special, Brighton is more concerned with receiving presents than the spirit of giving, so Fran decides to take him to a homeless shelter to teach him about the less fortunate. On their way, the two (along with C.C.'s dog Chester) are swept up in a winter storm and find themselves at the North Pole, where Santa Claus (who looks identical to Maxwell) and his elves (including Maggie, Grace, and a lounge-singing Niles) are struggling to defend the holiday from the Ice Princess of the North, "C.C. the Abominable Babcock". Fran eventually solves the problem, saves Christmas, and even teaches Brighton the true meaning of the holiday. Guest stars: Pamela Hayden and Maurice LaMarche.
63	15	"Fashion Show"	Dorothy Lyman	Story by : Eileen O'Hare & Chris Alberghini & Mike Chessler; Teleplay by : Eileen O'Hare	January 8, 1996	314	21.6
When Maxwell insists that Fran rush to make a party on time, she accidentally grabs a purse that does not match with her outfit. A photo of her faux pas appears in a "Fashion Don'ts" list of a popular magazine, much to her chagrin. To apologize, Maxwell lets Fran design the costumes for a scene from Our Town that he is producing in a revue (for once, it is C.C. who gets kissed from Maxwell as a thank you for the idea). Everyone fears that her costumes will ruin the scene—but with help from her cousin Todd Oldham, she steals the show.
64	16	"Where's Fran?"	Dorothy Lyman	Sally Lapiduss	January 15, 1996	315	19.4
Fran catches Maggie smoking with her boyfriend. She does not want to tell Maxwell and lose Maggie's trust, so she allows Maxwell to catch her smoking, hoping his reaction will create an example for Maggie. However, Maxwell oversteps which results in Fran leaving the house. After a few hours of wondering where she is (and remembering all the unique situations they all have been since Fran arrived at the house), Maxwell finds her at neighbor Roger Clinton's, where Fran pretends to have an offer from Hillary Clinton hoping it will prod Maxwell to beg for her return.: Recording date: December 12; 14, 1995
65	17	"The Grandmas"	Dorothy Lyman	Caryn Lucas	January 22, 1996	316	18.8
Fran feels like Maxwell's life is falling into a routine and convinces him to change. Meanwhile, she is terrified to learn that her mother kicked her father out of the house and goes to her grandmothers for help. When Gracie does not want Fran to go on her play dates anymore, Fran wants everything go back to the way it was. When Sylvia and Morty finally make up, Fran still has to convince Maxwell not to make big changes in his life.: Recording date: January 12, 1996
66	18	"Val's Boyfriend"	Dorothy Lyman	Erik Mintz	February 5, 1996	317	18.7
Val gets a new boyfriend and Fran goes through an unusual situation: her best friend has a date and she doesn't! When Val's boyfriend makes a move on Fran, she thinks it's just jealousy and goes out with C.C., but later Val's boyfriend goes a little too far. Meanwhile, C.C. asks Maxwell for an equal partnership, and after he denies it, she quits. She pretends to have formed a new partnership with Marvin Hamlisch just to make Maxwell jealous, and later begs Fran to help reunite her with Maxwell. Fran does so by getting her old music teacher--who happens to look exactly like Marvin (and is played by him)--to pretend to be Hamlisch and convince Maxwell to take C.C. back.
67	19	"Love Is a Many Blundered Thing"	Dorothy Lyman	Dan Amernick & Jay Amernick	February 12, 1996	318	18.7
Fran is upset because Valentine's Day is approaching and she does not have a date, but her spirits improve when she scores a date with Jeff. She encourages Maxwell to get a date himself, and shortly thereafter an anonymous valentine appears on Fran's purse. She automatically thinks it is from Maxwell and rents a huge billboard asking for Maxwell to be her valentine. When she discovers the card was from Brighton's friend, Fran and Val rush to Times Square to try to erase the billboard before Maxwell sees it. Due to an accident, Fran is left hanging from a rope and Maxwell comes to her rescue.
68	20	"Your Feets Too Big"	Dorothy Lyman	Sally Lapiduss	February 19, 1996	319	19.6
When Sylvia decides to have plastic surgery on her arms, the doctor (John Astin) tells her it is normal at a certain age for body parts to grow. Fran initially disregards this until she notices that her feet have grown a whole size—which is bad news, as she is a former foot model with a reunion approaching. Luckily, she has Maxwell, who volunteers to escort her to the reunion.
69	21	"Where's the Pearls?"	Dorothy Lyman	Frank Lombardi	February 26, 1996	320	20.4
Maxwell has Elizabeth Taylor over, and as with all celebrities, Fran cannot control herself until she meets her. A very friendly Elizabeth asks Fran to take her black pearls necklace to a courier, but Fran, with prompting from Sylvia (who is also desperate to meet Elizabeth), decides to handle the situation herself. She takes a cab, and accidentally bumps her head against the window when the driver (Rosie O'Donnell) misses a red light. She wakes up in the hospital with amnesia, and believes that she is Mrs. Sheffield (which Maxwell cannot bring himself to correct). However, news about an old rival restores Fran's memory, and she blurts out that she lost Elizabeth's pearls just as Maxwell enters.
70	22	"The Hockey Show"	Dorothy Lyman	Robbie Schwartz	March 4, 1996	321	17.8
Fran starts dating Mike LaVoe, a famous hockey player for the New York Rangers. Mike is very superstitious and calls Fran his good luck charm, but when his luck suddenly changes during an important game, he blames her for wearing a pair of red heels. The entire city thinks she is a jinx and she decides to prove him wrong. But did the red shoes really jinx the game?
71	23	"That's Midlife"	Dorothy Lyman	Caryn Lucas	March 11, 1996	322	18.3
After losing to Fran in tennis, Maxwell goes through a midlife crisis including dressing younger and buying a flashy sports car. Fran finally makes him realize his life is great, and the two of them go for one last hurrah in the sports car.
72	24	"The Cantor Show"	Dorothy Lyman	Diane Wilk	April 29, 1996	323	16.9
Fran dates the new temple cantor, Gary. Upon hearing Gary sing, Maxwell casts him to be in his next play. He quickly promotes the cantor to the lead of the play after the original actor is hit by a bus, and Gary decides to quit the temple to dedicate his time to his Broadway career. The congregation members blame Fran and Sylvia for Gary's decision and shun them. Sylvia places a curse on Fran and everything starts to backfire until Fran donates the $500 she received from the airline to the temple.
73	25	"Green Card"	Dorothy Lyman	Story by : Jean Ford; Teleplay by : Rick Shaw	May 6, 1996	324	15.6
When Brighton fails French, Maxwell hires a handsome Frenchman named Philippe as a private tutor. Fran wastes no time in flirting with Philippe and he quickly proposes to her, but Maxwell suspects he is only after a green card. Fran refuses to listen to him, until she discovers Philippe has made a pass at C.C. and only proposed to her to stay in the country. She dumps him and Maxwell takes Fran to dinner to console her.
74	26	"Ship of Fran's"	Dorothy Lyman	Diane Wilk	May 13, 1996	326	17.4
Fran decides to go on a cruise to meet men with Val, but Maxwell quickly changes her plans and books the entire family (his and hers) aboard the ship. While Niles and C.C. fight over who has to share a cabin with Yetta, Fran is excited to meet the single man a psychic predicted was in her future. Sylvia introduces her to Steve, a fantastic man who is arrested as a stowaway just as the mambo contest begins. Maxwell then steps in as her partner and Fran dances on water with the man of her dreams—even if she does not realize it. Meanwhile, Niles discovers that C.C. is his "Lady Luck" and must do favors for her to accompany him to the ship's casino.
75	27	"A Pup in Paris"	Dorothy Lyman	Diane Wilk	May 20, 1996	325	15.1
Maxwell is off to Paris. His mother wants him to talk to his brother Nigel, who is spending his trust fund on a nightclub. He mistakenly takes the pet carrier holding Chester instead of his own luggage when he leaves for Paris, and Fran follows him onto the plane to trade bags. She becomes trapped in a storage area on the plane and emerges to spend the trip with Maxwell in Paris. They shop and tour around the city, after Maxwell has a horrible quarrel with Nigel. Eventually, he realizes all he wants is to be like Nigel and quickly returns to New York. The plane experiences heavy turbulence, and fearing disaster, Maxwell opens his heart and tells Fran he loves her.
