= The Nanny season 1 =

The Nanny
- Season 1
- DVD cover
- No. of episodes: 22

Release
- Original network: CBS
- Original release: November 3, 1993 – May 16, 1994

Season chronology
- Next → Season 2

The first season of the American television sitcom The Nanny aired on CBS from November 3, 1993, to May 16, 1994. The series was created by actress Fran Drescher and her then-husband Peter Marc Jacobson, and developed by Prudence Fraser and Robert Sternin. Produced by Sternin and Fraser Ink Inc. and TriStar Television, the series features Drescher, Jacobson, Fraser, Sternin, Caryn Lucas and Diane Wilk as executive producers. Most of the season's episodes aired on Wednesdays at 8:30 pm while the first few aired on Wednesdays at 8:00 pm.

Based on an idea inspired by Drescher's visit with a friend and The Sound of Music, the series revolves around Fran Fine, a Jewish woman from Flushing, Queens, New York, who is hired by a wealthy Broadway producer to be the nanny to his three children. Drescher stars as the titular character, Charles Shaughnessy as British-born producer Maxwell Sheffield, and the children – Maggie, Brighton and Grace – portrayed by Nicholle Tom, Benjamin Salisbury, and Madeline Zima. The series also features Daniel Davis as Niles, the family butler, and Lauren Lane as C.C. Babcock, Maxwell's associate in his production company who is smitten with him. Several recurring characters also played a role in the sitcom's plotlines, many of whom were related to Fran.

The Nanny's first season debuted to moderate numbers and ratings for the channel, maintaining most of the initial audience through the season's broadcast. The season finale, however, generated a large increase in ratings, garnering the second highest rating for season behind the fifth episode "Here Comes the Brood", with 20.3 million viewers. The season was released on DVD by Sony Pictures Home Entertainment in 2005, nearly 12 years after its premiere.

== Production ==
=== Concept ===
The concept for The Nanny came into fruition during Drescher's trip to France and the United Kingdom. In France, Drescher lived with a family and observed the family's life with a Guatemalan nanny. After leaving France, Drescher left for the United Kingdom to visit close friend, model and former Princesses co-star Twiggy. While there, Drescher spent time with Twiggy and her husband Leigh Lawson's children. Drescher noted how she felt out of place in the country: "Everything was so English, so proper. I felt like this loud New Yorker, so crude, so blue collar, so Jewish." Drescher called her husband, producer Peter Marc Jacobson, and told him her idea of "a takeoff of The Sound of Music, only I come through the door instead of Julie Andrews."

=== Development ===
Drescher had previously starred in the television sitcom Princesses on CBS in 1991. The series, spearheaded by Jeff Sagansky, was plagued with rumors of behind-the-scenes drama. The series' launch underperformed and after only five episodes amidst declining ratings, CBS canceled the show. Drescher met up with Sagansky during her flight to France and arranged for her and Jacobson to pitch an idea for CBS. After her trip to France and visit with Twiggy, Drescher told her idea to her husband, who stated "That's an idea that will sell." Four months later, the series was put into pre-production with Drescher and Jacobson signed on as writers and executive producers.

In January 1994, the season received a full-season pickup.

== Cast and characters ==
=== Main ===
- Fran Drescher as Fran Fine
- Charles Shaughnessy as Maxwell Sheffield
- Daniel Davis as Niles
- Lauren Lane as Chastity Claire "C.C" Babcock
- Nicholle Tom as Maggie Sheffield
- Benjamin Salisbury as Brighton Sheffield
- Madeline Zima as Grace Sheffield

=== Recurring ===
- Renée Taylor as Sylvia Fine
- Rachel Chagall as Val Toriello
- Ann Morgan Guilbert as Yetta Rosenberg

=== Special guest stars ===
- Carol Channing as herself
- Cloris Leachman as Clara Mueller
- Lesley-Anne Down as Chloe Simpson
- Twiggy as Jocelyn Sheffield
- Leigh Lawson as Lester
- Dan Aykroyd as Repair Man
- Rita Moreno as Mrs. Wickervich Stone
- Robert Culp as Stewart Babcock
- Patti LaBelle as herself

=== Guest stars ===
- Jonathan Penner as Danny Imperialli
- Jimmy Marsden as Eddie
- Dorothy Lyman as Maureen Wentworth
- Nikki Cox as Cindy Wentworth
- Nancy Frangione as Marsha Rosenberg
- Ian Abercrombie as Butler Inspector #1
- Brian George as Butler Inspector #2
- Zack Norman as Jack Rosenberg
- Cristine Rose as Dr. Bort
- Allan Rich as Pauly the pawnbroker
- Stephen Nichols as Brock Storm
- Matt McCoy as Steve Mintz
- Maree Cheatham as Emma Trusdale
- Marianne Muellerleile as Andrea's mother
- Tina Hart as Andrea
- Anthony Cistaro as Carlo
- Andy Dick as Pepé / Bernie
- Louis Guss as Irving Koenig
- Jackie Tohn as Tiffany Koenig
- Doug Ballard as Doctor Link
- Francesca P. Roberts as Nurse Smith
- Gregg Rogell as Kenny Keroucan
- Lane Davies as Nigel, Duke of Salisbury
- Eric Braeden as Frank Bradley
- Miko Hughes as Frank Bradley Jr.
- Leann Hunley as Bobbi Jo
- Miriam Flynn as country club manager

== Episodes ==
No. overall	No. in season	Title	Directed by	Written by	Original release date	Prod. code	U.S. viewers (millions)
1	1	"The Nanny"	Lee Shallat	Story by : Peter Marc Jacobson & Fran Drescher; Teleplay by : Peter Marc Jacobson & Robert Sternin & Prudence Fraser	November 3, 1993	101	15.0
Fran Fine, newly single and recently fired from her previous job, goes door to door selling cosmetics when she rings the doorbell of Maxwell Sheffield, a wealthy widowed producer, and is misconstrued as applying for the job as his children's nanny. Despite his initial reluctance, Maxwell hires Fran on a trial basis. She oversteps her boundaries when she brings the children to an important event but avoids peril when the strategy proves beneficial to Maxwell's business. Maggie, the oldest of the children, is caught kissing a boy and when Fran steps in to defend the kiss, Maxwell fires her. Realizing the error in judgment, Maxwell rehires Fran on the basis that they respect each other's boundaries.
2	2	"Smoke Gets in Your Lies"	Lee Shallat	Michael Rowe	November 10, 1993	103	11.6
Brighton hears a story from Fran about a bad boy in her class who smoked cigarettes and decides to try it. He gets caught and uses Fran's story as leverage. When the truth is exposed, Brighton covers for Fran, who later confesses to Maxwell where the idea of smoking came from. She and Maxwell then devise a strategy to punish Brighton and convince him not to continue smoking, using Grandma Yetta as a medium.
3	3	"My Fair Nanny"	Lee Shallat	Andy Goodman	November 17, 1993	108	12.7
C.C. proposes to enroll Maggie into the debutante society, an idea to which Maggie objects. Fran then takes it upon herself to plan a High Society Tea for mothers and daughters, but C.C. fears that Fran's demeanor will ruin the party. Scared that she will embarrass Maggie, Fran seeks Maxwell and Niles' tutelage on how to be a socialite. At the tea, Fran manages to impress the ladies but upsets Maggie in the process.
4	4	"The Nuchslep"	Lee Shallat	Eve Ahlert & Dennis Drake	November 24, 1993	102	11.5
Maggie gets asked out by Eddie, the boy she had her first kiss with at the backer's party. Fran convinces Maxwell to let Maggie go on her date, provided that she serves as Maggie's chaperone, or "nuchslep". Maggie struggles to get a word in during the date while Fran has no problem keeping the conversation going. When Eddie calls the next day asking for Fran, Maggie gets jealous and accuses her of stealing her boyfriend. Fran realizes that she needs to serve as Maggie's friend as opposed to her nanny, and decides to end things with Eddie, only to discover he does like Maggie and just wanted to get his resume to Maxwell through Fran.
5	5	"Here Comes the Brood"	Lee Shallat	Diane Wilk	December 6, 1993	104	20.3
C.C., jealous of Fran's increasing presence in Sheffield's life, asks to accompany Maxwell on the family trip to the zoo to spend more time with the children. On the day of the trip, however, Maxwell experiences a toothache and visits Fran's dentist uncle. Fran, who is on her day off, suggests that C.C. take the kids by herself. After being irritated by the children during the trip, C.C. remarks that Fran only spends time with them because she is paid to do so, which Grace takes badly. She runs away to Fran, who takes her to her cousin's wedding while alerting Maxwell and C.C. of the situation. After finding out that it was C.C. who told Gracie what she did, both Fran and Maxwell berate Miss Babcock for what she said, and Fran explains to Gracie that although she is paid to take care of her, she really loves her. Fran then threatens C.C. if she ever hurts the kids again, and as punishment, forces her to watch her young cousin's horrible tap-dancing routine over and over.
6	6	"The Butler, The Husband, The Wife, and Her Mother"	Lee Shallat	Howard Meyers	December 8, 1993	107	13.7
Sylvia tells her brother-in-law (Zack Norman) and his daughter (Nancy Frangione) that Fran married Maxwell and invites them over to the Sheffield house while the family is at the museum to celebrate Brighton's class presidential victory. Fran joins in on the ruse and brings Niles in on it. The situation becomes complicated when representatives from the Butlers Association come by to check Niles for evaluation and compounded even further when Maxwell and the kids return from the museum. Maxwell, at Fran and Niles' behest, plays along as Niles but fails to maintain character when he learns that Brighton lost the race for class president. Fran comes clean to Jack and Marsha, who initially mock her, only to be defended by the children and even Sylvia. When C.C. arrives, she inadvertently exposes the truth about Niles, but when Fran points out the family was willing to go to great lengths to cover for him, the Association decides to induct him.
7	7	"Imaginary Friend"	Lee Shallat	Pamela Eells & Sally Lapiduss	December 15, 1993	106	11.9
Grace's imaginary friend Imogene begins to annoy the family, but Fran insists that they support her. However, things take a turn for the worse when Grace and Fran are baking cookies, only for Grace to accuse the nanny of eating and killing Imogene. The family holds a mock funeral as a way for her to deal with the death. After a session with Grace's psychiatrist (Cristine Rose), Maxwell and Fran learn that Imogene came around the time that Grace lost her mother. Grace admits that she grew tired of Imogene because she has a new friend to take care of her, Fran.
8	8	"Christmas Episode"	Lee Shallat	Fran Drescher & Peter Marc Jacobson	December 22, 1993	109	14.6
Fran goes on a Christmas shopping spree, believing that she will receive a major bonus for the holidays. Meanwhile, Grace wallows as her father is about to miss another Christmas with the family. When Fran receives a vase as her bonus, she is forced to pawn some belongings to make her payments. However, when she discovers the meaning behind the vase, Fran buys it back with her grandmother's watch. Niles tells Maxwell about Fran's dilemma, which he solves by buying back the watch. He then sits on the vase and lands in the hospital, staying overnight for Christmas and granting Grace her Christmas present.
9	9	"Personal Business"	Lee Shallat	Fran Drescher & Peter Marc Jacobson	December 29, 1993	105	14.8
Maxwell and C.C. court Brock Storm, a popular soap opera star, for their new production, but he will only agree to do the show if they set him up with Fran. Maxwell, initially setting a standard for Fran's personal and business affairs, asks Fran to be Brock's date and expresses doubts about the arrangement. Despite being ecstatic about dating her favorite soap opera star, Fran questions whether it toes the line between business and personal. She goes on her date only to find Brock vain and unoriginal.
10	10	"The Nanny-in-Law"	Paul Miller	Eve Ahlert & Dennis Drake	January 12, 1994	110	14.3
Maxwell's childhood nanny Clara Mueller (Cloris Leachman) comes for a visit and begins taking over the Sheffield household, irritating Fran. She critiques her parenting style and her demeanor while quashing Brighton's jokes and condemning Maggie's makeup. When she goes too far and causes Fran to make a dramatic change, Maxwell realizes that Clara has overstayed her welcome. Fran confronts Clara and later gets her a job working as C.C.'s mother's caretaker. Meanwhile, Niles and Clara engage in an intense fling.
11	11	"A Plot for Nanny"	Paul Miller	Sandy Krinski & Lisa Garrett	January 19, 1994	111	16.5
Sylvia uses her birthday gift to Fran to arrange a meeting between her and an undertaker, Steve. Despite the initial awkwardness, the two begin bonding and connecting after their first date. Maxwell and Brighton grow concerned with Fran's blossoming relationship, worrying that she might leave them if the relationship goes any further. Fran chooses to break it off when Steve reveals his desire to become a clown. Meanwhile, Maggie begins dating a boy in her class.
12	12	"The Show Must Go On"	Will Mackenzie	Frank Lombardi & Dana Reston	January 26, 1994	112	11.2
Fran is made the director of Grace's school pageant and makes Grace the lead. Maxwell, concerned for Grace's well-being, takes over the play, much to the headmistress' delight while leaving Fran feeling left out. Grace, feeling pressure from her father, becomes scared and decides not to perform on opening night. Maxwell begs Fran to help, admitting that he was too hard on Grace; Fran then talks with the youngest Sheffield, and helps her overcome her fears.
13	13	"Maggie the Model"	Will Mackenzie	Diane Wilk	February 2, 1994	115	13.7
Maxwell's former flame and Fran's favorite model, Chloe Simpson, comes for a visit and takes a liking to Maggie. She recruits her as a model, prompting Fran to give Maggie pointers. Maxwell, while initially reluctant to let Maggie model, relents as he continues to fawn over Chloe. When Chloe interjects, Fran becomes jealous of her. The photos from Maggie's photoshoot do not turn out well, upsetting Maggie. Meanwhile, C.C. feels abandoned by Maxwell, who is still smitten with Chloe.
14	14	"The Family Plumbing"	Linda Day	Bill Lawrence	February 9, 1994	113	16.0
Maxwell hires Fran's uncle to fix the plumbing at the house, but the job takes longer than expected. Fran tries to convince Maxwell to let Maggie go to her first boy–girl party. The problem is compounded when dozens of beautiful women arrive at the house to audition for a dancing role in Maxwell's latest play. Fran's cousin Tiffany, who accompanies her uncle, kisses Brighton in the shower. Maxwell rejoices upon learning this, forcing Fran to challenge his double standard and get Maggie permission to attend the party.
15	15	"Deep Throat"	Linda Day	Pamela Eells & Sally Lapiduss	March 2, 1994	114	11.5
Fran takes Grace to the doctor and, during the visit, is told to have her tonsils removed. Meanwhile, C.C. is going to her sorority reunion and asks Maxwell to be her escort. Fran is about to undergo surgery when Maxwell offers to stay behind and support her, forcing C.C. to go to her reunion alone. At the hospital, while under medication, Fran tells Maxwell that she loves him, leaving him bewildered. However, after her operation, it is revealed that she says this to every man around her under the influence of drugs, much to Niles' amusement.
16	16	"Schlepped Away"	Linda Day	Fran Drescher & Peter Marc Jacobson	March 9, 1994	116	12.7
Fran, C.C., and the Sheffields head for the airport during a snowstorm but get lost when taking a shortcut. They stop at Sylvia's apartment, where they learn that the airports and roads are closed. They decide to make the most out of their time thereby having their own "vacation," which involves eating tongue and watching Wheel of Fortune. Later that night, Fran discovers her mother might be having an affair when she finds a love note in the meat. She confronts Sylvia about the note, which turns out to be innocent flirting between her and the butcher.
17	17	"Stop the Wedding, I Want to Get Off"	Gail Mancuso	Diane Wilk	March 16, 1994	117	9.7
Maxwell's sister Jocelyn (Twiggy) comes for a visit and announces that she is engaged to Nigel (Lane Davies). Fran offers the Sheffield residence as a wedding venue and plans their wedding, but soon learns that Jocelyn may have unrequited feelings for her chauffeur Lester (Leigh Lawson). She tries telling Maxwell only for the message to fall on deaf ears. Fran then tells Lester to express his love to Jocelyn, which he does as the wedding is commencing. Jocelyn ends her engagement with Nigel and marries Lester. Meanwhile, Kenny avoids Maggie after seeing the lifestyle she lives.
18	18	"Sunday in the Park with Fran"	Gail Mancuso	Howard Meyers	March 23, 1994	118	11.3
Maxwell and C.C. scheme to get a positive review for their latest play from notorious critic Frank Bradley, and C.C. suggests that Grace and his son, Frank Jr., go on a play date together, despite Grace saying she dislikes him. Fran supervises the two on a trip to the park but ends up hitting Frank Jr. with a baguette when the spoiled brat bullies Grace. Maxwell and C.C. try to defuse the situation by inviting Frank himself over, but when the critic proves to be even more abusive to Fran than his son, Maxwell tells him off and kicks him out of the house. Luckily, Frank comes down with food poisoning (caused by the Sheffields' broken refrigerator) on the opening night of the show, prompting a television news team to ask an audience member's opinion--and that audience member turns out to be Fran, who gives the play a glowing review and ensures its success. Maxwell and Fran share their first kiss after the play is declared a hit.
19	19	"Gym Teacher"	Gail Mancuso	Alan Eisenstock & Larry Mintz	April 6, 1994	119	12.5
Maggie skips out on gym class to avoid her tough teacher using Fran's advice: fake medical notes. When she is caught, Fran steps in to defuse the situation, only to find that Maggie's gym teacher Mrs. Wickervich (Rita Moreno) is the same teacher that Fran had in high school. Fran is able to arrange for a final physical test for Maggie, and helps her train; though both fail miserably, Fran performs the Heimlich maneuver on Mrs. Wickervich and uses the good deed as leverage to get Maggie an A. Meanwhile, Maxwell also deals with a demon from his past when he hires a famous stage actor who he used to work for; with some help from Fran, he is eventually able to rein the actor in.
20	20	"Ode to Barbra Joan"	Gail Mancuso	Story by : David M. Matthews; Teleplay by : Frank Lombardi & Dana Reston	April 13, 1994	120	9.9
C.C.'s father Stewart comes for a visit and surprises everyone by being the polar opposite of his daughter. At dinner, Stewart reveals that he will be attending a Barbra Streisand concert while in town, and invites C.C., who turns him down; an ecstatic Fran offers to go instead. Stewart and Fran begin spending a great deal of time together, which upsets C.C., though she refuses to admit it. Fran realizes C.C.'s troubles and encourages her to open up about her feelings; this reunites the Babcocks, and they go to the concert together (though Stewart arranges for Barbra to talk with Fran on the phone as thanks for her help). Meanwhile, Maxwell is invited to speak at a theatre symposium on the same day he promised to take Brighton to a Mets game. Inspired by Fran's example, he breaks the engagement to spend time with his son, only to discover that Brighton already made other plans.
21	21	"Frannie's Choice"	Paul Miller	Tracy Newman & Jonathan Stark	April 20, 1994	121	9.9
Fran visits Danny at the bridal shop after learning he broke up with Heather Biblow. Danny asks her to forgive him and take him back, but Fran doesn't want to repeat her sad history. Danny, determined to prove that he is a different man, proposes. Fran says yes after a talk with her mother. She tells the Sheffields of her engagement, leaving the children and Niles unhappy and C.C. overjoyed. As she moves her stuff out of the mansion, the family says their goodbyes until they reveal how much they will miss her, causing Fran to pull back from the engagement.
22	22	"I Don't Remember Mama"	Paul Miller	Howard Meyers & Diane Wilk	May 16, 1994	122	19.1
With Mother's Day approaching, Maxwell arranges for the entire family to join a country club to deflect attention away from their late mother, Sara. Fran and Grace enter a mother-daughter pageant. During rehearsal for the pageant, a competitive mother alerts the heads of the pageant that Fran is not Grace's mother, causing Grace to break down and cry that her mother is dead. Fran and Maxwell comfort her and learn that the real problem is that Grace does not remember her mother. Fran and Grace perform in the pageant and get second place. Patti LaBelle performs in the pageant. The whole family then watches home movies featuring Sara as a true Mother's Day celebration, during which Grace remembers a moment with her mother.

== Home media ==
The Nanny: The Complete First Season
Set Details		Special Features
22 Episodes; 3-Disc Set; English Stereo Sound; Subtitles in French, Spanish, and Portuguese; Audio Commentaries		Audio Commentary from Fran Drescher; "The Making of The Nanny"
Release Dates
Region 1
July 12, 2005	July 19, 2005	July 13, 2005
