= The Nanny (The Nanny episode) =

- The Nanny episode
- Episode no.: Season 1 Episode 1
- Directed by: Lee Shallat-Chemel
- Written by: Prudence Fraser, Fran Drescher, Peter Marc Jacobson, Robert Sternin, Peter Marc Jacobson
- Production code: 101
- Original air date: November 3, 1993
- Running time: 30 minutes

Guest appearances
- Jonathan Penner as Danny Imperiali; James Marsden as Eddie; Ray Johnson as Piano Player; Curtis Hood as Investor Man; Dee Dee Rescher as Dottie

Episode chronology
← Previous —	Next → "Smoke Gets In Your Lies"
- The Nanny season 1

"The Nanny" is the self-titled pilot episode of the American television sitcom The Nanny. It was filmed in 1993 at Culver Studios on 9336 W. Washington Blvd. in Culver City, California. The pilot aired on CBS on November 3, 1993. Picked up by CBS shortly after, the show would go on to produce 145 more episodes, ending its successful primetime run in 1999.

== Cast and characters ==
Actor	Character
Fran Drescher	Fran Fine
Renée Taylor	Sylvia Fine
Charles Shaughnessy	Maxwell Sheffield
Lauren Lane	C.C. Babcock
Daniel Davis	Niles
Nicholle Tom	Margaret Sheffield
Benjamin Salisbury	Brighton Sheffield
Madeline Zima	Grace Sheffield
Rachel Chagall	Val Toriello

== Plot outline ==
After loud-mouthed Fran Fine is jilted by Danny Imperialli, her husband-to-be and boss, she makes money by selling cosmetics door-to-door. One door happens to belong to Maxwell Sheffield, a Broadway producer who happens to need a nanny for his three children. Fran jumps at the chance. Hardly impressing Mr. Sheffield or his particularly obnoxious, smart-mouthed son Brighton, it seems the only one who enjoys Fran is Niles, the butler. Mr. Sheffield is still considering Fran until she proves to be too far beneath his class, writing her resume in red lipstick and answering the home phone for him. Just as Fran is about to leave, Mr. Sheffield hears that the nanny agency won't be able to send a nanny to the Sheffield home until after that weekend. At this night, Mr. Sheffield reluctantly hires Fran to take care of his children.

In the morning, Fran again fails to impress when she comes to breakfast in a bathrobe and slippers, while everyone else is fully dressed and prepared for their day. Fran hears about a backer's party Mr. Sheffield is hosting to fundraise for his production, and is excited to go along with the children—until they inform her that they, along with the nanny, are not invited. Fran ignores this and takes the kids to Danny's bridal shop where we meet Val, Fran's best friend. Fran states that she has a lot of work to do with the kids: Brighton's attitude, Gracie's mental health, and Maggie's lack of personality.

That evening, Fran, dressed in a loud, shimmering red dress in contrast to the other guests' drab colors, comes downstairs to join the party. She meets C.C. Babcock, Mr. Sheffield's business associate, who is not at all impressed with the new nanny. Mr. Sheffield, informing her that she and the children are not invited, quickly tries to usher her back upstairs—but not before the children come down, all dressed up and ready to join the festivities. Mr. Sheffield, surprised at how much Maggie "looks like her mother" when she is all dolled up, reluctantly agrees to allow them and Fran to stay. Their presence proves to be a hit with the guests and the party is a success, garnering Sheffield Productions multiple five-figure checks.

Mr. Sheffield hurries to his office to put away the final check of the evening, where he finds Maggie out on the balcony, engaging in her first kiss with one of the waiters from the party. Shocked and upset, Mr. Sheffield yells at them both and the waiter hurries out of the house, leaving Maggie in tears. Mr. Sheffield grounds her and sends her upstairs, angering Fran who states that Maggie should be excited about what is a very memorable evening, instead of crying. An argument between the two ensues and ends with Fran being fired.

Back at her mother's home, Fran is surprised to find Mr. Sheffield at the door, having been influenced by Niles to get Fran back. Mr. Sheffield proposes that they try and respect each other's differences before offering to give it another go. Fran, realizing that she is being re-hired, excitedly tells her mother of the news, who just-as-excitedly gets the camera ready as Fran jumps up and hugs the surprised Mr. Sheffield for a candid shot.

== Additional notes ==
- An original bridal shop scene was filmed but reshot months later because it didn't fully explain the breakup between Fran Fine and Danny Imperalli. Also an additional scene (before Fran arrives at the Sheffield Mansion) that introduces Maxwell Sheffield, C. C. Babcock and Niles the Butler was filmed, but excluded in the final product.
- An original low-budget opening credits was shot featuring the song "If My Friends Could See Me Now", performed by Gwen Verdon from the 1966 Broadway musical Sweet Charity, and involved featured Fran against a white background getting ready to go to work as the nanny.
- Most of the set designs in this episode were different than the ones used for the rest of the series.

=== COVID-19 Table read ===
- On 6 April 2020, the cast all reunited and isolated from their homes, performing a table read of the pilot episode and it aired on YouTube, produced by Sony Pictures Entertainment.

== See also ==
- List of The Nanny episodes
