= My Fair Nanny =

My Fair Nanny may refer to:

- "My Fair Nanny", a 1993 episode of American sitcom The Nanny
- My Fair Nanny (TV series), a Russian sitcom based on the American series
