= Princesses (TV series) =

- Cast photo
- Genre: Sitcom
- Created by: Barry Kemp; Mark Ganzel; Robin Schiff
- Directed by: Lee Shallat-Chemel
- Starring: Julie Hagerty; Fran Drescher; Twiggy
- Opening theme: "Someday My Prince Will Come", performed by The Roches
- Composer: J. A. C. Redford
- Country of origin: United States
- Original language: English
- No. of seasons: 1
- No. of episodes: 8 (3 unaired) (list of episodes)

Production
- Executive producers: John Bowman; Jay Kleckner; Barry Kemp
- Camera setup: Multi-camera
- Running time: 30 minutes
- Production companies: Bungalow 78 Productions; Universal Television

Original release
- Network: CBS
- Release: September 27 – October 25, 1991

Princesses is an American television sitcom that aired on CBS from September 27 to October 25, 1991. The series was produced by Universal Television and lasted five episodes. The series theme song, "Someday My Prince Will Come" (from Disney's animated film Snow White and the Seven Dwarfs), was performed by The Roches.

== Synopsis ==
The series chronicles the lives of three female roommates in New York City, each with a different background and upbringing, thus the series' title: Tracy Dillon (Julie Hagerty), a ditzy English teacher who dumps her fiancé after learning about his previous two marriages; Tracy's longtime best friend Melissa Kirshner (Fran Drescher), an outspoken Jewish-American who sells cosmetics at a department store; and Georgina "Georgy" de La Rue (Twiggy), a naive, recently widowed English princess (and whose previous occupation was that of a showgirl) who arrives in the U.S. to challenge her late husband's contested will. The idea of the three being roommates in the same apartment happened accidentally because the apartment's owner Tony promised Tracy and Georgy the use of the rent-free building without telling either one who would use it or to whom he had loaned it.

== Cast ==
- Julie Hagerty as Tracy Dillon
- Fran Drescher as Melissa Kirshner
- Twiggy as Princess Georgina "Georgy" de La Rue

=== Recurring ===
- Leila Kenzle as Debra Kleckner, Melissa's snooty sister

=== Notable guest stars ===
- James Read as Michael Decrow, Tracy's fiancé (in "Pilot")
- Leann Hunley as Andrea Sussman, Mike's business partner and ex-wife (in "Pilot")
- Peter Hobbs as the Reverend (in "Pilot")
- Bradford Tatum as Mike, Tracy's student (in "Luv Leddahs")
- Richard Kind as Dr. Len Kleckner, Melissa's dentist brother-in-law (in "My Prince Will Gum")
- William Daniels as Harrison Fadiman (in "The Snob Who Came to Dinner")
- Charles Dennis as Charles Hawkenberry (in "The Snob Who Came to Dinner")
- Rod Loomis as Edward (in "Tall, Dark, and Hansom")

== Production and cancellation ==
Before the show's premiere, entertainment media outlets such as Entertainment Tonight began publicizing the show's behind-the-scenes woes. In an effort to downplay the behind-the-scenes turmoil on Princesses, CBS execs initially touted the series as "promising" to advertisers. However, upon its premiere, Princesses received negative reviews and placed last in the Nielsen ratings for its timeslot.

On October 14, Universal Television and Hagerty announced that Hagerty had departed the series in a mutual decision. While producers were planning to create a storyline to write out and replace Hagerty's character, CBS cancelled the series and pulled it from the air.

Following the series cancellation, Drescher and Twiggy remained good friends as the latter returned to England. While going to visit Twiggy in England, Drescher accidentally ran into CBS programming head Jeff Sagansky on her flight, and he gave Drescher a chance to pitch her own series. While visiting Twiggy, Drescher came up with the idea of what became The Nanny.

== Episodes ==
No.	Title	Directed by	Written by	Original release date	Prod. code
1	"Pilot"	Lee Shallat-Chemel	Mark Ganzel & Robin Schiff	September 27, 1991	83563
After a six-week relationship, English teacher Tracy Dillon prepares to marry businessman Mike Decrow. While he secures the two a sublet for a penthouse from a friend, they discover Princess Georgina de La Rue has also been sublet the apartment due to her being left penniless amidst a lawsuit from her late husband's children. After discovering Mike has hidden two ex-wives from her – one of them being his business partner – Tracy breaks off the engagement, agreeing to share the penthouse with Georgy and inviting her best friend Melissa.
2	"Her Highness for Hire"	Lee Shallat-Chemel	Sally Lapiduss & Pamela Eells	October 4, 1991	67602
Needing some money to pay off debts, Georgy decides to return to her roots as a showgirl for financial support.
3	"Luv Leddahs"	Lee Shallat-Chemel	Marion Grodin	October 11, 1991	67606
Tracy becomes intrigued by a student's written essay, which reads more like a love letter than an assignment. But when Melissa and Georgy encourage her to write one back, it ends up backfiring as she becomes embroiled in the student's marriage.
4	"My Prince Will Gum"	Lee Shallat-Chemel	John Bowman	October 18, 1991	67603
Melissa is reluctant to attend the "Periodontist's Ball" so her snooty sister can set her up with her husband's new associate. Melissa decides to see her date for herself by pretending to be a patient, but discovers her prince of a brother-in-law may be too charming with his hygienist.
5	"Georgy Sings the Blues"	Lee Shallat-Chemel	Mark Ganzel & Robin Schiff	October 25, 1991	67607
Georgy hopes to come to the rescue by tracking down a suicidal talent agent, whom she lets in to the apartment as a way to get him to see her showbiz talents. Meanwhile, Tracy passes up a chance to go on a blind date with a person much shorter than her.
6	"The Snob Who Came to Dinner"	Lee Shallat-Chemel	Mark Ganzel & Robin Schiff	Unaired	67601
Melissa and Tracy use Georgy to throw a party in an attempt to meet eligible bachelors in the building. However, all they get is a snooty columnist (William Daniels) with a habit of chasing people away – but captures Tracy's attention.
7	"Showuhs in Yonkuhs Fall Mainly on Flowuhs"	Lee Shallat-Chemel	John Bowman	Unaired	67608
Melissa turns to Georgy for speech lessons in an effort to impress a Greek tycoon.
8	"Tall, Dark and Hansome"	Lee Shallat-Chemel	Robin Schiff & Mark Ganzell	Unaired	67610
Tracy and Melissa take Georgy out for a night on the town to help her move on from her late husband.

== Reception ==
The show received negative reviews. It ranked 118th out of 132 shows that season, averaging a 6.3 household rating.
