= Skum Rocks! =

- Directed by: Clay Westervelt
- Written by: Hart Baur; Clay Westervelt
- Produced by: Hart Baur; Clay Westervelt
- Starring: Kevin Bacon; Matthew Broderick; Fran Drescher; Ron Jeremy
- Narrated by: Alice Cooper
- Release date: September 26, 2013
- Running time: 77 minutes
- Country: United States
- Language: English

Skum Rocks! is a 2013 independent rockumentary film about Skum, a 1980s rock band with "a near-crippling lack of musical talent." The film is directed by Clay Westervelt, a veteran documentary filmmaker, and features the living members of Skum along with various celebrities commenting on the band. The film is dedicated to Jerry Mann, a former bassist for Skum who died in 2011.

== Background ==
Skum was formed in early 1984 by a group of students at the College of William & Mary. The founding members, Hart Baur, Todd, and Scott Bell, were all on the men's soccer team at William & Mary. Their initial performance consisted of cover versions of contemporary rock songs played at a local Williamsburg bar. None of the initial members of the band had any background in music, though they soon recruited Jon Tarrant, who had studied at the Royal Academy of Music. The band members considered their own music to be of poor quality, but persisted in playing for their own enjoyment. Skum sabotaged some of their own gigs rather than have their lack of talent exposed. For example, they distributed beer at an early show and then called the police, who broke up the gathering before the conclusion of their first song; later, they quit a battle of the bands due to the venue's supposedly poor sound quality.

The band used an improvised road crew by offering beer to homeless people in Williamsburg.

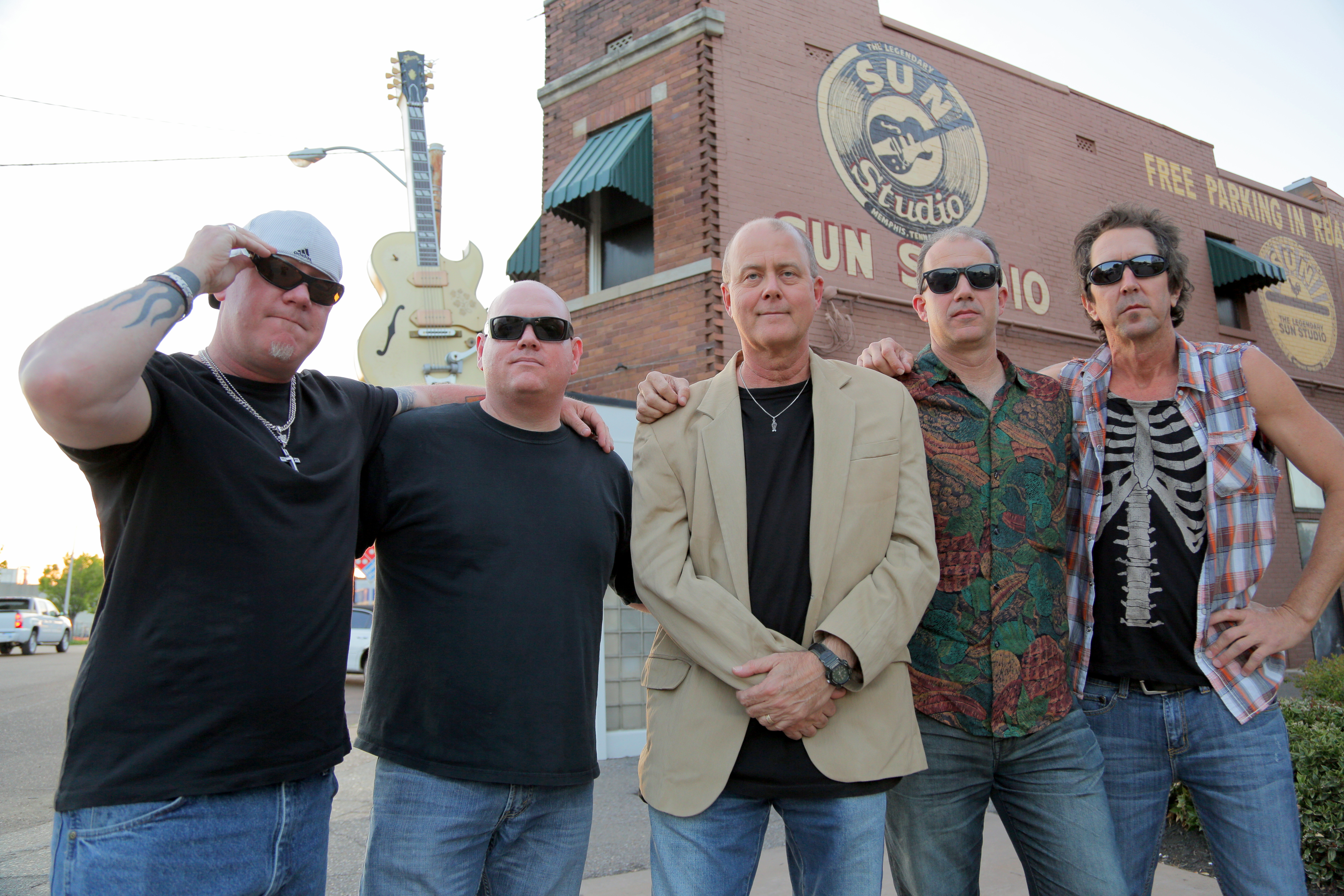
Skum Records at Sun Studios in Memphis TN April 2013

Despite these beginnings, Skum relocated to the Miami area, the home town of Baur, after some its members graduated. The band had a brief life in Miami but split up after the recordings of Lost at the Circus, their debut album, were lost.

== Description ==
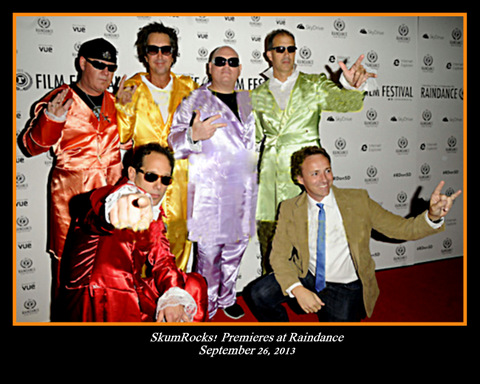
Skum Rocks! premieres at Raindance Film Festival September 2013

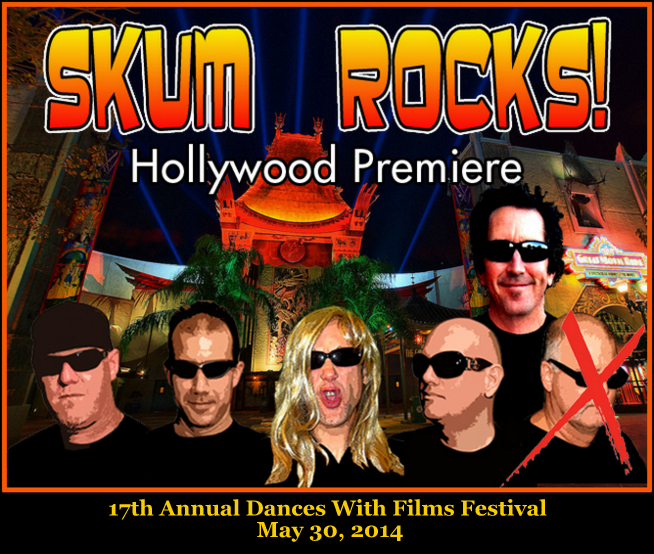
Skum Rocks! premieres in Hollywood at Dances With Films Festival in May 2014

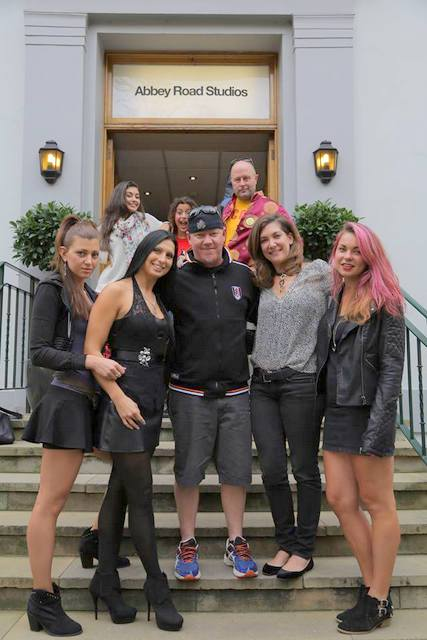
Skum Records at Abbey Road Studios in September 2013

Skum Rocks! consists of interviews with band members along with commentary from celebrities, with a format similar to that of the TV series Behind the Music. Kevin Bacon, Matthew Broderick, Fran Drescher, and Ron Jeremy were the top-billed celebrities featured; others included Steve-O, Brooke Hogan, and Phil Donahue. Jon Stewart, who was in the film, was also on the William & Mary soccer team. He graduated in 1984, whereas the original members of Skum graduated between 1985 and 1987. Skum Rocks! was partially funded by Kickstarter.

The film premiered September 26, 2013 in London, at the 2013 Raindance Film Festival. Some members of the band attended the premiere and held a question and answer session afterward. Skum Rocks! was apparently enjoyed by Manchester United players Ryan Giggs and Wayne Rooney.

Skum recorded in both Sun Studios in Memphis and Abbey Road Studios in London England for 3 tracks for 'Lost at the Circus' in 2013. This makes them the only band in the modern rock era to record in both studios during the same calendar year.

Skum Rocks! was also a selection of Dances With Films 17, and held its Hollywood premiere on May 30, 2014, at the Chinese 6 Theatres on Hollywood Boulevard. Producer Clay Westervelt of Imaginaut Entertainment was in attendance, along with Skum members Hart Baur, John Eaton, and Tommy Craig. Notable guests at the premiere were Frankie Banali, Phoenix Benjamin, Monique Parent, and Angela Dodson.

In connection with the film, a new iteration of Skum played a show on January 17, 2014, in Melbourne, Florida. The reunion show was filmed as a "final scene" for the documentary.

Skum held a benefit concert for CHARLEE of Dade County in conjunction with the Miami premiere of Skum Rocks! at the Miami Beach Colony Theatre on March 7, 2015. The afterparty benefit for CHARLEE was held at the Grand Central performance venue in Miami, and included performances by Skum, Quiet Riot, Eddie Money, and The Urge.

Among many rock journalists who followed Skum, Michael Wench of Rock World Magazine (1984–1990) wrote, "Despite a complete lack of talent and ambition . . . they owned the media and avoided playing at all costs. If I hadn't been there, I wouldn't believe it myself."

Skum's upcoming album, Lost at the Circus, was named by Inside Celebrities as one of the top ten most anticipated albums of 2015: "...a highly anticipated, wild ride eagerly awaited by Skum’s legions of die-hard fans. Including myself."

== Cast ==
Skum members

- Hart Baur – Vocals, guitar
- Todd – Bass
- Pat Burke – Lead Bass
- John Eaton – Guitar
- Tommy Gunn - Drums
- Tommy Craig - Drums

Others

- Alice Cooper as The Narrator
- Kevin Bacon as Himself
- Matthew Broderick as Himself
- Fran Drescher as Herself
- Ron Jeremy as Himself
