= Gorp (film) =

1980 film by Joseph Ruben

- Theatrical release poster
- Directed by: Joseph Ruben
- Written by: Jeffrey Konvitz; A. Martin Zweiback
- Produced by: Lou Arkoff; Jeffrey Konvitz
- Starring: Michael Lembeck; Dennis Quaid; Fran Drescher
- Cinematography: Michel Hugo
- Edited by: Bill Butler
- Music by: Paul Dunlap
- Distributed by: American International Pictures
- Release date: May 1, 1980
- Running time: 90 minutes
- Country: United States
- Languages: English; German

Gorp is a 1980 American comedy film starring Michael Lembeck and Dennis Quaid, and featuring early acting work of Rosanna Arquette and Fran Drescher in supporting roles. Directed by Joseph Ruben, with both story and screenplay by Jeffrey Konvitz and A. Martin Zweiback, the film follows in the tradition of the 1978 fraternity comedy National Lampoon's Animal House, and the 1979 summer camp comedy film Meatballs. Gorp was the penultimate film released by American International Pictures, before How to Beat the High Cost of Living two months later.

Set in a Jewish summer camp, Gorp features the kind of physical, sexual, and scatological comedy prevalent in films of this genre, while playing for comedic effect on the class distinctions between the camp's management, the camp counselors, the waiters, and the kitchen staff.

== Plot ==
A slapstick comedy about the wacky antics of a group of waiters at a Jewish summer camp in upstate New York.

== Cast ==
- Michael Lembeck as Kavell
- Dennis Quaid as "Mad" Grossman
- Fran Drescher as Evie
- Rosanna Arquette as Judy
- Philip Casnoff as Bergman
- Lisa Shure as Vicki
- David Huddleston as "Walrus" Wallman
- Robert Trebor as Rabbi Blowitz
- Lou Wagner as Federman
- Julius Harris as Fred, The Chef
