= Janis Hirsch =

American comedy writer

- Born: 1950 (age 75–76); Trenton, New Jersey
- Education: Rollins College
- Occupations: Producer, writer
- Spouse: Larry Shulman
- Children: Charlie Shulman
- Writing career
- Years active: 1983–present

Janis Hirsch (born c. 1950) is a comedy writer best known for producing and writing for television series, including Frasier, Will & Grace, My Wife and Kids, Anything But Love, LA Law, The Nanny, Til Death, Square Pegs, the National Lampoon Show, Murphy Brown, and It's Garry Shandling's Show. She has written books and for several publications including the New York Times and National Lampoon magazine.

== Biography ==
Hirsch had polio when she was 10 months old and used crutches to walk. She is Jewish and was born in Trenton, New Jersey. In 1963, when she was 13, Hirsch wrote a condolence letter to Jackie Kennedy after the assassination of John F. Kennedy. Hirsch was raised in Ewing Township, where she graduated from Ewing High School in 1968. She said she left as soon as she could, and attended and graduated from Rollins College in Winter Park, Florida. She worked for the Coconut Grove Playhouse. She then worked for burlesque dancer Ann Corio in Massachusetts as a manager.

Hirsch relocated to New York and started working for The National Lampoon Show and then for the National Lampoon magazine.

She wrote two of the first six episodes of It's Garry Shandling's Show, each of which received media praise, but she left the show soon after. In the wake of widespread 2017 media coverage of Harvey Weinstein sexual abuse allegations, Hirsch revealed that she had not left her writing position by choice. After writing two acclaimed episodes (of the first six) of It's Garry Shandling's Show, she was cut from meetings and not allowed to write any parts except for occasional single scenes with women. She stated that one day she was sitting across from Garry Shandling in his office, and one of the actors on the show unexpectedly approached her from behind and placed his flaccid penis on her shoulder. Producer Brad Grey forced Hirsch to quit from her writing position the next day, without pay.

Hirsch wrote contributions for comedy books, as well as publications like The New York Times. She once lent $300 to John Belushi to fly to an audition for Animal House in California. She moved to Los Angeles and started writing for Square Pegs.

She has produced or written for Frasier, Will & Grace, My Wife and Kids, Anything But Love, L.A. Law, The Nanny, Murphy Brown, and 'Til Death.

Hirsch has said that acceptance of women in the industry is greater now than in the 1970s when she started. She has been noted for using her clout to demand women not be ostracized or harassed on set, and she regularly mentors women in the comedy industry. Hirsch is a vocal supporter of several programs aimed at helping people with polio, Alzheimer's or disabilities. She supports Faith in America and other causes to end religious prejudice and hate towards members of the gay community. She is 2013 honoris causa initiate of the Rollins College Circle of Omicron Delta Kappa for her leadership and contributions to the arts.

She lives with her husband Larry Shulman in Los Angeles with their two dogs.
