= Peter Marc Jacobson =

Jewish American actor (born 1957)

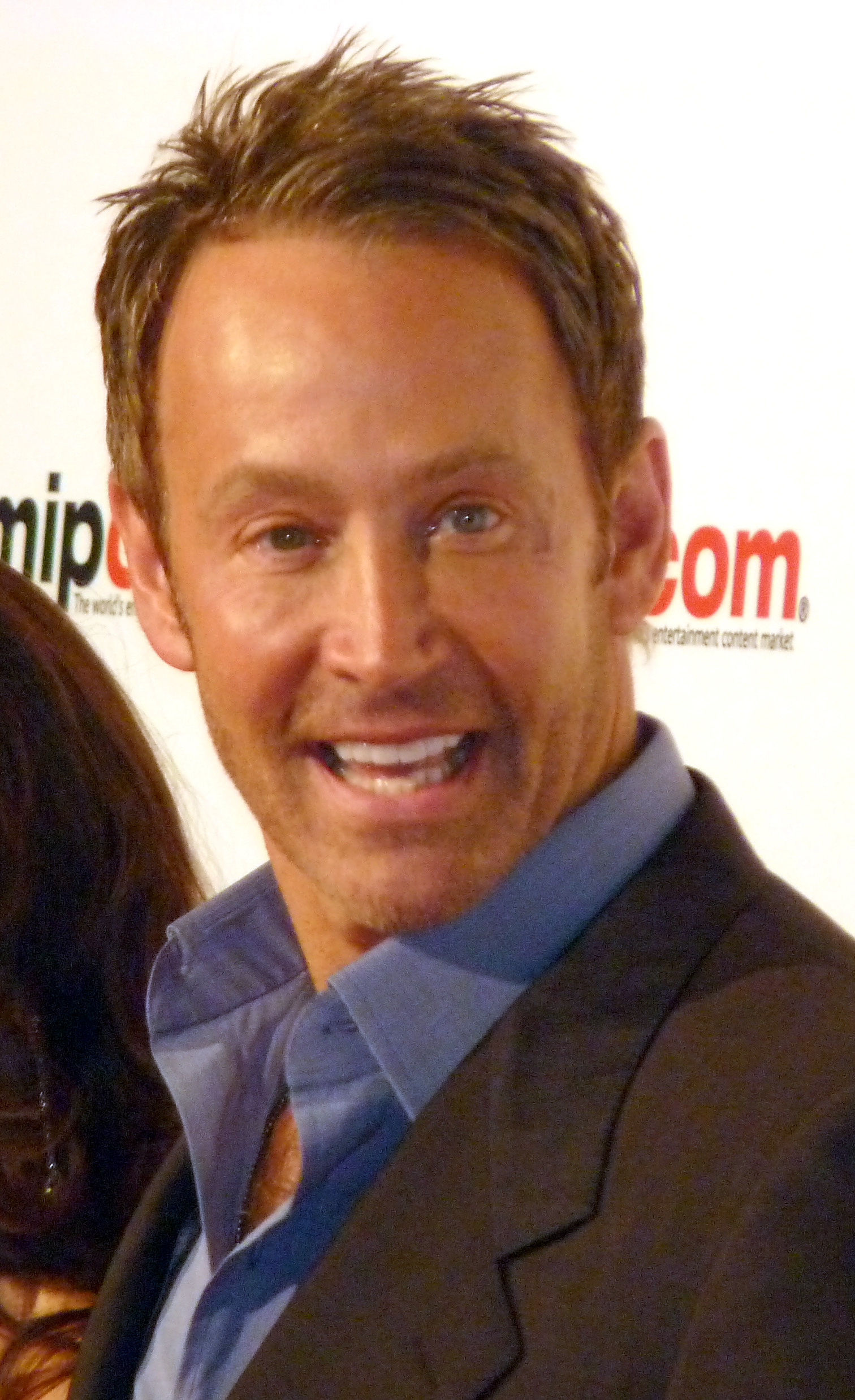
- Jacobson in Cannes, c. 2011
- Born: October 27, 1957 (age 68); New York City, U.S.
- Occupations: Writer; director; producer; actor
- Years active: 1984–present
- Spouse: Fran Drescher (m. 1978; div. 1999)

Peter Marc Jacobson (born October 27, 1957) is an American television writer, director, producer, and actor. He is best known as the executive producer of the popular sitcom The Nanny, which he created and produced with his then-wife, Fran Drescher, who also starred in the series. He was often credited as Peter Marc in his early acting roles.

== Personal life ==
Jacobson and Fran Drescher were high school sweethearts; they married in 1978 and moved to Los Angeles to launch their careers. Both are Jewish. In January 1985, two armed men broke into their Los Angeles apartment; while one ransacked their home, Drescher and a female friend were raped by the other robber at gunpoint, with Jacobson tied up and made to witness the ordeal. The perpetrator, who was on parole at the time, was returned to prison and given two life sentences.

After being separated for years, the couple, who did not have children, divorced in 1999; they have remained close friends. He came out as gay to her after their marriage ended. The couple developed the 2011 television series Happily Divorced for TV Land based on their lives.

== Production company ==
Jacobson and Fran Drescher founded their own production company, Highschool Sweethearts, in 1995. The company produced The Nanny since the show's third-season episode, "Dope Diamond". The company also produced The Beautician and the Beast with Paramount Pictures before winding down after the show's cancellation and their divorce.

== Filmography ==
=== Producer ===
- The Nanny (executive producer; 122 episodes, 1993–1999), (co-executive producer; 23 episodes, 1993–1994)
- What I Like About You (consulting producer; 18 episodes, 2004–2005), (co-executive producer; 16 episodes, 2005–2006)
- Happily Divorced (executive producer; 22 episodes, 2011–2013)

=== Writer ===
- Who's the Boss? (1984; unknown number of episodes)
- The Nanny (145 episodes, 1993–1999)
- What I Like About You (5 episodes, 2004–2006)
- Happily Divorced (10 episodes, 2011)
- Country Comfort (2 episodes, 2021)

=== Actor ===
- Wonder Woman "Spaced Out" episode (1979) – Brad (credited as Peter Marc)
- Gorp (1980) – Steinberg
- The Big Brawl (1980) – Jug
- Lunch Wagon (1981) – Jed
- Movers & Shakers (1985) – Robin
- Dangerous Love (1988) – Jay
- Booker (1990, TV Series) – Paul
- Murphy Brown (1990, TV Series) – Nick
- We're Talkin' Serious Money (1992) – Jacubick's #1 Goon
- Babes (1991, TV Series) – Ed
- Beverly Hills, 90210 (1991, TV Series) – Neil
- Matlock (1990–1993, TV Series) – Wayne Drummond / Personal Trainer Harry Slade
- The Nanny (1994–1999, TV Series) – Man Exiting Restroom with Fly Open / Man at the Bar / Romeo Actor
- Spread (2009) – Plastic Surgeon
- Happily Divorced (2 episodes, 2011)

=== Director ===
- The Nanny Reunion: A Nosh to Remember (2004)
- Happily Divorced (2 episodes, 2012)
