= Pamela Eells O'Connell =

American screenwriter

- Born: Pamela L. Eells; August 29, 1956 (age 69); San Luis Obispo, California, U.S.
- Occupations: Television producer, writer
- Years active: 1987–2020

Pamela Eells O'Connell (born August 29, 1956) is an American television producer and writer.

Her credits include Charles in Charge, Family Matters, Mad About You, The Nanny, Brotherly Love, Married... with Children, Rude Awakening, Ellen, The Suite Life of Zack & Cody, The Suite Life on Deck, Jessie, Bunk'd, Oye Jassie and Team Kaylie, on Netflix.

She was nominated for two Primetime Emmy Awards for her work on The Suite Life of Zack & Cody, as a part of the producing and writing team. In the first few years of her career she worked with fellow producer and writer Sally Lapiduss until 1995.

In 2010, O'Connell formed the production company Bon Mot Productions, and the first series under the company was the third and final season of The Suite Life on Deck.

== Filmography ==
Year	Title	Credited as			Notes
Year	Title	Producer	Writer	Creator	Notes
1987	Charles in Charge	No	Yes	No	Episode: "Pizza Parlor Protest"
1989–1991	Family Matters	Yes	Yes	No	Wrote 8 episodes, co-produced 11 episodes
1991	Princesses	Yes	Yes	No	Wrote: "Her Highness For Hire"
1992	Step by Step	No	Yes	No	Episode: "Beauty Contest"
1992–1993	Mad About You	Yes	Yes	No	Co-executive producer, wrote 4 episodes
1993–1995	The Nanny	Yes	Yes	No	Co-executive producer, wrote 4 episodes
1994	Madman of the People	Yes	Yes	No	Co-executive producer, wrote 2 episodes
1995	Ellen	Executive	Yes	No	Wrote: "Three Strikes", also co-executive producer
1995	First Time Out	Executive	No	No	Episode: "Psyched Out"
1995–1996	Brotherly Love	Yes	Yes	No	Supervising producer, wrote 2 episodes
1996–1997	Married... with Children	Executive	Yes	No	Wrote 2 episodes
1998	Ask Harriet	No	Yes	No	Wrote 2 episodes
1998–2000	Rude Awakening	Executive	Yes	No	Wrote 4 episodes
2003	Sweet Potato Queens	Executive	Yes	No	TV movie
2005	Brandy & Mr. Whiskers	No	Yes	No	Episode: "Bad Hare Day"
2005–2008	The Suite Life of Zack & Cody	Executive	Yes	No	Wrote 15 episodes, also co-executive producer
2007	Arwin!	No	Yes	No	TV pilot
2008–2011	The Suite Life on Deck	Executive	Yes	No	Developer, wrote 13 episodes
2011	The Suite Life Movie	Yes	No	No	Co-executive producer
2011–2015	Jessie	Executive	Yes	Yes	Creator, wrote 16 episodes
2013–2014	Oye Jassie	No	No	Yes	
2015–2018	Bunk'd	Executive	Yes	Yes	Creator, wrote 11 episodes
2016	Loco por vos	No	Yes	No	Wrote 2 episodes
2019–2020	Team Kaylie	Executive	Yes	No	Developer, wrote 3 episodes

== Nominations ==
Year	Award	Category	Work	Result	Ref.
2007	Primetime Emmy Awards	Outstanding Children's Program	The Suite Life of Zack & Cody	Nominated	
2008	Primetime Emmy Awards	Outstanding Children's Program	The Suite Life of Zack & Cody	Nominated	
