= Sally Lapiduss =

American television producer and writer (born 1956)

- Born: 1956 (age 69–70)
- Occupations: Television producer, television writer
- Years active: 1984–present

Sally Lapiduss (born c. 1956) is an American television producer and writer.

Her credits include Charles in Charge, Family Matters, Mad About You, Ellen, The Nanny, Caroline in the City, Farscape, Titus, The Tracy Morgan Show and Hannah Montana. She was nominated for two Primetime Emmy Awards for her work on the latter series, as a part of the producing and writing team.

She is the sister of fellow producer and writer Maxine Lapiduss. Both sisters are openly lesbian. In the first few years of her career she worked with Pamela Eells O'Connell until 1995.

Lapiduss is a 1974 graduate of Taylor Allderdice High School in Pittsburgh and worked at the Pittsburgh Public Theater in the late 1970s when she was "discovered" by Katharine Hepburn when she arrived in town to see a production of the Seagull, Lapiduss became Hepburn's assistant.
