= Lee Shallat Chemel =

American television director

- Born: June 15, 1943 (age 82); Los Angeles, California, U.S.
- Other name: Lee Shallat
- Occupations: Film director, television director, television producer
- Years active: 1984–present

Lee Shallat Chemel (born June 15, 1943), sometimes credited as Lee Shallat, is an American film and television director and television producer.

She began her professional directorial career at the South Coast Repertory theatre in Costa Mesa, California, while working at the same time as the head of the theatre's conservatory program. She also directed at the Shakespeare|Summerfest Orange County (originally the Grove Shakespeare Festival in Garden Grove, California and the Matrix Theatre in Hollywood. After a meeting with producer Gary David Goldberg, she made her television directorial debut in 1984 on the NBC television show Family Ties. Her career has included directing a multitude of shows including: Diff'rent Strokes, Murphy Brown, Mad About You, Suddenly Susan, Costello, Becker, Sydney, George Lopez, That's So Raven, Arrested Development, and The Middle, among other series. She has been nominated for three Emmy Awards, in 1992, 1994 and 1995. From 1996 to 1997, she directed twenty-three out of the first twenty-four episodes of Spin City.

She became a producer in 1993, producing 30 episodes in the first two seasons of The Nanny, as well as 22 episodes of Gilmore Girls. In 2005, she directed the film Greener Mountains with a cast that included Kimberly McCullough and Curtis Armstrong. She has also directed a few television films.
