= Fran Drescher =

American actress and writer (born 1957)

- Drescher in 2026

3rd National President of SAG–AFTRA
- In office October 15, 2021 – September 12, 2025
- Preceded by: Gabrielle Carteris
- Succeeded by: Sean Astin

Personal details
- Born: Francine Joy Drescher; September 30, 1957 (age 69) New York City, U.S.
- Party: Democratic
- Spouse: Peter Marc Jacobson (m. 1978; div. 1999)
- Domestic partner: Shiva Ayyadurai (2014–2016)
- Occupation: Actress; writer; comedian; producer; trade unionist

Francine Joy Drescher (born September 30, 1957) is an American actress, writer, comedian, producer, and former trade union leader. She played Fran Fine in the television sitcom The Nanny (1993–1999), which she created and produced with her then-husband Peter Marc Jacobson.

Drescher made her screen debut with a small role in the 1977 film Saturday Night Fever and later appeared in American Hot Wax (1978) and Wes Craven's horror film Stranger in Our House (1978). In the 1980s, she worked as a comedic actress in the films Gorp (1980), The Hollywood Knights (1980), Doctor Detroit (1983), This Is Spinal Tap (1984), and UHF (1989), and made guest appearances on several television series.

In 1993, she achieved wider fame as Fran Fine in her own sitcom vehicle The Nanny, for which she was nominated for two Emmy Awards and two Golden Globe Awards for Best Actress in a Comedy Television Series during the show's run. In the 2000s, Drescher starred in the sitcoms Living with Fran and Happily Divorced. From 2012 to 2022, she starred in the animated Hotel Transylvania film series. In 2014, Drescher made her Broadway debut in Cinderella as stepmother Madame. In 2020, she starred in the NBC sitcom Indebted.

The national members of trade union SAG-AFTRA, representing actors and other media professionals, elected Drescher as president, and she took office on October 15, 2021. Drescher led the union during the five-month actors' strike that began on July 14, 2023, partially overlapping with the writers' strike that had begun in May of that year. In July 2024, Drescher led another strike against major video game publishers, which ended in 2025.

== Early life and education ==
Francine Joy Drescher was born on September 30, 1957, in Queens, a borough of New York City, the younger daughter of Sylvia Drescher (born 1934), a bridal consultant, and Morty Drescher (1929 – March 2024), a naval systems analyst. Her family is Jewish, from Southeast and Central Europe. Her maternal great-grandmother Yetta was born in Focșani, Romania, and immigrated to the United States, while her father's family came from Poland. She has an older sister, Nadine. Drescher was a first runner-up for "Miss New York Teenager" in 1973.

She attended Flushing's Parsons Junior High School, which later dissolved, and then Hillcrest High School in Jamaica, Queens. There she met her future husband, Peter Marc Jacobson, whom she married in 1978, at age 21. They divorced in 1999. Drescher graduated from Hillcrest High School in 1975; one of her classmates was comedian Ray Romano. Drescher's character Fran Fine from The Nanny and Romano's character Ray Barone from Everybody Loves Raymond met at a 20th high school reunion on an episode of The Nanny. Drescher and Jacobson attended Queens College, City University of New York, but dropped out in their first year because "all the acting classes were filled." They then enrolled in cosmetology school.

== Career ==
=== Early career ===
Drescher's first break was a small role as dancer Connie in the movie Saturday Night Fever (1977), in which she delivered the line "Hey, are you as good in bed as you are on the dance floor?" to John Travolta's character. A year later, she began to gain attention in films such as American Hot Wax (1978) and Summer of Fear (1978). She also took on a rare dramatic role in the 1981 Miloš Forman film Ragtime. During the 1980s, Drescher found success as a character actress with roles in films such as Gorp (1980), The Hollywood Knights (1980), Doctor Detroit (1983), The Big Picture (1989), UHF (1989), Cadillac Man (1990), and in This Is Spinal Tap (1984) as publicist Bobbi Flekman. She also made an appearance in a second-season episode of Who's the Boss? in 1985 as an interior decorator. She also had an appearance on Night Court as a woman with dissociative identity disorder who flips from a prude to a sexually minded woman and ends up in a hotel with Assistant District Attorney Dan Fielding. In 1990, Drescher appeared on ALF as Roxanne, the wife of grown-up Brian, who had no clue she was a mob boss, in the episode "Future's So Bright I Gotta Wear Shades". In 1991, Drescher co-starred on the short-lived CBS sitcom Princesses. In the early-to-mid 1990s, she voiced "Peggy" from The P Pals on PBS (the woman with the flower on her hat).

=== The Nanny and film roles ===
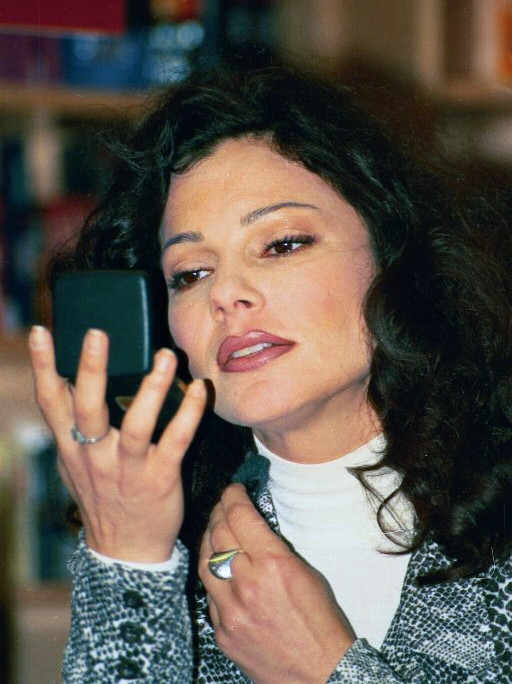
Drescher in 1996

Drescher and Jacobson created their own television show, The Nanny, in 1993. The show aired on CBS from 1993 to 1999, and Drescher became an instant star. In this sitcom, she played a woman named Fran Fine who casually became the nanny of Margaret ("Maggie") (played by Nicholle Tom), Brighton ("B") (played by Benjamin Salisbury), and Grace ("Gracie") Sheffield (played by Madeline Zima); with her wit and her charm, she endeared herself to their widower father: stuffy, composed, proper British gentleman and Broadway producer Maxwell Sheffield (Charles Shaughnessy). She reprised her This is Spinal Tap character of Bobbi Flekman, a look-alike for her Fran Fine character, in season 5, episode 3, of The Nanny. Drescher appeared in Jack (1996), directed by Francis Ford Coppola, The Beautician and the Beast (1997) (for which she was also executive producer) and Picking Up the Pieces (2000) co-starring Woody Allen. She was also the voice of "Pearl" in Shark Bait (2006).

In 2025, she reprised her Spinal Tap role of Bobbi Flekman in Spinal Tap II: The End Continues; prior to this, Flekman had also made an appearance on a 1997 episode of The Nanny.

She appears in Marty Supreme (2025), directed by Josh Safdie as the mother of Timothée Chalamet's character, "Marty Mauser".

=== Return to television ===
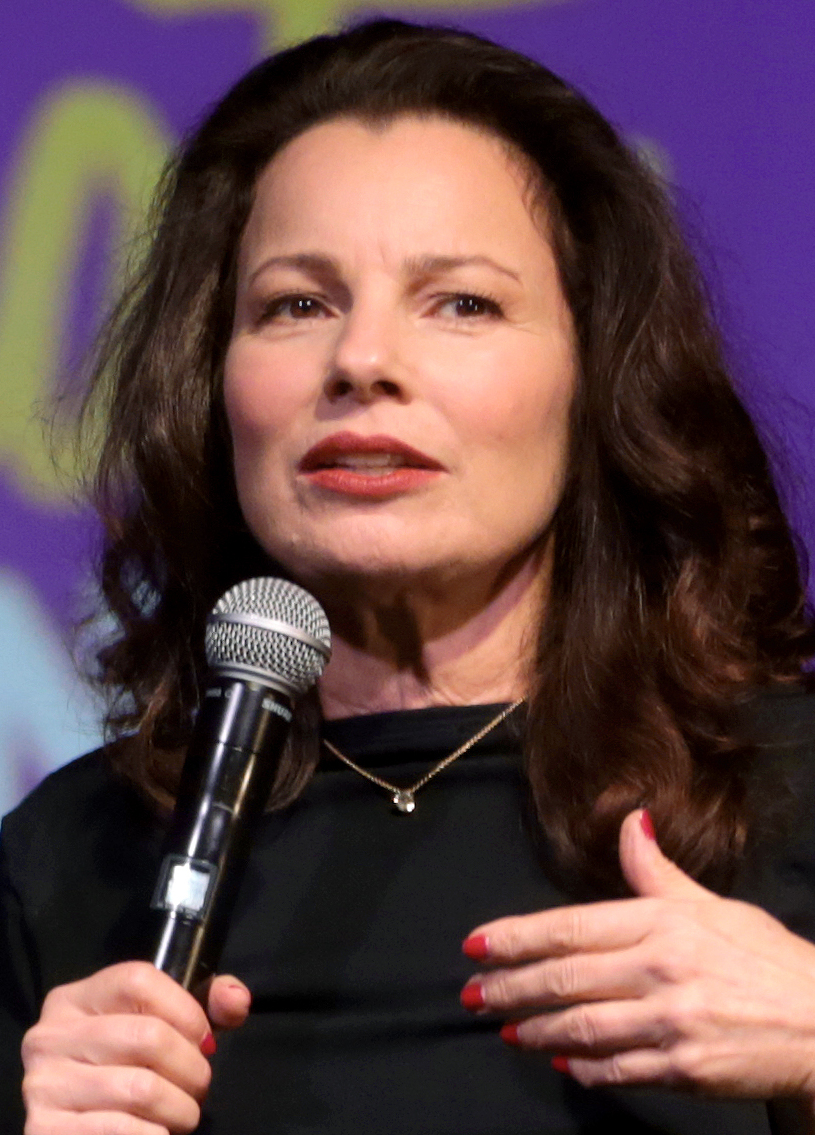
Drescher in 2018

In the 2000s, Drescher made a return to television both with leading and guest roles. In 2003, Drescher appeared in episodes of the short-lived sitcom Good Morning, Miami as Roberta Diaz. In 2005, she returned with the sitcom Living with Fran, in which she played Fran Reeves, a middle-aged mother of two living with Riley Martin (Ryan McPartlin), a man half her age and not much older than her son. Former Nanny costar Charles Shaughnessy appeared as her philandering ex-husband, Ted. Living with Fran was cancelled on May 17, 2006, after two seasons.

In 2006, Drescher guest-starred in an episode of Law & Order: Criminal Intent; the episode, "The War at Home", aired on US television on November 14, 2006. She also appeared in an episode of Entourage and, in the same year, gave her voice to the role of a female golem in The Simpsons episode "Treehouse of Horror XVII". In 2007, Drescher appeared in the US version of the Australian improvisational comedy series Thank God You're Here. In 2008, Drescher announced that she was developing a new sitcom entitled The New Thirty, also starring Rosie O'Donnell. A series about two old high school friends coping with midlife crises, Drescher described the premature plot of the show as "kind of Sex and the City but we ain't getting any! It'll probably be more like The Odd Couple." It was never produced.

In 2010, Drescher returned to television with her own daytime talk show, The Fran Drescher Tawk Show. While the program debuted to strong ratings, it ended its three-week test run to moderate success, resulting in its shelving. The following year, the sitcom Happily Divorced, created by Drescher and her ex-husband, Peter Marc Jacobson, was picked up by TV Land for a ten-episode order. It premiered there June 15, 2011. The show was renewed in July 2011 for a second season of 12 episodes, which aired in spring 2012. On May 1, 2012, TV Land extended the second season and picked up 12 additional episodes, taking the second season total to 24. The back-order of season two debuted later in 2012. Happily Divorced was cancelled in August 2013.

To promote Happily Divorced, Drescher performed the weddings of three gay couples in New York City using the minister's license she received from the Universal Life Church. Drescher hand-picked the three couples, all of whom were entrants into "Fran Drescher's 'Love Is Love' Gay Marriage Contest" on Facebook, based on the stories the couples submitted about how they met, why their relationship illustrated that "love is love" and why they wanted to be married by her.

=== Broadway ===
Drescher made her Broadway debut on February 4, 2014, in the revival of Rodgers and Hammerstein's Cinderella. She replaced Harriet Harris as stepmother Madame for a 10-week engagement. She reprised the role during the North American tour's engagement in Los Angeles, lasting from March through April 2015. Drescher's previous stage performances include an off-Broadway production of Nora Ephron's Love, Loss, and What I Wore, and Camelot at the Lincoln Center with the New York Philharmonic. On January 8, 2020, it was announced that Drescher and Jacobson were writing the book for a musical adaptation of The Nanny. Rachel Bloom and Adam Schlesinger of Crazy Ex-Girlfriend were brought on to compose the songs prior to Schlesinger's death in April 2020, while Marc Bruni (Beautiful: The Carole King Musical) was slated to direct. Drescher will not portray the title role, as she joked that if she did "We'd have to change the title to The Granny."

=== Trade union leader ===
In 2021, Drescher began her campaign to become president of the Screen Actors Guild - American Federation of Television and Radio Artists (SAG-AFTRA) union, citing both her entertainment and political background. Her candidacy came from the "Unite for Strength" faction, and she ran against actor Matthew Modine. On September 2, 2021, SAG-AFTRA announced that Drescher had won the election. On July 13, 2023, after SAG-AFTRA members overwhelmingly voted to authorize a strike action a week prior, Drescher announced the SAG-AFTRA strike was to begin at midnight the following day, running alongside the concurrent Writers Guild of America strike (WGA strike) that began just over two months prior. The strike ended with a tentative deal between the union and the Alliance of Motion Picture and Television Producers which was approved by the SAG-AFTRA board. Drescher was elected to a second two-year term as SAG-AFTRA president in August 2023. On July 25, 2024, ten months after SAG-AFTRA members voted overwhelmingly to authorize another strike against the video game industry, Drescher stated that SAG-AFTRA would begin a strike against major video game publishers, with the strike then going into effect the following day at 12:01 am. On July 9, 2025, the strike ended after SAG-AFTRA members voted to ratify a tentative agreement with more performer safety measures, which was a specific concern for motion capture video game performers, motion capture actors having medics available during high-risk jobs, compounded increases in performer pay at a rate of 15.17% upon ratification and additional 3% increases in November 2025, November 2026 and November 2027 with 95.04% approval.

On August 8, 2025, it was revealed that Drescher, after leading two successful strikes, would not seek re-election to another term as SAG-AFTRA president, with Sean Astin, a member of Drescher's 2023 political slate and negotiating committee, and Chuck Slavin, a SAG-AFTRA New England Local board member, each vying to replace her. During this race, Drescher would endorse Astin to succeed her. Both Astin and his secretary-treasurer running mate Michelle Hurd would be elected to their respective positions.

On August 13, 2025, a month before the election to determine Drescher's successor as SAG-AFTRA president concluded, it was announced that SAG-AFTRA members were able to settle a lawsuit against the SAG-AFTRA Health Plan for negligence which was related to a cyberattack that resulted in a data breach.

== Personal life ==
Fran Drescher met Peter Marc Jacobson when she was 15. The two were high school sweethearts and married at 21. In January 1985, two armed men broke into Drescher and Jacobson's Los Angeles apartment. While one ransacked their home, Drescher and a female friend were raped by the other robber at gunpoint. Jacobson was also attacked, tied up, and forced to witness the entire ordeal. It took Drescher many years to recover, and it took her even longer to tell her story to the press. She was paraphrased as saying in an interview with Larry King that although it was a traumatic experience, she found ways to turn it into something positive. In her book Cancer Schmancer, the actress writes: "My whole life has been about changing negatives into positives." According to Drescher, her rapist, who was on parole at the time of the crime, was returned to prison and given two life sentences.

After separating in 1996, Drescher and Jacobson divorced in 1999. They had no children. Drescher has worked to support LGBTQ rights issues after her former husband came out. Drescher has stated that the primary reason for the divorce was her need to change directions in life. Drescher and Jacobson remain friends and business partners. She has stated that "we choose to be in each other's lives in any capacity. Our love is unique, rare, and unconditional, unless he's being annoying." On September 7, 2014, Drescher and Shiva Ayyadurai participated in a ceremony at Drescher's beach house. Both tweeted that they had married and the event was widely reported as such. Ayyadurai later said it was not "a formal wedding or marriage," but a celebration of their "friendship in a spiritual ceremony with close friends and her family." The couple separated two years later. In March 2024, Drescher's father died at the age of 94.

=== Cancer ===
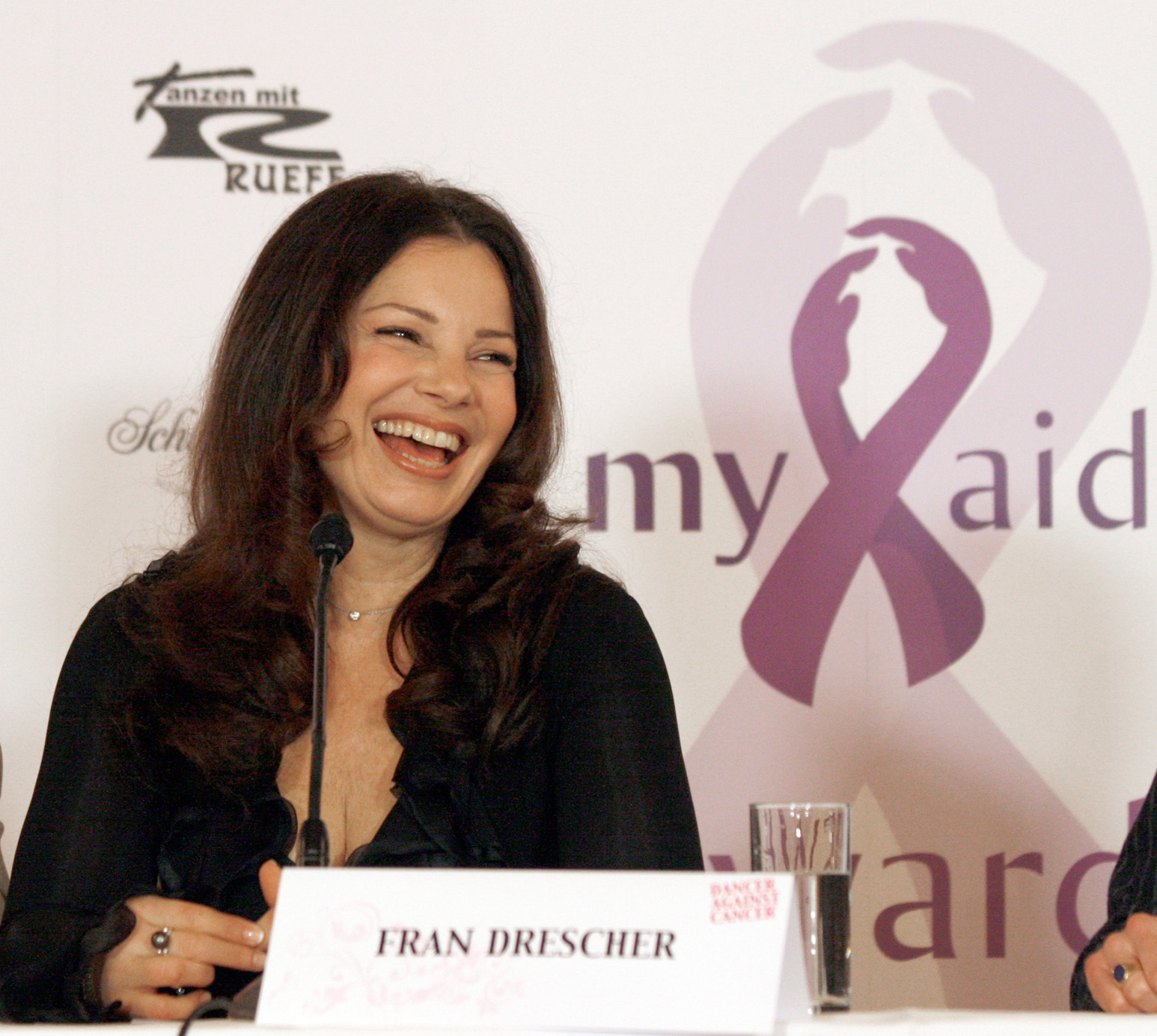
Drescher at a press conference for the Austrian charity Dancer Against Cancer, 2010

After two years of symptoms and misdiagnoses by eight doctors, Drescher was admitted to Los Angeles's Cedars Sinai Hospital on June 21, 2000, after doctors diagnosed her with uterine cancer. She had to undergo an immediate radical hysterectomy to treat the disease. Drescher was declared cancer-free and no post-operative treatment was ordered. Drescher wrote about her experiences in her second book, Cancer Schmancer. Her purpose for this book was to raise consciousness for people "to become more aware of the early warning signs of cancer, and to empower themselves". Drescher says, "I was going to learn what I needed to learn, ask questions, become partners with my doctor instead of having some kind of parent/child relationship."

=== Cancer Schmancer Movement ===
On June 21, 2007, the seventh anniversary of her operation, Drescher launched the Cancer Schmancer Movement, a non-profit organization dedicated to ensuring that all women's cancers be diagnosed while in Stage 1, the most curable stage. She celebrated her tenth year of wellness on June 21, 2010. Drescher says:

We need to take control of our bodies, become greater partners with our physicians and galvanize as one to let our legislators know that the collective female vote is louder and more powerful than that of the richest corporate lobbyists.

She says her goal is to live in a time when women's mortality rates drop as their healthcare improves and early cancer detection increases. Her efforts as an outspoken healthcare advocate in Washington, D.C., helped get unanimous passage for H.R. 1245 (also known as Johanna's Law) and she is acknowledged in the Congressional Record.

=== Politics ===
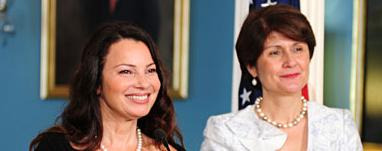
Drescher and Goli Ameri in 2008

In September 2008, Drescher, a Democrat, was appointed as a U.S. diplomat by George W. Bush administration's Assistant Secretary of State Goli Ameri. Her official title was Public Diplomacy Envoy for Women's Health Issues. In traveling throughout the world, she supported U.S. public diplomacy efforts, including working with health organizations and women's groups to raise awareness of women's health issues, cancer awareness and detection, and patient empowerment and advocacy. Her first trip was in late September and included stops in Serbia, Hungary, as well as her ancestral Romania and Poland.

In 2008, Drescher supported Senator Hillary Clinton for the Democratic Party presidential nomination. She attended a Super Democrat rally for Clinton. Drescher said that she had been considering a run for the United States Senate in 2008 to succeed Hillary Clinton, but ultimately decided against it. She endorsed Barack Obama for re-election in 2012. In 2017, she said in an interview she was explicitly anti-capitalist and was happy to see the Green Party gaining some traction. In 2018, Drescher attended a fundraiser gala for Friends of the Israeli Defense Forces (FIDF), which raised $60 million. Drescher received the COVID-19 vaccine but opposes vaccine mandates.

=== Charity ===
In April 2014, Drescher presented at Broadway Cares/Equity Fights AIDS Easter Bonnet Competition with Bryan Cranston, Idina Menzel and Denzel Washington, after raising donations at her Broadway show Cinderella. Drescher became an ordained minister with the Universal Life Church Monastery so that she could legally officiate LGBTQ wedding ceremonies.

== Awards ==
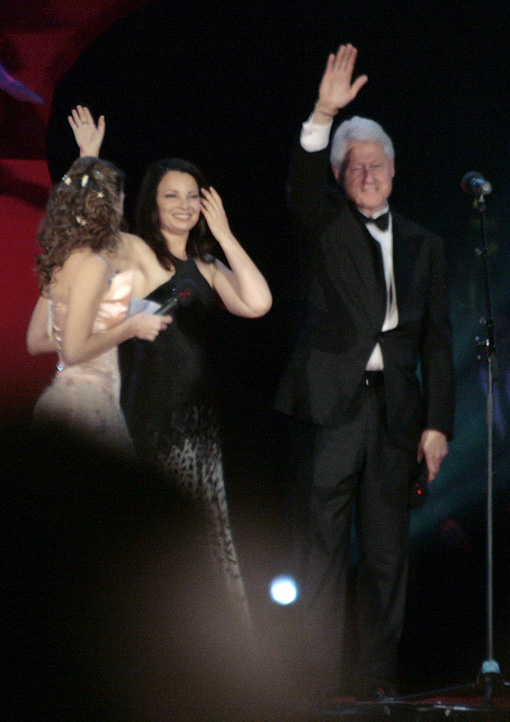
Elke Winkens, Fran Drescher and Bill Clinton at the Life Ball, 2009

Drescher has been the recipient of the John Wayne Institute's Woman of Achievement Award, the Gilda Award, the City of Hope Woman of the Year Award, the Hebrew University Humanitarian Award, and the Albert Einstein College of Medicine's Spirit of Achievement Award. In 2006, she was honored with the City of Hope Spirit of Life Award, which was presented to her by Hillary Clinton. On April 10, 2010, she was guest of honor at the "Dancer against Cancer" charity ball held at the Imperial Palace, Vienna, Austria, where she received the first "My Aid Award" for her achievements in support of cancer prevention and rehabilitation. In 2021, Drescher was awarded the LifeSaver Award by ELEM/Youth in Distress.

== Filmography ==
=== Film ===
Film work by Fran Drescher
| Year | Film | Role | Notes |
|---|---|---|---|
| 1977 | Saturday Night Fever | Connie | |
| 1978 | American Hot Wax | Sheryl | |
| 1978 | Stranger in Our House | Carolyn Baker | |
| 1980 | The Hollywood Knights | Sally | |
| 1980 | Gorp | Evie | |
| 1981 | Ragtime | Mameh | |
| 1983 | Doctor Detroit | Karen Blittstein | |
| 1984 | This Is Spinal Tap | Bobbi Flekman | |
| 1984 | P.O.P. | Maggie Newton | |
| 1984 | The Rosebud Beach Hotel | Linda | |
| 1988 | Rock 'n' Roll Mom | Jody Levin | |
| 1989 | UHF | Pamela Finklestein | |
| 1989 | Love and Betrayal | Germaine | |
| 1989 | The Big Picture | Polo Habel | |
| 1990 | Wedding Band | Veronica | |
| 1990 | Cadillac Man | Joy Munchack | |
| 1990 | Hurricane Sam | Rene Gianelli | |
| 1991 | We're Talking Serious Money | Valerie | |
| 1993 | Without Warning: Terror in the Towers | Rosemarie Russo | Television Movie |
| 1994 | Car 54, Where Are You? | Velma Valour | |
| 1996 | Jack | Dolores "D.D." Durante | |
| 1997 | The Beautician and the Beast | Joy Miller | Nominated – Golden Raspberry Award for Worst Actress |
| 1998 | The Emperor's New Clothes: An All-Star Illustrated Retelling of the Classic Fairy Tale | The Heralding Horn | (voice) |
| 2000 | Picking Up the Pieces | Sister Frida | |
| 2000 | Kid Quick | Kerry | |
| 2003 | Beautiful Girl | Amanda Wasserman | |
| 2005 | Santa's Slay | Virginia Mason | |
| 2006 | Shark Bait | Pearl (voice) | |
| 2011 | Mindwash: The Jake Sessions | Madame LaRue | |
| 2012 | Hotel Transylvania | Eunice Frankenstein (voice) | |
| 2013 | Skum Rocks! | Herself | |
| 2013 | Brave Miss World | Herself | |
| 2015 | Hotel Transylvania 2 | Eunice (voice) | Cameo |
| 2018 | The Creatress | Carrie Robards | |
| 2018 | Hotel Transylvania 3: Summer Vacation | Eunice (voice) | |
| 2019 | After Class | Diane | |
| 2022 | Hotel Transylvania: Transformania | Eunice (voice) | |
| 2025 | Spinal Tap II: The End Continues | Bobbi Flekman | |
| 2025 | Marty Supreme | Rebecca Mauser | |

=== Television ===
Television work by Fran Drescher
| Year | Title | Role | Notes |
|---|---|---|---|
| 1978 | Saturday Night Live | Concert Goer | Episode: "Steve Martin/Van Morrison" |
| 1982 | Fame | Rhonda | Episode: "Metamorphosis" |
| 1983 | 9 to 5 | Tapioca | Episode: "The Oldest Profession" |
| 1985 | Silver Spoons | Annie | Episode: "Marry Me, Marry Me: Part 2" |
| 1985 | 227 | Mrs. Baker | Episode: "The Refrigerator" |
| 1985, 1986 | Who's the Boss? | Carol Patrice, Joyce Columbus | 2 episodes |
| 1986 | Night Court | Miriam Brody | Episode: "Author, Author" |
| 1986 | Charmed Lives | Joyce Columbus | 4 episodes |
| 1987 | Rosie | Vicki Low | Episode: "Valentine of Life" |
| 1990 | ALF | Roxanne | Episode: "Future's So Bright, I Gotta Wear Shades" |
| 1990 | WIOU | Jo Finc | Episode: "Pilot" |
| 1991 | Princesses | Melissa Kirshner | 8 episodes |
| 1991 | Dream On | Kathleen | Episode: "The Second Greatest Story Ever Told" |
| 1992 | Civil Wars | Norma Baker | Episode: "A Bus Named Desire" |
| 1993–1999 | The Nanny | Fran Fine | Lead role, 146 episodes plus special Nominated – American Comedy Award for Funniest Female Performer in a Television Series; Nominated – Golden Globe Award for Best Actress – Television Series Musical or Comedy (1996–1997); Nominated – Primetime Emmy Award for Outstanding Lead Actress in a Comedy Series (1996–1997); Nominated – Satellite Award for Best Actress – Television Series Musical or Comedy |
| 1995 | Space Ghost Coast to Coast | Herself | Episode: "Girlie Show" |
| 2003 | Good Morning, Miami | Roberta Diaz | 3 episodes |
| 2003 | The Restaurant | Herself | 1 episode |
| 2004 | Strong Medicine | Irene Slater | Episode: "Cinderella in Scrubs" |
| 2005–2006 | Living with Fran | Fran Reeves | Lead role, 26 episodes |
| 2005 | What I Like About You | Fran Reeves | Episode: "Girls Gone Wild" |
| 2006 | The Simpsons | The Female Golem | Episode: "Treehouse of Horror XVII" |
| 2006 | Law & Order: Criminal Intent | Elaine Dockerty | Episode: "The War at Home" |
| 2007 | Thank God You're Here | Herself/Ms. Bumblebee | |
| 2007 | SeeMore's Playhouse | Herself | |
| 2008 | Live from Lincoln Center | Morgan Le Fay | Episode: "Camelot" |
| 2008 | Entourage | Mrs. Levine | Episode: "The All Out Fall Out" |
| 2010 | Glenn Martin, DDS | Arlene Stein | Episode: "Dad News Bears" |
| 2010 | The Fran Drescher Show | Host | 16 episodes and also executive producer |
| 2011–2013 | Happily Divorced | Fran Lovett | Lead role, 34 episodes and also executive producer |
| 2015 | Hell's Kitchen | Herself | Episode: "8 Chefs Compete Again" |
| 2017 | Broad City | Beverly Baumgarten | Episode: "Florida" |
| 2018 | Alone Together | Mary | Episode: "Mom" |
| 2019 | Welcome to the Wayne | Barbara Wasserman (voice) | Episode: "Welcome to the Wassermans" |
| 2020 | Indebted | Debbie Klein | Main role, 12 episodes |
| 2020 | The Christmas Setup | Kate Spencer | TV movie |
| 2022 | Mr. Mayor | Angelica Masters | Episode: "Trampage" |
| 2023 | Secrets of the Morning | Agnes Morris | Television film |
| 2026 | The Comeback | Herself | Episode: "Valerie Gets a New Chapter" |

=== Theater ===
Theater work by Fran Drescher
| Year | Title | Role | Venue |
|---|---|---|---|
| 2006 | Some Girl(s) | Lindsay | Lucille Lortel Theatre |
| 2008 | Camelot | Morgan le Fay | Avery Fisher Hall |
| 2010 | Love, Loss, and What I Wore | Performer | Westside Theatre |
| 2014 | Rodgers + Hammerstein's Cinderella | Madame | Broadway Theatre |
| 2015 | Rodgers + Hammerstein's Cinderella | Madame | Ahmanson Theatre |

=== Books ===
| Year | Title | Publisher | ISBN | Notes |
|---|---|---|---|---|
| 1996 | Enter Whining | Regan Books | ISBN 0060391553 | Memoir |
| 2002 | Cancer Schmancer | Grand Central Publishing | ISBN 0759527695 | Memoir |
| 2011 | Being Wendy | Grosset & Dunlap | ISBN 0448456885 | with Amy Blay |

== See also ==
- List of Queens College people
