= 45th Golden Globe Awards =

Film award ceremony in 1988

45th Golden Globes Awards
- Date: January 23, 1988
- Site: Beverly Hilton Hotel; Beverly Hills, Los Angeles, California
- Hosted by: Patrick Duffy; Dyan Cannon

Highlights
- Best Film: Drama: The Last Emperor
- Best Film: Musical or Comedy: Hope and Glory
- Best Drama Series: L.A. Law
- Best Musical or Comedy Series: The Golden Girls
- Most awards: (4) The Last Emperor
- Most nominations: (5) Broadcast News; The Last Emperor; Moonstruck

The 45th Golden Globes Awards, honoring the best in film and television of 1987, as chosen by the Hollywood Foreign Press Association. The ceremony was held on January 23, 1988 at the Beverly Hilton and was produced by Dick Clark Productions and the HFPA. The nominations were announced on January 5, 1988.

== Winners and nominees ==
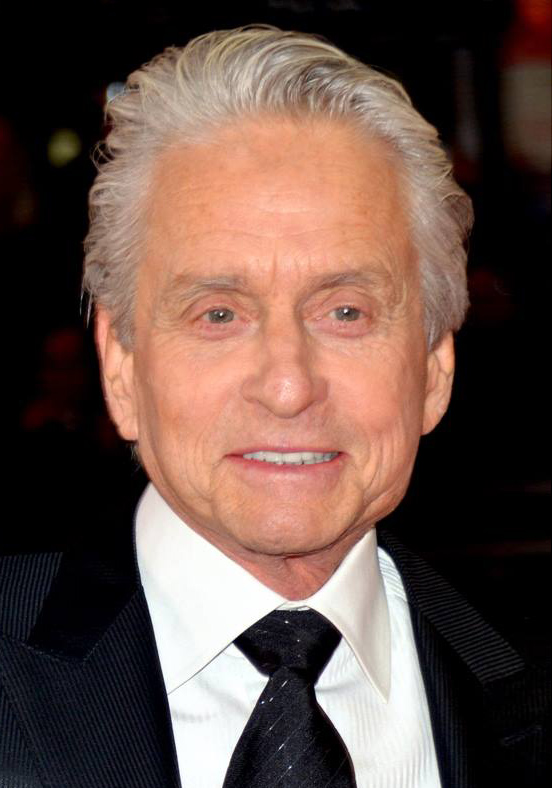
Michael Douglas — Best Actor in a Motion Picture, Drama winner

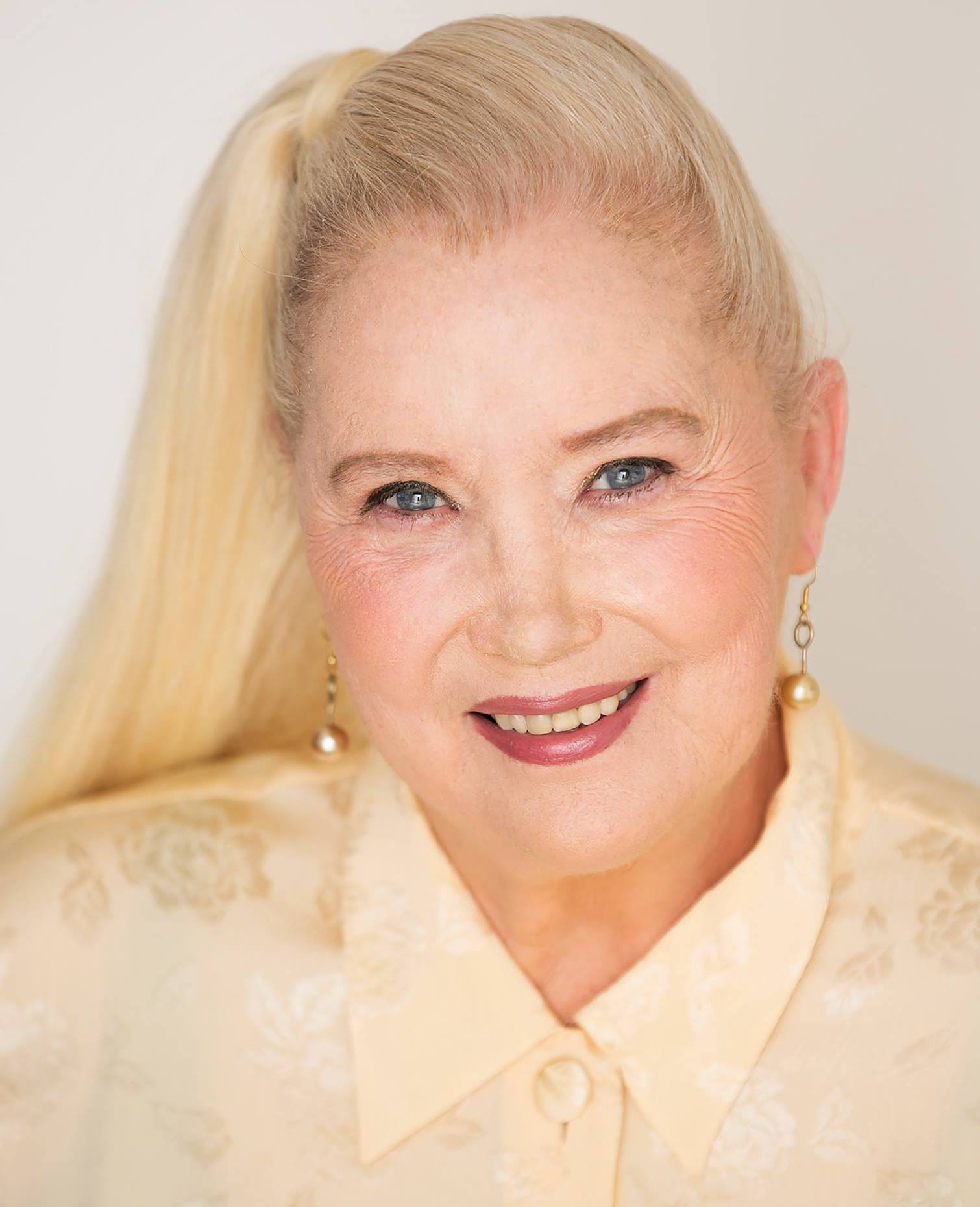
Sally Kirkland — Best Actress in a Motion Picture, Drama winner

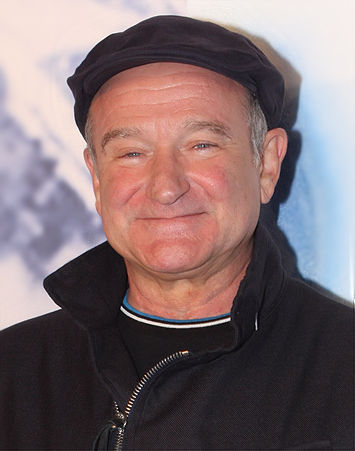
Robin Williams — Best Actor in a Motion Picture, Musical or Comedy winner

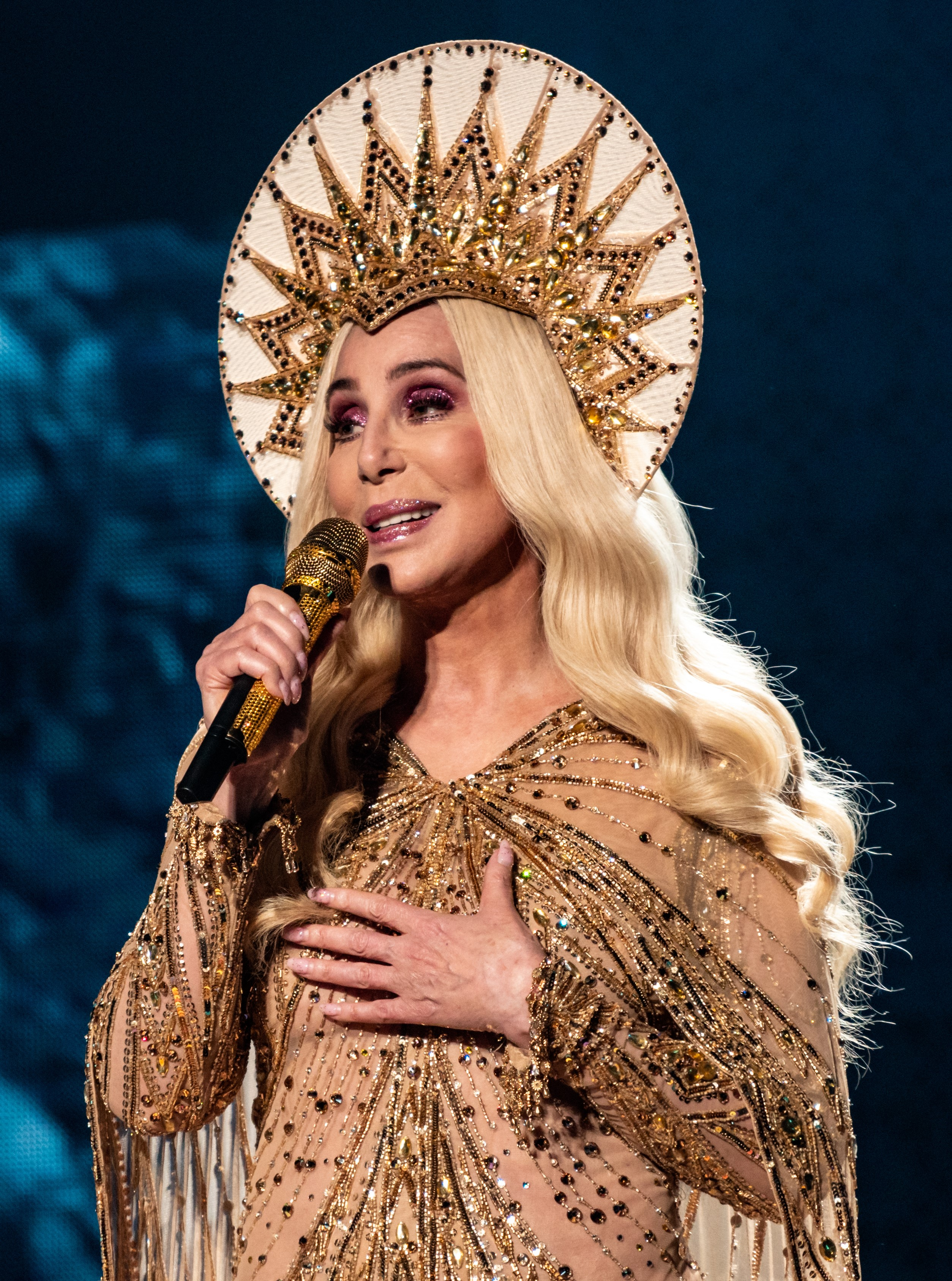
Cher — Best Actress in a Motion Picture, Musical or Comedy winner

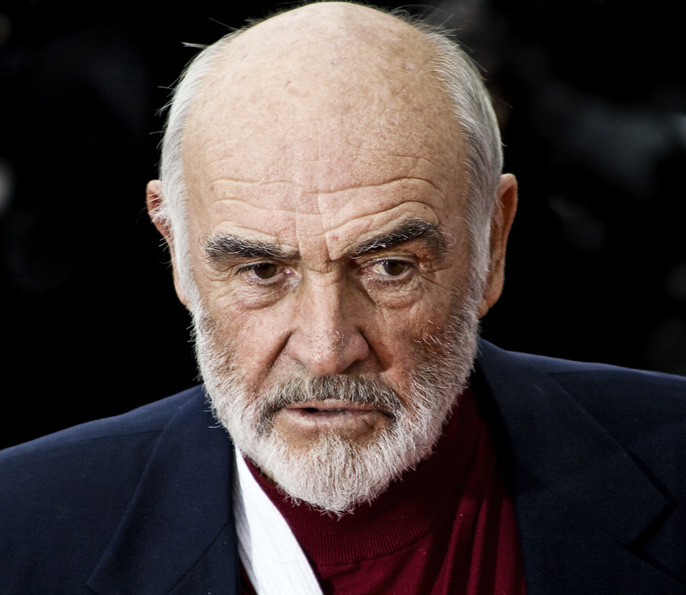
Sean Connery — Best Supporting Actor in a Motion Picture Drama, Musical or Comedy winner

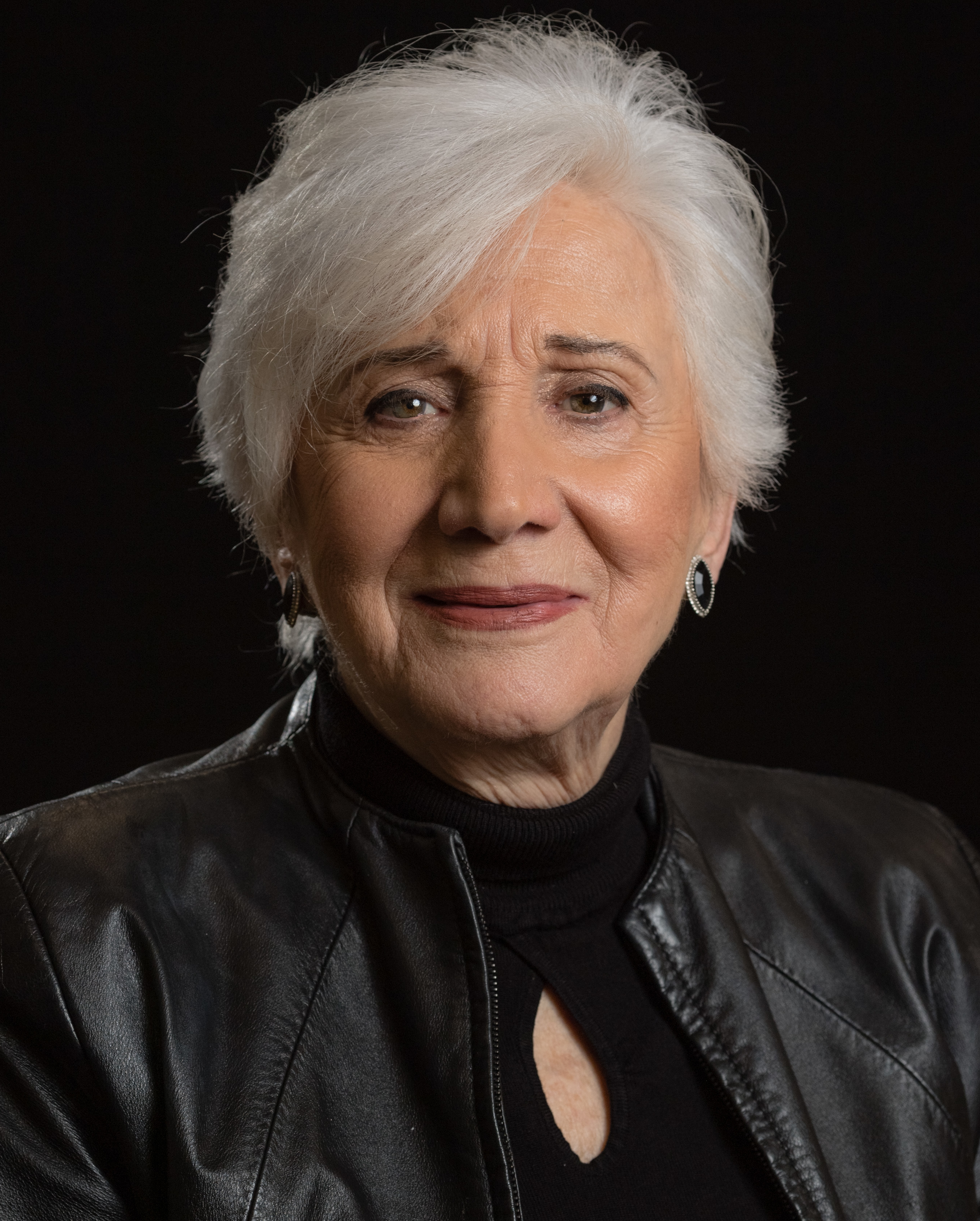
Olympia Dukakis — Best Supporting Actress in a Motion Picture Drama, Musical or Comedy winner

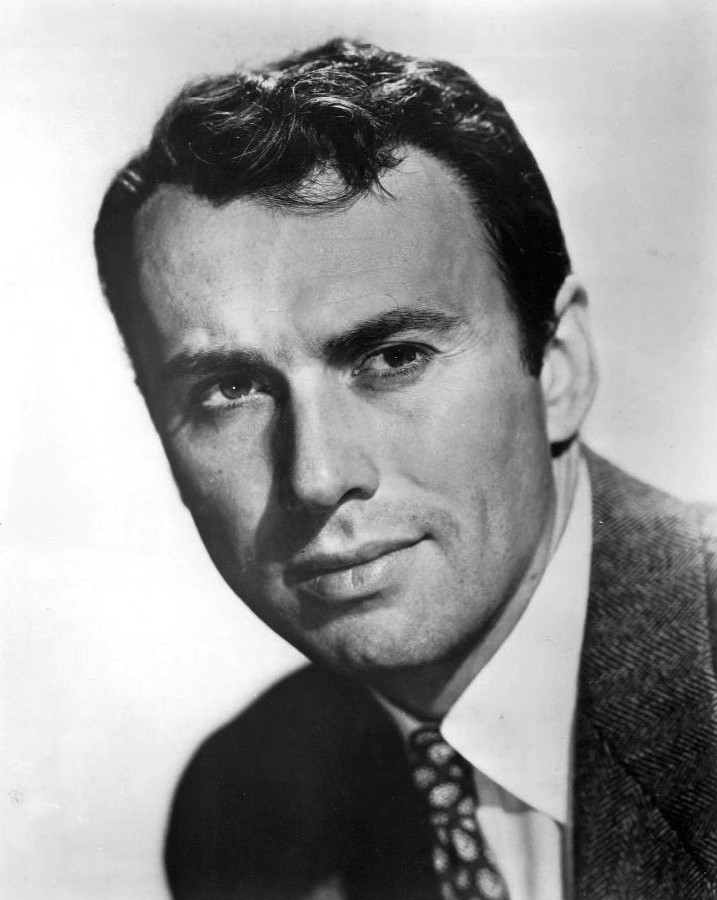
Richard Kiley — Best Actor in a Television Series, Drama winner

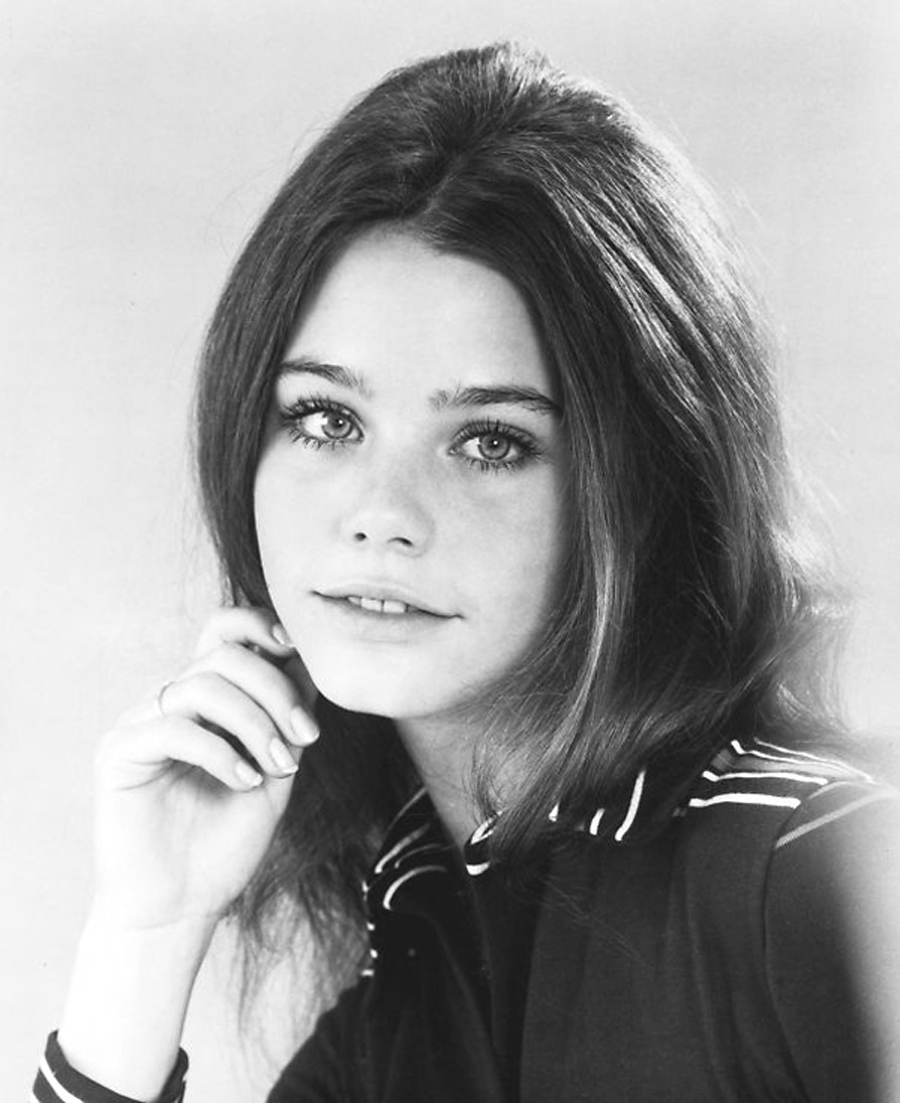
Susan Dey — Best Actress in a Television Series, Drama winner

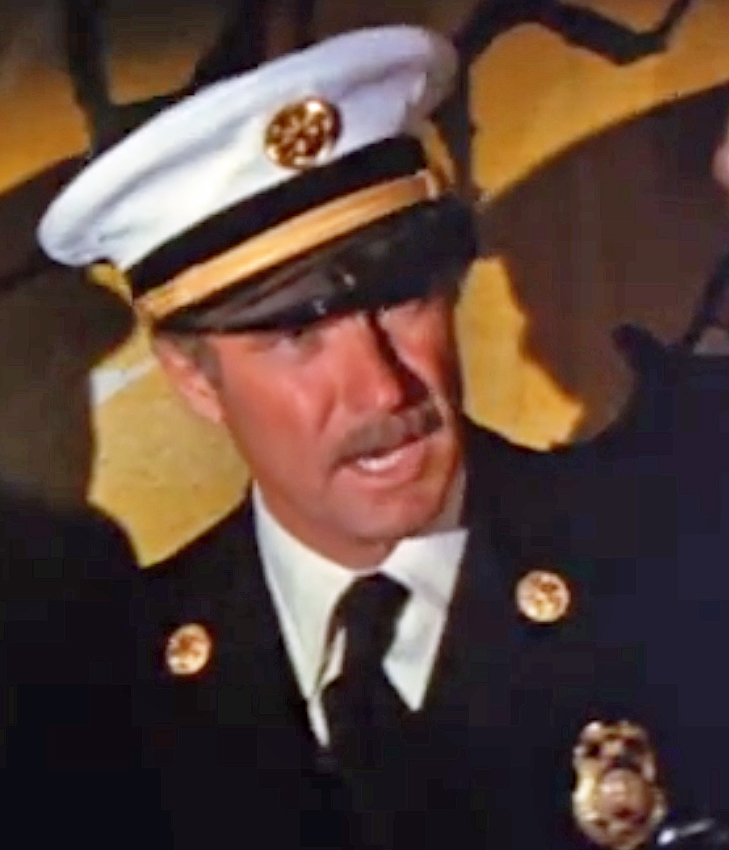
Dabney Coleman — Best Actor in a Television Series, Musical or Comedy winner

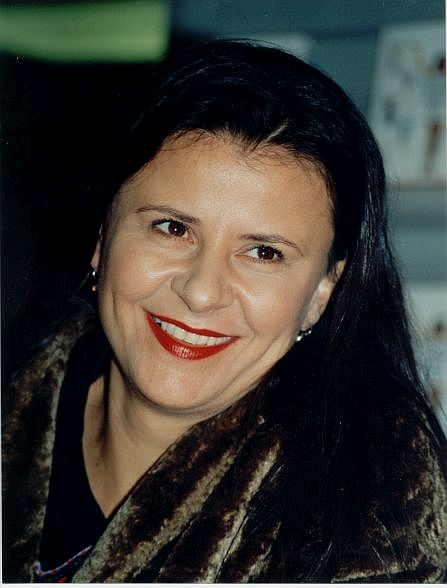
Tracey Ullman — Best Actress in a Television Series, Musical or Comedy winner

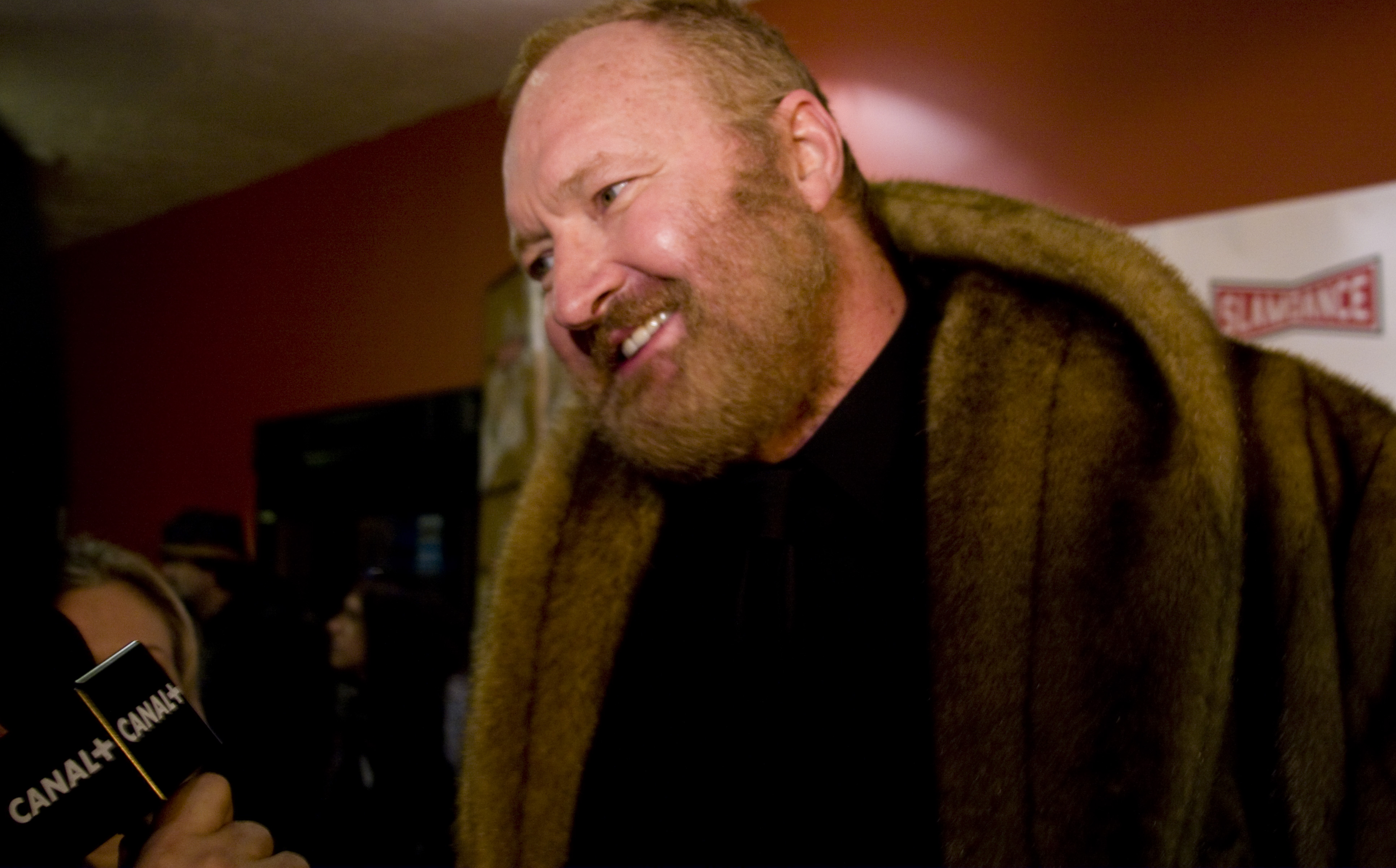
Randy Quaid — Best Actor in a Miniseries or Television Film, winner

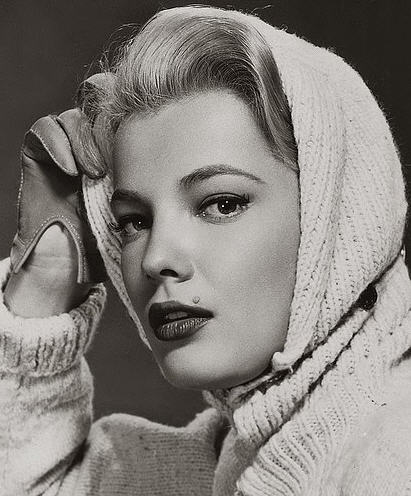
Gena Rowlands — Best Actress in a Miniseries or Television Film, winner

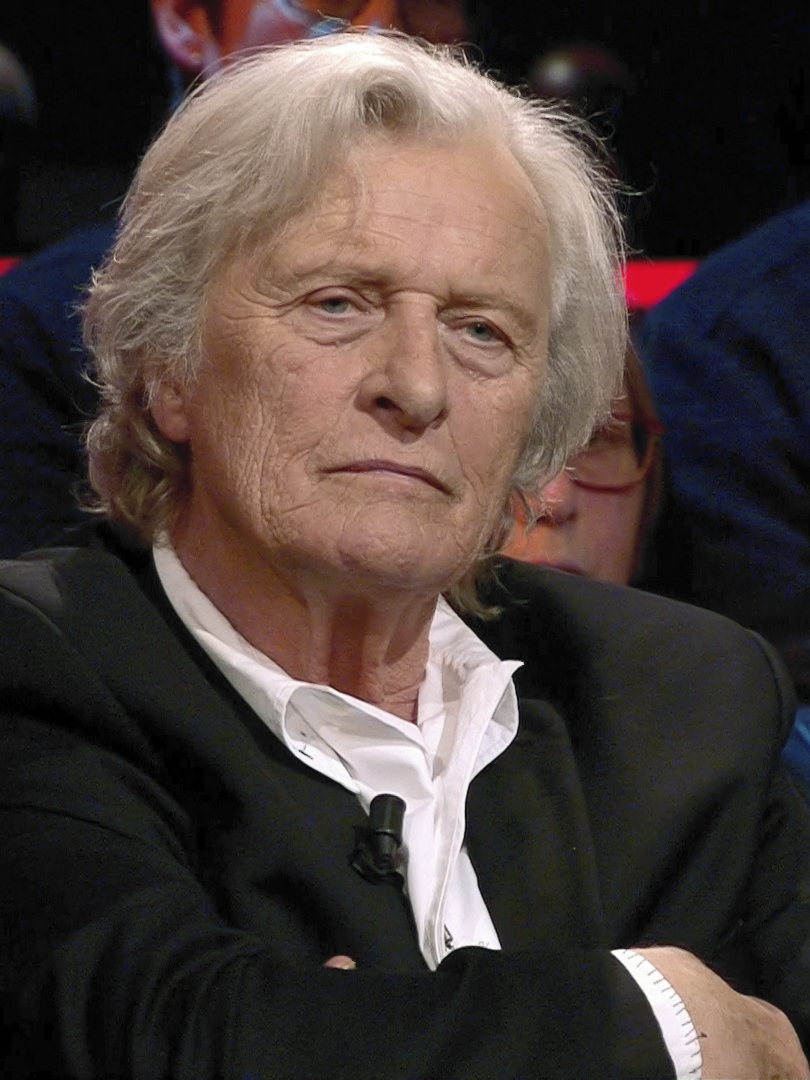
Rutger Hauer — Best Supporting Actor in a Series, Miniseries or Motion Picture Made for Television winner

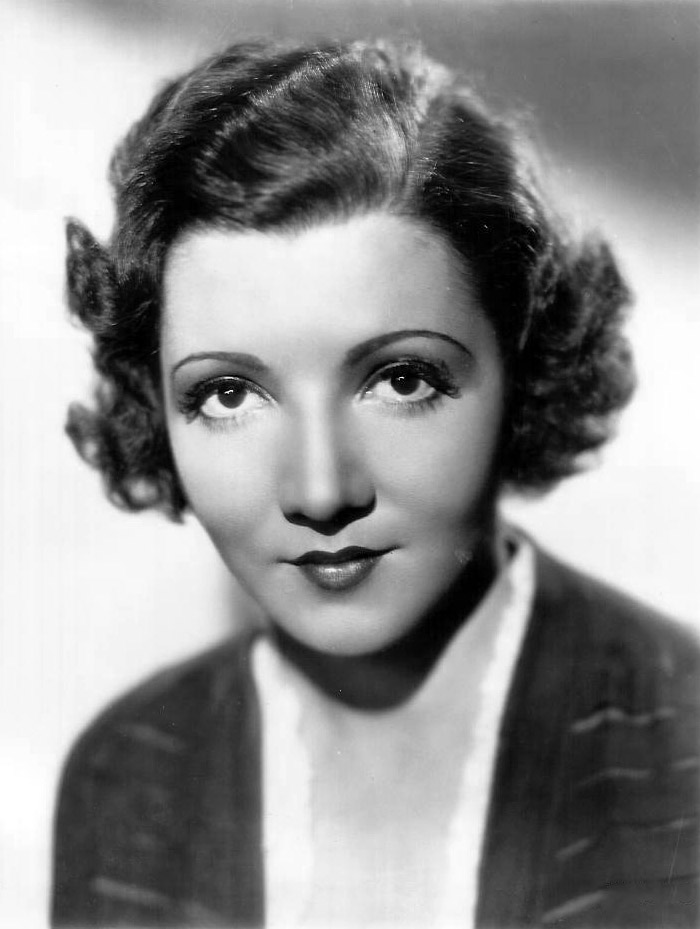
Claudette Colbert — Best Supporting Actress in a Series, Miniseries or Motion Picture Made for Television winner

=== Film ===
Best Motion Picture
Drama	Musical or Comedy
The Last Emperor; Cry Freedom; Empire of the Sun; Fatal Attraction; La Bamba; Nuts	Hope and Glory; Baby Boom; Broadcast News; Dirty Dancing; Moonstruck
Best Performance in a Motion Picture – Drama
Actor	Actress
Michael Douglas – Wall Street as Gordon Gekko; John Lone – The Last Emperor as Puyi; Jack Nicholson – Ironweed as Francis Phelan; Nick Nolte – Weeds as Lee Umstetter; Denzel Washington – Cry Freedom as Steve Biko	Sally Kirkland – Anna as Anna; Rachel Chagall – Gaby: A True Story as Gabriela Brimmer; Glenn Close – Fatal Attraction as Alex Forrest; Faye Dunaway – Barfly as Wanda Wilcox; Barbra Streisand – Nuts as Claudia Draper
Best Performance in a Motion Picture – Comedy or Musical
Actor	Actress
Robin Williams – Good Morning, Vietnam as Adrian Cronauer; Nicolas Cage – Moonstruck as Ronny Cammareri; Danny DeVito – Throw Momma from the Train as Owen Lift; William Hurt – Broadcast News as Tom Grunick; Steve Martin – Roxanne as C.D. Bales; Patrick Swayze – Dirty Dancing as Johnny Castle	Cher – Moonstruck as Loretta Castorini; Jennifer Grey – Dirty Dancing as Frances "Baby" Houseman; Holly Hunter – Broadcast News as Jane Craig; Diane Keaton – Baby Boom as J.C. Wiatt; Bette Midler – Outrageous Fortune as Sandy Brozinsky
Best Supporting Performance in a Motion Picture
Supporting Actor	Supporting Actress
Sean Connery – The Untouchables as Jim Malone; Richard Dreyfuss – Nuts as Aaron Levinsky; R. Lee Ermey – Full Metal Jacket as Gunnery Sergeant Hartman; Morgan Freeman – Street Smart as Leo "Fast Black" Smalls Jr.; Rob Lowe – Square Dance as Rory	Olympia Dukakis – Moonstruck as Rose Castorini; Norma Aleandro – Gaby: A True Story as Florencia Sánchez Morales; Anne Archer – Fatal Attraction as Beth Gallagher; Anne Ramsey – Throw Momma from the Train as Mrs. Lift; Vanessa Redgrave – Prick Up Your Ears as Peggy Ramsay
Other
Best Director	Best Screenplay
Bernardo Bertolucci – The Last Emperor; Richard Attenborough – Cry Freedom; John Boorman – Hope and Glory; James L. Brooks – Broadcast News; Adrian Lyne – Fatal Attraction	The Last Emperor – Bernardo Bertolucci, Mark Peploe and Enzo Ungari; Broadcast News – James L. Brooks; Hope and Glory – John Boorman; House of Games – David Mamet; Moonstruck – John Patrick Shanley
Best Original Score	Best Original Song
The Last Emperor – Ryuichi Sakamoto, David Byrne and Cong Su; Cry Freedom – George Fenton and Jonas Gwangwa; Empire of the Sun – John Williams; The Glass Menagerie – Henry Mancini; The Untouchables – Ennio Morricone	"(I've Had) The Time of My Life" (Franke Previte, John DeNicola and Donald Markowitz) – Dirty Dancing; "Shakedown" (Harold Faltermeyer, Keith Forsey and Bob Seger) – Beverly Hills Cop II; "Nothing's Gonna Stop Us Now" (Albert Hammond and Diane Warren) – Mannequin; "The Secret of My Success" (David Foster, Tom Keane and Tim DuBois) – The Secret of My Success; "Who's That Girl" (Madonna and Patrick Leonard) – Who's That Girl
Best Foreign Language Film
My Life as a Dog (Mitt liv som hund) (Sweden); Dark Eyes (Oci ciornie) (Italy); Goodbye, Children (Au revoir les enfants) (France); Jean de Florette (France); Repentance (Monanieba) (USSR)

The following films received multiple nominations:

Nominations	Title
5	Broadcast News
5	The Last Emperor
5	Moonstruck
4	Cry Freedom
4	Dirty Dancing
4	Fatal Attraction
3	Hope and Glory
3	Nuts
2	Baby Boom
2	Empire of the Sun
2	Throw Momma from the Train
2	The Untouchables
2	Gaby: A True Story

The following films received multiple awards:

Wins	Title
4	The Last Emperor
2	Moonstruck

=== Television ===
Best Television Series
Drama	Comedy or Musical
L.A. Law; Beauty and the Beast; Murder, She Wrote; St. Elsewhere; thirtysomething; A Year in the Life	The Golden Girls; Cheers; Family Ties; Frank's Place; Hooperman; Moonlighting
Best Performance in a Television Series – Drama
Actor	Actress
Richard Kiley – A Year in the Life as Joe Gardner; Harry Hamlin – L.A. Law as Michael Kuzak; Tom Selleck – Magnum, P.I. as Thomas Magnum; Michael Tucker – L.A. Law as Stuart Markowitz; Edward Woodward – The Equalizer as Robert McCall	Susan Dey – L.A. Law as Grace Van Owen; Jill Eikenberry – L.A. Law as Ann Kelsey; Sharon Gless – Cagney & Lacey as Christine Cagney; Linda Hamilton – Beauty and the Beast as Catherine Chandler; Angela Lansbury – Murder, She Wrote as Jessica Fletcher
Best Performance in a Television Series – Comedy or Musical
Actor	Actress
Dabney Coleman – The Slap Maxwell Story as "Slap" Maxwell; Michael J. Fox – Family Ties as Alex P. Keaton; John Ritter – Hooperman as Harry Hooperman; Alan Thicke – Growing Pains as Dr. Jason Roland Seaver; Bruce Willis – Moonlighting as David Addison	Tracey Ullman – The Tracey Ullman Show as various characters; Beatrice Arthur – The Golden Girls as Dorothy Zbornak; Rue McClanahan – The Golden Girls as Blanche Devereaux; Cybill Shepherd – Moonlighting as Maddie Hayes; Betty White – The Golden Girls as Rose Nylund
Best Performance in a Miniseries or Television Film
Actor	Actress
Randy Quaid – LBJ: The Early Years as Lyndon B. Johnson; Alan Arkin – Escape from Sobibor as Leon Feldhendler; Mark Harmon – After the Promise as Elmer Jackson; Jack Lemmon – Long Day's Journey Into Night as James Tyrone Sr.; Judd Nelson – Billionaire Boys Club as Joe Hunt; James Woods – In Love and War as James Stockdale	Gena Rowlands – The Betty Ford Story as Betty Ford; Ann-Margret – The Two Mrs. Grenvilles as Ann Arden Grenville; Farrah Fawcett – Poor Little Rich Girl: The Barbara Hutton Story as Barbara Hutton; Shirley MacLaine – Out on a Limb as herself; Raquel Welch – Right to Die as Emily Bauer
Best Supporting Performance - TV Series, Miniseries or Television Film
Supporting Actor	Supporting Actress
Rutger Hauer – Escape from Sobibor as Alexander Pechersky; Kirk Cameron – Growing Pains as Michael Aaron "Mike" Seaver; Dabney Coleman – Sworn to Silence as Martin Costigan; John Hillerman – Magnum, P.I. as Jonathan Higgins; John Larroquette – Night Court as Daniel R. "Dan" Fielding; Brian McNamara – Billionaire Boys Club as Dean Karny; Alan Rachins – L.A. Law as Douglas Brackman, Jr.; Gordon Thomson – Dynasty as Adam Carrington	Claudette Colbert – The Two Mrs. Grenvilles as Alice Grenville; Allyce Beasley – Moonlighting as Agnes DiPesto; Julia Duffy – Newhart as Stephanie Vanderkellen; Christine Lahti – Amerika as Alethea Milford; Rhea Perlman – Cheers as Carla Tortelli
Best Miniseries or Television Film
Escape from Sobibor; Poor Little Rich Girl: The Barbara Hutton Story; After the Promise; Echoes in the Darkness; Foxfire

The following programs received multiple nominations:

Nominations	Title
6	L.A. Law
4	The Golden Girls
4	Moonlighting
3	Escape from Sobibor
2	After the Promise
2	Beauty and the Beast
2	Billionaire Boys Club
2	Cheers
2	Family Ties
2	Growing Pains
2	Hooperman
2	Magnum P.I.
2	Murder, She Wrote
2	Poor Little Rich Girl: The Barbara Hutton Story
2	A Year in the Life
2	The Two Mrs. Grenvilles

The following programs received multiple wins:

Wins	Title
2	Escape from Sobibor
2	L.A. Law

== Ceremony ==
=== Presenters ===
- Richard Dean Anderson
- Ann-Margret
- Richard Attenborough
- Kevin Bacon
- Corbin Bernsen
- Pam Dawber
- Sandy Duncan
- Fred Dyer
- Ann Jillian
- Lorenzo Lamas
- Marlee Matlin
- Marilyn McCoo
- Donna Mills
- Leonard Nimoy
- Jerry Orbach
- Ron Perlman
- Lou Diamond Phillips
- Christopher Reeve
- Cynthia Rhodes
- Mickey Rooney
- Katharine Ross
- Emma Samms
- Connie Sellecca
- Tom Selleck
- Ally Sheedy
- Cybill Shepherd
- Yakov Smirnoff
- Robert Wagner
- James Woods

=== Cecil B. DeMille Award ===
Clint Eastwood

== See also ==
- 60th Academy Awards
- 8th Golden Raspberry Awards
- 39th Primetime Emmy Awards
- 40th Primetime Emmy Awards
- 41st British Academy Film Awards
- 42nd Tony Awards
- 1987 in film
- 1987 in American television
