= Lauren Lane =

American actress

- Born: February 2, 1961 (age 65); Oklahoma City, Oklahoma, U.S.
- Education: University of Texas at Arlington
- Occupations: Actress, professor
- Years active: 1984–present
- Known for: C.C. Babcock (The Nanny)
- Spouse: David Wilkins (m. 1998; div. 2009)
- Children: 1

Lauren Lane (born February 2, 1961) is an American actress and professor. She is best known for her role as C.C. Babcock on The Nanny (1993–1999).

== Life and career ==
Lane was born in Oklahoma City, Oklahoma, and raised in Arlington, Texas. She attended Lamar High School and received a Bachelor of Fine Arts degree from the University of Texas at Arlington. Lane also earned a Master's degree in the advanced training program at the American Conservatory Theater in San Francisco. In 2013, she briefly taught at Carnegie Mellon University. As of April 2026, Lane is on the faculty of the Department of Theatre and Dance at Texas State University in San Marcos, which she joined in 2004.

Lane married businessman David Wilkins in 1998. They divorced in 2009. Together they have a daughter, Kate Wilkins.

Lane began her acting career in the 1984 film, Interface. She went on to appear in television and film productions such as Positive I.D., Nervous Ticks, Hunter, and L.A. Law, before being cast as C.C. Babcock in The Nanny in 1993. Lane starred in The Nanny until the show ended in 1999. She also appeared on The Daily Show in August 1997.

In the 2000 film Gen^{13}, Lane voiced Ivana Baiul. In December 2004, she joined the rest of the cast of The Nanny for the Lifetime one-hour special, The Nanny Reunion: A Nosh to Remember.

Since 2000, Lane has performed in various productions at the Zachary Scott Theatre, in Austin, Texas. In 2010, she was a guest on The Fran Drescher Show. In 2015, she starred in a one-off performance in A. R. Gurney's Love Letters opposite her The Nanny co-star Daniel Davis with proceeds going to the Texas State Bachelor of Fine Arts Acting Program.

== Filmography ==
Film roles
Year	Title	Role	Notes
1984	Interface	Amy Witherspoon	
1987	Positive I.D.	Dana	Credited as Laura Lane
1992	Nervous Ticks	Blonde	
1993	Perry Mason: The Case of the Skin-Deep Scandal	Lauren Kent	
1999	Gen^{13}	Ivana Baiul	Voice role
2001	The Cutting Room	Joan Swanson	
2019	Dress Code	Sylo	Short Film

Television roles
Year	Title	Role	Notes
1991	Hunter	Police Sgt. Chris Novak	Main role (season 7), 11 episodes
1991–1992	L.A. Law	Julie Rayburn	Recurring role, 5 episodes
1993	South Beach	Brooke Wyatt	1 episode
1993–1999	The Nanny	Chastity Claire 'C.C.' Babcock	Main role, 144 episodes
1995	Burke's Law	Tanya Lovette	1 episode
1996	Duckman	Director's Assistant	Voice role; 1 episode
1999	Partners	Barbara	Unsold television pilot
2004	The Nanny Reunion: A Nosh to Remember	Herself	Television special
2010	The Fran Drescher Show	Herself	1 episode

== Theatre ==
Theater roles
Year	Title	Role	Notes
1989	Judevine		
1992, 1994	The Madman on the Roof & Electra, The Actor's Gang		
2001	Dinner with Friends	Karen	
2005	The Vagina Monologues		
2007, 2008	The Dick Monologues		
2008	The Clean House	Lane	
2009	House of Several Stories	Mother	
2010	Becky's New Car	Becky	
2010	Celebrity Autobiography		
2011	A Writer's Vision(s)		
2011	August: Osage County	Barbara	
2011	Cherry Orchard	Madame Ranyévskaya	
2011	God of Carnage	Veronica Novak	
2013	Harvey	Veta Louise	
2014	Vanya and Sonia and Masha and Spike	Sonia	
