= Andrew Solt =

American filmmaker (born 1947)

- Born: Andrew W. Solt; 13 December 1947 (age 78); London, England
- Occupation: President of SOFA Entertainment
- Known for: Television documentary production

Andrew Solt (born 13 December 1947) is a British-born American producer, director, and writer of documentary films. Solt has had a long career in television. A frequent focus of his documentaries is rock and roll music, its history and star performers.

Solt owns the rights to The Ed Sullivan Show library, and has produced more than 100 hours of new programming from the archive.

== Personal life ==
Solt was born in London and spent his early years in South Africa before moving to Los Angeles in 1959. Solt graduated from Hollywood High School before attending University of California, Los Angeles where he received a B.A. in Spanish. He also earned a master's degree in broadcast journalism from U.C.L.A. Solt is married to Claudia Falkenburg. She is the daughter of 1948 Wimbledon men's singles tennis champion Bob Falkenburg and the niece of 1950s actress-model-TV personality Jinx Falkenburg. He and his wife have two children, Joshua and Dakota. Solt is the nephew of Hungarian-born screenwriter Andrew P. Solt (The Al Jolson Story, Joan of Arc, In a Lonely Place).

== Career ==
In 1970, Solt began working at David L. Wolper's production company. He worked with the National Geographic Society on their various other network specials; while there, he began a longer-term collaboration with the award-winning producer. Wolper executive-produced two of Solt's documentaries, This is Elvis (1981) and Imagine: John Lennon (1988). Solt speaking at the memorial service for Wolper, who died 10 August 2010, described the many producers who cut their teeth there as having attended "Wolper U".

In the late 1970s and early 1980s, Solt worked on television projects with Jacques-Yves Cousteau, the pioneer underwater explorer. He wrote and produced Oasis in Space (1976–77), a six-part half-hour series executive produced by Cousteau and his son Philippe. Solt received the first of nine Emmy nominations for the show's "Calypso's Search for Atlantis" episode. He also produced Cousteau Odyssey (1977–78), four one-hour specials about deep-sea explorations shot in the waters off Greece; and The Mississippi—Reluctant Ally (1984). The two-hour documentary about the US's longest river won the 1985 Emmy for Outstanding Informational Special. The award was shared by Solt, Cousteau and his son, Jean-Michel Cousteau.

In 1979, Solt teamed with producer/director Malcolm Leo on Heroes of Rock and Roll. One of the first comprehensive documentaries to be made about rock music, the two-hour television special was broadcast on ABC. Time magazine music critic Jay Cocks called the show "a first-rate primer of rock history" and said the producers had paid "particular attention to getting the roots—in country and rhythm and blues—right." Solt and Leo also produced the 1982 film It Came from Hollywood, a compilation of over 100 "Golden Turkey" movies, featuring Gilda Radner, Dan Aykroyd, John Candy and Cheech and Chong.

Solt again examined rock and roll in 1995 as executive producer of Time-Life's The History of Rock 'n' Roll. The series, divided into 10 one-hour episodes for home video, was also syndicated and later shown on PBS and cable. It chronologically documents rock music from its roots in the early 1950s to Nirvana and U2 in the 1990s. Other music-themed Solt productions include 25×5: the Continuing Adventures of the Rolling Stones (1989) and Elvis: The Great Performances (1989).

== Ed Sullivan Library ==
In 1990 Solt purchased the exclusive rights to the complete library of The Ed Sullivan Show from Ed Sullivan's daughter Elizabeth and her husband Bob Precht, paying between $5 and $10 million. The collection consists of 1,087 hours of kinescopes and videotapes broadcast by CBS on Sunday nights from 1948 to 1971. Solt bought the entirety of the one-hour shows believing he was "acquiring a priceless piece of Americana".

Included are more than 10,000 live performances by virtually every popular entertainer of the post-war era. Best known are appearances by Elvis Presley and the Beatles that have become part of television and cultural history. Three Sullivan shows from the 1950s featured Presley. On the final one, he was only shown from the waist up because CBS censors viewed his pelvic gyrations as sexually suggestive. The American television debut of the Beatles on 9 February 1964 attracted 73 million viewers. The Beatles also appeared the following two weeks and did a fourth Sullivan show on 12 September 1965.

Solt's production company, SOFA Entertainment, catalogued, organised and cleared performance rights for the original shows. Over the years, they have been edited into various formats including network specials, a half-hour syndicated series (airing on TV Land, PBS, VH1 and Decades following its broadcast run), and home video compilations. There are also video and audio downloads and an app on iTunes.

The first show produced by Solt, The Very Best of the Ed Sullivan Show, aired on CBS 17 February 1991, 20 years after the original series went off the air. The two-hour collection of highlights was the second highest-rated special of the year after the Academy Awards and helped revive Sullivan's reputation as one of the key figures from television's golden age. "It was by almost any measure the last great TV show", wrote New York Daily News television critic David Hinckley, "one of our fondest, dearest pop culture memories."

Following its success, Solt continued to mine the archive, producing sequel specials and thematically-organized broadcasts along with video and DVD releases such as Rock 'n Roll Revolution, A Really Big Show: Ed Sullivan's 50th Anniversary, Ed Sullivan's Rock & Roll Classics, Great Moments in Opera, Rock 'n' Roll Forever, The Best of Broadway Musicals.

SOFA has brought out individual DVD sets of the Beatles and Elvis appearances: The Four Complete Ed Sullivan Shows Featuring the Beatles and Elvis—The Ed Sullivan Shows. Each consists of restored versions of the entire shows on which the Beatles and Elvis appeared, including all the other acts as well as commercials. The Ed Sullivan Show – The 4 Complete Shows Starring The Beatles was reissued in September 2010 with additional footage.

== Awards ==
Solt won an Emmy for The Mississippi – Reluctant Ally sharing the Outstanding Informational Special award with Jacques-Yves Cousteau and Jean-Michel Cousteau. He won a Grammy in 2001 for Best Long-Form Music Video for producing and directing Gimme Some Truth – The Making of John Lennon's Imagine Album, shared with Yoko Ono, Greg Vines and Leslie Tong.

== Books ==
- John Lennon: Imagine (MacMillan Publishing, 1988)
- A Really Big Show: A Visual History of the Ed Sullivan Show, co-edited with Claudia Falkenburg; text by John Leonard (Viking Studio Books, 1992)

== Selected credits ==
- The Explorers series, ABC, 1973
- Wide World of Entertainment eight specials, ABC, 1975
- Oasis in Space – 6 Jacques Cousteau specials, PBS, 1976–77
- Cousteau Odyssey – 4 Jacques Cousteau specials, PBS, 1977–78
- Heroes of Rock 'n Roll, ABC, 1979
- Bob Hope Special: Bob Hope's Overseas Christmas Tours I & II (6 hours), NBC, 1980
- This is Elvis, Warner Bros., 1981
- It Came From Hollywood, Paramount, 1982
- E.T. & Friends: Magical Movie Visitors, CBS, 1982
- Those Wonderful TV Game Shows, NBC, 1983
- Primetimes, 1983
- Donald Duck's 50th Birthday, CBS, 1984
- Cousteau: Mississippi, Emmy winner, Turner 1985
- America Censored, CBS, 1985
- The Honeymooners Reunion, NBC, 1985
- The Muppets: A Celebration of 30 Years, CBS, 1986
- Great Moments in Disney Animation, ABC, 1986
- Disney's DTV Valentine (A.K.A. Romancin'), NBC, 1986
- Disney Goes to the Oscars (Academy Awards), ABC, 1986
- Great Moments in Disney Animation (Emmy nomination), ABC, 1987
- Disney's DTV Doggone Valentine, NBC, 1987
- Disney's DTV Monster Hits, NBC, 1987
- Remembering Marilyn (documentary), ABC, 1988
- Imagine: John Lennon, Warner Bros., 1988
- Learned Pigs & Fireproof Women, CBS, 1989
- 25×5: the Continuing Adventures of the Rolling Stones, Sony, 1989
- Elvis: The Great Performances, Buena Vista Home Video, 1990
- The Very Best of the Ed Sullivan Show, CBS, 1991
- Elvis: The Great Performances, CBS, 1992
- Holiday Greeting from the Ed Sullivan Show, CBS, 1992
- TV Guide: 40th Anniversary Special, FOX, 1993
- The Andy Griffith Show Reunion, CBS, 1993
- The Knots Landing Block Party, CBS, 1993
- Sesame Street's All-Star 25th Birthday: Stars and Street Forever!, ABC, 1994
- The Best of Broadway Musicals from the Ed Sullivan Show, 1994
- Grammy's Greatest Moments, CBS, 1994
- All My Children's 25th Anniversary, ABC, 1995
- The History of Rock 'n' Roll, Syndicated Series, 1995
- The Ed Sullivan All-Star Comedy Special, CBS, 1995
- The Hunt for Amazing Treasures, NBC, 1995
- Rock 'n Roll Revolution: The British Invade America, CBS, 1997
- 50 Years of Television: A Celebration of the TV Academy Golden Anniversary, HBO, 1997
- Great Moments in Opera, PBS, 1997
- Elvis: From the Waist Up, VH1, 1997
- Rogues Gallery, TLC series, 1997
- Intimate Portrait: Mary Tyler Moore, 1998
- CBS: The First 50 Years, CBS, 1998
- A Really Big Show: Ed Sullivan's 50th Anniversary, CBS, 1998
- Rock 'n Roll Forever: Ed Sullivan's Greatest Hits, CBS, 1999
- DJ Games (series), 2000
- Things That Go Bump: Facing Our Fears, 2000
- Ed Sullivan's Rock 'n Roll Classics, VH1 series, 1999–2001
- Gimme Some Truth: The Making of John Lennon's Imagine, Grammy winner, 2001
- Bellbottoms to Boogie Shoes: The 70's, 2001
- 50 Years of NBC Late Night, NBC, 2002
- "Smallville" Backstage Special, 2004
- NBC's 75th Anniversary Special, NBC, 2002
- Las Vegas Then & Now, Destination: The Strip, 2002
- The Golden Girls: Their Greatest Moments, Lifetime, 2003
- CBS 75th Anniversary Special, CBS, 2003
- Elvis: The Ed Sullivan Shows, 2006
- Ed Sullivan Presents: Rock 'N Roll Revolution – the British Invasion, 2011
- Elvis: The Great Performances, 2011
- The Four Complete Ed Sullivan Shows Starring the Beatles, 2011
- Motown Gold from the Ed Sullivan Show, 2011
- The Best of "The Temptations" on the Ed Sullivan Show, 2011
- The Best of "The Supremes" on the Ed Sullivan Show, 2011
- All Six Ed Sullivan Shows Starring "The Rolling Stones", 2011
- Steve Martin: The Television Stuff (box set—6 specials and bonus disc), 2012
- The Night That Changed America: A Grammy Salute to the Beatles, CBS, 2014
- Great Broadway Musical Moments from the Ed Sullivan Show, PBS, 2015
