= Michael James Love =

- Occupations: Screenwriter, film director, film producer
- Known for: Gaby: A True Story; For Greater Glory

Michael James Love (aka Michael Love) is an American screenwriter, producer, and film director. Love has written many screenplays, including Mavericks for Playtone, for Icon and Universal Studios, and Tina Modotti for Mick Jagger's Jagged Films and Warner Brothers.

== Early life ==
Love grew up in Mexico City of American parents and attended Cal Arts at Valencia California. Love is also a jazz pianist and has a BA degree in music composition from Cal Arts.

== Career ==
In 1987 Love wrote the screenplay for the Academy Award-nominated Gaby: A True Story directed by Luis Mandoki about Gabriela Brimmer, the Mexican poet with cerebral palsy, starring Liv Ullmann, Robert Loggia, and Norma Aleandro. In 1993, Love wrote the original screenplays for the ABC 'Movie of the Week' Shattering the Silence and in 1996 the Spanish-language feature film Extranos Caminos. In 2010 Love wrote the screenplay for the Spanish language film La Leyenda De Las Arcas released in 2011. Love wrote the original screenplay for the historical epic Cristiada, aka For Greater Glory, directed by Dean Wright and produced by NewLand Films about the Cristero War in Mexico (1926–1929), starring Andy García, Peter O'Toole, Bruce Greenwood, Eva Longoria, and Rubén Blades. Cristiada was released internationally by Relativity Media and Arc Entertainment, and was nominated for five Alma Awards.

As a writer, producer, director, Love made three feature films with his ex-wife Tina Love: Hold it Like a Baby (2009), and the documentaries Last Man in Paradise (2011) and Much Ado About W. (2007), all of which had their world premieres at the Santa Barbara International Film Festival.

Love has also made two feature documentaries and several shorts, such as The Santa Ynez River Wilderness (2012), which premiered at the 2013 Santa Barbara International Film Festival. The Santa Ynez River wilderness won the 2013 San Luis Obispo International Film Festival CCF Best Documentary Film Award, and Bringing Back the Wild: Coal Oil Point Natural Reserve. Short natural history films by Love include The Snowy Plover and You (2016), Devereux Slough (2017), Breakthrough (2016), The Western Snowy Plover: Natural History and Recovery (2016). Clients include University of California at Santa Barbara, Coal Oil Point Natural Reserve, US Fish and Wildlife Service, and the Cheadle Center for Biodiversity and Ecological Restoration.

== Teaching ==
From 1992 to 1999 Love was instructor for The American Film Institute's workshop The Final Draft, and Faculty Board Member of the AFI Professional Training Division. He has also been a lecturer in screenwriting at UCSB (2001, 2002) and Smith College.
