= The Nanny Reunion: A Nosh to Remember =

- Created by: Fran Drescher
- Written by: Frank Lombardi
- Directed by: Peter Marc Jacobson
- Starring: Fran Drescher; Renee Taylor; Charles Shaughnessy; Lauren Lane; Rachel Chagall; Ann Guilbert; Steve Lawrence; Nicholle Tom; Benjamin Salisbury; Madeline Zima
- Theme music composer: Ann Hampton Callaway
- Opening theme: "The Nanny Named Fran" by Ann Hampton Callaway
- Composer: Ann Hampton Callaway
- Country of origin: United States
- Original language: English

Production
- Executive producers: Fran Drescher; Gary Rosenthal
- Camera setup: Video camera
- Running time: 1 hour (60 min.)

Original release
- Network: Lifetime
- Release: December 6, 2004

The Nanny Reunion: A Nosh to Remember is a 2004 American television special that reunited the cast of the 1993–1999 sitcom The Nanny. It originally aired on Lifetime on December 6, 2004.

== Synopsis ==
The cast members reminisce about the show and present exclusive blooper footage never shown on television, as well as an update on their current activities.

The reunion took place at Fran Drescher's oceanside home in California. The entire cast was present except for Daniel Davis, who was performing in the musical La Cage aux Folles on Broadway at the time and was unable to attend. Also at the reunion were Drescher's mother and father, Sylvia and Morty, who made several appearances on the show.

In the special, Daniel Davis, or "Danny", was said by Drescher to have gotten "lost". At the end of the special, "Danny" (actually Danny Bonaduce), makes an appearance.

== Cast (in order of appearance) ==
- Fran Drescher
- Renée Taylor
- Steve Lawrence
- Charles Shaughnessy
- Lauren Lane
- Rachel Chagall
- Ann Morgan Guilbert
- Daniel Davis (cameo; flashback only)
- Nicholle Tom
- Madeline Zima
- Benjamin Salisbury

== Special guest ==
- Danny Bonaduce
