= The Simple Life (1998 TV series) =

- Genre: Sitcom
- Created by: Pamela Norris; Prudence Fraser; Robert Sternin; Herb Hamsher
- Starring: Judith Light; Florence Stanley; Brett Cullen; James Patrick Stuart; Ashlee Levitch; Ross Malinger; Eliza Dean
- Composer: Mark Mothersbaugh
- Country of origin: United States
- Original language: English
- No. of seasons: 1
- No. of episodes: 7 (1 unaired)

Production
- Executive producers: Prudence Fraser; Robert Sternin; Pamela Norris; Robbie Schwartz; Herb Hamsher
- Camera setup: Multi-camera
- Running time: 22 minutes
- Production companies: Sternin and Fraser Ink; CC Lyons Productions; Bell Prime Time; Columbia TriStar Television

Original release
- Network: CBS
- Release: June 3 – July 8, 1998

The Simple Life is an American sitcom television series starring Judith Light which aired on CBS from June 3 until July 8, 1998. The series stars Judith Light as a Martha Stewart-like TV star, who decides to move her TV show from Manhattan to a rustic farm in upstate New York.

== Premise ==
Judith Light stars in the series as Sara Campbell, the host of her own cooking show, who decides to leave Manhattan and move her show to a country farm. A divorcée, Sara moves her daughter Freddi and mother Muriel to rural upstate New York to live what she preaches — a simpler life. But as they soon learn, life there is anything but simple. Sara finds herself in constant conflict with foreman Luke Barton, who is raising his late sisters' son and daughter nearby.

CBS tried another show similar in content earlier in 1998 titled Style & Substance, starring Jean Smart as a lifestyle expert. It was cancelled after 5 episodes, while 7 more episodes were aired during the summer.

The Simple Life was co-created and produced by Prudence Fraser and Robert Sternin, who were then also producing the hit sitcom The Nanny for CBS as well. Sara was introduced as a former classmate of that series' lead character Fran Fine (Fran Drescher) and her sidekick Val Toriello (Rachel Chagall). They appeared in the pilot, while Fran's mother Sylvia (Renée Taylor) appeared in a separate episode.

== International broadcast and streaming ==
The series' rights are currently held by Sony Pictures Television, but is not available to stream on Crackle.

In Ukraine, the series previously aired on Antenna as Нью-Йорк: наше життя.

== Cast ==
=== Main ===
- Judith Light as Sara Campbell (née Lipschitz)
- Brett Cullen as Luke Barton, the foreman at Sara's farm
- Florence Stanley as Muriel Lipschitz, Sara's mother
- James Patrick Stuart as Greg Champlain, Sara's producer
- Ashlee Levitch as Frederica "Freddi" Campbell, Sara's daughter
- Ross Malinger as Will Barton, Luke's orphaned nephew
- Eliza Dean as Charlotte Barton, Luke's orphaned niece

=== Recurring ===
- Sara Rue as Melanie, an obsessive fan of Sara's who becomes her assistant
- Vasili Bogazianos as Nick, the stage manager of Sara's show
- Jeff Blumenkrantz as Jeff

=== Notable guest stars ===
- Fran Drescher as Fran Fine, Sara's high school classmate ("Pilot")
- Rachel Chagall as Val Toriello, Sara's high school classmate ("Pilot")
- Beverly Garland as Other Mother ("The Other Mother")
- Renée Taylor as Sylvia Fine ("The Other Mother")
- Jay Thomas as Joel Campbell, Sara's ex-husband ("Sara's Ex")
- Joseph Bologna as Philip Devine, the president of the network Sara's show airs on ("The Luke & Sara Show")

== Episodes ==
No.	Title	Directed by	Written by	Original release date	Prod. code
1	"Pilot"	Pamela Fryman	Pamela Norris & Prudence Fraser & Robert Sternin	June 3, 1998	100
Sara Campbell, a leading authority on homespun country living, decides to abandon her posh Manhattan digs to tape her do-it-yourself home show from a rustic, centuries-old farm in upstate New York.
2	"The Remodeling Show"	Ellen Gittelsohn	Pamela Norris	June 10, 1998	104
Sara kicks Luke out of his home when she decides to return the farm to its 18th-century charm. The gang discovers a gruesome secret about the original owner.
3	"The Church Supper"	Philip Charles MacKenzie	Pamela Norris & Robert Sternin & Robbie Schwartz	Unaired	101
Sara and Luke go to a church supper, where Sara participates in a pie-eating contest.
4	"The Other Mother"	Unknown	Rick Shaw	June 17, 1998	102
When Muriel refuses to talk about Sara's childhood on a TV show, Sara hires an actress to be her mother for the day.
5	"Sara's Ex"	Philip Charles MacKenzie	Wayne Lemon	June 24, 1998	105
Sara's ex-husband Joel (Jay Thomas) announces that he is writing a tell-all book.
6	"The Fly-Fishing Show"	Rod Daniel	Anne Lewis & Melanie Macfee	July 1, 1998	103
When Sara takes Luke and the kids on a fishing trip, she doesn't realize that her show is about to be cancelled.
7	"The Luke and Sara Show"	Dorothy Lyman	Story by : Pamela Norris; Teleplay by : Pamela Norris & Robert Sternin	July 8, 1998	106
The network president (Joseph Bologna) wants Luke to have an on-camera role.
