= Pamela Norris =

American screenwriter and producer

- Born: United States
- Education: Harvard College
- Occupation: Screenwriter

Pamela Norris is an American screenwriter and producer. She is best known for her work on the NBC sketch comedy series Saturday Night Live (1980–1984), and for co-writing the screenplay of the 1989 film Troop Beverly Hills. She was executive producer of the sitcom Designing Women, and The Huntress on USA Network. She was a Jeopardy! champion in December 1985, winning three games.

== Producer ==
- Designing Women (executive producer) 1991–1992
- Hearts Afire (co-executive producer) 1994–1995
- Mad About You (consulting producer) 1995–1996
- The Simple Life (executive producer) 1998
- The Huntress (executive producer) 2000–2001
- Emeril (consulting producer) 2000–2001

== Writer ==
- Saturday Night Live (TV series) 1980–1984
- It's Your Move (TV series) 1984–1985
- Remington Steele (TV series) 1985
- Misfits of Science (TV series) 1985
- Wayside School (TV short) 1986
- Gimme a Break! (TV series) 1985–1986
- The Ellen Burstyn Show (TV series) 1986
- Miami Vice (TV series) 1987
- Troop Beverly Hills (screenplay) 1989
- Designing Women (TV series) 1989–1991
- Hearts Afire (TV series) 1995
- The Simple Life (TV series) 1998
- Rude Awakening (TV series) 1998
- The Huntress (TV series) 2000–2001
- Emeril (TV series) 2001
- The Designing Women Reunion (TV documentary) 2003
- Ghost Whisperer (TV series) 2010
