= Rachel Chagall =

American retired actress (active 1987–2006)

- Born: Rachel Levin; New York City, New York, U.S
- Occupation: Actress
- Years active: 1987–2006
- Spouse: Greg Lenert
- Children: 2

Rachel Chagall (born Rachel Levin) is an American retired actress, best known for role as activist Gabriela Brimmer in the 1987 biographical drama film, Gaby: A True Story, for which she was nominated for Golden Globe Award for Best Actress – Motion Picture Drama. Chagall later played Val Toriello on the CBS sitcom The Nanny (1993–1999).

== Life and career ==
Chagall was born in New York City, New York and graduated from Goddard College. She made her stage debut at the age of 13 with the Israeli folk dance troupe. In 1982, she contracted Guillain–Barré syndrome, recovering sufficiently to be cast as activist Gabriela Brimmer in the 1987 biographical drama film, Gaby: A True Story directed by Luis Mandoki. The role gained her a nomination for the Golden Globe Award for Best Actress in a Motion Picture – Drama. In 1990, Chagall co-starred in the romantic drama film, White Palace also directed by Mandoki.

In 1993, Chagall was cast in the role as the dimwitted sidekick Val Toriello, on the CBS television sitcom The Nanny opposite Fran Drescher. The series ended in 1999. She made guest appearances on Just Shoot Me! and Strong Medicine. She also played a mysterious woman in What I Like About You. She also appeared in The Last Supper (1995). On December 6, 2004, Chagall appeared at the cast reunion for The Nanny, The Nanny Reunion: A Nosh to Remember. Chagall married stage producer Greg Lenert; they had twins.

== Filmography ==
Year	Title	Role	Other notes
1987	Gaby: A True Story	Gaby	Nominated: Golden Globe Award for Best Actress - Motion Picture Drama
1990	White Palace	Rachel	
1993–1999	The Nanny	Val Toriello	79 episodes
1995	The Last Supper	Abortion Activist	
1998	The Simple Life	Val Toriello	
2001	Odessa or Bust	Declining Agent	
2001	Just Shoot Me!	Aunt Mindy	"Sid & Nina"
2004	Strong Medicine	Renee Edwards	"Like Cures Like"
2004	The Nanny Reunion: A Nosh to Remember	Herself	
2006	What I Like About You	Chocolate Lady	"Now and Zen"
