= After the Promise =

1987 TV film directed by David Greene

- UK DVD cover
- Genre: Drama
- Screenplay by: Robert W. Lenski
- Story by: Sebastian Milito
- Directed by: David Greene
- Starring: Mark Harmon; Diana Scarwid; Rosemary Dunsmore; Donnelly Rhodes
- Music by: Ralph Burns
- Country of origin: United States
- Original language: English

Production
- Producer: Tamara Asseyev
- Cinematography: René Verzier
- Editor: Parkie Singh
- Running time: 90 minutes
- Production companies: Tamara Asseyev Productions; New World Television

Original release
- Network: CBS
- Release: October 11, 1987

After the Promise is a 1987 American drama television film directed by David Greene and written by Robert W. Lenski from a story by Sebastian Milito. Inspired by actual events, the film stars Mark Harmon, Diana Scarwid, Rosemary Dunsmore and Donnelly Rhodes. It aired on CBS on October 11, 1987, and received positive reviews.

== Plot ==
Elmer Jackson is a carpenter in a small Californian town in the 1930s. Struggling to bring up four young boys after the death of his wife, he is horrified when the government (citing trumped-up charges of parental neglect) places the boys into various foster homes and institutions, unaware of the abuse that the boys would then be subjected to. The conditions imposed by the court and the difficulties caused by the Depression make Jackson's determined and vigorous quest to find his boys extremely difficult.

== Cast ==
- Mark Harmon as Elmer Jackson
- Diana Scarwid as Anna Jackson
- Rosemary Dunsmore as Florence Jackson
- Donnelly Rhodes as Dr. Northfield
- David French as Richard Jackson (age 10)
- Don Jeffcoat as Richard Jackson (age 12)
- Andrew Woodworth as Richard Jackson (age 15)
- Benjamin Turner as Ellis Jackson (age 8)
- Ryan Heavenor as Ellis Jackson (age 10)
- Trey Ames as Ellis Jackson (age 13)
- Chance Michael Corbitt as Wayne Jackson (age 6)
- Ryan Francis as Wayne Jackson (age 8)
- Dick Billingsley as Wayne Jackson (age 11)
- Lance and Gary Verwoerd as Raymond Jackson (age 3)
- Slone Romano as Raymond Jackson (age 5)
- Mark Hildreth as Raymond Jackson (age 8)

== Reception ==
After the Promise received positive reviews from critics. The film was nominated for two Golden Globes Awards in the category of Best Miniseries or Motion Picture Made for Television and Best Performance by an Actor in a Miniseries or Motion Picture Made for Television for Mark Harmon. The film was also nominated for two Young Artist Awards in the categories of Best Family TV Special and Best Young Actor/Actress Ensemble in a Television Comedy, Drama Series or Special.
