= The Designing Women Reunion =

- Written by: Allen Crowe; Pamela Norris; Effie Belford
- Directed by: Harry Thomason
- Starring: Dixie Carter; Annie Potts; Delta Burke; Jean Smart; Meshach Taylor
- Music by: Bruce Miller
- Opening theme: "Georgia on My Mind"
- Country of origin: United States
- Original language: English

Production
- Executive producers: Harry Thomason; Linda Bloodworth
- Producer: Douglas G. Jackson
- Editor: Leo Papin
- Running time: 90 minutes
- Production companies: Elmo Productions; Sony Pictures Television

Original release
- Network: Lifetime
- Release: July 28, 2003

Related
- Designing Women

The Designing Women Reunion is a 2003 American television special that reunited the cast of the 1986–1993 sitcom Designing Women. It originally aired on Lifetime on July 28, 2003.

== Summary ==
A retrospective of Designing Women reunites original cast members Dixie Carter, Annie Potts, Delta Burke, Jean Smart, and Meshach Taylor after 12 years. They reminisce on their time together on the series and about their characters. The special includes a compilation of the show's memorable moments, including initial casting, favorite episodes, how the women met their real-life husbands on the show, and Burke discussing her battle with depression and panic attacks prior to her departure from the series.

Also featured are a special appearance by Alice Ghostley, new interviews with crew members and series creators/producers Linda Bloodworth-Thomason and Harry Thomason, recurring cast members Hal Holbrook, Richard Gilliland, Gerald McRaney, and writer/executive producer Pamela Norris sharing her memories of the show in pre-recorded separate interviews.

The special was taped on June 4, 2003, in front of a live audience at CBS Studio Center in Studio City, California.

== Cast ==
=== Main cast ===
- Dixie Carter
- Annie Potts
- Delta Burke
- Jean Smart
- Meshach Taylor

=== Guest stars ===
- Alice Ghostley
- Linda Bloodworth-Thomason

=== Interviews (pre-recorded) ===
- Hal Holbrook
- Richard Gilliland
- Gerald McRaney
- Pamela Norris

== Reception ==
The Designing Women Reunion was the second highest-rated special in Lifetime network's 19-year history, averaging a 3.1 household rating (3.3 million viewers) during its premiere on July 28, 2003. The first was The Golden Girls: Their Greatest Moments, which scored a 3.7 rating with 4.2 million viewers the previous month.

The "Designing Women" evening on Lifetime from 7:00 to 11:00 p.m., which included an intimate portrait of Delta Burke, the 90-minute reunion special, the pilot episode, and two episodes of Designing Women especially selected by the cast, was seen by an estimated 9.7 million viewers.
