= Ann Morgan Guilbert =

American actress (1928–2016)

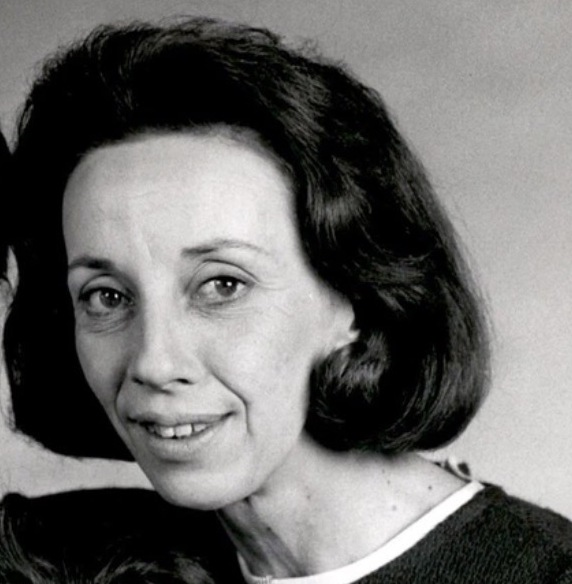
- Guilbert in The New Andy Griffith Show, 1971
- Born: October 16, 1928; Minneapolis, Minnesota, U.S.
- Died: June 14, 2016 (aged 87); Los Angeles, California, U.S.
- Other name: Ann Guilbert
- Occupations: Actress, comedian
- Years active: 1952–2016
- Height: 5 ft 1 in (155 cm)
- Spouses: George Eckstein (m. 1951; div. 1966) Guy Raymond (m. 1969; died 1997)
- Children: 2, including Hallie Todd

Ann Morgan Guilbert (October 16, 1928 – June 14, 2016), sometimes credited as Ann Guilbert, was an American television and film actress and comedian who portrayed a number of roles from the 1950s on, most notably as Millie Helper in 61 episodes of the early 1960s sitcom The Dick Van Dyke Show, and later Yetta Rosenberg, Fran Fine's doddering grandmother, in 56 episodes of the 1990s sitcom The Nanny.

== Life and career ==
Guilbert was born in Minneapolis, Minnesota, the daughter of Gerald Guilbert, a physician, and his wife, Cornelia (née Morgan). Her paternal grandfather, Lionel Guilbert, was an immigrant from England.

She attended Solomon Juneau High School in Milwaukee, Wisconsin, and after moving to California, studied theater arts at Stanford University. She began her career as a featured performer and singer in the Billy Barnes Revues of the 1950s and 1960s.

After The Dick Van Dyke Show, she made guest appearances in many other television shows, including Adam-12 (the premiere episode); as well as The Andy Griffith Show; Love, American Style; That Girl; I Dream of Jeannie; Dragnet; The Love Boat; Picket Fences; Cheers; Seinfeld; Curb Your Enthusiasm; Law & Order: Special Victims Unit, and Life in Pieces. From 1993 to 1999, she appeared as Yetta Rosenberg on The Nanny. In December 2004, she appeared in the reunion of The Nanny titled The Nanny Reunion: A Nosh to Remember with Fran Drescher and other cast members of The Nanny.

== Personal life ==
Guilbert was married to writer and producer George Eckstein from 1951 until their divorce in 1966. They had two children together, actress Hallie Todd and acting coach Nora Eckstein. Her second marriage, to Guy Raymond, lasted from 1969 until his death in 1997.

== Death ==
Guilbert died of cancer in Los Angeles on June 14, 2016, aged 87. An episode of Life in Pieces was dedicated to her memory.

== Filmography ==
=== Film ===
| Year | Title | Role | Notes |
|---|---|---|---|
| 1962 | Two for the Seesaw | Molly | |
| 1963 | The Man from the Diners' Club | Ella Trask | |
| 1964 | One Man's Way | Mrs. Grayle | |
| 1967 | A Guide for the Married Man | Technical Advisor (Charlie's Wife) | |
| 1968 | How Sweet It Is! | Bibi | |
| 1969 | Viva Max! | Edna Miller | |
| 1995 | Grumpier Old Men | Francesca 'Mama' Ragetti | |
| 1998 | Sour Grapes | Mrs. Drier | |
| 2010 | Please Give | Andra | |

=== Television ===
| Year | Title | Role | Notes |
|---|---|---|---|
| 1961 | My Three Sons | Verna Foster | Season 1 Episode 28: "Unite or Sink" |
| 1961–1966 | The Dick Van Dyke Show | Millie Helper | Recurring role (61 episodes) |
| 1962 | You're Only Young Once | Connie Fletcher | TV film |
| 1963 | The Alfred Hitchcock Hour | The Pet Shop Proprietress | Season 2 Episode 11: "How to Get Rid of Your Wife" |
| 1966 | Hey, Landlord | Mrs. Henderson | Season 1 Episode 1: "Pursuit of a Dream" |
| 1966 | Hey, Landlord | Mrs. Henderson | Season 1 Episode 11: "Divorce, Bachelor Style" |
| 1967 | 'Good Morning World | Harriet Hatfield | Season 1 Episode 3: "You vs. Me" |
| 1967 | The Andy Griffith Show | Ella | Season 8 Episode 13: "Aunt Bee's Cousin" |
| 1967 | Dragnet 1967 | Marnie Prout | Season 2 Episode 5: "The Big Neighbor" |
| 1968 | Adam-12 | Ruth Elkins | Season 1 Episode 1: "Log 1: The Impossible Mission" |
| 1969 | I Dream of Jeannie | Thelma Crawford | Season 4 Episode 21: "Jeannie for the Defense" |
| 1969 | Room 222 | Mrs. Garrett | Season 1 Episode 10: "Fathers and Sons" |
| 1970 | Dragnet 1967 | Bessie McDermott | Season 4 Episode 14: "Burglary: Helpful Woman" |
| 1970 | Love, American Style | | Season 2 Episode 7 (Segment: "Love and the Decision") |
| 1971 | The D.A.: Conspiracy to Kill | Martha Grimes | TV film |
| 1971 | The New Andy Griffith Show | Nora | Supporting role (10 episodes) |
| 1971 | The Partridge Family | Mrs. Bruner | Season 2 Episode 4: "The Undergraduate" |
| 1971 | Love, American Style | Mrs. Manfried | Season 3 Episode 11 (Segment: "Love and the Tuba") |
| 1972 | Second Chance | Charlene | TV film |
| 1972 | Emergency! | Woman in Trouble | Season 1 Pilot Episode: "The Wedsworth-Townsend Act" |
| 1972 | Emergency! | Tilly Meers / Cora | Season 2 Episode 9: "Women" |
| 1973 | Chase | Mae Monroe | Episode: "Pilot" |
| 1974 | Emergency! | Cora | Season 4 Episode 6: "Surprise" |
| 1975 | The Ghost Busters | The Witch | Season 1 Episode 8: "Which Witch Is Which?" |
| 1975 | On the Rocks | Mrs. Palik | Season 1 Episode 8: "Dear John" |
| 1976 | Maude | Mathilda | Season 4 Episode 16: "Walter's Stigma" |
| 1976 | Amelia Earhart | Esther Biddles | TV miniseries |
| 1981 | Barney Miller | Ms. Swallock | Season 8 Episode 5: "Stress Analyzer" |
| 1989 | Cheers | Marge Thornhill | Season 7 Episode 20: "Call Me, Irresponsible" |
| 1989 | Newhart | Aunt Bess | Season 7 Episode 20: "Georgie and Bess" |
| 1990 | Murder, She Wrote | Harriet De Vol | Season 6 Episode 17: "Murder: According to Maggie" |
| 1990–91 | The Fanelli Boys | Theresa Fanelli | Main role (19 episodes) |
| 1991 | Blossom | Elizabeth | Season 2 Episode 11: "You Can't Go Home" |
| 1991 | Seinfeld | Evelyn | Season 3 Episode 3: "The Pen" |
| 1991, 1993 | Empty Nest | Mama Todd | Season 4 Episode 8: "Windy" |
| 1992–1994 | Picket Fences | Myriam Wambaugh | Recurring role (Seasons 1–3) (5 episodes) |
| 1993 | Empty Nest | Mama Todd | Season 6 Episode 4: "Mama Todd, the Sequel" |
| 1993 | Home Improvement | Wilson's Mother | Season 2 Episode 23: "To Build or Not to Build" |
| 1993–1999 | The Nanny | Yetta Rosenberg | Recurring role (56 episodes) |
| 1996 | Seinfeld | Evelyn | Season 7 Episode 14: “The Cadillac” |
| 2004 | The Dick Van Dyke Show Revisited | Millie Helper | TV film |
| 2005 | Curb Your Enthusiasm | Lenore | Season 5 Episode 4: "Kamikaze Bingo" |
| 2007 | State of Mind | Faye Fleischman | Season 1 Episode 4: "Passion Fishing" |
| 2007 | Law & Order: Special Victims Unit | Church lady | Season 9 Episode 1: "Alternate" |
| 2012 | Happily Divorced | Myrna | Season 2 Episode 4: "The Burial Plotz" |
| 2012 | Friend Me | Mrs. Nesbitt | Season 1 Episode 8: "Evan Is Now Friends with Vrementashen" |
| 2012 | Before We Made It | Lily | TV film |
| 2013 | Modern Family | Grams | Season 5 Episode 8: "ClosetCon '13" |
| 2013–2015 | Getting On | Birdy Lamb | Recurring role (15 episodes) |
| 2014 | The Winklers | Chef | TV film |
| 2015 | Grey's Anatomy | Gabby Margraff | Season 12 Episode 4: "Old Time Rock and Roll" |
| 2016 | Life in Pieces | Gigi | Season 1 Episode 15: "Soccer Gigi TV Mikey" |
| 2016 | Life in Pieces | Gigi | Season 1 Episode 22: "CryTunes Divorce Tablet Ring" |
| 2016 | Life in Pieces | Gigi | Season 2 Episode 3: "Eyebrow Anonymous Trapped Gem" (uncredited) |

== Stage ==
| Year | Title | Role | Notes |
|---|---|---|---|
| 1959 | Billy Barnes Revue | performer | Broadway debut |
| 2000 | Touch the Names | performer | |
| 2002 | Play Yourself | Selma | |
| 2005 | A Naked Girl on the Appian Way | Sadie | |
