= The Huntress (TV series) =

- Based on: The Huntress by Christopher Keane
- Developed by: Pamela Norris
- Starring: Annette O'Toole; Jordana Spiro; Luis Antonio Ramos; James Remar; Michael Muhney
- Composer: Frankie Blue
- Country of origin: United States
- Original language: English
- No. of seasons: 1
- No. of episodes: 28 + pilot film

Production
- Executive producer: Pamela Norris
- Producer: Scott White
- Running time: 60 minutes
- Production company: Off Line Entertainment Group (pilot); C.C. Lyons Productions; Chelsey Avenue Productions; Studios USA Television

Original release
- Network: USA Network
- Release: July 26, 2000 – September 9, 2001

The Huntress is an American crime drama television series that aired for one season of 28 episodes on the USA Network, from July 26, 2000, to September 9, 2001. It was developed by Pamela Norris, and based on the 1996 biography of the same name by Christopher Keane about bounty hunter Dottie Thorson, played by Annette O'Toole. Dottie was the widow of bounty hunter Ralph "Papa" Thorson, the subject of the 1980 Steve McQueen film The Hunter. After Ralph's murder, Dottie and their daughter Brandi (Jordana Spiro) team up as bounty hunters. Luis Antonio Ramos, James Remar, and Michael Muhney also star. The series was preceded by a two-hour pilot episode, which aired on USA as a stand-alone television film on March 7, 2000.

== Plot ==
After she loses her husband to a car bomb, newly widowed Dottie Thorson and her daughter Brandi team up to pick up where her husband Ralph left off, to hunt down criminals that operate above the law.

== Cast ==
- Annette O'Toole as Dottie Thorson
- Jordana Spiro as Brandi Thorson
- Luis Antonio Ramos as Ricky Guzman
- James Remar as Tiny Bellows
- Michael Muhney as Mark Farrell

== Episodes ==
No.	Title	Directed by	Written by	Original release date
0	"The Huntress/Pilot"	Jeffrey Reiner	Teleplay by : Bruno Heller	March 7, 2000
1	"What Ralph Left Behind"	Jeffrey Reiner	Pamela Norris	July 26, 2000
2	"The Kid"	Adam Nimoy	Doug Jung	August 2, 2000
3	"Springing Tiny"	Sandy Smolan	Michael McKean & Annette O'Toole	August 9, 2000
4	"Scattered"	Unknown	Story by : Pamela Norris; Teleplay by : Bruno Heller	August 16, 2000
5	"Surprise Party"	Unknown	Pamela Norris	August 23, 2000
6	"Bad Boys & Why We Love Them"	Unknown	Bruno Heller	September 13, 2000
7	"Kidnapped"	Unknown	Bruno Heller	September 20, 2000
8	"Partners"	Unknown	Gerry Conway	September 27, 2000
9	"Black Widow"	Unknown	Pamela Norris	January 7, 2001
10	"The Two Mrs. Thorsons: Part 1"	Unknown	Gerry Conway	January 14, 2001
11	"The Two Mrs. Thorsons: Part 2"	Unknown	Gerry Conway	January 21, 2001
12	"Smartest Guy in the World"	Unknown	Story by : Pamela Norris & Gerry Conway; Teleplay by : Bruno Heller	February 4, 2001
13	"Run Ricky Run"	Unknown	Larry Brody	February 11, 2001
14	"Generations"	Unknown	Gerry Conway	February 18, 2001
15	"Who Are You?"	Unknown	Tracey Forbes	February 25, 2001
16	"Family Therapy"	Unknown	Story by : Melissa Blake; Teleplay by : Michael Traeger	March 4, 2001
17	"Busted"	Unknown	Chris Black	June 3, 2001
18	"Undercover"	Unknown	Christopher Keane	June 10, 2001
19	"Ah, Wilderness"	Unknown	Gerry Conway & Chris Black	June 17, 2001
20	"Spooked"	Unknown	Story by : Pamela Norris; Teleplay by : Melissa Blake	June 24, 2001
21	"Diva"	Unknown	Pamela Norris	July 1, 2001
22	"Showdown"	Unknown	Gerry Conway	July 8, 2001
23	"Now You See Him"	Unknown	Chris Black	July 15, 2001
24	"Basic Maternal Instinct"	Unknown	Story by : Scott Murphy; Teleplay by : Jack Bernstein	July 22, 2001
25	"With Great Power"	Unknown	Story by : Gerry Conway; Teleplay by : Gerry Conway & Chris Black	July 29, 2001
26	"The Quest: Part 1"	Unknown	Story by : Gerry Conway & Chris Black; Teleplay by : Chris Black	August 12, 2001
27	"The Quest: Part 2"	Unknown	Story by : Gerry Conway & Chris Black; Teleplay by : Gerry Conway	August 19, 2001
28	"D&B, Inc."	Unknown	Jack Bernstein	September 9, 2001

== Production ==
The pilot was filmed in Salt Lake City, Utah. The series was filmed on location in and around Los Angeles and in Santa Clarita, California. In the pilot, Brandi was played by Aleksa Palladino. For the series, the role was recast with Jordana Spiro.
