= Interface (film) =

- Directed by: Andy Anderson
- Written by: Andy Anderson; Anne Marie Biondo; Steven Jay Hoey; John Williamson
- Screenplay by: John Williamson
- Story by: Andy Anderson; John Williamson
- Produced by: Melissa Gatchel North
- Starring: John S. Davies; Lauren Lane; Matthew Sacks; Michael Hendrix
- Cinematography: Leighton McWilliams; Roger Pistole
- Music by: David Hoey; Steven Jay Hoey
- Production company: Filmworks
- Distributed by: Vestron Video
- Release date: 1984
- Country: United States
- Language: English

Interface is a 1984 American science fiction comedy horror film, starring John Davies, Lauren Lane and Mathew Sacks. It was Lou Diamond Phillips's first film role, as Punk #1. Primarily directed by Andy Anderson, Interface was a production of Anderson's film program at the University of Texas at Arlington. The film was scripted, acted, and initially directed entirely by UTA students.

== Plot ==
The film takes place on a fictional college campus. Davies, starring as a professor, discovers a secret society of masked hackers on campus; they seemingly kill his star pupil. Hobson attempts to uncover and neutralize the society, even as he himself becomes a suspect in his student's death.
