= The Golden Girls: Their Greatest Moments =

- Written by: Andrew Solt; Greg Vines
- Directed by: Andrew Solt
- Starring: Bea Arthur; Rue McClanahan; Betty White
- Music by: Richard Friedman; Tony Hodson; Cory Lerios
- Opening theme: "Thank You for Being a Friend"
- Country of origin: United States
- Original language: English

Production
- Executive producers: Andrew Solt; Greg Vines
- Producers: Barry Kaplan; Mary Sherwood
- Editors: Ernie Hornberger; Leslie Tong
- Running time: 90 minutes
- Production companies: Andrew Solt Productions; Lifetime Productions

Original release
- Network: Lifetime
- Release: June 2, 2003

Related
- The Golden Girls

The Golden Girls: Their Greatest Moments is a 2003 American television special that reunited the cast of the 1985–1992 sitcom The Golden Girls. It originally aired on Lifetime on June 2, 2003.

== Summary ==
Bea Arthur, Rue McClanahan and Betty White reunite to co-host a retrospective of The Golden Girls. Estelle Getty, who had retired from show business, was unable to participate due to failing health.

The special features a montage of clips from the women's favorite episodes and musical moments from the show, never-before-seen bloopers and outtakes, behind-the-scenes footage, as well as interviews with executive producers Paul Junger Witt and Tony Thomas, and creator/writer Susan Harris.

The women also introduce clips focused on their individual characters and comment on their character's specific traits and quirks. During the special, Bea Arthur pays tribute to actor Herb Edelman, who played the recurring role of her character's ex-husband Stanley Zbornak during the series' seven-year run. A new version of the show's theme song "Thank You for Being a Friend" was recorded for this special.

== Cast ==
=== Principal cast ===
- Bea Arthur
- Rue McClanahan
- Betty White

=== Guest stars ===
- Paul Junger Witt
- Tony Thomas
- Susan Harris

== Reception ==
The Golden Girls: Their Greatest Moments became the highest-rated special in Lifetime network's 19-year history, averaging a 3.7 household rating (4.2 million viewers) during its premiere on June 2, 2003; the second was The Designing Women Reunion which scored a 3.1 rating with 3.3 million viewers when it aired the following month.

The six-hour "Golden Girls" event on Lifetime from 6:00 p.m. to 12 midnight, which included the 90-minute reunion special, the pilot episode, the one-hour series finale and additional favorite episodes of The Golden Girls, was seen by an estimated 15 million viewers.

Lifetime subsequently rebroadcast the special on December 15, 2003 and again on November 12, 2005 to commemorate the show's 20th anniversary.
