= Daniel Davis (actor) =

American actor (born 1945)

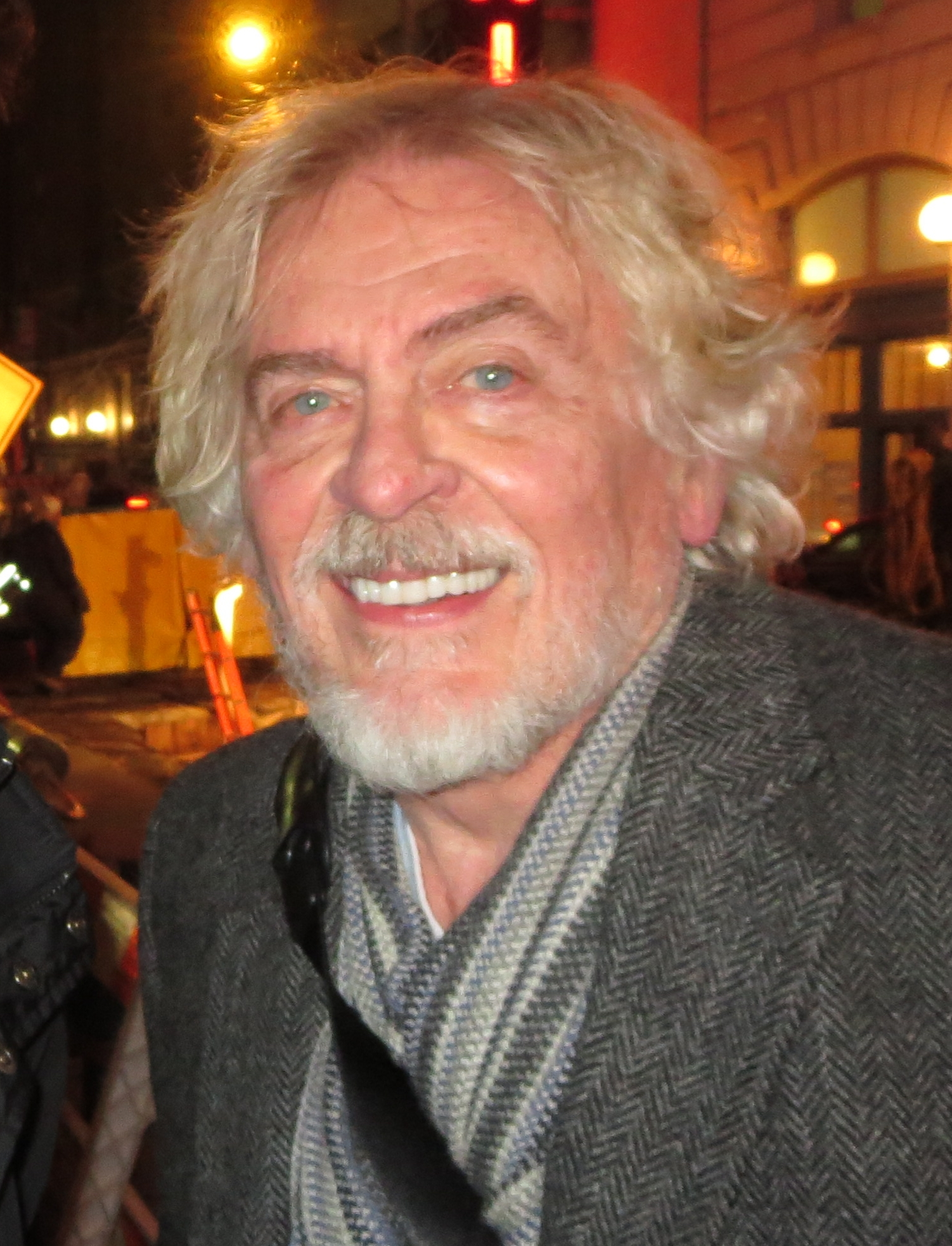
- Davis in 2016
- Born: November 26, 1945 (age 80); Gurdon, Arkansas, U.S.
- Other name: Danny Davis
- Occupation: Actor
- Years active: 1970–present

Daniel Davis (born November 26, 1945) is an American film, stage and television actor. He portrayed Niles the butler on the sitcom The Nanny (1993 to 1999) and had two guest appearances as Professor Moriarty on Star Trek: The Next Generation (a role he reprised on Star Trek: Picard), affecting a received pronunciation English accent for both roles.

== Early life and education ==
Davis was born on November 26, 1945, in Gurdon, Arkansas, and grew up in Little Rock. His parents operated a cinema. His first acting job was at the age of 11, when he was cast in a local broadcast program, Betty's Little Rascals.

Davis graduated from Hall High School in Little Rock in 1964. He graduated from the Arkansas Arts Center with a Bachelor of Fine Arts, followed by work with the Oregon Shakespeare Festival, the Stratford Shakespeare Festival, and six years with the American Conservatory Theater (ACT). During his time at ACT, he taught acting classes.

== Career ==
=== Television and film ===
Davis first became popular in daytime television playing opposite Beverlee McKinsey as her character Iris Cory's former (and presumed dead) husband, Elliot Carrington, on the soap opera Texas, a spin-off of Another World, from October 1980 to December 1981. In 1985, he played a renegade soldier in the Season 4 episode, "The Doctor is Out", of the television series The A-Team.

Davis played his most famous character, Niles the Butler, on the television series The Nanny throughout its run from 1993 to 1999. Niles was known for his frequent use of deadpan one-liners, usually insulting character C. C. Babcock, with whom Niles eventually fell in love and married in the series' last season.

His natural accent is Southern American; however, his English dialect as Niles was so accurate that many viewers thought he was actually English. He also used an English received pronounced dialect as Professor Moriarty in the Star Trek: The Next Generation episodes "Elementary, Dear Data" and "Ship in a Bottle". However, as the commanding officer of the aircraft carrier USS Enterprise in the 1990 film The Hunt for Red October, Davis spoke with his own American dialect.

In 2002, Davis guest-starred on the television series Frasier, playing Dr. Shafer in Season 10, Episode 8, "Rooms with a View".

Davis was among the group of celebrities lip-synching to the Bee Gees' Stayin' Alive on the "Idol Gives Back" episode of American Idol on April 25, 2007.

He appeared briefly in the 2006 film The Prestige, directed by Christopher Nolan.

In 2008 he guest-starred on the television series Ugly Betty.

In December 2010, he appeared on The Fran Drescher Show through Skype.

In 2012, he recorded the audiobook of the Star Wars novel Star Wars: Darth Plagueis, by James Luceno.

Davis reprised the role of Professor Moriarty in the third and final season of Star Trek: Picard.

=== Theatre ===
Davis is an established theatre actor. He has appeared in both Broadway and off-Broadway productions in New York, and has appeared at the Guthrie Theater in Minneapolis, Minnesota.

His first Broadway role was as Antonio Salieri in Amadeus in 1980.

Off-Broadway, he played Rubin in Lake No Bottom in 1990, the Duke of Buckingham in The Tragedy of Richard III, and he starred as Gaev in The Cherry Orchard in 2011.

In 2000, Davis was nominated for a Best Featured Actor Tony Award for his role in David Hirson's Broadway play Wrong Mountain. He played Oscar Wilde in The Invention of Love in 2001. In 2003, he appeared in the Alan Bennett play Talking Heads. In 2004, he portrayed George Bernard Shaw in the Stephen Sondheim musical The Frogs. He co-starred in La Cage Aux Folles with Gary Beach from November 2004 to March 2005. (Reportedly, he clashed frequently with Beach and others. He was eventually replaced by Robert Goulet.)

In 2007, Davis was a member of the cast of an audio production of the play Blue/Orange, in which he took the part of Dr. Robert Smith.

In July 2008, he portrayed King Lear at the Shakespeare Theatre of New Jersey, under the direction of Bonnie J. Monte.

In November 2010, Davis was part of the Celebrity Autobiography series at the Long Center for the Performing Arts in Austin, Texas. He performed along with fellow Nanny alum Lauren Lane and Ugly Betty alum Michael Urie.

In 2012, he played Prospero in The Tempest at Hartford Stage.

In 2015, Davis starred in a one-off performance of A. R. Gurney's Love Letters co-starring with Lane. Proceeds were donated to the Texas State BFA Acting Program.

In 2016, he appeared on Broadway as Selsdon Mowbray in the Roundabout Theatre revival of Noises Off at the American Airlines Theatre.

== Filmography ==
=== Film ===
Year	Title	Role	Notes
1970	The Sidelong Glances of a Pigeon Kicker	Skinny	Uncredited
1985	Chain Letters	Steve	
1989	K-9	Halstead	
1990	The Hunt for Red October	Captain Charlie Davenport	
1990	Havana	Marion Chigwell	
2005	Thru the Moebius Strip	Arthur (voice)	
2006	The Prestige	Judge	
2018	Roses are Blind	Addison Spelling	

=== Television ===
Year	Title	Role	Notes
1974	Great Performances	Moulineaux	Episode: "In Fashion"
1980–1981	Texas	Eliot Carrington	71 episodes
1983	Hardcastle and McCormick	Joe Kello	Episode: "The Day the Music Died"
1984	Cagney & Lacey	Arthur Cole	Episode: "Lady Luck"
1984	Highway to Heaven	Lance Gaylord	Episode: "Catch a Falling Star"
1985	Remington Steele	Pierre Fumar	Episode: "Gourmet Steele"
1985	Scarecrow and Mrs. King	Robert Castille, Tony Martinet	2 episodes
1985	The A-Team	Phillips	Episode: "The Doctor Is Out"
1985	The Eagle and the Bear	Underhill	Television film
1986	Blind Justice	Seth Thompson	Television film
1986	George Washington II: The Forging of a Nation	Patrick Henry	Television film
1986	Matlock	James Billings	Episode: "The Professor"
1986	Cheers	Mr. Reinhardt	Episode: "The Peterson Principle"
1986	Tall Tales & Legends	Congressman	Episode: "Davy Crockett"
1987	Dynasty	Harry Thresher	5 episodes
1987	The Spirit	Simon Teasdale	Television film
1988	Frank's Place	Arnold Tuney	Episode: "Frank's Place - The Movie"
1988	The Equalizer	Eddie Mason	Episode: "Video Games"
1988	What Price Victory	Trainer	Television film
1988–1993	Star Trek: The Next Generation	Professor James Moriarty	2 episodes
1989	MacGyver	Nicholas Helman	Episode: "Halloween Knights"
1991	Palomino	Doctor	Television film
1991	She Stood Alone	Parker Elsworth	Television film
1991	The Perfect Tribute	Gov. Curtin	Television film
1992	Columbo	Alex Varrick	Episode: "No Time to Die"
1992	Civil Wars	Harvey Gutfruend	Episode: "Tape Fear"
1992	L.A. Law	C. Howard Grady	Episode: "Love in Bloom"
1992	Murder, She Wrote	Neal Dishman	Episode: "Badge of Honor"
1993–1999	The Nanny	Niles	145 episodes
1996	Aaahh!!! Real Monsters	Lugo (voice)	Episode: "Lifestyles of the Rich and Scary"
1996	Adventures from the Book of Virtues	Horse, Schoolmaster Dobbins (voice)	Episode: "Work"
1997	Duckman	Rodney (voice)	Episode: "Duckman and Cornfed in 'Haunted Society Plumbers'"
1997	Remember WENN	Desmond Quist	Episode: "Eugenia Bremer, Master Spy"
1999	Rugrats	Conan McNulty (voice)	Episode: "Wrestling Grandpa"
2000	The Practice	Judge Barton Wolfe	3 episodes
2000	What a Cartoon!	Longhair (voice)	Episode: "Longhair and Doubledome: Good Wheel Hunting"
2002	Frasier	Dr Shafer	Episode: "Rooms With A View"
2008	Ugly Betty	Dr. Morgan Remus	Episode: "Burning Questions"
2015	Gotham	Jacob Skolimski	Episode: "Under the Knife"
2017	The Blacklist	Baldur Magnusson	Episode: "Natalie Luca"
2019	Elementary	Antoine LaGrange	Episode: "The Price of Admission"
2019	The Good Fight	Professor Harrison	Episode: "The One About the End of the World"
2022	New Amsterdam	Vic Wallace	Episode: "Castles Made of Sand"
2023	Star Trek: Picard	Professor James Moriarty	Episode: "The Bounty"
2024	Elsbeth	Dr. Yablonsky	2 episodes
