= 25×5: the Continuing Adventures of the Rolling Stones =

1990 documentary film

25x5: The Continuing Adventures of the Rolling Stones is a 1990 documentary featuring rock group the Rolling Stones, charting the period between the band's formation in 1962 and the release of its then latest album, 1989's Steel Wheels. It was directed by acclaimed British documentary-maker Nigel Finch.

Alongside much archive footage, the film also featured extensive original interviews with band members Mick Jagger, Keith Richards, Bill Wyman, Charlie Watts and Ronnie Wood. The band's two guitarists who preceded Ronnie Wood, Brian Jones and Mick Taylor are featured in archive interviews only. Jones died in 1969 and Taylor, his replacement, left in 1974.

The film was transmitted on British TV as part of the Arena arts documentary strand. Despite the high regard the film is held in, it is currently unavailable on DVD or Blu-ray.

== Track listing ==
Songs listed are not presented in full

- Interview with Mick Jagger (USA, autumn 1989)
- Interview with Keith Richards (USA, autumn 1989)
- Interview with Charlie Watts (USA, autumn 1989)
- "You Better Move On" - The Arthur Haynes Show 7 February 1964
- Interview with Brian Jones (Belfast 6 January 1965; taken from UTV Six Five)
- Interview with Bill Wyman (USA, autumn 1989)
- "Little Red Rooster" - Ready Steady Go! 20 November 1964
- "Around and Around" - Hull 21 September 1964
- "Mercy Mercy" - Richmond 7 August 1964
- "I Just Want to Make Love to You" - The Hollywood Palace 3 June 1964
- "Carol" - Scheveningen 8 August 1964
- "Time Is on My Side" - The Ed Sullivan Show 25 October 1964
- Interview with Mick Jagger, Keith Richards, Bill Wyman and Charlie Watts (Fort Wayne 12 November 1964)
- Interview with Mick Jagger and Brian Jones (Shindig!, US TV 20 May 1965)
- "How Many More Years" - Shindig! 20 May 1965
- "The Last Time" - Shindig! 20 May 1965
- Interview with Tony King (USA, autumn 1989)
- "(I Can't Get No) Satisfaction" - Shindig 28 July 1965
- "(I Can't Get No) Satisfaction" - The Ed Sullivan Show 13 February 1966
- "19th Nervous Breakdown" - The Ed Sullivan Show 13 February 1966
- "Have You Seen Your Mother, Baby, Standing in the Shadow?" - London 23 September 1966
- "Paint It Black" - The Ed Sullivan Show 11 September 1966
- Interview with Mick Jagger (Ongar, UK Granada TV World in Action, 31 July 1967)
- "Let's Spend the Night Together" - The Ed Sullivan Show 15 January 1967
- "You Can't Always Get What You Want" - Rock and Roll Circus, 11 December 1968
- Interview with Bill Wyman (ca. 1974, BBC TV All You Need Is Love series)
- Interview with Keith Richards (Sydney Airport, 9 February 1973)
- Eulogy for Brian Jones - Hyde Park, London, 5 July 1969
- "Honky Tonk Women" - Hyde Park, London, 5 July 1969
- Interview with Ronnie Wood (USA, autumn 1989)
- Wedding of Mick Jagger and Bianca Perez (St. Tropez 12 May 1971)
- Footage from the unreleased documentary Cocksucker Blues
- Interview with Alan Dunn (USA, autumn 1989)
- Interview with Bill Wyman (New York 25 July 1972, from US TV The Dick Cavett Show)
- Interview with Mick Jagger (New York 25 July 1972, from US TV The Dick Cavett Show)
- "Brown Sugar" - Fifth Avenue, New York, 1 May 1975 (dubbed sound)
- "Star Star" - Paris 6 June 1976, part only
- "Star Star" - Knebworth 1976
- "Before They Make Me Run" - Largo 5 May 1979
- "Mannish Boy" - Chicago 22 November 1981, part only
- "(I Can't Get No) Satisfaction" - Hampton 18 December 1981, part only
- Interview with Charlie Watts (Hertfordshire, Elstree Studios 1 or 2 May 1986)
- "Just Another Night" - Melbourne 15 October 1988
- "Take It So Hard" - Los Angeles 15 December 1988
- Rock and Roll Hall of Fame induction ceremony (Waldorf-Astoria Hotel, New York, 18 January 1989)
- "Mixed Emotions" rehearsal - AIR Studios, Montserrat, April 1989
- Wedding of Keith Richards and Patti Hansen (Cabo San Lucas, 18 December 1983)
- Wedding of Ron Wood and Jo Howard (Denham, 2 January 1985)
- Wedding of Bill Wyman and Mandy Smith (London, 5 June 1989)
- Plus footage from promos, newscasts and movies throughout the years
