= List of The Nanny characters =

The Nanny is an American television sitcom which originally aired on CBS from 1993 to 1999, starring Fran Drescher as Fran Fine, a fashion queen from Flushing, New York who becomes the nanny of three children from the New York/British high society.

== Main characters ==
=== Fran Fine ===
Fran Fine
- First appearance: "The Nanny" (November 3, 1993)
- Last appearance: "The Finale: Part 2" (June 23, 1999)
- Created by: Peter Marc Jacobson; Fran Drescher
- Portrayed by: Fran Drescher

In-universe information
- Nickname: "Miss Fine"
- Gender: Female
- Occupation: Nanny (up to season 6); Shop assistant Bridal consultant Housewife (since season 6)
- Family: Morty Fine (father); Sylvia Fine (mother); Nadine Cooperman (older sister)
- Spouse: Maxwell Sheffield
- Children: Margaret Sheffield (stepdaughter/adopted daughter); Brighton Sheffield (stepson/adopted son); Grace Sheffield (stepdaughter/adopted daughter); Jonah Samuel Sheffield (son); Eve Catherine Sheffield (daughter)
- Relatives: Yetta Rosenberg (maternal grandmother); Nettie Fine (paternal grandmother); Jack Rosenberg (maternal uncle); Freida Fine (paternal aunt); Cookie (aunt); Marilyn (aunt); Rose (aunt); Stanley (uncle)

Francine Joy "Fran" Sheffield (née Fine) is the series' nasal-voiced, big haired protagonist, portrayed by actress Fran Drescher. Her character is bubbly, outgoing, and humorous but also caring and responsible of the kids and her job, and plays the mother figure for them. Fran frequently gets into trouble, but usually solves the problems herself through seemingly ridiculous antics or by relying on her street smarts. She was a fashion icon in the show, often wearing black turtlenecks, or clothes right off the runway (even though her salary couldn't afford them in real life). Her closeness with the Sheffield family leads to a growing romantic relationship with Maxwell, which becomes official in Season 5. In the last season Fran and Maxwell have twins; a boy and a girl named Jonah and Eve. Also, in the last episode, Fran, Maxwell, Grace, along with Niles, C.C., Sylvia, Morty, Yetta, Val, and Fred move from New York to California.

==== Early life ====
The youngest daughter of Sylvia and Morty Fine, Fran was raised in Flushing, Queens with her older sister Nadine. Her Jewish ancestors immigrated to the United States via Ellis Island, and anglicized their name to Fine.

Fran and her best friend Val Toriello (Rachel Chagall) attended Hillcrest High School. After graduating from high school, Fran attended cosmetology college while working as a foot model. She later worked in the bridal dress shop of her boyfriend, Danny, after being 'pre-engaged' for three-years. At the start of the series, Fran was dumped as girlfriend and employee by her boyfriend and resorted to selling cosmetics door-to-door.

==== Relationship with the Sheffield family ====
In the show's pilot episode, Fran arrives at the home of Broadway producer Maxwell Sheffield (Charles Shaughnessy), hoping to sell cosmetics. Patriarch Maxwell Sheffield happens to be in need of a nanny to take care of his three children: Margaret "Maggie" Sheffield, the oldest (Nicholle Tom); the youngest, Grace "Gracie" (Madeline Zima); and the somewhat bratty middle sibling, Brighton (Benjamin Salisbury). Niles, the butler, mistakenly thinks Fran has come to apply for the open nanny position. Fran decides to apply for the position and shows Mr. Sheffield her references, which are written in lipstick. Max ultimately realizes that Fran did not come there for the nanny position but he is desperate and hires Fran after she shows an aptitude with Maxwell's three high-maintenance children, who have driven away all previous nannies. Fran, with her nontraditional nurturing style and no-nonsense honesty, soon becomes a favorite with the kids as well as Maxwell, as they come to respect her opinions and love her as a person.

==== Romance ====
Regretting her past breakup with her boyfriend Danny, Fran often feels the need to date. Fran is desperate to find a soulmate and often tries to date Jewish men. This compelling desire mainly comes from the obsessive, overbearing nature of her mother, Sylvia, who often nags Fran about the subject of marriage.

As she continues to work for Mr. Sheffield, Fran develops many fantasies about being romantically and sexually involved with him, such as the two kissing passionately. In one episode, a drunk Fran accidentally climbs in bed alongside a sleeping Max. Upon waking up to find herself in bed next to Max, she says, "I'm havin' that dream again." In the last episode of season 3, Maxwell confesses to Miss Fine that he loves her when their plane from Paris to New York meets some turbulence, and he believes they may crash. Upon returning home, Maxwell immediately revokes the remark, claiming it was based more on panic and the possibility of death, while also being a spontaneous response, and was something he wanted to tell her before they perished. This incident is later referred to as "The Thing" and is held over Mr. Sheffield's head with glee by both Fran and Niles (Daniel Davis) his butler for almost a whole season.

In the beginning seasons, they always address each other with proper employer-employee politeness, i.e., "Miss Fine" and "Mr. Sheffield". (In the traditional British fashion of addressing butlers or ladies' maids, Maxwell calls Niles only by his surname.) By the fifth season, Mr. Sheffield and Miss Fine begin a tentative romantic relationship (they also have two dates but neither go so well; the first one where Fran inadvertently offends Elton John, and the second one where it's discovered that Fran has a squash allergy), which consists of a very large milestone: calling each other by their first names. The romantic tension between them lasts until the middle of the fifth season, when the couple are engaged. Maxwell proposes marriage and, following several snafus, they are finally married in the season 5 finale. Fran gives birth to fraternal twins, Jonah Samuel and Eve Catherine, in the series finale. Jonah, being named for Fran's side of the family, is more reserved like Maxwell. Eve, being named for Maxwell's side of the family, is more nasal and boisterous like Fran.

Despite the fact that they stop using each other's last names to address each other when they become engaged, at times Fran and Max still switch to their boss/employee roles out of habit. When Max is angry with her, he will instinctively shout "Miss Fine!", causing a worried Fran to reply, "Oh no, I'm 'Miss Fine' again!" The same is true for Fran, who sometimes calls Maxwell "Mr. Sheffield" during intimate moments in the bedroom. When she and Maxwell finally become a couple, Fran sometimes exclaims "Oh, Mr. Sheffield" when they kiss.

==== Running gags ====
- Fran's voice – Fran has a nasal voice, and a heavy Queens dialect. Apparently, Fran has unique or deformed adenoids. Many comments are made by characters in reference to the distinctive voice, which is often found annoying to most of her peers. Whether Fran herself is aware of this is inconsistent throughout the series – sometimes she is oblivious her voice is different, but in other episodes she is aware of the effect of her voice on others and jokes about it. The sound of Fran's voice is a very frequent gag on the show, with Fran sometimes even referencing it by noting how some other people get recognized because of their unique voice.
- Fran's obsession with Barbra Streisand (and other celebrities) – On several occasions, Fran has alluded to her belief that Barbra Streisand is God, or at least the Messiah, claiming that if her mother and Barbra were both drowning, she would save her mother because "Barbra can walk on water." Fran has had many opportunities to meet Streisand or see her perform, often being foiled by plot devices – most notably severe Braxton Hicks contractions in the season 6 episode "Maggie's Wedding." Fran did meet Streisand in the season 4 episode "The Car Show," when Mr. Sheffield faked food poisoning to encourage her to overcome a fear of driving. Fran makes quite an impression on Barbra by going through Barbra's personal things, as she does whenever the opportunity presents itself, and pilfering a purse and single shoe.
- Fran's dating life – Fran will often jump at any chance of meeting a man, due to her compulsive desire to get married, brought on by her loving though overbearing mother, Sylvia. Based on her Jewish background, Fran's most ideal attraction is toward Jewish men, preferably doctors, which is often shown whenever a man makes a cultural reference such as having a Jewish name or celebrating events such as Bar Mitzvahs. All of her relationships until Max become unsuccessful, even though Fran is obsessed with having an extended relationship. These disappointments are resolved by her psychologist, Dr. Miller (Spalding Gray). With the ending of a relationship, Fran often bounces back to her growing relationship with Maxwell Sheffield, a pattern about which they both seem to be totally oblivious until later seasons. Despite marrying a gentile herself, Fran is overjoyed when she learns that the male model whom her (now) step-daughter, Maggie, is dating, and later marries, is Jewish (long before realizing that his cousin-in-law is her idol, Barbra Streisand).
- Fran's age – Fran often tries to expand her youth by lying about her age, particularly when it comes to men. Fran is quick to say that she is in her late twenties but she was really in her early to mid 30s throughout the series. However, she is extremely defensive to anybody who comes close to assuming any age that refers to middle age. Her age is such a secret, in fact, that even the FBI cannot figure it out. However, in season 3, Fran's age was revealed to be somewhat older than 33 when Val mentioned that Fran is older than she is and Val admits that she herself is 33. Just before Fran's wedding, Fran says she was born during President Kennedy's administration. Nonetheless, she has indirectly revealed her age in some instances throughout the series including in a season 5 episode in 1998 where she claims to her boyfriend that she's 34. In addition, she celebrated her 30th birthday in a season 1 episode and when questioned by her mother in a season 3 episode about the amount of time it will take for her to get back her figure after giving birth to a child, she answers "I don't know Ma. 32 years?" Therefore, her birth year would most likely be 1964 (which is during the time of President Johnson's administration and not President Kennedy's, although as a matter of fact it would have been if Kennedy had not been assassinated in November 1963) and her age upon marrying Maxwell was 34 (which would make her nigh-10-years-younger than Maxwell). In reality, Fran Drescher was 36 at the beginning of the series.
- Fran's extended family – Fran typically brings up her family members. One episode had her make several references to "Cousin Toddy", who's revealed to be fashion designer Todd Oldham, and appeared as himself.
- Fran's food preference – Though Jewish, Fran is very open about her and her family's love of non-kosher food. She often notes how bacon is one of her favorite food choices, and rather enjoys other non-kosher foods such as lobster, ribs, pizza with meat toppings, pork, ham, ham and cheese sandwiches, hog dogs, etc.

=== Maxwell Sheffield ===
Maxwell Sheffield
- First appearance: "The Nanny" (November 3, 1993)
- Last appearance: "The Finale Part 2" (June 23, 1999)
- Created by: Peter Marc Jacobson; Fran Drescher
- Portrayed by: Charles Shaughnessy

In-universe information
- Gender: Male
- Occupation: Broadway producer
- Family: James Sheffield (father; deceased); Elizabeth Sheffield (mother); Joan Sheffield (stepmother); Nigel Sheffield (brother); Jocelyn Sheffield (sister); Maria de la Concepcion Bustilla Garcia del Amo Sheffield (paternal half-sister)
- Spouses: Sara Sheffield (deceased); Fran Sheffield
- Children: Margaret Sheffield (daughter with Sara); Brighton Milhouse Sheffield (son with Sara); Grace Sheffield (daughter with Sara); Jonah Samuel Sheffield (son with Fran); Eve Catherine Sheffield (daughter with Fran)
- Relatives: Rupert (cousin); Bill (uncle); Eloise Sheffield (paternal grandmother)

Maxwell Beverley "Max" Sheffield is the male lead and patriarch of the family, portrayed by actor and British peer Charles Shaughnessy. Maxwell is a Broadway theatrical producer of some success, although he seems to remain in the shadow of his main rival, Andrew Lloyd Webber. His backstory is established as including an education at Eton College, where he was House President and a classmate of Jeremy Irons (though Eton has House Captains, not House Presidents, and Jeremy Irons was not educated at Eton but at Sherborne School). Max is always irritated that he turned down producing the shows Tommy, Hair, and especially Cats, which proved to be a financial windfall for Andrew Lloyd Webber. It was revealed in the episode "The Kibbutz" that his business partner, C.C. Babcock (who was his secretary at the time), was the one who convinced him to turn down Cats all those years ago.

Maxwell's wife, Sara, died some years before the start of the series and he has worked closely with C.C. (who had her eyes set on becoming the next Mrs. Sheffield) for almost 20 years.

Maxwell's busy schedule does not allow him to spend much time with Maggie, Brighton, and Gracie Sheffield so he had to find a nanny; enter Fran Fine. He is overprotective of Maggie, not wanting her to date.

Although Maxwell does not himself hold an aristocratic British title at any point in the series, it is once said that he is the first prominent Sheffield man in generations to not be a titled peer or knight, so it is safe to assume that he comes from a historically upper class family with a history of title holding. (Ironically, Shaughnessy would become the 5th Baron of the City of Montreal in the Dominion of Canada and of Ashford in the County of Limerick in 2007.)

Despite mutual attraction, Maxwell and Fran try to keep their relationship professional. Maxwell is nervous about commitment and is mourning his deceased wife, while Fran is still reeling from a broken relationship with ex-boyfriend Danny, whom she almost marries again in a later episode.

After a lot of stumbling, Maxwell commits to Fran and confesses his true feelings, and he and Fran get married in the fifth season of the series. The engagement causes the jealous C.C. to have a nervous breakdown and she spends time in a mental hospital. After being released, she continues her maniacal attempts to separate Max and Fran, even placing a veil on her head at the wedding, and taking Max's arm to walk down the aisle, much to Max's bemusement. She is eventually removed from the aisle by Niles, the butler, and forced into a seat.

On the eve of his wedding to Fran, Maxwell's late wife, Sara, appears to him. Sara reveals that she was the one who brought Fran into his life so she could become the nanny. When asked what she thought of Fran's voice, she states, "I thought she had a cold!"

Maxwell becomes a father again when Fran gives birth to their twins Jonah Samuel and Eve Catherine Sheffield. After the birth, the whole family moves to California, where Maxwell is scheduled to produce a TV show in Los Angeles.

His age ranges from 39 to 46 as he mentioned that he was 42 years old in "That's Midlife." He also stated that he was 44 years old in "The Nose Knows".

In the episode "The Nanny Behind the Man," Maxwell identifies himself to be a Republican and admits that his middle name is "Beverley".

=== Maggie Sheffield ===
Margaret Isabella "Maggie" Brolin (née Sheffield) is the eldest child of Maxwell Sheffield, portrayed by Nicholle Tom. In Fran Drescher's first book, Enter Whining, Drescher explains that the character was added late in the show's development, after a network executive suggested "A shy teenager would be a funny contrast to a brazen and flashy Fran."

At first, Maggie is shy and awkward, and despairs that no boy will ever fall for her. She was forever bickering with her brother, Brighton, who felt that she was a nerd. Her relationship with her youngest sister, Grace, was one as a mentor. When Fran was hired as the new nanny, Maggie and Fran bonded almost instantly. Under Fran's patient tutelage, Maggie blossomed from a shy and awkward teenager to a somewhat popular young woman.

Maxwell tended to smother Maggie, discouraging her from any kind of activities with boys, wanting her to remain his little girl. When Fran and her father married, Maggie was one of her maids-of-honor. She also bonded well with Fran's mother, Sylvia, and grandmother, Yetta.

Eventually, Maggie met and married a handsome, Jewish underwear model named Michael Brolin (Andrew Levitas), who was related, by marriage, to Barbra Streisand. In the final episode, Maggie and her husband move to Europe, but Maggie stays in Paris with Brighton while Michael travels to Venice for a modeling shoot.

=== Brighton Sheffield ===
Brighton Milhouse Sheffield is the middle child and the oldest son of Maxwell Sheffield, portrayed by Benjamin Salisbury.

Because both his older and younger siblings are sisters, he feels like he is often left out and squabbles with the pair, causing trouble for his sisters. Despite this, he was also very sensitive. Brighton initially did not want to like Fran when she first arrived, having disliked all his previous nannies. However, he liked Fran's down-to-earth and witty personality. Brighton also bonded with Fran's mother, Sylvia, after joining a canasta league together.

Brighton's ambition was to become a Broadway producer, like his father. During the later seasons, Brighton obsessed about his trust fund, or possible lack of one. During the final season, he was accepted into Harvard University, but chose to take a year off to travel in France.

=== Grace Sheffield ===
Grace "Gracie" Sheffield is the youngest child in the Sheffield family, portrayed by actress Madeline Zima. Grace has a habit of using complicated words and terms that others can't understand, as well as naming medical conditions.

The close bond between Grace and Fran begins when Grace travels to Flushing on Fran's day off because she misses her. While there, Grace attends her first Jewish wedding.

When Fran came to the Sheffield home, Grace was seeing a therapist. When Grace "lost" her imaginary friend, her therapist revealed it was because Grace felt that Fran was filling the hole that had been there since her mother died. As Grace matured, Fran and Grace became even closer, and Grace adopted some of Fran's slang and dressing habits.

While all the Sheffield children are okay with Fran's and Maxwell's relationship, Grace is the only one to actively support it, often scheming with Fran, Niles, or some combination thereof to get Maxwell to fall in love with her. Also, she states in several occasions that she looks up to Fran and wishes she was her stepmother, which finally happens in the fifth season.

Grace's age is not consistent throughout the series. In the season 2 episode "Everybody Needs a Bubby" (September 1994), Maxwell mentions that Grace is seven years old, but in the season 3 episode "The Grandmas" (January 1996), Grace tells Fran she's ten years old. Grace mentions to Fran when the latter is reminiscing about the November 1989 fall of the Berlin Wall, that she was "only four" when the Wall fell and so can't share Fran's nostalgia – potentially consistent with her age of ten in "The Grandmas".

=== C.C. Babcock ===
Chastity Claire Babcock is a business associate of Maxwell and the antagonist of the series, portrayed by actress Lauren Lane. She is referred to as "C.C." throughout the series, with her full name only being revealed in the series finale.

C.C. comes from wealth like Maxwell, and has worked with him for almost 20 years. Maxwell has a long-lasting rivalry with Andrew Lloyd Webber, which was started when C.C. convinced Maxwell to pass on the opportunity to produce the musical Cats. C.C. harbors an intense crush on Maxwell and tries to move in on him after his first wife died; Maxwell, however, remains seemingly oblivious to C.C.'s advances. When Fran comes to work as the new nanny, C.C. immediately views her as a threat. Once Maxwell and Fran become engaged, C.C. plunges into depression, gains weight, loses her sanity, and has to be institutionalized for three months (a plot line written to coincide with Lane's real-life pregnancy). Under duress, C.C. eventually realizes that her feelings for Maxwell are unreciprocated, and decides to re-evaluate her life.

C.C. is typically portrayed as a functioning alcoholic, as well as egocentric, mean-spirited, tactless, a snob, and uncaring. She is particularly shown to be uncaring in her inability to remember the names of Maxwell's children Maggie, Brighton, and Grace, whom she usually refers to as "the big one", "the boy", and "the little one", or by incorrect first names. She always addresses Fran as "Nanny Fine", even after Fran marries Maxwell and becomes the lady of the household. She has a keen mind for business and is happy to wheel and deal to get Maxwell and herself money and success.

C.C.'s main opponent is Niles, the Sheffields' butler. Niles has supposedly despised her from the start, and frequently makes quips at her expense. However, from the middle of the series and onward, C.C. and Niles show sympathy for each other, feeling depressed when they cannot attack each other. However, when Niles suffers a mild heart attack, C.C. seems to be devastated until he regains consciousness. After refusing to marry Niles multiple times, a relationship later forms when C.C. realizes Niles is the one for her. C.C. later accepts Niles' proposal, gets married as Fran gives birth, and by the end of the series, they learn that they are expecting a child.

=== Niles ===
Niles is the butler and chauffeur for the Sheffield family, portrayed by Daniel Davis. He is of British descent. He is strategic, loyal, tireless, caring, and protective of the Sheffield household, and especially loyal to his friend, Fran. Despite this, he is known for his manipulative attitudes and being a pretty deadpan snarker, and would often make clever, sarcastic, and sometimes insulting remarks. Niles' father had been the butler for Maxwell Sheffield's father, and Niles and Maxwell have known each other all their lives.

After Sara Sheffield's death, Maxwell's business partner C.C. Babcock, descended upon him to woo Maxwell into marrying her. Four years later Maxwell hires Fran Fine as the new nanny for the children, Niles bonds with Fran right away. To Niles, Fran is a breath of fresh air, bringing life back in the house, which it had been lacking since Sara died.

Niles is known as the household snoop. He is always caught listening to the intercom, "cleaning" keyholes, and conveniently cleaning rooms where important conversations are being held. As the all-seeing butler, Niles is known for manipulating events to ensure that Maxwell is not shortchanging Fran or others. He is also known for "overhearing" things that are not meant for him to hear. On more than one occasion, Maxwell has addressed a question to Niles while seemingly alone in an empty room, secure in the knowledge that his butler is nearby and listening. He gains a friendship with Sylvia, Fran's mother, and always makes sure something is available for her to eat.

Niles is part of a butlers' association and is sometimes jealous of others' butlers. In one episode, two members of the National Butlers' Association interview Niles to determine if he has the right qualities to join the association.

Until later seasons, Niles outright hates C.C., and makes it his mission to torment her at every opportunity, calling it "a hobby". The insults Niles gives to C.C. usually poke fun at her supposedly advanced age, subtly comparing her to a dog or a witch, her inability to date anyone, and her vanity, though C.C. will occasionally get the better of him, usually by mentioning that she is responsible for his retirement fund. He constantly encourages the romantic tension between Fran and Maxwell, and helps undermine C.C.'s constant attempts to sabotage their relationship and growing feelings for each other. Even though Niles despises C.C., the mutual rage between the butler and C.C. turns to lust or even love that keeps growing from the middle of the series onward, to the point that they both find themselves depressed without each other. Niles later reveals that his insults toward C.C. are a defensive form of flirting. Taking advice from Fran, Niles admits his love for C.C. and proposes. Appalled at the thought of marrying someone so far below her station, C.C. flatly turns him down several times. Later, after an argument, both C.C. and Niles tell Maxwell they are quitting, but are later discovered in bed together by Fran and Max. Neither Niles nor C.C. quits, and they carry on a "secret" relationship (known, of course, to just about every member of the extended Sheffield-Fine clan). Later in the series, after becoming trapped in an elevator with Fran (who is in labor with her twins), C.C. breaks down and accepts Niles' proposal through the closed doors. C.C. and Niles marry in the series finale, as Fran is giving birth to twins. After they are pronounced husband and wife, C.C. learns that she is pregnant with their first child, which causes both of them to faint.

=== Sylvia Fine ===
Sylvia Fine (née Rosenberg), is the mother of Fran Fine, portrayed by actress Renée Taylor, and in early seasons by Fran Drescher (in flashbacks to Fran Fine's childhood).

With her husband Morty (Steve Lawrence), the couple has 2 daughters, Nadine & Fran (Sylvia and Morty are also the names of Fran Drescher's real-life parents). Considered the stereotypical Jewish mother, Sylvia offers overbearing guidance, has a voracious appetite (she claims to be "Hippo-glycemic"), and always tries to maintain an important and prevalent role in her daughter's life. Sylvia usually appears as a supporting character to whatever outrageous goings-on are happening in Fran's life, with several ersatz events occurring at Sylvia and Morty's home. She frequently pushes for Fran to get married and have a family of her own, at times setting Fran up with various men to date. She is a more frequently practicing Jew, and it is noted how she attends a Reform temple. However, like her daughter, Sylvia also is seen to enjoy non-kosher food.

Sylvia bonds well with Maxwell's children and visits the Sheffield home (and eats their food) frequently. After becoming the step-grandmother to Maxwell's children, she became a grandmother to Fran and Maxwell's children, Jonah Samuel and Eve Catherine. Sylvia also has two granddaughters from Nadine's marriage. Initially when the family was moving to California, Sylvia and Morty were going to stay behind in New York, but in the finale they went to live in California with the Sheffields.

=== Grandma Yetta ===
Yetta Rosenberg-Jones or Grandma Yetta (Yetta in Yiddish means "light") Fran's grandmother and the mother of Sylvia and Uncle Jack. The character was played by actress Ann Morgan Guilbert. Yetta is based on Drescher's real-life grandmother.

Yetta, who lives in a retirement home, is frequently seriously forgetful. She often visits Fran at the Sheffield's home and incorrectly assumes Fran and Maxwell are married and that the three children are Fran's, and that Maxwell is having an affair with C.C. She also had a habit of mistaking the opening sequences of old TV shows for memories or psychic visions.

In one of the episodes, it is revealed that Yetta had a romantic affair with a waiter on the boat to Ellis Island, but she was to marry a different man. Her love letters from this period were adapted by Maxwell into a hit musical (one of his few successes). Yetta's first husband, Shlomo (sometimes referred to as Joe), choked on a chicken bone and died in 1973. Yetta later finds love with a man named Sammy (Ray Charles) and soon marries him.

The earlier life of Yetta, however, remains a mystery. Yetta and Fran sometimes mention different events in Yetta's life and all of the "facts" together paint it as one of the most interesting stories in the whole series. Yetta came to the United States on a boat from Romania, and she married Joe. She then probably went back to Europe and traveled back and forth between the two continents, ending up on the Titanic. She survived the tragedy and it is assumed that she went back to Europe again. In one of the episodes, she says that on her and her husband's anniversary, they fled Poland (an event probably connected to the Second World War). The next place she mentions that she visited was Hawaii. She tells Fran that the fireworks were wonderful at which Fran pauses and asks if it happened on December 7, 1941, clearly referencing the attack on Pearl Harbor. Yetta then settled in the United States and had two children. She disappeared some time after Sylvia grew up and reappeared again when Fran was a girl. Fran tells this to Mr. Sheffield, saying that Yetta came "out of Europe with a dining table strapped to her back."

When Fran, who has finally married Maxwell, and her new family move to California from New York, Yetta joins them. She also bonds with Maxwell's three children from his first marriage. In the last season, she welcomes her biological great-grandchildren, Jonah and Eve Sheffield.

=== Valerie Toriello ===
Valerie "Val" Toriello is the best friend of Fran, portrayed by Rachel Chagall. Val has been Fran's best friend since attending high school together in Flushing, Queens, New York. When the show began, Val had been working at the bridal shop with Fran. Val is of Italian descent and notes in at least one episode that she is Catholic.

Val is often portrayed as a loser who still lives with her parents and is often at home at night. People are genuinely surprised whenever she has a boyfriend.

Val occasionally has moments of intelligence, but generally makes outright dimwitted remarks, much to the annoyance and worries of Fran. Her dim-wittedness often annoys The Sheffields, Niles, C.C., Sylvia and Yetta. When she and Val disagree, Fran at times uses Val's (lack of) intelligence as an insult.

Like Fran, Val is unable to find success in love. However, near the end of the series, Val begins dating a pharmacist named Fred. She and Fred move to California along with the Sheffields.
