= Florencia Sánchez Morales =

Mexican caregiver of Gabriela Brimmer (1923–2018)

Florencia Sánchez Morales (1923–2018) was a Mexican woman known for being the caretaker of writer and activist Gabriela Brimmer.

Morales' life story was told in the film Gaby: A True Story, in which she was portrayed by Argentine actress Norma Aleandro. Aleandro was nominated for the Academy Award for Best Supporting Actress for her performance as Morales. Her life story was also chronicled in the book Gaby Brimmer: An Autobiography in Three Voices, written by Elena Poniatowska. The book is told in contrasting narratives by Gabriela Brimmer, her mother Sari Brimmer, and Morales.

== Early life ==
Morales was born in Santa Maria Maquixco, Temascalapa, Mexico, in 1923, the daughter of Lorenzo Morales and Candelaria Sanchez. Her father was a farm laborer and her parents were of Indigenous Mexican ancestry. She had nine siblings, including her sister Maria, and her family was poor. Her mother encouraged Morales and her siblings to go to Mexico City to find work. She had extended family already working in Mexico City, including her cousin Petra, and when she first arrived she held odd jobs. She began working as a maid for a rich family, who had their staff living in poor conditions. After a year, Morales quit the job and moved back home. She said she needed to regain her strength because she was not healthy. After a year of regrouping, Morales, now in her late 20s, went back to Mexico City, and she was referred to the Brimmer family, who was looking for hired help.

== Life with Gaby Brimmer ==
Morales began taking care of Gabriela Brimmer when Brimmer was five years old. She was originally hired in 1949 as a maid by her parents, Sari and Michel Brimmer, who were Jewish-Austrian and living in Mexico after moving there as refugees from Europe during World War II. Morales was credited for helping Brimmer develop better communication skills so she could live a healthier life and begin to write. Morales was described as an "extra leg" for Brimmer during her life. Morales traveled with Gaby when she was living in the United States undergoing testing and procedures in an attempt to cure her cerebral palsy. Morales lived with Betty and Otto Modley, the aunt and uncle of Gaby, who lived in San Francisco. Later they settled back in Mexico City where Gaby began writing and pursuing her education. Gaby Brimmer longed to become a mother, so she adopted a girl and Gaby named her after Florencia, Alma Florencia Brimmer. Morales was then in charge of not only taking care of Gaby, but also Gaby's daughter. The three lived in a home together until Brimmer's death in 2000.

== Legacy ==
The story of Gabriela Brimmer became famous in the 1970s in Mexico, which prompted a book and film to be made about her life. Brimmer helped establish an organization titled ADEPAM, dedicated to the care of and rights for people with disabilities. Morales served as President of ADEPAM in the 1990s. In 2000, after Brimmer's death, an award was established by Mexican president Ernesto Zedillo titled the National Rehabilitation Gaby Brimmer Award. The very first award was given to Florencia as a thank you for her selfless and dedicated service in taking care of those with disabilities. Morales never married or had children, and had dedicated her life to take care of the Brimmer family.

== Portrayal in media ==
In the mid 1980s, Mexican director Luis Mandoki became aware of the story of Gabriela Brimmer and Florencia Sanchez-Morales, and became determined to make the story into a feature-film. He wrote, directed, and produced Gaby: A True Story, released in 1987. Acclaimed Argentinian actress Norma Aleandro portrayed Florencia.

The New York Times wrote: "As the film presents this, the nurse, Florencia Morales, was largely responsible for teaching Gaby to communicate...Miss Aleandro is a marvel, conveying both the shyness and the meddlesomeness of someone living in so symbiotic a situation". Aleandro was nominated for the Academy Award and Golden Globe for her performance as Florencia.
