= Gaby: A True Story =

- Film video cover
- Directed by: Luis Mandoki
- Written by: Martin Salinas; Michael James Love
- Produced by: Pinchas Perry
- Starring: Liv Ullmann; Norma Aleandro; Robert Loggia; Lawrence Monoson; Rachel Levin
- Narrated by: Norma Aleandro
- Cinematography: Lajos Koltai
- Edited by: Garth Craven
- Music by: Maurice Jarre
- Distributed by: Tri-Star Pictures
- Release date: October 30, 1987
- Running time: 114 minutes
- Countries: Mexico; United States
- Language: English
- Budget: $5,000,000 (est.)
- Box office: $125,400

Gaby: A True Story is a 1987 biographical drama film directed by Luis Mandoki. An international co-production of Mexico and the United States, it stars Rachel Chagall (who, at the time, was billed under her birth name, Rachel Levin), Norma Aleandro, Liv Ullmann, and Robert Loggia. Written by Michael Love and Martín Salinas, the film chronicles the lives of Gabriela Brimmer, a Mexican writer and disability rights activist, and her caretaker, Florencia Sánchez Morales.

== Synopsis ==
The story chronicles the life of Gaby Brimmer, the child of Austrian Jewish refugees living in Mexico, who is born with cerebral palsy. Though most of her body is completely paralyzed, her mind and left foot are unaffected, so that she becomes a college graduate and an acclaimed author.

== Cast ==
- Rachel Chagall as Gabriela Brimmer (billed as Rachel Levin)
- Norma Aleandro as Florencia Sánchez Morales
- Liv Ullmann as Sari Brimmer, Gaby's mother
- Robert Loggia as Michel Brimmer, Gaby's father
- Susana Alexander as Dr. Betty Modley, Sari's sister and Gaby's aunt
- Lawrence Monoson as Fernando
- Robert Beltran as Luis
- Beatriz Sheridan as Fernando's mother
- Tony Goldwyn as David

== Release ==
The film was released in the United States on October 30, 1987. In the Philippines, the film was released on June 2, 1988.

=== Critical response ===
Janet Maslin of The New York Times said the film was blunt and unsentimental, and praised Aleandro very highly.

== Award nominations ==
Award	Category	Nominee	Result	Ref.
Academy Awards	Academy Award for Best Supporting Actress	Norma Aleandro	Nominated	
Casting Society of America	Best Casting – Motion Picture Drama		Nominated	
Golden Globe Awards	Best Actress – Motion Picture Drama	Rachel Chagall	Nominated	
Golden Globe Awards	Best Supporting Actress – Motion Picture	Norma Aleandro	Nominated	
