= The Fran Drescher Show =

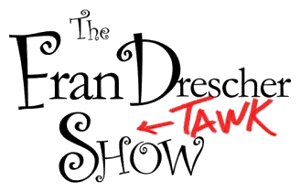
- Also known as: The Fran Drescher Tawk Show
- Presented by: Fran Drescher
- Composer: Rami Jaffee
- Country of origin: United States
- Original language: English
- No. of seasons: 1
- No. of episodes: 16

Production
- Executive producers: Fran Drescher; Peter Marc Jacobson; Scott Sternberg
- Producers: Christopher Miele; A.J. Lewis
- Production locations: Sunset Bronson Studios, Hollywood, California
- Cinematography: Terry Clark; Bart Ping; Ricky Johnson; David Ortiz; Shane Harness; Kevin Michel
- Camera setup: Multiple
- Running time: 42 minutes
- Production companies: Uh Oh Productions; Scott Sternberg Productions

Original release
- Network: Syndication
- Release: November 26 – December 17, 2010

The Fran Drescher Show (also called The Fran Drescher Tawk Show) is an American talk show hosted by actress Fran Drescher. The series premiered on November 26, 2010, in six cities on Fox owned stations: New York on WNYW, Los Angeles on KTTV, Philadelphia on WTXF, Phoenix on KSAZ, Minneapolis on KMSP and Orlando on WOFL. The Fran Drescher Show was given a three-week trial run with the option of being nationally syndicated. In its debut, the program placed a 0.8 rating/2 share in six metered markets. With declining ratings throughout its run, the show did not return.

== Background ==
Drescher described what she would bring to the program: "I'm thrilled to be able to bring The Fran Drescher Tawk Show to daytime TV, which fits me hand in glove," and added that "It will cover all of my passions, everything from pedicures to politics. America will have a chance to see the real Fran Drescher, beyond The Nanny. I'm the girl next door, a self-made woman who has been to hell and back a few times." The house band on the show was led by Foo Fighters and Wallflowers member Rami Jaffee.
