= Gabriela Brimmer =

Mexican writer and activist (1947–2000)

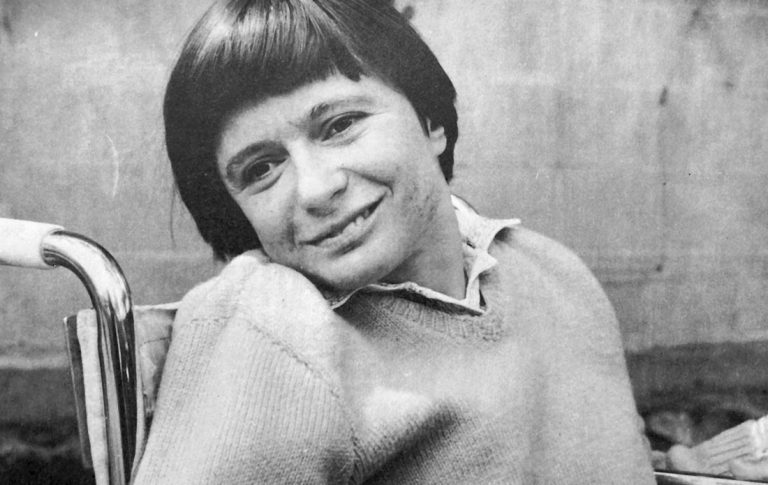
- Born: Gabriela Raquel Brimmer; September 12, 1947; Mexico City, Mexico
- Died: January 3, 2000 (aged 52); Mexico City, Mexico
- Citizenship: Mexico
- Occupations: Writer, activist

Gabriela "Gaby" Raquel Brimmer (September 12, 1947 – January 3, 2000) was a Mexican writer and activist for people with disabilities. She was born in Mexico City, the daughter of Sari and Michel Brimmer, Austrian Jewish immigrants. She had a brother, David. Gaby was born with cerebral palsy and since childhood learned to act in a world that has difficulty accepting diversity. Brimmer's caretaker Florencia Sánchez Morales was largely responsible for teaching her to communicate. Brimmer's life was chronicled in the film Gaby: A True Story. In 1979, her Spanish-language autobiography Gaby Brimmer, coauthored by Elena Poniatowska, was published by Editorial Grijalbo in Mexico City. An English version translated by Trudy Balch appeared in 2009.

== Education and early life ==
Brimmer was born in September 12th, 1947 to an Austrian-Jewish family that fled Nazi Germany. In 1955, she was enrolled into a rehabilitation center's elementary school where a teacher recognized her talent with words and recommended that she become a writer. In 1967, Brimmer entered a regular school. Her Language Arts teacher was a poet who also persuaded her to write. That very same year she started to write poems. The first time her mother read one of her poems she was deeply moved, cried and asked her to keep them all so that a book could be published. Brimmer could only type on the typewriter with a toe from her left foot, the only part of her body she could control. In 1971, she was accepted into the Social and Political Sciences department at the National Autonomous University of Mexico as a Sociology major, but did not graduate.

== Gabriela Brimmer Foundation ==
Gaby founded an organization of people with disabilities, known as Asociación para los Derechos de Personas con Alteraciones Motoras (Adepam) (in English, Association for the Rights of People with Motor Disabilities) and was an active participant in a number of other organizations. Brimmer worked for the full participation of people with disabilities and at the same time managed to write poetry. Brimmer was regarded as one who enjoyed a moving sensitivity and a strength that stemmed from the depths of her soul. Observers of her life commented that she did not think of herself as an "outstanding personality," even when people could not hide their astonishment in seeing her do the things she did. She used to say, "life makes me to do it. Her message to people with disabilities was to rethink their ways of living by forgetting the limits imposed by others.

== See also ==
- Maslin, Janet (October 30, 1987). "Film: 'Gaby,' Story of Determination". The New York Times.
- Gaby: Una historia verdadera, es una película que narra la biografía de la poetisa y escritora mexicana de origen judío Gaby Brimmer. Es una coproducción estadounidense-mexicana.
- La actriz argentina Norma Aleandro, en el papel de Florencia, la mujer que ayudó a Gabriela en su evolución, fue nominada a los Premios Oscar como mejor actriz de reparto.
- Gaby Brimmer: An Autobiography in Three Voices., Waltham, MA, Brandeis UP, 2009.
