= The Nanny season 6 =

The Nanny
- Season 6
- DVD cover
- No. of episodes: 22

Release
- Original network: CBS
- Original release: September 30, 1998 – June 23, 1999

Season chronology
- ← Previous; Season 5

The sixth and final season of the American television sitcom The Nanny aired on CBS from September 30, 1998, to June 23, 1999. The series was created by actress Fran Drescher and her-then husband Peter Marc Jacobson, and developed by Prudence Fraser and Robert Sternin. Produced by Sternin and Fraser Ink Inc., Highschool Sweethearts and TriStar Television, the series features Drescher, Jacobson, Fraser, Sternin, Caryn Lucas and Diane Wilk as executive producers.

Based on an idea inspired by Drescher's visit with a friend and The Sound of Music, the series revolves around Fran Fine, a Jewish woman from Flushing, Queens, New York, who is hired by a wealthy Broadway producer to be the nanny to his three children. Drescher stars as the titular character, Charles Shaughnessy as British-born producer Maxwell Sheffield, and the children – Maggie, Brighton and Grace – portrayed by Nicholle Tom, Benjamin Salisbury, and Madeline Zima. The series also features Daniel Davis as Niles, the family butler, and Lauren Lane as C.C. Babcock, Maxwell's associate in his production company who is smitten with him. Several recurring characters also played a role in the sitcoms plotlines, many of whom were related to Fran.

The opening sequence changed slightly in this season. Producer Kathy Landsburg was promoted to co-executive producer of the series as her producer credit was moved to the in-show credits, while the creator credits of Drescher and Jacobson, and the developer credits of Sternin and Fraser were added in its place.

Beginning with this season, Renée Taylor, Ann Guilbert and Rachel Chagall are credited as "starring" during the in-show credits.

During the show's original run this season, the show went on a hiatus after the episode "California Here We Come" with the two-part finale airing several weeks later in May. However, six further first-run episodes aired in June, disrupting the chronological continuance of the show. This was remedied in syndication when the two-part finale was moved after the last aired episode from the first-run ("The Baby Shower").

Rachel Chagall was pregnant through half the season.

== Cast and characters ==
=== Main ===
- Fran Drescher as Fran Fine
- Charles Shaughnessy as Maxwell Sheffield
- Daniel Davis as Niles
- Lauren Lane as Chastity Claire "C.C" Babcock
- Nicholle Tom as Maggie Sheffield
- Benjamin Salisbury as Brighton Sheffield
- Madeline Zima as Grace Sheffield
- Renée Taylor as Sylvia Fine
- Rachel Chagall as Val Toriello
- Ann Morgan Guilbert as Yetta Rosenberg

=== Recurring ===
- Steve Lawrence as Morty Fine
- Andrew Levitas as Michael Brolin
- Nora Dunn as Dr. Reynolds

=== Guest stars ===
- Ray Abruzzo as Chopper Pilot
- Tawny Moyer as Nurse
- Chad Everett as Dr. Osborn
- Fred Stoller as Fred, the pharmacist
- Chris Bruno as Ski Instructor
- Sophie Ward as Jocelyn Sheffield
- Maxwell Caulfield as Rodney Pembroke
- James McDonnell as Colin
- Dakin Matthews as Dean Sterrett
- Anne Lambton as Madeline Porter
- Renee Cohen as Young Yetta
- Darryl Hickman as Priest
- Morty Drescher as Uncle Stanley
- Sylvia Drescher as Aunt Rose

=== Special guest stars ===
- Ray Stricklyn as Wendell Kent
- Bob Goen as himself
- Diane Baker as Roberta
- George Coe as Ernest
- Margaret Cho as Caryn
- Whoopi Goldberg as herself
- Tom Bergeron as himself
- Coolio as himself
- Estelle Getty as herself
- Howie Mandel as himself
- Martin Mull as himself
- Caroline Rhea as herself
- Rita Rudner as herself / Margot
- Bruce Vilanch as himself
- Chris Elliott as Chris Malley
- Ray Charles as Sammy
- Lainie Kazan as Aunt Freida
- Lynn Redgrave as herself
- Donna Douglas as herself
- Hal Linden as Maury Sherry
- Joseph Bologna as Dr. Joe Razzo

== Episodes ==
| No. overall | No. in season | Title | Directed by | Written by | Original release date | U.S. viewers (millions) |
|---|---|---|---|---|---|---|
| 125 | 1 | "The Honeymoon's Overboard" | Peter Marc Jacobson | Frank Lombardi | September 30, 1998 | 11.51 |
Fran and Maxwell find themselves on a desert island after falling off their honeymoon yacht. Maxwell becomes ill after receiving a venomous insect bite and Fran is left to care for them both. Somehow this leads to a hot and passionate moment in which they become intimate. Meanwhile, back home, C.C. turns Maxwell and Fran's disappearance into a media circus to milk the publicity. However, after a nightmare where reporters resembling Niles confront her with the fact that she wished misfortune on Fran at the wedding, she is guilt stricken and begins searching for them, accompanied by Sylvia. The pair are eventually able to locate the newlyweds when Sylvia is able to psychically sense Fran's happiness when she and Maxwell consummate their union.
| 126 | 2 | "Fran Gets Shushed" | Peter Marc Jacobson | Caryn Lucas | October 7, 1998 | 9.67 |
While trying to learn to live together Fran agrees to be less forward if Maxwell will learn to be less uptight. They both try–out their new personalities at a dinner party with disastrous results.
| 127 | 3 | "Once a Secretary, Always a Secretary" | Peter Marc Jacobson | Allen Jay Zipper | October 14, 1998 | 9.39 |
Brighton wants to go to Atlantic City with school friends while his father opposes the idea. Fran finds herself torn between being nanny and wife as Max calls her "The Nanny" during a TV interview. Grace goes through hormonal changes, briefly in the episode.
| 128 | 4 | "Sara's Parents" | Peter Marc Jacobson | Jayne Hamil | October 21, 1998 | 8.89 |
Fran dreads a visit by Sara's parents (the children's grandparents). When they arrive, many things go wrong and they feel that Fran is not suitable to "replace" their daughter. Also, Fran wants to legally adopt the children but Sara's parents are completely against it and threaten legal action.
| 129 | 5 | "Maggie's Boyfriend" | Peter Marc Jacobson | Rick Shaw | October 28, 1998 | 9.33 |
Fran couldn't be happier with Maggie's rich, handsome, Jewish, model boyfriend, but when they decide to share an apartment, Maxwell wants Fran to put her foot down.
| 130 | 6 | "I'm Pregnant" | Peter Marc Jacobson | Ivan Menchell | November 4, 1998 | 9.34 |
Maggie confides in Fran that she thinks she is pregnant, but she doesn't want Fran to tell Maxwell unless they're sure. They then attempt to administer a pregnancy test for her. Maxwell finds them and decides they must visit the doctor to be sure. During their visit, Dr. Reynolds (Nora Dunn) has some news for Fran.
| 131 | 7 | "Mom's the Word" | Peter Marc Jacobson | Cody Farley & Suzanne Myers | November 11, 1998 | 11.11 |
Fran tells Niles and her mother about her pregnancy, but wants to tell Maxwell on her own, in a special way. Maxwell, unknowingly, tells Fran he's not ready for another child yet. As Fran goes sulking in the park, she experiences severe pains in her abdomen, and is rushed to the emergency room.
| 132 | 8 | "Making Whoopi" | Peter Marc Jacobson | Suzanne Gangursky | November 18, 1998 | 9.53 |
Fran learns she had a hormone imbalance that resulted in a false positive, and was never pregnant. Maxwell is invited to be a panelist on Hollywood Squares to replace Andrew Lloyd Webber. Fran decides to try different methods (some without Maxwell's permission) to become pregnant, including almond cookies that are supposed to make her and Max "frisky" but are accidentally eaten by Niles and C.C. Note: Due to the sad nature of the cold opening, the theme song is not played in this episode. A title card with an image from the opening animation is briefly displayed with somber music, and the names of the ten stars are shown at the beginning of the following scene.
| 133 | 9 | "Oh, Say, Can You Ski?" | Peter Marc Jacobson | Dan Amernick & Jay Amernick | November 25, 1998 | 9.25 |
Maxwell invites Fran on a trip to meet the president, in hopes of helping her to relax. Fran soon stops worrying about becoming pregnant and nature takes its course.
| 134 | 10 | "The Hanukkah Story" | Peter Marc Jacobson | Story by : Matthew J. Berman; Teleplay by : Ivan Menchell | December 16, 1998 | 7.58 |
While excited about celebrating her first Hanukkah with her new husband and family, Maxwell, C.C. and Gracie must drive to Boston in a snowstorm. Fran is worried when they don't arrive on time and learns they have skidded into a ditch. She prays with a nun who stops to comfort her and Max, Gracie, and C.C. arrive. They had enough gas in the car for an hour, but it lasted for 8, just like the first Hanukkah candle. They then have the best "first day of Hanukkah" on the second day.
| 135 | 11 | "The In-Law Who Came Forever" | Peter Marc Jacobson | Story by : Danny Passman & Michael Scalisi; Teleplay by : Rick Shaw | January 6, 1999 | 9.16 |
Fran’s parents move into the Sheffield mansion after Aunt Freida buys their apartment building and evicts them. Maxwell and Fran at first aren't so happy. But later, Sylvia coddles Max who had a poor childhood relationship with his mother and he then doesn't want Sylvia to leave. In the end, Fran convinces him that if they leave it will be better. Sylvia and Frieda reconcile after Fran and the children edit her wedding video so it appears Frieda sang at the wedding.
| 136 | 12 | "The Fran in the Mirror" | Jennifer Reed | Story by : Chandler Evans; Teleplay by : Jayne Hamil | January 20, 1999 | 8.25 |
While Maxwell is away, Fran invests $1 million with his old college chum, Rodney Pembroke (Maxwell Caulfield). Soon after, she hears that he is broke and has been swindling others. She goes and demands it back, but after he gives her the check she decides to invest anyway, to give him another chance. Max and Fran then return again and he tells them that it was a good investment and Max has made $500,000. Fran attempts to get Grace admitted to a prestigious school and Niles learns a distant relative has died and left him an estate and title.
| 137 | 13 | "The Yummy Mummy" | Peter Marc Jacobson | Cody Farley & Suzanne Myers | February 3, 1999 | 7.72 |
Fran visits universities with Brighton, but his fellow students find Fran a bit too attractive and make inappropriate comments. Brighton then tells Fran that he doesn't want her visiting more colleges with him. Fran thinks it's because she's ignorant and starts reading encyclopedias and tries to sound smart. Finally, Brighton tells her the real reason, and unlike him, she doesn't mind if she's thought of as "hot and sexy". Meanwhile, Fran finds out that she and Maxwell are having twins.
| 138 | 14 | "California, Here We Come" | Peter Marc Jacobson | Story by : Mary Lindes; Teleplay by : Suzanne Gangursky | March 31, 1999 | 8.12 |
Maxwell is asked to turn one of his plays into a sitcom, and the Sheffields might be moving to California. Fran thinks that her mother is heartbroken that her daughter is leaving her and rents her a home in California also. However, Sylvia tells Fran she really wants to stay in New York. When Fran investigates, she finds out that her mother has been seeing a doctor three times a week—not because she is sick, as Fran finds out, but because she is having an affair.
| 139 | 15 | "Ma'ternal Affairs" | Peter Marc Jacobson | Frank Lombardi | June 2, 1999 | 6.36 |
Fran checks into the man/doctor (played by Joseph Bologna, Renée Taylor's husband) with whom Sylvia is having an affair and coaches her father, Morty (Steve Lawrence), whose face is revealed for the first time, on spicing up their marriage. Ironically, the same man is at the dinner party Fran and Max force Sylvia and Morty into attending, and he unintentionally convinces Morty to tell Sylvia how special she is to him. Morty even serenades her after she forgives him.
| 140 | 16 | "The Producers" | Peter Marc Jacobson | Story by : Mike Dow & Chandler Evans; Teleplay by : Rick Shaw | June 9, 1999 | 6.44 |
Niles finally admits to Fran that he loves C.C.! The duo try and produce a play (using Max and C.C.'s name) so that Niles will become successful and eligible to marry C.C. Instead of success, they are served with a $250,000 lawsuit. Max rescues them and the play becomes a success. At the end, Niles suddenly proposes to C.C..
| 141 | 17 | "The Dummy Twins" | Steve Posner | Story by : Rachel Chagall & Harriet Goldman & Camelia Kath & Ivan Menchell; Teleplay by : Ivan Menchell | June 16, 1999 | 5.96 |
Fran coaches Niles in his unappreciated courtship of C.C. It goes poorly and Niles feels humiliated. He quits the Sheffield's, but not before calling C.C. pathetic and lonely, causing C.C. to leave her partnership with Maxwell. Later Fran and Max go to Niles' room in an attempt to convince him to stay and find him and C.C. in bed together.
| 142 | 18 | "Yetta's Letters" | Peter Marc Jacobson | Story by : Bernie Vyzga; Teleplay by : Dan Amernick & Jay Amernick | June 16, 1999 | 6.60 |
Maxwell uses Yetta's love letters as the basis for a Broadway musical beating Andrew Lloyd Webber who also wanted to use them. Max and Fran get Sylvia to sign the rights over to him, and the show is a huge hit.
| 143 | 19 | "Maggie's Wedding" | Fran Drescher | Jayne Hamil | June 23, 1999 | 6.43 |
Michael proposes to Maggie. At first Max opposes, but after he and Maggie talk, he agrees. Meanwhile, Fran learns that Michael's cousin is James Brolin and that Barbra Streisand is coming to Maggie and Michael's wedding. Fran is so excited that she goes into premature labor causing her to miss Barbra. She sneaks back home and finds the house empty, only to learn that Barbra and the rest went to at the hospital to meet her, causing her to miss Barbra sing once again. Finally, Maggie and Michael get married.
| 144 | 20 | "The Baby Shower" | Peter Marc Jacobson | Story by : Howard Preiser & James Nelson & Sean Hanley; Teleplay by : Cody Farley & Suzanne Myers | June 23, 1999 | 7.04 |
Fran gets bad news from her fortune teller that Max will set eyes on a blonde in California. At the same time, Mrs. Fran Fine-Sheffield runs into actress Fran Drescher and her future of what will happen is her storyline on her show. Also, Fran and Maxwell balk over Brighton's decision to take a year off to travel before going to college.
| 145 | 21 | "The Finale: Part 1" | Peter Marc Jacobson | Caryn Lucas | May 12, 1999 | 11.11 |
During Fran and Maxwell's first anniversary, C.C. flees after Niles proposes again. Fran pursues her and the two are trapped in an elevator when Fran begins labor.
| 146 | 22 | "The Finale: Part 2" | Peter Marc Jacobson | Caryn Lucas & Peter Marc Jacobson & Frank Lombardi | May 12, 1999 | 11.11 |
While Fran is giving birth, C.C. and Niles get married (in which C.C.'s full name is finally revealed) and learn that they are also expectant parents. After Fran gives birth to twins Jonah Samuel and Eve Catherine, Maggie and Brighton head to Europe and the remainder of the Sheffield family, along with Niles & C.C., head to California and a new life. The end of the episode features flashbacks from the series' six-season run, followed by a final curtain call of the cast members and some parting words from Fran Drescher.: Recording date: March 26, 1999
