= The Nanny season 4 =

The Nanny
- Season 4
- DVD cover
- No. of episodes: 26

Release
- Original network: CBS
- Original release: September 18, 1996 – May 21, 1997

Season chronology
- ← Previous; Season 3 Next → Season 5

The fourth season of the American television sitcom The Nanny aired on CBS from September 18, 1996, to May 21, 1997. The series was created by actress Fran Drescher and her-then husband Peter Marc Jacobson, and developed by Prudence Fraser and Robert Sternin. Produced by Sternin and Fraser Ink Inc., Highschool Sweethearts and TriStar Television, the series features Drescher, Jacobson, Fraser, Sternin, Caryn Lucas and Diane Wilk as executive producers.

Based on an idea inspired by Drescher's visit with a friend and The Sound of Music, the series revolves around Fran Fine, a Jewish woman from Flushing, Queens, New York, who is hired by a wealthy Broadway producer to be the nanny to his three children. Drescher stars as the titular character, Charles Shaughnessy as British-born producer Maxwell Sheffield, and the children – Maggie, Brighton and Grace – portrayed by Nicholle Tom, Benjamin Salisbury, and Madeline Zima. The series also features Daniel Davis as Niles, the family butler, and Lauren Lane as C.C. Babcock, Maxwell's associate in his production company who is smitten with him. Several recurring characters also played a role in the sitcom's plotlines, many of whom were related to Fran.

== Cast and characters ==
=== Main ===
- Fran Drescher as Fran Fine
- Charles Shaughnessy as Maxwell Sheffield
- Daniel Davis as Niles
- Lauren Lane as Chastity Claire "C.C" Babcock
- Nicholle Tom as Maggie Sheffield
- Benjamin Salisbury as Brighton Sheffield
- Madeline Zima as Grace Sheffield

=== Recurring ===
- Renée Taylor as Sylvia Fine
- Ann Morgan Guilbert as Yetta Rosenberg
- Rachel Chagall as Val Toriello
- Spalding Gray as Dr. Jack Miller

=== Guest stars ===
- Steve Lawrence as Morty Fine
- Joey Dente as Pauly
- Brian Bloom as John
- Sean Kanan as Mike McMullen
- Jackie Tohn as Francine
- Marilyn Cooper as Grandma Nettie Fine
- George Furth as Minister
- Dana Gould as Josh Bassin
- Sally Kirkland as Tattoo Lady
- Les Brandt as Rico
- Darryl Hickman as Mr. Binder
- Joel Murray as Val's Date
- Brenda Epperson as Danielle
- Robert Costanzo as Juror #4
- Luigi Amodeo as Vincenzo / Bernie Schwartzberg
- Gloria Gifford as District Attorney
- Barry Livingston as Defense Attorney
- Laura Kightlinger as Kiki Hanson
- Fred Stoller as Fred, the pharmacist
- Michael Brandon as Stan
- Jane Sibbett as Marcy Feldman / Morgan Faulkner
- Ivana Milicevic as Tasha
- Lois Chiles as Elaine
- Ed Begley Jr. as Tom Rosenstein
- Stanley Kamel as Condo Representative
- Alicia Machado as Miss Universe
- Darryl Hickman as Doctor

=== Special guest stars ===
- Jason Alexander as Jack
- Nora Dunn as Mrs. Richardson
- Rosie O'Donnell as herself
- Donald Trump as himself
- John McDaniel as himself
- Donald O'Connor as Fred
- Lainie Kazan as Aunt Freida
- Joan Collins as Joan Sheffield
- Robert Vaughn as James Sheffield
- Jay Leno as himself
- Rich Little as IRS Appeals Officer
- Monty Hall as himself
- Harry Van Gorkum as Nigel Sheffield
- John Astin as Dr. Roberts
- Roslyn Kind as herself
- Todd Graff as Harvey
- Pamela Anderson as Heather Biblow-Imperiali
- Myra Carter as Grandma Eloise
- Jon Stewart as Bobby
- Gordon Thomson as Chandler
- Peter Scolari as Leslie Tilbert
- Robert Urich as Judge Jerry Moran
- Telma Hopkins as Lila Baker
- Jayne Meadows as herself
- Bette Midler as herself
- Peter Bergman as himself
- Richard Kline as himself
- Jeanne Cooper as herself
- Shemar Moore as himself
- Joshua Morrow as himself
- Brook Mahealani Lee as herself
- Melody Thomas Scott as herself
- Hunter Tylo as herself
- Céline Dion as herself

== Episodes ==
No. overall	No. in season	Title	Directed by	Written by	Original release date	Prod. code	U.S. viewers (millions)
76	1	"The Tart with Heart"	Dorothy Lyman	Frank Lombardi	September 18, 1996	403	15.1
Fran and Maxwell return from their trip to Paris, and Fran could not be happier. Just as they arrive home, Maxwell takes back saying "I love you" to Fran, and she is devastated. C.C. takes advantage of the fact that Fran is vulnerable and says Maxwell probably only hired her for her looks, which Max accidentally confirms when he tries to compliment Fran. She decides to go to a singles bar with Val and meets a blind man, Jack (Jason Alexander). The idea of dating a blind man sounds nice to Fran, since it will serve as a proof that she is not merely a pretty face. After Jack ends things with her, she and Maxwell decide to remain just friends.
77	2	"The Cradle Robbers"	Dorothy Lyman	Nastaran Dibai & Jeffrey B. Hodes	September 25, 1996	402	14.7
Maxwell is furious when he discovers Maggie is seeing 25-year-old John (Brian Bloom). He wants Fran to stop the relationship, but will not listen to her when she tells him to see a doctor for his hearing problem. Fran decides to chaperone Maggie on her (last) date with John, but she completely forgets Maxwell's orders when she meets John's handsome friend Mike (Sean Kanan), who is interested in Fran. Still, she has to fix Maggie's problem, so she decides to let it flow and wait until she tires of John, which happens quickly. Unfortunately, it means that Fran will have to drop her 25-year-old as well. Meanwhile, C.C. misses an incredible opportunity of dinner with Max when she falls asleep as the result of a caffeine prank Niles pulled.
78	3	"The Bird's Nest"	Dorothy Lyman	Story by : Robbie Schwartz; Teleplay by : Jayne Hamil	September 25, 1996	401	17.8
Fran takes Gracie to the Loehmann's Semi-Annual Red Star Clearance and tussles over a green sweater with another shopper (Nora Dunn). Back at the mansion, Maxwell threatens to send Brighton to military school unless his science grade improves. Maxwell also warns Fran not to help Brighton with his science project, but of course Fran does not listen. They decide to warm a bird's eggs with lights and make a report on the birth, but Fran forgets to turn off the lights and the eggs hard boil. Now Fran must ask Brighton's teacher for an extension, and is surprised to learn the teacher is the same woman from whom she snatched the green sweater.
79	4	"The Rosie Show"	Dorothy Lyman	Nastaran Dibai & Jeffrey B. Hodes	October 9, 1996	404	13.8
Fran, Val, and Gracie attend a taping of The Rosie O'Donnell Show and Fran is picked from the audience to talk to Rosie. She is so natural and funny that Rosie asks her to appear on the show as a regular guest to give parenting advice. C.C. jumps in as her agent, and Fran begins to experience life as a celebrity. Maxwell is concerned he may lose her and concocts a story about a dream he had where her grandmother's ghost told him something horrible would happen to Fran if she did not quit Rosie's show (a parody of the dream scene in Fiddler on the Roof). Fran is soon fired and replaced by a retired couple (played by Fran Drescher's parents) from Florida. Special guest stars: Donald Trump and Marla Maples as themselves.
80	5	"Freida Needa Man"	Dorothy Lyman	Frank Lombardi	October 16, 1996	405	13.5
Fran's Aunt Freida (Lainie Kazan) is bankrupt and moves into the Sheffield residence. The only way Fran can turn this around is to convince Freida's wealthy boyfriend Fred (Donald O'Connor) to propose. Fred does not think of himself as an exciting man, so Fran attempts to give him dance lessons. He has a heart attack and falls on Fran, just as Freida enters the room. After the situation is cleared, everything seems fine again until Fred tells Fran he is in love with her. She plans to stop the wedding, but Maxwell intervenes. Just as the rabbi completes the marriage ceremony, Fred has another heart attack, but he eventually manages to recover.
81	6	"Me and Mrs. Joan"	Dorothy Lyman	Peter Marc Jacobson	October 30, 1996	406	15.3
Maxwell's father, James (Robert Vaughn), is in town and Fran decides to help end the Sheffield family feud by inviting James for dinner. James brings Joan (guest star Joan Collins), his former secretary for whom he left Maxwell's mother. Maxwell is outraged at his father's selfishness during dinner, while Fran keeps wondering why can't Maxwell act more like his father and marry the help.
82	7	"The Taxman Cometh"	Dorothy Lyman	Dan Amernick & Jay Amernick	November 6, 1996	407	15.3
Jay Leno leaves his dog under the care of Maxwell. Meanwhile, the IRS audits Fran's tax returns, and not even flirting and champagne can help her. She asks Maxwell for help, and he accompanies her to the IRS office to verify the information Fran claimed. The hearing is proceeding poorly until Jay Leno appears to claim his dog, making the appeals officer happy enough to dismiss the case.
83	8	"An Affair to Dismember"	Dorothy Lyman	Diane Wilk	November 13, 1996	408	15.7
Nigel Sheffield arrives in New York, but busy Maxwell asks Fran to show him around town. They go to nightclubs and parties, and Fran starts acting very happy for finally having a social life – something she complained about not having since she started working at the house. Nigel surprises Fran when he proposes to her and asks her to leave with him aboard a luxurious liner. Doubtful, she thinks about her relationship with Maxwell, its past and its future. On one hand she has the man she really loves but hasn't made a move in three years. On the other hand, she can be with a rich, good looking and single man, which is everything she always wanted. She chooses to go with Nigel, but reaches the pier too late and must return home. Maxwell arrives and cares for Fran, who twisted her ankle on her way back. Some things are just meant (not) to be.
84	9	"Tattoo"	Dorothy Lyman	Caryn Lucas	November 20, 1996	409	15.5
Maggie wants a tattoo, Fran already has one and Maxwell is intrigued with the idea of learning where Fran's tattoo is hidden.
85	10	"The Car Show"	Dorothy Lyman	Robbie Schwartz	December 11, 1996	410	12.7
Maggie wants a new car, but since her father won't give her one she convinces Fran to enter a beauty pageant to win one for her. In the contest, Fran must drive a stick shift but doesn't know how, so Maxwell takes her into the country to teach her. Fran is traumatized after running over a bunny, and loses the contest. To cheer her, Maxwell invites her to accompany C. C. and him to a charity dinner at Barbra Streisand's house. On their way, Maxwell has a stomachache, forcing Fran to drive. Later she realizes it was all a plan to make her get over her trauma. Now she has to go to Barbra's again, but to return the boot and purse she stole from her.
86	11	"Hurricane Fran"	Dorothy Lyman	Rick Shaw	December 18, 1996	411	12.5
Fran decides to take her vacation at a tropical resort with Val and leave Maxwell and the children home. A hurricane hits the island, making Fran's dream vacation a nightmare. She returns home early to find a lonely Maxwell, who later takes the entire family on a cruise around the Greek Islands.
87	12	"Danny's Dead and Who's Got the Will?"	Dorothy Lyman	Jayne Hamil	January 8, 1997	412	15.75
Danny Imperiali, Fran's former fiancé, dies. At his funeral (while comforting Danny's widow, Heather Biblow, played by guest star Pamela Anderson), she meets a Jewish man who was ignored by his former lover's family and got nothing after he died. Afraid the same thing will happen to her, Fran stands up for herself and implores Maxwell to do something. Afraid his visiting grandmother might disapprove of Fran and disinherit him, Maxwell does nothing, so Fran quits. When he realizes he might have lost Fran forever, Maxwell goes after her and takes back what he took back -- that he loved her.
88	13	"Kissing Cousins"	Dorothy Lyman	Caryn Lucas	January 15, 1997	413	13.04
Fran meets an incredible man (guest star Jon Stewart) at a singles bar. He's Jewish, a doctor, rich, and everything Fran ever dreamed of in a man. But during her cousin's wedding (where she is a bridesmaid) Fran discovers that Mr. Perfect is her cousin! Seeing Fran devastated, Maxwell decides to send her to a therapist, Dr. Miller (Spaulding Gray), who says Fran is obsessed with marriage. Fran decides to stop chasing men, just to make Maxwell guilty.
89	14	"The Fifth Wheel"	Dorothy Lyman	Jayne Hamil	January 29, 1997	414	11.58
Fran decides to stop chasing men like Dr. Miller told her. Sylvia doesn't like that and blames Maxwell for her daughter staying single forever. Fran, Val and C.C. decide to go out together on a "girl's night", with no pressure to find a man, but after Val and C.C. get dates, Fran finds herself as a fifth wheel on their double date. Alone, embarrassed and depressed, Fran goes home trying to act as if she had a great time with them, but can't. Once again, Maxwell and Fran find themselves alone, comforting each other. Meanwhile, Dr. Miller tries hypnosis with Sylvia but that doesn't go too well.
90	15	"The Nose Knows"	Dorothy Lyman	Story by : Suzanne Gangursky; Teleplay by : Rick Shaw	February 5, 1997	416	13.44
Fran is upset when she finds Maxwell and a model necking in the living room. Dr. Miller says Fran is upset because she thinks of Maxwell as her husband, not as her employer. At the movies, she runs into Dr. Miller, but is shocked to see him picking his nose. She is so disgusted that she debates never seeing him again due to his "inappropriate behavior". Maxwell worries about her and confronts Dr. Miller about his actions, but gets very embarrassed when he finds out the "inappropriate behavior" Sylvia told him about wasn't what he had in mind. Meanwhile, C.C.'s boyfriend, Chandler, dumps her and she asks Niles to escort her to an awards show where the two have a very pleasant night.
91	16	"The Bank Robbery"	Dorothy Lyman	Jayne Hamil	February 12, 1997	417	13.97
Yetta has a new, much younger (age 60) boyfriend who's already proposed. Sylvia is afraid he's after Yetta's money and takes steps to ensure money can't be taken out of their joint accounts without both signatures. While waiting in line, a bumbling criminal (Peter Scolari) attempts to rob the bank and makes Sylvia and Fran hostages. The robber is so unprepared that he even forgets to put on the mask and accidentally reveals his name - Leslie Tilbett - and Fran befriends him. They chat, order some food, and the kidnapper even acts as mediator between Fran and Maxwell (who upset Fran with a Valentine's Day faux pas). When Leslie decides to leave, Fran and Sylvia argue about the best escape route to avoid capture and both accompany him as hostages. At the bank door, Maxwell apologizes for taking back saying he loved Fran, and they make up. Sylvia is still a hostage but the robber is soon arrested after she makes him stop at a Mongolian Barbecue restaurant to get food.
92	17	"Samson, He Denied Her"	Dorothy Lyman	Flo Cameron	February 19, 1997	415	13.60
Maxwell calls from the limo saying he has to repair a mistake he made to Fran six–months ago. She's very excited at the prospect of him coming forward, and telling her he loves her again. To her disappointment, he merely wants to pay her a little extra, with money he received from a tax claim. Tired of living on high expectations, Fran decides to accept a jury duty summons is assigned to a case with C.C. To Fran's surprise, the case is about a woman who chopped off her boss' hair just because he told her he loved her then took it back. Fran manages to convince the jury that the woman is not guilty, and finds out later that the man married the employee. Meanwhile, Sylvia fills in for Fran as nanny and the entire Sheffield family becomes famished as Sylvia is an eating machine.
93	18	"The Facts of Lice"	Dorothy Lyman	Nastaran Dibai & Jeffrey B. Hodes	March 5, 1997	418	12.61
Niles is depressed about his life as a butler and begins to act strangely. While cleaning, he drops a piece of paper containing a list of items whose contents, along with his odd behavior, convince Fran that he could be planning a murder. Fran searches his room and confirms her suspicions. During a stormy night, Maxwell takes the children out for dinner leaving Fran and Niles alone. Niles approaches Fran and she thinks he is about to murder her. Fran says she knows his plans and Niles asks how she learned he is writing a play. Meanwhile, Fran and the children become infected with lice.
94	19	"Fran's Roots"	Dorothy Lyman	Caryn Lucas	March 12, 1997	419	13.39
A woman (Telma Hopkins) calls Fran saying she might be her mother due to a mix–up in the hospital when she was born. Doubtful, Fran goes to Sylvia to ask her about the day she was born, and finds out the story might be true after Sylvia says she left her for a moment while chasing a food cart. Terrified that her whole life might have been a lie, Fran invites the woman, Lila Baker, to the house, and is surprised to learn she is black. After Fran visits to Lila's mansion, Fran insists that she could still be Lila's daughter since her late husband was Jewish. However, the DNA test proves otherwise and Fran is really Sylvia's daughter. Sylvia only realizes this after spending time dining on the wonderful food at Lila's house. Meanwhile, Niles tries to convince Maxwell to sell one of his plays to CBS so C.C. must move to Los Angeles.
95	20	"The Nanny and the Hunk Producer"	Dorothy Lyman	Frank Lombardi	April 2, 1997	420	12.90
After Maxwell's production of "The Widower" finally bests longtime rival, Andrew Lloyd Webber to win the Tony Award for best play of the year, a tabloid publishes false stories about Maxwell and Fran having an affair since Maxwell's honeymoon. Maggie is very upset about it, and won't believe it's not true. Fran is not upset by the story's untruthfulness, but because it said she was 40. Maxwell and Fran go to the tabloid to confront the journalist (Michael Brandon), and he assures them he won't print any more stories about them because that issue had the lowest circulation in 5 years! Meanwhile, Niles is upset because Maxwell didn't invite him to the cast party, and Dr. Miller convinces Maxwell to give Niles a "Butler of the Year" award.
96	21	"The Passed-Over Story"	Dorothy Lyman	Rick Shaw	April 9, 1997	421	12.50
As Fran prepares for Passover, she is plagued by the fact that her old-school rival has been cast in the lead of Maxwell's new play.
97	22	"No Muse is Good Muse"	Dorothy Lyman	Jayne Hamil	April 23, 1997	422	11.63
After watching a video by new female rock star Tasha (Ivana Miličević) on MTV, Fran decides to write lyrics of her own about her misery and suffering and make it big in showbiz. Discouraged by Maxwell, Fran decides to hand her lyrics to Tasha no matter what, and even passes herself and Val as a hotel maids just to meet Tasha. When she finally does, Tasha is so interested in reaching out and listening to what the people have to say that she actually hangs out with Fran. Fran's song is no good, but her misery is good enough for Tasha, who uses Fran as her muse – until Maxwell tells Fran he misses her. Fran turns happy, which makes Tasha turn to Val for inspiration (after all, Val lives with her parents, is over 30 and single).
98	23	"You Bette Your Life"	Dorothy Lyman	Frank Lombardi	April 30, 1997	423	11.23
Fran offers herself for the charity auction Maxwell is putting together with Bette Midler. A gifted 10-year-old pianist, son of a big investor, wins the auction for $5000 and receives a day with Fran as his babysitter. Fran takes him to Yetta's retirement home and while entertaining the elderly with his piano skills, one senior collapses and dies in front of the boy. Shocked, he says he will never play again, and his father cancels his promised $5 million investment with Maxwell and Bette. Bette Midler goes to the mansion herself to teach Fran a lesson, but luckily Gracie picked up a few things from Fran over the past four years, and convinces the boy to play again and saves his father's investment.
99	24	"The Heather Biblow Story"	Dorothy Lyman	Ivan Menchell	May 7, 1997	426	10.88
Fran is shocked to learn that her biggest rival, Heather Biblow (who stole her fiancé and her job) is starring on her favorite soap opera, The Young and the Restless. Heather invites Fran and Val to her Malibu beach house, where she can flaunt her success. Fran and Val visit the studio, where they encounter some of their favorite soap stars (Peter Bergman, Jeanne Cooper, Shemar Moore, Joshua Morrow, Melody Thomas Scott, Barbara Crampton, and Hunter Tylo). Heather has difficulty memorizing the lines, and Fran doesn't think twice before jumping at the chance of finally stealing something from Heather: her daytime TV job. Fran is hired to replace her, and calls the mansion saying she won't return. C.C. is happy at first, but quickly realizes she needs Miss Fine back when Maxwell hires Heather as her replacement. Fran is so distracted by the thought of Heather in the house that she can't concentrate and is fired from the show. She returns to New York and her nanny position.
100	25	"The Boca Story"	Dorothy Lyman	Caryn Lucas	May 14, 1997	425	11.12
Sylvia decides to invest in a condo development in Boca Raton. Although Fran should be ecstatic at the news, it upsets her deeply. Dr. Miller says it's because deep down she doesn't want her mother to leave. While Maxwell is judging the Miss Universe competition nearby, he thinks if he takes Fran to see the condo she'll accept the idea. Just when Fran finally realizes how much peace she'd receive from seeing the development, they discover there is no condo, only a swamp. Fran is devastated (especially when Sylvia interrupts her fantasy from coming true), but at least she won't have to separate from her mother yet. Meanwhile, Niles feels bad as he is the only one of his friends who's still single. Guest Stars: Alicia Machado.
101	26	"Fran's Gotta Have It"	Dorothy Lyman	Diane Wilk	May 21, 1997	424	10.84
Maxwell goes to London to convince Celine Dion into doing Broadway. Fran decides to go after him and take advantage of the romantic scenario to solve their situation once and for all. After a romantic afternoon together, Max and Fran go back to the hotel and almost sleep together, if it wasn't for him backing out in the last minute. Insulted, offended and tired of all the cat and mouse play, Fran decides to leave him before it's too late for her to marry anybody. But they receive a phone call from home saying that Niles just suffered a heart attack. Fran decides to stay and help while Niles recovers, giving Maxwell another chance to make a commitment. While in the hospital room together, they both realize that they must "live each day as if it were their last." Meanwhile, C.C. is surprisingly upset after Niles' attack and even visits at the hospital to bring flowers. She reveals to Fran that deep down she doesn't hate Niles as much as it seems.
