= The Nanny season 5 =

The Nanny
- Season 5
- DVD cover
- No. of episodes: 23

Release
- Original network: CBS
- Original release: October 1, 1997 – May 13, 1998

Season chronology
- ← Previous; Season 4 Next → Season 6

The fifth season of the American television sitcom The Nanny aired on CBS from October 1, 1997, to May 13, 1998. The series was created by actress Fran Drescher and her-then husband Peter Marc Jacobson, and developed by Prudence Fraser and Robert Sternin. Produced by Sternin and Fraser Ink Inc., Highschool Sweethearts and TriStar Television, the series features Drescher, Jacobson, Fraser, Sternin, Caryn Lucas and Diane Wilk as executive producers.

Based on an idea inspired by Drescher's visit with a friend and The Sound of Music, the series revolves around Fran Fine, a Jewish woman from Flushing, Queens, New York, who is hired by a wealthy Broadway producer to be the nanny to his three children. Drescher stars as the titular character, Charles Shaughnessy as British-born producer Maxwell Sheffield, and the children – Maggie, Brighton and Grace – portrayed by Nicholle Tom, Benjamin Salisbury, and Madeline Zima. The series also features Daniel Davis as Niles, the family butler, and Lauren Lane as C.C. Babcock, Maxwell's associate in his production company who is smitten with him. Several recurring characters also played a role in the sitcoms plotlines, many of whom were related to Fran.

== Production ==
Lauren Lane was pregnant through half the season, which was covered up by a scripted weight gain and a character arc that allowed her to be absent for several episodes.

The previous season, CBS had moved the series from the anchor of its Monday night lineup to Wednesday nights, both to make room for Bill Cosby's comeback vehicle Cosby as the anchor of its Monday night lineup, and to improve the ratings of its Wednesday night series. The move caused a decline in ratings, as it was paired with series with which it seen as incompatible such as Pearl, or series such as Temporarily Yours that quickly faltered in the ratings. During the first half of the fifth season, CBS paired the series with the final season of Murphy Brown. However, both experienced significant declines in the ratings. Midway through the season, CBS executives threatened to cancel the series unless Fran and Mr. Sheffield marry. Although they were against the idea, Drescher and Jacobson did so in the interest of continuing the series.

== Cast and characters ==
=== Main ===
- Fran Drescher as Fran Fine
- Charles Shaughnessy as Maxwell Sheffield
- Daniel Davis as Niles
- Lauren Lane as Chastity Claire "C.C" Babcock
- Nicholle Tom as Maggie Sheffield
- Benjamin Salisbury as Brighton Sheffield
- Madeline Zima as Grace Sheffield

=== Recurring ===
- Renée Taylor as Sylvia Fine
- Rachel Chagall as Val Toriello
- Ann Morgan Guilbert as Yetta Rosenberg
- Spalding Gray as Dr. Jack Miller

=== Guest stars ===
- Joey Slotnick as Brian Levine
- Michael Ensign as Trevor
- Jennie Kwan as Mai Ling
- Allan Rich as Uncle Ray
- Fred Stoller as Fred, the pharmacist
- Ajay Mehta as Akbar
- Vasili Bogazianos as Burglar
- Chris Hogan as Dirk
- T. K. Carter as Ty
- Leila Kenzle as Naomi Demble
- Richard Fancy as Chandler Evans
- Liz Torres as Consuela
- Jessica Tuck as C.C.'s Replacement
- Kathryn Joosten as Ward Nurse
- Yvonne Sciò as Geneviève
- Sophie Ward as Jocelyn Sheffield
- Darryl Hickman as Officiating Priest
- Morty Drescher as Uncle Stanley

=== Special guest stars ===
- Roseanne Barr as Cousin Sheila
- Elton John as himself
- David Furnish as himself
- Brian Setzer as himself
- Lisa Loeb as Chloe
- Lainie Kazan as Aunt Freida
- Joyce Brothers as Dr. Joyce Brothers
- Chevy Chase as himself
- Ray Charles as Sammy
- Bryant Gumbel as himself
- Harry Hamlin as Professor Steve
- Scott Baio as Dr. Frankie Cresitelli
- Michael Bolton as himself
- Joan Van Ark as Margo Lange
- Cindy Adams as herself
- Dick Martin as Preston Collier
- Coolio as Irwin
- Ray Romano as Ray Barone
- Robert Vaughn as James Sheffield
- Maria Conchita Alonso as Concepcion Sheffield
- Harry Van Gorkum as Nigel Sheffield
- Whoopi Goldberg as Edna
- Marla Maples as herself

== Episodes ==
No. overall	No. in season	Title	Directed by	Written by	Original release date	Prod. code	U.S. viewers (millions)
102	1	"The Morning After"	Dorothy Lyman	Caryn Lucas	October 1, 1997	501	12.19
While Niles is recovering from his heart attack, Mr. Sheffield asks Fran to redecorate the kitchen to distract her from what happened between them the prior night at the hospital. Fran enlists her cousin Sheila (guest star Roseanne Barr) to help with redecorating, but becomes concerned that they lead parallel lives when she learns that Sheila has broken–up with her employer. Meanwhile, Yetta is engaged to Sammy, her new fiancé.
103	2	"First Date"	Dorothy Lyman	Story by : Frank Lombardi & Sarah McMullen; Teleplay by : Frank Lombardi	October 8, 1997	502	13.53
Maxwell trusts Fran to be his date at the screening of a new documentary by Elton John (Elton John and David Furnish guest star). While the Sheffields, Fran, Niles, C.C., Sylvia and Yetta view the movie, they learn that Fran accidentally angered Elton once in passing. In order to hide this from Maxwell and not revive Elton's memory, she disguises herself as Yetta.
104	3	"The Bobbie Fleckman Story"	Dorothy Lyman	Diane Wilk	October 15, 1997	503	11.94
Brighton wins a radio contest and the prize is that a film crew is coming to his house for a new music video by the Brian Setzer Orchestra (Brian Setzer and Lisa Loeb guest star). When the film producers crew comes, Bobbi Fleckman (Fran Drescher, reprising her role from This Is Spinal Tap) accompanies them. She bears a striking resemblance to Fran, and she tells Fran not to talk so much because her voice is so annoying. Fran thinks that Maxwell is attracted to Bobbi so she has Sylvia lock Bobbi in the bathroom and Fran takes her place. Maxwell soon realizes that Fran has disguised herself as Bobbi to teach Bobbi a lesson, and he tells her he has no romantic interest in Bobbi.
105	4	"Fransom"	Dorothy Lyman	Jayne Hamil	October 22, 1997	505	11.09
Fran prepares a wedding shower for Yetta, and cares for C.C.'s dog, Chester. While walking him, a man (Joey Slotnick) flirts with Fran to distract her while his wife (Yvonne Sciò) and partner in crime dog-naps Chester. When Fran and Val attempt to rescue Chester, they become hostages also and it's up to Maxwell to rescue them.
106	5	"The Ex-Niles"	Dorothy Lyman	Jeffrey B. Hodes & Nastaran Dibai	October 29, 1997	506	10.99
Niles demands a raise and Maxwell refuses, causing him to quit. He finds employment with Fran's paternal aunt, Frieda (recurring guest star Lainie Kazan) and is replaced at the Sheffield household by a sophisticated butler who won't gossip with Fran or spar with C.C. Soon he returns, agreeing to do anything but "clean windows". Meanwhile Fran and C.C. make an appointment with a professional woman, guest star Dr. Joyce Brothers, to decide to see which is the better woman for Mr. Sheffield.
107	6	"A Decent Proposal"	Dorothy Lyman	Ivan Menchell	November 5, 1997	504	13.52
The Sheffields, Niles, Fran and C.C. go to Atlantic City for a project, and stay at Trump Taj Mahal. Maxwell is jealous that guest star Chevy Chase asks Fran to pay a late-night visit to his room. Meanwhile, Niles is addicted to gambling, so Fran confiscates his wallet and gives it to Grace. Niles, believing C.C. has his wallet, goes to her room and demands it back, but she believes he is propositioning her.
108	7	"Mommy and Mai"	Dorothy Lyman	Caryn Lucas	November 12, 1997	507	11.74
Mai Ling, the Cambodian girl Fran and Val "adopted" in high school for 17 cents a day, is coming to New York to visit. Sylvia doesn't like the girl, over whom Fran and Val fight, resulting in a split up between the two best friends. Sylvia thinks Mai Ling will also come between Fran and Mr. Sheffield, but Fran learns that Mai Ling got engaged to Brighton to get a green card. Meanwhile, Maxwell thinks Niles is acting like Fran to gain attention.
109	8	"Fair Weather Fran"	Dorothy Lyman	Rick Shaw	November 19, 1997	508	10.34
Fran is upset about Yetta's upcoming wedding and Dr. Miller advises her to focus her energy on new life projects. She decides to pursue an old dream of becoming a weather girl, and thanks to Sammy (Ray Charles), who's Bryant Gumbel's uncle, Fran scores an audition for editorial commenter of Public Eye. Mr. Sheffield does not like the idea of Fran leaving the house, so he schemes with Gracie to convince Fran into quitting her new job. Their plan is in vain, because Fran ruins her own audition by mistaking gene therapy with therapeutic jeans. Meanwhile, Sylvia has problems accepting her soon-to-be stepfather.
110	9	"Educating Fran"	Dorothy Lyman	Suzanne Gangursky	December 10, 1997	509	10.39
Fran goes to Maggie's school to have a word with her philosophy teacher, Steve (Harry Hamlin), and develops a crush on him. After asking Maggie for her approval, Fran starts dating the gorgeous Jewish bachelor, which, of course, upsets Mr. Sheffield but still doesn't prod him to reveal his true feelings towards Fran. Fran lies about her age to Professor Steve, and later pays the price when his astrologist tells him he should be with a woman in her mid-thirties. Meanwhile, Niles and C.C. become addicted to Spanish soap operas.
111	10	"From Flushing with Love"	Dorothy Lyman	Story by : Dan Amernick & Jay Amernick and Sean Hanley; Teleplay by : Dan Amernick & Jay Amernick	December 17, 1997	510	9.54
Fran and Niles fight over who will receive the weekend off. Fran wins, and Niles accuses her of seducing Maxwell to get her way. He allies with C.C. as revenge against Fran. Niles and Fran reconcile, and he suggests that Fran take the Sheffields to the Fine Family Reunion at Niagara Falls, adding that it is the perfect place for Maxwell to propose, and a solution that will give them both the weekend off. Fran doesn't hear Maxwell's proposal over the roar of the waterfall. He slips and falls, with no recollection of what happened.
112	11	"Rash to Judgment"	Dorothy Lyman	Ivan Menchell	January 7, 1998	513	10.79
Val has tickets to see Michael Bolton so Fran asks Mr. Sheffield to be her date. However, before the evening begins she develops a huge rash. During the date, she and Maxwell go to their hotel room where she stalls by distracting Maxwell with a call to Gracie. While Maxwell is on the phone, Fran goes to the hospital where she receives an injection for the rash. When she returns to the hotel, she realizes that she is bloated as a reaction to the shot, so her plans with Maxwell for the night are postponed. She finds out that the pumpkin tortilini soup Sylvia served her earlier caused the rash.
113	12	"One False Mole and You're Dead"	Dorothy Lyman	Frank Lombardi	January 14, 1998	511	10.29
Margo Lang (guest star Joan Van Ark) is the star of Maxwell's new play and Fran, Maxwell and C.C. learn that Margo's famous mole is fake. Maxwell warns Fran that if she tells anyone, it will ruin the play. Of course, Fran doesn't listen and tells her mother, not knowing that a famous gossip columnist is eavesdropping on their conversation. Once the columnist spreads the news, Maxwell orders Fran to apologize to Margo Lang and afterwards, comes up with a brilliant idea: to sell fake beauty marks on the internet. When Maxwell blabs and ruins Fran's chances at becoming famous he rashly proposes to Fran, who turns it down, although Max isn't sure he wanted her to.
114	13	"Call Me Fran"	Fran Drescher	Diane Wilk	January 21, 1998	512	10.76
Fran decides to take her father to a basketball game, but he refuses to go, knowing the tickets came from Mr. Sheffield. Confused, Fran goes to Dr. Miller for advice, and he tells her she's always looking for men like her father – that will keep a distance between them. Fran decides then to make Mr. Sheffield change, and when that doesn't work, she decides to quit her job and change herself. Not wanting to let her go, Mr. Sheffield calls her Fran. Although they agree on not doing it in front of others yet, Max and Fran take their first step on the road of commitment.
115	14	"Not Without My Nanny"	Dorothy Lyman	Nastaran Dibai & Jeffrey B. Hodes	January 28, 1998	514	9.33
A school friend invites Gracie to fly to his palace in Koorestan (a parody on Kurdistan). Fran tries to convince Maxwell to let Niles accompany Grace, so they can call each other by their first names all weekend, but Max needs Niles at home, so he sends Fran with Grace. There, she is flattered by all the luxury, and by the Sultan's resemblance to Mr. Sheffield. When the Sultan invites Fran to stay with him forever, she thinks he proposed, she declines. When she decides to return to New York, she is surprised to find that her passport and clothes are missing, and there are guards at her door. Meanwhile, Niles tricks C.C. by saying that it's Mr. Sheffield's birthday, and she uses his gift to look good, but Niles had tickets to Koorestan instead. Mr. Sheffield goes to Koorestan to rescue her, but turns out the Sultan only wanted Fran to be his nanny. Mr. Sheffield proclaims his love for Fran, and doesn't take it back!
116	15	"The Engagement"	Dorothy Lyman	Rick Shaw	March 4, 1998	515	12.41
Fran and Maxwell are thrilled to tell the family that he finally told her that he loves her, and this time he didn't take it back! Everybody is happy for her (except for C.C.) and congratulates Fran. Maxwell reveals to Niles that he bought an engagement ring and is going to propose to Fran that night. He, of course, can't keep a secret and tells Fran, who tells Sylvia, in a chain reaction that results in virtually everybody knowing about it. Maxwell asks Fran to invite her family over, because they're having a very important dinner at the Rainbow Room, and everyone should be there. All the Sheffield and Fine families gather and wait for Maxwell, who never arrives because he is mugged outside the theater. Afraid something happened, because he wouldn't just leave her waiting, Fran searches and finds Mr. Sheffield unconscious behind the theater knocked out by the thieves who stole his watch, his wedding ring and Fran's engagement ring. Nevertheless, he proposes to Fran.
117	16	"The Dinner Party"	Dorothy Lyman	Ivan Menchell	March 11, 1998	516	12.28
Maxwell decides to shop for a new ring for Fran, and Sylvia asks them to go to their uncle Stanley's, because he’s family. But once there, they change their minds and go to Cartier instead. Fran gets an astonishing ring and they are mentioned in the social column where Fran's name is misspelled as Fran Fone. But Fran starts to see that she might not be very well accepted among Maxwell's rich friends: she, Sylvia and Val are mistaken for ordinary people at a fancy clothing store, and at a dinner party Fran learns that everybody is ridiculing her behind her back. Hurt and afraid she might not be good enough for Maxwell, she goes to the park where she meets a shabbily-dressed man (Dick Martin). She offers him chicken and opens her heart for him, giving him her address and offering him to drop by anytime he feels hungry. The man later visits and Maxwell recognizes him as one of the richest men in the city. Because of Fran's kindness, he sponsors Maxwell's new play. Meanwhile, Sylvia gets Maxwell and the kids to call her "ma" and "nana"; Niles has fun by showing C.C. the engagement ring.
118	17	"Homie-Work"	Dorothy Lyman	Jayne Hamil	March 18, 1998	517	11.32
Fran decides that even though she's marrying Maxwell, she still wants to work and she decides to help with his new play. They must find a rapper and Fran gets Sammy's grandson, Erwin (Coolio), who she later learns is a gift wrapper. In major trouble, Fran must turn the nerdy gift wrapper, into a music rapper in less than 24–hours to prove to Mr. Sheffield that she isn't stupid. Meanwhile, C.C. feels left out and replaced by Fran, and Niles doesn't neglect the opportunity to tease her, until she finally snaps and is taken to a mental hospital.
119	18	"The Reunion Show"	Dorothy Lyman	Suzanne Gangursky & Sean Hanley	March 25, 1998	518	11.01
Fran attends her 21st high school reunion and is surprised to see that almost all her former classmates are getting divorced, while she just got engaged. Trying not to be affected by all the negativity, Fran discusses with Maxwell the little things of life as a couple - which side of the bed they sleep on, what to do on the weekends, and how many children they will have. That becomes an issue because Maxwell does not want anymore children, while Fran does. After realizing how much motherhood means to Fran, Maxwell says they will plan it in the future, leaving them plenty of time to practice. Meanwhile, Niles goes through depression without having Ms. Babcock around to berate; and Gracie gets scared that she will be sent to a boarding school after a friend tells her it happened after her dad married her stepmother.
120	19	"Immaculate Concepcion"	Dorothy Lyman	Story by : Fran Drescher & Robert Sternin; Teleplay by : Robert Sternin	April 1, 1998	520	11.69
Maxwell's father unexpectedly dies, and in his will he leaves everything to Concepción, a secret daughter he had with a flamenco dancer named Consuela (Liz Torres). C.C. is back from the sanatorium and doesn't miss the opportunity of terrifying Fran and trying to derail her wedding to Maxwell. Afraid that the Sheffields will go bankrupt, Fran visits Concepcion trying to persuade her to share the money with her siblings, but can't. Knowing what it feels like being poor, Fran tells Maxwell that she will understand if he decides to marry a rich woman in order to keep his lifestyle. C.C. offers herself to marry Maxwell, but his love for Fran is beyond money. Maxwell's later lawyer arrives with the news that Concepción decided to share her money because Fran made her feel like family. Niles plays tricks on C. C., making her doubt her own sanity.
121	20	"The Pre-Nup"	Peter Marc Jacobson	Frank Lombardi	April 29, 1998	519	10.88
Pressured by his family, Maxwell wants Fran to sign a pre-nup, which upsets her. She thinks he doesn't trust her and/or doesn't have faith their marriage will last. Unbelievably, Val opens her eyes to what's happening and how it’s to Fran's benefit to sign. Brighton has a roller-skating accident and is taken to the hospital, and Fran isn’t allowed in because she isn’t his legal guardian. So she disguises herself as a nun to see him. In the hospital room, Fran tells Brighton, Maggie and Gracie that she loves them like they were hers. After listening to that, Maxwell decides he doesn’t want Fran to sign any pre-nup, but the adoption papers that will make Fran the kids' mother. Meanwhile, C.C. sends a temporary replacement, who looks, walks, talks and acts just like her, for Niles' desperation - until she reveals her taste for men.
122	21	"The Best Man"	Dorothy Lyman	Rick Shaw	May 6, 1998	521	10.25
Maxwell's brother, Nigel, returns to throw him a bachelor party, and Fran is terrified because Maxwell doesn't know that she almost married Nigel a year–and–a–half earlier. She tries to keep the secret, but Nigel gets drunk at the party and reveals all to Maxwell just as Fran pops–out of the cake in a surprise. (Sylvia earlier confessed that Morty cancelled his wedding and ran off with the cake girl at his bachelor party - Sylvia!) Fran and Maxwell quarrel over Nigel's revelation, and cancel the wedding, until C.C. (under the influence of Prozac) tells Fran that "Maxwell didn't spend 5 years doing the one man show" and reveals one of his liaisons. Fran contacts Marla Maples, who had a quick fling with Maxwell a year and a half ago, to confront him. Fran and Maxwell finally realize they love each other and resume the wedding plans.
123	22	"The Wedding"	Peter Marc Jacobson	Caryn Lucas	May 13, 1998	522A-522B	16.73
124	23	"The Wedding"	Peter Marc Jacobson	Caryn Lucas	May 13, 1998	522A-522B	16.73
Fran is excited about the wedding and spends the night before her wedding at her parents' apartment because it is tradition that the groom not see the bride 24 hours before the wedding. On their way back from New Jersey where they went to pick up Fran's wedding night lingerie, Fran, Sylvia and Val get stuck in the middle of nowhere when Val's car gets a flat and she has no spare. Val's mom calls Mr. Sheffield and tells him that Fran and the ladies are missing. Fran spends her last night as a single woman at her mom's house, where Sylvia reads her a letter she wrote to Fran after she was born. Just a few moments before the wedding, Maxwell's sister Jocelyn tells Fran that the social differences between her and Maxwell will ruin their marriage as it did to hers. At the ceremony, Miss Babcock gives it one last shot by impersonating the bride, but fails. Fran doesn't show up at the altar, leaving everybody apprehensive about what happened. Sylvia goes to her dressing room and finds Fran crying on the couch. Maxwell arrives and Fran tells him that their marriage will never work and decides it will be better if they cancel it. Max tells Fran that what happened with his sister will not happen to them, because they love each other. The wedding proceeds (with Sylvia shooting a warning glare at C.C. and Jocelyn to silence whatever objections they would have had), and Fran and Maxwell are finally married. Guest Stars: Renee Taylor as Sylvia and Rachell Chagall as Val.
