= Penelope Windust =

American actress (1945–2022)

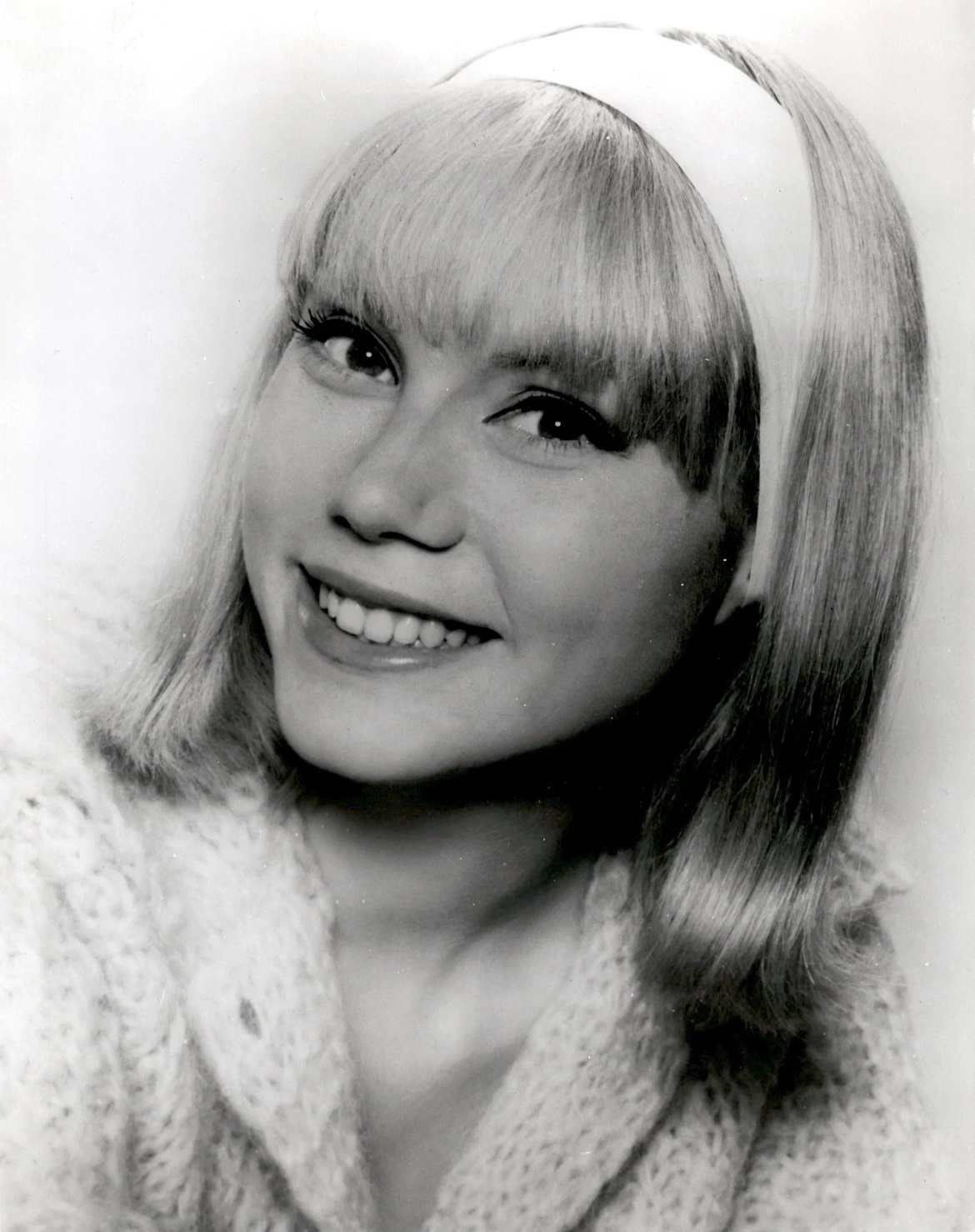
- Born: July 13, 1945; New York City, U.S.
- Died: February 2, 2022 (aged 76); Guilford, Connecticut, U.S.
- Occupation: Actress
- Years active: 1967–2008
- Children: 2

Penelope Marjorie Windust (July 13, 1945 – February 2, 2022) was an American television, film, and stage actress. She was known for her role as Kathleen Maxwell in the 1983 miniseries V.

== Biography ==
Windust began her career on Broadway, appearing in a 1967 production of Spofford with Melvyn Douglas, and in 1972 production of Elizabeth I. Windust has starred in many television movies. Her best-known film roles were in the movies Ghost Town and Bird in 1988. Her final movie appearance was You Don't Mess with the Zohan in 2008.

She made many guest appearances on television, including Hawaii Five-O, The Six Million Dollar Man, Falcon Crest, Dallas, Matlock, Criminal Minds, ER, Third Watch and Boston Legal. She died on February 2, 2022, at the age of 76.

== Filmography ==
=== Film ===
Year	Title	Role	Notes
1976	The Keegans	Pamela Voorhees Keegan	Television film
1976	The Call of the Wild	Rosemary	
1977	Tarantulas: The Deadly Cargo	Gloria Beasley	Television film
1981	Death Ray 2000	Emma Blessing	Television film
1982	Mother's Day on Waltons Mountain	Nurse Norris	Television film
1982	Johnny Belinda	Dr. Harris	Television film
1982	The Tragedy of Romeo and Juliet	Lady Capulet	
1984	Children in the Crossfire	TV Newswoman	Television film
1985	Scandal Sheet	—N/a	Television film
1988	Bird	Bellevue Nurse	
1988	Ghost Town	Grace	
1989	Flying Blind	Blonde Teacher	Television film
1989	Naked Lie	Alison Browning	Television film
1992	A Woman Scorned: The Betty Broderick Story	Dr. Miller	Television film
1992	The Nightman	Mrs. Fordyce	Television film
1993	Cooperstown	Receptionist	Television film
1994	Iron Will	Maggie Stoneman	
2008	McBride: Requiem	Celeste Clayton	Television film
2008	You Don't Mess with the Zohan	Second Woman in Cab	

=== Television ===
Year	Title	Role	Notes
1975	Mannix	Ruth O'Neill	1 episode
1975	Hawaii Five-O	Dr. Sheila Cramer	1 episode
1975	Ellery Queen	Anita Leslie/Cousin Lindsay	1 episode
1975	Emergency! S5Ep8	Jane Larson	1 episode
1976	The Six Million Dollar Man	Marlene Bekey	2 episodes
1977	Delvecchio	Estelle Richards	1 episode
1978	Husbands, Wives & Lovers	Mrs. Howard/Flo	2 episodes
1978	Wonder Woman	Dr. Sylvia Stubbs	1 episode
1978	Nero Wolfe	Laura Fromm	1 episode
1981	The Waltons	Bernadine Norris	1 episode
1982	Lou Grant	Josephine Bowers	1 episode
1983	V	Kathleen Maxwell	2 episodes
1983	Hotel	Elizabeth Stanton	1 episode
1985	Cover Up	Model	1 episode
1985	Finder of Lost Loves	Mrs. Murdock	1 episode
1982–85	Falcon Crest	Doctor	4 episodes
1986	Dallas	Mrs. Crane	2 episodes
1987	MacGyver	Connie Thornton	1 episode
1988	Matlock	Donna Stewart	1 episode
1989	1st & Ten: The Championship	Rebecca	1 episode
1990	China Beach	Jean Winslow	1 episode
1992	Doogie Howser, M.D.	Dr. Joanna Fields	1 episode
1992	Civil Wars	Rita Sawyer	1 episode
1992	Married... with Children	Sales Lady	1 episode
1993	Reasonable Doubts	Elaine Curtis	1 episode
1993	Murder, She Wrote	Laura Bennett	1 episode
1996	High Incident	—N/a	1 episode
1997	ER	Mrs. Martineau	1 episode
2002	Third Watch	Crazy Lady	1 episode
2004	Boston Legal	Martha Silver	1 episode
2005	Criminal Minds	Lynette Giles	1 episode
2006	Smith	Dental Receptionist	1 episode

== Stage credits ==
Year	Title	Role	Director	Notes
1967	Spofford	Geneva	Herman Shumlin	
1972	Elizabeth I	Elizabeth the Player Queen	John-Michael Tebelak	
