= Albert Campbell (dogsled racer) =

Canadian musher and trapper (1894-1961)

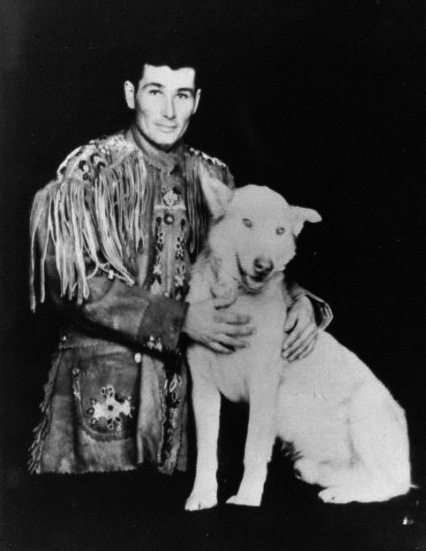

Personal information
- Born: 17 April 1894 The Pas, Manitoba, Canada
- Died: November 30, 1961 (aged 67) Manitoba, Canada
- Resting place: Winnipeg, Manitoba, Canada
- Occupation(s): Trapper, musher

Sport
- Country: Canada
- Sport: Sled dog racing

Achievements and titles
- National finals: 1916 The Pas Dog Derby (1st); 1917 Red River Derby (1st)

Albert Campbell (17 April 1894 – 30 November 1961) was a French-Cree (Métis) Canadian musher and trapper. He gained popularity as a Canadian "national hero" after winning the 1917 Red River Derby sled dog race.

== Life ==
Campbell was born in The Pas, Manitoba to the family of a Cree father John Campbell (1875 – 1917) and a French mother Adeline Beauchamp (1877 – ?). He won The Pas Dog Derby in 1916, the first annual of 150 miles (240 km) long dog sled race held in his hometown as a part of Northern Manitoba Trappers' Festival.

However, he became best known in 1917 for winning the Red River Derby, the Winnipeg – Saint Paul 522 miles (840 km) dog sled race, which was part of the Saint Paul Winter Carnival organized by the Saint Paul Outdoor Sports Carnival Association from 27 January to 3 February 1917. His younger brother Gabriel, who also competed in the race, finished in fourth place. According to Campbell, his father had died two weeks before the race started, and his last words were "win that race, my boy." The race gained such widespread popularity that the Canadian government was reporting the news of the Campbell brothers' progress to the Canadian troops fighting overseas in the First World War.

Albert Campbell died on 30 November 1961. He is buried at Saint Mary's Cemetery in Winnipeg, Manitoba.

== In popular culture ==
The 1994 Disney film Iron Will, is based on Campbell's American competitor in the 1917 race, Fred Hartman, although the fictionalized protagonist features some elements of Campbell's story (for example, the death of his father shortly before winning the race). The film features two Native American racers, but depicts them coming in second and third places.

== Sources ==
- Jarchow, Merrill E. (Winter 1971). "Hapless Hero: Frederick S. Hartman and the Winnipeg-to-St. Paul Dog Race". Minnesota History. 42 (8): 282–294. ISSN 0026-5497.
- Lambert, Sue (1983). Allen, Sydney J. (ed.). The Pas: gateway to northern Manitoba. The Pass: The Pas Historical Society. pp. 128–129. ISBN 088925415X.
- Mortensen, Debra J. (2010). Elk River. Charleston, SC: Arcadia Publishing. ISBN 978-0738577203.
- "The 1917 Winnipeg-St. Paul Dogsled Race". Historically Speaking. Becker, MN: Sherburne County Historical Society. Winter 2004. OCLC 18889297. Archived from the original on 2014-07-14.
