= George Gerdes (actor) =

American singer-songwriter and character actor (1948–2021)

- Born: February 23, 1948; Queens, New York, U.S.
- Died: January 1, 2021 (aged 72); Glendale, California, U.S.
- Education: Carnegie Mellon University

George Gerdes (February 23, 1948 – January 1, 2021) was an American singer-songwriter and character actor.

== Early life and education ==
He was born in Queens, New York City. He formed a group, the Alumicron Fab Tabs, with friend Loudon Wainwright III, before graduating from Carnegie Mellon University in 1969.

== Career ==
In the early 1970s, he recorded two albums, Obituary and Son of Obituary, for United Artists Records. His songs were praised by Joni Mitchell and Terre Roche, among others. His second album was produced by Nik Venet and featured session musicians including Charlie McCoy and Kenny Buttrey.

To supplement his income from performing, he started taking acting jobs in the 1980s. He appeared in Sam Shepard's play Fool for Love, and Aaron Sorkin's A Few Good Men, both on Broadway. He also appeared in many television and film roles, including parts in The Squeeze (1987), Miami Vice (1987), Single White Female (1992), Amistad (1997), Hidalgo (2004) and The Girl With the Dragon Tattoo (2011).

== Personal life ==
Gerdes died from a brain aneurysm in Glendale, California, on January 1, 2021, at the age of 72.

== Filmography ==
=== Film ===
Year	Title	Role	Notes
1968	Come Back Baby	Thief	
1987	The Squeeze	Joe	
1988	Call Me	Fred	
1989	Jacknife	Tony	
1992	Single White Female	Super	
1993	Boiling Point	Henderson	
1994	Iron Will	Borg Guillarson	
1996	Playing Dangerous 2	Mitch	
1997	Amistad	Marshal	
1998	Spark	Earl	
1998	Hijack	Luke Besser	
1999	Stealth Fighter	Alexander Chez / Clancy	
1999	Bats	Chaswick	
2004	Hidalgo	Major Whitside	
2005	Buckaroo: The Movie	Chalker	
2005	Rumor Has It	Charity Dinner Guests	
2007	TV Virus	Frank	
2011	The Passing	George Naibert	
2011	Answers to Nothing	Mr. Callahan	
2011	The Girl with the Dragon Tattoo	Udevalla Detective	
2013	Saving Lincoln	Copperhead Democrat	
2020	The 11th Green	Dwight D. Eisenhower	

=== Television ===
Year	Title	Role	Notes
1985	Our Family Honor	Pete Taylor	Episode: "Homecoming"
1987	Miami Vice	FBI Agent	Episode: "Heroes of the Revolution"
1987	As the World Turns	Chuck	Episode #1.8285
1987	The Equalizer	Russian Spy	Episode: "Encounter in a Closed Room"
1988	Spenser: For Hire	Ed	Episode: "Watercolors"
1990	Hunter	The Chemist	Episode: "La Familia"
1992	Brooklyn Bridge	Referee	Episode: "On the Line"
1992	L.A. Law	Detective Navie	Episode: "Silence of the Lambskins"
1992	Seinfeld	Man #1	Episode: "The Bubble Boy"
1993	Attack of the 50 Ft. Woman	Pilot #1	Television film
1994	NYPD Blue	Louis Foreman	Episode: "Jumpin' Jack Fleishman"
1994	The X-Files	Reverend Calvin Hartley	Episode: "Miracle Man"
1994	Amelia Earhart: The Final Flight	Itasca Radio Operator	Television film
1994	Rebel Highway	Lt. Clark	Episode: "Jailbreakers / Rebelles"
1994	Perry Mason: The Case of the Grimacing Governor	Donovan	Television film
1995	Vanishing Son	Billy Baker	Episode: "Holy Ghosts"
1995	Renegade	'Preacher' Lomax	Episode: "Ace in the Hole"
1996	Nowhere Man	Sheriff Wilkes	2 episodes
1996	Picket Fences	Homeless Victim	Episode: "Liver Let Die"
1996, 1999	Chicago Hope	Alex / Anton Zona	2 episodes
1997	Brooklyn South	Defense Attorney Calloway	Episode: "Touched by a Checkered Cab"
1998	Walker, Texas Ranger	Scudder	Episode: "The Wedding: Part 2"
1998	The Practice	Gun Manufacturer	Episode: "The Defender"
1999	7th Heaven	Jeff Patterson	Episode: "With Honors"
2000	Nash Bridges	Douglas Bremer	Episode: "Liar's Poker"
2000	Pensacola: Wings of Gold	Col. Walters	Episode: "Article 32"
2000	Cover Me	Mr. Howard	Episode: "The Line"
2001	Family Law	Mark Brown	Episode: "Planting Seeds"
2003	The District	Elevator Maintenance Man	Episode: "Blindsided"
2004	Alias	Analyst	Episode: "Full Disclosure"
2004	Line of Fire	Chief Wood	Episode: "The Senator"
2004	Cold Case	Warden Wilbur	Episode: "The House"
2005	Numbers	Rail Cop Captain	Episode: "Sabotage"
2006	Threshold	Mr. Wheeler	Episode: "Outbreak"
2006	What About Brian	Bartender	Episode: "What About Second Chances"
2007	ER	Jim Riley	2 episodes
2008	General Hospital	Bodie Sullivan	Episode #1.11572
2009	The Unit	Detective	Episode: "The Spear of Destiny"
2009	Lost	Mr. Springer	Episode: "The Incident"
2009	True Blood	Sid Matt Lancaster	Episode: "Nothing But the Blood"
2011	Bones	Dan Lambert	Episode: "The Sin in the Sisterhood"
2011	Castle	Mike Yanavich	Episode: "Knockout"
2011	Dexter	Landlord	Episode: "The Angel of Death"
2011	Criminal Minds	Lieutenant Shockley Tawes	Episode: "Self Fulfilling Prophecy"
2012	NCIS: Los Angeles	Floyd Hobbs	Episode: "Neighborhood Watch"
2013	The Mentalist	Miles MacCambridge	Episode: "The Red Barn"
2015	NCIS	Field Marshal Rand	Episode: "Spinning Wheel"
2017–2019	Bosch	Ray Scales	3 episodes
2020	Grey's Anatomy	Norman Sholman	Episode: "Save the Last Dance for Me"
2020	Perry Mason	Old Polish Man	Episode: "Chapter Six"
