= The Nanny =

American television sitcom (1993–1999)

- Genre: Sitcom
- Created by: Peter Marc Jacobson; Fran Drescher
- Developed by: Robert Sternin; Prudence Fraser
- Showrunner: Peter Marc Jacobson
- Starring: Fran Drescher; Charles Shaughnessy; Daniel Davis; Lauren Lane; Nicholle Tom; Benjamin Salisbury; Madeline Zima; Renée Taylor; Rachel Chagall; Ann Morgan Guilbert
- Theme music composer: Ann Hampton Callaway (Pilot episode: Cy Coleman and Dorothy Fields)
- Opening theme: "The Nanny Named Fran", written and performed by Ann Hampton Callaway (performed with Liz Callaway)
- Ending theme: "The Nanny Named Fran" (instrumental)
- Composer: Timothy Thompson
- Country of origin: United States
- Original language: English
- No. of seasons: 6
- No. of episodes: 146 (list of episodes)

Production
- Executive producers: Peter Marc Jacobson (pilot episode, seasons 2–6); Robert Sternin (seasons 1–4); Prudence Fraser (seasons 1–4); Fran Drescher (seasons 4–6); Diane Wilk (seasons 4–6); Frank Lombardi (season 6); Caryn Lucas (season 6)
- Camera setup: Videotape; Multi-camera
- Running time: 22–24 minutes
- Production companies: Sternin & Fraser Ink Inc.; Highschool Sweethearts Productions (seasons 3–6, starting with "Dope Diamond"); TriStar Television

Original release
- Network: CBS
- Release: November 3, 1993 – June 23, 1999

The Nanny is an American television sitcom. It originally aired on CBS from November 3, 1993, to June 23, 1999, starring Fran Drescher as Fran Fine, a Jewish fashionista from Flushing, Queens, who becomes the nanny to three children from an Anglo-American upper-class family in New York City. The show was developed by Robert Sternin and Prudence Fraser, and created and produced by Drescher and her then-husband Peter Marc Jacobson, taking much of its inspiration from Drescher's personal life growing up, involving names and characteristics based on her relatives and friends. The series was produced by Sternin & Fraser Ink Inc., Highschool Sweethearts Productions (seasons 3–6) and TriStar Television.

The show earned a Rose d'Or, and one Emmy Award, out of a total of twelve nominations; Drescher was twice nominated for a Golden Globe and an Emmy. The sitcom was the first new show delivered to CBS for the 1993 season and the highest-tested pilot at the network in years. The series was hugely successful internationally, especially in Australia, where it was one of the highest-rated programs of the decade. The Nanny has been called "the '90s version of I Love Lucy" and "well written and entertaining." The sitcom has also spawned several foreign adaptations, loosely inspired by the original scripts.

== Plot ==
Fran Fine (Drescher) turns up on the New York City doorstep of British Broadway producer Maxwell Sheffield (Charles Shaughnessy) peddling cosmetics after being dumped, and subsequently fired, by her bridal-shop-owner ex-boyfriend. Reluctantly, Mr. Sheffield instead hires Fran to be the nanny of his three children, Maggie, Brighton, and Gracie. In spite of his initial misgivings, Fran turns out to be just what he and his family needed.

While Fran manages the children, acerbic British butler Niles (Daniel Davis) manages the household and watches all the events that unfold with Fran as the new nanny. Niles, recognizing Fran's gift for bringing warmth back to the family (as Maxwell is a widower), does his best to undermine Maxwell's business partner C.C. Babcock (Lauren Lane), who has her eye on the very available and desirable Mr. Sheffield. Niles is often seen making witty comments directed toward C.C., with her replying in a similarly witty fashion, in their ongoing game of one-upmanship.

As the series progresses, it becomes increasingly obvious that Mr. Sheffield is smitten with Fran, although he will not admit it, and Fran is clearly smitten with him. The show teases the viewers with their closeness, featuring many "near-misses" and moments of jealousy, as well as an engagement. In the final episode of season 5, the two do finally marry, and they expand their family in season 6 by having fraternal twins named Jonah and Eve. Later in the series, it is also clear that Niles and C.C.'s constant sharp barbs are their own bizarre form of flirtation and affection; after a few false-starts (including multiple impulsive and failed proposals from Niles), the pair marry in the same delivery room where Fran is giving birth to the twins, and subsequently discover they, too, are expecting a child.

== Episodes ==
Season	Episodes	Originally released		Rank	Rating (Note: Ratings figures for seasons 5 and 6 are in viewers (millions), not household figures.)
Season	Episodes	First released	Last released	Rank	Rating
1	22	November 3, 1993	May 16, 1994	65	9.5
2	26	September 12, 1994	May 22, 1995	25	12.5
3	27	September 11, 1995	May 20, 1996	16	12.5
4	26	September 18, 1996	May 21, 1997	46	9.1
5	23	October 1, 1997	May 13, 1998	50	11.5
6	22	September 30, 1998	June 23, 1999	84	9.3

== Characters ==
=== Main characters ===
- Francine "Fran" Joy Fine (later Sheffield) is a nasal-voiced, outgoing woman from Flushing, Queens. At first, she works with boyfriend Danny Imperialli in a bridal shop but is dumped and dismissed. Fran ends up meeting Maxwell Sheffield and his family while going door to door to sell cosmetics. She winds up as the nanny to Mr. Sheffield's three children: Maggie, Brighton, and Gracie. Her character has an outgoing and humorous personality. As a result of her mother's overbearing personality, Fran often feels the need to date and is compelled to get married as well. She is usually seen getting into trouble and having to solve those problems through using her street smarts.
- Maxwell Beverly Sheffield is a Broadway producer who hires Fran to watch over his three children. He lost his wife Sara four years before the start of the series. While he does have some success as a producer, he remains constantly in the shadow of his rival Andrew Lloyd Webber, who always seems to have the upper hand. He does not spend a lot of time with his children due to his busy schedule, hence the need for a nanny in the first place. Despite his mutual attraction to Fran, he tries to keep their relationship professional for fear of commitment. However, in season 5 episode 14, Maxwell tells Fran that he loves her and does not take it back, having done so earlier; the couple's engagement follows, ending the romantic tension between them. Following several snafus, they are finally married in the season 5 finale.
- Niles is the loyal butler and chauffeur for the Sheffields. He and Maxwell have known each other their whole lives. He bonds with Fran immediately, viewing her as the breath of fresh air that the Sheffield family needs. Niles is known as the household snoop as he is constantly seen listening in on conversations via intercoms, keyholes, and even in the very rooms where the conversations are taking place. He tends to manipulate events in Fran's favor to undermine C.C., his nemesis. In spite of this, over time it becomes clear that Niles has himself fallen for C.C. and their contentious relationship is a cover for a mutual attraction.
- Chastity Claire "C.C." Babcock is the egocentric business partner of Maxwell Sheffield, with whom she has been working for almost 20 years. She clearly wants him as more than a business partner. Maxwell, however, appears oblivious to her feelings, and C.C.'s serious moves on him are thwarted by this, or by his longtime butler Niles. A running gag is that she cannot remember the names of Maxwell's children, in spite of having known them their entire lives. From her first meeting with Fran, she accurately views the newly hired nanny as a threat and tries to undermine her. Fran is not C.C.'s only enemy in the Sheffield house, as she has an even more contentious relationship with Niles (who hates her just as much as she hates him). In spite of this, over time it becomes clear that C.C. has herself fallen for Niles and their continual barbs towards each other are covering for a mutual attraction. Throughout the series she is referred to only as "C.C.", with her full name – Chastity Claire – revealed only in the last few minutes of the series finale.
- Margaret "Maggie" Sheffield (later Brolin) is the eldest child of Maxwell Sheffield. She is constantly seen bickering with her brother, Brighton, who views her as a nerd. Her relationship with her sister Gracie is generally much warmer. At the beginning of the series, Maggie is shy and awkward but, with Fran's influence, she becomes a somewhat popular young woman. Upon meeting Fran, the two bond almost instantly, with Fran behaving like a friend or sister except on the rare occasions that Maggie needs to be disciplined. Near the end of the series, Maggie meets and marries an underwear model, Michael Brolin.
- Brighton Milhouse Sheffield is the middle child of the family and the only son of Maxwell Sheffield. Due to being the only son, he often feels left out. This causes him to purposely bring about trouble for his two sisters. He does not bond with Fran at first, having disliked all his previous nannies, but eventually becomes close with her as well. He variously plans to become a Broadway producer, like his father, or to simply wait until he can access his trust fund so he does not have to work.
- Grace "Gracie" Sheffield is the youngest and arguably most intelligent of the Sheffield children. At the start of the series, Gracie was undergoing psychotherapy frequently, but under Fran's influence and guidance, she quickly reaches the point where she does not need it at all. As a result, however, she has a habit of naming medical conditions and using complicated words that Fran and Maxwell barely understand. This behavior is contrasted by her tendency to pick up some of Fran's faux-Yinglish slang and dressing habits.

=== Supporting characters ===
- Sylvia Fine (née Rosenberg) is the mother of Fran Fine, portrayed in early seasons by Fran Drescher (in flashbacks to Fran's childhood). Sylvia is based on Drescher's real-life mother.
- Val Toriello is Fran's best friend since attending kindergarten through high school together in Flushing, Queens, New York. When the show began, Val had been working at the bridal shop with Fran. Val is of Italian descent.
- Yetta Rosenberg-Jones is Fran's grandmother and the mother of Sylvia and Uncle Jack. The character was played by actress Ann Morgan Guilbert. Yetta is based on Drescher's real-life maternal grandmother.

== Cast ==
=== Main ===
The Nanny maintained an ensemble cast, keeping the same set of characters for its entire six-season run.

- Fran Drescher as Fran Fine
- Charles Shaughnessy as Maxwell Sheffield
- Daniel Davis as Niles
- Lauren Lane as C.C. Babcock
- Nicholle Tom as Maggie Sheffield
- Benjamin Salisbury as Brighton Sheffield
- Madeline Zima as Gracie Sheffield

=== Supporting ===
- Renée Taylor as Sylvia Fine
- Rachel Chagall as Val Toriello
- Ann Morgan Guilbert as Yetta Rosenberg

=== Guest stars ===
Although largely operating around the main ensemble cast, The Nanny featured an enormous number of guest stars over the years. Notable repeat guests included Lainie Kazan as Fran's paternal aunt Freida, Steve Lawrence as Fran's never before seen father Morty Fine, Pamela Anderson as Fran's bubble-headed nemesis Heather Biblow, Jonathan Penner as Fran's old boyfriend Danny Imperiali, Ray Charles as Yetta's fiancé Sammy, Spalding Gray as Fran's therapist Dr. Jack Miller, Fred Stoller as the frequently featured pharmacist Fred, and Andrew Levitas as Maggie's boyfriend Michael. Several celebrities guested as characters in single episodes, such as Jason Alexander, John Astin, Roseanne Barr as Fran's cousin Sheila, Eric Braeden, Margaret Cho, Joan Collins as Maxwell's stepmother, Jeanne Cooper, Cloris Leachman, Dina Merrill as Maxwell's mother, Rita Moreno, George Murdock, Wallace Shawn, Twiggy as Maxwell's sister (in her first appearance, in season 1), Robert Urich, Joan Van Ark, Robert Vaughn as Maxwell's father, Efrem Zimbalist Jr. and Robert Culp as C.C.'s father, Stewart.

Others appeared as themselves, primarily in connection with Maxwell's business relations, such as Dan Aykroyd, Bob Barker, Carol Channing, Chevy Chase, Andrew Dice Clay, Billy Ray Cyrus, Lesley-Anne Down, Erik Estrada, Eydie Gormé, Hugh Grant, Elton John, Richard Kline, Joe Lando, Shari Lewis and Lamb Chop, Bette Midler, Shemar Moore, Joshua Morrow, Lynn Redgrave, Melody Thomas Scott, Jane Seymour, Dame Elizabeth Taylor, Alex Trebek and Hunter Tylo; media personalities Roger Clinton, Whoopi Goldberg, Jay Leno, David Letterman, Alicia Machado, Rosie O'Donnell, Sally Jessy Raphael and Donald Trump; and musicians Burt Bacharach, Michael Bolton, Ray Charles, rapper Coolio, Celine Dion, Eartha Kitt, Patti LaBelle, Steve Lawrence, Lisa Loeb, and Brian Setzer. James Marsden also appeared as Maggie's boyfriend, Eddie, and Telma Hopkins appeared as Fran's "mother" in the episode "Fran's Roots". Scott Baio also made an appearance as a rookie doctor who was Fran's former schoolmate. Marvin Hamlisch appeared as Fran's former high school music teacher, a Hamlisch look-alike. Jon Stewart portrayed a Jewish love interest of Fran's until it was discovered at a family wedding that the two were cousins; on the June 29, 2011, airing of The Daily Show, Stewart stated he agreed to make an appearance after receiving a personal call from Drescher.

Drescher also reprised her role of Bobbi Fleckman from the 1984 film This Is Spinal Tap and made a cameo appearance as herself in the third to last episode. Shaughnessy had a double role as a fictional Middle Eastern oil potentate in one episode. Drescher's real-life parents initially appeared as a couple in the waiting room of Gracie's therapist and made subsequent appearances as Fran's Uncle Stanley and Aunt Rose; her Pomeranian Chester appeared as C.C.'s pet in more than a dozen episodes. Renée Taylor's husband, actor Joseph Bologna, and their son Gabriel Bologna had guest roles on the show. Ray Romano appeared as Fran's former high school classmate Ray Barone, linking The Nanny with his comedy Everybody Loves Raymond. Romano and Drescher both actually knew each other in high school. Tom Bergeron appeared as himself, the host of Hollywood Squares, in an episode in which Maxwell appeared as a star on the show's board as a replacement for Andrew Lloyd Webber. Tyne Daly appeared as a fellow nanny facing forced retirement. David Letterman made an uncredited appearance during a fantasy sequence, where Fran describes how she exaggerated her fame to impress a pen pal. Donna Douglas, who played Elly Mae Clampett on The Beverly Hillbillies, made her last television appearance in an episode.

== Theme song and opening credits ==
The theme song featured in the pilot was a version of "If My Friends Could See Me Now", performed by Gwen Verdon from the 1966 Broadway musical Sweet Charity. Following the pilot, the theme changed to "The Nanny Named Fran", written by Ann Hampton Callaway and performed by her and her sister Liz Callaway. Along with the change of the theme song came a different, animated opening sequence that would be used for the entire series run. Like the song, it summarizes the events that lead Fran from losing her job and boyfriend to being hired as nanny of the Sheffield children.

The sequence begins with Fran walking into the bridal shop, only to be kicked out. A taxicab takes her across the bridge from Queens to Manhattan, and she arrives at the Sheffield mansion to sell cosmetics. Maxwell opens the door and pulls Fran into the house. She falls into a flowerpot, where Niles dusts her off and puts a cap marked "Nanny" on her head. At her whistle, Maxwell's children fall in behind her and the four form a conga line. C.C. arrives at the door and Fran bumps it with her hip to close it in her face. Finally, the Sheffields, Niles and Fran gather on and around the couch for a group picture. However, the camera explodes when Fran triggers its shutter, covering everyone with soot and ruining their hair and clothes.

== Production ==
=== Development ===
The Nanny began in 1991 with a chance meeting on a transatlantic flight between Drescher and Jeff Sagansky, at the time president of CBS Corporation, for whom she had starred in the short-lived TV series Princesses. Drescher persuaded Sagansky to let her and her then-husband Jacobson pitch an idea for a sitcom to CBS. Sagansky agreed to a future meeting once all of the parties were back in Los Angeles; however, neither Drescher nor Jacobson had any idea what to pitch.

Later, Drescher was visiting friend Twiggy Lawson and her family in London, where she went on a culture-clash shopping tour with Lawson's then-teenage daughter. Drescher was inspired by her behavior towards the teenage daughter on the shopping trip as functioning in a less parental but "humorous [...] kind of Queens logic, self-serving advice" mode. Drescher immediately called her husband in Los Angeles with her sitcom idea, which she pitched as a spin on The Sound of Music, except, in Drescher's words, "Instead of Julie Andrews, I come to the door." Jacobson replied: "That could be it" and the idea for The Nanny was spawned.

Back in Los Angeles, the pair pitched their idea to Tim Flack and Joe Voci, both in comedy development at CBS. Sagansky brought in experienced producers Robert Sternin and Prudence Fraser, another husband-and-wife team with whom Drescher had worked before while guesting on Who's the Boss? in 1985 and 1986. Interested, both couples teamed up to write the script for the pilot together, creating a character with the intention to build off Drescher's image. "Our business strategy was to create a show that was going to complement our writing, complement me as a talent," Drescher said in a 1997 interview with The Hollywood Reporter. As a result, the characters draw deeply on the Drescher family, including Fran Fine's parents, Sylvia and Morty, and grandmother Yetta, who all were named after their real-life counterparts.

Drescher also drew from her own life in creating her character. Like the character in The Nanny, Drescher was born and raised to a Jewish family in Flushing, Queens, and attended beauty school. However, unlike her on-screen counterpart, Drescher never worked in a bridal shop; Drescher wrote that into the character as a tribute to her mother, who did work in a bridal shop. While visiting with his relatives in Fort Lauderdale around the holidays, Sagansky watched a few episodes with his relatives, realized that he had a hit, and ordered a full 22 episodes for the first season.

=== Crew ===
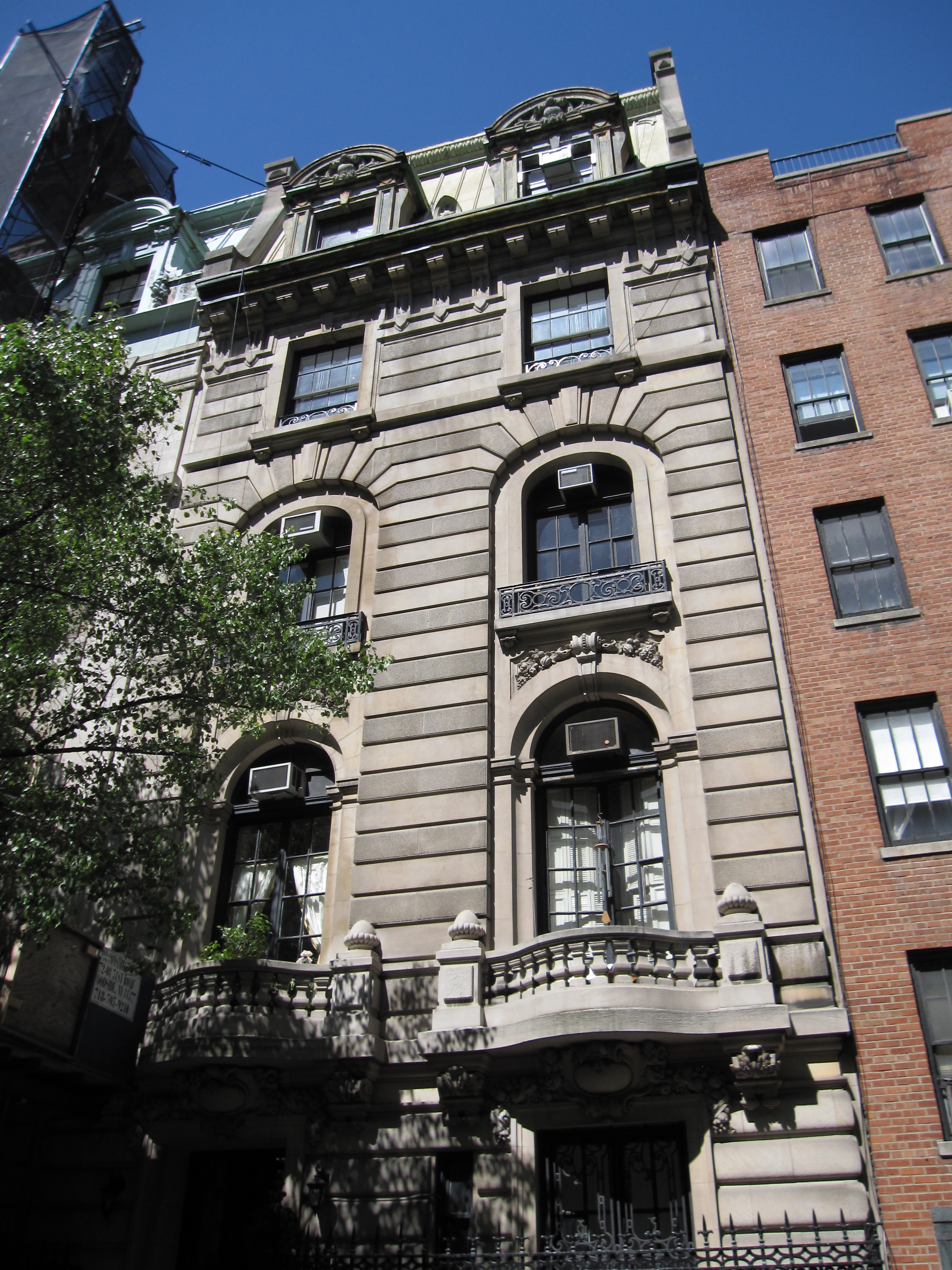
7 East 75th Street on the Upper East Side of New York City was used for the exterior shots of the Sheffield townhouse.

Most of the early episodes of The Nanny were shot in front of a live studio audience on Stage 6 at the Culver Studios. On Mondays, the cast went through the script as a table read. On Tuesdays and Wednesdays, they rehearsed before the series' producers and executives. And, on Thursdays and Fridays, the series was shot using a multi-camera set-up in front of a live studio audience. During later seasons the taping was no longer performed before an audience due to the complexities of the fantasy sequences, costume changes, etc.

Nearly 100 crew members were involved in the shooting of a single episode. Although Drescher, Fraser, Jacobson and Sternin, the show's only executive producers for the first four seasons, coordinated "pretty much everything" at the beginning, according to Sternin, they eventually found their niche and in the following years, Drescher and Sternin decided to focus on writing story outlines, while Jacobson presided over the writing team, and Fraser observed the run-throughs. The four of them were later joined by Frank Lombardi, Caryn Lucas and Diane Wilk, who served as the series' executive producers throughout the fifth and sixth seasons.

=== Professional laughers ===
Stemming from a home invasion and attack she experienced in 1985, Fran Drescher requested the show to provide prescreened audiences, based upon her fear of having random strangers invited to the productions. The show hired Central Casting to gather a cast of "laughers" who would be recorded during taping. The audio track of the laughers would then be added to the episodes in post-production. Casting director Lisette St. Claire became the world's first "laugher wrangler" for this new type of service.

== Humor ==
The comedy in The Nanny was formulated with many running gags, which contributed heavily to the success of the series. Much of this formula was character-based, with all major characters possessing a specific trait or quirks that provided a source of parody for other characters. The conflicting elements of each character's own comedy were often played off against one another (Fran and Maxwell, Niles and C.C., Maggie and Brighton). Occasionally the characters would break the fourth wall and comment on the situations themselves, or Fran would comment to the audience or look into the camera. Other running gags are the many references to Beatles songs and the musicals Fiddler on the Roof and My Fair Lady. Most of the humor Fran uses is aimed toward a Jewish audience. She makes references to Yiddish words and teaches the Sheffield children to be stereotypical Jews. Much of this humor is featured in scenes including her mother, Sylvia.

At times, they would also make humorous references to the stars' previous careers or real-life off-screen time. This was noticeable when Yetta saw her reflection in the mirror and thought she was seeing Millie Helper from The Dick Van Dyke Show (the role that Guilbert played), Maxwell remembering how he wanted to hire a former cast member from Days of Our Lives but thought he was not "British" enough (a reference to Shaughnessy's former series), and C.C. using props to hide Lane's real-life pregnancy at the time. Drescher also appeared in the series as tough-talking music publicist Bobbi Fleckman, reprising her role from This Is Spinal Tap, setting up a visual gag where Fran would disguise herself as Fleckman in order to get Mr. Sheffield's attention. More running gags include Fran's frequent references to classic TV sitcoms (Gilligan's Island and Bewitched) and her many eccentric family members; Fran lying about her age—especially to men; Maxwell fighting through his rivalry with actual Broadway producer Andrew Lloyd Webber; Maxwell's physical resemblance to Pierce Brosnan; Maxwell's fondness for Kaye Ballard; and Sylvia loving food in excess.

In one episode Streisand's sister, Roslyn Kind appears singing a song with Fran thinking Barbra is at the Sheffield home. There was also the occasional tryst between Niles and C.C., contrasting with their typical open disdain for each other, which was actually love. Season 4 featured a running gag where both Fran and Maxwell kept secret from the other household members "The Thing" (Maxwell telling Fran he loves her in the season 3 finale). It is also following "The Thing" that whenever Maxwell makes comments denying he has feelings for Fran, she is temporarily "paralyzed". In addition, there is also a great deal of physical comedy in The Nanny including exaggerated falls and chases.

Drescher's facial expressions, when shocked or surprised, can also be seen as reminiscent of Lucille Ball's portrayals of Lucy Ricardo and Lucy Carmichael. The parallels were suggested in a few episodes, where an exasperated Mr. Sheffield refers to Fran as "Mrs. Carmichael", and asks in another: "Mr. Mooney fire you from the bank again?" Another Lucy reference is when he alludes to Fran and "Ethel" stealing John Wayne's footprints in Hollywood, and again when Maxwell says, "Miss Fine, you got some 'splaining to do!" like Ricky Ricardo often said to Lucy Ricardo. The episode that featured a visit from Elizabeth Taylor (who also appeared on Here's Lucy) began with Maxwell and Niles trying to hide the visit from Fran ("Boys, boys, boys. Now do you think my mother gave birth to a dummy 25 years ago?") followed by her gripe "You never introduce me to any of the stars that you know; I've got a good mind to take Little Ricky and... oh. Never mind." In another episode of The Nanny, Fran sees a man watching I Love Lucy on TV and as the theme song plays, she gets the idea to gain entry into Sheffield's men's only club dressed as a man.

== Broadcast ==
=== Domestic syndication ===
The show began off-network syndication in September 1997, distributed by Columbia TriStar Television Distribution on various broadcast television networks in the United States. The show aired on Lifetime from 2000 until 2008. It was also seen on Nick at Nite from April 2009 to October 5, 2013, in the United States, but was pulled and its timeslot of 6AM-7AM was replaced with Hangin' with Mr. Cooper. It also appears on The Hallmark Channel in the Philippines, Super RTL and VOX in Germany, and Go! and TV1 in Australia. On February 8, 2010, Drescher hosted a week-long marathon of The Nanny, titled "Valentine Schmalentine", on Nick at Nite.

The success of the stunt led to Fran hosting "Falling for Fran", a similar week-long Valentine's Day marathon in February 2011. On August 2, 2010, The Nanny began airing on TV Land, commencing with a week-long marathon and remained on the channel until 2016. On January 1, 2011, The Nanny began airing on Antenna TV, a new digital broadcast network. On August 16, 2011, it began airing on Logo. On January 1, 2018, Cozi TV started airing the show. Similarly, on April 30, 2018, Freeform began airing the series, showing 5-episode blocks in the early morning hours. It was then removed from the channel on September 30, 2018. Additionally, the show can be seen on local US television channels.

=== Streaming ===
The series' third and fourth seasons are available for streaming on Pluto TV, The Roku Channel rotates between seasons 1–2 and 3–4, and on April 1, 2021, the entire series became available on HBO Max. The entire series is also available to stream on Peacock as of March 18, 2024. As of early 2026 the entire series is available on Amazon Prime Video. The entire series is available to stream, for free with ads on the CTV app in Canada under the "Throwbacks" section. In 2021, Sony Pictures launched a channel dedicated to the show on YouTube and posted some episodes and clips of the show.

=== International syndication ===
Outside of North America, The Nanny is broadcast in various other countries and television networks, each with their own schedule for the series. In the United Kingdom, the entire series aired on the digital network Living. In France, the show was broadcast and rebroadcast the same multi-and was a huge success on the channel M6 then W9. The French title is Une nounou d'enfer ("A Hell of a Nanny"). In Italy Fran was in the dubbing became Francesca, an Italian from Ciociaria (a rural area). The Nanny airs include:

International syndication
Country / Region	Name	Television Network	Dubbing / Subtitles
Austria	Die Nanny (English: "The Nanny")	ORF1 (2005–present), ATV (2006–2010)	German
Australia	The Nanny	Network Ten (1994–1999), Nine Network (2007–2009), 9Go! (2009–2011, 2020–), GEM (2010–2011), 7flix (2016–2019), TV1 (1998–2013), TV Hits (2014), 111 (2014–2019)	None
Belgium	The Nanny	Eén, VT4, VIJF, VTM,	Dutch subtitles
Belgium	Une nounou d'enfer (English: "A Hell of a Nanny")	RTL-TV, Plug RTL (2011–2012)	French
Brazil	The Nanny	Rede Record, Rede 21, SET, Comedy Central (2012–present)	Portuguese dubbing
Canada	The Nanny	Crossroads Television System, CBC (November 3, 1993 – May 20, 1996), CTV Television Network (September 18, 1996 – June 23, 1999)	None
Catalonia	La Tata (English: "The Nanny")	TV3	Catalan dubbing
Costa Rica	La Niñera	Sony Entertainment Television	Spanish dubbing
Croatia	Dadilja (English: "Nanny")	RTL Televizija	Croatian subtitles
Czech Republic	Chůva k pohledání (English: "Nanny")	TV Prima	Czech dubbing
Denmark	Alletiders barnepige (English: "All-times greatest nanny")	TV3	Danish subtitles
Estonia	Nanny	TV3	Estonian subtitles
Finland	Nanny	Nelonen, The Voice	Finnish subtitles
France	Une nounou d'enfer (English: A Hell of a Nanny)	M6, W9, 6ter, TMC, TF1 Séries Films	French
Germany	Die Nanny (English: "The Nanny")	VOX (2002–2011), Super RTL (2007–2012), RTL (1995–2002), FOX Germany (2010–2012), ZDF neo (2012–2014), Disney Channel (2014–2021), RTLup (2021–present)	German dubbing
Greece	Ntanta amesou draseos (English: "Urgent nanny")	Mega, Alpha, Makedonia TV	Greek subtitles
Hungary	A dadus (English: "The Nanny")	TV2, RTL Klub, Cool TV	Hungarian
Israel	נני (English: "Nanny")	Channel 3	Hebrew subtitles
Italy	La tata (English: "The Nanny")	Canale 5 (1995), Italia 1 (1996–2000), Boing (2006), Mya (2008), Fox Life (2009), La5 (2011), Fox Retro (2011)	Italian dubbing
Latin America	The Nanny	Sony Entertainment Television (Latin America)	Spanish dubbing
Latvia	Auklīte (English: "Nanny")	Duo 6	Latvian dubbing
Lithuania	Auklė (English: "Nanny")	TV3	Lithuanian dubbing
Malaysia	The Nanny	TV2, Astro	Bahasa Malaysia subtitles
Mexico	The Nanny	Azteca 7, Sony Entertainment Television (Latin America)	Spanish dubbing
Netherlands	The Nanny	NPO1, RTL 5, NET5, RTL Lounge	Dutch subtitles
Norway	Nanny	TV3	Norwegian subtitles
Philippines	The Nanny	ABS-CBN, Studio 23	None
Poland	Niania / Pomoc domowa (English: "House helper")	TV Puls, Polsat, TVN 7	Polish
Portugal	Competente e Descarada (English: "Competent and shameless")	TVI	Portuguese Subtitles
Romania	Dădaca (English: "Nanny")	Pro TV, Pro Cinema	Romanian Subtitles
Russia	Моя прекрасная няня (English: "My Fair Nanny")	СТС, Domashny, ДТВ	Russian dubbing
Spain	La niñera (English: "The Nanny")	Antena 3 (2001), Telemadrid (1993–1999)	Spanish
Sweden	Nanny	TV3, TV4	Swedish subtitles
Switzerland	Die Nanny (English: "The Nanny")	SF zwei (2006–2008), 4+ (2015–present)	German
Switzerland	La Tata (English: "The Nanny")	RSI LA1	Italian
Thailand	The Nanny	Hallmark, TrueVisions	Thai
United Kingdom; Ireland	The Nanny	Sky One, Living TV, TLC and formerly RTÉ One	None

== Home media ==
Sony Pictures Home Entertainment has released seasons 1, 2 and 3 of The Nanny on DVD in regions 1, 2 and 4. Season 3 was released on March 17, 2009, in Region 1, almost three years after the release of season 2. On August 27, 2013, it was announced that Mill Creek Entertainment had acquired the rights to various television series from the Sony Pictures library, including The Nanny. They subsequently re-released the first two seasons on DVD on August 5, 2014.

On January 12, 2015, it was announced that Shout! Factory had acquired the rights to the series; they subsequently released a complete series set on May 26, 2015. It contains all 146 episodes. In late 2015, Shout! began releasing individual season sets; the fourth season was released on September 22, 2015, followed by the fifth season on December 22, 2015. The sixth and final season was released on March 15, 2016.

DVD name	# of Ep	Release dates				Special features
DVD name	# of Ep	Region 1	Region 2	Region 4	Region 0	Special features
The Nanny: The Complete First Season	22	July 12, 2005	August 9, 2005	July 13, 2005		Select Episode Commentaries by Fran Drescher; The Making of The Nanny
The Nanny: Season One	22	August 5, 2014				None
The Nanny: The Complete Second Season	26	May 2, 2006	June 8, 2006	May 10, 2006		None
The Nanny: Season Two	26	August 5, 2014				None
The Nanny: Seasons One & Two	48	May 26, 2015 (as part of the 19-disc The Nanny: The Complete Series)	TBA	TBA		Select Episode Commentaries by Fran Drescher
The Nanny: Seasons 1 & 2 (2-Season Combo Pack)	48	2014				
The Nanny: The Complete Third Season	27	March 17, 2009	March 5, 2009	March 11, 2009		None
The Nanny: Seasons One, Two & Three	75	May 26, 2015 (as part of the 18-disc The Nanny: The Complete Series)	TBA	TBA		Select Episode Commentaries by Fran Drescher
The Nanny: Seasons 1-3	75				Unknown date	
The Nanny: Season Four	26	September 22, 2015	TBA	TBA		None
The Nanny: Seasons Three & Four	53	May 26, 2015 (as part of the 19-disc The Nanny: The Complete Series)	TBA	TBA		None
The Nanny: Season Five	23	December 22, 2015	TBA	TBA		None
The Nanny: The Final Season	22	March 15, 2016	TBA	TBA		None
The Nanny: Seasons Five & Six	45	May 26, 2015 (as part of the 19-disc The Nanny: The Complete Series)	TBA	TBA		None
The Nanny: Seasons Four, Five & Six	71	May 26, 2015 (as part of the 18-disc The Nanny: The Complete Series)	TBA	TBA		None
The Nanny: The Complete Series (18 Discs)	146	May 26, 2015	TBA	TBA		Select Episode Commentaries by Fran Drescher
The Nanny: The Complete Series Bonus Disc	0	May 26, 2015 (as part of the 19-disc The Nanny: The Complete Series)	TBA	TBA		Executive Producers Fran Drescher and Peter Marc Jacobson in a New, Never-Before-Seen Interview; The Making of The Nanny
The Nanny: The Complete Series (19 Discs)	146	May 26, 2015	TBA	TBA		Select Episode Commentaries by Fran Drescher; Executive Producers Fran Drescher and Peter Marc Jacobson in a New, Never-Before-Seen Interview; The Making of The Nanny

== Reception ==
The show received positive critical reviews, with an 85% "fresh" rating on Rotten Tomatoes for the first season. The website's consensus reads: "Fran Drescher elevates The Nanny's formulaic writing with chutzpah, hairspray, and a one-of-a-kind comedic performance." However, the show performed poorly in its first year; when it was nearly cancelled, CBS executive Jeff Sagansky championed the show, citing the pilot's historically high test numbers. According to Jacobson: "At all those affiliate meetings, he used to say, 'Stick by The Nanny!' He knew it was something special."

Although later emerging as a favorite at CBS, sponsors questioned whether the writers had ventured too far in terms of ethnicity and Drescher acted too obviously Jewish. The actress, however, declined to change Fran Fine into an Italian American: "On TV, you have to work fast, and the most real, the most rooted in reality to me is Jewish. I wanted to do it closest to what I knew." By contrast, the producers came to the conclusion that to oppose her should be a family of British origin, so "she wouldn't come across as Jewish so much as the American you were rooting for," Sternin explained. "The idea was to make her the American girl who happens to be Jewish rather than the Jewish girl working for the WASPs."

=== Awards and nominations ===
Year	Award-giving Body	Award	Result
1994	Young Artist Awards	Youth Actress Leading Role in a Television Series (Nicholle Tom)	Nominated
1994	Young Artist Awards	Outstanding Youth Ensemble in a Television Series (Benjamin Salisbury, Nicholle Tom, Madeline Zima)	Nominated
1994	Young Artist Awards	Best New Television Series	Nominated
1995	Primetime Emmy Awards	Outstanding Individual Achievement in Costuming for a Series (Brenda Cooper, for 'Canasta Masta')	Won
1995	Primetime Emmy Awards	Outstanding Individual Achievement in Directing for a Comedy Series (Lee Shallat Chemel, for 'Canasta Masta')	Nominated
1995	Primetime Emmy Awards	Outstanding Individual Achievement in Hairstyling for a Series (Dugg Kirkpatrick, for 'Stock Tip')	Nominated
1995	Young Artist Awards	Best Performance by a Youth Ensemble in a Television Series (Benjamin Salisbury, Nicholle Tom, Madeline Zima)	Nominated
1995	Young Artist Awards	Best Performance by a Youth Actress – TV Guest Star (Jacqueline Tone)	Nominated
1995	Young Artist Awards	Best Performance by an Actress Under Ten in a TV Series (Madeline Zima)	Nominated
1996	American Comedy Awards	Funniest Female Performer in a TV Series (Leading Role) Network, Cable or Syndication (Fran Drescher)	Nominated
1996	BMI Film & TV Awards	BMI TV Music Award (Timothy Thompson)	Won
1996	Golden Globe Awards	Best Performance by an Actress in a TV-Series – Comedy/Musical (Fran Drescher)	Nominated
1996	Primetime Emmy Awards	Outstanding Costuming for a Series (Brenda Cooper, for 'The Kibbutz')	Nominated
1996	Primetime Emmy Awards	Outstanding Lead Actress in a Comedy Series (Fran Drescher)	Nominated
1996	Primetime Emmy Awards	Outstanding Supporting Actress in a Comedy Series (Renée Taylor)	Nominated
1996	Young Artist Awards	Best Performance by a Young Actor – TV Comedy Series (Benjamin Salisbury)	Won
1996	Young Artist Awards	Best Performance by a Young Actress – TV Comedy Series (Madeline Zima)	Nominated
1996	Young Artist Awards	Best Performance by a Young Actress – TV Comedy Series (Nicholle Tom)	Nominated
1997	Golden Globe Awards	Best Performance by an Actress in a TV-Series – Comedy/Musical (Fran Drescher)	Nominated
1997	Primetime Emmy Awards	Outstanding Costuming for a Series (Brenda Cooper, for 'The Rosie Show')	Nominated
1997	Primetime Emmy Awards	Outstanding Costuming for a Series (Shawn Holly Cookson and Terry Gordon, for 'The Facts of Lice')	Nominated
1997	Primetime Emmy Awards	Outstanding Lead Actress in a Comedy Series (Fran Drescher)	Nominated
1997	Satellite Awards	Best Performance by an Actress in a Television Series – Musical or Comedy (Fran Drescher)	Nominated
1998	Primetime Emmy Awards	Outstanding Lighting Direction (Electronic) for a Comedy Series (Jimmy E. Jensen, for 'The Wedding')	Nominated
1998	Primetime Emmy Awards	Outstanding Costuming for a Series (Shawn Holly Cookson and Terry Gordon, for 'Not Without My Nanny')	Nominated
1998	Young Artist Awards	Best Performance by a Young Actress – TV Comedy Series (Madeline Zima)	Nominated
1998	Young Artist Awards	Best Performance by a Young Actor – TV Comedy Series (Benjamin Salisbury)	Nominated
1999	NAACP Image Awards	Outstanding Supporting Actress in a Comedy Series (Whoopi Goldberg)	Nominated
1999	Primetime Emmy Awards	Outstanding Costuming for a Series (Shawn Holly Cookson and Terry Gordon, for 'Oh Say, Can You Ski?')	Nominated
1999	TeleVizier-Ring Gala, Netherlands	Silver TeleVizier-Tulip	Won
1999	TV Guide Award	Favorite Actress in a Comedy (Fran Drescher)	Nominated
1999	Young Artist Awards	Best Performance by a Young Actress – TV Comedy Series (Madeline Zima)	Nominated
1999	Young Artist Awards	Best Performance by a Young Actor – TV Comedy Series (Benjamin Salisbury)	Nominated
2008	TV Land Awards	Favorite Nanny (Fran Drescher)	Won
2019	Online Film & Television Association Hall of Fame	Television Program	Won

== Other media ==
=== Reunion specials ===
On December 6, 2004, the Lifetime network aired a reunion special The Nanny Reunion: A Nosh to Remember. The special reunited the entire cast with the exception of Davis, who had work commitments. Drescher and Gary Rosenthal served as executive producers of the special. In March 2020, Drescher announced that the cast would reunite for a live reading of the pilot episode amid the COVID-19 pandemic. The reading was released to YouTube by Sony Pictures Television on April 6, 2020. The reading featured the entire cast of the pilot—with the exception of James Marsden, who was replaced by Alex Sternin—as well as narration of the original pilot script by Jacobson and a live performance of the theme song by Ann Callaway.

=== Foreign adaptations ===
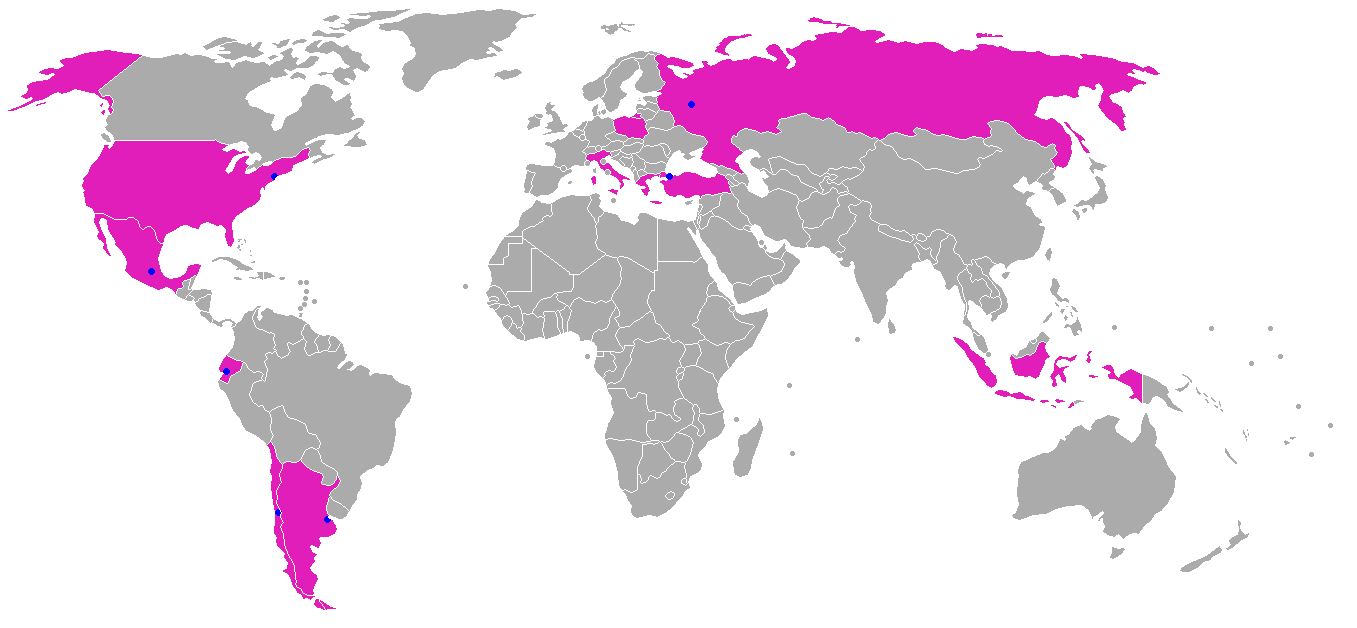
Countries with local versions

The Nanny was shown in more than eighty countries worldwide. In addition, several local versions of the show have been produced in other countries. These shows follow the original scripts very closely, but with minor alterations in order to adapt to their respective country's culture. The remake in Russia was so popular that some original American writers of the show were commissioned to write new scripts after all original episodes were remade.

=== Potential revival ===
In June 2018, regarding reviving the series, Drescher said, "We're talking about it. Peter and I are talking about it," Drescher told Entertainment Tonight, referencing her ex-husband, Peter Marc Jacobson, who co-created the series with her. "She would've maybe gotten involved in more things [that] Fran Drescher is involved with," the actress told Entertainment Tonight. "All kinds of things from environmental issues, to health, to civil liberties, that's what I think Fran [Fine] would be doing now – opening her big Queens mouth for the greater good."

=== Stage adaptation ===
On January 8, 2020, it was announced that Drescher and Jacobson were writing the book for a musical adaptation of the series. Rachel Bloom and Adam Schlesinger of Crazy Ex-Girlfriend fame were to write the songs, while Marc Bruni (Beautiful: The Carole King Musical) was slated to direct. Drescher will not portray the title role, as she joked that if she did "We'd have to change the title to The Granny." However, since Schlesinger's unexpected death from COVID-19, the status of the musical is unknown.

== See also ==
- List of television show franchises
