= Ghost Town (1988 film) =

American Western horror film

- Theatrical poster
- Directed by: Richard McCarthy (as Richard Governor)
- Written by: Duke Sandefur
- Story by: David Schmoeller
- Produced by: J. Larry Carroll
- Starring: Franc Luz; Catherine Hickland; Jimmie F. Skaggs; Bruce Glover
- Cinematography: Mac Ahlberg
- Edited by: King Wilder
- Music by: Harvey Cohen
- Production company: Empire Pictures
- Distributed by: Trans World Entertainment
- Release date: November 11, 1988
- Running time: 85 minutes
- Country: United States
- Language: English
- Box office: $75,000

Ghost Town is a 1988 American horror Western film directed by Richard McCarthy (under the pseudonym Richard Governor) and starring Franc Luz and Catherine Hickland. Based on a story by David Schmoeller, it follows a sheriff who finds himself amongst the dead residents of a ghost town while searching for a missing woman. The film was one of the last to be released by producer Charles Band's production company Empire Pictures.

== Plot ==
Kate (Catherine Hickland) is driving alone down a highway in Riverton, Arizona after having left her fiancé at the altar. While driving, she hears the noise of horses galloping outside her car, but sees no one. After pulling onto the side of the road, she is whisked away in a dust cloud and disappears.

Sheriff Langley (Franc Luz) is dispatched to Kate's abandoned car, found later that day. While pulled over, a man on a horse rides by and shoots at him. Langley exits the car, and a stray bullet hits the car's gas tank, causing the vehicle to explode. Langley wanders by foot, stumbling upon a ghost town off the main road. After falling asleep in an empty building, he awakens the next day to various apparitions that appear to be linked to the town's past. He meets a barmaid, Grace (Penelope Windust) and a blind gambling dealer (Bruce Glover), as well as a blacksmith and his daughter, Etta.

Meanwhile, Kate is being held captive by Devlin (Jimmie Skaggs), a zombie-like outlaw who has control over the town through a pact he made with Satan. Devlin terrorizes the souls of the town's residents, and kills both the blacksmith and Etta after they confide in Langley. Upon discovering his modern gun to be ineffective, Langley is given an old revolver by Grace, and finds that he is able to kill Devlin's henchmen with old bullets.

After finding Kate, Langley is hunted by Devlin's henchmen. The two hide in the abandoned church, which Devlin and his henchmen light on fire. However, Kate and Langley escape. Outside, Langley has a shootout with Devlin, during which Langley effectively destroys him. As he and Kate leave, the souls of the town's residents look on with approval, and the town disappears behind them.

== Cast ==
- Franc Luz as Langley
- Catherine Hickland as Kate
- Jimmie F. Skaggs as Devlin
- Penelope Windust as Grace
- Bruce Glover as Dealer
- Zitto Kazann as Blacksmith
- Blake Conway as Harper
- Laura Schaefer as Etta
- Michael Alldredge as Bubba

== Production ==
The script was written by Duke Sandefur, based on a story by David Schmoeller. The film was executive-produced by horror producer Charles Band.

Ghost Town was shot on location in late September and October 1987 at Old Tucson Studios in Tucson, Arizona. In a retrospective interview, actor Franc Luz recounted his time on the set of the film, stating that he had done his own stunts. On director Richard Governor [McCarthy], Luz said: "Richard Governor seemed like a crazy, high energy, highly sexed, charismatic guy with a strong Australian accent... At the time, I was not sure that he had complete control of his set, but I've since learned the no one ever has complete control of any set."

== Release ==
The film was released on November 11, 1988, in a limited release, only showing on eight screens. It opened the same day as United Artists's horror film Child's Play (1988), and grossed only USD$10,478 its opening weekend. It would go on to gross a total of USD$75,000.

=== Critical response ===
Ghost Town received middling reception from critics, with TV Guide calling it "a mixed bag of pretty pictures and stale storytelling," noting its cinematography and performances as strengths, but faulting the script for being too predictable. Chris Willman of the Los Angeles Times gave the film a negative review, writing in his review of the film: "Ghost Town (citywide) is likely to be greeted by plenty of Ghost Theaters in its brief theatrical run. What may be the world's first zombie western is spookily devoid of unexpected plot twists, basic frights or even a sense of its own internal supernatural logic. Eerie, that's what it is." The New York Daily News conceded that the film "exhibits more atmosphere, sincerity and visual style than the typical imitative Empire product," also praising the special effects, but felt it was "poorly plotted" and boasts uncharismatic characters.

Critic Leonard Maltin gave the film a positive review, writing: "[Ghost Town is an] imaginative fantasy thriller that has modern-day sheriff Luz chosen to rid a century-old town of its curse by avenging its dead sheriff in High Noon fashion. Fine special effects distinguish this modest sleeper." In a review published by Variety, it was noted: "Atmospheric lensing by Empire stalwart Mac Ahlberg on Tucson locations offers a pleasant relief from recent studiobound (in Rome) product from the late fantasy outfit," and the film was called an "odd variation on [a] familiar suspense format."

In a retrospective assessment, film journalist Glenn Kay wrote: "[Franc] Luz does manage to keep a straight face, but the end result is unremarkable."

== Home media ==
The film was released on VHS in 1988 through New World home video. It was never given a DVD release.

The film was released for the first time on Blu-ray by Scream Factory (licensed by Metro-Goldwyn-Mayer) on July 28, 2015. In a review of the Blu-ray in Diabolique Magazine, it was noted: "It seems as if Ghost Town was planned to be part of a double feature, because typically Scream Factory can be expected to put a little more work into their releases. If you are a big Empire [Pictures] fan, Ghost Town is probably a worthwhile pick up but short of that or loving western-horror hybrids, this isn't a must own. There's nothing egregious about it but it's hard to see this release getting a lot of praise; it's definitely one of the otherwise solid company's lesser releases."

== Sources ==
- Borseti, Francesco (2016). "Ghost Town". It Came from the 80s!: Interviews with 124 Cult Filmmakers. McFarland. ISBN 978-1-476-66604-4.
- Green, Paul (2016). Encyclopedia of Weird Westerns: Supernatural and Science Fiction Elements in Novels, Pulps, Comics, Films, Television and Games (2 ed.). McFarland. ISBN 978-1-476-66257-2.
- Kay, Glenn (2012). Zombie Movies: The Ultimate Guide. Chicago Review Press. ISBN 978-1-613-74422-2.
- Maltin, Leonard (2008). Leonard Maltin's 2009 Movie Guide. Signet. ISBN 978-0-451-22468-2.
- Weldon, Michael J. (1996). The Psychotronic Video Guide To Film. St. Martin's Griffin. ISBN 978-0-312-13149-4.
- Variety Film Reviews. Vol. 20. Garland. 1988. ISBN 9780835226677.
