= Iron Will =

1994 film by Charles Haid

- Theatrical release poster
- Directed by: Charles Haid
- Written by: John Michael Hayes; Djordje Milicevic; Jeff Arch
- Produced by: Patrick Palmer; Robert Schwartz
- Starring: Mackenzie Astin; Kevin Spacey; David Ogden Stiers
- Cinematography: William Wages
- Edited by: Andrew Doerfer
- Music by: Joel McNeely
- Production company: Walt Disney Pictures
- Distributed by: Buena Vista Pictures Distribution
- Release date: January 14, 1994
- Running time: 109 minutes
- Country: United States
- Language: English
- Box office: $21 million

Iron Will is a 1994 American adventure film. It is based on the true story of the 1917 dog-sled race from Winnipeg, Manitoba to Saint Paul, Minnesota, a 522 mi (840 km)-long stretch and part of the "Red River-St. Paul Sports Carnival Derby." The protagonist of the film, Will Stoneman, depicts the story of the 26-year-old American racer, Fred Hartman, although a few elements of the character resemble the 22-year-old Albert Campbell, the Métis man who won the race and whose father had died shortly prior. The film is directed by Charles Haid, and stars Mackenzie Astin, Kevin Spacey, David Ogden Stiers, George Gerdes, Brian Cox, John Terry, Penelope Windust and August Schellenberg.

In the film, a teenager is thrust into adulthood when desperate family circumstances compel him to enter a lucrative yet dangerous cross-country dog race. Despite numerous odds against him, including harsh weather, hostile competitors, and uncooperative dogs, he strives to continue forward; getting help from unlikely sources along the way, he is shocked to learn that not only he, but the whole country, is inspired and hopeful to see his own "iron will" come to fruition at the finish line.

== Plot ==
In 1917, 17-year-old Will Stoneman (Mackenzie Astin) is a mail-runner for his small South Dakota town and an apprentice carpenter for his father Jack (John Terry), who creates furniture and runs the family farm. After delivering the town mail one day, Will opens a college letter and sees that he was accepted to his desired school. Despite his happiness at being accepted, he hesitates to leave his family responsibilities behind and worries about how the family will pay for it; Jack, however, encourages Will to chase his dreams.

While returning with Will from a lumber run with their sled dogs, Jack drowns in a mushing accident when his sled overturns into a river. As the only son, now responsible for his mother Maggie (Penelope Windust) and his family's bill-indebted farm, Will despairs college but protests when his mother plans to sell their valuable sled dogs. Knowing that his father was thinking of competing in an international dog-sled race with a cash prize (to cover Will's college tuition), Will insists on attempting.

After a month of rigorous training from Native American farm hand Ned Dodd (August Schellenberg), Will travels to Winnipeg, Manitoba, Canada, to enter the race. The principal sponsor, railroad magnate J.W. Harper (David Ogden Stiers), refuses his entry as too late. American news reporter Harry Kingsley (Kevin Spacey) sees the youngster as his opportunity to win headlines and gives Will the money to pay the late fee.

During the race, Will's energy and determination win the grudging respect of the international mushers, as well as Harper, who starts a wager between himself and one of the race's co-sponsors, Angus McTeague (Brian Cox) over whether Will will finish the race. Kingsley, meanwhile, writes admiring articles gushing about Will's courage and competitive zeal (nicknaming him "Iron Will"), but his stories initially languish on back pages while the world focuses on the European War. Will becomes increasingly tired and sick, especially after he sacrifices his lead to save an Icelandic competitor who was felled by influenza.

McTeague, even more skeptical of Will's chances than Harper, offers a bribe to brutal Swedish competitor Borg Guillarson (George Gerdes) to do whatever it takes to force the kid out of the race. Will stands up against this attempted sabotage, though he earns a new enemy in Borg. Will also realizes that Kingsley is using him as a pawn to justify embellished articles which the veteran reporter hopes will win him front-page status and a promotion from the cold North to his paper's headquarters. Will ends up punching Kingsley in the face when the two meet during a stopover due to what the articles might do to his worried mother. That act actually earns Will the reporter's real respect. When McTeague repeatedly tries to bribe Will to drop out of the race, Kingsley defends Will's honor and throws McTeague out.

Meanwhile, Kingsley's stories, as well as other reporters writing about Will, finally start capturing the attention of the nation. When another reporter arrives in Will's hometown and discovers the real reason for Will's participation in the race, he not only reports the story, but he arranges for Maggie, Ned, and some of Will's friends to travel up to Canada to surprise Will at the finish line. Harper, who admits that he sees something of himself and his own youthful days in Will, suggests to McTeague that whoever wins the wager should send some of the winnings to help Will's family, though McTeague is still unimpressed by the young man. Will's determination also has an impact on Kinglsey, who tells a colleague that Will has inspired the reporter to remember why he got into journalism.

On the last day of the race, Kingsley becomes concerned when he sees how serious Will's physical condition is. Kingsley urges him to drop out of the race and see a doctor, but Will insists on finishing the race. He finds himself following Borg on a dangerous shortcut to the finish line. This hazardous frosty course alongside runs a turbulent river, just like the trail that took the life of Will's father. Will remembers Ned's advice and finds the courage to trust his dog team and risk the water hazards. Borg takes the lead by continually whipping his dogs, but they quit from exhaustion and attack him when he attempts to brutalize them into continuing. Will sees Borg being savaged by his team and scares them off of Borg as he races by on the dangerous shortcut.

Will's sled overturns near the finish line and he collapses, exhausted. Then Ned awakens the spirit of his father's dog Gus with a familiar whistle with the crowd following suit. While the other racers close in, Will struggles to stand up and cross the finish line just ahead of the others. Falling to the ground, unable to stand, he is helped up by his fellow competitors and falls into his mother's arms. Both Kingsley and Harper applaud with pride at Will's triumph, as does even McTeague. The film ends with spectators surrounding Will, shouting out "Iron Will" applauding his and the dogs' heroic victory.

== Cast ==
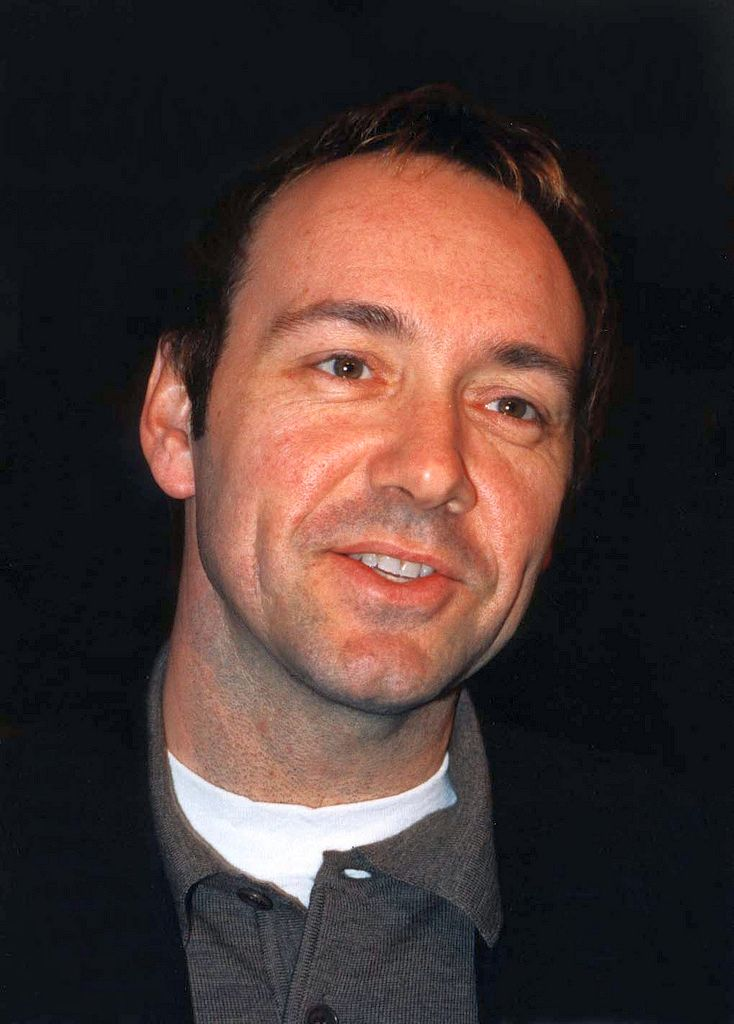
Iron Will was Kevin Spacey's ninth theatrical film

- Mackenzie Astin as Will Stoneman
- Kevin Spacey as Harry Kingsley
- David Ogden Stiers as J.W. Harper
- August Schellenberg as Ned Dodd
- Brian Cox as Angus McTeague
- George Gerdes as Borg Guillarson
- John Terry as Jack Stoneman
- Penelope Windust as Maggie Stoneman
- Jeffrey Alan Chandler as DeFontaine
- Michael Laskin as Simon Lambert
- Rex Linn as Joe McPherson
- Richard Riehle as Burton
- Beau as Gus

== Production ==
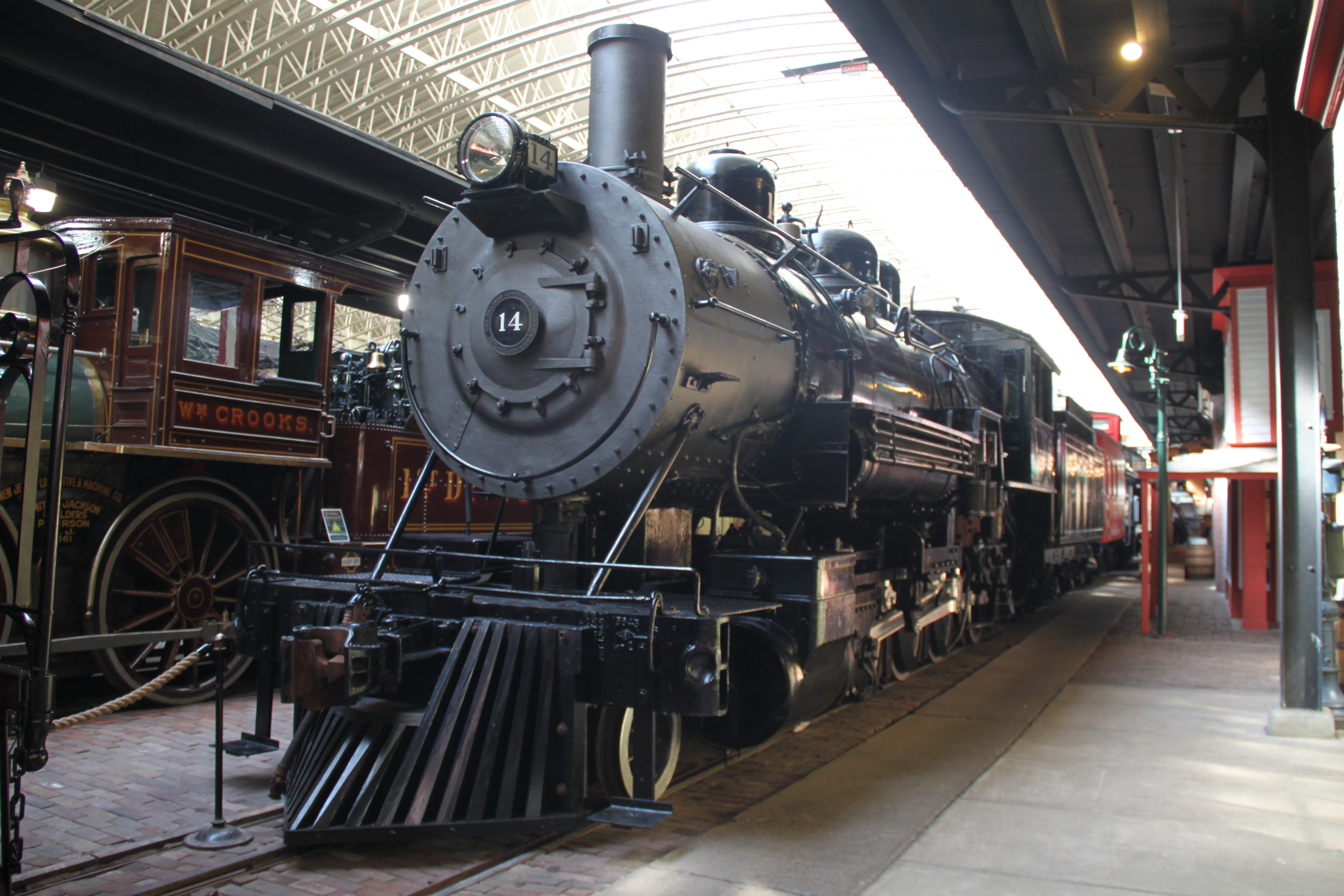
No. 14, the locomotive used for the film, being displayed inside the Lake Superior Railroad Museum

Much of the film was shot on location in Minnesota, mostly along the Lake Superior shoreline as well as the towns of Cloquet, Floodwood, and Meadowlands. Although the race takes place between Winnipeg and Saint Paul, neither city appears in the film. The Winnipeg starting point for the race was filmed in Duluth, Minnesota near the Historic Old Central High School. The Lake Superior Railroad Museum, also located in Duluth, provided their active steam locomotive of that time Duluth and Northern Minnesota 14.

The "Como Park" in St. Paul finish line scenes were filmed at the train depot in Two Harbors, Minnesota. The fictional town of Birch Ridge, South Dakota was filmed at the Munger Boat Landing in Duluth's Smithville neighborhood. The dramatic bridge scene was actually filmed on two different bridges, the Oliver Bridge in Duluth and another railroad bridge along the North Shore of Lake Superior. Due to the general lack of mountains in Minnesota (excepting the Sawtooth Mountains), scenes in which Will goes through mountainous terrain were filmed in Montana. Additional footage was shot in Superior, Wisconsin as well as Brookston, Minnesota.

== Box office ==
In its opening weekend, Iron Will took in $5,313,406. The film made a total domestic gross of $21,006,361.

== Reception ==
On Rotten Tomatoes, the film has an approval rating of 67%, based on 15 reviews, with an average rating of 6.2/10. On Metacritic, the film has a score of 58 out of 100, based on 20 critics, indicating "mixed or average" reviews. Audiences polled by CinemaScore gave the film a rare "A+" grade.

Roger Ebert of the Chicago Sun-Times gave it 2 out of 4 and wrote: "Iron Will is an Identikit plot, put together out of standard pieces. Even the scenery looks generic; there's none of the majesty of Disney's genuinely inspired dog movie, White Fang."

== Historical accuracy ==
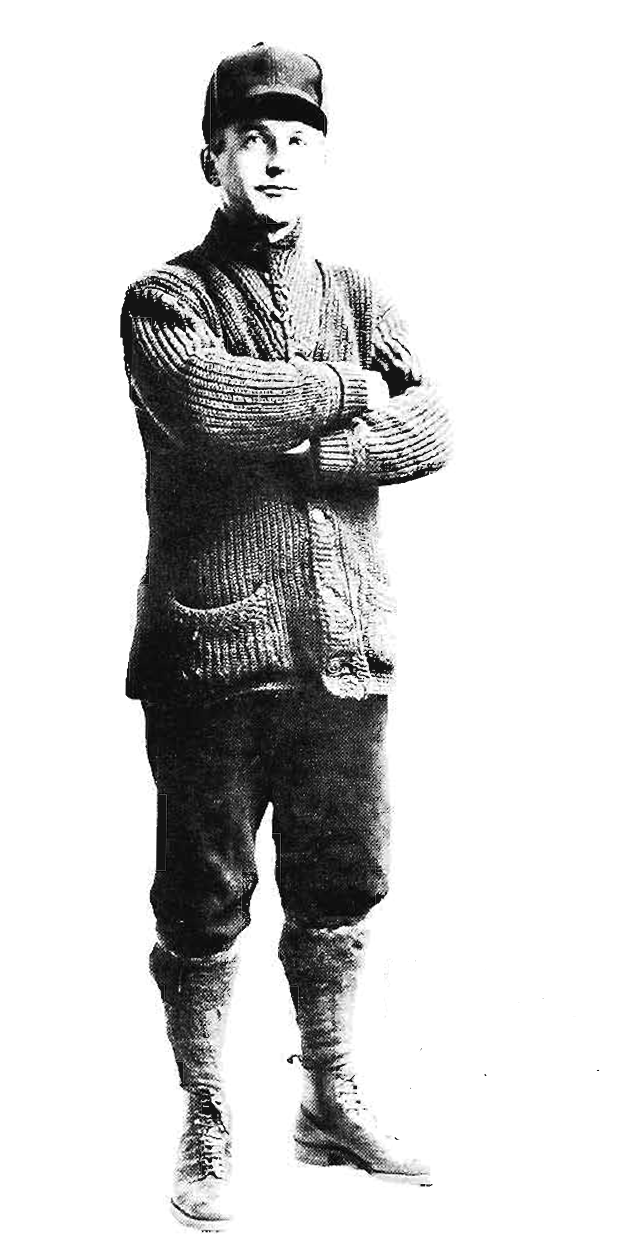
Fred Hartman, who became an American hero for his participation in the 1917 dog sled race.

The winner of the 1917 Red River-St. Paul Sports Carnival Derby was not the American Fred Hartman, but Albert Campbell, a Métis man, who sledded with his brother. In the film, two Native American brothers are portrayed as coming in second and third places. Despite losing the race, Fred Hartman became a national hero promoted by the newspapers. As in the movie, Hartman was one of two Americans racing, but was considered an outsider, dubbed "the Yankee," and underwent similar difficulties portrayed in the film, such as discord among his dog team and the loss of his lead dog. Hartman was hailed for his courage and tenacity, and although he lagged in pace, he repeatedly passed his competitors by sledding at night, sneaking out of towns ahead of his competition, and running instead of riding the sled. He was given an American flag by a "pretty school teacher" at Grafton, North Dakota, as reported in a contemporary news article.

Similar to the film, Fred Hartman narrowly escaped collision with a passenger train with the assistance of two local men who helped him and his dogs off the track. He was more fatigued toward the end of the race than the other participants, at one point needing to be assisted by local citizens to walk into a hotel to rest, and he was encouraged by his competitors to drop out. Unlike in the film, where Will Stoneman narrowly wins, Fred Hartman came in last place among the five finishers. He collapsed over the finish line snow blind, in "semi-conscious condition," having lost 32 pounds body weight since the start of the race but was still hailed a hero for his determination.

== See also ==
- Survival film
- White Fang, 1991 film
