= Benjamin Salisbury =

American actor and dancer

- Born: Benjamin David Salisbury; October 19, 1980 (age 46); Minneapolis, Minnesota, U.S.
- Occupations: Actor, dancer, executive
- Years active: 1992–2006
- Spouse: Kelly Murkey (m. 2006; div. 2013)
- Children: 3

Benjamin David Salisbury (born October 19, 1980) is an American former actor, dancer and executive best known for playing the role of Brighton Sheffield on the CBS television sitcom The Nanny from 1993 to 1999.

== Early life and education ==
Born in Minneapolis, Minnesota, on October 19, 1980, to parents David Arthur Salisbury and Mindy Jo (née Schneidewind) Salisbury.

In 1998, he graduated from Wayzata High School in Plymouth, Minnesota, and enrolled in American University in Washington, D.C., that fall.

He has two older sisters and a younger brother.

Salisbury said he first got into acting when he was in a play at 9 years old.

In 2000, he was an intern for House minority leader Richard Gephardt.

== Career ==
An accomplished dancer, Salisbury would often treat The Nanny studio audiences to improvisational routines when the cameras were not rolling. Most of Salisbury's career was on The Nanny from 1993 to 1999. In 1996, he won best actor in a comedy series at the Young Artist Awards.

Salisbury played Martin Short's son in the 1992 film Captain Ron, and appeared in D3: The Mighty Ducks (1996) as the sports announcer. Salisbury voiced the role of Tin Boy on The Oz Kids in 1996, and appeared in the 2004 reunion of the sitcom The Nanny titled The Nanny Reunion: A Nosh to Remember with Fran Drescher, Renée Taylor, Rachel Chagall and others from The Nanny cast. In 2005, he had a minor role as a train expert on the episode "Sabotage" of the series Numb3rs. In August 2006, Salisbury was featured in Domino's Pizza commercials featuring Fudge-ums, Domino's then-new mini-brownies.

In 2000, he worked as the events coordinator for Slapshot the Eagle, the Washington Capitals team mascot. As of 2022, Salisbury is working at Universal Studios Hollywood as the director of operations for the park.

== Personal life ==
Salisbury married his wife Kelly Murkey in 2006. He has three children.

Salisbury was a contestant on Jeopardy!, where he competed in an episode of Teen Celebrity Jeopardy! against Kirsten Dunst and Joseph Gordon-Levitt. Salisbury won with $1, making him one of only three contestants to win with just $1. Despite winning with $1, he still received $15,000 for his charity.

== Filmography ==
=== Film ===
Year	Title	Role	Notes
1992	Captain Ron	Benjamin Harvey	
1993	Shimmer	Young Spacy	
1994	Iron Will	Scout #1	
1996	Virtual Oz	Tin Boy	Voice
1996	The Nome Prince and the Magic Belt	Tin Boy	Voice
1996	D3: The Mighty Ducks	Josh	
1996	Who Stole Santa?	Tin Boy	Voice
1996	Guide to the World of Family Computers, Software & Games	Ben	
1996	Christmas in Oz	Tin Boy	Voice
2002	Simone	Production Assistant	
2003	Red Zone	Derek	

=== Television ===
Year	Title	Role	Notes
1993–1999	The Nanny	Brighton Sheffield	145 episodes
1996	Kirk	Preston Beckman IV	Episode: "The Beach House"
1996	The Oz Kids	Tin Boy	Television short
1996	Promised Land	Trevor Riley	Episode: "The Prodigy"
2005	Numbers	Doctor	Episode: "Sabotage"
