= David L. Boushey =

American stuntman (born 1942)

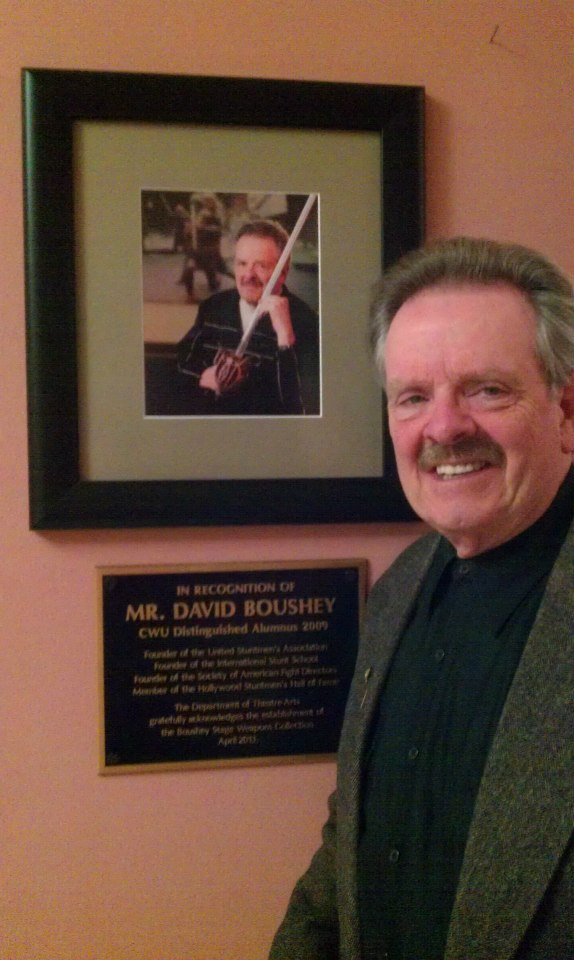
Dave with plaque at CWU

David L. Boushey (born 1942), is an American stuntman, stunt coordinator, stage fight director and stunt trainer. He is the founder of the United Stuntmen's Association, the International Stunt School, the Society of American Fight Directors, and is a member of The Hollywood Stuntmen's Hall of Fame.

== Early years ==
Boushey was born in 1942 in the city of Everett, Washington where he spent his first 15 years. At age 16 he moved with his family to Seattle where he graduated in the first graduating class from Ingraham High School in 1961. Boushey graduated from Central Washington University in 1969. After two years as an account executive with the Seattle Post Intelligencer he decided to fulfil his dream of becoming an actor. Boushey went to England where he trained at the prestigious East 15 Acting School founded by the legendary Joan Littlewood (A Taste of Honey, and Oh What a Lovely War). It was at EAST 15 where he met fight master Ian McKay who introduced him to the art of stage combat. After two and a half years working with the likes of William Hobbs (The Three/Four Musketeers...1974) he returned home to Seattle where he founded the Society of American Fight Directors in 1977. In 1985 he founded the United Stuntmen's Association and in 1991 he founded the International Stunt School.

== Career ==
Boushey's professional career spans forty years with over 400 theatre credits and 45 films. Boushey's film credits include Blue Velvet, Twin Peaks, The Hand That Rocks The Cradle, Drugstore Cowboy, Mad Love, and Northern Exposure. Moreover, he has trained well over 2000 students and taught master classes in over 100 universities and colleges throughout North America.

Boushey has worked with eight Academy Award-winning actors including Denzel Washington, William Hurt, Tommy Lee Jones, and Chris Cooper.

Boushey's first professional production was at the Seattle Repertory Theatre in 1974 under Duncan Ross. The production was Hamlet starring Christopher Walken (Academy Award winner for the Deer Hunter). Boushey soon joined the prestigious theatre complex, the Oregon Shakespeare Festival where he was both actor and fight director for two seasons. Boushey returned to Seattle to play Valvert in the production of Cyrano de Bergerac as well as choreograph the fight scene. Boushey's career from this point took him all over North America where he worked with George Abbott, Jon Jory, Milton Katsales, Daniel Sullivan, Duncan Ross and Meg Booker amongst others. Theatres he choreographed action for include: Actors Theatre Louisville, San Diego Globe, Seattle Repertory Theatre, Intiman Theatre, San Francisco ACT, Utah Shakespeare Festival, Oregon Shakespeare Festival, Empty Space Theatre, Folger Theatre, Pioneer Theatre, Mark Taper Forum, Cincinnati Playhouse, Illinois Shakespeare Festival, Dallas Theatre Center and Seattle ACT. He choreographed the action in nearly all of the LORT theatres in North America as well as several ballet and opera companies.

In 1981, Boushey moved into film where he eventually became a stunt coordinator and stunt performer. He was a stunt double for Tom Skerrit, Harvey Keitel, Rutger Hauer, Timothy Busfield and Meg Ryan. He was stunt coordinator for the television series Northern Exposure, Under Suspicion, Under One Roof (starring James Earl Jones) and Medicine Ball. Some of the actors he worked with and coordinated are Drew Barrymore, Elijah Wood, Denzel Washington, Kyle MacLachlan, Brad Dourif, Dennis Hopper, Matt Dillon, Kiefer Sutherland, Annette Bening, William Hurt, Chris Cooper, Linda Evans, River Phoenix, Tommy Lee Jones, Jobeth Williams, Danny Glover, Mary Tyler Moore, Brendan Fraser and Heather Graham to name a few.

As of 2015, Boushey still works in the film industry as a stunt coordinator as well as co-administrating the International Stunt School.

- In 2013, Boushey coordinated stunts and second unit direction for the drama thriller Brush with Danger, directed by Livi Zheng.
- In 2015, Boushey coordinated stunts and second unit direction for the drama thriller Insight, directed by Livi Zheng.

== Honors ==
- Inducted into the Hollywood Stuntmen's Hall of Fame (1992).
- Los Angeles Critics Circle Award (Romeo & Juliet...dir, Milton Katsales 1985).
- Drama-Logue Award for Best Fight Choreography (Los Angeles, 1985).
- The Weekly Award for Best Fight Choreography (Los Angeles, 1981).
- Fight Master Emeritus, Society of American Fight Directors.
- Honorary Fight Master, Fight Directors Canada.
- Distinguished Alumni Award 2009 (Central Washington University).
- Producer of acclaimed educational series "Combat for the Stage and Screen".
- Author of the book Lessons from the Maestro published in June 2021 by Routledge Publishing Company.
