= Roxy Shih =

American director

- Born: Rotterdam, Netherlands
- Occupation(s): Director, Writer, Producer
- Years active: 2010–present

Roxy Shih (Chinese: 施惠馨) is a Taiwanese American director and producer. She is best known for her work on the films The Tribe and Painkillers.

== Career ==
Roxy directed the short film Play Time as a Visual Communications "Armed with a Camera" fellowship film, which premiered at the Directors Guild of America. In 2016, her directorial debut film The Tribe, starring Jessica Rothe, Anne Winters and Michael Nardelli. The film won the Best Debut Feature Film at the Female Eye Film Festival and Best Feature Director at Other Worlds Austin Film Festival.

Roxy's second feature film Painkillers, starting Madeline Zima, Grant Bowler, Debra Wilson and Adam Huss, premiered at the Brussels International Fantastic Film Festival. She is also the founder and festival director of the Taiwanese American Film Festival. She also directed the recent sci-fi anthology series Dark/Web, premiered at Comic-Con.

== Filmography ==
Year	Film	Director	Writer	Note
2011	Play Time	Yes	Yes	Short film
2011	Table for Two	Yes	Yes	Short film
2013	The Siren	Yes	Yes	Short film
2014	Embers	Yes	Yes	Short film
2014	Ambrosia	Yes	Yes	Short film
2016	The Tribe	Yes	No	Feature Film
2016	Im/perfect	Yes	No	Short film
2017	Get Jacked	Yes	Yes	TV series
2018	Painkillers	Yes	No	Feature Film
2018	The Visit	Yes	Yes	Short film
2019	Dark/Web	Yes	Yes	TV series
2021	Mira Mira	Yes	No	TV series
2021	List of a Lifetime	Yes	No	Feature Film
2023	Mira Mira	Yes	No	Feature Film

As Producer

- 2010 - The Warp Zone
- 2011 - Drone
- 2011 - Play Time
- 2011 - Table for Two
- 2013 - Deadly Revisions
- 2013 - Novel
- 2013 - Woodland Heights
- 2013 - Another New Wrinkle
- 2014 - Sew Clevver
- 2014 - Lilies
- 2014 - Seahorses
- 2014 - Private Tutor
- 2014 - Embers
- 2014 - Ambrosia
- 2015 - Close Up
- 2015 - Pipe Dream
- 2015 - 11:11
- 2015 - The Sound of Magic
- 2016 - The Tribe
- 2016 - Silent Night
- 2016 - The Bridge
- 2016 - Im/perfect
- 2017 - Your Own Road
- 2017 - Get Jacked
- 2017 - Mad Genius
- 2017 - Peggie
- 2017 - Garden Party Massacre
- 2017 - Willie and Me
- 2017 - The Plural of Blood
- 2018 - Evoke
- 2019 - End of Summer
