= Ken Zheng =

Indonesian actor, screenwriter and martial artist (born 1995)

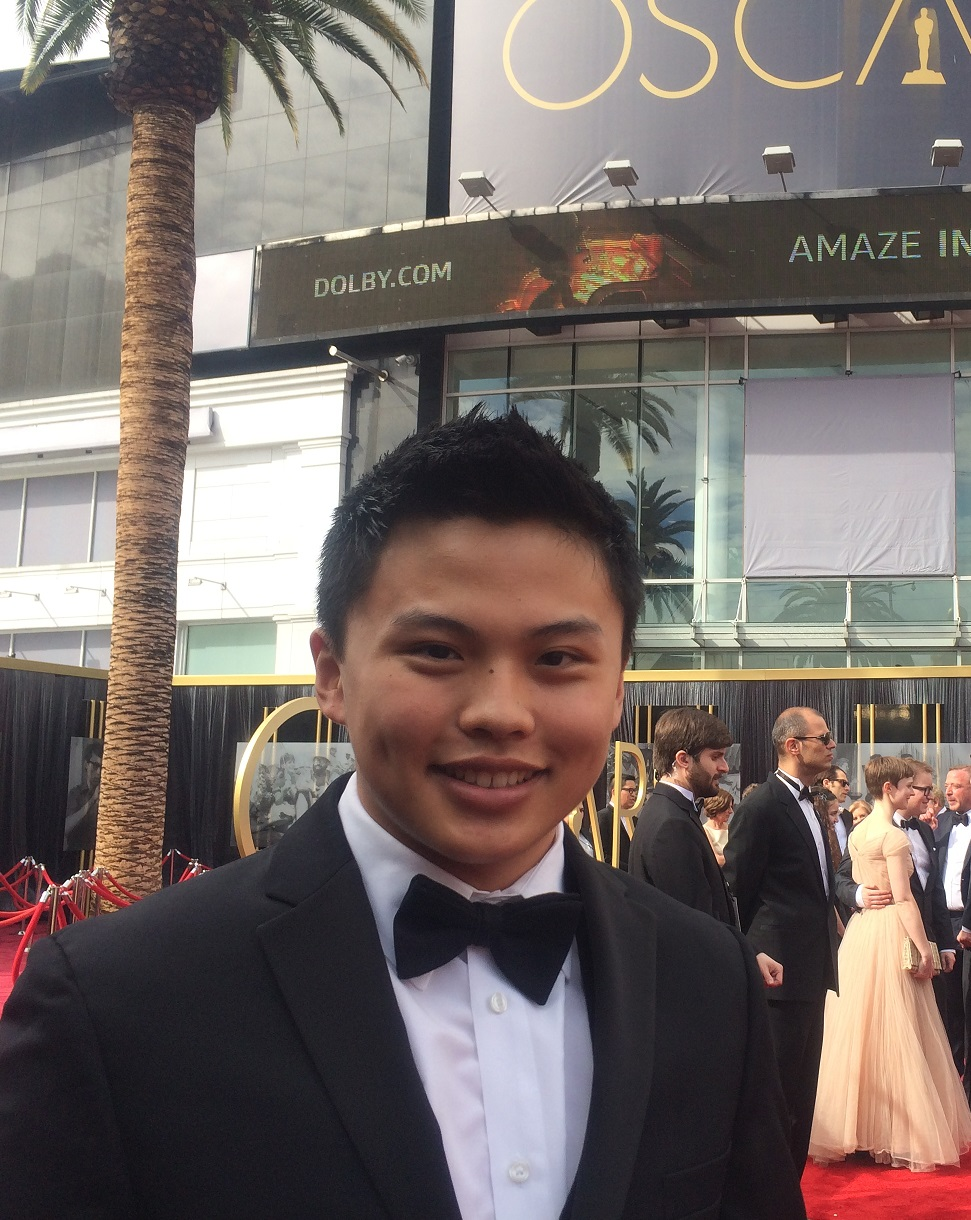
- Born: 5 April 1995 (age 31); Jakarta, Indonesia
- Occupations: Actor; Screenwriter; Martial artist
- Years active: 2011–present
- Website: http://kenzheng.com/

Ken Zheng (born 5 April 1995) is an Indonesian actor, screenwriter and martial artist. He began his career as a martial artist at a young age, and has since starred in Brush with Danger (2014) and the action thriller Insight (2021) which was directed by his sister Livi Zheng.

== Early life ==
Ken Zheng was born in Jakarta on 5 April 1995. At 10 years old, he moved to Beijing, China with his older sister Livi Zheng.

== Martial arts and stunt work ==
Zheng began training in martial arts at an early age, joined the Indonesian National Kick-boxing team in 2010, and when Zheng turned 16, he became the youngest kickboxing champion in Indonesia's history. Zheng would go to win the championship once more, and also placed 5th in the 2012 World Kick Boxing Championship in Macau.

== Education ==
While attending the Western Academy of Beijing, Zheng began creating his own films and documentaries, co-founding and building an educational outreach service group for poorly funded rural Chinese schools, and shooting and assembling the school's special event coverage for the academy's Film department. At the academy, Zheng also began making documentaries focusing on another one of his passions: Education for children of poor and migrant workers. He wrote and directed a documentary about the Book-a-Book Foundation, a group he co-founded composed of high school students who raised money to create a mobile library service for under-developed migrant schools around Beijing. Zheng also shot a documentary about Children's Hope Foundation, which serves Beijing's most impoverished schools, and the Hearts 4 Arts Foundation about high school students who provides arts education to migrant students.

Zheng graduated with a bachelor's degree in radio, TV and Film Production at the University of Texas-Austin.

== Filmography ==
=== Film ===
Year	Title	Role	Notes
2021	Insight	Jian	Writer, Actor
2014	Brush with Danger	Qiang Ken	Writer, actor

=== Television ===
Year	Title	Role	Featured episodes	Notes
2013	A Day with a Star	Self	1	Interview

=== Brush with Danger ===
Zheng wrote, starred in and did stunt work for Brush with Danger, which was shot in Seattle and Los Angeles. The film tells a story about a painter and a fighter, both artists in their own way, who are also brother and sister, forced to flee their home. They arrive in Seattle, the Emerald City, inside a shipping container. Trying to make their way in a strange new world, the pair struggles to survive. Until one day an art dealer takes an interest in the sister's painting, and the pair find themselves living a dream come true. The sister loses herself in her painting, and the brother seizes the opportunity to express himself as a fighter.

Tricked by her patron into forging a long-lost Van Gogh, purchased by a criminal with a passion for fine art, the sister and her brother soon find themselves in Seattle's criminal underworld and an encounter with danger.

Brush With Danger was released theatrically in the United States starting 19 September 2014. Following the release in the United States, Brush With Danger was distributed internationally.

=== Insight ===
Recently, Livi Zheng reassembled her filmmaking team from Brush with Danger to shoot the Los Angeles-set action thriller, starring Ken Zheng, Tony Todd, John Savage, Keith David, Madeline Zima and Sean Patrick Flanery.
