= Mark Borkowski =

British PR agent

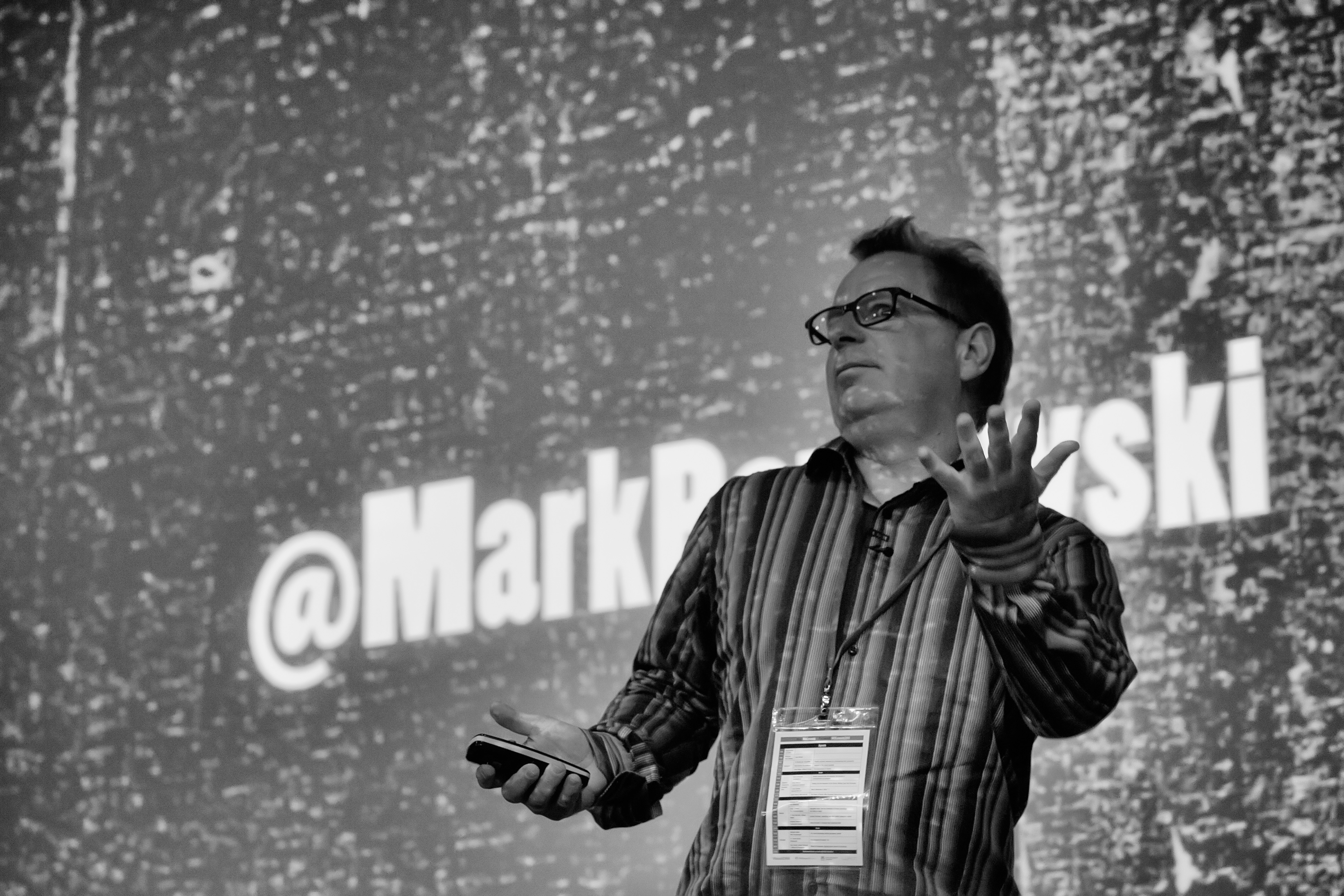
- Born: 1958 (age 67–68); Stroud, Gloucestershire
- Citizenship: British
- Occupations: Public relations, lecturer, author
- Known for: Publicity stunts
- Website: https://borkowski.co.uk/

Mark Borkowski (born 1958/1959 in Stroud, Gloucestershire) is a British public relations (PR) consultant and writer.

Borkowski has written about public relations and media culture for The Guardian.

== Early life and education ==
Borkowski attended King’s Stanley Junior School and St Peter’s High School in Gloucester. He began working in public relations at the age of nineteen and has cited the influence of Sex Pistols manager Malcolm McLaren on his interest in public relations and publicity.

His first professional role was as in-house publicist at the Wyvern Theatre in Swindon. In 1981, he moved to the Theatre Royal Stratford East, where he worked with Philip Hedley. He later undertook publicity work in London’s West End, including a revival of The Pirates of Penzance.

== Career ==
=== Public relations ===
Borkowski began his career as a publicist for the Wyvern Theatre in Swindon and later worked at the Theatre Royal Stratford East in 1981. He founded Borkowski PR in 1987. The agency initially focused on theatre and entertainment publicity before expanding into corporate and brand communications.

Clients listed in coverage of the agency's work have included Cirque Du Soleil, Harrods, American Express, Oxfam, Amnesty International, Selfridges, Vodafone, Virgin Mobile, Hasbro and Cadbury. Press coverage has also cited work involving figures such as Mikhail Gorbachev, Ian Botham, Jimmy Page, Cameron Mackintosh, Dale Vince, Noel Edmonds, Van Morrison, Michael Flatley, Cliff Richard and Tony Kaye.

In 2007, the agency handled publicity for the relaunch of Cadbury’s Wispa chocolate bar, which won PRWeek’s Campaign of the Year award.

=== Crisis and reputation management ===
Borkowski has advised public figures on media strategy during legal proceedings and periods of public controversy. He has written and commented in national media on media coverage of controversies involving public figures, including the Duchess of Sussex and Phillip Schofield.

The Financial Times reported in 2025 on his involvement in PREEMPT, described as a reputation insurance initiative addressing culture-war related reputational risks.

=== Celebrity and theatre work ===
Borkowski has worked with Noel Edmonds advising on media strategy for his 2009 wedding, when photo rights were withheld from celebrity magazines. For Cliff Richard, he managed publicity campaigns including the campaign for The Millennium Prayer to the UK singles chart.

He also worked on publicity for shows including Stomp, Mamma Mia!, and Terry Gilliam's Into the Woods.

When Borkowski left his eponymous agency, he retained the five staff of the arts and entertainment division and its clients, which included Mamma Mia!, and Womad.

Borkowski maintains a blog, Mark My Words. He has provided commentary on public figures including Sydney Sweeney, Drake, and David Beckham.

== Notable campaigns and publicity stunts ==
In 1994, Borkowski handled publicity for the London production of Bad Boy Johnny and the Prophets of Doom, which attracted press attention and criticism from religious groups.

In 1996, he acted as public relations adviser on the launch of Carlsberg-Tetley’s alcopop brand Thickhead. Contemporary trade coverage described the campaign as controversial amid wider debate about alcopops and their potential appeal to underage drinkers; the product was subsequently withdrawn.

Publicity for the French contemporary circus Archaos in the early 1990s generated tabloid coverage in the United Kingdom focusing on its provocative performance style.

Press reports have also associated him with publicity stunts and promotional events.

== Media and commentary ==
Borkowski has written opinion pieces for The Guardian on celebrity culture and reputation management. In interviews and commentary, he has described celebrity as “a Faustian bargain” and commented that social media has intensified scrutiny of public figures.

In 2025, he produced the BBC Radio 4 documentary Outrage Inc., examining the history of political stunts.

== Books and publications ==
Borkowski has written two histories of public relations, focusing in particular on the art of the publicity stunt.

- Borkowski, Mark (2001). Improperganda: The Art of the Publicity Stunt. London: Vision On. ISBN 978-1-903399-00-2.
- Borkowski, Mark (2008). The Fame Formula: How Hollywood’s Fixers, Fakers and Star Makers Shaped the Publicity Industry. London: Sidgwick & Jackson Limited. ISBN 978-0-283-07039-6.

A 2009 article in The Times questioned the historical existence of one of the book's figures, Maynard Nottage, a claim Borkowski disputed.

== Reception and awards ==
Borkowski has been the subject of profile coverage in PRWeek. In a 2011 article, The Irish Times reported that the broadcaster Jeremy Paxman had described him as "the proud inheritor of the Barnum tradition of publicity."

He has received awards including:

- Outstanding Achievement, Fringe Report (2006), for creating “a new branch of theatre – theatre of publicity.”
- Campaign of the Year, PRWeek Gold Award, for Cadbury Wispa relaunch (2008).
- Listed as Top Flight Reputation Manager in Spear’s 500.
