= Jamie Kaler =

American stand-up comedian and actor (born 1964)

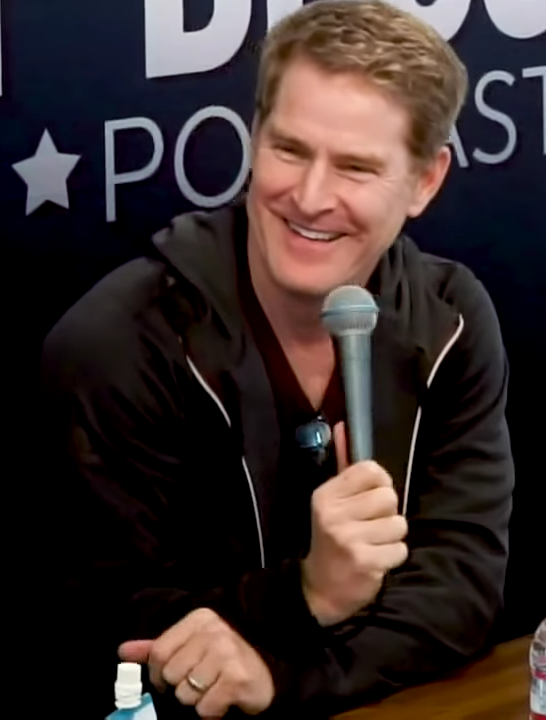
- Kaler in 2019
- Born: September 14, 1964 (age 61); Hooksett, New Hampshire
- Occupations: Actor; comedian

Jamie Kaler (born September 14, 1964) is an American stand-up comedian and actor who has gained fame by portraying the character Mike Callahan on the TBS comedy My Boys.

== Career ==
Kaler hosted America: Facts vs. Fiction on American Heroes Channel. He has appeared on such talk shows as the Late Late Show as well as having a role on the sitcom How I Met Your Mother, and had a recurring role on Will and Grace. Kaler has also done voice work for Robot Chicken. He is a member of the ACME Company, ACME Comedy Theatre's top-level sketch company and has also made guest appearances on Friends, The King of Queens, Shake It Up and Monk.

== Personal life ==
Kaler graduated from Boston University, and was afterwards commissioned as a lieutenant in the United States Navy and stationed in San Diego. After resigning his commission, he started performing in comedy clubs and eventually became involved in the Los Angeles comedy scene.

== Filmography ==
Year	Title	Role	Notes
1994	Saved by the Bell: The New Class	Stanton	Episode: "Drinking 101"
1997	Friends	Mike	Episode: "The One with the Girl from Poughkeepsie"
2001	3rd Rock from the Sun	Deliveryman	Episode: "Mary Loves Scoochie" Pt. 1
2002	Will & Grace	Gary	Recurring role
2004	Arrested Development	Firefighter	Episode: "Amigo"
2004	Significant Others	Seth	3 episodes
2005	That '70s Show	Stew Bailey	Episode: "On With the Show"
2005	Robot Chicken	Bloopers Host, Various voices	Recurring role
2006	Monk	Peter Breen	Episode: "Mr. Monk Can't See a Thing"
2006	The New Adventures of Old Christine	Hugh	Episode: "Crash"
2006–2010	My Boys	Mike Callahan	Main role
2007	D-War	Helicopter Pilot	Film
2009	How I Met Your Mother	Jim	Episode: "The Window"
2011	Shake It Up	Coach Lesseur	2 episodes
2013	Austin & Ally	Dennis Wade	Episode: "Families & Feuds"
2013–present	America: Facts vs. Fiction	Host	Recurring
2017	The Loud House	Sports Announcer (voice)	2 episodes
2017	The Middle	Hudson	Episode: "The Par-Tay"
2017–2019	I'm Sorry	Gavin	4 episodes
2018	NCIS	Chris Bell	Episode: "Family Ties"
2018	Knight Squad	Arc's Dad	2 episodes
2018	Heathers	Big Bud Dean	Recurring role
2019–2020	Tacoma FD	Captain Polonsky	3 episodes
2021	List of a Lifetime	Marty Carroll	TV movie
2024	The Thundermans Return	Police Officer	TV movie
