= 'Til There Was You =

- Theatrical release poster
- Directed by: Scott Winant
- Written by: Winnie Holzman
- Produced by: Penney Finkelman Cox; Tom Rosenberg; Alan Poul
- Starring: Jeanne Tripplehorn; Dylan McDermott; Sarah Jessica Parker
- Cinematography: Bobby Bukowski
- Edited by: Richard Marks; Joanna Cappuccilli
- Music by: Miles Goodman; Terence Blanchard
- Production company: Lakeshore Entertainment
- Distributed by: Paramount Pictures (North America, United Kingdom, Ireland and France); Summit Entertainment (International)
- Release date: May 30, 1997
- Running time: 114 minutes
- Country: United States
- Language: English
- Budget: $23 million
- Box office: $3.5 million

'Til There Was You is a 1997 American romantic comedy film directed by Scott Winant and starring Jeanne Tripplehorn, Dylan McDermott, and Sarah Jessica Parker. The screenplay, written by Winnie Holzman, traces thirty-odd years in the parallel lives of two people whose intertwined paths finally converge when their mutual interest in a community project brings them together.

The film was released on May 30, 1997, and failed both critically and commercially.

== Plot ==
Gwen Moss has spent the better part of her life waiting for the man of her dreams, unaware she briefly bumped into him at school as children and has had several close encounters ever since. She aspires to have a life like her longtime friend Debbie, a successful doctor with a beautiful home but a marriage that may not be as perfect as it seems on the surface.

Gwen is hired to ghostwrite the autobiography of former child star Francesca Lanfield, whose career virtually ended following her stint on a long-running Partridge Family-Brady Bunch hybrid sitcom. Francesca owns La Fortuna, a picturesque vintage apartment complex. Architect Nick Dawkan's boss Timo wants to buy and demolish the complex so his firm can construct a modern condominium development in its place. Francesca agrees to the sale as long as Nick is in charge of the project, and the two embark on a somewhat tempestuous relationship. Both are damaged emotionally; Francesca has overcome an addiction to drugs but still craves the spotlight, while Nick is dealing with the memory of a father who failed as a songwriter and became a hopeless alcoholic. Meanwhile, Gwen is shocked to discover her father Saul never loved her mother, Beebee, and is devastated when the two decide to divorce. Her parents' story of how they met in her childhood turns out to be false: Saul got stood up by his date that night and Beebee thought he was interested in her. They only married to "avoid an argument", as Saul puts it.

Gwen moves into La Fortuna and finds herself surrounded by an assortment of odd but lovable neighbors who have created a family of their own. When the tenants are presented with eviction notices, they decide to fight back. Having discovered the property was designed by Sophia Monroe, one of the first female architects of note (and coincidentally Nick's mentor during the early stages of his career), and served as home to silent film star Louise Brooks, Gwen hopes she can have it declared an historical landmark with the assistance of Jon Haas, the city councilman she is dating. Nick is prepared to fight for his firm until he sees La Fortuna and learns its history and decides it might be worth preserving after all. Though ultimately unsuccessful in preserving La Fortuna, they finally meet at the Nicotine Anonymous meeting, are then happily married, and have a daughter together.

== Cast ==
- Jeanne Tripplehorn as Gwen Moss
  - Madeline Zima as Gwen Moss (age 12)
  - Yvonne Zima as Gwen Moss (age 7)
- Dylan McDermott as Nick Dawkan
  - Joshua Rubin as Nick Dawkan (age 12)
  - Kellen Fink as Nick Dawkan (age 7)
- Sarah Jessica Parker as Francesca Lanfield
- Jennifer Aniston as Debbie
  - Amanda Fuller as Debbie (age 13)
- Craig Bierko as Jon Haas
- Nina Foch as Sophia Monroe
- Alice Drummond as Harriet
- Christine Ebersole as Beebee Moss
  - Janel Moloney as Beebee Moss (age 25)
- Michael Tucker as Saul Moss
  - John Plumpis as Saul Moss (age 25)
- Reg Rogers as Bob
- Kasi Lemmons as Angenelle
- Patrick Malahide as Timo
- Steve Antin as Kevin
- Susan Walters as Robin
- Kale Brown as Vince Dawkan
- Karen Allen as Betty Dawkan
- Michael Moertl as Dean
- Ken Olin as Gregory
- Richard Fancy as Murdstone
- Earl Carroll as "Heep"
- Ian Gomez as Scott
- Matt Roth as Todd
- Karen Mayo-Chandler as Awful Truth Woman
- Anthony Guidera as Maitre D'
- John Hawkes as Gawayne
- Alexa Jago as Suzanne
- Jack Kruschen as Mr. Katz
- Danielle Keaton as Chelsea
- Julio Oscar Mechoso as The Mover
- Tiffany Paulsen as Tiffany
- William Utay as Paul Pullman
- Annabelle Gurwitch as Woman in Bathroom
- Dave Mallow as Newscaster Voice (voice) (uncredited)

== Box office ==
The film opened at number 10 at the North American box office making $1.3 million USD in its opening weekend.

== Production ==
'Til There Was You had a reported production budget of $23 million. The film was the feature directorial debut of Scott Winant, who had previously worked primarily in television.

In January 1996, Terence Blanchard and Miles Goodman were hired to compose the music for the film. Director Scott Winant approved the duo, thinking the comical mastery of Goodman and the jazzy romance of Blanchard would make the perfect combination. Blanchard was so excited about collaborating with Goodman that he rearranged his summer tour of The Heart Speaks around Goodman's ever-busy scoring schedule. 'Til There Was You would be the final film scored by Goodman; he died a year before the film's release, aged 47. The film is dedicated to his memory.

== Critical reception ==
The film was panned by critics during its release. On the review aggregator website Rotten Tomatoes, 5% of 40 critics' reviews are positive, with an average rating of 4/10. The website's consensus reads: "Utterly bereft of romance or humor, 'Til There Was You is a singularly misguided attempt at romantic comedy."

Roger Ebert, then of the Chicago Sun-Times rated the film 1/2 star and called it "the most tiresome and affected movie in many a moon, a 114-minute demonstration of the Idiot Plot, in which everything could be solved with a few well-chosen words that are never spoken . . . and at the end of it all, we have the frustration of knowing that 114 minutes of our lives have been wasted, never to be returned . . . All comes together at the end. Landmarks are saved, hearts are mended, long-deferred love is realized, coincidences are explained, the past is healed, the future is assured, the movie is over. I liked the last part the best."

Ruthe Stein of the San Francisco Chronicle observed, "Filmmakers should be careful about using snippets from old movies. In 'Til There Was You, there's a tender scene from Brief Encounter that says more about fate and the serendipity of falling in love in two minutes than this new movie does in two hours . . . 'Til There Was You hammers away at the idea that people don't find love until they're ready for it. The notion is convenient as a way of keeping Gwen and Nick apart, but it's not true. People are always meeting at inconvenient times. That's what Brief Encounter is about. First-time screenwriter Winnie Holzman may have been aware of the lameness of her central premise because she has loaded the movie with a dizzying number of subplots . . . Directing his first film after many years as a television producer, Scott Winant seems at a loss to know how to integrate these disparate elements. They come across like episodes of Seinfeld or Friends . . . Tripplehorn and McDermott don't look as if they belong together and aren't strong enough actors to overcome their physical incompatibility. So there's no sense of urgency about them getting together, as there was with Meg Ryan and Tom Hanks in Sleepless in Seattle. Tripplehorn in particular makes an unlikely romantic lead; she's dull at the times she should sparkle. By contrast, Sarah Jessica Parker is the life of the movie. As Francesca . . . she appears to be doing a Madonna impersonation, grabbing the screen and holding it with the force of her personality, not to mention her cleavage."

Barbara Shulgasser of the San Francisco Examiner noted "what makes the intermittently charming, intelligent and funny 'Til There Was You so intermittently dull, loose and meandering is that the filmmakers thought they could pack the contents of more TV episodes into one movie than any movie should be required to hold. The tangled 114 minutes feel like years."

Leonard Klady of Variety stated, "A tired piece of romantic cornball fare that harks back to a bygone era, the film is a badly conceived, poorly executed fairy tale guaranteed to make audiences squirm in their seats . . . Winnie Holzman's script is one of those filigree fantasies in need of an experienced, stylish filmmaker. Tyro feature director Scott Winant simply doesn't fit the bill, going for the obvious and banal . . . But ultimately, 'Til There Was You doesn't work because its leads lack charm, and the viewer remains indifferent as to whether they get together at the close."

== Home media release ==
Paramount Home Video released 'Til There Was You on videotape and Region 1 DVD on December 11, 2001. The film is in the anamorphic widescreen format with an audio track and subtitles in English. There are no bonus features. The film has never been released in high definition.
