= Livi Zheng =

Indonesian producer and actress (born 1989)

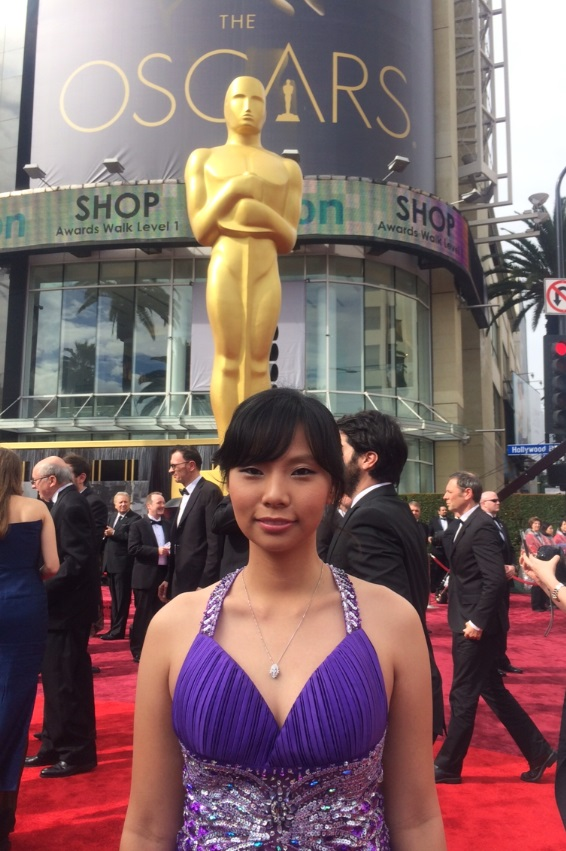
- Born: April 3, 1989 (age 36); East Java, Indonesia
- Education: University of Washington (BA); University of Southern California (MFA)
- Occupations: Producer; Director; Screenwriter; Actress; Stuntwoman
- Years active: 2004–present
- Website: livizheng.com

Livi Zheng (born April 3, 1989) is an Indonesian producer, director, actress, and stuntwoman. She began her career as a stuntwoman at the age of fifteen and has since produced and directed Brush with Danger (2014), Bali: Beats of Paradise (2018), and Insight (2021).

== Early life and education ==
Zheng was born in Blitar, East Java, Indonesia on April 3, 1989. A few years after she was born, Zheng and her family moved to Jakarta, Indonesia. Zheng attended elementary and middle school in Indonesia, and while working on her stunt career, Zheng attended the Western Academy of Beijing. After graduating from the Western Academy, Zheng attended the University of Washington, where she earned her bachelor's degree in economics, and was inducted into the International Economics Honor Society. Upon graduation, she pursued her master's degree at the University of Southern California's School of Cinematic Arts. In 2016, Zheng graduated and received her MFA in Film Production.

Zheng has one younger brother, Ken, who is also involved with film and martial arts.

== Career ==
Zheng's career in the film industry began when she was 15 as a stunt performer in Indonesia. She says she did stunts in the television series Laksamana Cheng Ho which aired on Metro TV in 2008 and starred former State Secretary Yusril Ihza Mahendra in the titular role as well as actor and director Slamet Rahardjo. She produced two feature films titled The Empire Throne and Legend of the East were a few years later in 2013 and 2014 with Mahendra and Zheng also involved telling a similar story as the television series.

Livi produced and directed her first feature film Brush with Danger at the age of 23. Brush with Danger is an action film shot in Seattle that Zheng also co-starred in with her brother Ken. It tells a story about a painter and a fighter, who are also siblings who were forced to flee their home, and soon find themselves embroiled in Seattle's criminal underworld. Brush with Danger was released theatrically both in the US and internationally in 2014.

After Brush with Danger, Livi produced and directed Bali: Beats of Paradise starring Judith Hill, Nyoman Wenten and Nanik Wenten. Bali: Beats a Paradise is a story about husband and wife gamelan artists visually and musically express a lifetime of love and passion with a capstone - a music video that blends the funk style with gamelan.

During an appearance on a Metro TV program in September 2019, directors Joko Anwar and John De Rantau said that Zheng had misrepresented her films' achievements, including by claiming that Bali: Beats of Paradise had been nominated for an Academy Award for Best Picture. Zheng defended herself: "I never said that my movie was nominated for the Oscars. I said it was in contention to be selected as nominees for the Academy Awards. It is not easy to get your films screened in American theaters." (Films must be screened theatrically in the United States in order to be eligible for the Oscars.) In a second interview with Metro TV, Zheng provided evidence to rebut the accusations from the previous interview.

Livi's film Insight was released on March 12, 2021. Insight tells a story about clairvoyant counter terrorism agent who joins forces with an LAPD detective, to seek justice for her murdered brother while uncovering the mission of a high-tech criminal. In February 2021, Deadline reported that Gravitas Ventures picked up the North American distribution rights for Zheng's action film Insight, which stars her brother Ken alongside Sean Patrick Flanery, Tony Todd, Keith David, and Madeline Zima.

== Awards ==
In 2018, Zheng received the Culture Ambassador Award at the Unforgettable Gala along with Jon M. Chu and John Cho that was held on December 8, 2018, in Beverly Hilton, Beverly Hills. In 2019 Zheng was the recipient of Tourism Marketeers of the Year award.

== Filmography ==
=== Film ===
| Year | Title | Role |
|---|---|---|
| 2014 | Brush with Danger | Producer, director, actress |
| 2018 | Queen of The Hill | Director, producer |
| 2018 | Bali: Beats of Paradise | Director, producer |
| 2019 | Vibrant Jakarta | Director, producer |
| 2020 | After the NBA: The Second Rise of Mike Bibby | Director, producer |
| 2021 | Insight | Director, producer |

=== Television ===
| Year | Title | Role | Featured episodes | Notes |
|---|---|---|---|---|
| 2013 | A Day with a Star | Self | 1 | Interview |
