= Yvonne Zima =

American actress (born 1989)

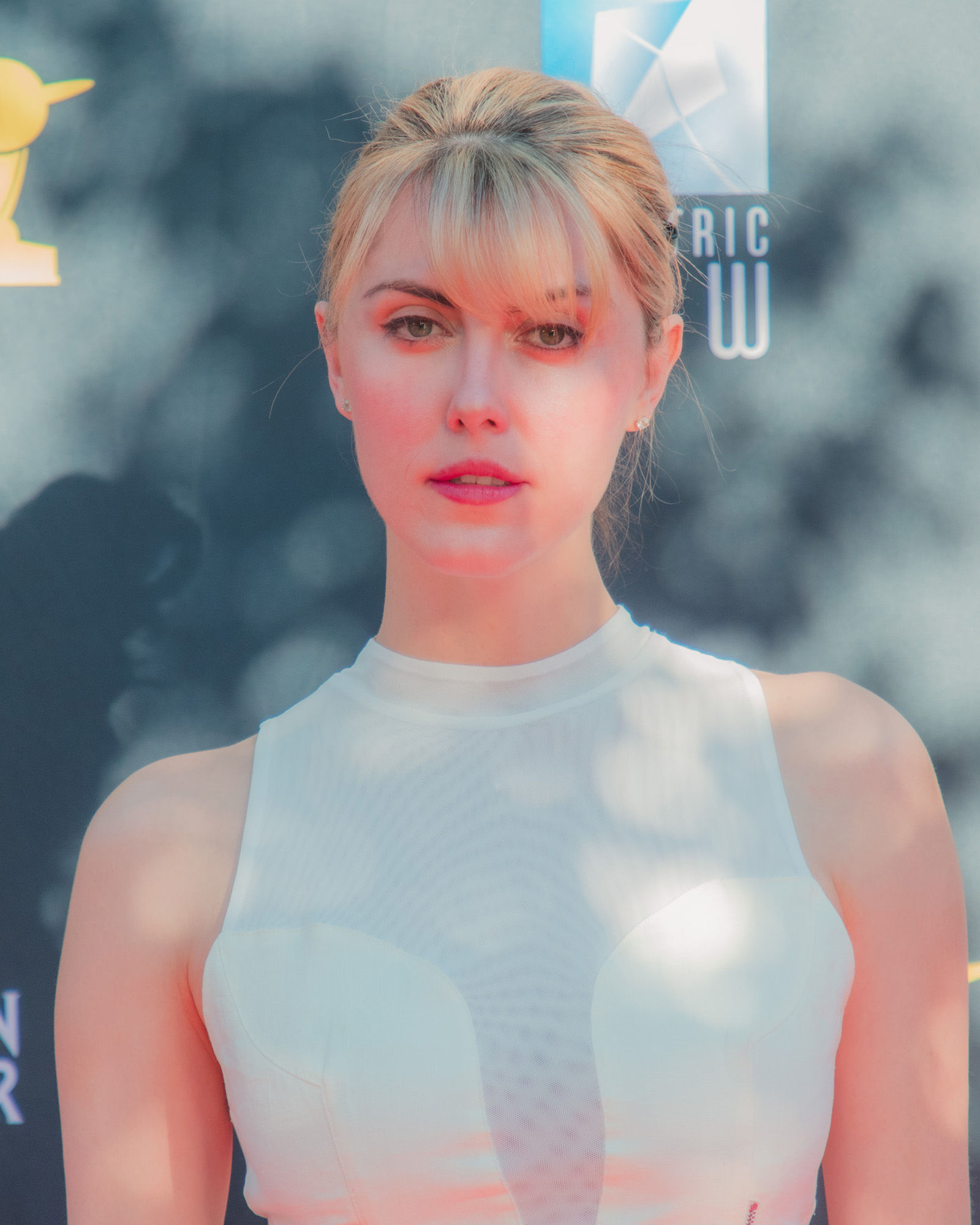
- Zima in 2026
- Born: Yvonne Marie Zima; January 16, 1989 (age 37); Phillipsburg, New Jersey, U.S.
- Occupation: Actress
- Years active: 1993–present
- Relatives: Madeline Zima (sister); Vanessa Zima (sister)

Yvonne Marie Zima (born January 16, 1989) is an American actress and screenwriter. She is best known for her role as Daisy Carter on The Young and the Restless.

== Background ==
Zima was born in Phillipsburg, New Jersey, the daughter of Dennis and Marie. She was raised in Easton, Pennsylvania. Her older sisters, Madeline Zima and Vanessa Zima are also actresses. Her surname means "winter" in Polish and comes from her maternal grandfather, who was of Polish descent.

== Acting career ==
Zima played a small part in the movie Heat (1995) where she was briefly taken hostage and rescued by Al Pacino's character. Her first major role was being cast as Caitlin, the daughter of Geena Davis' character, in the film The Long Kiss Goodnight (1996). She also played Rachel Greene on the series ER from 1994 to 2000. Zima portrayed Daisy on the series The Young and the Restless on and off between 2009 and 2012.

== Writing career ==
At 16, Zima wrote a novel titled The Rise and Fall of a Deliberate Weirdo. In 2011, she and her sisters planned a film together, with Yvonne writing the script. She also co-wrote the episode "Acts of Grace" for the HBO Max series Our Flag Means Death. The episode was submitted for Emmy consideration under the Outstanding Writing for a Comedy Series category, but did not receive a nomination. The show's writing team was nominated for the Ray Bradbury Award in 2023.

== Filmography ==
Film roles
Year	Title	Role	Notes	Ref.
1995	Heat	Hostage Girl		
1995	See Jane Run	Lisa Klinger	ABC television film	
1996	Christmas Every Day	Sarah Jackson	The Family Channel television film	
1996	Bed of Roses	Young Lisa Walker		
1996	Executive Decision	Little Girl		
1996	The Long Kiss Goodnight	Caitlin Caine		
1997	Dead by Midnight	Kelly Ellis	ABC television film	
1997	'Til There Was You	Gwen Moss (Age 7)		
1999	Storm Catcher	Nicole Holloway		
1999	The Secret Path	Jo-Ann Foley (Age 7)	CBS television film; also titled Chasing Secrets	
2000	A Father's Choice	Chris McClain	CBS television film	
2000	Love & Sex	9-Year-Old Kate		
2009	Surrogate	Marian		
2009	Love Hurts	Andrea		
2010	You, Only Better...	Suzy Jr.		
2011	The Absent	Katie Anderson		
2011	Goy	Trish Rosenberg		
2011	Meeting Spencer	Sophia Martinelli		
2013	Iron Man 3	Miss Elkridge		
2014	The Girl He Met Online	Gillian Casey	Lifetime television film	
2014	The Last Light	Ashley		
2015	The Automatic Hate	Annie Green		
2016	Killing Mommy	Deborah Hansen / Juliana Hansen	Lifetime television film; also known as Deadly Daughters	
2016	The Nice Guys	Young Porn Queen		
2017	The Monster Project	Shayla		
2018	Warm Human Magic	Mary	short film	
2019	The Orchard Girl	Orchard Girl	short film	
2020	Killer Prom	Sienna Markle	Lifetime television film	
2024	Stan Behavior	Acquittal Queen	short film	
2025	Play Dirty	Traci		

Television roles
Year	Title	Role	Notes	Ref.
1993	Roseanne	Girl in Lunch Box	Episode: "The Driver's Seat"; uncredited	
1994–2000	ER	Rachel Greene	Recurring role, 22 episodes	
1999	Seven Days	Amanda	Episode: "For the Children"	
2009–2012	The Young and the Restless	Daisy Carter	Recurring role, 137 episodes	
2012	BlackBoxTV	Bianca	Episode: "The Last Encounter"	
2013	Law & Order: Special Victims Unit	Jessie Sturgis	Episode: "Beautiful Frame"	
2013	Castle	Veronica	Episode: "Time Will Tell"	
2015	Masters of Sex	Daphne	Episode: "Party of Four"	
2016	The Night Of	Teacher	Episode: "The Season of the Witch"	
2016	StartUp	Megan	3 episodes	
2018	This Is Us	Nicole	Episode: "Sometimes"	
2019	Now Apocalypse	Cat Woman	Episode: "Anywhere Out of the World"	
2019	American Horror Story: 1984	Red	Episode: "Episode 100"	
2022	Our Flag Means Death	Fleur de Maguis	2 episodes	
2025	NCIS	Lana	Episode: "For Better or Worse"	

== Awards and nominations ==
Zima was nominated for a Young Artist Award for three consecutive years.

Year	Award	Category	Work	Result	Refs
1995	Young Artist Awards	Best Performance by an Actress Under 10 in a TV Series	ER	Nominated	
1996	Young Artist Awards	Best Performance by a Young Actress: TV Drama Series	ER	Nominated	
1997	Young Artist Awards	Best Performance in a Feature Film: Actress Age Ten or Under	The Long Kiss Goodnight	Nominated	
2016	Connect Film Festival	Best Ensemble Acting Award (with Brendan Hunt & Joe Ochman)	Snail	Nominated	
2018	Madrid International Film Festival	Best Lead Actress in a Short Film	Warm Human Magic	Nominated	
2019	NewFilmmakers Los Angeles	Best Comedy Actor	Warm Human Magic	Nominated	
2023	Nebula Award	Ray Bradbury Award; Together with: Eliza Jiménez Cossio; Maddie Dai; Zadry Ferrer-Geddes; David Jenkins; Alyssa Lane; John Mahone; William Meny; Simone Nathan; Alex J. Sherman; Adam Stein; Zackery Alexzander Stephens; Jes Tom; Natalie Torres	Our Flag Means Death	Nominated	
