= Paul Garnault =

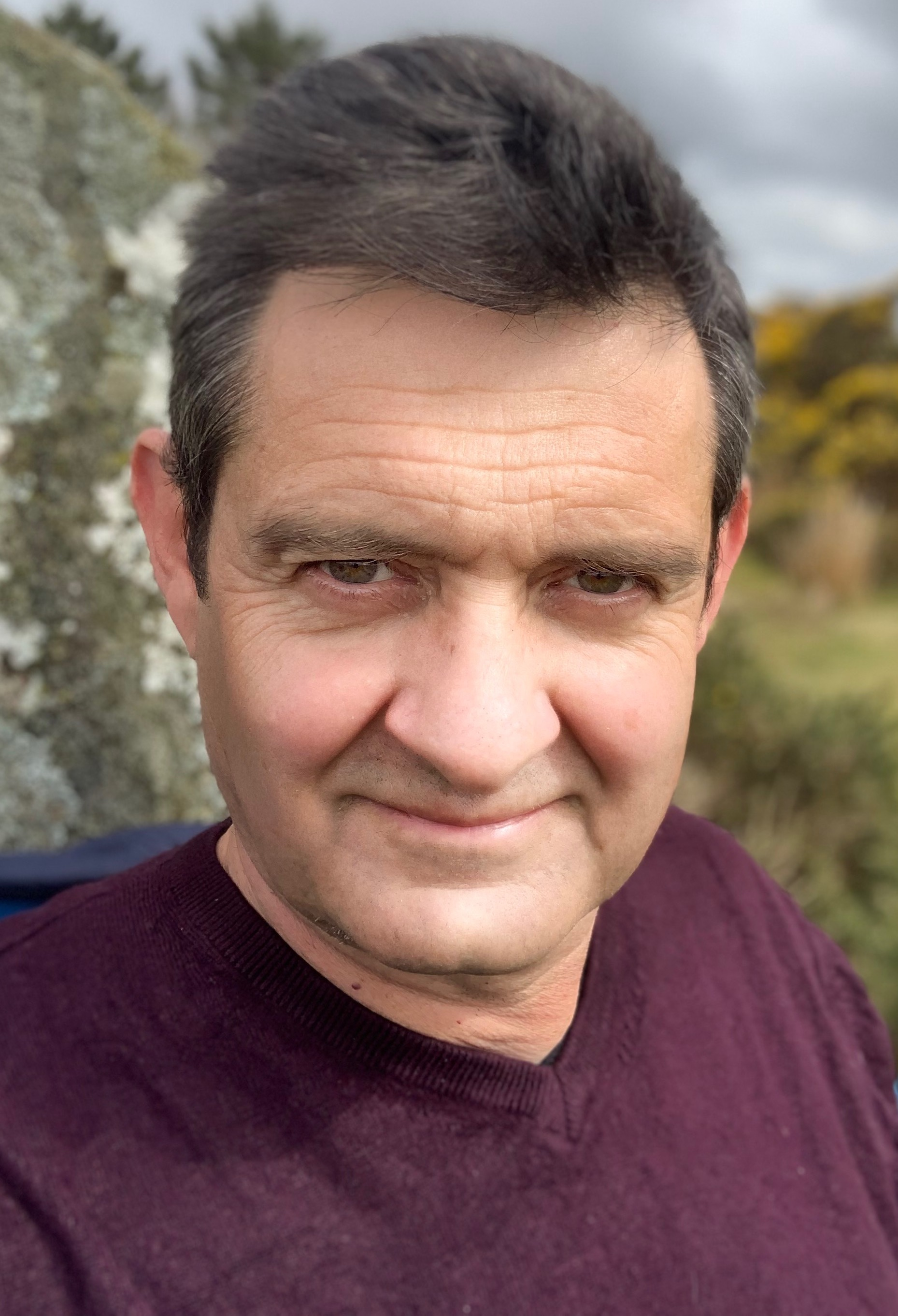
Paul Garnault 2019

Paul Garnault (born 1961) is a Welsh actor, theatre director and educator. He was Head of Academy at Birmingham Metropolitan College and was Principal of Ruskin Mill College in Glouceser and Coleg Plas Dwbl in Wales.(2025). He has also worked in further education management and lectured in performing arts and media production. He is artistic sirector for Wales Actors' Company.

He received training at Powys-Brecon: Ysgol Uwchradd Aberhonddu, in London at East 15 Acting School and at University of Wales, receiving their Post Graduate Certificate of Education (level 6)

== Career ==
=== Director ===
He directed the following plays for Wales Actors' Company:

- 1998 Twelfth Night
- 1999 Hamlet
- 2000 Henry V
- 2001 Romeo and Juliet
- 2001 Macbeth
- 2002 Midsummer Night's Dream
- 2002 The Rover Aphra Behn
- 2003 Dr Faustus by Christopher Marlowe
- 2003 The Tempest
- 2004 Much Ado About Nothing
- 2015/19 Pope Head, Secret Life of Frances Bacon
- 2023/24 Chewdl Taliesin, The Taliesin legends, Peredur, Celtic Mythos Origins

=== Acting ===
He has acted with:

- International Theatre Institute
- Royal Shakespeare Company
- Made In Wales Theatre
- Wales Actors' Company
- Sherman Theatre Company Cardiff
- Stadte Theater Erlangen Germany

=== BBC Television ===
- Private Life of a Masterpiece
- EastEnders
- Oustside The Rules

== Other ==
- 2023: Principal Coleg Plas Dwbl and Ty'r Eithin. Ruskin Mill Trust
- 2019-23: Director of Development Wales and Performing Arts. Ruskin Mill Trust
- 2016-18: Principal Ruskin Mill College, Stroud.
- 2015-18: Principal Coleg Plas Dwbl, Wales
- 2010: Head of the Academy for Performing Arts, Birmingham Metropolitan.

He also worked at the University of Cardiff, Merthyr Tydfil College (for 9 years), Coleg Gwent, Gloucestershire College, and Kidderminster College.

- A founder of the Wales Actors' Company and Artistic Director
- 2006/7 Arts Council of Wales, South Wales Committee.
