= Painkillers (film) =

- Directed by: Roxy Shih
- Written by: Giles Daoust
- Produced by: Luke Barnett; Alain Berliner; Giles Daoust; Vincent Masciale; Catherine Dumonceaux
- Starring: Adam Huss; Madeline Zima; Mischa Barton; Naomi Grossman; Grant Bowler; Debra Wilson
- Cinematography: Felipe Vara de Rey
- Edited by: Brett Noborikawa
- Music by: Dustin Morgan
- Release dates: 12 April 2018 (Brussels International Festival of Fantasy Films); 31 January 2019
- Country: Belgium
- Language: English

Painkillers is a 2018 Belgian drama thriller film directed by Roxy Shih and written by Giles Daoust. The film stars Adam Huss, Madeline Zima and Mischa Barton. It was produced by Lone Suspect and Title Media. Kew Media acquired the title to present it to distributors at the European Film Market in Berlin in February 2018. The film premiered on 12 April 2018 at the Brussels International Fantastic Film Festival. It had a limited theatrical release in the United States on 31 January 2019 before becoming available on VOD platforms on 4 February.

== Plot summary ==
Plagued by guilt following the death of his son in a car crash, John Clarke (Huss), a brilliant surgeon, is visited by the mysterious Herb Morris, who explains that Clarke has contracted an extremely rare form of PTSD, and the only thing that can ease his current pain is the taste of human blood.

== Cast ==
- Adam Huss as John Clarke
- Madeline Zima as Chloe Clarke
- Mischa Barton as Sarah Mendelsohn
- Naomi Grossman as Nurse Sheralyn
- Grant Bowler as Herb Morris
- Debra Wilson as Gail Konrad
