= Paradox (2016 film) =

- Directed by: Michael Hurst
- Written by: Michael Hurst
- Produced by: Rick Benattar; Nigel Thomas
- Starring: Zoë Bell; Malik Yoba; Adam Huss
- Cinematography: E. Gustavo Petersen
- Edited by: Robert Meyer Burnett
- Music by: Alexander Bornstein
- Distributed by: XLrator Media
- Release date: April 15, 2016
- Running time: 90 minutes
- Country: United States
- Language: English

Paradox is an American science fiction action film written and directed by Michael Hurst. Zoë Bell and Adam Huss play scientists who invent a time travel machine. When the machine reveals that one of their team may be a saboteur, they attempt to unravel the mystery with the help of their mysterious benefactor, played by Malik Yoba.

== Plot ==
NSA agents Vukovich and Traxler observe a group of scientists outside a warehouse. Vukovich identifies them as William Wishman, an arrogant researcher expelled from M.I.T.; Lewis Aberricki, a technician whose drunken accident left him reliant on a wheelchair; Randy Fraker, a brilliant astrophysicist; Jim and Gale, who are dating; and their mysterious boss, Mr. Landau. Vukovich says an undercover agent has infiltrated the group but has revealed little information.

The team has invented a time machine. Landau upsets Jim's teammates by selecting him as the first test subject. To dissuade Landau, Aberricki, Wishman, and Fraker privately ridicule Jim's importance. Landau says this makes Jim a better prospect because he is expendable. Abbericki records the entire conversation. Meanwhile, Jim tells Gale that his father was a compulsive gambler who died poor, a fate he will do anything to avoid.

At 11pm, Jim is sent an hour into the future. He finds the lab in disarray and a decapitated body. While searching for survivors, Jim finds Aberricki mortally wounded. Aberricki hands Jim his camera and dies. Gale screams in the distance, but Jim is too late to stop someone from pulling her into an elevator. Jim retreats to the time machine and returns seconds after his departure. Outside the warehouse, Vukovich orders a team to assault the warehouse, but an electrical malfunction leaves the elevator to the lab temporarily inoperable.

Jim's teammates disbelieve his story. Aberricki works to access the camera, and Wishman leaves with a pistol to investigate the future. Within seconds, his head is sent back. Now panicking, the scientists discuss sending someone to warn themselves in the past, but Fraker says this could cause a causality paradox. Aberricki accesses footage on the camera, which plays the recorded session where Jim's teammates trash him. Embarrassed, they apologize. Later footage on the camera shows their discovery of Fraker's corpse. Freaked out, Fraker agrees to send himself to the past. Fraker is murdered before he can convince anyone of the danger.

A masked assailant attacks Jim with a knife. Gale fights the assailant off, revealing herself as an NSA agent. Feeling betrayed, Jim accuses her of using him, but she insists they focus on identifying the assailant. Suspicion falls upon Landau when he turns up wielding a knife, though he denies being the assailant. In his briefcase, they find a disc that indicates he is from the future. Landau says someone named Max Devlin sent him the disc, which contains information he used to make a fortune in the past. Landau believes Devlin to possibly be an alias created by a future version of himself. Landau needed them to create this prototype time machine, which he says causes brain damage, before he could perfect a safer version. Believing Jim to be an NSA spy, Landau forced him to be the test subject. Enraged, Jim savagely beats Landau.

Depressed that everything has happened according to the footage from the future, Aberricki resigns himself to his death; after stabbing Aberricki, the masked assailant sets Landau free. Jim goes to the time machine to meet Wishman, who is due to arrive. Landau and Jim attempt to convince Wishman of each other's guilt; eventually, Jim disarms Wishman, and Landau sends Wishman's head into the past. The masked assailant reveals himself as a future version of Jim who is missing an eye. Stunned, Jim denies that he could kill anyone, but the future Jim says he resents his teammates, Landau, and Gale. Now believing Jim to be Devlin, Landau insists they are working together. Future Jim kills Landau; horrified, Gale attempts to convince Jim that he can fight this fate. When this seems to fail, Gale puts out one of his eyes. Growing increasingly resentful, Jim agrees to murder his teammates.

The version of Jim from 11pm sees his future self kidnap Gale and flee to the elevator, which the NSA agents have repaired. Jim's future self attempts to take the disc from Gale, but she kills him. When the NSA agents rescue her, she reveals her real name is Maxine Devlin, and she handles the disc thoughtfully.

== Cast ==
- Zoë Bell as Gale
- Malik Yoba as Mr. Landau
- Adam Huss as Jim
- Bjørn Alexander as Lewis Aberricki
- Brian Flaccus as William Wishman
- Michael Aaron Milligan as Randy Fraker
- Steve Suh as Van Lang

== Production ==
Writer-director Michael Hurst was influenced by James Cameron's films, and he named most of the characters after The Terminator's cast and crew. Besides the Cameron influence, Hurst said he was aiming to appeal to fans of Timecrimes and Primer. Hurst cast Bell because he wanted a strong female lead, much like the Terminator series. Bell had been suggested by XLrator Media. Actor Malik Yorba used a British accent for his character, Mr. Landau. The accent disappears later in the film, once Landau admits that he is an American from the future, not an upper class British businessman. Yorba said he saw the character as someone who would attempt to appear as upper-class as possible. He also wanted to use his skill at accents, which he said was not something he was able to do often.

== Release ==
XLrator Media released the film theatrically on April 15, 2016. Four days later, it was released on video on demand.

== Reception ==
Martin Tsai of the Los Angeles Times wrote that the central mystery is interesting enough to distract from the film's flaws, but the writing suffers from a tendency to explicitly state everything instead of showing it.
