= East 15 Acting School =

Drama school in Loughton, Essex, United Kingdom

Coordinates: 51.6495°N 0.0768°E

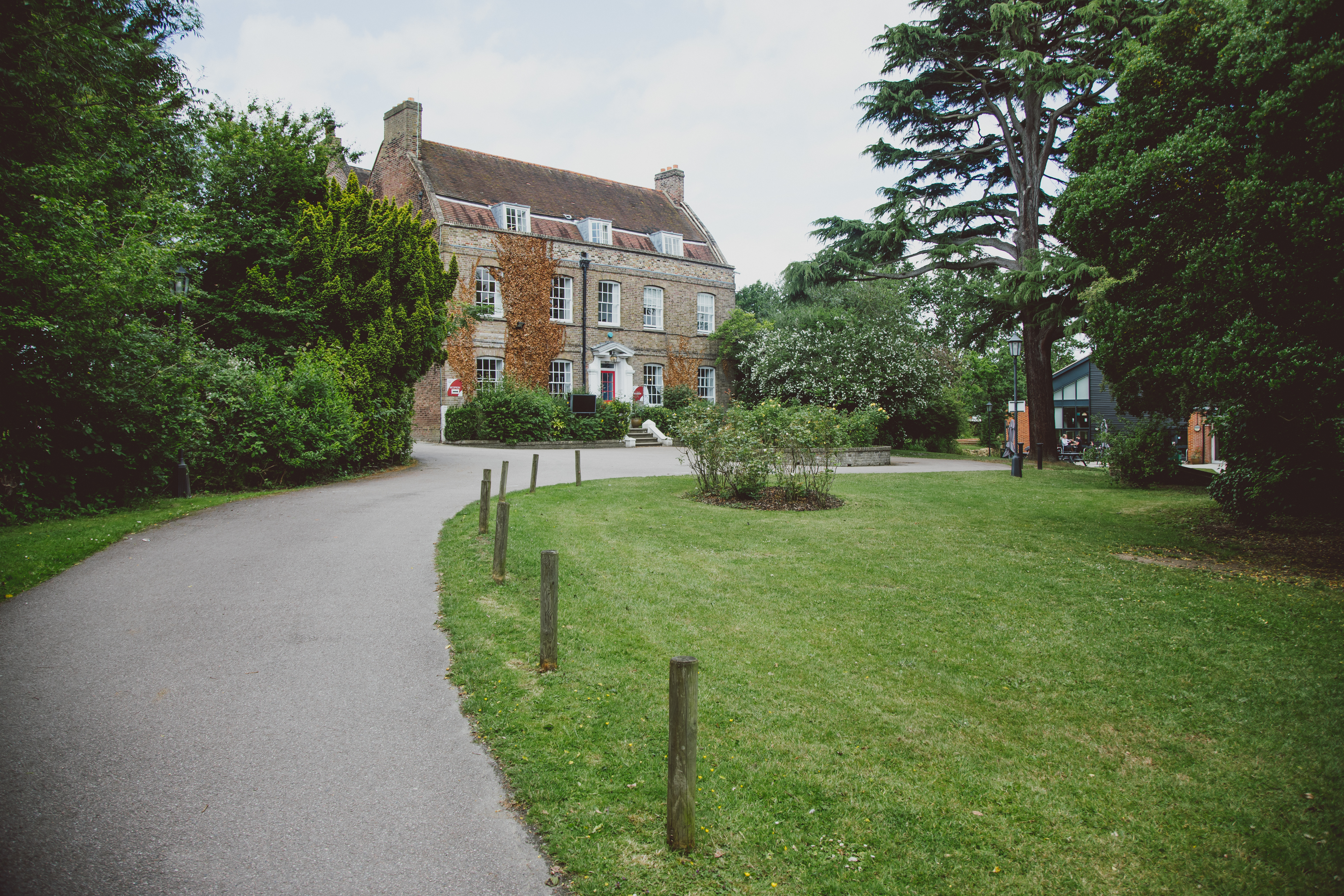
- Hatfields House, Loughton Campus
- Other name: East 15
- Type: Public
- Established: 1961; 2000 – merged with University of Essex
- Parent institution: University of Essex
- Affiliations: Federation of Drama Schools
- Director: Chris Main
- Location: Loughton, Essex, UK
- Website: www.east15.ac.uk
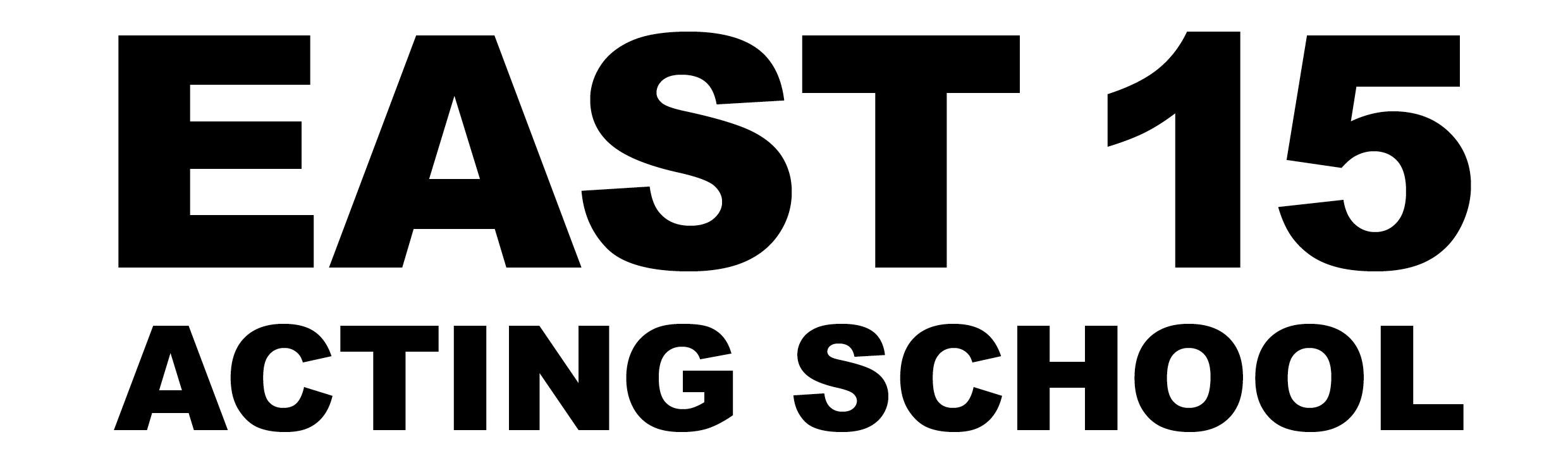

East 15 Acting School, sometimes known simply as East 15, is a drama school based in Essex, England. It provides vocational training in acting, specialist performance disciplines, theatre directing, stage management, and creative producing. The school was established in 1961 by Margaret Bury, a member of Joan Littlewood's Theatre Workshop. Since 2000, its degrees are conferred by the University of Essex.

== History ==
East 15 Acting School was founded in 1961 by Margaret Bury.

East 15 draws its origins from the work of Joan Littlewood's Theatre Workshop. Margaret Bury was part of the Theatre Workshop for 14 years before starting East 15 Acting School in 1961. She drew on the teaching methods and philosophies of the Theatre Workshop, and its guiding principles continue to inform East 15's teaching and productions today.

In 2000, East 15 established its partnership with the University of Essex. At its inception, Essex's founding Vice-Chancellor, Sir Albert Sloman, emphasised that "radical innovation" would be at the heart of its approach, including new specialist performance courses and the creation of new facilities, including the Clifftown Theatre at Southend, and a motion capture studio served by 30 Vicon sensors.

In 2025 it was announced that the University of Essex would be leaving Southend at a cost of 400 jobs.

== Description ==
East 15 is located in the county of Essex in England. The school provides vocational training in acting, specialist performance disciplines, theatre directing, stage management, and creative producing. It offers a number of undergraduate and postgraduate courses. Its campus is located in Loughton and, until 2026, also in Southend-on-Sea. Its degrees are awarded by the University of Essex, with which it merged on 1 September 2000.

Since around 2014 and as of January 2025 the director of East 15 is Chris Main.

East 15 is a member of the Federation of Drama Schools.

== Ranking ==
In 2025, East 15, as part of the University of Essex, was ranked number one in the UK in The Guardian″s ranking for drama and dance.

== Notable alumni ==
Notable graduates from East 15 include:

- Maisie Adam
- Arsher Ali
- Patricia Allison
- Peter Armitage
- Annette Badland
- Marcus Bentley
- Linnea Berthelsen
- David L. Boushey
- Sian Breckin
- Corinna Brown
- Marji Campi
- Ian Champion
- Nathan Clarke
- Peter Cleall
- Susannah Corbett
- Stephen Daldry
- April De Angelis
- Janine Duvitski
- Precious Mustapha
- Alan Ford
- Paul Garnault
- Alex Giannini
- Chris Haywood
- Elizabeth Henstridge
- The Kipper Kids
- Gabriella Leon
- Kevin Lloyd
- John McArdle
- Sera-Lys McArthur
- Ann Mitchell
- Diane Morgan
- Billy Murray
- Michael Parr
- Vicki Pepperdine
- Jenny Platt
- George Rossi
- Chris Ryan
- Ruth Sheen
- Marlene Sidaway
- Kiell Smith-Bynoe
- Alison Steadman
- Gwen Taylor
- Abigail Thorn
- Kraig Thornber
- Oliver Tobias
- Rhydian Vaughan
- Steven Waddington
- Clive Wedderburn
- Kate Williams
- David Yip
- Meng'er Zhang
- Philip Hedley
- Kyran Thrax
- Daniel Ezra
- Melissa Johns

Damon Albarn and Marc Warren attended the institution but did not graduate.
