= Malik Yoba =

American actor (born 1967)

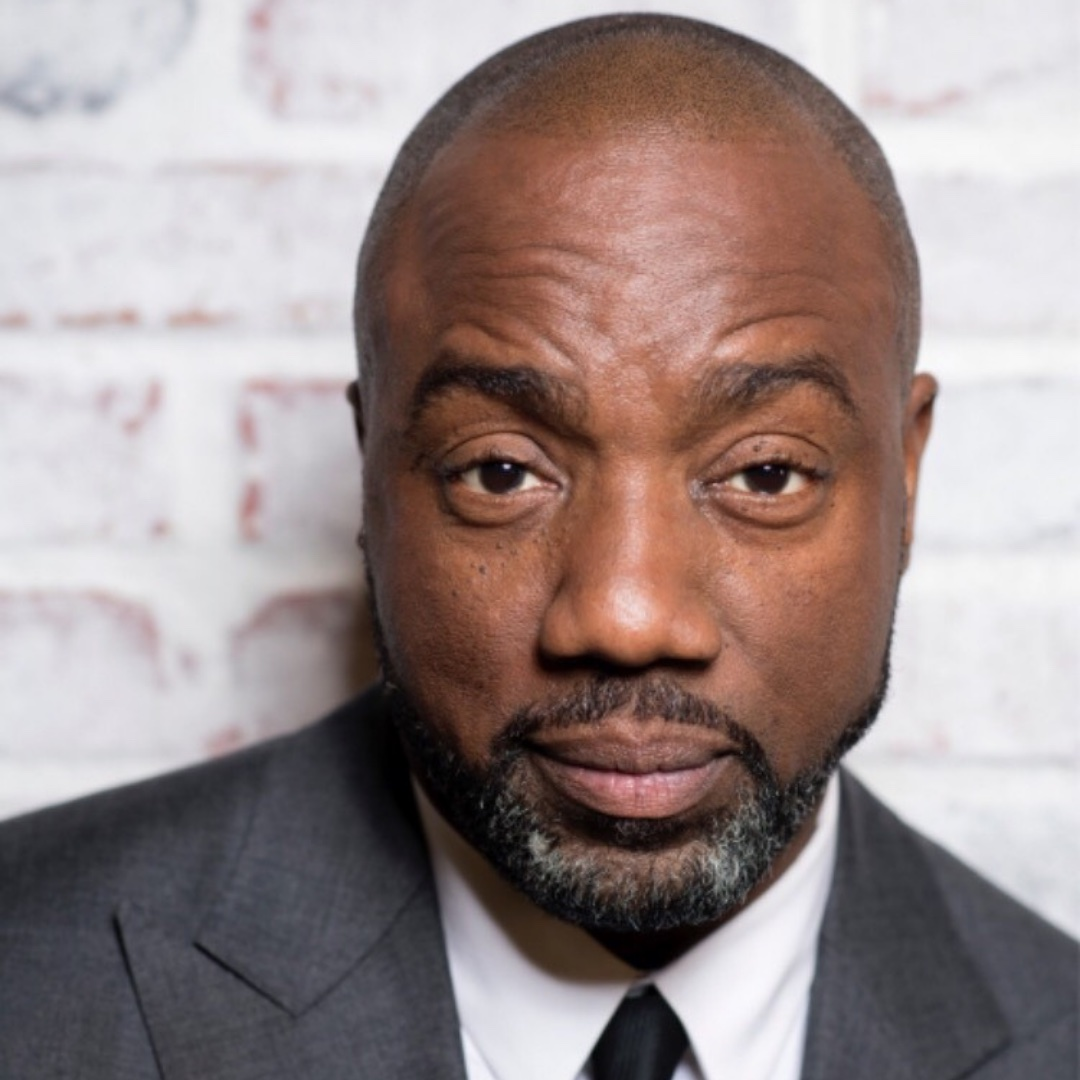
- Born: Abdul-Malik Kashie Yoba; September 17, 1967 (age 59); New York City, U.S.
- Occupation: Actor
- Years active: 1993–present
- Known for: New York Undercover; Alphas; Designated Survivor; Revolution
- Spouse: Cat Wilson (2003–2010)
- Children: 3

Abdul-Malik Kashie Yoba (born September 17, 1967) is an American actor. He is known for his starring role as NYPD Detective J. C. Williams on the Fox police drama New York Undercover and as Yul Brenner in the film Cool Runnings. He appeared as former FBI agent Bill Harken on the Syfy drama series Alphas, as Jim Hudson in Revolution, and as Vernon Turner in Empire. He also starred in the role of FBI Deputy Director Jason Atwood in the ABC political drama Designated Survivor. In 2018, he joined the Netflix drama Seven Seconds as a member of a support group for parents who had lost their children. He also appeared in Jordan Peele’s TBS comedy The Last OG with Tracy Morgan.

== Early life ==
The fourth of six children, Yoba was born in the Bronx, New York to Mahmoudah Young (née Lanier) and Abdullah Yoba. He was raised in a devout Muslim household. His family had no television set and he was not allowed to do the Pledge of Allegiance. He was not allowed to wear a kufi in school which led his father to protest. He would often go to Yonkers, New York to fill water. He was raised in Harlem, New York.

== Career ==
In 1994, Yoba began his role on the popular Fox police drama series New York Undercover, opposite Michael DeLorenzo. Yoba and DeLorenzo made television history, as the series was the first police drama on American television to feature two people of color in the starring roles. Yoba's work on New York Undercover earned him three consecutive NAACP Image Awards for Outstanding Actor in a Drama Series (in 1996, 1997, and 1998).

An accomplished singer and stage actor, Yoba's talents were showcased in His Woman His Wife, in which he had the lead role.

Yoba has also appeared in films such as Cool Runnings and Criminal. He has made appearances on the FOX television series Arrested Development as Ice, a bounty hunter whose real love is party planning. Yoba had a recurring role as Brock Harris on the UPN sitcom Girlfriends. He also appeared in the FX Network's crime drama Thief and the NBC crime drama Raines. He appeared as Gavin in the 2007 Tyler Perry film Why Did I Get Married? and its 2010 sequel Why Did I Get Married Too? In 2009, he co-starred as astronaut Ted Shaw on the futuristic ABC drama Defying Gravity. In 2010, he announced his plans to bring back New York Undercover to the small screen in a modern TV series adaptation of the original series. Law & Order writer Courtney Parker penned a spec script for networks to bid on.

From 2011 to 2012, Yoba appeared as former FBI Special Agent Bill Harken on Alphas, a science fiction drama series about a team of people with special abilities who belong to a secret department attached to the Defense Department. In 2013, Yoba joined the cast of Revolution as Jim Hudson, a former captain of the Monroe Republic. In 2015, he joined the cast of Lee Daniels' Empire as Vernon Turner, Lucious Lyon's business partner and chairman of Empire Entertainment, playing the character through the first season. In 2019, Yoba premiered his one-man stage play, Harlem to Hollywood, at New York's Apollo Theater. The autobiographical show features Yoba performing original music and playing twenty different characters.

== Other ventures ==
In 2017, Yoba established his company Yoba Development, hoping to provide young people of color with access to the real estate industry. Yoba Development currently has active real estate projects in Baltimore and New York City. In 2019, he served as executive producer and director for The Real Estate Mixtape: Volume 1, I Build NY, a docu-series which follows Yoba as he navigates his first commercial real estate deal in NYC.

== Personal life ==
On December 21, 2003, Yoba married actress Cat Wilson. They later divorced, following a separation in 2010. He was previously engaged to actress Trisha Mann, with whom he has one daughter. Yoba has another daughter and a son from a prior relationship with Terry Vega.

In 2019, Yoba took to social media to announce he would be a participant in the National Trans Visibility March in Washington, D.C., and publicly revealed he is attracted to trans women. It has since been alleged by trans activist Mariah Lopez Ebony that Yoba engaged in inappropriate paid sexual activity with her when she was a minor. Though Yoba denies the allegation, as a result of the media storm regarding the controversial accusation, Yoba was removed from his position as spokesman for Phi Beta Sigma, which is focused on providing mentorship to "pre-teen and teen-aged males" through social, cultural and educational enrichment.

In the summer of 2021, Yoba underwent quadruple bypass surgery as a result of hereditary heart disease. He is an advocate of plant-based nutrition and walking as medicine. In 2022, Yoba received an honorary Doctor of Humane Letters from Livingstone College in Salisbury, North Carolina.

== Filmography ==
=== Film ===
| Year | Title | Role | Notes |
|---|---|---|---|
| 1993 | Cool Runnings | Yul Brenner | |
| 1995 | Smoke | The Creeper | |
| 1995 | Blue in the Face | Watch Man | |
| 1997 | Cop Land | Detective Carson | |
| 1997 | Soul Food | Studio Engineer | |
| 1998 | Ride | Poppa | |
| 2001 | Night Class | Tommy Reed | a.k.a. Seduced by a Thief |
| 2003 | Playas Ball | Himself | |
| 2004 | Criminal | Frank Hill | |
| 2005 | Kids in America | Will Drucker | |
| 2007 | Why Did I Get Married? | Gavin | |
| 2007 | Feel the Noise | The Mayor | |
| 2010 | Why Did I Get Married Too? | Gavin | |
| 2016 | Paradox | Mr. Landau | |
| 2017 | 'Til Death Do Us Part | Rob | |
| 2018 | Take Point | Gerald | |
| 2019 | Awake | Frank Ward | |
| 2022 | The Good Nurse | Sam Johnson | |

=== Television ===
| Year | Title | Role | Notes |
|---|---|---|---|
| 1993 | Where I Live | Fisher | 1 episode |
| 1994 | Law & Order | Pat Williams | 1 episode |
| 1994–1999 | New York Undercover | Detective Julius Clarence "J.C." Williams | Main role |
| 1998 | For Your Love | Keith | 1 episode |
| 1999 | Trinity | Sam Davis | 2 episodes |
| 2000–2001 | Bull | Corey Granville | Main role |
| 2003 | Kingpin | Bobby Curtis | 3 episodes |
| 2003 | The Twilight Zone | Shawn | Episode: "Developing" |
| 2003–2007 | Girlfriends | Brock Harris | Recurring role |
| 2004 | The Days | Gib Taylor | 4 episodes |
| 2004 | Arrested Development | Ice | 2 episodes |
| 2006 | Thief | Elmo "Mo" Jones | Miniseries |
| 2006 | That's So Raven | Judge | 1 episode |
| 2007 | Raines | Charlie Lincoln | Main role |
| 2008 | CSI: Miami | Reggie Mastow | 1 episode |
| 2009 | Defying Gravity | Ted Shaw | Main role |
| 2010 | Justified | Toby Griffin | 1 episode |
| 2011 | The Celibate Nympho Chronicles: The Web Series | Bustah | 1 episode |
| 2011 | Nikita | Wallace | 1 episode |
| 2011–2012 | Alphas | Bill Harken | Main role |
| 2012 | Person of Interest | Andre Wilcox | Episode: "Wolf and Cub" |
| 2012 | NYC 22 | Ray-Ray Burnell | 1 episode |
| 2013 | Revolution | Jim Hudson | 4 episodes |
| 2013 | The Glades | Landon Givens | 1 episode |
| 2013 | The Good Wife | Eddie Fornum | 1 episode |
| 2013 | Betty & Coretta | Martin Luther King Jr. | TV movie |
| 2014 | Turks & Caicos | Jim Carroll | TV movie |
| 2015 | Empire | Vernon Turner | Main role |
| 2015 | Limitless | Rooney / John Kellerman | 1 episode |
| 2015 & 2024 | Blue Bloods | Detective Darryl Reid | Episodes: "Flags of Our Fathers" & "Loyalty Part 1" |
| 2016 | Justice by Any Means | Him | 1 episode |
| 2016–2017 | Designated Survivor | Jason Atwood | Recurring role |
| 2018 | Seven Seconds | Wes | 1 episode |
| 2018 | Gotham | Major Rodney Harlan | 1 episode |
| 2018 | The Last O.G. | Wavy | Recurring role |
| 2018 | God Friended Me | Terrance | 3 episodes |
| 2019 | First Wives Club | Derek Ellsworth | Main role |
| 2019 | Carl Weber's The Family Business | Randy Moss | Episodes: "The Heat Is On" & "Home Coming" |
| 2022 | East New York | Lamonte Jacobs | 1 episode |
| 2022–2023 | The Equalizer | Manny | 3 episodes |
| 2025 | Kings of Jo'Burg | Isador | Main role |
| 2026 | NCIS New York | Curtis Allen | 1 episode |

=== Video games ===
| Year | Title | Role | Notes |
|---|---|---|---|
| 2016 | The Walking Dead: Michonne | Pete | Voice |

== Awards and recognition ==
American Black Film Festival - Winner, Best Documentary, 2016

NAACP Image Award- Winner, 1996,1997,1998
