= The Secret Path =

1999 American television film

- DVD Release as Chasing Secrets
- Genre: Historical drama
- Based on: Childhood's Thief by Rose Mary Evans
- Teleplay by: Quinton Peeples
- Directed by: Bruce Pittman
- Starring: Della Reese; Ossie Davis; Crystal Bernard; Madeline Zima; Yvonne Zima; Ron White
- Country of origin: United States
- Original language: English

Production
- Cinematography: Manfred Guthe
- Editor: David Codron
- Running time: 120 minutes
- Production company: Robert Greenwald Productions

Original release
- Network: CBS
- Release: April 4, 1999

The Secret Path (also released as Chasing Secrets) is a 1999 American historical drama television film directed by Bruce Pittman. Adapted from Rose Mary Evans' 1994 memoir Childhood's Thief: One Woman's Journey of Healing from Sexual Abuse, the film stars Della Reese, Ossie Davis, and Crystal Bernard. It premiered in the United States on CBS on April 4, 1999.

== Plot ==
Set in rural Tennessee during World War II, fourteen-year-old Jo Ann Foley endures violent abuse at the hands of her boot-legging grandfather, Hank. Forced into prostitution like her mother, Marie, Jo Ann periodically escapes her miserable existence to find comfort with Honey and Too Tall, an African-American couple who offer her love and protection. The friendship ultimately empowers both Jo Ann and Marie to break away from Hank's control and seek a new life.

== Cast ==
- Della Reese as Honey
- Ossie Davis as Too Tall
- Crystal Bernard as Marie Foley
- Madeline Zima as Jo Ann Foley (age 14)
- Yvonne Zima as Jo Ann (age 7)
- Ron White as Hank Foley

== Production ==
The film is loosely based on Childhood's Thief: One Woman's Journey of Healing from Sexual Abuse, the 1994 memoir of therapist Rose Mary Evans. Evans details her accounts of treating JoAnn, a 47-year-old abuse survivor who Evans treated in the years between 1980 and 1986. JoAnn suffered from severe depression and had little memory of her childhood but was determined to reconstruct her past. In a 1996 book review in the journal Psychiatric Services, Boston psychiatrist Elizabeth A. Feigon writes that "between sessions JoAnn produced a voluminous written narrative and some tapes, which [Evans] rewrote for the book as fictionalized episodes of JoAnn's life."

The film was developed by Robert Greenwald Productions, with writers Bill C. Davis and Quinton Peeples adapting Evans' memoir, emphasizing themes of interracial solidarity and survival of childhood abuse. Principal photography took place in Ontario, Canada in late 1998.

== Release ==
The Secret Path was first broadcast on CBS on April 4, 1999, and later aired internationally under the alternative title Chasing Secrets.

The film was released on VHS in 2000 and later on DVD, and became available for digital rental and purchase on Amazon Prime Video.

== Reception ==
In a 1999 Variety review, the film was described as "tonally flat", criticized for its simplistic story and "clichéd and condescendingly preachy" tone alongside "a bland, overtired evocation of Southern racism and misogyny, improbably tempered with a sensitive, piano-heavy score that would be more at home cueing emotions in a production for children."

Retrospective reviews and commentary have praised Reese and Davis's performances and the film's sensitive handling of difficult subject matters.

A 2014 review by British critic Andy Webb applauded the film, describing The Secret Path as a "rich, touching and charming drama which communicates with your soul" and "beautifully crafted, cleverly written and brilliantly acted".

The film was chosen to be preserved in the archive of the Paley Center for Media (formerly the Museum of Television & Radio) in New York City as a culturally or socially significant work.
