= A Father's Choice =

2000 American television film

- Television release poster
- Written by: Richard Leder
- Directed by: Christopher Cain
- Starring: Peter Strauss; Mary McDonnell; Michelle Trachtenberg; Yvonne Zima; Susan Hogan
- Music by: Steve Dorff
- Country of origin: United States
- Original language: English

Production
- Executive producers: Jack Nassar; Joseph Nasser; Bernard Sofronski
- Producers: Eda Lishman; Richard Leder
- Cinematography: William Wages
- Editor: Michael Brown
- Running time: 96 minutes
- Production company: Columbia TriStar Television
- Budget: $6 million (estimated)

Original release
- Network: CBS
- Release: January 12, 2000

A Father's Choice is a 2000 American drama television film starring Peter Strauss, Mary McDonnell, Michelle Trachtenberg, Yvonne Zima and Susan Hogan. It was directed by Christopher Cain and written by Richard Leder. The film aired on January 12, 2000 on CBS.

== Plot ==
Two sisters accustomed with the fast-paced life in Los Angeles are forced to live with their father in the country when their mother is killed.

== Cast ==
- Peter Strauss as Charlie "Mac" McClain
- Mary McDonnell as Susan Shaw
- Michelle Trachtenberg as Kelly McClain
- Yvonne Zima as Chris McClain
- Susan Hogan as Gayle Miller

== Production ==
A Father's Choice was based on a true story and was mostly filmed at the cities of Airdrie and Calgary, Alberta, Canada.

== Reception ==
A Father's Choice gathered some good reviews from critics. The Movie Scene gave the movie a good review, stating: "Director Christopher Cain not only does a nice job of framing some beautiful scenes but he also keeps the drama moving and evolving at a pleasant pace. Plus the acting is alright with Peter Strauss certainly looking at home as a cowboy whilst Mary McDonnell has this soft radiance and warmth going on which makes those romantic moments charming. Then there is a young Yvonne Zima and Michelle Trachtenberg as Chris and Kelly with Trachtenberg bring attitude to the role as the daughter who resents her father and living in his tiny shack on a ranch".
