= List of a Lifetime =

- Official film poster
- Screenplay by: Jessica Landry
- Directed by: Roxy Shih
- Starring: Kelly Hu; Patricia Velasquez; Sylvia Kwan; Jim Klock; Chad Lindberg; Jamie Kaler; Jane Sibbett; Shannen Doherty
- Country of origin: United States
- Original language: English

Production
- Producers: Autumn Federici; Jake Helgren

Original release
- Release: October 10, 2021

List of a Lifetime (alternate title: Breast Cancer Bucket List) is an American drama film directed by Roxy Shih from a screenplay by Jessica Landry. The film stars Kelly Hu, Shannen Doherty (in her final television appearance), Patricia Velasquez, Sylvia Kwan, Jim Klock, Chad Lindberg, Jamie Kaler and Jane Sibbett.

== Plot ==
Follows Brenda Lee, who is diagnosed with triple-negative breast cancer and sets on a journey to find a daughter she gave up for adoption to warn her of the gene mutation that is hereditary.

After three months of building up the courage to meet her daughter for the first time, Brenda's relationships at home and work get more difficult as she hasn't told anyone about the cancer other than her close friend, Meg, who is a social worker that helps Brenda find her daughter in the first place.

When Brenda finally gets the courage to see her daughter, Talia, she shows up unannounced, hoping that she will have a chance to talk to her. At first, Talia is defensive about Brenda just showing up out of nowhere, but when Brenda reveals that she has cancer, Talia lets her in. Talia has so many questions, and wants to know her birthmother, so she plans to meet with her again for dinner the next evening, and they trade phone numbers.

Talia is excited to spend time with Brenda, but keeps the meeting secret from her adoptive parents, and only asks her adoptive mom if she ever knew her birthmother. Talia's mom has her suspicions, but just tells Talia that she only knew Talia's birthmother was very young.

When Talia and Brenda meet for dinner, they begin having conversation and Talia asks if Brenda has ever made a bucket list. Talia helps Brenda come up with a short list on the spot, then Brenda says something that triggers PTSD over her parents who died when she was a child.

Over time, Brenda and Talia spend time together and Talia asks about Brenda's parents. She learns about their tragic death and why Brenda's bucket list included “get back in the water”.

While spending time with Brenda, Talia's adoptive parents arrive at her home and discover the truth. Talia's mom is furious, and Brenda begins to leave, feeling like she was being used when she learned about Talia using this experience with her for an article at her work. Before Brenda can leave, she faints, and wakes up in a hospital.

Eventually, Talia works things out with her adoptive mom and tries to reach out to Brenda. Brenda on the other hand is going back and forth between going through chemo and not. Brenda tells the doctor that she will go through with it, and Talia overhears it while standing outside her room. The next morning, Talia goes to see Brenda and support her, but discovers that Brenda checked herself out of the hospital without getting treatment.

Talia speaks to Meg and tries to talk to Brenda again, but Brenda doesn't want her there. Meg talks to Talia alone and encourages her to keep trying because Brenda doesn't believe that she deserves anything.

Talia ends up taking Brenda to a lake she went to as a child, and Brenda is afraid of the water when Talia tries to coax her to a boat. Brenda finally gains the courage to get in the boat and while on the water relaxes. While in the boat, Talia shows Brenda a paper that is proof that she doesn't have the gene mutation. Brenda realizes that life is worth living for Talia and decides that she will try to fight the cancer after all.

== Cast ==
- Kelly Hu as Brenda Lee
- Sylvia Kwan as Talia Carroll
- Shannen Doherty as Diana Carroll
- Patricia Velásquez as Meg
- Aubrey Cleland as Morgan
- Jane Sibbett as Dr. Elisabeth Boyer
- Jim Klock as Kevin
- Jamie Kaler as Marty Carroll
- Chad Lindberg as Mike
- Ryan Malaty as Tobias
- Derek Yates as Nurse Kent
- Luke Barnett as Franceso

== Production ==
On March 25, 2021, Jim Klock, Chad Lindberg, Jamie Kaler, and Jane Sibbett joined the cast. On August 3, 2021, it was announced that the film was acquired by Lifetime.

The film was shot in Los Angeles, California. It aired on Lifetime on October 10, 2021.
