= Adam Huss =

American actor

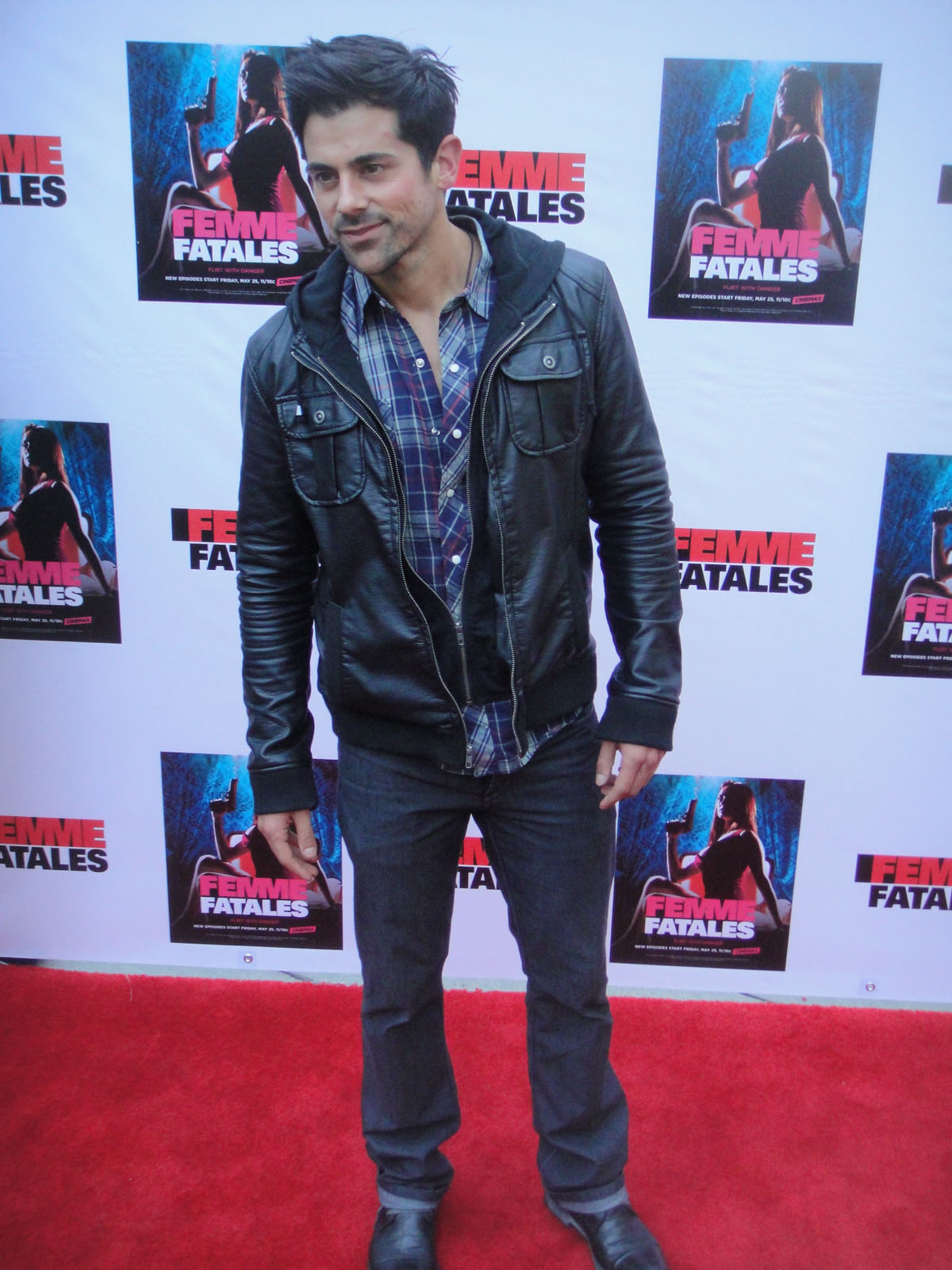
- Born: Adam Thomas Huss; March 1, 1977 (age 49); Long Island, New York, U.S.
- Education: Binghamton University (BA)
- Occupation: Actor
- Years active: 2001–present
- Height: 6 ft 1 in (185 cm)
- Spouse: Adam Bucci (m. 2019)

Adam Thomas Huss (born March 1, 1977) is an American actor. Huss is best known for his role as Josh Kantos in the Starz TV series Power, Lance in the CBS soap opera The Bold and the Beautiful, and Nikolas Cassadine in the ABC soap opera General Hospital. He was also an on-air radio personality "Big City Kid" or "BCK" on Radio Disney affiliate.

== Biography ==
Huss is from Long Island and graduated with a BA in drama from Binghamton University. He married his boyfriend, fellow actor Adam Bucci, on July 25, 2019.

== Filmography ==
=== Film ===
Year	Title	Role	Notes
2002	For Mature Audiences Only	Model	Short
2002	The Sisters Club	Kraig Davis	Short
2004	Demon Slayer	Phillip	Video
2005	Lethal Eviction	Bryan	
2005	Wannabe	Paul Stannard	
2006	Wrestlemaniac	Alfonse	
2007	A Perfect Day	Steve Willis	Short
2007	Sugar Creek	Lawrence	
2007	The Metrosexual	Upscale Waiter	
2008	Daddy's Big Girl	Rick	Short
2008	Resurrection County	Tommy	
2010	Is It Just Me?	Cameron	
2010	Glorious Bitches	Yogi Yogavich	Short
2011	The Arsebook Movie	Waldo Garfield	Short
2011	The Brothers Sinclair	Tony Calypso	
2011	Empty	Nick	Short
2012	Find Me	Neil	
2013	The Cemetery	Tim	
2013	The Wrong Woman	Officer Murphy	TV movie
2014	Foreign Relations	Sam's Boyfriend	Short
2014	Waiting in the Wings: the Musical	Tony	
2014	Such Good People	Officer Cross	
2016	Paradox	Jim	
2016	Cleaners	Link Sacco	Short
2017	Shattered	Rocco	
2017	Misirlou	Charlie	
2017	Dreams I Never Had	Jose	
2018	Witness Unprotected	Det. Matthew Carlton	TV movie
2018	Painkillers	John Clarke	
2018	Fiancé Killer	Brent	
2018	Still Waiting in the Wings	Tony	
2018	Can't Have You	Steven	
2019	The Lurker	Ace Hoffman	
2019	Muna	Tony	
2019	Ernesto's Manifesto	Austin	
2019	From This Day Forward	Michael	Short
2019	Find What You Love...	Aidan	Short
2020	Secrets in the Air	Paul	
2020	Stalked by My Husband's Ex	Ryan Munson	TV movie
2020	The Tribe Murders	Boyd	
2020	Beaus of Holly	Father Tony	
2021	Insight	Mason	
2021	Along Came Wanda	Karl	
2021	All for Her	Rick	
2022	Strangers in the Night	Gabriel	Short
2022	Her Best Friend's Wedding	Matt Barton	TV movie
2022	Another Coffeehouse Chronicles Movie	Simon	
2022	Infamously in Love	Darren Howard	TV movie
2023	Home, Not Alone	Colin	TV movie
2023	Three Dates to Forever	John Reed	TV movie
2023	Let It Kill You	Sgt. Aidan West	Short
2024	Couples Retreat Murder	Joel Rollins	TV movie
2025	A Christmas Murder Mystery	Clark	TV movie

=== Television ===
Year	Title	Role	Notes
2001	All About Us	Devon	Episode: "No Means No"
2002	The Bold and the Beautiful	Lance	Regular Cast
2002	Wednesday 9:30 (8:30 Central)	David Lookalike	Episode: "The Chinese Baby"
2002	Days of Our Lives	Patron	Episode: "Fri Feb 1 2002"
2003	Everwood	Waiter	Episode: "My Funny Valentine"
2003	Monk	Party Guy	Episode: "Mr. Monk Meets the Playboy"
2005	Eve	Wally	Recurring Cast: Season 2
2005	Las Vegas	Rick Jamison	Episode: "For Sail by Owner"
2006	CSI: NY	Kyle Vance	Episode: "Fare Game"
2006	Drake & Josh	Spencer	Episode: "The Wedding"
2006	Passions	Miguel's Impostor	Regular Cast
2007	NCIS	Lt. Michael Arnett	Episode: "Leap of Faith"
2012	NCIS: Los Angeles	Handsome Hipster	Episode: "Crimeleon"
2012	Femme Fatales	Max Bailey	Episode: "Libra"
2013	Ironside	Myron Burton	Episode: "Minor Infractions"
2014–16	Power	Joshua "Josh" Kantos	Main Cast: Season 1–2, Recurring Cast: Season 3
2015	The Bar	Trey	Main Cast
2018	Rage Room	Dave	Episode: "Husband"
2019	Coffee House Chronicles	Simon	Episode: "And Baby Makes..."
2019	The Filth	Raj	Recurring Cast
2020	It Listens from the Radio	Bobby	Episode: "Midnight Swim"
2021–24	General Hospital	Nikolas Cassadine	Regular Cast
2022	Namaste, Bitches	Dr. Sam	Recurring Cast: Season 2
2023	The Bold and the Beautiful	Lance	Episode: "Episode #1.8938"

Preceded by Marcus Coloma	Nikolas Cassadine (role); 2021–24	On hiatus
