= Insight (2021 film) =

- Directed by: Livi Zheng
- Written by: Ken Zheng
- Produced by: Livi Zheng
- Starring: Ken Zheng
- Distributed by: Gravitas Ventures
- Release date: March 12, 2021
- Running time: 80 minutes
- Country: United States
- Language: English

Insight is a 2021 American action film produced and directed by Livi Zheng and starring Ken Zheng, who also wrote the screenplay.

== Plot ==
Jian is a counter-terrorism agent with skills in martial arts and clairvoyance. With reluctant help from detectives of the Los Angeles Police Department, Jian investigates the death of his brother (alleged to have been a suicide) while fighting against a high-tech criminal.

== Cast ==
- Ken Zheng as Jian
- Madeline Zima as Abby
- Sean Patrick Flanery as Wallace Jackson
- John Savage as Frank
- Adam Huss as Mason
- Tony Todd as Carl
- Keith David as Captain Duke

== Release ==
In February 2021, Gravitas Ventures acquired North American distribution rights to the film, which was released on March 12, 2021.

== Reception ==
Tara McNamara of Common Sense Media awarded the film one star out of five.

Christian Gallichio of Film Threat rated the film a 1 out of 10 and wrote, "There’s truly little redeeming about Insight, as the film leaves only a faint lingering impression — mainly indifference."
