= Philip Hedley =

British theatre director (1938–2024)

Philip Hedley CBE
- Born: Philip David Hedley; 20 April 1938; Manchester, England
- Died: 5 January 2024 (aged 85); England
- Occupation: Theatre director
- Website: philiphedley.com

Philip David Hedley, CBE (10 April 1938 – 5 January 2024) was a British theatre director.

== Education ==
Philip Hedley was born in Manchester, England, on 10 April 1938, and his growing interest in drama was the consistent element throughout his schooling in Manchester, London, Melbourne and Sydney. He was praised as an actor at the University of Sydney and when he returned to England in time for the Swinging Sixties, he thought it would be an actor's-life-for-him. Seeing a production directed by the innovative director Joan Littlewood revolutionised his thinking about theatre. In the early 1960s, Hedley became a founding student of East 15 Acting School devoted to Joan Littlewood's rehearsal methods, which in turn were based on the acting theories of Stanislavsky and the movement theories of Laban.

After Hedley graduated in 1963, he went on to put Littlewood's methods into practice in British theatres in the regions, in London's West End, and in Australia, Canada and the Sudan.

== Career ==
On graduating, Hedley became an actor/ASM for a year at a repertory theatre, the Liverpool Playhouse, but that experience convinced him he was a director, not an actor. So, he became a teacher at East 15 Acting School to give himself experience directing plays, for three years. He went on to direct plays for LAMDA, for the Royal Court's young people's programme and for the Watford Palace Theatre.

After successfully producing Sheridan's The Rivals at the Lincoln Theatre Royal in 1968, Hedley was offered the post of Artistic Director. During his tenure there, he directed twenty-five plays and produced twenty more. He relished deliberately casting parts against type for the actors to extend their range.

Before his move to London, Hedley also ran the Midlands Arts Theatre Company in Birmingham for two years and emphasised young people's work. While there, Hedley directed new plays by Henry Livings and David Cregan and he did two more of their plays at the Midland Arts Centre.

Hedley was then artistic director of Theatre Royal Stratford East from 1979 to 2004. Prior to that, he had been assistant to Joan Littlewood, and Gerry Raffles who was the administrator and owner, at Stratford East.

Hedley would also accept guest productions in eight different regional English theatres, plus two productions a-piece in Vancouver and Sydney. Typical of the reviews he would get: The National Health by Peter Nichols with Australia's leading company of actors at The Old Tote in Sydney: "There is over all an assured and relaxed ensemble playing of the kind one was beginning to despair of in the Old Tote Theatre Company, and a feel of common purpose behind the work which gives the whole play a sense of conviction." (Katherine Brisbane, The Australian). "The actors look like a team at last; the performances are so far ahead of what most of these actors have done this season that one feels like cheering." (Greg Curran, The Sunday Australian)

Upon leaving the Theatre Royal Stratford East in 2004, Philip was named Director Emeritus.

Year	Role	Location
1963–64	Actor / Assistant Stage Manager	Liverpool Playhouse Theatre
1964–66	Teacher / Director / Assistant Producer	East 15 Acting School, London
1966–67	Teacher / Director Freelance Director	LAMDA, London English Regional Theatre (Lincoln, Manchester, Watford) and Royal Court Theatre London
1968–70	Artistic Director	Lincoln Theatre Royal, England
1970–72	Artistic Director	Midlands Arts Theatre Company, Birmingham, England
1972–74	Associate Director to Joan Littlewood	Theatre Royal Stratford East, London
1974–79	Freelance Director	English Regional Theatre: Leicester, Watford, Exeter, Windsor, Sheffield and Stoke London: West End, Royal Court Theatre and RADA Overseas: Australia, Sudan and Canada BBC TV
1979–2004	Artistic Director	Theatre Royal Stratford East, London

=== Rescue of the Royal ===
Hedley's role in theatre changed radically in late 1979, owing to a crisis in the management of the Theatre Royal Stratford East.

Over a five-year period, three artistic directors had failed to find a formula to make that theatre work after Littlewood's departure, and by autumn 1979 the Arts Council was threatening to withdraw its subsidy if Hedley could not, within two years, justify its continuation.

He took up the challenge, and from a standing start, sought out shows to connect with local, East End audiences. There were pantomimes and Variety Nights, sometimes with star names. Events ranged from local school shows to West Indian poets, to the North East London Police Choir. There was a new musical actually set in the Theatre Royal itself, with music by Ray Davies of The Kinks. There was Hamlet with a celebrated director, Lindsay Anderson, and there was a political farce about Margaret Thatcher's rise to power, which received the excellent publicity of provoking "questions in the House".

What really raised hopes the Royal would survive was the first play by Nell Dunn, called Steaming (1981). Set in the East End, it ran for more than three years in the West End. The Guardian commented: "It seems the Theatre Royal Stratford East has finally found a management with both a taste for the popular and welcome audacity."

It became certain the Theatre Royal would keep its Arts Council grant when, a few days before the decision deadline, the Arts Council's Director of Drama was quoted in The Times as saying: "Philip has taken a very bold line, and he does seem to have found a dramatic vocabulary appropriate to the area."

=== Pioneering black and Asian work ===
During Hedley's tenure the Theatre Royal commissioned more black and Asian plays and employed more black and Asian actors than any other British theatre at that time and held three short courses for black and Asian would-be directors.

In the 1990 Prudential Awards for the Arts, the Drama award was won by the Theatre Royal with the following judgement: “Under the present leadership of Philip Hedley, in a time of restriction and entrenchment in the arts the Theatre Royal Stratford East have increased their programme, developed an enthusiastic multi-racial audience of every class and age group, and most successfully promoted new writing with particular emphasis on populist, Afro-Asian, and young people's work. This is an extraordinary achievement for a theatre of such substantial size but with restricted resources."

=== Epics and risks ===
Over the 25 years as director of the Theatre Royal, Hedley was active and passionate in organising campaigns against any cuts in arts funding mooted by the government or the Arts Council. He urged theatres not to cut back on adventurous programming and would occasionally stage an expensive show if he felt there were aesthetic and/or social reasons justifying the taking of the risk. For example, Hedley staged the British premiere of Federico Garcia Lorca's The Public, directed and designed by Ultz, which defied Section 28 of the Local Government Act 1988, which banned the promotion of homosexuality.

=== Championing breakthrough musical ===
During Hedley's final seven years as Director, the Theatre Royal was to be thoroughly renovated and an Arts Centre was to be built next door. The initial plan was for this to take 15 months, but this stretched to nearly four years. During which time the Royal did small-scale local tours and a short season at the Greenwich Theatre.

In 1999, Philip Hedley was instrumental in organising the Theatre Royal Stratford East's Musical Theatre Initiative, which aimed to develop and eventually produce new musicals. Led by lecturers from Tisch School of the Arts in New York City, the workshops explored the craft of musical theatre writing and collaboration.

This period of time also saw a development of new musicals based on the rap and hip-hop music and in Hedley's final two years as artistic director the Theatre Royal staged two new musicals. The first in 2003 was a rap and hip-hop version of a traditional Broadway show by Rodgers and Hart, The Boys from Syracuse, which was based on the Shakespeare play, The Comedy of Errors. All the seats were removed from the stalls to enable young people to dance down there, with bouncers in view as in a dance hall. Da Boyz was hailed in the press, most significantly by The New York Times, marvelling at how a little theatre in London was given the rights to modernise the show in a way no American theatre had been allowed to do.

In Hedley's last year at the Theatre Royal he intended the final show he would present would be a break-through musical, called The Big Life. It used Shakespeare's Love's Labour's Lost as the basis for a show about the Windrush generation coming to England. It had been in development for three years, inspired by the Musical Theatre Project. It was a great success and Hedley became associate producer on its transfer to the West End in the following year. The Big Life was the first black West End musical set in Britain and Clint Dyer was the first black director of a West End musical.

== Death ==
Hedley died on 5 January 2024, at the age of 85.

== Awards and honours ==
1991	ABSA (Association of Business Sponsorship) / The Daily Telegraph Award for Achievement in Sponsorship
1997	The Theatre Royal was named as a role model case study by the Commission for Racial Equality
2004	Arts Council England / Theatre Managers' Association: Eclipse Award for advances against institutional racism in theatre
2005	CBE, for services to drama Egyptian Government Award for Services to International Experimental Theatre and Multiculturalism Time Out Director's Award for Outstanding Contribution to Theatre Rose Bruford College: Honorary Fellow Director Emeritus: Theatre Royal Stratford East
2011	University of East London: Honorary Doctorate
