= Brush with Danger =

2014 American action film

- Directed by: Livi Zheng
- Written by: Ken Zheng
- Produced by: Zane Thomas; Livi Zheng
- Starring: Ken Zheng; Livi Zheng; Norman Newkirk; Nikita Breznikov; Michael Blend; Stephanie Hilbert
- Cinematography: Ryan Purcell
- Edited by: John Rosenberg
- Music by: Garry Schyman
- Production companies: Sun and Moon Films
- Release dates: September 19, 2014 (US); November 26, 2015 (Indonesia)
- Running time: 90 minutes
- Country: United States
- Language: English

Brush with Danger is an American action film produced and directed by Livi Zheng. The film stars Ken Zheng, Livi Zheng, Norman Newkirk, Nikita Breznikov, Michael Blend, and Stephanie Hilbert. The film was written, produced, and directed by a brother-sister duo from Indonesia, Livi Zheng and Ken Zheng, who after pursuing martial arts and filmmaking separately, came together to create this martial arts action thriller. The film was released in theaters in the United States on September 19, 2014.

== Synopsis ==
Siblings Ken and Alice become entangled with Seattle criminals who want to exploit their talent as martial artists.

== Cast ==
- Ken Zheng as Ken Qiang
- Livi Zheng as Alice Qiang
- Norman Newkirk as Justus Sullivan
- Nikita Breznikov as Nick Thompson
- Michael Blend as Marcus Gilani
- Stephanie Hilbert as Elizabeth St. Clouds

== Production ==
Brush with Danger was shot in Seattle, Washington and Los Angeles, California.

== Release ==
The film received a limited release in the United States on September 19, 2014, and in Indonesia on November 26, 2015.

== Reception ==
The film was critically panned and holds a 20% score on Review aggregator website Rotten Tomatoes. On Metacritic, it holds a score of 22 based on four reviews.

Anita Gates of The New York Times wrote "One of the many strange things about this genre-confused film is that Alice and Ken, who are fictional siblings portrayed by real ones, never say where they’re from. Instead we get numerous references to Asia in general and the occasional sentence beginning, 'In my country.'" Gates added that "the script consists of singularly unoriginal dialogue" and called the screenplay "colloquial".

Giving the film 1.5 out of 5 stars, Marc Savlov of The Austin Chronicle wrote that the film "is ultimately hobbled by a paucity of credible acting" and that while "the Zhengs might be people to keep an eye on", the film "isn’t the most promising of starts". Simon Abrams of The Village Voice criticized the action scenes as "poorly choreographed" and that they "do nothing to extenuate the film's offensive characterizations".

Michael Rechtshaffen of the Los Angeles Times praised the cinematography and said that while the storytelling was not sophisticated, the film was "undauntedly upbeat".
