= Madeline Zima =

American actress (born 1985)

- Zima at the Cinequest Film Festival in 2026
- Born: September 16, 1985 (age 41); New Haven, Connecticut, U.S.
- Occupation: Actress
- Years active: 1992–present
- Children: 1
- Relatives: Vanessa Zima (sister); Yvonne Zima (sister)

Madeline Zima (born September 16, 1985) is an American actress. She portrayed Grace Sheffield on the CBS sitcom The Nanny (1993–1999), Mia Lewis on the Showtime comedy drama series Californication (2007–2011), and Gretchen Berg on the NBC series Heroes (2006–2010).

== Early life ==
Zima was born in New Haven, Connecticut, on September 16, 1985, the daughter of Marie and Dennis Zima. Her surname means "winter" in Polish and comes from her maternal grandfather, who was of Polish descent. She has two younger sisters, Vanessa and Yvonne, both of whom are also actresses.

== Career ==
Madeline Zima began her career when she was two years old with an appearance in a television commercial for Downy fabric softener. In 1993, as a child actress, she landed a main role as Grace Sheffield on the television show The Nanny, which lasted six seasons and ran until 1999.

In 2007, Zima played the main role of Mia Lewis in the first two seasons of the Showtime comedy-drama Californication alongside David Duchovny, appearing as a guest star in seasons 3 & 4 through to 2011. In promotion of the fictional book her character wrote, Fucking & Punching, Zima starred in several Californication webisodes featured on YouTube. Zima has become known for her work in films including The Hand That Rocks the Cradle, A Cinderella Story, Dimples, Looking for Sunday, Once in a Very Blue Moon, Legacy, and The Collector.

In 2009, Zima joined the cast of Heroes as Gretchen Berg, Claire Bennet's quirky bisexual roommate and tentative love interest. She appeared as a guest star on several television shows, including Law & Order, JAG, and Touched by an Angel. She also guest starred in an episode of The Vampire Diaries, and in two episodes of the 2017 Twin Peaks: The Return. In 2012, she was cast in a co-starring role in the ABC drama pilot Gilded Lilys, but the series was not picked up by ABC. Zima starred in The Blondes (2019), a scripted podcast series, with her sister Yvonne.

In 2020, she appeared in HBO's Perry Mason and in 2021, in an episode of NCIS: Hawaiʻi. In 2022, she landed a recurring role as Casey Brinke / Space Case in season 4 of Doom Patrol. In 2023, Zima joined Megan Fox in S.K. Dale's 2024 sci-fi thriller Subservience. In 2026, she played a guest role in the CBS medical-mystery series Watson. She also appeared in Episode 4 Season 1 of the ABC Series High Potential as the mother of two missing girls.

== Filmography ==
=== Film ===
Year	Title	Role	Notes
1992	The Hand That Rocks the Cradle	Emma Bartel	
1993	Mr. Nanny	Kate Mason	
1997	'Til There Was You	Gwen Moss (Age 12)	
1998	The Rose Sisters	N/A	
1998	Second Chances	Melinda Judd	
1999	The Secret Path	Jo-Ann Foley (Age 14)	CBS TV Movie; Also titled Chasing Secrets
2004	A Cinderella Story	Brianna	
2006	Looking for Sunday	Trisha	
2008	Legacy	Zoey Martin	Direct-to-video film; also known as Pretty Little Devils
2008	Dimples	Frances	
2008	Streak	Stella	
2009	The Collector	Jill Chase	
2010	Trance	Jessica	
2010	First Dates	Kelly	Direct-to-video film
2010	My Own Love Song	Billie	
2011	The Family Tree	Mitzy Steinbacher	
2011	A Monster in Paris	Maud	Voice role (English dub)
2012	Breaking the Girls	Alex Layton	
2012	Crazy Kind of Love	Annie	
2012	Crazy Eyes	Rebecca	
2012	Lake Effects	Lily	
2014	#Stuck	Holly	
2014	From A to B	Samantha	
2015	Weepah Way for Now	Lauren	
2018	Painkillers	Chloe Clarke	
2019	VHYes	Maiden #2	
2019	Bombshell	Edie	
2020	The Morning After	Holly	
2021	Bliss	Doris	
2021	Insight	Abby	
2024	Subservience	Maggie	
2025	Love Is the Monster	Ana	

=== Television ===
Year	Title	Role	Notes
1993	Law & Order	Samantha Silver	Episode: "Extended Family"
1993–1999	The Nanny	Grace Sheffield	Main role
1996	JAG	Cathy Gold	Episode: "Sightings"
1997	Touched by an Angel	Alexandra "Ally"	Episode: "Children of the Night"
1999	The Secret Path	Jo Ann Foley (age 14)	Television film; also known as Chasing Secrets
1999	Chicken Soup for the Soul	Katie	Episode: "Starlight, Star Bright"
1999	Lethal Vows	Danielle Farris	Television film
2000	The Sandy Bottom Orchestra	Rachel Green	Television film
2001	The Nightmare Room	Alexis Hall	2 episodes
2001	King of the Hill	Susan Clemmons	Voice role; 2 episodes
2001	Gilmore Girls	Lisa	Episode: "Like Mother, Like Daughter"
2003	7th Heaven	Alice Miller	Episode: "Go Ask Alice"
2003	Lucy	Teen Lucille Ball	Television film
2004	Strong Medicine	Pam	Episode: "Like Cures Like"
2006	3 lbs	Cassie Mack	Episode: "Lost for Words"
2007	Ghost Whisperer	Maddy Strom	Episode: "Mean Ghost"
2007	Grey's Anatomy	Marissa	Episode: "Forever Young"
2007–2011	Californication	Mia Lewis	Main role (seasons 1–2), 28 episodes
2009–2010	Heroes	Gretchen Berg	Recurring role, 11 episodes
2010	My Boys	Ashley	Episode: "Be a Man!"
2011	Royal Pains	Toby Thompson	Episode: "Me First"
2012	The Vampire Diaries	Charlotte	Episode: "We'll Always Have Bourbon Street"
2013	Gilded Lilys	Abigail	Unsold television pilot
2013–2014	Betas	Jordan Alexis	Recurring role, 6 episodes
2015	Grimm	Emily Troyer	Episode: "Maiden Quest"
2015	Agent X	Brenda Pelton / Molly	Episode: "Truth, Lies and Consequences"
2016	I Am Watching You	Nora	Television film
2017	Twin Peaks	Tracey Barberato	Episodes: "Part 1", "Part 2"
2019	You	Rachel	Episode: "Farewell, My Bunny"
2020	Good Girls	Lila	Episodes: "Nana", "Incentive"
2020	Perry Mason	Velma Fuller	Episode: "Chapter One"
2021	NCIS: Hawaii	Abby Nelson	Episode: "Gaijin"
2021	Hacks	Cat	Episode: "Falling"
2022–2023	Doom Patrol	Casey Brinke / Space Case	5 episodes
2024	High Potential	Mia Ashford	Episode: "Survival Mode"
2026	Watson	Marnie Prisuta	Episode: "The Tunnel Under the Elms"

=== Directing credits ===
Year	Title	Notes
2018	Warm Human Magic	18 minute short

=== Writing credits ===
Year	Title	Notes
2018	Warm Human Magic	18 minute short

=== Music videos ===
Year	Title	Artist
2011	"Sails"	Hooray for Earth

== Awards and nominations ==
Zima was nominated three times for a YoungStar Award, in 1995, 1997 and 1999, all for Best Performance by a Young Actress in a Comedy TV Series for The Nanny.

She was nominated 13 times for a Young Artist Award:

- 1993 – Best Young Actress Under Ten in a Motion Picture for The Hand That Rocks the Cradle
- 1994 – Best Youth Actress Leading Role in a Motion Picture Comedy and for Outstanding Youth Ensemble in a Television Series, shared with Benjamin Salisbury and Nicholle Tom, both for The Nanny
- 1995 – Best Performance by a Youth Actress as a TV Guest Star for Law & Order, and Best Performance by a Youth Ensemble in a Television Series shared with Nicholle Tom and Benjamin Salisbury, Best Performance by an Actress Under Ten in a Motion Picture and Best Performance by an Actress Under Ten in a TV Series, all of them for The Nanny
- 1996 – Best Performance by a Young Actress in a TV Comedy Series for The Nanny
- 1998 – Best Performance in a TV Comedy Series by a Supporting Young Actress for The Nanny
- 2001 – Best Performance in a TV Movie (Drama) by a Leading Young Actress for The Sandy Bottom Orchestra
