= Designing Women season 3 =

Designing Women
- Season 3
- DVD cover
- Starring: Dixie Carter; Annie Potts; Delta Burke; Jean Smart; Meshach Taylor
- No. of episodes: 22

Release
- Original network: CBS
- Original release: November 14, 1988 – May 22, 1989

Season chronology
- ← Previous; Season 2 Next → Season 4

The third season of Designing Women premiered on CBS on November 14, 1988, and concluded on May 22, 1989. The season consisted of 22 episodes. Created by Linda Bloodworth-Thomason, the series was produced by Bloodworth/Thomason Mozark Productions in association with Columbia Pictures Television.

== Cast ==
=== Main cast ===
- Dixie Carter as Julia Sugarbaker
- Annie Potts as Mary Jo Shively
- Delta Burke as Suzanne Sugarbaker
- Jean Smart as Charlene Frazier-Stillfield
- Meshach Taylor as Anthony Bouvier

=== Recurring cast ===
- Douglas Barr as Colonel Bill Stillfield
- Hal Holbrook as Reese Watson
- Richard Gilliland as J.D. Shackleford
- Alice Ghostley as Bernice Clifton
- Priscilla Weems as Claudia Shively

=== Guest cast ===
- Rika Hofmann as Ursula
- Robert Hy Gorman as Quinton Shively
- Jason Bernard as Wilson Brickett
- Meg Wyllie as Dorothy
- Shavar Ross as Tyrone
- Ginna Carter as Camilla Sugarbaker
- Mary Dixie Carter as Jennifer Sugarbaker
- Tom Sullivan as Danny Hedgecock
- Gregory Wurster as Odell Frazier
- Sandy Kenyon as Bud Frazier
- Ken Letner as Earl Sloan
- Leanne Griffin as Sissy Sloan
- Patrick Day as Ben
- Benay Venuta as Ellen Stillfield
- Anne Haney as Aunt Phoebe Stillfield
- William Bell Sullivan as Ken Rayburn
- Barry Corbin as Bud Frazier
- Ronnie Claire Edwards as Ione Frazier
- Bobbie Ferguson as Monette Marlin
- Phyllis Cowan as Darlene Frazier
- Justin Burnette as Harold Thomas Frazier
- Deborah Benson as Harlene Frazier
- Fabiana Udenio as Juanita
- Ian Patrick Williams as DeWitt Chiles
- Wendie Jo Sperber as Estelle Rinehart
- Millicent Collingsworth as Gail Forrester
- Buddy Farmer as D.B. LeBoot
- Danny Thomason as Reggie Mac Dawson
- Macon McCalman as Paul Webster
- Rosalind Ingledew as Terry Wilder

== Episodes ==
No. overall	No. in season	Title	Directed by	Written by	Original release date	U.S. viewers (millions)	Rating/share (households)
45	1	"Reservations for 12, Plus Ursula"	David Trainer	Linda Bloodworth-Thomason	November 14, 1988	19.6	15.3/23
A voluptuous maid disrupts a romantic Thanksgiving at the beach.
46	2	"The Candidate"	David Trainer	Linda Bloodworth-Thomason	November 21, 1988	16.4	12.4/18
Julia's opinionated nature seems to work against her in a run for a seat on the local board of commissioners.
47	3	"E.P., Phone Home"	David Trainer	Linda Bloodworth-Thomason	November 28, 1988	21.9	15.8/23
Charlene has VIP tickets to Graceland and talks the girls and Anthony into going there with her for the weekend. While there, Julia is touched by a trucker's story of how Elvis Presley influenced his life.
48	4	"Getting Married and Eating Dirt"	David Trainer	Linda Bloodworth-Thomason	December 5, 1988	17.4	12.8/19
Bernice Clifton asks the women of Sugarbaker's to be her wedding attendants when she receives a marriage proposal from a man who has an odd habit of proposing to every woman he meets.
49	5	"Big Haas and Little Falsie"	Harry Thomason	Linda Bloodworth-Thomason	December 12, 1988	21.1	15.5/23
Mary Jo contemplates getting breast implants after receiving an inheritance from her uncle with the stipulation she must spend the money on something frivolous.
50	6	"Hard Hats and Lovers"	David Trainer	Linda Bloodworth-Thomason	December 19, 1988	21.2	15.1/23
Suzanne convinces Charlene that Bill will have a wandering eye if he doesn't date more before they get serious. The ladies get revenge on city construction workers across the street by telling their wives and mothers about the sexist comments they've been making.
51	7	"Curtains"	David Trainer	Pam Norris	January 2, 1989	28.3	20.2/31
Striking laborers from a textile factory protest outside Sugarbaker's. The Sugarbaker women desperately need curtains finished for a hotel job, so they decide to go to the factory and finish them on their own. After working for a while, they realize what terrible conditions the laborers had.
52	8	"The Wilderness Experience"	David Trainer	Linda Bloodworth-Thomason	January 9, 1989	23.8	17.4/26
Bernice buys herself and the women a trip to a wilderness survival course where their leadership skills are tested.
53	9	"Tyrone"	David Trainer	Linda Bloodworth-Thomason	January 16, 1989	19.0	13.4/20
Anthony acts as a mentor to a troubled youth named Tyrone. The boy appears congenial and begins helping Anthony with unloading goods at Sugarbaker's, but soon betrays Anthony and the women's trust by robbing a store. Anthony visits Tyrone at Juvenile hall and shares a story about his own past.
54	10	"Mr. Bailey"	David Trainer	Pam Norris	January 23, 1989	23.1	16.4/24
A recently deceased client leaves millions of dollars as well as Sugarbaker's prepaid designing services to her cat, Mr. Bailey, and the women must find a way to honor the woman's wishes. Her home is filled with odd possessions, and the ladies assume the woman was crazy, but a delivery man enlightens them about the belongings and Mr. Bailey's famous past.
55	11	"The Naked Truth"	Iris Dugow	Linda Bloodworth-Thomason	February 13, 1989	20.7	15.1/23
Julia sends Mary Jo, Charlene, and Anthony to visit a new client, but they are shocked to find that, unbeknownst to Julia, the client lives in a nudist camp. Julia and Suzanne's two nieces visit them at work and stay over at their homes, and they discover that the nieces have nearly identically personalities to Julia and Suzanne.
56	12	"The Junies"	David Trainer	Pam Norris	February 20, 1989	19.1	13.4/20
Charlene, trying to help out a friend, becomes a part-time saleswoman for "Lady June" cleaning products. Soon, she doesn't need or want the job anymore, but other workers pressure her into staying. Julia decides the job is similar to a cult and decides to rescue Charlene. Meanwhile, Anthony's junior college is trying to get students more involved with pride events like homecoming, and Anthony is strangely nominated as his school's homecoming queen.
57	13	"One Sees, the Other Doesn't"	Ron Troutman	Pam Norris	February 27, 1989	20.1	14.6/22
Suzanne returns from a week-long stay at a spa where she spent $2,000 and is upset when the other women say she looks the same. She proclaims that any man would appreciate her radiance. The next man who enters Sugarbaker's & Associates is a client who Suzanne doesn't know is blind, and she tries to show off for him. The other women introduce him as Danny Hedgecock, which he amusingly follows with "...Blind Guy". Suzanne is relieved to find out she's not losing her touch. She's soon surprised to discover that the man — a rich, intelligent humanitarian — is attracted to her. She and the other women have a hard time accepting that anyone is attracted to her personality. Mary Jo struggles to figure out how to design the man's house, since she can't show him samples and sketches.
58	14	"Odell"	Dwayne Hickman	Cassandra Clark & Debbie Pearl	March 6, 1989	19.3	14.2/21
Charlene's brother Odell visits with important news: he's marrying the daughter of a longtime rival of their family. Soon, the fathers of both teens show up at Sugarbaker's and begin fighting. Bernice asks Anthony to be her partner in a dance contest.
59	15	"Full Moon"	David Trainer	Linda Bloodworth-Thomason	March 13, 1989	22.7	16.2/25
The women share their most embarrassing moments after Julia accidentally moons the audience at a fashion show. Mary Jo is suddenly afraid that her 16-year-old daughter Claudia might have sex with her boyfriend and decides to spy on her. Suzanne asks Anthony to stay over at her house for the night because she's afraid of her neighbors who keep threatening to shoot her pet pig.
60	16	"Ms. Meal Ticket"	Hal Holbrook	Linda Bloodworth-Thomason	March 20, 1989	20.5	15.1/22
Just as J.D. moves in with Mary Jo, he loses his job. Enjoying himself while waiting to find work, Mary Jo becomes afraid that J.D. will be dependent on her and never work again, which sparks a fight and causes J.D. to leave. A psychic with whom Charlene consults ends up talking to Mary Jo and helping her come to grips with her real fears about the situation.
61	17	"The Engagement"	David Trainer	Pam Norris	March 27, 1989	19.3	14.6/23
When Charlene, now happily engaged, goes to meet her in-laws, she's terrified that she won't be good enough for Bill's mother. She regularly calls Julia on the phone to question her about etiquette. After breaking up with J.D., Mary Jo gets asked out by a younger man and ends up at a keg party.
62	18	"Come on and Marry Me, Bill"	David Trainer	Linda Bloodworth-Thomason	April 10, 1989	21.8	16.3/25
The ladies throw a party with all of Charlene's relatives to celebrate her wedding which will take place the next day. Bill heads to his stag party where he reluctantly watches a Latin exotic dancer and ends up handcuffed to her. The dancer, unfortunately, has forgotten to bring the key to the handcuffs, and soon Charlene becomes worried about what is going on when Bill doesn't answer the phone.
63	19	"The Women of Atlanta"	Harry Thomason	Linda Bloodworth-Thomason	May 1, 1989	21.6	15.5/24
Charlene and Mary Jo meet a photographer who wants to take pictures of them, along with Julia and Suzanne, for a magazine article focusing on the women of Atlanta and their occupations. Julia distrusts him from the beginning and after he has the women change into sexier outfits and strike suggestive poses, she becomes furious and kicks him out.
64	20	"Stand and Fight"	David Trainer	Pam Norris	May 8, 1989	19.7	14.3/21
A shaken Mary Jo comes to work and recounts to Anthony and the women how she was mugged. After she describes how she was too frightened to fight back against her attacker, Anthony gives her the name of a self-defense class at the community center where he sometimes volunteers. The four women all attend the class, but Mary Jo still struggles to fight. Later, alone in a parking garage, she's confronted by a stranger who touches her shoulder and she suddenly remembers what she was taught and yells at the man to back off. She proudly tells Julia of her victory, and a few minutes later, the man she fought off enters Sugarbaker's. It turns out he's actually D.B. LeBoof, a new client, who had recognized Mary Jo from a magazine picture. Fortunately, LeBoof recognizes his gaffe in approaching a woman to whom he is a stranger and notes he was impressed by Mary Jo's reaction, adding that she had "terrified" him.
65	21	"The Last Humorously-Dressed Bellboy in America"	David Trainer	Linda Bloodworth-Thomason	May 15, 1989	17.2	12.7/19
The women discover that Reggie Mac Dawson, the accountant who absconded with Suzanne's life savings, is working as bellboy/pianist in a hotel. Suzanne confronts him, demanding he return her money, but Reggie Mac instead spends what's left of the money by purchasing a circus for Suzanne.
66	22	"Julia Drives Over the First Amendment"	David Trainer	Pam Norris	May 22, 1989	18.6	13.3/21
A local newsstand begins displaying a large, smutty poster of a woman to advertise its pornographic magazines. Julia tires of seeing it on her way to work each morning and becomes so angry that she drives her car through it. The newsstand owner keeps putting sexy posters up, and Julia continues to drive through them. A lawsuit ensues, pitting Julia up against a very determined magazine publisher.

== DVD release ==
The third season was released on DVD by Shout! Factory on March 22, 2010.
