= Designing Women season 1 =

Designing Women
- Season 1
- DVD cover
- Starring: Dixie Carter; Annie Potts; Delta Burke; Jean Smart
- No. of episodes: 22

Release
- Original network: CBS
- Original release: September 29, 1986 – May 11, 1987

Season chronology
- Next → Season 2

The first season of Designing Women premiered on CBS on September 29, 1986, and concluded on May 11, 1987. The season consisted of 22 episodes. Created by Linda Bloodworth-Thomason, the series was produced by Bloodworth/Thomason Mozark Productions in association with Columbia Pictures Television.

The series centers on the lives of four women and one man working together at an interior design firm in Atlanta, Georgia called Sugarbaker & Associates. It originally starred Dixie Carter as Julia Sugarbaker, president of the design firm; Delta Burke as Suzanne Sugarbaker, Julia's ex-beauty queen sister and the design firm's silent partner; Annie Potts as head designer, Mary Jo Shively; and Jean Smart as office manager, Charlene Frazier.

== Broadcast history ==
When the show debuted on CBS' Monday-night lineup in 1986 (9:30 pm, EST) it garnered respectable ratings; however, CBS moved the show several times to other time slots. After dismal ratings on Sunday night and Thursday night time slots, CBS placed it on hiatus and was ready to cancel the show, but a viewer campaign saved the show and returned it to its original Monday night slot. The show's ratings solidified, and it regularly landed in the top 20 rankings.

== Cast ==
=== Main cast ===
- Dixie Carter as Julia Sugarbaker
- Annie Potts as Mary Jo Shively
- Delta Burke as Suzanne Sugarbaker
- Jean Smart as Charlene Frazier

=== Recurring cast ===
- Scott Bakula as Ted Shively
- Priscilla Weems as Claudia Shively
- Brian Lando as Quentin Shively
- George Newbern as Payne McIlroy
- Richard Gilliland as J.D. Shackleford
- Meshach Taylor as Anthony Bouvier
- Alice Ghostley as Bernice Clifton
- Hal Holbrook as Reese Watson

=== Guest cast ===
- Pamela Bowen as Marjorie Lee Winick
- Walter Olkewicz as Mason Dodd
- David Winn as Dane
- Natalia Nogulich as Primrose Horton
- Arlen Dean Snyder as Ray Don Simpson
- Louise Latham as Perky Sugarbaker
- Bobbie Ferguson as Monette Marlin
- Lisa Peluso as Shannon Gibbs
- Michael Ross as Gaylon King
- Ronnie Claire Edwards as Ione Frazier
- Andre Rosey Brown as Wendell Mack
- Justin Burnette as Harold Thomas Frazier
- Connie Chew as Li Sing
- Geoffrey Lewis as Dr. Davis Jackson
- Gregg Henry as Jack Dent
- Ted Leplat as Hence Winchester

== Episodes ==
No. overall	No. in season	Title	Directed by	Written by	Original release date	Rating/share (households)
1	1	"Designing Women"	Ellen Falcon	Linda Bloodworth-Thomason	September 29, 1986	18.8/28
Pilot: Suzanne visits a new gynecologist who is Mary Jo's ex-husband Ted, and an uproar is created when she announces she is dating him. (In this episode, Mary Jo is called just "Jo.")
2	2	"The Beauty Contest"	Jack Shea	Linda Bloodworth-Thomason	October 6, 1986	16.9/25
Charlene sponsors Mary Jo's daughter Claudia in the Miss Pre-Teen Atlanta contest, and despite her depression over her own upcoming 30th birthday, Suzanne coaches Claudia on how to walk and smile. Meanwhile, Julia takes the current Miss Georgia World to task after overhearing her snide comments about Suzanne. (Also known as "The Night the Lights Went Out in Georgia".)
3	3	"A Big Affair"	Jack Shea	Linda Bloodworth-Thomason	October 20, 1986	18.3/26
Suzanne's small dinner party, planned to impress an important client, goes awry before it begins when she arranges a date between a very large man and a reluctant Charlene.
4	4	"Julia's Son"	Jack Shea	Linda Bloodworth-Thomason	October 27, 1986	18.3/26
Julia's nineteen-year-old son Payne is bringing his girlfriend home from college for a visit, and Julia wants everything to be perfect. Payne then presents his girl, Primmy, who is tall, attractive, and forty-one years old. This leads to a conflict clash between the two women, until Primmy tries to make Payne choose between her and his mother, which infuriates him.
5	5	"Mary Jo's First Date"	Jack Shea	Cheryl Gard	November 3, 1986	17.1/25
Julia hopes an IRS auditor doesn't remember where he met her before, while Mary Jo reluctantly re-enters the dating circuit for the first time since breaking up with Ted.
6	6	"Design House"	Jack Shea	Joan Brooker & Nancy Eddo	November 17, 1986	15.0/22
Suzanne is tired of her image as a bimbo at Sugarbaker's, so Julia assigns her to do the decorating of their next project. Unfortunately, the house burns to the ground while Suzanne is working on it.
7	7	"Perky's Visit"	Jack Shea	Linda Bloodworth-Thomason	November 24, 1986	17.5/26
Perky Sugarbaker, Julia and Suzanne's mother, in her only appearance on Designing Women, brings her friend Bernice Clifton to have Thanksgiving dinner with the women of Sugarbaker's and their ex-con handyman, Anthony.
8	8	"I Do, I Don't"	Jack Shea	Emily Marshall	December 4, 1986	11.7/18
After a perfect evening (and some champagne), Julia and her beau, attorney Reese Watson, decide to get married on a lark. The next morning, they both regret the decision.
9	9	"The IT Men"	Jack Shea	Emily Marshall	December 11, 1986	10.9/16
When Charlene's boyfriend Mason takes a job in Japan, she finds herself attracted to another man, who happens to be married to a Sugarbaker & Associates client.
10	10	"The Slumber Party"	Jack Shea	Linda Bloodworth-Thomason	December 18, 1986	9.5/15
Suzanne tells Charlene, Julia, and Mary Jo that when she tried to fire her maid Consuela, the maid put a voodoo death curse on her. Meanwhile, Mary Jo asks the women to help with her daughter Claudia's slumber party.
11	11	"New Year's Daze"	David Steinberg	Trish Vrandenburg	January 1, 1987	16.8/25
On New Year's Eve, the women of Sugarbaker's are ready to have a fun night on the town. Charlene keeps the identity of her date a secret until a news flash reports that he is the subject of a massive manhunt.
12	12	"Old Spouses Never Die"	Barnet Kellman	Linda Bloodworth-Thomason	February 1, 1987	19.2/28
13	13	"Old Spouses Never Die"	Barnet Kellman	Linda Bloodworth-Thomason	February 1, 1987	19.2/28
Mary Jo is ruminating about her ex-husband's interference in her life and J.D.'s constant interference coming from his ex-wife, Janet. The women distrust Charlene's doctor's cavalier attitude toward the lump he found in her breast. Julia discovers that a friend of hers saw the same doctor, and angrily confronts him. Dedication: In loving memory of Pauline Thomason and Claudia Bloodworth
14	14	"Monette"	Barnet Kellman	Linda Bloodworth-Thomason	February 8, 1987	14.5/21
Monette, an old schoolmate of Charlene's, buys Chadwick mansion and asks Sugarbaker's to redecorate. At first, the women are excited about the lucrative job, but the assignment is not what they expected. (Monette would make appearances in Season 4.)
15	15	"And Justice for Paul"	Jack Shea	Trish Vrandenburg	February 15, 1987	13.3/19
Suzanne has a client who wants period furniture on a very tight budget. The women of Sugarbaker's, with the help of Charlene's new boyfriend, find antique furniture at bargain prices but later discover that it was stolen furniture.
16	16	"Reese's Friend"	Arlene Sanford	Linda Bloodworth-Thomason	February 22, 1987	17.4/25
Julia and Suzanne are preoccupied with a disagreement over the theme for the annual country club fund-raiser until Reese appears with a gorgeous young woman on his arm, (Lisa Peluso) explaining that she is a new attorney in his law firm.
17	17	"Nashville Bound"	Harry Thomason	Linda Bloodworth-Thomason	March 16, 1987	19.3/29
Charlene gets exciting news that her entire family, including all ten of her brothers and sisters, will be visiting her at the same time, but it is overshadowed when a Nashville producer discovers her.
18	18	"Oh, Suzannah"	Matthew Diamond	Linda Bloodworth-Thomason	March 23, 1987	17.7/27
While in Reese's office to sign legal papers, Suzanne suddenly volunteers to foster a Vietnamese boat child, Li Sing, for four weeks, at which point she'll go to her adoptive home. Suzanne becomes attached to Li Sing quickly and has a hard time letting go.
19	19	"Mary Jo's Dad Dates Charlene"	Jack Shea	Linda Bloodworth-Thomason	April 6, 1987	15.7/23
Mary Jo becomes protective when her divorced father comes to Atlanta for a visit and dances cheek-to-cheek with Charlene.
20	20	"Seams from a Marriage"	Jack Shea	E. Jack Kaplan	April 13, 1987	15.4/24
When Anthony saunters into the shop wearing an enormous cowboy hat, he is followed by a breathless Mary Jo, who has obviously been out all night as she is wearing the same clothes she had on when she left the day before. This leaves everyone clamoring for an explanation. It seems their appointment with Sugarbaker's newest client turned into an all-night bash, complete with Cajun buffet and country-western band.
21	21	"Grand Slam, Thank You Ma'am"	Barnet Kellman	Linda Bloodworth-Thomason	May 4, 1987	16.0/25
Suzanne is desperate for revenge after her baseball player ex-husband, Jack Dent, writes in his autobiography that he had a lot of groupie action during his career.
22	22	"Bachelor Suite"	Jack Shea	Linda Bloodworth-Thomason	May 11, 1987	14.7/23
Mary Jo finds herself the target of sexual harassment when she takes a decorating job with a wealthy client, Hence Winchester.

== DVD release ==
The first season was released on DVD by Shout! Factory on May 26, 2009. Special features include the 2006 reunion bringing together the original cast mates and creator of the show, as well as a seven-page booklet written by Linda Bloodworth-Thomason introducing the series.
