= Designing Women season 2 =

Designing Women
- Season 2
- DVD cover
- Starring: Dixie Carter; Annie Potts; Delta Burke; Jean Smart; Co-Starring; Meshach Taylor
- No. of episodes: 22

Release
- Original network: CBS
- Original release: September 14, 1987 – March 28, 1988

Season chronology
- ← Previous; Season 1 Next → Season 3

The second season of Designing Women premiered on CBS on September 14, 1987, and concluded on March 28, 1988. The season consisted of 22 episodes. Created by Linda Bloodworth-Thomason, the series was produced by Bloodworth/Thomason Mozark Productions in association with Columbia Pictures Television.

== Cast ==
=== Main cast ===
- Dixie Carter as Julia Sugarbaker
- Annie Potts as Mary Jo Shively
- Delta Burke as Suzanne Sugarbaker
- Jean Smart as Charlene Frazier
- Co-starring Meshach Taylor as Anthony Bouvier

=== Recurring cast ===
- Scott Bakula as Ted Shively
- Priscilla Weems as Claudia Shively
- Brian Lando as Quinton Shively
- Alice Ghostley as Bernice Clifton
- Gerald McRaney as Dash Goff
- Hal Holbrook as Reese Watson
- Douglas Barr as Colonel Bill Stillfield
- George Newbern as Payne McIlroy
- Richard Gilliland as J.D. Shackleford

=== Guest cast ===
- Jonathan Banks as Eldon Ashcroft IV
- Terry Burns as Kyle Wellborn
- Eileen Seeley as Tammy
- Tony Goldwyn as Kendall Dobbs
- Camilla Carr as Imogene Salinger
- Elliott Reid as Lamar Tyson
- Marc Silver as Howard
- M. C. Gainey as T. Tommy Reed
- Lewis Grizzard as Clayton Sugarbaker
- John Dewey-Carter as Matthew Jarvis
- Keith Williams as Kyle Jarvis
- Arlen Dean Snyder as Ray Don Simpson
- Ivan Bonar as Wilmont Oliver
- Patrick Tovatt as Reverend Nunn

== Episodes ==
No. overall	No. in season	Title	Directed by	Written by	Original release date	Rating/share (households)
23	1	"101 Ways to Decorate a Gas Station"	Harry Thomason	Linda Bloodworth-Thomason	September 14, 1987	15.6/24
A grungy gas-station owner wins free interior decoration from Sugarbaker & Associates. Charlene consults a psychic about her future.
24	2	"Ted Remarries"	Harry Thomason	Linda Bloodworth-Thomason	September 21, 1987	17.6/28
Mary Jo has a hard time having her children being spoiled by her ex-husband's new wife.
25	3	"Anthony Jr."	David Trainer	Linda Bloodworth-Thomason	September 28, 1987	15.8/24
Anthony goes overboard trying to impress his girlfriend's wealthy parents until an uninvited dinner guest informs him he is the father of her child.
26	4	"Killing All the Right People"	Harry Thomason	Linda Bloodworth-Thomason	October 5, 1987	18.6/29
Kendall Dobbs, a friend of the women of Sugarbaker's and fellow decorator, announces to the women that he is dying of AIDS and wants them to design his funeral. The news gets Mary Jo fired up at a PTA debate on birth control.
27	5	"Half an Air Bubble Off"	Harry Thomason	Linda Bloodworth-Thomason	October 19, 1987	15.4/23
When Sugarbaker's acquires an eccentric client with bizarre decorating requests, the women play matchmakers by pairing him with their off-beat friend, Bernice Clifton.
28	6	"Dash Goff, the Writer"	David Trainer	Linda Bloodworth-Thomason	October 26, 1987	16.6/26
Suzanne's novelist husband visits, and she discovers he has writer's block and is contemplating suicide.
29	7	"Heart Attacks"	Matthew Diamond	Linda Bloodworth-Thomason	November 9, 1987	15.2/22
Julia's boyfriend Reese suffers a heart attack while arm-wrestling a law-school classmate.
30	8	"Cruising"	Harry Thomason	Linda Bloodworth-Thomason	November 16, 1987	14.3/21
When the Sugarbaker ladies go on a cruise, Mary Jo and Suzanne are pursued by the same man.
31	9	"I'll Be Seeing You"	David Trainer	Linda Bloodworth-Thomason	November 23, 1987	17.1/26
A handsome army colonel appears at Sugarbakers and Charlene is convinced her friends have arranged his appearance as a surprise answer to her birthday wish for a soldier. Later that night, Charlene dreams the ladies and Anthony are back in World War II and the USO. Douglas Barr makes his first appearance as Colonel Bill Stillfield.
32	10	"Stranded"	David Trainer	Linda Bloodworth-Thomason	December 7, 1987	15.6/24
While Charlene, Julia, and Mary Jo get the flu on a trip to St. Louis, a snowstorm forces Suzanne and Anthony to share a motel room in Tennessee.
33	11	"Howard the Date"	Harry Thomason	Linda Bloodworth-Thomason	December 14, 1987	16.6/24
Out of pity, the women take a nerdy acquaintance of Mary Jo's out on a group date when he proves dateless for their high school reunion. Things take a turn, however, when Howard, formerly the nerd, develops an obnoxious ego as he brags about how he handles his "four women."
34	12	"I'll Be Home for Christmas"	Harry Thomason	Linda Bloodworth-Thomason	December 21, 1987	14.4/22
Charlene and Anthony portray Santa and one of his Elves, to outsmart Mary Jo's disbelieving son on Christmas Eve. Meanwhile Suzanne hires a department store Santa to surprise them.
35	13	"Great Expectations"	David Trainer	Linda Bloodworth-Thomason	January 4, 1988	15.8/23
Anthony is dismayed when an old prison cellmate arrives at Sugarbaker's to talk with him about a business proposition.
36	14	"Second Time Around"	David Trainer	Linda Bloodworth-Thomason	January 11, 1988	16.8/25
Charlene withdraws after being dumped by her boyfriend, Bill, who is still grieving the loss of his first wife. Julia then shares with Bill her own personal experience about losing her husband and tries to convince him that being with Charlene is okay.
37	15	"Oh, Brother"	David Trainer	Linda Bloodworth-Thomason	January 18, 1988	17.4/26
Julia and Suzanne disagree on how to handle the arrival of their half-brother Clayton, a recently discharged mental patient with hopes of becoming a stand-up comedian.
38	16	"There's Some Black People Coming to Dinner"	Jack Shea	Linda Bloodworth-Thomason	January 25, 1988	13.2/20
Mary Jo gives Claudia permission to go to a school dance with a black boy, contrary to his father's wishes.
39	17	"The Return of Ray Don"	David Trainer	Linda Bloodworth-Thomason	February 1, 1988	16.3/25
Suzanne is broke after her accountant Reggie Mac Dawson absconds with her entire life savings and faces stiff fines for back taxes, so after trying to charm Ray Don at the IRS, she sells off her possessions and considers marriage to wealthy elderly man Wilmont Oliver.
40	18	"High Rollers"	Harry Thomason	Linda Bloodworth-Thomason	February 8, 1988	14.1/20
After Charlene unwittingly puts a bug in Suzanne's ear by relating the success story of Fred Smith, founder of Federal Express, Suzanne flits off to Atlantic City with Charlene and Anthony in hopes of winning a bundle to pay off debts by employing Anthony's gambling expertise.
41	19	"The Incredibly Elite Bona Fide Blue-Blood Beaumont Driving Club"	Matthew Diamond	Linda Bloodworth-Thomason	February 15, 1988	15.3/22
Suzanne and Julia clash over a posh club's offer of membership when Julia discovers discrimination in the club's bylaws.
42	20	"How Great Thou Art"	Harry Thomason	Linda Bloodworth-Thomason	February 22, 1988	13.7/20
Julia is chosen to sing at a Baptist convention, but she worries about a high note in the arrangement of "How Great Thou Art." Charlene is upset when she discovers her minister is against allowing women to preach.
43	21	"Ted-Bare"	Hal Holbrook	Linda Bloodworth-Thomason	March 21, 1988	14.5/22
On the brink of marrying a young woman, Ted begins to appreciate ex-wife Mary Jo's maturity, but his sudden attentiveness makes everyone else suspicious.
44	22	"Reservations for Eight"	Hal Holbrook	Linda Bloodworth-Thomason	March 28, 1988	14.7/22
A romantic ski weekend turns into a battle of the sexes when an avalanche sidelines the Sugarbaker ladies and their boyfriends.

== DVD release ==
The second season was released on DVD by Shout! Factory on August 11, 2009.
