= Designing Women season 5 =

Designing Women
- Season 5
- DVD cover
- Starring: Dixie Carter; Annie Potts; Delta Burke; Jean Smart; Meshach Taylor
- No. of episodes: 24

Release
- Original network: CBS
- Original release: September 17, 1990 – May 13, 1991

Season chronology
- ← Previous; Season 4 Next → Season 6

The fifth season of Designing Women premiered on CBS on September 17, 1990, and concluded on May 13, 1991. The season consisted of 24 episodes. Created by Linda Bloodworth-Thomason, the series was produced by Bloodworth/Thomason Mozark Productions in association with Columbia Pictures Television.

== Cast ==
=== Main cast ===
- Dixie Carter as Julia Sugarbaker
- Annie Potts as Mary Jo Shively
- Delta Burke as Suzanne Sugarbaker
- Jean Smart as Charlene Frazier-Stillfield
- Meshach Taylor as Anthony Bouvier

=== Recurring cast ===
- Alice Ghostley as Bernice Clifton
- Michael Goldfinger as Rusty
- Douglas Barr as Colonel Bill Stillfield
- Priscilla Weems as Claudia Shively
- Richard Gilliland as J.D. Shackleford
- Lexi Randall as Randa Oliver
- Brian Lando as Quinton Shively

=== Guest cast ===
- Mary Ann Mobley as Karen Delaporte
- Kristoffer Tabori as Daryl Morton
- Bill Cobbs as Henry/Charlie
- Charles Levin as Marvin Sheinberg
- Meg Wyllie as Miss Eulalie Crown
- Sandahl Bergman as Davida Daniels
- Richard Sanders as Dr. Elliot Newhouse
- Peter Crook as Bill
- Collin Bernsen as Donald Banks
- Dennis Burkley as Billy Boy Swine
- Patricia Ayame Thomson as May
- Darrell Larson as Garret Rossler
- Dennis Burkley as Buford

== Episodes ==
No. overall	No. in season	Title	Directed by	Written by	Original release date	U.S. viewers (millions)
95	1	"A Blast from the Past"	David Trainer	Pam Norris	September 17, 1990	28.4
Sugarbaker's is beset by tourists when the building's Civil War foundation puts it on the Tour of Historical Homes; Mary Jo opens her heart to an old friend eager to make good on a marriage pact they once entered into.
96	2	"Papa Was a Rolling Stone"	David Trainer	Cassandra Clark & Debbie Pearl	September 24, 1990	25.4
During Anthony's 30th birthday, he ends up meeting the father he never knew.
97	3	"Working Mother"	David Trainer	Pam Norris	October 1, 1990	25.7
Resentment builds between Charlene and Mary Jo when Charlene wants to take a year off to look after her baby. The decorators cater to the whims of a rich, insufferable 10-year-old client as Mary Jo and Charlene ponder the joys and pitfalls of working mothers.
98	4	"Miss Trial"	David Trainer	Dee LaDuke & Mark Alton Brown	October 15, 1990	22.6
Julia may have to miss her chance to have dinner with former President Carter when she is sequestered while on jury duty. Suzanne, Anthony and Charlene win a shopping spree at a record store.
99	5	"The Bachelor Auction"	David Trainer	Pam Norris	October 22, 1990	28.0
When organizational confusion leads to Suzanne winning a date with Anthony in a bachelor charity auction, the two reluctantly try to make the best of a very awkward situation.
100	6	"Charlene Buys a House"	David Trainer	Pam Norris	October 29, 1990	26.8
Charlene buys a house that is haunted by the former owner; she hires Sugarbaker's to make some decorating improvements, and the ladies have to stay the night in the haunted house.
101	7	"Old Rebels and Young Models"	Iris Dugow	Dee LaDuke & Mark Alton Brown	November 5, 1990	26.1
Charlene auditions her baby for a modeling job.
102	8	"Nowhere to Run To"	David Trainer	Cassandra Clark & Debbie Pearl	November 12, 1990	24.1
Mary Jo takes up jogging and invites Julia to come along. Soon Julia goes overboard, only focusing on running, so she will get in shape for her annual physical.
103	9	"A Class Act"	Dwayne Hickman	Cassandra Clark & Debbie Pearl	November 19, 1990	25.1
Anthony becomes a full partner in Sugarbaker's and this creates some adjustment issues for Suzanne. Charlene begins to take classes part-time, and has to fend off an amorous psychology professor.
104	10	"Keep the Homes Fires Burning"	David Trainer	Dee LaDuke & Mark Alton Brown	November 26, 1990	24.3
Charlene misses her husband Bill who's been sent to the Persian Gulf. She dreams back in time when the United States enters World War II following the attack on Pearl Harbor on December 7, 1941.
105	11	"My Daughter, Myself"	David Trainer	Pam Norris	December 10, 1990	21.7
Mary Jo forbids her nearly 18-year-old daughter to date a 34-year-old man; she then decides to date him herself. Julia crashes the men's restroom at a football stadium after waiting in line forever for the women's restroom.
106	12	"And Now, Here's Bernice"	David Trainer	Dee LaDuke & Mark Alton Brown	December 17, 1990	22.1
Bernice gets a local Public-access television cable TV show and invites Julia, Mary Jo, Charlene and Anthony as her guests, but presents them as proprietors of a call girl service, rather than a decorating firm. After Mary Jo has her heart broken, she decides that she needs to warn women about men who break women's hearts, and uses Bernice's show to out them.
107	13	"Pearls of Wisdom"	David Trainer	Pam Norris	January 7, 1991	29.9
Mary Jo switches her knock-off pearls for Suzanne's real ones as a joke, but then loses them in an all-you-can-eat salad bar. Suzanne subs on the local news as a lifestyle reporter. A recurring dream about Julia upsets Anthony.
108	14	"High Noon in a Laundry Room"	David Trainer	Dee LaDuke & Mark Alton Brown	January 14, 1991	26.1
After Anthony's laundry room is taken over by a group of thugs, he's afraid that confronting by the thugs might spark a big brawl. The ladies arrive in the laundry room just in time to come to his rescue.
109	15	"How Long Has This Been Going On?"	David Trainer	Cassandra Clark & Debbie Pearl	January 28, 1991	22.2
Everyone at Sugarbaker's is shocked when they discover Julia has been secretly performing at a local night club (under the name of Gizelle). Anthony wants to date a beautiful woman who works at the local bookstore, then realizes the woman is rude, loud, and crass.
110	16	"The Emperor's New Nose"	David Trainer	Thom Bray & Michael Ross	February 4, 1991	26.4
Bernice gets a botched face lift, liposuction work, and a (bad) nose job that makes her look like a pig. The girls can't stop complimenting her on it, while secretly laughing at it. While shopping with Charlene, Bernice actually gets mistaken for Miss Piggy by a little boy and his mother. Bernice finally decides to get reconstructive surgery. Meanwhile, Suzanne buys a Cadillac after driving one as a loaner while her Mercedes is in the shop.
111	17	"Maybe Baby"	David Trainer	Pam Norris	February 11, 1991	24.4
Mary Jo tells J.D. that she wants a baby and wants him to father it, rather than go to the sperm bank. Meanwhile, Suzanne decides she's going to smoke to lose weight.
112	18	"This Is Art?"	Roberta Sherry Scelza	Steven Roth & Deanne Roth	February 25, 1991	24.0
After Julia's purse accidentally gets mistaken for a piece of conceptual art and sold at a local gallery, she gains a reputation as an artist. Suzanne accidentally glues her mouth shut while repairing a broken fingernail and is unable to speak, and Mary Jo attempts to fix a ding she accidentally put in Charlene's car when she backed into it.
113	19	"Blame It on New Orleans"	David Trainer	Dee LaDuke & Mark Alton Brown	March 4, 1991	24.2
The ladies attend a New Orleans convention, where Mary Jo oversteps her rules of decorum with a man who turns out to be married.
114	20	"I'll See You in Court"	David Trainer	Cassandra Clark & Debbie Pearl	March 18, 1991	22.6
Mary Jo runs across the man who mugged her the year before, but faces horrendous judicial red tape to bring him to trial. Suzanne takes Bernice and her friends to the mall under threat of Julia's wrath and then begins doing it on a regular basis.
115	21	"The Big Circle"	David Trainer	Pam Norris	April 8, 1991	24.6
After Reese dies, Suzanne helps a despondent Julia plan a getaway cruise — only to have a former client, young Randa Oliver, arrive on her doorstep needing a place to stay.
116	22	"Friends and Husbands"	David Trainer	Cassandra Clark & Debbie Pearl	April 29, 1991	17.2
Charlene quits the children's-book project with Mary Jo upon Bill's return from the Middle East. Bernice takes videos hoping to get them on television. Julia fails her driver's test.
117	23	"Fore!"	David Trainer	Pam Norris	May 6, 1991	21.5
Anthony is invited to be the first black in the previously all-white Beaumont Country Club, which concerns Julia because she's worried that it's only because they want to get on the PGA tour.
118	24	"The Pride of Sugarbakers"	Iris Dugow	Thom Bray & Michael A. Ross	May 13, 1991	21.7
Mary Jo and Julia demonstrate different coaching styles when Sugarbaker's sponsors a Little League team on which Quint and Randa both play. Suzanne's new car seems to be a magnet for foul balls. Note: This episode marks Delta Burke's final appearance on the series.

== DVD release ==
The fifth season was released on DVD by Shout! Factory on December 6, 2011.
