= Designing Women season 4 =

Designing Women
- Season 4
- DVD cover
- Starring: Dixie Carter; Annie Potts; Delta Burke; Jean Smart; Meshach Taylor
- No. of episodes: 28

Release
- Original network: CBS
- Original release: September 18, 1989 – May 21, 1990

Season chronology
- ← Previous; Season 3 Next → Season 5

The fourth season of Designing Women premiered on CBS on September 18, 1989, and concluded on May 21, 1990. The season consisted of 28 episodes. Created by Linda Bloodworth-Thomason, the series was produced by Bloodworth/Thomason Mozark Productions in association with Columbia Pictures Television.

== Broadcast history ==
The season originally aired Mondays at 9:30-10:00 pm (EST) on CBS. From 1989 through 1992, Designing Women and Murphy Brown aired back-to-back, creating a very successful hour-long block for CBS, as both shows were thought to appeal to similar demographics. The show was a top 30 hit for three consecutive seasons (1989–92), making it the most successful at the time. The high ratings also helped CBS's ratings overall, which had struggled around the late 1980s.

== Cast ==
=== Main cast ===
- Dixie Carter as Julia Sugarbaker
- Annie Potts as Mary Jo Shively
- Delta Burke as Suzanne Sugarbaker
- Jean Smart as Charlene Frazier-Stillfield
- Meshach Taylor as Anthony Bouvier

=== Recurring cast ===
- Alice Ghostley as Bernice Clifton
- Douglas Barr as Colonel Bill Stillfield
- Hal Holbrook as Reese Watson
- Richard Gilliland as J.D. Shackleford
- Olivia Brown as Vanessa Hargraves
- Michael Goldfinger as Rusty
- George Newbern as Payne McIlroy

=== Guest cast ===
- Ann Dusenberry as Belva McPherson
- Ray Buktenica as Donald Stillman
- Bobbie Ferguson as Monette Marlin
- Dub Taylor as Daddy Jones
- S.A. Griffin as Nub Jones
- Michael Morrison as Rupert Jones
- Mariann Alda as Lita Ford
- Kim Zimmer as Mavis Madling
- Michael Cutt as Dan Madling
- Leslie Ackerman as Phyllis McGuire
- Ann Hearn as Amy Betz
- Henry Cho as Sam
- Dolly Parton as herself
- Beah Richards as Miss. Minnie Bell Ward
- Leann Hunley as Gaby Langford
- Lloyd Bochner as Ansel Pollard
- Constance Towers as Louise Pollard
- Michael Ross as Stan
- Rex Young as Scott
- Jocelyn Seagrave as Sylvie
- Richard Sanders as Elmer Peace
- Karen Kopins as Eugenia Weeks
- Bruce Davison as Reverend Gene Chapman

== Episodes ==
No. overall	No. in season	Title	Directed by	Written by	Original release date	U.S. viewers (millions)
67	1	"The Proxy Pig and Great Pretenders"	Harry Thomason	Linda Bloodworth-Thomason	September 18, 1989	20.4
Suzanne, desperate to mother something or someone since her beloved pet pig Noel ran away, ends up nursing Anthony back to health after he injures his back carrying her marble-top table down the stairs and his health insurance lapses. Belva McPherson, a rich, snobby acquaintance of Mary Jo's comes to town and, to impress her, Mary Jo claims that a mansion she's decorating is her own home.
68	2	"One Night with You"	David Trainer	Linda Bloodworth-Thomason	September 25, 1989	20.3
Julia discovers that Donald Stillman, a terminally-ill man who was a classmate of hers, has a last wish: to spend one night with her. She can't find his picture in her yearbook and has no memory of him at all. She dresses up, against Suzanne's advice, and meets with him at a restaurant, with no intention of going any further than dinner. Donald turns out to be a charming — albeit geeky — astronomer, and Julia finds herself attracted to him. She admits that she's already in a relationship, and they simply spend the night dancing. Suzanne, Mary Jo, Charlene and Anthony decide to spy on Donald and Julia.
69	3	"There She Is"	David Trainer	Pam Norris	October 2, 1989	17.5
While preparing for Charlene's baby shower, Charlene, Mary Jo and Julia are surprised by a visit from the Director of Pageants for Miss Georgia. While putting past voting information onto computers, an error was discovered and it turns out that Suzanne actually came in second place, not first. The women try to find a delicate way to break the news to Suzanne that she must relinquish the crown she won 15 years earlier, but in the end Suzanne believes everything will work out to her advantage. Her prediction comes true when, in the ceremony where the crown is set to change hands, the true Miss Georgia reveals that she slept with one of the judges to get a better score, and Suzanne keeps her crown.
70	4	"Nightmare from Hee Haw"	David Trainer	Linda Bloodworth-Thomason	October 16, 1989	19.9
The Sugarbaker women and their mates take a canoe trip in the Georgia backwoods, but while unwinding in a bar/diner later that night, some large countrymen get it set in their minds that they want to dance with the women and will do whatever it takes to make that happen.
71	5	"The Girlfriend"	David Trainer	Pam Norris	October 23, 1989	18.6
Anthony introduces his new girlfriend, Lita, to the women and they immediately dislike her. The women are desperate to get a remodeling job done when they must fire their handyman for slacking off. Anthony offers his services, and hires some of his ex-convict friends to help him. Anthony's eager to prove himself, but his friends cut corners with much of the material and Anthony would rather tell the truth to the women than do a shoddy job.
72	6	"The Rowdy Girls"	David Trainer	Linda Bloodworth-Thomason	October 30, 1989	18.5
While she is helping the Sugarbaker women choreograph a Supremes lip-synch routine, Charlene inadvertently discovers that her favorite cousin is a victim of domestic violence. Guest starring Kim Zimmer as Mavis Madling
73	7	"Bernice's Sanity Hearing"	David Trainer	Linda Bloodworth-Thomason	November 13, 1989	18.4
Bernice's money grubbing niece tries to have her declared incompetent because of her sometimes bizarre behavior. The women must testify for her.
74	8	"Julia Gets Her Head Stuck in a Fence"	David Trainer	Pam Norris	November 20, 1989	21.1
Sugarbaker's is hired to decorate the Governor's mansion for its annual ball. Anthony receives an invitation to the ball, but Suzanne is dismayed to learn that she has not been invited. After decorating the "Abbott banister" at the mansion, Julia is persuaded by the others to do something silly and winds up with her head stuck in the banister, which cannot be cut due to its historical significance.
75	9	"Julia and Suzanne's Big Adventure"	Dwayne Hickman	Pam Norris	November 27, 1989	18.6
Julia and Suzanne go to Japan to visit their mother. Upon arrival, they are robbed of their money and luggage, and they learn that their mother had to abruptly leave for Paris to visit a sick friend, and are thus stranded in the Tokyo airport for the entire weekend. Anthony and Mary Jo, meanwhile, call in a large number of votes to a television poll, only to learn later that each call costs two dollars, and that they owe an enormous phone bill.
76	10	"Manhunt"	David Trainer	Pam Norris	December 4, 1989	21.0
Desperately single Mary Jo, worried that her busy schedule will condemn her to a life alone, accepts coaching from Suzanne as she plans a weekend manhunt.
77	11	"They Shoot Fat Women, Don't They?"	Harry Thomason	Linda Bloodworth-Thomason	December 11, 1989	24.1
Anthony gets Julia and the others involved in a two-day world hunger event to end its starvation in Ethiopia. Meanwhile, Suzanne, in denial of her weight gain since high school, is preparing to attend her 15th class reunion.
78	12	"You Got to Have Friends"	David Trainer	Pam Norris	December 18, 1989	23.6
Mary Jo takes a second job at a fast food establishment when Ted's child support payment is late. Anthony, Bernice and Julia come face-to-face with her while they are in line at "Burger Guy", and reluctantly agree to help Mary Jo work the "lunch shift".
79	13	"The First Day of the Last Decade of the Entire Twentieth Century"	Harry Thomason	Linda Bloodworth-Thomason	January 1, 1990	31.0
80	14	"The First Day of the Last Decade of the Entire Twentieth Century"	Harry Thomason	Linda Bloodworth-Thomason	January 1, 1990	31.0
Suzanne and Mary Jo rush Charlene to the hospital when she goes into labor on New Year's Eve and with a desire to deliver the first New Year's baby. Dolly Parton plays Charlene's "guardian movie star," who comes to her in a dream with news of her baby's birth, Suzanne wants a Charlene's baby at midnight so she (Suzanne) can win a contest on the radio. Anthony has a crazy New Year's date and Bernice goes for an unexpected ambulance ride.
81	15	"The Mistress"	Iris Dugow	Linda Bloodworth-Thomason	January 8, 1990	26.6
The ladies are hired by a wealthy stockbroker, Ansel Pollard, to decorate a house for a client's wife as well as a condo for his mistress. Though Suzanne is sure that strait-laced Julia and Mary Jo will never go through with the assignment, the firm accepts the job. However, things ultimately turn out to be not what they seem.
82	16	"The Fur Flies"	Hal Holbrook	Pam Norris	January 15, 1990	24.5
The fur flies at a fashion show where Suzanne's after-dinner mink causes a riot among animal-rights activists. Charlene brings Olivia to Sugarbaker's while she looks for a nanny.
83	17	"Oh, What a Feeling"	David Trainer	Paul Clay	January 29, 1990	22.4
Their delivery van breaks down stranding Anthony with a nasty client in the middle of the freeway and in a rain storm. The ladies need to get a van to finish the delivery by midnight so they decide to buy a new one. They end up dealing with a sexist used car salesman.
84	18	"Anthony and Vanessa"	David Trainer	Linda Bloodworth-Thomason	February 5, 1990	23.9
Hired for a temporary job at Sugarbaker's, Anthony's friend Vanessa learns the tricks of the trade from Suzanne and then goes to work reeling in Anthony. Mary Jo and Charlene try to figure out why Rusty the electrician wears his pants so low. While Suzanne is watching Unsolved Mysteries, she starts to think that the baby's nurse is as a con-artist and counterfeiter.
85	19	"Payne Grows Up"	David Trainer	Pam Norris	February 19, 1990	20.2
Julia is not pleased to learn that Payne is graduating early in order to marry his pregnant girlfriend. Upset at becoming a grandmother so soon, Julia gets tipsy at the wedding, then wakes up mortified — and scantily clad — the next day with Payne's frat house roommate, with little recollection of the previous night's events.
86	20	"Tornado Watch"	William Crain	Linda Bloodworth-Thomason	February 26, 1990	22.9
Julia, Suzanne, Mary-Jo, Anthony and Charlene must endure being stranded for the duration of a tornado watch with Bernice, a hillbilly, a sexually dysfunctional client and Anthony's girlfriend.
87	21	"Tough Enough"	David Trainer	Pam Norris	March 12, 1990	21.6
A redecorating job for a sports account is right down Sugarbaker's alley, especially when it pits the women against a macho, overconfident designer from an all-male firm. They are determined to steal one of their prized clients, Cherokee Lanes Bowling Alley, in retaliation for the men having stolen one of theirs. They discover that they must pose as regular bowlers to get the account.
88	22	"It's a Wonderful Life"	David Trainer	Thom Bray and Michael Ross	March 19, 1990	20.1
Charlene feels unattractive since having the baby and suspects that Bill is having an affair. When she confronts him, they have a huge argument. To bring back the romance in their relationship, Julia, Mary Jo, and Anthony decide to re-create where Bill and Charlene spent their first date.
89	23	"Suzanne Goes Looking for a Friend"	David Trainer	Dee LaDuke & Mark Alton Brown	April 9, 1990	22.9
A former beauty queen and current television weather forecaster announces her "coming out," causing a confused Suzanne to think she means she's the world's oldest debutante and to accept Eugenia's invitation to join her at a television industry dinner.
90	24	"Foreign Affairs"	David Trainer	Cheryl Bascom	April 30, 1990	23.7
Suzanne's maid Consuela is threatened with deportation. Anthony pretends to be her, even wearing a dress, to help her.
91	25	"Have Faith"	David Trainer	Paul Clay and Pam Norris	May 7, 1990	19.6
Mary Jo attends church with Julia and Charlene and ends up dating the minister. Anthony gets his clothing stolen at a baseball game.
92	26	"Their Finest Hour"	Ellen Falcon, Harry Thomason and David Trainer	Linda Bloodworth-Thomason	May 9, 1990	16.5
An hour-long clip show of highlights from the previous seasons, including a razor-tongued Julia standing up for Suzanne against an insolent beauty pageant contestant, Julia defending Bernice's eccentricities, Mary Jo commenting on men and bra sizes, Charlene wondering about everything from killer bees to the personal habits of other women, Suzanne displaying a series of wacky dresses, and Anthony being plagued by a variety of indignities.
93	27	"Anthony's Graduation"	David Trainer	Linda Bloodworth-Thomason	May 14, 1990	23.5
As if Anthony weren't under enough stress over his impending graduation and a visit from his grandmother, he is shot in the leg by Suzanne when she mistakes him for an intruder.
94	28	"La Place sans Souci"	Iris Dugow	Linda Bloodworth-Thomason	May 21, 1990	25.1
Julia, Mary Jo, Suzanne, Charlene, and Anthony go to a posh spa. After Suzanne and Charlene are put on the weight loss program and Julia and Mary Jo are put on the weight gain program, tempers flare. They end up getting kicked out of the resort after flinging mud at each other from the thermal mud bath.

== DVD release ==
The fourth season was released on DVD by Shout! Factory on September 14, 2010.
