= List of Designing Women episodes =

The following is an episode list for the CBS sitcom Designing Women. The series began airing on September 29, 1986 and the final episode aired on May 24, 1993. During its seven-year run, 163 Designing Women episodes were produced. In addition, a Designing Women reunion show featuring the cast members aired in 2003.

== Series overview ==
At present, all seven seasons have been released on DVD by Shout! Factory.

| Season | Episodes | Originally released | | Rank | Rating | Viewers (millions) |
| Season | Episodes | First released | Last released | Rank | Rating | Viewers (millions) |
|---|---|---|---|---|---|---|
| 1 | 22 | September 29, 1986 | May 11, 1987 | 33 | 16.1 | —N/a |
| 2 | 22 | September 14, 1987 | March 28, 1988 | 34 | 15.5 | —N/a |
| 3 | 22 | November 14, 1988 | May 22, 1989 | 33 | 15.0 | 20.6 |
| 4 | 28 | September 18, 1989 | May 21, 1990 | 22 | 15.3 | 21.7 |
| 5 | 24 | September 17, 1990 | May 13, 1991 | 10 | 16.5 | 24.4 |
| 6 | 23 | September 16, 1991 | May 4, 1992 | 6 | 17.3 | 24.6 |
| 7 | 22 | September 25, 1992 | May 24, 1993 | 67 | 9.9 | 14.0 |
| R | 1 | July 28, 2003 | | —N/a | —N/a | TBA |

== Episodes ==
=== Season 1 (1986–87) ===
| No. overall | No. in season | Title | Directed by | Written by | Original release date | Rating/share (households) |
|---|---|---|---|---|---|---|
| 1 | 1 | "Designing Women" | Ellen Falcon | Linda Bloodworth-Thomason | September 29, 1986 | 18.8/28 |
| 2 | 2 | "The Beauty Contest" | Jack Shea | Linda Bloodworth-Thomason | October 6, 1986 | 16.9/25 |
| 3 | 3 | "A Big Affair" | Jack Shea | Linda Bloodworth-Thomason | October 20, 1986 | 18.3/26 |
| 4 | 4 | "Julia's Son" | Jack Shea | Linda Bloodworth-Thomason | October 27, 1986 | 18.3/26 |
| 5 | 5 | "Mary Jo's First Date" | Jack Shea | Cheryl Gard | November 3, 1986 | 17.1/25 |
| 6 | 6 | "Design House" | Jack Shea | Joan Brooker & Nancy Eddo | November 17, 1986 | 15.0/22 |
| 7 | 7 | "Perky's Visit" | Jack Shea | Linda Bloodworth-Thomason | November 24, 1986 | 17.5/26 |
| 8 | 8 | "I Do, I Don't" | Jack Shea | Emily Marshall | December 4, 1986 | 11.7/18 |
| 9 | 9 | "The IT Men" | Jack Shea | Emily Marshall | December 11, 1986 | 10.9/16 |
| 10 | 10 | "The Slumber Party" | Jack Shea | Linda Bloodworth-Thomason | December 18, 1986 | 9.5/15 |
| 11 | 11 | "New Year's Daze" | David Steinberg | Trish Vrandenburg | January 1, 1987 | 16.8/25 |
| 12 | 12 | "Old Spouses Never Die" | Barnet Kellman | Linda Bloodworth-Thomason | February 1, 1987 | 19.2/28 |
| 13 | 13 | "Old Spouses Never Die" | Barnet Kellman | Linda Bloodworth-Thomason | February 1, 1987 | 19.2/28 |
| 14 | 14 | "Monette" | Barnet Kellman | Linda Bloodworth-Thomason | February 8, 1987 | 14.5/21 |
| 15 | 15 | "And Justice for Paul" | Jack Shea | Trish Vrandenburg | February 15, 1987 | 13.3/19 |
| 16 | 16 | "Reese's Friend" | Arlene Sanford | Linda Bloodworth-Thomason | February 22, 1987 | 17.4/25 |
| 17 | 17 | "Nashville Bound" | Harry Thomason | Linda Bloodworth-Thomason | March 16, 1987 | 19.3/29 |
| 18 | 18 | "Oh, Suzannah" | Matthew Diamond | Linda Bloodworth-Thomason | March 23, 1987 | 17.7/27 |
| 19 | 19 | "Mary Jo's Dad Dates Charlene" | Jack Shea | Linda Bloodworth-Thomason | April 6, 1987 | 15.7/23 |
| 20 | 20 | "Seams from a Marriage" | Jack Shea | E. Jack Kaplan | April 13, 1987 | 15.4/24 |
| 21 | 21 | "Grand Slam, Thank You Ma'am" | Barnet Kellman | Linda Bloodworth-Thomason | May 4, 1987 | 16.0/25 |
| 22 | 22 | "Bachelor Suite" | Jack Shea | Linda Bloodworth-Thomason | May 11, 1987 | 14.7/23 |

=== Season 2 (1987–88) ===
| No. overall | No. in season | Title | Directed by | Written by | Original release date | Rating/share (households) |
|---|---|---|---|---|---|---|
| 23 | 1 | "101 Ways to Decorate a Gas Station" | Harry Thomason | Linda Bloodworth-Thomason | September 14, 1987 | 15.6/24 |
| 24 | 2 | "Ted Remarries" | Harry Thomason | Linda Bloodworth-Thomason | September 21, 1987 | 17.6/28 |
| 25 | 3 | "Anthony Jr." | David Trainer | Linda Bloodworth-Thomason | September 28, 1987 | 15.8/24 |
| 26 | 4 | "Killing All the Right People" | Harry Thomason | Linda Bloodworth-Thomason | October 5, 1987 | 18.6/29 |
| 27 | 5 | "Half an Air Bubble Off" | Harry Thomason | Linda Bloodworth-Thomason | October 19, 1987 | 15.4/23 |
| 28 | 6 | "Dash Goff, the Writer" | David Trainer | Linda Bloodworth-Thomason | October 26, 1987 | 16.6/26 |
| 29 | 7 | "Heart Attacks" | Matthew Diamond | Linda Bloodworth-Thomason | November 9, 1987 | 15.2/22 |
| 30 | 8 | "Cruising" | Harry Thomason | Linda Bloodworth-Thomason | November 16, 1987 | 14.3/21 |
| 31 | 9 | "I'll Be Seeing You" | David Trainer | Linda Bloodworth-Thomason | November 23, 1987 | 17.1/26 |
| 32 | 10 | "Stranded" | David Trainer | Linda Bloodworth-Thomason | December 7, 1987 | 15.6/24 |
| 33 | 11 | "Howard the Date" | Harry Thomason | Linda Bloodworth-Thomason | December 14, 1987 | 16.6/24 |
| 34 | 12 | "I'll Be Home for Christmas" | Harry Thomason | Linda Bloodworth-Thomason | December 21, 1987 | 14.4/22 |
| 35 | 13 | "Great Expectations" | David Trainer | Linda Bloodworth-Thomason | January 4, 1988 | 15.8/23 |
| 36 | 14 | "Second Time Around" | David Trainer | Linda Bloodworth-Thomason | January 11, 1988 | 16.8/25 |
| 37 | 15 | "Oh, Brother" | David Trainer | Linda Bloodworth-Thomason | January 18, 1988 | 17.4/26 |
| 38 | 16 | "There's Some Black People Coming to Dinner" | Jack Shea | Linda Bloodworth-Thomason | January 25, 1988 | 13.2/20 |
| 39 | 17 | "The Return of Ray Don" | David Trainer | Linda Bloodworth-Thomason | February 1, 1988 | 16.3/25 |
| 40 | 18 | "High Rollers" | Harry Thomason | Linda Bloodworth-Thomason | February 8, 1988 | 14.1/20 |
| 41 | 19 | "The Incredibly Elite Bona Fide Blue-Blood Beaumont Driving Club" | Matthew Diamond | Linda Bloodworth-Thomason | February 15, 1988 | 15.3/22 |
| 42 | 20 | "How Great Thou Art" | Harry Thomason | Linda Bloodworth-Thomason | February 22, 1988 | 13.7/20 |
| 43 | 21 | "Ted-Bare" | Hal Holbrook | Linda Bloodworth-Thomason | March 21, 1988 | 14.5/22 |
| 44 | 22 | "Reservations for Eight" | Hal Holbrook | Linda Bloodworth-Thomason | March 28, 1988 | 14.7/22 |

=== Season 3 (1988–89) ===
| No. overall | No. in season | Title | Directed by | Written by | Original release date | U.S. viewers (millions) | Rating/share (households) |
|---|---|---|---|---|---|---|---|
| 45 | 1 | "Reservations for 12, Plus Ursula" | David Trainer | Linda Bloodworth-Thomason | November 14, 1988 | 19.6 | 15.3/23 |
| 46 | 2 | "The Candidate" | David Trainer | Linda Bloodworth-Thomason | November 21, 1988 | 16.4 | 12.4/18 |
| 47 | 3 | "E.P., Phone Home" | David Trainer | Linda Bloodworth-Thomason | November 28, 1988 | 21.9 | 15.8/23 |
| 48 | 4 | "Getting Married and Eating Dirt" | David Trainer | Linda Bloodworth-Thomason | December 5, 1988 | 17.4 | 12.8/19 |
| 49 | 5 | "Big Haas and Little Falsie" | Harry Thomason | Linda Bloodworth-Thomason | December 12, 1988 | 21.1 | 15.5/23 |
| 50 | 6 | "Hard Hats and Lovers" | David Trainer | Linda Bloodworth-Thomason | December 19, 1988 | 21.2 | 15.1/23 |
| 51 | 7 | "Curtains" | David Trainer | Pam Norris | January 2, 1989 | 28.3 | 20.2/31 |
| 52 | 8 | "The Wilderness Experience" | David Trainer | Linda Bloodworth-Thomason | January 9, 1989 | 23.8 | 17.4/26 |
| 53 | 9 | "Tyrone" | David Trainer | Linda Bloodworth-Thomason | January 16, 1989 | 19.0 | 13.4/20 |
| 54 | 10 | "Mr. Bailey" | David Trainer | Pam Norris | January 23, 1989 | 23.1 | 16.4/24 |
| 55 | 11 | "The Naked Truth" | Iris Dugow | Linda Bloodworth-Thomason | February 13, 1989 | 20.7 | 15.1/23 |
| 56 | 12 | "The Junies" | David Trainer | Pam Norris | February 20, 1989 | 19.1 | 13.4/20 |
| 57 | 13 | "One Sees, the Other Doesn't" | Ron Troutman | Pam Norris | February 27, 1989 | 20.1 | 14.6/22 |
| 58 | 14 | "Odell" | Dwayne Hickman | Cassandra Clark & Debbie Pearl | March 6, 1989 | 19.3 | 14.2/21 |
| 59 | 15 | "Full Moon" | David Trainer | Linda Bloodworth-Thomason | March 13, 1989 | 22.7 | 16.2/25 |
| 60 | 16 | "Ms. Meal Ticket" | Hal Holbrook | Linda Bloodworth-Thomason | March 20, 1989 | 20.5 | 15.1/22 |
| 61 | 17 | "The Engagement" | David Trainer | Pam Norris | March 27, 1989 | 19.3 | 14.6/23 |
| 62 | 18 | "Come on and Marry Me, Bill" | David Trainer | Linda Bloodworth-Thomason | April 10, 1989 | 21.8 | 16.3/25 |
| 63 | 19 | "The Women of Atlanta" | Harry Thomason | Linda Bloodworth-Thomason | May 1, 1989 | 21.6 | 15.5/24 |
| 64 | 20 | "Stand and Fight" | David Trainer | Pam Norris | May 8, 1989 | 19.7 | 14.3/21 |
| 65 | 21 | "The Last Humorously-Dressed Bellboy in America" | David Trainer | Linda Bloodworth-Thomason | May 15, 1989 | 17.2 | 12.7/19 |
| 66 | 22 | "Julia Drives Over the First Amendment" | David Trainer | Pam Norris | May 22, 1989 | 18.6 | 13.3/21 |

=== Season 4 (1989–90) ===
| No. overall | No. in season | Title | Directed by | Written by | Original release date | U.S. viewers (millions) |
|---|---|---|---|---|---|---|
| 67 | 1 | "The Proxy Pig and Great Pretenders" | Harry Thomason | Linda Bloodworth-Thomason | September 18, 1989 | 20.4 |
| 68 | 2 | "One Night with You" | David Trainer | Linda Bloodworth-Thomason | September 25, 1989 | 20.3 |
| 69 | 3 | "There She Is" | David Trainer | Pam Norris | October 2, 1989 | 17.5 |
| 70 | 4 | "Nightmare from Hee Haw" | David Trainer | Linda Bloodworth-Thomason | October 16, 1989 | 19.9 |
| 71 | 5 | "The Girlfriend" | David Trainer | Pam Norris | October 23, 1989 | 18.6 |
| 72 | 6 | "The Rowdy Girls" | David Trainer | Linda Bloodworth-Thomason | October 30, 1989 | 18.5 |
| 73 | 7 | "Bernice's Sanity Hearing" | David Trainer | Linda Bloodworth-Thomason | November 13, 1989 | 18.4 |
| 74 | 8 | "Julia Gets Her Head Stuck in a Fence" | David Trainer | Pam Norris | November 20, 1989 | 21.1 |
| 75 | 9 | "Julia and Suzanne's Big Adventure" | Dwayne Hickman | Pam Norris | November 27, 1989 | 18.6 |
| 76 | 10 | "Manhunt" | David Trainer | Pam Norris | December 4, 1989 | 21.0 |
| 77 | 11 | "They Shoot Fat Women, Don't They?" | Harry Thomason | Linda Bloodworth-Thomason | December 11, 1989 | 24.1 |
| 78 | 12 | "You Got to Have Friends" | David Trainer | Pam Norris | December 18, 1989 | 23.6 |
| 79 | 13 | "The First Day of the Last Decade of the Entire Twentieth Century" | Harry Thomason | Linda Bloodworth-Thomason | January 1, 1990 | 31.0 |
| 80 | 14 | "The First Day of the Last Decade of the Entire Twentieth Century" | Harry Thomason | Linda Bloodworth-Thomason | January 1, 1990 | 31.0 |
| 81 | 15 | "The Mistress" | Iris Dugow | Linda Bloodworth-Thomason | January 8, 1990 | 26.6 |
| 82 | 16 | "The Fur Flies" | Hal Holbrook | Pam Norris | January 15, 1990 | 24.5 |
| 83 | 17 | "Oh, What a Feeling" | David Trainer | Paul Clay | January 29, 1990 | 22.4 |
| 84 | 18 | "Anthony and Vanessa" | David Trainer | Linda Bloodworth-Thomason | February 5, 1990 | 23.9 |
| 85 | 19 | "Payne Grows Up" | David Trainer | Pam Norris | February 19, 1990 | 20.2 |
| 86 | 20 | "Tornado Watch" | William Crain | Linda Bloodworth-Thomason | February 26, 1990 | 22.9 |
| 87 | 21 | "Tough Enough" | David Trainer | Pam Norris | March 12, 1990 | 21.6 |
| 88 | 22 | "It's a Wonderful Life" | David Trainer | Thom Bray and Michael Ross | March 19, 1990 | 20.1 |
| 89 | 23 | "Suzanne Goes Looking for a Friend" | David Trainer | Dee LaDuke & Mark Alton Brown | April 9, 1990 | 22.9 |
| 90 | 24 | "Foreign Affairs" | David Trainer | Cheryl Bascom | April 30, 1990 | 23.7 |
| 91 | 25 | "Have Faith" | David Trainer | Paul Clay and Pam Norris | May 7, 1990 | 19.6 |
| 92 | 26 | "Their Finest Hour" | Ellen Falcon, Harry Thomason and David Trainer | Linda Bloodworth-Thomason | May 9, 1990 | 16.5 |
| 93 | 27 | "Anthony's Graduation" | David Trainer | Linda Bloodworth-Thomason | May 14, 1990 | 23.5 |
| 94 | 28 | "La Place sans Souci" | Iris Dugow | Linda Bloodworth-Thomason | May 21, 1990 | 25.1 |

=== Season 5 (1990–91) ===
| No. overall | No. in season | Title | Directed by | Written by | Original release date | U.S. viewers (millions) |
|---|---|---|---|---|---|---|
| 95 | 1 | "A Blast from the Past" | David Trainer | Pam Norris | September 17, 1990 | 28.4 |
| 96 | 2 | "Papa Was a Rolling Stone" | David Trainer | Cassandra Clark & Debbie Pearl | September 24, 1990 | 25.4 |
| 97 | 3 | "Working Mother" | David Trainer | Pam Norris | October 1, 1990 | 25.7 |
| 98 | 4 | "Miss Trial" | David Trainer | Dee LaDuke & Mark Alton Brown | October 15, 1990 | 22.6 |
| 99 | 5 | "The Bachelor Auction" | David Trainer | Pam Norris | October 22, 1990 | 28.0 |
| 100 | 6 | "Charlene Buys a House" | David Trainer | Pam Norris | October 29, 1990 | 26.8 |
| 101 | 7 | "Old Rebels and Young Models" | Iris Dugow | Dee LaDuke & Mark Alton Brown | November 5, 1990 | 26.1 |
| 102 | 8 | "Nowhere to Run To" | David Trainer | Cassandra Clark & Debbie Pearl | November 12, 1990 | 24.1 |
| 103 | 9 | "A Class Act" | Dwayne Hickman | Cassandra Clark & Debbie Pearl | November 19, 1990 | 25.1 |
| 104 | 10 | "Keep the Homes Fires Burning" | David Trainer | Dee LaDuke & Mark Alton Brown | November 26, 1990 | 24.3 |
| 105 | 11 | "My Daughter, Myself" | David Trainer | Pam Norris | December 10, 1990 | 21.7 |
| 106 | 12 | "And Now, Here's Bernice" | David Trainer | Dee LaDuke & Mark Alton Brown | December 17, 1990 | 22.1 |
| 107 | 13 | "Pearls of Wisdom" | David Trainer | Pam Norris | January 7, 1991 | 29.9 |
| 108 | 14 | "High Noon in a Laundry Room" | David Trainer | Dee LaDuke & Mark Alton Brown | January 14, 1991 | 26.1 |
| 109 | 15 | "How Long Has This Been Going On?" | David Trainer | Cassandra Clark & Debbie Pearl | January 28, 1991 | 22.2 |
| 110 | 16 | "The Emperor's New Nose" | David Trainer | Thom Bray & Michael Ross | February 4, 1991 | 26.4 |
| 111 | 17 | "Maybe Baby" | David Trainer | Pam Norris | February 11, 1991 | 24.4 |
| 112 | 18 | "This Is Art?" | Roberta Sherry Scelza | Steven Roth & Deanne Roth | February 25, 1991 | 24.0 |
| 113 | 19 | "Blame It on New Orleans" | David Trainer | Dee LaDuke & Mark Alton Brown | March 4, 1991 | 24.2 |
| 114 | 20 | "I'll See You in Court" | David Trainer | Cassandra Clark & Debbie Pearl | March 18, 1991 | 22.6 |
| 115 | 21 | "The Big Circle" | David Trainer | Pam Norris | April 8, 1991 | 24.6 |
| 116 | 22 | "Friends and Husbands" | David Trainer | Cassandra Clark & Debbie Pearl | April 29, 1991 | 17.2 |
| 117 | 23 | "Fore!" | David Trainer | Pam Norris | May 6, 1991 | 21.5 |
| 118 | 24 | "The Pride of Sugarbakers" | Iris Dugow | Thom Bray & Michael A. Ross | May 13, 1991 | 21.7 |

=== Season 6 (1991–92) ===
| No. overall | No. in season | Title | Directed by | Written by | Original release date | U.S. viewers (millions) |
|---|---|---|---|---|---|---|
| 119 | 1 | "The Big Desk" | Harry Thomason | Linda Bloodworth-Thomason | September 16, 1991 | 30.1 |
| 120 | 2 | "The Big Desk" | Harry Thomason | Linda Bloodworth-Thomason | September 16, 1991 | 30.1 |
| 121 | 3 | "A Toe in the Water" | David Steinberg | Pam Norris | September 23, 1991 | 27.1 |
| 122 | 4 | "Dwayne's World" | David Steinberg | Paul Clay & Pam Norris | September 30, 1991 | 25.9 |
| 123 | 5 | "Marriage Most Foul" | David Steinberg | Dee LaDuke & Mark Alton Brown | October 7, 1991 | 25.6 |
| 124 | 6 | "Picking a Winner" | Asaad Kelada | Dee LaDuke & Mark Alton Brown | October 14, 1991 | 24.4 |
| 125 | 7 | "Last Tango in Atlanta" | Charles Frank | Thom Bray and Michael Ross | October 21, 1991 | 21.2 |
| 126 | 8 | "The Strange Case of Clarence and Anita" | David Steinberg | Linda Bloodworth-Thomason | November 4, 1991 | 23.8 |
| 127 | 9 | "Just Say Doe" | David Steinberg | Andrea Carla Michaels | November 11, 1991 | 24.3 |
| 128 | 10 | "Julia and Rusty, Sittin' in a Tree" | David Steinberg | Thom Bray & Michael A. Ross | November 18, 1991 | 24.2 |
| 129 | 11 | "Julia and Mary Jo Get Stuck Under a Bed" | David Steinberg | Linda Bloodworth-Thomason | December 2, 1991 | 23.4 |
| 130 | 12 | "Real, Scary Men" | David Steinberg | Cathryn Michon | December 9, 1991 | 23.1 |
| 131 | 13 | "Tales Out of School" | David Steinberg | Paul Clay & Pam Norris | December 16, 1991 | 24.7 |
| 132 | 14 | "Driving My Mama Back Home" | William Cosentino | Dee LaDuke & Mark Alton Brown | January 6, 1992 | 26.2 |
| 133 | 15 | "Payne Comes Home" | Paul Clay | Eleanor S. Hyde-White | January 13, 1992 | 24.0 |
| 134 | 16 | "Carlene's Apartment" | David Steinberg | Paul Clay | January 20, 1992 | 24.8 |
| 135 | 17 | "Mamed" | David Steinberg | Dee LaDuke & Mark Alton Brown | February 3, 1992 | 23.7 |
| 136 | 18 | "A Scene from a Mall" | David Steinberg | Dee LaDuke & Mark Alton Brown | February 24, 1992 | 23.5 |
| 137 | 19 | "All About Odes to Atlanta" | David Steinberg | Dee LaDuke & Mark Alton Brown | March 2, 1992 | 24.3 |
| 138 | 20 | "I Enjoy Being a Girl" | David Steinberg | Norma Safford Vela | March 9, 1992 | 23.3 |
| 139 | 21 | "L.A. Story" | Roberta Sherry Scelza | Paul Clay | March 23, 1992 | 25.9 |
| 140 | 22 | "A Little Night Music" | David Steinberg | Linda Bloodworth-Thomason | April 27, 1992 | 23.2 |
| 141 | 23 | "Shades of Vanessa" | Art Dielhenn | Linda Bloodworth-Thomason | May 4, 1992 | 24.3 |

=== Season 7 (1992–93) ===
| No. overall | No. in season | Title | Directed by | Written by | Original release date | U.S. viewers (millions) |
|---|---|---|---|---|---|---|
| 142 | 1 | "Of Human Bondage" | David Steinberg | Linda Bloodworth-Thomason | September 25, 1992 | 18.0 |
| 143 | 2 | "Sex and the Single Woman" | David Steinberg | Dee LaDuke & Mark Alton Brown | October 2, 1992 | 14.7 |
| 144 | 3 | "Mary Jo vs. the Terminator" | David Steinberg | Dee LaDuke & Mark Alton Brown | October 16, 1992 | 15.5 |
| 145 | 4 | "On the Road Again" | David Steinberg | Dee LaDuke & Mark Alton Brown | October 23, 1992 | 15.3 |
| 146 | 5 | "Screaming Passages" | David Steinberg | Norma Safford Vela | October 30, 1992 | 13.8 |
| 147 | 6 | "Viva Las Vegas" | Charles Frank | Linda Bloodworth-Thomason | November 6, 1992 | 13.6 |
| 148 | 7 | "Fools Rush In" | David Steinberg | Linda Jean LaBrown | November 13, 1992 | 16.0 |
| 149 | 8 | "Love Letters" | David Steinberg | Norma Safford Vela | November 20, 1992 | 14.7 |
| 150 | 9 | "The Vision Thing" | David Steinberg | Norma Safford Vela | December 4, 1992 | 13.5 |
| 151 | 10 | "Trial and Error" | David Steinberg | Danny Margosis & Robert Horn | December 11, 1992 | 12.5 |
| 152 | 11 | "Too Dumb to Date" | David Steinberg | Jeannie Elias | January 8, 1993 | 14.6 |
| 153 | 12 | "The Odyssey" | David Steinberg | Dee LaDuke & Mark Alton Brown | January 15, 1993 | 14.0 |
| 154 | 13 | "Oh Dog, Poor Dog" | David Steinberg | Cathryn Michon | January 22, 1993 | 12.4 |
| 155 | 14 | "Wedding Redux" | David Steinberg | Mimi Pond | February 5, 1993 | 14.0 |
| 156 | 15 | "Nude Julia, New York Morning" | David Steinberg | Emily Levine | February 12, 1993 | 15.9 |
| 157 | 16 | "Sex, Lies and Bad Hair Days" | David Steinberg | Danny Margosis & Robert Horn | March 5, 1993 | 11.9 |
| 158 | 17 | "Shovel Off to Buffalo" | David Steinberg | Emily Levine | March 12, 1993 | 13.7 |
| 159 | 18 | "It's Not So Easy Being Green" | David Steinberg | Emily Levine | April 2, 1993 | 14.0 |
| 160 | 19 | "The Woman Who Came to Sugarbakers" | David Steinberg | Emily Levine | April 30, 1993 | 8.7 |
| 161 | 20 | "The Lying Game" | David Steinberg | Danny Margosis & Robert Horn | May 7, 1993 | 8.9 |
| 162 | 21 | "Gone with a Whim" | David Steinberg | Danny Margosis & Robert Horn and David Steinberg | May 24, 1993 | 18.9 |
| 163 | 22 | "Gone with a Whim" | David Steinberg | Danny Margosis & Robert Horn and David Steinberg | May 24, 1993 | 18.9 |

== Reunion special ==
| Title | Directed by | Written by | Original release date |
|---|---|---|---|
| "The Designing Women Reunion" | Harry Thomason | Allen Crowe & Pam Norris | July 28, 2003 |
Dixie Carter, Annie Potts, Jean Smart, Delta Burke and Meshach Taylor reunited to share behind-the-scenes memories from their time on the series. Topics included initial casting and favorite episodes. Clips from many episodes are played, as well as new interviews with additional cast members, crew members and others associated with the world of television. Guest stars: Alice Ghostley, Linda Bloodworth-Thomason
