= Killing All the Right People =

- Designing Women episode
- Episode no.: Season 2 Episode 4
- Directed by: Harry Thomason
- Written by: Linda Bloodworth-Thomason
- Original air date: October 5, 1987

Guest appearances
- Tony Goldwyn; Alice Ghostley; Camilla Carr; Joan Roberts

Episode chronology
← Previous "Anthony Jr."	Next → "Half an Air Bubble Off"
- Designing Women (season 2)

"Killing All the Right People" is the 26th episode of the sitcom Designing Women. Originally airing on October 5, 1987, as the fourth episode of the second season. It features Tony Goldwyn as Kendall Dobbs, a young gay man dying of AIDS who asks the Sugarbaker ladies to design his funeral. Series creator Linda Bloodworth-Thomason's mother died of AIDS and her experience with her mother's disease and the prejudice associated with it inspired the episode.

== Plot ==
Kendall Dobbs (Tony Goldwyn), a young interior designer and friend of the Sugarbaker firm, approaches the women with an unusual request: he wants them to design his funeral because he is dying of AIDS. At first the firm is reluctant but agrees to take the assignment.

Later, Mary Jo (Annie Potts) is at a PTA meeting at her daughter Claudia's high school at which a resolution to the school board about distributing birth control to students on request is being discussed. Mary Jo is in favor for both preventing pregnancies and the spread of HIV. A decision is made to hold a debate the following week, and Mary Jo, the only person to speak in favor of the proposal, is reluctantly drafted to argue for it.

A few days later, Mary Jo frets over what she is going to say at the debate and about being nicknamed "The Condom Queen". She notes that she wishes she could be as passionate as Julia (Dixie Carter) when expressing herself in such situations, and asks Julia if she can get "fired up" so that Mary Jo can watch and learn from her. Julia explains that she "doesn't feel fired up right now".

Kendall drops by to go over his funeral arrangements. He is shocked when Charlene (Jean Smart) casually takes his hand, saying that even some of the nurses in the hospital refused to enter his room. In the background, Imogene Salinger (Camilla Carr), an acquaintance of Julia's and a client of the firm, overhears the plans for the funeral and states that gay men like Kendall are getting what they deserve. "As far as I'm concerned," Imogene says, "this disease has one thing going for it: it's killing all the right people." Julia angrily confronts Imogene over her belief that AIDS is God's punishment for homosexuality. "Imogene, get serious! Who do you think you're talking to?! I've known you for 27 years, and all I can say is, if God was giving out sexually transmitted diseases to people as a punishment for sinning, then you would be at the free clinic all the time! And so would the rest of us!" Imogene storms out of the store, announcing that she will take her business elsewhere in the future while Julia in turn tells her that bigots like her will not be welcomed at Sugarbaker's before slamming the door on her. It is noted that during the confrontation, Suzanne sticks up for Kendall by asking Imogene that if AIDS was so rampant in the gay community, "then how come lesbians get it less?"

Later, Julia, Suzanne, Charlene, and Sugarbaker friend Bernice Clifton (Alice Ghostley) all attend Mary Jo's PTA debate. During the debate, Mary Jo struggles to make her points but is cut off repeatedly by her opponent, Carolyn Jackson (Joan Roberts), who is against the birth control proposal. As Kendall enters with Anthony (Meshach Taylor), Mary Jo is finally able to articulate her closing statement:

What I am saying is that I have a dear, sweet, funny friend, 24 years old, not very much older than the kids that we're talking about here, and he came to me this week and asked me to help plan his funeral, because he's dying... from AIDS...something that he got before he even knew what it was or how to prevent it. I've been thinking a lot about his mother this week, and what she might give for the opportunity that I have tonight—that we all still have here tonight—because now we know how to help prevent AIDS. And I think that it really shouldn't matter what your personal views are about birth control, because, you see, we're not, we're not just talking about preventing births anymore, we're talking about preventing deaths. 25,000 Americans have died and we're still debating. For me, this debate is over. More important than what any civic leader or PTA or board of education thinks about teenagers having sex or any immoral act that my daughter or your son might engage in is the bottom line that I don't think they should have to die for it. Thank you.

The audience applauds Mary Jo, followed by a freeze frame of Kendall, and the episode ends with his funeral. A closed black coffin is shown and the funeral home room is designed French Quarter-style as Kendall requested, since his family is from New Orleans, and a Dixieland band plays "Just a Closer Walk with Thee", as Kendall previously requested because that was the hymn he grew up on. All of the ladies, as well as Anthony and Bernice, are present.

== Production ==
"Killing All the Right People" was written by Linda Bloodworth-Thomason, the creator of Designing Women, whose own mother died after contracting AIDS from a blood transfusion. Although there was a screening test available that could have been used to identify unsafe blood, not all blood banks and hospitals used it, allowing infected blood to be unknowingly spread through transfusions. During her mother's illness, Bloodworth-Thomason saw firsthand the prejudice AIDS patients experienced, especially gay men. The episode's title came from a comment she overheard from one of the hospital's nurses: "The good thing about AIDS is that it's killing all the right people." She incorporated a version of the remark into the episode's script.

== Awards ==
"Killing All the Right People" was nominated for two Emmy Awards. Linda Bloodworth-Thomason was nominated for Outstanding Writing in a Comedy Series and Roger Bondelli received a nomination for Outstanding Editing for a Series - Multi-Camera Production.

== See also ==
- HIV and AIDS misconceptions
- HIV/AIDS in the United States
- List of Designing Women episodes
