= Women of the House =

Spin-off of Designing Women TV series

- The original cast of Women of the House
- Genre: Sitcom
- Created by: Linda Bloodworth-Thomason
- Written by: Linda Bloodworth-Thomason
- Directed by: Harry Thomason
- Starring: Delta Burke; Teri Garr; Patricia Heaton; Valerie Mahaffey; Lisa Rieffel; William Newman
- Composer: Bruce Miller
- Country of origin: United States
- Original language: English
- No. of seasons: 1
- No. of episodes: 13

Production
- Running time: 30 minutes
- Production companies: Bloodworth-Thomason Mozark Productions; Perseverance Inc.; TriStar Television

Original release
- Network: CBS (episodes 1–8); Lifetime (episodes 9–13)
- Release: January 4 – September 8, 1995

Related
- Designing Women

Women of the House is an American sitcom television series and a spin-off of Designing Women that aired on CBS from January 4 to August 18, 1995, and the last four episodes airing on Lifetime on September 8, 1995. The series starred Delta Burke, reprising her role of Suzanne Sugarbaker, who had reconciled with producers of Designing Women after a bitter, highly publicized, off-screen battle.

== Premise ==
Suzanne Sugarbaker's latest husband has died, and as his widow, she assumes his political office for the remainder of his term. Washington, D.C. was ill-prepared for the outspoken, "big, dumb, hick beauty queen's" arrival to the United States House of Representatives, though she did form an unusual bond with then-current President Bill Clinton, who was frequently heard off-screen. Along with her, Suzanne dragged her mentally disabled brother Jim (Jonathan Banks); her young, adopted daughter Desiree (Brittany Parkyn); and her often mentioned (but only once seen) maid, Sapphire Jones (Barbara Montgomery).

Teri Garr starred as Suzanne's press secretary Sissy Emerson, a washed up reporter who had turned to the bottle a few years earlier, but was starting to clean up her act. Patricia Heaton portrayed Natty Hollingsworth, Suzanne's snooty, conservative administrative assistant whose married Congressman boyfriend was serving a prison sentence. Jennifer Malone (Valerie Mahaffey, Julie Hagerty), known to her co-workers as "Malone", was a vivacious, naïve housewife who was recently left by her husband, and whose children were tyrants. Years of sexual repression had taken their toll on Malone and she was becoming obsessed with sex.

Malone was later replaced by Veda Walkman (Lisa Rieffel), a ditzy young woman who took an internship at the office. In more minor roles were William Newman as Dave, an older gentleman with bad arthritis who worked in the office and Adam Carl as Adam, another intern (which was not the same-named character Carl played in several episodes of Designing Women).

== Cast ==
=== Main ===
- Delta Burke as Suzanne Sugarbaker
- Teri Garr as Sissy Emerson, Suzanne's press secretary
- Patricia Heaton as Natalie "Natty" Hollingsworth, Suzanne's administrative assistant
- Valerie Mahaffey (episodes 1–4, 7) and Julie Hagerty (episodes 5–6) as Jennifer Malone, Suzanne's receptionist
- Lisa Rieffel (episodes 8–12) as Veda Walkman, Suzanne's Congressional intern

=== Recurring ===
- Jonathan Banks as Jim Sugarbaker, Suzanne's intellectually disabled brother
- Brittany Parkyn as Desiree "Desi" Sugarbaker, Suzanne's adopted daughter
- William Newman as Dave, another member of Suzanne's staff
- Adam Carl as Adam

=== Notable guest stars ===
- Jamie Farr guest starred as himself in the episode "Guess Who's Sleeping in Lincoln's Bed?", and he gave a nod to the series M*A*S*H by appearing in drag. Amongst the writing staff of M*A*S*H was Women of the House writer/creator Linda Bloodworth-Thomason.
- Gerald McRaney made an appearance in "The Afternoon Wife," playing Suzanne's ex-husband, novelist Dash Goff, a character that originated on Designing Women. By this point, McRaney and series lead Delta Burke were married in real life.
- Meshach Taylor reprised his Designing Women role of Anthony Bouvier in the episode "Dear Diary".
- Susan Powter was initially announced as a cast member of the series. She finally showed up in the penultimate episode, "Dear Diary".
- Charles Frank appeared as the oft-spoken of Congressman Ed Sharkey in the final episode, "The Conjugal Cottage." Frank starred opposite Delta Burke and Dixie Carter in Linda Bloodworth-Thomason's 1982 sitcom Filthy Rich.
- Telma Hopkins starred as a wisecracking cop in the episode "The Conjugal Cottage."
- The episode "Women in Film" featured cameos by Loni Anderson, Roseanne Barr, Carol Burnett, Brett Butler, Rita Moreno, Marilyn Chambers, Marilyn McCoo, Deidre Hall, Elizabeth Ashley, Joan Van Ark, and Stefanie Powers.

== Episodes ==
No.	Title	Directed by	Written by	Original release date	Viewers (millions)
1	"Miss Sugarbaker Goes to Washington"	Harry Thomason	Linda Bloodworth-Thomason	January 4, 1995	17.0
2	"Miss Sugarbaker Goes to Washington"	Harry Thomason	Linda Bloodworth-Thomason	January 4, 1995	17.0
Suzanne arrives in Washington to fill her husband's seat in Congress. She agrees to go on CNN's political Crossfire TV series, on which she gets herself involved in a scandal dubbed Knickknackgate. Note: This episode is double-length.
3	"Guess Who's Sleeping in Lincoln's Bed"	Harry Thomason	Linda Bloodworth-Thomason	January 9, 1995	19.0
When the Clintons cancel their dinner engagement at the last moment, they invite Suzanne to stay at the White House. Once there, she promptly destroys the historic Lincoln Bed. Meanwhile, Malone begins obsessively sketching nude men.
4	"That's What Friends Are For"	Harry Thomason	Linda Bloodworth-Thomason	January 11, 1995	12.0
Sissy finds herself homeless just as her deprecating rival comes to town. Meanwhile, Suzanne decides to write an article about the "interracial bond" she shares with her maid, Sapphire.
5	"Men Are Good"	Harry Thomason	Linda Bloodworth-Thomason	January 18, 1995	11.9
Malone, who has never dated anyone but her high school sweetheart, is asked out by a handsome widower.
6	"You Talk Too Much"	Harry Thomason	Linda Bloodworth-Thomason	January 25, 1995	10.2
The staff convenes at Suzanne's house to randomly monitor violence against women on television for an upcoming congressional hearing. Meanwhile, Suzanne is trying to diet, and Natty and Sissy feud over the Republican Party's new control of the House.
7	"Bad Girl"	Harry Thomason	Linda Bloodworth-Thomason	February 1, 1995	10.4
Malone has a pregnancy scare, Suzanne arranges a meeting with Alaskan fishermen, and Sissy sells obscene lingerie.
8	"The Afternoon Wife"	Harry Thomason	Linda Bloodworth-Thomason	March 20, 1995	14.6
Suzanne's ex-husband Dash Goff (Gerald McRaney) writes a novel based on their marriage, but Suzanne becomes jealous when he flirts with all of her staffers. McRaney reprises his recurring role from Designing Women.
9	"Veda"	Harry Thomason	Linda Bloodworth-Thomason	August 18, 1995	4.9
Young, sweet, bubbly, "potty-mouth" Veda Walkman joins the office on an internship and instantly annoys her co-workers. Meanwhile Sissy and Natty engage in practical jokes.
10	"Women in Film"	Harry Thomason	Linda Bloodworth-Thomason	September 8, 1995	N/A
Suzanne's staff gathers to again to review violence against women on film for a congressional hearing. A bevy of female stars have cameos, speaking out against violent and exploitive films.
11	"Conjugal Cottage"	Harry Thomason	Linda Bloodworth-Thomason	September 8, 1995	N/A
Natalie becomes violently ill the same weekend that she's planned to spend with her imprisoned lover. Sissy takes her place to keep Ed (Charles Frank) from losing the privilege of the conjugal cottage. Meanwhile the ladies try out a line of indestructible pantyhose. Charles Frank reunites with his Filthy Rich co-star Delta Burke and writer Linda Bloodworth-Thomason.
12	"North to Alaska"	Harry Thomason	Linda Bloodworth-Thomason	September 8, 1995	N/A
Suzanne, Sissy and Natty are sent to Alaska to investigate the spawning habits of salmon. The ladies are awed by the abundance of attractive, eligible bachelors, and they each wind up being bitten by the love bug.
13	"Dear Diary"	Harry Thomason	Linda Bloodworth-Thomason	September 8, 1995	N/A
Congresswoman Kirby Seizmore (Susan Powter) from the Ethics Committee launches an investigation into Suzanne's activities, so Suzanne turns to visiting friend Anthony Bouvier to dispose of her diary. Meshach Taylor reprises his role from Designing Women.

== Home media ==
Mill Creek Entertainment had secured the rights to the complete series, which was slated to be released on DVD in early 2011. In April 2011, it was announced that the DVD release had been cancelled due to "issues surrounding the source material delivery." On February 6, 2018, Questar Entertainment released Women of the House: The Complete Series on DVD in Region 1.
