= Linda Elliott =

Linda Elliott may refer to:

- Elizabeth Elliott (romance author), born Linda Elliott
- Linda Elliott (The Doctors), character in The Doctors played by Dixie Carter
