= Lisa Peluso =

American soap opera actress (born 1964)

- Born: July 29, 1964 (age 62); Philadelphia, Pennsylvania, U.S.
- Occupation: Actress
- Years active: 1975–2010
- Spouse: Brad Guice
- Children: 2

Lisa Peluso (born July 29, 1964) is an American former soap opera actress. She started her career as a child actor in 1975, progressing to teenaged then adult roles. Her final screen appearance was in a 2010 short film, as an unnamed party guest.

== Life and career ==
Peluso was born in Philadelphia, Pennsylvania, the daughter of Mary Peluso. Her first big break came at the age of nine, when she starred in the Broadway production of Gypsy with Angela Lansbury. In 1977, at age thirteen, she played Linda, the younger sister of John Travolta's Tony, in Saturday Night Fever.

Later in 1977, Peluso debuted on daytime television as Wendy Wilkins on Search for Tomorrow, a role she played until December 1985, one year before the series ended.

Other long-running soap credentials include her portrayal of "Ava Rescott Masters" on Loving (1988–1995), as well as her portrayal of Lila Hart Roberts Cory Winthrop on Another World (1997–1999) and continued the character on As the World Turns (1999). She has also appeared twice on the ABC soap opera One Life to Live, first as "Billie Giordano" from 1987 to 1988, then as "Gina Russo" in 2001.

She also made a guest star appearance on Designing Women, playing the title character in the 1987 episode "Reese's Friend", who irritates lead character Julia Sugarbaker by flirting with Sugarbaker's boyfriend.

== Personal life ==
Peluso and her husband, photographer Brad Guice, have two children together: their first child, daughter Phoebe Ann, shares the same birthday (July 29) as Peluso; the birth of their younger child, son Parker Nathaniel, featured with Peluso on a 2002 episode of the TLC Network series A Baby Story.
