= Filthy Rich (1982 TV series) =

- Genre: Sitcom
- Created by: Linda Bloodworth-Thomason
- Written by: Linda Bloodworth-Thomason; E. Jack Kaplan
- Directed by: Rod Daniel; Wes Kenney
- Starring: Delta Burke; Dixie Carter; Charles Frank; Michael Lombard; Jerry Hardin; Nedra Volz; Ann Wedgeworth
- Composers: Bucky Jones; Ronnie McDowell
- Country of origin: United States
- Original language: English
- No. of seasons: 2
- No. of episodes: 15

Production
- Executive producers: Linda Bloodworth-Thomason; Larry White
- Producer: E. Jack Kaplan
- Camera setup: Multi-camera
- Running time: 22–24 minutes
- Production companies: Columbia Pictures Television; L.J. Bloodworth Productions; Larry White Productions

Original release
- Network: CBS
- Release: August 9, 1982 – June 15, 1983

Filthy Rich is an American sitcom that aired on CBS from August 1982 to June 1983. Its stars included Dixie Carter and Charles Frank, and the series satirized prime-time soap operas such as Dallas and Dynasty.

== Premise ==
The series was set in Memphis at a fictional mansion called Toad Hall, which was owned by one Big Guy Beck (Slim Pickens in the pilot, and Forrest Tucker afterwards), a very wealthy land baron. He had recently died of an undisclosed illness, and before he was cryonically frozen he had made out a videotaped will, a piece of which was played every week by his lawyer, George Wilhoit (David Healy and Vernon Weddle).

The will's terms were harshest on Big Guy's older son, snobbish Marshall Beck (Michael Lombard) and his equally-snobbish wife Carlotta (Dixie Carter). Also aghast at the will's terms was Big Guy's wily younger wife Kathleen (Delta Burke). The terms stated that the family wouldn't be able to collect a dime of their inheritance until they accepted Big Guy's illegitimate son, Wild Bill Westchester (Jerry Hardin) and his good-natured but ditzy wife Bootsie (Ann Wedgeworth) into their family.

Many of the situations stemmed from the conniving Carlotta, Marshall and Kathleen's schemes to declare the terms and constraints of the will invalid and also to rid themselves of Wild Bill and Bootsie, not to mention the rest of the family, out of their lives, so the snobs could live it up on the money they would receive. Their wildly outlandish schemes usually and inevitably ended up failing.

Also appearing were Nedra Volz, who played Big Guy's senile first wife, Winona Beck, called Mother B., who had escaped from her nursing home; and Charles Frank, who played Big Guy's younger son Stanley.

Stanley, independently wealthy because he invested his money wisely, and thus not concerned about his inheritance from his father, was the nicest of the whole lot. Usually, it was Stanley who was able to protect Wild Bill and Bootsie (whom he and Mother B. accepted outright) from the devious scheming of his stepmother, who lusted after him; and his conniving brother and sister in-law.

== Cast ==
- Delta Burke as Kathleen Beck, Big Guy's much younger second wife
- Nedra Volz as Winona "Mother B" Beck, Big Guy's first wife and the senile mother of Marshall and Stanley
- Dixie Carter as Carlotta Beck, Marshall's shrewish wife and Big Guy's daughter-in-law
- Michael Lombard as Marshall Beck, Big Guy and Mother B's bisexual older son
- Charles Frank as Stanley Beck, Big Guy and Mother B's son and Marshall's independently-wealthy younger brother
- Jerry Hardin as Wild Bill Westchester, a used RV salesman and Big Guy's illegitimate younger son.
- Ann Wedgeworth as Bootsie Westchester, Wild Bill's gentle-natured but ditzy wife
- Slim Pickens (s. 1) & Forrest Tucker (s. 2) as Big Guy Beck, a very wealthy land baron and the patriarch of Toad Hall.
- David Healy (s. 1) & Vernon Weddle (s. 2) as George Wilhoit, Big Guy's lawyer and executor of his will

== Production ==
Series creator Linda Bloodworth-Thomason, coming off an Emmy Award nomination for co-writing a script for an episode of M*A*S*H, formed her own production company and produced multiple Television pilots. In 1980, she got the idea for Filthy Rich. The hourlong pilot was filmed on February 27, 1981 as a candidate for inclusion on CBS's 1981–82 fall schedule. When the fall schedule was announced in May, Filthy Rich wasn't included, but the network optioned it as a potential midseason replacement. Delta Burke was forced to turn down roles on Dallas and Private Benjamin due to being under contract for Filthy Rich. Dixie Carter was asked to replace Tammy Grimes in the Broadway production of 42nd Street, but CBS prevented her from accepting.

In March 1982, CBS ordered a second pilot episode, this time as a half-hour show. The network stipulated that they wanted the new pilot to be "less bizarre" than the original pilot had been, and though the material was toned down, they still passed on including the show on the fall schedule.

The original hourlong pilot was split in two and re-edited, then packaged with the second pilot (titled "Town and Garden"), and the episodes were billed as a "limited run" series which was broadcast on Monday nights following reruns of M*A*S*H in August 1982. Much to CBS's surprise, the show topped the weekly Nielsen ratings for three consecutive weeks. CBS Entertainment President Donald "Bud" Grant later commented, "I think we conned ourselves into thinking Filthy Rich was a hot show." The network scrambled to find a place on the fall schedule for the show, ultimately opting to bump the new series Mama Malone off the schedule altogether.

Although viewers initially tuned in, the series fared poorly with critics. Associated Press writer Fred Rothenberg commented in his widely circulated review, "It's called Filthy Rich and the slant is more toward the former than the latter."

Burke was pressured to maintain a slender figure while working on the show, for which she began taking methamphetamine. It had the side effect of paranoia and making her lapse into unconsciousness. Slim Pickens, who played Big Guy Beck in the pilot, underwent five hours of surgery to remove a brain tumor the day after the show's premiere. He did not return to the show and was replaced by Forrest Tucker.

In the early weeks of September, scripts hadn't been completed for any episodes of the fall season, which began on September 26. Bloodworth wrote scripts with the assistance of former Jimmy Carter speechwriter E. Jack Kaplan. Filthy Rich returned to the air on Wednesday, October 6 between Alice and Tucker's Witch and opposite Family Ties on NBC, ratings dropped and Filthy Rich ranked #60 in the weekly TV ratings by the end of the month. In November, six weeks into the show's second season, all three series were yanked off the schedule and replaced with The CBS Wednesday Movie. Filthy Rich returned in January 1983 on Monday nights scheduled between Square Pegs and M*A*S*H. Ratings didn't improve. It aired for a month before being pulled from the schedule again. The remaining two episodes aired in June, after the series had officially been canceled.

== Episodes ==
=== Season 1 (1982) ===
No. overall	No. in season	Title	Directed by	Written by	Original release date	Viewers (millions)
1	1	"Pilot – Part 1"	Wes Kenney	Linda Bloodworth-Thomason	August 9, 1982	24.2
At the reading of cryonically frozen family patriarch Big Guy Beck's video-will, the Becks learn that Big Guy had an illegitimate son — used RV dealer Wild Bill Westchester. To make matters even more embarrassing for the Becks, they learn that in order to receive their inheritance, they'll have to live "in peace and harmony" with Wild Bill and his "lovely and whimsical" wife, Bootsie, in Toad Hall, the family mansion. Independently wealthy son Stanley and his mother, Big Guy's first wife, Mother B, greets the Westchesters with open arms. However, snobby older son Marshall, his wife, Carlotta, and Big Guy's widow, Kathleen are overwrought with embarrassment and the three scheme to get the Westchesters out of the picture.
2	2	"Pilot – Part 2"	Wes Kenney	Linda Bloodworth-Thomason	August 16, 1982	19.2
Marshall, Carlotta, and Kathleen devise a scheme to disprove Wild Bill's relation to Big Guy — so they drug him and steal a half gallon of his blood to use for testing. But in the end, all it proves is that Wild Bill actually is Big Guy's son.
3	3	"Town and Garden"	Bill Persky	Linda Bloodworth-Thomason	August 23, 1982	21.1
The Becks try to teach the Westchesters proper manners when they learn that a town and garden magazine wants to feature Toad Hall on the cover. But there's still the problem of Mother B. — so Marshall attempts to drug her... but he winds up taking the sleeping pills himself. In the end, Mr. Means decides not to use Toad Hall, instead opting for Mother B.'s nursing home.

=== Season 2 (1982–83) ===
No. overall	No. in season	Title	Directed by	Written by	Original release date	Viewers (millions)
4	1	"Some Like It Not"	Rod Daniel	Linda Bloodworth-Thomason	October 6, 1982	16.5
Marshall, Carlotta and Kathleen scheme to break up the happy Westchester marriage and drive them out of Toad Hall. Their plan has Kathleen seducing Wild Bill, while Marshall makes a move on Bootsie. But the whole plan backfires when Stanley figures out what's going on and has Wild Bill pretend to be smitten with Carlotta.
5	2	"The Kidnapping of Stanley"	Rod Daniel	Linda Bloodworth-Thomason	October 13, 1982	14.0
It's Stanley's 35th birthday and Marshall, Carlotta and Kathleen expect him to get the gift of cash, so naturally they all suck up to him. But instead of cash, a cake arrives with two ladies inside — who kidnap him. It's soon revealed that the kidnapping was arranged by Big Guy so Stanley could find out who his friends really are — his "friends" being whichever family members come up with the ransom. Needless to say that Marshall, Carlotta, and Kathleen aren't his friends... Meanwhile Wild Bill and Bootsie work feverishly and valiantly to come up with the cash, but it's Mother B. who saves the day (with cash she picked from the money tree that Big Guy left her).
6	3	"The Real Men"	Rod Daniel	Linda Bloodworth-Thomason	October 20, 1982	14.2
In an attempt to prove himself to Carlotta, Marshall takes out a huge loan — unaware that he's borrowing the money from a gangster. Marshall flaunts his newfound wealth... then loses it to one of Mother B's friends in a poker game.
7	4	"The Happy Medium"	Rod Daniel	Jim Brecher	October 27, 1982	11.9
Bootsie's sudden interest in the occult finds Carlotta scrambling to arrange a phony séance to contact Big Guy's spirit, who tells the Westchesters to give up their inheritance and leave Toad Hall. The schemers are exposed, Marshall, Kathleen and Carlotta are foiled once again (and they leave arguing about the scheme's failure), and Stanley convinces Wild Bill and Bootsie that they will always have a home at Toad Hall, whether Marshall, Carlotta, and Kathleen like it or not.
8	5	"Take This Job and Love It – Part 1"	Rod Daniel	Linda Bloodworth-Thomason	November 3, 1982	12.4
The latest installment of Big Guy's video will includes a promise of a $10,000 bonus for the family member who finds work and gets the best report. Marshall and Wild Bill get jobs at an RV dealership, Carlotta becomes a tour guide, Bootsie starts a fingernail and underwear franchise, and Kathleen receives promotion after promotion at the State Bank. It's smooth sailing until Bootsie reveals that she's set up an in-home presentation on the same night that the Southern 500 Committee is scheduled to arrive for a dinner meeting regarding Marshall and Carlotta's failure to pay their annual dues.
9	6	"Take This Job and Love It – Part 2"	Rod Daniel	Linda Bloodworth-Thomason	November 10, 1982	10.5
Members of the Southern 500 Committee arrive for a meeting with Marshall and Carlotta on the same evening that Bootsie is hosting an in-home presentation for a fingernail and underwear franchise that she's started. The festivities get off to a rocky start when Carlotta, who fell into the river at her job on Mud Island as "an interpreter of the language of salty sea captains", is forced to wear her work clothes (a hoop skirt) to the party. Further complications ensue when Wild Bill burns dinner, forcing Bootsie's party into the adjoining room (though her sole guest is homeless Alvin Essary) and Mother B. arrives to liven things up.
10	7	"The Country Club"	Rod Daniel	Linda Bloodworth-Thomason	January 17, 1983	13.1
The snobby Beck trio are horrified when Stanley arrives at the country club with Bootsie and Wild Bill. But what happens next horrifies them even more: Bootsie and Bill decide to join the country club, with Stanley as their sponsor! In an attempt to discredit the Westchesters, Carlotta sets up a meeting with the admissions committee and encourages the Westchesters to be themselves. She and Marshall pick out the tackiest clothes in the Westchester closet, and invite wino Alvin Essary to speak on behalf of the Westchesters. But Stanley intervenes, making the rest of the Becks look like fools when Essary and the Westchesters arrive dressed and acting like royalty. The result is the Westchesters are accepted in the Country Club, while Marshall and Carlotta, due to a scheme to pocket money using phony foster children, are placed on probation, which leads Carlotta to moan "They're IN, and we're OUT!".
11	8	"A Beck Goes Back"	Rod Daniel	E. Jack Kaplan	January 24, 1983	12.5
When Carlotta is nominated to be vice president of the Dames of the Confederacy, her rival nominee, Sissy Chastaine, gives Carlotta a most difficult charity to complete in order to stay in the running — the high school equivalency test drive. Carlotta is determined to win the nomination, but has no idea how to complete her charity drive, until Bootsie reveals she does not have her high school diploma. Bootsie offers her help to Carlotta and Marshall, who repel her every effort. Finally, Stanley, Wild Bill and Bootsie (who has been preparing to take her exam by reading the entire Encyclopædia Britannica — except the "z"s) come up with the perfect plan to help — make giant billboards of Bootsie wearing her mortar board and holding a diploma under the heading: "A Beck goes Back!" [to school]. Carlotta, Marshall, and Kathleen are horrified, and, armed with paint and brushes, go around town blocking out the Beck name. Caught in the act, the snobs are arrested for defacing public property. When Carlotta returns home after spending a night in jail, she receives a phone call from Sissy Chastaine. Sissy tells Carlotta that the equivalency test drive was a huge success. Carlotta is thrilled, believing she has won the nomination, until Sissy tells her that due to her now criminal record, (her night of vandalism) she is disqualified.
12	9	"The Treasure of Toad Hall"	Rod Daniel	E. Jack Kaplan	January 31, 1983	16.1
When Bootsie discovers a Civil War diary which documents hidden gold in the mansion, Marshall and Carlotta quickly concoct a scheme to keep Bootsie from telling the rest of the family.
13	10	"The Blue and the Gray for the Green"	Wes Kenney	Linda Bloodworth-Thomason & E. Jack Kaplan	February 14, 1983	12.9
The Becks are delighted when they learn that Toad Hall is regarded as a historical site, thus entitling them to tax exemption. However, what the snobs don't anticipate is that as a historical site, they are required by law to conduct tours of the family mansion, something they are not too thrilled about.
14	11	"The First Heir"	Rod Daniel	Barry E. Blitzer & Linda Bloodworth-Thomason	June 8, 1983	7.0
When it's revealed that there's a large inheritance waiting for the first Beck grandchild, Marshall, Carlotta and Kathleen begin to scheme. Kathleen takes the opportunity to try to seduce Stanley yet again, which he deflects as usual. Marshall and Carlotta, on the other hand, decide to adopt a child, thinking that an adopted child would still be a Beck grandchild (George later told them that would not be the case). Afraid that Bootsie will become pregnant before the adoption can be completed, the trio decide to keep the Westchesters apart — Kathleen and Carlotta have slumber parties with Bootsie while Marshall keeps Wild Bill awake, telling him of his problems. Eventually, it's revealed that Bootsie is unable to get pregnant, though she and Wild Bill have tried. Upon hearing this, and receiving a phone call that their application for adoption was denied, a truly furious Carlotta banishes Marshall out of their bedroom into a tent in the hallway.
15	12	"The Best Revenge Is Stealing Your Ex-Husband's Second Wife's Fiance"	Rod Daniel	Linda Bloodworth-Thomason	June 15, 1983	8.0
Gold-digging Kathleen finds herself engaged to a rich old timer and the wedding's just days away. Marshall and Carlotta are excited by this news because, by getting remarried, Kathleen forfeits her claim on Big Guy's money. Kathleen sees this as her last opportunity to seduce Stanley who rings a fire alarm to scare her off. But Kathleen's giddiness turns to despair when her fiance announces that he's in love with Mother B., just moments before they are to be wed.

== Ratings ==
Season	Episodes	Start date	End date	Nielsen rank	Nielsen rating
1981–82	3	August 9, 1982	August 23, 1982	N/A	N/A
1982–83	12	October 6, 1982	June 15, 1983	72	N/A
