= Priscilla Weems =

American-born actress and singer (born 1972)

- Born: January 18, 1972 (age 54); Eugene, Oregon
- Occupations: Actress, singer
- Children: 1

Priscilla Weems (born January 18, 1972) is an American-born actress and singer.

Weems started acting at an early age, and was on the first two seasons of Five Mile Creek. Later, she had a recurring role as Claudia Marie Shively, on Designing Women. She also guest-starred on several shows, including Quantum Leap, The Garry Shandling Show and St. Elsewhere.

Weems left acting to get married and have a son. Her marriage ended in divorce and she later returned to the entertainment industry as a singer.
