= Richard Gilliland =

American actor (1950–2021)

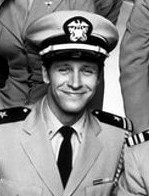
- Gilliland in a promotional photo for Operation Petticoat
- Born: January 23, 1950; Fort Worth, Texas, U.S.
- Died: March 18, 2021 (aged 71); Los Angeles, California, U.S.
- Years active: 1974–2021
- Spouse: Jean Smart (m. 1987)
- Children: 2

Richard Morris Gilliland (January 23, 1950 – March 18, 2021) was an American television and movie actor, best known as JD Shackleford in Designing Women (1986–1992).

== Life and career ==
Gilliland was born in Fort Worth, Texas, to parents Richard Velton Gilliland and Betty Gene née Morris Gilliland. He attended Shawnee Mission South High School in Overland Park, Kansas, graduating in 1968. He was active in plays and musicals. He studied drama at the University of Kansas for two years before transferring to the Goodman School of Drama in Chicago. He left school his final year to become a member of the Chicago Free Street Theater. He joined the cast of Godspell in Chicago first as a disciple and then in the leading role before moving to Los Angeles in 1973.

Gilliland first appeared onscreen in the 1970s. His notable appearances include McMillan, Thirtysomething, Party of Five, Little Women, and a recurring role on Designing Women where he met actress Jean Smart, who starred as Charlene in that series. On Designing Women he played J. D. Shackelford, the boyfriend of Annie Potts' character Mary Jo Shively. He and Smart married in 1987. They have two sons, Connor Douglas (born 1989) and Forrest who was adopted from China in May 2009.

He played Ellis Kapp on The Unit and Captain Stan Cotter on 24 during season five, while his wife Jean Smart played First Lady Martha Logan in the same season. He also had a recurring role as serial killer Jeffrey Speidel in the NBC series Matlock.

He died following a short illness in Los Angeles, California, on March 18, 2021, at the age of 71.

== Select TV and filmography ==
- The Streets of San Francisco (1974) (TV series)
- Bug (1975)
- Stay Hungry (1976)
- McMillan (1976–77) (TV series)
- The White Buffalo (1977)
- Operation Petticoat (1977–78) (TV series)
- Little Women (1978) (TV miniseries)
- The Waltons (1981) (TV series)
- Airplane II: The Sequel (1982)
- The Night the Bridge Fell Down (1983) (TV movie)
- Just Our Luck (1983) (TV series)
- Challenge of a Lifetime (1985) (TV movie)
- The Love Boat (1985) (TV series)
- Mary (1986) (TV series)
- Designing Women (1986–91) (TV series)
- Hunter (1987) (TV series)
- Police Story: Monster Manor (1988) as Mike
- Heartland (1989) (TV series)
- Thirtysomething (1989–90) (TV series)
- Murder, She Wrote (1991, 93) (TV series)
- Matlock (1991, '93, '95) (TV series)
- Winnetka Road (1994) (TV series)
- Touched by an Angel (1996) (TV series)
- Dark Skies (1996–97) (TV series)
- Early Edition (1997) (TV series)
- Star Kid (1997)
- Brooklyn South (1998) (TV series)
- The Practice (1998) (TV series)
- Party of Five (1997, '98) (TV series)
- Judging Amy (2000) (TV series)
- Becker (2001) (TV series)
- Vampire Clan (2002)
- Joan of Arcadia (2003) (TV series)
- Crossing Jordan (2004) (TV series)
- 24 (2006) (TV series)
- The Unit (2007) (TV series)
- Dexter (2009) (TV series)
- Desperate Housewives (2010) (TV series)
- Torchwood (2011) (TV series)
- Imposters (2017–18) (TV series)
- Case 347 (2020) (Movie)
