= Delta Burke =

American actress, producer and author (born 1956)

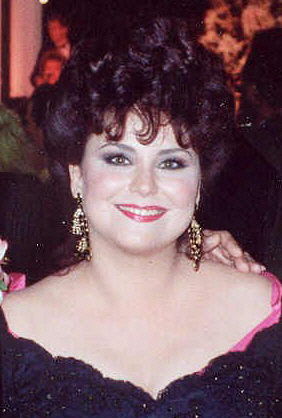
- Burke at the 1990 Emmy Awards
- Born: July 30, 1956 (age 69); Orlando, Florida, U.S.
- Occupations: Actress; producer; author
- Years active: 1974–present
- Known for: Designing Women; Delta; Filthy Rich
- Spouse: Gerald McRaney (m. 1989)

Delta Burke (born July 30, 1956) is an American actress, producer and author. From 1986 to 1991, she starred as Suzanne Sugarbaker in the CBS sitcom Designing Women, for which she received two Emmy Award nominations for Outstanding Lead Actress in a Comedy Series.

Burke's other television credits include Filthy Rich (1982–83), Delta (1992–93), Women of the House (1995) and DAG (2000–01). She has produced and starred in made-for-TV movies, appeared in the film What Women Want (2000), and had a recurring guest role in the drama series Boston Legal (2006–07). She has also starred in the Broadway productions of Thoroughly Modern Millie (2003) and Steel Magnolias (2005).

== Early life and Miss Florida ==
Burke was born on July 30, 1956, in Orlando, Florida to a single mother, Jean. Frederick Burke, an Orlando realtor, adopted her after marrying her mother. Burke has never met her biological father. She has two younger siblings, Jonathan and Jennifer.

Burke graduated from Colonial High School in 1974 and won the senior superlative "Most Likely to Succeed." In 1972, she won the Miss Flame crown from the Orlando Fire Department and became Miss Flame for the state. In her senior year of high school, she won the Miss Florida title for 1974, and she was the youngest titleholder in pageant history. Burke won a talent scholarship from the Miss America Organization, allowing her to attend a two-year study program at the London Academy of Music and Dramatic Art.

== Career ==
=== Early career ===
In 1974, as part of winning Miss Florida, Burke appeared on the ABC television show Bozo the Clown, filmed in Orlando. A 2001 episode of Lost Treasures of NFL Films contains film footage of her appearance as Miss Florida at the World Football League's World Bowl that same year.

In 1980, Burke portrayed the role of the second Bonnie Sue Chisholm in the CBS western miniseries The Chisholms. She spent a year on Filthy Rich in 1982 playing wily young widow Kathleen Beck. After that, she played football-team owner Diane Barrow on 1st & Ten from 1984 to 1986.

=== Designing Women ===
In 1986, Burke left 1st and Ten when she was cast as Suzanne Sugarbaker in the CBS sitcom Designing Women, a show created by Linda Bloodworth-Thomason, who had previously cast Burke in her show Filthy Rich. The show was set at an interior design firm in Atlanta headed by four women, and Burke was one of the show's four female leads. (Dixie Carter, another of the leads, had been the lead actress on Filthy Rich.) The show struggled in the ratings and was briefly canceled after its first year, but in 1989 began to receive respectable ratings after being paired with the sitcom Murphy Brown. Burke became the show's breakout star and earned two consecutive nominations for the Primetime Emmy Award for Outstanding Lead Actress in a Comedy Series in 1990 and 1991. She was the only lead female cast member of the show to be nominated.

In 1990, Burke publicly expressed dissatisfaction with the show during a televised interview with Barbara Walters and in interviews with other media outlets. She asserted on Entertainment Tonight that there was a labor dispute and that actors were often forced to work more than 15 hours per day, with executives even blocking the doors to keep actors on set. She also said that Carter, who had once been her close friend and maid of honor at her wedding to Gerald McRaney, was not speaking to her, as Carter sided with her bosses. At the end of the fifth season of Designing Women in 1991, Burke was fired from the show as a result of her contentious relations with Carter and Bloodworth-Thomason.

=== 1990s ===
Burke was given her own vehicle with the sitcom Delta in 1992, in which she portrayed an aspiring country music singer. She dyed her hair blonde for the role. When ratings plummeted, Burke became a brunette again. The series was canceled after one season. In 1995, Burke and Bloodworth-Thomason reconciled their differences, and Burke returned as Suzanne Sugarbaker in the Designing Women spinoff Women of the House (1995), but the show failed after one season.

It took more than a decade for Burke and Carter to reconcile, but Burke guest-starred on an episode of Family Law, a show on which Carter was a regular cast member.

=== Weight issues ===
Since the early 1990s, Burke's weight has been a subject of discussion in the tabloid press. Her struggles with weight, depression and eating disorders stretch back to her pageant days in the early 1970s. She became a much-parodied figure because of frequent media coverage about her weight, including a sketch on Saturday Night Live. In 1989, Burke asked Bloodworth-Thomason to write a Designing Women episode addressing her weight. In the "They Shoot Fat Women, Don't They?" episode, Suzanne Sugarbaker attends her 15-year high-school reunion and her feelings are hurt after hearing disparaging remarks about her weight. Her performance on this episode is believed to have led to her first Emmy nomination.

=== Later career ===
Burke has been a leading actress in a number of television films and had a supporting role in the Mel Gibson film What Women Want (2000).

In the early 2000s, she costarred with David Alan Grier on the sitcom DAG. She had lost much of her excess weight for the role after being diagnosed with diabetes.

Burke made her Broadway debut in September 2003 when she starred as Mrs. Meers in the musical Thoroughly Modern Millie. She was the third actress to play the role in the production after Harriet Harris and Terry Burrell. She played the role until February 2004 before being succeeded by her Designing Women costar Carter. Burke then played the role of Truvy in the original Broadway production of Steel Magnolias, playing the role for the show's entire four-month run from April 4—July 31, 2005.

Burke played Bella Horowitz during a five-episode Season 3 arc on Boston Legal as a former flame of William Shatner's character Denny Crane. She appeared in the Hallmark Channel film Bridal Fever, which aired on February 2, 2008.

In March 2012, Burke was cast in the ABC comedy pilot Counter Culture. However, after Burke fell while on set, production of the pilot was suspended and the show did not become a series.

== Personal life ==
Burke has been married to actor Gerald McRaney since May 28, 1989. They have no children together, although McRaney has adult children from his prior marriages. Burke and McRaney's primary residence is in Los Angeles, California, and they own homes in Telluride, Colorado and New Orleans.

Burke is a supporter of gay rights, and has worked with openly gay playwright and screenwriter Del Shores on many occasions, in Sordid Lives and Southern Baptist Sissies. In 2006, Burke and openly gay Tennessee actor Leslie Jordan were uninvited from the Nashville talk show Talk of the Town after the show's managing director decided that the subject matter would offend conservative viewers. Burke first became attached to the cause when attending acting school in London.

Burke is a designer and manager of the clothing company Delta Burke Design, headquartered in New York City. She and McRaney also own an antiques store in Collins, Mississippi.

Burke has been diagnosed with type 2 diabetes and has compulsive hoarding syndrome, for which she has received therapy. She said: "At one time I had 27 storage units. I don't have a big enough house! My mom had it, it's my mother's fault. She saved the diaper I came home from the hospital in!"

== Filmography ==
Film and Television
Year	Title	Role	Notes
1978	Zuma Beach	Terri	Uncredited
1979	The Seekers	Elizabeth Fletcher Kent	TV miniseries
1979	Charleston	Stella Farrell	TV movie
1979	A Last Cry for Help	Carol	TV movie
1980	The Chisholms	Bonnie Sue Chisholm	TV miniseries
1980	The Misadventures of Sheriff Lobo	Diane Stone	Episode: "The Haunting of Orly Manor"
1981	Nero Wolfe	Jean Wellmann	Episode: "Murder by the Book"
1981	The Fall Guy	Cantina Waitress	Episode: "The Fall Guy"
1982	Rooster	Laura DeVega	TV movie
1982	The Fall Guy	Bryna	Episode: "Mighty Myron"
1982–1983	Filthy Rich	Kathleen Beck	15 episodes
1983	Johnny Blue	Joanne Kruger	TV pilot episode
1983	Fantasy Island	Gloria Ransom	Episode: "The Devil Stick/Touch and Go"
1983	Murder Me, Murder You	Paula Corey	TV movie
1983	Gun Shy	Clementine	Episode: "Mail Order Mommy"
1983	Remington Steele	Nancy Stinson Dannon	Episode: "Altared Steele"
1983–1984	The Love Boat	Andrea Sheppard	3 episodes
1984	Automan	Rachel Innis	Episode: "Unreasonable Facsimile"
1984	Mike Hammer	Linda Sloane	"Shots in the Dark"
1984	T. J. Hooker	Diana Polnoi	Episode: "Grand Theft Auto"
1984–1988	1st & Ten	Diane Barrow	29 episodes
1985	Who's the Boss?	Diane Wilmington	Episode: "Paint Your Wagon"
1985	A Bunny's Tale	Margie	TV movie
1986–1991	Designing Women	Suzanne Sugarbaker	120 episodes
1986	Hotel	Sherry	Episode: "Restless Nights"
1987	Simon & Simon	Christy Keating	Episode: "Desperately Seeking Dacody"
1988	Where the Hell's That Gold?	Germany	TV movie
1991	Saturday Night Live	Herself / Host	Episode: "Delta Burke/Chris Isaak"
1991	Love and Curses... And All That Jazz	Desiree	TV movie
1992	Day-O	Grace Connors	TV movie
1992–1993	Delta	Delta Bishop	17 episodes
1994	The Mighty Jungle	Viola (voice)	26 episodes
1994	Diagnosis: Murder	Maggie Donahue / Sister Michael	Episode: "Sister Michael Wants You"
1995	Simon & Simon: In Trouble Again	Mrs. Heiser	TV movie
1995	Women of the House	Suzanne Sugarbaker	13 episodes
1996–2001	Touched by an Angel	Julia Fitzgerald / Diana Winslow	3 episodes
1996	A Promise to Carolyn	Debra	TV movie
1996	Maternal Instincts	Tracy Horton	
1996	Lois & Clark: The New Adventures of Superman	Myrtle Beech	Episode: "Swear to God, This Time We're Not Kidding"
1996	Promised Land	Julia Fitzgerald	Episode: "Homecoming"
1997	Melanie Darrow	Melanie Darrow	TV movie
1998–1999	Any Day Now	Teresa O'Brien	Episodes: "I Feel Awful", "Music from My Life"
1999–2001	Popular	Cherry Cherry	6 episodes
2000	Sordid Lives	Noleta Nethercott	
2000	What Women Want	Eve	
2000–2001	DAG	Judith Whitman	17 episodes
2001	Dangerous Child	Sally Cambridge	TV movie
2002	St. Sass	Billie Lang	TV movie
2002	Family Law	Marcie Dell	Episode: "Ties That Bind"
2002	Hansel & Gretel	Stepmother	
2003	Going For Broke	Laura Bancroft	TV movie
2003	The Designing Women Reunion	Herself	TV special
2003	Good Boy!	Barbara Ann (voice)	
2006	The Year Without a Santa Claus	Mrs. Claus	TV movie
2006–2007	Boston Legal	Bella Horowitz	5 episodes
2007	The Wedding Bells	Sheila Pontell	Episode: "For Whom the Bells Toll"
2008	Bridal Fever	Dahlia Marchand	TV movie
2009	Drop Dead Diva	Tessa Wells	Episode: "Make Me a Match"
2012	Counter Culture	Nonie	TV pilot episode
2019	Dolly Parton's Heartstrings	Ellie Holder	Episode: "If I Had Wings"

== Nonfiction ==
- Delta Style: Eve Wasn't a Size 6 and Neither Am I (1998, St. Martin's Press; ISBN 0-312-15454-2)
