= Harry Thomason =

American film producer

Harry Zell Thomason
- Born: Harry Zell Thomason; November 30, 1940 (age 85); Hampton, Arkansas, U.S.
- Occupations: Film & television director/producer, screenwriter
- Years active: 1983–present

Harry Zell Thomason (born November 30, 1940) is an American film and television producer and director, best known for the television series Designing Women. Thomason and his wife, Linda Bloodworth-Thomason, are close friends of President Bill Clinton and U.S. Secretary of State Hillary Clinton, and played a major role in President Clinton's election campaigns.

== Biography ==
Harry Z. Thomason was born in Hampton, Arkansas, the son of a Southern Baptist deacon. He was a Little Rock, Arkansas, high school science teacher and football coach. He married and divorced Judy Crump, with whom he has a daughter, Stacy.

In 1983, Thomason and his second wife, Linda Bloodworth-Thomason, were married and formed Mozark Productions, the vehicle for several successful television series, including Designing Women, Hearts Afire, and Evening Shade. In 2007, they began production on the HBO series 12 Miles of Bad Road, starring Lily Tomlin.

Thomason was a close friend of Bill Clinton and produced the glowing biographical film, The Man from Hope, the centerpiece of the 1992 Democratic National Convention. Thomason and his partner, Darnell Martens, provided charter air service for the Clinton campaign and served as an image consultant. After Clinton was elected, Thomason became embroiled in the Travelgate scandal. His partner, Martens, reported that he had heard rumors that the White House Travel Office was corrupt and disloyal to the Clintons. This view of the Travel Office was compounded by a series of leaks at the White House that were unfavorable to the Clintons. Thomason began pressing Hillary Clinton to investigate the travel office. When the financial irregularities were discovered, the White House called in the FBI. The resulting firings generated a great deal of negative press coverage and an investigation of the events surrounding it, including Thomason and Martens' air service. Thomason served as co-chairman of the 1992 Presidential Inauguration Committee and once again worked as an image consultant at the beginning of the Lewinsky scandal. Thomason ended up testifying before the Lewinsky Grand Jury.

In 2004, Thomason produced the film documentary version of The Hunting of the President from the book by Joe Conason and Gene Lyons, about political efforts to discredit and defeat Bill and Hillary Clinton. With Nickolas Perry, Thomason was nominated for the Writers Guild of America Award for Best Documentary Screenplay for the film.

== Filmography ==
Film

Title	Director	Producer	Writer
A Shining Season	No	Yes	No
Encounter with the Unknown	Yes	No	Yes
Revenge of Bigfoot	Yes	Yes	No
So Sad About Gloria	Yes	Yes	No
The Day it Came to Earth	Yes	Executive	No
The Designing Women Reunion	Yes	No	No
The Great Lester Boggs	Yes	No	No
The Man from Hope	Yes	No	No
To Find My Son	No	Yes	No
The Hunting of the President	No	Yes	No
The Last Ride	Yes	Yes	No

Television

Title	Director	Producer	Writer
Designing Women	Yes	Executive	No
Emeril	Yes	Executive	No
Evening Shade	Yes	No	No
Hearts Afire	Yes	Executive	Yes
Lime Street	No	Executive	No
The Blue and the Gray	No	Yes	No
The Fall Guy	No	No	Yes
Women of the House	Yes	Executive	No

== Quotes ==
- "When you're in the political realm, you become a public figure, and anything is fair."

Adapted from the article Harry Thomason, from Wikinfo, licensed under the GNU Free Documentation License.
