= Linda Bloodworth-Thomason =

American writer and television producer (born 1947)

- Born: Linda Joyce Bloodworth; April 15, 1947 (age 79); Poplar Bluff, Missouri, U.S.
- Education: University of Missouri
- Occupations: Writer; director; producer
- Spouse: Harry Thomason (m. 1983)

Linda Joyce Bloodworth-Thomason (born April 15, 1947) is an American writer, director, and television producer. She is best known for creating, writing, and producing several television series, most successfully with the sitcoms Designing Women and Evening Shade. She and her husband, Harry Thomason, are also notable for their friendship with former President Bill Clinton, and the role they played in his election campaigns.

== Early life ==
Bloodworth was born in Poplar Bluff, Missouri, United States, the daughter of Ralph and Claudia Bloodworth. She graduated from Poplar Bluff High School. She went on to obtain a Bachelor of Arts degree in English from the University of Missouri in Columbia, Missouri.

In the early 1970s, she moved to Los Angeles, California, where she taught English at Jordan High School, in the south Los Angeles community of Watts.

== Career ==
=== Early career ===
After her teaching stint concluded, Bloodworth went on to work for The Wall Street Journal in advertising. She then became a reporter for the Los Angeles Daily Journal. During this period, she also began working as a freelance writer in television.

Her early script-writing work included five episodes of M*A*S*H – of which one episode, "Hot Lips and Empty Arms", written with Mary Kay Place, was nominated for an Emmy Award – as well as scripts for Rhoda, the television version of Paper Moon, and the original pilot for One Day at a Time. She also wrote scripts for the short-lived sitcoms Paul Sand in Friends and Lovers and Filthy Rich.

=== Creating and producing ===
Bloodworth met Harry Thomason in 1978 and married him in 1983. That same year, the pair created Mozark Productions, named for their respective home states: Missouri, or "MO", and Arkansas, with an allusion to the Ozarks region overlapping both states.

The company produced several situation comedies, most notably the show Designing Women, which reunited Bloodworth-Thomason with Filthy Rich cast members Dixie Carter and Delta Burke. The company also created and produced Evening Shade, Hearts Afire, Women of the House (a short-lived Designing Women spin-off starring Burke), and Emeril (a short-lived sitcom featuring chef Emeril Lagasse). Unfortunately, Emeril was to premiere on September 11, 2001, but was preempted by continuous coverage of the aftermath of the World Trade Center and Pentagon attacks. The premiere of Emeril was delayed by two weeks and was never able to find an audience due to the premiere occurring so close to the attacks, leaving the air after only seven aired episodes after November 2001.

In 1994, she was awarded the Women in Film Lucy Award in recognition of her excellence and innovation in her creative works that have enhanced the perception of women through the medium of television.

In 2018, Bloodworth-Thomason wrote a guest column for The Hollywood Reporter in which she stated that, starting in 1995, then-president of CBS Les Moonves kept her shows off the air for seven years, derailing her career by turning down every pilot she proposed, despite her having what was at the time the largest writing and producing contract in the history of CBS.

=== Other work ===
Her first novel, Liberating Paris, was published in 2004. Variety reported in March 2005 that the Thomasons were working on a screen adaptation of the novel, with actors Michelle Pfeiffer, Billy Bob Thornton, and Dwight Yoakam committed to the film despite there being no completed script. It was one of two film projects that the Thomasons were to produce with Jeff Sagansky, the other being a Bloodworth-Thomason script called Southern Comfort, based on a 2001 documentary of the same name by filmmaker Kate Davis. A new series, 12 Miles of Bad Road, was slated to debut on HBO. The show starred Gary Cole and Lily Tomlin. After six episodes of a proposed ten-episode run were shot, the show was dropped by HBO before being broadcast.

Her documentary Bridegroom premiered at the 2013 Tribeca Film Festival.

In 2015, Bloodworth-Thomason wrote a revised book to a reworked musical version of First Wives Club.

== Friendship with the Clintons ==
The Thomasons' friendship with the Clintons dates to Bill Clinton's days as governor of Arkansas. During the 1992 Democratic Party presidential primaries, they were credited with building support for Clinton in Hollywood donor circles, helping override initial skepticism for his centrist ideology. The couple created several short-subject political promotional films for Clinton and for other candidates, such as General Wesley Clark's presidential bid and Hillary Clinton's run for the United States Senate.
