= Dixie Carter =

American actress (1939–2010)

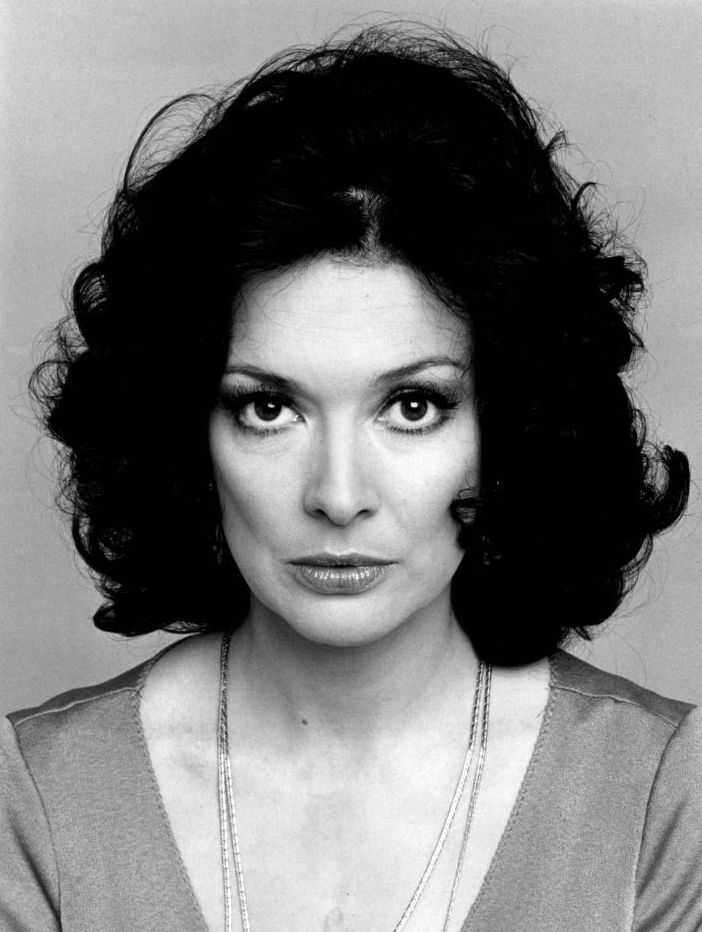
- Carter in 1977
- Born: Dixie Virginia Carter; May 25, 1939; McLemoresville, Tennessee, U.S.
- Died: April 10, 2010 (aged 70); Houston, Texas, U.S.
- Resting place: McLemoresville Cemetery
- Education: Rhodes College, University of Tennessee, Knoxville, University of Memphis
- Occupation: Actress
- Years active: 1960–2009
- Known for: Designing Women; Family Law; Diff'rent Strokes
- Spouses: Arthur L. Carter (m. 1967; div. 1977) George Hearn (m. 1977; div. 1979) Hal Holbrook (m. 1984)
- Children: 2
- Awards: Full list

Dixie Virginia Carter (May 25, 1939 – April 10, 2010) was an American actress. She starred as Julia Sugarbaker on the sitcom Designing Women (1986–1993) and as Randi King on the drama series Family Law (1999–2002). She was nominated for the 2007 Primetime Emmy Award for Outstanding Guest Actress in a Comedy Series for her role as Gloria Hodge on Desperate Housewives (2006–2007).

Carter made her professional stage debut in a Memphis production of the musical Carousel in 1960 and made her Broadway debut in the 1974 musical Sextet. After appearing for two years as District Attorney Brandy Henderson on the CBS soap The Edge of Night (1974–1976), she starred in the 1976 Broadway revival of the musical Pal Joey. Her other television roles included the sitcoms On Our Own (1977–1978), Filthy Rich (1982–1983) and Diff'rent Strokes (1984–1985). She returned to Broadway to play Maria Callas in the play Master Class in 1997 and to play Mrs. Meers in the musical Thoroughly Modern Millie in 2004.

== Early life ==
Dixie Virginia Carter was born May 25, 1939, to Esther Virginia (née Hillsman) and Halbert Leroy Carter in McLemoresville, Tennessee. Carter spent many of her early years in Memphis. She attended the University of Memphis and Rhodes College.

In college, she was a member of the Delta Delta Delta sorority. In 1959, Carter competed in the Miss Tennessee pageant, where she placed first runner-up to Mickie Weyland. Carter won the Miss Volunteer beauty pageant at the University of Tennessee the same year.

== Career ==
In 1960, Carter made her professional stage debut in a Memphis production of Carousel, co-starring George Hearn, whom she would go on to marry 17 years later. She moved to New York City in 1963 and got a part in a production of Shakespeare's The Winter's Tale.

In 1967, she began an eight-year hiatus from acting, to focus on raising her two daughters; she returned to acting in 1974, when she filled in for actress Nancy Pinkerton as Dorian Cramer on One Life to Live while Pinkerton was on maternity leave. She subsequently was cast in the role of Assistant D.A. Olivia Brandeis "Brandy" Henderson on the soap opera The Edge of Night from 1974 to 1976. Carter took the role though some advised her that doing a daytime soap might negatively affect her career. However, she was first noticed in this role, and after leaving Edge of Night in 1977, she appeared in several episodes of another soap opera, The Doctors as socialite Linda Elliott. She relocated from New York to Los Angeles and pursued prime-time television roles. In 1976, she won the Theater World Award for Jesse and the Bandit Queen.

In 1981 Carter starred in the title role of Mame at the Pittsburgh Civic Light Opera in a production staged by Susan H. Schulman and led by conductor Tom Helm.

She appeared in series such as Out of the Blue (as Aunt Marion), On Our Own (as April Baxter), Diff'rent Strokes (as the first Maggie McKinney Drummond, Phillip Drummond's second wife), The Greatest American Hero (playing a KGB spy) and as the stuck up and conniving Carlotta Beck on Filthy Rich (1982).

Carter's appearance in Filthy Rich paved the way for her most notable role, that of sharp tongued liberal interior decorator Julia Sugarbaker in the 1986–1993 television program Designing Women, set in Atlanta. Filthy Rich was created by Linda Bloodworth Thomason, who also created Designing Women. (In the beginning, without knowing the content of the show, Bloodworth-Thomason's only idea was to create a show starring Carter and fellow castmates Delta Burke, Annie Potts and Jean Smart. Filthy Rich also featured fellow Designing Women cast member Delta Burke in its cast.) After much persuasion from creators Linda Bloodworth-Thomason and her husband Harry Thomason, Hal Holbrook, Carter's real-life husband, had a recurring role as attorney Reese Watson. Carter's daughters Ginna and Mary Dixie Carter also had guest star roles as Julia Sugarbaker's nieces Jennifer and Camilla in the episode "The Naked Truth" in 1989.

In 1997, Carter starred as Maria Callas in Terrence McNally's play Master Class. She played the role from January to June. The role previously had been played by Zoe Caldwell and Patti LuPone.

Noted for portraying strong-minded Southern women, Carter provided the voice of Necile in Mike Young Productions' cartoon feature The Life and Adventures of Santa Claus. She was also in the voice cast of My Neighbors the Yamadas, the English language dub of Studio Ghibli's 1999 anime movie of the same.

From 1999 to 2002, she portrayed Randi King on the legal drama Family Law. From 1999 to 2000, she was a cast member on the short-lived sitcom Ladies Man, appearing as a regular on both Ladies Man and Family Law. In 2004, she made a guest appearance on Law & Order: Special Victims Unit, playing a defense attorney named Denise Brockmorton in the episode called "Home", in which she defended the paranoid mother of two children (Diane Venora) who had manipulated her older son to kill the younger son after breaking her home rules.

In 2006–2007, Carter found a resurgence of fame with a new generation of fans portraying Gloria Hodge, Bree Van de Kamp's disturbed (and scheming) mother-in-law on Desperate Housewives. Creator Marc Cherry started in Hollywood as Carter's assistant on the set of Designing Women. Her first and only Emmy Awards nomination was for the 59th Primetime Emmy Awards under the category of Outstanding Guest Actress in a Comedy Series for her role as Gloria Hodge.

Carter gave an interview in 2006 for the feature-length documentary That Guy: The Legacy of Dub Taylor, which received support from Taylor's family and many of Dub's previous coworkers, including Bill Cosby, Peter Fonda, Don Collier, Cheryl Rogers-Barnett and many others. The project was scheduled to have its world premiere at Taylor's childhood hometown of Augusta, Georgia on April 14, 2007.

Her final film was That Evening Sun, which she filmed with her husband Hal Holbrook in East Tennessee in summer 2008. The film, produced by Dogwood Entertainment (a subsidiary of DoubleJay Creative), is based on a short story by William Gay. That Evening Sun premiered at South By Southwest, where it competed for the narrative feature grand jury prize.

== Personal life ==
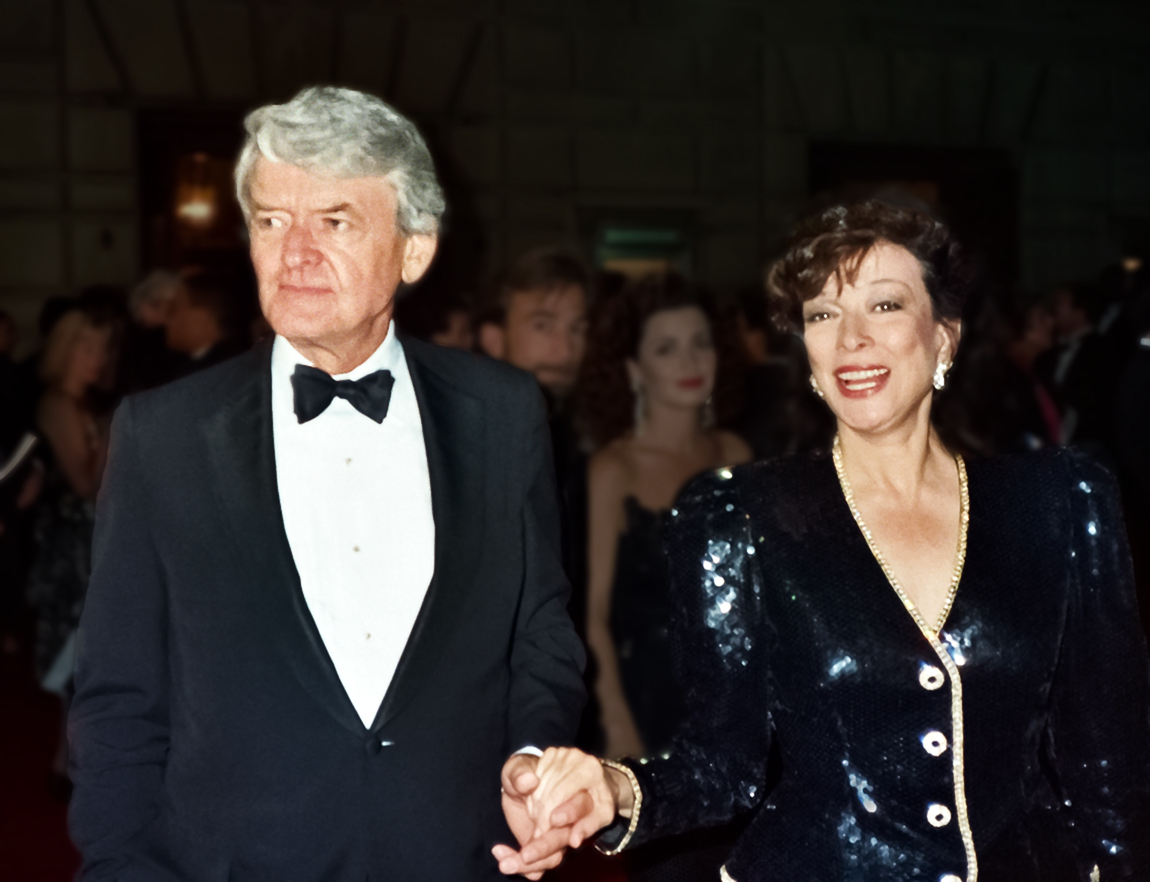
Hal Holbrook and Dixie Carter at the 41st Emmy Awards, Sunday September 17, 1989

In 1967, Carter married Arthur Carter (no relation), businessman and publisher of the New York Observer. Following the birth of their daughters –Mary Dixie (1970) and Ginna (1970)– Carter left acting for eight years to raise the girls with Arthur's three children, Jon, Whendy and Ellen Carter. She divorced Arthur Carter in 1977 and married theater and TV actor George Hearn the same year. Two years later, she and Hearn divorced. She married Hal Holbrook in 1984.

In 1996, Carter published a memoir titled Trying to Get to Heaven, in which she talked frankly about her life with Holbrook, Designing Women and her plastic surgery during the show's run. She acknowledged, along with other celebrities, having used human growth hormone for its antiaging properties.

Carter was a lifelong Methodist and a member of the McLemoresville United Methodist Church.

=== Political views ===
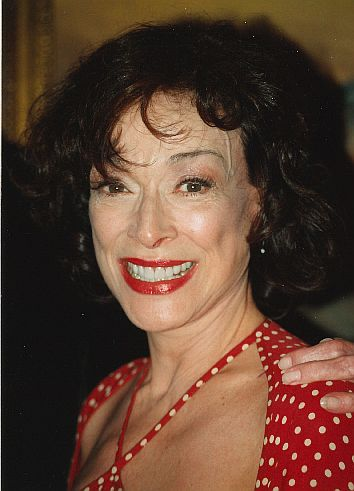
Carter in 2000

Carter was a registered Republican who described her political views as libertarian. She was interviewed by Bill O'Reilly along with Pat Boone at the 2000 Republican National Convention, and once jokingly described herself as "the only Republican in show business". However, Carter's Designing Women character, Julia Sugarbaker, was known for her liberal political views and related speeches, for which she was nicknamed "The Terminator." Carter disagreed with some of her character's beliefs, and made a deal with the show's producers that if Julia delivered a "Terminator" monologue, she would get to sing a song in a future episode. In later years she was also a libertarian Republican who supported civil rights and same-sex marriage.

== Death and legacy ==
On April 10, 2010, Carter died in Houston, at the age of 70, from complications of endometrial cancer. She was interred in McLemoresville, Tennessee.

The Dixie Carter Performing Arts and Academic Enrichment Center (informally called "The Dixie") in Huntingdon, Tennessee, is named in honor of Carter.

A public service announcement made by Carter in 2003 describing and offering outreach to people with spasmodic torticollis/cervical dystonia began appearing in New York and New Jersey and then across the United States in 2010.

== Filmography ==
Year	Title	Role	Notes
1974	One Life to Live	Dorian Lord	Temporary recast
1974–1976	The Edge of Night	D.A. Olivia Brandeis Henderson	Regular role
1977	The Andros Targets	Rita	"The Killing of a Porno Queen"
1977	The Doctors	Dr. Linda Elliott	Regular role
1977–1978	On Our Own	April Baxter	Main role (21 episodes)
1979	Out of the Blue	Marion Richards	Main role (12 episodes)
1980	OHMS	Nora Wing	TV film
1981	The Killing of Randy Webster	Billie Webster	TV film
1982	Cassie & Co.	Evelyn Weller	"The Golden Silence"
1982	Bret Maverick	Hallie McCulloch	"Hallie"
1982	Best of the West	Mae Markham	"The Pretty Prisoner"
1982	Quincy, M.E.	Dr. Alicia Ranier	"The Face of Fear"
1982	The Greatest American Hero	Samantha O'Neill	"Lilacs, Mr. Maxwell"
1982	Lou Grant	Jessica Lindner	"Suspect"
1982–1983	Filthy Rich	Carlotta Beck	Main role (15 episodes)
1983	Going Berserk	Angela	Feature film
1984–1985	Diff'rent Strokes	Maggie McKinney Drummond	Regular role (27 episodes)
1986–1993	Designing Women	Julia Sugarbaker	Main role (163 episodes)
1987	Rosie	Nancy Barker	Episode: "Valentine of Life"
1994	A Perry Mason Mystery: The Case of the Lethal Lifestyle	Louise Archer	TV film
1994	Gambler V: Playing for Keeps	Lillie Langtry	TV film
1994	Christy	Julia Huddleston	"The Sweetest Gift"
1995	Dazzle	Lydie Kilkullen	TV film
1995	Diagnosis: Murder	D.A. Patricia Purcell	"Murder in the Courthouse"
1996	Gone in the Night	Ann Dowaliby	TV film
1997	Fired Up	Rita	"Honey, I Shrunk the Turkey", "The Mother of All Gwens"
1999	My Neighbors the Yamadas	Lady #1 (voice)	Animated feature film
1999	The Big Day	Carol	Feature film
1999–2000	Ladies Man	Peaches	Recurring role (9 episodes)
1999–2002	Family Law	Randi King	Main role (68 episodes)
2000	The Life & Adventures of Santa Claus	Necile (voice)	Direct-to-video
2003	The Designing Women Reunion	Herself	TV special
2003	Comfort and Joy	Frederica	TV film
2004	Law & Order: Special Victims Unit	Denise Brockmorton	"Home"
2005	Hope & Faith	Joyce Shanowski	"A Room of One's Own"
2006–2007	Desperate Housewives	Gloria Hodge	Recurring role (7 episodes)
2008	Our First Christmas	Evie Baer	TV film
2009	That Evening Sun	Ellen Meecham	Feature film (final role)

== Awards and nominations ==
Year	Award	Category	Series or Play	Result
1976	Theatre World Award	Outstanding Actress	Jesse and the Bandit Queen	Won
1979	Drama Desk Award	Drama Desk Award for Outstanding Actress in a Play	Fathers and Sons	Nominated
1989	Los Angeles Women in Film Festival	Excellence in TV Episodic Comedy	Designing Women	Won
2007	Emmy Awards	Outstanding Guest Actress in a Comedy Series	Desperate Housewives	Nominated
2009	SXSW Film Festival	Best Ensemble Cast	That Evening Sun	Won
