= Tomica Hero: Rescue Fire =

- Tomica Hero: Rescue Fire title card from episode 10
- Genre: Tokusatsu
- Created by: Takara Tomy
- Written by: Takashi Yamada; Yoshimi Narita; Yasushi Hirano; Itaru Era; Mitsutaka Hirota; Mio Inoue
- Directed by: Akira Iwamoto; Hideki Oka; Kenzo Maihara; Junya Morita; Daishi Matsunaga; Toshimitsu Chimura; Yuichi Abe; Yoka Kusano
- Starring: Sho Kubo; Yu Kawada; Yu Nakamura; Kazuki Fukuyama; Masanori Mizuno; Masataka Fujishige; Shizuka Nakamura
- Voices of: Daisuke Gōri; Daisuke Kirii; Akeno Watanabe; Susumu Chiba; Chafurin; Reiko Takagi
- Opening theme: "Rescue Fire" by JAM Project "Baku-Chin Kan-Ryo! Rescue Fire" by JAM Project
- Ending theme: "BURNING HERO" by Rey "Rescue Taisō" by Hiroshi Kitadani
- Composer: Toshihiko Sahashi
- Country of origin: Japan
- No. of episodes: 51

Production
- Running time: 22

Original release
- Network: TV Aichi; TV Tokyo
- Release: April 4, 2009 – March 27, 2010

Related
- Tomica Hero: Rescue Force

Tomica Hero: Rescue Fire (トミカヒーロー レスキューファイアー, Tomika Hīrō Resukyū Faiā) is a Japanese tokusatsu television series based on Takara Tomy's Tomica toy car line. A sequel to Tomica Hero: Rescue Force, Rescue Fire tells of another branch of the United Fire-Defense Agency that helps save people from Super-Fire created by demons seeking to make people suffer. This series marks the beginning as well as an end of a program franchise dubbed the Tomica Hero Series. The Tomica Hero story was concluded in the special stage production Nissan Haul Special Live Stage FINAL that featured the return of Obuchi, a new R4, and the return of the original R4, This would be the last tokusatsu production Takara Tomy would take partnership in, until Girls × Heroine in 2017.

== Characters ==
=== The United Fire-Defense Agency/Rescue Fire ===
The Rescue Fire (レスキューファイアー, Resukyū Faiā) team is a newly formed special team called the Super-Fire Specialist Team (超火災特化部隊, Chōkasai Tokka Butai) in the United Fire-Defense Agency (世界消防庁, Sekai Shōbō Chō) or "UFDA", the organization behind the Rescue Force team. The Rescue Force team was sent overseas and is currently based in the Europe branch. The Rescue Fire team disbanded temporarily after the final battle in the last episode, only to be reassembled a year later. The artificial satellite Rescue Eye (レスキューアイ, Resukyū Ai) detects a Super-Fire. The Rescue Fire team is normally stationed at the Fire Phoenix (ファイアーフェニックス, Faiā Fenikkusu) in Tateishi City (楯石シティ, Tateishi Shiti). The Fire Phoenix can switch from Fortress Mode (フォートレスモード, Fōtoresu Mōdo) to flying Space Mode (スペースモード, Supēsu Mōdo) and assumes Spiral Highway (スパイラルハイウェイ, Supairaru Haiwei) when launching the Rescue Dashes. The Fire Phoenix Space Mode's Final Rescue is Freezing Cannon (フリージングキャノン, Furījingu Kyanon) which fires twin icy balls at the enemy to freeze them before a Phoenix Crash (フェニックスクラッシュ, Fenikkusu Kurasshu).

- Tatsuya Homura/Fire-1 (炎 タツヤ／ファイアー1, Homura Tatsuya/Faiā Wan): The rookie member of Rescue Fire, donning an orange suit. His parents were fire fighters who died when he was age 6 around Christmas time, placed in the custody of relatives for two difficult years before enrolling in Himawari School, where he learned to smile from Mie. After graduation, Tatsuya became a fire fighter prior to joining the Rescue Fire team. Though a skilled member and has a burning "Rescue Soul", he is not nearly as professional as his teammates, and tends to get in trouble for his tomfoolery. He loves eating anything with ketchup on it and is a recycler by nature. After the final battle in the last episode, taking Donkaen's words to heart, he travels the world with Q-suke in a soul search to honor of vow to protect the Earth. He can utilize kung-fu in his attacks Whirlwind Kick (旋風キック, Senpū Kikku) and Dragon Kick (ドラゴンキック, Doragon Kikku). With the X-Basher, Fire-1 powers up into Fire-1 X (ファイアー1X, Faiā Wan Ekusu).
- Yuma Megumi/Fire-2 (恵 ユウマ／ファイアー2, Megumi Yūma/Faiā Tsū): The emergency medical expert of Rescue Fire, donning a silver suit. His lineage was the Megumi hikeshi. Wanting to be a fire fighter, he promised he would be the best fire fighter to Jiro. Yuma displays a blatant crush on Tama-chan, though his affections have not been returned until the Christmas incident. He later took the most damage when the Commanders made a last-ditch attack on the Rescue Fire team. He was given the Pearl of Faith before it saved his live when he almost flat-lined. After the final battle in the last episode, he marries Tama-chan and joins a volunteer fire corps. Using the Break Axe, he can execute the Axe Storm (アックスストーム, Akkusu Sutōmu) attack. He also uses the Tri-Basher in Gun Mode to execute the Circle Shot (サークルショット, Sākuru Shotto) attack.
- Ritsuka Yuki/Fire-3 (雪 リツカ／ファイアー3, Yuki Ritsuka/Faiā Surī): The female member of Rescue Fire called "Miss Perfect", donning a green suit. Her father was a top rescuer who died during a Super-Disaster. She left the country and trained in America before joining the Rescue Fire team. She likes animals and has a good knowledge of animals. Though curious as to why someone like Tatsuya is a member of the team, she begins to slowly realize the reason behind it and open up to her teammates. While hospitalized, before the final battle, Tatsuya gives her the Pearl of Purity. After the final battle in the last episode, she serves as a training instructress of the UFDA.
- Tsubasa Aoi/Fire-4 (葵 ツバサ／ファイアー4, Aoi Tsubasa/Faiā Fō): A member of the Rescue Fire's Sky Team (スカイチーム, Sukai Chīmu), donning a black suit. He attended an American university prior to joining the UFDA, being Ritsuka's rival with the intent on outdoing her under the impression she was Fire-1. But after seeing someone with less experience than her is Fire-1, Tsubasa refuses to acknowledge Tatsuya's abilities. Although he still considers Ritsuka his rival, he realizes his feelings for her, yet is always interrupted when he is about to confess. While hospitalized, before the final battle, Tatsuya gives him the Pearl of Love. After the final battle, Tsubasa serves as good publicity for the UFDA.
- Jun Watari/Fire-5 (航 ジュン／ファイアー5, Watari Jun/Faiā Faibu): A member of the Sky Team, donning a light blue suit. He wears plain glasses. While hospitalized, before the final battle, Tatsuya gives him the Pearl of Joy. After the final battle, he joins the helicopter unit of Tokyo Fire Department and serves as the captain of the unit.
- Riku Taiga (大河 リク, Taiga Riku): The captain of the Rescue Fire, using that title to become a test subject in the development of Fire Suits 1–5, eventually becoming unable to don his own Fire Suit. His parents in Hokkaido run a livestock farm. After the final battle in the last episode, he serves as a seminar instructor of the UFDA.
- Tamami Sugiyama (杉山 タマミ, Sugiyama Tamami): A cafeteria worker nicknamed Tama-chan (タマちゃん), she researches many dishes to make ideal food that makes people happy. Her parents in Nagoya City run a restaurant. After the final battle in the last episode, she marries Yuma.
- Reiji Osakabe (刑部 零次, Osakabe Reiji): The director of the United Fire-Defense Agency, also known as R0 (R0, Āru Zero). When the X-Dragon is complete, Osakabe personally helped Tatsuya rekindle his Rescue Soul so he could pilot it.
- Bunji Saeki (佐伯 文治, Saeki Bunji): The head of United Fire-Defense Agency's vehicle maintenance, first introducing himself to Tatsuya while getting the medium Rescue Force Vehicles ready from their transfer to the Europe branch. He later finished repairs on the Rescue Striker after its destruction by Kanitanken.
- Ritsuko Kanzaki (神崎 律子, Kanzaki Ritsuko): The chief of the UFDA's Technology Development Organization (技術開発局, Gijutsu Kaihatsu Kyoku). At present she is working with the Rescue Force at the Europe branch and came to Japan to see if the Rescue Fire team can properly form the Great Wyvern.

==== Allies ====
- Naoshi Taiga (大河 直司, Taiga Naoshi): An archaeologist and Riku and Marimo's older brother, his hobby is to develop original tools while running the Taiga Archaeology Lab. He took orders from Osakabe and found out the slate about the Jakaen and the Ryudouken inside a pyramid in Egypt. Once acquiring it, he brought the tablet to Japan.
- Asuka Taiga (大河 飛鳥, Taiga Asuka): Riku and Marimo's niece and Naoshi's daughter and assistant, she carries a pendant with a blue stone given by the elder in Mongolia that reawakes water dragons of the five Blue Pearls connected to the Ryudouken used to seal Donkaen.
- Tatsugoro Megumi (恵 タツゴロウ, Megumi Tatsugorō; 4, 11, 38, 50-51): Yuma's father who is the foreman of a construction worker.
- Yoshie Megumi (恵 ヨシエ, Megumi Yoshie; 4, 38, 50-51): Yuma's mother who runs the Megumiya (め組屋) monjayaki restaurant.
- Jiro (ジロウ, Jirō; 4, 11, 51): Yuma's friend who is a construction worker and took Yuma's place in becoming the best at his company. He has a son named Teppei (テッペイ, Teppei; 4).
- Mie (ミエ, Mie; 13, 25, 37-38, 45, 47-48, 51): Tatsuya's childhood friend from the Himawari School (ひまわり学園, Himawari Gakuen; Sunflower School) orphanage. When he meets her again, she has become a teacher at the school. She eventually becomes engaged to Tatsuya's dismay before he finally accepted it.
- Rescue Force (レスキューフォース, Resukyū Fōsu): The team created to protect human lives from various disasters too extreme for normal rescue workers. By the time of Rescue Fire's formation, the Rescue Force team is transferred to the Europe branch. They fought a Super-Fire caused by Sakaen in London, eventually returning to Japan to help the Rescue Fire team out.
  - Hikaru Todoroki/R1 (轟 輝／R1, Todoroki Hikaru/Āru Wan; 37-38, 43-44): The last remaining member of the Rescue Force team before being transferred to Europe. He can assume the form of R1 Max (R1マックス, Āru Wan Makkusu).
  - R2 (R2, Āru Tsū; 37): A male member.
  - R3 (R3, Āru Surī; 37): A female member.
  - R4 (R4, Āru Fō; 37): A female member.
  - Eiji Ishiguro/R5 (石黒 鋭二／R5, Ishiguro Eiji/Āru Faibu; 18, 37-38): The leader of Rescue Force. Like the rest of his team, he is transferred to the Europe branch, welcoming Taiga during his visit.
- Tetsunosuke Ikeya (池家 哲之助, Ikeya Tetsunosuke; 21): A former training instructor of the UFDA who runs the Beach House Tetchan (海のいえてっちゃん, Umi no Ie Tetchan).
- Yukio Watari (航 ユキオ, Watari Yukio; 35, 38): Jun's father and the CEO of Watari Holdings (航ホールディングス, Watari Hōrudingusu) who wants Jun to quit the UFDA and succeed him as the CEO.
- Kentaro (ケンタロウ, Kentarō; 40-42): Tama-chan's childhood friend who is a member of the Hyper Rescue Nagoya team.
- Marimo Taiga (大河 マリモ, Taiga Marimo; 43): Riku and Naoshi's younger sister and Asuka's aunt who works on her parents' livestock farm.
- Koji Misaki (岬 コウジ, Misaki Kōji; 46): A manga artist who is drawing a manga called Fire Rescue (ファイアーレスキュー, Faiā Resukyū) and a former fire fighter who was Tsubasa's senpai until an accident rendered him to a wheelchair. He wants his younger sister Nana (ナナ, Nana; 46) to give up her dream of becoming a fire fighter for her own good before he finally accepts her decision.

=== Jakaen ===
The Jakaen (ジャカエン, Jakaen; "Evil Fire") are a group of fire demons who gave humans fire long ago. However, after seeing their gift used for selfish reasons to the point of endangering the Earth, the Jakaen made it their goal to make people suffer by causing Super-Fire (超火災, Chōkasai). Sealed long ago by a warrior with the freezing powers of five Blue Pearls, the Jakaen's release into the world was the reason for the formation of the Rescue Fire team. Their original base of operations was underneath Tateishi City, making it the site of most Jakaen attacks until Donkaen's first defeat by Fire-1 X.

- Donkaen (ドンカエン, Donkaen; "Don Fire"): The head of the Jakaen, he is the last of the Fire Tribe (火族, Hizoku). Though his true form was a giant dragon with three additional heads on his body, Donkaen assumed a giant fireball-like form when he divided his full power into the Three Commanders, normally resting on a fire cauldron. Originally sealed within the North Pole by the ancient warrior, he is revived by global warming and recreates the Jakaen to have his revenge. Though he played with Fire-1, Donkaen gets serious when his opponent gains the X-Basher, eating the Commanders for their powers to assume an incomplete version of his true form, unable to grow his additional heads, before being defeated by Rescue King's X Crash. He survived, but is now much smaller and resting in a stone shrine until he decides to enter the center of Earth to rest within the magma to restore himself to true form while reaffirming his conviction. Making his return after killing off Joukaen, Donkaen sends the Commanders after the Pearl of Love while he goes after the Pearl of Friendship in Mongolia. But realizing the Pearl's not in the country, Don Kaen leaves for space and becomes a second sun to intensify the heat on Earth to the point of melting the ice caps. Overpowering Great Wyvern GX, Donkaen battles Rescue King after losing his additional heads, trapping the giant robot within the giant sun. But with the Blue Pearls, Fire-1 stops Donkaen yet chooses not to destroy him and pleas for peace. But Donkaen refuses to listen, forcing Fire 1-X to freeze Donkaen while promising him that he'll save the world. Though Donkaen accepts his fate and drifts into deep space, he vowed that he will return should Tatsuya fail to keep his promise.
- Three Commanders (三大幹部, San Daikanbu): Created by Donkaen, they carry out the task of attacking humanity for him. They each master a technique called Revenge Fire (リベンジカエン, Ribenji Kaen) that allows them to enhance their Fire Majin. When defeated, a Commander is subjected to torture in the form of cool-tasting treats like ice cream before Donkaen resorts to punishments related to each Commander's recent scheme. Their team attack is the Jakaen Bomber (ジャカエンボンバー, Jakaen Bonbā), a giant fireball that result from merging their Jaka Cores. Through Jokaen, whose power boost causes their weapons to turn red, the Three Commanders not only assume Fire Majin forms called Hyper Kaen (ハイパーカエン, Haipā Kaen), but also Hyper Gattaien (ハイパーガッタイエン, Haipā Gattaien) forms like Hyper SakaChukaen (ハイパーサカチュウカエン, Haipā Sakachūkaen; 31) and the Triple Gattaien UkaSakaChukaen (ウカサカチュウカエン, Ukasakachūkaen; 36, 49). They are sent by Joukaen to lure the Fire Rescue Team away from the Fire Phoenix while he hijacks it. Though pumped up their strongest, the three are defeated by Fire-1 X and the Sky Team. Taking Qsuke hostage, the Commanders fall for his Trojan trap to get the Rescue Fire team into the Fire Phoenix before GaiaLeon drives them off. After Donkaen's return, the Three Commanders are sent to Lake Motosu to find the Pearl of Love and destroy it. Evaporating the lake from all sides, the Commanders assume their UkaSakaChukaen form to take out the revealed Pearl of Love while causing a massive forest fire. They overpower both the dragon and Great Wyvern GX until the Pearl of Friendship reveals itself, with UkaSakaChukaen shattered by the Great Wyvern Attack. Near death, the Commanders make a final attempt on the Rescue Fire team before they are reabsorbed, their faces appearing on Donkaen's additional heads. They were frozen by the Super Fire Dragon, the Super Jet Falcon, and the Fire Phoenix before being shattered by the Rescue King, surviving the attack as they resume their usual forms while attempting to revive Donkaen before deciding to find another planet to live on in peace.
  - Chukaen (チュウカエン, Chūkaen): The female executive who mainly creates Fire Majin from plants, using a peacock-feathered war fan as her weapon. Her appearance is based on a cobra and a pharaoh, her Hyper Kaen form being a four-eyed naga version of herself with wings for arms that enable her to fly. With Sakaen, Chukaen can execute the Heartbreak Hyper Revenge Fire (ハートブレイクハイパーリベンジカエン, Hātobureiku Haipā Ribenji Kaen). Being the cook, she is irate that Sakaen and Ukaen would prefer the cooking of Manpuku Town to her own. As a result, Chukaen goes to the town and captures the chiefs to prove her superiority to them while using them to capture the Rescue Fire members. But she is challenged by Tama-chan, losing to her and baring a grudge against her since. Taking Jokaen to where the Fire Phoenix is normally stationed, Chukaen is consumed in Jokaen's flames and overpowers the Rescue Fire team and Fire-5 until Fire-1 X defeats her. But Jokaen revives her as a Hyper Kaen as Rescue King and the Super Jet Falcon drive her off. Chukaen and her Fire Majin later attacked Sydney in order to keep the Sky Team and GaiaLeon from interfering with Jokaen's plan. On Valentine's Day, her plan to selling explosive chocolate is ruined as Joukaen turns her into the Hyper Gattaien Choco BananaChukaen (チョコバナナチュウカエン, Choko Bananachūkaen; 45) before being defeated by the Cerberus Dragon and then shattered by the Wyvern Cannon. Chukaen's name comes from the Japanese word for "center" (中, chū), ending her sentences with "C" (シー, shī).
  - Ukaen (ウカエン, Ukaen): A tactician who mainly creates Fire Majin from machines, he is the first to attack after revealing the existence of the Rescue Fire team to their master. His appearance is based on a Chinese Dragon wrapped around his body. His weapon is a rod with a dragon's head that doubles as a sword, his Hyper Kaen being a warrior version of himself with a spear as his weapon. Getting personal information on Tatsuya, Ukaen uses Roboten to torch Himawari School before piloting it under it is defeated by the Super Fire Dragon. After escaping a pumped up Fire-1, Donkaen gives Ukaen a power boost that nearly kills him. While in his powered state, later given an improved version of his cane to control his power, Ukaen could destroy a city block easily as well as create giant Fire Majin without using Revenge Fire. Jokaen later uses Ukaen to cause a fire on Midori Hill in a plan to lure out the Rescue Fire teams and take them out one by one until Gaia Leon intervenes and sends Hyper Ukaen flying. Soon after a failed attempt to get the X-Basher, Ukaen is combined with a Katchuen to form the Hyper Gattaien UKatchuen (ウカッチュウエン, Ukatchūen; 33) before being blasted off by the Wyvern Cannon. He and his Fire Majin later distracted the Rescue Fire team during Jokaen's plan. While at Nagoya, Ukaen attempts to propose to weather lady Azusa Naganuma to fill the void in his life, only to have his heart broken and form a grudge against Tsubasa when he later kidnapped Nana Misaki before Jokaen uses the girl's pocket knife to turn Ukaen the Hyper Gattaien UCutteren (ウカッターエン, Ukattāen; 46) prior to being shattered by the Super Jet Falcon. During R1's visit to Japan, Ukaen is turned into a chemical vat after he and Sakaen are sent flying by Jokaen. His residual energy turns it into when he dubs Dangerous Slime as he intends to use it to cause a Super Disaster. But Fire-1X and R-1 Max defeat him and Sakaen, forcing them to combine with a group of Kanikaen to form the Triple Hyper Gattaien KaniUkaSakaen (カニウカサカエン, Kaniukasakaen; 44) before being shattered by the Cerberus Dragon. Ukaen's name comes from the Japanese word for "right" (右, u), ending his sentences with "R" (アル, aru).
  - Sakaen (サカエン, Sakaen): A strongman who mainly creates Fire Majin from animals, he uses a morning star as his weapon and can shoot his ball-like fists out on chains and retract them back into place. His appearance is based on a volcanic island and his Hyper Kaen form is a gorilla-like version of himself riding on a balancing ball much like the spheres he holds. He also has an allergic reaction to eggs and a thing for Tama-chan. Infused with Jokaen's flames after he uses him and his fellow commanders in extreme variations of games like soccer and bowling, Sakaen lures out the Rescue Fire team by wrecking everything in sight, even attacking his own allies. Though Fire-1 X defeats him, Jokaen revives him as a Hyper Kaen before Rescue King sends him flying. He was enhanced again and was sent flying after being defeated from GaiaLeon's Final Rescue. He later is combined with Chukaen into Hyper SakaChukaen before being defeated by the Great Wyvern GX. Later used in Jokaen's plan to get back at the Rescue Fire team through Jun's father, Sakaen battles Fire 5 before being defeated by Fire-1 X. However, Jokaen combines Sakaen with a Haekaen to form the Hyper Gattaien HaeSakaen (ハエサカエン, Haesakaen; 35) before being shattered by the Wyvern Cannon. Sakaen and his Fire Majin later attacked London in order to keep the Rescue Force team from interfering with Jokaen's plan. Sakaen's name comes from the Japanese word for "left" (左, sa), ending his sentences with "L" (エル, eru).
- Jokaen (ジョウカエン, Jōkaen; 27-48): Jakaen's top commander, he originally attempted to set up relations to stop the war between his kind and the humans. However, seeing his actions as an act of betrayal, Donkaen secretly arranges it that Joukaen would be sealed by the humans within the South Pole. But in the present, due to the Rescue Fire nearly extinguishing him, Donkaen releases Jokaen to serve as acting leader. The ordeal of being betrayed results with Joukaen becoming an insane lunatic in personality who trusts no one and enjoys the suffering of others, his face becoming an upside down face illusion, having a usual happy face that slips into an enraged face when Jokaen gets serious. He uses a scissors sword as his weapon. He masters a technique that allows him to enhance the Three Commanders into Fire Majin forms using his fire as turn them into Hyper Kaen with his feather. Jokaen spends his freedom embracing the modern times but kept getting bored after using the commanders in various games for his amusement, until he uses Sakaen to cause a rampage as the Rescue Fire team arrives. Shooting his flames across the city, he attracts Fire-1's attention, reminding of the warrior whom he was betrayed by as he forms a rivalry based on their ideals. Obtaining the Blue Orb of Purity, Jokaen tainted it into an orb of "Impurity" (濁, Daku). During Christmas time, Jokaen sends the Commanders to the three corners of the World to distract the UFDA rescue branches as he hijacks a space shuttle to make his way towards Comet Soho (ソーホー彗星, Sōhō Suisei) to change its trajectory towards Earth. After fighting Fire-1 X on the comet's surface and losing the purified Blue Orb in the process, Jokaen fuses into Soho to become the two-faced Hyper Gattaien Suiseien (スイセイエン, Suiseien; 38). However, the Great Wyvern GX manages to freeze Suiseien before he can enter Earth's atmosphere and shatter him with Great Wyvern Attack. But Jokaen survived and recuperated in the magma under Nagoya City, causing a heatwave in the city before obtaining the Blue Pearl of Joy and tainted it into a pearl of "Sadness" (悲, Hi) that gives him super speed. After a duel with Fire-1 X, knowing his time has almost run out on him, Joukaen decides to finish off the Rescue Fire team by hijacking the Fire Phoenix while taking Mie and Taiga hostage as he forces the Rescue fire team to disarm themselves. When the Rescue Fire team regain the Fire Phoenix, Joukaen challenges Fire 1-X to a final duel while clashing ideologies. Though he uses the pearl to assume Hyper Kaen form, Joukaen is defeated. But shocked that Fire 1-X spares him, Joukaen's face returns to his normal as his faith in humanity is rekindled. Attempting to ask the revived Donkaen to reconsider their fight, Joukaen learns Donkaen's part in his sealing. Enraged to find out he was betrayed by his own kind, Joukaen attacks Donkaen, but was eventually killed and sank in the magma. Jokaen's name comes from the Japanese word for "top" (上, jō).
- Jakasts (ジャカスト, Jakasuto): The Jakasts are the Jakaen foot soldiers, who constantly chant "jaka" (ジャカ).

==== Fire Majin ====
The Super-Fire causing Fire Majin (火炎魔人, Kaen Majin) are created by the Three Commanders from a Jaka Core (ジャカ玉, Jakadama) they each carry which whirls to life once exposed to a heat source and enters the nearest object in the area, taking its physical form before going on a rampage to seek vengeance. A Fire Majin can be enlarged and upgraded by commanders' Revenge Fire. Two or more Fire Majin can merge into a more powerful Gattaien (ガッタイエン, Gattaien) when their commanders engage Revenge Fire at the same time. Since Jokaen's appearance, the Fire Majin are not used much other than boost up a commander's power as a Hyper Gattaien.

- Biken (バイクエン, Baikuen; 1, 20, 37): A smoldering motorcycle Fire Majin created to infect other bikes with its flames as part of Ukaen's scheme to attack the city, in order to make it a deadly example to the UFDA for attempting to stop them. When Rescue Fire arrives and Rescue Striker takes out the massive numbers, Ukaen uses his Revenge Fire to combine the remaining bikes into a giant fire-breathing bike monster that takes out Rescue Striker. The tables soon turn when Fire Dragon is scrambled and freezes Biken with Ice Tornado before smashing it with the Dragon Attack. Later, another group of Bikaen were created before Jokaen combines them into the larger Hyper Biken (ハイパーバイクエン, Haipā Baikuen; 43) for Ukaen to ride on before it is shattered by RescueKing and Gaia Leon.
- Inukaen (イヌカエン, Inukaen; 2): A dog Fire Majin.
- Kinokoen (キノコエン, Kinokoen; 3, 19, 37): A giant mushroom Fire Majin.
- Keitaien (ケイタイエン, Keitaien; 4, 37): A mobile phone Fire Majin.
- Karasuen (カラスエン, Karasuen; 5, 28): A crow Fire Majin.
- Bananaen (バナナエン, Bananaen; 6): A banana Fire Majin with a sombrero, the festive Bananaen can shoot banana boomerangs and banana peels as it causes a fire in an elementary school. After being defeated by an enraged Fire-3 attacks it for making her look the fool, Fire-1 defeats the Fire Majin with Blizzard Slash. However, Chukaen uses her Revenge Fire to revive Bananaen into a flying giant peeled version of itself. But the monster is destroyed by the Combination Attack of Fire Dragon and Dozer Dragon. On Valentine's Day, Chukaen creates a variation of Bannanen from a chocolate-coated banana on a stick, Choco Bananaen (チョコバナナエン, Chokobananaen; 45), as her enforcer with its Choco Banana Boomerangs. After Fire-3 tricks the Fire Majin into attacking its master, she forces it back to its original form.
- Drillen (ドリルエン, Doriruen; 7): A Fire Majin created from the Rescue Drill.
- Haekaen (ハエカエン, Haekaen; 8, 35, 37): A fly Fire Majin.
- Kanitanken (カニタンクエン, Kanitankuen; 9, 37): Created from a toy tank, Tanken (タンクエン, Tankuen; 9, 37) was used to take advantage of the Fire Dragon's damage, attacking the Rescue Striker on Ukaen's orders until Sakaen intervene with his crab Fire Majin Kanikaen (カニカエン, Kanikaen; 9, 37, 44) in what turned into an all-out brawl before Donkaen forces Ukaen and Sakaen to combine their Fire Majin into a Gattaien to turn the odds in their favor. But after Kanitanken scraps the Rescue Striker, the Super Rescue Dragon is formed and freezing Gattaien with Super Ice Tornado before shattering it with the Super Dragon Attack. Another Kanitanken appears in London, with R1 personally destroying it.
- Cabbatruen (キャベトラエン, Kyabetoraen; 11): A Fire Majin created from the combination of the Subaru Sambar pickup truck Fire Majin Trucken (トラックエン, Torakkuen; 11, 37) and the cabbage Fire Majin Cabbagen (キャベツエン, Kyabetsuen; 11, 37).
- Hebikaen (ヘビカエン, Hebikaen; 12): A cobra-like snake Fire Majin.
- Roboten (ロボットエン, Robottoen; 13, 19): A Fire Majin created from a toy robot, later transformed into the Giant Roboten (ジャイアントロボットエン, Jaianto Robottoen).
- Ikutteren (イカッターエン, Ikattāen; 14): The combination of the squid Fire Majin Ikakaen (イカカエン, Ikakaen; 14, 19, 37) and the box cutter Fire Majin Cutteren (カッターエン, Kattāen; 14).
- Mamekaen (マメカエン, Mamekaen; 15, 37): A Fire Majin created from several beans.
- Nekkoen (ネッコエン, Nekkoen; 16): A Fire Majin created from the roots of a lone tree.
- Kumokaen (クモカエン, Kumokaen; 16, 37): A spider Fire Majin.
- Natsukazeen (ナツカゼエン, Natsukazeen; 17): A summer cold virus Fire Majin.
- Rocket Hanabien (ロケットハナビエン, Roketto Hanabien; 18, 37): A Fire Majin made from skyrockets.
- Roboikakinokoen (ロボイカキノコエン, Roboikakinokoen; 19, 37): Used in a divide and counter scheme, the Commanders combine a Robokaen, a Kinokoen, and an Ikakaen to form a Triple Gattaien (トリプルガッタイエン, Toripuru Gattaien). Though able to withstand the Final Rescues of the Super Fire Dragon and Super Jet Falcon, Roboikakinokoen is destroyed by the Great Wyvern. Another Roboikakinokoen appeared in Sydney before the Falcon Vehicles destroy it.
- Obakeen (オバケエン, Obakeen; 21): A Fire Majin created from a fake ghost.
- Barakaen (バラカエン, Barakaen; 23, 37): A Fire Majin created from a bouquet of roses.
- Katchuen (カッチュウエン, Katchūen; 24-25, 33, 37): A giant knight Fire Majin created from a suit of armor.
- Mukadeen (ムカデエン, Mukadeen; 28, 37): A centipede Fire Majin.
- Koalaen (コアラエン, Koaraen; 41): A koala Fire Majin created from Chiroru, a koala at Higashiyama Zoo and Botanical Gardens, when Sakaen thought he was being brushed off as he intended to have Koalaen wreck Nagoya during its second bicenntial so everyone would hate the koala. Though it appeared to cause trouble, Koalaen was actually scared. Risking his own life, Tatsuya manages to free Chiroru with the formless Fire Majin destroyed with the Wyvern Cannon.
- Hyper Shachihokoen (ハイパーシャチホコエン, Haipā Shachihokoen; 42): A Hyper Gattaien formed by Shachihokoen (シャチホコエン, Shachihokoen; 42) Jokaen created from the shachihoko on Nagoya Castle to have the Fire Majin ironically burn Nagoya. But the Rescue Vehicles and GaiaLeon intervene to give the HyperRescue team time to extinguish the fire as Great Wyvern GX finishes the Hyper Gattaien off.

== Rescue Vehicles ==
=== Rescue Dashes ===
The Rescue Dashes (レスキューダッシュ, Resukyū Dasshu) are the Core Units for the larger Rescue Vehicles, each equipped with a Safety Field barrier. These can be utilized in newer vehicle models for execution of either a Dragon Attack or a Falcon Attack.

- Rescue Dash-1 (レスキューダッシュ1, Resukyū Dasshu Wan): A special regulation Nissan 370Z cruiser assigned to Fire-1; serves as the cockpit for Fire Dragon Rescue Vehicle and Rescue Striker Rescue Vehicle in episode 9.
- Rescue Dash-2 (レスキューダッシュ2, Resukyū Dasshu Tsū): A special regulation Nissan Paramedic ambulance assigned to Fire-2; serves as the cockpit for Dozer Dragon Rescue Vehicle.
- Rescue Dash-3 (レスキューダッシュ3, Resukyū Dasshu Surī): A special regulation Nissan Cube assigned to Fire-3; serves as the cockpit for Turbo Dragon Rescue Vehicle and Rescue Striker Rescue Vehicle in episode 1,2,3,4,5 and 7.
- Rescue Dash-4 (レスキューダッシュ4, Resukyū Dasshu Fō): A special regulation Nissan Skyline Coupe assigned to Fire-4; serves as the cockpit for the Jet Falcon.
- Rescue Dash-5 (レスキューダッシュ5, Resukyū Dasshu Faibu): A special regulation Nissan X-Trail assigned to Fire-5; serves as the cockpit for the Heli Falcon.
- Rescue Dash-6 (レスキューダッシュ6, Resukyū Dasshu Shikkusu): A special regulation Nissan Murano assigned to Riku.

=== Rescue Striker ===
The Rescue Striker (レスキューストライカー, Resukyū Sutoraikā) is a large-scale water truck Rescue Vehicle assigned to Fire-3 prior to the completion of Turbo Dragon. It was borrowed from Rescue Force. Its Final Rescue is the Water Cannon (ウォーターキャノン, Wōtā Kyanon), shooting a jet of liquid nitrogen. It once combined with the Rescue Drill to become the Drill Striker in order to destroy Drillen with its Final Rescue, Drill Boost. While the Fire Dragon was being repaired, Fire-1 was given the Rescue Striker to pilot until it sacrificed itself to save Fire-1 from Kanitanken's attack. It has since been repaired, and is currently again in use of Rescue Force's R1.

=== 2nd Generation Rescue Vehicles ===
The Rescue Vehicles (レスキュービークル, Resukyū Bīkuru) used by the Rescue Fire and Sky teams have two configuration modes: Scramble Mode (スクランブルモード, Sukuranburu Mōdo) and Rescue Mode (レスキューモード, Resukyū Mōdo).

Fire Dragon (ファイアードラゴン, Faiā Doragon)
The Fire Dragon is a large-scale Rescue Vehicle assigned to Fire-1. It largely facilitates the functions of a fire engine and semi-trailer truck. In Scramble Mode, Fire Dragon functions as auto-transport for the small-scale Rescue Vehicles for immediate transport to the disaster site. Rescue Mode transforms the vehicle bed into a fire fighting apparatus. This formation has access to Drain Water (ドレインウォーター, Dorein Wōtā), Dragon Shot (ドラゴンショット, Doragon Shotto), Dragon Ladder (ドラゴンラダー, Doragon Radā), and Dragon Anchor (ドラゴンアンカー, Doragon Ankā) cables functions. Its Final Rescue is the Ice Tornado (アイストルネード, Aisu Torunēdo) which fires twin streams of icy water at the enemy to freeze them, before a Dragon Attack (ドラゴンアタック, Doragon Atakku) shoots the flaming Rescue Dash-1 to finish the target off.
Dozer Dragon (ドーザードラゴン, Dōzā Doragon)
The Dozer Dragon is a medium-scale Rescue Vehicle assigned to Fire-2 which has a bulldozer Rescue Mode, which originally had a flaw in the cooling system that shut the vehicle down after 45 seconds. It is able to execute the Dragon Tornado Drop (ドラゴン竜巻落とし, Doragon Tatsumaki Otoshi) and the Tough Machine Drop using the Dragon Bucket (ドラゴンバケット, Doragon Baketto). Other abilities include shooting Dragon Anchor cables. It can also fling another Rescue Vehicle at the target to unleash the other Rescue Vehicle's Final Rescue using the Dragon Bucket in a Combination Attack. Its Final Rescue is the Bind Crash (バインドクラッシュ, Baindo Kurasshu), which creates a freeze wave that makes its way to the target before the Dozer Dragon charges at it once frozen, lifting it into the air. It then executes a Dragon Attack with the flaming Rescue Dash-2 to finish the job.
Turbo Dragon (ターボドラゴン, Tābo Doragon)
The Turbo Dragon is a medium-scale large blower Rescue Vehicle assigned to Fire-3 with a turbofan Rescue Mode that allows it to execute the blast attack from the Dragon Turbofan (ドラゴンターボファン, Doragon Tābofan). Its Final Rescue is the Blast Hurricane (ブラストハリケーン, Burasuto Harikēn), using the sirens' sound wave to cause the fan to fire a spiraling ice stream that freezes the target and leaves it open for a Dragon Attack from the Rescue Dash-3.
Jet Falcon (ジェットファルコン, Jetto Farukon)
The Jet Falcon is a large-scale fighter jet Rescue Vehicle assigned to Fire-4. It launches Hydro Missiles (ハイドロミサイル, Haidoro Misairu) from wings. Its Final Rescue is the Aurora Break (オーロラブレイク, Ōrora Bureiku), creating a jetstream around the enemy, followed by a Falcon Attack (ファルコンアタック, Farukon Atakku) or a Double Falcon Attack with Heli Falcon.
Heli Falcon (ヘリファルコン, Heri Farukon)
The Heli Falcon is a medium-scale Rescue Vehicle assigned to Fire-5 which has a fighter jet Scramble Mode and a helicopter Rescue Mode. It shoots Hydro Laser (ハイドロイレイザー, Haidoro Reizā) from the nose. Its Final Rescue is the Freeze Corridor (フリーズコールダー, Furīzu Kōrudā), creating ice whirlwind that covers enemy, followed by a Falcon Attack or a Double Falcon Attack with Jet Falcon.

=== X-Dragon ===
The X-Dragon (エクスドラゴン, Ekusu Doragon) is a large-scale ambulance Rescue Vehicle with AI and VVEL engine assigned to Fire-1, who possessed a strong enough Rescue Soul to use it. It can also remote control it through the Rescue Megaphone. It can assume either Vehicle Mode (ビークルモード, Bīkuru Mōdo), able to shield itself generating the Safety Field (セイフティフィールド, Seifuti Fīrudo) and shoot the Drain Water, and Drill Mode (ドリルモード, Doriru Mōdo). The X-Dragon can also transform into the humanoid Robot Mode (ロボットモード, Robotto Mōdo) named X-Dragon Robo (エクスドラゴンロボ, Ekusu Doragon Robo), able to execute the Final Rescue X Meteor Punch (エクス流星パンチ, Ekusu Ryūsei Panchi), which it delivers a powerful fiery punch to the enemy.

=== GaiaLeon ===
GaiaLeon (ガイアレオン, Gaiareon) is a large-scale driverless Rescue Vehicle with AI and VVEL engine which has an excavator Vehicle Mode and a lion type robot Beast Mode (ビーストモード, Bīsuto Mōdo). As a result of being prideful, GaiaLeon acts on his own whim and listens to those he can acknowledge. Its Final Rescue is the Leon Burst (レオンバースト, Reon Bāsuto), which fires a powerful freezing bullet which splits into 4 lion-shaped bullets that freezes and destroy the enemy on contact.

=== Upgraded Medium-scale Rescue Vehicles ===
These are an upgraded version of the medium-scale Rescue Vehicles based on the same models used by the Rescue Force.

- Rescue Shovel Red Type (レスキューショベルレッドタイプ, Resukyū Shoberu Reddo Taipu): A drag shovel Rescue Vehicle which can transform into Claw Mode (クローモード, Kurō Mōdo).
- Rescue Drill Black Type (レスキュードリルブラックタイプ, Resukyū Doriru Burakku Taipu): A tank-like Rescue Vehicle with twin drills and a cutoff saw on top. The Black Type also has active camouflage.
- Rescue Turbo Red Type (レスキューターボレッドタイプ, Resukyū Tābo Reddo Taipu): A large blower Rescue Vehicle with a turbofan on it.
- Rescue Dozer Blue Type (レスキュードーザーブルータイプ, Resukyū Dōzā Burū Taipu): A dump truck Rescue Vehicle which can transform into Dozer Drive Mode (ドーザードライブモード, Dōzā Doraibu Mōdo) from Dump Mode (ダンプモード, Danpu Mōdo).
- Rescue Crane Green Type (レスキュークレーングリーンタイプ, Resukyū Kurēn Gurīn Taipu): A crane Rescue Vehicle.

=== Rescue Vehicle Combinations ===
Super Fire Dragon (スーパーファイアードラゴン, Sūpā Faiā Doragon)
The Super Fire Dragon is the combination of all three Dragon Vehicles. Its Final Rescue is the Super Ice Tornado (スーパーアイストルネード, Sūpā Aisu Torunēdo), an improved version of the Ice Tornado that freezes the enemy, followed by the Super Dragon Attack (スーパードラゴンアタック, Sūpā Doragon Atakku) with the Rescue Dash-1 having thrice the impact on the enemy.
Super Jet Falcon (スーパージェットファルコン, Sūpā Jetto Farukon)
The Super Jet Falcon is the combination of both Falcon Vehicles. Its Final Rescue is the Super Aurora Break (スーパーオーロラブレイク, Sūpā Ōrora Bureiku), creating a wind that freezes the opponent instantly, followed by a Super Falcon Attack (スーパーファルコンアタック, Sūpā Farukon Atakku).
Great Wyvern (グレートワイバーン, Gurēto Waibān)
The Great Wyvern is the combination of the Super Fire Dragon and the Super Jet Falcon. Its Final Rescue is the Infinite Thunder (インフィニットサンダー, Infinitto Sandā) where a giant wave of electricity is fired from the great Wyvern's mouth, followed by a Wyvern Attack (ワイバーンアタック, Waibān Atakku) with the electrically charged Rescue Dash-1 finishing the target.
Rescue King (レスキューキング, Resukyū Kingu)
The Rescue King is the humanoid combination of the Fire Dragon and the X-Dragon. Its weapon is the King X-Basher (キングエクスバッシャー, Kingu Ekusu Basshā) and its Final Rescue is the X Crash (エクスクラッシュ, Ekusu Kurasshu), during which Fire-1 X charges the X-Basher and finishes the opponent with a freezing cross slash. Riding on GaiaLeon, Rescue King can combine their signature Final Rescues to execute the Double Impact Double Final Rescue.
Great Wyvern GX (グレートワイバーンGX, Gurēto Waibān Jī Ekkusu)
The Great Wyvern GX is the combination of the Great Wyvern, the X-Dragon, and the GaiaLeon. The formation was original inaccessible as Tatsuya is unable to endure the combination until he gains the Blue Pearl of Faith. Its Final Rescue is the Great Hurricane (グレートハリケーン, Gurēto Harikēn), fire a multitude of blasts that not only freeze the target but also extinguishes the surrounding fire. It is then followed by a Great Wyvern Attack (グレートワイバーンアタック, Gurēto Waibān Atakku) where all five Rescue Dashes are launched at once.
Wyvern Cannon (ワイバーンキャノン, Waibān Kyanon)
The Wyvern Cannon is the combination of the Dozer Dragon and Turbo Dragon with the Super Jet Falcon, serving as a cannon for Rescue King. In this mode, the Wyvern Cannon fires a freezing bullet which destroys the enemy in one shot.
Cerberus Dragon (ケルベロスドラゴン, Keruberosu Doragon)
The Cerberus is the combination of the Fire Dragon and all five upgraded medium-scale Rescue Vehicles. Its Final Rescue is the Cerberus Crash (ケルベロスクラッシュ, Keruberosu Kurasshu), which Cerberus Dragon fires multiple Ice blasts to the enemy, freezing it on contact and finishes it with an all out crush using its drills, shovel and crane attachments.

== Rescue Tools ==
=== Rescue Megaphone ===
The Suit-Up Megaphone Rescue Megaphone (着装メガホン レスキューメガホーン, Chakusō Megahon Resukyū Megahōn) is the team's common suit-up tool with AI. Shifting its lever to various modes allows the user to relay commands. Fire-1's Rescue Megaphone is replaced with one possessing a TF-Q robot mode. Nicknamed Q-suke (Qスケ, Kyūsuke), the robot is designed to help Tatsuya become more professional. Q-suke is also outfitted with the ability to shoot lasers from his eyes.

- FIRE UP: Transforms the user into suit-up form upon the command "Suit-Up" (着装, Chakusō).
- DASH GO: Launches a Rescue Dash vehicle from a Dragon vehicle.
- SCRAMBLE: Starts the Rescue Vehicles.
- FINAL RESCUE: Executes the Rescue Vehicles' Final Rescue.
- DRAGON UP: Combines Dragon vehicles.

=== Tri-Basher ===
The Rescue Fire Extinguisher Tri-Basher (レスキュー消火器トライバッシャー, Resukyū Shōkaki Torai Basshā) is the team's common rescue tool with three modes. Sword and Gun Modes can execute a powerful attack, by performing a Dragon Charge (ドラゴンチャージ, Doragon Chāji) on a Rescue Soul.

- Fire Extinguisher Mode (消火器モード, Shōkaki Mōdo): Shoots special fire-extinguishing liquid.
- Sword Mode (ソードモード, Sōdo Mōdo): Its powerful attack is the Blizzard Slash (ブリザードスラッシュ, Burizādo Surasshu).
- Gun Mode (ガンモード, Gan Mōdo): Its powerful attack is the Blizzard Bullet (ブリザードバレット, Burizādo Barreto).

=== Jet Caliber ===
The Suit-Up Flying Sword Jet Caliber (着装飛剣ジェットカリバー, Chakusō Hiken Jetto Karibā) is the Sky Team's common suit-up and rescue tool, normally kept in the Sky Team's Rescue Dash vehicles until needed. It is usually in Jet Mode (ジェットモード, Jetto Mōdo) until suit-up. Voicing to its microphone on a pommel to various modes allows the user to relay commands. Allows the Sky Team to fly using its Jet Burner (ジェットバーナー, Jetto Bānā) function. Sword Mode can execute a powerful attack, by performing a Falcon Charge (ファルコンチャージ, Farukon Chāji) on a Rescue Soul.

- Sword Mode (ソードモード, Sōdo Mōdo): Its sword guard is a command display and shoots special fire-extinguishing liquid from a fan on it. Its powerful attack is the Sky V Letter Slash (天空Vの字斬り, Tenkū Bui no Ji Giri).
  - SKY UP: Transforms the user into suit-up form upon the command "Sky Suit-Up" (天空着装, Tenkū Chakusō).
  - DASH GO: Launches a Rescue Dash vehicle from a Falcon vehicle.
  - SCRAMBLE: Starts the Rescue Vehicles.
  - FINAL RESCUE: Executes the Rescue Vehicles' Final Rescue.
  - FALCON UP: Combines Falcon vehicles upon the command "Sky Gattai" (スカイ合体, Sukai Gattai).

=== X-Basher ===
The Rescue Extinguishing Sword X-Basher (レスキュー消火剣エクスバッシャー, Resukyū Shōkaken Ekusu Basshā) is Fire-1 X's personal suit-up and rescue tool. It was created from the Ryudouken (龍導剣, Ryūdōken; Dragon Guiding Sword), an ancient weapon with five Blue Orbs (青き珠, Aoki Tama) installed on it which defeated Donkaen in the past. Over time, the orbs have disappeared and the sword became embedded in its resting place behind Donkaen's throne until Asuka finds and frees it. Though it was heavy and rusted, the Ryudouken transforms when it reacts to Fire-1's Rescue Soul. Eventually, the X-Basher regains the Blue Pearls of "Faith" (信, Shin) from Ryujin Village, "Purity" (清, Sei) from the Dragon's Marsh after Jokaen took it, "Joy" (喜, Ki) from Nagoya City after Jokaen took it, "Love" (愛, Ai) from Lake Motosu, and "Friendship" (友, Tomo) from Mongolia, which was Asuka's blue stone. Turning its key to various modes allows the user to relay commands. Its Sword Mode is activated by spinning its X-Wheel (エクスホイール, Ekusu Hoīru) and performing a Dragon Charge on a Rescue Soul. The weapon was left behind with Donkaen after Fire 1X chose to seal him by freezing him instead dealing a fatal blow.

- Sword Mode (ソードモード, Sōdo Mōdo)
  - X-FIRE UP: Transforms Fire-1 into Fire-1 X form upon the command "X Suit-Up" (エクス着装, Ekusu Chakusō) with a 5-minute limit.
  - X-ATTACK: Executes the Dragon King X-Slash (龍王エクス斬り, Ryūō Ekusu Giri), which is normally used against a single opponent.
  - F-RESCUE: Executes Rescue King's Final Rescue.
- Fire Extinguish Gun Mode (消火銃モード, Shōkajū Mōdo)

=== Rescue Breaker ===
The Rescue Breaker (レスキューブレイカー, Resukyū Bureikā) is the team's other common handheld tool with eight modes, previously used by the Rescue Force. It is usually in Mobile Mode (モバイルモード, Mobairu Mōdo) until needed.

- Break Hammer (ブレイクハンマー, Bureiku Hanmā): A hammer mode.
- Break Ax (ブレイクアックス, Bureiku Akkusu): An axe mode. Used primarily by Yuma.
- Break Pick (ブレイクピック, Bureiku Pikku): A pick mode.
- Break Hand (ブレイクハンド, Bureiku Hando): A manipulator mode.
- Break Drill (ブレイクドリル, Bureiku Doriru): A drill mode.
- Break Shot (ブレイクショット, Bureiku Shotto): A simple information analysis mode that can be used also as a digital camera.
- Break Rope (ブレイクロープ, Bureiku Rōpu): A rope mode.

== Episodes ==
1. A New Enemy: The Roaring Fire Dragon (新たな敵 ほえよファイアードラゴン, Arata na Teki: Hoeyo Faiā Doragon)
2. Tatsuya is Anxious: His Partner is a Very Nagging Robot (タツヤが心配 相棒は超ウザロボット, Tatsuya ga Shinpai: Aibō wa Chōuza Robotto)
3. Miss Perfect: Ritsuka's Secret (ミス・パーフェクト リツカの秘密, Misu Pāfekuto: Ritsuka no Himitsu)
4. Yuma's Promise: Count on Dozer Dragon (ユウマの約束 頼むぜドーザードラゴン, Yūma no Yakusoku: Tanomu ze Dōzā Doragon)
5. Mama, the Crow, and Everyone are Working Hard (ママもカラスもみんな、がんばってる, Mama mo Karasu mo Minna, Ganbatteru)
6. Tatsuya and Yuma Fight the Super-Fire (タツヤとユウマがケンカして超火災だ, Tatsuya to Yūma ga Kenka shite Chōkasai da)
7. Rescue Force's Vehicles are Targeted (狙われたレスキューフォースのビークル, Nerawareta Resukyū Fōsu no Bīkuru)
8. Haekaen Blown Away: Turbo Dragon (ハエカエンを吹き飛ばせ ターボドラゴン, Haekaen o Fukitobase: Tābo Doragon)
9. The Striker is in a Pinch! Go Three-Piece Combination (ストライカーがピンチ！いくぞ三体合体, Sutoraikā ga Pinchi! Iku zo Santai Gattai)
10. Tama-chan vs. Chukaen (タマちゃんVSチュウカエン, Tamachan Bāsasu Chūkaen)
11. The Heart-filled Hometown, Protect Downtown from the Sea of Flames (心のふるさと、下町を火の海から守れ, Kokoro no Furusato, Shitamachi o Hi no Umi kara Mamore)
12. The Zoo is in Trouble: Also Ritsuka's Weakness (動物園がたいへん そしてリツカの弱点, Dōbutsuen ga Taihen: Soshite Ritsuka no Jakuten)
13. I'll Protect the School: Beyond the Smile (学園はオレがまもる 笑顔の向こう側, Gakuen wa Ore ga Mamoru: Egao no Mukōgawa)
14. A Super-Fire On the Sea! Arrival of the Mysterious Jets (超火災は海の上！出現、謎のジェット, Chōkasai wa Umi no Ue! Shutsugen, Nazo no Jetto)
15. New Friends: Enter the Sky Team (新たなる仲間 出場、スカイチーム, Aratanaru Nakama: Shutsujō, Sukai Chīmu)
16. Make the Sky Combination! Super Jet Falcon (きめろスカイ合体！スーパージェットファルコン, Kimero Sukai Gattai! Sūpā Jetto Farukon)
17. Fly High, Heli Falcon (高く舞い上がれ、ヘリファルコン, Takaku Maiagare, Heri Farukon)
18. A Super-Fire in the Space!? Take Off Fire Phoenix (宇宙で超火災！？飛びたてファイアーフェニックス, Uchū de Chōkasai!? Tobitate Faiā Fenikkusu)
19. Five-Piece Combination! The Great Wyvern is Born (五体合体！誕生、グレートワイバーン, Gotai Gattai! Tanjō, Gurēto Waibān)
20. Recovering Your Partner's Memory (相棒の記憶をとりもどせ, Aibō no Kioku o Torimodose)
21. Swimsuit Suit-up: Special Training at the Beach (水着で着装 渚の特別訓練, Mizugi de Chakusō: Nagisa no Tokubetsu Kunren)
22. Explosively Extinguish the Big Typhoon (巨大台風を爆鎮せよ, Kyodai Taifū o Bakuchin seyo)
23. A Big Traffic Jam, Will Rescue Fire Make It in Time? (大渋滞、間に合うかレスキューファイアー, Daijūtai, Ma ni Au ka Resukyū Faiā)
24. Ukaen Power Up! Fire-1 has Lost? (ウカエンパワーアップ！ファイアー1が負ける？, Ukaen Pawā Appu! Faiā Wan ga Makeru?)
25. Stand-up Tatsuya: Use the New Vehicle (立ち上がれタツヤ 新ビークルと共に, Tachiagare Tatsuya: Shin Bīkuru to Tomo ni)
26. Wake-up! X-Basher (めざめよ！エクスバッシャー, Mezame yo! Ekusu Basshā)
27. The Unknown Powerful Enemy: Jokaen (未知なる強敵 ジョウカエン, Michinaru Kyōteki: Jōkaen)
28. All-Important Colleagues (みんな大事な仲間たち, Minna Daiji na Nakamatachi)
29. Heated Man: Tsubasa's Kindness (熱き男 ツバサの優しさ, Atsuki Otoko: Tsubasa no Yasashisa)
30. Captain's Past: GaiaLeon! Scramble! (隊長の過去 ガイアレオン！スクランブル！, Taichō no Kako: Gaiareon! Sukuranburu!)
31. The Blue Pearls' Secrets: Seven-Piece Combination Completed! (青き珠の秘密 完成、七体合体！, Aoki Tama no Himitsu: Kansei, Nanatai Gattai!)
32. Ritsuka is Overwhelmed: The Proud GaiaLeon (リツカもタジタジ 誇り高きガイアレオン, Ritsuka mo Tajitaji: Hokoritakaki Gaiareon)
33. The Powers Combined: Wyvern Cannon Go Forth! (力を合わせろ ワイバーンキャノン発動！, Chikara o Awasero: Waibān Kyanon Hatsudō!)
34. Driven into a Corner: Tama-chan Suits Up!? (絶体絶命 タマちゃん着装！？, Zettai Zetsumei: Tamachan Chakusō!?)
35. Report to Father, Jun's Rescue Spirit (父にとどけ、ジュンのレスキュー魂, Chichi ni Todoke, Jun no Resukyū Damashii)
36. Get the Second Blue Pearl (二つ目の青き珠を手に入れろ, Futatsume no Aoki Tama o Te ni Irero)
37. Emergency Dispatch: Rescue Force (緊急出場 レスキューフォース, Kinkyū Shutsujō: Resukyū Fōsu)
38. Save the Earth: Great Wyvern GX (地球を救え グレートワイバーンGX, Chikyū o Sukue: Gurēto Waibān Jī Ekkusu)
39. Special Training: With Teamwork We are One! (特別訓練 チームワークでひとつになれ！, Tokubetsu Kunren: Chīmuwāku de Hitotsu ni Nare!)
40. A Super-Fire in Nagoya City? Rescue Fire, Emergency Dispatch (名古屋シティで超火災？レスキュファイアー、緊急出場, Nagoya Shiti de Chōkasai? Resukyū Faiā, Kinkyū Shutsujō)
41. Save the Koala! Rescue Spirit and Kishimen Spirit (コアラを救え！レスキュー魂ときしめん魂, Koara o Sukue! Resukyū Damashii to Kishimen Damashii)
42. Jokaen is still Alive: Nagoya Castle, Duel at the Tower Keep (生きていたジョウカエン 名古屋城、天守閣の決闘, Ikiteita Jōkaen: Nagoyajō, Tenshukaku no Kettō)
43. Captain Taiga, Returning to his Hometown!? (大河隊長、故郷へ帰る！？, Taiga Taichō, Kokyō e Kaeru!?)
44. Suit Up, Double 1! Friendship's New Rescue Combination (着装せよ、ダブル1！友情の新レスキュー合体, Chakusō seyo, Daburu Wan! Yūjō no Shin Resukyū Gattai)
45. Chocolate Flames: A Tumultuous Valentine's Day (炎のチョコレート 波乱のバレンタインデー, Honō no Chokorēto: Haran no Barentaindē)
46. Heated Promises: Tsubasa's Past Revealed (熱き約束 今明かされるツバサの過去, Atsuki Yakusoku: Ima Akasareru Tsubasa no Kako)
47. The Hijacked Fire Phoenix (乗っ取られたファイアーフェニックス, Nottorareta Faiā Fenikkusu)
48. Conclusion: Fire-1 VS Jokaen (決着 ファイアー1VSジョウカエン, Ketchaku: Faiā Wan Bāsasu Jōkaen)
49. The Greatest Crisis: Donkaen, Complete Revival (最大の危機 ドンカエン、完全復活, Saidai no Kiki: Donkaen, Kanzen Fukkatsu)
50. Make a Miracle: The Blue Pearls (奇跡をおこせ 青き珠, Kiseki o Okose: Aoki Tama)
51. The Final Decisive Battle: Explosively Extinguish Donkaen! (最終決戦 ドンカエンを爆鎮せよ!, Saishū Kessen: Donkaen o Bakuchin seyo!)

== Cast ==
- Tatsuya Homura/Fire-1: Sho Kubo (久保 翔, Kubo Shō)
- Yuma Megumi/Fire-2: Yu Kawada (川田 祐, Kawada Yū)
- Ritsuka Yuki/Fire-3: Yu Nakamura (中村 優, Nakamura Yū)
- Tsubasa Aoi/Fire-4: Kazuki Fukuyama (福山 一樹, Fukuyama Kazuki)
- Jun Watari/Fire-5: Masanori Mizuno (水野 真典, Mizuno Masanori)
- Riku Taiga: Masataka Fujishige (藤重 政孝, Fujishige Masataka)
- Tamami Sugiyama: Shizuka Nakamura (中村 静香, Nakamura Shizuka)
- Reiji Osakabe: Hiroshi Fujioka (藤岡 弘、, Fujioka Hiroshi,)
- Naoshi Taiga: Hiromichi Sato (佐藤 弘道, Satō Hiromichi)
- Asuka Taiga: Ayaka Itoh (伊藤 綺夏, Itō Ayaka)
- Q-suke (Voice): Reiko Takagi (高木 礼子, Takagi Reiko)
- AI (Voice): Hajime Iijima (飯島 肇, Iijima Hajime), Reiko Takagi
- Donkaen (Voice): Daisuke Gōri (郷里 大輔, Gōri Daisuke; 1-31), Ryūzaburō Ōtomo (大友 龍三郎, Ōtomo Ryūzaburō; 48-51)
- Jokaen (Voice): Daisuke Kirii (桐井 大介, Kirii Daisuke)
- Chukaen (Voice): Akeno Watanabe (渡辺 明乃, Watanabe Akeno)
- Ukaen (Voice): Susumu Chiba (千葉 進歩, Chiba Susumu)
- Sakaen (Voice): Chafurin (茶風林, Chafūrin)

=== Suit actors ===
- Fire-1: Suguru Onaga (翁長 卓, Onaga Suguru)
- Fire-2: Masaki Inoue (井上 雅稀, Inoue Masaki)
- Fire-3: Minami Taguchi (田口 南, Taguchi Minami)
- Fire-4: Koya Nakashima (中島 厚也, Nakashima Kōya)
- Fire-5: Masaru Shibue (渋江 勝, Shibue Masaru)
- Jokaen: Takayuki Yahara (八原 隆行, Yahara Takayuki)
- Chukaen: Yukie Irei (伊禮 友希恵, Irei Yukie)
- Ukaen: Mitsutoshi Shiroya (城谷 光俊, Shiroya Mitsutoshi)
- Sakaen: Takeshi Matsui (松井 武士, Matsui Takeshi)

== Songs ==
Opening themes

- "Rescue Fire" (レスキューファイアー, Resukyū Faiā)
  - Lyrics & Composition: Hironobu Kageyama
  - Arrangement: Masaki Suzuki
  - Artist: JAM Project
  - Episodes: 1-29
- "Baku-Chin Kan-Ryo! Rescue Fire" (爆鎮完了！レスキューファイアー, Bakuchin Kanryō! Resukyū Faiā; "Explosive Extinguishing Complete! Rescue Fire")
  - Lyrics & Composition: Hironobu Kageyama
  - Arrangement: Masaki Suzuki
  - Artist: JAM Project
  - Episodes: 30-51

Ending themes

- "BURNING HERO (TV Version)" (BURNING HERO（TVバージョン）, Bāningu Hīrō (Terebi Bājon))
  - Lyrics: Kenta Harada
  - Composition, Arrangement, & Performance: Rey
  - Episodes: 1-29
- "Rescue Taisō" (レスキュー体操, Resukyū Taisō; "Rescue Exercises")
  - Lyrics & Composition: Hiroshi Kitadani
  - Arrangement: Yoshichika Kuriyama & Shiho Terada
  - Choreography: Hiromichi Sato
  - Artist: Hiroshi Kitadani
  - Episodes: 30-50
- "Rescue Fire" (レスキューファイアー, Resukyū Faiā)
  - Lyrics & Composition: Hironobu Kageyama
  - Arrangement: Masaki Suzuki
  - Artist: JAM Project
  - Episodes: 51

Insert songs

- "Rescue Dream!"
  - Lyrics: Kenta Harada
  - Composition: Shinya Tasaki
  - Arrangement & Performance: Rey
- "Three souls"
  - Lyrics & Composition: Hiroshi Kitadani
  - Arrangement: R·O·N
  - Artist: JAM Project
- "Rescue King" (レスキューキング, Resukyū Kingu)
  - Lyrics: Kenta Harada
  - Composition: Shinya Tasaki
  - Arrangement & Performance: Rey
- "Ide yo GaiaLeon" (いでよ ガイアレオン, Ide yo Gaiareon; "Come Forth GaiaLeon")
  - Lyrics & Composition: Masaaki Endoh
  - Arrangement: Hirofumi Miyake
  - Artist: Masaaki Endoh

Preceded by Rescue Force	Tomica Hero Series; 2009 – 2010	Succeeded by none
