= Tomica Hero: Rescue Force =

- Tomica Hero: Rescue Force title card from episode 45
- Genre: Tokusatsu
- Created by: Takara Tomy; Dentsu
- Written by: Shinichi Inotsume; Hiroyuki Kawasaki; Ryota Sakamaki; Yoichiro Ohashi; Reiko Yoshida; Takashi Yamada; Shinsuke Onishi; Takuya Masumoto; Mitsutaka Hirota
- Directed by: Masato Tsujino; Shorei Noma; Toshinori Daidoji; Hideki Oka; Akira Iwamoto; Junpei Shiokawa
- Starring: Kenta Izuka; Seigo Noguchi (Flame); Haruno; Emi Hasegawa; Hiroaki Iwanaga; Yu Hayami; Keiichi Wada
- Voices of: Yasuda Dai Circus; Chiwa Saitō; Daigo Nakayama
- Narrated by: Bunkō Ogata
- Opening theme: "STORY" by camino "THE LIFE (TV Version)" by camino
- Ending theme: "Kokoro Hakobu (TV Version)" by TRIPLANE "Arigatō" by Yusaku Kiyama "Harebare" by 2BACKKA
- Composer: Kei Wakakusa
- Country of origin: Japan
- No. of episodes: 51

Production
- Running time: 22 minutes

Original release
- Network: TV Aichi; TV Tokyo
- Release: April 5, 2008 – March 28, 2009

Related
- Tomica Hero: Rescue Fire

Tomica Hero: Rescue Force (トミカヒーロー レスキューフォース, Tomika Hīrō Resukyū Fōsu) is a Japanese tokusatsu television series that began airing April 5, 2008, on TV Aichi. It is the first Tomica Hero series based on Takara Tomy's Tomica toy car line. The characters use Tomica's Super Tools (スーパーツール, Sūpā Tsūru) and Super Vehicles (スーパービークル, Sūpā Bīkuru) to help save people from Super-Disasters and battle the evil causing them. It is the second tokusatsu series that Takara Tomy has been involved in following Madan Senki Ryukendo. It is directed by Masato Tsujino (辻野 正人, Tsujino Masato), and written by Shinichi Inotsume (猪爪 慎一, Inotsume Shin'ichi) and Hiroyuki Kawasaki (川崎 ヒロユキ, Kawasaki Hiroyuki), the same team behind Ryukendo. A film for Tomica Hero: Rescue Force was released in December 2008.

== Characters ==
=== The United Fire-Defense Agency/Rescue Force ===
The second-generation Rescue Force (レスキューフォース, Resukyū Fōsu) is a special Super-Disaster Response Team (超災害対応部隊, Chōsaigai Taiō Butai) in the United Fire-Defense Agency (世界消防庁, Sekai Shōbō Chō) or "UFDA", which is a branch of the Earth Federation (地球連邦, Chikyū Renpō). Based on the Hyper Rescue group, the Rescue Force is deployed to protect human lives from various disasters too extreme for normal rescue workers. By the time of Rescue Fire's formation, the Rescue Force is transferred to Europe branch. Normally stationed at the Rescue Phoenix (レスキューフェニックス, Resukyū Fenikkusu) in Tateishi City (楯石シティ, Tateishi Shiti), whenever the artificial satellite Rescue Eye (レスキューアイ, Resukyū Ai) detects a Super-Disaster, Rescue Phoenix switches from Fortress Mode (フォートレスモード, Fōtoresu Mōdo) to Flight Mode (フライトモード, Furaito Mōdo) to carry the Rescue Force and the best situational choice of the Rescue Vehicles to the disaster site. The Rescue Phoenix assumes Spiral Catapult Mode (スパイラルカタパルトモード, Supairaru Kataparuto Mōdo) upon landing, when launching the Core Striker Max. Each of the Rescue Force members has an orange suit, but they each have different colored armor.

- Hikaru Todoroki/R1 (轟 輝／Ｒ１, Todoroki Hikaru/Āru Wan): Donning blue armor, Hikaru was originally the hot-blooded rookie member of the Rescue Force. Within a year, he was transferred to the team from a special rescue academy for his excellence in emergency vehicle operations. Being in the Rescue Force was his childhood dream since his time in Kuresato where he met Ryuji, believing in saving lives as an absolute. Hikaru eventually finds his predecessor's failed project and succeeds in gaining a new form, R1 Max (Ｒ１マックス, Āru Wan Makkusu), which has a white suit with orange accents and translucent blue chest armor. At one point, while taking a vacation to Kiyoizawa, Hikaru crosses paths with the weather lady he saved, Kirara, and Ryuuji, who is volunteer working for the city. While saving one of the boys under Ryuji's care during the Kiyoizawa crisis, Hikaru reaffirms his vow to always save lives from Super Disasters no matter what, as well as inspiring the boy to join the Rescue Force when he grows up. Before the team goes their separate ways, Hikaru and company visit a school to talk about rescue until the Executives unintentionally cause a gas leak. Though affected by the gas, Hikaru regains his courage thanks to the Executives risking themselves. In the epilogue, Hikaru is the only active member of the current Rescue Force remaining before being transferred to Europe.
- Kyosuke Jinrai/R2 (陣雷 響助／Ｒ２, Jinrai Kyōsuke/Āru Tsū): Donning silver armor, Kyosuke is the trusted cheerful and easygoing member of the Rescue Force. Despite this personality, Kyosuke is always willing to risk himself for the successful completion of any rescue. Following the tornado incident, Kyosuke wishes to drive a Rescue Vehicle like Hikaru. After discovering the existence of the Rescue Saver, Kyosuke is assigned to be its driver after showing his stuff in the End Crisis Maker incident. Kyosuke showed that same spirit, along with his childhood skills as a sumo, to bring the Rescue Dozer out. He played sumo wrestling with his schoolmate, Yokozuna. After leaving the Rescue Force a month later, he joins a local fire department like his predecessor had.
- Rei Kozuki/R3 (香月 レイ／Ｒ３, Kōzuki Rei/Āru Surī): Donning red armor, Rei is the cool female member of the Rescue Force from the SAT who has a sense of duty and is excellent in martial arts, though she has a phobia of small animals. In time, she comes to understand that she needs to rescue not just people, but their smiles as well. She also likes to drive a Rescue Vehicle, attempting to get her Rescue Vehicle License during the Dark Aurora crisis when she was driving a dekotora with explosives out of harm's way. As a result, she learns that she needs to be as serious a driver as she is as a rescuer. During a Super Disaster, Rei meets a boy named Teppei and his father, a guidance counselor. When the father nearly dies with no-one nearby to help, she assists Teppei over the phone on how to save him. After leaving the Rescue Force, she serves as a training instructor of the UFDA rescue training school, and is living with Teppei and his father.
- Juri Shiraki/R4 (白木 寿里／Ｒ４, Shiraki Juri/Āru Fō): Donning white armor, Juri is the kindhearted gung-ho female member of the Rescue Force, specializing in medical rescue. When executing the Danger Zone Super Power (火事場のスーパーパワー, Kajiba no Sūpā Pawā), she displays herculean strength in desperate times. While in the fourth grade, Juri fell in love with a boy named Yuto Fukuzawa. She eventually meets him in present day, with Yuto offering her his hand in marriage. However, while on a rescue mission soon after hearing Yuto is endangered, Juri is devastated when she finds him to have become a petty coward instead of the prince she imagined. She is later visited by her grandfather who questioned her choice of livelihood and intended to take her back to Hakata. But though he accepts her choice, Juri understands her grandfather more and promises to visit him at a later time. After leaving the Rescue Force, she serves as an assistant to Captain General.
- Eiji Ishiguro/R5 (石黒 鋭二／Ｒ５, Ishiguro Eiji/Āru Faibu): Eiji is the captain of the Rescue Force, who makes the call for Final Rescues to be executed. He was an original member of the Rescue Force as the black armored R5, and rarely suits up in the present due to switching to a gruff and rash personality and acting without restraint until Hikaru snaps him out of it. When told that he would be transferred to the Euro branch in Paris to aid in the case of more natural Super-Disasters, Ishiguro originally considered making Kyosuke the new captain of Rescue Force. But prior to being heavily wounded by Sica in a sneak attack, Ishiguro made Hikaru his replacement instead. However, Ishiguro eventually turned down the position and resumed being the Rescue Force captain while unaware that he failed in the French written examination that was important to his transfer. In the epilogue, Eiji remains captain of the Rescue Force before being transferred to Europe. He has a brother named Eiichi who trained the Rescue Studies Squad, the children who want to be like the Rescue Force.
- Captain General (総司令, Sō Shirei): A higher up in the United Fire-Defense Agency and the original R4, her real name being Natsuno Nanbu (南部 奈津乃, Nanbu Natsuno), or "Nancy" (ナンシー, Nanshī) to her friends. Being the top of her class, she traveled aboard before returning to Japan to become a member of the first Rescue Force, gaining a habit of speaking English while on the front lines. After leaving the team, she studied to assume her current position, meeting soccer player King Era, whom she eventually married. Due to the UFDA responsibilities, she only manages to spend extensive time with her family once a year. She gives the mobilization order to the Rescue Force from UFDA headquarters, meeting the Rescue Force live when Eiji was depressed over his actions as R5. Later, around the time King retires from Soccer, she aids the Rescue Force against the last Zukcrane by suiting up into RU (ＲＵ, Āru Yū; meaning Universe), the original R4 suit with a red RU mark, silver accents on the chest and helmet, and a blue visor opposed to the standard yellow.
- Reiji Osakabe/R0 (刑部 零次／Ｒ０, Osakabe Reiji/Āru Zero; movie): The Director of the United Fire-Defense Agency (世界消防庁長官, Sekai Shōbō Chō Chōkan) who appears to aid the Rescue Force during the Mach Train incident. As R0, he dons golden armor over an orange suit with black lines. He uses the Rescue Zamber and the Zero Fire before they are added to the main group's arsenal. He also appears in Tomica Hero Rescue Fire.
- Naomi Okamura (岡村 尚美, Okamura Naomi; 6, 25, 38, 50): The original R3, she is the chief of United Fire-Defense Agency's System Development Department (システム開発部, Shisutemu Kaihatsu Bu), and is also the chief of United Fire-Defense Agency's Anti-android Research Section (対アンドロイド研究セクション, Tai Andoroido Kenkyū Sekushon) created to understand the Neo Thera.
- Ritsuko Kanzaki (神崎 律子, Kanzaki Ritsuko; 18, 25, 38, 42, 50): She is the chief of United Fire-Defense Agency's Technology Development Organization (技術開発局, Gijutsu Kaihatsu Kyoku), modifying the suits of R1-R4 to resist the residual waves of energy from the Terra Resetters and perfecting the R1 Max system.
- Bunji Saeki (佐伯 文治, Saeki Bunji; 21, 38-39): The head of United Fire-Defense Agency's vehicle maintenance, he considers the Rescue Vehicles his children. He kept the Rescue Dozer in storage until it made its first successive rescue.
- Professor Natsumemori (夏目森博士, Natsumemori Hakase): The creditable adviser of the United Fire-Defense Agency belonging to the International Rescue League (国際救助連盟, Kokusai Kyūjo Renmei). He considers himself the "father" of the Rescue Force, creating the arsenal they use. His son works as a part-time janitor at the United Fire-Defense Agency, posing as his father at one point to meet the Rescue Force out of his admiration for them.
- Satoru Yuki (結城 悟, Yūki Satoru; 42): A new Rescue Force cadet from the Main National 3rd Rescue Squad who arrives in the disaster site when the Rescue Force is in the middle of a rescue that overwhelms them. Being an elite to be sent to the Euro branch, Yuki is placed under Hikaru's guidance to undergo training. Feeling that he was better than Hikaru, Yuki was confused why Hikaru was in the Rescue Force until seeing him in action. He eventually left for France, taking Hikaru's goal to protect all lives and smiles to heart.
- Kai (カイ, Kai; 43): An AI being developed to aid the Rescue Force, he was raised by Rei to have a human mind and be full of passion. However, a rewriting of a flaw in Kai's programing resulting in a fear of death led to him being inflicted with a virus, causing him to activate the Defense System to trap everyone in the building. As the other Rescue Force members make their way into the research building, Rei attempts to contact Kai with his favorite book which he grew to hate because its title character chose to die. But after Rei explains the story's message behind its ending, Kai was about to free her and the others when Maen re-inflicts Kai to overload his core. Kai manages to regain enough control to let R1 Max shut him down for good.
- Kamiya (神谷, Kamiya; 48): The original R2 a decade ago, Kamiya attempted to rescue a family, saving only the son, Masaki, before being forced to deal with a Super Disaster as the rescue workers took over for him. But learning the family died with Masaki as the only survivor, Kamiya leaves the Rescue Force and becomes the head of the fire station of Shizuka Village. Overtime, Kamiya came to realize he made a difference preventing regular disasters, and helps Kyosuke learn the lesson.

=== Neo Terror ===
The Neo Terror (ネオテーラ, Neo Tēra) is an evil organization which causes Super-Disasters (超災害, Chō Saigai), working incognito until the events of episode 6 reveals their existence as the culprit of the disasters. Under its creator Daen, with Batsu pulling the strings, the Neo Thera exists to "reset the Earth". Their original base of operations is an air fortress that hides within the clouds until the time of Daen's death, now traveling across the country under Maen's leadership until she reveals herself as Batsu.

- Three Great Executives (三大幹部, San Dai Kanbu): They were created by Daen to carry out the task of destroying the Earth unnoticed until the End Crisis Maker incident where they are scrapped. However, Daen rebuilds the trio with new bodies more suited to fighting as well as later gaining the ability to assume human form. Since Daen's death, the executives use the Dark Commander that AI Daen left them to find their new master, Maen, who recharges them at every city they make their way towards. After acquiring the Omeganium for her, the Executives are unwillingly hot-wired into the Omega Zukcrane's systems until just prior to its destruction, when Maen sics them on Juri and Rei. However, the three are defeated by the girls' combo attack. Once learning of Maen's true identity, the trio is discarded as she had no need for them. The three are soon taken to the Rescue Force HQ, to allow the scientists to analyze Batsu from their memory. In the aftermath of the Batsu crisis, having been partially recharged, the Executives come back to life and break out of the Rescue Force HQ to find a battery charger, causing a fear-inducing gas that leaks in a nearby school and starts a fire within it. Losing their grip on reality, they chase after a girl whom they think to be Maen, scaring her onto the edge of the school's roof. They ask Hikaru to save her before they shut down, having realized that Maen is gone, and actually enjoying their first rescue. The three are later recharged and begin working for the UFDA under the Supreme Commander.
  - Maare (マール, Māru): She is a gynoid who performs strategic command as the leader of the three executives. She is armed with a whip and is able to create a barrier. She battles Kyosuke during the End Crisis incident, overpowering him until she is destroyed when her barrier collapsed in midst of the End Crisis Maker's destruction. She is later rebuilt with a fighting mode, New Maare (ニューマール, Nyū Māru), and intends to get payback from Kyosuke. In the series epilogue, Maare is recruited to the UFDA as head maid. Maare's name comes from the Japanese word for "circle" (丸, maru) and is symbolized by gold.
  - San (サーン, Sān): He is an intellectual officer type android who analyzes a situation, usually reading the Crisis Maker instruction sheet. Due to the Mt. Nanairo incident, the Rescue Force learns of his and Sica's existence. Using the data gathered by himself and the others, he creates the End Crisis Maker. He confronts R2, R3, and R4 when they make their way to End Crisis Maker, overwhelming R3 and R4 with his martial arts skill until they turn the tables and dump their detonating bombs on him while he is pinned under rubble. He is later rebuilt with a fighting mode, New San (ニューサーン, Nyū Sān), and is armed with twin daggers and a Zaansu Pickaxe. San attempts to steal the Resetter Stone from World Museum at East City, intending to use it to create a new strong Terra Resetter. But he drops it while taking his leave as the Terra Resetter he arrived on activates. San's name comes from the Japanese word for "triangle" (三角, sankaku) and is symbolized by silver.
  - Sica (シーカ, Shīka): He is a power type android with excellent strength and ironclad body defense. During the End Crisis Maker incident, Sica attempts to destroy the Rescue Turbo when R1 battles him, scrapping him with the Rescue Crusher's Mantis Impact. He is later rebuilt with a fighting mode, New Sica (ニューシーカ, Nyū Shīka), and is armed with knuckle weapons and a Gonsu Hammer. Being a big fan of boxing champ Daisuke Naito, Sica expresses some reluctance when Maen decides to put a Super-Disaster in Kurei City where Naito's match is to take place. He battles R1 in a Super-Disaster Title Match with the city at stake and Naito as a neutral witness, getting KO'd. He is also a fan of idol Eri Hasayama and owns all her albums, meeting her when he and others kidnapped Juri who was posing as Eri. Sica's name comes from the Japanese word for "square" (四角, shikaku) and is symbolized by copper.
- Axts (アクスト, Akusuto): The mass-produced android foot soldiers built by San to interfere with the Rescue Force and set up the Crisis Makers. They are later upgraded into armored New Axts (ニューアクスト, Nyū Akusuto). Three Great Executives' Axts have gold, silver, or copper lines, while Daen's Axts have red lines, and Maen's Axts have red lines, bunches, and ribbons.
- Daen (ダーエン, Dāen; 14-25): The golden masked leader of the Neo Thera, he is actually a human named Obuchi (大淵, Ōbuchi), the original R1 and Ishiguro's senpai. As a member of the original team, he was responsible for creating many of the vehicles and the failed R1 Max Development Program. In the middle of a rescue mission at a foreign lab researching a new energy, Obuchi learned the energy was to be used for military reasons and caused a man-made volcanic eruption that supposedly killed him. However, Obuchi survived and became an unknowing host to Batsu, who intensified his hatred of humans with a passion, as he sees that their polluting of the Earth is the reason for many of the disasters his team were formed for in the first place. Over the next decade, Daen creates the Neo Thera and sends the Crisis Makers to the Executives, until he eventually reveals himself and uses his knowledge of the present Rescue Force arsenal to have an early advantage over the new team, developing an interest in Hikaru for being the new R1. After a failed attempt to force Ishiguro to save him, though it meant the continued suffering of many, Daen uses his kidnapped former teammates to turn his base into a Giant Terra Resetter as well as repair his R1 suit, using it to target the Rescue Force one by one before attacking Ishiguro. But once he sees Hikaru succeed where he failed in achieving R1 Max form, Batsu leaves Obuchi's body. Attempting to redeem himself for his actions as Daen, Obuchi gives Ishiguro his cane before he sacrifices himself to take his base out of the atmosphere and activates the base's self-destruct mechanism. Through the cane, Obuchi's redemption and dream is realized with the birth of the Rescue Max system. Daen's name comes from the Japanese word for "ellipse" (楕円, daen).

=== Batsu ===
An ancient nanocomputer that existed on Earth for 600 million years, Batsu (バーツ, Bātsu; 25, 49-50) watched over the newly born planet until humanity came into being and disrupted the natural order. As he attempted to steer their actions in the guise of various deities, Batsu came to the conclusion that mankind must die so the Earth can be saved. In the form of a mermaid of light, Batsu enters Obuchi's body and amplifies the man's malice, giving him the means to create the Neo Thera. After Daen's defeat, Batsu left him and assumed the guise of Maen (マーエン, Māen; 28-49), a female solid hologram with a moody spoiled brat persona dressed in Gothic Lolita fashion. Claiming to be created by Daen, Maen uses the Executives to continue where Daen failed, making the call for a Zukcrane to be activated.

Upon defeat, Maen leaves for the next town with a new recharge for the Executives once they make it to her location to start anew. Maen eventually reveals herself to the Rescue Force during the Kurei City incident, suggesting a Super-Disaster Title Match with the promise to stop her attack on the city. However, she adds a second round involving the Zukcrane causing the disaster. Later at Academia City, Maen attempts to have her Zukcrane take out the Rescue Max in a diversion while the executives obtain the Omeganium she requested. Once getting it, she uses both it and them to complete her Omega Zukcrane to carry out her master plan. But the plan goes awry when she is forced to directly link up to her creation, going down when it is destroyed. Maen also aided the insane Mataro Madano/Dr. Mado, but regretted her choice of teaming up with a human when he screwed up.

Deciding to finish things and achieve her goal, Maen uses a mass firestorm to lure Super Rescue Max Crane into executing its Final Rescue, taking in enough energy to finally discard her guise and assume her true form as Batsu before scattering its being across the planet to commit global-scale genocide of the human race, while the main body remained in Japan with a barrier around it. Though the Great God Striker is able to pierce the barrier stop Batsu's plan, it was a step ahead of the UFDA's attempt with its unforeseen ability to regenerate from even the smallest remains making the battle seem hopeless. However, refusing to accept defeat, R1 and the Rescue Striker manage to enter Batsu's body and destroy it from the inside out.

Batsu's name comes from the Japanese word for "X" (バツ, batsu), seen by the cross mounted on its back, while Maen's name comes from the Japanese word for "circle" (真円, maen).

== Rescue Vehicles ==
=== Rescue Striker ===
The Rescue Striker (レスキューストライカー, Resukyū Sutoraikā) is R1's large-scale water truck Rescue Vehicle, which carries four small-scale Rescue Vehicles to the disaster site. By itself, the Rescue Striker's Final Rescue is called the Water Cannon (ウォーターキャノン, Wōtā Kyanon), in which it shoots a jet stream of water with freezing ability. The Rescue Striker can also execute Hyper Up with the medium-scale Rescue Vehicles for more power. The Rescue Striker forms the torso of both Rescue Max and Super Rescue Max, with the Core Striker as the robot's brain. It is destroyed in the final fight with Batsu, with a new one built a month later.

- Riser Striker (ライザーストライカー, Raizā Sutoraikā): A combination of the Rescue Striker with the Rescue Riser. Its Final Rescue is the Riser Splash (ライザースプラッシュ, Raizā Supurasshu), in which it shoots twin jet streams of freezing water at distant targets.
- Shovel Striker (ショベルストライカー, Shoberu Sutoraikā): A combination of the Rescue Striker with the Rescue Shovel. Its Final Rescue is a crash attack called the Shovel Crash (ショベルクラッシュ, Shoberu Kurasshu), in which its shovel claw pulls the target out away from any obstructions for easy dispatching.
- Drill Striker (ドリルストライカー, Doriru Sutoraikā): A combination of the Rescue Striker with the Rescue Drill. Its Final Rescue is called the Drill Boost (ドリルブースト, Doriru Būsto), which can drill through rock at high speed.
- Turbo Striker (ターボストライカー, Tābo Sutoraikā): A combination of the Rescue Striker with the Rescue Turbo. Its Final Rescue is called the Turbo Tornado (ターボトルネード, Tābo Torunēdo), which generates a tornado that counters any Super-Disaster.
- Dozer Striker (ドーザーストライカー, Dōzā Sutoraikā): A combination of the Rescue Striker with the Rescue Dozer. Its Final Rescue is called the Dozer Drive (ドーザードライブ, Dōzā Doraibu), which is able to crush anything between the jaws formed by the grill and dump bed of the Rescue Dozer.
- God Striker (ゴッドストライカー, Goddo Sutoraikā): A super large-scale Rescue Vehicle. A combination of the Rescue Striker with the Rescue Saver and five medium-scale Rescue Vehicles (sans Rescue Crane), created exclusively to deal with the Omega Zukcrane. However, the removal of mechanical restraints proved to be taxing on the vehicles to the point of engines breaking if the combination is not cancelled in time. Its Final Rescue is called the Striker Attack (ストライカーアタック, Sutoraikā Atakku), a self-sacrificing move that does not use a Rescue Card for execution.
- Great God Striker (グレートゴッドストライカー, Gurēto Goddo Sutoraikā): A super large-scale Rescue Vehicle. A combination of the Rescue Striker with the Rescue Saver, the Rescue Diver, and all six medium-scale Rescue Vehicles, created exclusively to deal with Batsu, and piloted by all five members of the Rescue Force. Its Super Final Rescue is Great Full Cannon (グレートフルキャノン, Gurēto Furu Kyanon).

=== Rescue Saver ===
The Rescue Saver (レスキューセイバー, Resukyū Seibā) is R2's large-scale all-terrain armored Rescue Vehicle. By itself, the Rescue Saver's Final Rescue is called the Flash Cannon (フラッシュキャノン, Furasshu Kyanon), in which it shoots a cannonball of freezing water. It is able to split into four smaller vehicles, and can execute "Rescue Combine" with the medium-scale Rescue Vehicles for more power. The Rescue Saver forms the limbs and head of Rescue Max.

- Riser Saver (ライザーセイバー, Raizā Seibā): A combination of the Rescue Saver with the Rescue Riser. Its Final Rescue is the Riser Splash, in which it shoots twin jetstreams of freezing water at distant targets.
- Shovel Saver (ショベルセイバー, Shoberu Seibā): A combination of the Rescue Saver with the Rescue Shovel. Its Final Rescue is a crash attack called Shovel Crash, in which its shovel claw pulls the target out away from any obstructions for easy dispatching.
- Drill Saver (ドリルセイバー, Doriru Seibā): A combination of the Rescue Saver with the Rescue Drill. Its Final Rescue is called the Drill Boost, which can drill through rock at high speed.
- Turbo Saver (ターボセイバー, Tābo Seibā): A combination of the Rescue Saver with the Rescue Turbo. Its Final Rescue is called the Turbo Tornado, which generates a tornado that counters any Super-Disaster.
- Dozer Saver (ドーザーセイバー, Dōzā Seibā): A combination of the Rescue Saver with the Rescue Dozer. Its Final Rescue is called the Dozer Drive, which is able to crush anything between the jaws formed by the grill and dump bed of Rescue Dozer.

=== Rescue Diver ===
The Rescue Diver (レスキューダイバー, Resukyū Daibā) is R2's new large-scale armored Rescue Vehicle, completed during the Mach Train incident, able to assume Drill Tank Mode (ドリルタンクモード, Doriru Tanku Mōdo) and Jet Mode (ジェットモード, Jetto Mōdo). By itself, the Rescue Diver's Final Rescue is called the Flash Drill (フラッシュドリル, Furasshu Doriru), in which it shoots eight freezing missiles. It is the successor vehicle of the Rescue Saver, based around its design, and forms most of Super Rescue Max. It is able separable into four smaller vehicles, and can execute "Rescue Combine" with the medium-scale Rescue Vehicles for more power. It is piloted by R5 during its appearances in Rescue Fire.

- Jet Vehicle Mode (ジェットビハイクルモード, Jetto Bihaikuru Mōdo): A combination of the Rescue Diver with the Rescue Striker outside of Super Rescue Max.
- Riser Diver (ライザーダイバー, Raizā Daibā): A combination of the Rescue Diver with the Rescue Riser. Its Final Rescue is Riser Splash, in which it shoots twin jetstreams of freezing water at distant targets.
- Shovel Diver (ショベルダイバー, Shoberu Daibā): A combination of the Rescue Diver with the Rescue Shovel. Its Final Rescue is a crash attack called Shovel Crash, in which its shovel claw pulls the target out away from any obstructions for easy dispatching.
- Drill Diver (ドリルセダイバー, Doriru Daibā): A combination of the Rescue Diver with the Rescue Drill. Its Final Rescue is called the Drill Boost, which can drill through rock at high speed.
- Turbo Diver (ターボダイバー, Tābo Daibā): A combination of the Rescue Diver with the Rescue Turbo. Its Final Rescue is called the Turbo Tornado, which generates a tornado that counters any Super-Disaster.
- Dozer Diver (ドーザーダイバー, Dōzā Daibā): A combination of the Rescue Diver with the Rescue Dozer. Its Final Rescue is called the Dozer Drive, which is able to crush anything between the jaws formed by the grill and dump bed of Rescue Dozer.

=== Rescue Max ===
The Rescue Max (レスキューマックス, Resukyū Makkusu) is a super large-scale humanoid robot created when the Rescue Striker and the Rescue Saver "Max Combine". Its design was developed by Obuchi before his change into Daen. However, learning that his cane contained Obuchi's designs, the UFDA secretly made the modifications on both the Striker and Saver vehicles during the lack of the Neo Thera activity until it resumed six months later. Its Final Rescue, the Max Cannon (マックスキャノン, Makkusu Kyanon), allows it to freeze the target before bursting it into pieces with its fists.

- Rescue Max Drill-Dozer (レスキューマックスドリルドーザー, Resukyū Makkusu Doriru-Dōzā): A combination of Rescue Max with one of Rescue Drill's side drills and the Rescue Dozer becoming shoulder armor. Its Final Rescue, the Max Blaster (マックスブラスター, Makkusu Burasutā), allows it to fling an opponent into the air and burst through it with the drill.

=== Super Rescue Max ===
The Super Rescue Max (スーパーレスキューマックス, Sūpā Resukyū Makkusu) is a robot created when the Rescue Striker and the Rescue Diver "Max Combine". Its Final Rescue is the Drill Blaster (ドリルブラスター, Doriru Burasutā), which freezes the target before bursting through it with the drill.

- Super Rescue Max Crane (スーパーレスキューマックスクレーン, Sūpā Resukyū Makkusu Kurēn): A combination of Super Rescue Max with the Rescue Crane. Its attacks are the Max Crane Thrust and the Super Max Kick. Its Final Rescue is the Super Max Blaster (スーパーマックスブラスター, Sūpā Makkusu Burasutā), in which it uses the drill to unleash a freeze wave before using the crane to pierce the frozen target. It then drags the target back so Super Rescue Max can finish the job with its drill.

=== Zero Fire ===
The Zero Fire (ゼロファイヤー, Zero Faiyā) is R5's super large-scale carrier Rescue Vehicle with a large container with the four Zero Fire Cannons (ゼロファイヤーキャノン, Zero Faiā Kyanon) which can carry five medium-scale Rescue Vehicles. It was originally R0's vehicle in the movie.

=== Medium-scale Rescue Vehicles ===
- Rescue Riser (レスキューライザー, Resukyū Raizā): A hook/ladder truck which throws water from the apex of the ladder.
- Rescue Shovel (レスキューショベル, Resukyū Shoberu): A drag shovel which can transform into Claw Mode (クローモード, Kurō Mōdo).
- Rescue Drill (レスキュードリル, Resukyū Doriru): A tank-like vehicle with twin drills and a cutoff saw on top.
- Rescue Turbo (レスキューターボ, Resukyū Tābo): A large green blower vehicle with a turbofan on it.
- Rescue Dozer (レスキュードーザー, Resukyū Dōzā): A black dump truck which can transform into Dozer Drive Mode (ドーザードライブモード, Dōzā Doraibu Mōdo) from Dump Mode (ダンプモード, Danpu Mōdo). Rescue Dozer is the most powerful of the five vehicles. Though the original Rescue Force was unable to use it due to safety concerns, Kyosuke managed to convince Bunji Saeki to deploy it.
- Rescue Crane (レスキュークレーン, Resukyū Kurēn): A skyblue crane.

=== Small-scale Rescue Vehicles ===
- Core Striker (コアストライカー, Koa Sutoraikā): A Nissan 300ZX police car with AI which is R1's personal car and serves as the cockpit of Rescue Striker. It refers to its driver as "New Face" and is amazed by Hikaru's unpredictable actions to save lives. Feeling that it couldn't keep up with Hikaru as a result, Core Striker asks Ishiguro to replace him. However, in a dangerous gamble, Ishiguro agrees to upgrade the Core Striker into the Core Striker Max (コアストライカーマックス, Koa Sutoraikā Makkusu), a Nissan 350Z, so it can continue to aid Hikaru, now referring to him by his code name R1. In this form, the Core Striker's speed is increased to reach speeds of 600 mph when it is launched through Rescue Phoenix's Spiral Catapult Mode. When its limiter is removed, the Core Striker Max reaches nearly dangerous speeds beyond 120% engine power. A second Core Striker frame is used by R3 to pilot the Great God Striker.
- Core Aider (コアエイダー, Koa Eidā): R4's Nissan Paramedic/Nissan Elgrand ambulance with AI and lifesaving machinery.
- Wave Search (ウエーブサーチ, Uēbu Sāchi): A driverless water truck for firefighting that also serves as a scout. Based on the Dual Fighter Dragon used by the Fire Rescue Task Forces of Tokyo Fire Department.
- Power Search (パワーサーチ, Pawā Sāchi): A driverless excavator for obstacle removing that also serves as a scout. Based on the Dual Fighter Saver used by the Fire Rescue Task Forces of Tokyo Fire Department.
- Core Saver (コアセイバー, Koa Seibā): A Nissan X-Trail police SUV with AI which is R2's personal car and serves as the cockpit of Rescue Saver. It is later upgraded into the Core Diver (コアダイバー, Koa Daibā) that serves as the cockpit of Rescue Diver. A second Core Saver frame is used by R4 to pilot the Great God Striker.
- Core Search (コアサーチ, Koa Sāchi): R3's personal Nissan Note with AI.
- Core Striker Captain (コアストライカーキャプテン, Koa Sutoraikā Kyaputen): A police car with AI which is R5's personal car and serves as the cockpit of Zero Fire. It is a vehicle entitled for use only by the Rescue Force's captain.
- Core Striker Fire (コアストライカーファイヤー, Koa Sutoraikā Faiyā): A police car with AI which is R0's personal car and serves as the cockpit of Zero Fire during the Mach Train incident. It also possesses its own Suit Up chamber that Reiji uses to become R0.

== Rescue Tools ==
=== Rescue Commander ===
The Rescue Commander (レスキューコマンダー, Resukyū Komandā) is an electronic pad used for reading Rescue Cards, communicating with the Rescue Phoenix, searching a disaster site, and transmitting data collected at a disaster site to the Rescue Phoenix.

=== Max Commander ===
The Max Commander (マックスコマンダー, Makkusu Komandā) is R1's personal electronic pad used to transform into R1 Max.

=== Rescue Card ===
The Rescue Cards (レスキューカード, Resukyū Kādo) are used by the Rescue Force, slashed through the Rescue Commander. While the Build Up (ビルドアップ, Birudo Appu) card (R1, R5) and the Change (チェンジ, Chenji) card (R2, R3, R4) are used by all members to suit up while in the Rescue Phoenix, R1 and R2 use the other cards to activate the mecha they use in their missions. The Max Up (マックスアップ, Makkusu Appu) card is used by R1, slashed through the Max Commander.

- Mantis Impact (マンティスインパクト, Mantisu Inpakuto): The powerful attack for the Rescue Crusher Mantis Mode.
- Whale Impact (ホエールインパクト, Hoēru Inpakuto): The powerful attack for the Rescue Crusher Whale Mode.
- Drill Impact (ドリルインパクト, Doriru Inpakuto): The powerful attack for the Drill Crusher.
- System Up (システムアップ, Shisutemu Appu): The Core Striker/Core Striker Max or the Rescue Striker are started up from the Rescue Phoenix.
- Hyper Up (ハイパーアップ, Haipā Appu): The Rescue Striker/Saver/Diver and the medium-scale Rescue Vehicles are combined.
- Max Hyper Up (マックスハイパーアップ, Makkusu Haipā Appu): The Rescue Striker and Rescue Saver/Diver are combined. The (Super) Rescue Max can reuse this card to combine with any medium-scale Rescue Vehicles.
- Open Up (オープンアップ, Ōpun Appu): All Rescue Vehicles are dispatched, with their combination limits removed.
- Rescue Phoenix (レスキューフェニックス, Resukyū Fenikkusu): The Rescue Phoenix is started up.
- Rescue Striker (レスキューストライカー, Resukyū Sutoraikā): The Rescue Striker is started up.
- Rescue Saver (レスキューセイバー, Resukyū Seibā): The Rescue Saver is started up.
- Rescue Diver (レスキューダイバー, Resukyū Daibā): The Rescue Diver is started up.
- Zero Fire (ゼロファイヤー, Zero Faiyā): The Zero Fire is started up.
- Rescue Riser (レスキューライザー, Resukyū Raizā): The Rescue Riser is started up.
- Rescue Shovel (レスキューショベル, Resukyū Shoberu): The Rescue Shovel is started up.
- Rescue Drill (レスキュードリル, Resukyū Doriru): The Rescue Drill is started up.
- Rescue Turbo (レスキューターボ, Resukyū Tābo): The Rescue Turbo is started up.
- Rescue Dozer (レスキュードーザー, Resukyū Dōzā): The Rescue Dozer is started up.
- Rescue Crane (レスキュークレーン, Resukyū Kurēn): The Rescue Crane is started up.
- Core Striker (コアストライカー, Koa Sutoraikā): The Core Striker is started up.
- Core Striker Max (コアストライカーマックス, Koa Sutoraikā Makkusu): The Core Striker Max is started up.
- Core Aider (コアエイダー, Koa Eidā): The Core Aider is started up.
- Wave Search (ウエーブサーチ, Uēbu Sāchi): The Wave Search is started up.
- Power Search (パワーサーチ, Pawā Sāchi): The Power Search is started up.
- Core Saver (コアセイバー, Koa Seibā): The Core Saver is started up.
- Core Diver (コアダイバー, Koa Daibā): The Core Diver is started up.
- Core Search (コアサーチ, Koa Sāchi): The Core Search is started up.
- Core Striker Captain (コアストライカーキャプテン, Koa Sutoraikā Kyaputen): The Core Striker Captain is started up.
- Core Striker Fire (コアストライカーファイヤー, Koa Sutoraikā Faiyā): The Core Striker Fire is started up.
- Water Cannon (ウォーターキャノン, Wōtā Kyanon): Final Rescue for the Rescue Striker.
- Flash Cannon (フラッシュキャノン, Furasshu Kyanon): Final Rescue for the Rescue Saver.
- Flash Drill (フラッシュドリル, Furasshu Doriru): Final Rescue for the Rescue Diver.
- Riser Splash (ライザースプラッシュ, Raizā Supurasshu): Final Rescue for the Riser Striker/Saver/Diver.
- Shovel Crash (ショベルクラッシュ, Shoberu Kurasshu): Final Rescue for the Shovel Striker/Saver/Diver.
- Drill Boost (ドリルブースト, Doriru Būsto): Final Rescue for the Drill Striker/Saver/Diver.
- Turbo Tornado (ターボトルネード, Tābo Torunēdo): Final Rescue for the Turbo Striker/Saver/Diver.
- Dozer Drive (ドーザードライブ, Dōzā Doraibu): Final Rescue for the Dozer Striker/Saver/Diver.
- Max Cannon (マックスキャノン, Makkusu Kyanon): Final Rescue for the Rescue Max.
  - Freezing Cannon (フリージングキャノン, Furījingu Kyanon): Final Rescue for the Rescue Max/Rescue Phoenix combo. Uses the "Max Cannon" card.
- Max Blaster (マックスブラスター, Makkusu Burasutā): Final Rescue for the Rescue Max Drill-Dozer.
- Drill Blaster (ドリルブラスター, Doriru Burasutā): Final Rescue for the Super Rescue Max.
- Super Max Blaster (スーパーマックスブラスター, Sūpā Makkusu Burasutā): Final Rescue for the Super Rescue Max Crane.
- Unleaded Hyper Hi-Oct (アンレデッハイパーハイオクト, Anrededo Haipā Haiokuto): Summons Rescue Striker to refuel Core Striker Max.
- Upgraded Rescue Shovel: Summons the upgraded Red Rescue Shovel. It is only seen in Rescue Fire.
- Upgraded Rescue Drill: Summons the upgraded black Rescue Drill. It is only seen in Rescue Fire.
- Upgraded Rescue Turbo: Summons the upgraded Red Rescue Turbo. It is only seen in Rescue Fire.
- Upgraded Rescue Dozer: Summons the upgraded blue Rescue Dozer. It is only seen in Rescue Fire.
- Upgraded Rescue Crane:Summons the upgraded green Rescue Crane. It is only seen in Rescue Fire.

=== Rescue Breaker ===
The Rescue Breaker (レスキューブレイカー, Resukyū Bureikā) is the common rescue tool of the Rescue Force with eight modes, usually kept in Mobile Mode (モバイルモード, Mobairu Mōdo): until needed.

- Break Hammer (ブレイクハンマー, Bureiku Hanmā): Hammer mode. R1 mainly uses it.
- Break Ax (ブレイクアックス, Bureiku Akkusu): Ax mode. R2 mainly uses it.
- Break Pick (ブレイクピック, Bureiku Pikku): Pick mode. R3 mainly uses it.
- Break Hand (ブレイクハンド, Bureiku Hando): Manipulator mode. R4 mainly uses it.
- Break Drill (ブレイクドリル, Bureiku Doriru): Drill mode.
- Break Shot (ブレイクショット, Bureiku Shotto): Simple information analysis mode that can also be used as a digital camera.
- Break Rope (ブレイクロープ, Bureiku Rōpu): Rope mode.

=== Rescue Crusher ===
The Rescue Crusher (レスキュークラッシャー, Resukyū Kurasshā) is a powerful rescue tool with three modes, usually kept in Trunk Mode (トランクモード, Toranku Mōdo) until needed. The Rescue Commanders can be installed onto the Rescue Crushers in their other two modes so they can use Rescue Cards, and its mode is called a Special Mode (スペシャルモード, Supesharu Mōdo).

- Mantis Mode (マンティスモード, Mantisu Mōdo): Engine Cutter mode. Its attack is Mantis Impact (マンティスインパクト, Mantisu Inpakuto).
- Whale Mode (ホエールモード, Hoēru Mōdo): Spray mode. Its attack is Whale Impact (ホエールインパクト, Hoēru Inpakuto).
- Drill Crusher (ドリルクラッシャー, Doriru Kurasshā): A combination weapon formed by attaching the Break Drill to the Rescue Crusher.

=== Max Divider ===
The Max Divider (マックスディバイダー, Makkusu Dibaidā) is R1 Max's gauntlet-type rescue tool with three modes. It has red, blue, and green buttons, and generates the ability of flame, ice, and wind.

- Divider Mode (ディバイダーモード, Dibaidā Mōdo): Circular saw mode. Its attacks are Flame Divider (フレイムディバイダー, Fureimu Dibaidā), Aqua Divider (アクアディバイダー, Akua Dibaidā), and Sonic Divider (ソニックディバイダー, Sonikku Dibaidā).
- Drill Mode (ドリルモード, Doriru Mōdo): Used to get past debris obstructions when other tools cannot open the closed entry.
- Sword Mode (ソードモード, Sōdo Mōdo): Used for close combat and to fend off enemies.

=== Rescue Zamber ===
The Rescue Zamber (レスキューザンバー, Resukyū Zanbā) is a rescue tool originally used by R0 before being used by the main Rescue Force. It has two modes:

- Haken Mode (ハーケンモード, Hāken Mōdo)
- Javelin Mode (ジャベリンモード, Jaberin Mōdo)

== Disaster Generating Devices ==
Disaster Generating Devices (災害発生メカ, Saigai Hassei Meka) are used by the Neo Thera to cause disasters to reset the Earth from humanity's machinations.

- Crisis Maker (クライシスメーカー, Kuraishisu Mēkā; 1-13, 44-49): The first type of Disaster Generating Device, the Crisis Makers, each with a unique calamity to create a "Super-Disaster", land on Earth for Maare and her group to get with an instruction sheet included. The last Crisis Maker, the End Crisis Maker (エンドクライシスメーカー, Endo Kuraishisu Mēkā; 13), was created by San using data of previous Crisis Makers stored within himself and the other executives. As a result of the data, the End Crisis Maker is capable of causing numerous Super-Disasters before being destroyed by Turbo Striker's Turbo Tornado. After losing all the Zukcrane, the Crisis Makers are reused by Maen in her final series of plans, upgraded to create physical forms from the elements themselves.
- Terra Resetter (テラリセッター, Tera Risettā; 14-25): Daen's personal Disaster Generating Devices, relaying commands from his fortress as it reforms an area into a desert. Each Terra Resetter has an alternate purpose as its residual waves damage the Rescue Suits overtime until they are modified to resist it. Daen eventually attaches all his remaining Terra Resetters onto his fortress, making it a giant Terra Resetter with enough power to turn 50% of Earth into a desert. However, once returned to normal, Daen uses the base's self-destruct to destroy it after getting it above the atmosphere.
- AI Daen (ＡＩダーエン, Ē Ai Dāen; 25-27): The AI of Obuchi's black limo-like Core Striker, possessing all of Daen's thought patterns but none of his creator's humanity. Taking over after its master died, AI Daen begins a six-month planning phase while having the Three Great Executives to gather materials in order to create a black-version of the Rescue Striker for him to personally pilot, called the Dark Striker (ダークストライカー, Dāku Sutoraikā). Once complete, AI Daen lures out the Rescue Force, making sure everything goes to plan as he uses R5's impulses to summon all five medium-scale Rescue Vehicles of the Rescue Force, combining with them all into one vehicle to destroy the Rescue Force. However, AI Daen didn't count on the appearance of Rescue Max and is unable to calculate the abilities of the robot as its combination is canceled and the Dark Striker is obliterated by Max Cannon. However, AI Daen leaves the Executives with the Dark Commander.
- Crisis Cards (クライシスカード, Kuraishisu Kādo; 28-38, 40-42, 44-45): Cards that are used by the Executives, slashed through the Dark Commander (ダークコマンダー, Dāku Komandā) to relay a command to the Zukcrane below to carry out the disaster the card represents.
  - Megaton Crisis (メガトンクライシス, Megaton Kuraishisu): Summons a Zukcrane, a Hard-type, or a Flight Model.
  - End Megaton Crisis (エンドメガトンクライシス, Endo Megaton Kuraishisu) Summons the Omega Zukcrane.
  - Magnet Crisis (マグネットクライシス, Magunetto Kuraishisu; 28): Activates a magnetic field to wreck all metal objects in its path.
  - Aurora Crisis (オーロラクライシス, Ōrora Kuraishisu; 29): Produces a Dark Aurora that incinerates anything caught in its path.
  - Sonic Crisis (ソニッククライシス, Sonikku Kuraishisu; 30): Uses a giant fight bell to cause buildings to collapse via sound waves.
  - Wind Crisis (ウィンドクライシス, Windo Kuraishisu; 32): Uses the nearby fans to invoke winds as strong as hurricanes or generate blade-like gusts.
  - Bubble Crisis (バブルクライシス, Baburu Kuraishisu; 33): Conjures bubbles created from a special liquid that explode on contact.
  - Microwave Crisis (マイクロウェーブクライシス, Maikurowēbu Kuraishisu; 34): Allows Maen to hack into the Pilon Corp Development Department's Microwave Electric Transmitter, activating the Microwave Cannon and rewriting the system to attack people.
  - Plant Crisis (プラントクライシス, Puranto Kuraishisu; 35): Activates a chalkboard that scratches itself, creating a sound that kills plant life. Though the Executives accidentally ripped the card in two and fixed it, the card only affects vegetables and places Vegataria City in a state of crisis. By the time it is found, R1 Max and R3 use Shovel Striker and Dozer Saver to bring the blackboard topside and smash it.
  - Magma Crisis (マグマクライシス, Maguma Kuraishisu; 36): Activates a Zukcrane that uses a nail gun to penetrate the crust under Academia City to bring magma to the surface to cover the city. Used to bring the Rescue Force to the scene and bring out Rescue Max, the Zukcrane managed to get the rescue mecha to fall for its trap and fall towards the magma. However, with the Rescue Phoenix's aid, the Rescue Max escapes and scraps the Zukcrane.
- Zukcrane (ズッケイン, Zukkein; 28-38, 40-42, 45): A Super-Disaster Machine, based on the technology of the Rescue Vehicles and summoned by the "Megaton Crisis" Crisis Card as a last resort. Each Zukcrane model has a unique crisis-causing ability that it dangles until the Rescue Max disables it, leaving it defenseless to a Final Rescue. During the Kachikachi Bacteria incident, Maen uses a special Zukcrane model called the Zukcrane Hard Type (ズッケインハードタイプ, Zukkein Hādo Taipu; 31), which is covered in the stiffness-inducing bacteria, rendering its body hard as stone with its joints waxed to give it movement. Only Rescue Max Drill Dozer had the power to scrap this advanced model. Acquiring the Omeganium as an energy source, Maen uses it to power the strongest model, the Omega Zukcrane (オメガズッケイン, Omega Zukkein; 37-38), that is built to cause all volcanoes of the world to erupt by targeting convergences of magma. Starting at Suzukura to take out Japan, the Omega Zukcrane surfaces after the Rescue Max Drill Dozer scraps the two Zukcranes holding if off. The Omega Zukcrane easily overpowers the Rescue Max in the first round, provoking the Earth Federation to use an X0 Missile to stop it before it could drill into Suzaku Mountain. But after getting Rei and Juri out of it with the Rescue Saver, Hikaru forms the God Striker which overloads the Omeganium before scraping the Omega Zukcrane. A series of Flight Model Zukcranes (飛行型ズッケイン, Hikōgata Zukkein; 40-42, 45) were later built to counter the Rescue Diver, only for each to be scrapped by the Super Rescue Max. The last Flight Model Zukcrane is equipped with a special hard-drying cement that is near unbreakable. Though it came close to taking out the Super Rescue Max Crane, Zero Fire's debut ended with the machine being scrapped.
- Metal Train (メタルトレイン, Metaru Torein; movie): A train built by Mataro Madono. Its designs were originally considered as a template for the Mach Train, but Nouvelle Ginza turned them down. Forging an alliance with the Neo Thera and donning the name "Doktor Madu", Madono hijacks the Mach Train with the intent of causing a train wreck strong enough to level the city where Nouvelle Ginza's main branch is located. Once the Rescue Force manages to get the Mach Train passengers to safety, Rescue Striker and Rescue Diver combine into Jet Vehicle Mode to pursue the Metal Train. The Metal Train releases its hold on the Mach Train to assume its Snake Train (スネークトレイン, Sunēku Torein) mode in an attempt to overpower the Rescue Force before attacking the city. However, Jet Vehicle Mode reconfigures into Super Rescue Max to turn the tables, using Drill Blaster to shatter the Snake Train. Doktor Madu evades death, but is subsequently handed over to the Akebono authorities.
- Kaen (カエン, kaen; 7, 42, 48): A fire-based life form originally created by San to attack the headquarters for World Financial Services Agency.
- Yuruyuru Bacteria (ユルユル菌, Yuruyuru Kin; 9): A bacteriological weapon created by San to disassemble metal-based things it infects from the inside out, having a side effect that has infected humans move in slow motion before a vaccine is developed to kill off the bacteria. A new strain of the bacteria, Yuruyuru Bacteria 2 (ユルユル菌２, Yuruyuru Kin Tsū; 22), is later introduced on those gathered for the Asia Counter-Super-Disaster Summit, infecting only humans in the form of chills, fever, and diarrhea before becoming fatal within an hour. Though a vaccine was developed to cure the infected, the remaining Yuruyuru Bacteria 2 gathers within a mountain and converges into a giant monster that attempts to cause a landslide until Rescue Saver and Drill Striker destroy it.
- Kachikachi Bacteria (カチカチ菌, Kachikachi Kin; 31): A bacteriological weapon created by Maen to stiffen anything thing it infects from humans to machines except wax. Maare uses the Dark Commander to spread them across the city in hopes of freezing the Rescue Force in place before they can begin the actual Super-Disaster. However, R1 and R2 manage to spread the vaccine across the city and cure the infected.
- Microwave Cannon (マイクロウェーブキャノン, Maikurowēbu Kyanon; 34): Secretly built by the Pilon Corporation to be the first of their manufactured weapons, it is activated by Maen when she hacks into the Development Department. Until Maare's control, she uses the Cannon to try and take out the Rescue Max while it is saving the people underneath the building. Once given the word, the Rescue Max Drill Dozer scraps the Microwave Cannon.
- Kumanomi Bacteria (クマノミ菌, Kumanomi Kin; 44): A bacteriological weapon created by Maen based on Clownfish DNA that turns infected men into women and thus removes humanity's ability to procreate. As part of a test at Kazaki Park, they turn Hikaru and Kyosuke into women. With the rest of the test a complete success, Maare activates the End Crisis Maker to spread the virus across the city with Ishiguro among the inflicted. With Hikaru and Kyosuke too feminine to be of any help, Rei and Juri pilot the Super Rescue Max as the virus takes the form of a giant monster clownfish. Once the monster is killed and the Crisis Maker is destroyed, Rei disburses the vaccine to return all the feminized men back to normal.
- Geyser Dragon (46): A monster made of geyser water formed by the water orb containing a Crisis Maker, it overwhelms the Super Rescue Max Crane during the Kiyoizawa incident until its core is destroyed by the robot.
- Plasma man (47): A monster made of plasma energy remote controlled by a Crisis Maker, able to fry any electric-based machine on touch. Though it ran off when the Executives accidentally lost the directions to the Crisis Maker, the Plasma Man resumed its attack at Nouveau Tokyo area where Teppei and his dad were going to take the Mach Train. It is then destroyed by the Super Rescue Max.
- Gas (51): Unintentionally released into a school by the drained Executives, the gas affects people by playing on their fears. The gas is eventually neutralized by the Rescue Striker as it starts to manifest in the atmosphere.

== Episodes ==
1. Final Rescue Approved: Explosive Suppression Complete! (ファイナルレスキュー承認 爆鎮完了！, Fainaru Resukyū Shōnin: Bakuchin Kanryō!)
2. The Enemy is the Sun: Explosively Suppress It! (敵は太陽だ 爆裂的に鎮圧せよ！, Teki wa Taiyō da: Bakuretsuteki ni Chin'atsu seyo!)
3. Rescue Shovel Launch (レスキューショベル発進せよ, Resukyū Shoberu Hasshin seyo)
4. Protect the Hometown: Riser Striker (古里を守れ ライザーストライカー, Furusato o Mamore: Raizā Sutoraikā)
5. Hikaru, Save Juri: Electromagnetic Snake (ヒカル、寿里を助けろ 電磁の大蛇, Hikaru, Juri o Tasukero: Denji no Daija)
6. The Children and Rei: Bridging the Rainbow (子どもたちはレイが 虹の架け橋, Kodomo-tachi wa Rei ga: Niji no Kakehashi)
7. Kyosuke in Jeopardy: Break the Vault Open (響助ピンチ かたい扉をこじあけろ, Kyōsuke Pinchi: Katai Tobira o Kojiakero)
8. Core Striker: Believe in Your Teammates (コアストライカー 信じあう仲間, Koa Sutoraikā: Shinji au Nakama)
9. Drill Striker: Turn the Screw of the Heart (ドリルストライカー 心のネジを回せ, Doriru Sutoraikā: Kokoro no Neji o Mawase)
10. Everyone's Spirit in the Relay (みんなでたましいをリレーせよ, Minna de Tamashii o Rirē seyo)
11. The Professor Appears: Rescue Special Lecture (はかせ登場 レスキュー特別講義, Hakase Tōjō: Resukyū Tokubetsu Kōgi)
12. The Weatherwoman's Depression (お天気おねえさんのゆううつ, Otenki Oneesan no Yūutsu)
13. Give a Complete Explosive Suppression: The Promised Attack (爆鎮完了を教えてくれ 約束の一撃, Bakuchin Kanryō o Oshietekure: Yakusoku no Ichigeki)
14. A New Enemy: Will Kyosuke Make it in Time? (新たな敵だ まにあうのか響助, Arata na Teki da: Ma ni Au no ka Kyōsuke)
15. What Happened Hikaru? No Striker Today (どうしたヒカル ストライカーのない日, Dōshita Hikaru: Sutoraikā no Nai Hi)
16. Rei and Juri: Danger Zone Friendship Power (レイと寿里 火事場の友情パワー, Rei to Juri: Kajiba no Yūjō Pawā)
17. I Want to See the Happiness in Your Face: Every Soul (よろこぶ顔が見たい それぞれの魂, Yorokobu Kao ga Mitai: Sorezore no Tamashii)
18. The Rookie or the Great Veteran? R5 Enters (新人それとも大先輩？ Ｒ５登場, Shinjin soretomo Daisenpai? Āru Faibu Tōjō)
19. The Captain General's Concern: Crashing Commander Ishiguro (総司令の心配 突貫する石黒隊長, Sōshirei no Shinpai: Tokkan suru Ishiguro Taichō)
20. Remember the Glass Slipper? Juri's First Love (ガラスのくつを覚えてますか？ 寿里の初恋, Garasu no Kutsu o Oboetemasu ka? Juri no Hatsukoi)
21. Kyosuke's Partner: Rescue Dozer (響助のあいぼう レスキュードーザー, Kyōsuke no Aibō: Resukyū Dōzā)
22. Look! This is the New Core Striker (見よ これが新たなコアストライカー, Miyo Kore ga Arata na Koa Sutoraikā)
23. Hikaru and Rei Lose Their Way: The Strange Mansion (ヒカルとレイが迷い込んだ ふしぎな館, Hikaru to Rei ga Mayoikonda: Fushigi na Yakata)
24. Daen's Trap: Look out Captain Ishiguro! (ダーエンのわな 危うし石黒隊長, Dāen no Wana: Ayaushi Ishiguro Taichō)
25. Max Suit-Up Complete! The New R1 (マックス着装完了！ 新たなるＲ１, Makkusu Chakusō Kanryō! Aratanaru Āru Wan)
26. The Demon Director Appears: Rescue the Filming (オニ監督登場 レスキュー映画撮影, Oni Kantoku Tōjō: Resukyū Eiga Satsuei)
27. The Ultimate Combination! Enter Rescue Max (究極合体！ レスキューマックス出場, Kyūkyoku Gattai! Resukyū Makkusu Shutsujō)
28. Daen's Daughter: It's Maen (ダーエンの娘 マーエンなのダー, Dāen no Musume: Māen nano dā)
29. I Wanna Ride, Too: Rei's Large Scale Rescue (私も乗りたい レイの大型レスキュー, Watashi mo Noritai: Rei no Ōgata Resukyū)
30. Champ Naito Appears: The Spirit of the Gong Resounds (チャンプ内藤登場 魂のゴングを鳴らせ, Chanpu Naitō Tōjō: Tamashii no Gongu o Narase)
31. Beat the Kachikachi Bacteria: Drill Dozer (カチカチキンに負けるな ドリルドーザー, Kachikachi Kin ni Makeru na: Doriru Dōzā)
32. Why did You Come? Martial Artist Grandfather (どうしてきたの？ 武道家じいちゃん, Dō shite Kita no? Budōka Jii-chan)
33. Vehicle Exchange? Explosive Collective Break! (ビークル交換？ 息をあわせて爆鎮だ！, Bīkuru Kōkan? Iki o Awasete Bakuchin da!)
34. We Fight Only to Save Lives (戦いはあくまで人命救助のために, Tatakai wa Akumade Jinmei Kyūjo no Tame ni)
35. The Vegetables have Disappeared in a Super-Disaster: What Can You Do? (超災害で野菜が消えた 君ならどうする？, Chō Saigai de Yasai ga Kieta: Kimi nara Dō suru?)
36. Scramble! Rescue the Rescue Max (緊急発進！ レスキューマックスを救出せよ, Kinkyū Hasshin!: Resukyū Makkusu o Kyūshutsu seyo)
37. Hikaru is the Captain? Two Zukcranes Appear (ヒカルが隊長？ そして２台のズッケイン, Hikaru ga Taichō? Soshite Nidai no Zukkein)
38. Decisive Battle! God Striker Wins (決戦！ 勝負はゴッドストライカー, Kessen! Shōbu wa Goddo Sutoraikā)
39. Welcome the Rescue Diver: Farewell, Commander Ishiguro (ようこそレスキューダイバー さよなら石黒隊長, Yōkoso Resukyū Daibā: Sayonara Ishiguro Taichō)
40. Two Juris? I Want to Rescue the Idol (寿里がふたり？ アイドルだってレスキューしたい, Juri ga Futari? Aidoru datte Resukyū shitai)
41. The Captain's Brother Appears: Hyper Rescue Special Feature (隊長の兄登場 ハイパーレスキュー大特集, Taichō no Ani Tōjō: Haipā Resukyū Daitokushū)
42. Hikaru gets a Student at Last: This is My Life (とうとうヒカルに後輩が これがオレの生き方だ, Tōtō Hikaru ni Kōhai ga: Kore ga Ore no Ikikata da)
43. Thank You Rei: The Fox's Story is Unforgettable (ありがとうレイ キツネの話は忘れない, Arigatō Rei: Kitsune no Hanashi wa Wasurenai)
44. Kyosuke Heartbroken: Who is the Number One Bro? (響助がっくり アニキ度ナンバー１はだれ？, Kyōsuke Gakkuri: Aniki-do Nanbā Wan wa Dare?)
45. The Captain General Suits Up! The New Vehicle and RU (総司令が着装！ 新ビークルとＲＵ, Sō Shirei ga Chakusō! Shin Bīkuru to Āru Yū)
46. Never Change Hikaru: The Year Long Rescue Spirit (ヒカルは変わらない 年中無休レスキュー魂, Hikaru wa Kawaranai: Nenjū Mukyū Resukyū Damashii)
47. Hurry Rei: Save the Bond Between Parent and Child (いそげレイ 親子のきずなを救え, Isoge Rei: Oyako no Kizuna o Sukue)
48. What to do About Kyosuke: Another R2 (どうする響助 もうひとりのＲ２, Dō suru Kyōsuke: Mō Hitori no Āru Tsū)
49. Maen's Trump Card: The Entrapped Max (マーエンの切り札 わなにおちたマックス, Māen no Kirifuda: Wana ni Ochita Makkusu)
50. The Final Battle! All Vehicles Combine (最終決戦！ すべてのビークルを合体せよ, Saishū Kessen! Subete no Bīkuru o Gattai seyo)
51. You are Tomorrow's Rescue Force (キミがあしたのレスキューフォースだ, Kimi ga Ashita no Resukyū Fōsu da)

== Rescue the Mach Train! ==
Tomica Hero: Rescue Force Explosive Movie: Rescue the Mach Train! (トミカヒーロー レスキューフォース 爆裂ＭＯＶＩＥ マッハトレインをレスキューせよ！, Tomika Hīrō Resukyū Fōsu Bakuretsu Mūbī Mahha Torein o Resukyū seyo!) opened in theaters on December 20, 2008. Taking place between episodes 38 and 39, the film features guest stars Hiroshi Fujioka (藤岡 弘、, Fujioka Hiroshi,) as Reiji Osakabe, the Director of the UFDA and R0 (wearing an orange & black suit with yellow highlights & a gold armor, with a red visor; and Ryota Yamasato (山里 亮太, Yamasato Ryōta) of Nankai Candies (南海キャンディーズ, Nankai Kyandīzu) as Doctor Maddo/Mataro Madano (ドクトル・マドゥ／真殿 麻太郎, Dokutoru Maddo/Madano Matarō),Doctor Kokoi Son who joins forces with the Neo Thera to hijack the super express train Mach Train with his Metal Train Laughing like an wicked spirit evil spirit evil ghost devil villain momster vampire skeleton, intending to use the Mach Train in the most Super-Disaster ever. Kinuyo Kodama (児玉 絹世, Kodama Kinuyo) plays Miyuki Maijima (舞島 美有紀, Maijima Miyuki), a high school student who befriends the Rescue Force and is later trapped with the other civilians during the hijacking. Cameo guest stars include Shogo Yamaguchi (山口 翔吾, Yamaguchi Shōgo), Gen (源, Gen), Kohei Kuroda (黒田 耕平, Kuroda Kōhei), and Ryota Sato (佐藤 亮太, Satō Ryōta) reprising roles from Madan Senki Ryukendo; Takao Handa (飯田 孝男, Handa Takao) as a ferryman; Gajiro Sato (佐藤 蛾次郎, Satō Gajirō) as Gajiro's father; and camino as customers in yakitori restaurant. The short Explosive Run! Tomica Hero Grand Prix (爆走！トミカヒーローグランプリ, Bakusō! Tomika Hīrō Guran Puri) was shown alongside the film.

== Cast ==
- Hikaru Todoroki/R1: Kenta Izuka (猪塚 健太, Izuka Kenta)
- Kyosuke Jinrai/R2: Seigo Noguchi (野口 征吾, Noguchi Seigo) (FLAME)
- Rei Kozuki/R3: Haruno (はるの, Haruno)
- Juri Shiraki/R4, Eri Haseyama: Emi Hasegawa (長谷川 恵美, Hasegawa Emi)
- Eiji Ishiguro/R5: Hiroaki Iwanaga (岩永 洋昭, Iwanaga Hiroaki)
- Captain General/RU: Yu Hayami (早見 優, Hayami Yū)
- Obuchi/Daen (Voice): Keiichi Wada (和田 圭市, Wada Keiichi)
- Maare (Voice): Kuro-chan (クロちゃん, Kuro-chan) (Yasuda Dai Circus)
- San (Voice): Danchō (団長, Danchō) (Yasuda Dai Circus)
- Sica (Voice): HIRO (Yasuda Dai Circus)
- Maen, Dark Commander (Voice): Chiwa Saitō (斎藤 千和, Saitō Chiwa)
- Batsu (Voice): Keikō Sakai (酒井 敬幸, Sakai Keikō)
- Core Striker, Core Saver, Rescue Commander (Voice): Daigo Nakayama (中山 大吾, Nakayama Daigo)
- Narrator: Bunkō Ogata (緒方 文興, Ogata Bunkō)
- Sushmita Mukherjee as Doctor kokoi/Dr kokoi the mad professor female woman great genius extremely brilliant scientist influential mechanical engineer Doctor Maddo’s/Dr Maddo’s/Mataro Madano’s/Madano Mataro’s son
- Ryota Yamasato as Doctor Maddo/Dr Maddo the mad professor great genius extremely brilliant scientist influential mechanical engineer Mataro Madano/Professor Madano Mataro Doctor kokoi’s/Dr kokoi’s Son/Doctor Jalajamma’s/Dr Jalajamma’s Son
- Subhashini as Doctor Jalajamma/Dr Jalajamma the mad professor female mother aunty great genius extremely brilliant scientist influential mechanical engineer Professor Madano Mataro’s/Mataro Madano’s/Doctor Maddo’s/Dr Maddo’s/Doctor Kokoi’s/Dr Kokoi’s Son

=== Guest Actors ===
- Naomi Okamura: Sayuri Shirai (白井 小百合, Shirai Sayuri)
- Ritsuko Kanzaki: Naoko Watanabe (渡辺 奈緒子, Watanabe Naoko)
- Bunji Saeki: Shihou Harumi (春海 四方, Harumi Shihō)
- Ryuji: Kōsuke Kujirai (鯨井 康介, Kujirai Kōsuke)
- Kirara Amamiya: Nao Nagasawa (長澤 奈央, Nagasawa Nao)

=== Suit actors ===
- R1: Koya Nakashima (中島 厚也, Nakashima Kōya)
- R2: Teruo Yamaguchi (山口 照雄, Yamaguchi Teruo)
- R3: Masaru Shibue (渋江 勝, Shibue Masaru)
- R4, Maare: Rio Taura (田浦 リオ, Taura Rio)
- R4: Minami Taguchi (田口 南, Taguchi Minami)
- R5, R2: Suguru Onaga (翁長 卓, Onaga Suguru)
- San: Masaki Inoue (井上 雅稀, Inoue Masaki)
- Sica: Takeshi Matsui (松井 武士, Matsui Takeshi)
- Maen: Izumi Moriguchi (森口 泉, Moriguchi Izumi)

== Songs ==
Opening themes

- "STORY"
  - Lyrics: HAYATO/TAKA
  - Composition: KIKU
  - Arrangement: camino
  - Artist: camino
  - Episodes: 1-26
  The single for "STORY" included the "TV edit" for the song as well as a full-length version of the song with different lyrics.
- "THE LIFE (TV Version)" (THE LIFE（ＴＶバージョン）, Za Raifu (Terebi Bājon))
  - Lyrics: HAYATO/TAKA
  - Composition: TAKA
  - Arrangement: camino
  - Artist: camino
  - Episodes: 27-51

Ending themes

- "Kokoro Hakobu (TV Version)" (ココロハコブ（ＴＶバージョン）, Kokoro Hakobu (Terebi Bājon); "Beating Heart")
  - Lyrics & Composition: Hyōe Ebata (江畑 兵衛, Ebata Hyōe)
  - Arrangement: TRIPLANE & Masanori Sasaji (笹路 正徳, Sasaji Masanori)
  - Artist: TRIPLANE
  - Episodes: 1-26
  TRIPLANE had previously released a version of "Kokoro Hakobu" on their second album, Kokoro Haretara (ココロ晴れたら, Kokoro Haretara). The TV arrangement of the song was released on their next single, "Natsu ga Owareba/Kokoro Hakobu" (夏が終われば／ココロハコブ, Natsu ga Owareba/Kokoro Hakobu), on July 16, 2008.
- "Arigatō" (ありがとう; "Thank You")
  - Lyrics & Composition: Kunio Tago (多胡 邦夫, Tago Kunio)
  - Arrangement: Yasunari Nakamura (中村 康就, Nakamura Yasunari)
  - Artist: Yusaku Kiyama (木山 裕策, Kiyama Yūsaku)
  - Episodes: 27-44
  "Arigatō" is included on Yusaku Kiyama's mini-album WAIT FOR YOU: Ima no Boku ni Dekiru Koto (WAIT FOR YOU～今の僕に出来る事～, WAIT FOR YOU ~Ima no Boku ni Dekiru Koto~). It is his first album, following the release of his first single, "home."
- "Harebare" (ハレバレ; "Cheerful")
  - Lyrics: HAMMER & Mago & JIN
  - Composition & Arrangement: Jin
  - Artist: 2BACKKA
  - Episodes: 45-51

Movie theme

- "ONE WAY TO ROCK!!"
  - Lyrics: HAYATO
  - Composition: KIKU
  - Arrangement: camino
  - Artist: camino

== Syndication ==
While Tomica Hero: Rescue Force initially aired on TV Aichi, it is syndicated on TV Tokyo Network, Iwate Menkoi Television, Higashinippon Broadcasting, Fukushima Central Television, The Niigata Television Network 21, Nagano Broadcasting Systems, TV Shizuoka, Ehime Asahi Television, Nagasaki Broadcasting Company, Ryukyu Asahi Broadcasting, and Biwako Broadcasting.

New television show	Tomica Hero Series; 2008 - 2009	Succeeded by Rescue Fire
