= Rey (band) =

Japanese rock band

- Origin: Japan
- Genres: Rock; pop; anison
- Years active: 2008–2013
- Label: Lantis
- Members: Kenta Harada; Takayuki Sakamoto; Kenji Terazono; Matoshi Manabe; Shinya Tasaki
- Website: www.reyweb.jp

Rey is a Japanese band who signed onto the Lantis label in 2008. They are described as the "real anison band" (本気のアニソンバンド, honki no anison bando) for their performances of anime theme songs. Front man Kenta Harada claims that their band's name comes from both Hironobu Kageyama's band Lazy and the anime character Rei Ayanami. The group's debut single under Lantis was used as the first ending theme of Tomica Hero: Rescue Fire. Rey was also included on Lantis's compilation album Gundam Tribute from Lantis, covering "Stand Up to the Victory", the first opening theme for Mobile Suit V Gundam. The band broke up as on August 31, 2013.

== Members ==
=== Regular members ===
- Kenta Harada (原田 謙太, Harada Kenta; born July 18 in Ōita Prefecture): Vocals and lyricist
- Takayuki Sakamoto (坂本 尭之, Sakamoto Takayuki; born August 19 in Miyazaki Prefecture): Bass guitar
- Kenji Terazono (寺園 健二, Terazono Kenji; born August 5 in Kagoshima Prefecture): Guitar
- Shinya Tasaki (田崎 慎也, Tasaki Shin'ya; born February 17 in Fukuoka Prefecture): Guitar

=== Former members ===
- Matoshi Manabe (真辺 雅俊, Manabe Matoshi; born September 10 in Kagoshima Prefecture.): Drums. He withdrew from the band in October 2010.

== Discography ==
=== Indie albums ===
- Wind Gate - March 5, 2008
  1. "Message" (メッセージ, Messēji)
  2. "Seishun Giga" (青春GIGA; "Youth Giga")
  3. "Hero Kōhosei" (ヒーロー候補生, Hīrō Kōhosei; "Hero Cadet")
  4. "Sora" (空; "Sky")
  5. "Fuyu no Yowamushi" (冬のヨワムシ; "Winter Coward")

=== Albums ===
- Rey - November 26, 2008
  1. "Generation"
  2. "Isshinfuran" (一心不乱; "Wholeheartedly")
  3. "Nagai Tabiji no Tochū" (長い旅路の途中; "The Middle of a Long Journey")
  4. "Hi no Tori" (火の鳥; "Fire Bird)
  5. "Cha-La Head-Cha-La"
- H.A.B (Hit and Break) - April 6, 2011
  1. "Hit and Break!"
  2. "Road to Kingdom" (PS2 Game "Desert Kingdom" Opening theme)
  3. "RIDE OUT!" (Adeventure game "INSTANT BRAIN" Promotional song)
  4. "LEGEND of KAISER" (Movie/OVA Mazinkaizer SKL Insert song)
  5. "Mugen kairou -Moebius- (夢限界楼-メヴィウス-) (PS2 Game "Armen Noir" Opening theme)
  6. "Kuchidake Banchou" (口だけ番長)
  7. "AXEL TRANSFORMERS" (Anime television series "Transformers Animated" Ending theme)
  8. "Rescue Dream!" (TV Tokusatsu Dorama "Tomica Hero: Rescue Fire" Insert song)
  9. "Rasen" (螺旋) (PS2 Game "Armen Noir" Ending theme)
  10. "Alive a Soldiers"
  11. "Boukensha" (冒険者) (PS2 Game "Desert Kingdom" Ending theme)
  12. "BURNING HERO" (TV Tokusatsu Dorama "Tomica Hero: Rescue Fire" Ending theme)
  13. "THANK YOU"

=== Singles ===
- "Burning Hero" - June 3, 2009
  - C/W "Rescue Dream!"
  - Ending theme song for Tomica Hero: Rescue Fire
- "Axel Transformers" - May 12, 2010
  - C/W "Alive a Soldier"
  - Ending theme song for Transformers Animated
- "Road to Kingdom" - July 7, 2010
  - C/W "Bōkensha" (冒険者; "Adventurer")
  - Theme songs for Desert Kingdom
- "MONSUNO!"" - November 28, 2012
  - C/W "Starting over"
  - Opening theme song for Juusen Battle Monsuno

=== Non-single tracks ===
- "Stand Up to the Victory (To the Victory)" (STAND UP TO THE VICTORY～トゥ・ザ・ヴィクトリー～, STAND UP TO THE VICTORY ~Tu Za Vikutorī)
  - From Gundam Tribute from Lantis
- "Rescue King" (レスキューキング, Resukyū Kingu)
  - From Tomica Hero: Rescue Fire: Original Soundtrack
- "Haru no Mukou" (春の向こう)
  - From Hanasaku Iroha: Original Soundtrack
- "Kiss of the Alice Blue" (アリスブルーのキス, Arisu Burū no Kisu)
  - From Anime television series/Data Cardass Aikatsu! Original Soundtrack - Aikatsu! Music!! 01
