= Triplane (band) =

Japanese rock band

- Genres: Rock
- Years active: 2002–present
- Labels: Tearbridge Records(2004-2017); Ezogashima Label (2017-); Ivy Records (2018-)
- Members: Hyoue Ebata; Kazuya Takeda; Makoto Hirota
- Past members: Kenji Kawamura
- Website: Triplane.jp

Triplane is a Japanese rock band who has released multiple singles and albums, as well as performed songs for the soundtracks of anime, dramas, and other Japanese programming. "Moving Heart" (ココロハコブ, Kokoro Hakobu) off of their most recent album and single has been used as the ending theme for Tomica Hero: Rescue Force. In 2006, their single "Dear Friends" was used as the ending theme for One Piece episodes 246 through 255.

== Members ==
- Hyoue Ebata (江畑 兵衛, Ebata Hyōe; May 11, 1979 -) — Vocals & guitar (2002-)
- Kazuya Takeda (武田 和也, Takeda Kazuya; September 21, 1979 -) — Bass (2002-)
- Makoto Hirota (広田 周, Hirota Makoto; April 11, 1979 -) — Drums (2002-)

Former members

- Kenji Kawamura (川村 健司, Kawamura Kenji; August 19, 1976 -) — Guitar (2004-2019)

== Discography ==
=== Albums ===
- Home - October 18, 2006
1. ライナーノート
2. 陽だまりのように
3. スピードスター
4. Dear Friends
5. あの雲を探して
6. Days
7. 夏の夢
8. Raspberry
9. Reset
10. いつものように
11. 僕らの街
- Sunny Heart (ココロ晴れたら, Kokoro Haretara) - February 6, 2008
1. モノローグ
2. 愛の唄
3. I Am
4. 扉を開くよ
5. メトロ
6. Jump ー線の向こうへー
7. 僕に出来る事
8. Yesterday
9. エアポケット
10. ココロハコブ
11. 明日晴れたら
- Kimi ni Saku Uta (君に咲くうた) - February 4, 2009
1. Dare ni Saku Hana (誰に咲く花)
2. Always
3. Taiyou no Kisetsu ni (太陽の季節に)
4. Remon (檸檬)
5. Natsu ga Owareba (夏が終われば)
6. Omohide no Sora (おもひでの空)
7. Around My Life
8. Akibare no Sora no Shite de (秋晴れの空の下で)
9. Shiroi Hana (白い花)
10. Koe (声)
11. Kimi ni Saku Uta (君に咲く歌)

=== Singles ===
- "Speedstar" (スピードスター, Supīdosutā) - October 13, 2004
1. スピードスター
2. 風
3. セーター
- "Looking for That Cloud/Paradise" (あの雲を探して/パラダイス, Ano Kumo o Sagashite/Paradaisu) - May 26, 2005
1. あの雲を探して
2. パラダイス
- "Reset/ゲンジボタル" - August 3, 2005
1. Reset
2. ゲンジボタル
- "Dear Friends" - January 11, 2006
1. Dear Friends
2. You
3. Dear Friends (TVエンディング用70秒バージョン)［初回限定盤のみ］
- "As Usual" (いつものように, Itsumo no Yō ni) - May 17, 2006
1. いつものように
2. monopoly
- "Energy" (エナジー, Enajī) - August 1, 2007
1. エナジー
- "Monologue" (モノローグ, Monorōgu) - November 7, 2007
  - Disc 1
  1. モノローグ
  2. エナジー
  3. Dear Friends～アコースティックver.～
- Disc 2
  1. モノローグ
  2. Singleメドレー
  3. Dear Friends～アコースティックver.～
- "After the Summer/Moving Heart" (夏が終われば/ココロハコブ, Natsu ga Owareba/Kokoro Hakobu) - July 16, 2008
1. 夏が終われば
2. ココロハコブ～TV Ver.～
3. モノローグ～アコーステックver.～
- "White Flower" (白い花, Shiroi Hana) - December 3, 2008
  - CD only
  1. 白い花
  2. addiction
  3. 白い花～オーケストラVer.～
  - CD & DVD
  1. 白い花
  2. 白い花～オーケストラVer.～
  3. 夏が終われば～アコースティックLive Ver.～
  4. モノローグ～アコースティックLive Ver.～
  5. Dear Friends～アコースティックLive Ver.～
  6. 僕らの街～アコースティックLive Ver.～
  7. ココロハコブ～アコースティックLive Ver.～
