= Tomica Hero Series =

Japanese television series

The Tomica Hero Series (トミカヒーローシリーズ, Tomika Hīrō Shirīzu) was a short-lived tokusatsu superhero franchise of Japanese superhero children's television dramas. Based on Takara Tomy's Tomica toy car line, the series air on TV Aichi and TV Tokyo before being syndicated around Japan. Takara Tomy previously produced Madan Senki Ryukendo, but Ryukendo was not based on a pre-existing set of toys for the company. However, it made reference to the Earth Federation which the UFDA is a branch of, its main cast making a cameo in the Rescue Force movie. Although airing on different days, the Tomica Hero Series served as competition to TV Asahi and Toei Company's Super Sentai and Kamen Rider Series and Tsuburaya Productions' Ultra Series. Only two series were made with the Tomica Hero story, which concluded with a stage show featuring members of the Rescue Force cast.

== List of series ==
- Tomica Hero: Rescue Force (トミカヒーロー レスキューフォース, Tomika Hīrō Resukyū Fōsu): Airing from April 2008 to April 2009, the series featured a team of emergency service workers saving Japan from an organization trying to cause mayhem with artificial crises, as well as saving citizens from natural disasters. Rescue Force also had a film subtitled Rescue the Mach Train! (マッハトレインをレスキューせよ！, Mahha Torein o Resukyū seyo!), which the main cast of Ryukendo made a cameo in. The show's theme deals with "Rescue Soul", a term used in the series to describe what a rescuer stands for.
- Tomica Hero: Rescue Fire (トミカヒーロー レスキューファイアー, Tomika Hīrō Resukyū Faiā): Airing from April 4, 2009 to March 27, 2010 and a continuation of the first, Rescue Fire focuses on another group of emergency service workers who are solely firefighters, with its theme dealing with the value of life. The series also continues the plot device of the villains acting for the planet's sake. The series' opening theme songs are performed by anison supergroup JAM Project.
