= Akira Iwamoto =

Japanese baseball player (born 1992)

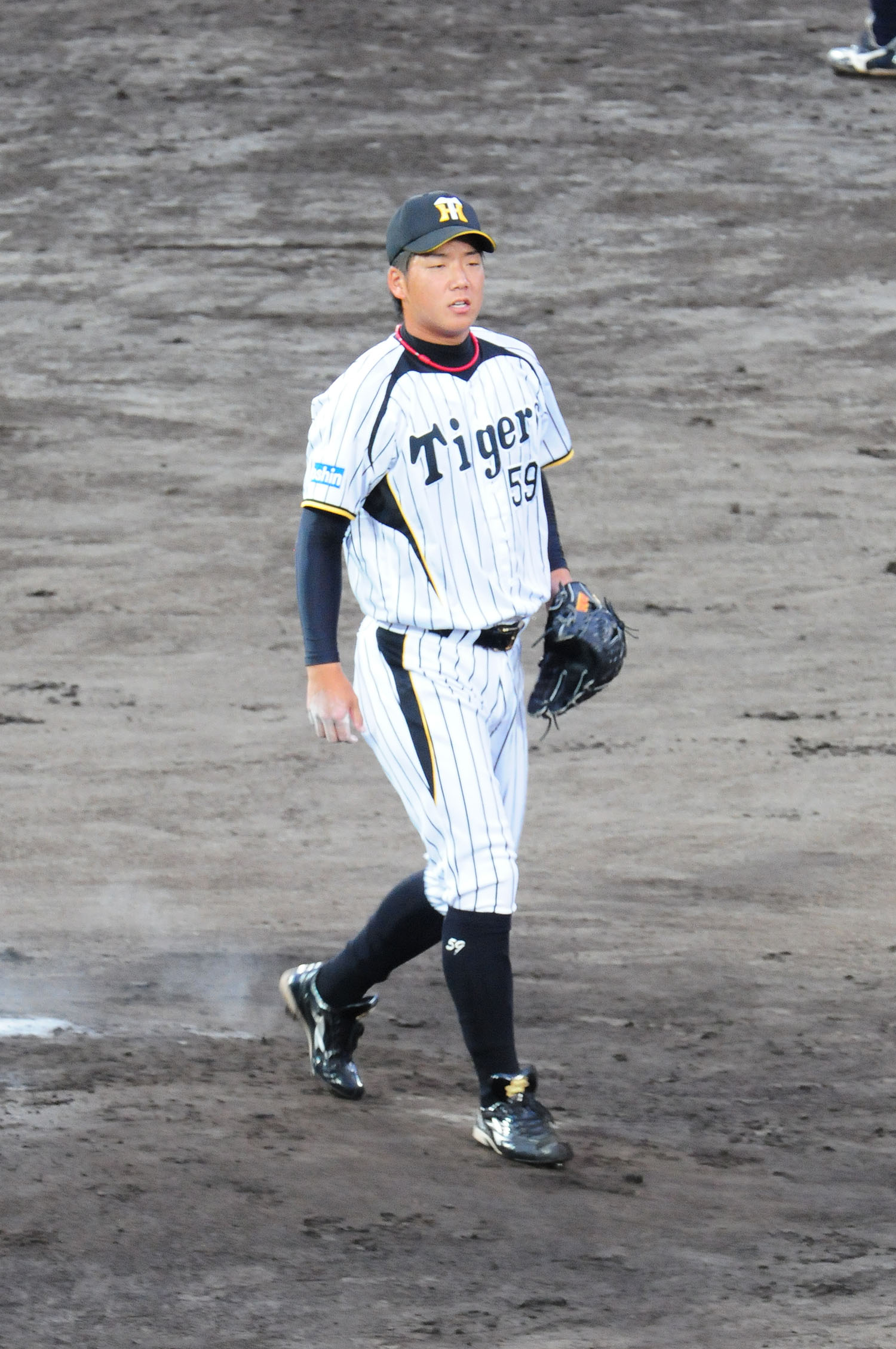
- Iwamoto with the Hanshin Tigers
- Pitcher
- Born: October 21, 1992 (age 34); Hofu City, Yamaguchi, Japan
- Batted: Left Threw: Right

NPB debut
- September 9, 2012, for the Hanshin Tigers

Last NPB appearance
- 2019, for the Orix Buffaloes

NPB statistics
- Win–loss record: 5–6
- Earned run average: 4.05
- Strikeouts: 46

Teams
- Hanshin Tigers (2011–2016); Fukui Miracle Elephants (2017–2018); Orix Buffaloes (2018–2019)

Akira Iwamoto (岩本 輝, Iwamoto Akira; born October 21, 1992) is a Japanese former professional baseball pitcher. He played in Nippon Professional Baseball (NPB) for the Hanshin Tigers and Orix Buffaloes.

== Amateur career ==
Akira began pitching in third grade, then went on to become the ace of Kuwanoyama Junior High where he led his school in winning the prefectural championship.

In his sophomore high school year, he pitched 2 consecutive complete games, and brought his team to the quarterfinals of Spring Koshien. The next year, his school made it to Summer Koshien, but got eliminated in the 1st round (2–1), despite him finishing the game with 99 pitches without relief nor walks issued.

In October 2010, he submitted his application for the 2010 Nippon Professional Baseball draft, with the condition that he will only turn pro should he receive 4th nomination or higher. Otherwise, he would join the industrial leagues.

== Professional career ==
=== Hanshin Tigers ===
The Hanshin Tigers selected Iwamoto as their 4th pick on October 28, 2010, and he signed a contract for an annual salary of 6 million yen, plus a 40 million yen signing bonus.

==== 2011 ====
Iwamoto spent his first year playing in Western League games (minors), where he pitched in six games, recorded one save, and an ERA of 2.84.

==== 2012 ====
Iwamoto continued pitching in ni-gun games, and recorded his first shutout game against the Orix Buffaloes in August. His success in ni-gun paid off, and he finally made it to the active roster on September 8. The following day, he debuted as a starter against the Chunichi Dragons in the Nagoya Dome, where he pitched six shutout innings (and allowed two hits) and recorded his first pro victory. With this, Iwamoto became the 13th Hanshin pitcher to record a win on his first outing, and just the 4th pitcher out of high school to do so, the last one being Osamu Nishimura in 1951. He was temporarily demoted to ni-gun to make way for additional players in the active roster, but on his 2nd outing against the Tokyo Yakult Swallows, he again recorded another win, making him the 3rd pitcher in franchise history to do so since Yukio Nishimura in 1937. On October 5, he would have been the first ever Hanshin pitcher to win all of his first three career starts, but due to a fielding error by Ryota Arai that resulted to a run and the lack of run support from the lineup, he earned his first career loss despite surrendering only three hits and no runs in six innings of work.

Iwamoto finished the season with a 2–1 record and a 0.00 ERA.

==== 2013 ====
Iwamoto again spent the first half of the season playing in ni-gun. His first appearance came on August 1 against the Chunichi Dragons, where he pitted against 48-year-old veteran Masahiro Yamamoto in what was called the battle of pitchers with the widest age gap in NPB history (27 years, 2 months). But despite the advantage of youth, Iwamoto suffered the loss when he gave up two runs in four innings, and was consequently taken off the roster the following day.

Iwamoto remained in the second squad for the rest of the season, and out of 18 starts, he finished with a dismal 3–7 win-loss record, and overall ERA of 3.95.

==== 2014 ====
Iwamoto joined the ichi-gun spring training camp in Okinawa. Pitching Coach Nakanishi saw his potential as a long reliever and was appointed as such during the pre-season exhibition games. He appeared on April 1 as a closer against the Dragons, and gave up one run in an inning of work. Iwamoto appeared in three additional games until May 29 as a closer, but never saw any more playing time in ichi-gun afterwards.

=== Orix Buffaloes ===
On July 7, 2018, Iwamoto signed a contract with the Orix Buffaloes.

== Playing style ==
Listed at 182 centimeters, Iwamoto is a right-handed pitcher who throws mostly fastballs, the occasional slider, and forkballs as changeup. He tries to emulate Tsunemi Tsuda, a former Hiroshima Toyo Carp pitcher and reliever who went to the same high school as he did. Iwamoto has been called "Tsuda the 2nd" because his 150 km/h fastball is reminiscent of the late pitcher.
