= 1983 Cannes Film Festival =

- Official poster of the 36th Cannes Film Festival, adapted from an original drawing by Akira Kurosawa.
- Opening film: The King of Comedy
- Closing film: WarGames
- Location: Cannes, France
- Founded: 1946
- Awards: Palme d'Or: The Ballad of Narayama
- No. of films: 22 (In Competition)
- Festival date: 7 May 1983 – 19 May 1983
- Website: festival-cannes.com/en

Cannes Film Festival
- 1984 1982

The 36th Cannes Film Festival took place from 7 to 19 May 1983. American author William Styron served as jury president for the main competition.

Japanese filmmaker Shōhei Imamura won the Palme d'Or, the festival's top prize, for the drama film The Ballad of Narayama.

In 1983, the festival's new main building, the Palais des Festivals et des Congrès, was inaugurated. Initially many described it as "a hideous concrete blockhouse", nicknaming it The Bunker.

The festival opened with The King of Comedy by Martin Scorsese, and closed with WarGames by John Badham.

== Juries ==
=== Main competition ===
- William Styron, American author - Jury President
- Henri Alekan, French cinematographer
- Yvonne Baby, French journalist and author
- Sergei Bondarchuk, Soviet filmmaker and actor
- Youssef Chahine, Egyptian filmmaker
- Souleymane Cissé, Malian filmmaker
- Gilbert de Goldschmidt, French producer
- Mariangela Melato, Italian actress
- Karel Reisz, British filmmaker
- Lia van Leer, Israeli founder of the Haifa Cinematheque, the Jerusalem Cinematheque, the Israel Film Archive and the Jerusalem Film Festival

=== Camera d'Or ===
- Bernard Jubard, French - Jury President
- Philippe Carcassonne, French producer
- Dan Fainaru, Israeli
- Monique Grégoire, French
- Alexis Grivas, Mexican
- Adrienne Hancia, American
- Jean-Daniel Simon, French filmmaker

== Official selection ==
=== In Competition ===
The following feature films competed for the Palme d'Or:

English title	Original title	Director(s)	Production country
L'Argent		Robert Bresson	France, Switzerland
The Ballad of Narayama	楢山節考	Shōhei Imamura	Japan
Carmen		Carlos Saura	Spain
Cross Creek		Martin Ritt	United States
The Death of Mario Ricci	La mort de Mario Ricci	Claude Goretta	France, Switzerland
Duvar		Yılmaz Güney	Turkey, France
Eréndira		Ruy Guerra	Mexico, France, West Germany
Forbidden Relations	Visszaesők	Zsolt Kézdi-Kovács	Hungary
Heat and Dust		James Ivory	United Kingdom
The King of Comedy (opening film)		Martin Scorsese	United States
Kharij		Mrinal Sen	India
Merry Christmas, Mr. Lawrence	戦場のメリークリスマス	Nagisa Ōshima	Japan, United Kingdom, New Zealand
Monty Python's The Meaning of Life		Terry Jones	United Kingdom
Moon in the Gutter	La Lune dans le caniveau	Jean-Jacques Beineix	France
Nostalghia		Andrei Tarkovsky	Soviet Union, Italy
One Deadly Summer	L'Été meurtrier	Jean Becker	France
Station for Two	Вокзал для двоих	Eldar Ryazanov	Soviet Union
The Story of Piera	Storia di Piera	Marco Ferreri	Italy
El Sur		Víctor Erice	Spain
Tender Mercies		Bruce Beresford	United States
The Wounded Man	L'Homme blessé	Patrice Chéreau	France
The Year of Living Dangerously		Peter Weir	Australia, United States

=== Un Certain Regard ===
The following films were selected for the Un Certain Regard section:

English title	Original title	Director(s)	Production country
Bella Donna		Peter Keglevic	West Germany
Caballo salvaje		Joaquín Cortés	Venezuela
Can She Bake a Cherry Pie?		Henry Jaglom	United States
The Eighties	Les Années 80	Chantal Akerman	Belgium, France
The Haircut		Tamar Simon Hoffs	United States
The Herdsman	牧马人	Xie Jin	China
Humanonon		Michel François	France
La matiouette ou l'arrière-pays		André Téchiné	France
Nešto između		Srđan Karanović	Yugoslavia
News Items	Faits divers	Raymond Depardon	France
The Pool Hustlers	Io, Chiara e lo scuro	Maurizio Ponzi	Italy
Poverty Certificate	Le certificat d'indigence	Moussa Bathily	Senegal
The Shimmering Beast	La bête lumineuse	Pierre Perrault	Canada
Twenty Years of African Cinema	Caméra d'Afrique	Férid Boughedir	Tunisia
Ulysse		Agnès Varda	France
Zappa		Bille August	Denmark

=== Out of Competition ===
The following films were selected to be screened out of competition:

English title	Original title	Director(s)	Production country
Angelo My Love		Robert Duvall	United States
Boat People	投奔怒海	Ann Hui	Hong Kong, China
Équateur		Serge Gainsbourg	France, West Germany, Gabon
Holtpont		Ferenc Rofusz	Hungary
The Hunger		Tony Scott	United Kingdom, United States
The Man in the Silk Hat	L'homme au chapeau de soie	Maud Linder	France
Modori River	もどり川	Tatsumi Kumashiro	Japan
Streamers		Robert Altman	United States
Utu		Geoff Murphy	New Zealand
Walking, Walking	Cammina, cammina	Ermanno Olmi	Italy
WarGames (closing film)		John Badham	United States
The Wicked Lady		Michael Winner	United Kingdom, United States

=== Short Films Competition ===
The following short films competed for the Short Film Palme d'Or:

- Ad astra by Ferenc Cakó
- Un Arrivo by Dominique De Fazio
- The Butterfly by Dieter Müller
- Don Kichot by Krzysztof Raynoch
- L'Égout by Maria Eugenia Santos
- La Fonte de Barlaeus by Pierre-Henry Salfati
- Haast een hand by Gerrit van Dijk, Jacques Overtoom, Peter Sweenen
- Je sais que j'ai tort mais demandez à mes copains ils disent la même chose by Pierre Levy
- The Only Forgotten Take of Casablanca by Charly Weller
- Too Much Oregano by Kerry Feltham

== Parallel sections ==
=== International Critics' Week ===
The following feature films were screened for the 22nd International Critics' Week (22e Semaine de la Critique):

- Betrayal (Løperjenten) by Vibeke Lokkeberg (Norway)
- Carnival in the Night (Yami no kānibaru) by Masashi Yamamoto (Japan)
- Le Destin de Juliette by Aline Issermann (France)
- Faux fuyants by Alain Bergala, Jean-Pierre Limosin (France)
- Lianna by John Sayles (United States)
- Menuet by Lili Rademakers (Belgium, Netherlands)
- The Princess (Adj király katonát) by Pal Erdöss (Hungary)

=== Directors' Fortnight ===
The following films were screened for the 1983 Directors' Fortnight (Quinzaine des Réalizateurs):

- Anguelos by Georges Katakouzinos
- Another Time, Another Place by Michael Radford
- Barbarosa by Fred Schepisi
- The Stationmaster's Wife (Bolwieser) by Rainer Werner Fassbinder
- The Compass Rose (La rosa de los vientos) by Patricio Guzman
- Daniel Takes a Train (Szerencsés Dániel) by Pal Sandor
- Dead End Street by Yaky Yosha
- Demons in the Garden (Demonios en el jardín) by Manuel Gutierrez Aragon
- Strange Fruits (Eisenhans) by Tankred Dorst
- Grenzenlos by Josef Rödl
- The House of the Yellow Carpet (La casa del tappeto giallo) by Carlo Lizzani
- Just a Game (Rien qu'un jeu) by Brigitte Sauriol
- Last Days of the Victim (Últimos días de la víctima) by Adolfo Aristarain
- Local Hero by Bill Forsyth
- Miss Lonelyhearts by Michael Dinner (Brief mention in novel)
- No Trace of Sin (Sem Sombra De Pecado) by José Fonseca e Costa
- La rue étroite (Xiao Jie) by Yang Yanjin
- Rupture (al-Inquita - Breakdown) by Mohamed Chouikh
- A Woman in Flames (Die flambierte Frau) by Robert van Ackeren

Short films

- Alchimie by Michèle Miron, Richard Clark
- Conte Obscur by Manuel Gómez
- Dédicace by Marie Brazeau
- The Life And Death of Joe Soap by Lewis John Cooper
- Phalloctere by Manuel Gómez
- Saudade by Carlos Porto de Andrade Jr, Leonardo Crescenti Neto

== Official Awards ==
=== In Competition ===
- Palme d'Or: The Ballad of Narayama by Shōhei Imamura
- Grand Prix: Monty Python's The Meaning of Life by Terry Jones
- Best Director: The prize was shared under the bespoke title Grand Prix du cinéma de création.
  - Robert Bresson for L'Argent
  - Andrei Tarkovsky for Nostalghia
- Best Actress: Hanna Schygulla for The Story of Piera
- Best Actor: Gian Maria Volonté for The Death of Mario Ricci
- Best Artistic Contribution: Carmen by Carlos Saura
- Jury Prize: Kharij by Mrinal Sen

=== Caméra d'Or ===
- The Princess by Pál Erdöss

=== Short Film Palme d'Or ===
- Je sais que j'ai tort mais demandez à mes copains ils disent la même chose by Pierre Levy
- Jury Prize:
  - The Only Forgotten Take of Casablanca by Charly Weller
  - Too Much Oregano by Kerry Feltham

== Independent Awards ==
=== FIPRESCI Prizes ===
- Nostalghia by Andrei Tarkovsky (In competition)
- Daniel Takes a Train by Pál Sándor (Directors' Fortnight)

=== Commission Supérieure Technique ===
- Technical Grand Prize: Carmen by Carlos Saura

=== Prize of the Ecumenical Jury ===
- Nostalghia by Andrei Tarkovsky

=== Award of the Youth ===
- Foreign Film: Miss Lonelyhearts by Michael Dinner

== Media ==
- INA: Opening of the 1983 Festival (commentary in French)
- INA: Directors' Fortnight, 1983 (commentary in French)
- INA: Closing evening of the 1983 festival (commentary in French)
