= Au Secours! =

1924 film by Abel Gance

- Directed by: Abel Gance
- Written by: Max Linder; Abel Gance
- Produced by: Abel Gance
- Starring: Max Linder
- Cinematography: Émile Pierre; André-Wladimir Reybas; Georges Specht
- Release date: 17 June 1924
- Running time: 23 minutes
- Country: France
- Language: Silent

Au Secours! is a 1924 short French silent comedy horror film, directed by Abel Gance and starring Max Linder. The French title translates into English as "Help!". The film is also known as The Haunted House in some reference books. The film was made on a dare, with Gance filming the entire project in three days, with the help of his friend, actor Max Linder. Linder had just returned to France after several years of trying to start an acting career in Canada.

Max Linder, depressed since his service in World War I, had earlier entered into a suicide pact with his younger wife in 1924, the year after they were married, but the attempt failed and the event was hushed up. Their second attempt succeeded however in 1925, and the pair succumbed to an overdose of poison and blood loss from slitting their wrists, leaving behind a very young daughter Maud. Quentin Tarantino included a reference/ homage to Linder in his 2009 film, Inglourious Basterds.

The film is based on the haunted house premise, though the setting is a haunted castle. In the film, a young man agrees to spend one hour in the haunted castle to win a bet with a count. He faces living mannequins, skeletons, wild animals, and ghosts. Yet, he loses the bet when he is tricked into believing that his wife is in distress and runs to her side.

== Plot ==
The boastful Count Maulette dares some guests in a private club to spend one hour in a haunted house which he knows of. A young newlywed named Max takes on the challenge, and they bet a thousand francs on it. Max must stay in the castle from 11 PM until midnight in order to win the bet. The Count arranges for Max to have a bell which he can ring for help. The problem is that if he rings the bell, he loses the bet.

After Max is locked inside, he is assaulted by a wild barrage of seemingly weird supernatural events (a mannequin comes to life and assaults him, men in skeleton costumes prance about, wild animals wander the corridors and ghosts seem to fly about). Finally, just as he is about to win the bet, the phone rings and Max is told that his wife back home is being threatened by an intruder. Panic-stricken, Max rings the bell minutes before midnight to run to his wife's defense, and therein loses the bet. The audience later discovers it was the Count calling him on the phone, pretending Max's wife was in danger.

== Cast ==
- Max Linder - Max
- Jean Toulout - Count Maulette
- Gina Palerme - Edith
- Gaston Modot

== Criticism ==
Critic Christopher Workman writes the film's "horrific incidents.....none of it particularly funny or scary, employ props, techniques and effects that were already old hat in 1924 --- fast motion, slow motion, wire work, superimpositions, stunt doubles on trampolines, men in ghost and skeleton costumes, a man on stilts, etc....".
