= Gina Palerme =

French actress and dancer

- Gina Palerme and Roy Royston in Bric-a-Brac, 1915
- Born: Marie Louise Irène de Maulmont; 18 December 1885; Bussière-Galant, French Third Republic
- Died: 26 December 1977 (aged 92); Les Pavillons-sous-Bois, France
- Occupation: Actress
- Years active: 1909–1929
- Spouse: Pierre Palette (m. 1932)

Gina Palerme (born Marie Louise Irène de Maulmont, 18 December 1885 – 26 December 1977) was a French actress and dancer.

== Biography ==
Gina Palerme was born Marie Louise Irène de Maulmont (also spelled Maumont) on 18 December 1885, the daughter of Baron Marie Antoine Aymard Hubert de Maulmont (1850–1891) and Antoinette Gazenaud (born 1853). She had an older brother, Marie Jean Baptiste Marcel (1882–1914), who died in World War I, and a younger sister, Rose (born 1889). The family were descended from the ancient Limousin nobility and were related to the House of Borgia.

Palerme's father died in 1891, and she and her two siblings were raised by their widowed mother.

Palerme began her stage career in France in 1909 before being discovered by an English impresario in 1910. Palerme left for London, and debuted as Toinette in The Quaker Girl at the Adelphi Theatre, followed by appearances in West-end productions such as The Dancing Mistress (1912), Betty (1914), Platons Les Capucines (1914), Bric-a-Brac (1915), Vanity Fair (1916), La Petite Chocolatière (1917), Finsbury (1917), and The Girl for the Boy (1919).

Cecil Beaton enthusiastically wrote, "Gina Palerme brought the glamour of the French cocotte to London. Her off-stage appearances were as sensational as her stage escapades...sometimes she wore a velvet tam-o'-shanter and men's riding breeches while relaxing in the richly ornate gilt of her Maida Vale drawing-room."

Palerme returned to France in 1919, and acted in various silent films, such as L’éternel féminin (1921), Margot (1922), L’idée de Françoise (1923), in which she played the title role, and Frou-Frou (1923).

She appeared in The Battle (1923) with Sessue Hayakawa and his wife Tsuru Aoki. She also appeared with Hayakawa and Aoki in the American version of The Battle, The Danger Line (1924).

In 1924, she co-starred with Max Linder in Au Secours!. Her final screen appearance was in La Clé de voûte (1925), directed by Roger Lion and produced by Palerme herself.

After leaving the film industry, Palerme worked in French cabarets such as the Moulin Rouge and the Concert Mayol.

Palerme retired in 1929. On 6 February 1932, she married Pierre Palette, a commercial employee. Palerme died on 26 December 1977.

== Selected filmography ==
- Margot (1922)
- L'idée de Francoise (1923)
- The Battle (1923)
- Frou-Frou (1924)
- The Danger Line (1924)
- Help! (1924) – short
- La Clé de voûte (1925)
