= Horrible Histories (disambiguation) =

Horrible Histories is an educational entertainment franchise.

Horrible Histories may also refer to:

- Horrible Histories (book series), a series of illustrated history books published in the United Kingdom
- Horrible Histories (2000 TV series), an American animated children's television series
- Horrible Histories (2009 TV series), a British children's sketch comedy television series produced in five series from 2009 to 2014
- Horrible Histories (2015 TV series), a rebooted British television series of the above
- Horrible Histories: The Movie – Rotten Romans, a 2019 British historical comedy film
