= Meshach Taylor =

American actor (1947–2014)

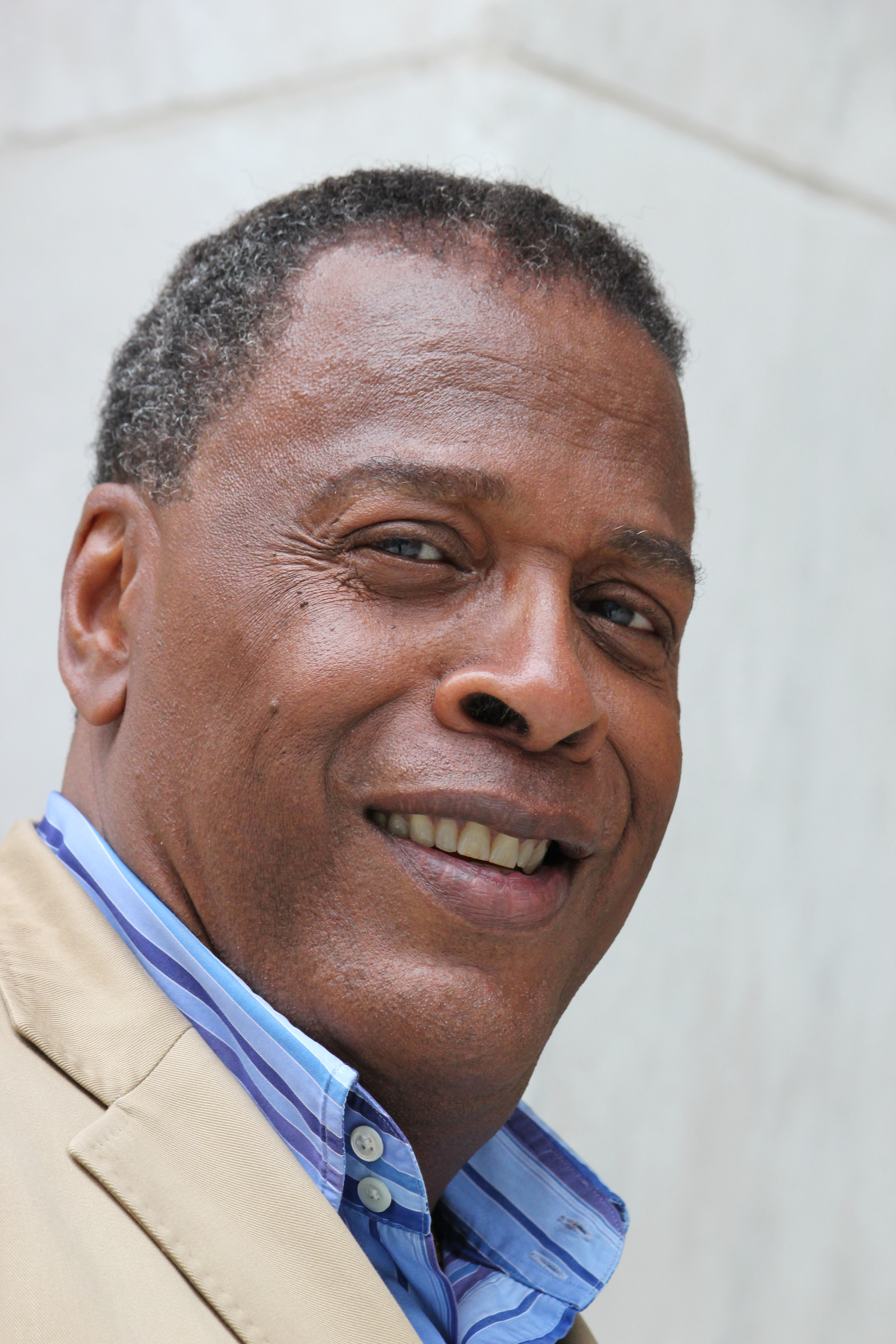
- Taylor in 2011
- Born: April 11, 1947; Boston, Massachusetts, U.S.
- Died: June 28, 2014 (aged 67); Altadena, California, U.S.
- Occupation: Actor
- Years active: 1978–2014
- Spouse: Sandra Taylor (m. 1969; div. 1980) Bianca Ferguson (m. 1983)
- Children: 4
- Father: Joseph T. Taylor

Bruce Meshach Thomas Taylor (/ˈmiːʃæk/; April 11, 1947 – June 28, 2014) was an American actor, widely known for his role as Anthony Bouvier on the CBS sitcom Designing Women (1986–93), for which he was nominated for the Primetime Emmy Award for Outstanding Supporting Actor in a Comedy Series. He was also known for his portrayal of Hollywood Montrose, a flamboyant window dresser in the 1987 film Mannequin and its 1991 sequel. He played Sheldon Baylor on the CBS sitcom Dave's World (1993–97), appeared as Tony on the NBC sitcom Buffalo Bill opposite Dabney Coleman, and appeared as the recurring character Alastair Wright, the social studies teacher (and later school principal) on the Nickelodeon sitcom Ned's Declassified School Survival Guide.

== Early life ==
Taylor was born in Boston, Massachusetts, the son of Hertha Mae (née Ward) and Joseph T. Taylor, former dean of students at Dillard University in New Orleans, who was also the first dean of arts and sciences at Indiana University – Purdue University Indianapolis.

After the family moved from New Orleans to Indianapolis, Taylor graduated from Crispus Attucks High School in 1964, where he took an interest in acting, and went on to study in the dramatic arts programs at Wilmington College (Ohio) and Florida A&M University. Leaving Florida A&M a few credits shy of graduation, he worked in Indianapolis as a State House reporter for AM radio station WIFE (now WTLC), where he used the on-air name Bruce Thomas, and as the host of a community-affairs program on television station WLWI (now WTHR), as Bruce Taylor. In May 1993, he received his bachelor's degree in theatre arts from Florida A&M.

== Career ==
=== Theater and teleplays ===
Taylor's first professional acting gig was in a national tour of Hair. He honed his craft in repertory theater as a member of Chicago's Goodman Theatre, and the Organic Theater Company alongside Joe Mantegna, André DeShields, Dennis Franz, Keith Szarabajka, Jack Wallace, and director Stuart Gordon. While in Chicago, he appeared in David Rabe's Streamers, Native Son (1979 Joseph Jefferson Award Nomination for Actor in a Principal Role in a Play), The Island and Athol Fugard’s Sizwe Banzi Is Dead, for which he garnered the 1977 Joseph Jefferson Award for Actor in a Principal Role in a Play. He received an Emmy Award for his role as Jim in the WTTW production of Huckleberry Finn and hosted the Chicago television show Black Life. In 1998, Taylor made his Broadway debut as Lumiere in Beauty and the Beast, where he starred alongside Toni Braxton. In September 2012, he appeared in Year of the Rabbit at Ensemble Studio Theater-LA as Vietnam veteran JC Bridges.

=== Television and film ===
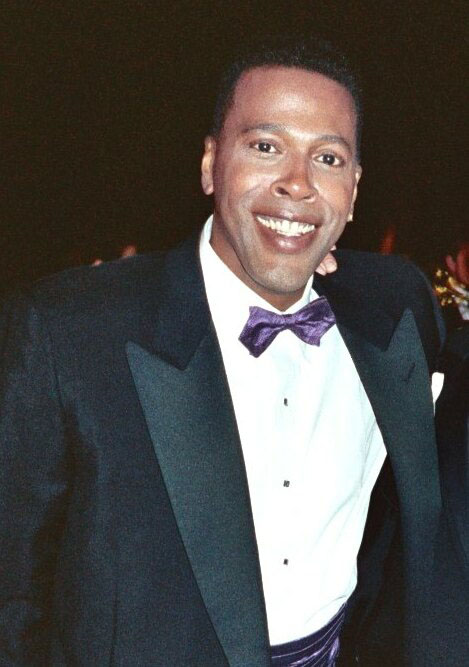
Taylor at the 1989 Emmy Awards

In 1977, Taylor moved to Los Angeles, where he crafted a gallery of memorable characters in film and on television, including his Emmy-nominated turn in the CBS sitcom Designing Women. Taylor played Anthony Bouvier, the deliveryman at the Sugarbaker interior design firm in Atlanta, Georgia. In 1989, he received an Emmy nomination for Outstanding Supporting Actor in a Comedy Series. In May 1981, in the ninth season finale of M*A*S*H, he was seen as a corpsman. Episode, "The Life You Save".

After Designing Women ended, he was a series regular as plastic surgeon Sheldon Baylor on Dave's World (CBS) from 1993 to 1997, and had a recurring role as Alastair Wright, the history teacher turned school principal, on Nickelodeon's sitcom, Ned's Declassified School Survival Guide (2004–07) and Buffalo Bill on NBC with Dabney Coleman.

Other appearances include: The Unit, Jessie, Hannah Montana as a fashion designer, All of Us as Neesee's father, The Drew Carey Show, Static Shock, Caroline in the City, Aaahh!!! Real Monsters, Women of the House, In the Heat of the Night, Punky Brewster, What's Happening Now!!, Hill Street Blues, ALF, Melba, The Golden Girls, Cagney & Lacey, Barney Miller, Lou Grant, The White Shadow, The Incredible Hulk, The Secret of NIMH 2: Timmy to the Rescue, and Barnaby Jones.

In 1996, Taylor hosted his own series on HGTV, The Urban Gardener with Meshach Taylor, and in 1998, he hosted Meshach Taylor's Hidden Caribbean on The Travel Channel. He was a regular panelist on the 2000 revival of the television game show To Tell the Truth. He co-hosted Living Live! with Florence Henderson on Retirement Living TV in 2008 until the program was revamped as The Florence Henderson Show.

Taylor had been friends with actor Joe Mantegna since they appeared together in 1969 in the musical Hair. Taylor guest-starred in 2012 on Criminal Minds' eighth season in the episode "The Fallen", opposite Mantegna as Harrison Scott, Rossi's former Marine sergeant with whom he served in Vietnam. In January 2014, he reprised this role in "The Road Home" which aired January 22, 2014, just five months before his death. Mantegna led a Criminal Minds tenth season episode "Anonymous", to honor Taylor on January 21, 2015.

Taylor appeared in such feature films as Mannequin, Mannequin Two: On the Move, and Damien: Omen II.

== Personal life and death ==
Taylor married actress Bianca Ferguson in 1983. He had four children, three with Bianca and one from a previous marriage. His children are daughters Tamar, Esme and Yasmine and son Tariq; he had four grandchildren.

Taylor died of colorectal cancer on June 28, 2014, at his home in Altadena, California. A memorial service was held at Forest Lawn Memorial Park (Hollywood Hills) on July 6, 2014.

== Filmography ==
Film and television roles
Year	Title	Role	Notes	Ref.
1978	Damien - Omen II	Dr. J. Kayne		
1978	Stony Island	Aldeman's Yes-Man		
1981	The Howling	Shantz		
1982	The Beast Within	Deputy Herbert		
1982	The Haircut	Sam		
1985	Explorers	Gordon Miller		
1985	Warning Sign	Video Technician #2		
1985	What's Happening Now!!	Buddy Carlton	Recurring role (season 1–2); 2 episodes	
1985	The Golden Girls	Police Officer		
1986	One More Saturday Night	Bill Neal		
1986	Inside Out	Freddy		
1986–1993	Designing Women	Anthony Bouvier	Recurring role (season 1–2), main role (season 3–7); 152 episodes Nominated – Primetime Emmy Award for Outstanding Supporting Actor in a Comedy Series (1989)	
1987	Mannequin	Hollywood Montrose		
1987	The Allnighter	Hotel Detective Philip		
1987	House of Games	Mr. Dean		
1988	Kid Safe: The Video	Marty	Short film	
1990	Ultra Warrior	Elijah		
1991	Mannequin Two: On the Move	Hollywood Montrose / Doorman		
1992	Class Act	Duncan's Dad		
1992	In the Heat of the Night	Tyler Corbin		
1993	Double, Double, Toil and Trouble	Mr. N		
1993–1997	Dave's World	Shel Baylor	Main role (97 episodes)	
1997	The Right Connections	Lionel Clark		
1998	The Secret of NIMH 2: Timmy to the Rescue	Cecil	Voice, direct-to-video	
2000	Jacks or Better	Ron		
2000	Static Shock	Doctor Harris	Voice, episode: "Aftershock"	
2001	Friends & Family	Bruno		
2004–2007	Ned's Declassified School Survival Guide	Mr. Wright	Recurring role (23 episodes)	
2010	Wigger	Charles Pruitt		
2010	Tranced	Cabbie		
2011	Hyenas	Crazy Briggs		
2012	Jessie	Grimm Haloran	Episode: "The Whining"	
2012–2014	Criminal Minds	Harrison Scott	2 episodes; final role	
