= The Danger Line =

1924 film

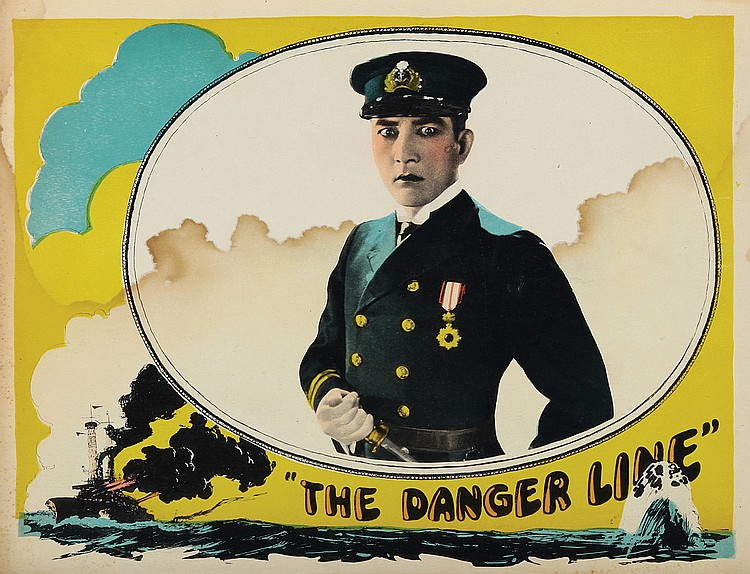
- Directed by: Édouard-Émile Violet
- Written by: Margaret Turnbull
- Starring: Sessue Hayakawa
- Production company: Robertson-Cole Pictures Corporation
- Distributed by: Film Booking Offices of America (FBO)
- Release date: May 26, 1924 (USA)
- Running time: 60 mins.
- Language: English

The Danger Line (also known as The Battle) is a 1924 American silent film directed by Édouard-Émile Violet and featuring Sessue Hayakawa, Tsuru Aoki, Gina Palerme and Francis Ward (Félix Ford) in pivotal roles. It was produced by Robertson-Cole Pictures Corporation and premiered in USA on May 26, 1924. The American Film Institute Catalog of Motion Picture lists it under Americanization.

== Cast ==
- Sessue Hayakawa - Marquis Yorisaka
- Tsuru Aoki - Marquise Yorisaka
- Gina Palerme - Mrs. Hockey
- Cady Winter - Miss Vane
- Felix Ward - Captain Fergan

== Preservation ==
With no prints of The Danger Line located in any film archives, it is considered a lost film.
