= Bianca Ferguson =

American actress from Gary, Indiana

Bianca Ferguson / Taylor
- Born: Debra Thomas; February 11, 1955 (age 71); Gary, Indiana, U.S.
- Occupation: Actress
- Years active: 1978–2020
- Spouse: Meshach Taylor (m. 1983; died 2014)
- Children: 3

Bianca (Ferguson) Taylor (born February 11, 1955) is an American actress from Gary, Indiana, USA.

Ferguson married fellow actor Meshach Taylor in 1983; with Taylor, she had three children.

== Career and filmography ==
Ferguson is best known for playing Claudia Johnston Phillips on the soap opera General Hospital in 87 episodes from 1979 to 1987.

She has more recently appeared in episodes of Grey's Anatomy, Criminal Minds and True Detective.
