= Une idylle à la ferme =

- Max seeks forgiveness from the eldest daughter (left) for falling in love with the youngest (right).
- Directed by: Max Linder
- Written by: Max Linder
- Starring: See below
- Distributed by: Pathé
- Release date: 1912
- Country: France
- Language: French

Une idylle à la ferme is a 1912 French short film written and directed by and starring Max Linder. It is known as A Farm-house Romance in the United Kingdom. In this Pathé comedy, Max, an "elegant but disaster-prone man-about-town," visits a farm to meet a prospective wife at the behest of his wealthy uncle.

== Plot ==
Tired of supporting his freeloading nephew, Max's uncle arranges an introduction between Max and an old friend who has a farm and two unmarried daughters. Max's uncle suggests the eldest daughter as a good match, but she fears that Max will be more interested in her younger sister. So, it is arranged that during Max's visit, the younger daughter would be disguised as the maid. Unfortunately, Max is immediately taken by the maid. As a distraction, a tour of the farm is suggested, during which Max takes every opportunity to sneak away to see the maid as she performs chores such as milking the cow. Max gets separated in an attempt to hide his attentions to the maid from the father and ultimately finds his way back to the main house where he finds the maid on the father's lap. Max reacts with outrage, and the father reveals the deception. With everything cleared up, Max proposes to the youngest daughter and she and the father accept. At this point, the eldest daughter rejoins the group and is angry to learn that despite her precautions, her fears were realized after all. Max entreats her for forgiveness and she relents.

== Cast ==
- Max Linder as Max
- Suzy Depsy as Suzette

== Release ==
Une idylle à la ferme premiered on 14 June 1912 in Vienna and 20 December 1912 in the US.
