= Pál Erdőss =

Pál Erdőss (February 9, 1947 – February 14, 2007) was a Hungarian film director, producer, and screenwriter. His work include feature and documentary films.

== Filmography ==
- 1983: The Princess (Hungarian: Adj király katonát)

== Awards ==
- 1983: Caméra d'Or, 1983 Cannes Film Festival, for The Princess
- 1983: Golden Leopard at the 1983 Locarno International Film Festival.
- 1987: Béla Balázs Award "for his feature and documentary films on contemporary themes"
- 1991:Golden Dolphine at the Tróia International Film Festival for Homo Novus
