= Max Linder =

French actor and director (1883–1925)

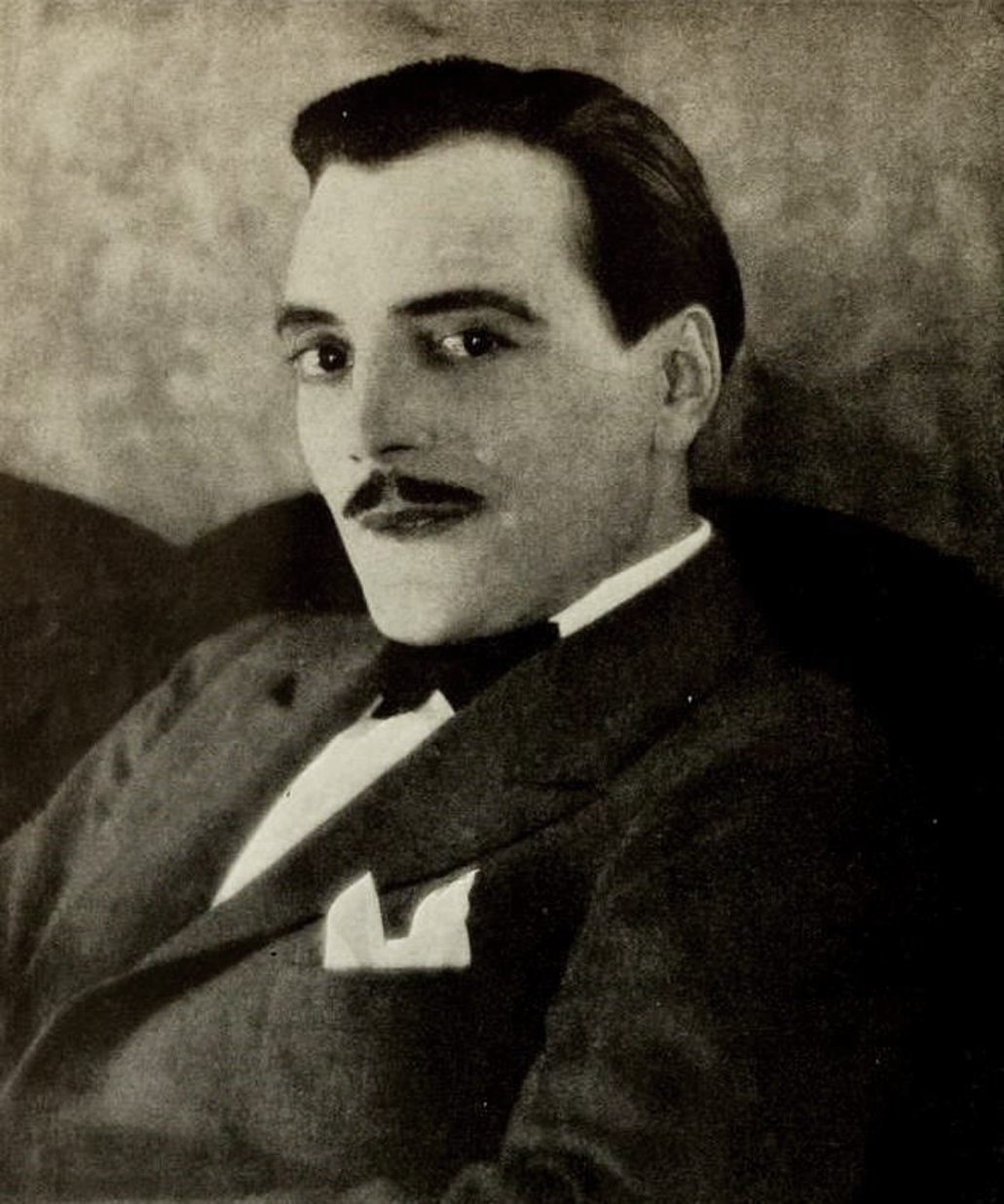
- Linder in the February 1922 issue of Photoplay
- Born: Gabriel-Maximilien Leuvielle; 16 December 1883; Cavernes, Saint-Loubès, Gironde, France
- Died: 1 November 1925 (aged 41); Paris, France
- Occupations: Actor; director; screenwriter; producer; comedian
- Years active: 1899–1925
- Spouse: Hélène "Ninette" Peters (m. 1923)
- Children: Maud Linder

Gabriel-Maximilien Leuvielle (16 December 1883 – 1 November 1925), known professionally as Max Linder (French: [maks lɛ̃.dɛʁ]), was a French actor, director, screenwriter, producer, and comedian of the silent film era. His onscreen persona "Max" was one of the first recognizable recurring characters in film. He has also been cited as the "first international movie star" and "the first film star anywhere".

Born in Cavernes, France to Catholic parents, Linder grew up with a passion for theater and enrolled in the Conservatoire de Bordeaux in 1899. He soon received awards for his performances and continued to pursue a career in the legitimate theater. He became a contract player with the Bordeaux Théâtre des Arts from 1901 to 1904, performing in plays by Molière, Pierre Corneille, and Alfred de Musset.

From the summer of 1905, Linder appeared in short comedy films for Pathé, at first usually in supporting roles. His first major film role was in the Georges Méliès-like fantasy film The Legend of Punching. During the following years, Linder made several hundred short films portraying "Max", a wealthy and dapper man-about-town frequently in hot water because of his penchant for beautiful women and the good life. Starting with The Skater's Debut in 1907, the character became one of the first identifiable motion-picture characters who appeared in successive situation comedies. By 1911, Linder was co-directing his own films (with René LePrince) as well as writing the scripts.

Linder enlisted at the outbreak of the First World War, and worked at first as a dispatch driver and entertainer. During his service, he was injured several times, and the experiences reportedly had a devastating effect on him both physically and mentally. Linder later moved to the U.S. but was unable to achieve success. He died in 1925 in a purported suicide pact with his wife in Paris.

== Life and career ==
=== Early life ===
Max Linder was born Gabriel Leuvielle near Saint-Loubès, Gironde. He was called "Max" from a young age. His parents, Jean and Suzanne (née Baron), were wealthy vineyard owners and expected Linder to take over the family business; his older brother Maurice (28 June 1881 – 14 December 1959) had become a celebrated national rugby player. But Linder grew up with a passion for theater, and was enthralled by the traveling theater and circus performances that occasionally visited his town. He later wrote that "nothing was more distasteful to me than the thought of a life among the grapes."

As a child, Linder fell victim to a severe case of cholera. He survived by resting in the oven of the village baker. The heat from the oven supposedly brought down the infection to a manageable level.

In the spring of 1888, the Leuvielle family's plantation was attacked by grape phylloxera. Jean and Suzanne heavily considered emigrating to America, and embarked on a trip to New York in search for propitious offers. During their trip, Max and Maurice remained in France with their grandmother Jeanne. Nothing became of Jean and Suzanne's plans to emigrate, as it was discovered that the French vines could be replaced with American plants, which were sturdier and resistant to phylloxera.

While in New York, Suzanne gave birth to Max's younger brother, Gérard. They returned to France, and, two years later, a sister, Marcelle, was born. Max developed a particular affection for her. Marcelle, along with Suzanne and Jean, appeared in Max's film Max Is Convalescent (1911) and Marcelle starred alongside Max in Max, The Heartbreaker (1917).

=== Early career 1899–1905 ===
In 1899, Linder enrolled in the Conservatoire de Bordeaux and quickly won awards for first prize in comedy and second prize in tragedy. He continued to pursue a career in the theater and became a contract player with the Bordeaux Théâtre des Arts from 1901 to 1904, performing in plays by Molière, Pierre Corneille and Alfred de Musset. At the same time that he was performing in serious dramatic theater, he became friends with Charles le Bargy of the Comédie-Française. Le Bargy encouraged Linder to audition for the Conservatoire de Paris in 1904. Linder was rejected and began appearing in less prestigious theaters such as the Olympia Theater and the Théâtre de l'Ambigu.

By 1905, he had adopted his stage name of Max Linder and used it in several theatrical performances. Also during this period, Linder applied for work at Pathé Frères in Vincennes at the suggestion of film director Louis Gasnier and began appearing in small bit parts, mostly in slapstick comedies. Linder continued to appear on the stage for the next two years and was not a significant film star at first. However, an often-told legend about the origins of Linder's film career is that French film producer Charles Pathé personally saw Linder on the stage and wrote him a note that read "In your eyes lies a fortune. Come and act in front of my cameras, and I will help make it."

=== Film career 1905–1916 ===
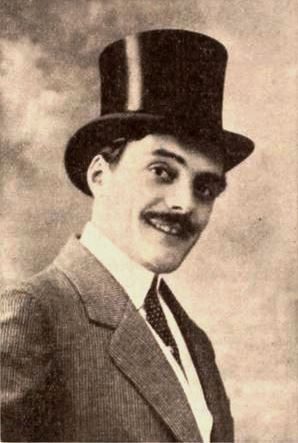
Linder in March 1918

From 1905 to 1907, Linder appeared in dozens of short comedy films for Pathé, usually in a supporting role. His first noticeably larger film role was in The Young Man's First Outing in 1905. He also appeared in Georges Méliès-like fantasy films such as Serpentine Dances and The Legend of Punching, his first leading role. His rise to stardom commenced in 1907 when Pathé's slapstick star René Gréhan left the company to join Éclair. Gréhan's screen character was Gontran, whose persona included high-society clothing and a dandy-ish demeanor. Linder was chosen to take over the characterization for Pathé, and the style of dress and personality of Gréhan's character became his trademark. Film critic David Robinson described Linder's screen persona as "no grotesque: he was young, handsome, debonair, immaculate...in silk hat, jock coat, cravat, spats, patent shoes, and swagger cane." Linder made more than one hundred short films portraying "Max", a wealthy and dapper man-about-town frequently in hot water because of his penchant for beautiful women and the good life. With this character, he had created one of the first identifiable motion-picture characters who appeared in successive situation comedies.

Linder's first appearance as "Max" was in The Skater's Debut in 1907. Lake Daumesnil in Paris had frozen over and director Louis Gasnier filmed Linder in his new attire, with Linder improvising the rest. In the film, "Max" falls about and does a rendition of "the windmill routine" by spinning his cane around, predating Charlie Chaplin's version in The Rink by nine years. Pathé was unimpressed with the film and re-shot parts of it, and it was not popular with audiences when released. Soon afterwards, Gasnier left Pathé and moved to Italy, leaving Linder without a supporter at Pathé; he made few films in 1908. His luck began to change when Pathé's top comedy star, André Deed, left to work with the Italian film company Itala, leaving Linder as the company's leading comedic actor. Later in 1909, Gasnier returned from Italy and immediately began working with Linder again. The team made several shorts in 1909 with Linder in various roles, such as a blind elderly man and a coquettish young woman. But they soon discovered that the character of "Max" was the most popular with audiences and stuck with him from then on. Among the popular "Max" films made by Linder and Grasnier in 1909 are A Young Lady Killer and The Cure for Cowardice.

By 1910, Linder had proved himself to Pathé and was quickly becoming one of the most popular film actors in the world. When Gasnier was sent to the United States later that year to oversee Pathé's productions there, Lucien Nonguet took over as Linder's director. Together they made such films as Max Takes a Bath and the autobiographical Max Linder's Film Debut, which fictitiously recreates the legend of Linder's early film career and includes Charles Pathé as himself.

By the end of the year, Linder had become the most popular film actor in the world. Although actress Florence Lawrence is often referred to as "The First Movie Star" in the United States, Linder appears to be the very first worldwide movie star with a major following. In Russia, he was voted the most popular film actor, ahead of Asta Nielsen. He also had a Russian impersonator, Zozlov, and a devoted fan in Czar Nicholas II. Another professed fan was British playwright George Bernard Shaw. The first feature film ever made in Bulgaria was a remake of one of Linder's earlier movies. He was offered $12,000 to spend a month in Berlin making public appearances with his film screenings, but had to decline for health reasons. In France, a Max Linder movie theater had opened in Paris.

At the height of his fame, Linder ended 1910 with a serious illness. He was forced to stop making films when appendicitis left him bedridden, and some newspapers reported that he had died. He eventually recovered the following spring and began making films again in May 1911.

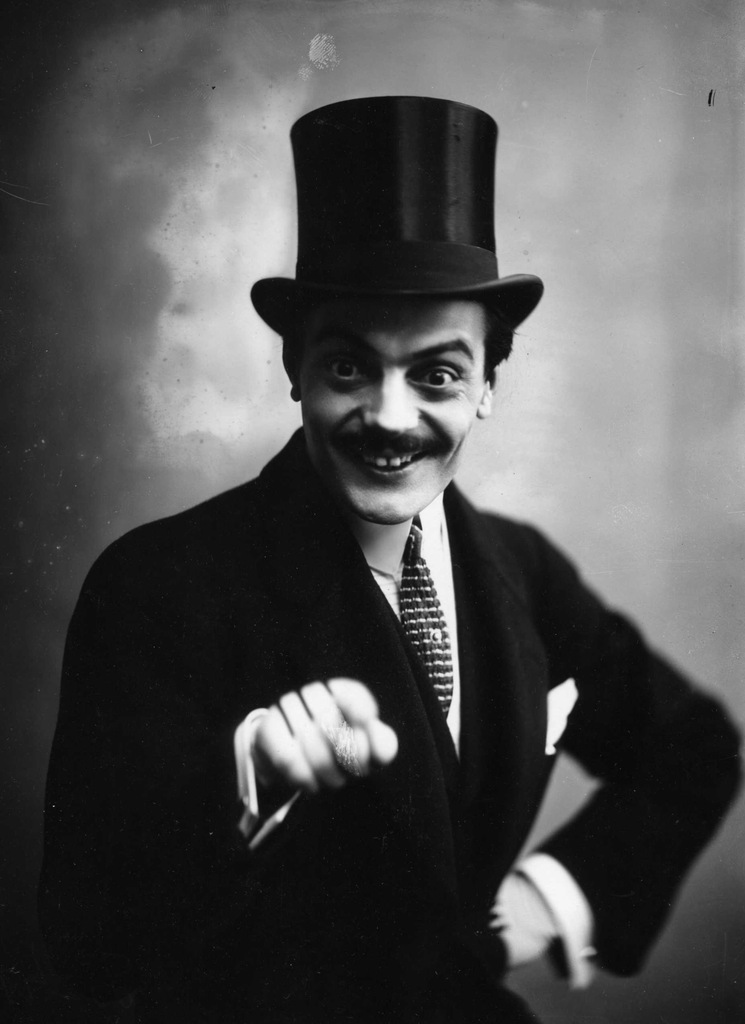
Linder in 1913

In 1911, Linder returned to filmmaking and began co-directing his own films (with René LePrince) as well as writing the scripts. By 1912, he was the solo director of his films. Gaining complete control over his own films brought positive results both critically and commercially; the films Linder made during this period are generally considered to be his best. Max, Victim of Quinine is considered by film critic Jean Mitry to be "his masterpiece." In the film, an intoxicated "Max" gets into numerous fights with such dignitaries as the Minister of War, an ambassador and the police commissioner, all of whom challenge him to a duel and present him with their business cards. Eventually "Max" is apprehended by the police, who attempt to return him to his residence, but end up mistakenly taking him to the homes of the various men whom he had previously fought with.

The universality of silent films brought Linder fame and fortune throughout Europe, making him the highest paid entertainer of the day, with a salary increase of 150,000 francs (the average monthly salary in France was 100 francs at the time). He began touring Europe with his films from 1911 to 1912, including Spain, where he entertained thousands of fans at the Barcelona railway station, Austria, and Russia, where he was accompanied on piano by a young Dimitri Tiomkin. In 1912 after the tour, Linder demanded and received a salary of one million francs a year, and Charles Pathé used the huge sum to generate publicity, with an ad reading "We understand that the shackles which bind Max Linder have attained the value of one million francs a year...the imagination boggles at such a figure!" This set a precedent in the entertainment industry for actors' salaries that would become a staple of the Hollywood system, but privately Pathé nicknamed Linder "The Napoleon of the Cinema".

The high point of Linder's career was from 1912 to 1914. His films were made with increased skill and "Max" was at his funniest. He made such films as Max Virtuoso, Max Does Not Speak English, Max and His Dog, Max's Hat and Max and the Jealous Husband. His ensemble of actors included Stacia Napierkowska, Jane Renouardt, Gaby Morlay, and occasional performances from the young actors Abel Gance and Maurice Chevalier. Linder had given Chevalier his start in movies, but the silent medium did not suit Chevalier, who stuck to the stage until the all-singing all-dancing features came in, many years later.

The outbreak of World War I brought a temporary end to Linder's film career in 1914, but not before he made the short patriotic film The Second of August that year. Linder attempted to enlist in the French army, but was physically unfit for combat duty. Instead he worked as a dispatch driver between Paris and the front lines. Many conflicting stories about the reasons behind his dismissal from the army exist, including that he was shot through the lung, and seriously wounded. Initially, it was reported by one newspaper that he had been killed; Linder actually phoned the offending publishers, leading them to run the headline "Max Linder Not Killed". However, others have asserted that he became infected with pneumonia after hiding from a German patrol in icy water for several hours. After being dismissed from his duties, Linder spent the remainder of the war entertaining the troops and making films. It was also during this period that Linder had his first serious bout with chronic depression.

=== Move to the U.S. and career decline 1916–1925 ===
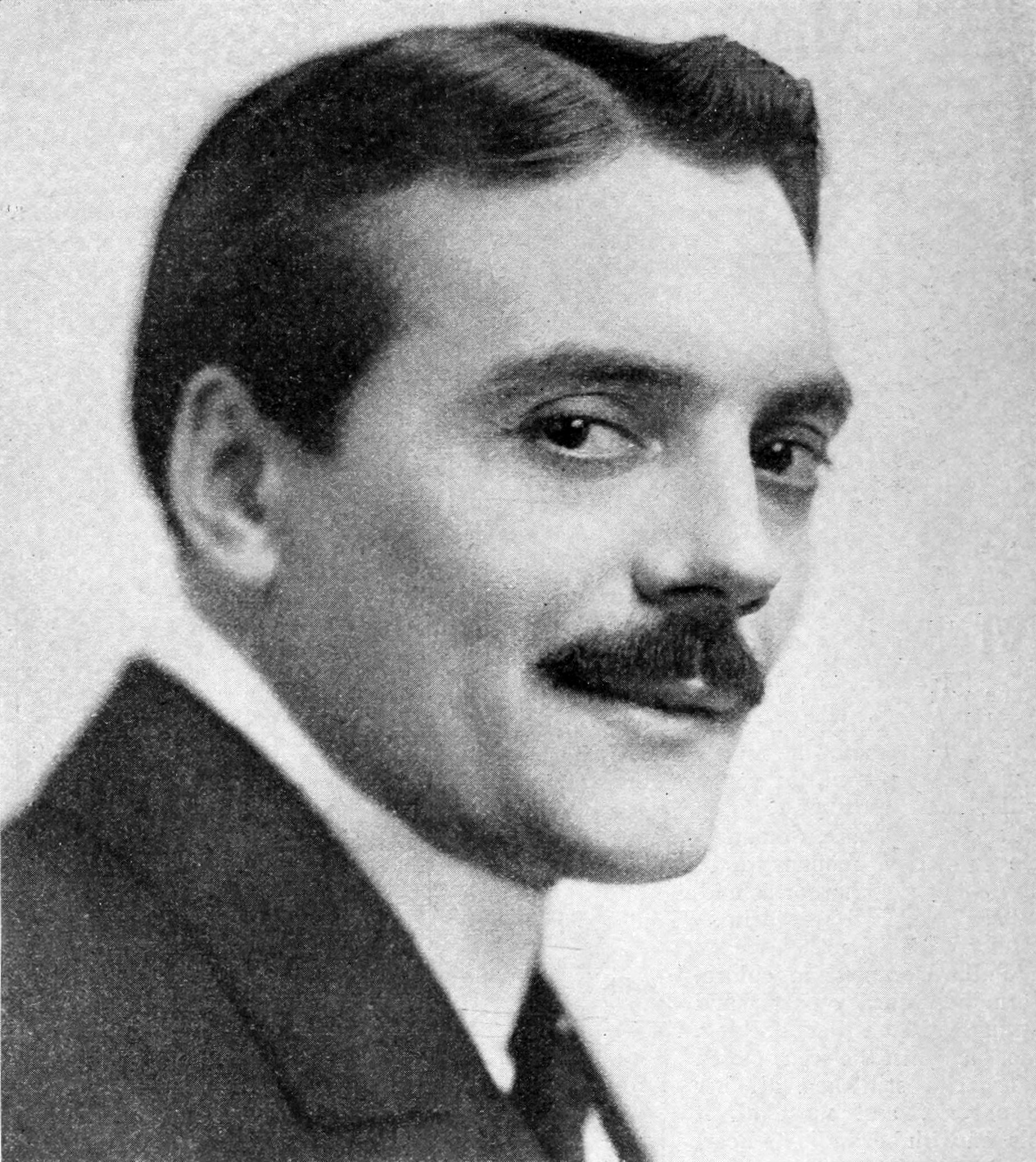
Linder c. 1917

In 1916, Linder was approached by American film producer George K. Spoor, the president of the Essanay Film Manufacturing Company, to make twelve short films for him in the US at a salary of $5,000 a week. Earlier that year, Charlie Chaplin, then the most popular comedian in the world, had left Essanay for more money and independence at Mutual Film and Spoor wanted to replace Chaplin with Max Linder, whose pantomime skills were arguably equally accomplished. Linder was offered a new contract from Charles Pathé, but accepted Spoor's offer and moved to the United States to work for Essanay later that year. Unfortunately his first few American-made "Max" films were unpopular both critically and financially. The first two, Max Comes Across and Max Wants a Divorce were complete failures, but the third film, Max and his Taxi was moderately successful. The financially troubled studio may have been counting on Linder to restore its flagging fortunes and cancelled production of the remaining films on Linder's contract. Max and his Taxi had been shot in Hollywood and while there Linder had developed a close friendship with Charlie Chaplin. They would often attend events such as boxing matches or car races together, and according to writer Jack Spears, "while working on a picture Linder would go next door to Chaplin's home and discuss the day's shooting. The two often sat until dawn, developing and refining the gags. Chaplin's suggestions were invaluable, Linder said."

Scene from The Little Café

Linder returned to France in 1917 and opened a movie theater, the Ciné Max Linder. However, due to his depression and anxiety about the still ongoing war, he was unable to continue making films on a regular basis, and was often quoted by journalists about the horrors of the front lines. After the Armistice in 1918, Linder was able to regain his enthusiasm and agreed to make a film with director Raymond Bernard, the feature length The Little Café in 1919. In the film, Linder plays a waiter who suddenly becomes a millionaire, but simultaneously is tricked into a twenty-year contract to be a waiter by the cafe owner. The film made over a million francs in Europe and briefly revived his career, but was financially unsuccessful in the US.

Four years after failing to become a major star in the U.S., Linder made another attempt at filmmaking in Hollywood and formed his own production company there in 1921. His first film back in the U.S. was Seven Years Bad Luck, considered by some to be his best film. The film contains one of the earliest (though not the first) examples on film of the "human mirror" gag best known in the scene between Groucho and Harpo Marx in Duck Soup twelve years later. Linder next made Be My Wife later that year, but again neither films were able to find a major audience in the U.S.

Linder then decided to dispense with the "Max" character and try something different for his third (and final) attempt: The Three Must-Get-Theres in 1922. The film is a satire of swashbuckling films made by Douglas Fairbanks and is loosely based on the plot of Alexandere Dumas' The Three Musketeers. The film was praised by Fairbanks and Charlie Chaplin, but again failed at the box office. At the films premiere, Linder had said to director Robert Florey "You see, Bob, I sense that I'm no longer funny; I have so many preoccupations that I can no longer concentrate on my film character ... The public is mildly amused by my situations, but this evening where were the explosions of laughter that we hear when Charlie's on the screen?...Make people laugh, its easy to say make people laugh, but I don't feel funny anymore."

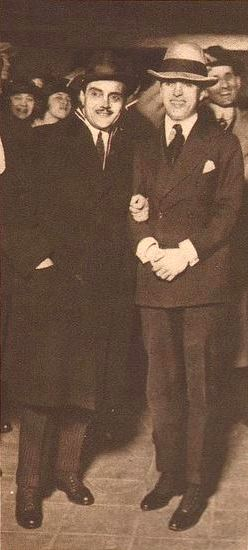
Max Linder and Charlie Chaplin in 1922

With his depression making it difficult for him to work, Linder returned to France in 1922 and shortly afterwards made a semi-serious film: Au Secours! (Help!) for director Abel Gance. The film is essentially a horror film set in a haunted house, with occasional moments of comedy by Linder. The film was released in England in 1924 and was critically praised, however the legal copyright of the film prevented it from being released in France or the US for several years. Linder's last film was The King of the Circus directed by Édouard-Émile Violet (with pre-production collaboration from Jacques Feyder) and filmed in Vienna in 1925. In the film, "Max" joins a circus in order to be closer to the woman that he loves. The film includes such gags as a hungover "Max" waking up in a department store and the film's plot is similar to the Charlie Chaplin film The Circus (1928). In late 1925, Linder was working on pre-production for his next film Barkas le fol, which would never be made.

== Marriage and death ==
As a consequence of his war service, Linder had continuing health problems, including bouts of severe depression and several mental breakdowns. It has been said that he made "tantrum-like appearances at the studio". Director Édouard-Émile Violet recalled that Linder seemed invariably "unstable, worried..." Linder also became a heavy user of opium in the 1920s, which could have further harrowed his mind.

During his war service, Linder was involved in a car accident; he was thrown out of the vehicle and badly injured.

In early April 1923, Linder was involved in a second near fatal car accident in Nice, which resulted in a head injury. He was arrested in Nice later that month for "kidnapping a minor", who happened to be his future wife, the seventeen-year-old Hélène "Ninette" Peters. They had planned to run away to Monte Carlo.

Upon Linder and Peters' first encounter at a hotel in Chamonix, Linder was entranced by her, exclaiming to a friend, "I spent the whole night in a hotel lounge talking to the most extraordinary girl I could ever imagine. Instantly I knew this to be the woman in my life." They married on 2 August 1923 at the Parisian church of St. Honoré d'Eylau. The two lived in an apartment at 11 Bis Avenue Émile Deschanel.

Linder is said to have been a fiercely jealous and mentally abusive husband. He would often accuse his young wife of being unfaithful and threaten to "end her". Whenever he went to town alone in the evenings, he would call her to make sure that she had not gone out without his consent.

Linder and his wife may have made a suicide pact. On 24 February 1924, they were both found unconscious at a hotel in Vienna, though this was explained as an accidental overdose of "sleeping powder." In late October 1925, Max and Hélène reportedly attended a Paris screening of Quo Vadis (in which two characters, Petronius and his slave Eunice, as a reporter put it, "bleed themselves to death"), and died in a similar manner. They drank Veronal, injected morphine and slashed their wrists. Peters died first, while Linder was unconscious throughout 31 October, with doctors fighting to keep him alive. He died after midnight on 1 November.

There is still some question, however, as to whether the deaths were really a result of a suicide pact, or whether Max murdered his much-younger wife or pressured her into killing herself. On 2 November 1925, The New York Times reported that Hélène Linder had told her mother by letter, "He will kill me." The article also claims that "no one believes she herself opened her veins." Critic Vincent Canby acknowledged in 1988 that "Linder died with his young wife in what has sometimes been described as a suicide pact, and sometimes as a murder-suicide." In addition, Maud Linder reported in her memoir that the head of the workmen at Linder's house in Neuilly overheard Max tell a friend, probably Armand Massard, that he planned to kill his wife along with himself, as he could not bear the thought of her belonging to another after he was gone.

Linder was buried at the Catholique cimetière de Saint-Loubès. His wife is buried at Père Lachaise Cemetery in Paris.

== Legacy ==
Upon receiving the news of Linder's death, Chaplin is reported to have closed his studio for one day out of respect.

In the ensuing years, his jealous and alcoholic elder brother won custody of sixteen-month-old heiress Maud Linder to get the girl's fortune, before her grandmother (Hélène's mother) legally fought back and took over. Meanwhile, many of his films were lost because most reels had been buried unprotected in a garden. Max Linder had been relegated to little more than a footnote in film history until a compilation film titled Laugh with Max Linder premiered at the Venice Film Festival and was theatrically released. The film was a compilation of Linder's last three films made in Hollywood and its release was supervised by Maud Linder.

In 1983, Maud Linder made a documentary film, The Man in the Silk Hat, about Linder's life and career. It was screened out of competition at the 1983 Cannes Film Festival. In 1992, Maud Linder published a book about Linder in France, Max Linder was my father and in 2008 she received the Prix Henri Langlois for her work to promote her father's legacy. In his honor, Lycée Max Linder, a public school in the city of Libourne in the Gironde département near his birthplace was given his name in 1981.

Linder's influence on film comedy and particularly on slapstick films is that the genre shifted from the "knockabout" comedies made by such people as Mack Sennett and André Deed to a more subtle, refined and character driven medium that would later be dominated by Chaplin, Buster Keaton, Harold Lloyd, and others. Linder's influence on Chaplin is apparent both from Chaplin's sometimes borrowing gags or entire plot-lines from Linder's films, as well as from a famous signed photo that Chaplin sent Linder which read: "To Max, the Professor, from his disciple, Charlie Chaplin." Mack Sennett and King Vidor also singled out Linder as a great influence on their directing careers. His high society characterizations as "Max" also influenced such actors as Adolphe Menjou and Raymond Griffith.

In his heyday, Linder had two major rivals in France: Léonce Perret and Charles Prince. Perret later became a successful director, but his early career included a series of "Léonce" slapstick shorts that were popular but nowhere near the stature of Linder's films. Charles Prince, on the other hand, was gaining popularity during his career and was nearly equal to Linder by the beginning of World War I. Prince's screen persona was "Rigadin", who like "Max" was a bumbling bourgeois socialite who always got into trouble. Both Linder and Prince were employed by Pathé in the early 1910s and they often used the same story lines, sets and directors. Years after both comedians' careers were long over, Linder has received several revivals in interest while Charles Prince remains mostly forgotten.

== In popular media ==
Linder is referenced in Quentin Tarantino's Inglourious Basterds where the owner of a cinema in Nazi occupied Paris in 1944, Shosanna Dreyfus, says that she will be having a Max Linder festival. The relative merits of Linder and Chaplin are then discussed by the German soldier, Frederick Zoller, who argues that Linder is superior to Chaplin while also admitting that Linder never made anything as good as The Kid. The documentary film The Mystery of the King of Kinema portraits Linder and his impact through interviews (including Maud Linder), silent film excerpts and the Spanish-American actor Julio Perillán characterized as Linder and voicing answers from old press interviews. Perillán was nominated to the Goya awards for best lead actor. The award-winning feature-length documentary, Life and Deaths of Max Linder, released in 2024 and screened at film festivals throughout Europe including the prestigious Camerimage.

== Selected filmography ==
- 1905 The Legend of Punching
- 1906 Le pendu (The Man Who Hanged Himself AKA Attempted Suicide)
- 1907 The Skater's Debut
- 1909 A Young Lady Killer
- 1909 Max And The Lady Doctor
- 1909 The Cure for Cowardice
- 1910 Max Goes Skiing
- 1910 Max Takes a Bath
- 1910 Max Linder's Film Debut (Les Debuts de Max au Cinema)
- 1911 Max en Convalescence
- 1911 Max, Victim of Quinine
- 1911 Max and His Mother-in-Law
- 1911 Max Takes Tonics
- 1911 Max Prends un Bain (Max takes a Bath)
- 1912 A Farm-House Romance
- 1912 Max Lance La Mode
- 1912 Max and His Dog
- 1912 L'Amour Tenace
- 1912 Max a Peux de l'Eau (Max is Scared of the Water)
- 1912 Max et Jane veulant faire du Theatre
- 1912 The Romance of Max
- 1912 Une nuit agitée (An Agitated Night AKA Max in One Exciting Night)
- 1912 A Waterplane Elopement
- 1912 Entente Cordiale
- 1913 Max's Hat
- 1913 Max Takes a Picture
- 1913 Max's First Job
- 1913 Max Virtuoso
- 1913 Les Vacance de Max
- 1913 Max Pedicure
- 1914 Max Does Not Speak English
- 1914 Max and the Jealous Husband
- 1914 The Second of August
- 1914 Max and His Mother-in-Law (Max et sa Belle-Mere)
- 1916 Max and the Clutching Hand
- 1917 Max Comes Across
- 1917 Max Wants a Divorce
- 1917 Max and His Taxi
- 1919 The Little Cafe
- 1921 Seven Years Bad Luck
- 1921 Be My Wife
- 1922 The Three Must-Get-Theres
- 1924 Au Secours!
- 1925 The King of the Circus
- The Porter from Maxim's (1927, screenplay)
