= The Three Must-Get-Theres =

1922 film by Max Linder

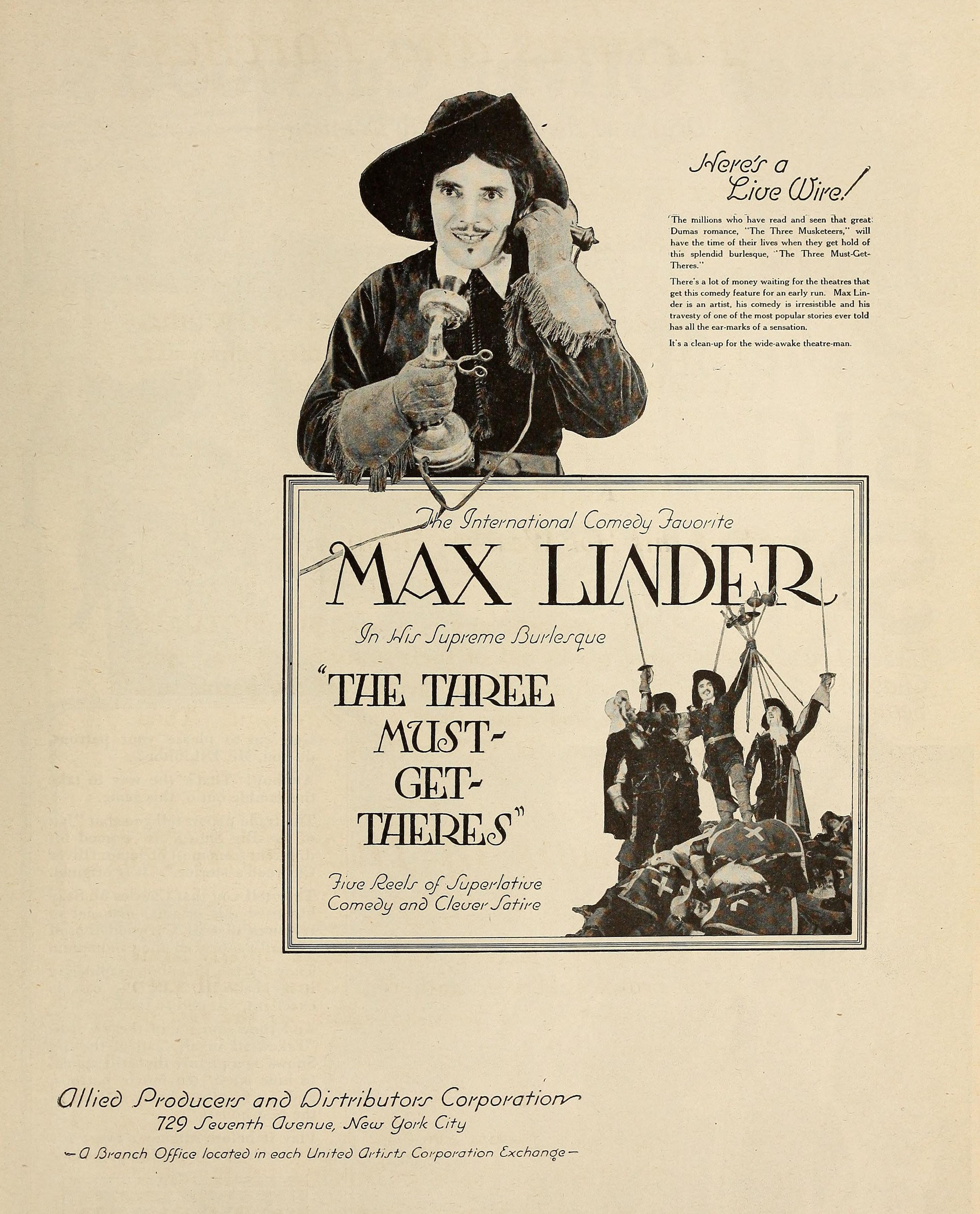
- Directed by: Max Linder
- Written by: Max Linder
- Produced by: Max Linder
- Starring: See below
- Cinematography: Max Dupont; Enrique Juan Vallejo
- Distributed by: United Artists
- Release date: August 27, 1922
- Running time: 55 min - abridged versions 37 min
- Country: United States
- Language: Silent (English intertitles)

The Three Must-Get-Theres

The Three Must-Get-Theres is a 1922 American silent film directed by Max Linder. The film follows the plot of the 1844 novel The Three Musketeers by Alexandre Dumas. It is also meant as a parody of the previously released 1921 film The Three Musketeers, starring Douglas Fairbanks.

This was Linder's final American film before returning to Europe where he co-directed his last completed film in Austria, Max, der Zirkuskönig (Max, King of the Circus).

== Plot summary ==
Dart-In-Again, a young and poor nobleman from Gascony travels to Paris hoping to become one of the King's musketeers. When he first encounter three musketeers, Walrus, Octopus and Porpoise, he starts duelling with them but rapidly becomes their friend. Together they fight the guards of Li'l Cardinal Richie-Loo, main Minister of King Louis XIII.

Queen Ann is desperate because the Cardinal has discovered that she has given the jewels offered to her by the King to her lover Lord Duke Poussy Bunkumin. Dart-In-Again crosses the English Channel on his sailing horse to recover them and returns them to the Queen just in time to save her honour. In the course of his adventures, he falls in love with Constance Bonne-aux-Fieux. The King rewards Dart-In-Again by appointing him as a musketeer and celebrates his wedding with Constance.

== Cast ==
- Max Linder as Dart-In-Again
- Bull Montana as Li'l Cardinal Richie-Loo
- Frank Cooke as King Louis XIII
- Jobyna Ralston as Constance Bonne-aux-Fieux

== Critical response ==
On August 28, 1922, The New York Times wrote: ″(...) it is good-natured and lots of fun. If it lacks subtlety and pointed satire, it abounds in broad and whole-hearted mockery. Its method is that of absurdification. Following Fairbanks in the story almost step by step, it parallels, rather than follows him, in its treatment of each incident of the narrative. The Fairbanks version runs along the line of the romantic. The Linder version runs along the line of the ridiculous. (...) It is content to be a burlesque. So you can enjoy both films and neither will impair your enjoyment of the other.″
