= Max and His Mother-in-Law =

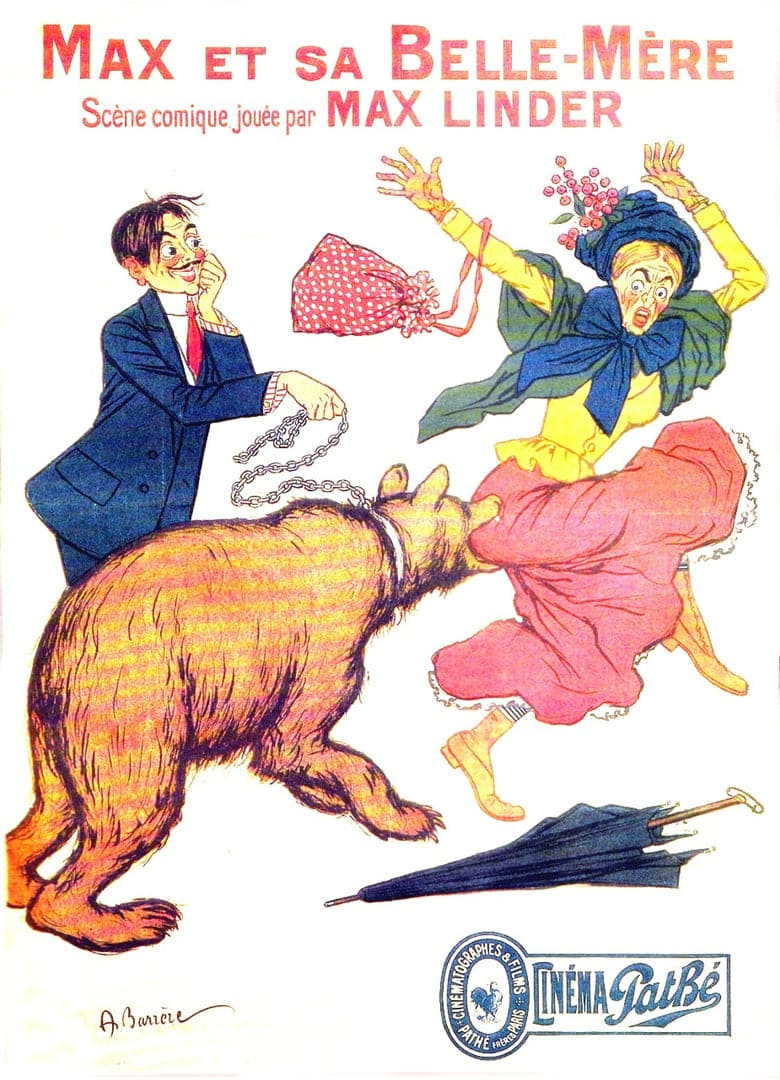
- Directed by: Max Linder; Lucien Nonguet
- Written by: Max Linder
- Starring: See below
- Release date: 1914
- Country: France
- Language: French

Max and His Mother-in-Law (French: Max et sa belle-mère) is the title of both a 1911 and 1914 French film directed by Max Linder, Lucien Nonguet. The 1914 film is not a remake. The film is also known as Max and His Ma-in-Law (in the United Kingdom).

== Plot ==
Max and his young bride attempt to enjoy an Alpine honeymoon, despite the presence of her mother.

== Cast ==
- Max Linder as Max

Léon Belières, Charles de Rochefort, Gabrielle Lange, Paulette Lorsy, Pâquerette and Jacques Vandenne also appear.
