= Red Roses and Petrol =

- Theatrical release poster
- Directed by: Tamar Simon Hoffs
- Written by: Tamar Simon Hoffs; Joseph O'Connor (play)
- Produced by: Georganne Aldrich Heller; Tamar Simon Hoffs; Alfred Sapse; Gail Stayden
- Starring: Malcolm McDowell; Max Beesley; Susan Lynch
- Cinematography: Nancy Schreiber
- Edited by: Daithí Keane
- Music by: Seth Podowitz; Flogging Molly; Susanna Hoffs
- Distributed by: World Wide Motion Pictures Corp.
- Release date: 2003
- Country: United States
- Language: English

Red Roses and Petrol is a 2003 American drama film based on the stage play of the same name by Joseph O'Connor. The film was directed by Tamar Simon Hoffs, and stars Malcolm McDowell and Max Beesley. It was released, on DVD, in 2008.

== Plot ==
Amid a haze of cigarette smoke and uneaten food, the family of Enda Doyle (Malcolm McDowell) gathers in Dublin for his wake. A university librarian, poet, and complicated man, he has left behind a trail of unresolved issues, a dysfunctional family, and a disturbing mystery. Red Roses and Petrol, a darkly comic feature film by director Tamar Simon Hoffs, explores the emotional twists and turns of familial relationships.

Enda's dazed widow, Moya (Olivia Tracey), anxiously prepares for the next day's funeral with her still stuck-at-home, twenty-something daughter Medbh (Maeve) (Heather Juergensen), lending a loving hand. Moya's desperation to keep her family together and Medbh's sharp tongue provide the backdrop for the arrival from New York of headstrong older sister Catherine (Susan Lynch), with her handsome but awkward boyfriend Tom (Greg Ellis) in tow. They doubt that London-based Johnny (Max Beesley), the angry black sheep brother of the family, will appear at all. Sorting through boxes of Enda's books, the women discover a cache of self-recorded video diaries that might shed light on who Enda Doyle really was, and some of the secrets of his life that he was never able to share with them.

At the funeral, the daughters see a distraught young woman from the university, Helen (Catherine Farrell), rumored to be having an affair with Enda. They're stunned that she would show up so brazenly at a family gathering for the deceased Enda. Returning home, they find Johnny emerging half-naked from the shower, after a quick tryst with a stewardess he met on his flight from London. A brilliant, wounded slacker, Johnny manages to irritate everyone to the edge of violence with his biting and sarcastic recall of the family's long-buried memories. Johnny's confrontational behavior and bitter assessment of life with his father, incite the clan into what can only be called unchecked family therapy.

Throughout the ensuing arguments, which reach a fevered pitch as the family gets inebriated waiting for guests to arrive for the wake, we learn about the powerful and ambiguous force that was Enda Doyle. Finally, Catherine cannot contain herself and accuses Moya of being blind to her husband's infidelity and by extension causing great harm to herself and her children. In a surprising twist, Enda's own videotapes give the family the answers they returned home to find.

== Cast ==
- Malcolm McDowell as Enda Doyle
- Olivia Tracey as Moya Doyle
- Heather Juergensen as Medbh Doyle
- Max Beesley as Johnny Doyle
- Susan Lynch as Catherine Doyle
- Greg Ellis as Tom Ivers
- Catherine Farrell as Helen
- Aubrey Morris as The Chaplain
- Robert Easton as Jim
- Sean Lawlor as Professor Thompson

== Awards ==
The film won first prize at the Avignon Film Festival, was runner-up at the Westwood Film Festival, and received recognition at the Deauville Film Festival, AFI Fest, the Boston Irish Film Festival, the Newport Beach Film Festival, the Toronto International Film Festival circuit, and the Palm Springs Film Festival.

== Soundtrack ==
Songs for the film are by Flogging Molly and the director's daughter Susanna Hoffs, with original music by Seth Podowitz.

As listed in the movie credits (not necessarily on the soundtrack):

- Flogging Molly - "If I Ever Leave This World Alive"
- Susanna Hoffs - "The Water Is Wide" (Irish Mix)
- Flogging Molly - "Salty Dog"
- Flogging Molly - Drunken Lullabies"
- Flogging Molly - "Devils Dance Floor"
- Susanna Hoffs - "Catch the Wind", written by Donovan
- Flogging Molly - "The Worst Day Since Yesterday"
- Flogging Molly - "The Likes of You Again"
