= Ralph Simon (rabbi) =

American Conservative rabbi (1906–1996)

Rabbi Ralph Simon רפאל סימון
- Title: Rabbi of Congregation Rodfei Zedek

Personal life
- Born: October 19, 1906 Newark, New Jersey, US
- Died: March 29, 1996 (aged 89) Palm Springs, California, US
- Spouse: Kelsey (née Hoffer) Simon
- Children: 3, including Tamar Simon Hoffs
- Parent(s): Isaac and Yetta (née Biddleman) Simon
- Education: Columbia University; Jewish Theological Seminary of America
- Occupation: Rabbi

Religious life
- Religion: Judaism
- Denomination: Conservative

Jewish leader
- Predecessor: Rabbi Jacob P. Weinstein
- Successor: Rabbi Vernon Kurtz
- Began: 1943
- Ended: 1987
- Other: President of the Rabbinical Assembly

Ralph Simon (Hebrew: רפאל סימון; October 19, 1906 – March 29, 1996) was an American Conservative rabbi. Ordained in New York in 1931, he served as Rabbi at Congregation Rodfei Zedek in Chicago from 1943 until he retired in 1987. In 1967, he was elected President of the Rabbinical Assembly and was named "Israel Bond Man of the Year" in 1976 for leading the drive in Chicago's Israel Bond effort, raising millions of dollars by convincing members of the banking community that Israel Bonds were safe.

== Early life and education ==
Ralph Simon was born October 19, 1906, in Newark, New Jersey, to parents Isaac and Yetta (née Biddleman) Simon. He received a Bachelor of Arts Degree at City College of New York (1927), a master's degree in Hebrew Literature at the Jewish Theological Seminary of America (1931), a Master of Arts Degree at Columbia University (1943), a Postgraduate Degree at the Oriental Institute University of Chicago (1947) a Doctorate of Divinity at Jewish Theological Seminary of America (1964) and a Doctorate of Hebrew literature at Spertus Institute for Jewish Learning and Leadership (1972.)

== Career ==
Simon began speaking to conservative religious congregations while earning his master's degree in Hebrew Literature at the Jewish Theological Seminary of America. After being ordained in 1931, he served as Rabbi of Rodef Sholem Synagogue in Johnstown, Pennsylvania (1931 - 1936). He was the first American-born and the first conservative rabbi to serve Rodef Sholom. He then served as Rabbi of the Jewish Center in New York City (1937–1943), followed by serving as Rabbi at the Congregation Rodfei Zedek in Chicago (1943–1987.) In 1956, Simon headed the Rodfei Zedek Institute of Adult Studies which gave lectures based on the theme "Great Jews of Our Time," with classes in Hebrew, Jewish history, the Bible, and ethics.

Simon served as Secretary of the Illinois Board of Mental Health and President of the Jewish Information Society of America. He also presided over the Rabbinical Advisory Board of the organization operating the non-profit Jewish Peoples Convalescent Home which provided care for Jews of all ages, regardless of ability to pay. In 1985, Simon published a volume of sermons, Challenges and Responses.

=== Camp Ramah ===
Simon founded Camp Ramah, the first Hebrew-speaking camping venture of the Conservative movement. He recruited 100 campers, a third from outside the Chicago area, for the camp's first summer in 1947. By 1987, the camp had grown into a network of seven camps with 3200 young people enrolled, in addition to programs in Israel. Simon explained, "It put a child in a total Jewish environment and enabled him to live the so-called ideal Jewish life from the time he got up until he went to bed .... And that was of tremendous value. Most children had never lived a complete Jewish life. Here they not only lived it, but they lived it without tension."

Celebrities who attended the camp include Ethan Slater, Ben Platt, Ben Bernanke, and Wolf Blitzer.

=== Israel Bonds ===
In 1965, Simon led the drive in convincing the American banking community that Israel bonds were a sound investments which resulted in the sale of more that $6.5 million in bonds. Simon stated, "In one year a deserted wilderness will be transformed into a busy city." In 1969, he served as general chairman of Chicago's Combined Jewish Appeal and Metropolitan Bonds for Israel and was a board member of the Jewish Federation Board of Directors. In 1976, Simon was named "Israel Bond Man of the Year."

=== Support for Jewish Students in the US ===
In the late 1960s, Simon became concerned about the indifference of American Jewish youth toward religion stating, "Jewish students are trying to shed their Jewish Identity in modern US society." He spoke to 500 Reform rabbis at the Central Conference of American Rabbis, discussing the lack of support for Jewish students and encouraging Orthodox colleagues to join them in a combined effort to challenge the growing forces of secularism in the country. Simon said the objective was to provide a "third option" to Israeli Jews whose choice at the time was limited to Orthodox Judaism.

=== Civil Rights Movement and Martin Luther King Jr. ===
L-R Police officer, Martin Luther King Jr., Ralph Simon, State trooper

Simon was one of several rabbis who participated in the Freedom Rides of 1961. He was one of five representatives of "an assemblage of rabbis and Jewish communal workers, who authored the civil rights resolution presented to United States District Court for the Northern District of Illinois Edward Hanrahan to support the voting rights bill in Congress. Martin Luther King Jr. spoke at the Rabbinical Assembly convention, which Simon presided over, in the Catskill Mountains on March 25, 1968.

== Awards and recognition ==
- 1976 - Named Man of the Year (Israel Bonds)
- 1979 - Senior Citizen Hall of Fame
- 1991 - Recipient of the Julius Rosenwald Award (Jewish Federation Metropolitan Chicago)

== Personal life and death ==
Simon was married to Kelsey (née Hoffer) Simon with whom he had three children; sons Rabbi Matthew (deceased) and Jonathan "Carmi," and daughter Tamar Simon Hoffs. He is the grandfather of Susanna Hoffs of The Bangles.

Simon died on March 29, 1996, in Palm Springs, California.
