= The Princess (1983 film) =

1983 Hungarian film by Pál Erdőss

- Directed by: Pál Erdöss
- Written by: István Kardos
- Starring: Erika Ozsda
- Cinematography: Lajos Koltai; Ferenc Pap; Gábor Szabó
- Edited by: Klára Majoros
- Music by: Gyula Fekete; Miklós Fenyõ; György Jakab; Gyõzõ Kemény; László Pásztor
- Production company: Mafilm
- Release date: May 1983 (Cannes)
- Running time: 113 minutes
- Country: Hungary
- Language: Hungarian

The Princess (Hungarian: Adj király katonát! (Note: The Hungarian title, Give a Soldier, King!, is the Hungarian name of the children's game Red Rover)) is a 1983 black and white Hungarian drama film directed by Pál Erdőss. It won the Caméra d'Or at the 1983 Cannes Film Festival, and the Golden Leopard at the 1983 Locarno International Film Festival.

== Plot ==
The story of an orphaned teenage factory worker girl Jutka.

== Cast ==
- Erika Ozsda as Jutka
- Andrea Szendrei as Zsuzsa
- Denes Diczhazi as Peter
- Árpád Tóth as Andras
- Júlia Nyakó as Zsuzsa's sister
- Lajos Soltis as Kamionos
