= Olivia Tracey =

Irish model and actress (born 1960)

- Born: Olivia Marie Tracey; 11 July 1960 (age 66); Terenure, Dublin, Ireland
- Occupations: Model, actress
- Beauty pageant titleholder
- Title: Miss Ireland 1984
- Major competitions: Miss Ireland 1984 (Winner); Miss World 1984 (6th runner-up); Miss Universe 1985 (Top 10)

Olivia Marie Tracey (born 11 July 1960) is an Irish actress, model and beauty pageant titleholder.

== Biography ==
Born Olivia Treacy in Terenure, Dublin, she attended Loreto Beaufort and University College, Dublin. She qualified as a teacher but soon took up modelling. She won Miss Ireland in 1984, and finished in the top 10 in both the Miss World contest in 1984, and the Miss Universe contest in 1985. She subsequently worked as an actress on both stage and screen, with minor roles in Agnes Browne (1999), The Island (2005) and Lucky You (2007), and a starring role in Red Roses and Petrol (2002). As of 2019, she is a model and actress living in Los Angeles.
