= Max Takes Tonics =

- Directed by: Max Linder
- Written by: Maurice Delamare
- Starring: See below
- Release date: 1911
- Country: France
- Language: French

Max Takes Tonics (French: Max victime du quinquina) is a 1911 French film directed by Max Linder.

The film is also known as Max and His Prescription (United Kingdom) and Victime du quinquina (French alternative title).

== Plot ==
Max visits a doctor who prescribes a tonic (Bordeaux of Cinchona) for him to drink every morning. Upon returning home, Max sees a large glass which was left by his wife and labeled "Souvenir de Bordeaux". He consumes it in its entirety after assuming that it was his medicine. Immediately Max feels much better. Hilarity ensues as Max goes about the day in a completely drunken state.

== Cast ==
- Max Linder as Max
- Georges Coquet
- Lucy d'Orbel
- Maurice Delamare
- Georges Gorby
- Gabrielle Lange
- Paulette Lorsy
- Jacques Vandenne
