= The Sky Is Falling (2000 film) =

- Directed by: Florrie Laurence
- Written by: Florrie Laurence
- Produced by: Brad Hall; David Parks; Howard Kazanjian
- Starring: Dedee Pfeiffer; Teri Garr; Howard Hesseman; Eric Close; Laura Leighton
- Cinematography: David Parks
- Edited by: Peggy Davis
- Music by: Adam Fields; The Four Postmen
- Distributed by: Showcase Entertainment
- Release date: 2000
- Running time: 102 minutes
- Country: United States
- Language: English
- Budget: $500,000

The Sky Is Falling is a 2000 American film written and directed by Florrie Laurence and produced by Brad Hall and David Parks. It stars Dedee Pfeiffer, Teri Garr, Howard Hesseman, and Eric Close.

== Plot ==
28-year-old Emily Hall (Dedee Pfeiffer) is a bright and talented - but frustrated - novelist whose book constantly gets rejected by publishers. Her life goes into a tailspin when her boyfriend, Mike (Eric Close), breaks up with her; her best friend, Amber (Laura Leighton), suddenly packs up and moves to Mexico; and her psychic mother, Mona (Teri Garr), surprises her with the overwhelming news that her supposedly dead father is really an errant hippie photographer named Yogi (Howard Hesseman), who has just arrived in town and wants to meet her.

Unable to get a decent job, surrounded by the success of her friends and further depressed by the approach of her 10-year high school reunion, Emily must confront the reality that she has fallen far short of the lofty goals to which she originally aspired. Her world continues in its downward spiral as she finds herself crossing paths with an ever-increasing variety of unusually eccentric people ranging from a chain-smoking Santa Claus (Chris Elliott) to an obnoxious literary agent (Sean Astin).

Faced with the problem-laden reality of her unsuccessful life, Emily lets her imagination take her down the road of wacky and ineffectual ways to kill herself. But, before she can find an acceptable form of suicide, (no pain, no gore, no guts allowed), Emily finds herself thrown into a volunteer job at a local hospital where, with her faithful dog Sam, she visits sick and terminally ill patients.

One such patient, the ever-negative Mr. Finch (Bert Remsen), seems to dislike Emily and Sam's constant intrusions into his solitary life. Still, with time and devotion, Emily helps Mr. Finch to see the beauty and value in the world around him. Their new-found relationship proves to be the turning point for Emily, and, with Mr. Finch's help and support, Emily's faith in her own talent is restored.

== Cast ==
- Dedee Pfeiffer as Emily Hall
- Teri Garr as Mona Hall
- Howard Hesseman as Yogi Cook
- Eric Close as Mike
- Laura Leighton as Amber Lee
- Sean Astin as Mr. Schwartz
- Chris Elliott as Santa Claus
- Bert Remsen as Mr. Finch
- Octavia Spencer as Nurse

== Production ==
The Sky Is Falling was filmed on location in multiple areas of Los Angeles, California in 1997.

It was produced at an estimated cost of $500,000 and was the first film for writer/director Florrie Laurence.

== Reception ==
The film was well-reviewed and premiered at the South by Southwest Film Festival in 1999.

Variety called the film "Intermittently engaging but suffering from a schematic, repetitive structure."
