= The Allnighter (film) =

1987 film by Tamar Simon Hoffs

- Theatrical release poster
- Directed by: Tamar Simon Hoffs
- Written by: Tamar Simon Hoffs; M.L. Kessler
- Produced by: James L. Stewart
- Starring: Susanna Hoffs; Dedee Pfeiffer; Joan Cusack; James Anthony Shanta; John Terlesky; Michael Ontkean
- Cinematography: Joseph D. Urbanczyk
- Edited by: Dan M. Rich
- Music by: Charles Bernstein
- Production company: Aurora Productions
- Distributed by: Universal Pictures
- Release date: May 1, 1987
- Running time: 95 minutes
- Country: United States
- Language: English
- Budget: approx $1 million
- Box office: $2.7 million

The Allnighter is a 1987 American comedy film directed by Tamar Simon Hoffs and starring Susanna Hoffs, Dedee Pfeiffer, Joan Cusack and Pam Grier. It was released on May 1, 1987.

== Plot ==
Molly (Hoffs), Val (Pfeiffer) and Gina (Cusack) are graduating college, but on their final night, frustrations are aired. Molly is still looking for real love and Val is beginning to doubt if that is what she has found. Gina is too busy videotaping everything to really notice. When the final party at Pacifica College kicks off, things do not go exactly as planned.

== Cast ==
- Susanna Hoffs – Molly
- Dedee Pfeiffer – Val
- Joan Cusack – Gina
- James Anthony Shanta – Killer
- John Terlesky – C.J.
- Michael Ontkean – Mickey
- Pam Grier – Sergeant McLeesh
- Christian Roerig – Dirk Roburn
- Doug Choo – Uncle Vance

== Production ==
The film was also known as Cutting Loose.

It was written and directed by Hoffs' mother who had directed a number of music videos, including the Bangles' Going Down to Liverpool, and two short films, including The Haircut with John Cassavetes. She said:

Movies are never 100% accurate because they're one step away from reality, but I think this is an accurate depiction of young people-and not just kids in Southern California in 1987. I went to Yale and the experiences depicted in the film are very much like experiences I had at school. In fact, the three female leads are loosely based on myself and my two roommates. There are certain stories you can tell over and over and it's possible to have enormous amounts of content buried in a film like this. Being in school delays having to deal with certain aspects of life and these kids are still a bit innocent, so on one level the film is about the end of innocence. It's also about the relationships that develop between people when they live together at a certain point in their lives.

Tamar Hoffs called the film as "sort of a beach party movie intended for kids from 14 to 16... I've always loved beach party movies", she admits, "because they're optimistic and ask nothing more of the viewer than the price of admission and just hanging out-and that's pretty much the mood of `The Allnighter.' It's a light, easy film about a moment in time when friendship really counts."

Tamar Hoffs said she did not write the film with her daughter in mind.

Susanna Hoffs does not sing in the film, and no Bangles music is featured. She said:

This movie isn't a musical, and it would've confused the audience if I'd sung in the film-particularly since that's not what the character I portray is about. I play a vulnerable, cautious, self-protective girl-adjectives that describe me pretty well, by the way. I identified with this character quite a bit. On the other hand, she's a beach girl and that's something quite foreign to me. Even though I grew up at the beach and love it there, I can remember looking at surfers and surf bunnies and thinking 'Wow! Who are these people?! They're so cool they're like creatures from another planet!'

== Release ==
The film was promoted with a poster featuring Susanna Hoffs wearing a skimpy bikini as she sips a cocktail and the tag line, "Who says you can't do it all in one night?"

"I feel pretty weird about it", said Hoffs, "though there's a side of me that thinks it's kind of funny. I do a scene in the film wearing nothing but my underwear and I must admit that was hard to do. I knew if I had an incredible song blasting in the background I'd be able to do it, so I brought in a copy of Aretha's 'Respect' and that did the trick."

She added, "I'm satisfied with my performance in the long run… It left me eager to do more – probably because we all had so much fun. There was great camaraderie among the cast and I don't think anyone felt I was given special treatment because I was the director's daughter."

== Reception ==
The film was popularly and critically panned. On the review aggregator website Rotten Tomatoes, 0% of 9 critics' reviews are positive.

The film, according to motion picture-historian Leonard Maltin, was "grotesque in the AIDS era, although it would be a stinker in any age."

The New York Times called it "outstandingly dim. ... The principals are three bubble-headed women who room together, and the film could be accused of sexism if their male counterparts were not equally dumb."

The Hoffs said they planned to make another film together despite The Allnighter's poor reception. "The critics can't ruin our relationship", said Tamar. However, no subsequent film resulted.

Susanna Hoffs later said, "It was such a low budget quickie thing, a cutesy little teeny-bopper movie. It wasn't a great movie but the whole experience of it was great."

== Home media ==
On August 24, 1999, Universal Studios Home Entertainment released The Allnighter on DVD. Kino Lorber Studio Classics released the film for the first time on Blu-ray on February 23, 2021. Special features include audio commentary by Susanna Hoffs and Director Tamar Simon Hoffs, music video of Price-Sulton “No T.V. No Phone” and theatrical trailer.

== See also ==
- List of American films of 1987
