= Tamar Simon Hoffs =

American filmmaker (born 1934)

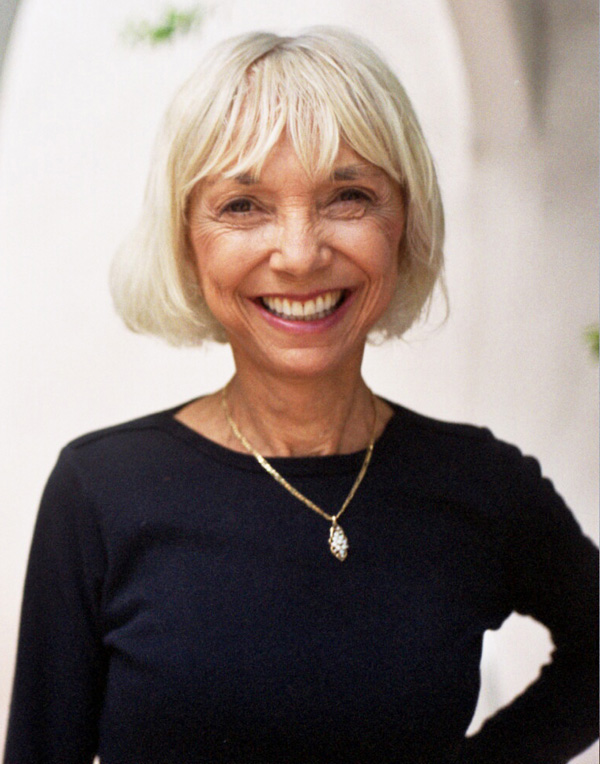
- Hoffs in 2009
- Born: Tamar Ruth Simon; October 23, 1934 (age 91); Johnstown, Pennsylvania, U.S.
- Occupations: Director; producer; screenwriter
- Spouse: Joshua Hoffs
- Children: John; Susanna; Jesse
- Parent(s): Ralph Simon and Kelsey Hoffer

Tamar Simon Hoffs (née Tamar Ruth Simon; October 23, 1934) is an American filmmaker, best known for directing the indie films Red Roses and Petrol (2003) and Pound of Flesh (2009), both starring Malcolm McDowell. She is the mother of Susanna Hoffs of The Bangles.

== Life and career ==
Hoffs was born in Johnstown, Pennsylvania, the youngest child to a Jewish family. Her parents were Kelsey Hoffer and Rabbi Ralph Simon, and she had a brother, Matthew. She grew up in Chicago and received a BA from the University of Chicago, followed by Graduate Studies at Yale University School of Fine Arts and the Illinois Institute of Technology, Institute of Design.

After moving to Los Angeles, Hoffs entered the filmmaking profession almost by accident, when actor friend Leonard Nimoy asked her to join the art department of his indie film, Deathwatch. In 1974, she co-wrote Warner Brothers' Lepke, starring Tony Curtis. Hoffs later wrote and produced Stony Island, with Andrew Davis, an independent film about young R&B musicians in inner city Chicago. It screened at Sundance Film Festival, Deauville American Film Festival and at the Chicago International Film Festival, where it won the coveted Lincoln Award and commendation from Illinois Governor James R. Thompson.

In 1980, Hoffs was chosen to participate in the prestigious AFI Directing Workshop for Women. Her directorial debut was the short comedy, The Haircut (Universal Studios, 1983), starring John Cassavetes, an official selection of the 1983 Cannes Film Festival, (Un Certain Regard), Toronto International Film Festival, Telluride Film Festival and Sundance Film Festival, and receiving a commendation from Robert Redford, Sundance Institute.

In 1987, Hoffs became the first woman to receive the triple director/writer/producer credit on a major studio feature film, The Allnighter (Universal Studios). In 1994, she was awarded Doctor of Humane Letters from International University College, Aix-en-Provence in International Education and European Studies.

In 1989 Hoffs wrote, produced and directed the youth musical Rock n' Read, starring Pauly Shore (MCA- Universal Studios), and Smokin': Somebody Stop Me (Library Video Company / Schlessinger Media, 1999), a series about the dangers of tobacco use. She served as producer, writer, and voice director on the digital animation series, Horrible Histories, (Scholastic Corporation, 2001), narrated by Stephen Rea.

In 2003 Hoffs wrote, directed and produced Red Roses and Petrol, a feature based on the stage play of the same name by Joseph O'Connor, starring Malcolm McDowell and Max Beesley. Her next feature, Pound of Flesh, starring Malcolm McDowell and Angus Macfadyen, was released in 2010.

Hoffs has also directed and produced numerous music videos, notably The Bangles' "Going Down to Liverpool" and "If She Knew What She Wants" (Columbia Records, 1984). On the stage, Hoffs directed the play Ghost Music, starring Pam Grier and Nick Cassavetes (Beyond Baroque Theater, 1984).

Hoffs is a member of the Directors Guild of America, the Writers Guild of America West, and the Alliance of Women Directors.

== Personal life ==
She was married to Joshua Allen Hoffs, M.D. for 67 years until his death in 2024, and has three children, John, Jesse, and Susanna Hoffs of The Bangles.

== Filmography ==
- Pound of Flesh (writer, director, producer), 2009
- Red Roses and Petrol (writer, director, producer), 2003
- Horrible Histories (TV series) (producer), 25 episodes, 2001–2002
- Rock & Read (writer, director, producer), 1989
- The Allnighter (writer, director), 1987
- The Bangles music video "If She Knew What She Wants" (producer), 1986
- Stand Alone (associate producer), 1985
- The Bangles music video "Going Down to Liverpool" (director), 1984
- The Haircut (writer, director), 1982
- Stony Island (writer, producer), 1978
- At Home with Shields and Yarnell (associate producer), 1978
- Lepke (writer), 1975
