= Dedee Pfeiffer =

American actress (born 1964)

- Born: Dorothy Diane Pfeiffer; January 1, 1964 (age 62); Midway City, California, U.S.
- Occupation: Actress
- Years active: 1985–present
- Spouse(s): Gregory Fein (m. 1996; div. 2001) Santiago A. Gomez (m. 2001; div. 2006) Kevin J. Ryan (m. 2009; div. 2012)
- Children: 2
- Family: Michelle Pfeiffer (sister)

Dorothy Diane "Dedee" Pfeiffer (born January 1, 1964) is an American actress. She began her career appearing in films including Vamp (1986), The Allnighter (1987) and The Horror Show (1989). Pfeiffer later starred as Cybill's daughter, Rachel, in the CBS sitcom Cybill (1995–1998) and as Sheri DeCarlo-Winston in the NBC/The WB sitcom For Your Love (1998–2002). In 2020, she began starring as Denise Brisbane in the ABC crime drama series, Big Sky.

== Early life ==
Pfeiffer was born on January 1, 1964, in Midway City, California, the daughter of Donna (née Taverna), a homemaker, and Richard Pfeiffer, a heating and air-conditioning contractor. She is the younger sister of actress Michelle Pfeiffer. She also has an older brother, Rick, and a younger sister, Lori.

== Career ==
Pfeiffer began her acting career at the age of 21 with a 1985 appearance on Simon & Simon. The same year, Pfeiffer made her film debut in Into the Night starring her sister, Michelle Pfeiffer. The following years, Pfeiffer had starring roles in a number of films, mostly critically panned, include Vamp (1986), The Allnighter (1987), and The Horror Show (1989). She had secondary roles in films Frankie and Johnny (1991) and Up Close & Personal (1996) starring her sister, and well as Falling Down (1993) and My Family (1995). From 1995 to 1997, she was regular cast member on the CBS sitcom Cybill playing Cybill Shepherd's daughter, Rachel Robbins Blanders. From 1998 to 2002, Pfeiffer starred in the NBC/The WB sitcom, For Your Love. Her other television credits include guest-starring roles on Hotel, Murder, She Wrote, Seinfeld, Wings, Ellen, and Friends. Pfeiffer posed nude for the February 2002 issue of Playboy magazine.

Apart from a couple of brief appearances, Pfeiffer took a long break from acting in 2010, almost ten years, battling alcohol addiction. During that time, she earned her master's degree in social work and worked in the field. In 2020, Pfeiffer returned to acting, playing the role of Denise Brisbane in the ABC crime drama series Big Sky, created by her brother-in-law David E. Kelley.

== Filmography ==
=== Film ===
Year	Title	Role	Notes
1985	Into the Night	Hooker	
1985	Moving Violations	Cissy	
1985	Toughlove	Kristen Marsh	TV movie
1985	The Midnight Hour	Mary Masterson	TV movie
1986	Dangerously Close	Nikki	
1986	Vamp	Allison/Amaretto	
1987	The Allnighter	Val	
1988	Brothers in Arms	Stevie	
1989	The Horror Show	Bonnie McCarthy	
1989	Red Surf	Rebecca	
1990	Tune in Tomorrow...	Nellie	
1991	A Climate for Killing	Donna	
1991	Providence	-	
1991	Drive	The Girl	
1991	Frankie and Johnny	Frankie's Cousin	
1992	Highway Heartbreaker	Emily	TV movie
1993	Falling Down	Sheila Folsom	
1993	Running Cool	Michele	
1993	King's Ransom	Catherine	Video
1993	The Sandman	Lana Hawkins	
1994	Double Exposure	Linda Mack	
1995	My Family	Karen Gillespie	
1995	Deadly Past	Kirsten	
1996	Up Close & Personal	Luanne Atwater	
1996	A Kiss So Deadly	Catherine Deese	TV movie
1999	The Sky Is Falling	Emily Hall	
2000	Meat Loaf: To Hell and Back	Leslie Edmonds	TV movie
2000	Radical Jack	Kate	Video
2004	Blue Demon	Marla Collins	Video
2004	A Killer Within	Sarah Moss	
2006	Hoboken Hollow	Rhonda Simmons	
2007	Seventeen and Missing	Emilie Janzen	TV movie
2007	The Prince and the Pauper: The Movie	Harlin	Video
2007	AVH: Alien vs. Hunter	Hilary	Video
2008	Fix	Daphne	
2008	Journey to the Center of the Earth	Emily Radford	Video
2009	Secret at Arrow Lake	Sarah Williams	
2010	Jack's Family Adventure	Emily Vickery	TV movie
2010	Flatline	Psychotherapist	
2011	L.A., I Hate You	The Casting Director	
2016	ShowRunner	Marilyn Brenner	Short

=== Television ===
Year	Title	Role	Notes
1985	Simon & Simon	Jennifer	Episode: "Slither"
1985	Code Name: Foxfire	Bonita	Episode: "La Paloma"
1986	CBS Schoolbreak Special	Queenie	Episode: "Have You Tried Talking to Patty?"
1986	Hotel	Angela Holly	Episode: "Child's Play"
1989	Midnight Caller	Sally Porter	Episode: "Baby Chase"
1990	Dream On	Mary	Episode: "And Sheep Are Nervous"
1993	Jack's Place	Allison	Episode: "Play It Again, Jack"
1993	Murder, She Wrote	Sally Brigs	Episode: "Murder in White"
1994	Seinfeld	Victoria	Episode: "The Opposite"
1994	Wings	Joan	Episode: "The Spark and How to Get It"
1995–97	Cybill	Rachel Robbins Manning	Recurring Cast: Season 1-4
1997	Ellen	Lisa	Episode: "Social Climber"
1998–2002	For Your Love	Sheri DeCarlo-Winston	Main Cast
1999	Hollywood Squares	Herself/Panelist	Recurring Guest
2002	Friends	Mary Ellen Jenkins	Episode: "The One with the Pediatrician"
2003	One on One	Colleen Bay	Episode: "I Hear White People"
2004	CSI: Crime Scene Investigation	Karen Brady	Episode: "Swap Meet"
2005	Wanted	Lucinda Rose	Recurring Cast
2005–06	The Dead Zone	Linda Finney	Guest Cast: Season 4-5
2006	CSI: NY	Grace Thomason	Episode: "Open and Shut"
2007	Burn Notice	Cara Stagner	Episode: "Fight or Flight"
2007	Without a Trace	Donna	Episode: "Claus and Effect"
2008	ER	Annie Raskin	Episode: "Haunted"
2009	Supernatural	Kate Milligan	Episode: "Jump the Shark"
2020–2023	Big Sky	Denise Brisbane	Main Cast

== Awards and nominations ==
Year	Awards	Category	Recipient	Outcome
1996	Screen Actors Guild Award	Screen Actors Guild Award for Outstanding Performance by an Ensemble in a Comedy Series	"Cybill"	Nominated
2009	Boston International Film Festival	Boston International Film Festival for Indie Soul Special Recognition Award	"Laredo"	Won
