= Yvonne Baby =

French journalist and novelist (1931–2022)

- Born: 18 August 1931; Le Touquet, France
- Died: 3 August 2022 (aged 90); Paris, France
- Occupations: Journalist, novelist

Yvonne Baby (18 August 1931 – 3 August 2022) was a French journalist, novelist, and critic.

== Life and career ==
Yvonne was the daughter of historian and political activist Jean Baby and Ruta Assia, and the stepdaughter of writer and film historian Georges Sadoul.

A journalist and writer, Baby directed the cultural service of the newspaper Le Monde from 1970 to 1985, after which she became a film critic. In 1975, she traveled to Copenhagen to interview Paul Pavlowitch on the mystery of Émile Ajar. She was vice-president of the jury of the 1983 Cannes Film Festival.

Yvonne Baby died on 3 August 2022, at the age of 90.

== Works ==
- Oui l'espoir (1967)
- Le Jour et la Nuit (1974)
- Kilroy (1980)
- La Vie retrouvée (1992)
- Ma mère et le ciel très vite (1998)
- Gris paradis (2003)
- La Femme du mur (2004)
- Quinze hommes splendides (2008)
- Le Troisième Ciel (2010)
- À l'encre bleu nuit (2014)
- Nirvanah (2016)
