= Le pendu =

1906 French silent short film

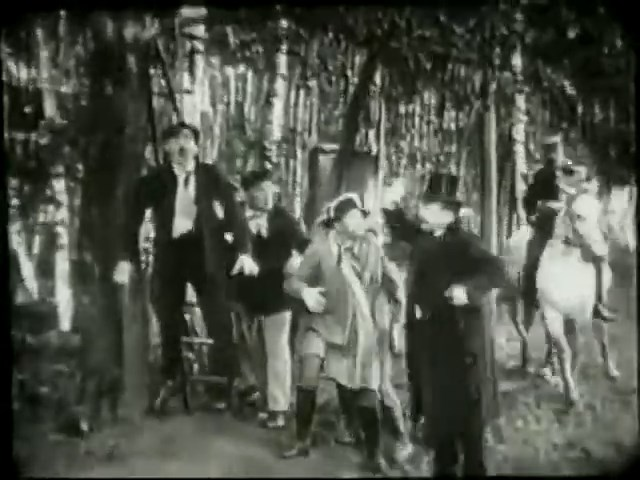
- Directed by: Louis J. Gasnier
- Starring: Max Linder
- Cinematography: Louis J. Gasnier
- Production company: Pathé Frères
- Distributed by: Pathé Company
- Release date: 1906
- Running time: 6 minutes
- Country: France

Le pendu is a French silent short film directed by Louis J. Gasnier and distributed in English-speaking countries under the titles The Man Who Hanged Himself and Attempted Suicide. The film was based on the eponymous song by Maurice Mac-Nab.

== Plot ==
Max comes courting a young lady with flowers; she likes him, but the parents send him away. The girl would not disobey her parents, so he leaves the flowers sadly on the doorstep. He goes into the forest and hangs himself. A young man digging for mushrooms finds him and gets a policeman, who comes and looks at the flailing man, then gets a sergeant, who refers the matter to his captain, who looks at the still-flailing man and goes to the village to get the police commissioner. He makes a speech to call villagers to help. Several follow him including a man with a ladder and finally the man is cut down. His sweetheart and her parents arrive on the scene; she throws herself on him to no effect, but a nearby cyclist manages to pump him back to life with his bicycle pump.

== Distribution ==
The film was released on 14 December 1906 at the Omnia-Pathé cinema in Paris, where the singer Anry Barat performed Maurice Mac-Nab's song "Le Pendu" which had inspired the film and which explained the action. The projectionist, who hand-cranked the projector, adapted the speed of the film to remain synchronous with the song.

The film was released in the US on 19 January 1907. A Variety reviewer "praised the brief scene, suggesting it to be most of all a "travesty" on French police."

== Analysis ==
The film is composed of 9 shots, all but the last one filmed on location, with continuity editing between shots and camera panning in shot 3:

1. A man and a woman are playing cards at a table in a garden in front of a house. Max comes in with a bunch of flowers and salutes the parents who ignore him. A young girl comes out of the house. He gives her the flowers but the parents forbid her to take them. Max leaves, desperate.

2. A forest. Max enters carrying a rope and hangs himself from a tree.

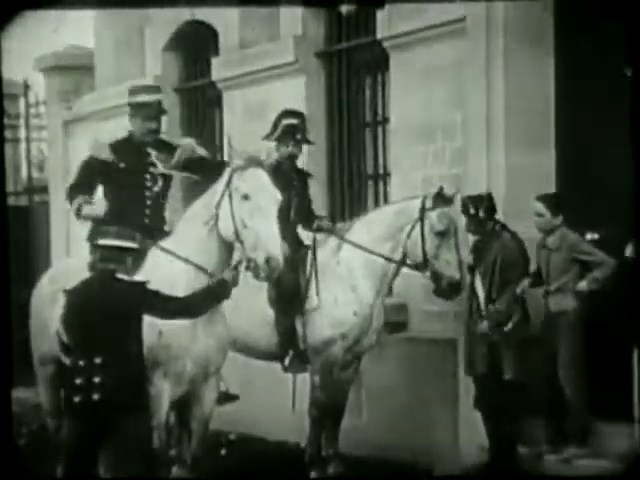
Shot 4

3. Other view of the forest. A young boy walks in, picking mushrooms. The camera pans right to follow him. He suddenly sees Max dangling from the tree and runs away. The camera pans right and we see the boy running back in with a gendarme. He wants to unhang the body but the gendarme prevents him and they both run away, exiting right.

4. The facade of an official building. The boy and the gendarme enter running in from the left. A gendarme enters on horseback and an officer mounts another horse. They all exit left.

5. Same as 3. The two riders, the gendarme and the boy enter running in, look at the man hanging from the tree, still feebly moving, and exit again.

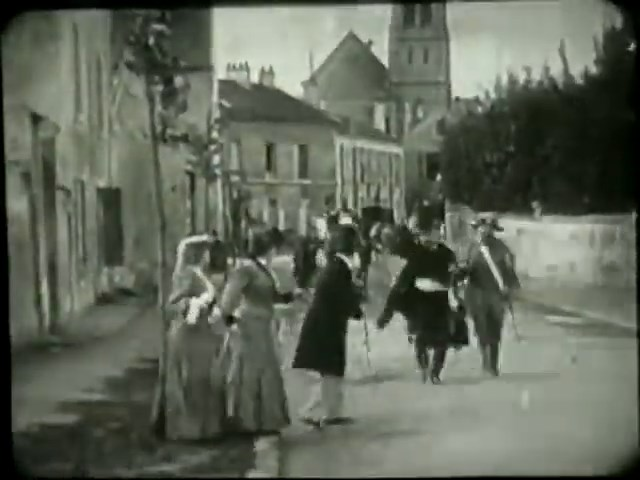
Shot 7

6. The facade of a police station. The two riders, the gendarme and the boy enter running in. The boy rings the bell and the police commissioner comes out. Having heard the story he comes back in before coming out again carefully tying up his official scarf. He makes a speech and several villagers enter, one of them carrying a ladder.

7. A village street. A group of villagers led by the commissioner and followed by the gendarmes runs past the camera and exit left.

8. Same as 3. The crowd comes in and after some discussions someone unhangs the man who by then no longer moves. He falls on the ground. The girl seen in 1 enters with her parents, she kneels by the body crying while a gendarme cuts the rope in pieces that he gives to the attendants as good luck charm. A cyclist enters and with his air pump he revives Max who embraces his beloved.

9. Close-up of a medallion with a four-leaf clover hanging from a rope.

This film has been quoted by several authors as an important early step in Max Linder's career, where "the comedic traits of the character of Max were becoming progressively more evident", and where his "soon-to-be-famous dapper but inept boulevardier persona began surfacing". On the other hand, Claudia Luna wrote that "despite the fact that Linder is the main protagonist, his acting, apart from the opening scene, is limited to swinging from a branch." She notes, however, that the film was a success but considers that this was rather due to the novelty of having the film presented with a synchronous song.

Richard Abel mentions Le pendu as example of one of Max Linder's films based on songs. The song was the 1890 eponymous song by Maurice Mac-Nab. He also notes that the film "uses sustained alteration to accentuate the comic process of Max's suicide attempt, as people notice him hanging but seek a higher authority to rescue him.

The very black humour of the film has been stressed by one author: "Max actually succeeds in the somber act, or at least very nearly so. For minutes hanging lifelessly beneath a branch with a shattered look on his face, he is finally rescued by police in the upmost nick of time. Unlike the later comic suicide attempts by Harold Lloyd in Haunted Spooks (1920) and Buster Keaton in Hard Luck (1921), the act is here performed nearly dead-serious, with zero gags to make up for it, and thus our distance to the execution remains arguably too slight for us to laugh at it."
