= The Romance of Max =

1912 film by Max Linder

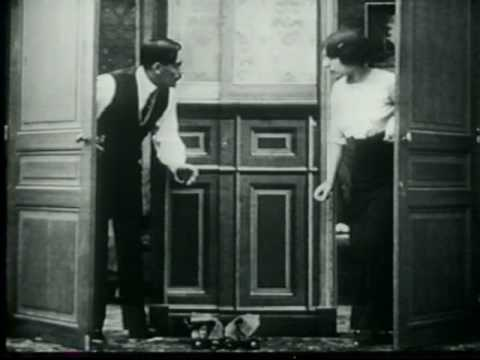
- French: Le Roman de Max
- Directed by: Max Linder
- Starring: Max Linder
- Production company: Pathé Frères
- Release date: 1912
- Running time: 3 minutes
- Country: France
- Language: Silent

The Romance of Max (French: Le Roman de Max) is a 1912 French short silent romantic comedy fantasy film directed by and starring Max Linder for Pathé Frères. The 6 minute, 8 second film was released on December 20, 1912. The plot may have been inspired by Emile Cohl's Matrimonial Shoes, (French: Les chaussures matrimoniales) from 1909, a shorter film with a similar storyline and animation.

== Plot ==
The Romance of Max (1912)

Vacationing at the seashore, Max reserves a room at the same time as a pretty woman (Lucy d'Orbel). The shoes are left in the corridor for polishing, and perform an animated dance of courtship while their owners are asleep. The next morning Max seeks inspiration among the rocks as the woman sits on a bench. Their shoes escape and run up a cliff and towards each other, meeting in front of a park bench. Even as the people sit at the bench their shoes again display an attraction towards one another. Eventually Max and the woman also consummate their relationship.
