= The Man in the Silk Hat =

1983 film

- Directed by: Maud Linder
- Written by: Maud Linder
- Produced by: Maud Linder
- Release date: 1983
- Running time: 93 minutes
- Country: France
- Language: French

The Man in the Silk Hat (French: L'homme au chapeau de soie) is a 1983 French documentary film about the films of the French silent film star Max Linder, directed by his daughter, Maud Linder. The film was screened out of competition at the 1983 Cannes Film Festival. A slightly longer version was presented in New York City in 1988, and released by Kino International.

== Cast ==
- Max Linder (archive footage)
- Maud Linder as Narrator (voice)
- Sarah Bernhardt (archive footage)
- Benoit Constant Coquelin (archive footage)
- Little Tich (archive footage)
