= Lili Rademakers =

Dutch film director

- Born: Alma Angenita Elizabeth Veenman; February 8, 1930; Utrecht, Netherlands
- Died: May 24, 2025 (aged 95); Rome, Italy
- Occupation: Film director

Alma Angenita Elizabeth (Lili) Rademakers-Veenman (8 February 1930 – 24 May 2025) was a Dutch film director.

== Career ==
Lili Veenman was the daughter of physician Ad Veenman and journalist Sylvia Brandts Buys. She began her career as an illustrator at the studios of Marten Toonder and, in the 1950s, studied filmmaking at the Institut des hautes études cinématographiques in Paris and the Centro sperimentale di cinematografia in Rome. She was the first Dutch woman to graduate from a film academy. In 1959, she worked as an assistant to director Federico Fellini on the film La Dolce Vita. In Italy, she met Fons Rademakers, whom she married in 1960 in Amsterdam.

Rademakers-Veenman mainly worked as an assistant to her husband. She contributed to films including Als twee druppels water (1963), Mira (1971), Max Havelaar (1976), and The Assault (1986). She also assisted Frans Weisz on Het gangstermeisje (1966) and Hugo Claus on Vrijdag (1981).

She directed two films of her own. Her debut as a director came in 1982 with the Belgian-Dutch co-production Menuet, based on a novella by author Louis Paul Boon. The screenplay was written by Rademakers and Hugo Claus. Her second and final film was released in 1987: Dagboek van een oude dwaas, based on the 1924 novel Chijin no Ai (The Love of a Fool) by Japanese author Jun'ichirō Tanizaki.

After Fons Rademakers completed his last film, The Rose Garden, in 1989, the couple lived alternately in France and Italy. After her husband's death in 2007, Lili Rademakers remained in Collevecchio, Italy, near his grave. She died on 24 May 2025 in a hospital in Rome at the age of 95.

== Alma's dochters ==
The book Alma's dochters by Jutta Chorus explores the lives of Lili Rademakers, her mother Sylvia Brandts Buys (1907–1994), her aunt Elly Brandts Buys (1913–1985), her grandmother Elly Berkhout (1882–1943), and her great-grandmother Alma Bimmermann (1853–1948). It is based on documents and letters discovered by Chorus in a suitcase in Rademakers' home.
