= Moussa Bathily =

Senegalese filmmaker, writer and teacher

- Born: 1946 (age 79–80); Bakel, Senegal
- Occupations: Film director, filmmaker, screen writer, novelist and history teacher
- Writing career
- Language: French, Soninke, Wolof
- Notable works: films Tiyabu Biru (Circumcision, 1978) and Le Certificat d'indigence (Poverty Certificate, 1981)

Moussa Bathily (also Moussa Yoro Bathily, born in 1946) is a Senegalese history teacher, journalist, film director and producer, screen writer, and novelist.

== Biography ==
Born in Bakel, East Senegal, as the Soninke son of a provincial governor, Bathily studied at a French colonial school and at the Dakar Lycée Van Vollenhoven (later named Lamine-Guèye). Starting in 1968, he read history at the Cheikh Anta Diop University at Dakar and graduated on a thesis on Blaise Diagne, who was in 1914 the first West African member elected to the French Chamber of Deputies. Bathily worked for three years as a history teacher in Rufisque, West Senegal, and wrote film reviews for the Dakar newspaper Le Soleil. Returning to Dakar he met filmmakers such as Djibril Diop Mambety and Mahama Johnson Traoré at the forerunner of the later Institut Français du Sénégal and started directing realist short films and documentaries, and later features.

== Novels ==
Bathily published two novels in French:

- Bathily, Moussa (1998). L'avenue des sables : roman [The sandy avenue] (in French). Châtenay-Malabry, France: Acoria: ACCT (Agence de coopération culturelle et technique), UNESCO. ISBN 9782912525208. OCLC 41269110.
- Bathily, Moussa (2021). Blaise Diagne : l'honorable député : roman [Blaise Diagne: the respectable delegate] (in French). Dakar, Senegal: L'Harmattan Sénégal. ISBN 9782343220741. OCLC 1259366220.

== Filmography ==
Bathily's films include:

Year	Film	Genre	Role	Duration (min)
1974	Centre International de Dakar	Documentary short	Director	21 m
1975	FIDAK (The International Fair of Dakar)	Documentary short	Director	20 m
1976	Des Personnages Encombrants (Obstructing characters)	Short fiction	Director	25 m
1976	N'dakaru. Impressions matinales (Dakar Morning Impressions)	Short	Director and producer	20 m
1977	Ceddo by Ousmane Sembène	Historical feature in French and Wolof	Assistant director	120 m
1978	Tiyabu Biru (Circumcision)	Drama feature in Soninke	Director	85 m
1980	Dakar, Capitale et Ville Carrefour (Dakar, capital and crossroad city)	Documentary short	Director	
1981	Siggy. La Poliomyelite	Docufiction on polio vaccination for the United Nations	Producer	40 m
1983	Le certificat d'indigence (Poverty Certificate)	Short	Director and screen writer	29 m
1983	Des Sites et Des Monuments au Sénégal (Sites and monuments in Senegal)	Documentary	Director	45 m
1987	Petits blancs au manioc et à la sauce gombos (White Beans with Cassava or Gombo Sauce)	Drama feature	Director and co-screen writer with Roger Grullemin	90 m
1993	Biliyaane / L'Archer Bassari, after a crime novel by Modibo Sounkalo Keita	Drama feature	Director and screen writer	90 m
2005	Atlantic Express	Drama feature	Director and producer	102 m
