= Maud Linder =

French journalist and documentarian (1924–2017)

Maud-Lydié Marcelle Leuvielle, better known as Maud Linder (27 June 1924 – 25 October 2017), was a French journalist, film historian and documentary film director.

== Life ==
Maud Linder was born in 1924 as the only daughter of silent film star Max Linder (legal name Gabriel Leuvielle) and his wife Hélène Peters. Her parents both committed suicide in October 1925.

Raised first by her paternal grandparents, and later by her maternal grandmother, at age 20 she saw one of her father's movies for the first time and decided to make his works accessible to the public again. In 1963, she compiled a film titled Laugh with Max Linder which premiered at the Venice Film Festival and also received the Étoile de Cristal. The film was a compilation of her father's last three films made in Hollywood. In 1983 Maud Linder made a documentary film titled The Man in the Silk Hat, about the life and career of her father. It was screened out of competition at the 1983 Cannes Film Festival. In 1992, Maud Linder published a book about Linder in France, Max Linder was my father and in 2008 she received the Prix Henri Langlois for her work to promote her father's legacy.

Linder also worked as a journalist and, in the 1950s and 1960s, as an assistant director, mostly for the filmmaker Jean-Paul Le Chanois.

Linder died on 25 October 2017 at the age of 93.

== Selected filmography ==
- 1954: Papa, maman, la bonne et moi (assistant director)
- 1954: Faites-moi confiance (assistant director)
- 1955: Papa, maman, ma femme et moi... (assistant director)
- 1961: Par-dessus le mur (assistant director)
- 1963: Laugh with Max Linder (En compagnie de Max Linder, director and producer)
- 1983: The Man in the Silk Hat (L'homme au chapeau de soie, director, screenwriter and producer)
- 2014: The Mystery of the King of Kinema (interview)

== Books ==
- Max Linder. In: Les Dieux du cinéma muet. Paris, 1992, Éditions Atlas
- Max Linder etait mon pere. Paris, 1992, Flammarion, ISBN 978-2080665768
