= The Haircut =

1982 film

- Directed by: Tamar Simon Hoffs
- Written by: Tamar Simon Hoffs
- Produced by: Elizabeth Gazzara
- Starring: John Cassavetes
- Edited by: Dan M. Rich
- Release date: 1982
- Running time: 22 minutes
- Country: United States
- Language: English

The Haircut is a 1982 American short comedy film directed by Tamar Simon Hoffs. It was screened in the Un Certain Regard section at the 1983 Cannes Film Festival.

== Cast ==
- John Cassavetes as Music Industry Executive
- Joyce Bulifant as Dell (Manicurist)
- Nicholas Colasanto as Bobby Russo (Barber)
- Meshach Taylor as Sam (Shoe Shine Man)
- Susanna Hoffs as Bobby Russo's Daughter (as The Bangs)
- Debbi Peterson as Bobby Russo's Daughter (as The Bangs)
- Victoria Peterson as Bobby Russo's Daughter (as The Bangs)
- Marji Mize as Bobby Russo's Daughter (as The Bangs)
- Robert Silvestro as Man in Towel
- Bob Russo as Real Barber
- Michael Barsimanto as Drummer
- Daniel Selby as Male Singer
