= Horrible Histories (2000 TV series) =

2000 American-Irish animated TV series

- Title card
- Genre: Comedy; Adventure
- Created by: Martha Atwater; Gordon Langley; Andrew Young; Charlie Stickney; Tamar Simon Hoffs
- Based on: Horrible Histories by: Terry Deary; Martin Brown
- Developed by: Martha Atwater; Gordon Langley; Andrew Young; Charlie Stickney; Tamar Simon Hoffs
- Written by: Martha Atwater; Terry Deary; Charlie Stickney; Andrew Young; Gordon Langley; William Forrest Cluverius
- Directed by: Andrew Young; Gordon Langley
- Voices of: Jess Harnell; Cree Summer; Billy West; Stephen Rea; Jo Young
- Theme music composer: Andrew Young; Gordon Langley; Charlie Stickney
- Opening theme: "Horrible Histories Theme"
- Ending theme: "Horrible Histories Theme"
- Composers: Dean Valentine; Rony Brack
- Countries of origin: United States; Ireland
- Original language: English
- No. of seasons: 1
- No. of episodes: 26

Production
- Executive producers: Deborah Forte; Mike Young; Paul Cummins
- Producers: Martha Atwater; Tamar Simon Hoffs; Michelle Conway
- Running time: 22 minutes
- Production companies: Scholastic Entertainment; Mike Young Productions; Telegael

Original release
- Network: ITV (CITV)
- Release: 19 December 2000 – 14 November 2001

Related
- Horrible Histories (2009 TV series)

Horrible Histories is an animated children's television series based on the Terry Deary book series of the same name. The series ran for 26 episodes that aired between 19 December 2000 and 14 November 2001.

== Synopsis ==
The series is based around the adventures of Stitch and Mo, two everyday kids who are transported to various historical eras with the help of a time portal. In each episode, their historical adventures help teach them a lesson or solve a problem in their everyday lives, often involving bully Darren Dongle. Animated sidebars explain the historical details, and clarify popular misconceptions.

== Characters ==
- Stitch (voiced by Billy West) is one of the two main protagonists, he has black glasses and usually wears a huge dark-green T-shirt that has a rat on it and covers the rest of his body. He is shown to be lazy and loves food (especially doughnuts), and also considers himself quite a comedian.
- Mo (voiced by Cree Summer in the original American version and Jo Young in the British dub) is one of the two main protagonists, she wears a white T-shirt with a flower on it and green camouflage jeans. She is the brains of the pair. Mo is also shown to love animals.
- Darren Dongle (voiced by Jess Harnell) is the main antagonist, a nerd who knows a lot about history but is shown to enjoy taunting Stitch and Mo. He is over-confident and hates it when he is wrong.
- The Narrator (voiced by Billy West in the original American version and by Stephen Rea in the British dub) transports Stitch and Mo through time to solve their situations and is shown to be a good joker. In Amazing Aussies, his name is revealed to be "Frank Synopsis."

== Production ==
Horrible Histories is based on Terry Deary's book series of the same name. Deary later said he had had a "terrible experience" with the show.

The show is produced by California-based indie Mike Young Productions (LA), Telegael Galway, and Scholastic Entertainment (NY). It marked Young's and Telegael's first collaboration. It is directed by Andrew Young (executive producer Mike Young's son) and Gordon Langley. It is produced by Martha Atwater, Tamar Simon Hoffs, Michelle Conway, Paul Cummings, Deborah Forte, Mike Young, Mark Young, Beth Richman and Charlie Stickney, among others. It is animated by Glenn Jason Hanna. It is written by Martha Atwater, Terry Deary, Charlie Stickney, Andrew Young, Gordon Langley, William Forrest Cluverius. It has a running time of 25 minutes.

On the British channel ITV, the show attracted hundreds of thousands of viewers each week. Stephen Rea did his voice recording work in Dublin.

In 2006, The Mirror held a promotion where readers had to collect 12 coupons and send them in to receive a free copy of the Horrible Histories DVD collection.

== Episodes ==
| No. | Title | Original release date |
|---|---|---|
| 1 | "Vicious Vikings" | 15 January 2001 |
Stitch, Mo, and Darren have the same report in history class: Vikings, and Darren thinks that he will beat Stitch and Mo. The narrator then zaps Stitch and Mo to Brattahilid, Greenland in 1000 where they meet Erik the Red, and his ignored son Leif Eriksson and learn about the true histories of the famed seamen.
| 2 | "Measly Middle Ages" | 19 December 2000 |
Mo ends up being grounded after she refuses to clean her room. So, the narrator zaps Stitch and Mo back in time to 1215 to see how dirty the serfs and British of Middle Age England are for Mo to learn her lesson.
| 3 | "Rotten Romans" | 19 December 2000 |
A student couldn't make it for the teacher conference, so Darren came to take his place. While he was making his speech, he was wearing red boots. Stitch and Mo wonder why, so the narrator zaps them to Ancient Rome, 44 BC where they meet Julius Caesar.
| 4 | "Angry Aztecs" | 16 January 2001 |
Stitch and Mo think they have found good luck. They are zapped back to 1520, Mexico during the Aztec period. They find out that the Aztecs were some of the most superstitious people in history.
| 5 | "Terrible Tudors" | 27 December 2000 |
Mo is about to lose her soccer team to Darren, much to her dismay. The narrator zaps Stitch and Mo back into the tudor times of England and Mo learns how to coach her soccer team by watching how Queen Elizabeth ruled her kingdom in 1588.
| 6 | "Groovy Greeks" | 15 January 2001 |
Stitch and Mo get into an argument after they're late for gym class. Darren challenges the two to the art of wrestling, making one of them face him. The narrator then zaps Stitch and Mo to Ancient Greece, 403 BC where wrestling was a popular sport in the Olympics.
| 7 | "Wild West" | 29 January 2001 |
Darren forces Stitch and Mo to go down a scary-looking snowboarding course. Stitch and Mo think they should just give up but the narrator zaps them to Frontier America in 1849 where they meet a blacksmith named Sam and learn that there's always an opportunity.
| 8 | "Revolting Revolution" | 12 February 2001 |
Darren is being unfair to everyone when he took his uncle's job as keeper of a paintball court, where he charges for everything. The narrator then zaps Stitch and Mo to the American Revolution of 1773 where they get separated and learn more from the two sides: the Americans and the British.
| 9 | "Royal Pain" | 14 March 2001 |
Stitch has to do his genealogy project for school. Stitch thinks that his relatives are royalty and wishes to be "King of Donuts" and build a magnificent donut castle. The narrator then zaps Stitch and Mo to see three of the world's most famous kings: Louis XIV who built the Palace of Versailles, Peter the Great who built St. Petersburg and Shah Jahan who built the Taj Mahal.
| 10 | "Ingenious Industrialists" | 23 February 2001 |
Stitch and Mo want their own jobs, so the narrator zaps them to the Industrial Revolution of 1840 where children are bound to have jobs.
| 11 | "Trading Timbuktu" | 10 March 2001 |
Mo trades her brand new comic book for a trashy, old one. She becomes upset by her trade, so the narrator zaps her and Stitch to the Mali Empire where common items were made their weight in gold. They also meet a man who wishes to be a magician.
| 12 | "Amazing Aussies" | 22 March 2001 |
Stitch and Mo are sent to detention after Mo put her cousin's lizard Slimeball into Darren's locker. The narrator then zaps Stitch and Mo to Australia when people were being taken as prisoners.
| 13 | "Savage Stone Age" | 25 April 2001 |
Darren calls Stitch and Mo neanderthals, which upsets them. The Narrator zaps them back to the stone age of 38000 BC, to show them what neanderthals were capable of doing.
| 14 | "Battlin' Bolivar" | 25 April 2001 |
Stitch and Mo fail at building a dung-powered donut-making machine for a science fair. The narrator zaps them to South America where they meet Simón Bolívar.
| 15 | "Marvelous Marco Polo" | 31 May 2001 |
The narrator zaps Stitch and Mo to Mongolia in 1292 where they meet Marco Polo.
| 16 | "Challenging China" | 31 May 2001 |
Stitch and Mo are terrified to find out that Darren Dongle is moving into Mo's neighborhood. Stitch thinks about building a wall so Darren doesn't annoy them. The narrator then zaps Stitch and Mo to Ancient China to learn about how The Great Wall Of China was built.
| 17 | "Awesome Egyptians" | 2 July 2001 |
Stitch and Mo have to find a way to defeat Darren and his snowball launcher in the simplest of ways. The narrator zaps Stitch and Mo to Ancient Egypt where they meet Tutankhamen. King Tut orders them to find a place for the party of the great flood.
| 18 | "Stormin' Scots" | 20 August 2001 |
The terrier mascot of Stitch and Mo's basketball team has disappeared, and the team is desperate without it. The narrator zaps Stitch and Mo to Scotland where they meet King Robert the Bruce.
| 19 | "Surprising Samurai" | 23 August 2001 |
Mo doesn't want to waste her time with the old fashioned way of her grandma Grannykins. Instead, she wants to play her new samurai video game. The narrator then zaps her and Stitch to Heian era Japan where they learn what being a samurai is like.
| 20 | "Gnarly North Pole" | 23 August 2001 |
Stitch and Mo are supposed to compete against Darren in an obstacle course. When Stitch and Mo think they're going to lose, the narrator zaps them to the Arctic Circle where they find Robert Edwin Peary, the first man ever to make it to the North Pole.
| 21 | "Rockin' Renaissance" | 31 August 2001 |
Stitch and Mo are searching for inspiration for an art show, so the narrator zaps them to the Renaissance where they meet Michelangelo.
| 22 | "Magnificent Mounties" | 24 October 2001 |
The narrator zaps Stitch and Mo to Canada where Stitch gets captured by a criminal and Mo teams up with the Royal Canadian Mounty Police to rescue him.
| 23 | "Perilous Plagues" | 26 October 2001 |
Stitch is afraid to get his shot, so he and Mo are zapped to Italy where the Bubonic Plague is spreading.
| 24 | "Extraordinary Explorers" | 26 October 2001 |
The narrator zaps Stitch and Mo to the Rocky Mountains where they meet Lewis and Clark.
| 25 | "Highly Hawaiian" | 14 November 2001 |
The narrator zaps Stitch and Mo to ancient Hawaii.
| 26 | "Captivating Columbus" | 14 November 2001 |
Darren Dongle is the substitute teacher and challenges Stitch and Mo to a true-or-false quiz about Christopher Columbus. Zapping Stitch and Mo back in time won't help them, so they're on their own.

== DVD release ==
The DVD cover of the episode pack "Groovy Greeks", "Extraordinary Explorers" and Battlin' Bolivar".

The show's episodes have been released as single episodes, as 3-in-1 packs, or as one whole series. The series was released as a 3-disc DVD box set in 2005.
