= Minuet (film) =

1982 film

Menuet
- Theatrical release poster
- Directed by: Lili Rademakers
- Written by: Hugo Claus, Louis Paul Boon (novel)
- Release date: 2 September 1982
- Running time: 86 minutes
- Countries: Belgium; Netherlands
- Language: Dutch

Menuet is a 1982 Belgian-Dutch drama film directed by Lili Rademakers. The film was selected as the Belgian entry for the Best Foreign Language Film at the 55th Academy Awards, but was not accepted as a nominee.

== See also ==
- List of submissions to the 55th Academy Awards for Best Foreign Language Film
- List of Belgian submissions for the Academy Award for Best Foreign Language Film
