= The Battle (1923 film) =

1923 film

The Battle La Bataille
- Directed by: Sessue Hayakawa; Édouard-Émile Violet
- Written by: Claude Farrère (novel); Margaret Turnbull
- Starring: Sessue Hayakawa; Tsuru Aoki; Félix Ford; Gina Palerme
- Cinematography: Georges Asselin; Louis Dubois; Daniel Quintin
- Production company: Le Film d'Art
- Release date: 28 December 1923 (France)

The Battle (French: La Bataille) is a 1923 French film directed by Sessue Hayakawa and Édouard-Émile Violet. Hayakawa and his wife Tsuru Aoki played lead roles in the film.
