= List of The Tower of Druaga episodes =

This is a complete episode listing of the anime television series The Tower of Druaga: the Aegis of Uruk (Japanese: ドルアーガの塔 〜the Aegis of URUK〜, Hepburn: Druaga no Tō ~the Aegis of URUK~) and its sequel The Tower of Druaga: the Sword of Uruk (ドルアーガの塔 〜the Sword of URUK〜, Druaga no Tō ~the Sword of URUK~), created by Gonzo. The Aegis of Uruk premiered on Japanese television, and across various websites including YouTube on April 1, 2008. The Sword of Uruk followed on Japanese television and, again, across various websites on January 8, 2009.

== Aegis of Uruk ==
The first season of The Tower of Druaga began airing on April 1, 2008, and concluded on June 20. It consists of twelve episodes and follows the journey of Jil, Kaaya, Neeba, and other adventurers climbing the mysterious Tower of Druaga. The opening theme, Swinging is performed by Muramasa☆ and the ending theme, Tōchōsha-tachi (塔頂者たち) is performed by Kenn, the voice of Jil.

No.	Title	Original release date	English airdate
1	"The Great Tower of Druaga (Inner)"; Transliteration: "Doruāga no Kyotō" (Japanese: ドルアーガの巨塔)	April 1, 2008	December 8, 2010
The legendary Tower of Druaga is mysteriously resurrected eighty years after having been previously taken down. In order to destroy the evil deity Druaga, the Kingdom of Uruk dispatches its troops to the tower, but the expedition repeatedly fails in its efforts. A young man named Jil, awarded with a set of brilliant golden armor and a sword as tokens, confidently makes his way to confront the evil deity inhabiting the tower. Jil is knocked out while trying to attack the Kusarakks head on. He subsequently dreams of conquering the tower through a lot of comical situations. However, Jil wakes up to the harsh reality that he was sleeping, as he was the first to be knocked out and lose his equipment.
2	"Meskia, City in the Tower"; Transliteration: "Tōnai Toshi Mesukia" (Japanese: 塔内都市メスキア)	April 11, 2008	December 10, 2010
Because of a blunder during his first battle, Neeba is forced to fire Jil from the group. Though disheartened by the humiliating dismissal, his desire to conquer the evil deity does not wane. Jil wanders the city of Meskia, which is filled with anticipation for the third season of expedition to the tower. After causing a riot in the marketplace, he meets a mysterious girl named Kaaya, who heals his unnoticed injuries. A reserved young woman called Ahmey, who had helped carry Jil inside to get treated, joins the group as she also has an interest in climbing the tower. When Jil learns of the visit of the great hero Gilgamesh to the city, he takes his new friends to watch the procession. While there, he overhears that Neeba and his party plan to invade the state guesthouse through the sewers at night. After Kaaya and Ahmey take out an unknown group of assailants Jil goes inside the state guesthouse, only to find Gilgamesh assassinated.
3	"Before We Depart"; Transliteration: "Tabidachi no Mae ni" (Japanese: 旅立ちの前に)	April 18, 2008	December 13, 2010
Jil barely escapes from the scene of the king's assassination thanks to the quick-wit of Neeba. The next day, the review of troops by the king goes on as scheduled. At the ceremony, Jil is dumbstruck, because before him is none other than Gilgamesh, who he saw murdered the night before. Neeba is aware that Pazuzu was behind the assassination plot. Meanwhile, in the city of Meskia, a giant slime monster suddenly falls from the sky and causes havoc. A young girl named Coopa is enveloped by the slime but is quickly rescued by Ahmey. When Coopa learns that Jil and the others are climbers, she insists on them allowing herself and her mage master Melt to join their party. Though they are mistakenly arrested for treason, Kaaya convinces the king to release Jil and company from prison.
4	"Band of Hands"; Transliteration: "Bando obu Hando" (Japanese: バンド･オブ･ハンド)	April 25, 2008	December 14, 2010
Jil and his party set out on their expedition, among other climbers, and face their first battle against a horde of spider demons. However, their struggle against the demons is harder than expected because of their unrefined teamwork. Ahmey, as the only climber with notable experience, becomes the de facto leader of the group, and she must guide them in regards to battle strategies and numerous rules of thumb about climbing. At night, a pack of Kusarakks gradually approach them, but, equipped with the necessary knowledge and skills, they regroup to confront and defeat the Kusarakks.
5	"Ziusudra's Trap"; Transliteration: "Jiusudora no Wana" (Japanese: ジウスドラの罠)	May 2, 2008	December 15, 2010
On their journey, Jil and the others pass a signboard indicating a shortcut, but this shortcut turns out to be a series of different traps that hinder their efforts to go forward. One of the traps causes their gender to switch, the other forces them to wear animal costumes, and some render them into early video game graphics. They subsequently arrive at the final gate, but getting through the door turns out to be harder they imagine. Jil, seeing that all his friends fail to impress the gate with parlor tricks, does an amusing dance taught by his father, but not even this would let them pass since it was somehow performed by someone else before him. The group unfortunately must take the long way up the tower.
6	"The Lightning Bridge"; Transliteration: "Raikō no Kakehashi" (Japanese: 雷光の架け橋)	May 9, 2008	December 16, 2010
Jil and his party encounter another party that has practically been wiped out in a fierce battle against the ogres. There they manage to rescue an aged warrior called Geeze, who was an acclaimed guardian of the past, and they stop at a camping area on the way. However, they are unable to take a moment of rest as they are plagued by one problem after another. One of the party members has a wallet pick-pocketed by a boy named Yury, while a heated argument erupts between Coopa and Melt. In the end, reconciliation seems out of the question as Coopa, disgusted by her petulant master, decides to leave the party to be on her own. Coopa decides to accompany Yury to find his father, said to have stolen the sacred spear of the village. As the two are attacked by ogres, Jil and company manage to intervene and find the sacred but broken spear left behind by Yury's deceased father.
7	"Dance with the One-Winger"; Transliteration: "Katahane to Odore" (Japanese: 片羽と踊れ)	May 16, 2008	December 17, 2010
The Uruk Army, led by General Kelb, is unable to move forward as a single-winged dragon suddenly appears before them. Inside the tower, there is an unprecedented militant atmosphere as the anger of the army reaches a crescendo at the total annihilation of the scout regiment by the dragon. Jil gathers many warriors in preparation for the upcoming battle against the dragon. He even tries to persuade Neeba that the climbers need to work closely with the army to defeat this dragon. With the necessary teamwork, the dragon falls to its death, and Jil is recognized for his brave act of courage.
8	"The Legendary Tower"; Transliteration: "Densetsu no Tō" (Japanese: 伝説の塔)	May 23, 2008	December 20, 2010
Kaaya collapses out of the blue and informs the party she has a deadly illness. However, the entire party is puzzled by the illness and the fact that Kaaya suddenly changes its name by mistake. Jil, in his naïveté, sets out to search for the cause of this mysterious ailment. They finally arrive where the answer supposedly lies, but the place turns out to be nothing like any other floor in the tower they have visited so far, resembling that of an arcade game. As Jill seeks the stone tablet for Kaaya's cure, none of the characters notice that Kaaya has suspiciously regained her health, and the reason for Kaaya's ruse remains unclear. When Jil acquires the stone tablet, Ki appears and heals him, warning that he will be faced with three betrayals during the course of his quest.
9	"11:09"; Transliteration: "Irebun Nain" (Japanese: イレブンナイン)	May 30, 2008	December 21, 2010
Jil and his party enter an area supported only by thin pillars, engaging in a battle against balloon-shaped monsters, and, demonstrating well-coordinated teamwork, they defeat the enemy in the end. The festive mood from the victory, however, is short-lived, as the feebly structured area collapses due to the explosion caused by the demise of the monsters. The collapse of the area also extends to other areas on the same floor, thus causing Neeba's party and the Uruk Army much chaos. Members of all parties find themselves separated from each other. As they all cross many dangerous obstacles, each group develops close relationships and begin to understand the views of each other. As they all reunite at a rundown area to rejoin their respective parties, Fatina finds out that Kally was killed by Pazuzu.
10	"At Summer's End"; Transliteration: "Natsu no Owari ni" (Japanese: 夏の終わりに)	June 6, 2008	December 22, 2010
All the groups travel through a blizzard to reach the Shrine of Diamond. The ultimate goal for everyone is to make it to the top floor of the tower, the Shrine of Sky. Jil, Neeba, Kelb, and Pazuzu's respective parties go their separate ways in order to do this. Neeba is warned by the Succubus that the third season of expedition will soon end and Druaga will soon awaken. As each and every group continue their quests, all the climbers' dreams, objectives and ambitions are intermingled and eventually develop into a fierce battle, marking another chapter in the history of the Tower of Druaga. Jil risks his life to save Neeba from Pazuzu, but is met with harsh criticism rather than gratitude from his brother. Kaaya begins to show doubt in Jil's ability to fulfil his promise to her to reach the top of the tower.
11	"As But a Single Shield"; Transliteration: "Tada Ichi Mai no Tate to Shite" (Japanese: ただ一枚の盾として)	June 13, 2008	December 23, 2010
The evil deity Druaga finally appears in its gigantic form. Neeba and his party bravely face off against it, but the demon god's power is so overwhelming that the party soon begins to lose ground. Seeing that they are cornered, Jil tries to rush to their rescue, only to be stopped by Kaaya, who maintains that they should continue to make their way toward the top floor of the tower. Jil shakes free from her grasp and dashes off toward Druaga, and the climbers are forced to undertake a daring strategy to defeat the demonic deity. Meanwhile, Neeba, separated from his party, faces off against Pazuzu. As the other climbers put in their efforts to fight against Druaga, Ahmey attempts to strike its head, but at the cost of her own life.
12	"You Zapped To..."	June 20, 2008	December 24, 2010
In order to defeat Druaga, Jil devises a strategy with the surviving climbers to seclude the demon in a small area at the top of the tower to gain an advantage, volunteering himself as a decoy to fulfill his calling as a guardian. Kaaya, seeing Jil risking his life for the sake of the mission, apologizes for things she cannot reveal. The group manages to successfully defeat Druaga with the use of the staff that Ahmey left behind after her death, but as Jil goes to claim the blue crystal rod, Neeba turns on him. He reveals that the monster they killed was not Druaga and the rod is actually a key to the second half of the tower. Kaaya unexpectedly joins Neeba and they both ascend the tower as the floor suddenly floods with water. Jil emerges from the water with Fatina in his arms in a lake near Meskia, while Pazuzu's mysterious coffins open and beings emerge from within.

== Sword of Uruk ==
The second season of The Tower of Druaga premiered on January 8, 2009, and ran for twelve episodes. Six months after the events of the first season, Jil, Fatina, and the surviving Climbers have settled in Meskia after the defeat of Druaga and the betrayals of Kaaya and Neeba. However, when a mysterious young girl appears, Jil and his companions must climb the Tower once more. The opening theme for the second season is "Questions?" by Yu Nakamura and the ending theme for episodes 01(13) to 11(23), "Mahōtsukai Desu Kedo" (魔法使いですけど.) is performed by Fumiko Orikasa, the voice of Kaaya. The ending theme for 12(24) is "Swinging" by Muramasa☆.

No. overall	No. in season	Title	Original release date	English airdate
1	13	"The Tower of Gilgamesh"; Transliteration: "Girugamesu no Tō" (Japanese: ギルガメスの塔)	January 8, 2009	December 27, 2010
Six months have passed since the defeat of Druaga, and the tower is renamed by Gilgamesh, who falsely claims all credit for the act. The veteran climbers have moved on with their lives, with Fatina becoming a tour guide, Kelb running a tavern, and Utu becoming a wrestler. However, Jil is still burdened with the betrayals of Neeba and Kaaya. In an effort to cheer him up, Fatina invites him out to see a play and then to see a wrestling match, only for the pair to run into trouble when a mysterious little girl comes to them after being chased by the Golden Knights, led by Uragon. With Utu's help, Jil and Fatina escape with the girl, who reveals herself to be Ki, the first priestess of Ishtar and queen to Gilgamesh. She demands that Jil take her to the top of the tower, lest Kaaya will suffer a terrible fate.
2	14	"Meskia, Capital City"; Transliteration: "Ōto Mesukia" (Japanese: 王都メスキア)	January 15, 2009	December 28, 2010
After taking shelter at Kelb's place, Jil agrees to take Ki up the tower in order to learn Neeba and Kaaya's fate. Fatina is opposed to the idea and refuses to join Jil, feeling that he would only need her skills as a mage, much like how Neeba used her. After Kelb tries to learn more about how the child-like Ki could be Gilgamesh's queen, Jil and Utu set off to ascend the tower with Ki, recruiting Henaro as well. However, Uragon stops them from taking the dingle ladder, the newest form of transportation up the tower, until Fatina arrives to aid them. The group is able to enter the transport thanks to Ethana allowing the gate to remain unlocked. Jil thanks Fatina for joining them, but she asks that he must give up if he finds nothing at the top of the tower and that he also must protect her.
3	15	"Meltland, City of Dreams"; Transliteration: "Yume no Machi Merutorando" (Japanese: 夢の町メルトランド)	January 22, 2009	December 29, 2010
Jil's party quickly ascends to the higher levels of the tower and are reunited with Melt and Coopa, who now run a lucrative resort in a frigid area. When Jil asks for their help, Melt reveals that he has already made a deal with Uragon to capture Ki while everyone else is imprisoned. When Uragon accidentally steps on one of Melt's employed Ropers, the ensuing chaos allows everyone to escape, though Melt is financially ruined. Jil and his group continue up the tower while Melt and Coopa are forced to go with Uragon.
4	16	"Into the Phantasm"; Transliteration: "Gen'ei no Naka e" (Japanese: 幻影の中へ)	January 29, 2009	December 30, 2010
Upon reaching the top of the tower, a weakened Druaga attacks Jil and his party. However, when Jil is hit by its laser beam, he loses consciousness and awakens in a world where Ki begins to explain her history. Both Ki and Kaaya had been tasked to assist him to the top of the tower six months ago, but neither of them had the desire to do so. She also reveals that Gilgamesh had been cursed with immortality by Druaga eighty years ago, existing as two entities; one in Meskia and another at the top of the Tower of Fantasy. To prevent him from becoming a tyrant, Kaaya and Neeba seek to kill the king, but must kill the entity at the top of the tower to do so. When Jil regains consciousness just as Druaga is defeated and obtains the key to the second half of the tower, Henaro and Ki are taken hostage by Gremica, who heads up the tower with her party. Jil, Fatina, and Utu later advance as well, knowing that there is no return from this point on, but they are unaware that Melt, Coopa, and Uragon are still following them.
5	17	"The Land of Shadows"; Transliteration: "Kage no Kuni" (Japanese: 影の国)	February 5, 2009	December 31, 2010
Jil, Fatina, and Utu continue to pursue Gremica, but wind up in a barren landscape, where they find Henaro. However, the field is filled with monsters and the only safety is in the shadows. When Gremica forces Ki to cast a spell revealing Neeba's footprints, Jil's party is able to find them and make their way out. However, without any shadows near the exit, they are unable to leave until they topple a pillar, and Melt uses his magic to create a dust cloud to block out enough light to destroy any attacking monsters. Meanwhile, in Meskia, Gilgamesh struggles with his erratic behavior and tries to kill himself, only to be stopped by a phantom of his other self. He wishes that Ki would save him.
6	18	"The Four Assassins"; Transliteration: "Yottsu no Shikaku" (Japanese: 四つの刺客)	February 12, 2009	January 3, 2011
Neeba and Kaaya make their way across a vast expanse of water, unaware that the coffin knights are watching them, and realize the instability of the area reflects Gilgamesh's own heart. The duo are eventually attacked by Sword of Blood and Tear of Ice, two of the four soulless artificial soldiers released from the coffins owned by Pazuzu, but manage to escape to the next floor through a whirlpool. Both Jil and Gremica's parties make their way through a jungle, and everyone is separated when Mite the Fool and Specula Ex Machina suddenly attack them. When Acra knocks out Mite the Fool, Gremica's party is able to flee while Jil's party is left to finish off Specula Ex Machina before they move on to the next area. Uragon's party finds an unconscious Mite the Fool before they advance as well. Kelb and Ethana separately witness Gilgamesh's increasingly cruel behavior as he plans to invade neighboring countries.
7	19	"The Mansion of Eternal Spring"; Transliteration: "Tokoharu no Yakata" (Japanese: 常春の館)	February 19, 2009	January 4, 2011
Near a mansion in a green field, Jil's party finds Melt and Coopa and are inexplicably reunited with the deceased Ahmey and Kally. Everyone, minus Uragon, ends up finding someone who has died or something that was lost that they wanted to see again. Henaro is shocked when Pazuzu not only reveals that the coffin knights had gone berserk following his death, but also admits to not having any sympathy for her, causing her to shoot him in the head. Utu locates the key to a locked portal required to escape but hesitates to say anything until the three remaining coffin knights appear and attack the mansion. Mite the Fool awakens, recognizing Kally as her father, who fades away after asking her to protect everyone, which causes her to attack her comrades. She ends up tagging along with Uragon afterwards. Ahmey gives Jil the headband Kaaya left behind to remind him as his resolve before she vanishes, and he passes through the portal with his group.
8	20	"Once, They..."; Transliteration: "Futari wa Katsute" (Japanese: 二人はかつて)	February 26, 2009	January 5, 2011
Upon arriving in a cavern and colliding with Specula Ex Machina, Jil is forced to act as a decoy to allow his friends to get away. However, Jil runs into Neeba, disagreeing with his motivations of wanting to revive the Sumar Empire. Jil's companions find an ill Kaaya, but as Fatina and Utu unsuccessfully try to wake her, Henaro sneaks off to contact Sword of Blood and Tear of Ice. As Jill sets off to fight Specula Ex Machina, Gremica and Acra appear to expose the presence of the Succubus, who claims that Neeba has been following her will rather than trying to revive the Sumar Empire. While fighting against Gremica, Neeba pierces Acra in the chest. Neeba then helps Jil destroy Specula Ex Machina. It is explained that Neeba was once trained under Gremica after his father had been killed. Ethana, after receiving a secret letter from Kelb, heads out to lead an uprising.
9	21	"At the Dream's End"; Transliteration: "Yume No Owari ni" (Japanese: 夢のおわりに)	March 5, 2009	January 6, 2011
Henaro is discovered to be a spy working for Amina, sent on a mission to retrieve the four coffin knights. Jil, Fatina, Utu, and Melt are knocked out after battling against Sword of Blood and Tear of Ice, finding out what happened afterward. A wounded Coopa and an awakened Kaaya are captured by Henaro and are taken to the Tower of Fantasy, where the shadow of Gilgamesh has them caged. Neeba and Succubus, with a chained Ki in tow, follow them through doorway to the top floor. Ethana starts a riot in the city of Meskia. Jil, Gremica, Uragon and their respective companions meet to figure out their situation, and they confirm their purpose for climbing the tower. After an overwhelmed Gilgamesh, controlled by his shadow, murders Amina for going behind his back, the Tower of Fantasy begins to undergo yet another change in structure.
10	22	"Last Resort"; Transliteration: "Rasuto Rizōto" (Japanese: ラストリゾート)	March 12, 2009	January 7, 2011
The shadow of Gilgamesh hangs Kaaya up in the throne room. Jil and his comrades bust their way through the top of the tower, splitting up in separate directions. When Henaro is encountered, Uragon is forced to contend with her, while Jil, Fatina, and Utu are pitted against Tear of Ice. Shiera halts Ethana from furthering her rebellion, but Kelb arrives to intervene. Succubus wonders why Ki intends to destroy the tower after obtaining the blue crystal rod. Coopa, managing to escape from the cage, is saved by Melt when she is chased by an armored monster. Fatina uses her fire magic to obliterate Tear of Ice, consequently depleting her energy as a result. Neeba runs into Sword of Blood, easily able to annihilate him, which leads to a confrontation with the shadow of the king. Melt and Coopa soon catch up with Jil, Fatina, and Utu.
11	23	"He Who Shoots the Gods"; Transliteration: "Kami o Utsu Mono" (Japanese: 神をうつもの)	March 19, 2009	January 10, 2011
The battle between Neeba and the shadow of Gilgamesh ensues in the throne room. However, Neeba is defeated as soon as Jil and the others arrive. Jil is unable to take down the malicious shadow, being kicked around repeatedly. Henaro, somehow having control over Mite the Fool, retaliates and takes action against the shadow, but this damages her to the point of deactivation. Jil unties Kaaya from the wall, and the decisive battle begins as Jil charges at the shadow of Gilgamesh with full force. Just as the shadow of Gilgamesh prepares to kill Jil, Uragon stabs him through the chest, allowing Jil to finish him off. This also causes King Gilgamesh of Meskia to finally die. After the Succubus guilts Neeba into taking control, he shoots Henaro and obtains the blue crystal rod, which he uses to transform the Tower into its true form: a war machine for attacking the gods. It fires a devastating blast that breaks the land below.
12	24	"Without Letting Go"; Transliteration: "Tsunaida Te wa" (Japanese: つないだ手は)	March 26, 2009	January 10, 2011
Neeba uses the tower cannons to attack Ishtar, and Ishtar fires back. The battle causes casualties and destruction on Meskia below, and Kaaya prays to Ishtar to stop, but Ishtar tells her to stop Neeba. The group returns to the tower. Kaaya deals with Succubus when she tries to prevent Jil from stopping Neeba. Neeba, who has been transforming into a Druaga, provokes Jil into fighting him by claiming he will kill everyone. After Neeba fully transforms into Druaga, Jil proves to Neeba that he is the stronger brother by killing him in battle. While dying, Neeba admits defeat and that he was jealous of Jil's strength. The tower finally crumbles to pieces, as Jil and the others escape. The curse has finally been lifted, and life returns to normal.
