= Trial and error (disambiguation) =

Trial and error is a general method of problem solving.

Trial and error may also refer to:

== Music ==
- Trial & Error Records, an Australian record label
- Trial & Error (album), an album by the rapper Classified
- "Trial and Error", a song from Absolute Design by Engel
- "Trial and Error", a song from White Darkness by Nightingale

== Film ==
- Trial and Error (1962 film), a British comedy film starring Peter Sellers
- Trial & Error (1993 film), a TV film starring Tim Matheson
- Trial and Error (1997 film), an American film starring Jeff Daniels

== Television ==
=== Episodes ===
- "Trial and Error", 227 season 4, episode 19 (1989)
- "Trial and Error", Boon series 6, episode 3 (1991)
- "Trial and Error", Carson's Law episode 22 (1983)
- "Trial and Error", Chronicle (British) season 8, episode 9 (1973)
- "Trial and Error", Cleopatra 2525 season 1, episode 10 (2000)
- "Trial and Error", Dallas (1978) season 8, episode 23 (1985)
- "Trial and Error", Dallas (2012) season 2, episode 5 (2013)
- "Trial and Error", Dennis the Menace (1986) season 1, episode 65c (1986)
- "Trial and Error", Designing Women season 7, episode 10 (1992)
- "Trial and Error", Dixon of Dock Green series 19, episode 4 (1972)
- "Trial and Error", Garfield and Friends season 4, episode 2a (1991)
- "Trial and Error", Horizon (British) series 39, episode 12 (2003)
- "Trial and Error", Hudson & Rex episode 7 (2019)
- "Trial and Error", Jakers! The Adventures of Piggley Winks season 2, episode 3 (2004)
- "Trial and Error", Jamie Johnson series 2, episode 4 (2017)
- "Trial and Error", Joan of Arcadia season 2, episode 19 (2005)
- "Trial and Error", John Callahan's Quads! season 2, episode 6 (2002)
- "Trial and Error", Major season 5, episode 4 (2009)
- "Trial and Error", Mr. Justice Duncannon episode 4 (1963)
- "Trial and Error", Stargate Universe season 2, episode 6 (2010)
- "Trial and Error", Teen Mom season 2, episode 6 (2010)
- "Trial and Error", The Bill series 8, episode 34 (1992)
- "Trial and Error", The Bill series 24, episodes 64–65 (2008)
- "Trial and Error", The Practice season 1, episode 3 (1997)
- "Trial and Error", The Wayans Bros. season 2, episode 22 (1996)
- "Trial and Error", The White Shadow season 3, episode 10 (1981)
- "Trial and Error", What's Happening!! season 2, episode 3 (1977)
- "Trial and Error", Smart Guy season 2, episode 6 (1997)
- "Trial and Error", Spenser: For Hire season 2, episode 16 (1987)
- "Trial and Error", Supernatural (American) season 8, episode 14 (2013)
- "Trial and Error", That's My Mama season 1, episode 24 (1975)
- "Trial & Error", Army Wives season 4, episode 10 (2020)
- "Trial & Error", Knight's & Magic episode 6 (2017)
- "Trial & Error", Providence (American) season 3, episode 20 (2001)
- "Trial & Error", The Resident season 2, episode 7 (2018)

=== Shows ===
- Trial and Error (TV series), an American sitcom aired on CBS in 1988
- Trial & Error (TV series), an American sitcom airing on NBC in 2017

== Literature ==
- Trial and Error (Woodford book), a 1933 book on writing and the publishing industry by Jack Woodford
- Trial and Error (novel), a 1937 mystery novel by Anthony Berkeley
- Trial and Error: The American Civil Liberties Union and Its Impact on Your Family, by George Grant

== Other ==
- Trial & Error (company), a Hong Kong entertainment company

== See also ==
- Trials & Errors, a 2005 live album by the Magnolia Electric Co
