= Georgia on My Mind =

1930 anthem of the U.S. state of Georgia

- State song of Georgia
- Lyrics: Stuart Gorrell, 1930
- Music: Hoagy Carmichael, 1930
- Published: December 22, 1930; 95 years ago Southern Music Publishing Co., Inc.
- Adopted: 1979; 47 years ago

"Georgia on My Mind"
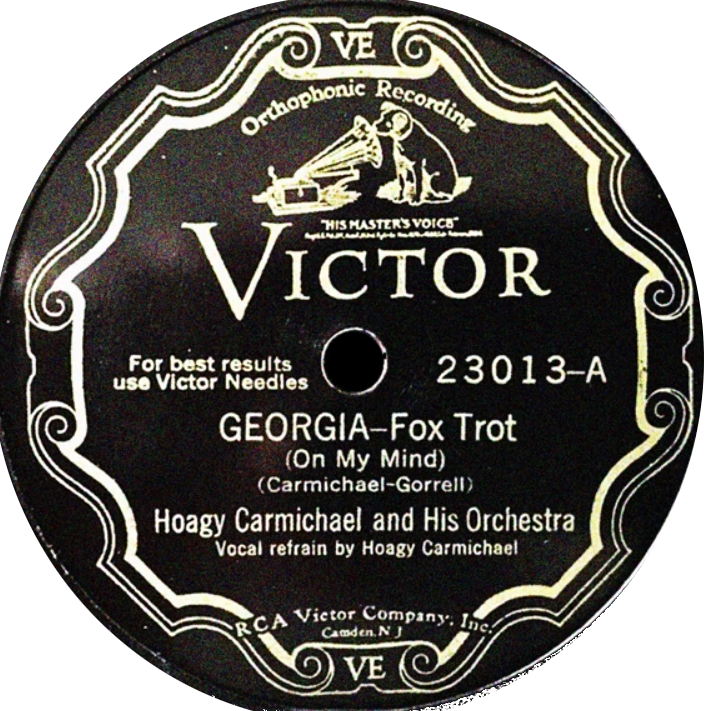

Single by Hoagy Carmichael and his Orchestra
- B-side: "One Night in Havana"
- Released: 1930
- Recorded: September 15, 1930
- Studio: RCA Victor, New York City
- Genre: Traditional pop
- Label: Victor
- Composer: Hoagy Carmichael
- Lyricist: Stuart Gorrell

"Georgia on My Mind" is a 1930 song written by Hoagy Carmichael and Stuart Gorrell, and first recorded that same year by Carmichael at the RCA Victor Studios at 155 East 24th Street in New York City. The song has been most often associated with singer Ray Charles, who was a native of the U.S. state of Georgia in the United States, and recorded it for his 1960 album The Genius Hits the Road.

In 1979, the State of Georgia through its General Assembly of Georgia (state legislature), designated Charles's version the official state song. The song has become part of the Great American Songbook tradition. In June 2026, CBS News included the song in its list of the 250 essential American songs of the past 250 years.

"Georgia on My Mind" has been inducted into the Grammy Hall of Fame twice. The first induction was in 1993 for the 1960 recording on the ABC-Paramount label by Charles. The second induction happened in 2014 for the earlier 1930 recording on the RCA Victor label by Carmichael and His Orchestra.

The original 1930 composition entered the American public domain on January 1, 2026, which means it's free to use. (Note: Under R205347 and Title 17 of the US Code.)

== Background and original recording ==
It is generally asserted that composer Hoagy Carmichael wrote the song about his sister, Georgia. However, Carmichael wrote in his memoir Sometimes I Wonder that saxophonist Frankie Trumbauer suggested he should write a song called "Georgia", stating that no one ever lost anything writing about the "South" – never mentioning his sister.

Trumbauer even gave him the first two words, "Georgia, Georgia...", which Carmichael ended up using while working later on the song with his roommate, Stuart Gorrell. Gorrell's name was absent from the copyright application papers submitted to the U.S. Copyright Office, but Carmichael sent him royalty checks afterwards anyway.

Carmichael first recorded "Georgia on My Mind", with Bix Beiderbecke on cornet, in New York City on September 15, 1930.

All four had no connection to the state of Georgia. Trumbauer was from Illinois, Carmichael and Gorrell were both from Indiana, and Beiderbecke was from Iowa.

== Ray Charles version and Georgia state connection ==
"Georgia on My Mind"

Single by Ray Charles

from the album The Genius Hits the Road
- B-side: "Carry Me Back to Old Virginny"
- Released: September 1960
- Recorded: May 1960
- Genre: Soul; orchestral pop; country
- Length: 3:35
- Label: ABC-Paramount (USA); Stateside (UK)
- Composer: Hoagy Carmichael
- Lyricist: Stuart Gorrell
- Producer: Sid Feller

Ray Charles singles chronology
"Tell the Truth" (1960)	"Georgia on My Mind" (1960)	"Ruby" (1960)

Over the coming years, the song would be covered by many artists, including Louis Armstrong, Coleman Hawkins, and Mildred Bailey. Decades later it would be recorded by Swing artists like Fats Waller, Django Reinhart, and Ethel Waters, and big bands like Artie Shaw's and Glenn Miller's.

It was not until 1960 that Ray Charles recorded his version of the song that went to No. 1 on the Billboard Hot 100. Charles's hit rendition would become the most widely-known version of the tune from this time on. Charles being born in Albany, Georgia along with his stellar performance, likely cemented the Georgia state connection.

Chart (1960–1961)	Peak position
Belgium (Ultratop 50 Wallonia)	47
UK Singles (Official Charts)	24
US Billboard Hot 100	1

Chart (2013)	Peak position
France (SNEP)	117

In 1977, Robert Grossman, James Picker and Craig Whitaker created a clay animation short, Jimmy the C, in which U.S. President Jimmy Carter sings in Ray Charles's version of the song.

In 1979, the song was designated the State Song of Georgia, and Charles was invited to perform it at the state capitol.

The TV series Designing Women used an instrumental version of "Georgia on My Mind" as its opening theme. During the opening credits of the show's sixth season in 1991, Charles performed his version of the song live on piano while the show's main cast (Dixie Carter, Annie Potts, Julia Duffy, Jan Hooks and Meshach Taylor) watched him.

Gladys Knight performed the song at the 1996 Summer Olympics opening ceremony held in Atlanta, Georgia as a tribute to the host state.

In 2003, Rolling Stone magazine named the Ray Charles version of "Georgia on My Mind" the 44th greatest song of all time.

The original lyrics, including the commonly excised introductory verse, are in the Georgia Code under license.

== Ella Fitzgerald version ==
In 1962, famed jazz singer Ella Fitzgerald released a rendition of the song, produced by Norman Granz, on the album Ella Swings Gently with Nelson.

== The Hawks/The Band version ==
"Georgia on My Mind"

Single by the Band
- B-side: "The Night They Drove Old Dixie Down"
- Released: November 1976
- Length: 3:55
- Label: Capitol
- Composer: Hoagy Carmichael
- Lyricist: Stuart Gorrell
- Producer: The Band

The Band singles chronology
"Twilight" (1976)	"Georgia on My Mind" (1976)	"Theme from The Last Waltz" (1978)

The song was a standard at performances by Ronnie Hawkins and The Hawks, where it was sung by pianist Richard Manuel after 1964. When The Hawks broke up and formed The Band, they kept the song in their repertoire. They recorded a studio version of the song for Jimmy Carter's presidential bid in 1976. It was released as a single that year as well as on their 1977 album Islands.

== Willie Nelson version ==
"Georgia on My Mind"

Single by Willie Nelson

from the album Stardust
- B-side: "On the Sunny Side of the Street"
- Released: March 25, 1978
- Recorded: 1977
- Genre: Country
- Length: 3:55
- Label: Columbia
- Composer: Hoagy Carmichael
- Lyricist: Stuart Gorrell
- Producer: Booker T. Jones

Willie Nelson singles chronology
"I Love You a Thousand Ways" (1977)	"Georgia on My Mind" (1978)	"Blue Skies" (1978)

Willie Nelson recorded the song on Stardust, his 1978 album of standards. It was released as single, peaked at No. 1 for a single week, and ranked for sixteen weeks on Billboard’s country charts. Nelson's version won him a Grammy Award in 1979 at the 21st Annual Grammy Awards for Best Country Vocal Performance, Male.

Chart (1978)	Peak position
US Hot Country Songs (Billboard)	1
US Billboard Hot 100	84
Canadian RPM Country Tracks	1
Canadian RPM Top Singles	86
Canadian RPM Adult Contemporary Tracks	16

== See also ==
- List of 1930s jazz standards
- Spirit of Atlanta Drum and Bugle Corps
- Atlanta CV Drum and Bugle Corps
