= List of Major episodes =

- No. of episodes: 154

Release
- Original network: NHK Educational TV
- Original release: November 13, 2004 – September 25, 2010

Major is a 2004 Japanese anime television series based on Takuya Mitsuda's award-winning manga series of the same name. Produced by Studio Hibari and later by SynergySP, the series aired in Japan on NHK Educational TV from November 13, 2004, to September 25, 2010.

An anime adaptation sequel of Major, Major 2nd, aired in NHK-E from April 7 to September 22, 2018. A second season premiered on April 4, 2020. On April 25, 2020, it was announced that new episodes of second season would be delayed due to the ongoing COVID-19 pandemic. The series resumed with the fifth episode on May 30, 2020. On June 14, 2020, it went on hiatus again and the eight episode was postponed from June 20, 2020, to July 11, 2020.

== Episodes ==
=== Season 1 ===
No.	Title	Original release date
1	"Gorō's Dream and Daddy's Dream"; Transliteration: "Gorō no Yume, Otosan no Yume" (Japanese: 吾郎の夢, おとさんの夢)	November 13, 2004
2	"Their Friendship"; Transliteration: "Futatsu no Yūjyō" (Japanese: 二つの友情)	November 20, 2004
3	"I Hate You, Daddy!"; Transliteration: "Otosan Nante Kirai da!" (Japanese: おとさんなんてキライだ!)	November 27, 2004
4	"A Birthday One Day Late"; Transliteration: "Ichinichi Okure no Tanjyōbi" (Japanese: 一日遅れの誕生日)	December 4, 2004
5	"The Man From the Majors"; Transliteration: "Mejā no Otoko" (Japanese: メジャーの男)	December 11, 2004
6	"Goodbye..."; Transliteration: "Sayonara...." (Japanese: さよなら. . . .)	December 18, 2004
7	"Gorō Honda, Age Nine!"; Transliteration: "Honda Gorō, 9 Sai!" (Japanese: 本田吾郎, 9歳!)	December 25, 2004
8	"Team Complete!"; Transliteration: "Chīmu Kessei!" (Japanese: チーム結成!)	January 8, 2005
9	"Alone on the Mound"; Transliteration: "Hitori Bocchi no Maundo" (Japanese: 一人ぼっちのマウンド)	January 15, 2005
10	"Showdown in the Rain"; Transliteration: "Ame no Nessen" (Japanese: 雨の熱戦)	January 22, 2005
11	"The Team Dad Played On"; Transliteration: "Otosan no Ita Chīmu" (Japanese: おとさんのいたチーム)	January 29, 2005
12	"An Invitation From Gibson"; Transliteration: "Gibuson kara no Shōtaijyō" (Japanese: ギブソンからの招待状)	February 5, 2005
13	"Summer! Baseball! Training Camp!"; Transliteration: "Natsu da, Yakyū da, Gasshuku da!" (Japanese: 夏だ, 野球だ, 合宿だ!)	February 12, 2005
14	"Reckless Practice Match!"; Transliteration: "Mubō na Renshū Shiai" (Japanese: 無謀な練習試合)	February 19, 2005
15	"The Coach's Feelings"; Transliteration: "Kantoku no Omoi" (Japanese: 監督の思い)	March 5, 2005
16	"I Quit!"; Transliteration: "Yameta!" (Japanese: ヤメタ!)	March 12, 2005
17	"Tournament begins!" Transliteration: "Taikai Sutāto!" (Japanese: 大会スタート!)	March 19, 2005
18	"Aim for victory!" Transliteration: "Mezase, Hatsushōri!" (Japanese: 目指せ, 初勝利!)	March 26, 2005
19	"Mother's Happiness"; Transliteration: "Kāsan no Shiawase" (Japanese: 母さんの幸せ)	April 2, 2005
20	"Gorō's Mistake!?"; Transliteration: "Gorō Kōban!?" (Japanese: 吾郎降板?!)	April 9, 2005
21	"This is Baseball!"; Transliteration: "Kore ga Yakyū!" (Japanese: これが野球!)	April 16, 2005
22	"The Night Before the Duel"; Transliteration: "Kessen Zenya" (Japanese: 決戦前夜)	April 23, 2005
23	"Do Not Lose!"; Transliteration: "Makeru Ki Nashi!" (Japanese: 負ける気ナシ!)	April 30, 2005
24	"Chase It! Overcome It!"; Transliteration: "Oitsuke! Oikose!" (Japanese: 追いつけ!追い越せ!)	May 7, 2005
25	"Everyone Together"; Transliteration: "Minna de Isshoni" (Japanese: みんなで一緒に)	May 14, 2005
26	"Don't Say Goodbye"; Transliteration: "Sayonara wa Iwanai" (Japanese: さよならは言わない)	May 21, 2005

=== Season 2 ===
No. overall	No. in season	Title	Original release date
27	1	"He Returns..."; Transliteration: "Kaette Kita..." (Japanese: 帰ってきた. . .)	December 12, 2005
28	2	"There is one dream!" Transliteration: "Yume wa Hitotsu!" (Japanese: 夢はひとつ!)	December 17, 2005
29	3	"The Baseball Club Starts!"; Transliteration: "Yakyū-bu Shidō!" (Japanese: 野球部 始動!)	December 24, 2005
30	4	"Rivals Reunite"; Transliteration: "Raibaru Saikai" (Japanese: ライバル再会)	January 7, 2006
31	5	"Toshiya's Past"; Transliteration: "Toshiya no Kako" (Japanese: 寿也の過去)	January 14, 2006
32	6	"The Recruiter's Conspiracy"; Transliteration: "Sukauto no Inbō" (Japanese: スカウトの陰謀)	January 21, 2006
33	7	"Powerful Rival! Tomonoura"; Transliteration: "Kyōteki! Tomonoura" (Japanese: 強敵!友ノ浦)	January 28, 2006
34	8	"...For What Reason?"; Transliteration: "Nan no Tame ni..." (Japanese: 何のために. . .)	February 4, 2006
35	9	"The End of the Battle"; Transliteration: "Nettō no Hate ni" (Japanese: 熱闘の果てに)	February 11, 2006
36	10	"A Fresh Resolve"; Transliteration: "Aratanaru Ketsui" (Japanese: 新たなる決意)	February 18, 2006
37	11	"The Narrow Gate to Kaido"; Transliteration: "Kaidō e no Semaki Mon" (Japanese: 海堂への狭き門)	February 25, 2006
38	12	"The Ticket to Kaido"; Transliteration: "Kaidō e no Kippu" (Japanese: 海同への切符)	March 4, 2006
39	13	"See Ya..."; Transliteration: "Mata·na..." (Japanese: また·な. . .)	March 11, 2006
40	14	"The Island of Dreams"; Transliteration: "Yume o Miru Shima" (Japanese: 夢を見る島)	March 18, 2006
41	15	"The Requirements of a Pitcher"; Transliteration: "Piccha no Jōken" (Japanese: ピッチャーの条件)	March 25, 2006
42	16	"A Genuine Baseball Kid"; Transliteration: "Ten'nen Yakyū Kosō" (Japanese: 天然野球子僧)	April 1, 2006
43	17	"Fleeting Summer Break"; Transliteration: "Tsuka no Ma no Natsuyasumi" (Japanese: つかの間の夏休み)	April 8, 2006
44	18	"Distasteful Baseball"; Transliteration: "Fuyukaina Yakyū" (Japanese: 不愉快な野球)	April 15, 2006
45	19	"The Force of Scholarship Students"; Transliteration: "Tokutaisei no Jitsuryoku" (Japanese: 特待生の実力)	April 22, 2006
46	20	"Gorō vs. Manual Baseball"; Transliteration: "Gorō vs Manyuaru Yakyū" (Japanese: 吾郎vsマニュアル野球)	April 29, 2006
47	21	"Together with You"; Transliteration: "Kimi to Issho ni" (Japanese: 君と一緒に)	May 5, 2006
48	22	"Kaidou's Secret"; Transliteration: "Kaidō no Himitsu" (Japanese: 海堂の秘密)	May 13, 2006
49	23	"Egashira's Expectations"; Transliteration: "Egashira no Omowaku" (Japanese: 江頭の思惑)	May 20, 2006
50	24	"Varsity Challenge"; Transliteration: "Ichigun e no Chōsen" (Japanese: 一軍への挑戦)	May 27, 2006
51	25	"With My Own Two Feet"; Transliteration: "Jibun no Ashi de" (Japanese: 自分の足で)	June 3, 2006
52	26	"Goodbye!"; Transliteration: "Aba yo!" (Japanese: あばよ!)	June 10, 2006

=== Season 3 ===
No. overall	No. in season	Title	Original release date
53	1	"Start from Zero"; Transliteration: "Zero kara no Sutāto" (Japanese: ゼロからのスタート)	January 6, 2007
54	2	"New Friends"; Transliteration: "Atarashī Nakama" (Japanese: 新しい仲間)	January 13, 2007
55	3	"From Father to Son"; Transliteration: "Chichi kara Ko e" (Japanese: 父から子へ)	January 20, 2007
56	4	"Reckless Gamble"; Transliteration: "Mubō na Kake" (Japanese: 無謀な賭け)	January 27, 2007
57	5	"Our Grounds"; Transliteration: "Oretachi no Guraundo" (Japanese: 俺たちのグラウンド)	February 3, 2007
58	6	"Their Respective Choices"; Transliteration: "Sorezore no Sentaku" (Japanese: それぞれの選択)	February 10, 2007
59	7	"Unexpected Visitor"; Transliteration: "Totsuzen no Hōmonsha" (Japanese: 突然の訪問者)	February 17, 2007
60	8	"Egashira's Plot"; Transliteration: "Egashira no Inbō" (Japanese: 江頭の陰謀)	February 24, 2007
61	9	"Absent Ace"; Transliteration: "Ēsu Fuzai" (Japanese: エース不在)	March 3, 2007
62	10	"Contagious Fighting Spirit"; Transliteration: "Densen suru Tōshi" (Japanese: 伝染する闘志)	March 10, 2007
63	11	"Wounded Ace"; Transliteration: "Teoi no Ēsu" (Japanese: 手負いのエース)	March 17, 2007
64	12	"Battle against Mifune, Start!"; Transliteration: "Mifune-sen Kaishi!" (Japanese: 三船戦開始!)	March 24, 2007
65	13	"Climax! Mifune Battle"; Transliteration: "Hakunetsu! Mifune-sen" (Japanese: 白熱!三船戦)	March 31, 2007
66	14	"Willpower vs. Willpower"; Transliteration: "Iji vs Iji" (Japanese: 意地vs意地)	April 7, 2007
67	15	"Full Swing!"; Transliteration: "Furu Suingu!" (Japanese: フルスイング!)	April 14, 2007
68	16	"Unexpected Reunion"; Transliteration: "Igai na Saigai" (Japanese: 意外な再会)	April 21, 2007
69	17	"Pitching Battle!"; Transliteration: "Dōshusen!" (Japanese: 投手戦!)	April 28, 2007
70	18	"Last Spurt!"; Transliteration: "Rasto Supāto!" (Japanese: ラストスパート!)	May 5, 2007
71	19	"Challenge to the Top"; Transliteration: "Ōja e no Chōsen" (Japanese: 王者への挑戦)	May 12, 2007
72	20	"Chance! Manual Baseball"; Transliteration: "Gekinashi! Manuaru Yakyū" (Japanese: 隙なし!マニュアル野球)	May 19, 2007
73	21	"Toshiya's Secret Plan"; Transliteration: "Toshiya no Hisaku" (Japanese: 寿也の秘策)	May 26, 2007
74	22	"Head to Head Battle"; Transliteration: "Makkō Shōbu" (Japanese: 真っ向勝負)	June 2, 2007
75	23	"A Close Fight"; Transliteration: "Giri Giri no Tatakai" (Japanese: ギリギリの戦い)	June 9, 2007
76	24	"The End of the Strategy"; Transliteration: "Sakubō no Ketsumatsu" (Japanese: 策謀の結末)	June 16, 2007
77	25	"Ace Full of Injuries"; Transliteration: "Kizu Darake no Ēsu" (Japanese: 傷だらけのエース)	June 23, 2007
78	26	"Towards Your Dreams"; Transliteration: "Yume no Butai e" (Japanese: 夢の舞台へ)	June 30, 2007

=== Season 4 ===
No. overall	No. in season	Title	Original release date
79	1	"To the Birthplace of Baseball"; Transliteration: "Yakyū no Furusato e" (Japanese: 野球の故郷(ふるさと)へ)	January 5, 2008
80	2	"Tryout"; Transliteration: "Toraiauto" (Japanese: トライアウト)	January 12, 2008
81	3	"I'll Do It"; Transliteration: "Yatte Yaru!" (Japanese: やってやる!)	January 19, 2008
82	4	"This is the Majors!"; Transliteration: "Kore ga Mejā!" (Japanese: これがメジャー!)	January 26, 2008
83	5	"Sign towards the World"; Transliteration: "Sekai e no Michishirube" (Japanese: 世界への道しるべ)	February 2, 2008
84	6	"Unforgivable!!"; Transliteration: "Yurusane~e!!" (Japanese: ゆるさねぇ!!)	February 9, 2008
85	7	"Courage, full score!" Transliteration: "Dokyō Manten!" (Japanese: 度胸満点!)	February 16, 2008
86	8	"Debut!"; Transliteration: "Debyū!" (Japanese: デビュー!)	February 23, 2008
87	9	"Challenger"; Transliteration: "Chōsensha" (Japanese: 挑戦者)	March 1, 2008
88	10	"It's not impossible" Transliteration: "Muri Jane~e" (Japanese: 無理じゃねぇ)	March 8, 2008
89	11	"Try and aim for it" Transliteration: "Neratte Miru ka" (Japanese: 狙ってみるか)	March 15, 2008
90	12	"Liar!"; Transliteration: "Usotsuki!" (Japanese: 嘘つき!)	March 22, 2008
91	13	"A Stupid Bet"; Transliteration: "Baka na Kake" (Japanese: バカな賭け)	March 29, 2008
92	14	"Keene's Past"; Transliteration: "Kīn no Kako" (Japanese: キーンの過去)	April 5, 2008
93	15	"Hero"; Transliteration: "Hīrō" (Japanese: ヒーロー)	April 12, 2008
94	16	"I'm fed up!" Transliteration: "Mukatsuku!" (Japanese: ムカつく!)	April 19, 2008
95	17	"Where to Aim"; Transliteration: "Mezasubeki Mono" (Japanese: 目指すべきもの)	April 26, 2008
96	18	"Alice's Dream, Everyone's Dream"; Transliteration: "Arisu no Yume Min'na no Yume" (Japanese: アリスの夢 みんなの夢)	May 3, 2008
97	19	"Responsibility"; Transliteration: "Kejime" (Japanese: ケジメ)	May 10, 2008
98	20	"Get out!" Transliteration: "Deteike!" (Japanese: 出て行け!)	May 17, 2008
99	21	"Trouble from the Start"; Transliteration: "Haran no Makuake" (Japanese: 波乱の幕開け)	May 24, 2008
100	22	"The Single Ball of Fate"; Transliteration: "Unmei no Ikkyū" (Japanese: 運命の1球)	May 31, 2008
101	23	"One More Deciding Match"; Transliteration: "Mōhitotsu no Kessen" (Japanese: もう一つの決戦)	June 7, 2008
102	24	"A Great Man"; Transliteration: "Idai na Otoko" (Japanese: 偉大な男)	June 14, 2008
103	25	"A Truly Worthy Rival"; Transliteration: "Honmono no Raibaru" (Japanese: 本物の好敵手(ライバル))	June 21, 2008
104	26	"An Oath"; Transliteration: "Chikai" (Japanese: 誓い)	June 28, 2008

=== Season 5 ===
No. overall	No. in season	Title	Original release date
105	1	"Once More"; Transliteration: "Futatabi" (Japanese: ふたたび)	January 10, 2009
106	2	"Feelings Different between the Two"; Transliteration: "Futari no Ondosa" (Japanese: 二人の温度差)	January 17, 2009
107	3	"Representative Close!"; Transliteration: "Daihyō Shūketsu!" (Japanese: 代表集結!)	January 24, 2009
108	4	"Trial and Error"; Transliteration: "Shikōsakugo" (Japanese: 試行錯誤)	January 31, 2009
109	5	"Young Japan"; Transliteration: "Yangu Japan" (Japanese: ヤングジャパン)	February 7, 2009
110	6	"Unselfish Fastball"; Transliteration: "Muyoku no Sutorēto" (Japanese: 無欲の直球(ストレート))	February 14, 2009
111	7	"Sudden Notification"; Transliteration: "Totsuzen no Tsūtatsu" (Japanese: 突然の通達)	February 21, 2009
112	8	"Everyone's Respective Expectations"; Transliteration: "Sorezore no Omoi" (Japanese: それぞれの思い)	February 28, 2009
113	9	"Pressure and Real Worth"; Transliteration: "Jūatsu to Shinka" (Japanese: 重圧と真価)	March 7, 2009
114	10	"Polished Fangs"; Transliteration: "Migakareta Kiba" (Japanese: 磨かれた牙)	March 14, 2009
115	11	"Not a Man!!"; Transliteration: "Otoko Jane~e! !" (Japanese: 男じゃねぇ!!)	March 21, 2009
116	12	"The Curse"; Transliteration: "Jubaku" (Japanese: 呪縛)	March 28, 2009
117	13	"Japanese Baseball"; Transliteration: "Nippon no Yakyū" (Japanese: 日本の野球)	April 4, 2009
118	14	"I'm Alright!"; Transliteration: "Daijōbu!" (Japanese: 大丈夫!)	April 11, 2009
119	15	"Aggressive Baseball"; Transliteration: "Aguresshibu·Bēsubōru" (Japanese: アグレッシブ·ベースボール)	April 18, 2009
120	16	"Everyone's Resolution"; Transliteration: "Sorezore no Kakugo" (Japanese: それぞれの覚悟)	April 25, 2009
121	17	"America's Pride"; Transliteration: "Amerika no Hokori" (Japanese: アメリカの誇り)	May 2, 2009
122	18	"Towards the Promised Place"; Transliteration: "Yakusoku no Basho e" (Japanese: 約束の場所へ)	May 9, 2009
123	19	"Pitching's Origin"; Transliteration: "Picchingu no Genten" (Japanese: ピッチングの原点)	May 16, 2009
124	20	"With Chest of Pride"; Transliteration: "Hokori o Mune ni" (Japanese: 誇りを胸に)	May 23, 2009
125	21	"For Oneself's Sake"; Transliteration: "Jibun Jishin no Tame" (Japanese: 自分自身のため)	May 30, 2009
126	22	"The Neverending Dream"; Transliteration: "Owaranai Yume" (Japanese: 終わらない夢)	June 6, 2009
127	23	"Father's Back"; Transliteration: "Chichi no Senaka" (Japanese: 父の背中)	June 13, 2009
128	24	"End of the Struggle"; Transliteration: "Shitō no Hate" (Japanese: 死闘の果て)	June 27, 2009
129	25	"The Road to Tomorrow"; Transliteration: "Ashita e no Michi" (Japanese: 明日への道)	July 4, 2009

=== Season 6 ===
No. overall	No. in season	Title	Original release date
130	1	"Super Rookie"; Transliteration: "Sūpā Rūkī" (Japanese: スーパールーキー)	April 3, 2010
131	2	"A Prominent Debut!"; Transliteration: "Senretsu Debyū!" (Japanese: 鮮烈デビュー!)	April 10, 2010
132	3	"In an Impossible Dilemma"; Transliteration: "Nigebanaki Pinchi" (Japanese: 逃げ場なきピンチ)	April 17, 2010
133	4	"The Southpaw in Distress"; Transliteration: "Nayameru Sausupō" (Japanese: 悩めるサウスポー)	April 24, 2010
134	5	"The Fruits of the Treatment"; Transliteration: "Chiryō no Seika" (Japanese: 治療の成果)	May 1, 2010
135	6	"What it Takes to be a Pro"; Transliteration: "Puro no Shishitsu" (Japanese: プロの資質)	May 8, 2010
136	7	"Rookies' Troubles"; Transliteration: "Rūkī no Kunō" (Japanese: ルーキーの苦悩)	May 15, 2010
137	8	"An Electrifying Return"; Transliteration: "Dengeki Fukki" (Japanese: 電撃復帰)	May 22, 2010
138	9	"Fully Back on the Mound"; Transliteration: "Fukkatsu no Maundo" (Japanese: 復活のマウンド)	May 29, 2010
139	10	"Each Person's Summer"; Transliteration: "Sorezore no Natsu" (Japanese: それぞれの夏)	June 5, 2010
140	11	"The Entrusted Dream"; Transliteration: "Takusareta Yume" (Japanese: 託された夢)	June 12, 2010
141	12	"The Unspoken Rule"; Transliteration: "Anmoku no Rūru" (Japanese: 暗黙のルール)	June 19, 2010
142	13	"A Chain of Negativity"; Transliteration: "Fu no Rensa" (Japanese: 負の連鎖)	June 26, 2010
143	14	"Ace's Responsibility"; Transliteration: "Ēsu no Sekinin" (Japanese: エースの責任)	July 3, 2010
144	15	"Weak Point"; Transliteration: "Uīkupointo" (Japanese: ウイークポイント)	July 10, 2010
145	16	"A Resolute Will"; Transliteration: "Dankotaru Ishi" (Japanese: 断固たる意志)	July 17, 2010
146	17	"Unexpected Guest"; Transliteration: "Maneka Rezaru Kyaku" (Japanese: 招かれざる客)	July 24, 2010
147	18	"Different?!"; Transliteration: "Rashikune~e!" (Japanese: らしくねぇ!)	July 31, 2010
148	19	"Creeping Shadow"; Transliteration: "Shinobi Yoru Kage" (Japanese: 忍び寄る影)	August 7, 2010
149	20	"That Dream"; Transliteration: "Soko ni Aru Yume" (Japanese: そこにある夢)	August 21, 2010
150	21	"Never Give Up!"; Transliteration: "Akirameru na!" (Japanese: 諦めるな!)	August 28, 2010
151	22	"Remaining Opportunity"; Transliteration: "Nokosareta Chansu" (Japanese: 残されたチャンス)	September 4, 2010
152	23	"Beyond Capability"; Transliteration: "Genkai o Koete" (Japanese: 限界を超えて)	September 11, 2010
153	24	"Tenacity to Glory"; Transliteration: "Eikō e no Shūnen" (Japanese: 栄光への執念)	September 18, 2010
154	25	"To the Future"; Transliteration: "Mirai e <Owari>" (Japanese: 未来へ ＜終＞)	September 25, 2010

== Film and OVAs ==
=== The Ball of Friendship ===
No.	Title	Original release date
1	"Major: The Ball of Friendship" "Mejā Yūjō no Ichi-kyū (Uiningu Shotto)" (Japanese: メジャー 友情の一球（ウイニングショット）)	December 13, 2008
Starting off after the events of Season 4, Goro Shigeno returns to Japan after the Minor League but not before stopping by Fukuoka to meet his old friends. Goro remembers back after he and his newly-wed stepparents moved to Fukuoka. He joins a new little league team under the promise of not to pitch due to his shoulder injury. As he meets new friends and clashing with new rivals, Goro continues to pursue his dream until he clings into despair. How Goro became a southpaw, his memories will tell.

=== Message ===
No.	Title	Original release date
1	"Message"	December 17, 2010

=== World Series ===
No.	Title	Original release date
2	"World Series 1"; Transliteration: "Wārudo Shirīzu 1" (Japanese: ワールドシリーズ 1)	December 16, 2011
3	"World Series 2"; Transliteration: "Wārudo Shirīzu 2" (Japanese: ワールドシリーズ 2)	January 18, 2012

== Major 2nd ==
=== 2nd Series Overview ===
Season	Episodes	Originally released	
Season	Episodes	First released	Last released
1	25	April 7, 2018	September 22, 2018
2	25	April 4, 2020	November 7, 2020

=== 2nd Season 1 ===
No.	Title (Note: All English episode titles taken from Crunchyroll.)	Original release date
1	"Daigo's Dream"; Transliteration: "Daigo no Yume" (Japanese: 大吾の夢)	April 7, 2018
2	"If I Wasn't the Second"; Transliteration: "Niseidenakereba" (Japanese: 二世でなければ)	April 14, 2018
3	"The Two Juniors"; Transliteration: "Futari no Junia" (Japanese: ふたりのジュニア)	April 21, 2018
4	"The Talent of Loving Baseball"; Transliteration: "Yakyū o Sukina Sainō" (Japanese: 野球を好きな才能)	April 28, 2018
5	"Commence Special Training!"; Transliteration: "Tokkun Kaishi!" (Japanese: 特訓開始！)	May 5, 2018
6	"Catch"; Transliteration: "Kyacchi Bōru" (Japanese: キャッチボール)	May 12, 2018
7	"Some Day, For Sure"; Transliteration: "Itsuka Kanarazu" (Japanese: いつか必ず)	May 19, 2018
8	"Toshiya's Personal Training"; Transliteration: "Toshiya no Kojin Ressun" (Japanese: 寿也の個人レッスン)	May 26, 2018
9	"Hikaru's Feelings"; Transliteration: "Hikaru no Omoi" (Japanese: 光の思い)	June 2, 2018
10	"The Summer Tournament Begins!"; Transliteration: "Natsu no Taikai Sutāto!" (Japanese: 夏の大会スタート！)	June 9, 2018
11	"Now I've Done It!"; Transliteration: "Yacchimatta!" (Japanese: やっちまった！)	June 16, 2018
12	"Battery Debut"; Transliteration: "Batterī Debyū" (Japanese: バッテリーデビュー)	June 23, 2018
13	"Mutsuko's Melancholy"; Transliteration: "Mutsuko no Yūutsu" (Japanese: 睦子の憂うつ)	June 30, 2018
14	"The Experience Level of the Catcher"; Transliteration: "Kyacchā no Keikenchi" (Japanese: キャッチャーの経験値)	July 7, 2018
15	"The Key to Success"; Transliteration: "Kōryaku no Tegakari" (Japanese: 攻略の手がかり)	July 14, 2018
16	"All-Out Battle"; Transliteration: "Zenryoku Shōbu" (Japanese: 全力勝負)	July 21, 2018
17	"I Don't Want to Lose"; Transliteration: "Maketa Kunai" (Japanese: 負けたくない)	July 28, 2018
18	"The Mayumura Siblings"; Transliteration: "Mayumura Kyōdai" (Japanese: 眉村姉弟)	August 4, 2018
19	"Before the Big Game"; Transliteration: "Kessen o Mae'ni" (Japanese: 決戦を前に)	August 11, 2018
20	"The Touto Match - Play Ball!"; Transliteration: "Tōto-sen Purēbōru!" (Japanese: 東斗戦プレーボール！)	August 18, 2018
21	"Daigo and Hikaru"; Transliteration: "Daigo to Hikaru" (Japanese: 大吾と光)	August 25, 2018
22	"Ace on the Mound"; Transliteration: "Ēsu Tōban" (Japanese: エース登板)	September 1, 2018
23	"The Hit of Destiny"; Transliteration: "Unmei no Ichida" (Japanese: 運命の一打)	September 8, 2018
24	"No Way...!"; Transliteration: "Usoda...!" (Japanese: うそだ…！)	September 15, 2018
25	"The Promise"; Transliteration: "Yakusoku" (Japanese: 約束)	September 22, 2018

=== 2nd Season 2 ===
No. overall	No. in season	Title	Original release date
26	1	"The Infamous New Members"; Transliteration: "Uwasa no Shin'nyūbuin" (Japanese: 噂の新入部員)	April 4, 2020
27	2	"That Catcher's Got a Sharp Tongue"; Transliteration: "Sono Kyatchā, Karakuchi ni Tsuki" (Japanese: そのキャッチャー、辛口につき)	April 11, 2020
28	3	"What's with this Guy!?"; Transliteration: "Nan'ya Koitsu!?" (Japanese: なんやコイツ！？)	April 18, 2020
29	4	"Captain Daigo"; Transliteration: "Kyaputen Daigo" (Japanese: キャプテン大吾)	April 25, 2020
30	5	"Girl Power, Baseball-Style"; Transliteration: "Yakyūjoshi no Jitsuryoku" (Japanese: 野球女子の実力)	May 30, 2020
31	6	"Backup"; Transliteration: "Bakkuappu" (Japanese: バックアップ)	June 6, 2020
32	7	"Mutsuko's Special Training"; Transliteration: "Mutsuko no Tokkun" (Japanese: 睦子の特訓)	June 13, 2020
33	8	"Extreme Small Ball"; Transliteration: "Chō Kidō-ryoku Yakyū" (Japanese: 超機動力野球)	July 11, 2020
34	9	"No Freakin' Way!"; Transliteration: "Zettai Iyaya!" (Japanese: 絶対いやや！)	July 18, 2020
35	10	"That Old Daigo Magic?"; Transliteration: "Daigo Majikku?" (Japanese: 大吾マジック？)	July 25, 2020
36	11	"Last Inning"; Transliteration: "Rasuto Iningu" (Japanese: ラストイニング)	August 1, 2020
37	12	"Cloudy, Then Rainy?"; Transliteration: "Kumori Nochi Ame?" (Japanese: くもりのち雨？)	August 8, 2020
38	13	"Semi-Finals Time!"; Transliteration: "Sā Junkesshō!" (Japanese: さあ準決勝！)	August 15, 2020
39	14	"An Unexpected Reunion"; Transliteration: "Igaina Saikai" (Japanese: 意外な再会)	August 22, 2020
40	15	"Torn Feelings"; Transliteration: "Kireta Kimochi" (Japanese: 切れた気持ち)	August 29, 2020
41	16	"Reconnected Feelings"; Transliteration: "Tsunagatta Omoi" (Japanese: 繋がった想い)	September 5, 2020
42	17	"The Unexpected Pitcher"; Transliteration: "Masaka no Tōban" (Japanese: まさかの登板)	September 12, 2020
43	18	"We've Come This Far"; Transliteration: "Koko Made Kitara" (Japanese: ここまで来たら)	September 19, 2020
44	19	"Nice Game!"; Transliteration: "Naisu Gēmu!" (Japanese: ナイスゲーム！)	September 26, 2020
45	20	"A New Member?"; Transliteration: "Aratana Menbā?" (Japanese: 新たなメンバー？)	October 3, 2020
46	21	"Lock On!"; Transliteration: "Rokku On!" (Japanese: ロックオン！)	October 10, 2020
47	22	"You Disappoint Me!"; Transliteration: "Misokonatta yo!" (Japanese: 見損なったよ！)	October 17, 2020
48	23	"A Storm Brewing"; Transliteration: "Arashi no Kehai" (Japanese: 嵐の気配)	October 24, 2020
49	24	"Cinderella's Magic"; Transliteration: "Shinderera no Mahō" (Japanese: シンデレラの魔法)	October 31, 2020
50	25	"…With You Again!"; Transliteration: "Kimi to mata…" (Japanese: キミとまた…)	November 7, 2020

== Music ==
=== Television series ===
Season 1

- Opening (episodes 1-26): "Kokoro e (心絵 -- ココロエ)" by Road of Major (ロードオブメジャ)
- Ending (episodes 1–16): "step" by Beni Arashiro
- Ending (episodes 17–25): "Faraway" by Paradise GO!! GO!!
- Ending (episode 26): "Kokoro e (心絵 -- ココロエ)" by Road of Major

Season 2

- Opening (episodes 27–52): "Saraba Aoki Omokage (さらば碧き面影)" by Road of Major
- Ending (episodes 27–39): "WONDERLAND" by May
- Ending (episodes 40–51): "Shoboi Kao Sunnayo Baby (しょぼい顔すんなよベイベー)" by The Loose Dogs
- Ending (episode 52): "Saraba Aoki Omakage (さらば碧き面影)" by Road of Major

Season 3

- Opening (episodes 53–77): "PLAY THE GAME" by Road of Major
- Ending (episodes 53–67): "Strike Party!!!" by BeForU
- Ending (episodes 68–77): "Yoru ni Nareba" (夜になれば) by The Loose Dogs
- Ending (episode 78): "PLAY THE GAME" by Road of Major

Season 4

- Opening (episode 80–103): "RISE" by Ootomo Kouhei
- Ending (episode 79–95): "ONE DAY" by The Loose Dogs
- Ending (episode 96–103): "Ame nochi niji iro" (雨のち虹色) by The Loose Dogs feat. Maki Oguro and Showtaro Morikubo (Gorō Shigeno)
- Ending (episode 104): "Rise" by Ootomo Kouhei

Season 5

- Opening (episode 106–128): "Hey! Hey! Alright" by SCHA DARA PARR feat. Kaela Kimura
- Ending (episode 105–120): "Stay with me" by Hitomi Shimatani
- Ending (episode 121–128): "Jibun Color" (ジブンカラー) by Yu Nakamura
- Ending (episode 129):"Kokoro e (心絵 -- ココロエ)" by Road of Major

Season 6

- Opening (episode 131–153): "Kokoro e" (心絵—ココロエ) by TRIPLANE
- Ending (episode 130–142): "Twilight Star" (トワイライトスター) by Megamasso
- Ending (episode 143–153): "Zutto Mae Kara (ずっと 前から)" by French Kiss
- Ending (episode 154): "Kokoro e (心絵 -- ココロエ)" by Road of Major

=== Original video animations ===
Message

- Ending: "Kokoro e" (心絵—ココロエ) by Showtaro Morikubo

World Series

- Ending (episode 1–2): "Time capsule" (メインテーマ) by CLUTCHO

=== Major: Yūjō no Winning Shot ===
- Ending: "Tsubasa" by Remioromen

=== Major 2nd ===
2nd Season 1

- Opening (episode 1–13): "Koete Ike" (越えていけ) by Kyūso Nekokami
- Opening (episode 14–25): "Dreamcatcher" (ドリームキャッチャー) by BERRY GOODMAN (ベリーグッドマン)
- Ending (episode 1–13): "Pride" (プライド) by Yū Takahashi
- Ending (episode 14–25): "Sairen" by Reol

2nd Season 2

- Opening (episode 1–13): "Answer" by Leo Ieiri
- Ending (episode 1–13): "One" by SHE'S
- Opening (episode 14-??): "Shiroi Doro" (白い泥) by Mone Kamishiraishi
- Ending (episode 14-??): "Identity" by Ame no Parade
