= The Tower of Druaga (TV series) =

Japanese anime television series

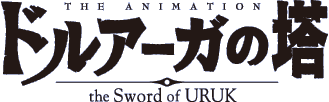

ドルアーガの塔 (Druaga no Tō)
- Created by: Namco Bandai Games
- Anime television series

Tower of Druaga: The Aegis of Uruk
- Directed by: Koichi Chigira
- Produced by: Taichi Hashimoto; Hideyuki Nanba
- Written by: Shoji Gatoh
- Music by: Hitoshi Sakimoto
- Studio: Gonzo
- Licensed by: Crunchyroll (Note: In North America through Crunchyroll, LLC (formerly Funimation).); UK: MVM Entertainment
- Original network: Animax, tvk, KBS, Sun TV, Chiba TV, Tokyo MX, GBS, TV Saitama, GyaO, TVQ
- English network: PH: AXN; SEA: Animax; US: Funimation Channel
- Original run: April 1, 2008 – June 20, 2008
- Episodes: 12
- Anime television series

Tower of Druaga: The Sword of Uruk
- Directed by: Koichi Chigira
- Produced by: Taichi Hashimoto; Hideyuki Nanba
- Written by: Shoji Gatoh
- Music by: Hitoshi Sakimoto
- Studio: Gonzo
- Licensed by: Crunchyroll
- Original network: Animax, TVK, KBS, SUN, Chiba TV, Tokyo MX, GBS, TV Saitama, GyaO, TVQ
- English network: PH: AXN; SEA: Animax; US: Funimation Channel
- Original run: January 8, 2009 – March 26, 2009
- Episodes: 12
- Manga

Doruāga no Tō ~the Aegis of URUK~ Sekigan no Ryū
- Written by: Makoto2
- Published by: Kadokawa Shoten
- Magazine: Comptiq
- Original run: June 10, 2008 – present

The Tower of Druaga: The Aegis of Uruk (Japanese: ドルアーガの塔 〜the Aegis of URUK〜, Hepburn: Doruāga no Tō ~ji Ījisu obu Uruku~) and its sequel, The Tower of Druaga: The Sword of Uruk (ドルアーガの塔 ～the Sword of URUK～, Doruāga no Tō ~za Sōdo obu Uruku~), is a Japanese anime television series, created by Gonzo, and is an animated reboot/continuation of Namco's Babylonian Castle Saga video game franchise which began as an arcade game, The Tower of Druaga, originally released in 1984. This series is amongst the first to be officially broadcast on the internet by Gonzo simultaneously in Japanese and subtitled in English on YouTube, and BOST TV.

== Plot ==
It has been eighty years since King Gilgamesh defeated "the tower" single-handedly (as depicted in the original game, The Tower of Druaga), and now the tower is reborn. The "Summer of Anu" is a season that comes every few years during which the powers of the monsters within the Tower wane thanks to the grace of the great god Anu. Each Summer of Anu, the armies of the Uruk Kingdom secure their strongholds within the Tower, aiming to eventually conquer the upper floors. The story begins with the third Summer of Anu. The city of Meskia is the first stronghold built on the first level of the Tower. In addition to the Uruk Army preparing for their third campaign against Druaga, innumerable adventurers called "climbers" have been drawn to Meskia by rumors of the Blue Crystal Rod, a legendary treasure believed to be hidden on the top floor of the Tower. Jil, a young guardian, has traveled to the tower and Meskia, the last safe stop on the first floor of the tower. The story follows Jil, a new climber who wishes to reach the top floor of the tower. On the top floor is the evil lord Druaga, and numerous monsters and traps inhabit the floors along the way.

The second season, titled The Tower of Druaga: The Sword of Uruk, picks up "half a year after" the events of the first season. With Druaga's guardian defeated, the monsters of the tower have disappeared and a period of peace and prosperity have descended upon the people. Jil and Fatina, having survived the tower's collapse, attempt to move on with their lives while still coming to terms with Neeba and Kaaya's betrayal. This all changes when they rescue a mysterious girl from a group of soldiers. They learn that this young girl, Ki, may be the key to unlocking a great secret within the tower. Armed with this knowledge and haunted by a troubling vision of the future, Jil once again prepares to climb the tower.

== Anime ==
The Tower of Druaga was broadcast on Animax from April 1, 2008, to March 26, 2009. It was later broadcast by other Japanese television networks such as tvk, KBS, Sun TV, Chiba TV, Tokyo MX, GBS, TV Saitama, GyaO, TVQ. The anime was produced by Gonzo. It was directed by Koichi Chigira. The chief screenwriter for the series was Shoji Gatoh. Hitoshi Sakimoto was the composer for the music heard in the anime, with Eminence Symphony Orchestra playing the pieces created by Sakimoto specifically for The Aegis of Uruk. From episodes 1–12, the opening theme is "Swinging" by Muramasa☆ while the ending theme is "Tōchōshatachi" (塔頂者たち) by Kenn. Episodes 13–24, the opening theme is "Questions?" by Yu Nakamura while the ending themes are "Mahōtsukai Desu Kedo" (魔法使いですけど, Am I The Witch?) by Fumiko Orikasa and "Swinging" by Muramasa☆. In 2009, Funimation acquired a license for the series.

== Characters ==
=== The Tower of Druaga ===
These are characters from The Tower of Druaga, the 1984 game on which the rest of the series is based.

- Gilgamesh (ギルガメッシュ, Girugamesshu), also known as Gil, is the destined hero of the game. He has been charged by the goddess Ishtar to ascend the Tower of Druaga and rescue the maiden Ki from the demon Druaga. Not only must Gil use his sword and shield to navigate through the labyrinthine floors of the tower, he must use his wit and memory to reveal the locations of the treasures contained on each floor, some of which are necessary for Gil's success. Gil is patterned after the Gilgamesh of Sumerian literature. Gil was also absent in the game The Quest of Ki, produced in 1988.
- Ki (カイ, Kai) is a priestess in her own right. She has been captured and rendered powerless by the demon Druaga. He has turned her into a stone in order to lure the greatest warrior in Ishtar's realm into his trap. Ki goes on to be a tremendous asset in Gil's future adventures, but first she must be rescued from Druaga's grasp.
- Ishtar (イシター, Ishitā), based on the goddess of love by the same name, assigns Ki to retrieve the Blue Crystal Rod. She is unable to meddle directly in the affairs of mortals on earth, but can only sit by helplessly and watch as Gil answers her call to service. Once she charges Gil with her instructions, the rest is in Gil's hands, but Ishtar will return to aid the reunited duo another time. After Ki is captured, Ishtar tells Gil to save Ki. In the PC engine remake, she gives hints to the player about retrieving the treasures. Despite her kind and compassionate behavior in the earlier games, Ishtar was portrayed as bossy and harsh in the 2004 game The Nightmare of Druaga.
- Druaga (ドルアーガ, Doruāga) is the demon that resides in the Tower of Druaga. He is portrayed as a huge, green monster with eight arms, four legs, and yellow eyes. He will eventually be defeated by Gil. He has hidden the Blue Crystal Rod and kidnapped Ki in order to lure Ishtar's greatest instruments of good into his trap so he can dispose of them forever, and lay claim to the world. In order for Druaga's plan to succeed, Gil must die. If Gil would survive by climbing through all 60 monster ridden floors of the tower, he must face Druaga himself. Without the proper equipment and enhancements, Gil will be no match for Druaga's brutal destructive strength.
- Succubus (サキュバス, Sakyubasu) is a demon that resides in the tower. She disguised herself as the goddess Ishtar and guarded the Blue Crystal Rod to prevent Gil from being able to defeat Druaga, but when Gil encountered her, after a debate, she relinquished the Blue Crystal Rod.

=== The Tower of Druaga anime ===
This section entails characters who appear in the anime series Tower of Druaga.

==== Jil ====
Voiced by: KENN (Japanese); Todd Haberkorn (English)

The protagonist of the series, Jil is a young adventurer who dreams of reaching the top of the Tower of Druaga. He is strong willed, determined and has deep fantasies about being a revered champion. He is a defensive class: Guardian and initially uses a shield with a protractable spike in one hand and any makeshift weapon he could find in the other (usually a stick). Along with his original shield, he later uses one of the two swords used by King Gilgamesh, which the King entrusted to Kaaya to pass on to him. The name "Jil" is likely a reference/tribute to the alternate shorter name for Gilgamesh; Jil also seems to resemble a young Gilgamesh as seen in Gilgamesh's flashback in episode three. Despite being an inexperienced Climber, Jil is nonetheless a decent fighter and after joining Kaaya and Ahmey's party, he does his best to support the group in combat. One of his attributes is that he possesses a physical resilience of ridiculous proportions, at one point taking a heavy beating from a crowd in episode two, and remaining standing throughout, despite numerous heavy blows to his head, some of which he failed to notice. Jil and Kaaya are seen together holding hands at the end of the credits.

==== Kaaya ====
Voiced by: Fumiko Orikasa (Japanese); Trina Nishimura (English)

Kaaya is an oracle who specializes in defensive and healing spells. She meets Jil after he injures himself fighting a group of Climbers, and she takes him to her house and heals his wounds. He later joins her and Ahmey's climber party. She uses a long wand which requires her to place small runes into a slot at the top and recite various chants to perform certain spells. She is a descendant of Ki, who aided Gilgamesh in his battle against Druaga. Kaaya and Jil are seen together holding hands at the end of the credits.

==== Ahmey ====
Voiced by: Risa Hayamizu (Japanese); Brina Palencia (English)

Ahmey is a warrior lancer, and the first person Kaaya recruits for her climber party. She exhibits a quiet and stoic attitude most of the time, and often appears to be uncomfortable when forced to speak. Despite her initial reticence, Ahmey later reveals a more feminine and naive side to her companions. As the most experienced member of the group, having traveled the furthest in the tower, she tends to act as a leader of sorts, as well as explaining the system and design of the Tower. In combat she uses a lance which has a drill bit, rather than a simple blade, as the point. Ahmey is implied to have once been a high-ranking officer in the army. What caused her to leave is never discussed. Ahmey is killed while fighting Druaga.

==== Melt ====
Voiced by: Hozumi Goda (Japanese); Chuck Huber (English)

A mage from a wealthy family, Melt has fallen into debt and exile, largely due, apparently, to his spendthrift ways; the only sign of his wealth that really remains are his titles and his servant, Coopa. He claims to be climbing the tower in order to use the Blue Crystal Rod to restore his status, surround himself with women, destroy all the things he finds unpleasant, and various other self-satisfying desires. In combat, Melt utilizes lightning-based spells using a variety of rods. He casts spells by utilizing chants of various lengths, and launches the attack by swinging the rod in a golf-like fashion. Furthering the golf comparison, each of his rods are numbered, and are carried by Coopa who acts as a "caddy" of sorts. Melt is far less competent than he tries to appear. He often calls for the wrong rod whereby Coopa secretly hands him the correct one. He also likes to think that he is a connoisseur, but is constantly unaware of the foods he claims to hate being present in Coopa's cooking.

==== Coopa ====
Voiced by: Minori Chihara (Japanese); Monica Rial (English)

Melt's retainer who has a very enthusiastic personality. She is ten years old. Coopa has little direct relation to combat, more often utilizing her domestic abilities to support the party by providing them with nutritional meals made from a combination of rations and monster meat. While she tends to announce the contents of the meals she makes, she makes no effort to hide what she uses if asked. In and out of combat, Coopa is shown to have enormous strength for her stature. In episode 11 she is seen carrying Melt's rods and piggybacking an injured Utu.

==== Neeba ====
Voiced by: Takahiro Sakurai (Japanese); Travis Willingham (English)

Jil's half brother, he is a skilled archer and also known as "Neeba the Dragon Slayer". Neeba is far more serious and competent than Jil is, and has little-to-no faith in his brother's potential as a climber. He has the most knowledge of the tower out of any of the main characters. He doesn't hesitate for a second about using his friends to do what he wants. In season 1, episode 12, it is revealed that Neeba's true goal was to enter the Tower of Fantasy, which could only be opened after defeating the Druaga guardian. He blatantly confesses to manipulating his comrades loyalties to achieve his goals.

==== Fatina ====
Voiced by: Yui Horie (Japanese); Jamie Marchi (English)

The only female member of Neeba's party, she is a proud magician. She admires Neeba, and has confessed to Jil that she wants to become Neeba's girlfriend, but Neeba's feelings towards her are unclear. Like Melt, she became a climber largely from a desire for personal profit, intending to use the power of the Blue Crystal Rod to become rich. Her purse has a strap made of an expensive leather that she carries as a reminder of her goal (she informs Jil she wanted a belt of it, but could not afford it). In combat, she appears to use fire magic, utilizing a cannon-like staff weapon to cast spells. At episode 12 she is betrayed by Neeba and she is saved by Jil during the whirlpool incident in which they are the only known survivors. At the beginning of season 2 she is living with Jil as they both attempt to make new lives for themselves following the destruction of Druaga. During the second season she falls for Jil but realizes that in his heart he still loves Kaaya.

==== Kally ====
Voiced by: Akira Ishida (Japanese); Justin Pate (English)

The scout of the group, he possesses street smarts and ninja-like ability, using throwing knives as his preferred weapon. It is revealed that he became a climber in order to help his impoverished home town, but after discovering the secret of Pazuzu's caskets, he is killed by Pazuzu.

==== Utu ====
Voiced by: Hiroki Yasumoto (Japanese); Kent Williams (English)

Encased in armor, he is the main attacker of the group, and he wields a battle axe. In season one Utu's face remained either covered by his helmet or otherwise obscured. After the start of season two he is found to be working as a professional wrestler and his face is revealed, a comic point as no one knew what he looked like. In episode one, Jil cannot remember his name. In episode nine when the group becomes separated from a great fall from a bridge, he travels with Kally and Coopa, but becomes separated from Kally when protecting Coopa; though while not present at his comrade's death, he is aware of his fate and informs the rest of his group.

==== Pazuzu ====
Voiced by: Masahiko Tanaka (Japanese); Barry Yandell (English)

An evil mage who kills Kally, his motivation for entering the Tower is to kill the King Gilgamesh, as revealed at the end of Aegis of Uruk. He carries with him several coffins with contents unknown throughout the first season. He is eventually killed by Neeba, who shoots Pazuzu in the head and heart before he is able to summon the unknown soldiers from his coffins (which have since been revealed to be four robot assassins). Those soldiers may be somehow related to the dream sequence Jil had and they could be the personal guardians of Druaga himself. It is later revealed that Pazuzu is Henaro's father.

==== Kelb ====
Voiced by: Takaya Kuroda (Japanese); J. Michael Tatum (English)

The leader of Royal Army, Kelb leads the King's army into the Tower to eradicate the monsters and Druaga. While he initially looks down on Jil and the Climbers, Kelb comes to realize that the Royal Army lacks the ability to defeat Druaga and survive the dangers of the Tower. He was once Ahmey's mentor. In the end credits he is shown to be marrying Ethana.

==== Ethana ====
Voiced by: Risa Mizuno (Japanese); Colleen Clinkenbeard (English)

A lieutenant in the Royal Army, Ethana loyally serves Kelb, but she is somewhat more open minded toward Jil and the Climbers and supports Jil's quest by providing him a bag of gold in hopes of recruiting more Climbers. She is shown to have survived the waterfall from the first season and continues to serve in the royal army. Though she appears obedient in the presence of Amina and the King's advisors, Ethana secretly has doubts concerning King Gilgamesh's condition and ability to continue ruling Uruk. In the end credits she is shown to be marrying Kelb.

==== Dark Knight ====
Voiced by: Takaya Kuroda (Japanese), Christopher Sabat (English)

An obstacle met on the way to the tower, he appears only in Jil's dream, and is quickly defeated.

==== The Three Knights of Druaga ====
Blue Knight of the Azure Knight Voiced by: Keiichi Sonobe, Mirror Knight of the Silver Knight Voiced by: Kimiyoshi Kibe, Hyper Knight of the Elite Knight Voiced by: Takaya Kuroda, and Red Knight of the Crimson Knight Voiced by: Seirou Ohgino (Japanese); Micah Solusod (English)

The Three Knights of Druaga are the most loyal and strongest of Lord Druaga's minions (although they claimed to be three but there are actually four of them) but eventually they are defeated and annihilated by Jil with a single blow. They only appear in Jil's dream in the beginning episode of The Aegis of Uruk, though the knights' first names are the name of the armors in "The Sword of Uruk". The actual knights were once the Dark Armour of the Sumar Empire and were used to create Pazuzu's four Coffin Knights.

==== Gilgamesh ====
Voiced by: Takaya Hashi (Japanese); Charlie Campbell (English)

The great hero who once defeated Druaga, Gilgamesh now rules as king. In the past, he survived an assassination attempt that apparently Jil tried to foil in vain. He entrusts Kaaya with the mission of climbing the Tower of Druaga; in Sword of Uruk, it is revealed that Kaaya is his great-granddaughter, Ishara, and he had hoped that as a descendant of himself and Ki, Kaaya would have the power to kill his shadow. Despite his benevolence in the past, he is slowly becoming more and more erratic.

==== Shadow of Gilgamesh ====
Voiced by: Tomokazu Seki (Japanese); Josh Grelle (English)

The dark side of Gilgamesh's personality, which harbors all of the repressed desires and hopes of his person. The shadow is a malignant narcissist who aims to destroy the gods and realize his inner image of himself as a supreme being. His appearance is youthful, as befits his narcissistic self-image. Although physically created by Druaga's curse, as a means of ensnaring Gil into Succubus' plot to destroy the gods, the shadow's mind is in fact a perfect reflection of Gil's own and an expression of his own inner rage at being denied the life he wanted to live. Its malignantly narcissistic beliefs are held in compensation for Gil's own sense of personal vulnerability before the requirements of social duty, the same which have denied him the opportunity to live as he wanted.

==== Ki ====
Voiced by: Akiko Yajima (Japanese); Leah Clark (English)

A spirit of the Tower who resembles Kaaya, Ki was once the first priestess of Ishtar and knew Gilgamesh when he first fought and defeated Druaga. Her spirit appears to Jil when she saves him during his quest to acquire the stone tablet for Kaaya and reveals that Jil will be faced with three betrayals. She recognizes a connection between Gilgamesh and Jil, but has revealed little else regarding herself and the nature of Gilgamesh and the Tower. In the Tower, she is able to appear as a child, a young woman, and an adult.

==== Succubus ====
Voiced by: Yukana (Japanese); Carrie Savage (English)

A spirit of the Tower who has haunted Neeba since he freed her. Neeba is the only one who can see her unless she wills herself to be seen by others, and she taunts Neeba throughout his journey. He also reveals that the Succubus and Druaga were once lovers, though the Succubus claims that Druaga is no longer the man she knew. She appears with Ki as they both observe the progress of the Climbers. Though few of the climbers are aware of her presence, the Succubus is legendary as a witch and she and Ki have the power to interfere with the Tower's system.

==== Druaga ====
Voiced by: Jouji Nakata (Japanese); Chris Cason (English)

The evil god who terrorizes the people in the Tower, defeating him will reveal the Blue Crystal Rod. He was defeated by Gilgamesh before the events of Aegis of Uruk, but his spirit continues to terrorize the tower and is terrifyingly powerful. Jil and combined efforts of the remaining Climbers manage to successfully defeat Druaga, but the Blue Crystal Rod turns out to only be a key that allows access to a second Tower. After Druaga is defeated at the end of Aegis of Uruk, he continues to reappear each time climbers reach the top level of the lower Tower. Druaga is considerably weaker than before and his defeat yields the key to the Upper Tower.

==== The Female Climbers ====
Alla Voiced by: Eri Nogami (Japanese); Alexis Tipton (English)
Enre Voiced by: Miho Miyagawa (Japanese); Tia Ballard (English)
Iriri Voiced by: Aki Kanada (Japanese); Stephanie Young (English)
Oro Voiced by: Risa Mizuno (Japanese); Kristi Kang (English)
Uo Roo Voiced by: Taka Fujimori (Japanese); Cherami Leigh (English)

Girls from a group of female climbers who originally tried to ascend the Tower of Druaga after Kaaya, Melt, Coopa, and Ahmey convince other climbers to ascend after Jil realizes defeating Druaga will require more climbers. The group originally believes that climbing the Tower and obtaining the Blue Crystal Rod would make them more beautiful, but they are not among the climbers who are trapped after the third Summer of Anu ends. Among them, Ahra (red hair) is an Oracle, Iriri (blonde hair) is a Guardian, Enre (glasses) is a lancer, Uo-Roo (hair-buns) is an archer, and Oro (blue hair) is an ice mage.

==== Nakia ====
Voiced by: Yu Nakamura (Japanese); Aaron Dismuke (English)

A soldier who serves under Ethana and acts as her messenger. He participates in the revolt led by Ethana against King Gilgamesh.

==== Henaro ====
Voiced by: Kana Hanazawa (Japanese); Brittney Karbowski (English)

A druid who frequently dines at Kelb's tavern, she is seemingly forced by circumstance to join Jil, Utu, and Fatina during the second ascent of the Tower. Her weapon is a crossbow-like device that enables her to cast support related magic with magical bolts and also carries around a talisman in the shape of a rod that enables her to control the Coffin Knights. Though she initially appears as their ally, she admits to being a spy for Amina and she has been assigned to recover the four missing knights from Pazuzu's coffins and protect the king's shadow. She is revealed to be Pazuzu's daughter and is addressed by her father as Hecate. Ultimately, she joins the others in the fight against the shadow. Henaro is killed by Neeba shortly after the battle with Gilgamesh.

==== Uragon ====
Voiced by: Toshiyuki Morikawa (Japanese); Robert McCollum (English)

The leader of the Golden Knights, though not incredibly competent and accepts orders without question. He is a loyal subordinate of Amina and, as per her orders, pursues Jil in order to capture Ki. He appears arrogant and ruthless, going as far as destroying buildings of commoners to find Ki and holding Coopa hostage to ensure Melt's cooperation, but actually has a good heart and is somewhat lonely. As he continues to ascend the Tower blindly, Uragon eventually ends up caring for Mite the Fool, who follows him faithfully, but Uragon's uncertainty as to his own reasons for ascending the Tower eventually result in Uragon and, by extension, Mite the Fool, choosing to side with Gilgamesh. When Gilgamesh kills Mite the Fool, Uragon is grief-stricken and impales Gilgamesh from behind just as Gilgamesh tries to deliver a finishing blow to Jil. He is tossed aside and later seen being carried outside of the Tower by Coopa when the Climbers are all ejected. In the end, he is seen kneeling at a grave he erected for Mite at the seminary with a multitude of children, turning a new leaf in his life.

==== Kum ====
Voiced by: Ōki Sugiyama (Japanese); Chris Patton (English)

A member of the Golden Knights and a follower of Uragon. Unlike Uragon, he does not believe the propaganda spread by King Gilgamesh's advisors that Gilgamesh was the one who defeated Druaga, since Kum had been a Climber and witnessed Jil's climb of the Tower of Druaga. While loyal, he eventually chooses to remain in the floor containing an illusory version of his dead sister. Since the other Golden Knights who had accompanied Uragon had been wiped out on the previous floor, Uragon is left to continue ascend the tower with only Might the Fool to accompany him. In the epilogue, one of the climbers accompanying Fatina and Utu is wearing gold armor and could possibly be Kum as he was a survivor of the Golden Knights.

==== Gremica ====
Voiced by: Michiko Neya (Japanese); Clarine Harp (English)

The leader of a group that hopes to revive the lost Sumar Empire, Gremica is a distant relative of Neeba and Jil and was once Neeba's teacher. She ascends the Tower in hopes of capturing Ki, who Gremica believes will be key to her goals. During her ascension, she eventually confronts Neeba and reveals that he turned against her faction and stole the Arrows of the Void that aided the defeat of Druaga. Gremica eventually suggests an alliance with Jil and his friends in order to stop Neeba and the Succubus from taking control of the Tower, but she quickly abandons them to find Neeba, though is forced to leave the Tower when he takes control of the Tower. In Meskia, she reveals to Jil that Neeba is controlling the Tower at the Shrine of Iron and leaves to deal with her former apprentice. When Jil arrives to confront his brother, Neeba has killed Gremica.

==== Acra ====
Voiced by: Kazato Tomizawa (Japanese); Alison Viktorin (English)

Gremica's assistant, a skilled mage who accompanies Gremica as she ascends the tower in pursuit of Neeba and Ki. She is killed by Neeba when Gremica confronts him and reveals the existence of the Succubus.

==== The Coffin Knights ====
Mite the Fool Voiced by: Chiwa Saito (Japanese); Luci Christian (English)
Sword of Blood Voiced by: Isshin Chiba (Japanese); Scott Freeman (English)
Tear of Ice Voiced by: Saori Yumiba (Japanese); Caitlin Glass (English)
Specula Ex Machina Voiced by: Sayuri Hara (Japanese); Newton Pittman / Jessica Foster (English)

The four knights released from the coffins that Pazuzu attempted to keep hidden throughout Aegis of Uruk. Without Pazuzu, they have awakened and now roam the Tower without a master, attacking various climbers as they see fit. Gremica reveals that they are magical machines, created from the Dark Armour formerly used by the Sumar Empire (Red Knight, Blue Knight, Mirror Knight, and Hyper Knight) and their individual characteristics likely carried over. Henaro's motivation for climbing the tower is to recover the four knights by the orders of Amina and protect the king's shadow.

==== Amina ====
Voiced by: Atsuko Tanaka (Japanese); Wendy Powell (English)

A general to King Gilgamesh, she is a corpulent woman who takes advantage of Gilgamesh's increasing instability to maintain her power in Meskia along with Gilgamesh's other advisors. As such, she orders Henaro to recover Pazuzu's four missing knights and encourages propaganda that portrays Gilgamesh as a noble hero, even as war and rebellion become imminent as a result of Gilgamesh's erratic actions. When King Gilgamesh learns from his shadow that Kaaya has been captured, Gilgamesh kills Amina in a fit of rage after Amina reveals that she intended to stop his shadow from being killed in order to ensure Uruk would continue to have a strong immortal king.

==== Shiera ====
Voiced by: Saori Yumiba

A lightning mage and retainer of Amina, who witnesses Gilgamesh's slaying of Amina. With Amina's death, Shiera appears to take her superior's place in observing and dealing with the revolt led by Ethana. Kelb's arrival, along with considerably powerful reinforcements, force Shiera and the Royal Army to retreat while Kelb's forces along with the rebels led by Ethana storm the palace to confront King Gilgamesh, after they made her a prisoner. She is later seen unchained at Kelb's tavern.

== See also ==
- List of anime based on video games
- Tower of Babel
- Tower of God
