= Designing Women season 7 =

Designing Women
- Season 7
- DVD cover
- Starring: Dixie Carter; Annie Potts; Jan Hooks; Judith Ivey; Meshach Taylor
- No. of episodes: 22

Release
- Original network: CBS
- Original release: September 25, 1992 – May 24, 1993

Season chronology
- ← Previous; Season 6

The seventh and final season of Designing Women premiered on CBS on September 25, 1992, and concluded on May 24, 1993. The season consisted of 22 episodes. Created by Linda Bloodworth-Thomason, the series was produced by Bloodworth/Thomason Mozark Productions in association with Columbia Pictures Television.

== Cast ==
=== Main cast ===
- Dixie Carter as Julia Sugarbaker
- Annie Potts as Mary Jo Shively
- Jan Hooks as Carlene Frazier-Dobber
- Judith Ivey as Bonnie Jean "BJ" Poteet
- Meshach Taylor as Anthony Bouvier

=== Recurring cast ===
- Ray McKinnon as Dwayne Dobber
- Alice Ghostley as Bernice Clifton
- Sheryl Lee Ralph as Etienne Toussant Bouvier
- Patrick Warburton as Craig Coleman

=== Guest cast ===
- James Naughton as Phillip Russell Stuart
- Clyde Kusatsu as Lewis
- Della Reese as Mrs. Toussant
- Sherman Hemsley as Mr. Toussant
- Beah Richards as Mrs. Bouvier
- Marius Weyers as Nigel McFeeney
- Peri Gilpin as Jade Henson
- Ron Glass as Michael "Punch" Alexander
- Pat Carroll as Mrs. Beecham
- Greg Kean as Eric Hobart
- James Karen as Kearney
- Gail O'Grady as Kiki Kearney

== Episodes ==
No. overall	No. in season	Title	Directed by	Written by	Original release date	U.S. viewers (millions)
142	1	"Of Human Bondage"	David Steinberg	Linda Bloodworth-Thomason	September 25, 1992	18.0
After Allison leaves Sugarbaker's, Julia needs cash but is refused a bank loan. To cheer themselves up, the women play poker with a wealthy client, who wins the business from them. Sugarbaker's could use an infusion of cash, and at a rowdy party given by potential new client B.J. Poteet, the gals kick up their heels in wild abandon. Note: For the final season the show no longer has an opening credit sequence, instead displaying the actors' names over the beginning of the actual episode. The title of each episode is no longer displayed on screen as well.
143	2	"Sex and the Single Woman"	David Steinberg	Dee LaDuke & Mark Alton Brown	October 2, 1992	14.7
Carlene spends the night with her visiting ex-husband, then admits she was just using him for sex.
144	3	"Mary Jo vs. the Terminator"	David Steinberg	Dee LaDuke & Mark Alton Brown	October 16, 1992	15.5
After Mary Jo asks Julia to proofread a letter for her, Julia completely rewrites it, annoying Mary Jo. Mary Jo ends up telling off know-it-all Julia just before the two are about to appear in at a fashion show, leading to disastrous results. B.J. expresses her thoughts on a series of billboards, one of which angers vegetarians.
145	4	"On the Road Again"	David Steinberg	Dee LaDuke & Mark Alton Brown	October 23, 1992	15.3
In an attempt at spontaneity, a carefree Mary Jo takes off for Nashville for "a hen party on wheels" with Julia and Bernice, but they become terrified when a trucker that Bernice flirted with at a diner pursues them. Meanwhile, back at the office, Carlene and Anthony put their noses to the grindstone studying for midterms.
146	5	"Screaming Passages"	David Steinberg	Norma Safford Vela	October 30, 1992	13.8
Julia finds herself in the "biological twilight zone" of menopause just as she is about to embark on a new relationship with a handsome symphony conductor.
147	6	"Viva Las Vegas"	Charles Frank	Linda Bloodworth-Thomason	November 6, 1992	13.6
After Vanessa calls off their wedding, Anthony joins the gang on a getaway to Las Vegas, where he nurses his broken heart in the company of a show stopping showgirl whom he impulsively weds.
148	7	"Fools Rush In"	David Steinberg	Linda Jean LaBrown	November 13, 1992	16.0
B.J. offers to help Anthony out of his predicament after he awakens to discover he's married to Las Vegas showgirl, Etienne.
149	8	"Love Letters"	David Steinberg	Norma Safford Vela	November 20, 1992	14.7
A steamy love letter from another woman is found in James' safe-deposit box and shatters B.J.'s image of her late husband as a faithful companion worthy of her trust, but the letter that her late husband's faithful companion was 36 years old. Meanwhile, reveling in the destruction of her old car which a symbol of her days as a suburban housewife, Mary Jo goes wild in a new red convertible.
150	9	"The Vision Thing"	David Steinberg	Norma Safford Vela	December 4, 1992	13.5
Etienne drives Anthony crazy trying to be the perfect wife.
151	10	"Trial and Error"	David Steinberg	Danny Margosis & Robert Horn	December 11, 1992	12.5
Law student Anthony helps Mary Jo in court in a case involving her defective freezer.
152	11	"Too Dumb to Date"	David Steinberg	Jeannie Elias	January 8, 1993	14.6
Mary Jo dates a handsome idiot, a to-die-for toyboy male model who seems to have few toys in the attic and little in common with her.
153	12	"The Odyssey"	David Steinberg	Dee LaDuke & Mark Alton Brown	January 15, 1993	14.0
B.J.'s contribution to the Democratic Party gets the Sugarbaker crew invited to the Inaugural Ball, but the trip proves to be a party for no one—even Julia, who struggles to maintain a cheery disposition in the face of disaster—as bad weather forces a change in plans.
154	13	"Oh Dog, Poor Dog"	David Steinberg	Cathryn Michon	January 22, 1993	12.4
After eye surgery, Bernice overhears the gals talk of putting Mary Jo's dog out of its misery and figures they're planning her own mercy killing, so she barricades herself inside the storeroom. Meanwhile, Julia gets caught listening to a London phone line which plays tapes of Princess Diana's private conversations with her boyfriend.
155	14	"Wedding Redux"	David Steinberg	Mimi Pond	February 5, 1993	14.0
Anthony and Etienne renew their vows for Etienne's visiting parents and Anthony's grandmother at a ceremony at B.J.'s, where anything that could go wrong does.
156	15	"Nude Julia, New York Morning"	David Steinberg	Emily Levine	February 12, 1993	15.9
While attending a gallery art show of a former teacher of Julia's, Mary Jo, Anthony, Carlene, B.J. and Julia discover a nude painting on display that he painted of Julia.
157	16	"Sex, Lies and Bad Hair Days"	David Steinberg	Danny Margosis & Robert Horn	March 5, 1993	11.9
B.J.'s dating adventures take a turn for the worse on her birthday, when a bad-hair day and two miserable blind dates have her vowing to give up men, so Julia tries to cheer her up by getting her a date with a really nice fellow.
158	17	"Shovel Off to Buffalo"	David Steinberg	Emily Levine	March 12, 1993	13.7
When the face of Elvis appears on her snow shovel, Mary Jo wants to get rid of it. Her neighbor sees it and when she tries to convince him it's just a coincidence, he regains his hearing and believes she is a miracle worker. At the end of the episode the face on the shovel mysteriously disappears.
159	18	"It's Not So Easy Being Green"	David Steinberg	Emily Levine	April 2, 1993	14.0
When Etienne's successful writer friend visits, Anthony is jealous of the vivid past he shares with her. He tries to be gracious by throwing a signing party for him.
160	19	"The Woman Who Came to Sugarbakers"	David Steinberg	Emily Levine	April 30, 1993	8.7
Julia's overbearing former school mistress visits and annoys everyone at Sugarbaker's. After Julia tells them she is only there because of ghostly instructions from her dead husband telling her to "Go to Julia", they decide to have a seance to try to force her to leave.
161	20	"The Lying Game"	David Steinberg	Danny Margosis & Robert Horn	May 7, 1993	8.9
Carlene is confused by her new beau Eric's unusual habit of cross-dressing. To try to understand him, she begins cross-dressing.
162	21	"Gone with a Whim"	David Steinberg	Danny Margosis & Robert Horn and David Steinberg	May 24, 1993	18.9
163	22	"Gone with a Whim"	David Steinberg	Danny Margosis & Robert Horn and David Steinberg	May 24, 1993	18.9
With Sugarbaker's in such bad financial shape, the ladies are grateful when B.J. gets them a job redecorating a house that resembles the great home from Gone with the Wind—until they find out that the new lady of the house plans to rip out the grand staircase and replace it with an escalator. To make matters worse, B.J. finds out that their client is trying to take over Poteet Industries and plans to give Sugarbaker's to his young bride Kiki—renaming it "Kikibaker's". With Julia continuing to fight to save the antebellum Kearney mansion, B.J. struggles to save Sugarbaker's and Poteet Industries from a takeover from the Kearneys. However, despite their efforts, Kiki Kearney announces her new plans for "Kikibaker's", Lester Kearney announces that the purchase of Poteet Industries is complete, and the modernizing of the mansion gets underway. Anthony and the women are fired for insubordination. Craig, a friend of Mary Jo's, stumbles on some embarrassing news about the Kearneys' illegal financial activities; Poteet Industries and Sugarbaker's are saved from the takeover.

== DVD release ==
The seventh and final season was released on DVD by Shout! Factory on July 17, 2012.
