= Designing Women season 6 =

Designing Women
- Season 6
- DVD cover
- Starring: Dixie Carter; Annie Potts; Julia Duffy; Jan Hooks; Meshach Taylor
- No. of episodes: 23

Release
- Original network: CBS
- Original release: September 16, 1991 – May 4, 1992

Season chronology
- ← Previous; Season 5 Next → Season 7

The sixth season of Designing Women premiered on CBS on September 16, 1991, and concluded on May 4, 1992. The season consisted of 23 episodes. Created by Linda Bloodworth-Thomason, the series was produced by Bloodworth/Thomason Mozark Productions in association with Columbia Pictures Television.

== Cast ==
=== Main cast ===
- Dixie Carter as Julia Sugarbaker
- Annie Potts as Mary Jo Shively
- Julia Duffy as Allison Sugarbaker
- Jan Hooks as Carlene Frazier-Dobber
- Meshach Taylor as Anthony Bouvier

=== Recurring cast ===
- Michael Goldfinger as Rusty
- Ray McKinnon as Dwayne Dobber
- Alice Ghostley as Bernice Clifton
- Brian Lando as Quinton Shively
- George Newbern as Payne McIlroy

=== Guest cast ===
- Jean Smart as Charlene Frazier-Stillfield
- Charles Frank as Mark Boswell
- Jerry Lacy as Barry Binsford
- Marla Maples as Herself
- M. C. Gainey as T. Tommy Reed
- Blake Clark as Skip Jackson
- Ian Patrick Williams as Charles Tremain
- Kristina Wayborn as Gail
- Charles Levin as Simba
- Doug Ballard as Davis Gillette
- Tino Insana as Shamu
- William Morgan Sheppard as Professor Burton
- Jackie Joseph as Darla Jackson
- Gretchen Wyler as Ivy McBride
- Lisa Jane Persky as Heather
- Charles Nelson Reilly as Himself
- Gary Morris as Dr. Dan Hacker
- Jackée Harry as Vanessa Chamberlain

== Episodes ==
| No. overall | No. in season | Title | Directed by | Written by | Original release date | U.S. viewers (millions) |
|---|---|---|---|---|---|---|
| 119 | 1 | "The Big Desk" | Harry Thomason | Linda Bloodworth-Thomason | September 16, 1991 | 30.1 |
| 120 | 2 | "The Big Desk" | Harry Thomason | Linda Bloodworth-Thomason | September 16, 1991 | 30.1 |
It is revealed that Suzanne has moved to Japan (as Delta Burke has left the series). Carlene, Charlene's sister, is introduced as well as Julia's cousin Allison who bought out Suzanne's share of Sugarbaker's. Much to everyone's dismay, Allison has an enormous desk delivered to Sugarbaker's before she arrives on scene, where she quickly annoys everyone at Sugarbaker's. Hilarity ensues when a male stripper arrives at the office for Julia's birthday only to accidentally strip for Allison. Sugarbaker cousin and new not-so-silent partner Allison tries to take charge of Sugarbaker's, and Julia is not too thrilled. Also, Charlene's younger sister Carlene arrives and reveals she's divorcing her husband. Anthony and Allison fight over ownership of Suzanne's house. Note: This is Jean Smart's final appearance in the series.
| 121 | 3 | "A Toe in the Water" | David Steinberg | Pam Norris | September 23, 1991 | 27.1 |
Julia thinks she's ready to resume dating, but Alison disagrees, questioning the manliness of Julia's new beau. Meanwhile, Allison and Anthony continue to bicker about who owns Suzanne's house, until Anthony obtains an affidavit asserting his right to occupy the house — and allows Allison to stay on only as his personal servant.
| 122 | 4 | "Dwayne's World" | David Steinberg | Paul Clay & Pam Norris | September 30, 1991 | 25.9 |
Mary Jo protectively takes divorcee Carlene under her wing — going overboard with a lie about Carlene's latest flame — when ex-hubby Dwayne shows up to sweep Carlene off her feet again.
| 123 | 5 | "Marriage Most Foul" | David Steinberg | Dee LaDuke & Mark Alton Brown | October 7, 1991 | 25.6 |
When Allison's ex-convict former flame (whom she turned in for insider trading) is released, she fears he is plotting revenge; instead, he proposes to her.
| 124 | 6 | "Picking a Winner" | Asaad Kelada | Dee LaDuke & Mark Alton Brown | October 14, 1991 | 24.4 |
Mary Jo turns to a sperm bank to get pregnant, prompting mixed reactions at work. Meanwhile, Julia threatens to rip the draperies from the windows of the home of a wealthy client whose payment is overdue.
| 125 | 7 | "Last Tango in Atlanta" | Charles Frank | Thom Bray and Michael Ross | October 21, 1991 | 21.2 |
Allison gets a bad hairdo from a ponytailed stylist. The women help out at an outreach program at Anthony's old prison and are stuck in a room with T-Tommy Reed during a prison riot. He takes a liking to Allison and makes her feel better about her hairdo. After the women leave the jail, Allison receives a package from T-Tommy with the stylist's ponytail in it.
| 126 | 8 | "The Strange Case of Clarence and Anita" | David Steinberg | Linda Bloodworth-Thomason | November 4, 1991 | 23.8 |
The Sugarbaker women take sides on the controversial confirmation hearings of U.S. Supreme Court nominee Clarence Thomas and Anita Hill's accusation of sexual harassment: Mary Jo and Julia side with Hill and Allison with Thomas. Conflict spills over into Allison's birthday party, where Mary Jo and Julia turn up in costume (they'd appeared in a stage production of What Ever Happened to Baby Jane?) just in time to hear a television interview about the hearings with Allison.
| 127 | 9 | "Just Say Doe" | David Steinberg | Andrea Carla Michaels | November 11, 1991 | 24.3 |
When Mary Jo's womanizing brother Skip visits, falls for Allison, and takes her and Quinton on a deer-hunting trip, the women secretly tag along.
| 128 | 10 | "Julia and Rusty, Sittin' in a Tree" | David Steinberg | Thom Bray & Michael A. Ross | November 18, 1991 | 24.2 |
Julia is pressured into a second date with Rusty and ends up setting up Mary Jo with one of Rusty's friends. Carlene and Allison go out with some junior-college guys. Anthony tags along to the drive-in with Bernice to keep an eye on things.
| 129 | 11 | "Julia and Mary Jo Get Stuck Under a Bed" | David Steinberg | Linda Bloodworth-Thomason | December 2, 1991 | 23.4 |
Sugarbaker's enters a Christmas design contest, but are worried about their ideas being copied. While checking one of the competitor's designs out, Julia and Mary Jo have to hide under a promiscuous anchorman's bed to avoid being caught in his house.
| 130 | 12 | "Real, Scary Men" | David Steinberg | Cathryn Michon | December 9, 1991 | 23.1 |
When their van breaks down the women become unwelcome guests at men's club retreat Wildman Sanctuary, where Anthony is trying to land a new account.
| 131 | 13 | "Tales Out of School" | David Steinberg | Paul Clay & Pam Norris | December 16, 1991 | 24.7 |
Anthony sees opportunity when his normally unfriendly law professor is attracted to Carlene and invites the two of them to his annual Christmas party.
| 132 | 14 | "Driving My Mama Back Home" | William Cosentino | Dee LaDuke & Mark Alton Brown | January 6, 1992 | 26.2 |
Julia and Mary Jo take Mary Jo's mother home on an overnight bus trip. Allison, Carlene and Anthony get locked in the storeroom while taking inventory.
| 133 | 15 | "Payne Comes Home" | Paul Clay | Eleanor S. Hyde-White | January 13, 1992 | 24.0 |
Julia's son Payne returns home with news that his marriage is ending.
| 134 | 16 | "Carlene's Apartment" | David Steinberg | Paul Clay | January 20, 1992 | 24.8 |
Carlene invites Julia, Mary Jo, Allison, Anthony and Bernice to a sleepover to celebrate her finding her own apartment, which turns out to be not in the best part of town. They end up fleeing in the middle of the night.
| 135 | 17 | "Mamed" | David Steinberg | Dee LaDuke & Mark Alton Brown | February 3, 1992 | 23.7 |
A tough-talking, hard-drinking, temperamental Broadway has-been promises to make Julia rue the day that she stole the role of Mame from her in Anthony's community-theater production. But on opening night she is too drunk to perform, and Anthony is pressed into taking on the role.
| 136 | 18 | "A Scene from a Mall" | David Steinberg | Dee LaDuke & Mark Alton Brown | February 24, 1992 | 23.5 |
Mall security guards accuse Anthony of criminal activities when he is standing outside a jewelry store. Julia stages a sit-in at the mall to protest his unfair treatment.
| 137 | 19 | "All About Odes to Atlanta" | David Steinberg | Dee LaDuke & Mark Alton Brown | March 2, 1992 | 24.3 |
Carlene enters an Atlanta theme-song contest and convinces Mary Jo and Julia to perform her jingle with her at the contest finals. Shortly after entering, Carlene gets a groupie who wants to be as helpful as she can with the contest. She turns out to be a competitor in the jingle contest who is trying to sabotage Carlene's chance at winning.
| 138 | 20 | "I Enjoy Being a Girl" | David Steinberg | Norma Safford Vela | March 9, 1992 | 23.3 |
On an overnight Girl Scout outing, Carlene's leadership abilities take a beating while Allison's methods seem to charm the spoiled troopers, and Mary Jo and Julia advocate roughing it.
| 139 | 21 | "L.A. Story" | Roberta Sherry Scelza | Paul Clay | March 23, 1992 | 25.9 |
Allison invests in a Hollywood film, then brings everyone to director Charles Nelson Reilly's home. He has no idea who they are and Allison learns she has basically been conned out of her $25,000 investment.
| 140 | 22 | "A Little Night Music" | David Steinberg | Linda Bloodworth-Thomason | April 27, 1992 | 23.2 |
Julia strolls down memory lane while awaiting the results of hysterectomy tests at a hospital whose workers are on strike, and a surgeon turns out to be her prescription for romance.
| 141 | 23 | "Shades of Vanessa" | Art Dielhenn | Linda Bloodworth-Thomason | May 4, 1992 | 24.3 |
The Sugarbaker women use Anthony as "date bait" to reel in a big account involving a hotelier's flamboyant debutante daughter who's angling for a whopper of a deal, then Anthony announces he is marrying Vanessa who intends to become a partner in Sugarbaker's. Note: This is Julia Duffy's final appearance in the series.

== DVD release ==
The sixth season was released on DVD by Shout! Factory on April 3, 2012.
