= Yu Nakamura =

Japanese singer

- Born: May 13, 1987 (age 39); Nara, Nara, Japan
- Genres: Rock, pop, electronica
- Occupations: Musician, model
- Instruments: Vocals, guitar
- Label: Avex Group Holdings Inc.

Yu Nakamura (中村優, Nakamura Yū; born May 13, 1987, in Nara, Nara, Japan) is a Japanese singer, professional model and Japanese television personality. In 2005 she won the Japanese Miss Magazine Idol contest and won the "Jury's Special Award", 2005, after which she began appearing as a professional model and on various television shows. For a time she was reporter for the Tokyo Broadcasting System. In 2007–2008 she released three Japanese idol videos.

== History ==
In the 2008–2009 season, she appeared on the TV show Saku Saku and became a regular Master of Ceremonies. On one appearance in the show she brought a guitar on set and began a song titled "Yu Nakamura's Theme". On another episode she is seen in the United States competing in the 36th Honolulu Marathon, for which she got a final 'Chip time' of 4 hours 49 minutes and 54 seconds, finishing in 5026th place. Beginning on January 8, 2009, her single "Questions?" appeared on The Tower of Druaga: the Sword of Uruk anime series as the opening theme. The single was released January 28, 2009, with a backing track titled "Today" and a secret track, a CD release of her previous "Yu Nakamora's Theme". "Questions?" was also her first music video, followed four months later by her second video and single for the song "Jibun Color". "Jibun Color" became her second anime series theme, this time for the Major TV series as its ending theme (episodes 121–). She recently played the role of Ritsuka Yuki, one of the main heroes in Tomica Hero: Rescue Fire.

== Discography ==
Questions? Single released January 28, 2009

- Questions
- Today

(Secret Track)

  - Yu Nakamura's Theme

Jibun Color Single released May 20, 2009

- Jibun Color
- Future's Melody
