= List of The Middle characters =

The Middle is an American sitcom about a working-class family living in Indiana and facing the day-to-day struggles of home life, work, and raising children. The Middle originally aired from September 30, 2009, to May 22, 2018, on the ABC network. The ensemble cast includes Patricia Heaton, Neil Flynn, Charlie McDermott, Eden Sher, and Atticus Schaffer. The following is a list of characters, including the main cast and those who appear alongside the main cast in the series.

== Cast overview ==
Actor	Character	The Middle								
Actor	Character	1	2	3	4	5	6	7	8	9
Patricia Heaton	Frankie Heck	Main	Main	Main	Main	Main	Main	Main	Main	Main
Neil Flynn	Mike Heck	Main	Main	Main	Main	Main	Main	Main	Main	Main
Charlie McDermott	Axl Heck	Main	Main	Main	Main	Main	Main	Main	Main	Main
Eden Sher	Sue Heck	Main	Main	Main	Main	Main	Main	Main	Main	Main
Atticus Shaffer	Brick Heck	Main	Main	Main	Main	Main	Main	Main	Main	Main
Chris Kattan	Bob Weaver	Main	Main	Recurring	Guest	Guest				
Brock Ciarlelli	Brad Bottig	Recurring	Recurring	Recurring	Recurring	Recurring	Recurring	Recurring	Recurring	Recurring
Jen Ray	Nancy Donahue	Recurring	Recurring	Recurring	Recurring	Recurring	Recurring	Recurring	Recurring	Recurring
Beau Wirick	Sean Donahue	Recurring	Recurring	Recurring	Recurring	Recurring	Recurring	Recurring	Recurring	Recurring
Malcolm Foster Smith	Dave	Recurring	Recurring	Recurring	Recurring	Recurring	Recurring	Recurring	Recurring	Recurring
Troy Metcalf	Jim	Recurring	Recurring	Recurring	Recurring	Recurring	Recurring	Recurring	Recurring	Recurring
Laura Ann Kesling	Dotty Donahue	Guest	Guest	Recurring		Recurring		Guest	Recurring	Recurring
Brooke Shields	Rita Glossner	Guest			Guest	Guest		Guest	Guest	Guest
John Gammon	Darrin McGrew	Recurring	Recurring	Recurring	Recurring	Recurring	Recurring			
Blaine Saunders	Carly	Recurring	Recurring	Recurring	Recurring	Guest	Guest			Guest
Jeanette Miller	Edie Freehold	Recurring	Recurring	Recurring	Recurring					
Andrew J. Fishman	Zack	Guest	Guest	Guest	Guest					Guest
Aidan Potter	Scott	Guest	Guest	Guest	Guest					Guest
Bryce Hurless	Henry	Guest	Guest	Guest	Guest					Guest
Jake Netter	Theo	Guest	Guest	Guest	Guest					
Mason Cook	Corey	Guest	Guest	Guest	Guest					
Brian Doyle-Murray	Don Ehlert	Recurring	Recurring	Recurring	Guest	Recurring	Guest			Guest
Peter Breitmayer	Pete Miller	Recurring	Recurring	Guest	Guest					Guest
Frances Bay	Ginny Freehold	Recurring	Recurring							
Paul Hipp	Reverend Tim-Tom	Guest	Recurring	Guest	Recurring	Guest		Guest	Guest	Recurring
Marsha Mason	Pat Spence	Guest	Guest	Recurring	Recurring	Guest	Guest	Recurring		Guest
John Cullum	Michael Heck Sr. ("Big Mike")	Guest	Guest	Recurring	Guest		Guest	Guest	Guest	Guest
Pat Finn	Bill Norwood		Recurring	Recurring		Recurring	Guest	Recurring	Recurring	Recurring
Julie Brown	Paula Norwood		Recurring	Recurring		Guest		Recurring	Recurring	Guest
Greg Cipes	Chuck		Recurring	Recurring	Recurring	Recurring	Recurring	Recurring	Recurring	Recurring
Nick Shafer	Arlo		Recurring							
Katlin Mastandrea	Ashley Wyman ("Weird Ashley")		Guest	Recurring	Recurring	Recurring	Guest		Recurring	Guest
Norm Macdonald	Orville "Rusty" Heck		Guest	Recurring	Guest	Guest	Guest	Guest	Guest	Guest
Sean O'Bryan	Ron Donahue		Guest	Recurring		Guest		Recurring	Recurring	Recurring
Jerry Van Dyke	Tag Spence		Guest	Guest	Recurring	Recurring	Recurring			
Kayla Madison	Shelly Donahue							Guest	Recurring	Recurring
Grace Bannon	Ruth			Recurring	Recurring	Recurring	Recurring	Guest	Guest	
Jessica Marie Garcia	Becky			Recurring	Recurring	Guest	Guest			
Brittany Ross	Courtney			Recurring	Recurring	Recurring	Guest	Guest		Guest
Natalie Lander	Debbie			Recurring	Recurring	Recurring	Guest	Guest		Guest
Christopher Darga	Mr. Farrar			Recurring	Recurring	Guest	Guest	Guest		
Moises Arias	Matt			Recurring	Guest					
Jack McBrayer	Dr. Ted Goodwin				Recurring	Recurring		Recurring	Guest	Guest
Galadriel Stineman	Cassidy Finch				Recurring	Recurring			Guest	
Dave Foley	Dr. Fulton				Recurring	Guest	Guest		Guest	Guest
Tommy Bechtold	Kenny					Recurring	Recurring	Recurring	Recurring	Guest
Alphonso McAuley	Charles "Hutch" Hutchinson					Recurring	Recurring	Recurring	Recurring	Guest
Casey Burke	Cindy Hornberger						Recurring	Recurring	Recurring	Recurring
Gia Mantegna	Devin Levin						Recurring	Guest	Guest	
David Hull	Logan						Guest	Recurring		
Daniela Bobadilla	Lexie Brooks							Recurring	Recurring	Recurring
Jovan Armand	Troy Tangeroa							Recurring	Recurring	
Will Green	Jeremy							Recurring	Recurring	
Keaton Savage	Tyler							Guest	Recurring	Recurring
Greer Grammer	April								Recurring	

== The Hecks ==
Frances Heck
- The Middle character
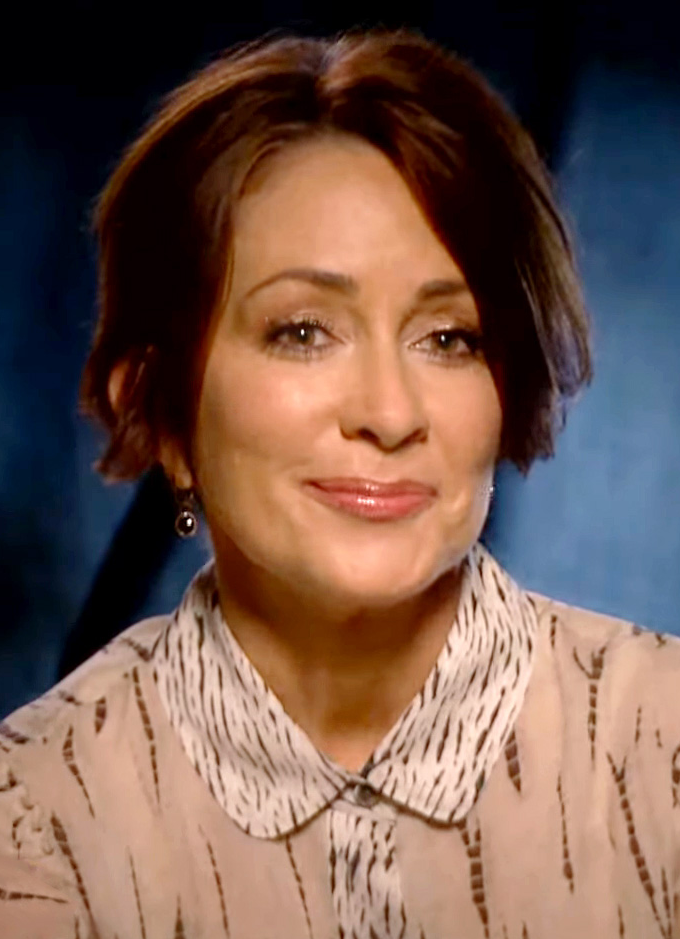
- Patricia Heaton portrays Frances Heck.
- First appearance: The Pilot (2009)
- Last appearance: A Heck of a Ride (2018)
- Created by: Eileen Heisler; DeAnn Heline
- Portrayed by: Patricia Heaton

In-universe information
- Spouse: Mike Heck

- Patricia Heaton as Frances Patricia "Frankie" Heck (née Spence), is the wife of Mike and mother of Axl, Sue, and Brick. Frankie is the central character in the show, as her voice is heard narrating at various points in every episode. She is a devoted wife and mother and sees family as the most important thing in her life. Her motto, "You do for family", guides her daily routine, despite the frustrations she encounters with her husband and three kids, as well as her older ailing relatives who often depend on her. She often forgets family members' birthdays (most frequently Brick's) and her and Mike's anniversary. Frankie attended college but did not finish. She is often busy with work and does not have time to volunteer at her children's school activities. When the family goes on a trip, she always forgets "the blue bag" which has the food in it. She initially works as an under-performing salesperson at Ehlert Motors, a job she took after losing her position as a dentist's receptionist when the office closed. After she loses this job in season 4, Frankie completes dental assisting school and gets a job at a dentist's office near the end of the season, a job she would keep for the remainder of the show's run.

Mike Heck
- The Middle character
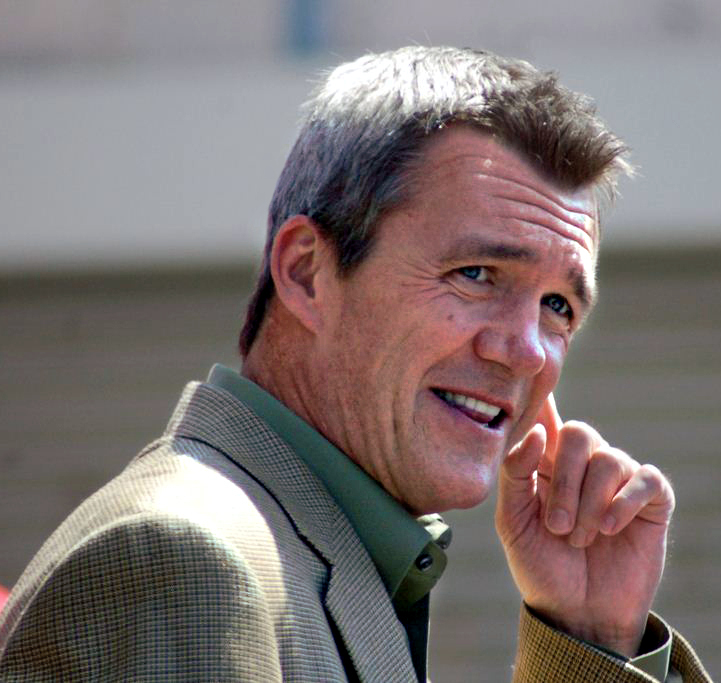
- Neil Flynn portrays Mike Heck.
- First appearance: The Pilot (2009)
- Last appearance: A Heck of a Ride (2018)
- Created by: Eileen Heisler; DeAnn Heline
- Portrayed by: Neil Flynn

In-universe information
- Spouse: Frankie Heck

- Neil Flynn as Michael Bartholomew "Mike" Heck Jr., Frankie's husband, known for his straightforward manner and lack of emotion. Mike works at the local limestone quarry as the manager. He reaches his 25-year work anniversary at the quarry in the season 9 episode "The Crying Game", wherein he is promoted to Regional Manager. Despite his no-nonsense approach to work and family, Mike is a devoted and understanding husband and father who always seems to come through for Frankie and the kids. It is said on several occasions that Mike's favorite film is Reservoir Dogs and that, when they were younger, he only asked Frankie out on a second date because she lied and said she also liked the film. Mike's reclusive, emotionally distant father, "Big Mike" (John Cullum), and Mike's well-meaning but unreliable brother Rusty (Norm Macdonald) both live in Orson. Season 8's "Clear and Present Danger" reveals that Mike's mother died of lung cancer at age 42, and his father made him do his homework and go to school the next day instead of allowing Mike time to mourn. Mike loves all sports but is particularly passionate about seeing the Indianapolis Colts play in the Super Bowl. In season 7, he and Rusty start a business designing disposable diapers with sports team logos on them named "Li'l Rivals", which he sells off in the next season to pay for Sue's college tuition.

Axl Heck
- The Middle character
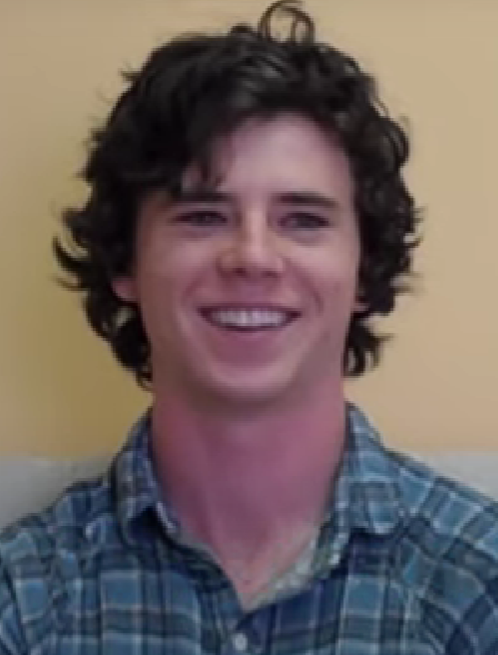
- Charlie McDermott portrays Axl Heck.
- First appearance: The Pilot (2009)
- Last appearance: A Heck of a Ride (2018)
- Created by: Eileen Heisler; DeAnn Heline
- Portrayed by: Charlie McDermott

In-universe information
- Spouses: April (first wife, annulled); Lexie Brooks (second wife)

- Charlie McDermott as Axl Redford Heck, Frankie and Mike's oldest son. Unlike his siblings, Axl is sarcastic, lazy, selfish, and a bit of a narcissist. However, he has his heart in the right place whenever he helps out a family member or friend or win over one of his girlfriends. With his frequent problems and the situations he is brought into, Axl is arguably the most frustrating to Mike and Frankie, who in particular wishes to be more open with her, as he was apparently a very loving "mama's boy" when he was a child, something Frankie seems to want to recapture. Despite his behavior, Axl is much more charismatic, outgoing, and popular at school than his siblings are, but his skills do not extend to his grades in school. Axl also plays electric guitar, and it is presumed that he was named after Guns N' Roses frontman Axl Rose. Axl is two years older than Sue, as evidenced in the third season when he starts his junior year in high school and she starts her freshman year. His girlfriends over the series include wizardry fan and outcast "Weird" Ashley Wyman (Katlin Mastandrea), student tutor Cassidy Finch, and tomboy Devin Levin. As a star running back on his high school football team, he is recruited by a Division II state university in Indiana. In college, he decides to major in business. Early in season 8, Axl dates and then secretly marries his slow-witted girlfriend April, mainly as a way to defy his parents, who don't like April. The marriage is quickly annulled after both sets of parents find out. At the end of season 8, he begins dating Sue's roommate Lexie and graduates from college with a business degree. Between seasons 8 and 9, he travels around Europe with his former roommate Kenny to promote Kenny's upcoming apps. After briefly working as a school bus driver and at the restaurant Spudsy's earlier in season 9, Axl gets his first professional job as a sales representative for a plumbing fixture company in the episode "The 200th". In the series finale, he moves to Denver in search of a job opportunity, but a flash-forward reveals that he eventually returns to Orson, marries Lexie, and has three sons who behave similarly to how he did in his youth.

Sue Heck
- The Middle character
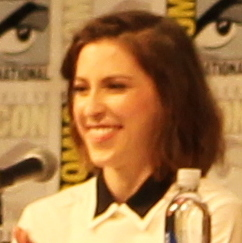
- Eden Sher portrays Sue Heck.
- First appearance: The Pilot (2009)
- Last appearance: A Heck of a Ride (2018)
- Created by: Eileen Heisler; DeAnn Heline
- Portrayed by: Eden Sher

In-universe information
- Spouse: Sean Donahue

- Eden Sher as Sue Sue Heck, the middle daughter of Frankie and Mike whose sunny personality tend to make her an object of ridicule, especially by Axl. Her first and middle names are the same due to an accident on her birth certificate. Despite her best efforts, she is usually unrecognized by teachers and other students. Many of her plot lines involve her being overlooked, or trying to organize parties or events and receiving no help. She often seeks life advice from a website called "kickingitteenstyle.com", and later "kickingitcollegestyle.com" starting in season 7. Her tell when she is lying is indicated by ending her sentences with "...and so on, and so forth, and what have you". She wears braces for the first five seasons, which are briefly removed in season 3 and permanently at the beginning of season 6, requiring her to wear only a retainer thereafter. She is also left-handed, apparently the only southpaw in her immediate family. She is two years behind Axl in school, graduating high school in the season 6 finale. She is known for trying out for almost every group activity in school but never actually getting picked, as she lacks the necessary skills. In season 2, she joins the no-cut cross country team. Sue becomes a cheerleader called a "wrestlerette" in season 3, only to learn her group includes other misfits, and dates a wrestler named Matt for a short time. In season 4, she dates Axl's friend Darrin MacGrew. She is engaged to Darrin for three days in season 6, before deciding she does not want to get married yet and ending their relationship. The season 3 episode "Leap Year" reveals she was born on Leap Day. In season 7, she gets accepted into the same college Axl is attending. Throughout the series, she has an on-and-off crush on Sean Donahue, and they become an official couple by the end of the series. In season 9, she is a junior in college majoring in hospitality management. In a flash-forward in the series finale, Frankie narrates Sue and Sean broke up and got back together a couple of times before finally being married, with Reverend Tim-Tom officiating.

Brick Heck
- The Middle character
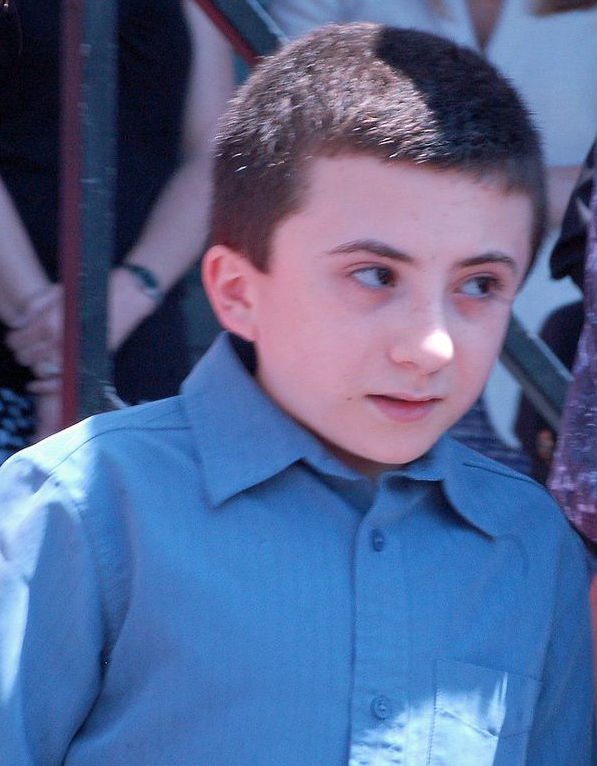
- Atticus Shaffer portrays Brick Heck.
- First appearance: The Pilot (2009)
- Last appearance: A Heck of a Ride (2018)
- Created by: Eileen Heisler; DeAnn Heline
- Portrayed by: Atticus Shaffer

In-universe information
- Spouse: Cindy Hornberger

- Atticus Shaffer as Brick Ishmail Heck, the other son and youngest of Mike and Frankie's children. He loves to read and has a case of palilalia, which is demonstrated by his repeating words from previous sentences to himself in a whisper. He has trouble lying because he will usually follow it up by whispering, "I'm lying". In season 6, he says he does not whisper when he is lying anymore, but now he farts. In season 1 episode 5, it is revealed that he possesses an eidetic memory. He is smarter than most teenagers, having read Of Mice and Men, a book his elder brother is struggling with at the same time. He also loves the Planet Nowhere book series, which is native to the show, and the real-life Percy Jackson & the Olympians. He has referred to Diary of a Wimpy Kid as "the book that changed my life". He is exceptionally intelligent but easily distracted, leading him to procrastinate on doing his homework assignments and projects. In the season seven episode "Find my Hecks", in response to Cindy discussing her IEP diagnosis, Brick states he has trouble focusing on non-preferred activities, with a diagnostic code of borderline 5A62, which may be a reference to disability codes related to the IEP. Brick is also a known gephyrophobiac and is fascinated with fonts. Due to his awkwardness, he struggles to make friends. In season 1, he is put in a social skills class with kids like him: one thinks he is a cat; one only eats red food. In season 2, he befriends an equally awkward boy named Arlo, whom even Brick struggles to deal with. He is five years behind Sue in school, starting the eighth grade in the seventh season. In season 2 episode 7, it is revealed that he was accidentally switched at birth with another baby due to Mike watching a football game and taking home a child that the nurse brought up next to Brick, and he spent a month with that child's family while the other baby was with the Hecks. In season 8, Brick meets the other child, Blake Ferguson, along with the literature-loving Ferguson parents, and discovers that it was likely exposure to them as an infant that led to his appreciation for reading and classical music. While Sue gets overlooked by classmates and teachers, Brick is constantly overlooked by his own family. Frankie and Mike have forgotten his birthday multiple times. In season 8, Brick makes it into the National Honor Society, a first for a Heck family member, but his parents did not know until Frankie hears a voicemail from someone at Brick's school informing the Hecks of Brick's accomplishment. He has a girlfriend named Cindy. In season 9, Brick is a sophomore at Orson High School. He asks Cindy to the prom, and Frankie invites the former students from the social skills class for a pre-prom party. They no longer have the eccentric qualities that they had in season 1, but Brick still has his same quirks. In a flash-forward in the series finale, Brick is married and a famous author who writes a popular book series for teens loosely based on his childhood habits of treating his backpack like his friend and his microfiche machine addiction. Though it is not stated whom he marries in the finale, the seventh season episode "Halloween VI: Tick Tock Death" hints that Brick marries and starts a family with Cindy.

== Recurring characters ==
=== Extended family ===
- Edie and Ginny Freehold (Jeanette Miller and Frances Bay, introduced in season 1) are Frankie's elderly aunts who are heavy smokers and drinkers. Aunt Edie used to work in Mike's quarry as the bookkeeper, often showing signs of memory loss. One such occasion is when they went to a funeral for Edie and Ginny's brother, and Aunt Edie thought it was her birthday. Aunt Ginny uses a wheelchair and rarely talks. They have a sickly Basset Hound named Doris. On many occasions, Frankie is forced to care for Doris unexpectedly; on one such occasion, Doris gave birth to puppies. In the season 3 episode "The Map", which premiered in early 2012, Aunt Ginny dies (Frances Bay had died in real life in 2011). Brick's elderly friend, Grandma Dot, then moves in with Edie to take care of her. In the early 2015 episode "Hecks on a Train", Aunt Edie has just died (actress Jeanette Miller had retired from acting before she herself died in 2016) and the Hecks are left to care for Doris.
- Michael "Big Mike" Heck Sr. (John Cullum, introduced in season 1) is Mike's reclusive, man-of-few-words father, who is a widower. He appears to be an unloving, uncaring parent, but this is primarily because he simply does not want to be a "bother" for either of his sons. He is also depicted as a hoarder. In season 6, Big Mike and Axl fixed the Hecks' kitchen sink, which was a rare bonding experience for the two of them. In season 8 it is revealed that he sent Mike Jr. to school the day after his mother died, not allowing him time to grieve.
- Orville "Rusty" Heck (Norm Macdonald, introduced in season 2) is Mike's unreliable, irresponsible, dim-witted but well meaning brother. In his season 2 introduction, he is shown living in a tent in front of his burned down house. He often makes up excuses why he cannot be anywhere or do anything Mike asks him to do. He once took Brick out of school to bowl and to teach him how to drive, even though he was not old enough or ready. It is revealed in the season 3 finale that his real first name is Orville. Also in the season 3 finale the Hecks get an invitation to his wedding but it says the wedding is happening at their house. Rusty marries a woman named Marlene, but in season 5 when Marlene invites herself to Thanksgiving at the Hecks' house, Rusty tells them that they got a divorce because she slept with his best friend. Rusty appears later in season 5 and is homeless (again). He ends up moving in with the Hecks, and accompanies Mike and Brick to Brick's spelling bee in Chicago, where Rusty makes a deal with Brick to lose, allowing Rusty to win some money on a bet he made. In season 7, Rusty comes up with a business idea that Mike shockingly thinks might work, and the two start a side business together.
- Pat Spence (Marsha Mason, introduced in season 1) is Frankie's mother. Pat appeared at least once in all of the first seven seasons. Her first appearance was in season 1 episode 22 ("Mother's Day"). Her last appearance was in the season 9 episode "The Setup".
- Tag Spence (Jerry Van Dyke, introduced in season 2) is Frankie's father. Tag is a schmoozer and always talks to Mike endlessly, which Mike finds very uncomfortable and annoying. In season 4, Tag calls Mike to meet up at a Stuckey's restaurant, to have man-to-man chats every Sunday. After a couple of meetings, Mike decides he just cannot possibly stand to do it any longer, so he suggests that Tag should try chatting with people on Facebook. Tag's final appearance was in season 6, episode 21 ("Two of a Kind"). The episode reveals a longstanding feud between Tag and his brother Dutch (played by Jerry Van Dyke's real-life brother Dick Van Dyke), which is mostly fueled by Tag's jealousy, and Mike and Frankie end up trying to resolve it.

=== Co-workers ===
- Bob Weaver (Chris Kattan, introduced in season 1) is Frankie's co-worker and friend at Ehlert Motors. He is depicted as a lonely, insecure man who lives with his mother and does not seem to have any friends. Thus, he tends to insert himself into the Hecks' family life whenever he can. Bob was credited as a main character in the first two seasons, but the role was significantly reduced after Frankie was fired from Ehlert Motors. He was a recurring character in season 3, and has since made two other appearances (his final one in season 5, when Frankie rushes out to her dental office job but accidentally goes to Ehlert Motors). Bob and Mike once moonlighted together delivering Little Betty snack cakes to stores.
- Don Ehlert (Brian Doyle-Murray, introduced in season 1) is the racist and misogynistic owner of the car dealership where Frankie used to work, and where Bob presumably still works. Frankie and Bob constantly worry that he is going to fire them. Ehlert's wife left him when he chose work over her, and Frankie was first sympathetic but later turned angry. He often drinks at work. Ehlert, like Mike, likes sports. As with Bob, appearances by the Mr. Ehlert character were significantly reduced after Frankie was fired from Ehlert Motors.
- Pete Miller (Peter Breitmayer, introduced in season 1) is Ehlert Motors' best salesman and star employee, and he is not afraid to tell everyone about it. Pete often brags about his success at Frankie's and Bob's expense, putting them down about how little they contribute to the business while developing a "teacher's pet" relationship with Mr. Ehlert.
- Dave (Malcolm Foster Smith, introduced in season 1) is an employee at the quarry Mike manages. He has appeared in at least two episodes every season.
- Jim (Troy Metcalf, introduced in season 1) is an employee at the quarry Mike manages. He has appeared in at least one episode every season.
- Chuck (Greg Cipes, introduced in season 2) is a younger, laidback employee at the quarry Mike manages. He once babysat for Brick, giving him questionable advice on a school project. He often speaks in the third person, referring to himself as "The Chuck".
- Dr. Ted Goodwin (Jack McBrayer, introduced in season 4) is the dentist who hires Frankie as a hygienist in season 4. He has few friends, and Frankie is forced to spend time with him after work in "The Jump" (season 5). Ted's dental office is bought out by the conglomerate Smile Sensations in season 7. Frankie does not like the changes, but continues to work there.
- Edwin (Jimmy Bellinger, introduced in season 5) is the young manager at Spudsy's, a baked potato fast food restaurant in a mall food court where Sue worked steadily since season 5.

=== Neighbors ===
- Nancy Donahue (Jen Ray) is the Hecks' neighbor and president of the booster club. The Donahues (Nancy, her husband Ron, their son Sean, and their two daughters) are portrayed as the idyllic family Frankie yearns to be like. From season 5, episode 4 ("The 100th"), Nancy and Frankie's friendship has waned a little, mainly because Nancy overheard Mike and Frankie talking about her. In season 7, episode 18 ("A Very Donahue Vacation") Nancy's daughter, Shelly hears Frankie talking about Nancy and tells her. However, Nancy forgives Frankie and they remain good friends.
- Mr. Johnson (Terrence Beasor, introduced in season 2) is the Hecks' neighbor and an elderly man. In the episode "Halloween", he recognized Brick's costume as Sergeant Charles Stuart Mackenzie, and invited him to his house.
- Ron Donahue (Sean O'Bryan, introduced in season 2) is Nancy's husband and the father of Sean, Dotty and Shelly. He appears to be very involved in his kids' lives.
- Rita Glossner (Brooke Shields) is the Hecks' uncouth and troubled neighbor. She is the single parent of four rambunctious boys, as she had kicked the boys' father out of the house some years ago. The Glossners appear to be the only family on the block that is worse off financially than the Hecks. Rita often shows her disdain for the Hecks' higher status, even calling Frankie a "one-percenter" in the season 7 episode, "Halloween VI: Tick Tock Death". Only three Glossner boys are introduced at first, but the season 8 episode "Trip and Fall" reveals that Rita has a fourth son, Rodney, her oldest child who has just made her a grandmother. In the season 9 episode "Hecks vs. Glossners: The Final Battle", Rita's children are sent to juvenile detention. After her children are gone, it brings out the nicer side of Rita.
- Derrick Glossner (David Chandler), Wade Glossner (Parker Bolek), and "Diaper" Glossner (Gibson Bobby Sjobeck) (all introduced in season 1) make up the dreaded Glossner boys, Rita's children. They are neighborhood bullies who used to terrorize Sue and Brick. In the first season, Sue and Carly attempt to fight the two older Glossner boys via a dance routine set to "Kung Fu Fighting". In the fifth season, Derrick reveals he has a crush on Sue and unexpectedly kisses her multiple times. Despite describing her as a "rich girl" with "one dad and two different kinds of chips" (and thus out of his league), he vows to better himself and come back for her someday. In the season 9 episode "Hecks vs. Glossners: The Final Battle", Derrick proclaims he has kept his promise by getting a part-time job at a tattoo parlor that pays him $50 a week. Sue tells him she is in love with someone else (Sean Donahue), prompting Derrick to call her a "cheater".
- Paula Norwood (Julie Brown, introduced in season 2) is another of the Hecks' neighbors. She serves as somewhat of a counterpoint to the idyllic Nancy Donahue in that her life and family (including husband Bill) is depicted as being similar to Frankie's, having a lot of the same issues. Her final appearance on the show was in Season 7's "Hecks at a Movie" and in Season 9's "The 200th", it's revealed that she and Bill separated.
- Bill Norwood (Pat Finn, introduced in season 2) is the Hecks' neighbor and Paula's husband who frequently embarrasses her. Bill tends to try too hard to convince Mike he's his friend, to the point of buying Mike expensive sunglasses for Christmas, even though the two had never agreed to exchange gifts. Bill reveals in the season 9 episode "The 200th" that he and Paula are separated. In the season 9 episode "Hecks vs. Glossners: The Final Battle", Bill meets a female police officer and the two agree to go on a date. They are shown to be still together in the series finale.
- Dierdre Peterson (Emily Rutherfurd, introduced in season 7) is the Hecks' new next-door neighbor. She has three rambunctious, noisy children, plus a new baby.

=== Axl's friends ===
- Sean Donahue (Beau Wirick) is one of Axl's best friends, teammate on the high school football team, and neighbor Nancy Donahue's only son. He is helpful, kind, and polite, he is also very friendly, as well as a straight-A student, which makes him outwardly the opposite of Axl; that said, he always supports everything Axl does however, he sometimes tries to talk him out of ideas that are stupid or reckless. In season 2, Sue develops a crush on Sean, but eventually ends the one-way relationship. In season 5, Sean came back from college to take Sue to prom upon learning that she had no date, but by the time he arrived, Sue had made plans to go with Darrin. Similarly, he often makes the several hour drive home from Notre Dame (at the request of his mother) to help the Hecks whenever there is a crisis, only to find the crisis resolved by the time he gets there. It was revealed in the season 7 episode "Hecks at a Movie" that his and Axl's respective first kisses were inadvertently with one another in a dark closet, something they have vowed to never speak of again. Also in season 7, Sean has taken on a hippie persona and has become a vegetarian (much to Nancy's embarrassment). By season 8, Sean has reverted to a more clean-cut look. The events of season 8 reveal that Sean and Sue have a mutual affection, but neither person is yet aware of the other's feelings. Sean goes on one date with Sue's roommate Lexie, but it doesn't lead anywhere. In the season 9 episode "The Christmas Miracle", Sue and Sean are talking when they eventually realize they both have very strong feelings for each other and they passionately kiss. However, obstacles continue to arise that keep the two from being together, and they never officially form a couple. Sean announces he will be living in Ghana all summer for medical work, much disappointing Sue who had growing feelings for him. In the series finale, the two finally profess their love for each other, and a flash-forward reveals they eventually marry after breaking up a couple of times.
- Darrin McGrew (John Gammon, seasons 1–6) is Axl's other best friend (along with Sean Donahue) and teammate. Darrin is the most passive and simple of Axl's friends, often landing himself, Sean, and Axl in problematic situations. In season 3, he takes Sue to the prom because of her "sunny disposition" and explained to Axl that he (Darrin) just wanted to go with someone and dance. In season 4, Darrin takes Sue to a Valentine's Day dance after her date cancels; and when tidying up in the hall after the dance they share a kiss. Later Darrin confides that he wants to continue dating Sue, which angers Axl. However, near the end of season 4, Sue breaks up with him after he accidentally punched her in the face while she was trying to break up a fight between him and Axl. After high school, Darrin enrolls in a heating and air conditioning repair school. In season 5, Sue feels like the breakup was a mistake and realizes that they only broke up because Axl was being so weird about it. With Axl having gone off to college, Sue gains a renewed interest in Darrin until she sees that he has a new girlfriend (Angel). Darrin later decides that his current girlfriend is too high-maintenance and he brings flowers to Sue, only to see her being kissed by Derrick Glossner. Despite a series of misunderstandings, the two ultimately reconnect at Sue's prom in season 5, and become a couple again. He proposes to Sue in the 6th season, and under pressure, she accepts. After realizing she does not want to be married yet, Sue breaks off the engagement with him three days later. Darrin only has one more appearance after that.
- Charles "Hutch" Hutchinson (Alphonso McAuley, seasons 5–9) is Axl's football teammate, best friend, and eventual roommate at college. Like Axl, Hutch does not get much playing time on the East Indiana State football team. In the season 9 episode "Eyes Wide Open", Axl visits Hutch at his comfortable new apartment in Chicago and finds his former roommate behaving more like a responsible adult, inspiring him to do the same.
- Kenny (Tommy Bechtold, seasons 5–9) is Axl's college roommate who seemingly does nothing but play video games. He is mostly shown from behind as he sits at his computer. His face is shown briefly at the end of the season 5 episode "The Kiss". In an episode of season 6 ("The Table") Axl and Hutch move out of the dorm and into a rental house, but realize they cannot afford it on their own. They ask Kenny to tag along and invite him to be their roommate, too, mainly because that he is reliable in paying bills and rent. Kenny speaks on-screen for the first time (and his face is shown again) in the season 7 episode "Halloween VI: Tick Tock Death", in which he explains the lore surrounding the Grim Reaper. The season 8 episode "Pitch Imperfect" reveals that Kenny has been developing some apps in between playing games, and has a fairly substantial net worth that will allow him retire within one year. Off camera between seasons 8 and 9, Axl accompanies Kenny on a trip through Europe to promote Kenny's apps. In the season 9 episode "Toasted", Kenny marries a girl he met on a train in Amsterdam.

=== Sue's friends ===
- Bradley "Brad" Bottig (Brock Ciarlelli) is Sue's flamboyant, theater-loving, tap dancing, slightly camp and lowkey fruity ex-boyfriend, who is on the high school wrestling team, though Sue is seemingly oblivious to his stereotypically homosexual behavior. They date during Thanksgiving (season 1), but soon break up. Mike and Frankie assume the breakup was the result of Sue learning that Brad is gay, but Sue claims it is because she found out Brad has a smoking habit. Brad remains good friends with Sue despite their breakup. In season 7, Brad prepares to come out to Sue as gay, to which she responds that she knows, and she shows him love and support. In season 8, Brad transfers to East Indiana State, saying he felt dwarfed as a student at NYU.
- Carly (Blaine Saunders, seasons 1–6, 9) is Sue's best female friend. She began in season 1 as a geeky character, wearing glasses and braces. Her braces were removed mid-season 1, and she became more popular as a result. Sue seems to be jealous, if only subconsciously, and wears makeup which her family finds garish. From season 2 onwards, Carly has reverted to a more geeky look. After making multiple appearances in seasons 1–4, Carly only made one appearance in season 5 (episode 14, "The Award") and one appearance in season 6 (episode 11, "A Quarry Story"). In a season 9 episode ("New Year's Revelations"), Carly attends the Hecks' New Year's Eve party, where it is revealed that she has a baby (and it is implied that she is a single mother).
- Ashley "Weird Ashley" Wyman (Katlin Mastandrea, introduced in season 2) is Axl's socially challenged classmate who is his accidental date to a prom dance on two occasions. She is also on Sue's wrestlerette team. She has a keen interest in wizardry, although she has never heard of the Harry Potter franchise. At their third prom together, Ashley is not Axl's date but dances with him when he's announced as prom king, as Axl and his date Cassidy had broken up only a few moments before the announcement. In subsequent appearances, she continues to stalk Axl, who repeatedly denies that they were ever an item. In the series finale, Ashley shows up to wish Axl good luck as he leaves for Denver, adding creepily that she will "always know" what's going on with him.
- Ruth (Grace Bannon, introduced in season 3) is a member of Sue's wrestlerette team, depicted as an extreme religious conservative, often referencing the Rapture and growing up with a large number of siblings. Unlike the other wrestlerettes, Ruth wears an ankle-length skirt. After graduation, she loses contact with Sue.
- Becky (Jessica Marie Garcia, introduced in season 3) is a rough-and-tumble member of Sue's wrestlerette team. She is a troublemaker and always tries to solve the rivalry with the cheerleaders with a fight. After graduation, she loses contact with Sue.
- Alexis "Lexie" Brooks (Daniela Bobadilla, seasons 7–9) is Sue's college classmate who, like Sue, fails to get accepted by any sororities at the school. She later becomes Sue's dorm mate and best friend. She loves horses, and her family is rich. In the season 8 episode "Hoosier Maid", Lexie realizes she likes Axl, after denying his implications for several weeks. Because Axl is with April, she does not act on her feelings. However, after one date with Sean Donahue, Lexie tells Sue she thinks she wants more of a "bad boy". She ultimately reveals to Sue that she really really likes Axl in the season 8 episode "Swing and a Miss". Axl returns her feelings by kissing her in "The Par-Tay". They date in secret in "The Confirmation" and then by the end of the episode, their relationship is public knowledge. In "The Final Final", they're shown to be happily together. They said their first "I Love You's" in "Mommapalooza". In this same episode, Lexie is annoyed that Axl will not let her spend frivolously on their dates, only to later learn that her parents cut her off to teach her responsibility. In season 9's "Great Heckspectations", Lexie is shown to be working as a waitress at a steak restaurant, apparently her first-ever job. In the future, she and Axl get married and have three sons who grow to be as irresponsible and moody as Axl once was.

=== Brick's friends ===
- Zack (Andrew J. Fishman in seasons 1–4; Carlin James in season 9; introduced in season 1) is Brick's friend from the socially challenged class. He has a tendency to behave like a cat, meowing and wearing oven mitts to prevent him from clawing at various objects. After season 4, Zack does not appear until making a cameo in the season 9 episode "Great Heckspectations", in which he along with Brick's other former classmates explains that he is cured of his condition.
- Scott (Aidan Potter, introduced in season 3) is Brick's friend from the socially challenged class. He only eats red foods and has bouts of anxiety with other colors. After season 4, he does not appear until making a cameo in the season 9 episode "Great Heckspectations", in which he along with Brick's other former classmates explains that he is cured of his condition.
- Henry (Devan Leos in seasons 1–3; Bryce Hurless in seasons 3–5; Cameron Gellman in season 9; introduced in season 1) is Brick's friend from the socially challenged class. He has a tendency to speak shouting and knock everything down. After season 5, he does not appear until making a cameo in the season 9 episode "Great Heckspectations", in which he along with Brick's other former classmates explains that he is cured of his condition.
- Theo (Jake Netter, introduced in season 3) is Brick's friend from the socially challenged class. He can not hold his bladder and needs to go to the bathroom every moment. After season 5, he does not appear.
- Corey (Mason Cook, introduced in season 1) is Brick's friend from the socially challenged class. He is complexed with his socks, which cannot be misaligned or sweaty, because this can cause him to become very upset. After season 4, he does not appear.
- Arlo (Nick Shafer, introduced in season 2) is a friend Brick meets during the second season. He has an obsession with keeping everything on a schedule and takes frequent and lengthy bathroom breaks in the episode "Mother's Day II" when he is accompanying the Hecks to Brown County. He appears only in season two.
- Cynthia Violet "Cindy" Hornberger (Casey Burke, seasons 6–9) is a classmate of Brick's who becomes his girlfriend in season 6. Though she stands taller than Brick, she seems as quirky as he is. She always wears a safari hat, her facial expression shows no emotion, and, since she finds Brick's missing shoe in her first appearance, it is heavily implied that the character is named for Cinderella. Cindy is very brief and direct in her communication. In the season seven episode "Find my Hecks" Cindy states her IEP describes her as being incapable of irony, overly literal, and flat of affect, with a diagnostic code of 9b37, which may be a reference to disability codes related to the IEP. She has stated in multiple episodes that her favorite food is shrimp. Cindy's flaky parents are introduced in the season 7 episode "Crushed", when they ask the Hecks for a significant loan to save their house from foreclosure. The Hecks are not able to help, forcing Cindy's family to move in with her grandparents. This seemingly ends her relationship with Brick, until it is shown that her grandparents live only a block away. In season 8's "The Final Final", Brick is elated to learn that Cindy's doctor told her she has likely stopped growing. Cindy and Brick briefly break up early in season 9, but are back together as of the episode "The 200th". Cindy is finally shown without her hat in season 9's "Great Heckspectations", stating her mother forbade her from wearing a hat to the prom. The series finale has a flash-forward about Brick's future career and he's wearing a wedding ring, but it is not mentioned if he stays with Cindy. In Season 7's "Halloween VI: Tick Tock Death" Brick's narration leaves this ambiguous as he might have just imagined it because he ate too much candy, but it is suggested that Brick and Cindy are married in the future with four children.
- Troy Tangeroa (Jovan Armand, introduced in season 7) is Brick's large classmate who initially protects him from school bullies, then later becomes his friend. When the football team recruits Troy, Brick fears they will lose touch, but Troy later surprises Brick by showing up for his Font Club meeting.

=== Axl's love interests ===
- Morgan Edwards (Alexa PenaVega, Season 1) is a basketball cheerleader at Orson High that Axl briefly develops a relationship with. Her first appearance is "The Break-Up" where she is dating Axl and they're very happy until Morgan gets bored and ends things with him, breaking his heart. He tries to make a grand gesture at the basketball game in order to win her back by making the winning shot for her, but the clock runs out and he loses the game as a result instead. Her second and final appearance is in "Worry Duty" where she and Axl get back together and Sue also tries to become friends with her to elevate her own status, but Morgan's micro-managing Axl all the time to the point that Frankie not only imagines attacking her across the table at one point, but then eventually throws a cookie at her head to knock her down at another point too. She and Axl continue on-and-off for a time until Axl starts eyeing another girl and their relationship officially ends after that.
- Courtney and Debbie (Brittany Ross and Natalie Lander, introduced in season 3) are airheaded, think-alike cheerleaders in Axl and Sue's high school who date Axl as one. Because the two are inseparable, Axl struggles to figure out which one is his real girlfriend and which one is just hanging out with the other. He makes a calculated guess that Courtney is his girlfriend and kisses her, which causes both girls to slap him and break up with him. They perpetually overlook Sue, often thinking she is a new exchange student, and later calling her a freshman during her senior year. In season 7, Courtney and Debbie are now assistant cheerleading coaches at Orson High and they no longer like each other. In Season 9's "The 200th", they appear at the ceremony celebrating Orson and give a speech about going into business together.
- Cassidy Finch (Galadriel Stineman, introduced in season 4) is Axl's girlfriend in his senior year of high school. She met Axl when he was trying to boost his grades and needed a tutor. They did not get along very well in their first session, but then Axl kissed her and soon found out she had a boyfriend. She later broke up with her old boyfriend to be with Axl. Late in season 4, Cassidy's ex-boyfriend returns, putting tension between Axl and Cassidy for a while before they come back together. They break up in the episode "Hallelujah Hoedown", after Cassidy reveals she is going away in three weeks for an internship program and that they will be in different colleges come September. They begin speaking again in "The Award" (season 5), after Cassidy leaves an embarrassing message on Axl's voicemail. After a brief reconnection during spring break, Cassidy breaks up with Axl again, saying it is not fair to either of them to pursue a relationship while being 800 miles apart.
- Devin Levin (Gia Mantegna, seasons 6–8) is a relative of Frankie's hairdresser who was only an acquaintance of Axl's in the past. In season 6, he notices how she has blossomed and that they share many interests, and they begin dating. The two briefly break up when Devin notices that Axl still has her listed as "Uggo from Idaho" in his cell phone contacts, but they get back together later on. Early in season 7, they break up again, each agreeing they should see other people during their college years.
- April Heck (Greer Grammer, season 8) is Axl's love interest, whom he meets offscreen between seasons 7 and 8. April is beautiful and sweet, but not very smart. Frankie immediately tells Axl he can do better, causing a rift between mother and son. Mike initially likes April, but later has a conversation with Axl in which he calls her "dumb as a box of hammers". Defiant, Axl marries April in a civil service. After both sets of parents find out, the marriage is annulled. Axl briefly continues to date his ex-wife, but later breaks up with April in order to pursue Lexie.

=== Sue's love interests ===
- Matt (Moisés Arias, introduced in season 3) is a boy on the wrestling team at Orson High who likes Sue; he becomes Sue's first real boyfriend but eventually ends the relationship after moving away and falling for another girl. In season 4, Matt asks Sue to the school Valentine's Day dance because he broke up with his girlfriend Sherrie. He later calls Sue at the last minute to say that he and Sherrie got back together, and he is no longer taking her to the dance. This paves the way for Darrin to swoop in and save the day for Sue.
- Derrick Glossner (David Chandler) Sue's neighbor who has feelings for her. He kisses her multiple times in season 5 and confesses to her the reason he is mean is because he likes her, and he wants to better himself to be the man she deserves. In season 9 when Sue breaks into the Glossner home to retrieve a snow globe they stole, he confesses he still has feelings for her. Sue tells him she is in love with someone else (Sean Donahue), causing him to throw the snow globe, which Sue is able to retrieve.
- Logan (David Hull, introduced in season 6) is a guy from another high school who works as a shirtless model in the Abercrombie & Fitch store at the same mall where Sue works. He asks Sue to her prom after seeing her depressed over breaking up with Darrin, and he later reveals that he likes her. The two later try to connect during a chance encounter at East Indiana State, but Sue had taken Brick along that day, and he gets lost. Finally, Logan and Sue meet at a movie theater, where Logan says he is majoring in Religious Studies and plans to be a priest, disappointing Sue.
- Jeremy (Will Green, introduced in season 7) is a hardcore environmentalist and anti-capitalist whom Sue first meets when he is chained to a tree on campus. The two briefly date, but Sue breaks up with Jeremy early in season 8.
- Tyler (Keaton Savage, season 7) is the boy who drives the safe ride cart on the East Indiana State campus. He becomes Sue's brief love interest in season 8, until she spends most of their first date talking about Sean Donahue.
- Aidan (Jackson White, introduced in season 9) delivers food to Lexie and Sue's apartment on the evening when Sean Donahue is supposed to set up Sue with a blind date. In reality, Sean was going to surprise Sue by being her mystery date, but Sue assumes that Aidan is actually whom Sean sent. They go on an accidental date that evening, and Aidan later surprises Sue at the Hecks' New Year's Eve party, where he kisses her at midnight (thwarting Sean's plans to kiss Sue). Aidan is very clumsy and keeps accidentally injuring Sue, causing her to try to break up with him, but Brad begs her not to end the relationship until he has a chance to ask out Aidan's bandmate Luke. By the time Brad and Luke hit it off, Sue realizes how similar she and Aidan are and decides they should stay together, only to break up with him in "Toasted".

=== School staff ===
- Mrs. Tompkins (Krista Braun, introduced in season 1) is Brick's social skills mentor and guidance counselor.
- Mr. Farrar (Christopher Darga, introduced in season 3) is a teacher at Orson High.
- Mr. Walker (Sam Lloyd, introduced in season 4) is one of Brick's teachers.
- Dr. Fulton (Dave Foley, seasons 4–6, 8 & 9) is the school therapist. He is an odd character who helps Brick bond with his peers and try to fit in more at school. An insecure man himself, Dr. Fulton is obsessed with his ex-wife Shelly, whom he mentions nearly every time Brick talks to him for "help". In season 8, he tells Brick he is dating a 68-year-old woman named Barbara, whom he prefers to call "Shelly". In season 9's "Thank You for Not Kissing", he tells Mike and Frankie that Shelly took him back, proudly proclaiming his "years of stalking" finally paid off.
- Principal Cameron (French Stewart, introduced in season 4) is the principal at Orson High.
- Coach Tink Babbitt (Brooke Dillman, introduced in season 5) is a physical education teacher, volleyball coach and detention monitor at Orson High. In the season 8 episode "Swing and a Miss", Mike hires Tink as a part-time assistant at the quarry, solely for the purpose of making her eligible to play on the quarry's softball team.

=== Religious leaders ===
- Reverend Timothy "Tim-Tom" Thomas (Paul Hipp, introduced in season 1), is a youth minister at the Hecks' church whom Sue deeply admires. He surprised Sue by remembering her name after only having met her once, and always seems to appear just when Sue needs help the most. He is known for frequently playing his acoustic guitar and making almost anything into a song. He plays guitar with Axl on one occasion when encouraging him to do the right thing. In season 5, Reverend Tim-Tom gets a girlfriend (Reverend Tammy, played by Casey Wilson). Sue takes a disliking to Tammy and is not sure how to tell Reverend Tim-Tom, but Sue changes her mind about Tammy after the two talk. In a flash-forward in the series finale, Reverend Tim-Tom officiates the marriage of Sue and Sean.
- Reverend Haver (Dierk Torsek, introduced in season 1) is the pastor at the Hecks' church.

== Notable guest stars ==
- Brooke Shields as Mrs. Glossner(season 1)
- Amy Sedaris as Abby Michaels (season 1)
- Betty White as Mrs. Nethercott (season 1)
- Alexa PenaVega as Morgan Edwards (season 1)
- Doris Roberts as Mrs. Rinsky (season 2)
- Chord Overstreet as Mr. Wilkerson (season 3)
- Ray Romano as Nicky Kohlbrenner (season 3)
- Molly Shannon as Frankie's sister Janet (seasons 3 & 4)
- Brandon Scott as Cory (season 3)
- Ed Asner as Ben (season 3)
- Richard Gant as Pastor Watkins (season 3)
- Whoopi Goldberg as Ms. Jane Marsh (season 3)
- Rick Harrison as Rick (season 4)
- Jane Kaczmarek as Sandy Arnwood (season 4)
- David Koechner as Jeff Webber (season 4)
- Roger Rees as Mr. Glover (season 4)
- Carolyn Hennesy as Connie McDonald (season 4)
- Marion Ross as Ms. Dunlap (season 4)
- Rachel Dratch as Principal Barker (season 5)
- Keegan-Michael Key as Reverend Deveaux (season 5)
- Casey Wilson as Reverend Tammy (season 5)
- Nicole Sullivan as Vicki (season 5)
- Mindy Cohn as Kimberly (season 5)
- Richard Kind as Dr. Niller (season 6)
- Kirstie Alley as Pam Staggs (season 6)
- Dick Van Dyke as Paul "Dutch" Spence (season 6)
- Faith Ford as Sheila (season 7)
- Cheryl Hines as Dr. Sommer Samuelson (season 7)
- Josh Cooke as Nick Grant (season 7)
- Alan Ruck as Jack Kershaw (season 7)
- Monica Horan as Anna Ferguson (season 8)
- Alan Rachins as Mort (season 8)
- Lisa Rinna as Tammy Brooks (season 9)
- Gregory Harrison as Bennett Brooks (season 9)
