= The Middle season 8 =

The Middle
- Season 8
- Region 1 DVD cover art
- Starring: Patricia Heaton; Neil Flynn; Charlie McDermott; Eden Sher; Atticus Shaffer
- No. of episodes: 23

Release
- Original network: ABC
- Original release: October 11, 2016 – May 16, 2017

Season chronology
- ← Previous; Season 7 Next → Season 9

The eighth season of the television comedy series The Middle began airing on October 11, 2016, on ABC in the United States. It is produced by Blackie and Blondie Productions and Warner Bros. Television with series creators DeAnn Heline and Eileen Heisler as executive producers. The season contains 23 episodes. The season concluded on May 16, 2017.

The show is about a working-class family, led by Frances "Frankie" Heck (Patricia Heaton), a middle-aged, Midwestern woman married to Michael "Mike" Heck (Neil Flynn), who reside in the small, fictional town of Orson, Indiana. They are the parents of three children, Axl (Charlie McDermott), Sue (Eden Sher) and Brick (Atticus Shaffer).

== Cast ==
=== Main cast ===
- Patricia Heaton as Frankie Heck
- Neil Flynn as Mike Heck
- Charlie McDermott as Axl Heck
- Eden Sher as Sue Heck
- Atticus Shaffer as Brick Heck

=== Recurring ===
- Daniela Bobadilla as Lexie Brooks, Sue's college roommate and best friend and Axl's new girlfriend as of "The Par-Tay."
- Alphonso McAuley as Charles "Hutch" Hutchinson, Axl's teammate, best friend, and college roommate.
- Tommy Bechtold as Kenny, Axl and Hutch's friend and roommate.
- Greer Grammer as April, Axl's cute but very very dimwitted girlfriend whom he met over the summer. They briefly married before getting an annulment. They remain a couple until breaking up in the episode "Exes and Ohhhs".
- Casey Burke as Cindy Hornberger, Brick's quirky girlfriend.
- Jen Ray as Nancy Donahue, the Hecks' neighbor and Frankie's best friend.
- Sean O'Bryan as Ron Donahue, Nancy's husband and a friend of the Hecks.
- Beau Wirick as Sean Donahue, Axl's best friend from high school.
- Pat Finn as Bill Norwood, a friend and neighbor of the Hecks.
- Jovan Armand as Troy, Brick's classmate and friend.
- Paul Hipp as Reverend Tim-Tom, a youth pastor at the Hecks' church

=== Guest ===
- Dave Foley as Dr. Chuck Fulton, Brick's therapist.
- Brooke Shields as Rita Glossner, the Hecks' uncouth and troubled neighbor.
- Emily Rutherfurd as Dierdre Peterson, the Hecks' neighbor who has four children.
- Norm Macdonald as Rusty Heck, Mike's brother.
- John Cullum as "Big Mike" Heck, Mike's father.
- Jack McBrayer as Dr. Ted Goodwin, Frankie's over-friendly boss who is oblivious to sarcasm.
- Gia Mantegna as Devin Levin, Frankie's hairdresser's relative and Axl's college classmate/ex-girlfriend. They break up when Devin thinks they should see others.
- Galadriel Stineman as Cassidy Finch, Axl's ex-girlfriend who broke up with him when they went to different colleges.
- Katlin Mastandrea as "Weird Ashley" Wyman, Axl's weird classmate who has been his accidental date to prom.
- Monica Horan as Anna Ferguson, the matriarch of the Fergusons who accidentally took Brick home when he was a baby (while the Hecks made off with the Ferguson kid).
  - Horan also played Amy Barone, who was Heaton's sister-in-law on her previous sitcom, Everybody Loves Raymond.
- Alan Rachins as Mort, a clothing store clerk where Frankie and Axl go to buy a suit.

== Episodes ==
| No. overall | No. in season | Title | Directed by | Written by | Original release date (Note: The first 12 episodes of season eight were broadcast one day earlier in Canada.) | Prod. code | U.S. viewers (millions) |
|---|---|---|---|---|---|---|---|
| 169 | 1 | "The Core Group" | Lee Shallat Chemel | Ilana Wernick | October 11, 2016 | T12.15251 | 6.78 |
Brick starts high school and decides he wants to change his image. Axl brings home a girl named April that he's been seeing, and Frankie notices that she's not exactly the brightest. The next day Frankie cooks a family dinner, but April, Cindy, and Sue's new boyfriend Jeremy also show up. This gives Frankie a glimpse into the family's future, making her worry that their "core group" will soon be no more.
| 170 | 2 | "A Tough Pill to Swallow" | Phil Traill | Rich Dahm | October 18, 2016 | T12.15252 | 6.02 |
Axl and Hutch get into an argument because Axl keeps taking their motor home off-campus to visit April; while Brick struggles to swallow a pill for his ear infection, having never taken medication in pill form before. Meanwhile, Sue tries to get reinstated into college when she discovers she never renewed her tuition.
| 171 | 3 | "Halloween VII: The Heckoning" | Lee Shallat Chemel | Tim Hobert | October 25, 2016 | T12.15253 | 5.72 |
Frankie is both surprised and annoyed to hear the kids would rather live with Mike if they ever divorced. Axl begins lashing out at his family after spending so much time acting nice around April. Meanwhile, Sue tries to reclaim her room back from Brick.
| 172 | 4 | "True Grit" | Victor Nelli Jr. | Jana Hunter & Mitch Hunter | November 1, 2016 | T12.15254 | 5.43 |
Frankie accidentally buys underwear with a sexy saying on the bottom. When she goes to return the item, the young salesperson angers Frankie with comments about her age, so Frankie instead buys more panties with similar sayings. Brick worries about losing a friend when the school's football coach recruits Troy. Meanwhile, Sue tries to break up with Jeremy and enlists Axl's help, while Axl vainly implies that Lexie has a crush on him.
| 173 | 5 | "Roadkill" | Lee Shallat Chemel | Roy Brown | November 15, 2016 | T12.15255 | 6.21 |
Brick turns 15 and insists that his parents to teach him to drive, as Axl learned at 15, but his erratic driving scares both parents so Axl lets him learn on the RV. When Brick knocks over the huge polyurethane "Orson Cow" during a nighttime driving lesson, Axl convinces his brother they must cover up the crime. Sue struggles to pick a college major before the deadline, and learns a surprising secret from Frankie.
| 174 | 6 | "Thanksgiving VIII" | Elliot Hegarty | Ilana Wernick | November 22, 2016 | T12.15256 | 6.88 |
Frankie fumes when Axl announces that he'll be with April's family for three different Thanksgiving meals, forcing Frankie to arrange a Heck family meal at 8:00 AM. On the eve of Thanksgiving, Brick and Sue also admit that they don't like April and even Mike gets mad when he learns Axl won't be back home Thanksgiving night to watch the Colts game with him. Amidst the verbal jabs, Axl walks in. Frankie finally tells him that he can do way better than April, causing Axl to leave and not return. Sue flips out when she learns that Brick will now become her new co-worker at Spudsy's.
| 175 | 7 | "Look Who's Not Talking" | Lee Shallat Chemel | Tim Hobert | November 29, 2016 | T12.15257 | 6.62 |
Several days after the Thanksgiving incident, Axl still refuses to talk to Frankie, who continues to fume. Mike visits Axl and tries to get him to relent, but is unsuccessful. The family problems trigger one of Brick's quirks, which gets him in trouble at school and earns him a meeting with Dr. Fulton. Frankie finds a store that sells misshapen produce. Brad visits Sue at campus, and later admits that he dropped out of NYU as he didn't fit in.
| 176 | 8 | "Trip and Fall" | Elliot Hegarty | Rich Dahm | December 6, 2016 | T12.15258 | 6.06 |
Mike trips and falls when going down the stairs at the quarry. He just wants to forget the embarrassing incident, but the fall has ruined the quarry's streak of accident-free days and causes a safety trainer to be sent to the site. Frankie goes on an unintended road trip with Rita Glossner. Axl finds out April's family does not like him. At the end of the episode, he reveals to a shocked Sue that he and April got married.
| 177 | 9 | "A Very Marry Christmas" | Lee Shallat Chemel | Jana Hunter & Mitch Hunter | December 13, 2016 | T12.15259 | 6.39 |
Axl finally decides to return home and tell Frankie that he got married but, when he arrives, Frankie is so overjoyed to see him that he delays breaking the news, Frankie ultimately learns the truth when April's parents call, causing her and Mike to convince Axl to get the marriage annulled. Elsewhere, Brick does such a great job babysitting neighbor Deirdre's three children that the kids constantly come knocking for him. Also, Mike doesn't know how to reciprocate when Bill Norwood gives him an unexpected Christmas gift.
| 178 | 10 | "Escape Orson" | Jaffar Mahmood | Roy Brown | January 3, 2017 | T12.15260 | 6.62 |
New Year's Day finds the Hecks lamenting that they did nothing special over the holidays, until Frankie finds an about-to-expire pass to an escape room. While leaving, the family runs into the Donahues, who brag about their record time escaping the room. This makes Frankie more determined than ever and she is confident they can beat the Donahues' time, as Sue is good at puzzle games. She later confesses to Axl that she cheated during all the family games she won. The Hecks are joined by a man named Milt in the escape room, being short of the minimum number of participants, and earns them extra time needed to win the game. Brick becomes convinced that Milt is really David S. Rosenthal, author of the Planet Nowhere books. Frankie also reveals to Mike that she had a romantic dream that involved Frank Sinatra.
| 179 | 11 | "Hoosier Maid" | Elliot Hegarty | Bruce Rasmussen | January 10, 2017 | T12.15261 | 7.30 |
Frankie is ecstatic when she wins a month's worth of free maid service. Unfortunately, she discovers that good help is hard to find. Mike learns that his father is now using a cane and can't get himself upstairs, so he and Rusty try to get him into a home, much to his annoyance. When it gets too chilly to sleep in the Winnebago due to a hole in the roof, Axl, Hutch and Kenny move into "The Bin", and later get themselves and Sue and Lexie kicked out. Meanwhile, Lexie realizes that she likes Axl, and finally lets her father move her and Sue into a fancy apartment.
| 180 | 12 | "Pitch Imperfect" | Melissa Kosar | Rich Dahm | January 17, 2017 | T12.15262 | 6.67 |
Axl panics when he realizes that he only has four months until he graduates from college, but he hasn't sent out any job résumés – something he should have started when he was a junior and Brick desperately seeks his parents' advice when Cindy tells him he reads too much and that she'll break up with him if they don't do more things together. Brad joins Sue's no-cut acapella team, and the two of them have to improvise when most of the team panic and quit before a big competition.
| 181 | 13 | "Ovary and Out" | Elliot Hegarty | Ilana Wernick | February 7, 2017 | T12.15263 | 6.42 |
Frankie becomes sad when her doctor informs her that her ovaries are shriveled up and her childbearing years are over. Mike tries to cheer her up by borrowing Dierdre's infant overnight, which puts some perspective on being an older parent and Brick must hone his font knowledge when he meets Gibson, a worthy opponent who joins Brick's club at school. Meanwhile, Sue and Axl are shocked when romantic sparks seem to fly between Sean and Lexie.
| 182 | 14 | "Sorry Not Sorry" | Phil Traill | Tim Hobert | February 14, 2017 | T12.15264 | 6.32 |
Brick witnesses Mike and Frankie fighting under stress when the pipes in the basement suddenly burst and they have to fix the problem. He asks Axl and Sue to host an intervention for their parents. Mike and Frankie are initially remorseful about how they made Brick feel, but later decide it's the kids' fault. Ultimately, everyone learns that they need to improve themselves.
| 183 | 15 | "Dental Hijinks" | Lee Shallat Chemel | Jana Hunter & Mitch Hunter | February 21, 2017 | T12.15265 | 6.27 |
Mike does all he can to avoid getting a tooth problem fixed, which includes involving Dr. Goodwin in a series of lies to keep Frankie at bay. Axl, Hutch, and Kenny try to sell the Winnebago. Brick starts writing a Scottish musical in the style of Hamilton. Sue decides to pursue Tyler (Keaton Savage), the golf cart transportation guy on campus.
| 184 | 16 | "Swing and a Miss" | Danny Salles | Roy Brown | March 7, 2017 | T12.15266 | 6.12 |
The quarry softball team is on a losing streak, so Mike hires Coach Tink Babbitt as a ringer. The team starts winning, but Tink takes over and benches Mike. Also, Nancy Donahue exclaims that Frankie must be very proud of one of her family members' achievements, but Frankie is clueless. She eventually finds out that it's because Brick made it into the National Honors Society. Lexie spends Spring Break at the Hecks, and Sue finds out about Lexie's crush on Axl. Back at school after break, Axl seeks out Lexie at a St. Patrick's Day party, but runs into Devin Levin instead.
| 185 | 17 | "Exes and Ohhhs" | Lee Shallat Chemel | Rich Dahm | March 14, 2017 | T12.15267 | 5.92 |
Axl runs into nearly all of his ex-girlfriends while attending a St. Patrick's Day party, including Devin Levin, Cassidy, and even Weird Ashley. Hutch tells Axl that the universe is trying to tell him something about his love life and that he must speak with each of them to try and figure it out. In the fallout, Axl breaks up with April. Meanwhile, Brick purchases an old microfiche machine from a library sale and finds a "scandalous" local news article about Frankie from 1983. Meanwhile, Sean offers to take Sue to the Chancellor's Ball, unaware she already has a date.
| 186 | 18 | "The Par-tay" | Jaffar Mahmood | Ilana Wernick | April 4, 2017 | T12.15268 | 5.44 |
Bill Norwood is so upset with Mike for poaching his plumber at a reduced rate that their friendship could be at risk. Elsewhere, Brick convinces Axl to let him hang out with him at college over the weekend, not to visit the library, but to have some fun and party. Frankie is upset when Sue, who tells her everything, won't open up to her about the guy she's crushing on. With Brick's encouragement, Axl works up the nerve to pursue Lexie romantically.
| 187 | 19 | "The Confirmation" | Charlie McDermott | Tim Hobert | April 11, 2017 | T12.15269 | 5.29 |
After being reminded that Brick was never confirmed, Frankie and Mike send him to Reverend Tim-Tom's Wilderness Jesus Jam weekend camp to brush up on his religious knowledge in preparation for the blessed event. Brick is shocked to discover that his bunkmate is Blake Ferguson, the boy he was switched with at birth and was raised by Frankie and Mike for the first month of his life. Meanwhile, Axl and Lexie try to keep their new relationship a secret, while Sue and Brad try to cheer Lexie up, believing she's still hung up over Axl.
| 188 | 20 | "Adult Swim" | Lee Shallat Chemel | Jana Hunter & Mitch Hunter | April 18, 2017 | T12.15270 | 5.25 |
After discovering that he doesn't have a decent suit to wear for upcoming business interviews, Frankie is thrilled when Axl agrees to let her take him shopping and help him pick out a suit. When Mike threatens to tear down the family backyard pool if Brick and Sue don't start using it, they begins to worry that he and Frankie may get rid of more things around the house from their childhood they don’t use anymore, as they edge towards adulthood.
| 189 | 21 | "Clear and Present Danger" | Phil Traill | Roy Brown | May 2, 2017 | T12.15271 | 5.07 |
Frankie has trouble remembering where she hid Axl's graduation gift, which she bought and put away a long time ago. When she does find it, it turns out to be not as special as she thought it was. Axl trains Brick to become physically stronger after Cindy has to save Brick from a bully. Axl realizes during the process that he's not as physically fit as he was when he was training for football. Sue organizes a surprise birthday video for Mike, which does not go over well with her stoic father and results in hurt feelings. Mike eventually makes amends with her when he opens up to her about his own mother.
| 190 | 22 | "The Final Final" | Lee Shallat Chemel | Rich Dahm | May 9, 2017 | T12.15272 | 5.02 |
After missing his final college test before he graduates, Axl pleads with his teacher to let him take it anyway. Meanwhile, Frankie, Mike and Brick all hit a stretch of good luck, and owe it to the Donahues' address number being accidentally painted on their curb. Sue admits to Brad that her sophomore year was a letdown. An opportunity to speak to Orson High students briefly lifts her spirits, until it makes her realize that she was a nerd in her high school years.
| 191 | 23 | "Fight or Flight" | Eileen Heisler | Ilana Wernick | May 16, 2017 | T12.15273 | 5.27 |
After Kenny develops successful apps that will let him retire within one year, he asks Axl to travel through Europe with him for three months, with Kenny paying for the trip. Mike is staunchly against the idea, saying Axl needs to grow up and start looking for a job at home, while Frankie sees it as Axl getting a rare opportunity that she and Mike never had. It is revealed that Mike really wanted to spend one last summer with Axl. Brick seeks out his old lawn chair after experiencing back pain. Elsewhere, Sue accidentally backs into another vehicle while at the store, and leaves a note despite barely leaving a scratch. When the owner doesn't call back right away, a panicked Sue returns to the scene and leaves more notes.

== Ratings ==
Viewership and ratings per episode of The Middle season 8
| No. | Title | Air date | Rating/share (18–49) | Viewers (millions) | DVR (18–49) | Total (18–49) |
|---|---|---|---|---|---|---|
| 1 | "The Core Group" | October 11, 2016 | 1.8/7 | 6.78 | —N/a | —N/a |
| 2 | "A Tough Pill to Swallow" | October 18, 2016 | 1.5/6 | 6.02 | —N/a | —N/a |
| 3 | "Halloween VIII: The Heckoning" | October 25, 2016 | 1.5/6 | 5.72 | 0.7 | 2.2 |
| 4 | "True Grit" | November 1, 2016 | 1.4/5 | 5.43 | 0.6 | 2.0 |
| 5 | "Roadkill" | November 15, 2016 | 1.6/6 | 6.21 | 0.7 | 2.3 |
| 6 | "Thanksgiving VIII" | November 22, 2016 | 1.6/6 | 6.88 | 0.7 | 2.3 |
| 7 | "Look Who's Not Talking" | November 29, 2016 | 1.6/6 | 6.62 | —N/a | —N/a |
| 8 | "Trip and Fall" | December 6, 2016 | 1.4/5 | 6.06 | 0.7 | 2.1 |
| 9 | "A Very Marry Christmas" | December 13, 2016 | 1.6/6 | 6.39 | 0.7 | 2.3 |
| 10 | "Escape Orson" | January 3, 2017 | 1.7/6 | 6.62 | —N/a | —N/a |
| 11 | "Hoosier Maid" | January 10, 2017 | 1.7/6 | 7.30 | 0.7 | 2.4 |
| 12 | "Pitch Imperfect" | January 17, 2017 | 1.7/6 | 6.67 | —N/a | —N/a |
| 13 | "Ovary and Out" | February 7, 2017 | 1.6/6 | 6.42 | 0.6 | 2.2 |
| 14 | "Sorry Not Sorry" | February 14, 2017 | 1.5/6 | 6.32 | —N/a | —N/a |
| 15 | "Dental Hijinks" | February 21, 2017 | 1.5/6 | 6.27 | —N/a | —N/a |
| 16 | "Swing and a Miss" | March 7, 2017 | 1.5/5 | 6.12 | —N/a | —N/a |
| 17 | "Exes and Ohhhs" | March 14, 2017 | 1.6/6 | 5.92 | —N/a | —N/a |
| 18 | "The Par-tay" | April 4, 2017 | 1.4/6 | 5.44 | 0.6 | 2.0 |
| 19 | "The Confirmation" | April 11, 2017 | 1.3/5 | 5.29 | TBD | TBD |
| 20 | "Adult Swim" | April 18, 2017 | 1.3/5 | 5.25 | TBD | TBD |
| 21 | "Clear and Present Danger" | May 2, 2017 | 1.2/5 | 5.07 | 0.6 | 1.8 |
| 22 | "The Final Final" | May 9, 2017 | 1.2/5 | 5.02 | 0.6 | 1.8 |
| 23 | "Fight or Flight" | May 16, 2017 | 1.2/5 | 5.27 | TBD | TBD |
