= The Middle season 9 =

The Middle
- Season 9
- Region 1 DVD cover art
- Starring: Patricia Heaton; Neil Flynn; Charlie McDermott; Eden Sher; Atticus Shaffer
- No. of episodes: 24

Release
- Original network: ABC
- Original release: October 3, 2017 – May 22, 2018

Season chronology
- ← Previous; Season 8

The ninth and final season of the television comedy series The Middle began on October 3, 2017, on ABC in the United States. It was produced by Blackie and Blondie Productions and Warner Bros. Television with series creators DeAnn Heline and Eileen Heisler as executive producers. On August 2, 2017, it was announced that the ninth season would be the series' last, at the request of the series' creators. The season was dubbed as "The Farewell Season" and ran for 24 episodes.

The show is about a working-class family led by Frances "Frankie" Heck (Patricia Heaton), a middle-aged Midwestern woman married to Michael "Mike" Heck (Neil Flynn), who resides in the small fictional town of Orson, Indiana. The town of Orson is based in Jasper, Indiana. Frankie and Mike are the parents of three children, Axl (Charlie McDermott), Sue (Eden Sher), and Brick (Atticus Shaffer). The series concluded with a one-hour series finale on May 22, 2018. Although a spin-off was being developed, ABC abandoned the project in November 2018.

== Cast ==
=== Main ===
- Patricia Heaton as Frankie Heck
- Neil Flynn as Mike Heck
- Charlie McDermott as Axl Heck
- Eden Sher as Sue Heck
- Atticus Shaffer as Brick Heck

=== Recurring ===
- Brock Ciarlelli as Brad Bottig
- Daniela Bobadilla as Lexie Brooks
- Beau Wirick as Sean Donahue
- Pat Finn as Bill Norwood
- Casey Burke as Cindy Hornberger
- Jen Ray as Nancy Donahue
- Alphonso McAuley as Charles "Hutch" Hutchinson
- Sean O'Bryan as Ron Donahue

=== Guest ===
- Jackson White as Aidan, Sue's unintended romantic interest
- Jonathan Goldstein as Mark Beckett, Sue's statistics professor
- Paul Hipp as Reverend Tim-Tom, the youth pastor at the Hecks' church
- Lisa Rinna as Tammy Brooks, Lexie's mother
- Gregory Harrison as Bennett Brooks, Lexie's father
- French Stewart as Principal Cameron
- Maree Cheatham as Sylvia Hammond-Tucker, the main suspect in the death of her sister, a woman whom Frankie and Brick believed was murdered
- Marsha Mason as Pat Spence, Frankie's mother
- Jimmy Bellinger as Edwin, the manager at Spudsy's, where Sue (currently) and Axl and Brick (formerly) have all worked
- Brenna D'Amico as Lilah, Brick's new crush at school
- Brian Doyle-Murray as Don Ehlert, the owner of the car dealership where Frankie used to work
- Brittany Ross and Natalie Lander as Courtney and Debbie, airheaded cheerleaders who dated Axl as one in high school
- John Cullum as Michael "Big Mike" Heck Sr., Mike's father
- Blaine Saunders as Carly, Sue's best friend since middle school
- Corbin Bleu as Luke, Aidan's friend and bandmate
- Norm Macdonald as Rusty Heck, Mike's brother
- Tommy Bechtold as Kenny, Axl's former college roommate and friend
- Rose Abdoo as Jodie "Mrs. K" Kozicki, Brick's health teacher
- Malcolm Foster Smith as Dave, a worker at Mike's quarry
- Troy Metcalf as Jim, a worker at Mike's quarry
- Greg Cipes as Chuck, a worker at Mike's quarry
- Brooke Shields as Rita Glossner, mother of the reckless Glossner boys who terrorize the Hecks' neighborhood
- Wade Chandler as Derrick Glossner
- Gibson Bobby Sjobeck as Diaper Glossner
- Dave Foley as Dr. Fulton, Brick's therapist and counselor at school
- Jack McBrayer as Dr. Ted Goodwin, a dentist and Frankie's current employer
- Peter Breitmayer as Pete Miller, Frankie's former workmate who is the top salesman at Ehlert Motors
- Aidan Potter as Scott, Brick's old friend from the socially-challenged group who has now outgrown his quirks
- Carlin James as Zack, Brick's old friend from the socially-challenged group who has now outgrown his quirks
- Cameron Gellman as Henry, Brick's old friend from the socially-challenged group who has now outgrown his quirks
- Katlin Mastandrea as "Weird" Ashley Wyman, Axl's accidental prom date in high school who has stalked him since then

== Episodes ==
No. overall	No. in season	Title	Directed by	Written by	Original release date	Prod. code	U.S. viewers (millions)
192	1	"Vive La Hecks"	Lee Shallat-Chemel	Tim Hobert	October 3, 2017	T12.15651	6.21
Axl returns home from Europe with a new casual outlook on life, annoying Mike, who wants Axl to start looking for a job. Brick does not know if he should break up with Cindy before his sophomore year starts. Frankie tries to come up with the perfect item for their family's time capsule contribution that will be buried near the Orson cow. After working all summer, Sue tries to cram a whole summer into a few days.
193	2	"Please Don't Feed the Hecks"	Phil Traill	Ilana Wernick	October 10, 2017	T12.15652	5.93
Axl gets a job as a bus driver, which does not thrill Mike or Frankie because it is not a good use of his business degree. Brick wants Mike to do a presentation for his class on career day, as Frankie has been banned from school functions, but Mike staunchly refuses. Sue and Lexie return to their apartment after the summer, only to find out it has been sublet to a man who refuses to leave. At home, Frankie gives Nancy Donahue an old scarf that catches her eye and gets a fresh apple pie in return. This leads Frankie to see if she can unload more old junk on Nancy in exchange for home-cooked food.
194	3	"Meet the Parents"	Lee Shallat-Chemel	Jana Hunter & Mitch Hunter	October 17, 2017	T12.15653	5.53
Frankie and Mike meet Lexie's parents, Tammy and Bennett. While Frankie likes them, Mike says he feels like Bennett acts superior. Frankie later gets Mike to admit he is jealous and also embarrassed over not being able to give his family nice things. Meanwhile, Brick fakes being arrested for Sophomore Slammer weekend at Orson High. When no one bails him out, he calls Sue, who reveals that sophomore year isn't what he thinks it is.
195	4	"Halloween VIII: Orson Murder Mystery"	Phil Traill	Rich Dahm	October 24, 2017	T12.15654	5.80
Frankie and Brick become detectives after learning that a former resident of their home died in the bathtub. Clues lead them to the victim's sister Sylvia, who still lives in Orson, but all is not as it seems.
196	5	"Role of a Lifetime"	Lee Shallat-Chemel	Roy Brown	October 31, 2017	T12.15655	5.05
A discussion ensues about everyone's roles in the family, which escalates into an argument. It is only after Frankie gets a call that her mother is in the hospital that the family comes together, realizing they all need to draw upon each other's strengths. Meanwhile, Axl tries to invent a new beverage by mixing wine with beer, and Brick joins the school orchestra in an attempt to find a new girlfriend.
197	6	"The Setup"	Victor Nelli Jr.	Tim Hobert	November 7, 2017	T12.15656	5.63
Pat is staying at the Heck home to recover and starts getting on Frankie's nerves, while Axl and Brick stay up late trying to figure out what Mike does at the quarry. The latter causes Axl to be late to his bus route the next morning, and he gets fired after using the Winnebago to pick up the kids.
198	7	"Thanksgiving IX"	Phil Traill	Jana Hunter & Mitch Hunter	November 14, 2017	T12.15657	5.70
Soon after Axl begins working at Spudsy's, Edwin returns from a trip and says he needs to lay off one minimum wage employee, putting it on Axl, Sue and Brick to decide which one of them it should be. As the Hecks drive to Aunt Janet's house for Thanksgiving, incidents at a toll booth and a gas station cause the family to question what people have become, only to have their faith in humanity restored during a traffic jam.
199	8	"Eyes Wide Open"	Jaffar Mahmood	Rich Dahm	November 21, 2017	T12.15658	6.05
Brick meets a girl named Lilah (Brenna D'Amico) after school hours and learns she is a new student in his grade. Thinking they can become a couple, Brick invites Lilah to the house while trying to keep her from meeting any other students, but things change when Lilah receives threatening notes and Brick surmises they are from Cindy. Axl wants to change his slacker ways after visiting former college roommate Hutch at his apartment in Chicago and seeing how well his friend is doing. Alone in her apartment, Sue watches The Silence of the Lambs and is too scared to sleep; she calls Mike, who arrives to calm her down with a childhood bedtime ritual.
200	9	"The 200th"	Lee Shallat-Chemel	Roy Brown	December 5, 2017	T12.15659	5.78
The town celebrates as Orson finally makes the list of Top 200 Friendliest Places to Live in Indiana. Brick learns Cindy is interested in being his girlfriend again, but she says that, because he broke up with her in a cowardly manner, he must now perform three acts of bravery to win her back. Meanwhile, Mike has renewed appreciation for Frankie and family life after Bill Norwood tells him that he and Paula are separated. Elsewhere, Frankie continues to struggle trying to find items to put in the time capsule that will be buried near the new Orson cow. Axl has a job interview, and convinces a reluctant Sue to act as his assistant.
201	10	"The Christmas Miracle"	Lee Shallat-Chemel	Ilana Wernick	December 12, 2017	T12.15660	5.68
Frankie invites the Donahue family over for a "Yankee swap" gift exchange party followed by Christmas Eve service at the church, but Frankie is disappointed when Axl tells her that religion is no longer for him. Mike declares war on the Glossner boys after they keep defacing his new giant inflatable snowman. Brick tries to wrap his first Christmas present for the gift exchange. Sean is upset over his grades, and Sue tries to cheer him up, which leads to an unexpected moment.
202	11	"New Year's Revelations"	Lee Shallat-Chemel	Tim Hobert	January 2, 2018	T12.15661	6.36
Sue reveals to Frankie that she kissed Sean on Christmas, however, she is confused on whether he likes her. Frankie and Brad team up to make sure the two kiss at midnight on New Year's Day. Big Mike asks Mike to drive him somewhere and Mike brings Axl and Brick along. An unusually chatty Big Mike takes them to the country and the tree where he and his late wife first kissed. He then requests that they leave him there to die.
203	12	"The Other Man"	Victor Nelli Jr.	Jana Hunter & Mitch Hunter	January 9, 2018	T12.15662	5.42
Now that a more responsible Axl works a sales representative for a local plumbing supply store, he begins to bond with Mike and spends more time with him, so Frankie feels left out. To get back at them, she spends time with Brick, which leads to a bonding moment between the two. Sue decides to break up with Aidan, however, Brad asks her to hold off on doing so as he develops a crush on Aidan's friend Luke.
204	13	"Mommapalooza"	Phil Traill	Roy Brown	January 16, 2018	T12.15663	6.13
Frankie decides that she needs to find a new passion for "life's third act", so Reverend Tim-Tom (Paul Hipp) offers for her to tour with him. Meanwhile, after Axl refuses to let Lexie pay for their expensive dates, Lexie finds a way to fool him into thinking he has becoming lucky when money and other high priced things suddenly make their way into his hands. However, during Lexie's attempts to show Axl the rich life, she learns she is being cut off from her family's money supply, so Axl teaches her some of his family's tricks for getting by on a low budget. Meanwhile, Mike forces Sue and Brick to work together to fix the hole in the bedroom wall.
205	14	"Guess Who's Coming to Frozen Dinner"	Lee Shallat-Chemel	Ilana Wernick	February 6, 2018	T12.15664	5.63
Mike wants to bond with Sue, and when Rusty buys her an expensive necklace, Mike is suspicious. Axl blows the money from his first paycheck on a big screen television and blames his spending spree on years of living with Frankie's lack of financial wisdom. Meanwhile, Brick is stumped, but delighted, to discover mysterious unmarked gifts being left at the front door of the house, which he assumes to be from Cindy to him. It is later revealed that the gifts were from Sean to Sue.
206	15	"Toasted"	Lee Shallat-Chemel	A.J. Blum	February 27, 2018	T12.15665	5.23
Sue turns 21, and Frankie takes her to a bar to celebrate. While inebriated, the ladies cause enough of a commotion that, the next day, inspires a hung-over Sue never to drink again. Mike is forced to accompany Brick to a Planet Nowhere convention in Indianapolis, where anything negative he does warrants Brick to send a text to Frankie in order to have Mike reprimanded. Meanwhile, Axl and Hutch head to Ohio in the Winnebago to attend and make a toast at ex-college roommate Kenny's wedding. On the way, they open up to each other about their struggles with acting more maturely after college. When they arrive, they find that all 600 of Kenny's wedding guests are attending via videoconference.
207	16	"The Crying Game"	Phil Traill	Rich Dahm	March 13, 2018	T12.15666	4.80
After 25 years of working for the local quarry, Mike learns he has been offered the job of regional manager. However, his departure is taken rather hard by his coworkers. Meanwhile, Brick suspects that he is being treated unfairly by his health teacher because of how horribly Axl treated her back when he was a student. Back at home, after having a rough week, Frankie desperately wants to have a "good cry", but is continually interrupted.
208	17	"Hecks vs. Glossners: The Final Battle"	Elliot Hegarty	Tim Hobert	March 20, 2018	T12.15667	5.83
After the Glossners steal Sue's car, Frankie confronts Rita in the parking lot at the grocery store. Rita speeds away, and the Hecks are furious that the police will not intervene since they fear the Glossners. Out of options, the Hecks band together to fight the Glossners and get the car back. However, they soon realize they are outnumbered and recruit the rest of the neighborhood to help. During the battle, Mike tries teaching Axl how to kick down a door, believing it is one of seven skills every man should know; Sue tries to get the snow globe back, and runs into Derrick Glossner; and when Brick ends up with the car keys, he is finally allowed to drive. Most of the Glossner boys are sent to juvenile detention, with two sent back to school, and Rita becomes a much nicer person without her sons around.
209	18	"Thank You for Not Kissing"	Lee Shallat-Chemel	Jana Hunter & Mitch Hunter	April 3, 2018	T12.15668	8.38
Frankie and Mike get a call to visit Dr. Fulton at Orson High, who tells them he has received numerous complaints about Brick and Cindy making out at school. At home, Frankie finds numerous thank-you cards under Axl's bed that he started but never sent, causing her to insist that he finish and send them, no matter how long ago the gift.
210	19	"Bat Out of Heck"	Danny Salles	Ilana Wernick	April 10, 2018	T12.15669	7.52
Frankie keeps seeing something moving in the house, but no one else sees it. Axl needs the family car to visit customers and says he plans to sell the Winnebago to get his own car. This forces Frankie to ride to work with Dr. Goodwin. Frankie gets Dr. Goodwin to buy 25 boxes of peanut brittle that Brick is selling for school, but he later becomes angry when the peanut brittle is taking too long to be delivered. Elsewhere, Mike tries to coach Axl in the fine art of negotiating a car sale, to the point of taking over when they visit the dealer. Frankie's vision at home turns out to be real, as a bat starts flying around.
211	20	"Great Heckspectations"	Lee Shallat-Chemel	Roy Brown	May 1, 2018	T12.15670	6.15
Frankie insists that Brick ask Cindy to the prom, but her suggested "promposal" fails. Brick's original idea to ask Cindy does work and she accepts. Worried that Brick and Cindy will have no one to hang with at the prom, Frankie organizes a pre-prom party with Brick's old friends from the socially-challenged group, including Scott, Henry, and Zack. This backfires when it becomes apparent that those kids have outgrown their quirks while Brick still has not. Brick and Cindy enjoy a private prom at the Orson Public Library; Mike tells Frankie he is happy to have a child who does not think like everyone else. Mike has trouble with a new TV remote. Lexie talks Axl into giving Sue a belated 21st birthday present, however, Sue is disappointed when he can't come up with anything. She is later delighted to learn from Frankie that Axl doted on her when they were children.
212	21	"The Royal Flush"	Phil Traill	Rich Dahm	May 8, 2018	T12.15671	5.88
Sue and Brick are determined to end the family tradition of giving Frankie a lame gift for Mother's Day, they come up with a gift idea that is almost as good. Meanwhile, Axl tells Mike about a job opportunity at a national sporting goods chain that has more advancement potential than his current position, but the job is in Denver. To keep Frankie from finding out, Mike has to make up one lie after another to cover for Axl's absence when he travels to Denver for the interview.
213	22	"Split Decision"	Danny Salles	Tim Hobert	May 15, 2018	T12.15672	6.34
In the aftermath of Frankie finding out that Axl may take a job in Denver, she makes it her mission to sway him from moving away, including recruiting Lexie to manipulate his decision. Brick drives everyone crazy when he buys a huge amount of lawn chairs to replace the fraying one he's been using for nine years. At the end of the episode, Axl tells his parents that he is going to take the job, much to Frankie's dismay, and Sue leaves the infamous snow globe in the duffel bag that Sean has packed for his trip.
214	23	"A Heck of a Ride"	Lee Shallat-Chemel	Eileen Heisler & DeAnn Heline	May 22, 2018	T12.15673	7.09
215	24	"A Heck of a Ride"	Lee Shallat-Chemel	Eileen Heisler & DeAnn Heline	May 22, 2018	T12.15674	7.09
Frankie tries acting calmly in front of Axl, hoping he will one day visit her after he moves to Denver. Axl first thinks he has a month to prepare, but Mike tells him he actually has four days. The night before the family leaves, Brick tries to secure a new spot in the car. After an argument, the siblings agree it will be difficult to adjust to living apart from one another. The next day, as the family leaves, Mike gives Axl Big Mike's engraved watch as a parting gift. Sean is stopped by airport security because of the snow globe Sue put in his bag, so he quickly catches up with the Hecks, allowing him and Sue to confess their mutual love. Frankie finally breaks down over Axl's departure, and everyone comforts her before the Hecks drive off, leaving their snack bag on the side of the road again. In flash-forwards, Axl moves back to Orson, marries Lexie, and has three sons who are as irresponsible and moody as he was, Sue and Sean marry after several break-ups, and Brick becomes a successful author. Back in the present, the family resumes driving to Denver, realizing too late they forgot their snack bag, as a plane flies overhead.

== Ratings ==
Viewership and ratings per episode of The Middle season 9
No.	Title	Air date	Rating/share (18–49)	Viewers (millions)	DVR (18–49)	Total (18–49)
1	"Vive La Hecks"	October 3, 2017	1.6/6	6.21	—N/a	—N/a
2	"Please Don't Feed the Hecks"	October 10, 2017	1.4/6	5.93	0.7	2.1
3	"Meet the Parents"	October 17, 2017	1.3/5	5.53	—N/a	—N/a
4	"Halloween VIII: Orson Murder Mystery"	October 24, 2017	1.3/5	5.80	—N/a	—N/a
5	"Role of a Lifetime"	October 31, 2017	1.2/5	5.05	—N/a	—N/a
6	"The Setup"	November 7, 2017	1.4/5	5.63	—N/a	—N/a
7	"Thanksgiving IX"	November 14, 2017	1.3/5	5.70	—N/a	—N/a
8	"Eyes Wide Open"	November 21, 2017	1.3/5	6.05	—N/a	—N/a
9	"The 200th"	December 5, 2017	1.2/5	5.78	0.6	1.8
10	"The Christmas Miracle"	December 12, 2017	1.3/5	5.68	—N/a	—N/a
11	"New Year's Revelations"	January 2, 2018	1.5/6	6.36	—N/a	—N/a
12	"The Other Man"	January 9, 2018	1.3/5	5.42	—N/a	—N/a
13	"Mommapalooza"	January 16, 2018	1.4/5	6.13	—N/a	—N/a
14	"Guess Who's Coming to Frozen Dinner"	February 6, 2018	1.2/5	5.63	0.7	1.9
15	"Toasted"	February 27, 2018	1.2/5	5.23	TBD	TBD
16	"The Crying Game"	March 13, 2018	1.1/4	4.80	TBD	TBD
17	"Hecks vs. Glossners: The Final Battle"	March 20, 2018	1.4/5	5.83	TBD	TBD
18	"Thank You for Not Kissing"	April 3, 2018	2.2/8	8.38	TBD	TBD
19	"Bat Out of Heck"	April 10, 2018	2.0/8	7.52	TBD	TBD
20	"Great Heckspectations"	May 1, 2018	1.5/6	6.15	TBD	TBD
21	"The Royal Flush"	May 8, 2018	1.5/6	5.88	TBD	TBD
22	"Split Decision"	May 15, 2018	1.5/6	6.34	TBD	TBD
23–24	"A Heck of a Ride"	May 22, 2018	1.7/7	7.09	TBD	TBD
