= The Middle season 1 =

The Middle
- Season 1
- DVD cover
- Starring: Patricia Heaton; Neil Flynn; Charlie McDermott; Eden Sher; Atticus Shaffer; Chris Kattan
- No. of episodes: 24

Release
- Original network: ABC
- Original release: September 30, 2009 – May 19, 2010

Season chronology
- Next → Season 2

The first season of the television comedy series The Middle aired on ABC from September 30, 2009, to May 19, 2010. The season was produced by Blackie and Blondie Productions and Warner Bros. Television with series creators DeAnn Heline and Eileen Heisler serving as executive producers.

The show revolves around Frances "Frankie" Heck (Patricia Heaton), a working-class, Midwestern woman who resides with her husband Mike (Neil Flynn) in the small fictional town of Orson, Indiana. Frankie and Mike are the parents of three children, Axl (Charlie McDermott), Sue (Eden Sher), and Brick (Atticus Shaffer).

After airing only 2 episodes, ABC gave the show a full season pickup. The Middle was then renewed for a second season on January 12, 2010.

The first episode premiered to 8.707 million viewers, a 5.4/9 household rating and a 2.6/8 adults 18-49 rating. It beat out the CBS sitcom, Gary Unmarried, and the NBC drama, Mercy, both of which aired in the same timeslot.

== Cast ==
=== Main cast ===
- Patricia Heaton as Frankie Heck
- Neil Flynn as Mike Heck
- Charlie McDermott as Axl Heck
- Eden Sher as Sue Heck
- Atticus Shaffer as Brick Heck
- Chris Kattan as Bob

=== Recurring cast ===
- Brock Ciarlelli as Brad, Sue's ex-boyfriend and later friend.
- Blaine Saunders as Carly, Sue's best friend.
- Jen Ray as Nancy Donahue, the Hecks' neighbor.
- Beau Wirick as Sean Donahue, Axl's friend.
- Brian Doyle-Murray as Don Elhert, owner of the car dealership where Frankie and Bob work.

=== Guest cast ===
- Patricia Belcher as Mrs. Rettig, Brick's teacher. She appears in "Pilot".
- Vicki Lewis as Mrs. Barry, a social worker who visits the Heck household. She appears in "The Scratch".
- Mary-Pat Green as Mrs. Larimer, the principal of Orson Elementary. She appears in "The Scratch".
- John Cullum as Big Mike, Mike's father. He appears in "Thanksgiving".
- Brooke Shields as Rita Glossner, the Hecks' uncouth and troubled neighbor. She appears in "The Neighbor".
- Amy Sedaris as Abby Michaels, a motivator at Frankie's job. She appears in "The Fun House".
- Alexa Vega as Morgan, Axl's girlfriend. She appears in "The Break-Up" and "Worry Duty".
- Marsha Mason as Pat Spence, Frankie's mother. She appears in "Mother's Day".
- Betty White as Mrs. Nethercott, Brick's school librarian. She appears in "Average Rules".

== Episodes ==
No. overall	No. in season	Title	Directed by	Written by	Original release date	Prod. code	U.S. viewers (millions)
1	1	"Pilot"	Julie Anne Robinson	DeAnn Heline & Eileen Heisler	September 30, 2009	276047	8.71
Frankie is struggling in her career as a car saleswoman because she has yet to sell one. She finally thinks that she has made her first sale, but the car is stolen right in front of her. Meanwhile, Sue becomes part of the school choir ... as part of the stage crew. Brick wants Frankie to come into school dressed as a superhero for a presentation, but doesn't tell her the correct day.
2	2	"The Cheerleader"	Lee Shallat Chemel	DeAnn Heline & Eileen Heisler	October 7, 2009	3X5701	6.79
Frankie finds herself at her wits' end when her dryer breaks and she discovers that all the interest payments are due. So in a last-ditch effort to save her job and get some money, Frankie fills a car on the dealer's lot with jelly beans as a publicity stunt, but this causes the doors to stick shut. Meanwhile, Sue fails to make the swim team and realizes that she needs glasses, Brick is forced to "socially interact" when a fine prevents him from checking out books at the library, and Axl is on the receiving end of one of Mike's classic punishments.
3	3	"The Floating Anniversary"	Gail Mancuso	Rob Ulin	October 14, 2009	3X5703	6.77
The romantic anniversary getaway (consisting of a hotel room and a rug shopping expedition) that Frankie and Mike have been planning for ages becomes unhinged when Brick gets sick; Sue has a crush and doesn't know how to tell the boy; Axl gets his learner's permit; and Frankie's psychotic aunts (and their dog) require constant attention.
4	4	"The Trip"	Lee Shallat Chemel	Jana Hunter & Mitch Hunter	October 21, 2009	3X5704	6.53
After Sue raises thousands of dollars for the school by selling sausage and cheese to earn a trip to Indianapolis, she is left off the list to go on the trip. Frankie demands her little girl to fight for her right to go on the trip, but once Sue is on the bus Frankie realizes she forgot to mail the order form. Sue's anger finally gives her a voice to stand up for her rights. Meanwhile, Brick gets a girlfriend, which becomes very stressful for him. He enlists Axl's advice to break up with her (while Axl is showering), but when that fails (and ends up earning Brick a marriage and a baby), he asks his dad to step in.
5	5	"The Block Party"	Ken Whittingham	Alex Reid	October 28, 2009	3X5702	6.49
When the school counselor tells Frankie and Mike that Brick is "socially challenged", Mike sets about getting Brick some friends, but when his idea of basketball falls through, he discovers Brick has other talents, which may assist Mike in winning the Block Party lawnmower race. Meanwhile, Sue tries out for tennis ball girl, and Frankie becomes obsessed with getting Axl's old football jersey, because all of his teammates have given their mothers theirs. Axl gives Sue the jersey since he felt sorry for her failing at yet another trial and reveals his softer side to Frankie's joy.
6	6	"The Front Door"	Michael Spiller	Russ Woody	November 4, 2009	3X5705	6.04
Frankie is fed up with Axl's attitude towards her and Mike, so when he accidentally breaks down the front door, despite the fact that she has been nagging Mike to fix the door hinge for three months, she goes along with Mike to make Axl fix it. Meanwhile, Frankie must sell a car within a week or she will be forced to wear a dog suit outside the car lot as a promotion, and Sue stresses over her school pictures and decides to go for a retake. Elsewhere, Brick must complete a school assignment that involves building a model of the Indiana state capitol building.
7	7	"The Scratch"	Wendey Stanzler & Alex Reid	DeAnn Heline & Eileen Heisler	November 18, 2009	3X5707	7.06
While scrambling to gather the garbage for trash day, Frankie accidentally hits Brick with a beer bottle. When Brick brags to a school hall monitor about his mark, Frankie and Mike must answer to the police, leading to a social worker monitoring the family. Unfortunately, the social worker is a spurned lover of Mike's. Meanwhile, Mr. Ehlert wants Bob to shoot a new commercial for the car dealership.
8	8	"Thanksgiving"	Michael Spiller	Vijal Patel	November 25, 2009	3X5706	5.94
Due to Frankie having to work, Mike not inviting his dad to Thanksgiving dinner, Axl trying to leave for snowboarding, and Brick wanting to visit a corn maze, Frankie cancels Thanksgiving. Mike and the kids try to pull Thanksgiving together for her. Meanwhile, everyone but Sue thinks her new boyfriend is gay.
9	9	"Siblings"	Barnet Kellman	Rob Ulin	December 2, 2009	3X5709	6.19
Seeing the Donahue kids being nice together, Frankie becomes self-conscious of her parenting skills and tries to gather her own family for "family fun." Meanwhile, the booster club chooses her to head the wreath sale; and Mike must fire Aunt Edie as the quarry's accountant after she makes a huge mistake with the checks.
10	10	"Christmas"	Reginald Hudlin	Roy Brown	December 9, 2009	3X5708	7.69
To allow Frankie to focus on rehearsing for an honored solo in her church's midnight Christmas service, Mike takes over handling the many chores of setting up the Heck family Christmas. The family then oversleep and nearly miss Frankie's solo. Meanwhile, Brick becomes depressed over losing a toy, and Sue is confused when her boyfriend still hasn't kissed her after a month of dating.
11	11	"The Jeans"	Jamie Babbit	Jana Hunter & Mitch Hunter	January 6, 2010	3X5710	7.37
Frankie buys Sue an expensive pair of jeans and Mike buys Axl a cheap car. Brick offers to take care of a relative's dog and his parents reluctantly agree.
12	12	"The Neighbor"	Lee Shallat Chemel	Jana Hunter & Mitch Hunter	January 6, 2010	3X5712	8.07
Brooke Shields plays Rita Glossner, a hard-living cigarette-smoker who is considered "mean" or "an Amazon" by her neighbors. Her sons, the dreaded Glossner boys, are also deemed "bullies" and get in a fight with Sue. Frankie goes to confront Rita, and discovers many items in the Glossners' garage which had been stolen from the Hecks and other neighbors. Meanwhile, Axl teaches Brick how to play kickball.
13	13	"The Interview"	Ken Whittingham	Vijal Patel	January 13, 2010	3X5711	5.95
Mike finds dinosaur bones in the quarry, which closes the quarry while the bones are analyzed, putting him temporarily out of work. When he tries to find another job, he discovers that the interview process has changed in the last 20 years. Meanwhile, Frankie helps Brick when he decides to run for class historian.
14	14	"The Yelling"	Elliot Hegarty	Rob Ulin	February 3, 2010	3X5713	7.32
Bob offers Mike a spot on the night shift, meaning Mike must cooperate with Bob; Frankie tries to yell less at the kids.
15	15	"Valentine's Day"	Chris Koch	Bruce Rasmussen	February 10, 2010	3X5714	7.83
Frankie and Mike try, but largely fail, to have a romantic Valentine's Day dinner out. Brick gets invited to his first sleepover by a member of his social-skills class a.k.a. "The Odd Squad" who pretends he is a cat. Sue's friend Carly "blossoms" after getting her braces off, which gets the two invited to a wild "Boy-Girl Party." Axl has shifting Valentine's plans involving girls, and he and two of his friends wait at the Hecks' home expecting girls who never appear.
16	16	"The Bee"	Ken Whittingham	Eileen Heisler & DeAnn Heline	March 3, 2010	3X5717	5.89
Brick wins a local spelling bee and Mike is highly enthusiastic about his talent. Meanwhile, Sue's birthday is forgotten, so Frankie tries to make it up to her on the trip to Chicago.
17	17	"The Break-Up"	Wendey Stanzler	Vijal Patel	March 10, 2010	3X5715	6.30
Axl has a seemingly normal girlfriend (Alexa Vega) who ultimately breaks up with him. Meanwhile, Sue and Brick watch a zombie movie and have nightmares.
18	18	"The Fun House"	Chris Koch	Roy Brown	March 24, 2010	3X5716	7.16
Frankie's boss hires a motivator named Abby (Amy Sedaris), which cause Frankie to think her job is on the line. Meanwhile, with Frankie putting in extra hours at work, Mike has to deal with issues at home, including getting a pool table in order to make the house more fun for Axl and his friends, giving advice to Sue's slightly confused ex-boyfriend, and helping Brick with a school project.
19	19	"The Final Four"	Alex Reid	Rob Ulin	March 31, 2010	3X5719	6.23
Mike gets tickets to The Final Four, but the death of Frankie's uncle Mack may change his plans. Meanwhile, Sue tries to help Brick get out of going to a birthday party by impersonating Frankie over the phone, but panics when she realizes that Frankie is going to make a call for real in order to get him out because of the funeral.
20	20	"TV or Not TV"	Lee Shallat Chemel	Vijal Patel	April 14, 2010	3X5718	6.70
With Mike laid off at work, the family are in debt and give up cable TV to save money. Though the kids are initially unhappy with the change, they soon find distractions and it's Frankie and Mike who end up having the most difficulty without the TV. Axl starts a band with Darrin and Sean. Sue dreams of being a model and starts a babysitting service to save the money to do so. Brick and his shy friends are forced into school recess with boisterous "regular" kids, much to his dismay. Frankie wins a Bingo jackpot.
21	21	"Worry Duty"	Lee Shallat Chemel	Bruce Rasmussen	April 28, 2010	3X5720	7.10
Axl gets back together with over-achieving Morgan, the girlfriend previously seen in The Break-Up, whom Frankie now sees as annoying and controlling. Brick becomes "mother" to a baby chicken. The family attend a picnic thrown by Frankie's miserly boss.
22	22	"Mother's Day"	Barnet Kellman	Mitch Hunter & Jana Hunter	May 5, 2010	3X5721	6.75
Frankie experiences a hectic, emotionally exhausting Mother's Day, which she unfavorably compares to Father's Day. Meanwhile, Sue is tormented because she stole a small novelty item. Hoping to celebrate Mother's Day right, Frankie and Sue visit Frankie's mother (Marsha Mason), who is annoyed, as she had shared Frankie's wish for a peaceful day to herself.
23	23	"Signals"	Jamie Babbit	DeAnn Heline & Eileen Heisler	May 12, 2010	3X5722	7.49
Mike and Brick both try to be more sociable, which lands them in awkward situations. Sue is enamored with guitar-playing pastor "Reverend TimTom." Axl hopes the family's barbecue will allow him to see attractive girls in bikinis...if the weather clears up.
24	24	"Average Rules"	Wendey Stanzler	DeAnn Heline & Eileen Heisler	May 19, 2010	3X5723	7.56
Parent-Teacher conferences cause Frankie to worry about the kids. In them she's told Axl is gifted but not applying himself, that Sue's teachers still don't recall her, and that Brick may have to repeat second grade because he hasn't returned over 30 books to the school librarian (Betty White). Sue is excited to be accepted on the school cross-country team, until tragedy strikes when a deer runs into her and hurts her legs, forcing her to walk on crutches for five laps.

== Ratings ==
No.	Title	Air date	Rating/Share (18–49)	Viewers (million)	Reference
1	"Pilot"	September 30, 2009	2.6/8	8.71	
2	"The Cheerleader"	October 7, 2009	2.1/6	6.79	
3	"The Floating Anniversary"	October 14, 2009	2.1/6	6.77	
4	"The Trip"	October 21, 2009	2.0/6	6.53	
5	"The Block Party"	October 28, 2009	2.2/6	6.49	
6	"The Front Door"	November 4, 2009	1.9/5	6.04	
7	"The Scratch"	November 18, 2009	2.4/7	7.06	
8	"Thanksgiving"	November 25, 2009	1.8/6	5.94	
9	"Siblings"	December 2, 2009	2.0/6	6.19	
10	"Christmas"	December 9, 2009	2.4/7	7.69	
11	"The Jeans"	January 6, 2010	2.2/6	7.37	
12	"The Neighbor"	January 6, 2010	2.7/7	8.07	
13	"The Interview"	January 13, 2010	2.1/5	5.95	
14	"The Yelling"	February 3, 2010	2.7/8	7.32	
15	"Valentine's Day"	February 10, 2010	2.9/8	7.83	
16	"The Bee"	March 3, 2010	2.1/6	5.89	
17	"The Break-Up"	March 10, 2010	2.3/7	6.30	
18	"The Fun House"	March 24, 2010	2.5/7	7.16	
19	"The Final Four"	March 31, 2010	2.0/6	6.23	
20	"TV or Not TV"	April 14, 2010	2.3/7	6.70	
21	"Worry Duty"	April 28, 2010	2.4/7	7.10	
22	"Mother's Day"	May 5, 2010	2.3/7	6.75	
23	"Signals"	May 12, 2010	2.4/7	7.49	
24	"Average Rules"	May 19, 2010	2.5/8	7.56	
