= Mastandrea =

Mastandrea is an Italian surname. Notable people with the surname include:

- Alicia Mastandrea, Argentine politician
- Katlin Mastandrea (born 1995), American actress
- Valerio Mastandrea (born 1972), Italian actor
