= Vivien & the Florist =

American biographical drama film

- Directed by: Nick Sandow
- Written by: Jayce Bartok
- Produced by: Jayce Bartok; Lauren Hale-Rieckhoff; Kelli Reilly; Tiffany Bartok; Shawn Arani
- Starring: Carla Gugino; Matthew Modine; David Hyde Pierce; Jack Davenport; Maria-Christina Oliveras; Eoin Macken; Charlie McDermott
- Cinematography: Jo Jo Lam
- Edited by: Justin Rosen
- Music by: Chris Hanebutt
- Production companies: Andiamo Pictures; Vinyl Foote Productions
- Country: United States
- Language: English

Vivien & the Florist is an upcoming American biographical drama film directed by Nick Sandow and written by Jayce Bartok. It depicts the life of Vivien Leigh during the winter of 1966, when she was preparing for her Broadway theatre return for Anton Chekhov's Ivanov. Carla Gugino stars as Leigh, alongside Matthew Modine, David Hyde Pierce, Jack Davenport, Maria-Christina Oliveras, Eoin Macken, and Charlie McDermott.

== Premise ==
The film will explore Leigh's struggle with bipolar disorder in the 1960s as she prepares to star in the Broadway production of John Gielgud's adaptation of Ivanov by Anton Chekhov. Famed star meets WWII veteran and blue-collar florist Joseph Penn.

== Cast ==
- Carla Gugino as Vivien Leigh
- Matthew Modine as Joseph Penn
- David Hyde Pierce as John Gielgud
- Jack Davenport as Laurence Olivier
- Maria-Christina Oliveras as Peg
- Eoin Macken as John Merivale
- Charlie McDermott as Freddie
- Annie Grant as Francesca

== Production ==
In April 2024, it was reported that a biographical drama film that depicted the life of actress Vivien Leigh during the winter of 1966 was in development, with Nick Sandow directing, Jayce Bartok writing the script, and Carla Gugino cast in the lead role. Principal photography wrapped in February 2026, in Philadelphia, with Matthew Modine, David Hyde Pierce, Jack Davenport, Maria-Christina Oliveras, Eoin Macken, Charlie McDermott, and Annie Grant rounding out the cast.

Bartok wrote the script based on a box of love letters, while Sandow explained that "What drew me to the project was the script and how it brings together, for a fleeting moment, two human beings who seemingly couldn’t be more different".
