= Charlie McDermott =

American actor and musician (born 1990)

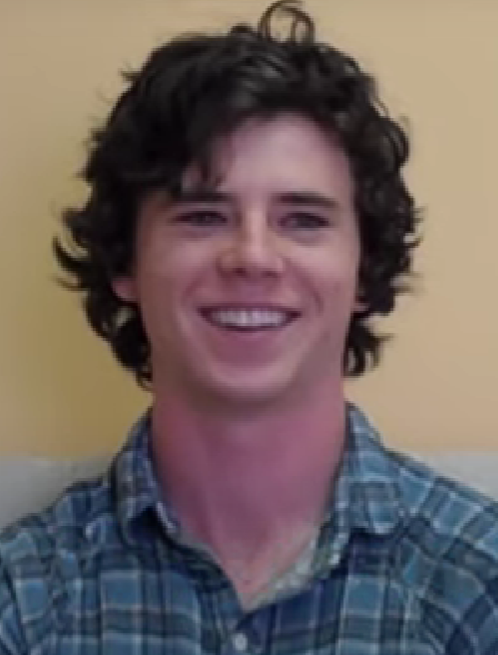
- McDermott in 2011
- Born: Charles Joseph McDermott Jr. April 6, 1990 (age 36); West Chester, Pennsylvania, U.S.
- Occupations: Actor, filmmaker, musician
- Years active: 2004–present
- Spouse: Sara Rejaie (m. 2017)

Charles Joseph McDermott Jr. (born April 6, 1990) is an American actor, filmmaker and musician. He is best known for portraying Axl Heck, the eldest child of the Heck family, in the ABC sitcom The Middle (2009–2018). He received an Independent Spirit Award nomination for his performance in the independent drama Frozen River (2008).

McDermott's other film appearances include The Village (2004), Sex Drive (2008), Hot Tub Time Machine (2010), Instant Family (2018) and Countdown (2019). He wrote, directed and starred in the independent comedy ImagiGary (2015), and played Ty in the Netflix crime drama miniseries Unbelievable (2019).

In 2020, McDermott began releasing independent folk music, starting with the album Some Things Just Fall Out of Your Hands. His second album, Blind Warm Weight, followed in 2022. He has described songwriting as an important creative outlet following his long-running role on The Middle.

== Early life and education ==
McDermott was born on April 6, 1990, in West Chester, Pennsylvania. He grew up in the Philadelphia metropolitan area and developed an interest in acting during childhood.

He attended Salesianum School in Wilmington, Delaware, before transferring to Pennsylvania Leadership Charter School, an online charter school. McDermott subsequently moved to Los Angeles at the age of 16 to pursue acting professionally.

In a 2024 interview, McDermott reflected on having spent much of his adolescence and early adulthood working in the entertainment industry. He described the challenges of developing a personal identity while becoming closely associated with a long-running television character.

== Career ==
=== 2004–2008: Early acting and Frozen River ===
McDermott began his professional acting career as a teenager. His first film appearance was in M. Night Shyamalan's psychological thriller The Village (2004), in which he played a young boy. He subsequently appeared in the independent films Disappearances (2007) and The Ten (2007). In 2008, McDermott played Troy "T.J." Eddy Jr. in Frozen River, a crime drama written and directed by Courtney Hunt and starring Melissa Leo and Misty Upham.

McDermott's performance earned him a nomination for Best Supporting Male at the 24th Independent Spirit Awards. McDermott also appeared in the teen road comedy Sex Drive (2008), playing Andy.

=== 2009–2018: The Middle ===
In 2009, McDermott was cast as Axl Heck in the ABC sitcom The Middle, created by Eileen Heisler and DeAnn Heline. The series follows Frankie and Mike Heck, played by Patricia Heaton and Neil Flynn, as they raise their three children in the fictional Indiana town of Orson. McDermott portrayed Axl, the eldest child, alongside Eden Sher as Sue and Atticus Shaffer as Brick. McDermott remained a principal cast member throughout the programme's nine seasons, from September 2009 until its conclusion in May 2018.

In a 2017 interview with The Philadelphia Inquirer, McDermott discussed his experience growing up while working on the series and the prospect of leaving a character he had portrayed for nearly a decade. During the show's run, McDermott received a nomination for a Young Artist Award as part of its ensemble cast, alongside Sher and Shaffer. He was also nominated for a Nickelodeon Kids' Choice Award for Favorite TV Actor in 2015. McDermott also directed an episode of The Middle. While working on the sitcom, he continued to appear in films, including Hot Tub Time Machine (2010) and the independent drama Morning (2010).

=== 2015–2019: Filmmaking and later acting roles ===
In 2015, McDermott wrote, directed and starred in the independent comedy ImagiGary, playing Henry. The project marked his feature-film directorial debut. The film follows a young man whose imaginary childhood friend reappears during adulthood, disrupting his attempts to establish a conventional life. McDermott subsequently appeared in the family comedy-drama Instant Family (2018), directed by Sean Anders and starring Mark Wahlberg and Rose Byrne.

In 2019, he played Scott in the supernatural horror film Countdown. That year, McDermott also appeared as Ty in the Netflix miniseries Unbelievable, starring Kaitlyn Dever, Toni Collette and Merritt Wever. The series is based on the Pulitzer Prize-winning investigation "An Unbelievable Story of Rape" and follows the investigation of a series of sexual assaults.

=== 2020–present: Music career ===
Following the conclusion of The Middle, McDermott increasingly focused on songwriting and recording music. In 2020, he released his debut album, Some Things Just Fall Out of Your Hands, an independent collection of experimental folk songs. He followed it with a second album, Blind Warm Weight, in 2022.

In a November 2024 interview with Scottish arts publication SNACK, McDermott discussed his transition from acting to music. He explained that songwriting provided a creative outlet distinct from the demands of television production and helped him develop a stronger sense of his own artistic identity after spending much of his life portraying Axl Heck. In 2024, he performed live shows the United Kingdom.

== Personal life ==
McDermott married Sara Rejaie in 2017. He has divided his time between Los Angeles and the United Kingdom. McDermott described the United Kingdom as a second home and discussed how his experiences living and travelling there had influenced his music and creative interests.

== Filmography ==
=== Film ===
Year	Title	Role	Notes
2004	The Village	10-year-old boy	
2005	Keeping Up with the Kids	Sneaky	Short film
2007	Disappearances	William "Wild Bill" Bonhomme Jr.	
2007	All Along	Tom Harrison	
2007	The Ten	Jake Johnson	
2008	Holy Sapien	Phineas	Short film
2008	Frozen River	Troy "T.J." Eddy Jr.	
2008	Sex Drive	Andy	
2008	Oh My Captain!	Ethan	Short film
2009	Safe Harbor	David	Television film
2010	Hot Tub Time Machine	Chaz	
2010	Morning	Jesse	
2010	Good Grief	Jack Hinkler	Short film
2015	Slow Learners	Student in guidance office	
2015	ImagiGary	Henry	Also writer and director
2016	Three Days	Young Sean	Short film
2018	Instant Family	Stewart	
2019	Countdown	Scott	
TBA	Vivien & the Florist	Freddie	Production status unconfirmed

=== Television ===
Year	Title	Role	Notes
2004	Windy Acres	Young Garald	7 episodes
2005	Franklin Charter	Wes	Television film
2008	The Office	Student	Episode: "Job Fair"
2008	Generation Gap	Corey Williams	Television film
2009	Captain Cook's Extraordinary Atlas	Pale Boy	Television film
2009	Medium	Brandon Whitman	Episode: "A Necessary Evil"
2009	Little Hollywood	Richie Seaman	Television pilot
2009	Private Practice	Bobby Douglas	Episode: "What You Do for Love"
2009–2018	The Middle	Axl Heck	Main cast; 215 episodes; also directed one episode
2010	Bond of Silence	Ryan Aldridge	Television film
2015	Super Clyde	Clyde	Unsold television pilot
2017	Future Man	Young Barry Futturman	Episode: "Operation: Natal Attraction"
2019	Unbelievable	Ty	Recurring role

== Discography ==
=== Studio albums ===
Year	Title	Notes
2020	Some Things Just Fall Out of Your Hands	Debut studio album
2022	Blind Warm Weight	Second studio album

== Awards and nominations ==
Year	Award	Category	Work	Result
2008	Independent Spirit Awards	Best Supporting Male	Frozen River	Nominated
2011	Young Artist Awards	Outstanding Young Ensemble in a Television Series	The Middle	Nominated
2015	Nickelodeon Kids' Choice Awards	Favorite TV Actor	The Middle	Nominated
2016	Idyllwild International Festival of Cinema	Best Actor in a Short Film	Three Days	Nominated
