= Katlin Mastandrea =

American actress

Katlin Mastandrea (born October 31, 1995) is an American actress best known for her recurring role as "Weird Ashley" Wyman on the ABC sitcom The Middle.

== Early life ==
Katlin Mastandrea was born in Englewood, Colorado on October 31, 1995. At the age of two, she told her mother that she wanted to "make people laugh." After first working in Los Angeles at the age of 12, Katlin and her family moved to California permanently when she was 16 years old so that she could pursue her career.

== Career ==
As an actress, Mastandrea has played a number of television roles. After minor roles, Katlin gained critical acclaim in the role of Izzy in the short film Make Believer. For her performance, she won a Best Young Actress Performance in a Short Film award at the 32nd Young Artist Awards. That same year, Mastandrea had a role on the CBS drama Criminal Minds. Within a year, she was cast in the role of "Weird Ashley" for the ABC sitcom The Middle. as well as the recurring role of "Olivia" in the FX comedy Anger Management.

Recently, Mastandrea began work as a director, cinematographer and editor for a documentary entitled "From the Heartland." This documentary follows a year in the life of a coach and farmer in a small, rural community.

== Filmography ==
Year	Title	Role	Notes
2008	Gator Armstrong Plays with Dolls	Katie Entro	Main role
2010	Criminal Minds	Mae	Guest appearance, episode "Mosley Lane"
2010	Make Believer	Izzy	Main role Won- Young Artist Award - Best Young Actress (2011)
2011–2018	The Middle	"Weird Ashley" Wyman	Recurring role
2012	Anger Management (TV series)	Olivia	Recurring role
2014	Wish Wizard (Short)	Student	Guest appearance
2017	From the Heartland (Documentary)	Director	Also cinematographer, editor
