= Eden Sher =

American actress (born 1991)

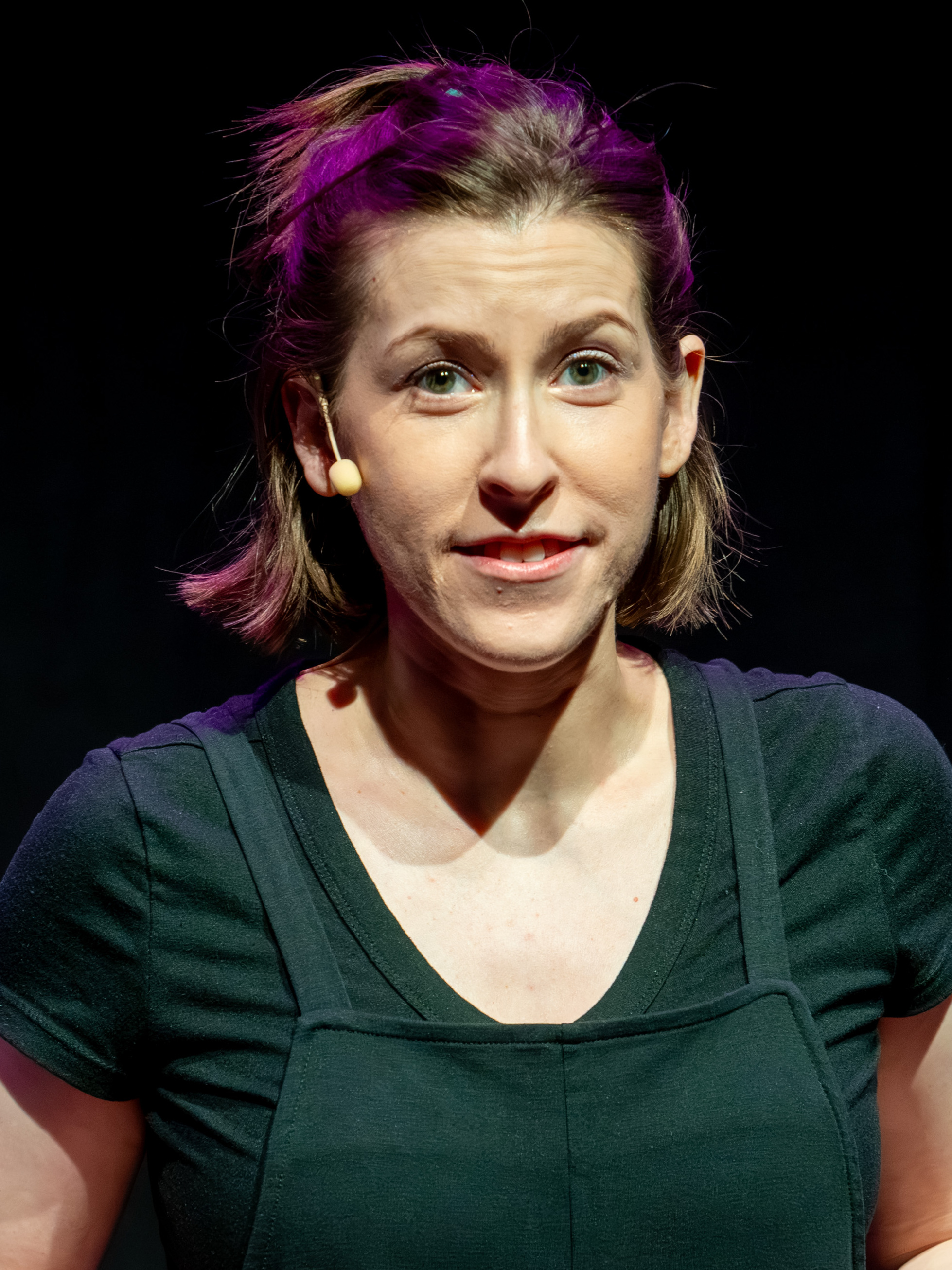
- Sher at the 2025 Edinburgh Festival Fringe
- Born: Eden Rebecca Sher; December 26, 1991 (age 34); Los Angeles, California, U.S.
- Occupations: Actress; comedian; author
- Years active: 2000–present
- Known for: Sue Heck in The Middle, Star Butterfly in Star vs. the Forces of Evil
- Spouse: Nick Cron-Devico (m. 2020)
- Children: 3

Eden Rebecca Sher (born December 26, 1991) is an American actress, comedian and author. The accolades she has received include a Critics' Choice Television Award, alongside a Screen Actors Guild Award nomination.

In television, Sher is best known for her main roles as Sue Heck on the ABC sitcom The Middle (2009–2018), and the voice of Star Butterfly on the Disney animated series Star vs. the Forces of Evil (2015–2019). She also had recurring roles as Gretchen on the Showtime series Weeds (2006), Carrie Fenton on the ABC sitcom Sons & Daughters (2006–2007), and PJ Fields on the CW series Jane the Virgin (2019).

In film, Sher had lead roles in The Outcasts (2017) and Step Sisters (2018).

== Early life ==
Eden Rebecca Sher was born on December 26, 1991 in Los Angeles, California. She is Jewish, with descent from diaspora communities in Austria and Russia. She was raised by her single mother, a school teacher. She began her acting career at age eight by participating in school plays, local theater productions and singing in her elementary school choir. Her interest in acting was ignited after her appearance in a Jaywalking segment on The Tonight Show with Jay Leno gained network attention.

== Career ==
In 2006, Sher played the role of Gretchen in the Showtime comedy-drama series Weeds. Later that same year, she landed the regular role as Carrie Fenton on Sons & Daughters, which was canceled 11 episodes into its first season. In 2007, Sher played a student attending Harbor High in the final season of the Fox drama series The O.C. She also appeared in the 2001 short film Stuck and television commercials for Capital One and Fruity Pebbles.

From 2009 to 2018, Sher starred in the ABC comedy series The Middle as Sue Heck, a quirky but optimistic teenager. In 2013, she won the Critics' Choice Television Award for Best Supporting Actress in a Comedy Series for her role in The Middle.

On May 30, 2018, it was reported that a spin-off focused on Eden Sher's character Sue Heck was in the works at ABC and nearing a pilot order with the goal to launch in midseason. On July 20, 2018, in an interview with TVLine's Michael Ausiello, Sher revealed that the network had ordered a pilot for the potential series, to possibly launch in early 2019. The spin-off was officially given the green light for a pilot on August 13, 2018 for a premiere the following year. On October 5, 2018, the series was given the working title Sue Sue In The City, but this decision was later reversed. On November 21, 2018, it was announced that ABC had passed on moving forward with the proposed series.

Since 2023, Sher has been touring her one-woman show I Was in a Sitcom, describing her role on The Middle and the impact it has had on her life since.

== Personal life ==
Sher announced in March 2019 that she was engaged to screenwriter Nick Cron-Devico. They married on July 12, 2020.

Sher and Cron-Devico had twin daughters in late 2021, and Sher announced her pregnancy with their third child in October 2025, giving birth to a son in early 2026.

Sher has bipolar disorder and has publicly discussed her diagnosis, including how it impacted her first pregnancy.

== Writing ==
Sher's book The Emotionary: A Dictionary of Words That Don't Exist for Feelings That Do was published by Razorbill (Penguin Random House) in 2017. All her life, Sher has suffered from what she calls "dyscommunicatia" (n. the inability to articulate a feeling through words) and one day decided that whenever she had an emotion for which she had no word, she would make one up. The result of this is The Emotionary, a humorous non-fiction dictionary and lexicon illustrated by Julia Wertz that is intended to help people name and deal with their complicated feelings and move on.

== Filmography ==
=== Film ===
Year	Title	Role	Notes
2001	Stuck	Caterpillar Girl	
2014	Veronica Mars	Penny	
2016	Temps	Amy	
2017	The Outcasts	Mindy Lipschitz	
2018	Step Sisters	Beth	
2025	A Keller Christmas Vacation	Emory	Television Film

=== Television ===
Year	Title	Role	Notes
2006	Weeds	Gretchen	Recurring role; 8 episodes
2006–2007	Sons & Daughters	Carrie Fenton	Recurring role; 11 episodes
2007	The O.C.	Jane	Episode: "The Dream Lover"
2008	The Middleman	Cindy Marshall	Episode: "The Boyband Superfan Interrogation"
2009	Sonny with a Chance	Lucy	Episode: "Three's Not Company"
2009	Party Down	Monica McSpadden	Episode: "Willow Canyon Homeowners Annual Party"
2009–2018	The Middle	Sue Heck	Main role; 215 episodes
2012	Pair of Kings	Billie	Episode: "The Oogli Stick"
2015–2019	Star vs. the Forces of Evil	Star Butterfly (voice)	Main role; 76 episodes
2016	Sing It!	Jessica	2 episodes
2018	Robot Chicken	Sarah / Goth Daughter / Widowed Mouse (voice)	Voice, episode: "Things Look Bad for the Streepster"
2018	Superstore	Penny	Episode: "Maternity Leave"
2018	Sue Sue in the City	Sue Heck	Unaired pilot
2019	Jane the Virgin	PJ Fields	Recurring role (season 5)
2023	Lopez vs Lopez	June	Episode: "Lopez vs. Neighbors"
2023	How I Met Your Father	Deirdre	Episode: "Pathetic Deirdre"
2024–2026	Chibiverse	Star Butterfly, Scientist #7 (voice)	5 episodes
2025	Night Court	Madison	Episode: "Pension Tension"
2026	Eden Sher: I Was on a Sitcom	Self	Stand Up Special

=== Web ===
Year	Title	Role	Notes
2010	Stalker Chronicles	Jenny	Episode: "Gutter Dolls"
2013	Lizzie & Ali, a (Mostly) True Story	Emily Dworkin	Episode: "5"
2014	Scotch Moses	Claire	Episode: "Group Therapy"
2026	Theme Song Takeover	Star Butterfly (voice)	Episode: "Ludo Takes Over the Star vs. the Forces of Evil Theme Song!"

== Writing credits ==
Year	Title	Notes
2017	The Emotionary: A Dictionary of Words That Don't Exist for Feelings That Do	Illustrated by Julia Wertz

== Awards and nominations ==
Year	Award	Category	Nominated work	Result
2007	Screen Actors Guild Awards	Outstanding Performance by an Ensemble in a Comedy Series (shared with the cast)	Weeds	Nominated
2010	Young Artist Awards	Best Performance in a TV Series	The Middle	Nominated
2011	Young Artist Awards	Outstanding Young Ensemble in a TV Series (shared with Charlie McDermott and Atticus Shaffer)	The Middle	Nominated
2011	Critics' Choice Television Awards	Best Supporting Actress in a Comedy Series	The Middle	Nominated
2012	Critics' Choice Television Awards	Best Supporting Actress in a Comedy Series	The Middle	Nominated
2013	Critics' Choice Television Awards	Best Supporting Actress in a Comedy Series	The Middle	Won
2013	Teen Choice Awards	Choice TV Female Scene Stealer	The Middle	Nominated
2014	Teen Choice Awards	Choice TV Female Scene Stealer	The Middle	Nominated
2015	Gold Derby Awards	Comedy Supporting Actress	The Middle	Nominated
2015	Critics' Choice Television Awards	Best Supporting Actress in a Comedy Series	The Middle	Nominated
2016	Critics' Choice Television Awards	Best Supporting Actress in a Comedy Series	The Middle	Nominated
