= Neil Flynn =

American actor and comedian (born 1960)

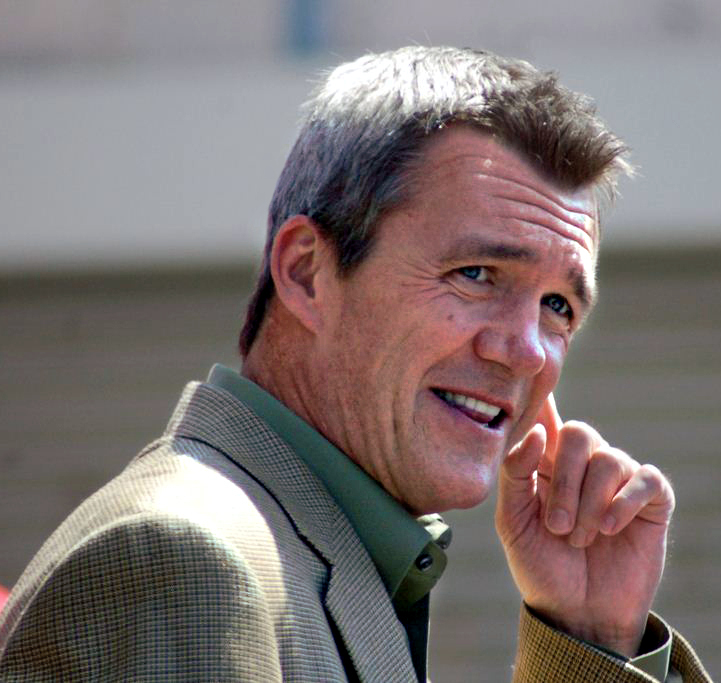
- Flynn at the Hollywood Walk of Fame in June 2012.
- Born: Neil Richard Flynn; November 13, 1960 (age 65); Chicago, Illinois, U.S.
- Occupations: Actor; comedian
- Years active: 1987–present
- Known for: Janitor (Scrubs); Mike Heck (The Middle)

Neil Richard Flynn (born November 13, 1960) is an American actor and comedian. After performing with numerous comedy troupes in the Chicago area during the 1980s, he made his film debut in Major League (1989). During the 1990s, Flynn had supporting roles in the films Rookie of the Year (1993), The Fugitive (1993), and Magnolia (1999).

After a starring voice role as XR on the ABC and UPN animated series Buzz Lightyear of Star Command (2000–2001), Flynn had his breakout with a recurring, later main, role as the Janitor on the first eight seasons of the NBC and ABC medical sitcom Scrubs (2001–2009). Following his breakout, he had a starring role in the comedy film Hoot (2006) and supporting roles in the films Mean Girls (2004) and Indiana Jones and the Kingdom of the Crystal Skull (2008).

Flynn received further mainstream recognition for his main role as Mike Heck on the ABC sitcom The Middle (2009–2018), which earned him a nomination for the Critics' Choice Television Award for Best Supporting Actor in a Comedy Series in 2016. In the late 2010s and 2020s, Flynn starred in the Christian comedy film The Resurrection of Gavin Stone (2017) and had a main role as Fred Herbert on the NBC sitcom Abby's (2019).

== Early life and education ==
Flynn was born on the south side of Chicago, Illinois. He is of Irish descent and was raised in a devout Catholic household. He moved to Waukegan, Illinois, at an early age.

As a student at Waukegan East High School in 1978, he and Mike Shklair won an Illinois Individual Events championship for Humorous Duet Acting. He attended Bradley University in Peoria, Illinois, where he was a member of Sigma Nu fraternity, acted in plays, and participated on the Bradley University Speech Team.

After graduating in 1982, Flynn returned to Chicago to pursue an acting career.

== Career ==
In Chicago, Flynn acted with the Goodman and Steppenwolf theaters. He was nominated for a Joseph Jefferson Award (Actor in a Principal Role, for The Ballad of the Sad Cafe, 1986). He also performed at the Improv Olympic and the Second City Comedy Troupe.

In 1998, he founded the improv team Beer Shark Mice with David Koechner, which was still active as of 2015.

Although his role on Scrubs had been to that point the most visible, he had other small roles in a variety of different TV shows and movies, including That '70s Show, Baby's Day Out, CSI, My Boys, Seinfeld, and Smallville.

In The Fugitive, he plays a Chicago police officer who is killed by the one-armed man, Frederick Sykes while he is fighting Dr. Richard Kimble. This role was used in a subplot of the Scrubs episode "My Friend the Doctor" when J.D. notices Flynn's character in the film and believes that Flynn's Janitor character is the actor in the film. In 2008, Flynn worked with Harrison Ford again, playing a suspicious law enforcement official as FBI agent Smith in Indiana Jones and the Kingdom of the Crystal Skull.

Flynn had a minor role in Mean Girls as the father of Lindsay Lohan's character. He then played the part of an anonymous police officer in Anchorman: The Legend of Ron Burgundy; this scene was cut out of the final version of the film, though it can be viewed in the straight-to-DVD spin-off film Wake Up, Ron Burgundy: The Lost Movie, and in the deleted scenes of the Anchorman DVD. He had a minor role in Major League as a longshoreman and fan of the Cleveland Indians. Flynn had a role on Phil Hendrie's animated pilot that was not picked up by FOX.

He was also first baseman Stan Okie in the movie Rookie of the Year.

Flynn appeared in an episode of The Drew Carey Show, playing the fake husband of future Scrubs co-star Christa Miller. He appeared in an episode of Seinfeld, playing a police officer.

=== Scrubs ===
For Scrubs, Flynn auditioned for the role of Dr. Cox but was given the role of Janitor, instead. He was originally only cast for the first episode ("My First Day"), but he became a regular, playing a character known only as the Janitor, who devotes much of his energy to menacing young Dr. John "J.D." Dorian. His name is not revealed in the series until the season 8 finale when, upon J.D.'s first time asking about it, he simply says his name is Glenn Matthews. This is also speculated to be false for two reasons: first after J.D. leaves the shot, an orderly addresses the Janitor as "Tommy"; and second, while watching The Fugitive with Carla and Danni (Dr. Cox's sister-in-law, played by Tara Reid) in the season 3 episode 'My Friend The Doctor', J.D. notices the real-life Flynn's character in the train scene. When the Janitor confirms he was in the movie at the end of the episode, some fans speculated the Janitor's name in Scrubs is Neil Flynn, but this was dismissed by Flynn in an interview. Flynn was a series regular with Scrubs through the first eight seasons. When Scrubs was canceled by NBC and subsequently picked up by ABC, he signed a second position one-year deal for Scrubs season 9, which would have allowed him to continue on Scrubs if his pilot The Middle was not picked up. The Middle pilot was picked up, but he appeared as a guest star in Scrubs' season 9 premiere.

=== The Middle ===
Flynn played the supporting role of lower-class dad Mike Heck on ABC's The Middle (2009–2018). The character had three children and worked at the Orson Limestone Quarry in rural central Indiana.

For his work on The Middle, Flynn was nominated for Best Supporting Actor in a Comedy Series at the 6th Critics' Choice Television Awards.

=== Voice-over work ===
Flynn has also done voice acting for the animated series Buzz Lightyear of Star Command, though he is better known for voicing the popular characters Skidd McMarx and the Plumber in the first three Ratchet & Clank games for the PlayStation 2. He also made 2 guest appearances in Kim Possible.

Flynn voiced the character Max Flush on the FOX TV show Bob's Burgers in the episode "O.T.: The Outside Toilet".

As of 2015, he was providing the voice of Chuck, the foster father of the title character in the DC Comics animated web series Vixen.

== Honors and awards ==
- 2017: American Forensic Association National Events Tournament Distinguished Alumni Award

== Filmography ==
=== Film ===
Year	Title	Role	Notes
1989	Major League	Longshoreman	
1993	Rookie of the Year	Stan Okie	
1993	The Fugitive	Transit Cop	
1994	Baby's Day Out	Cop in the park	
1994	The Fence	Dominick	
1996	Chain Reaction	State Trooper Neimitz	
1997	Home Alone 3	Police Officer #1	
1999	Magnolia	Stanley Berry	
2000	The Right Temptation	Max	
2001	The Removers	Alien Mask Man	
2002	It's a Very Merry Muppet Christmas Movie	Himself	
2003	Brainwarp	Detective Jim Fist	Direct-to-video
2004	Mean Girls	Chip Heron	
2004	Anchorman: The Legend of Ron Burgundy	Cop	Deleted scenes
2006	Hoot	Mr. Eberhart	
2007	Sex and Death 101	Zack	
2007	Alive and Well	Joel	
2008	Indiana Jones and the Kingdom of the Crystal Skull	FBI Agent Paul Smith	
2009	Cloudy with a Chance of Meatballs	Weather News Network Producer	Voice
2017	The Resurrection of Gavin Stone	Waylon Stone	
2020	Superman: Man of Tomorrow	Jonathan Kent	Voice
2022	5-25-77	Dr. Callahan	
2023	Unexpected	Rupert	

=== Television ===
Year	Title	Role	Notes
1987	CBS Summer Playhouse	LAPD Officer	Episode: "Kung Fu: The Next Generation"
1987	Sable	Real Security Guard	Episode: "Copycat"
1989	Tour of Duty	SEAL	Episode: "Sealed with a Kiss"
1989	Doogie Howser, M.D.	Policeman #1	Episode: "Pilot"
1996	To Sir, with Love II	Detective Dennis	Television film
1996–1997	Early Edition	Cop, Kellaher, Marilyn	3 episodes
1997	Seinfeld	Cop #1	Episode: "The Summer of George"
1998	The Drew Carey Show	Scott Honey	Episode: "Kate's Family"
1998	Ellen	George	Episode: "It's a Gay, Gay, Gay, Gay World!"
1999	That '70s Show	The Bouncer	Episode: "The Velvet Rope"
1999	Sliders	Officer Phil	Episode: "Easy Slider"
1999	Chicago Hope	John Derricks	Episode: "Vigilance and Care"
2000	Then Came You	Cop	Episode: "Then Came the Monthiversary"
2000	Family Law	Jack Lumberg	Episode: "Telling Lies"
2000–2001	Buzz Lightyear of Star Command	XR	Voice, 24 episodes
2001	The District	George Ryerson	Episode: "Vigilante"
2001	Norm	Lee	Episode: "Norm vs. Deception"
2001–2009, 2026	Scrubs	Janitor	Main cast (seasons 2–8), recurring (season 1), guest (season 9–10)
2002	CSI: Crime Scene Investigation	Officer Yarnell	Episode: "Identity Crisis"
2002	Boston Public	Walter Andrews	Episode: "Chapter Thirty-Four"
2002	NYPD Blue	Kevin Healey	Episode: "Low Blow"
2002	It's a Very Merry Muppet Christmas Movie	Janitor	Television film
2002–2003	Clone High	Janitor; various voices	12 episodes
2003–2004	Smallville	Pete Dinsmore	2 episodes
2003-2007	Kim Possible	Beta, Tweed	2 episodes
2005	King of the Hill	Turpin	Voice, episode: "Arlen City Bomber"
2005	Love, Inc.	Nathan	Episode: "Love, Inc."
2006	Joey	Father O'Neill	2 episodes
2006	My Boys	Danny Finn	Episode: "When Heroes Fall from Grace"
2006	Re-Animated	Head of Appleday Board	Television film
2007	The Naked Trucker and T-Bones Show	Hitchhiker	Episode: "T-Bones TV"
2009	Monkey Talk	Kevin	Television film
2009–2018	The Middle	Michael "Mike" Heck	Main cast
2012–2015	Randy Cunningham: 9th Grade Ninja	Mr. Bannister	Voice, 4 episodes
2013	Bob's Burgers	Max Flush	Voice, episode: "O.T.: The Outside Toilet"
2014	Surviving Jack	Sport Teacher	Episode: "She Drives Me Crazy"
2014	Key & Peele	Doctor	Episode: "Sex Addict Wendell"
2015	Undateable	Customer	Episode: "A Live Episode Walks Into a Bar"
2015	Jeopardy!	Himself	3 episodes
2019	Abby's	Fred	Main cast
2021	Chicago Party Aunt	Old Man in Bar	Voice, episode: "Ribs for Her Pleasure"
2022	Girls5eva	Chris Dutkowsky	Episode: "Can't Wait 2 Wait"
2023	Lopez vs Lopez	Steve	Episode: "Lopez vs Neighbors"
2023	Clone High	Janitor	Episode: "Clone Alone"
2023	The Santa Clauses	Donner	Voice, episode: "The Kribble Krabble Clause"
2023–present	Shrinking	Raymond	5 episodes

=== Web ===
Year	Title	Role	Notes
2015–2016	Vixen	Chuck McCabe	Voice, 6 episodes
2022	PBC	General Wayne McGinty	Episode: "Queen of Ethics"

=== Video games ===
Year	Title	Role
2002	Ratchet & Clank	Plumber, Skid McMarx, Robot Lieutenant, Inventor, Foreman
2003	Ratchet & Clank: Going Commando	Plumber
2004	Ratchet & Clank: Up Your Arsenal	Plumber, Skid McMarx, Taxi Driver, Gary
2011	Batman: Arkham City	Inmate

== Awards and nominations ==
Year	Award	Category	Nominated work	Result
1999	National Board of Review Awards	Best Acting by an Ensemble (shared with the cast)	Magnolia	Won
2016	Critics' Choice Television Awards	Best Supporting Actor in a Comedy Series	The Middle	Nominated
