= Atticus Shaffer =

American actor (born 1998)

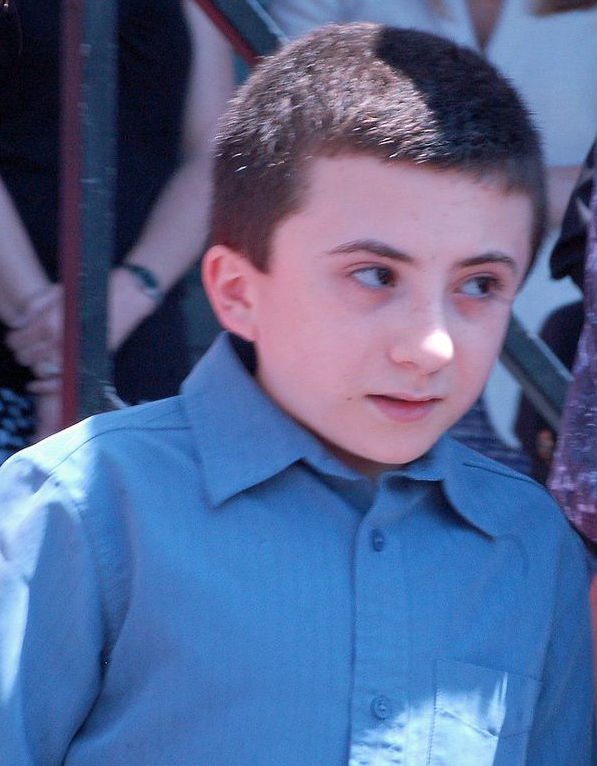
- Shaffer attending the Hollywood Walk of Fame in 2012
- Born: June 19, 1998 (age 28); Santa Clarita, California, U.S.
- Occupations: Actor; YouTuber
- Years active: 2007–present
- Known for: Role as Brick Heck in The Middle

Twitch information
- Channel: atticusshaffervlog
- Years active: 2019–present
- Genre: Vlogging
- Followers: 9.9K

YouTube information
- Channel: @AtticusShafferVlog
- Years active: 2013–present
- Genre: Vlogging
- Subscribers: 75.6K
- Views: 3,428,880
- Last updated: August 11, 2026

Atticus Shaffer (born June 19, 1998) is an American actor and YouTuber. He is known for playing Brick Heck on the ABC sitcom The Middle (2009–2018), as well for voicing Edgar in the movie Frankenweenie (2012) and Ono on the Disney Junior series The Lion Guard (2016–2019), and for his brief appearance in Hancock (2008). Shaffer also voices Morrie Rydell on Focus on the Family's Adventures in Odyssey.

== Early life ==
Shaffer was born on June 19, 1998, in Santa Clarita, California to Ron and Debbie (née Solgot) Shaffer and was named after the fictional character Atticus Finch from the book To Kill a Mockingbird.

== Career ==
=== The Middle ===
Shaffer is most known for his role as Brick Heck in The Middle, which he played throughout the series' entire nine-season run, from 2009 to 2018.

In a Wired magazine interview published in January 2013, Shaffer said his role as Brick was similar to his own life, as he is also a "big reader" and "nerd[s] out over the weirdest stuff". In May 2011, a TV Guide article had reported the closeness as well. Brick's characterization, including his idiosyncratic palilalian repetition of words and phrases at the end of sentences, is based on Justin Heisler, the son of The Middle co-creator Eileen Heisler.

=== YouTube and Twitch ===
Shaffer has official YouTube and Twitch video gaming pages, titled "AtticusShafferVlog", the latter of which he announced in December 2019.

== Personal life ==
Shaffer lives in Acton, California, and has type four osteogenesis imperfecta, a condition involving a defect in collagen that causes fragile bones and short stature. He is 4 ft 8 in (142 cm) tall.

Shaffer is a Christian.

== Filmography ==
=== Television ===
Year	Title	Role	Notes
2007	The Class	Jonah	Episode: "The Class Rides a Bull"
2007	Days of Our Lives	Irish boy	Episode 1.10632
2007	Human Giant	Wade	Episode: "Mind Explosion"
2008	Carpoolers	Boy	Episode: "Take Your Daughter to Work Day"
2008	Out of Jimmy's Head	Aaron	Episode: "Bad Fad"
2009	My Name Is Earl	Space camper	Episode: "Chaz Dalton's Space Academy"
2009–2018	The Middle	Brick Heck	Main role; 215 episodes
2010	Extreme Makeover: Home Edition	Himself	Special guest, 1 episode
2010–2014	Fish Hooks	Albert Glass, Kid Fish	Voice, 28 episodes
2011	I'm in the Band	Eddie Nova Jr.	Episode: "Camp Weasel Rock"
2011	The Penguins of Madagascar	Vesuvius Twins	Voice, 3 episodes
2011	Shake It Up	Zane	Episode: "Beam It Up"
2011	ThunderCats	Young Emrick	Voice, episode: "Song of the Petalars"
2013–2018	Steven Universe	Peedee Fryman	Voice, recurring role (10 episodes)
2015	Clarence	Seabass	Voice, episode: "Hoofin' It"
2016–2018	Home: Adventures with Tip & Oh	Fox	Voice, recurring role
2016–2019	The Lion Guard	Ono	Voice, main cast
2017–2022	Pete the Cat	Grumpy Toad	Voice, main cast
2017–2019	Star vs. the Forces of Evil	Dennis	Voice, 3 episodes
2018–2020	Harvey Girls Forever!	Melvin, Lobgrilla	Voice, main cast
2020	Never Have I Ever	Russia Model UN representative	Episode: "...started a nuclear war"
2022–2025	Firebuds	Wayne Riley	Voice, recurring role
2023	Pantheon	Charlie Dugan	Voice, 3 episodes

=== Film ===
Year	Title	Role	Notes
2008	Leaving Barstow	Boy on bus	
2008	Hancock	Boy at bus bench	
2008	An American Carol	Timmy	
2009	The Unborn	Matty Newton	
2009	Opposite Day	Small Man	
2009	Subject: I Love You	Tommy	Voice
2012	Frankenweenie	Edgar "E" Gore	Voice
2013	Super Buddies	Monk-E	Voice
2015	The Lion Guard: Return of the Roar	Ono	Voice, television film
2016	Monkey Up	Mooner	Voice
2017	The Lion Guard: The Rise of Scar	Ono	Voice, television film
2018	I'll Be Next Door for Christmas	Archie	
2019	The Lion Guard: Battle for the Pride Lands	Ono	Voice, television film
2021	Arlo the Alligator Boy	"Kids Things" Kid, Ice Cream Kid, Kid Bully	Voice

=== Radio ===
Year	Title	Role	Notes
2016–present	Adventures in Odyssey	Morrie Rydell	Recurring role

=== Self ===
Year	Title	Notes
2009, 2010, 2011	Jimmy Kimmel Live!	3 episodes
2010, 2013, 2014, 2015	The View	4 episodes
2010, 2017	Entertainment Tonight	2 episodes
2010	The Bonnie Hunt Show	Episode: "30 March 2010"
2010	Lopez Tonight	Episode: "3 November 2010"
2010	The Tonight Show With Jay Leno	Episode: #19.44
2010	79th Annual Hollywood Christmas Parade	Episode: "10 December 2010"
2011	25th Annual Genesis Awards	Episode: "30 April 2011"
2011	Conan	Episode: "The Container Store Of My Discontent"
2011	Extreme Makeover: Home Edition	Episode: "The Sharrock Family"
2012	Good Morning America	Episode: "6 February 2012"
2012	Live with Kelly and Michael	Episode: "6 February 2012"
2012	Made in Hollywood	Episode: #8.3
2013	The Queen Latifah Show	Episode: #1.8
2013	40th Annual Annie Awards	Presenter
2013	The Chew	Episode: "Meals from the Heartland"
2014, 2015, 2018	Home & Family	3 episodes
2015	Celebrity Page	Episode: October 16, 2015
2016	The Real	Episode "15 January 2016"

== Awards and nominations ==
Year	Association	Category	Work	Result	Ref.
2010/11	Young Artist Awards	Outstanding Young Ensemble in a TV Series	The Middle	Nominated	
2013	Annie Awards	Voice Acting in a Feature Production	Frankenweenie	Nominated	
