= Malcolm Todd discography =

Music by singer-songwriter born in 2003

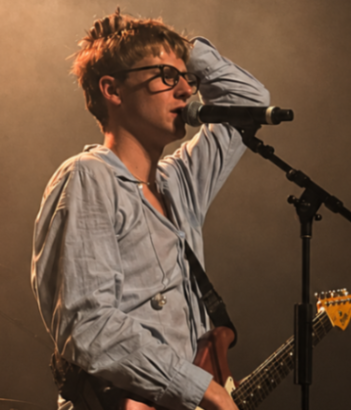
- Studio albums: 2
- EPs: 2
- Mixtapes: 1
- Singles: 18
- Music videos: 18

The discography of American singer-songwriter and record producer Malcolm Todd consists of two studio albums, one mixtape, two extended plays (EPs), and eighteen singles. Todd began writing and self-producing music independently in high school, self-releasing his debut EP Demos Before Prom in May 2022. He followed this with a second self-released EP, Shower Shoes, in March 2023. At this time, his single "Art House" was going viral online.

Todd released his debut mixtape, Sweet Boy, in 2024. Supported by many releases such as "Earrings", the project later debuted on chart listings internationally in 2026, including reaching number 26 on the US Billboard 200. In early 2025, Todd achieved his breakout track "Chest Pain (I Love)", which earned a Platinum certification from the Recording Industry Association of America (RIAA) and reached number 68 on the US Billboard Hot 100. This preceded his self-titled debut studio album, Malcolm Todd, released in April 2025, which peaked at number 49 on the US Billboard 200 and was later reissued as a deluxe edition.

In 2026, Todd's song "Earrings" reached the top 20 of the Billboard Hot 100, the UK Singles Chart, and the Billboard Global 200, while receiving a Platinum certification in the United States. In June 2026, he released his second studio album, Do That Again, supported by the singles "Breathe" and "I Saw Your Face". The album debuted at number five on the US Billboard 200 and reached top-ten positions in Australia and New Zealand, with ten of its tracks entering the US Hot Rock & Alternative Songs chart.

== Studio albums ==
List of studio albums, showing selected details and chart positions
Title	Details	Peak chart positions						
Title	Details	US	AUS	CAN	IRE	LTU	NZ	UK
Malcolm Todd	Released: April 4, 2025; Label: Columbia; Formats: Digital download, LP, CD, streaming	49	61	—	—	—	—	—
Do That Again	Released: June 5, 2026; Label: Columbia; Formats: Digital download, LP, CD, streaming	5	3	14	20	77	7	19

== Mixtapes ==
List of mixtapes, showing selected details, chart positions and certifications
Title	Details	Peak chart positions						Certifications
Title	Details	US	AUS	CAN	LTU	NOR	POR	Certifications
Sweet Boy	Released: April 5, 2024; Label: Columbia; Formats: Digital download, LP, CD, streaming	26	27	35	35	37	198	RIAA: Gold

== Extended plays ==
List of extended plays, showing selected details
Title	Details
Demos Before Prom	Released: May 15, 2022; Label: Self-released; Formats: Digital download
Shower Shoes	Released: March 24, 2023; Label: Self-released; Formats: Digital download

== Singles ==
List of singles released digitally, showing year released, selected chart positions, certifications, and associated album
Title	Year	Peak chart positions										Certifications	Album
Title	Year	US	US Rock	AUS	CAN	IRE	NZ	NOR	SWE	UK	WW	Certifications	Album
"Art House"	2023	—	—	—	—	—	—	—	—	—	—		Sweet Boy
"Sweet Boy"	2023	99	18	—	86	—	—	—	—	—	—	RIAA: Platinum; RMNZ: Gold	Sweet Boy
"Roommates"	2023	— (Note: "Roommates" did not enter the Billboard Hot 100, but peaked at number 1 on the Bubbling Under Hot 100 chart.)	20	—	—	—	—	—	—	—	—	RIAA: Platinum; RMNZ: Gold	Sweet Boy
"Hot in NY"	2023	—	—	—	—	—	—	—	—	—	—		Sweet Boy
"Mr. Incorrect"	2023	—	41	—	—	—	—	—	—	—	—		Sweet Boy
"4Me 4Me"	2024	—	32	—	—	—	—	—	—	—	—		Sweet Boy
"New Friends" (with Eem Triplin)	2024	—	—	—	—	—	—	—	—	—	—		Sweet Boy
"You Owe Me"	2024	—	47	—	—	—	—	—	—	—	—		Non-album singles
"Cute Shirt (Interlude)"	2024	—	—	—	—	—	—	—	—	—	—		Non-album singles
"Comfort Me"	2024	—	—	—	—	—	—	—	—	—	—		Non-album singles
"Chest Pain (I Love)"	2024	68	10	—	78	—	— (Note: "Chest Pain (I Love)" did not enter the NZ Top 40 Singles Chart, but peaked at number 9 on the NZ Hot Singles Chart.)	—	—	93	101	RIAA: Platinum; MC: Gold; RMNZ: Gold	Malcolm Todd
"Bleed" (with Omar Apollo)	2025	—	20	—	—	—	— (Note: "Bleed" did not enter the NZ Top 40 Singles Chart, but peaked at number 6 on the NZ Hot Singles Chart.)	—	—	—	—		Malcolm Todd
"Cheer Me On"	2025	—	—	—	—	—	—	—	—	—	—		Malcolm Todd
"Original"	2025	—	—	—	—	—	—	—	—	—	—		Malcolm Todd (Still)
"Breathe"	2026	75	13	—	—	—	— (Note: "Breathe" did not enter the NZ Top 40 Singles Chart, but peaked at number 4 on the NZ Hot Singles Chart.)	—	—	—	—		Do That Again
"Earrings"	2026	17	2	7	16	12	5	31	38	13	11	RIAA: Platinum; ARIA: Platinum; BPI: Silver; MC: Platinum; RMNZ: Platinum	Sweet Boy
"I Saw Your Face"	2026	75	16	—	78	—	— (Note: "I Saw Your Face" did not enter the NZ Top 40 Singles Chart, but peaked at number 6 on the NZ Hot Singles Chart.)	—	—	—	—		Do That Again
"I Just Got Mad"	2026	—	39	—	—	—	— (Note: "I Just Got Mad" did not enter the NZ Top 40 Singles Chart, but peaked at number 4 on the NZ Hot Singles Chart.)	—	—	—	—		Non-album single
"—" denotes a recording that did not chart in that territory.

== Other charted songs ==
List of other charted songs, showing year released, selected chart positions, and associated album
Title	Year	Peak chart positions						Album
Title	Year	US	US Rock	CAN	IRE	NZ Hot	UK	Album
"Jean Skirt"	2026	—	44	—	—	—	—	Do That Again
"Obsessica"	2026	— (Note: "Obsessica" did not enter the Billboard Hot 100, but peaked at number 1 on the Bubbling Under Hot 100 chart.)	23	78	82	—	70	Do That Again
"Free.99"	2026	— (Note: "Free.99" did not enter the Billboard Hot 100, but peaked at number 12 on the Bubbling Under Hot 100 chart.)	32	—	—	—	—	Do That Again
"Difficult Love"	2026	97	21	—	—	8	—	Do That Again
"Malcolm in the Middle"	2026	— (Note: "Malcolm in the Middle" did not enter the Billboard Hot 100, but peaked at number 1 on the Bubbling Under Hot 100 chart.)	22	—	—	7	—	Do That Again
"Ain't That the Truth"	2026	—	41	—	—	—	—	Do That Again
"Gun to My Head"	2026	— (Note: "Gun to My Head" did not enter the Billboard Hot 100, but peaked at number 11 on the Bubbling Under Hot 100 chart.)	30	—	—	9	—	Do That Again
"X's & O's"	2026	— (Note: "X's & O's" did not enter the Billboard Hot 100, but peaked at number 10 on the Bubbling Under Hot 100 chart.)	29	—	—	10	—	Do That Again
"Lonely Song"	2026	—	45	—	—	—	—	Do That Again
"Do That Again"	2026	—	50	—	—	—	—	Do That Again
"—" denotes a recording that did not chart in that territory.

== Music videos ==
List of music videos, showing year released and director name
Title	Year	Director(s)	Ref.
"What's Up"	2023	Cultivision	
"Intercourse"	2023	Cult Classic	
"Sweet Boy"	2023	Cultivision	
"Roommates"	2023	Malcolm Todd and Colin Tunney	
"Hot in NY"	2023	Malcolm Todd and Yondoby	
"Mr. Incorrect"	2023	Malcolm Todd and Colin Tunney	
"4Me 4Me"	2024	Malcolm Todd and Colin Tunney	
"New Friends"	2024	Malcolm Todd and Colin Tunney	
"Cute Shirt (Interlude)"	2024	Unknown	
"Comfort Me"	2024	Malcolm Todd and Colin Tunney	
"Bleed"	2025	Aidan Cullen	
"Cheer Me On"	2025	Malcolm Todd	
"Concrete"	2025	Audrey Hobert and Malcolm Todd	
"Chest Pain (I Love)"	2025	Aidan Cullen	
"Original"	2025	Aidan Cullen	
"Breathe"	2026	Aidan Cullen	
"I Saw Your Face"	2026	Aidan Cullen and Malcolm Todd	
"Difficult Love"	2026	Aidan Cullen and Malcolm Todd	
