= Do That Again World Tour =

2026 concert tour by Malcolm Todd

- Tour by Malcolm Todd
- Promotional poster
- Location: North America; Asia; Europe; Oceania
- Associated album: Do That Again
- Start date: September 2, 2026
- End date: May 21, 2027
- Legs: 4
- No. of shows: 62
- Supporting acts: 54 Ultra; Natanya; Maden Lane
- Website: www.malcolmtodd.cool#/tour/

Malcolm Todd concert chronology
- The Wholesome Rockstar Tour (2025); Do That Again World Tour (2026)

The Do That Again World Tour is the third concert tour by American singer-songwriter Malcolm Todd, in support of his second studio album, Do That Again (2026). It began on September 2, 2026, in Irving, with shows across the North America, Asia, Europe and Oceania. The tour will conclude in Perth on May 21, 2027, comprising 62 shows. 54 Ultra, Natanya and Maden Lane will join as supporting act.

== Announcement ==
On June 8, 2026, Todd announced the Do That Again Tour, a North American headline tour promoted by Live Nation. The run is preceded by festival appearances at the Osheaga Music & Arts Festival in Montreal on August 1 and the Outside Lands Music and Arts Festival in San Francisco on August 8, 2026. An artist presale opened on June 9, 2026, ahead of the general on-sale on June 11.

The initially announced 27-show North American run sold out shortly after tickets went on sale in June 2026. Additional performances were added in Austin, Atlanta, Philadelphia, New York, Toronto, Chicago, Seattle, Oakland and Los Angeles, expanding the tour to 38 shows; the added dates also subsequently sold out. The tour concludes with three consecutive nights at the Greek Theatre in Los Angeles on October 28, 29 and 30, 2026. On September 14, 2026, Todd announced the tour dates for Asia, Europe, and Oceania via his Instagram.

== Set list ==
This set list was taken from the show in Irving on September 2, 2026. It does not represent all shows throughout the tour.

1. "Jean Skirt"
2. "Breathe"
3. "Malcolm in the Middle"
4. "Free.99"
5. "Difficult Love"
6. "Ain't That The Truth"
7. "Walk to Class"
8. "Bleed"
9. "You Owe Me"
10. "X's & O's"
11. "Obsessica"
12. "4Me 4Me"
13. "Mr. Incorrect"
14. "Sweet Boy"
15. "Make Me a Better Man"
16. "Gun To My Head"
17. "Good Bye"
18. "Cheer Me On"
19. "Chest Pain (I Love)"
20. "Earrings"
21. "I Saw Your Face"
22. "Do That Again"
23. "Roommates"

== Tour dates ==
List of 2026 concerts, showing date, city, country and venue
Date (2026)	City	Country	Venue	Supporting act
September 2	Irving	United States	The Pavilion at Toyota Music Factory	54 Ultra
September 3	Houston	United States	713 Music Hall	54 Ultra
September 5	Austin	United States	ACL Live at The Moody Theater	54 Ultra
September 6	Austin	United States	ACL Live at The Moody Theater	54 Ultra
September 9	Fort Lauderdale	United States	War Memorial Auditorium	54 Ultra
September 10	Orlando	United States	Hard Rock Live Orlando	54 Ultra
September 12	Atlanta	United States	Coca-Cola Roxy	54 Ultra
September 13	Atlanta	United States	Coca-Cola Roxy	54 Ultra
September 15	Charlotte	United States	Skyla Credit Union Amphitheatre	54 Ultra
September 16	Raleigh	United States	Red Hat Amphitheater	54 Ultra
September 18	Philadelphia	United States	The Met	54 Ultra
September 19	Philadelphia	United States	The Met	54 Ultra
September 20	Washington, D.C.	United States	The Anthem	54 Ultra
September 22	New York City	United States	Radio City Music Hall	54 Ultra
September 23	New York City	United States	Radio City Music Hall	54 Ultra
September 26	Boston	United States	MGM Music Hall at Fenway	—N/a
September 28	Toronto	Canada	History	54 Ultra
September 29	Toronto	Canada	History	54 Ultra
October 1	Detroit	United States	Fox Theatre	54 Ultra
October 3	Nashville	United States	The Truth	54 Ultra
October 4	Maryland Heights	United States	Saint Louis Music Park	54 Ultra
October 6	Chicago	United States	The Salt Shed	54 Ultra
October 7	Chicago	United States	The Salt Shed	54 Ultra
October 9	Minneapolis	United States	The Armory	54 Ultra
October 11	Denver	United States	The Mission Ballroom	54 Ultra
October 12	Denver	United States	The Mission Ballroom	54 Ultra
October 13	Salt Lake City	United States	The Union Event Center	54 Ultra
October 15	Seattle	United States	Paramount Theatre	54 Ultra
October 16	Seattle	United States	Paramount Theatre	54 Ultra
October 18	Vancouver	Canada	PNE Forum	54 Ultra
October 19	Portland	United States	Arlene Schnitzer Concert Hall	54 Ultra
October 21	Oakland	United States	Fox Theater	54 Ultra
October 22	Oakland	United States	Fox Theater	54 Ultra
October 24	San Diego	United States	Gallagher Square	54 Ultra
October 25	Phoenix	United States	Arizona Financial Theatre	54 Ultra
October 28	Los Angeles	United States	Greek Theatre	54 Ultra
October 29	Los Angeles	United States	Greek Theatre	54 Ultra
October 30	Los Angeles	United States	Greek Theatre	54 Ultra
November 23	Taipei	Taiwan	TICC	—N/a
November 25	Tokyo	Japan	KT Zepp Yokohama	—N/a
November 27	Manila	Philippines	New Frontier Theater	—N/a
November 30	Singapore		The Star Theatre	—N/a
December 2	Seoul	South Korea	Myunghwa Live Hall	—N/a
December 6	Bangkok	Thailand	UOB Live	—N/a
December 9	Kuala Lumpur	Malaysia	Zepp Kuala Lumpur	—N/a
December 10	Kuala Lumpur	Malaysia	Zepp Kuala Lumpur	—N/a
December 12	Jakarta	Indonesia	GBK Basketball Hall	—N/a

List of 2027 concerts, showing date, city, country and venue
Date (2027)	City	Country	Venue	Supporting act
February 12	Stockholm	Sweden	Fryshuset Arenan	Natanya
February 14	Copenhagen	Denmark	K.B. Hallen	Natanya
February 15	Cologne	Germany	Palladium	Natanya
February 18	Brussels	Belgium	Forest National	Natanya
February 19	Berlin	Germany	Columbiahalle	Natanya
February 21	Amsterdam	Netherlands	AFAS Live	Natanya
February 22	Paris	France	Zénith Paris	Natanya
February 24	Dublin	Ireland	3Arena	Natanya
February 25	Glasgow	United Kingdom	Barrowland Ballroom	Natanya
February 27	Birmingham	United Kingdom	O2 Academy Birmingham	Natanya
February 28	Manchester	United Kingdom	O2 Apollo Manchester	Natanya
March 3	London	United Kingdom	O2 Academy Brixton	Natanya
May 12	Brisbane	Australia	Riverstage	Maden Lane
May 14	Sydney	Australia	Hordern Pavilion	Maden Lane
May 17	Melbourne	Australia	Festival Hall	Maden Lane
May 21	Perth	Australia	Peth HPC	Maden Lane
