= Christine Shin =

South Korean–born writer–director

- Born: South Korea
- Occupation(s): Film director, screenwriter

Christine Shin is a South Korean–born writer–director.

== Early life and education ==
After growing up in South Korea, Shin relocated in her adolescence to the United States. Already aware that she wanted to be involved in film, Shin attended the University of Wisconsin and USC School of Cinematic Arts, receiving respectively a B.A. degree in Communication Arts and English Literature and an M.F.A. in Film & TV Production.

== Recognition ==
In 2005, Shin was honored by Film Independent (IFP/LA) as part of its Project Involve. She was also one of the finalists for 2007–2008 Disney/ABC/DGA Directing Fellowship. Her feature film project My Fake Husband, was selected as one of the fellows for the 2008 Filmmakers' Development Lab by the Korean Film Council. The same script was also chosen as one of the finalists for 2008 New Writers Awards by Coalition of Asian Pacifics in Entertainment and Fox.

Her graduate thesis film Janie (2006), which received the Cine Golden Eagle Award, an Audience Award for 'Best Short Film' at Dances With Films Film Festival, and a Gold Remi at WorldFest-Houston International Film Festival, had its television premiere on KCET (then a PBS affiliate) as a part of 2006 Fine Cut Series.

== Filmography ==
- Journey is a 2004 short film, written and directed by Christine Shin. It was first released in the United States on December 10, 2004 as a part of the Hollywood DV Festival where it received the 'Best Actress Award'.
- Janie is a 2006 short film, written, directed, and produced by Christine Shin, which was selected at the 2005 East Lansing Children's Film Festival, which is an offshoot of the East Lansing Film Festival.
- My Fake Husband is a romantic comedy film, written and to be directed by Christine Shin. It received the 2008 fellowship from Filmmakers Development Lab by the Korean Film Council and was selected as a runner-up for 2008 New Writers Award by Coalition of Asian Pacifics in Entertainment and Fox.

=== Additional films ===
- Encounter (2013) (writer/director)
- Searching for Angels (2006) (producer)
- Movie Date (2006) (writer/director)
