= Harry Styles (disambiguation) =

Harry Styles (born 1994) is an English singer-songwriter and actor.

Harry Styles may also refer to:

- Harry Styles (album), his eponymous album, 2017
- Harry Styles: Live on Tour, first world tour of the singer-songwriter of the same name (2017–2018)
- "Harry Styles", a song by Malcolm Todd from Malcolm Todd, 2025
