= Janie (2006 film) =

- Directed by: Christine Shin
- Written by: Christine Shin
- Produced by: Judith Fernando; Christine Shin
- Starring: Blaine Saunders; Tanner Maguire
- Cinematography: Pyongson Yim
- Edited by: Peter Samet
- Music by: Patrick Kirst
- Production company: University of Southern California
- Release date: February 6, 2006
- Running time: 18 minutes
- Country: United States
- Language: English
- Budget: $40,000 (estimated)

Janie is a short film, written and directed by Christine Shin. Janie was selected as the 2005 Charles and Lucille King Finishing Fund.Janie was first released in the United States on February 26, 2006 as a part of the East Lansing Children's Film Festival, which is an offshoot of the East Lansing Film Festival. It stars Blaine Saunders, Tanner Maguire, Deborah Quayle, John Miailovich, and Katrina Feickert.

== Synopsis ==
Janie, a 9-year-old girl, has a perfect life as an only daughter in a loving family. Her life, however, gets completely shattered when Ben, the little brother she never knew existed, unexpectedly shows up to live with her family.

== Cast ==
- Blaine Saunders as Janie
- Tanner Maguire as Ben
- Deborah Quayle as Grace
- John Miailovich as Richard
- Kabrina Feickert as Ben's Mother
