= Jasper Harris =

American music producer and songwriter

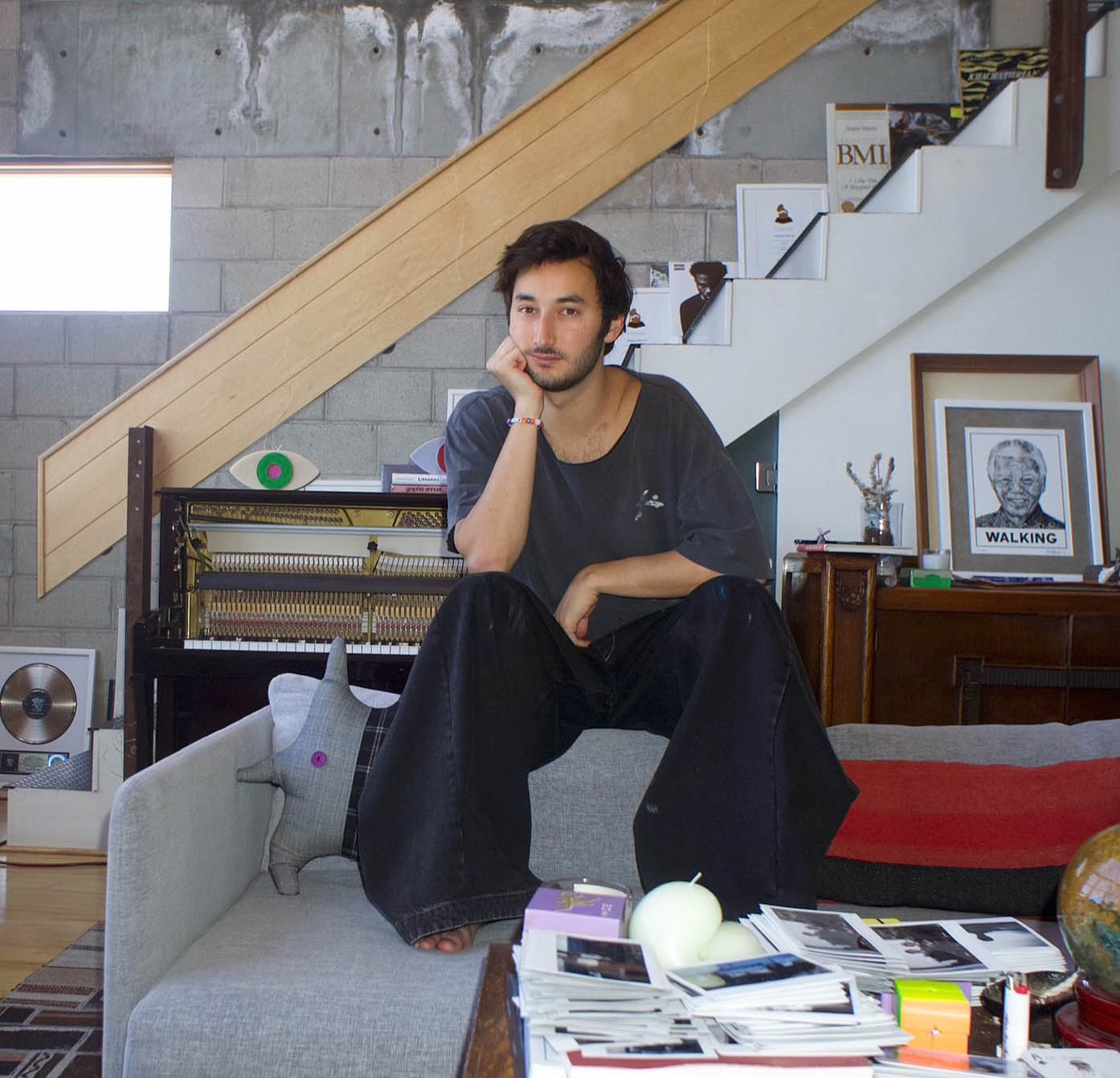
- Harris in 2021

Background information
- Born: Jasper Lee Harris; October 24, 1998 (age 28); Los Angeles, California, United States
- Genres: Hip hop; pop; trap; R&B
- Occupations: Record producer; songwriter
- Years active: 2018–present

Jasper Lee Harris (born 1998 or 1999) is an American music producer and songwriter. He was nominated for a Grammy Award for Best Rap Song for "Family Ties" by Baby Keem and Kendrick Lamar, on which he served as a co-producer and songwriter. In 2022, Harris was nominated for a Grammy Award for producing and songwriting on Montero by Lil Nas X. Harris's work has included producing Jack Harlow's 2022 Billboard Hot 100 number one single "First Class".

== Early life and education ==
Harris is a native of Los Angeles, California. He attended NYU’s Tisch School of the Arts. While a student at NYU, Harris met the production and songwriting team Take a Daytrip and began working for them as a studio assistant. He later dropped out of NYU and returned to Los Angeles to begin a full-time music career.

== Career ==
In 2019, Harris co-wrote the song "Vibez" for rapper DaBaby.

As a co-producer and songwriter on "Family Ties" by Baby Keem and Kendrick Lamar, Harris was nominated for a Grammy Award for Best Rap Song.

Harris co-produced Jack Harlow's 2022 single "First Class", which was number one on both the Billboard Hot 100 and Top 40. He was nominated for a Grammy Award in 2022 for producing and songwriting on Montero by Lil Nas X. The same year, Harris co-produced " I Like You" by Doja Cat and Post Malone, which was number on the Top 40 and nominated for the 2022 Grammy Award for Best Pop Duo/Group Performance.

In 2023, Harris co-wrote and produced the single "Greedy" by Canadian performer Tate McRae, which was number one on the Top 40 and Billboard Global 200.

He worked with Kanye West and Ty Dolla Sign on their collaborative album Vultures 1 (2024), as a producer on its title track, alongside Ambezza, Gustave Rudman Rambali, Jae Deal, Marlonwiththeglasses also known as Chordz, Ojivolta, Prodbyjuice and Wheezy.

Along with El Guincho, Harris co-wrote and produced an album for Camila Cabello titled C,XOXO; the first single from the album, "I Luv It", was released in March, 2024.

In 2026, Harris co-wrote and produced the song "Hooligan" by BTS, as well as "FF" by Troye Sivan. He also contributed to six tracks on Malcolm Todd's album "Do That Again."

Harris also produced the single "Housewife" by Tate McRae alongside Ryan Tedder, Grant Boutin, El Guincho, and Aaron Shadrow.

== Personal life ==
As of February 2021, Harris lives in Los Angeles, California.

== Select Discography ==
| Year | Title | Artist | Album |
|---|---|---|---|
| 2026 | "Housewife" | Tate McRae | TBA |
| 2026 | "FF" | Troye Sivan | She's the Best |
| 2026 | "Hooligan" | BTS | Arirang |
| 2026 | "Obsessica" | Malcolm Todd | Do That Again |
| 2026 | "Breathe" | Malcolm Todd | Do That Again |
| 2026 | "RedRed" | Cortis | GreenGreen |
| 2024 | "Everything is romantic" | Charli xcx | Brat |
| 2024 | "I Luv It" | Camila Cabello feat. Playboi Carti | C,XOXO |
| 2023 | "Run for the Hills" | Tate McRae | Think Later |
| 2023 | "Greedy" | Tate McRae | Think Later |
| 2022 | "First Class" | Jack Harlow | Come Home the Kids Miss You |
| 2022 | "I Like You (A Happier Song)" | Post Malone feat. Doja Cat | Twelve Carat Toothache |
| 2021 | "family ties" | Baby Keem feat. Kendrick Lamar | The Melodic Blue |
| 2020 | "Vamp Anthem" | Playboi Carti | Whole Lotta Red |
