= The Middle season 2 =

The Middle
- Season 2
- Region 1 DVD cover
- Starring: Patricia Heaton; Neil Flynn; Charlie McDermott; Eden Sher; Atticus Shaffer; Chris Kattan
- No. of episodes: 24

Release
- Original network: ABC
- Original release: September 22, 2010 – May 25, 2011

Season chronology
- ← Previous; Season 1 Next → Season 3

The second season of the television comedy series The Middle aired between September 22, 2010, and May 25, 2011, on ABC in the United States. It was produced by Blackie and Blondie Productions and Warner Bros. Television with series creators DeAnn Heline and Eileen Heisler as executive producers.

The show features Frances "Frankie" Heck (Patricia Heaton), a working-class, Midwestern woman married to Mike Heck (Neil Flynn) who resides in the small fictional town of Orson, Indiana. They are the parents of three children, Axl (Charlie McDermott), Sue (Eden Sher), and Brick (Atticus Shaffer).

== Cast ==
=== Main cast ===
- Patricia Heaton as Frankie Heck
- Neil Flynn as Mike Heck
- Charlie McDermott as Axl Heck
- Eden Sher as Sue Heck
- Atticus Shaffer as Brick Heck
- Chris Kattan as Bob

=== Recurring cast ===
- Brock Ciarlelli as Brad, Sue's ex-boyfriend He appears in the following episodes.

The Diaper Incident & Super Sunday.

- Blaine Saunders as Carly, Sue's best friend She appears in the following episodes.

The Diaper Incident, Halloween, Errand Boy, Valentine's Day II, Friends, Lies & Videotapes, The Prom & The Bridge.

- Jen Ray as Nancy Donahue, the Hecks' neighbor. She appears in the following episodes.

Foreign Exchange, Taking Back The House, Spring Cleaning, The Legacy & The Bridge.

- Beau Wirick as Sean Donahue, Axl's friend. He appears in the following episodes.

Homecoming, The Diaper Incident, Halloween, A Birthday Story, Errand Boy, Friends, Lies & Videotapes, The Prom & The Bridge.

- Brian Doyle-Murray as Don Elhert, owner of the car dealership where Frankie and Bob work. He appears in the following episodes.

Back To School, Homecoming, The Quarry, Super Sunday & Mother's Day II

=== Guest cast ===
- Doris Roberts as Mrs. Rinsky, Brick's third grade teacher ("Back to School", "The Math Class", "Back to Summer").
- Matthew Moy as Takayuki, a foreign exchange student from Japan ("Foreign Exchange").
- Sarah Wright as Kasey, Axl's new manager at the movie theater ("A Birthday Story").
- Norm Macdonald as Rusty Heck, Mike's brother ("Thanksgiving II").
- John Cullum as "Big" Mike Heck Sr., Mike's father ("Thanksgiving II").
- Marsha Mason as Pat Spence, Frankie's mother ("A Simple Christmas").
- Jerry Van Dyke as Tag Spence, Frankie's father ("A Simple Christmas").
- Mary-Pat Green as Mrs. Larimer, the principal of Orson Elementary ("The Math Class").

== Episodes ==
No. overall	No. in season	Title	Directed by	Written by	Original release date	Prod. code	U.S. viewers (millions)
25	1	"Back to School"	Wendey Stanzler	DeAnn Heline & Eileen Heisler	September 22, 2010	3X6501	8.80
The first day of the new school year is full of chaos.
26	2	"Homecoming"	Ken Whittingham	Rob Ulin	September 29, 2010	3X6502	8.35
When she discovers that Sue's first cross-country meet is the same day as Axl's homecoming game, Frankie's dream of escorting Axl across the field is put in jeopardy. Meanwhile, Mike has Brick rake up the leaves in the backyard, and is surprised when he wants to release them in the forest instead of taking them to the dump.
27	3	"The Diaper Incident"	Wendey Stanzler	Vijal Patel	October 6, 2010	3X6503	8.03
During a mission to buy Sue diapers for the baby she is babysitting, a clerk makes the assumption that Frankie is the one who needs diapers, depressing Frankie. Later, after getting on Mike's case to get a physical exam done, Frankie experiences back pain and hides it from Mike, who tells her he received a clean bill of health from the doctor. Meanwhile, a clueless Sue falls for Axl's friend, Sean, who barely notices her existence; and Brick tests various urban legends that parents tell their kids - such as not to swallow a watermelon seed for fear that one will grow in their belly - after discovering Frankie has used these lies on him before.
28	4	"The Quarry"	Lee Shallat Chemel	Alex Reid	October 13, 2010	3X6505	7.98
When Axl is suspended for skipping school, he hopes to relax at home, but Mike gets him a job at the quarry. Meanwhile, Frankie fears that she accidentally prayed away Sue's cross-country team after it gets cut by the school; and while practicing a magic trick, Brick makes the main TV remote disappear - and can't figure out how to make it reappear.
29	5	"Foreign Exchange"	Paul Lazarus	Jana Hunter & Mitch Hunter	October 20, 2010	3X6506	8.54
Frankie insists that the family host Takiyuki, a foreign exchange student from Japan. When the serious, emotionless student does not take an interest in the family, Frankie plans a road trip, during which the car breaks down. The family then learns Takiyuki is interested in fixing things and spends the rest of his time in America doing so. Back in Japan, it is revealed Takiyuki's family behaves similarly to the Hecks, with Takiyuki behaving like a combination of both Axl and Brick.
30	6	"Halloween"	Jamie Babbit	Roy Brown	October 27, 2010	3X6507	9.54
Frankie tries to persuade Mike to attend a neighborhood Halloween party. Meanwhile, Sue attends a church-sponsored Halloween event, Brick's costume is unrecognizable by most adults, and Axl and his friends try to make their way to a haunted house, but their car breaks down en route.
31	7	"A Birthday Story"	Ken Whittingham	Vijal Patel	November 3, 2010	3X6508	9.42
For his ninth birthday, Brick wants to hear the story of what happened when he was born, which puts the family in an awkward position. Meanwhile, Axl deals with his new beautiful but incompetent manager at the movie theater.
32	8	"Errand Boy"	Lee Shallat Chemel	Tim Hobert	November 17, 2010	3X6509	9.29
Brick is tired of accompanying Frankie on errands and wants to stay home alone, but she won't let him. When he is left home alone, he ends up ruining a family heirloom. Axl tries to grow a beard. Mike overhears one of Sue's friends talking about her behind her back.
33	9	"Thanksgiving II"	Ken Whittingham	Rob Ulin	November 24, 2010	3X6504	8.25
Mike invites his brother Rusty (Norm Macdonald) and their father to Thanksgiving. Hearing them have a rather superficial conversation, Frankie encourages Mike to discuss feelings with his brother and father. Brick is very excited that Bob's librarian girlfriend Linda shares his great love of books. Sue bakes an apple pie with Frankie.
34	10	"A Simple Christmas"	Elliot Hegarty	Mitch Hunter & Jana Hunter	December 8, 2010	3X6510	8.68
Frankie's parents (Marsha Mason and Jerry Van Dyke) are in town for Christmas and the pair soon interfere in their daughter's plans for a quiet Christmas. Frankie's father constantly follows Mike around, annoying him; and Frankie's mother angers her by interfering constantly. Axl builds Brick an igloo and with Sue's help they defend it from the Glossner boys.
35	11	"Taking Back the House"	Barnet Kellman	DeAnn Heline & Eileen Heisler	January 5, 2011	3X6511	9.31
Tired of being treated like servants in their own castle, Frankie and Mike attempt to regain complete control of the household by ignoring the kids' demands for rides, particular foods, and services, and focusing on their own needs, including what to watch on TV.
36	12	"The Big Chill"	Lee Shallat Chemel	Rob Ulin	January 12, 2011	3X6512	10.09
Mike becomes mad at Frankie for accidentally spending $200 on eye cream. Meanwhile, Axl must take care of an infant doll for health class, forcing Brick to bunk with Sue, and they accidentally make a hole in Sue's bedroom wall and make it bigger by trying to fix it.
37	13	"Super Sunday"	Paul Lazarus	Vijal Patel	January 19, 2011	3X6513	8.32
The Super Bowl is coming up, and the Hecks want to spend it together as a family. Sue and Brad enter a square-dancing competition, but Sue can't dance at all. Frankie's boss tricks her into accompanying him to a hospital appointment during the Super Bowl. Mike encourages Brick to read about the NFL, but Brick goes crazy with reciting all of his facts, causing Mike's friends to leave the Hecks' house during the Super Bowl.
38	14	"Valentine's Day II"	Lee Shallat Chemel	Roy Brown	February 9, 2011	3X6515	8.84
Axl starts dating a girl his parents aren't exactly pleased with, while Sue finds the boy who kissed her during a Halloween hayride. Meanwhile, Brick has a crush on a girl from his class, but Mike humiliates his shy son by telling her.
39	15	"Friends, Lies and Videotape"	Alex Reid	Tim Hobert	February 16, 2011	3X6514	7.85
Frankie finds Brick a friend. Sue and a girlfriend sneak into an R-rated movie. Axl shoots footage of his sexy biology teacher.
40	16	"Hecks on a Plane"	Elliot Hegarty	DeAnn Heline & Eileen Heisler	February 23, 2011	3X6516	7.96
Sue wins tickets for the family to visit New York, but the plane ride turns into a comedy of errors, including members of the family fighting over who gets to sit in first class.
41	17	"The Math Class"	Alex Reid	Jana Hunter & Mitch Hunter	March 2, 2011	3X6517	7.86
Ms. Rinsky (Doris Roberts) asks Frankie and Mike to attend a math class after Frankie criticizes her teaching skills when Brick receives a D on a math test. Meanwhile, Sue and Axl consider helping their aunt find a time capsule she buried.
42	18	"Spring Cleaning"	Barnet Kellman	Vijal Patel	March 23, 2011	3X6518	7.05
The Hecks spend spring break trying to clean out the house; Frankie finds an old, unflattering list Mike had written about her when they were dating; Brick opens an information stand where he sells advice for a dollar; Axl and Sue are caught dropping off items outside the thrift store after closing hours.
43	19	"The Legacy"	Adam Davidson	Rob Ulin	April 13, 2011	3X6519	6.14
Frustrated by Axl's sloppiness, Mike keeps him from playing the final basketball game of the season, but then relents at the last minute. Brick is forced to wear his cousin's hand-me-down clothes. Sue wins a trophy for "punctuality". She and Brick have another run-in with the Glossner boys, and Brick gets locked in the Glossner's garage.
44	20	"Royal Wedding"	Ken Whittingham	Vijal Patel	April 20, 2011	3X6520	6.82
The British Royal Wedding becomes Frankie's obsession and she buys countless Royal Wedding paraphernalia and borrows an enormous new TV to watch the ceremony. Meanwhile, the workers at Mike's quarry go on strike because budget cuts stop him from buying pretzels; and Brick helps Sue audition for the school's news team.
45	21	"Mother's Day II"	Lee Shallat Chemel	Tim Hobert	May 4, 2011	3X6521	7.08
Mike and the kids present Frankie with the perfect Mother's Day gift: a day to herself. While the rest of them enjoy rural festivals in another county, Frankie somehow gets none of the things done she had planned. Mike offers to repeat the trip with her and the family the next weekend, but many of the activities have closed by the time they arrive.
46	22	"The Prom"	Ken Whittingham	Michael Saltzman	May 11, 2011	3X6522	7.25
After learning that Axl accidentally text-invited the wrong girl to prom and plans to solve the situation by standing her up, Frankie and Mike demand that he meet the girl face-to-face to gently break off the date in time for her to get another, or face the music and take her to the big event. Meanwhile, Sue and her friend Carly earnestly try to fit in with the school's "B" crowd during lunch; and after a successful first show, Brick begins to bore Frankie and Mike with his repeated, impromptu one-man plays in the living room.
47	23	"The Bridge"	Lee Shallat Chemel	Roy Brown	May 18, 2011	3X6523	7.68
Frankie and Mike attempt to cure Brick of his irrational fear of crossing over bridges. Meanwhile, Axl is pitted against friend Sean Donahue when a lifeguard position opens up at the local public pool, and Frankie is ready to pull her hair out when she tries to help an indecisive, emotional Sue pick out a two-piece bathing suit to wear on the pool's opening day.
48	24	"Back to Summer"	Ken Whittingham	DeAnn Heline & Eileen Heisler	May 25, 2011	3X6524	7.33
With only three days left until summer vacation, Frankie is ecstatic that she's made it through another school year with the family. But her happiness turns to panic when she and Mike learn at the last minute that Brick needs to write a daily journal and turn it in to Ms. Rinsky or risk not moving up to the fourth grade; that Axl hasn't fulfilled his required 30 hours of community service; and that, because of an error, Sue must prove that she never took a sick day from school in order to receive a perfect attendance award at her middle-school graduation ceremony. Final appearance of Chris Kattan as a series regular.

== Ratings ==
No.	Title	Air date	Rating/Share (18–49)	Viewers (million)	Reference
1	"Back to School"	September 22, 2010	2.7/8	8.80	
2	"Homecoming"	September 29, 2010	2.5/8	8.35	
3	"The Diaper Incident"	October 6, 2010	2.5/8	8.03	
4	"The Quarry"	October 13, 2010	2.5/8	7.98	
5	"Foreign Exchange"	October 20, 2010	2.6/8	8.54	
6	"Halloween"	October 27, 2010	2.9/9	9.54	
7	"A Birthday Story"	November 3, 2010	2.9/9	9.42	
8	"Errand Boy"	November 17, 2010	2.8/9	9.29	
9	"Thanksgiving II"	November 24, 2010	2.2/7	8.25	
10	"A Simple Christmas"	December 8, 2010	2.4/7	8.68	
11	"Taking Back the House"	January 5, 2011	2.8/9	9.31	
12	"The Big Chill"	January 12, 2011	3.0/9	10.09	
13	"Super Sunday"	January 19, 2011	2.6/8	8.32	
14	"Valentine's Day II"	February 9, 2011	2.6/7	8.84	
15	"Friends, Lies and Videotape"	February 16, 2011	2.3/7	7.85	
16	"Hecks on a Plane"	February 23, 2011	2.4/7	7.96	
17	"The Math Class"	March 2, 2011	2.3/7	7.86	
18	"Spring Cleaning"	March 23, 2011	2.0/6	7.05	
19	"The Legacy"	April 13, 2011	1.8/6	6.14	
20	"Royal Wedding"	April 20, 2011	1.9/6	6.82	
21	"Mother's Day II"	May 4, 2011	2.0/6	7.08	
22	"The Prom"	May 11, 2011	2.2/7	7.25	
23	"The Bridge"	May 18, 2011	2.4/8	7.68	
24	"Back to Summer"	May 25, 2011	2.2/7	7.33	
