= The Middle season 3 =

The Middle
- Season 3
- Region 1 DVD cover art
- Starring: Patricia Heaton; Neil Flynn; Charlie McDermott; Eden Sher; Atticus Shaffer
- No. of episodes: 24

Release
- Original network: ABC
- Original release: September 21, 2011 – May 23, 2012

Season chronology
- ← Previous; Season 2 Next → Season 4

The third season of the television comedy series The Middle began airing on September 21, 2011, and concluded on May 23, 2012, on ABC in the United States. It is produced by Blackie and Blondie Productions and Warner Bros. Television with series creators DeAnn Heline and Eileen Heisler as executive producers.

The show features Frances "Frankie" Heck (Patricia Heaton), a working-class, Midwestern woman married to Mike Heck (Neil Flynn) who resides in the small fictional town of Orson, Indiana. They are the parents of three children, Axl (Charlie McDermott), Sue (Eden Sher), and Brick (Atticus Shaffer).

== Cast ==
=== Main cast ===
- Patricia Heaton as Frankie Heck
- Neil Flynn as Mike Heck
- Charlie McDermott as Axl Heck
- Eden Sher as Sue Heck
- Atticus Shaffer as Brick Heck

=== Recurring cast ===
- Chris Kattan as Bob, Frankie's best friend at work. He appears in the following episodes.

Bad Choices, Heck's Best Thing, The Play, A Christmas Gift, The Telling & The Wedding.

- Brock Ciarlelli as Brad, Sue's ex-boyfriend. He appears in the following episodes.

Bad Choices, Year Of The Heck's, The Map, The Telling & The Wedding.

- Blaine Saunders as Carly, Sue's best friend. She appears in the following episodes.

Forced Family Fun Part 1, Valentine's Day III & The Telling.

- Jen Ray as Nancy Donahue, the Heck's neighbor. She appears in the following episodes.

Forced Family Fun Part 1, The Test, Bad Choices, A Christmas Gift, Hecking It Up & Valentine's Day III.

- Beau Wirick as Sean Donahue, Axl's best friend. He appears in the following episodes.

Forced Family Fun Part 1, Bad Choices, Halloween II, Hecking It Up, Valentine's Day III, The Concert, The Clover & The Wedding.

- Brian Doyle-Murray as Don Elhert, owner of the car dealership where Frankie and Bob work. He appears in the following episodes.

Major Changes & The Telling.

- Moises Arias as Matt, Sue's first real boyfriend. He appears in the following episodes.

The Map, Hecking It Up, Valentine's Day III & The Paper Route

=== Guest cast ===
- Ray Romano as Nicky Kohlbrenner, a not so pleasant blast from Frankie and Mike's past. He appears in flashbacks in "Forced Family Fun".
  - This episode is a reunion between Romano and Heaton, who played husband-and-wife duo Ray Barone and Debra Barone on Romano's sitcom, Everybody Loves Raymond (CBS, 1996–2005).
- Chord Overstreet as Mr. Wilkerson, Brick's fourth grade teacher. He appears in "Hecking Order".
- Mary-Pat Green as Mrs. Larimer, the principal of Orson Elementary. She appears in "The Test".
- Casey Sander as Jack Tracy, a football scout who interviews Axl. He appears in "The Test" and "Heck's Best Thing".
- Norm Macdonald as Rusty Heck, Mike's brother. He appears in "The Play" and "The Wedding".
- Marsha Mason as Pat Spence, Frankie's mother. She appears in "Major Changes" and "Thanksgiving III".
- Jerry Van Dyke as Tag Spence, Frankie's father. He appears in "Thanksgiving III".
- Molly Shannon as Janet, Frankie's sister. She appears in "Thanksgiving III".
- Ed Asner as Ben, the town's veteran newsman. He appears in "The Paper Route".
- Richard Gant as Pastor Watkins. He appears in "Get Your Business Done".
- Whoopi Goldberg as Mrs. Marsh, Sue's school guidance counselor. She appears in "The Guidance Counselor".
- John Cullum as Big Mike, Mike's father. He appears in "The Clover" and "The Wedding".
- Brandon Scott as Cory, a technician. He appears in "The Concert".
- Mary Birdsong as Marlene, Rusty's wife. She appears in "The Wedding".

== Episodes ==
No. overall	No. in season	Title	Directed by	Written by	Original release date	Prod. code	U.S. viewers (millions)
49	1	"Forced Family Fun"	Lee Shallat Chemel	Vijal Patel	September 21, 2011	3X6901	9.74
50	2	"Forced Family Fun"	Ken Whittingham	Vijal Patel	September 21, 2011	3X6902	9.74
With the summer winding down and school about to start, Frankie realizes that all of their neighbors have gone on family vacations over the summer, yet the Hecks have spent their entire summer in Orson, Indiana. So she asks Mike to go on a "quick and cheap" vacation with the kids, and the only thing that they can think of is camping. However, when the kids refuse to cooperate and enjoy the great outdoors, she is reminded of her ruined honeymoon camping experience, involving Nicky (Ray Romano), an acquaintance of Mike's from high school.
51	3	"Hecking Order"	Elliot Hegarty	Roy Brown	September 28, 2011	3X6903	8.68
When Mike learns that Brick is skipping gym class, he must talk to his son's fourth grade teacher (Chord Overstreet). Meanwhile, Axl persuades new freshman Sue to schedule a swim class that leaves her with little time for traveling through the hallway to her next class—thus keeping her from stopping at Axl's locker and embarrassing him. Elsewhere, Frankie is shocked that the kids feel that Mike is superior to her in the household.
52	4	"Major Changes"	Lee Shallat Chemel	Eileen Heisler & DeAnn Heline	October 5, 2011	3X6904	9.13
After being humiliated because she accidentally ate Axl's toenail trimmings, Frankie has a meltdown and demands major changes in every aspect of the Heck household—then she abruptly packs up and leaves, heading (unbeknownst to her family) to her mother's (Marsha Mason) house for a little TLC and motherly advice. While Mike goes to get Frankie, Brick once again rambles about something (a food catalog) that only he cares about, Sue is worried about living in a torn household, and Axl freaks out when he discovers that Frankie walked out with his prized hat.
53	5	"The Test"	Elliot Hegarty	Tim Hobert	October 12, 2011	3X6905	8.87
Axl has not studied for his PSATs, much to the dismay of Frankie, who fears for her son's future. Meanwhile, Sue tries out for cheerleading and awaits a phone call welcoming her to the squad. Elsewhere, Mike tries to toughen up Brick when a meeting at school informs Frankie and Mike that he has been bullied.
54	6	"Bad Choices"	Lee Shallat Chemel	Jana Hunter & Mitch Hunter	October 19, 2011	3X6906	9.13
Frankie and Mike consider trading the burdens of home ownership for apartment living; Axl fakes sickness to get out of a test while trying to create a loophole that allows him to still attend an evening party; Sue and her ex-sort-of-boyfriend Brad put together a skit about the dangers of texting and drinking while driving; Brick quotes Shakespeare.
55	7	"Halloween II"	Elliot Hegarty	David S. Rosenthal	October 26, 2011	3X6907	10.16
When Sue wears an embarrassing costume to a Halloween party, she turns for advice to a stunned Mike, who realizes that his daughter is growing up. Meanwhile, Frankie takes Brick's social skills group trick-or-treating, and decides to prove a point to them after having several run-ins with rude people. Elsewhere, Axl and his friends devise a plan to cash-in on trick-or-treating, but are sidetracked when they attempt to help two children regain their stolen treats.
56	8	"Heck's Best Thing"	Lee Shallat Chemel	Vijal Patel	November 2, 2011	3X6908	9.41
Frankie and Mike worry that Axl will jeopardize his chances of winning a college athletic scholarship. When he becomes the perfect gentleman for the recruiter's visit but goes back to normal upon his departure, Mike and Frankie realize they only bring out their best behavior for other people and not their family. Meanwhile, Sue and Brick text with a phone belonging to Aunt Edie.
57	9	"The Play"	Eyal Gordin	Story by : Roy Brown & Jana Hunter & Mitch Hunter; Teleplay by : Roy Brown	November 16, 2011	3X6909	9.19
Frankie and Sue are cast in a community production of The Wizard of Oz but their excitement derails when the director asks Frankie to tell Sue she is out because of her "crazy eyes." After a mother-daughter conversation, Sue believes that they both will be leaving the play, forcing Frankie to sneak out of the house to rehearsals. Meanwhile, Brick asks his Uncle Rusty (Norm Macdonald) to attend "Special Friends Day" at school, but a no-show from his uncle leads to lunch, bowling, and a driving lesson, and Mike is angry when he finds out. Also, Axl is grounded from playing video games for driving blindfolded on a dare from his buddies and spends his time flicking pennies.
58	10	"Thanksgiving III"	Elliot Hegarty	Tim Hobert	November 23, 2011	3X6910	9.08
Frankie's parents invite the Hecks to spend Thanksgiving at their house. The festivities begin to fall apart quickly when Frankie's sister Janet (Molly Shannon) and her family also show up. Meanwhile, Mike tries to offer some advice to Axl on how to pick up girls. Elsewhere, Brick attempts to prove his innocence when he is accused of damaging his cousin's expensive toy, and an excited Sue joins Frankie, Pat, and Janet in their gossip sessions.
59	11	"A Christmas Gift"	Blake Evans	Jana Hunter & Mitch Hunter	December 7, 2011	3X6911	8.72
While Mike tries to keep his Christmas gift of a new dishwasher a secret from Frankie, his wife plans a Christmas Eve party and wants him to install a new dishwasher prior to the festivities. Meanwhile, Sue asks Reverend TimTom to explain the deeper meaning of Christmas to Brick, who questions the holiday after reading the Bible. Elsewhere, Bob's attempts to act cool annoy Axl while they work together on a Christmas tree lot.
60	12	"Year of the Hecks"	Elliot Hegarty	David S. Rosenthal	January 4, 2012	3X6912	9.99
Frankie has the family randomly assign New Year's resolutions to each other. Ultimately, Frankie must spend more time with Brick, Mike must smile more often, Sue must give up trying out for things she will never make, Axl must keep his room clean, and Brick must stop reading all of the time. With an all-you-can-eat buffet as an incentive for those who can keep their resolutions for a week, the family tries to live up to one another's expectations. They find it more difficult than they imagined when Frankie leaves Brick at work after-hours, Axl overreaches to receive a revised grade of "A" on a paper he submitted long ago, Mike learns that smiling has its advantages and disadvantages, Brick suffers reading-withdrawal, and an ambitious Sue tries to form a band of girls to cheer on the wrestling team when her ex-boyfriend Brad joins.
61	13	"The Map"	Lee Shallat Chemel	DeAnn Heline & Eileen Heisler	January 11, 2012	3X6913	9.45
After Aunt Ginny's funeral, Frankie realizes the need to celebrate more milestones in her family's lives. Elsewhere, Axl eats Brick's school project (causing the usual chaos), and a delighted Sue discovers that a boy at school likes her.
62	14	"Hecking It Up"	Blake T. Evans	Vijal Patel	January 18, 2012	3X6914	8.08
Frankie is disappointed with her volunteer assignment at the Indiana-hosted Super Bowl. Meanwhile, with the Donahues away, the Hecks use the Donahues' new car for their personal errands. Elsewhere, Sue seizes the opportunity to tell her boyfriend how she feels about him.
63	15	"Valentine's Day III"	Lee Shallat Chemel	Jana Hunter & Mitch Hunter	February 8, 2012	3X6915	8.44
Frankie decides to spend Valentine's Day with her friends and their spouses at a fancy restaurant. At dinner, all of the husbands except Mike buy roses for their wives, angering Frankie. Meanwhile, Brick is assigned to write a paper on love and decides to write about Frankie and Mike's love. Axl has also been tasked with a school assignment about a life-changing event, but thinks nothing special has happened to him that would compare with his friends' stories. Elsewhere, Sue thinks her boyfriend has suddenly turned into a bad kisser, after experiencing French kissing for the first time.
64	16	"The Concert"	Phil Traill	Roy Brown	February 15, 2012	3X6916	8.04
Justin Bieber is coming to Indianapolis and Sue is desperate for tickets. Frankie decides to buy her tickets, but online tickets quickly sell out. When Sue learns more tickets are being sold in Indianapolis, Frankie takes her there, where line-jumpers get ahead of them. When Sue gets two tickets, Frankie assumes she will be attending the concert with her little girl however, Sue decides to go with her friend Carly. Elsewhere, Mike trains Brick for the annual school spelling bee, and Axl and his friends attempt to break a speed limit of 15 miles per hour on foot.
65	17	"The Sit Down"	Lee Shallat Chemel	Tim Hobert	February 22, 2012	3X6917	7.48
Axl, Sue and Brick feel that Frankie nags them too much and Mike makes crazy punishments. Frankie and Mike decide to sit the kids down, but the kids beat them to it and sit Mike and Frankie down instead. The kids want a chance to show their parents that they can be responsible, which turns out to be harder than they thought. While Mike and Frankie are out, Axl drives Sue around town to find her lost coat. From the back seat, Brick reads Of Mice and Men aloud so that Axl can write a book report. Frankie and Mike eagerly spend this spare time together.
66	18	"Leap Year"	Alex Hardcastle	David S. Rosenthal	February 29, 2012	3X6918	8.23
Despite Frankie's claims to the contrary, Sue thinks her parents are planning a big surprise party because she will be able to celebrate her birthday on her actual birth date, February 29. Meanwhile, Frankie learns that Mike has been taking care of a stray cat at his workplace, and when it dies she tries to make Mike talk about his feelings. Brick develops a crush on a girl in his social skills group who likes to bite things. When the school decides to cut the group, Brick takes action. When Axl becomes bored, he spends time vacuuming and becomes obsessed with it.
67	19	"The Paper Route"	Lee Shallat Chemel	Jack Burditt	March 14, 2012	3X6919	6.93
Brick takes a job delivering newspapers from the town's newsman (Edward Asner) to save up to buy night-vision goggles. Unfortunately, Frankie and Mike end up doing the job for him after Brick ends up missing a whole day of school. Meanwhile, Axl tries to convince Sue that a long-distance relationship with Matt will not work; and Frankie discovers that Mike has been hoarding batteries. Elsewhere, Axl tries out for the baseball team, and Sue has to adjust to wearing embarrassing headgear.
68	20	"Get Your Business Done"	Blake T. Evans	Vijal Patel	April 11, 2012	3X6920	7.06
After attending a new church, Frankie is inspired by a pastor who wants people to live without regrets by fulfilling their own destinies, and goes crazy trying to find her "business". Meanwhile, Brick wants a new bed, so Axl gets a game table and gets crushed by Brick at Air Hockey. Sue starts a babysitting service, but she ends up watching an awful boy her own age.
69	21	"The Guidance Counselor"	Lee Shallat Chemel	Jana Hunter & Mitch Hunter	May 2, 2012	3X6921	6.63
Sue forms a connection with her awkward guidance counselor (Whoopi Goldberg) when she goes to talk to her about how "invisible" and overlooked she is at school. Frankie is frustrated when Mike insists on assembling their new bed by himself. Meanwhile, Brick tries to relay a complaint to the president about the Presidential Fitness Test.
70	22	"The Clover"	Phil Traill	Roy Brown	May 9, 2012	3X6922	6.60
Brick believes that a four-leaf clover he found is bringing bad luck. Mike and his dad, "Big Mike," disagree over how Brick is being raised. Elsewhere, Axl is shocked when his jock friend Darrin asks "sunny-dispositioned" Sue to the prom. Then, stuck with "accidental" prom date Weird Ashley for a second year, he schemes to have another friend date the girl he wanted to take, just to keep her away from other guys, but Weird Ashley dumps him for a date she considers more her type. Meanwhile, Aunt Edie almost sets her house on fire and Frankie must find her a caregiver.
71	23	"The Telling"	Lee Shallat Chemel	Tim Hobert	May 16, 2012	3X6923	6.53
Frankie has eyes in the back of her head when she busts both Sue and Axl for making bad choices that they thought nobody would ever find out about. But when it turns out that she is using Brick as her snitch, Mike is completely against it. Meanwhile, Axl's weekend getaway to the lake is in peril when Sue discovers him sneaking into the house in the middle of the night and coerces him into doing whatever she commands so she will not tattle on him; and when Frankie is stuck at work, Mike is forced to attend Parent's Day at Brick's school.
72	24	"The Wedding"	Phil Traill	Vijal Patel	May 23, 2012	3X6924	6.52
The Hecks are pleased to learn that Mike's brother Rusty is getting married. But they discover that the wedding will be at their house in less than a week. Frankie goes out of her way to get everything done on the short notice, including decorating the house. Meanwhile, the wedding will keep Brick from attending a friend's party; and Axl and his friends start their own summer business and their first task is to remove a stump.

== Ratings ==
No.	Title	Air date	Rating/Share (18–49)	Viewers (million)	Reference
1	"Forced Family Fun Part 1"	September 21, 2011	3.1/9	9.74	
2	"Forced Family Fun Part 2"	September 21, 2011	3.1/9	9.74	
3	"Hecking Order"	September 28, 2011	2.7/8	8.68	
4	"Major Changes"	October 5, 2011	2.8/9	9.13	
5	"The Test"	October 12, 2011	2.9/9	8.87	
6	"Bad Choices"	October 19, 2011	3.0/9	9.13	
7	"Halloween II"	October 26, 2011	3.2/10	10.16	
8	"Heck's Best Thing"	November 2, 2011	3.0/9	9.41	
9	"The Play"	November 16, 2011	3.0/9	9.19	
10	"Thanksgiving III"	November 23, 2011	2.5/8	9.08	
11	"A Christmas Gift"	December 7, 2011	2.8/8	8.72	
12	"Year of the Hecks"	January 4, 2012	3.0/9	9.99	
13	"The Map"	January 11, 2012	2.9/8	9.45	
14	"Hecking It Up"	January 18, 2012	2.5/7	8.08	
15	"Valentine's Day III"	February 8, 2012	2.6/8	8.44	
16	"The Concert"	February 15, 2012	2.4/7	8.04	
17	"The Sit Down"	February 22, 2012	2.2/7	7.48	
18	"Leap Year"	February 29, 2012	2.6/7	8.23	
19	"The Paper Route"	March 14, 2012	2.1/7	6.93	
20	"Get Your Business Done"	April 11, 2012	2.1/7	7.06	
21	"The Guidance Counselor"	May 2, 2012	2.0/7	6.63	
22	"The Clover"	May 9, 2012	1.9/6	6.60	
23	"The Telling"	May 16, 2012	1.9/6	6.53	
24	"The Wedding"	May 23, 2012	2.0/7	6.52	
