= Tanner Maguire =

American actor (born 1998)

- Born: Tanner James Maguire; July 15, 1998 (age 27); Scottsdale, Arizona, U.S.
- Occupation: Child actor
- Years active: 2005–2012

Tanner James Maguire (born July 15, 1998) is an American former child actor, whose last film work was released when he was 14 years old. He appears in the film Janie. He is most famous for his roles in Letters to God and, earlier, in Saving Sarah Cain, in which he plays Josiah Cottrell. His sister, Payton Maguire, also acts.

== Career ==
Born in Scottsdale, Arizona, Tanner's interest in acting began at the age of three after a visit to the local community theater to see Peter Pan. By the time he was six, he had gone on to perform in nine different productions on stage. Tanner began to express interest in not only being in front of an audience but also being in front of a camera. His family relocated to Los Angeles and immediately Tanner began to work in television appearing on numerous popular shows, proving the move successful. Maguire has appeared in several national commercials.

Tanner donated an autographed bandanna from the movie Letters to God to Brendan Hogan, a young boy with brain cancer.

== Filmography ==
Year	Title	Role	Notes
2005	Medium	Jamie	Episode: "Sweet Dreams"
2005	My Name Is Earl	Young Ralph Mariano	Episode: "Teacher Earl"
2005	Midnight Clear	Little Boy	Short film
2005–2006	Janie	Ben	Short film
2005–2006	Desperate Housewives	Young Zach Young	4 episodes
2007	Hannah Montana	Jeffrey	Episode: "Achey Jakey Heart: Part 1"
2007	Saving Sarah Cain	Josiah Cottrell	TV movie
2007	Days of Our Lives	Young Shawn Brady	11 episodes
2007–2009	How I Met Your Mother	Young Barney Stinson	3 episodes
2008	Ghost Whisperer	Owen "Kenny" Grace	Episode: "Imaginary Friends and Enemies"
2009	Without a Trace	Young John Burroughs	Episode: "Chameleon"
2009	Eleventh Hour	Darren	Episode: "Subway"
2009	Lost	Young Tom Brennan	Episode: "The Incident"
2009	House	Jack Randall	Episode: "Instant Karma"
2010	Letters to God	Tyler Doherty	
2010	Brothers & Sisters	Henry	Episode: "The Science Fair"
2010	Breathe	Teus' alter ego	Short film
2010	CSI: NY	Boy	Episode "Unfriendly Chat"
2011	The Hangover Part II	Young Phil Wenneck	
2012	The Drew Peterson Story	Zach	

== Awards and nominations ==
Award	Year	Category	Result	Role
MovieGuide Awards	2011	Most Inspirational Television Acting	Nominated	Tyler Doherty in Letters to God
