= Bleed (Malcolm Todd song) =

Single by Malcolm Todd featuring Omar Apollo

from the album Malcolm Todd
- Released: February 28, 2025
- Genre: Alternative rock; R&B; indie pop
- Length: 3:00
- Label: Columbia Records; Sony Music; Malcolm Todd
- Songwriters: Malcolm Hobert; Omar Apollo; Jonah Cochran; Charlie Ziman
- Composers: Malcolm Todd; Apollo; Cochran; Ziman

Malcolm Todd singles chronology
"Chest Pain (I Love)" (2024)	"Bleed" (2025)	"Cheer Me On" (2025)

Omar Apollo singles chronology
"Hecho Para Ti" (2025)	"Bleed" (2025)	"Living Alone" (2026)

"Bleed" is a song by American singer-songwriter Malcolm Todd featuring Omar Apollo, released independently through exclusive licensing by Columbia Records and Sony Music on February 28, 2025, as the second single from the former's debut studio album Malcolm Todd (2025).

The official music video, released concurrently with the song, features Todd being kidnapped and being forced to compete in an underground fight club.

== Background and release ==
Malcolm Todd first met Omar Apollo while opening for him during Apollo's God Said No World Tour. This led to the two developing a close friendship, resulting in the former bringing Apollo in the early stage's of "Bleed"'s development. On the origins of the song, Todd stated, "[it] started with the idea of making a song purely to dance to. I had never really tried to do that before. It was sort of a joke at first. The more we worked on the song the more the idea made sense. It just got better and better. Now it's one of my favorite songs on my upcoming album."

"Bleed" was released independently on February 28, 2025, through exclusive licensing by Columbia Records and Sony Music, as the second single from Todd's eponymous debut studio album (2025).

== Composition ==
"Bleed" explores the upsides and downsides of love and heartbreak.

== Critical reception ==
Writing for Atwood Magazine, Miranda Urbanczyk praised "Bleed", stating it "mark[ed] the beginning of a new era of alternative rock and R&B hits" for Todd. Urbanczyk praised how the lyrics "build throughout the song, emphasizing the concept of control." Jake Selvey of Ones to Watch dubbed Todd's two-year career arc "nothing short of miraculous", pointing to "Bleed" as definitive evidence that he "is not just here to stay. He's merely just beginning."

== Commercial performance ==
"Bleed" debuted at number 20 on Billboard's Hot Rock & Alternative Songs on the chart dated March 15, 2025. In New Zealand, the song peaked at number 6 on the New Zealand Hot Singles Chart on the release dated March 7, 2025, remaining on the chart for one week.

== Music video ==
On February 28, 2025, Todd released the song's official music video, featuring a cameo from American rapper and singer Jack Harlow. Todd is depicted hanging out with the wrong people, which leads to him being beaten up. He is then kidnapped and forced to compete at an underground fight club, where Apollo appears. Jake Selvey of Ones to Watch stated that the accompanying music video was "the cherry on top [of the song]", praising the video's 70s vibe and motifs, and likening the fight scenes to that of Tyler Durden in Fight Club (1999).

== Credits and personnel ==
- Malcolm Hobert – vocals, writing, production

=== Other musicians ===
- Omar Apollo – vocals, writing, production
- Jonah Cochran – writing, production
- Charlie Ziman – writing, production

== Charts ==
Chart performance for "Bleed"
Chart (2026)	Peak position
New Zealand Hot Singles (RMNZ)	6
US Hot Rock & Alternative Songs (Billboard)	20

== Release history ==
Release history and formats for "Bleed"
Region	Date	Format(s)	Edition	Label	Ref.
Various	February 28, 2025	Digital download; streaming	Original	Columbia; Sony; Malcolm Todd	
