= Sweet Boy (song) =

Single by Malcolm Todd

from the album Sweet Boy
- Released: May 17, 2023
- Length: 3:00
- Label: Columbia
- Songwriter: Malcolm Hobart
- Producers: Malcolm Todd; Charlie Ziman

Malcolm Todd singles chronology
| "Art House" (2023) | "Sweet Boy" (2023) | "Roommates" (2023) |

Music video
- "Sweet Boy" on YouTube

"Sweet Boy" is a song by American singer-songwriter Malcolm Todd, released on May 17, 2023, as the lead single from his debut mixtape of the same name (2024). It was written and produced by Todd alongside Charlie Ziman.

== Composition ==
The song contains acoustic guitar. It lyrically depicts a complicated relationship, as Malcolm Todd yearns to stay with his love interest but realizes that he must let go. He reflects on the outcome of their relationship, in a bittersweet mood.

== Critical reception ==
Alessandra Rincon of Ones to Watch gave a positive review of the song, writing "The irresistible melodies and infectious acoustic guitar loops produce a delightful listening experience alongside his relaxed delivery, which exudes a contagious energy that can make anyone want to dance."

== Charts ==
Chart performance for "Sweet Boy"
| Chart (2026) | Peak position |
|---|---|
| Canada Hot 100 (Billboard) | 88 |
| US Billboard Hot 100 | 99 |
| US Hot Rock & Alternative Songs (Billboard) | 18 |

== Certifications ==
Certifications for "Sweet Boy"
| Region | Certification | Certified units/sales |
|---|---|---|
| United States (RIAA) | Gold | 500,000^{‡} |
| New Zealand (RMNZ) | Gold | 15,000^{‡} |
^{‡} Sales+streaming figures based on certification alone.
