= The Middle season 4 =

The Middle
- Season 4
- Region 1 DVD cover art
- Starring: Patricia Heaton; Neil Flynn; Charlie McDermott; Eden Sher; Atticus Shaffer
- No. of episodes: 24

Release
- Original network: ABC
- Original release: September 26, 2012 – May 22, 2013

Season chronology
- ← Previous; Season 3 Next → Season 5

The fourth season of the television comedy series The Middle began airing on September 26, 2012, on ABC in the United States. It is produced by Blackie and Blondie Productions and Warner Bros. Television with series creators DeAnn Heline and Eileen Heisler as executive producers.

The show features Frances "Frankie" Heck (Patricia Heaton), a working-class, Midwestern woman married to Mike Heck (Neil Flynn) who resides in the small fictional town of Orson, Indiana. They are the parents of three children, Axl (Charlie McDermott), Sue (Eden Sher), and Brick (Atticus Shaffer).

== Cast ==
=== Main cast ===
- Patricia Heaton as Frankie Heck
- Neil Flynn as Mike Heck
- Charlie McDermott as Axl Heck
- Eden Sher as Sue Heck
- Atticus Shaffer as Brick Heck

=== Recurring cast ===
- Chris Kattan as Bob, Frankie's best friend at the car dealership.

The 2nd Act.

- Jack McBrayer as Dr. Ted Goodwin, Frankie's over friendly boss who is oblivious to sarcasm He appears in the following episodes.

Dollar Days & The Ditch.

- Brian Doyle-Murray as Don Ehlert, Frankie's boss who fires her in early Season 4 due to her being hired last. He only appears in the 1 episode.

The 2nd Act.

- Brock Ciarlelli as Brad, Sue's ex-boyfriend. He appears in the following episodes.

The 2nd Act, The Hose, Thanksgiving IV, The Friend, The Smile, Wheel of Pain, Hallelujah Hoedown & The Ditch.

- Jen Ray as Nancy Donahue, Frankie's neighbor and friend. She appears in the following episodes.

Halloween III: The Driving, 20 Years & Valentine's Day IV.

- Blaine Saunders as Carly, Sue's best friend. She appears in the following episodes.

The 2nd Act, The Hose, Winner & Losers, Wheel of Pain, From Orson with Love & Hallelujah Hoedown.

- Galadriel Stineman as Cassidy Finch, Axl's girlfriend. She appears in the following episodes.

The Safe, Thanksgiving IV, 1 Kid at a Time, The Friend, The Name, The Bachelor, Hallelujah Hoedown & The Graduation.

- French Stewart as Principal Cameron. He appears in the following episodes.

Life Skills, The Friend & The Graduation

- Beau Wirick as Seán, Axl's friend. He appears in the following episodes.

Bunny Therapy, The Smile, Valentine's Day IV, Winners & Losers, The Bachelor, Dollar Days, Hallelujah Hoedown & The Graduation.

=== Guest cast ===
- Bailey Buntain as Jenna Taylor, Sue's school new freshman. She appears in "The Second Act" and "From Orson with Love".
- Dave Foley as Dr. Chuck Fulton, Brick's school therapist. He appears in "Bunny Therapy" "Life Skills" and "The Ditch".
- Brooke Shields as Rita Glossner, the Hecks' uncouth and troubled neighbor. She appears in "The Hose".
- Jane Kaczmarek as Mrs. Sandy Armwood, Frankie's dental teacher. She appears in "The Safe" and "Wheel of Pain".
- Marsha Mason as Pat Spence, Frankie's mother. She appears in "Thanksgiving IV" and "Dollar Days".
- Jerry Van Dyke as Tag Spence, Frankie's father. He appears in "Thanksgiving IV" and "From Orson with Love".
- Casey Sander as Jack Tracy, a football scout who interviews Axl. He appears in "Thanksgiving IV".
- Norm Macdonald as Rusty Heck, Mike's brother. He appears in "Christmas Help".
- John Cullum as Big Mike, Mike's father. He appears in "Twenty Years".
- David Koechner as Jeff Webber, Frankie and Mike's new neighbor. He appears in "The Friend".
- Gabrielle Carteris as Colleen Webber, Frankie and Mike's new neighbor. She appears in "The Friend".
- Roger Rees as Mr. Glover, Sue's teacher. He appears in "The Smile".
- Molly Shannon as Janet, Frankie's sister. She appears in "The Name".
- Ryan Rottman as Cliff, Cassidy's Ex-Boyfriend. He appears in "The Name".
- Marion Ross as Mrs. Dunlap, Brick's school vice principal. She appears in "The Graduation".

== Episodes ==
| No. overall | No. in season | Title | Directed by | Written by | Original release date | Prod. code | U.S. viewers (millions) |
|---|---|---|---|---|---|---|---|
| 73 | 1 | "Last Whiff of Summer" | Lee Shallat Chemel | Eileen Heisler & DeAnn Heline | September 26, 2012 | 3X7451 | 9.16 |
| 74 | 2 | "Last Whiff of Summer" | Lee Shallat Chemel | Eileen Heisler & DeAnn Heline | September 26, 2012 | 3X7452 | 9.16 |
Frankie's plans to recreate the magic of her own childhood summers are foiled when Mike lets it slip that Axl is his favorite Heck child, and Frankie tries to coax the kids into telling them who their favorite parent is. Meanwhile, when Frankie and Mike discover that Axl failed English during the past school year, they force him to make it up in summer school, otherwise he could jeopardize any chance of getting a college sports scholarship after graduation; Brick takes up growing a tomato for his summer project; and Sue tries to bond with a reluctant Mike and to get him involved in different activities with her — which she plans to document in a giant scrapbook.
| 75 | 3 | "The Second Act" | Blake T. Evans | Tim Hobert | October 3, 2012 | 3X7453 | 7.72 |
When Frankie is fired from Ehlert Motors, she enrolls in tech school to secure a real career. Meanwhile, school has begun and Axl is starting his Senior year in high school, Sophomore Sue takes on the task of mentoring new freshman Jenna Taylor (Bailey Buntain). Mike is upset with Brick when he cannot be bothered to put his book down to meet some of Mike's friends after a softball game.
| 76 | 4 | "Bunny Therapy" | Elliot Hegarty | Jana Hunter & Mitch Hunter | October 10, 2012 | 3X7454 | 7.90 |
When Brick develops yet another quirky habit that begins to overshadow his whispering, Frankie and Mike are urged by the school therapist, Dr. Fulton (Dave Foley), to get him a small pet so that he can learn to bond with it, which in turn will help him bond with people. But when they present Brick with an ill-tempered bunny, the tiny animal teaches the Heck family the true meaning of evil. Meanwhile, as the Homecoming dance approaches, Axl finds himself dating cheerleaders Courtney and Debbie — but he doesn't know which one of them is actually his girlfriend — and Sue tries out for school mascot.
| 77 | 5 | "The Hose" | Lee Shallat Chemel | Stacey Pulwer | October 17, 2012 | 3X7455 | 8.39 |
Trashy neighbor Rita Glossner (Brooke Shields) returns and is about to rain fire upon the Heck household when she accuses Frankie of stealing her garden hose. Meanwhile, Sue takes a peek at Mike's paycheck and is so shocked at how little he makes that she decides to call off her first official road trip to Cincinnati for her school mascot duties in order to save money; and while Brick learns about the birds and bees in school, Axl shocks his little brother by explaining the whole process in graphic detail.
| 78 | 6 | "Halloween III: The Driving" | Phil Traill | Roy Brown | October 24, 2012 | 3X7456 | 8.80 |
As Halloween approaches, the Hecks get quite the scare when Sue receives her learner's permit, and it is time for Frankie and Mike to teach her how to drive. But when a freaked-out Sue loses her nerve, she ends up running over Axl's foot, which could put an end to his high school football career and his hopes for a scholarship. Meanwhile Axl looks forward to voting in his first election, and Brick undergoes an unexpected transformation when he eats too much Halloween candy.
| 79 | 7 | "The Safe" | Lee Shallat Chemel | Robin Shorr | November 7, 2012 | 3X7457 | 9.04 |
Sue and Brick buy a safe at a pawn shop (run by Rick Harrison) hoping to strike it rich, but they have trouble getting it open. Axl continues to hobble around with his broken foot, but gets a smart girl named Cassidy to tutor him for US History class. Frankie starts classes to learn dental assisting. Unfortunately, she finds that the rest of the people in the class are more prepared than she is.
| 80 | 8 | "Thanksgiving IV" | Blake T. Evans | Tim Hobert | November 14, 2012 | 3X7459 | 8.79 |
Wanting to one-up Nancy Donahue, Frankie invites two Marines to Thanksgiving dinner. Unfortunately, her visiting parents turn the holiday into a chaotic celebration with their bickering. Meanwhile, as his feelings for his tutor intensify, Axl learns his foot is healed and he can play in the big game. Elsewhere, Sue tries to track down the thieves who stole the head for her hen mascot costume, and Brick becomes obsessed about a book written on the movie Love Story.
| 81 | 9 | "Christmas Help" | Phil Traill | Jana Hunter & Mitch Hunter | December 5, 2012 | 3X7460 | 7.98 |
Mike helps his brother, Rusty (Norm Macdonald), move some furniture into the Heck family's garage, only to realize that Rusty had stolen the furniture. Meanwhile, Frankie hopes to land a part-time job in a department store so she can get a discount on Christmas presents, but finds getting the right items harder than she thought. Elsewhere, Brick lands a part in Reverend Tim-Tom's (Paul Hipp) Christmas play at church, and Sue is tasked with baking cookies for said play.
| 82 | 10 | "Twenty Years" | Phil Traill | David S. Rosenthal | December 12, 2012 | 3X7458 | 7.29 |
As their 20th wedding anniversary approaches, Frankie begins to think that Mike may be tiring of her company and is purposely trying to avoid her. Meanwhile, Sue frantically tries to coax Axl and Brick into helping her set up an anniversary party for their parents. Unfortunately, things do not go as planned as Brick falls into a non-responsive state when Axl tells him the ending of the final book in a series that Brick has been reading for years.
| 83 | 11 | "Life Skills" | Lee Shallat Chemel | Roy Brown | January 9, 2013 | 3X7461 | 8.39 |
Axl and Sue discover they are in the same life skills class. When Axl discovers that he and Sue have been partnered to do a project, he finds excuses not to do it until the night before, and after accidentally leaving their project at home on presentation day, Axl makes a quick dash around the school for people to do the project for him (which turns out to be an Italian restaurant). Meanwhile, Brick's school therapist Dr. Fulton (Dave Foley) tries to help him make friends, and Dr. Fulton watches Brick throughout the day at school, but the two become close friends. A tree fell down on Mike and Frankie's car, and they are miserable with it. Mike and Frankie go to the Insurance Company to get it fixed, but their claim is declined on a technicality.
| 84 | 12 | "One Kid at a Time" | Elliot Hegarty | David S. Rosenthal | January 16, 2013 | 3X7462 | 8.21 |
When it comes to having more than one child, there is a chance that they will fight for their parents' attention. When Frankie and Mike dedicate a day to each of their children, Axl takes them to a paintball range, Sue has them do 17 separate activities, and Brick wants to go to a sci-fi convention.
| 85 | 13 | "The Friend" | Lee Shallat Chemel | Robin Shorr | January 23, 2013 | 3X7463 | 8.55 |
Frankie tries to get Mike to spend time with a new neighbor who shares his interests. Meanwhile, when the cheerleaders told the school that they will be cheering for the wrestling team, Sue and the Wrestlerettes demand a cheer-off. Axl asks Brick to teach him culture so he can converse with Cassidy.
| 86 | 14 | "The Smile" | Elliot Hegarty | Tim Hobert | February 6, 2013 | 3X7464 | 8.21 |
While other kids begin receiving college acceptance letters and Axl still hasn't, Frankie and Mike begin to worry that their son's chances for a sports scholarship have passed him by. Axl also feels the pressure when he discovers his two best friends, Sean and Darrin, already got into their top choices (Sean was accepted into Notre Dame, and Darrin was accepted into air-conditioning repair school). Meanwhile, Sue is determined to prove that smiling is contagious as a hypothesis for a school science project, and a relentless Brick begins pestering his parents for an iPad.
| 87 | 15 | "Valentine's Day IV" | Phil Traill | Jana Hunter & Mitch Hunter | February 13, 2013 | 3X7465 | 7.72 |
As Valentine's Day approaches, Axl, Sean and Darrin help guys break up with their girlfriends. Brick becomes upset with Frankie when he discovers that she has thrown out all of the school artwork he made over the years. Meanwhile, Sue becomes ecstatic when her ex-boyfriend Matt asks her to the school's Valentine's Day dance. Elsewhere, Mike finds himself in trouble at work when he accidentally sends a romantic text to one of his co-workers instead of to Frankie.
| 88 | 16 | "Winners and Losers" | John Putch | David S. Rosenthal | February 20, 2013 | 3X7466 | 8.27 |
Frankie is worried when Brick decides to go on a three-day school trip to the big city of Chicago. But it's also one of Frankie's favorite times of the year: The Oscars on TV, causing her to forget to meet Brick at school after his trip. Meanwhile, Sue wants to know if Axl's friend Darrin really has feelings for her. She prances around their living room, trying to draw his attention.
| 89 | 17 | "Wheel of Pain" | Lee Shallat Chemel | Michael Saltzman | February 27, 2013 | 3X7467 | 7.97 |
After accidentally breaking the family room window, Axl, Sue and Brick decide to band together and place the blame on the neighborhood bad seeds, the Glossner boys. But Frankie and Mike see through the lie when the kids' stories conflict, and plot to extract the truth. Meanwhile, Frankie needs to please her no-nonsense dental assisting school teacher, Mrs. Armwood (Jane Kaczmarek), in order to obtain a prime dental rotation spot. Also, Sue's 16th Birthday is coming up.
| 90 | 18 | "The Name" | Alex Hardcastle | Roy Brown | March 27, 2013 | 3X7468 | 6.90 |
Frankie's sister (Molly Shannon) offers to help at the house while Frankie studies for her finals for dental-assistant school. Meanwhile, Axl tries not to act jealous when Cassidy's ex-boyfriend visits. Also, Sue wants to change her middle name, which is also Sue.
| 91 | 19 | "The Bachelor" | Lee Shallat Chemel | Tim Hobert | April 3, 2013 | 3X7469 | 7.22 |
Disappointed with the finale of The Bachelor, Frankie mopes for days. Meanwhile, when Sue joins the school's tennis team, Mike encourages her not to compliment her opponents during matches. Elsewhere, Cassidy and Axl consider the future of their relationship, while Frankie finds an unlikely "Bachelor" conversationalist in Brick.
| 92 | 20 | "Dollar Days" | Phil Traill | Jana Hunter & Mitch Hunter | April 10, 2013 | 3X7470 | 7.55 |
Sue and Darrin become the "Yoko and John" of Axl's band, ending their relationship. Mike becomes an unwilling scout master for Brick's social skills group, and after graduating from dental school, Frankie finds a job as a dental assistant.
| 93 | 21 | "From Orson with Love" | Lee Shallat Chemel | Robin Shorr | May 1, 2013 | 3X7471 | 7.41 |
Frankie tries to make Sue appear more popular on Facebook, by creating her own fictitious profile and then posting many "like" compliments on Sue's page. Meanwhile Frankie's dad (Jerry Van Dyke) makes Mike listen to long-winded life stories. Elsewhere, Brick and Axl try to create a viral video starring kittens and bunnies.
| 94 | 22 | "Hallelujah Hoedown" | Blake T. Evans | David S. Rosenthal | May 8, 2013 | 3X7472 | 6.80 |
As Mother's Day approaches, Frankie wants to ensure that Mike gets her something she actually wants for a gift and informs all of the kids of her wish so that at least one of them will clue in a clueless Mike. Meanwhile, Sue asks Reverend TimTom for advice when she begins to resent her friends' happiness over getting their driver's licenses after she has repeatedly failed the test, and Cassidy stuns Axl with some bad news during the prom.
| 95 | 23 | "The Ditch" | Lee Shallat Chemel | Roy Brown | May 15, 2013 | 3X7473 | 6.76 |
Dressed in a lab coat for her dental assisting job, Frankie is mistaken for a doctor and receives special treatment while in a long line to pay a bill. The situation gets complicated later in the day, when Frankie recognizes a dental patient as one of the people she passed in line. Axl talks Sue into ditching school for the day, but the stress makes it one of the worst days of Sue's life. Mike and Axl's fishing trip goes awry. Brick is distraught over entering middle-school, so he refuses to take his placement test.
| 96 | 24 | "The Graduation" | Eileen Heisler | Tim Hobert | May 22, 2013 | 3X7474 | 7.70 |
In the season four finale, tension builds as Frankie tries to plan a graduation party for uncooperative Axl. Sue tries to get her driver's license for a sixth time. As class historian, a position that he forgot he had, Brick must assemble a slide show highlighting the past four years of school.

== Ratings ==
| No. | Title | Air date | Rating/Share (18–49) | Viewers (million) | Reference |
|---|---|---|---|---|---|
| 1 | "Last Whiff of Summer Part 1" | September 26, 2012 | 2.9/9 | 9.16 | |
| 2 | "Last Whiff of Summer Part 2" | September 26, 2012 | 2.9/9 | 9.16 | |
| 3 | "The Second Act" | October 3, 2012 | 2.2/7 | 7.72 | |
| 4 | "Bunny Therapy" | October 10, 2012 | 2.4/7 | 7.90 | |
| 5 | "The Hose" | October 17, 2012 | 2.5/8 | 8.39 | |
| 6 | "Halloween III: The Driving" | October 24, 2012 | 2.6/8 | 8.80 | |
| 7 | "The Safe" | November 7, 2012 | 2.7/8 | 9.04 | |
| 8 | "Thanksgiving IV" | November 14, 2012 | 2.6/8 | 8.79 | |
| 9 | "Christmas Help" | December 5, 2012 | 2.3/7 | 7.98 | |
| 10 | "Twenty Years" | December 12, 2012 | 2.1/7 | 7.29 | |
| 11 | "Life Skills" | January 9, 2013 | 2.4/7 | 8.39 | |
| 12 | "One Kid At A Time" | January 16, 2013 | 2.3/7 | 8.21 | |
| 13 | "The Friend" | January 23, 2013 | 2.5/7 | 8.55 | |
| 14 | "The Smile" | February 6, 2013 | 2.3/7 | 8.21 | |
| 15 | "Valentine's Day IV" | February 13, 2013 | 1.9/6 | 7.72 | |
| 16 | "Winners and Losers" | February 20, 2013 | 2.3/7 | 8.27 | |
| 17 | "Wheel of Pain" | February 27, 2013 | 2.1/6 | 7.97 | |
| 18 | "The Name" | March 27, 2013 | 1.8/6 | 6.90 | |
| 19 | "The Bachelor" | April 3, 2013 | 2.0/6 | 7.22 | |
| 20 | "Dollar Days" | April 10, 2013 | 2.0/6 | 7.55 | |
| 21 | "From Orson With Love" | May 1, 2013 | 2.0/7 | 7.41 | |
| 22 | "Hallelujah Hoedown" | May 8, 2013 | 1.8/6 | 6.80 | |
| 23 | "The Ditch" | May 15, 2013 | 1.9/7 | 6.76 | |
| 24 | "The Graduation" | May 22, 2013 | 2.0/7 | 7.70 | |
