= I Saw Your Face =

Single by Malcolm Todd

from the album Do That Again
- Written: November 2025
- Released: April 24, 2026
- Genre: Indie rock
- Length: 3:09
- Label: Columbia
- Songwriters: Malcolm Hobart; Matthew Castellanos; Jonah Cochran; Blake Slatkin
- Producers: Malcolm Todd; Castellanos; Cochran; Slatkin

Malcolm Todd singles chronology
"Earrings" (2026)	"I Saw Your Face" (2026)	"I Just Got Mad" (2026)

Music video
- "I Saw Your Face" on YouTube

"I Saw Your Face" is a song by American singer-songwriter Malcolm Todd, released on April 24, 2026, as the second single from his second studio album Do That Again (2026). It was written and produced by Todd alongside Matthew Castellanos, Jonah Cochran, and Blake Slatkin. The song was written in November 2025, with many attempts to change production.

The song is about struggling to communicate feelings while centering on pain from leaving a relationship. The song received mixed reviews from critics. It debuted on four charts, where it received number 78 on the Canadian Hot 100, number 27 on the Hot Rock & Alternative Songs chart, number 75 on the Billboard Hot 100, and number 6 on the New Zealand Hot Singles chart.

== Background ==
Written in November 2025, "I Saw Your Face" underwent an extensive production process before its completion. Malcolm Todd spent two months tweaking the production, before scrapping his attempts and rebuilding the post-breakup overture from scratch on the last day of sessions. He stated "I knew how good the song was. I was starting to lose hope. And then at the last second, we just made it happen." Todd claimed that because "Breathe" was released, he wanted to "lean on the other side of the spectrum" and write something more emotional.

== Production and composition ==
"I Saw Your Face" was written and produced by Todd, Matthew Castellanos, Jonah Cochran, and Blake Slatkin. In the song, Malcolm Todd centers on his emotional pain from leaving a relationship, despite knowing that it is failing, and struggling to communicate his feelings. The song is characterized by "Steve Lacy–inspired strumming." According to Ezra Kendrick of Melodic Magazine, the song "sits comfortably in the realm of indie rock", which contrasts from "Breathe", an R&B-influenced song. They also stated that the song features a "nostalgic, bittersweet tone" over "fun guitar layering".

== Critical reception ==
Steve Forstneger of Beats Per Minute stated that the song is the album's standout track. They praise Todd's vulnerability and directness in the song, with the line "Life's not a movie / I'm not a movie star" being described as "breathtaking." They also stated that the song "almost justifies cobbling an album around it." Kendrick criticized the song for its poor representation of the album and stated that it "doesn't stand out" in the album. Writing for Rolling Stone, Jon Dolan stated that the song had a "nice mix" between romance and self-awareness.

== Commercial performance ==
"I Saw Your Face" debuted on US and Canadian Billboard charts, as well as the New Zealand Hot Singles chart. The song reached number 78 on the Billboard Canadian Hot 100. In the United States, it charted on both the Billboard Hot 100, where it debuted at number 75, and the Hot Rock & Alternative Songs, where it debuted at number 27. It also reached number 6 on the New Zealand Hot Singles chart from Recorded Music NZ.

== Music video ==
The music video was released alongside the single. Directed by Malcolm Todd and Aidan Cullen, Todd wanted the theme of "I Saw Your Face" to be represented in the music video. He chose to lean into male vulnerability. In the music video, a scene features Todd standing off against a giant onion. In another scene, he is shown in the "Strong Boys Club," where he and other men around him cry.

== Personnel ==
Credits and personnel adapted from Tidal.

- Malcolm Hobert - producer, composer, lyricist, bassist, guitarist, vocalist
- Blake Slatkin - producer, composer, lyricist
- Jonah Cochran - producer, composer, lyricist, bassist, drummer, guitarist, programmer, recording engineer
- Matthew Castellanos - producer, composer, lyricist
- Ingmar Carlson - mixing engineer
- Ruairi O'Flaherty - mastering engineer
- Jon Castelli - mixing engineer
- Charlie Ziman - recording engineer
- Jackson Tracy - recording engineer

== Charts ==
Weekly chart performance for "I Saw Your Face"
Chart (2026)	Peak position
Canada (Canadian Hot 100)	78
New Zealand Hot Singles (RMNZ)	6
US Billboard Hot 100	75
US Hot Rock & Alternative Songs (Billboard)	27
