= Natanya =

British singer-songwriter (born 2002)

- Also known as: Feline
- Born: Natanya Morayo Popoola; 5 September 2002 (age 24); North London, England
- Education: University College London
- Genres: R&B; pop; jazz; soul; dance-pop
- Years active: 2019–present
- Label: Human Re Sources

Natanya Morayo Popoola (born 5 September 2002) is an English singer-songwriter from North London. She initially gained popularity in 2022 from her single "Foolish" and followed it the following year with an EP, Sorrow At Sunrise. Natanya ventured into dance-pop with the Feline's Return pair of EPs in 2025, and released her mixtape, Attitude Era!, in 2026.

== Early life ==
Natanya Morayo Popoola was born on 5 September 2002, in North West London, England. Her father, a third culture kid from Nigeria, played bongo drums in a church band and her mother, of Indo-Trinidadian descent, had wanted to become a singer. Born with perfect pitch, she began taking classical piano and violin lessons when she was four. Natanya was first inspired to create her own music when she was fourteen, after listening to Frank Ocean's then-newly-released Blonde on the way home from school. Natanya also attended the Julian Joseph Jazz Academy on the weekends and wrote her first songs there. In 2022, Natanya began studying English literature at University College London.

== Career ==
From 2019 to 2022, Natanya self-produced and released her own music, originally doing so just for fun. By 2023, she signed to Aura, an imprint of Moves Recordings, and released the single "Angel". The single preceded her debut project, the EP Sorrow At Sunrise, which released on 29 September. That year, Natanya also served as an opener for the girl group Flo. She released her second EP, Feline's Return, on 27 June 2025, through Human Re Sources. The project leaned into more of an upbeat, poppier sound and explored Natnaya's alter ego as an artist, Feline, which she described as having a "seductive, silent, cat-like manner". A sequel, Feline's Return Act II, was released on 10 October. Natanya released her mixtape, Attitude Era!, on 10 September 2026, and announced an accompanying headlining tour, The Attitude Tour. She was inspired by the WWE's Attitude Era and continued themes that she had established in the Feline's Return EPs, balancing upbeat pop with darker R&B.

== Influences and artistry ==
Natanya's music has been described as R&B, jazz, soul and both pop and dance-pop. She has stated that she has been influenced by Stevie Wonder, Michael Jackson, Tyler, the Creator, Amy Winehouse, Billie Holiday, Janet Jackson, and Whitney Houston. Her parents, from international backgrounds, primarily listened to American music, which had an effect on her. Natanya's music has been characterized by its use of camp, silky vocals and dense, lush production, being described by Pitchfork as a mix of PinkPantheress and Ravyn Lenae, both of whom she had opened for on their U.K tours. Her visual style as seen in her music videos and such was inspired by the directors Charlie Kaufman and Tim Burton, Victorian fashion, professional wrestling, and Old Hollywood pin-up models such as Bettie Page. Much of Natanya's early work, such as the single "Foolish", was self-produced and influenced by artists such as Erykah Badu and Mereba. Her debut EP, Sorrow At Sunrise, included influences from Kate Bush, Cocteau Twins, and Whitney Houston.

== Discography ==
=== Mixtapes ===
Title	Details
Attitude Era!	Released: 10 September 2026; Label: Human Re Sources; Formats: Digital download

=== Extended plays ===
Title	Details
Sorrow At Sunrise	Released: 29 September 2023; Label: Moves Recordings; Formats: Digital download
Feline's Return	Released: 13 June 2025; Label: Human Re Sources; Formats: Digital download
Feline's Return Act II	Released: 10 October 2025; Label: Human Re Sources; Formats: Digital download

=== Singles ===
Title	Year	Album
"Sunset Melody"	2019	Non-album singles
"Blue Jay"	2019	Non-album singles
"Like U"	2021	Non-album singles
"Foolish"	2022	Non-album singles
"Angel"	2023	Sorrow At Sunrise
"Raining Tomorrow"	2023	Sorrow At Sunrise
"boombox"	2024	Non-album singles
"Daydream"	2025	Feline's Return
"Dangerous"	2025	Feline's Return
"Jezebel"	2025	Feline's Return Act II
"Don't Ask!"	2026	Attitude Era!
"Candyland!"	2026	Attitude Era!
"Play With a Kiss!"	2026	Attitude Era!
