= Sweet Boy =

Mixtape by Malcolm Todd
- Released: April 5, 2024
- Genres: Pop; rock; R&B
- Length: 45:15
- Label: Columbia

Malcolm Todd chronology
| Shower Shoes (2023) | Sweet Boy (2024) | Malcolm Todd (2025) |

Singles from Sweet Boy
- 1. "Art House" Released: April 17, 2023; 2. "Sweet Boy" Released: May 17, 2023; 3. "Roommates" Released: June 22, 2023; 4. "Hot in NY" Released: August 25, 2023; 5. "Mr. Incorrect" Released: October 20, 2023; 6. "4Me 4Me" Released: January 26, 2024; 7. "New Friends" Released: February 23, 2024; 8. "Earrings" Released: April 14, 2026

Sweet Boy is the debut mixtape by American singer-songwriter Malcolm Todd. The first full-length project by Todd (with 16 tracks in total), the mixtape was released on April 5, 2024, through Columbia Records. The mixtape features a guest appearance from Eem Triplin, and gained more recognition in mid-2026 after the song "Earrings" went viral.

== Background and release ==
Sweet Boy was released on April 5, 2024. The mixtape has lovesick themes throughout it, such as missing an ex, troubled relationships, and young love being intense.

Prior to its release, Todd released two EPs, Sweet Boy Pt. 1 and Sweet Boy Pt. 2, later merging it into one cohesive mixtape. The first EP features "On My Shoulder", "Thailand", "Ladygirl", "4Me 4Me", and "Rodrick Rules". The second EP included "Accutane", "Sore Throat", "Rockstar Boyfriend", "New Friends" featuring Eem Triplin, and "Pillow". Todd also released some singles that didn't make the EPs but made the mixtape which includes: "Art House", "Sweet Boy", "Roommates", "Hot in NY", and "Mr. Incorrect".

The mixtape earned Todd success on TikTok, leading to his record deal with Columbia.

== Reception ==
Professional ratings
Review scores
| Source | Rating |
|---|---|
| AllMusic | 3/5 stars |

Marcy Donelson of AllMusic rated Sweet Boy a 3 out of 5, stating that the songs on the mixtape had strong responses from listeners, which helped Malcolm Todd get a record deal with Columbia. KXSC Radio described Sweet Boy as "a charming mixtape with enchanting guitar melodies and catchy chorus". Writing for The Music Mag, Laure Ketterl noted that "Ladygirl" has a similar rhythm to Steve Lacy's "Bad Habit".

== Track listing ==
| No. | Title | Length |
|---|---|---|
| 1. | "Earrings" | 2:31 |
| 2. | "Roommates" | 3:34 |
| 3. | "On My Shoulder" | 2:49 |
| 4. | "Thailand" | 3:55 |
| 5. | "Ladygirl" | 2:04 |
| 6. | "Sweet Boy" | 3:00 |
| 7. | "Rodrick Rules" | 3:03 |
| 8. | "4Me 4Me" | 3:30 |
| 9. | "Art House" | 2:57 |
| 10. | "Sore Throat" | 2:55 |
| 11. | "Rockstar Boyfriend" | 1:47 |
| 12. | "New Friends" (featuring Eem Triplin) | 2:10 |
| 13. | "Accutane" | 3:13 |
| 14. | "Hot in NY" | 1:58 |
| 15. | "Pillow" | 2:53 |
| 16. | "Mr. Incorrect" | 2:50 |
| Total length: | | 45:15 |

== Charts ==
Chart performance for Sweet Boy
| Chart (2026) | Peak position |
|---|---|
| Australian Albums (ARIA) | 27 |
| Canadian Albums (Billboard) | 35 |
| Dutch Albums (Album Top 100) | 64 |
| Lithuanian Albums (AGATA) | 35 |
| Norwegian Albums (IFPI Norge) | 37 |
| Portuguese Albums (AFP) | 171 |
| US Billboard 200 | 26 |
