= Malcolm Todd =

American musician (born 2003)

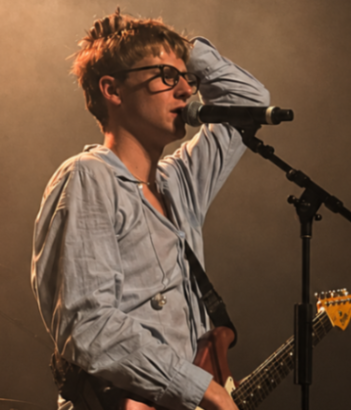
- Todd in 2026
- Born: Malcolm Todd Hobert; September 15, 2003 (age 23); Los Angeles, California, U.S.
- Occupations: Singer; songwriter; record producer; musician
- Years active: 2022–present
- Notable work: Discography
- Relatives: Audrey Hobert (sister)
- Musical career
- Genres: Indie pop; alternative R&B; bedroom pop; R&B
- Instruments: Vocals; bass guitar; guitar
- Label: Columbia
- Website: malcolmtodd.cool

Malcolm Todd Hobert (born September 15, 2003) is an American singer-songwriter and record producer. He signed with Columbia Records after he went viral on TikTok for his 2023 singles "Art House" and "Roommates"—both of which were included on his mixtape Sweet Boy (2024). His self-titled debut studio album (2025) peaked at number 49 on the Billboard 200 and spawned the single "Chest Pain (I Love)", which became his first entry on the Billboard Hot 100. In 2026, his 2024 track "Earrings" became a global sleeper hit, reaching the top 40 of the music charts in several countries, including the US (where it peaked at number 19 on the Billboard Hot 100), the UK, and Canada. That year, he also released his second studio album, Do That Again, which peaked at number five on the Billboard 200. Todd's music is noted for its blend of indie pop and alternative R&B.

== Early life ==
Malcolm Todd Hobert was born on September 15, 2003, in Los Angeles, California. His father, Tim Hobert, is a former television scriptwriter who worked as co-executive producer on the sitcom The Middle. As a child, Todd appeared as a baseball player in the sixth episode of the fourth season of the show. His mother, who participated in musical theater, introduced Todd to Broadway soundtracks and artists like Stevie Wonder, while his father introduced him to folk and rock artists such as the Grateful Dead and James Taylor. Todd's sister Audrey Hobert is also a singer-songwriter, having released her debut studio album Who's the Clown? in 2025.

Todd was raised in the Palisades neighborhood of Los Angeles and attended Palisades Charter High School. Todd received a bass guitar at age 16 and taught himself to play during the COVID-19 pandemic, eventually moving on to acoustic guitar. While attending high school, he began writing and producing music with his friend Charlie Ziman, resulting in his first EP, Demos Before Prom (2022). He also wrote sketch comedies and played bass in the pit ensemble for his high school's musical theatre productions. Following his graduation in 2022, Todd planned to attend the University of Oregon to study music production, but dropped out a week prior. To fund his early musical pursuits, he worked at a Cold Stone Creamery.

== Career ==
Todd first gained attention on TikTok when his songs "Art House" and "Roommates" went viral in 2023. He made his live debut in July 2023, in a sold-out show at Winston House in Venice, Los Angeles. In 2024, Todd released his debut mixtape Sweet Boy. Later that year, he served as an opening act for Omar Apollo on the North American leg of the God Said No World Tour.

Todd released his self-titled debut album, Malcolm Todd on April 4, 2025. The album's lead single "Chest Pain (I Love)" became his first entry on the Billboard Hot 100, peaking at number 68. It was also supported by the single "Bleed" featuring Apollo, with a music video that included cameo appearances from Jack Harlow and Harry Daniels. This was then followed by the third single "Cheer Me On". Upon release, the album debuted at number 103 on the Billboard 200, marking his first entry on the chart. In August 2025, he released a deluxe version Malcolm Todd (still) which was supported by the single "Original". Following the deluxe release, the album re-entered the Billboard 200 at a new peak of number 49. During this period, Todd also performed at several music festivals, including Camp Flog Gnaw Carnival and Laneway Festival.

Todd released his second studio album Do That Again on June 5, 2026. The album was preceded by two singles "Breathe" and "I Saw Your Face", released on March 13 and April 23, 2026, respectively. At the same time, his 2024 track "Earrings" experienced a resurgence as a global sleeper hit, reaching the top 40 of the music charts in the US.

== Influences and artistry ==
Todd's music is a blend of indie pop and R&B, drawing influences from the bedroom pop scene and 2010s alternative R&B. His music is inspired by bedroom pop artists like Steve Lacy, Omar Apollo, Dominic Fike, and Ryan Beatty. Todd has said that he enjoys using obscure chords in his music to make him unique.

== Discography ==
Studio albums

- Malcolm Todd (2025)
- Do That Again (2026)

Mixtapes

- Sweet Boy (2024)

== Tours ==
Headlining

- Sweet Boy Tour (2024)
- The Wholesome Rockstar Tour (2025)
- Do That Again World Tour (2026–2027)

Supporting

- God Said No World Tour (Omar Apollo) (2024)

== Awards and nominations ==
Award	Year	Nominee(s) / Work(s)	Category	Result	Ref.
BreakTudo Awards	2026	Himself	International Rising Artist	Pending	
MTV Video Music Awards	2026	Himself	Best New Artist	Nominated	
