= Roommates (Malcolm Todd song) =

2023 single by Malcolm Todd

Single by Malcolm Todd

from the album Sweet Boy
- Released: June 22, 2023
- Length: 3:34
- Label: Columbia
- Songwriter: Malcolm Hobart
- Producers: Malcolm Todd; Charlie Ziman

Malcolm Todd singles chronology
"Sweet Boy" (2023)	"Roommates" (2023)	"Hot in NY" (2023)

Music video
- "Roommates" on YouTube

"Roommates" is a song by American singer-songwriter Malcolm Todd, released on June 22, 2023, as the second single from his debut mixtape Sweet Boy (2024). The song was written and produced by Todd alongside Charlie Ziman.

Malcolm Todd has cited the song's line "I want to share an apartment, a room and a bed" as one of his favorite lyrics.

== Critical reception ==
Alessandra Rincon of Ones to Watch gave a positive review of the song, writing "The guitar melody and bass complement each other beautifully, creating a catchy and infectious rhythm that resonates in the listener's mind and soul long after the song ends. How Todd effortlessly blends elements of nostalgia with a contemporary sound is a testament to his innate songwriting prowess. His voice interweaves through the song effortlessly, carrying raw emotion and depth with each note."

== Charts ==
Chart performance for "Roommates"
Chart (2026)	Peak position
US Bubbling Under Hot 100 (Billboard)	1
US Hot Rock & Alternative Songs (Billboard)	20

== Certifications ==
Certifications for "Roommates"
Region	Certification	Certified units/sales
New Zealand (RMNZ)	Gold	15,000^{‡}
United States (RIAA)	Gold	500,000^{‡}
^{‡} Sales+streaming figures based on certification alone.
