= Earrings (song) =

2026 single by Malcolm Todd

Single by Malcolm Todd

from the album Sweet Boy
- Released: April 14, 2026
- Length: 2:31
- Label: Columbia
- Songwriters: Malcolm Hobert; Jonah Cochran
- Producers: Malcolm Todd; Cochran; Charlie Ziman

Malcolm Todd singles chronology
"Breathe" (2026)	"Earrings" (2026)	"I Saw Your Face" (2026)

"Earrings" is a song recorded by American singer-songwriter Malcolm Todd from his debut mixtape, Sweet Boy (2024). It was written by Todd and Jonah Cochran and produced by both of them and Charlie Ziman.

In 2026, two years after its release, the song resurged in popularity after going viral on TikTok, leading Columbia Records to release it as a single to US pop radio on April 14, 2026. In the United States, "Earrings" marked Todd's highest-charting entry on the Billboard Hot 100 to date, peaking at number 17. Outside the US, the song reached the top 10 of the music charts in Australia, New Zealand, and Singapore, and the top 20 in Ireland, Lebanon, Malaysia, the Philippines, Thailand, the United Arab Emirates, and the United Kingdom. It has been certified platinum in Australia, Canada New Zealand, and the United States.

== Background ==
Released in 2024, "Earrings" served as the opening track on singer-songwriter Malcolm Todd's major-label debut mixtape, Sweet Boy, following his signing with Columbia Records. Speaking about the song, Todd stated, "'Earrings' is the perfect intro to my heartbreak mixtape Sweet Boy. The song walks through my brain as I try to reach out to someone I've lost connection with." The song became a sleeper hit two years after release.

In July 2026, Spotify removed about 500,000 streams from the song after it topped the platorm's daily U.S. chart for the first time. The streams were removed after alleged betting fraud on Kalshi.

== Composition ==
The song consists of percussion, bass lines, "retro-infused" keys, and guitar riffs in the production, with lyrics focused on love. It leads to a "psychedelic collage of sound and fuzzed-out harmonies", before ending the song with the message "Okay, well, I hope you like my mixtape." As stated in The New York Times, the track has been made with a DIY feel and a relaxed pace, as the track employs nasal-sounding keyboards and guitars, sloppy drums, multitracked singing, which has similarities to the style of Steve Lacy from his 2022 single titled "Bad Habit."

== Critical reception ==
Alessandra Rincon of Ones to Watch praised the production, describing it as "stellar" and remarking that its elements "usher in Todd's bright and, for lack of a better word, sweet vocals".

== Other versions ==
In May 2026, Todd's sister Audrey Hobert (Todd uses his middle name as his surname professionally) covered "Earrings" during her debut appearance on Triple J's Like a Version.

== Charts ==
Chart performance for "Earrings"
Chart (2026)	Peak position
Australia (ARIA)	7
Australia Hip Hop/R&B (ARIA)	1
Canada (Canadian Hot 100)	16
Canada CHR/Top 40 (Billboard)	17
Canada Hot AC (Billboard)	31
Central America Anglo Airplay (Monitor Latino)	9
Colombia Anglo Airplay (Monitor Latino)	8
Costa Rica Anglo Airplay (Monitor Latino)	9
Czech Republic Singles Digital (ČNS IFPI)	89
Finland Airplay (Radiosoittolista)	98
France (SNEP)	183
Germany (GfK)	99
Global 200 (Billboard)	11
Greece International (IFPI)	63
India International (IMI)	10
Ireland (IRMA)	12
Israel International Airplay (Media Forest)	5
Italy Airplay (EarOne)	32
Latvia Streaming (LaIPA)	18
Lebanon (Lebanese Top 20)	11
Lithuania (AGATA)	22
Malaysia (Billboard)	11
Malaysia International (RIM)	10
Netherlands (Single Top 100)	46
New Zealand (Recorded Music NZ)	5
Norway (VG-lista)	31
Panama International (PRODUCE)	25
Philippines (IFPI)	17
Philippines Hot 100 (Billboard Philippines)	15
Portugal (AFP)	59
San Marino Airplay (SMRTV Top 50)	32
Singapore (RIAS)	4
Sweden (Sverigetopplistan)	38
Switzerland (Schweizer Hitparade)	39
Thailand (Billboard)	11
United Arab Emirates (IFPI)	16
UK Singles (Official Charts)	13
US Billboard Hot 100	17
US Adult Pop Airplay (Billboard)	12
US Hot Rock & Alternative Songs (Billboard)	2
US Pop Airplay (Billboard)	12
Vietnam Hot 100 (Billboard)	39

== Certifications ==
Certifications for "Earrings"
Region	Certification	Certified units/sales
Australia (ARIA)	Platinum	70,000^{‡}
Canada (Music Canada)	Platinum	80,000^{‡}
Hungary (MAHASZ)	Gold	2,000^{‡}
New Zealand (RMNZ)	Platinum	30,000^{‡}
Portugal (AFP)	Gold	12,000^{‡}
United Kingdom (BPI)	Silver	200,000^{‡}
United States (RIAA)	Platinum	1,000,000^{‡}
^{‡} Sales+streaming figures based on certification alone.

== Release history ==
Release dates and formats for "Earrings"
Region	Date	Format	Label(s)	Ref.
United States	April 14, 2026	Contemporary hit radio	Columbia	
Italy	July 10, 2026	Radio airplay	Sony	
