= Malcolm Todd (album) =

2025 studio album by Malcolm Todd

Studio album by Malcolm Todd
- Released: April 4, 2025
- Genres: Alternative R&B; indie pop
- Length: 37:33
- Label: Columbia
- Producers: Malcolm Todd; Jonah Cochran; Charlie Ziman

Malcolm Todd chronology
Sweet Boy (2024)	Malcolm Todd (2025)	Do That Again (2026)

Alternative cover
- Malcolm Todd (still)

Singles from Malcolm Todd
- 1. "Chest Pain (I Love)" Released: December 4, 2024; 2. "Bleed" Released: February 28, 2025; 3. "Cheer Me On" Released: March 28, 2025; 4. "Original" Released: July 18, 2025

Malcolm Todd is the debut studio album by the American singer-songwriter and musician Malcolm Todd, released on April 4, 2025 by Columbia Records. It follows his 2024 mixtape Sweet Boy and contains a guest feature from Omar Apollo. Three singles were released in support of the album: "Chest Pain (I Love)", which went viral on social media, "Bleed", and "Cheer Me On". A deluxe version of the album, Malcolm Todd (still), was released on August 8, 2025, and was promoted with the single "Original".

The album received generally positive reviews from music critics and became Todd's first entry on the Billboard 200, peaking at number 49.

== Background and recording ==
Malcolm Todd released his debut mixtape Sweet Boy in April 2024. It was his third project overall, following the EPs Demos Before Prom and Shower Shoes. He gained exposure through the virality of the songs "Art House" and "Roommates" from the mixtape.

== Production and composition ==
=== Overview ===
The album is primarily an alternative R&B and indie pop album. The album is produced by Todd along with his bandmate Jonah Cochran and Charlie Ziman. It contains funky guitar riffs, drum beats, and electronic synthesizers.

=== Songs ===
The opening track, "Harry Styles", is a short, ironic song in which Todd compares himself to Harry Styles, saying "But if I’m not a Harry Styles / They’re gonna put me on the shelf." over passive instrumentation. He also reminisces his failed attempt to perform at the Camp Flog Gnaw Carnival in 2024. "Make Me a Better Man" is a blues-influenced track that contains crooning about sexuality and masculinity and a guitar solo that Rolling Stone likened to work of Mk.gee. "Bleed" is a smooth collaboration with Omar Apollo. "Concrete" is co-written by Todd's sister and Gracie Abrams collaborator Audrey Hobert. On "Florence", a ballad, Todd adds a rock influence, and he strips back the instrumentals on "I'll Come Back for You", the closing track.

== Release and promotion ==
Malcolm Todd released the first single from the album, "Chest Pain (I Love)", on December 4, 2024. It went viral on TikTok, especially in Southeast Asia, after he teased a snippet the week before its release. On February 26, 2025, he announced the album and released the single "Bleed", featuring Omar Apollo, two days later. In the song's music video, Jack Harlow, Harry Daniels, and Keith William Richards make cameo appearances. Todd also announced a North American tour, The Wholesome Rockstar Tour, from May to June. He released the third and final single, "Cheer Me On", on March 28. During March, "Chest Pain (I Love)" received more attention when it was used in a viral video from the video game R.E.P.O.

On July 18, Todd announced a deluxe edition of the album called Malcolm Todd (still), which was on August 8. He released the single "Original" for it on the same day as the announcement.

== Critical reception ==
Professional ratings
Review scores
Source	Rating
AllMusic	3.5/5 stars
The Daily Californian	3.5/5 stars
The Ithacan	5/5 stars
Rolling Stone	3.5/5 stars
The State Hornet	9/10

The album received generally positive reviews. Marcy Donelson of AllMusic gave the album 3.5 out of 5 stars, comparing Todd to Steve Lacy and Dominic Fike and noting how he does not take himself too seriously. Larisha Paul of Rolling Stone rated it the same, noting his similarities to an alternative pop star that focuses on his self-awareness, flaws, and resilience. In June, the magazine named it as one of "The Best Albums of 2025 So Far". Adam Camarena, writing for The State Hornet, gave the album a 9/10, highlighting the cohesiveness of the album and Todd's growth and maturity, although he thought the album could be longer. Mariana Contreras of The Ithacan rated it 5 out of 5 stars, praising his unconformity to mainstream music and experimental production.

== Commercial performance ==
The album debuted at number 103 on the Billboard 200 chart dated April 19, 2025, earning 12,000 equivalent album units. In the same week, the lead single "Chest Pain (I Love)" also debuted and peaked at number 68 on the Billboard Hot 100. Both marked his first entries on the two charts. Following the release of the deluxe in August, the album re-entered the Billboard 200 at a new peak of number 49.

== Track listing ==
All tracks are produced by Jonah Cochran, Malcolm Todd, and Charlie Ziman, except "Harry Styles" and "Good Job Malcolm" (produced by Jonah Cochran and Malcolm Todd).

Malcolm Todd track listing
No.	Title	Writer(s)	Length
1.	"Harry Styles"	Malcolm Hobert; Jonah Cochran	1:31
2.	"Make Me a Better Man"	M. Hobert; Cochran	3:30
3.	"Who's the Fool"	M. Hobert; Cochran; Charlie Ziman	1:56
4.	"Chest Pain (I Love)"	M. Hobert; Cochran	3:20
5.	"Doll"	M. Hobert; Cochran; Ziman	1:59
6.	"Bleed" (featuring Omar Apollo)	M. Hobert; Cochran; Ziman; Omar Velasco	2:59
7.	"Good Job Malcolm"	M. Hobert; Cochran	1:00
8.	"Lying"	M. Hobert; Cochran	2:03
9.	"Walk to Class"	M. Hobert; Cochran	3:48
10.	"Florence"	M. Hobert; Ziman; Cochran	3:05
11.	"Concrete"	M. Hobert; Audrey Hobert; Cochran	2:53
12.	"I Do"	Al Burton; David Kurtz; Michael Jacobs	1:00
13.	"Cheer Me On"	M. Hobert; Cochran; Ziman	4:17
14.	"I'll Come Back For You"	M. Hobert; Cochran; Ziman	4:07
Total length:			37:33

Malcolm Todd (still) track listing
No.	Title	Writer(s)	Length
15.	"Attention"	M. Hobert; Ziman; Cochran	1:53
16.	"Nemo"	M. Hobert; Cochran	3:39
17.	"Zip Up My Fly"	M. Hobert	2:11
18.	"Original"	M. Hobert; Ziman; Cochran	3:15
Total length:			48:32

== Charts ==
Chart performance for Malcolm Todd
Chart (2025–2026)	Peak position
Australian Albums (ARIA)	61
US Billboard 200	49
