= Do That Again (Malcolm Todd album) =

2026 studio album by Malcolm Todd

Studio album by Malcolm Todd
- Released: June 5, 2026
- Studios: Electric Lady Studios (New York); Chaplin Studios (Los Angeles)
- Genres: Indie pop; Alternative R&B
- Length: 35:44
- Label: Columbia

Malcolm Todd chronology
Malcolm Todd (2025)	Do That Again (2026)

Singles from Do That Again
- 1. "Breathe" Released: March 13, 2026; 2. "I Saw Your Face" Released: April 23, 2026; 3. "Obsessica" Released: November 27, 2026

Do That Again is the second studio album by American singer-songwriter and musician Malcolm Todd, released on June 5, 2026, by Columbia Records. Supported by two singles, "Breathe", "I Saw Your Face", and "Obsessica", the album was recorded over a six-month period in New York and Los Angeles. The album's title was inspired by a journal entry of Todd's, as well as Marvin Gaye's I Want You (1976).

Musically, Do That Again is a classic pop and modern R&B album that explores themes of relationship issues and the cycle of youth. It received mixed reception from critics with some praising the honesty and vulnerability of the album and others pointing out clichés.

== Background ==
Do That Again was recorded over a period of six months between Electric Lady Studios in New York and Chaplin Studios in Los Angeles. The Line of Best Fit stated that the album reflects personal growth. The album was announced in late April, with "Breathe" and "I Saw Your Face" released as singles. The album was released on June 5, 2026, through Columbia Records. "Obsessica" is scheduled to be released as a single on November 27.

It follows the release of his 2025 self-titled debut, Malcolm Todd, and its deluxe version. Todd stated in an interview that the title of the album was derived from a journal entry session. Additionally, Todd cited the concise phrasing of Marvin Gaye's I Want You (1976) as an inspiration for the title. On the cover of Do That Again, he sits in a bathtub, holding a beer while naked. In Interview magazine, Todd was asked why he was naked on the cover art, to which he replied, "Because we're born naked. I've been shirtless my whole life." The promotional video for the album depicts Todd with his pants falling down.

== Composition and themes ==
=== Overview ===
Regis stated that the theme of Do That Again revolves around the cycle of youth, relationship issues, and the fragility of men, backed up by the songs "Breathe" and "I Saw Your Face". Do That Again has elements of classic pop and modern R&B. The album also has elements of indie rock, which was observed by Melodic Magazine. The author also stated that the album had a "growing emotion of self-resentment". According to AllMusic, it "finds Malcolm Todd continuing to bounce" between the genres of guitar pop, bedroom pop, and R&B. It is described by Clash as being influenced by a period when Todd was newly single and socially active.

=== Tracks ===
In the first track, "Jean Skirt", Todd sings over a "crescendo of guitars". The introduction was observed by Melodic Magazine to be a "mix of rock-heavy guitars and indie-pop riffs". In the next track, "Obsessica", he "lets his infatuation lead to a more raspy delivery". On the song, there are muted guitars and music boxes on "either side of the mix". "Free.99" was stated to have a "heavy overload" of guitars, where Todd has regret. Melodic Magazine stated that the song sounded "raw" and "of-the-moment".

"Breathe" explores themes of sexual desire and yearning, while "I Saw Your Face" explores the themes of male vulnerability and heartbreak. The drums in "Breathe" were stated to be experimental, while Todd's vocals in the song are "flirtatious". In "I Saw Your Face", he sings "I love you more than you will know / For that reason I let you go". He then goes on to explain that line in the Interview magazine, stating, "Yeah, if you love someone and it's not right, you have to let them go, selfishly." The sixth track, "Difficult Love", is about Todd being eager to find a lover. It was stated to have "over-saturated vocals" at a slower pace, while having a "bare" production.

On the seventh track, "Malcolm in the Middle", which is named after the 2000s sitcom of the same name, Todd sings about love and delusion. He was stated to show "an anxious attachment to a relationship" in the song. In the next track, "Ain't That the Truth", he expresses his frustration with his relationship as he sings about wanting to "leave again and again". Melodic Magazine stated that Todd's vocals are "restrained but [heavy]", while takjing inspiration from "rock sounds of the 2000s".

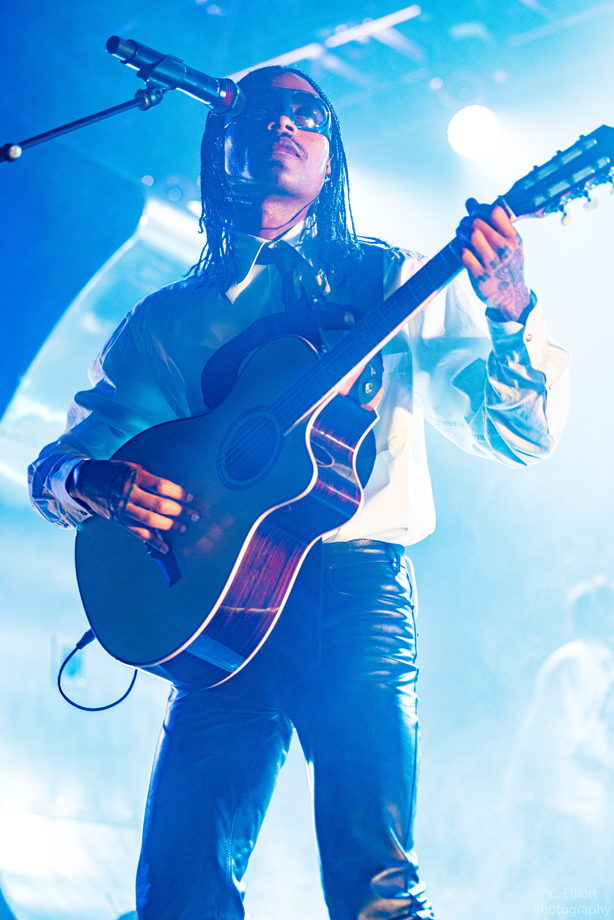
Steve Lacy co-produced and performed on the album's title track

In "Gun to My Head", Todd considers ending his relationship to pursue his career, where he sings "We were invincible / Till my second record deal." He also sings "I gave up loving you to pretend that I'm famous now." He states in the Interview magazine that because there are so many connections because he is famous, he has difficulty knowing which relationships are genuine. In "X's & O's", there was originally a voicemail from a "girl that [Todd's] cousin knew", but was removed because he "realiz[ed] people were going to think it's [his] ex-girlfriend". In the song, he struggles with letting go of a relationship, singing, "I can't control my emotions when you're near".

The eleventh track, "Lonely Song", was stated to have a "grainier texture" than the rest of the album. In the song, he sings about having to deal with his loneliness, while sampling "Mr. Lonely" by Bobby Vinton. "Goodbye" is about Todd and his partner saying goodbye, while Todd reflects on their relationship. He is stated to have "small voice cracks" in the opening verse, over an electric guitar. In the final song, "Do That Again", which is the final track, Todd believes it reflects a matured version of himself. According to Todd, Steve Lacy helped produced the song, in which he plays the guitar and bass.

== Critical reception ==
Professional ratings
Aggregate scores
Source	Rating
Metacritic	67/100
Review scores
Source	Rating
AllMusic	2.5/5 stars
Beats Per Minute	40%
PopMatters	8/10
Rolling Stone	4/5 stars

Do That Again received mixed reviews from critics. On the review aggregator Metacritic, Do That Again received a 67 out of 100. Critics praised the album for its songwriting and emotionality. Writing for PopMatters, Matthew Dwyer, who rated the album an 8 out of 10, praised "X's & O's" for Todd's performance on the track, stating that its as "convincing enough to land him a starring role in an A24 film." They stated that "I Saw Your Face" is the album's "emotional centerpiece," while also praising the album's general songwriting. Jon Dolan of Rolling Stone rated the album a 4 out of 5, praising Todd's self-awareness in his songs and the production of "Breathe". They acclaimed his ability to blend genres and his performance on "Malcolm in the Middle", while also praising the songwriting of the album. In a profile for the Los Angeles Times, Katie Simons stated that Do That Again "[built] upon the grooves of his previous work", while also stating that it "[felt] more honest than past releases." She praised Todd's vulnerability on "Gun to My Head" and stated that the album "reflects a matured version of himself." Steve Forstneger of Beats per Minute rated the about a 40%. They praised "I Saw Your Face", calling it the "standout" track and says that it is "so strong that it almost justifies cobbling an album around it." Ezra Kendrick of Melodic Magazine acclaimed the album for being "the most consistent and fleshed-out" release from Todd. They call "Goodbye" a "clear standout" track, as it is "the most raw" song on the album, concluding that Do That Again is Todd's "most mature yet lively work."

Critics also criticized the album for relying on clichés and Todd's singing and songwriting. Writing for AllMusic, Marcy Donelson, who rated the album a 2.5 out of 5, stated that the album was "not quite as charming this time around." They criticize the songwriting in "Obsessica", using the line "I wanna explore it/I'm a tourist" as an example. Forstneger criticizes Todd's writing of "hotel-sex fantasies". They also state that the album's humor is "lowbrow", citing the fantasy about "the hot bisexual woman who's into guys this week." Kendrick condemns "I Saw Your Face" as "the song doesn't really stand out compared to the rest of the album." They also criticize "Ain't That the Truth", stating that it is "not a clear highlight of the album". Katherine St. Asaph, who is writing for Stereogum, compares "Free.99" to "a timeworn photocopy of 'Unchained Melody'", criticizing the song's originality. They also criticize the jokes, stating that "the jokes are funny; more often, I grit my teeth."

== Commercial performance ==
In the United States, Do That Again debuted at number five on the Billboard 200 with 67,000 album-equivalent units in its first week, according to Billboard. Of that total, 30,000 were traditional album sales—including 19,000 on vinyl—while 37,000 were streaming-equivalent units. The album entered the top 10 of seven Billboard charts, reaching number two on Top Album Sales, Vinyl Albums, and Top Rock & Alternative Albums. Its debut marked Todd's first top-10 entry on the Billboard 200 and his highest-charting release to date.

Internationally, Do That Again achieved moderate success. The album peaked at number 19 on the UK Albums Chart, where it remained for two weeks, and reached the top 10 in Australia (No. 3) and New Zealand (No. 7).

== Tour ==
On June 8, 2026, Todd announced the Do That Again Tour, a North American headline tour promoted by Live Nation. The run is preceded by festival appearances at the Osheaga Music & Arts Festival in Montreal on August 1 and the Outside Lands Music and Arts Festival in San Francisco on August 8, 2026. An artist presale opened on June 9, 2026, ahead of the general on-sale on June 11.

Following the presale, second and third performances were added in several markets, including Austin, Atlanta, Philadelphia, New York, Toronto, Chicago, Seattle, Oakland and Los Angeles; promotional material for the tour described it as having sold out during the artist presale. The tour concludes with three consecutive nights at the Greek Theatre in Los Angeles on October 28, 29 and 30, 2026.

== Track listing ==
All tracks are written by Malcolm Todd, Matthew Castellanos, Jonah Cochran.

Do That Again track listing
No.	Title	Writer(s)	Producers	Length
1.	"Jean Skirt"	Malcolm Todd; Charlie Ziman; Jonah Cochran; Matthew Castellanos	Charlie Ziman; Jonah Cochran; Malcolm Todd; Matthew Castellanos	0:59
2.	"Obsessica"	Todd; Ziman; Jackson Tracy; Jasper Harris; Cochran; Castellanos	Ziman; Jackson Tracy; Jasper Harris; Cochran; Todd; Castellanos	3:39
3.	"Free.99"	Todd; Cochran; Castellanos	Cochran; Todd; Castellanos	2:49
4.	"Breathe"	Blake Slatkin; Ziman; Harris; Cochran; Todd; Castellanos	Ziman; Harris; Cochran; Todd	2:56
5.	"I Saw Your Face"	Slatkin; Cochran; Todd; Castellanos	Blake Slatkin; Cochran; Todd; Castellanos	3:09
6.	"Difficult Love"	Ziman; Cochran; Todd; Castellanos	Ziman; Cochran; Todd; Castellanos	2:33
7.	"Malcolm in the Middle"	Ziman; Tracy; Harris; Cochran; Todd; Castellanos	Ziman; Harris; Cochran; Todd; Castellanos	2:38
8.	"Ain't That the Truth"	Ziman; Harris; Cochran; Todd; Castellanos	Ziman; Harris; Cochran; Todd; Castellanos	2:02
9.	"Gun to My Head"	Ziman; Harris; Cochran; Todd; Castellanos	Ziman; Harris; Cochran; Todd; Castellanos	2:49
10.	"X's & O's"	Ziman; Cochran; Todd; Castellanos	Ziman; Cochran; Hobert; Castellanos	3:01
11.	"Lonely Song"	Bobby Vinton^{[a]}; Ziman; Gene Allan^{[a]}; Harris; Cochran; Todd; Castellanos	Ziman; Harris; Cochran; Todd; Castellanos	3:20
12.	"Good Bye"	Cochran; Todd; Castellanos	Cochran; Todd; Castellanos	2:40
13.	"Do That Again"	Ziman; Cochran; Todd; Castellanos; Steve Lacy	Ziman; Cochran; Todd; Castellanos; Steve Lacy	3:03
Total length:				35:44

=== Notes ===
- ^{^[a]} "Lonely Song" interpolates "Mr. Lonely", written by Bobby Vinton and Gene Allan.
- Physical editions swap the order of "Obsessica" and "Breathe"; include a different voicemail from a woman in place of Todd's voicemail on "X's & O's"; and cut the outro of "Lonely Song", making it around 50 seconds shorter.

== Personnel ==
Credits and personnel adapted from Tidal.

- Malcolm Todd - producer, composer, lyricist, vocals, guitarist, bassist, programmer, keyboardist
- Charlie Ziman - producer, composer, lyricist, programmer, recording engineer, drummer,
- Jonah Cochran - producer, composer, lyricist, guitarist, recording engineer, organist, bassist, programmer, drummer, mixing engineer, keyboardist
- Matthew Castellanos - producer, composer, lyricist
- Ruairi O'Flaherty - mastering engineer
- Jon Castelli - mixing engineer
- Jackson Tracy - recording engineer, composer, lyricist
- Jasper Harris - producer, composer, lyricist, keyboardist
- Blake Slatkin - composer, lyricist, producer
- Mike Bozzi - mastering engineer
- Neal H Pogue - mixing engineer
- Dani Perez - mixing engineer
- Steve Lacy - background vocals, bassist, guitarist

== Charts ==
Weekly chart performance for Do That Again
Chart (2026)	Peak position
Australian Albums (ARIA)	3
Canadian Albums (Billboard)	14
Irish Albums (Official Charts)	20
Lithuanian Albums (AGATA)	77
New Zealand Albums (RMNZ)	7
Scottish Albums (Official Charts)	11
UK Albums (Official Charts)	19
UK R&B Albums (Official Charts)	1
US Billboard 200	5
US Top Rock & Alternative Albums (Billboard)	2
