= East Lansing Film Festival =

Film festival in Michigan, United States

- Status: active
- Genre: festivals
- Frequency: Annually
- Location: East Lansing
- Coordinates: 42°44′5″N 84°28′50″W
- Country: United States
- Years active: 28–29
- Inaugurated: 1997
- Website: elff.com

The East Lansing Film Festival is the large film festival and second oldest in the state of Michigan. It screens over 100 films in 9 days, including several shorts programs. It is held yearly, usually in early November. The focus is to present a diverse selection of independent and foreign features, documentaries, shorts and student films.

The festival started in 1997 and continues with the help of the City of East Lansing and Michigan State University. The final day of the festival is devoted to Lake Michigan Film Competition which showcases films from Wisconsin, Illinois, Indiana and Michigan.

The festival is operated by the East Lansing Film Society. The ELFS screens films year-round at the new high tech theater, Studio C! in Okemos.
