= Breathe (Malcolm Todd song) =

Single by Malcolm Todd

from the album Do That Again
- Released: March 13, 2026
- Genre: Alternative R&B
- Length: 2:56
- Label: Columbia
- Songwriters: Malcolm Hobart; Jonah Cochran; Charlie Ziman; Jasper Harris; Matthew Castellanos; Blake Slatkin
- Producers: Malcolm Todd; Cochran; Ziman; Harris; Slatkin

Malcolm Todd singles chronology
"Original" (2025)	"Breathe" (2026)	"Earrings" (2026)

Music video
- "Breathe" on YouTube

"Breathe" is a song by American singer-songwriter Malcolm Todd, released on March 13, 2026, as the lead single from his second studio album Do That Again (2026). The song was written by Todd alongside Jonah Cochran, Charlie Ziman, Jasper Harris, Blake Slatkin, and Matthew Castellanos, co-produced by all of them bar the latter.

== Composition ==
"Breathe" is an alternative R&B song, considered reminiscent of "golden age N.E.R.D and Justified-era Justin Timberlake". It contains guitar and layered vocals, with "whispery doubles" beneath the lead vocal, creating an echoing quality of the chorus. Lyrically, the song is about a situationship in which the protagonist longs for intimacy. It opens with Malcolm Todd in a hotel suite with two of his best friends, before centering on him being alone with one of them, whom he is romantically interested in. During the bridge, he conveys his intention to rekindle the connection.

== Critical reception ==
The song received generally positive reviews. Jazmin Kylene of Ones to Watch commented the song "floats by quickly and demands to be looped every time", adding "What makes 'Breathe' so infectious is how much fun Todd is letting himself have, not weighed down by the inevitable pressure of upholding his momentum." Marcus Adetola of Neon called it "a silky R&B track with a guitar groove that sits in the pocket". Sarah Space of Melodic Mag wrote "It oozes style and summer sweetness, with added spicy undertones that all blend into a delightfully devilish minute."

== Music video ==
The music video was directed by Aidan Cullen and released alongside the single. Filmed in Altadena, California, it sees a group of three girls holding Malcolm Todd hostage in their bedroom, having tied him up with cables. He is pushed around in a shopping cart outside and performs in a red tank top inside a wood-paneled living room, where the girls spray him with water guns.

== Charts ==
Chart performance for "Breathe"
Chart (2026)	Peak position
New Zealand Hot Singles (RMNZ)	4
US Billboard Hot 100	75
US Hot Rock & Alternative Songs (Billboard)	13
