= Chest Pain (I Love) =

2024 single by Malcolm Todd

Single by Malcolm Todd

from the album Malcolm Todd
- Released: December 4, 2024
- Length: 3:20
- Label: Columbia
- Songwriters: Malcolm Hobert; Jonah Cochran
- Producers: Malcolm Todd; Cochran; Charlie Ziman

Malcolm Todd singles chronology
"Comfort Me" (2024)	"Chest Pain (I Love)" (2024)	"Bleed" (2025)

"Chest Pain (I Love)" is a song by American singer-songwriter Malcolm Todd, released on December 4, 2024, as the lead single from his 2025 self-titled debut studio album, Malcolm Todd. Considered his breakout hit, it went viral on the video-sharing app TikTok and became his first song to enter the Billboard Hot 100, debuting and peaking at number 68. It has been certified gold in Canada and New Zealand and platinum in the United States.

== Background and promotion ==
Malcolm Todd began teasing the song at his concerts in late 2024, with a fan sharing a clip of one such performance overlaid with a studio-quality snippet of the song in a TikTok video on November 15, 2024. Four days later, Todd posted a video on TikTok using the same sound, of him in the recording studio. It features the second half of the chorus, in which he repeatedly sings "I love". As of April 2025, the official audio has soundtracked over 400,000 clips on the platform, while another variation of the song has been used in over 1.5 million clips. Most of the videos have highlighted the "I love" refrain and centered around the people or things that the creators like.

In 2025, the song became the focus of a popular internet meme after Instagram user @notpresidentlloyd uploaded a Twitch livestream clip of the game R.E.P.O. featuring a user named Just_CSmallz rolling on the ground and singing the song. This song is compared to Tyler, The Creator.

The song was sampled in "E85" by Don Toliver, released in early 2026; which gave it traction as well.

== Commercial performance ==
Following the release of its parent album, "Chest Pain (I Love)" debuted on the Billboard Hot 100 at number 68 for the week ending April 19, 2025, gaining 7.7 million on-demand streams. In the same week, the song also entered the top 10 on both Hot Alternative Songs (#9) and Hot Rock & Alternative Songs (#10) charts. On March 16, 2026, the song was certified platinum Recording Industry Association of America.

The song also charted on the Canadian Hot 100 and UK singles chart, peaking at numbers 78 and 93, respectively.

== Charts ==
=== Weekly charts ===
Chart performance for "Chest Pain (I Love)"
Chart (2025)	Peak position
Canada (Canadian Hot 100)	78
Global 200 (Billboard)	101
UK Singles (Official Charts)	93
US Billboard Hot 100	68
US Hot Rock & Alternative Songs (Billboard)	10

=== Year-end charts ===
Year-end chart performance for "Chest Pain (I Love)"
Chart (2025)	Position
US Hot Rock & Alternative Songs (Billboard)	35

== Certifications ==
Certifications for "Chest Pain (I Love)"
Region	Certification	Certified units/sales
Canada (Music Canada)	Gold	40,000^{‡}
New Zealand (RMNZ)	Gold	15,000^{‡}
United States (RIAA)	Platinum	1,000,000^{‡}
^{‡} Sales+streaming figures based on certification alone.
