= R.E.P.O. =

Online cooperative video game by Semiwork

- Developer: Semiwork
- Publisher: Semiwork
- Engine: Unity
- Platforms: Windows; Nintendo Switch 2
- Release: Windows; 26 February 2025 (early access); Nintendo Switch 2; 2027
- Genre: Survival horror
- Modes: Singleplayer; Multiplayer

R.E.P.O. (an acronym for Retrieve, Extract and Profit Operation) is an online cooperative survival horror video game developed and published by Swedish game studio Semiwork for Windows. It was released in early access on 26 February 2025 on Steam. It is developed in the Unity game engine.

== Gameplay ==
Three players carrying a valuable dinosaur statue

The gameplay of R.E.P.O. is similar to that of Lethal Company. The game can host up to six players and tasks them with finding valuable items and funny objects. The players must handle the objects carefully and avoid breaking or damaging them which lowers their value, all while bringing the objects to extraction points to receive in-game money called "SURPLUS". While finding objects, various hostile monsters will try to kill the players.

The game adheres to a roguelike format, employing randomized modular layouts to create unique map configurations for each playthrough. These environments exhibit variations in room arrangement, item placement, and enemy distribution. On each level, players are required to fill each quota at each extraction point before escaping to the truck, and players are incentivized to take more valuables to spend more, but risk transporting and managing their valuables and enemy interaction. Between levels, players visit a "Service Station" which allows them to spend their SURPLUS on permanent upgrades, weapons, explosives, various tools, and resources like health and energy for the aforementioned weapons and tools. At its core, R.E.P.O. prioritizes verbal cooperation, coordination, and strategic planning. The game received a 0.4.0 update on May 7, 2026, which introduced a cosmetic system, a redesigned shop, a racing game mode, and several new items.

== Reception ==
Shaun Cichacki of Vice said "R.E.P.O. is 6-player chaos in the greatest way possible", and "I can't get enough". Elie Gould of PC Gamer said "R.E.P.O. is a fantastic co-op horror game that can hold its own against big shots like Lethal Company". As of January 2026, R.E.P.O. has received an "overwhelmingly positive" rating on Steam.

Upon its early access release, R.E.P.O. reached a peak of 230,000 concurrent players during its first weekend. For the week of 11–18 March 2025, it was the highest-grossing paid game on Steam and ranked second in overall revenue behind Valve Corporation's own Counter-Strike 2. As of 11 March 2025, R.E.P.O. had 145,000 active players on Steam.

On November 20, 2025, R.E.P.O. won the Golden Joystick award for Best Early Access Game.

== In other media ==
On October 25, 2025, R.E.P.O.'s player characters, the Semibots, were added as a purchasable outfit inside of Fortnite: Battle Royale as part of the game's "Fortnitemares" Halloween event.
