= Blaine Saunders =

American actress

- Occupation: Actress
- Years active: 2004–present

Blaine Saunders is an American actress best known for her recurring role as Carly on the ABC sitcom The Middle.

== Early life and career ==
In 2006, Saunders starred as the titular character in Janie, a short film about an only child whose life is shattered when a brother she never knew existed shows up to live with the family. The film screened at festivals internationally, from 2006 to 2009, winning a variety of awards.

Beginning in 2009, Saunders played Carly on The Middle, one of Sue Heck's (Eden Sher) best friends. She was promoted to guest star in 2010. For the role, she was nominated at the 32nd Young Artist Awards for Best Performance in a TV Series - Recurring Young Actress 17–21.

In 2011, Saunders played Becky, a Werepanther, in four episodes of True Blood. She has also appeared on Malcolm in the Middle, Days of Our Lives, and Medium. In 2010, she starred in the ABC pilot A House Divided.

== Personal life ==
Saunders became engaged to Matt Jacquez in 2016.

== Filmography ==
=== Film ===
Year	Title	Role	Notes
2004	Repressing Tansy	Lisette	Short film
2004	The Taking	Isobel	Short film
2005	A Host of Trouble	Harriet	Short film
2006	Janie	Janie	Short film
2006	Max and the Furious Fly	Lauren	Short film
2008	From the Chest	The Reds #3	Short film
2010	Chase the Slut	Young Tibb	
2011	Monkey	Jamie	Short film
2015	The Fetch	Foutain	Short film
2017	Billy Boy	Young girl	
2020	Guide On	Shophie Ryder	Short film
2021	Reparanting	Pizza girl	Short film

=== Television ===
Year	Title	Role	Notes
2005	Medium	9-year-old girl	Episode: "Lucky"
2006	Thresold	Daughter	Episode: "Outbreak"
2006	A House Divided	Nan Sampson	TV movie
2007	Final Approach	Jilly Gilford	TV movie
2010	The Quinn-tuplets	Teenage Rachel Quinn	TV movie
2010-2018	The Middle	Carly	25 episodes
2011	True Blood	Becky	4 episodes
2014	Review	Meg Carmichael	Episode: "Stealing, Addiction, Prom"
2015	Battle Creek	Cece	Episode: "Cereal Killer"
2016	The Perfect Daughter	Tess	TV movie
