= Ones to Watch =

American music blog

- Website type: Music blog
- Owners: Live Nation; Skype Inc. (former)
- Website: onestowatch.com
- Commercial: Yes
- Launched: October 2013

Ones to Watch is an American music blog primarily aimed at showcasing new talent. The website was created independently by House of Blues Entertainment (a division of Live Nation Entertainment) in October 2013, before becoming a collaborative venture with Skype Inc. in February 2014. In September 2016, French telecommunications company Alcatel started a marketing sponsorship with Ones to Watch. The publication is currently based in Los Angeles and is powered by Live Nation Entertainment exclusively. Ones to Watch alumni include Dua Lipa, Logic and Imagine Dragons.

Ones to Watch continuously holds concert tours and series with Live Nation and Skype. These tours often headline one act and guest multiple supporting acts whilst performing at venues of the House of Blues franchise.

Their website's main interface includes a panel of new artists which can be filtered alphabetically and by genre, in addition to the newest blogposts and a Spotify playlist (#NowWatching) of music released in that week. The publication created a YouTube channel in January 2019, which has since gained millions of views. Their most popular video series, "Live from the Rooftop", has over 32 episodes consisting of live acoustic performances from the Live Nation Headquarters on Hollywood Boulevard. Other series include one-on-one introduction interviews with new artists ("Who Is?"), self-recorded video tutorials by artists themselves ("How To") as well as simple live performances ("All Eyes On").
