= Kenya (disambiguation) =

Kenya is a country in Africa.

Kenya may also refer to:

== Places ==
- Kenya Colony, the former British colony (1920–1963)
- Kenya (1963–1964), a former sovereign state
- Kenya, Lubumbashi, a commune of the city of Lubumbashi in the Democratic Republic of the Congo
- Mount Kenya after which the country is named

== Other uses ==
- Kenya (given name), a given name
- Ken'ya, a masculine Japanese given name

== See also ==
- Kenia (disambiguation)
