= Steffani Brass =

American actress

- Born: Steffani Anne Brass Vaughn; February 16, 1992 (age 34); Woodland Hills, California, U.S.
- Occupation: Actress
- Years active: 1997–present
- Website: www.steffanibrass.com

Steffani Anne Brass Vaughn (born February 16, 1992) is an American actress.

Brass was born in Woodland Hills, California. She is the youngest of four children; she has two older sisters and an older brother. She also has a nephew.

Brass started acting during her early years, appearing in a commercial for Pampers diapers at six months old. Since then, she has starred in over 50 national commercials and print ads combined. Brass's first appearance on television was as a little girl named Kelly on an episode of The Amanda Show when she was seven years old. She starred in an episode of The Amanda Show again two years later, playing Becky. Brass has appeared on Everybody Loves Raymond, ER, Malcolm in the Middle, Friends and That 70's Show, amongst other TV programs. She has also starred in several films, with the last one being Target in 2004. From May 2006 to May 2007 she starred in her own web show, GirlTalkTV, with fellow actress Abigail Mavity.

== Personal life ==
She has two older sisters named Tammi and Amanda, a brother named Bryan, and a nephew named Kevin.

She is close friends with Spencer Locke, Dyllan Christopher and Abigail Mavity.

She is 5 ft 2 in (1.57 m).

== Filmography ==
Year	Title	Role	Notes
1999	The Amanda Show	Kelly	"Big Baby Babysitter"
2000	Everybody Loves Raymond	Friend at Bus Stop	"Bully on the Bus"
2000	If These Walls Could Talk 2	Ella	TV film
2000	ER	Shelly Burke	"Loose Ends"
2000	Running Mates	Brooke Pryce	TV film
2001	Untitled Sisqo Project	Danielle	TV movie
2001	The Amanda Show	Becky	"Face & Zawyer"
2001	Malcolm in the Middle	Eliza	"Hal Quits"
2001	CSI: Crime Scene Investigation	Sandy Dantini	"Justice is Served"
2001	Gideon's Crossing	Charmaine	"Freak Show"
2001	The Andy Dick Show	Granddaughter	"Pee-Bop"
2001	Friends	Melinda	"The One After I Do"
2001	The Parkers	Danielle	"Take the Cookies and Run"
2001	NYPD Blue	Janie Wessner	"Hit the Road, Clark"
2002	Dawg	Lindsay Anne Wickman	aka Bad Boy (filming title)
2002	Bundy	Julie	aka Bundy (UK) (US: working title)
2002	For the People	Emma Jonas	"Pawns"
2003	Oliver Beene	Bee Girl	"Lord of the Bees"
2003	Without a Trace	Wendy	"Fallout: Part 2"
2003	Miracles	Renata	"The Battle at Shadow Ridge"
2003	A Carol Christmas	Lindsey	TV film
2003	Gilmore Girls	Young Lorelai	"Dear Emily and Richard"
2004	Silver Lake	Young Julie Patterson	TV film
2004	That '70s Show	Colette/Little Jackie	"Young Man Blues"
2004	Target	Lisa Snow	Film
2004	Sweden, Ohio	Michelle	TV movie
2004	Two and a Half Men	Debbie	"My Doctor Has a Cow Puppet"
2004	Crossing Jordan	Monroe's Daughter	"Intruded"
2004	Six Feet Under	Michaela	"Falling Into Place"
2004	Six Feet Under	Michaela	"Can I Come Up Now?"
2004	Six Feet Under	Michaela	"The Black Forest"
2004	Six Feet Under	Michaela	"Untitled"
2005	Six Feet Under	Michaela	"A Coat of White Primer"
2009	This Might Hurt	Stephanie	TV movie
2010	Two and a Half Men	Amy	"Keith Moon Is Vomiting in His Grave"
2011	No Ordinary Family	Stacey Adams	"No Ordinary Brother"
2011	Love Begins	Rose	TV film
2011	Secret Life of the American Teenager	Lindsey	"Don't Go in There"
2012	The Middle	Daughter	"The Bridge"
2012	The Middle		"The Clover"
2014	See Me	Kristen	Short Film
2015	Babysitter's Black Book	Gilli	TV film
2016	Reawakened	Michele Chadwick	Film
2016	The Private Eye	Jenny	Film
2017	Return to Destiny		Film
