= Kenia =

Kenia is a given name and a surname. Notable people with the name include:

- Levan Kenia (born 1990), Georgian footballer
- Kenia Arias, American singer-songwriter
- Kenia Enríquez (born 1993), Mexican boxer
- Kenia Jayantilal, Indian cricketer
- Kenia Lechuga (born 1994), Mexican Olympic rower
- Kenia López Rabadán (born 1974), Mexican politician
- Kenia Moreta (born 1981), Dominican Republic volleyball player
- Kenia Olvera (born 1975), Mexican volleyball player
- Kenia Os (born 1999), Mexican singer-songwriter
- Kenia Rangel (born 1995), Panamanian footballer
- Kenia Rodríguez, Cuban Olympic judoka
- Kenia Seoane Lopez, American attorney and judge
- Kenia Sinclair, Jamaican runner
- Kenia Villalobos (born 1999), Mexican paratriathlete

== See also ==
- Kenias Tembo (born 1955), Zimbabwean Olympic long-distance runner
- Kenya (disambiguation)
