= The Middle season 5 =

The Middle
- Season 5
- Region 1 DVD cover art
- Starring: Patricia Heaton; Neil Flynn; Charlie McDermott; Eden Sher; Atticus Shaffer
- No. of episodes: 24

Release
- Original network: ABC
- Original release: September 25, 2013 – May 21, 2014

Season chronology
- ← Previous; Season 4 Next → Season 6

The fifth season of the television comedy series The Middle began airing on September 25, 2013 on ABC in the United States. It is produced by Blackie and Blondie Productions and Warner Bros. Television with series creators DeAnn Heline and Eileen Heisler as executive producers.

The show features Frances "Frankie" Heck (Patricia Heaton), a working-class, Midwestern woman married to Mike Heck (Neil Flynn) who resides in the small fictional town of Orson, Indiana. They are the parents of three children, Axl (Charlie McDermott), Sue (Eden Sher), and Brick (Atticus Shaffer).

== Cast ==
=== Main cast ===
- Patricia Heaton as Frankie Heck
- Neil Flynn as Mike Heck
- Charlie McDermott as Axl Heck
- Eden Sher as Sue Heck
- Atticus Shaffer as Brick Heck

=== Recurring cast ===
- Jack McBrayer as Dr. Ted Goodwin, Frankie's over-friendly boss who is oblivious to sarcasm. He appears in the following episodes.

Thanksgiving V, War Of The Heck’s, and The Optimist.

- Galadriel Stineman as Cassidy Finch, Axl's ex-girlfriend who broke up with him when they went to different colleges. She appears in the following episodes.

The Award, Stormy Moon, and The Smell.

- Beau Wirick as Sean Donahue, Axl's best friend. He appears in the following episodes.

The 100th, The Kiss, Sleepless In Orson, Vacation Days, Stormy Moon, and The Walk.

- John Gammon as Darrin, Axl's friend and Sue's ex and later boyfriend. He appears in the following episodes.

Change In The Air, The 100th, The Kiss, Sleepless In Orson, The Award, The Walk, The Wind Chimes, Office Hours, and Heck’s On A Hard Body.

- Brock Ciarlelli as Brad, Sue's ex-boyfriend and current classmate. He appears in the following episodes.

Change In The Air, The 100th, Sleepless In Orson, The Award, Vacation Days, The Walk, and Heck’s On A Hard Body.

- Alphonso McAuley as Hutch, Axl's football teammate and best friend at college. He appears in the following episodes.

Halloween IV The Ghost Story, The Carpool, The Award, The Smell, The Wind Chimes, and The Optimist.

- Brian Doyle-Murray as Don Ehlert, Frankie's ex-boss. He appears in the following episodes.

The 100th, Office Hours, and Heck On A Hard Body.

=== Guest cast ===
- Rachel Dratch as Principal Barker, Brick's middle-school principal. She Appears in "The Potato" and "The Carpool".
- Marsha Mason as Pat Spence, Frankie's mother. She Appears in "Thanksgiving V".
- Jerry Van Dyke as Tag Spence, Frankie's father. He Appears in "Thanksgiving V".
- Mary Birdsong as Marlene, Rusty's ex-wife. She Appears in "Thanksgiving V".
- Dave Foley as Dr. Chuck Fulton, Brick's school therapist. He Appears in "Sleepless In Orson".
- Keegan-Michael Key as Reverend Deveaux, a charismatic minister who visits the Hecks' church through a minister-exchange program. He Appears in "Hungry Games".
- Casey Wilson as Reverend Tammy, Reverend TimTom's new girlfriend and performing partner. She Appears in "Stormy Moon".
- Nicole Sullivan as Vicki, Frankie and Mike's new neighbor, Dale's wife. She Appears in "The Walk".
- Matt Braunger as Dale, Frankie and Mike's new neighbor, Vicki's husband. He Appears in "The Walk".
- Brooke Shields as Rita Glossner, the Hecks' uncouth and troubled neighbor. She Appears in "The Wind Chimes".
- Chris Kattan as Bob, Frankie's friend. He Appears in "Office Hours".
- Norm Macdonald as Rusty Heck, Mike's brother. He Appears in "Heck On A Hard Body".
- Mitch Silpa as Todd, Walt Disney World's manager. He Appears in "The Wonderful World Of The Hecks".
- Mindy Cohn as Kimberly, Walt Disney World's nurse. She Appears in "The Wonderful World Of The Hecks".

== Episodes ==
No. overall	No. in season	Title	Directed by	Written by	Original release date	Prod. code	U.S. viewers (millions)
97	1	"The Drop Off"	Lee Shallat Chemel	DeAnn Heline & Eileen Heisler	September 25, 2013	4X5501	8.94
Against Axl's wishes, the whole family takes him to college at East Indiana State University and helps him move into the dorm. Meanwhile, Brick keeps losing his new cell phone because he has holes in his pockets, and Sue anxiously awaits a phone call from school confirming her to Junior Peer Leadership Supervisor.
98	2	"Change in the Air"	Blake T. Evans	Jana Hunter & Mitch Hunter	October 2, 2013	4X5502	8.03
Brick starts middle school and deals with a new fear of using the school bathroom. Meanwhile, Sue feels a sense of freedom without Axl around. She then runs into Darrin and learns that he has a girlfriend. Meanwhile, Frankie finds that Axl is texting only Mike and is determined to get him to text her.
99	3	"The Potato"	Lee Shallat Chemel	Tim Hobert	October 9, 2013	4X5503	8.25
Wanting to save up to get her own car, Sue gets a job at a mall eatery; Frankie and Mike find out that Brick isn't attending his classes (because he took Sue's advice about middle school wrong); Axl tries to avoid his terrible roommate.
100	4	"The 100th"	Blake T. Evans	David S. Rosenthal	October 23, 2013	4X5504	8.31
Mike and Frankie begrudgingly agree to drive a giant cow float in a parade as the town of Orson celebrates its 100th anniversary. Meanwhile, Sue tries to make Darrin jealous. Elsewhere, Axl, Darrin, and Sean try to make money off the parade spectators by creating a VIP area, and Brick enters a contest to come up with the town's new slogan, which is going to be used for the next 100 years.
101	5	"Halloween IV: The Ghost Story"	Lee Shallat Chemel	Roy Brown	October 30, 2013	4X5505	8.03
It's Halloween at the Heck house. Axl is hazed repeatedly (having to hop on one foot when he gets a text message or being taped to the goal post with the only other freshman on the team, for example) as a college freshman football player. Sue has a bonding sleepover with her fellow Wrestlerettes. They have a seance and Sue claims to see the Santa Maria sail across the family-room wall after trying to awaken the spirit of Christopher Columbus. With his family's help, Brick asks a girl he likes to his school's Halloween dance, using social media. Brick goes to the Halloween dance dressed as a bookmark, where he has an accident and gets a concussion. He then requires his parents to look at his eyes every few hours. When Sue tells her parents about seeing the Santa Maria during the seance, Mike has a long conversation with her, telling her she probably just dreamt it.
102	6	"The Jump"	Elliot Hegarty	Robin Shorr	November 13, 2013	4X5508	8.93
Frankie adopts a dog after her family members constantly make fun of her. Sue shocks her parents by making the school volleyball team. About to flunk out of multiple classes, Axl asks Brick for help.
103	7	"Thanksgiving V"	Lee Shallat Chemel	David S. Rosenthal	November 20, 2013	4X5507	8.53
Thanksgiving finds the Heck household hoarding secrets: Sue and Frankie try to hide Frankie's outlandish behavior at a pre-Thanksgiving sale, while Axl must find a way to inform his parents that he dropped all but one of his classes. Also, Grandpa Tag (Jerry Van Dyke) tries to persuade Grandma Pat (Marsha Mason) not to take a cruise, after squandering away their money playing online poker. Everything comes out during Thanksgiving dinner, with Frankie's boss Dr. Goodwin (Jack McBrayer) and Rusty's wife Marlene (Mary Birdsong) and kids thrown into the chaos. Elsewhere, Brick is determined to have lime-green Jell-O salad for dessert.
104	8	"The Kiss"	Elliot Hegarty	Jana Hunter & Mitch Hunter	December 4, 2013	4X5506	7.41
When Frankie's sister asks her to house-sit, Frankie and Mike jump at the opportunity to have a romantic, kid-free weekend in an upscale house. But technology might override romance when they have difficulties navigating all of the computerized gadgets in the house. Meanwhile Sue, who has been left in charge of Brick, deals with their home being invaded by the bratty Glossner kids; and Axl takes a road trip with Darrin and Sean, bound for Vassar to reconnect with his ex-girlfriend Cassidy.
105	9	"The Christmas Tree"	Lee Shallat Chemel	Tim Hobert	December 11, 2013	4X5509	8.08
Home from college for Christmas vacation, Axl would rather be with friends than family, so he and Frankie must come up with a time-management agreement that will satisfy them both. Meanwhile, Sue has a severe allergic reaction to the Christmas tree; and Brick finds himself running a mini-Ponzi scheme when it's discovered that he lied to the school about his Christmas wrapping-paper sales and must pay back the debt.
106	10	"Sleepless in Orson"	Blake T. Evans	Roy Brown	January 8, 2014	4X5510	8.82
Frankie and Mike become concerned about Brick when he starts expressing a host of irrational fears spawned by a constant stream of news alerts showing up on his refurbished iPad. Darrin attempts his own spinoff of Boss Co with his friends away at college, but Axl and Sean discover and successfully shut down the new operation, though it forces them to finish a difficult job that their competition had started. Meanwhile, Sue is both disgusted and intrigued when Derrick Glossner continues to surprise her with spontaneous kisses.
107	11	"War of the Hecks"	Lee Shallat Chemel	Robin Shorr	January 15, 2014	4X5511	7.51
The ultimate prank battle is on between brother and sister when Sue discovers that Axl stole Orson High's Thundering Hens mascot head over a year ago, forcing Sue to wear an embarrassing chicken head in her role as the school mascot. A friendless Dr. Goodwin invites a reluctant Frankie to accompany him to multiple after-work gatherings; meanwhile, she's forced to give up Colin Firth (the stray dog she took in) just as Mike finally starts to bond with him. Meanwhile, Brick becomes interested in an autobiography of Debbie Reynolds. Note: This episode of The Middle was the first program ever aired on the network Freeform following its rebrand from ABC Family.
108	12	"The Carpool"	Julie Anne Robinson	Jana Hunter & Mitch Hunter	January 22, 2014	4X5512	8.04
With the bus drivers on strike, Principal Barker (Rachel Dratch) asks the parents to form carpools to get the kids to and from school. But with time management not one of Frankie's strong suits, Brick is given less time to get ready and her carpool kids (including Brick) face the possibility of racking up tardy slips which could ruin their chances of being invited to the "No Tardy Party." Meanwhile, Axl hits the books and becomes an expert in Astronomy to attract a female student whom he has fallen for; and Sue desperately wants to attend an Indiana Hoosiers basketball game with Mike because she wants to spend time with her father.
109	13	"Hungry Games"	Lee Shallat Chemel	David S. Rosenthal	February 5, 2014	4X5513	8.56
The Hecks attempt to get out of church in time to use their "VIP seating" coupon for the all-you-can-eat buffet. But guest Reverend Deveaux (Keegan-Michael Key) senses trouble in the family dynamic and delays the Hecks one by one.
110	14	"The Award"	Phil Traill	Katy Ballard	February 26, 2014	4X5514	6.98
Mike gets an award for working at the quarry for twenty years, but is reluctant to go. Sue attempts to hold a "Helping Hands" event, where classmates will hold hands around the whole school. When that fails, she organizes "Mix-it-up Monday", where students from different groups are assigned seats at lunch to get to know their classmates. This works out well for Brad and Carly, who meet new friends, but not so much for Sue. Meanwhile, Axl finds a strange voicemail on his phone left by an apparently drunk young lady, and he covers the campus trying to find the sender. Eventually his ex-girlfriend Cassidy calls to say she was the one, and the episode ends with them talking again. At home, the air conditioner won't shut off, and when Darrin arrives to repair it, he and Sue realize they're both single. Elsewhere, Brick gets a spiffy new suit and tie.
111	15	"Vacation Days"	Phil Traill	Tim Hobert	March 5, 2014	4X5515	7.32
Mike is "forced" to take a vacation; not enjoying it at first, he ends up looking forward to some relaxing days. Unfortunately, Brick has found a load of coupons he made for Father's Days and birthdays and decides to redeem them all at once. Axl makes a surprise visit home before leaving for spring break, which annoys Frankie when she learns he spent the majority of time at the Donahues'. Spending her whole spring break working, Sue overreacts to some negative Yelp reviews of Spudsy's.
112	16	"Stormy Moon"	John Putch	Robin Shorr	March 12, 2014	4X5516	7.48
Frankie is arrested for an overdue library book and suspects Brick. Sue dislikes Reverend TimTom's new girlfriend, Reverend Tammy (Casey Wilson), but isn't sure how to tell him. Meanwhile, Axl and Cassidy reunite during spring break and enjoy a few days of catching up together. Upon parting, Cassidy leaves Axl an abstract painting and says he'll know what it means.
113	17	"The Walk"	Lee Shallat Chemel	David S. Rosenthal	March 26, 2014	4X5517	7.28
Sue has no date for the prom, then gets too many dates as her boss, Sean Donahue, Brad, and Derrick Glossner all ask her out within hours of one another and she's afraid to refuse any of them. Then Darrin asks her and she breaks all the other dates...then ends up going by herself. Meanwhile, Frankie and Mike feel like they're not giving their all to each other after how well they connect with their new neighbors (Nicole Sullivan and Matt Braunger); Axl helps Brick with a book report.
114	18	"The Smell"	Phil Traill	Roy Brown	April 2, 2014	4X5518	7.20
After being goaded by his friend Bill Norwood into taking an assistant-coaching position on the girls' soccer team which now includes Sue, Bill must back out of his duties because of work, making Mike the new head coach; he soon discovers that the girls care more about their various personal issues than about soccer. After discovering that a mysteriously hideous smell in the house is emanating from Brick, Frankie must attempt to introduce her pungent son to better hygiene which backfires because Brick was using the products in the wrong areas of the body. Meanwhile, after Axl asks the girls across from his dorm room if the painting Cassidy left him means they are back together or not, the girls all suddenly start to take an interest in him.
115	19	"The Wind Chimes"	Lee Shallat Chemel	Jana Hunter & Mitch Hunter	April 23, 2014	4X5519	7.19
Rita Glossner puts up wind chimes, which annoys Frankie and leads to a confrontation. Brick obsesses over coming up with a new pretzel product, after hearing a prompt for customer suggestions when he calls the 1-800 number on the box. Axl and Hutch try to move an old couch into their dorm room, thinking it will be good for an apartment they plan to get next semester. Sue announces that she is dating Darrin again.
116	20	"The Optimist"	Lee Shallat Chemel	Tim Hobert	April 30, 2014	4X5520	7.39
With high-school graduation less than two years away, Sue becomes stressed and hunkers down, frantically trying to earn a scholarship to help pay for college. Frankie and Mike are concerned that Sue is socializing with twentysomethings. Dr. Goodwin's business is down because Frankie forgot to send out all of his dental-appointment-reminder cards, so she tries to find a way to send them out without his knowledge. Axl and Hutch try to gain weight for spring football drills. Elsewhere, Brick demands that Mike apologize after Mike defends Brick from a girl that was supposedly bullying him.
117	21	"Office Hours"	Lee Shallat Chemel	Ben Adams	May 7, 2014	4X5521	6.65
Feeling that her mind has been turned into Swiss cheese over her family's endless demands, Frankie sets up "office hours" especially for them to voice their needs. Unfortunately, her hours causes Axl to miss an important deadline. Meanwhile, an overprotective Mike keeps a stern eye on Darrin to make sure he doesn't take advantage of Sue; and Brick invites his surprising new friends home for a book-club meeting.
118	22	"Heck on a Hard Body"	Blake T. Evans	Jana Hunter & Mitch Hunter	May 14, 2014	4X5522	7.14
Sue is determined to win a car in an Ehlert Motors contest that requires her to keep her hand on the car longer than several other contestants. Mike's brother Rusty is homeless again, causing difficulty by both moving in and by accompanying Mike on a trip to Chicago for Brick's spelling bee. Clearing out his dorm room, Axl discovers that he has misplaced an entire desk, jeopardizing a $200 deposit. When a furious Frankie blows in, she winds up reliving her college days with Axl and his pals.
119	23	"Orlando"	Eileen Heisler	David S. Rosenthal	May 21, 2014	4X5523	7.85
Sue counts down the days until the Hecks depart on their road trip to Walt Disney World that she won in the previous episode. Brick begs his parents to take a detour to North Carolina to meet his online girlfriend; Axl anxiously awaits the posting of his final grades as a college freshman.
120	24	"The Wonderful World of Hecks"	Lee Shallat Chemel	Tim Hobert	May 21, 2014	4X5524	7.85
When the Hecks arrive at Walt Disney World, a series of misfortunes threatens their wonderful time.

== Ratings ==
No.	Title	Air date	Rating/Share (18–49)	Viewers (million)	Reference
1	"The Drop Off"	September 25, 2013	2.5/8	8.94	
2	"Change in the Air"	October 2, 2013	2.3/7	8.03	
3	"The Potato"	October 9, 2013	2.2/7	8.25	
4	"The 100th"	October 23, 2013	2.2/7	8.31	
5	"Halloween IV: The Ghost Story"	October 30, 2013	2.2/7	8.03	
6	"The Jump"	November 13, 2013	2.4/7	8.93	
7	"Thanksgiving V"	November 20, 2013	2.3/7	8.53	
8	"The Kiss"	December 4, 2013	1.9/6	7.41	
9	"The Christmas Tree"	December 11, 2013	2.0/6	8.08	
10	"Sleepless in Orson"	January 8, 2014	2.2/7	8.82	
11	"War of the Hecks"	January 15, 2014	1.8/6	7.51	
12	"The Carpool"	January 22, 2014	2.3/7	8.04	
13	"Hungry Games"	February 5, 2014	2.2/6	8.56	
14	"The Award"	February 26, 2014	1.7/6	6.98	
15	"Vacation Days"	March 5, 2014	1.9/6	7.32	
16	"Stormy Moon"	March 12, 2014	2.0/7	7.48	
17	"The Walk"	March 26, 2014	1.9/6	7.28	
18	"The Smell"	April 2, 2014	2.0/7	7.20	
19	"The Wind Chimes"	April 23, 2014	1.9/6	7.19	
20	"The Optimist"	April 30, 2014	1.8/6	7.39	
21	"Office Hours"	May 7, 2014	1.6/6	6.65	
22	"Heck on a Hard Body"	May 14, 2014	1.9/7	7.14	
23	"Orlando"	May 21, 2014	2.1/7	7.85	
24	"The Wonderful World of Hecks"	May 21, 2014	2.1/7	7.85	
