= Ken'ya =

- Gender: Male

Origin
- Origin: Japanese
- Meaning: Different meanings depending on the kanji used

Ken'ya or Kenya (written: 賢也, 賢哉, 研也, 研哉, 建也, 建哉, 健也, 健矢, 兼哉 or 謙弥) is a masculine Japanese given name. Notable people with the name include:

- Alberto Kenya Fujimori Inomoto (1938–2024), former president of Peru
- Kenya Akiba (秋葉 賢也; born 1962), Japanese politician
- Kenya Fujinaka (born 1993), Japanese volleyball player
- Kenya Hara (原 研哉; born 1958), Japanese graphic designer and curator
- Kenya Kobayashi (小林 研也; born 1983), Japanese gymnast
- Kenya Matsui (松井 謙弥; born 1985), Japanese footballer
- Kenya Mitsuhashi (三橋 健也; born 1997), Japanese badminton player
- Kenya Okazaki (岡﨑 建哉; born 1990), Japanese footballer
- Kenya Wakatsuki (若月 健矢; born 1995), Japanese baseball player
- Kenya Yasuda (保田 賢也; born 1989), Japanese water polo player

== See also ==
- Kenya (given name)
