= Target (2004 film) =

- Directed by: William Webb
- Written by: Jim Makichuk
- Produced by: William Webb
- Starring: Stephen Baldwin
- Cinematography: John P. Tarver
- Edited by: Charlene Perrone
- Music by: Alex Wilkinson
- Distributed by: Westwind Group Inc.
- Release date: January 21, 2004
- Running time: 84 minutes
- Country: United States
- Language: English

Target is a 2004 action film directed by William Webb and starring Stephen Baldwin.

== Plot ==
Charlie Snow (Stephen Baldwin) was a highly decorated war hero, a sniper who never placed emotion before the mission. Except once. Providing cover for an undercover arms dealer sting operation, he was forced into a predicament, as through his scope he saw a hostage crisis unfold.

The decision he made cost his fellow soldiers their lives. But he also managed to kill the hostage-taker, arms dealer Lendl Bodnar (Mio Deckala).

Back in the US, Charlie is now a shell of the man he used to be. He has been ostracized from the government, and his family is falling apart. His wife Maggie (Deborah Worthing) is close to finalizing their split.

But Charlie's world is about to get rocked. Lendl Bodnar has a brother named Yevon Bodnar (Yorgo Constantine), an arms dealer who wants revenge on Charlie for Lendl's death.

Charlie's learns that Maggie has been kidnapped, his daughter Lisa (Steffani Brass) and son Sam (Rory Thost) are in danger. Everywhere he turns, he's being attacked by Yevon's men.

Charlie must summon all the tactics that made him such an effective killer and reconnect with his secret ops government links to rescue Maggie and take Yevon down.

== Cast ==
- Stephen Baldwin - Charlie Snow
- James Russo - Donovan
- Steffani Brass - Lisa Snow (as Stephanie Brass)
- Yorgo Constantine - Yevon Bodnar
- Deborah Worthing - Maggie
- Patty McCormack - Maysie
- Rory Thost - Sam Snow
- Tammy Trull - Sunny
- Debra Wilson - Nolan
- Kenya D. Williamson - Miss Demmings
- Igor Jijikine - Leather Jacket
