= The Middle season 7 =

The Middle
- Season 7
- Region 1 DVD cover art
- Starring: Patricia Heaton; Neil Flynn; Charlie McDermott; Eden Sher; Atticus Shaffer
- No. of episodes: 24

Release
- Original network: ABC
- Original release: September 23, 2015 – May 18, 2016

Season chronology
- ← Previous; Season 6 Next → Season 8

The seventh season of the television comedy series The Middle began airing on September 23, 2015, on ABC in the United States. It is produced by Blackie and Blondie Productions and Warner Bros. Television with series creators DeAnn Heline and Eileen Heisler as executive producers.

The show is about Frances "Frankie" Heck (Patricia Heaton), a middle-class, middle-aged Midwestern woman married to Michael "Mike" Heck (Neil Flynn) who resides in the small fictional town of Orson, Indiana. They are the parents of three children, Axl (Charlie McDermott), Sue (Eden Sher), and Brick (Atticus Shaffer).

== Cast ==
=== Main cast ===
- Patricia Heaton as Frankie Heck
- Neil Flynn as Mike Heck
- Charlie McDermott as Axl Heck
- Eden Sher as Sue Heck
- Atticus Shaffer as Brick Heck

=== Recurring ===
- Alphonso McAuley as Charles "Hutch" Hutchinson, Axl's football teammate and best friend at college. His full name is revealed this season.
- Tommy Bechtold as Kenny, Axl and Hutch's weird roommate, a hardcore gamer. He speaks for the first time in "Halloween VI: Tick Tock Death".
- Casey Burke as Cindy Hornberger, Brick's classmate, with whom he is in the early stages of a relationship.
- Daniela Bobadilla as Lexie Brooks, Sue's closest friend at college who becomes her second roommate and is an incredibly kind rich little girl.
- Jen Ray as Nancy Donahue, the Hecks' neighbor and friend.
- Pat Finn as Bill Norwood, the Hecks' neighbor and friend.
- Julie Brown as Paula Norwood, the Hecks' neighbor and friend.
- Beau Wirick as Sean Donahue, one of Axl's friends who is away at college. He shows up this season with a hipster look and claims he is now a vegan.
- Gia Mantegna as Devin Levin, Frankie's hairdresser's relative and Axl's college classmate/ex-girlfriend. They break up when Devin thinks they should see others.
- Brittany Ross and Natalie Lander as Courtney and Debbie, airheaded cheerleaders who dated Axl as one in high school.
- Paul Hipp as Reverend Timothy "TimTom" Thomas, a youth pastor at the Hecks' church.
- Jack McBrayer as Dr. Ted Goodwin, Frankie's boss at the dental office.
- Jovan Armand as Troy, Brick's tall, heavyset classmate who initially protects him at school, then becomes his friend.

=== Guest ===
- Norm Macdonald as Rusty Heck, Mike's brother.
- Brooke Shields as Rita Glossner, the Hecks' uncouth and troubled neighbor.
- Marsha Mason as Pat Spence, Frankie's mother.
- Faith Ford as Sheila, Frankie's co-worker at Heritage Village.
- John Cullum as "Big Mike" Heck, Mike's father.
- Cheryl Hines as Dr. Sommer Samuelson, head of the company that takes over Frankie's dental office.
- Alan Ruck as Jack Kershaw, Axl's boss at Little Betty.
- Brian Stepanek as Merv, Cindy's father.
- Lauren Drasler as LuEllen, Cindy's mother.
- Emily Rutherfurd as Dierdre Peterson, the Hecks' new neighbor.

== Episodes ==
No. overall	No. in season	Title	Directed by	Written by	Original release date	Prod. code	U.S. viewers (millions)
145	1	"Not Your Brother's Drop Off"	Lee Shallat Chemel	Tim Hobert	September 23, 2015	4X7101	8.21
The Hecks face obstacles as they prepare to drop off Sue and Axl at college. Axl has an extra week before his classes begin and doesn't want to go with the family, but Sue insists because they all went with Axl two years ago. Frankie can't bring herself to cry like she did when Axl was leaving, while Mike shows his love for Sue by trying to teach her life lessons. Meanwhile, Brick starts eighth grade and is worried when Cindy says they should take their relationship to the "next level", as he has no idea what that is. Frankie finally realizes that she's not upset about Sue leaving; she feels more confident about Sue doing well on her own away from home than she did about Axl being on his own.
146	2	"Cutting the Cord"	Danny Salles	Rich Dahm	September 30, 2015	4X7102	7.91
Sue struggles to adjust to college. Brick learns he has a protector at school, but gets a little creeped out when the boy starts following him around; and Axl and Hutch deal with a rash of ants in their apartment.
147	3	"The Shirt"	Lee Shallat Chemel	Jana Hunter & Mitch Hunter	October 7, 2015	4X7103	7.30
Mike and Frankie have dinner with the Norwoods, and Mike wears a Hawaiian shirt instead of one of his favored plaids. This causes surprise and shows new sides of Mike's personality, as he also buys a motorcycle. With Axl now in college, Brick realizes he's the only one who must do chores. He thus tries to clean the bathroom following instructions in a YouTube video, but ends up destroying the wall on one side of the bath. Devin and Axl reconcile after a very brief breakup and agree that while in college they should just hang out and have fun.
148	4	"Risky Business"	Phil Traill	Ilana Wernick	October 14, 2015	4X7104	7.12
Mike helps his brother Rusty with his new business idea: printed "rivalry" disposable diapers, but Frankie fears it will be a failure. Axl is back home and determined to convince his parents that he should be trusted to ride the new motorcycle. He starts doing 'dangerous' things to prove he knows how to be safe. Brick is glad Axl is home so he can help him with chores and asks for his help with his new desire -- being allowed to walk home alone from the library at night. Sue begins sleeping in her car to avoid her horrible roommate, and enlists Brad's help.
149	5	"Land of the Lost"	Lee Shallat Chemel	Roy Brown	October 21, 2015	4X7105	7.08
Mike is mopey and upset but doesn't say why, so Frankie calls Reverend TimTom hoping he'll find out what is worrying Mike. It turns out Mike can't cope with Frankie turning 50, taking it as a sign they are both getting close to death. Meanwhile, Axl and Hutch try to complain to their landlord about the conditions at the rental house, they discover that they've been paying rent to a fake landlord. The real one evicts them, so Axl, Hutch, and Kenny temporarily move into the Hecks' home. Sue is thrilled when she runs into Logan, but then loses Brick when he visits her on campus.
150	6	"Halloween VI: Tick Tock Death"	Elliot Hegarty	Tim Hobert	October 28, 2015	4X7106	7.43
Scared when someone dressed as Death knocks on the door and keeps standing in the garden staring at the house, Axl and his friends eventually pack up and flee. Brick goes to the Orson Heights part of town with Mike to get better candy and learns that there is a woman named Cindy, married to a man who loves books, looks like Brick, and whose surname is Heck. All these strange coincidences make him think he is a time traveler. "Death" ends up being Cindy in costume, who was waiting in the yard for Brick to get home. Frankie and Sue decide to get even with Rita Glossner by egging her house.
151	7	"Homecoming II: The Tailgate"	Lee Shallat Chemel	Ilana Wernick	November 11, 2015	4X7107	7.62
Frankie worries that her visiting mom will embarrass her at the tailgate party. Meanwhile, Mike loses his partner in the homecoming cornhole tournament when Axl gets sick, but he soon discovers that Brick is better at the game than his brother...as long as he's not playing in front of a crowd.
152	8	"Thanksgiving VII"	Elliot Hegarty	Rich Dahm	November 18, 2015	4X7108	7.93
Frankie learns that her dentist office has been taken over by a chain and that it will be closed through the end of the year for renovations. She decides to get holiday work at her old standby, the Heritage Village, where she gets called out by co-worker Sheila (Faith Ford) for not taking her role seriously enough. Axl meets Sean and some old high-school friends at a bar, where he laments his current situation at college and shocks everyone by crying. At home, a power outage ruins Mike's day of football-watching so he decides to teach Brick how to play poker. One by one, they are joined in the game by Axl and Frankie as they return home from their tough days. Sue returns to work at Spudsy's hoping she will run into Logan.
153	9	"The Convention"	Lee Shallat Chemel	Jana Hunter & Mitch Hunter	December 2, 2015	4X7109	7.64
Frankie is upset when Dr. Goodwin's office goes through the change of being taken over by a dental conglomerate. She is then forced to go to a convention in Des Moines, Iowa and ropes Mike into going with her, given that the trip's expenses are covered. While there, the two are excited to find that the hotel room has more bells and whistles than their house. They begin raiding the room's mini bar, ordering room service, and renting movies...then later learn that "extras" aren't covered in the convention expenses. Grandpa Big Mike is asked to babysit Brick while his parents are out of town, but Brick soon finds their roles reversed. Axl becomes Sue's dorm roommate, much to her chagrin.
154	10	"Not So Silent Night"	Melissa Kosar	DeAnn Heline & Eileen Heisler	December 9, 2015	4X7110	8.06
Christmas Eve starts off well as the Hecks decide to skip church and relax while watching a service on TV as Frankie doesn't want to go through sitting in the church overflow room. Things go haywire when family photos on the computer accidentally get deleted.
155	11	"The Rush"	Lee Shallat Chemel	Roy Brown	January 6, 2016	4X7111	7.84
Sue makes a new friend while going through sorority rush. Frankie feels useless when she learns Brick went shopping by himself and bought a new pair of pants. Axl starts interviewing for internships and helps Mike learn how to use social media for his diaper business.
156	12	"Birds of a Feather"	Victor Nelli	Tim Hobert	January 13, 2016	4X7112	7.46
Axl's first day as an intern at Little Betty isn't exactly what he thought: he gets assigned the "grunt" work, such as picking up his boss's dry cleaning and caring for a bird called Marshmallows. Frankie is no happier as she returns to work at Smiles Superstars and doesn't like the changes. Mike later tells her that both she and Axl are natural-born complainers. Meanwhile, Cindy tells Mike that she kissed another boy and insists that Mike tell Brick. Meanwhile, Sue's professor challenges her to think outside the box.
157	13	"Floating 50"	Lee Shallat Chemel	Rich Dahm	January 20, 2016	4X7113	7.24
Mike asks Axl and Brick to help him organize a belated party for Frankie's 50th birthday, but Brick is detained by Coach Tink who is convinced that she can turn him into an athlete. There's a further hitch in the plan when the party-goers realize Mike never gave Frankie a time to arrive, leaving the guests anxious and hungry for the party to begin. Sue's attempts to search for a lost sock make her a laughingstock.
158	14	"Film, Friends and Fruit Pies"	Blake T. Evans	Jana Hunter & Mitch Hunter	February 10, 2016	4X7114	6.85
Axl learns a secret from his boss at Little Betty (Alan Ruck) that affects the regular staff, causing him to stress out. At home, Brick must create a short video for a school project and gives Cindy and Troy the lead roles, then turns tyrannical and replaces them with Frankie and Brad. When Frankie steps on a mysterious piece of plastic, she and Mike try to figure out which household appliance it belongs to. Sue gets a new roommate that she's perfectly compatible with, except financially.
159	15	"Hecks at a Movie"	Lee Shallat Chemel	Ilana Wernick	February 17, 2016	4X7115	7.29
The Hecks give Brick his first movie-theater experience, but the book-lover becomes outraged during the preview for an upcoming film based on the Planet Nowhere series. Meanwhile, Frankie becomes irritated at Mike after he "shushes" her when she interrupts Bill Norwood's story multiple times. In the theatre, Axl and Sean reminisce about their first kisses and the photos that were accidentally deleted from the computer on Christmas Eve return, giving everyone some perspective, and Sue is finally reunited with her crush Logan.
160	16	"The Man Hunt"	Danny Salles	Roy Brown	February 24, 2016	4X7116	7.30
Axl and Hutch move into a motor home they bought at a police auction, but discover few places they may legally park it. Meanwhile, Brick returns from a friend's bar mitzvah and asks Mike about their Protestant family's own rites of passage into manhood.
161	17	"The Wisdom Teeth"	Lee Shallat Chemel	Stacey Pulwer	March 16, 2016	4X7117	7.15
Frankie is excited to take care of Axl and Sue when they get their wisdom teeth removed, and Brick tries to lay down new rules for his siblings while they're home. Mike tries to derail Rusty's ex-wife Marlene from pursuing a lawsuit after Rusty claims that she came up with the idea for their diaper business.
162	18	"A Very Donahue Vacation"	Jaffar Mahmood	Rich Dahm	March 23, 2016	4X7118	7.24
After making a big sale in the diaper business, Mike treats the family to a vacation at Mammoth Cave and Frankie insists that the Donahues come along. Frankie gets a big head when both Nancy and Sean Donahue tell her she's a good mother. Later, the youngest Donahue daughter overhears Frankie calling Nancy "smothering" in a conversation with Mike and uses it to blackmail Frankie. Elsewhere, Axl uses Brick in a game of "jerk/no jerk" to pick up women, and Mike realizes how fast his daughter is growing up when Sue gets an exciting summer opportunity.
163	19	"Crushed"	Lee Shallat Chemel	Tim Hobert	April 6, 2016	4X7119	7.04
Sue develops a huge crush on her professor and tries to get his attention. Frankie, Mike, and Brick go out to dinner with Cindy to meet her parents, who end up asking the Hecks for a substantial loan to save their home.
164	20	"Survey Says..."	Lee Shallat Chemel	Ilana Wernick	April 13, 2016	4X7120	6.98
Learning that Axl wants to quit football, Mike tries his best to dissuade him. Meanwhile, Brick labors over his answers to a customer-satisfaction survey regarding graph paper he bought online. Frankie meets Sue for lunch and meets her new boyfriend Jeremy, and is annoyed by their complaints about everything wrong with the world.
165	21	"The Lanai"	Blake T. Evans	Jana Hunter & Mitch Hunter	April 27, 2016	4X7121	6.72
Frankie is excited when Mike's co-workers build her a lanai, but finds she can't relax on it because new neighbor Dierdre (Emily Rutherfurd) has three noisy, rambunctious children. Brick asks Mike if his "friends" can build him a new bookshelf after they finish the lanai. Mike says that's not fair to his friends, but Brick makes him realize that his co-workers only do nice things for him because he's their boss. Axl and Hutch start a business selling Kenny's grilled cheese sandwiches out of their RV on campus. Sue and Lexie make plans for the next schoolyear when they win the dorm lottery.
166	22	"Not Mother's Day"	Lee Shallat Chemel	Rich Dahm	May 4, 2016	4X7122	7.02
After a man behind her in line pays for her groceries, Frankie vows to pay the good deed forward. Having previously canceled Mother's Day, Frankie makes each member of the family do something nice for another by drawing names from a hat. Naturally, chaos ensues as the Hecks and visiting Pat (Marsha Mason) try to fulfill their promises. Mike fixes Woofy Dog for Sue, but doesn't know how to tell him she doesn't like it. Additionally, Sue temporarily gives her room to Brick for the summer.
167	23	"Find My Hecks"	Phil Traill	Roy Brown	May 11, 2016	4X7123	6.73
Frankie is concerned when Axl and Sue go parties past their curfew after the college year ends, so she and Mike use apps to keep tabs on them. And as middle-school graduation nears, Brick desperately tries to discover who he's up against for class valedictorian.
168	24	"The Show Must Go On"	Lee Shallat Chemel	Tim Hobert	May 18, 2016	4X7124	6.73
After almost forgetting that Brick's middle-school graduation is only days away, Frankie goes on a mission to right a wrong when Brick discovers that the song he was supposed to sing at the ceremony has been cut. Axl takes a job as a country-club day-camp counselor and finds himself being mocked by a 10-year-old carbon copy of himself, while Sue needs to leave for Dollywood on the day of Brick's graduation.

No.	Title	Air date	Rating/share (18–49)	Viewers (millions)	DVR (18–49)	Total (18–49)
1	"Not Your Brother's Drop Off"	September 23, 2015	2.1/8	8.21	0.9	3.0
2	"Cutting the Cord"	September 30, 2015	2.2/8	7.91	—N/a	—N/a
3	"The Shirt"	October 7, 2015	2.0/7	7.30	0.9	2.9
4	"Risky Business"	October 14, 2015	2.0/7	7.12	0.8	2.8
5	"Land of the Lost"	October 21, 2015	1.9/7	7.08	—N/a	—N/a
6	"Halloween VI: Tic Toc Death"	October 28, 2015	2.0/7	7.43	0.8	2.8
7	"Homecoming II: The Tailgate"	November 11, 2015	2.0/7	7.62	—N/a	—N/a
8	"Thanksgiving VII"	November 18, 2015	2.1/7	7.93	0.8	2.9
9	"The Convention"	December 2, 2015	2.0/7	7.64	0.7	2.7
10	"Not So Silent Night"	December 9, 2015	2.0/7	8.06	—N/a	—N/a
11	"The Rush"	January 6, 2016	2.1/7	7.84	0.8	2.9
12	"Birds of a Feather"	January 13, 2016	1.9/7	7.46	0.7	2.6
13	"Floating 50"	January 20, 2016	1.8/6	7.24	0.7	2.5
14	"Film, Friends and Fruit Pies"	February 10, 2016	1.8/7	6.85	0.8	2.6
15	"Hecks at a Movie"	February 17, 2016	1.9/7	7.29	—N/a	—N/a
16	"The Man Hunt"	February 24, 2016	1.9/6	7.30	—N/a	—N/a
17	"The Wisdom Teeth"	March 16, 2016	1.7/7	7.15	0.8	2.5
18	"A Very Donahue Vacation"	March 23, 2016	1.7/7	7.24	0.7	2.4
19	"Crushed"	April 6, 2016	1.7/6	7.04	0.7	2.4
20	"Survey Says..."	April 13, 2016	1.7/6	6.98	0.7	2.4
21	"The Lanai"	April 27, 2016	1.7/6	6.72	TBA	TBA
22	"Not Mother's Day"	May 4, 2016	1.7/6	7.02	TBA	TBA
23	"Find My Hecks"	May 11, 2016	1.6/6	6.73	TBA	TBA
24	"The Show Must Go On"	May 18, 2016	1.6/6	6.73	TBA	TBA
