= Dawg (film) =

- Directed by: Victoria Hochberg
- Written by: Ken Hastings
- Produced by: Stephen J. Cannell
- Starring: Denis Leary; Elizabeth Hurley
- Cinematography: Steven Finestone
- Edited by: Claudia Finkle; Mary Jo Markey
- Music by: Jason Frederick; Amani K. Smith
- Distributed by: Gold Circle Films
- Release date: February 21, 2002
- Running time: 83 minutes
- Country: United States
- Language: English

Dawg is 2002 dramedy film directed by Victoria Hochberg. It stars Denis Leary and Elizabeth Hurley, in their second film together. Steffani Brass was nominated for Young Artist Award for her role in this film. Although intended to be released in theaters under the title Bad Boy, it was ultimately distributed direct-to-video.

== Plot ==
Douglas "Dawg" Munford (Denis Leary) is the ultimate womanizer: he is selfish, rude, and uncaring about what a woman thinks after they have sex. He arrives too late for his grandmother's funeral but finds that she has left him a million dollars, subject to one condition.

As explained by estate executor Anna Lockhart (Elizabeth Hurley), Douglas must contact at least a dozen of the scores of women he has seduced and left during his lifetime and beg for their forgiveness. Reluctantly, Dawg sets out on his odyssey, which takes him and the lawyer to venues throughout California. Later, he falls for Anna.

== Cast ==
- Denis Leary - Douglas "Dawg" Munford
- Elizabeth Hurley - Anna Lockhart
- Nicole Robinson - Megan Riley
- Mia Cottet - Kiana Mortenson
- Julia Murphy - Holly
- Elizabeth Rossa - Jill
- Alice Amter - Donna
- Annie Sorell - Sherri
- Alicia Lorén - Stephanie
- Vanessa Bell Calloway - Christine Hodges
- Elaine Hendrix - Angel
- Steffani Brass - Lindsay Anne Wickman
- Jackie Tohn - Eric Koyle
- Alex Borstein - Darcy Smits
