= The Middle season 6 =

The Middle
- Season 6
- Region 1 DVD cover art
- Starring: Patricia Heaton; Neil Flynn; Charlie McDermott; Eden Sher; Atticus Shaffer
- No. of episodes: 24

Release
- Original network: ABC
- Original release: September 24, 2014 – May 13, 2015

Season chronology
- ← Previous; Season 5 Next → Season 7

The sixth season of the television comedy series The Middle began airing on September 24, 2014, on ABC in the United States. It is produced by Blackie and Blondie Productions and Warner Bros. Television with series creators DeAnn Heline and Eileen Heisler as executive producers.

The show features Frances "Frankie" Heck (Patricia Heaton), a working-class, Midwestern woman married to Mike Heck (Neil Flynn) who resides in the small fictional town of Orson, Indiana. They are the parents of three children, Axl (Charlie McDermott), Sue (Eden Sher), and Brick (Atticus Shaffer).

On May 8, 2014, ABC renewed The Middle for a sixth season. On October 23, 2014, ABC gave the season a full 24-episode order.

== Cast ==
=== Main cast ===
- Patricia Heaton as Frankie Heck
- Neil Flynn as Mike Heck
- Charlie McDermott as Axl Heck
- Eden Sher as Sue Heck
- Atticus Shaffer as Brick Heck

=== Recurring ===
- Brock Ciarlelli as Brad Bottig, one of Sue's ex-boyfriends who is now just a close friend at school. He appears in the following episodes: "Unbraceable You", "The Loneliest Locker", "The Table", "Halloween V", "The College Tour", "A Quarry Story", "Steaming Pile of Guilt", "The Waiting Game", "Siblings and Sombreros", "Food Courting" and "The Graduate".
- Alphonso McAuley as Hutch, Axl's football teammate and best friend at college. He appears in the following episodes: "The Loneliest Locker", "Major Anxiety", "The Table", and "Valentine's Day V".
- John Gammon as Darrin, Axl's friend and Sue's ex-boyfriend and ex-fiancé. The two broke up in the episode "The Answer" due to Sue's unwillingness to marry Darrin. He appears in the following episodes: "Major Anxiety", "The Table", "Thanksgiving VI", "The Christmas Wall", "Valentine's Day V", and "The Answer".
- Casey Burke as Cindy Hornberger, Brick's classmate, with whom he is in the early stages of a relationship. She appears in the following episodes: "Major Anxiety", "Halloween V", "Thanksgiving VI", and "Valentine's Day V".
- Gia Mantegna as Devin Levin, a relative of Frankie's hairdresser who gets set up with Axl. The two end up liking each other and begin dating. She appears in the following episodes: "Thanksgiving VI", "The College Tour", "Pam Freakin' Staggs", "Valentine's Day V", "Steaming Pile of Guilt", "Operation Infiltration", and "The Graduate".

=== Guest cast ===
- Richard Kind as Dr. Niller, Sue's orthodontist. He appears in "Unbraceable You".
- Jimmy Kimmel as himself, the only fan of Brick's podcast about different fonts. He appears in "The Table".
- Jerry Hardin as Old Farmer, who attends Sue's pumpkin-patch film screening and donates $50 to her college fund. He appears in "Halloween V".
- Phyllis Smith as Ms. Huff, Sue's guidance counselor. She appears in "The Sinkhole".
- Kirstie Alley as Pam Staggs, the most popular girl in high school who wouldn't give Frankie a second look back then. She appears in "Pam Freakin' Staggs".
- Brian Doyle-Murray as Don Ehlert, the owner of the car dealership where Frankie used to work and must do so for one more day in order to cash an old paycheck. He appears in "A Quarry Story".
- Jerry Van Dyke as Tag Spence, Frankie's father. He appears in "Flirting With Disaster" & "Two of a Kind".
- Matthew Atkinson as Finn, Axl's friend. He appears in "Flirting with Disaster".
- Dave Foley as Dr. Chuck Fulton, Brick's school therapist. He appears in "Operation Infiltration".
- Norm Macdonald as Rusty Heck, Mike's brother. He appears in "Operation Infiltration".
- Dick Van Dyke as Paul "Dutch" Spence, Frankie's uncle and Tag's older brother. He appears in "Two of a Kind".
- Marsha Mason as Pat Spence, Frankie's mother. She appears in "Mother's Day Reservations".
- French Stewart as Principal Cameron. He appears in "The Graduate".

== Critical reception ==
Early reviews for the sixth season were positive. Will Harris of The A.V. Club stated that it was "not a bad way to start a new season". Robert Bianco of USA Today stated that "it's a strong start for an excellent, underappreciated series".

== Episodes ==
No. overall	No. in season	Title	Directed by	Written by	Original release date	Prod. code	U.S. viewers (millions)
121	1	"Unbraceable You"	Lee Shallat Chemel	Tim Hobert	September 24, 2014	4X6601	7.59
The kids are all ready to start school, but Frankie forgets to check the website, and the kids end up starting school a week late. Meanwhile, Sue finally gets her braces off; Axl finally beats Mike in basketball; and Brick tries to find the perfect backpack for school.
122	2	"The Loneliest Locker"	Blake T. Evans	Jana Hunter & Mitch Hunter	October 1, 2014	4X6602	7.42
Frankie and Mike look for second jobs in order to afford a good college for Sue next year. Sue and Brad write, direct, and star in the senior play, The Loneliest Locker, but Frankie's second job keeps her from the performance. Axl furnishes his and Hutch's new rented house with items he filched from the Hecks' home. Brick finds his noisy, annoying childhood toys that Frankie had deliberately stowed away, and joyfully plays with them.
123	3	"Major Anxiety"	Phil Traill	Rich Dahm	October 8, 2014	4X6603	7.44
Brick informs Frankie and Mike that he would like to go to his middle school's Fall Fantasy Dance. Axl panics after discovering he needs to declare a college major by the end of the week. High school senior Sue becomes edgy after drinking much coffee to appear more mature and sophisticated.
124	4	"The Table"	Lee Shallat Chemel	Roy Brown	October 22, 2014	4X6604	7.29
Frankie and Mike approach their 22nd wedding anniversary. Axl decides that he and Hutch need to renovate their house and find another roommate to help with expenses. Frankie gives the boys the family dining set after she finds a full dining set online for $50, but it ends up being doll furniture. After Darrin presents Sue with a special necklace to proclaim his love, she discovers that he gave the same gift to his former girlfriend. Brick begins a podcast about fonts.
125	5	"Halloween V"	Lee Shallat Chemel	Robin Shorr	October 29, 2014	4X6605	6.99
Frankie and Mike are stunned to learn that Brick has invited a girl to the house just to hang with him. Meanwhile, to help supplement her college fund, Sue arranges a pumpkin-patch screening of It's the Great Pumpkin, Charlie Brown. Axl reluctantly goes to the library to write a history paper and gets locked inside when it closes.
126	6	"The Sinkhole"	Melissa Kosar	Katie Ballard	November 12, 2014	4X6606	8.10
Frankie is forced to wash the dishes with the hose after the kitchen sink falls into a sinkhole after she threw a light spoon in it. Meanwhile, Sue has to master tinikling to receive credit for gym class, upon being told by her guidance counselor (Phyllis Smith) that Wrestlerettes does not qualify for physical education credit. After Brick accidentally breaks Mike's lawn mower, Axl advises him to take his father's wallet, then act like he found it later, thinking this will divert Mike's attention from the broken mower.
127	7	"Thanksgiving VI"	Lee Shallat Chemel	Tim Hobert	November 19, 2014	4X6607	8.32
As their kitchen sink is still in disrepair, the Hecks decide to eat out for Thanksgiving. Brick invites his girlfriend Cindy to join them and desperately tries to win her a stuffed toy in a claw machine. Trying to get Mike to like him, Darrin makes things worse by telling the restaurant that it is Mike's birthday; Frankie forces Axl to invite her hairdresser's relative, Devin Levin.
128	8	"The College Tour"	Blake T. Evans	Rich Dahm	December 3, 2014	4X6608	7.04
Mike attends Sue's college-tour weekend, forcing him to miss the first college football game in which Axl gets to play; and for Frankie to be there, she must leave Brick with various minders who all try to help him complete a school project. But Axl has a forgettable game, causing him to try to avoid Devin Levin, who had also attended.
129	9	"The Christmas Wall"	Lee Shallat Chemel	Roy Brown	December 10, 2014	4X6609	8.11
Feeling unappreciated, Frankie decides on minimalist Christmas decorations then changes her mind last minute; meanwhile, mindful of Sue's allergies, Mike tries to purchase an artificial tree but does not get what he paid for. Axl revives Boss Co. for the holidays, but when he and Sean argue about Rudolph the Red-Nosed Reindeer, Sean, Axl and Darrin's friendship is at stake. Brick attempts to write a Heck family Christmas letter detailing their past year, after seeing the same kind of letter in a card from a family the Hecks hardly know.
130	10	"Pam Freakin' Staggs"	Elliot Hegarty	Jana Hunter & Mitch Hunter	January 7, 2015	4X6611	8.46
Pam Staggs (Kirstie Alley), a popular former classmate of Frankie's who moved to St. Louis after winning $1 million on Wheel of Fortune, looks up Frankie upon returning to town. Frankie is overjoyed at first, but it turns out to be an annoying journey, especially when a drunk Pam tells Frankie she only contacted her because all her "real" friends left Orson. Sue attempts to do many things, like playing the oboe and rowing, hoping to work something into a college scholarship. Axl keeps pestering and annoying Devin Levin, then faces off with her in some sports in hopes of "winning" another date with her.
131	11	"A Quarry Story"	Clare Kilner	Ilana Wernick	January 14, 2015	4X6610	7.79
Having had her hours cut back at Spudsy's, Sue gets a janitorial job at the quarry, but inadvertently starts a party with a picture posted online. When it turns chaotic and explosives endanger the partiers, Mike finds out about it and yells at Sue when they get home, causing her to cry. He then grounds her for six weeks for breaking his trust. Brick quizzes the Hecks with scenarios from various game shows including Match Game and The Price Is Right. Big Mike supplies a new sink, which he recruits Axl to help install. Frankie finds an expired check from the car dealership, which Mr. Ehlert will not pay unless she gives him a day's work; her uncaring attitude during this mandatory workday surprisingly nets her two commissions.
132	12	"Hecks on a Train"	Lee Shallat Chemel	Tim Hobert	February 4, 2015	4X6612	8.26
After learning that Aunt Edie has died, the Hecks board a train with the body to take her to her final resting place in South Dakota. Along the way, Frankie accuses Mike of not being caring or nurturing after she trips in the dining car and another man assists her. Axl believes he caused Aunt Edie's death because he had used the excuse of her dying numerous times to get extensions on school assignments. Brick makes a questionable new friend on the journey. Sue worries she will not get accepted at any colleges after accidentally sending out a draft of her personal essay, only for Axl to become furious when he discovers she applied to East Indiana State.
133	13	"Valentine's Day VI"	Lee Shallat Chemel	Rich Dahm	February 11, 2015	4X6615	7.82
Frankie encourages Brick to ask Cindy out for ice cream on Valentine's Day; he does, then panics when Cindy requests a kiss at the end of the date. Devin Levin forbids Axl to get her a Valentine's gift because she claims to hate the holiday, but unsure if she actually does want something, he compromises by planning a special "National Radio Day" celebration on February 13. Meanwhile, Darrin plans a special Valentine's scavenger hunt for Sue that ends at a tiny house he says he bought for them. Then he proposes, complete with a ring.
134	14	"The Answer"	Phil Traill	Tim Hobert	February 18, 2015	4X6616	7.70
Boasting of his new relationship status with Cindy, Brick vows to end his "whoops" and "whispers". Axl returns from his date with Devin and claims he can fix Brick's quirks, based on what he's learned in his psychology class. During dinner, Sue reveals she panicked and said "sure" to marrying Darrin. Mike angrily says he is going to kill Darrin, but Sue intervenes and says she needs to handle it. Meanwhile, Axl tries out several different methods to cure Brick, and ultimately isolates the issues to the lawn chair Brick was forced to sit in at the dinner table. After several failed attempts, Sue finally tells Darrin she has many other things she wants to do before getting married, and breaks off their engagement.
135	15	"Steaming Pile of Guilt"	Lee Shallat Chemel	Robin Shorr	February 25, 2015	4X6613	7.47
Frankie and Mike realize they forgot Brick's birthday—in November. Frankie tries to make it up to Brick by giving him a day to do anything he wants, but she and the other family members regret that decision. Sue tries desperately to win a "Best" award for the Orson High yearbook. Axl learns that Weird Ashley has transferred to East Indiana State. When Devin sees how Axl has nicknamed Ashley, herself, and other women in his cellphone contacts, she breaks up with him, but they later reconcile.
136	16	"Flirting with Disaster"	Phil Traill	Roy Brown	March 4, 2015	4X6614	8.20
Axl brings his friend Finn to the house, and Finn compliments Frankie's outfit. Frankie flirts back and later talks to a friend on her cellphone about Axl's "hot friend" hitting on her—then realizes that Axl and Finn might be hearing this conversation over the Bluetooth device Mike had just installed in the car. Sue reluctantly takes Brick to a Planet Nowhere convention in Indianapolis when nobody else can drive him, but by the end of the day she is glad she did. Elsewhere, Mike is helping Tag prepare for a road test to keep his driver's license when he realizes that Tag should not be driving anymore.
137	17	"The Waiting Game"	Danny Salles	Katy Ballard	March 25, 2015	4X6618	7.34
Sue is regularly checking her email to see if any colleges have accepted her, and is getting nervous because most of her friends have gotten acceptance letters already. She tries to distract herself by making potpourri sachets to give to her classmates, but Frankie remains on pins and needles. Meanwhile, Brick has decided he wants to write a novel. After taking days to write the perfect opening sentence, he gives up, feeling like no follow-up sentence could measure up. Elsewhere, Mike continuously denies singing in the car, despite there being multiple witnesses.
138	18	"Operation Infiltration"	Melissa Kosar	Ilana Wernick	April 1, 2015	4X6619	7.64
Frankie helps chaperone Brick's school field trip, mainly to force some of his classmates to be friends with him. Meanwhile, Mike and his brother Rusty are trying to clean out some of their hoarder father's junk while he is out of town. While reminiscing in their old bedroom, Mike realizes he picked on Rusty quite a bit when they were younger, and he thinks this may be the reason that Rusty has no ambition in life. Elsewhere, after being scolded by Devin Levin for being mean to Sue, Axl tries to make it look like he and Sue are very best friends when Sue spends the weekend at his college.
139	19	"Siblings and Sombreros"	Melissa Kosar	Jana Hunter & Mitch Hunter	April 8, 2015	4X6617	7.28
Sue lashes out at Axl when he forgets to bring home a sombrero that she wants to wear in a yearbook photo with Brad, and Axl lashes back about Sue constantly harassing him. Frankie gets between them, confiding in Axl that Sue can be "relentless" and telling Sue that Axl can be a "jackass". When the two find out about Frankie's meddling, they turn their frustration to their mother and actually bond over it. Elsewhere, Mike is shocked when Brick wins an Athlete of the Month award at school, and thinks he still has a chance to develop Brick's skills at a sport...but another kid was mistaken for Brick after the two exchanged shorts.
140	20	"Food Courting"	Blake T. Evans	Jana Hunter & Mitch Hunter	April 15, 2015	4X6620	7.52
When Axl is celebrating his milestone 21st birthday at college, Mike forces him to come home to help move a freezer. Mike had actually used the freezer as an excuse to get Axl home so father and 21-year-old son could go out for a beer, but after an argument he refuses to take Axl to the bar. Axl goes by himself and the clerk gives him a hard time until Mike confirms his age, and they finally have a beer together. Brick seems to be turning into the new Teenage Axl with a bad attitude, and after punishing him constantly, Frankie finally issues a challenge. Elsewhere, Sue is tempted by a rival food court chain to leave Spudsy's, until Brad convinces her to take a job at his food stand.
141	21	"Two of a Kind"	Danny Salles	Tim Hobert	April 22, 2015	4X6621	7.82
Frankie's father Tag and his brother, her Uncle Dutch (Dick Van Dyke), get into a feud and she and Mike try to resolve it. Meanwhile, Sue gets her first detention and enlists Axl's help for surviving it and possibly keeping it from their parents.
142	22	"While You Were Sleeping"	Blake T. Evans	Roy Brown	April 29, 2015	4X6622	7.39
Sue is depressed that she will not be going to prom now that Darrin is no longer her boyfriend. A handsome man from another school who works in the same mall as Sue offers to take her, but she can't find anyone to cover her shift at Spudsy's. They cannot seem to make things work until the young man says he was not just being nice: he really likes Sue. Elsewhere, Axl and Brick start a business together, and Mike and Frankie try to rent movies for their "date night" but keep falling asleep during the movies.
143	23	"Mother's Day Reservations"	Lee Shallat Chemel	Rich Dahm	May 6, 2015	4X6623	6.99
In search of a Mother's Day gift that Frankie might actually enjoy, Mike makes reservations for an afternoon tea with the family and Frankie's mom, Pat, but it is clearly not what anyone wants. Meanwhile, Frankie is again disappointed with the gifts her children give her, until she talks to someone from the store who says the kids spent hours there trying to find the perfect present.
144	24	"The Graduate"	Eileen Heisler	Eileen Heisler & DeAnn Heline	May 13, 2015	4X6624	7.03
Due to errors in her yearbook, being denied her perfect attendance cords, and numerous other incidents, Sue is distraught that she will not be leaving behind any "footprint" at Orson High. But the entire senior class comes through with a huge surprise at her graduation: every single page in Sue's yearbook is signed, with compliments and well-wishes for her. Meanwhile, Axl worries about Devin going back to Idaho for the summer, especially when he sees a photo on a social site (Instagram) where she is being held by other guys. Devin comes to Indiana to surprise Axl and explains that the guys in the photo were her brothers. Also, Brick learns that he has an opportunity to skip eighth grade next year and go directly to high school, leaving Frankie and Mike wondering if their youngest son is mature enough for high school.

== Ratings ==
No.	Title	Air date	Rating/Share (18–49)	Viewers (million)	Reference
1	"Unbraceable You"	September 24, 2014	2.2/8	7.59	
2	"The Lonliest Locker"	October 1, 2014	2.0/7	7.42	
3	"Major Anxiety"	October 8, 2014	2.0/7	7.44	
4	"The Table"	October 22, 2014	2.1/7	7.29	
5	"Halloween V"	October 29, 2014	1.8/6	6.99	
6	"The Sinkhole"	November 12, 2014	1.9/6	8.10	
7	"Thanksgiving VI"	November 19, 2014	2.2/7	8.32	
8	"The College Tour"	December 3, 2014	1.6/5	7.04	
9	"The Christmas Wall"	December 10, 2014	2.2/7	8.11	
10	"Pam Freakin' Staggs"	January 7, 2015	2.3/7	8.46	
11	"A Quarry Story"	January 14, 2015	2.2/7	7.79	
12	"Hecks On A Train"	February 4, 2015	2.2/8	8.26	
13	"Valentine's Day VI"	February 11, 2015	2.1/7	7.82	
14	"The Answer"	February 18, 2015	2.2/7	7.70	
15	"Steaming Pile of Guilt"	February 25, 2015	2.0/7	7.47	
16	"Flirting With Disaster"	March 4, 2015	2.2/7	8.20	
17	"The Waiting Game"	March 25, 2015	1.9/7	7.34	
18	"Operation Infiltration"	April 1, 2015	1.8/6	7.64	
19	"Siblings and Sombreros"	April 8, 2015	1.9/7	7.28	
20	"Food Courting"	April 15, 2015	2.0/6	7.52	
21	"Two of a Kind"	April 22, 2015	1.8/6	7.82	
22	"While You Were Sleeping"	April 29, 2015	2.0/8	7.39	
23	"Mother's Day Reservations"	May 6, 2015	1.7/6	6.99	
24	"The Graduate"	May 13, 2015	1.8/7	7.03	
