= Kenya (given name) =

Kenya is a given name. It is considered to be an African-American name in the United States. Notable people with the name include:

- Kenya Barris (born 1974), American writer
- Kenya Bell (born 1977), American singer
- Kenya Charles, Trinidad and Tobago politician
- Kenya Hathaway, American singer
- Kenya Moore (born 1971), American actress
- Kenya Mori (born 1976), Mexican actress
- Kenya (Robinson) (born 1977), American artist
- Kenya D. Williamson, American writer
