= List of The Middle episodes =

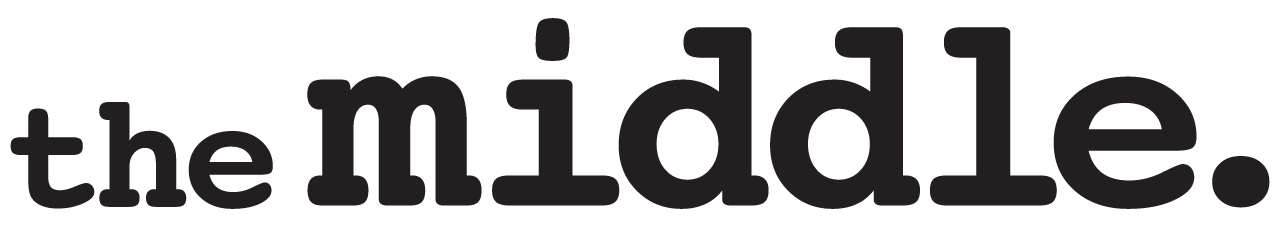

The Middle is an American sitcom created by DeAnn Heline and Eileen Heisler for the ABC network. The Middle stars Patricia Heaton and Neil Flynn as Frankie and Mike Heck, a used-car saleswoman and the manager of a small mining firm respectively, who struggle to raise their children in the fictional middle-class town of Orson, Indiana. Their three children include the athletic but underachieving, slow-witted Axl (Charlie McDermott), cluelessly unpopular daughter Sue (Eden Sher), and frustrated, odd child-genius Brick (Atticus Shaffer). The Hecks find themselves embroiled in somewhat unusual events as they attempt to navigate their day-to-day lives. The series was met with a positive reception from television critics when it premiered on September 30, 2009, with a score of 70 on the aggregated reviews website Metacritic. On March 3, 2016, ABC renewed the series for an eighth season. On January 25, 2017, ABC renewed the series for a ninth season, later announced to be the show's last.

During the course of the series, 215 episodes of The Middle aired over nine seasons.

== Series overview ==
Season	Episodes	Originally released	
Season	Episodes	First released	Last released
1	24	September 30, 2009	May 19, 2010
2	24	September 22, 2010	May 25, 2011
3	24	September 21, 2011	May 23, 2012
4	24	September 26, 2012	May 22, 2013
5	24	September 25, 2013	May 21, 2014
6	24	September 24, 2014	May 13, 2015
7	24	September 23, 2015	May 18, 2016
8	23	October 11, 2016	May 16, 2017
9	24	October 3, 2017	May 22, 2018

== Episodes ==
=== Season 1 (2009–10) ===
No. overall	No. in season	Title	Directed by	Written by	Original release date	Prod. code	U.S. viewers (millions)
1	1	"Pilot"	Julie Anne Robinson	DeAnn Heline & Eileen Heisler	September 30, 2009	276047	8.71
2	2	"The Cheerleader"	Lee Shallat Chemel	DeAnn Heline & Eileen Heisler	October 7, 2009	3X5701	6.79
3	3	"The Floating Anniversary"	Gail Mancuso	Rob Ulin	October 14, 2009	3X5703	6.77
4	4	"The Trip"	Lee Shallat Chemel	Jana Hunter & Mitch Hunter	October 21, 2009	3X5704	6.53
5	5	"The Block Party"	Ken Whittingham	Alex Reid	October 28, 2009	3X5702	6.49
6	6	"The Front Door"	Michael Spiller	Russ Woody	November 4, 2009	3X5705	6.04
7	7	"The Scratch"	Wendey Stanzler & Alex Reid	DeAnn Heline & Eileen Heisler	November 18, 2009	3X5707	7.06
8	8	"Thanksgiving"	Michael Spiller	Vijal Patel	November 25, 2009	3X5706	5.94
9	9	"Siblings"	Barnet Kellman	Rob Ulin	December 2, 2009	3X5709	6.19
10	10	"Christmas"	Reginald Hudlin	Roy Brown	December 9, 2009	3X5708	7.69
11	11	"The Jeans"	Jamie Babbit	Jana Hunter & Mitch Hunter	January 6, 2010	3X5710	7.37
12	12	"The Neighbor"	Lee Shallat Chemel	Jana Hunter & Mitch Hunter	January 6, 2010	3X5712	8.07
13	13	"The Interview"	Ken Whittingham	Vijal Patel	January 13, 2010	3X5711	5.95
14	14	"The Yelling"	Elliot Hegarty	Rob Ulin	February 3, 2010	3X5713	7.32
15	15	"Valentine's Day"	Chris Koch	Bruce Rasmussen	February 10, 2010	3X5714	7.83
16	16	"The Bee"	Ken Whittingham	Eileen Heisler & DeAnn Heline	March 3, 2010	3X5717	5.89
17	17	"The Break-Up"	Wendey Stanzler	Vijal Patel	March 10, 2010	3X5715	6.30
18	18	"The Fun House"	Chris Koch	Roy Brown	March 24, 2010	3X5716	7.16
19	19	"The Final Four"	Alex Reid	Rob Ulin	March 31, 2010	3X5719	6.23
20	20	"TV or Not TV"	Lee Shallat Chemel	Vijal Patel	April 14, 2010	3X5718	6.70
21	21	"Worry Duty"	Lee Shallat Chemel	Bruce Rasmussen	April 28, 2010	3X5720	7.10
22	22	"Mother's Day"	Barnet Kellman	Mitch Hunter & Jana Hunter	May 5, 2010	3X5721	6.75
23	23	"Signals"	Jamie Babbit	DeAnn Heline & Eileen Heisler	May 12, 2010	3X5722	7.49
24	24	"Average Rules"	Wendey Stanzler	DeAnn Heline & Eileen Heisler	May 19, 2010	3X5723	7.56

=== Season 2 (2010–11) ===
No. overall	No. in season	Title	Directed by	Written by	Original release date	Prod. code	U.S. viewers (millions)
25	1	"Back to School"	Wendey Stanzler	DeAnn Heline & Eileen Heisler	September 22, 2010	3X6501	8.80
26	2	"Homecoming"	Ken Whittingham	Rob Ulin	September 29, 2010	3X6502	8.35
27	3	"The Diaper Incident"	Wendey Stanzler	Vijal Patel	October 6, 2010	3X6503	8.03
28	4	"The Quarry"	Lee Shallat Chemel	Alex Reid	October 13, 2010	3X6505	7.98
29	5	"Foreign Exchange"	Paul Lazarus	Jana Hunter & Mitch Hunter	October 20, 2010	3X6506	8.54
30	6	"Halloween"	Jamie Babbit	Roy Brown	October 27, 2010	3X6507	9.54
31	7	"A Birthday Story"	Ken Whittingham	Vijal Patel	November 3, 2010	3X6508	9.42
32	8	"Errand Boy"	Lee Shallat Chemel	Tim Hobert	November 17, 2010	3X6509	9.29
33	9	"Thanksgiving II"	Ken Whittingham	Rob Ulin	November 24, 2010	3X6504	8.25
34	10	"A Simple Christmas"	Elliot Hegarty	Mitch Hunter & Jana Hunter	December 8, 2010	3X6510	8.68
35	11	"Taking Back the House"	Barnet Kellman	DeAnn Heline & Eileen Heisler	January 5, 2011	3X6511	9.31
36	12	"The Big Chill"	Lee Shallat Chemel	Rob Ulin	January 12, 2011	3X6512	10.09
37	13	"Super Sunday"	Paul Lazarus	Vijal Patel	January 19, 2011	3X6513	8.32
38	14	"Valentine's Day II"	Lee Shallat Chemel	Roy Brown	February 9, 2011	3X6515	8.84
39	15	"Friends, Lies and Videotape"	Alex Reid	Tim Hobert	February 16, 2011	3X6514	7.85
40	16	"Hecks on a Plane"	Elliot Hegarty	DeAnn Heline & Eileen Heisler	February 23, 2011	3X6516	7.96
41	17	"The Math Class"	Alex Reid	Jana Hunter & Mitch Hunter	March 2, 2011	3X6517	7.86
42	18	"Spring Cleaning"	Barnet Kellman	Vijal Patel	March 23, 2011	3X6518	7.05
43	19	"The Legacy"	Adam Davidson	Rob Ulin	April 13, 2011	3X6519	6.14
44	20	"Royal Wedding"	Ken Whittingham	Vijal Patel	April 20, 2011	3X6520	6.82
45	21	"Mother's Day II"	Lee Shallat Chemel	Tim Hobert	May 4, 2011	3X6521	7.08
46	22	"The Prom"	Ken Whittingham	Michael Saltzman	May 11, 2011	3X6522	7.25
47	23	"The Bridge"	Lee Shallat Chemel	Roy Brown	May 18, 2011	3X6523	7.68
48	24	"Back to Summer"	Ken Whittingham	DeAnn Heline & Eileen Heisler	May 25, 2011	3X6524	7.33

=== Season 3 (2011–12) ===
No. overall	No. in season	Title	Directed by	Written by	Original release date	Prod. code	U.S. viewers (millions)
49	1	"Forced Family Fun"	Lee Shallat Chemel	Vijal Patel	September 21, 2011	3X6901	9.74
50	2	"Forced Family Fun"	Ken Whittingham	Vijal Patel	September 21, 2011	3X6902	9.74
51	3	"Hecking Order"	Elliot Hegarty	Roy Brown	September 28, 2011	3X6903	8.68
52	4	"Major Changes"	Lee Shallat Chemel	Eileen Heisler & DeAnn Heline	October 5, 2011	3X6904	9.13
53	5	"The Test"	Elliot Hegarty	Tim Hobert	October 12, 2011	3X6905	8.87
54	6	"Bad Choices"	Lee Shallat Chemel	Jana Hunter & Mitch Hunter	October 19, 2011	3X6906	9.13
55	7	"Halloween II"	Elliot Hegarty	David S. Rosenthal	October 26, 2011	3X6907	10.16
56	8	"Heck's Best Thing"	Lee Shallat Chemel	Vijal Patel	November 2, 2011	3X6908	9.41
57	9	"The Play"	Eyal Gordin	Story by : Roy Brown & Jana Hunter & Mitch Hunter; Teleplay by : Roy Brown	November 16, 2011	3X6909	9.19
58	10	"Thanksgiving III"	Elliot Hegarty	Tim Hobert	November 23, 2011	3X6910	9.08
59	11	"A Christmas Gift"	Blake Evans	Jana Hunter & Mitch Hunter	December 7, 2011	3X6911	8.72
60	12	"Year of the Hecks"	Elliot Hegarty	David S. Rosenthal	January 4, 2012	3X6912	9.99
61	13	"The Map"	Lee Shallat Chemel	DeAnn Heline & Eileen Heisler	January 11, 2012	3X6913	9.45
62	14	"Hecking It Up"	Blake T. Evans	Vijal Patel	January 18, 2012	3X6914	8.08
63	15	"Valentine's Day III"	Lee Shallat Chemel	Jana Hunter & Mitch Hunter	February 8, 2012	3X6915	8.44
64	16	"The Concert"	Phil Traill	Roy Brown	February 15, 2012	3X6916	8.04
65	17	"The Sit Down"	Lee Shallat Chemel	Tim Hobert	February 22, 2012	3X6917	7.48
66	18	"Leap Year"	Alex Hardcastle	David S. Rosenthal	February 29, 2012	3X6918	8.23
67	19	"The Paper Route"	Lee Shallat Chemel	Jack Burditt	March 14, 2012	3X6919	6.93
68	20	"Get Your Business Done"	Blake T. Evans	Vijal Patel	April 11, 2012	3X6920	7.06
69	21	"The Guidance Counselor"	Lee Shallat Chemel	Jana Hunter & Mitch Hunter	May 2, 2012	3X6921	6.63
70	22	"The Clover"	Phil Traill	Roy Brown	May 9, 2012	3X6922	6.60
71	23	"The Telling"	Lee Shallat Chemel	Tim Hobert	May 16, 2012	3X6923	6.53
72	24	"The Wedding"	Phil Traill	Vijal Patel	May 23, 2012	3X6924	6.52

=== Season 4 (2012–13) ===
No. overall	No. in season	Title	Directed by	Written by	Original release date	Prod. code	U.S. viewers (millions)
73	1	"Last Whiff of Summer"	Lee Shallat Chemel	Eileen Heisler & DeAnn Heline	September 26, 2012	3X7451	9.16
74	2	"Last Whiff of Summer"	Lee Shallat Chemel	Eileen Heisler & DeAnn Heline	September 26, 2012	3X7452	9.16
75	3	"The Second Act"	Blake T. Evans	Tim Hobert	October 3, 2012	3X7453	7.72
76	4	"Bunny Therapy"	Elliot Hegarty	Jana Hunter & Mitch Hunter	October 10, 2012	3X7454	7.90
77	5	"The Hose"	Lee Shallat Chemel	Stacey Pulwer	October 17, 2012	3X7455	8.39
78	6	"Halloween III: The Driving"	Phil Traill	Roy Brown	October 24, 2012	3X7456	8.80
79	7	"The Safe"	Lee Shallat Chemel	Robin Shorr	November 7, 2012	3X7457	9.04
80	8	"Thanksgiving IV"	Blake T. Evans	Tim Hobert	November 14, 2012	3X7459	8.79
81	9	"Christmas Help"	Phil Traill	Jana Hunter & Mitch Hunter	December 5, 2012	3X7460	7.98
82	10	"Twenty Years"	Phil Traill	David S. Rosenthal	December 12, 2012	3X7458	7.29
83	11	"Life Skills"	Lee Shallat Chemel	Roy Brown	January 9, 2013	3X7461	8.39
84	12	"One Kid at a Time"	Elliot Hegarty	David S. Rosenthal	January 16, 2013	3X7462	8.21
85	13	"The Friend"	Lee Shallat Chemel	Robin Shorr	January 23, 2013	3X7463	8.55
86	14	"The Smile"	Elliot Hegarty	Tim Hobert	February 6, 2013	3X7464	8.21
87	15	"Valentine's Day IV"	Phil Traill	Jana Hunter & Mitch Hunter	February 13, 2013	3X7465	7.72
88	16	"Winners and Losers"	John Putch	David S. Rosenthal	February 20, 2013	3X7466	8.27
89	17	"Wheel of Pain"	Lee Shallat Chemel	Michael Saltzman	February 27, 2013	3X7467	7.97
90	18	"The Name"	Alex Hardcastle	Roy Brown	March 27, 2013	3X7468	6.90
91	19	"The Bachelor"	Lee Shallat Chemel	Tim Hobert	April 3, 2013	3X7469	7.22
92	20	"Dollar Days"	Phil Traill	Jana Hunter & Mitch Hunter	April 10, 2013	3X7470	7.55
93	21	"From Orson with Love"	Lee Shallat Chemel	Robin Shorr	May 1, 2013	3X7471	7.41
94	22	"Hallelujah Hoedown"	Blake T. Evans	David S. Rosenthal	May 8, 2013	3X7472	6.80
95	23	"The Ditch"	Lee Shallat Chemel	Roy Brown	May 15, 2013	3X7473	6.76
96	24	"The Graduation"	Eileen Heisler	Tim Hobert	May 22, 2013	3X7474	7.70

=== Season 5 (2013–14) ===
No. overall	No. in season	Title	Directed by	Written by	Original release date	Prod. code	U.S. viewers (millions)
97	1	"The Drop Off"	Lee Shallat Chemel	DeAnn Heline & Eileen Heisler	September 25, 2013	4X5501	8.94
98	2	"Change in the Air"	Blake T. Evans	Jana Hunter & Mitch Hunter	October 2, 2013	4X5502	8.03
99	3	"The Potato"	Lee Shallat Chemel	Tim Hobert	October 9, 2013	4X5503	8.25
100	4	"The 100th"	Blake T. Evans	David S. Rosenthal	October 23, 2013	4X5504	8.31
101	5	"Halloween IV: The Ghost Story"	Lee Shallat Chemel	Roy Brown	October 30, 2013	4X5505	8.03
102	6	"The Jump"	Elliot Hegarty	Robin Shorr	November 13, 2013	4X5508	8.93
103	7	"Thanksgiving V"	Lee Shallat Chemel	David S. Rosenthal	November 20, 2013	4X5507	8.53
104	8	"The Kiss"	Elliot Hegarty	Jana Hunter & Mitch Hunter	December 4, 2013	4X5506	7.41
105	9	"The Christmas Tree"	Lee Shallat Chemel	Tim Hobert	December 11, 2013	4X5509	8.08
106	10	"Sleepless in Orson"	Blake T. Evans	Roy Brown	January 8, 2014	4X5510	8.82
107	11	"War of the Hecks"	Lee Shallat Chemel	Robin Shorr	January 15, 2014	4X5511	7.51
108	12	"The Carpool"	Julie Anne Robinson	Jana Hunter & Mitch Hunter	January 22, 2014	4X5512	8.04
109	13	"Hungry Games"	Lee Shallat Chemel	David S. Rosenthal	February 5, 2014	4X5513	8.56
110	14	"The Award"	Phil Traill	Katy Ballard	February 26, 2014	4X5514	6.98
111	15	"Vacation Days"	Phil Traill	Tim Hobert	March 5, 2014	4X5515	7.32
112	16	"Stormy Moon"	John Putch	Robin Shorr	March 12, 2014	4X5516	7.48
113	17	"The Walk"	Lee Shallat Chemel	David S. Rosenthal	March 26, 2014	4X5517	7.28
114	18	"The Smell"	Phil Traill	Roy Brown	April 2, 2014	4X5518	7.20
115	19	"The Wind Chimes"	Lee Shallat Chemel	Jana Hunter & Mitch Hunter	April 23, 2014	4X5519	7.19
116	20	"The Optimist"	Lee Shallat Chemel	Tim Hobert	April 30, 2014	4X5520	7.39
117	21	"Office Hours"	Lee Shallat Chemel	Ben Adams	May 7, 2014	4X5521	6.65
118	22	"Heck on a Hard Body"	Blake T. Evans	Jana Hunter & Mitch Hunter	May 14, 2014	4X5522	7.14
119	23	"Orlando"	Eileen Heisler	David S. Rosenthal	May 21, 2014	4X5523	7.85
120	24	"The Wonderful World of Hecks"	Lee Shallat Chemel	Tim Hobert	May 21, 2014	4X5524	7.85

=== Season 6 (2014–15) ===
No. overall	No. in season	Title	Directed by	Written by	Original release date	Prod. code	U.S. viewers (millions)
121	1	"Unbraceable You"	Lee Shallat Chemel	Tim Hobert	September 24, 2014	4X6601	7.59
122	2	"The Loneliest Locker"	Blake T. Evans	Jana Hunter & Mitch Hunter	October 1, 2014	4X6602	7.42
123	3	"Major Anxiety"	Phil Traill	Rich Dahm	October 8, 2014	4X6603	7.44
124	4	"The Table"	Lee Shallat Chemel	Roy Brown	October 22, 2014	4X6604	7.29
125	5	"Halloween V"	Lee Shallat Chemel	Robin Shorr	October 29, 2014	4X6605	6.99
126	6	"The Sinkhole"	Melissa Kosar	Katie Ballard	November 12, 2014	4X6606	8.10
127	7	"Thanksgiving VI"	Lee Shallat Chemel	Tim Hobert	November 19, 2014	4X6607	8.32
128	8	"The College Tour"	Blake T. Evans	Rich Dahm	December 3, 2014	4X6608	7.04
129	9	"The Christmas Wall"	Lee Shallat Chemel	Roy Brown	December 10, 2014	4X6609	8.11
130	10	"Pam Freakin' Staggs"	Elliot Hegarty	Jana Hunter & Mitch Hunter	January 7, 2015	4X6611	8.46
131	11	"A Quarry Story"	Clare Kilner	Ilana Wernick	January 14, 2015	4X6610	7.79
132	12	"Hecks on a Train"	Lee Shallat Chemel	Tim Hobert	February 4, 2015	4X6612	8.26
133	13	"Valentine's Day VI"	Lee Shallat Chemel	Rich Dahm	February 11, 2015	4X6615	7.82
134	14	"The Answer"	Phil Traill	Tim Hobert	February 18, 2015	4X6616	7.70
135	15	"Steaming Pile of Guilt"	Lee Shallat Chemel	Robin Shorr	February 25, 2015	4X6613	7.47
136	16	"Flirting with Disaster"	Phil Traill	Roy Brown	March 4, 2015	4X6614	8.20
137	17	"The Waiting Game"	Danny Salles	Katy Ballard	March 25, 2015	4X6618	7.34
138	18	"Operation Infiltration"	Melissa Kosar	Ilana Wernick	April 1, 2015	4X6619	7.64
139	19	"Siblings and Sombreros"	Melissa Kosar	Jana Hunter & Mitch Hunter	April 8, 2015	4X6617	7.28
140	20	"Food Courting"	Blake T. Evans	Jana Hunter & Mitch Hunter	April 15, 2015	4X6620	7.52
141	21	"Two of a Kind"	Danny Salles	Tim Hobert	April 22, 2015	4X6621	7.82
142	22	"While You Were Sleeping"	Blake T. Evans	Roy Brown	April 29, 2015	4X6622	7.39
143	23	"Mother's Day Reservations"	Lee Shallat Chemel	Rich Dahm	May 6, 2015	4X6623	6.99
144	24	"The Graduate"	Eileen Heisler	Eileen Heisler & DeAnn Heline	May 13, 2015	4X6624	7.03

=== Season 7 (2015–16) ===
No. overall	No. in season	Title	Directed by	Written by	Original release date	Prod. code	U.S. viewers (millions)
145	1	"Not Your Brother's Drop Off"	Lee Shallat Chemel	Tim Hobert	September 23, 2015	4X7101	8.21
146	2	"Cutting the Cord"	Danny Salles	Rich Dahm	September 30, 2015	4X7102	7.91
147	3	"The Shirt"	Lee Shallat Chemel	Jana Hunter & Mitch Hunter	October 7, 2015	4X7103	7.30
148	4	"Risky Business"	Phil Traill	Ilana Wernick	October 14, 2015	4X7104	7.12
149	5	"Land of the Lost"	Lee Shallat Chemel	Roy Brown	October 21, 2015	4X7105	7.08
150	6	"Halloween VI: Tick Tock Death"	Elliot Hegarty	Tim Hobert	October 28, 2015	4X7106	7.43
151	7	"Homecoming II: The Tailgate"	Lee Shallat Chemel	Ilana Wernick	November 11, 2015	4X7107	7.62
152	8	"Thanksgiving VII"	Elliot Hegarty	Rich Dahm	November 18, 2015	4X7108	7.93
153	9	"The Convention"	Lee Shallat Chemel	Jana Hunter & Mitch Hunter	December 2, 2015	4X7109	7.64
154	10	"Not So Silent Night"	Melissa Kosar	DeAnn Heline & Eileen Heisler	December 9, 2015	4X7110	8.06
155	11	"The Rush"	Lee Shallat Chemel	Roy Brown	January 6, 2016	4X7111	7.84
156	12	"Birds of a Feather"	Victor Nelli	Tim Hobert	January 13, 2016	4X7112	7.46
157	13	"Floating 50"	Lee Shallat Chemel	Rich Dahm	January 20, 2016	4X7113	7.24
158	14	"Film, Friends and Fruit Pies"	Blake T. Evans	Jana Hunter & Mitch Hunter	February 10, 2016	4X7114	6.85
159	15	"Hecks at a Movie"	Lee Shallat Chemel	Ilana Wernick	February 17, 2016	4X7115	7.29
160	16	"The Man Hunt"	Danny Salles	Roy Brown	February 24, 2016	4X7116	7.30
161	17	"The Wisdom Teeth"	Lee Shallat Chemel	Stacey Pulwer	March 16, 2016	4X7117	7.15
162	18	"A Very Donahue Vacation"	Jaffar Mahmood	Rich Dahm	March 23, 2016	4X7118	7.24
163	19	"Crushed"	Lee Shallat Chemel	Tim Hobert	April 6, 2016	4X7119	7.04
164	20	"Survey Says..."	Lee Shallat Chemel	Ilana Wernick	April 13, 2016	4X7120	6.98
165	21	"The Lanai"	Blake T. Evans	Jana Hunter & Mitch Hunter	April 27, 2016	4X7121	6.72
166	22	"Not Mother's Day"	Lee Shallat Chemel	Rich Dahm	May 4, 2016	4X7122	7.02
167	23	"Find My Hecks"	Phil Traill	Roy Brown	May 11, 2016	4X7123	6.73
168	24	"The Show Must Go On"	Lee Shallat Chemel	Tim Hobert	May 18, 2016	4X7124	6.73

=== Season 8 (2016–17) ===
No. overall	No. in season	Title	Directed by	Written by	Original release date (Note: The first 12 episodes of season eight were broadcast one day earlier in Canada.)	Prod. code	U.S. viewers (millions)
169	1	"The Core Group"	Lee Shallat Chemel	Ilana Wernick	October 11, 2016	T12.15251	6.78
170	2	"A Tough Pill to Swallow"	Phil Traill	Rich Dahm	October 18, 2016	T12.15252	6.02
171	3	"Halloween VII: The Heckoning"	Lee Shallat Chemel	Tim Hobert	October 25, 2016	T12.15253	5.72
172	4	"True Grit"	Victor Nelli Jr.	Jana Hunter & Mitch Hunter	November 1, 2016	T12.15254	5.43
173	5	"Roadkill"	Lee Shallat Chemel	Roy Brown	November 15, 2016	T12.15255	6.21
174	6	"Thanksgiving VIII"	Elliot Hegarty	Ilana Wernick	November 22, 2016	T12.15256	6.88
175	7	"Look Who's Not Talking"	Lee Shallat Chemel	Tim Hobert	November 29, 2016	T12.15257	6.62
176	8	"Trip and Fall"	Elliot Hegarty	Rich Dahm	December 6, 2016	T12.15258	6.06
177	9	"A Very Marry Christmas"	Lee Shallat Chemel	Jana Hunter & Mitch Hunter	December 13, 2016	T12.15259	6.39
178	10	"Escape Orson"	Jaffar Mahmood	Roy Brown	January 3, 2017	T12.15260	6.62
179	11	"Hoosier Maid"	Elliot Hegarty	Bruce Rasmussen	January 10, 2017	T12.15261	7.30
180	12	"Pitch Imperfect"	Melissa Kosar	Rich Dahm	January 17, 2017	T12.15262	6.67
181	13	"Ovary and Out"	Elliot Hegarty	Ilana Wernick	February 7, 2017	T12.15263	6.42
182	14	"Sorry Not Sorry"	Phil Traill	Tim Hobert	February 14, 2017	T12.15264	6.32
183	15	"Dental Hijinks"	Lee Shallat Chemel	Jana Hunter & Mitch Hunter	February 21, 2017	T12.15265	6.27
184	16	"Swing and a Miss"	Danny Salles	Roy Brown	March 7, 2017	T12.15266	6.12
185	17	"Exes and Ohhhs"	Lee Shallat Chemel	Rich Dahm	March 14, 2017	T12.15267	5.92
186	18	"The Par-tay"	Jaffar Mahmood	Ilana Wernick	April 4, 2017	T12.15268	5.44
187	19	"The Confirmation"	Charlie McDermott	Tim Hobert	April 11, 2017	T12.15269	5.29
188	20	"Adult Swim"	Lee Shallat Chemel	Jana Hunter & Mitch Hunter	April 18, 2017	T12.15270	5.25
189	21	"Clear and Present Danger"	Phil Traill	Roy Brown	May 2, 2017	T12.15271	5.07
190	22	"The Final Final"	Lee Shallat Chemel	Rich Dahm	May 9, 2017	T12.15272	5.02
191	23	"Fight or Flight"	Eileen Heisler	Ilana Wernick	May 16, 2017	T12.15273	5.27

=== Season 9 (2017–18) ===
No. overall	No. in season	Title	Directed by	Written by	Original release date	Prod. code	U.S. viewers (millions)
192	1	"Vive La Hecks"	Lee Shallat-Chemel	Tim Hobert	October 3, 2017	T12.15651	6.21
193	2	"Please Don't Feed the Hecks"	Phil Traill	Ilana Wernick	October 10, 2017	T12.15652	5.93
194	3	"Meet the Parents"	Lee Shallat-Chemel	Jana Hunter & Mitch Hunter	October 17, 2017	T12.15653	5.53
195	4	"Halloween VIII: Orson Murder Mystery"	Phil Traill	Rich Dahm	October 24, 2017	T12.15654	5.80
196	5	"Role of a Lifetime"	Lee Shallat-Chemel	Roy Brown	October 31, 2017	T12.15655	5.05
197	6	"The Setup"	Victor Nelli Jr.	Tim Hobert	November 7, 2017	T12.15656	5.63
198	7	"Thanksgiving IX"	Phil Traill	Jana Hunter & Mitch Hunter	November 14, 2017	T12.15657	5.70
199	8	"Eyes Wide Open"	Jaffar Mahmood	Rich Dahm	November 21, 2017	T12.15658	6.05
200	9	"The 200th"	Lee Shallat-Chemel	Roy Brown	December 5, 2017	T12.15659	5.78
201	10	"The Christmas Miracle"	Lee Shallat-Chemel	Ilana Wernick	December 12, 2017	T12.15660	5.68
202	11	"New Year's Revelations"	Lee Shallat-Chemel	Tim Hobert	January 2, 2018	T12.15661	6.36
203	12	"The Other Man"	Victor Nelli Jr.	Jana Hunter & Mitch Hunter	January 9, 2018	T12.15662	5.42
204	13	"Mommapalooza"	Phil Traill	Roy Brown	January 16, 2018	T12.15663	6.13
205	14	"Guess Who's Coming to Frozen Dinner"	Lee Shallat-Chemel	Ilana Wernick	February 6, 2018	T12.15664	5.63
206	15	"Toasted"	Lee Shallat-Chemel	A.J. Blum	February 27, 2018	T12.15665	5.23
207	16	"The Crying Game"	Phil Traill	Rich Dahm	March 13, 2018	T12.15666	4.80
208	17	"Hecks vs. Glossners: The Final Battle"	Elliot Hegarty	Tim Hobert	March 20, 2018	T12.15667	5.83
209	18	"Thank You for Not Kissing"	Lee Shallat-Chemel	Jana Hunter & Mitch Hunter	April 3, 2018	T12.15668	8.38
210	19	"Bat Out of Heck"	Danny Salles	Ilana Wernick	April 10, 2018	T12.15669	7.52
211	20	"Great Heckspectations"	Lee Shallat-Chemel	Roy Brown	May 1, 2018	T12.15670	6.15
212	21	"The Royal Flush"	Phil Traill	Rich Dahm	May 8, 2018	T12.15671	5.88
213	22	"Split Decision"	Danny Salles	Tim Hobert	May 15, 2018	T12.15672	6.34
214	23	"A Heck of a Ride"	Lee Shallat-Chemel	Eileen Heisler & DeAnn Heline	May 22, 2018	T12.15673	7.09
215	24	"A Heck of a Ride"	Lee Shallat-Chemel	Eileen Heisler & DeAnn Heline	May 22, 2018	T12.15674	7.09

== Ratings ==
The Middle : U.S. viewers per episode (millions)

Season	Episode number																							
Season	1	2	3	4	5	6	7	8	9	10	11	12	13	14	15	16	17	18	19	20	21	22	23	24
1	8.71	6.79	6.77	6.53	6.49	6.04	7.06	5.94	6.19	7.69	7.37	8.07	5.95	7.32	7.83	5.89	6.30	7.16	6.23	6.70	7.10	6.75	7.49	7.56
2	8.80	8.35	8.03	7.98	8.54	9.54	9.42	9.29	8.25	8.68	9.31	10.09	8.32	8.84	7.85	7.96	7.86	7.05	6.14	6.82	7.08	7.25	7.68	7.33
3	9.74	9.74	8.68	9.13	8.87	9.13	10.16	9.41	9.19	9.08	8.72	9.99	9.45	8.08	8.44	8.04	7.48	8.23	6.93	7.06	6.63	6.60	6.53	6.52
4	9.16	9.16	7.72	7.90	8.39	8.80	9.04	8.79	7.98	7.29	8.39	8.21	8.55	8.21	7.72	8.27	7.97	6.90	7.22	7.55	7.41	6.80	6.76	7.70
5	8.94	8.03	8.25	8.31	8.03	8.93	8.53	7.41	8.08	8.82	7.51	8.04	8.56	6.98	7.32	7.48	7.28	7.20	7.19	7.39	6.65	7.14	7.85	7.85
6	7.59	7.42	7.44	7.29	6.99	8.10	8.32	7.04	8.11	8.46	7.79	8.26	7.82	7.70	7.47	8.20	7.34	7.64	7.28	7.52	7.82	7.39	6.99	7.03
7	8.21	7.91	7.30	7.12	7.08	7.43	7.62	7.93	7.64	8.06	7.84	7.46	7.24	6.85	7.29	7.30	7.15	7.24	7.04	6.98	6.72	7.02	6.73	6.73
8	6.78	6.02	5.72	5.43	6.21	6.88	6.62	6.06	6.39	6.62	7.30	6.67	6.42	6.32	6.27	6.12	5.92	5.44	5.29	5.25	5.07	5.02	5.27	–
9	6.21	5.93	5.53	5.80	5.05	5.63	5.70	6.05	5.78	5.68	6.36	5.42	6.13	5.63	5.23	4.80	5.83	8.38	7.52	6.15	5.88	6.34	7.09	7.09

Audience measurement performed by Nielsen Media Research
