= The Middle (TV series) =

American television sitcom, 2009–2018

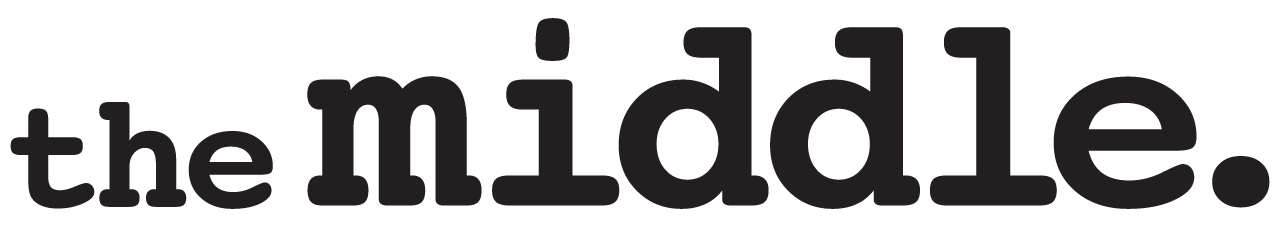
- Genre: Sitcom
- Created by: Eileen Heisler; DeAnn Heline
- Showrunners: Eileen Heisler; DeAnn Heline
- Starring: Neil Flynn; Patricia Heaton; Charlie McDermott; Eden Sher; Atticus Shaffer; Chris Kattan
- Narrated by: Patricia Heaton
- Music by: Joey Newman
- Country of origin: United States
- Original language: English
- No. of seasons: 9
- No. of episodes: 215 (list of episodes)

Production
- Executive producers: DeAnn Heline; Eileen Heisler
- Producers: Werner Walian; Vijal Patel; Roy Brown; Robin Shorr; Matt Dunn
- Camera setup: Single-camera
- Running time: 21 minutes
- Production companies: Blackie and Blondie Productions; Warner Bros. Television

Original release
- Network: ABC
- Release: September 30, 2009 – May 22, 2018

The Middle is an American television sitcom that aired on ABC from September 30, 2009, to May 22, 2018. The series, set in the fictional town of Orson, Indiana, follows a lower middle class family living and facing the day-to-day struggles of home life, work and semi-functioning children.

Starring Patricia Heaton and Neil Flynn, the series was created by former Roseanne and Murphy Brown writers Eileen Heisler and DeAnn Heline and produced by Warner Bros. Television and Blackie and Blondie Productions. It was praised by television critics and earned numerous award nominations, including a nomination for a Primetime Emmy Award in 2012.

== Premise ==
The series features Frances "Frankie" Heck (Patricia Heaton), a lower middle class, middle-aged, Midwestern woman and her husband Mike (Neil Flynn), who reside in the small fictional town of Orson, Indiana, based on the real town of Jasper, Indiana. They are the parents of three children, 15-year-old Axl (Charlie McDermott), 13-year-old Sue (Eden Sher) and 8-year-old Brick (Atticus Shaffer).

The series is narrated by Frankie, initially an under-performing salesperson at a used-car dealership and later a dental assistant. Her stoic husband Mike manages a local quarry and serves as a stabilizing influence in the family, though Frankie complains about his lack of affection at times. The children have distinct differences from each other: eldest son Axl, a stereotypical jock, is outgoing and popular at school but is quite rude and self-centered; daughter Sue is an enthusiastic and perky young girl but is chronically unsuccessful and awkward; and youngest son Brick is an intelligent, compulsive reader with odd behavioral traits. Other characters include Frankie's co-worker Bob (main character in the first two seasons), Frankie's elderly Aunt Edie, Sue's first boyfriend Brad, Mike's brother Rusty and Axl's friends Sean and Darrin, who both had a relationship with Sue.

== Cast and characters ==
- Patricia Heaton as Frances Patricia "Frankie" Heck (née Spence)
- Neil Flynn as Michael Bartholomew "Mike" Heck Jr.
- Charlie McDermott as Axl Redford Heck
- Eden Sher as Sue Sue Heck
- Atticus Shaffer as Brick Ishmail Heck
- Chris Kattan as Bob Weaver (main seasons 1–2; recurring season 3; guest seasons 4–5)

== Episodes ==
Season	Episodes	Originally released	
Season	Episodes	First released	Last released
1	24	September 30, 2009	May 19, 2010
2	24	September 22, 2010	May 25, 2011
3	24	September 21, 2011	May 23, 2012
4	24	September 26, 2012	May 22, 2013
5	24	September 25, 2013	May 21, 2014
6	24	September 24, 2014	May 13, 2015
7	24	September 23, 2015	May 18, 2016
8	23	October 11, 2016	May 16, 2017
9	24	October 3, 2017	May 22, 2018

== Development and production ==
The series was originally developed in the 2006–07 development cycle for ABC and was to star Ricki Lake as Frankie. Atticus Shaffer was the only actor to retain his role when the show was re-developed. ABC later ordered a second pilot tied to Patricia Heaton being cast in the leading role for the 2008–09 development cycle. The series was created by Eileen Heisler and DeAnn Heline (who is from Muncie, Indiana) and the pilot was directed by Julie Anne Robinson.

The show was originally set to take place in Jasper, Indiana, though the setting was changed to the fictional Orson, Indiana, on the advice of attorneys. However, Orson is based on and presumed to be located near Jasper. The show was filmed in Stage 31 at the Warner Bros. Ranch, with the house's exterior and Elhert Motors on the ranch's Blondie Street. Set director Julie Fanton shopped at stores that families are familiar with, such as Target and Kohl's, so the show appears to have a realistic middle-class look.

The series was picked up for a full season of 24 episodes after airing just two episodes. On January 12, 2010, ABC Entertainment President Steve McPherson announced that he was renewing The Middle for a second season. The show was renewed for a third season. The third season premiered with a one-hour episode on September 21, 2011. On May 10, 2012, ABC renewed the show for a fourth season, which premiered with a one-hour special on September 26, 2012. The show was renewed for a fifth season on May 10, 2013. ABC confirmed on May 9, 2014, that the series was picked up for a sixth season of 22 episodes, and officially ordered an additional two episodes in October of that year, bringing the season six total to 24.

On May 8, 2015, ABC officially picked up the series for a seventh season, renewing the contracts of the main cast at the same time. ABC renewed the series for season eight with a 22-episode order, later expanded to 23 episodes in December 2016.

The series was renewed for a ninth season on January 25, 2017, with filming beginning on August 15, 2017. On August 2, 2017, it was announced that the series would end after its ninth season, at the request of the series' creators. The one-hour series finale aired on May 22, 2018.

== Release ==
=== Broadcast ===
The Middle premiered on ABC in the United States on September 30, 2009. The series aired on City (formerly Citytv) in Canada from the third to ninth season. Previously, the show aired on A (now CTV Two) during its first season. In Australia, the show premiered on December 7, 2009, on Nine Network. The New Zealand premiere was on May 8, 2010, on TV2. In India, the show premiered on January 5, 2015, on Romedy Now; it has been adapted in Hindi as Tedi Medi Family for Big Magic. In the UK, it premiered on August 29, 2010, on Sky1. In 2026, the show began airing on TLC in the UK & Ireland. Season 5 premiered on Comedy Central UK on January 21, 2014, and in Ireland on April 16, 2014, on TV3. It is also broadcast on the Neox Channel in Spain and Warner Channel in Latin America and Brazil.

=== Syndication ===
On March 6, 2012, it was announced that ABC Family obtained the rights to The Middle, which aired the series from September 9, 2013, to August 22, 2022.

The series debuted in local syndication on September 16, 2013, but the show is no longer available for local syndication as of September 2017.

Hallmark Channel also acquired The Middle for syndication, which began airing in March 2014. However, the series left the network in August 2018. On August 5, 2019, the series rejoined the Hallmark Channel's line-up, airing in a block from 6:00–8:00 a.m. In October 2019, the series again left the schedule. On May 17, 2021, the series once again rejoined the Hallmark Channel's line-up, airing in a block from 1:00–3:00 p.m.

=== Streaming ===
The Middle began streaming on HBO Max in the United States on December 1, 2020, but was no longer streaming on HBO Max as of December 1, 2023. The series has also been available for streaming on IMDb TV. As of 2022, the series also streams on Peacock in the United States.

The Middle was made available to stream on HBO Max in Bulgaria on March 8, 2022, but only with English audio. In Latin America the series is available to stream on HBO Max since December 13, 2023, with audios and subtitles in English, Brazilian Portuguese and Latin Spanish. In the UK, the show was available for streaming on ITVX, though this expired in 2026. As of December 2024, the series is available on Amazon Prime Video, though not in India.

As of February 18, 2026, The Middle is streaming on Netflix across various regions outside the United States.

== Home media ==
In Region 1, seasons 1–4 had an official retail release. Seasons 5-9 were released as a MOD DVD-R via the Warner Archive Collection. The Canadian releases continue to be traditionally manufactured and sold, but are otherwise identical to their American counterparts. Distribution for regions 2 and 4 ended after the fourth season.

== Reception ==
=== Critical reception ===
The Middle received mostly positive reviews from critics, citing its unique and original characters, and praising the show's consistent standard and realistic portrayal of lower-middle-class families. On the review aggregator website Washington Post, 76% of 21 critics' reviews are positive, with an average rating of 7.1/10 than negative.The website's consensus reads: "The Middle is a smart and engaging sitcom, able to exaggerate everyday situations to great comedic effect." Metacritic, which uses a weighted average, assigned the film a score of 70 out of 100, based on 25 critics, indicating "generally favorable" reviews.

Critics also praised the show's timing, writing, and acting; e.g., Robert Bianco of USA Today wrote, "...This series seems to more assuredly offer a first-class version of what so many viewers say they want: a humorous, heartfelt, realistic look at middle-class, middle-America family life." Entertainment Weekly's Ken Tucker observed in season 2 that The Middle continues to be "a rock-solid show, the saga of a family struggling to keep their heads above the choppy economic waters."

In the 2009–2010 season, The Middle was soon ranked number six on Metacritic's "Best Reviewed New Network Show" list. Airing behind the quickly cancelled Hank during its first season, ratings were not initially impressive at first, averaging fewer than 7 million viewers but became more appealing as the series continued to the viewers.At the start of the 2010/2011 season, ABC moved the show to the beginning of its prime time block (8:00 pm EDT), and ratings increased substantially, with the show usually ranking second in its time slot to CBS's Survivor.

Season 2, 4, and 9 received critical acclaim on Rotten Tomatoes with a 100% based on 5 reviews with an average score of 8.4/10 (for season 2), based on 5 reviews with an average score of 9/10 (for season 4), and based on 8 reviews with an average score of 8.5/10.

In 2016, Bob Sassone of Esquire published an article called "The Middle Is the Best TV Show You're Not Watching", wherein he expresses the dissatisfaction of the series not having received nominations for several awards nor the deserved attention of the critics; he noted: "The Middle is the finest American sitcom on TV right now". After ABC confirmed that the ninth season of The Middle would be the last, Devon Ivie of Vulture wrote: "The Middle Is One of TV's Most Underrated Gems", sharing, "I'll miss the midwestern comfort of The Middle tremendously", and enumerating five reasons why readers should give the show a chance to charm them.

=== Podcast ===
On July 31, 2024, Middling, a podcast hosted by Eden Sher and Brock Ciarlelli, premiered. The podcast discusses each episode of the series, its legacy, and features interviews with guest stars about their experiences on the show.

=== Ratings ===
Season	Timeslot (ET)	Episodes	Premiered			Ended			TV season	Rank (viewers)	Rank (demo)	Viewers (in millions)	Demo (18–49)
Season	Timeslot (ET)	Episodes	Date	Premiere viewers (in millions)	18–49 rating	Date	Finale viewers (in millions)	18–49 rating	TV season	Rank (viewers)	Rank (demo)	Viewers (in millions)	Demo (18–49)
1	Wednesday 8:30 pm	24	September 30, 2009	8.71	2.6	May 19, 2010	7.56	2.5	2009–10	68	63	6.69	2.3
2	Wednesday 8:00 pm	24	September 22, 2010	8.80	2.7	May 25, 2011	7.33	2.2	2010–11	51	59	8.08	2.4
3	Wednesday 8:00 pm	24	September 21, 2011	9.74	3.1	May 23, 2012	6.52	2.0	2011–12	60	63	8.08	2.5
4	Wednesday 8:00 pm	24	September 26, 2012	9.16	2.9	May 22, 2013	7.70	2.0	2012–13	45	44	8.42	2.5
5	Wednesday 8:00 pm	24	September 25, 2013	8.94	2.5	May 21, 2014	7.85	2.1	2013–14	44	N/A	8.24	N/A
6	Wednesday 8:00 pm	24	September 24, 2014	7.59	2.2	May 13, 2015	7.03	1.8	2014–15	53	41	8.68	2.4
7	Wednesday 8:00 pm	24	September 23, 2015	8.21	2.1	May 18, 2016	6.73	1.6	2015–16	53	34	8.15	2.2
8	Tuesday 8:00 pm	23	October 11, 2016	6.78	1.8	May 16, 2017	5.27	1.2	2016–17	53	43	7.02	1.8
9	Tuesday 8:00 pm (1–17); Tuesday 8:30 pm (18–23); Tuesday 9:00 pm (24)	24	October 3, 2017	6.21	1.6	May 22, 2018	7.09	1.7	2017–18	55	34	7.28	1.9

Season 3's "Halloween II" was the most watched episode of the series, viewed by 10.16 million viewers.

=== Awards and nominations ===
In 2011, The Middle received a Gracie Award for Outstanding Comedy Series. The 1st Critics' Choice Television Awards nominated the series for Best Comedy Series, Patricia Heaton for Best Actress in a Comedy Series, and Eden Sher for Best Supporting Actress in a Comedy Series.

Year	Award	Category	Recipient(s)	Result	Ref(s)
2010	Young Artist Award	Best Recurring Young Actor 14 and Over	Brock Ciarlelli	Nominated	
2010	Young Artist Award	Best Recurring Young Actress	Eden Sher	Nominated	
2010	Humanitas Prize	30 Minute Category	Episode: "The Block Party"	Nominated	
2011	Gracie Award	Outstanding Comedy Series	The Middle	Won	
2011	1st Critics' Choice Television Awards	Best Comedy Series	The Middle	Nominated	
2011	1st Critics' Choice Television Awards	Best Actress in a Comedy Series	Patricia Heaton	Nominated	
2011	1st Critics' Choice Television Awards	Best Supporting Actress in a Comedy Series	Eden Sher	Nominated	
2011	Young Artist Award	Best Guest Starring Young Actor Ten and Under	Parker Contreras	Won	
2011	Young Artist Award	Best Guest Starring Young Actor Ten and Under	Mason Cook	Nominated	
2011	Young Artist Award	Best Recurring Young Actor	Brock Ciarlelli	Won	
2011	Young Artist Award	Best Guest Starring Young Actress 11–15	Kelly Heyer	Nominated	
2011	Young Artist Award	Best Recurring Young Actress 17–21	Blaine Saunders	Nominated	
2011	Young Artist Award	Outstanding Young Ensemble in a TV Series	Eden Sher, Atticus Shaffer, and Charlie McDermott	Nominated	
2012	2nd Critics' Choice Television Awards	Best Supporting Actress in a Comedy Series	Eden Sher	Nominated	
2012	1st PAAFTJ Television Awards	Best Comedy Series	The Middle	Nominated	
2012	1st PAAFTJ Television Awards	Best Actress in a Comedy Series	Patricia Heaton (Episode: "Thanksgiving III")	Won	
2012	1st PAAFTJ Television Awards	Best Supporting Actress in a Comedy Series	Eden Sher (Episode: "The Test")	Nominated	
2012	1st PAAFTJ Television Awards	Best Production Design in a Comedy Series	Episode: "The Map"	Nominated	
2012	Young Artist Award	Best Recurring Young Actor 17–21	Brock Ciarlelli	Won	
2012	Young Artist Award	Best Guest Starring Young Actress 17–21	Katlin Mastandrea	Nominated	
2012	Young Artist Award	Best Guest Starring Young Actress Ten and Under	Marlowe Peyton	Nominated	
2012	Primetime Emmy Award	Outstanding Makeup for a Single-Camera Series (Non-Prosthetic)	Episode: "The Play"	Nominated	
2012	Humanitas Prize	30 Minute Category	Episode: "The Map"	Nominated	
2012	TV Guide Award	Favorite Comedy Series	The Middle	Nominated	
2012	Online Film & Television Association Award	Best Guest Actress in a Comedy Series	Whoopi Goldberg	Nominated	
2013	Young Artist Award	Best Recurring Young Actor 17–21	Brock Ciarlelli	Won	
2013	Young Artist Award	Best Recurring Young Actress 17–21	Katlin Mastandrea	Nominated	
2013	3rd Critics' Choice Television Awards	Best Comedy Series	The Middle	Nominated	
2013	3rd Critics' Choice Television Awards	Best Supporting Actress in a Comedy Series	Eden Sher	Won	
2013	2013 Teen Choice Awards	Choice TV Female Scene Stealer	Eden Sher	Nominated	
2013	TV Guide Award	Favorite Comedy Series	The Middle	Nominated	
2013	2nd PAAFTJ Television Awards	Best Comedy Series	The Middle	Nominated	
2013	2nd PAAFTJ Television Awards	Best Supporting Actor in a Comedy Series	Charlie McDermott	Nominated	
2013	2nd PAAFTJ Television Awards	Best Artistic/Visual Achievement in a Comedy Series	Episode: "Hallelujah Hoedown"	Nominated	
2013	EWwy Awards	Best Actor in a Comedy Series	Neil Flynn	Nominated	
2014	Young Artist Award	Best Recurring Young Actor 17–21	Brock Ciarlelli	Nominated	
2014	Young Artist Award	Best Recurring Young Actress 17–21	Katlin Mastandrea	Nominated	
2014	EWwy Awards	Best Supporting Actress in a Comedy Series	Eden Sher	Won	
2014	ASCAP Film and Television Music Awards	Top TV Series	Joey Newman	Won	
2014	Humanitas Prize	30 Minute Category	Episode: "Halloween IV: The Ghost Story"	Nominated	
2014	2014 Teen Choice Awards	Choice TV Scene Stealer: Female	Eden Sher	Nominated	
2014	TV Guide Award	Favorite Comedy Series	The Middle	Nominated	
2015	5th Critics' Choice Television Awards	Best Supporting Actress in a Comedy Series	Eden Sher	Nominated	
2015	Young Artist Award	Best Recurring Young Actor 17–21	Brock Ciarlelli	Won	
2015	Young Artist Award	Best Guest Starring Young Actress 14–16	Ava Allan	Nominated	
2015	Kids' Choice Awards	Favorite TV Actor	Charlie McDermott	Nominated	
2015	Online Film & Television Association Award	Best Guest Actor in a Comedy Series	Dick Van Dyke	Nominated	
2016	6th Critics' Choice Television Awards	Best Supporting Actress in a Comedy Series	Eden Sher	Nominated	
2016	6th Critics' Choice Television Awards	Best Supporting Actor in a Comedy Series	Neil Flynn	Nominated	
2016	Humanitas Prize	30 Minute Category	Episode: "The Graduate"	Won	
2016	Young Entertainer Awards	Best Recurring Young Actress – Television Series	Casey Burke	Nominated	
2016	Young Entertainer Awards	Best Guest Starring Young Actor – Television Series	Matt Cornett	Won	
2017	ASCAP Film and Television Music Awards	Top Television Series	Joey Newman	Won	
2017	Young Artist Award	Best Performance in a TV Series – Recurring Teen Actress	Casey Burke	Nominated	
2018	Young Entertainer Awards	Best Recurring Young Actress – Television Series	Casey Burke	Won	
2018	Movieguide Awards	Faith and Freedom Award for TV	Episode: "The 200th"	Nominated	
2019	9th Critics' Choice Television Awards	Best Comedy Series	The Middle	Nominated	

== Cancelled spin-off ==
=== Development ===
On May 30, 2018, Variety reported that a spin-off was being eyed following the cancellation of Roseanne. Almost two months later, on July 20, 2018, in an interview with TVLine's Michael Ausiello, Sher revealed that ABC had ordered a pilot for the potential series. It was noted that the potential spin-off would be set a few years after The Middle ended and follow Sue Heck as an adult. The spin-off was officially ordered on August 13, 2018, and will follow "the twentysomething adventures of eternal optimist Sue Heck as she leaves the small town of Orson to navigate the ups and downs of a career and young adulthood in the big city of Chicago". As of October 5, 2018, the pilot was being filmed. The series was originally to be titled Sue Sue in the City, but this decision was later reversed, and the series remained untitled. On November 21, 2018, TVLine and Deadline reported that the spin-off would not be moving forward at ABC; it was shopped to other networks, but ultimately was never picked up.

=== Casting ===
On October 5, 2018, it was announced that major recurring character Brad Bottig, played by Brock Ciarlelli, had joined the cast as a series regular. A few days later on October 8, 2018, it was reported that Kimberley Crossman would join the cast as the character Remi, a hotel chef still recovering from a messy breakup that ended poorly with her boyfriend that later coincidently, Sue would find herself working at the same hotel as Remi. On October 10, 2018, Finesse Mitchell joined the cast as Hudson, a bartender with a big heart who works at the same hotel as Sue.The following day, it was announced that Silicon Valley's Chris Diamantopoulos would play Sue's "mercurial, charming and rich" boss Nick, with newcomer Aaron Branch playing Otis, the hotel's naïve but endearing bellhop.
