= Kenya D. Williamson =

American novelist

- Born: Kenya Dieja Williamson; Levittown, Pennsylvania, U.S.
- Education: Temple University
- Occupations: Novelist; actress; screenwriter
- Years active: 1997–present
- Website: http://www.kenyadwilliamson.com

Kenya D. Williamson is an American novelist, short fiction author, screenwriter and actress. Her works of fiction include Depth of Focus: A Novel, Checked Out and Drive. She often posts excerpts of her works in progress on Scribd. Her acting highlights include roles in House M.D., Yes, Dear, Commuters and The Girls' Room.

== Biography ==
Williamson graduated from Neshaminy High School in Langhorne, Pennsylvania and was awarded an Outstanding Achievement Scholarship by Temple University in Philadelphia, where she studied theater and journalism. Currently, she writes short fiction, novels and screenplays. She's appeared in multiple commercials, including Comcast, Lowe's, Honda, Tylenol and Taco Bell.

== Filmography ==
- House M.D. (2005) - Nurse
- Commuters (2005) - Byanca Johnson
- Target (2004) - Miss Demmings
- Yes, Dear (2003) - Wendy
- Mister Sterling (2003) - Executive Assistant
- The Girls' Room (2000) - Zoe
- Red Handed (1999) - Paramedic
- Saved by the Bell: The New Class (1998) - Amanda
- The Players Club (1998) - Student
- Working (1997)
- Living Single (1997)
- One Eight Seven (1997)

=== Trivia ===
Williamson wrote and co-starred in the web series "Ernie's Girls." She voiced the 9-year-old character Lorrin for Health Nuts Media's animated project. She was selected as a semi-finalist for Film Independent's Project: Involve in Spring 2008 and was mistakenly credited as Kenya Williams in 1998's The Players Club. She began playing the violin at age 8.
