= Kenia Arias =

Puerto Rico-born singer-songwriter

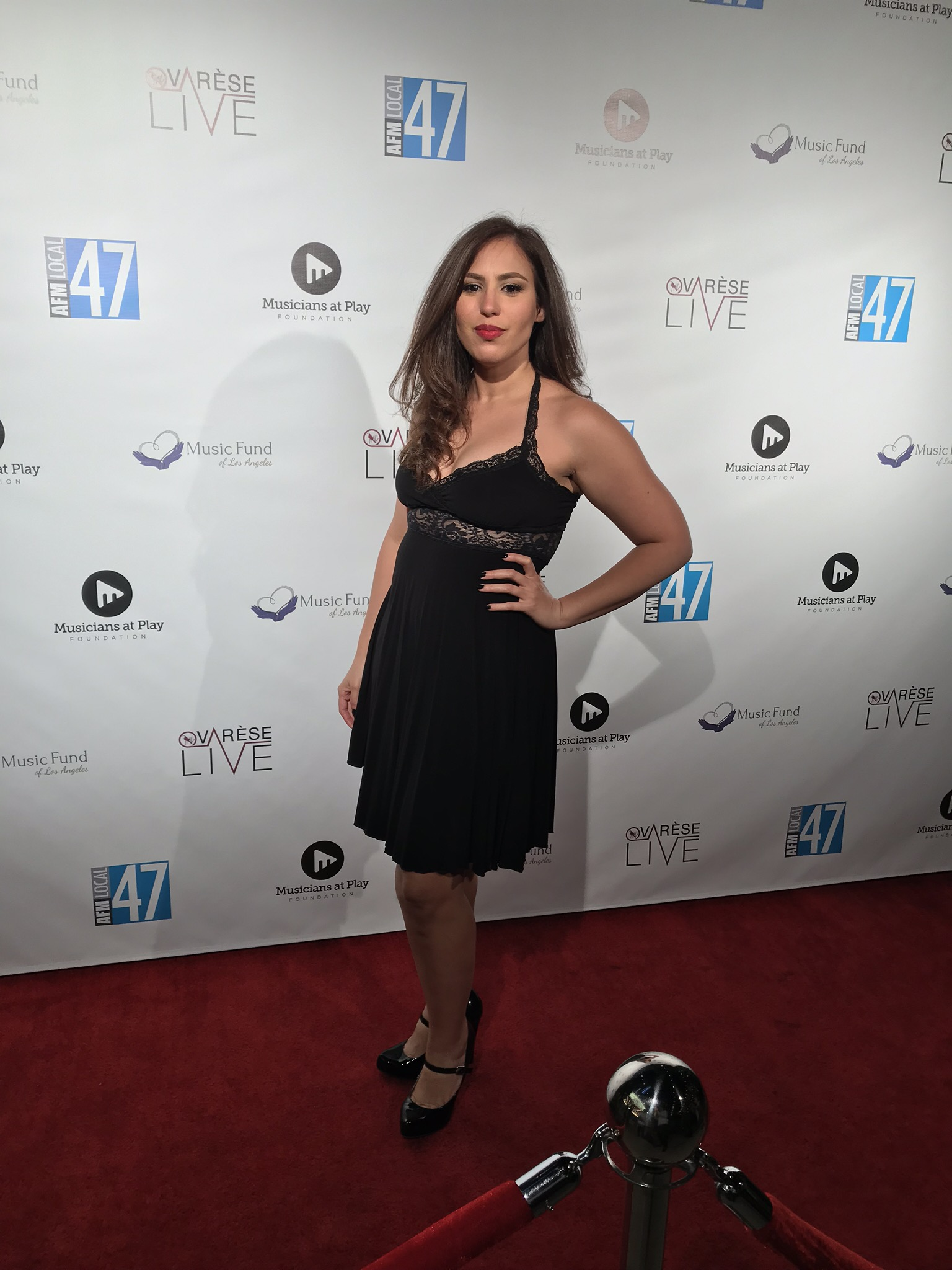
- Kenia Arias at the Alex Theatre's Celebrating Lalo Schifrin, An 85th Birthday Concert

Background information
- Born: Kenia Arias; Río Piedras, San Juan, Puerto Rico
- Origin: Medford, New York City
- Genres: Salsa, Pop, Bomba, Hip-hop
- Occupations: Singer, songwriter
- Instrument: Vocals
- Years active: 2009–present
- Website: keniaarias.com

Kenia Arias, known mononymously as Kenia (/ˈkɛnjə/ KEN-yə), is a Puerto Rican and Dominican recording artist, lyricist, and actor. She has independently released two mixtapes, one EP and three albums. She has collaborated with various independent rap artists throughout her career. Kenia has appeared in television shows, such as USA's Graceland and Netflix's Glow.

== Biography ==
=== Early life and influences ===
Kenia was born to Jaime Arias and Mercedes E. Hernandez. Kenia was raised with her older brother Jimmy Arias in Medford, Long Island, New York. Kenia has three half siblings, one of which is deceased, from her father's previous marriage. Her ethnicity is Puerto Rican and Dominican.

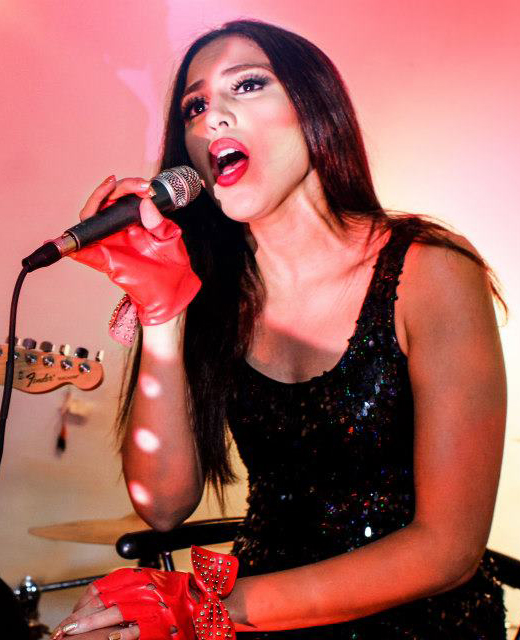
Kenia Arias performing live at LMNT in Miami's Wynwood Art District.

Kenia first showed interest in performing at the age of four, and at the age of six decided she wanted to become a professional singer and actor. Kenia was 12 when she and a neighbor formed an all-girl group entitled "The Lazers". The group recruited a third member and would perform covers of Salt n' Pepper songs for their neighbors on the block. Kenia has been quoted as saying "I just felt an urgency to entertain; I wanted to put on a good show for people and make them feel happy". Kenia was, 14 when she first performed professionally at a resort in Puerto Rico and shot her first commercial. Two years later, Kenia began writing her own material and recording at several recording studios in Manhattan, New York. Kenia grew up listening to Madonna, Mariah Carey, Wu-Tang Clan, Nas, Celia Cruz, Fania All-Stars, Groupo Mania, Janet Jackson, Selena y Los Dinos, Little Kim, Juan Luis Guerra, Alanis Morissette and many more; which have all, to some degree, inspired Kenia's music. During this time, Kenia signed a production deal and released her first self-titled album.

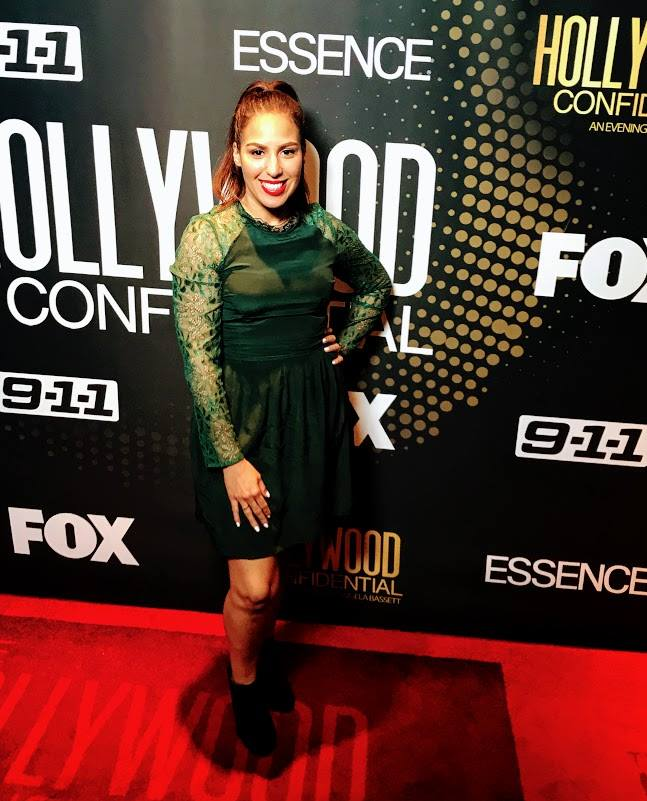
Kenia Arias at the Essence Magazine And Hollywood Confidential Present "An Evening with Angela Bassett" Event.

While attending Patchogue-Medford High School, Kenia was involved in New York State beauty pageants and was awarded the titles of "Miss Teen Long Island" and" Miss Teen Talent New York State" along with many sub-categories such as "Miss Congeniality". She was featured in many local papers pertaining to her pageant career. Kenia also performed on Showtime at the Apollo, Puerto Rican Day Parade and Club New York.

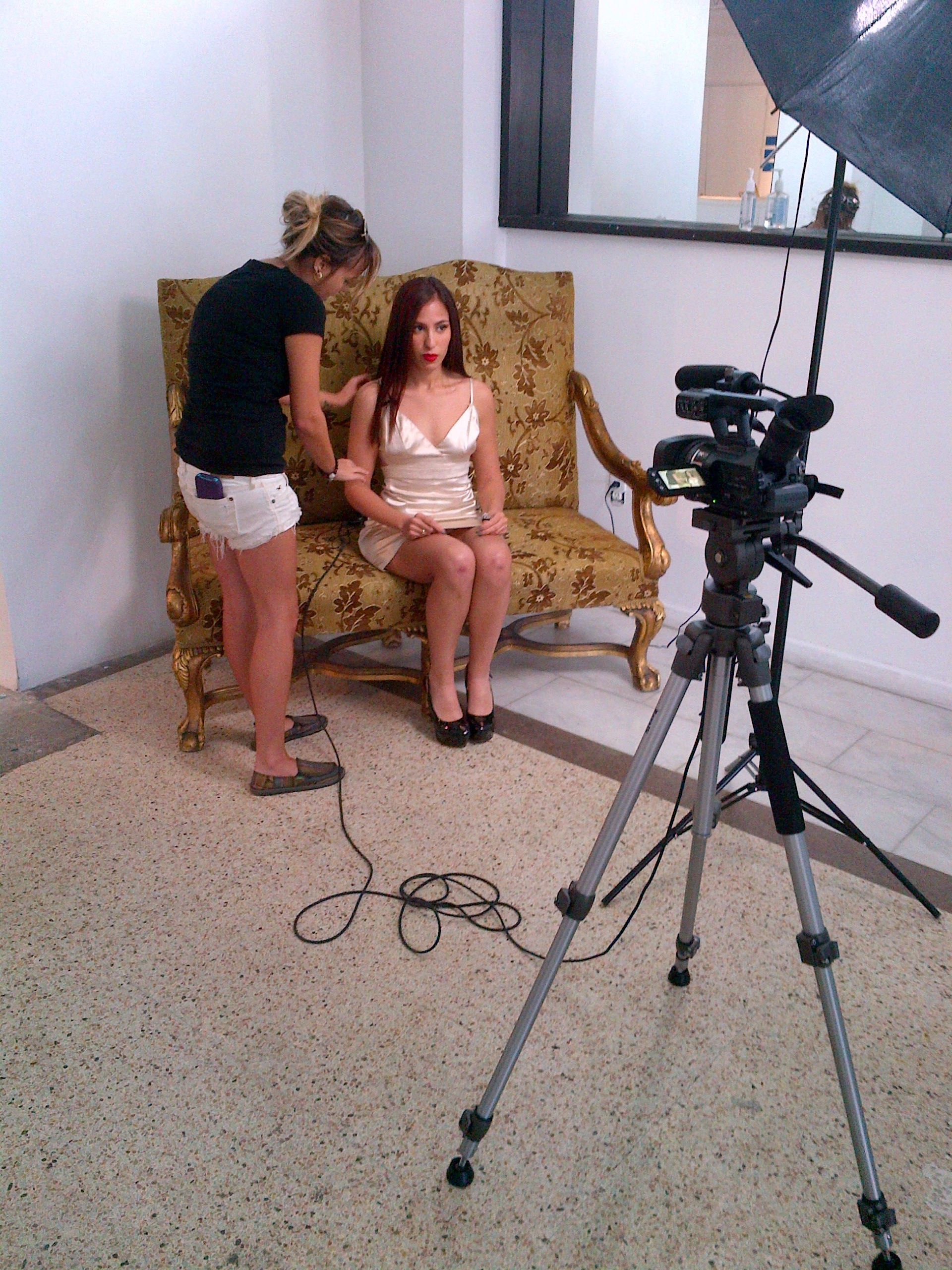
Behind the scenes at LMNT in Miami, Florida.

=== Career ===
==== Early career ====
Kenia began her entertainment career when she was cast a dancer in a national dance television show; she remained on the show for two seasons. She subsequently signed with two talent agencies and expanded her career into print and promotional modeling. Kenia later shifted her professional focus exclusively to music. Kenia recorded her first self-titled studio album in Manhattan, New York. She was involved in the production as vocalist; songwriter, had a minor role as the producer on the album. Kenia relocated with her family to Florida, where she attended Indian River State College. There she was cast in her first theater production. Kenia had never taken acting classes and was not involved in the theater program while attending. However, she decided to audition for a play the department was casting and landed a supporting role. During this time, she auditioned for a musical at her local community theater and was cast in a supporting role. Kenia sang at several community festivals in Port Saint Lucie, Florida and Stuart, Florida.

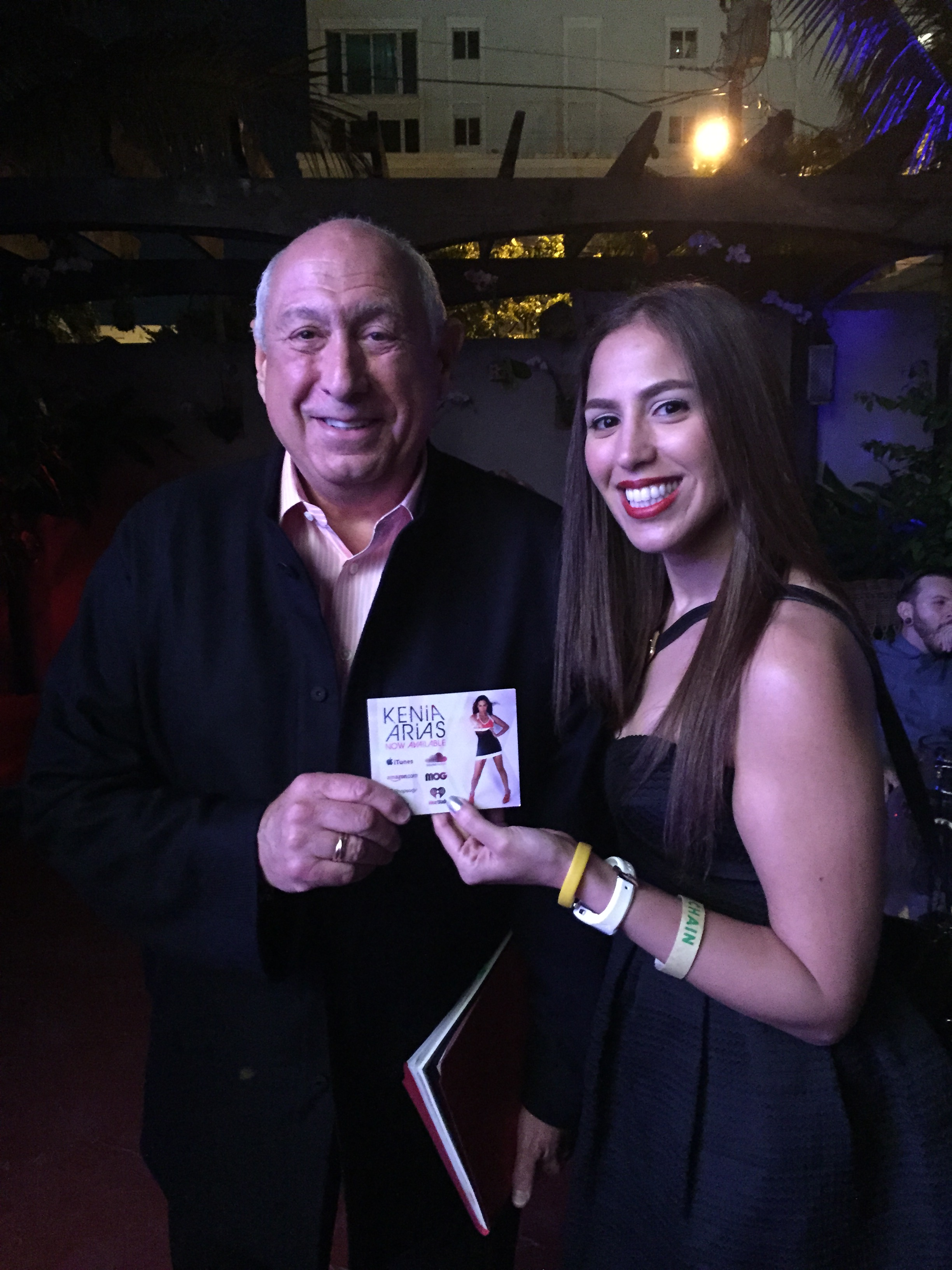
David Bercuson, P.A and Kenia Arias at Ball & Chain: Live Music Miami, Florida

==== Music career and independent releases ====
Kenia continued submitting demos to several agencies and was eventually signed to a distribution deal. Kenia recorded eight songs and is credited as vocalist, lyricist and producer on her album entitled "Karma'. The album consisted of pop-rock, hip hop and Latin genres. Following the recording of Karma, Kenia began organizing an independently funded national tour. However, preparations were discontinued following a serious medical emergency involving her father. Kenia subsequently parted ways with her distributer and transitioned to independently distributing her music. She later returned to the studio to record "Unconscious", an EP released in partnership with Universal Music. The project drew inspiration from personal experiences surrounding her father's health challenges, exploring themes of resilience, reflection, and personal transformation. Kenia and her artistic career were also featured in two issues of Stuart Magazine, a regional publication distributed through retailers including Barnes & Noble.

Kenia Arias at Power Station Recording Studios in Pompano Beach, FL

==== Boricana ====
Following a period away from recording, Kenia adopted the stage name BoriCana, a reference to her Puerto Rican and Dominican heritage. The name marked a new artistic direction, incorporating tribal-inspired rhythms and hip-hop influences into her musical style.

=== Personal life ===
Kenia resides in Los Angeles, California, with her husband, actor and producer Alexander Stein, whom she met while attending Indian River State College. The couple have collaborated on several creative productions, with Alexander Stein contributing as a producer on many of Kenia's projects. Kenia earned her bachelor's degree from Florida International University in Miami, FL.

== Discography ==
=== Studio albums ===
- Karma (2010)
- Unconscious (2013)

=== Singles ===
- "Animal Instinct" (2012)

== Filmography ==
=== Film ===
Year	Title	Role	Director
2015	Tomorrowland	DQ Patron	Brad Bird
2019	Captain Marvel	Commuter/Tourist	Anna Boden and Ryan Fleck

=== Television ===
Year	Title	Role	Episode	Director
2015	Graceland	Physical Therapist	"Master of Weak Ties"	Lucy Liu
