= House season 1 =

House
- Season 1
- Season 1 DVD cover
- Starring: Hugh Laurie; Lisa Edelstein; Omar Epps; Robert Sean Leonard; Jennifer Morrison; Jesse Spencer
- No. of episodes: 22

Release
- Original network: Fox
- Original release: November 16, 2004 – May 24, 2005

Season chronology
- Next → Season 2

The first season of House premiered November 16, 2004, and ended May 24, 2005. The season follows Dr. Gregory House and his team as they solve a medical case each episode. The season's sub-plot revolves around billionaire Edward Vogler making a $100 million donation to the hospital. Through this donation, Vogler becomes the new chairman of the board and orders House to fire one of his team members. Vogler does this to show House he can control him: "I need to know that whatever I ask you to do, however distasteful you find it, you'll do it".

Chi McBride joined the cast as Vogler in five episodes of the season. His character was brought in after Universal Studios president Jeff Zucker threatened that the season would be cut short by six episodes if a "boss" character was not added. While there were possibilities of the character returning, he was generally disliked by viewers and critics and therefore not brought back to the show. Sela Ward, who would return as the main recurring character of season two, appeared in the final two episodes as Stacy Warner, House's former girlfriend.

== Episodes ==
No. overall	No. in season	Title	Directed by	Written by	Original release date	US viewers (millions)
1	1	"Pilot" "Everybody Lies"	Bryan Singer	David Shore	November 16, 2004	7.05
Rebecca Adler (Robin Tunney), a 29-year-old kindergarten teacher, becomes aphasic and collapses from a seizure in her classroom. Dr. Gregory House initially refuses the case until Dr. James Wilson tells him that Rebecca is his cousin. When Dr. Lisa Cuddy tries to make House fulfill his clinical duties, he refuses but is forced to do them when his authorization to the MRI is revoked. He diagnoses Rebecca with cerebral vasculitis and her condition improves with treatment. To find the source of Rebecca's seizures, House convinces Dr. Eric Foreman to break into Rebecca's house. At the hospital, Rebecca suddenly loses her vision and suffers another seizure. Foreman discovers ham at Rebecca's house, revealing both Wilson's lie (Wilson is Jewish and the presence of ham indicates Rebecca is not, thereby suggesting the two are not related) and the cause of the seizure—tapeworms (namely, a tapeworm larva embedded in her brain). When Rebecca refuses treatment, House persuades her otherwise by proving her condition with a non-invasive X-ray suggested by Dr. Robert Chase, which depicts a tapeworm larva embedded in her leg, supporting their diagnosis. Final diagnosis: Neurocysticercosis
2	2	"Paternity"	Peter O'Fallon	Lawrence Kaplow	November 23, 2004	6.09
A 16-year-old high school student, Dan (Scott Mechlowicz), starts suffering night terrors and frequent hallucinations after playing lacrosse at school. Dan's parents take him to see Dr. House after receiving a letter that Cameron sent in House's name. Upon meeting the family, House begins a bet to determine whether they are his biological parents. After Dan exhibits more symptoms, including a myoclonic twitch and a blocked blood vessel, House diagnoses Dan. Dan suffers from an auditory hallucination during a procedure, however, ruling out House's diagnosis. Using coffee cups from the parents, House does an unauthorized paternity test and discovers that neither parent is biologically related to Dan. House flashbacks to a case he had earlier that involved a mother who did not want her baby to be vaccinated and theorizes that Dan is suffering from a measles virus contracted during his childhood. House confirms his diagnosis with a retinal biopsy and successfully cures Dan. Final diagnosis: Subacute sclerosing panencephalitis
3	3	"Occam's Razor"	Bryan Singer	David Shore	November 30, 2004	6.33
A college student named Brandon (Kevin Zegers) collapses after having sex with his fiancée. His symptoms seem too numerous to be explained by just one disease. Foreman and House suggest different diagnoses with each one arguing that his own respective theory better conforms to Occam's razor. But then Brandon's white blood cell count drops, proving both doctors wrong. At the clinic pharmacy, House theorizes that the pharmacist accidentally gave Brandon colchicine instead of cough medicine, which explains all of his symptoms aside from his cough. House gives Brandon the cure, and he immediately begins to recover, though nobody believes the pharmacist made a mistake. However, when Brandon comments that his old cough medicine did not have letters on it like his current pills, House discovers colchicine pills that look similar to cough medicine, revealing the source and confirming House's diagnosis. Final diagnosis: Colchicine poisoning and mild chest infection
4	4	"Maternity"	Newton Thomas Sigel	Peter Blake	December 7, 2004	6.74
After overhearing a conversation about a sick baby, House investigates the maternity ward and predicts an epidemic. After realizing the severity of the disease, Cuddy quarantines the maternity ward. In an effort to discover the source of the epidemic, House begins treating the children. However, when the kidneys of two of the children shut down, House is forced to test which drug caused the failure, resulting in one of the babies dying. Following an autopsy, the team discovers the presence of echovirus 11, CMV, and parvovirus B19 antibodies. They test the mothers and decide the cause of the epidemic is the Echovirus. Using an experimental antivirus, they successfully cure the remaining babies. House, determined to find the entry point of the virus, finds an elderly hospital volunteer coughing and wiping her nose as she pushes around a cart of baby toys and blankets and makes the connection. Final diagnosis: Echovirus 11
5	5	"Damned If You Do"	Greg Yaitanes	Sara B. Cooper	December 14, 2004	6.91
Sister Augustine (Elizabeth Mitchell) arrives at the hospital with her hands covered in severe rash, which her fellow nuns think looks like stigmata and which House diagnoses as dermatitis caused by a dish soap allergy. When the antihistamines he gives her cause an asthma attack, House administers epinephrine, and she suffers a minor heart attack. House's team suspects that House made a mistake with the epinephrine, but when they try to find the source of her problems, she suffers hallucinations, convulsions and a rash appears on her leg. Cuddy pulls House off of the case when she hears of House's methodology. An investigation of the convent reveals figwort tea, which explains only the reaction with the epinephrine. She is placed in a hypoallergenic room but inexplicably still has an allergic reaction. But when she begins shouting that she has God inside her, it allows House to find a copper IUD inside her uterus. The device is surgically removed and she fully recovers. Final diagnosis: Allergy to Copper IUD
6	6	"The Socratic Method"	Peter Medak	John Mankiewicz	December 21, 2004	6.73
A mother, Lucille Palmeiro (Stacy Edwards), collapses after a blood clot travels from her leg to her heart. After arriving in the hospital, she begins to vomit blood, causing House to expect a Vitamin K deficiency. House's team discover unused Ampicillin and frozen microwave burgers, supporting House's diagnosis. An ultrasound of Lucille's liver reveals cirrhosis and a cancerous tumor. The tumor is too large to resect but House orders the team to shrink the tumor with an injection of ethanol so that the surgeon will operate. They are still unable to explain the cirrhosis. However, Lucille, in a decision House claims to be inconsistent with her schizophrenia, calls Social Services to take her son. The team consider that Wilson's disease could explain all symptoms and an eye exam shows copper-colored rings around her irises. Lucille receives treatment, is healed, and reunites with her son. Final diagnosis: Vitamin K deficiency, hepatocellular carcinoma, and Wilson's disease
7	7	"Fidelity"	Bryan Spicer	Thomas L. Moran	December 28, 2004	6.91
After returning from jogging with his best friend, Ed (Dominic Purcell) is uncharacteristically abused by his bedridden wife, Elise (Myndy Crist). House concludes that she either has rabbit fever from cooking rabbits or African sleeping sickness, which must have been sexually transmitted since neither of them has been to Africa. They both strongly deny having an affair so House starts treatment for rabbit fever. When this fails he successfully treats her for sleeping sickness. She confesses to an affair with her husband's best friend, causing her husband to leave her. Final diagnosis: Human African trypanosomiasis
8	8	"Poison"	Guy Ferland	Matt Witten	January 25, 2005	12.37
House and his team investigate the mysterious poisoning of high-school student Matt Davis (John Patrick Amedori), until another teen is brought in with all of the same symptoms but almost nothing else in common with Matt. Eventually it is discovered that both youths bought very cheap pairs of jeans at a car boot sale. The jeans were exposed to high doses of pesticides. Meanwhile, House has an old lady hit on him who turns out to have Neurosyphilis. Final diagnosis: Phosdrin poisoning
9	9	"DNR"	Frederick King Keller	David Foster	February 1, 2005	12.75
John Henry Giles (Harry Lennix), a legendary jazz musician with ALS, is brought in to be treated by Foreman for pneumonia. House's attempt to prove that he doesn't really have ALS causes John Henry to suffer respiratory failure. House intubates him in violation of his DNR and tries to keep him on life support using a legal technicality. Cameron notices a blood clot, which is removed, and MRI reveals an Arteriovenous malformation which is operated on restoring his ability to walk. Meanwhile, Foreman receives a lucrative job offer from John Henry's doctor, his former mentor. Final diagnosis: Arteriovenous malformation
10	10	"Histories"	Dan Attias	Joel Thompson	February 8, 2005	14.97
Dr. Foreman believes an uncooperative homeless woman (Leslie Hope) is faking seizures to get a meal ticket at the hospital. But her situation strikes a chord with Dr. Wilson and he resolves to keep her from falling between the cracks. Meanwhile, House gets an audience of two medical students who are learning how to conduct medical histories. The patient is ultimately diagnosed with both tuberculoma and rabies which is far beyond the point of treatment and the patient dies. Due to being bitten by the patient, Foreman is required to undergo rabies treatment himself. Remorseful for his disbelief in the patient's story, Foreman searches for her family with Wilson, eventually discovering that the woman became homeless after losing her husband and son in a car accident two years earlier. To give her peace as she dies, Foreman pretends to be her husband and forgives her. Final diagnosis: Tuberculoma and rabies
11	11	"Detox"	Nelson McCormick	Lawrence Kaplow & Thomas L. Moran	February 15, 2005	14.22
While trying to figure out why a young patient (Nicholas D'Agosto) will not stop bleeding after getting into a car wreck with his girlfriend (Amanda Seyfried), House accepts Cuddy's challenge and goes off Vicodin for a week in exchange for no clinic duty for a month. As House's withdrawal symptoms become severe, his methodology for his patient is more harsh and risky, and Foreman and Cameron are afraid he may not be thinking clearly enough in order to save the patient's life. House does solve the case though by exhuming the family's recently deceased cat and performing an autopsy on it. He finds high doses of naphthalene, which is excreted by termites as a repellent. The patient has been exposed to the poisonous vapors due to a termite nest behind the walls of his bedroom. Final diagnosis: Naphthalene poisoning
12	12	"Sports Medicine"	Keith Gordon	John Mankiewicz & David Shore	February 22, 2005	15.53
A severely broken arm reveals a bizarre case of bone loss and ends the comeback plans of major league pitcher Hank Wiggen (Scott Foley). House suspects Hank – with a history of drug abuse – is lying about using steroids, as his condition worsens. When Hank's kidneys start to fail, his wife (Meredith Monroe) offers to donate hers, but she will have to abort her early pregnancy, something Hank does not want. Eventually House finds out the wife suffers from loss of smell, indicating the pair have smoked cannabis which was grown on cadmium polluted soil. Meanwhile, Foreman dates a pharmaceutical representative and House goes to a monster truck rally with Cameron. This episode features a cameo appearance by the series' director and executive producer Bryan Singer. Final diagnosis: Cadmium poisoning
13	13	"Cursed"	Daniel Sackheim	Matt Witten & Peter Blake	March 1, 2005	15.63
After consulting a Ouija board, a young boy (Daryl Sabara) believes he is going to die, and is sent to Princeton-Plainsboro after suffering from pneumonia. Meanwhile, Chase's estranged father (Patrick Bauchau) comes to the hospital and helps House and his team diagnose the kid. Suspicious of Chase's father's seemingly random visit, House questions him and he reveals that he has terminal cancer. Chase and his father briefly reconcile before his father departs by taxi for the airport. Final diagnosis: Anthrax and leprosy
14	14	"Control"	Randy Zisk	Lawrence Kaplow	March 15, 2005	17.33
Billionaire entrepreneur Edward Vogler (Chi McBride) donates $100 million to Princeton-Plainsboro, officially becoming the new Chairman of the Board. Vogler intends to turn the clinic into a profitable venue for his biotech venture and also plans to eliminate House's financially draining department for good. Meanwhile, a businesswoman (Sarah Clarke) has it all – perfect life, perfect body, perfect job – until she finds herself inexplicably paralyzed. When he diagnoses her condition, House must risk his job and his medical license to save her. Final diagnosis: Congestive heart failure onset by bulimia and regular use of ipecac
15	15	"Mob Rules"	Tim Hunter	David Foster & John Mankiewicz	March 22, 2005	17.34
House is placed under a court order to determine what is ailing mobster Joey Arnello (Joseph Lyle Taylor), who is due for federal testimony and the Witness Protection Program. The witness' brother, a lawyer, works against the team and the testimony when his brother is diagnosed with Hepatitis C. Cuddy continues to battle Vogler over House's importance to the hospital. Final diagnosis: Ornithine transcarbamylase deficiency
16	16	"Heavy"	Fred Gerber	Thomas L. Moran	March 29, 2005	18.28
House and his team investigate an overweight ten-year-old girl (Jennifer Stone) who has a heart attack and her mother (Cynthia Ettinger) insists that House and his team look past her weight to find the diagnosis. Adding to his stress, Vogler demands House get rid of a member of his team. It is revealed that Chase has been feeding Vogler information about House's cases. When House tells Cuddy and Vogler he chooses to fire Chase, Vogler rebuffs him and tells him to choose Foreman or Cameron instead. Final diagnosis: Cushing's disease
17	17	"Role Model"	Peter O'Fallon	Matt Witten	April 12, 2005	17.83
A popular U.S. senator (Joe Morton) and presidential candidate succumbs to illness at a fundraiser and Vogler assigns House to his case. He also tells House he can keep his whole team if he endorses Vogler's pharmaceutical company. The Senator's initial diagnosis seems to point to AIDS, but House digs deeper for another answer. Meanwhile, he also handles a case of a woman who apparently gets pregnant without having sex. House deduces that Chase is Vogler's mole. House insults Vogler and his company during the speech, reigniting their feud. Cameron leaves the team and quits. Final diagnosis: Toxoplasmosis and delayed-onset CVID secondary to phenytoin-mediated Epstein-Barr virus infection.
18	18	"Babies & Bathwater"	Bill Johnson	Story by : Peter Blake; Teleplay by : Peter Blake & David Shore	April 19, 2005	17.48
House informs Chase and Foreman that Cameron quit. A pregnant woman (Marin Hinkle) arrives at the hospital with brain and kidney problems and House must contend with her condition and Vogler's eagerness to see the doctor removed by using the board members. The patient and her husband must decide between her life and their unborn child's, after the team discovers small cell lung cancer. Vogler proposes that the board revoke House's tenure and fire him but Wilson opposes. Vogler then proposes that the board remove Wilson, which they do, to which Wilson resigns. At the following meeting, Cuddy responds to Vogler's proposal by asserting that he too is out of control and the board members are subservient to his desires. Four other board members agree causing Vogler to leave as chairman and revoke his $100 million donation. The team celebrates Vogler's departure with champagne as Cuddy reminds House this conflict was unnecessary but caused by his temperament. At the clinic, a malnourished baby is presented to House with pneumonia. The parents are arrested and charged with child endangerment under the assumption it was caused by their and the baby's vegan diet. The charges are revoked after a CT scan reveals the baby has DiGeorge syndrome, causing the malnourishment. Final diagnosis: LEMS secondary to small cell lung carcinoma
19	19	"Kids"	Deran Sarafian	Thomas L. Moran & Lawrence Kaplow	May 3, 2005	17.14
House fights off a meningitis outbreak and Cuddy gives his team an hour to produce results after he singles out a young patient (Skye McCole Bartusiak) who does not quite fit the criteria. House tries to get Cameron to return in the wake of Vogler's departure, but she demands House tell her why he really wants her back. House and Wilson interview potential replacements for Cameron's position. Cameron agrees to return in exchange for a dinner date with House. Final diagnosis: Thrombotic thrombocytopenic purpura secondary to pregnancy
20	20	"Love Hurts"	Bryan Spicer	Sara B. Cooper	May 10, 2005	18.80
The hospital buzzes with rumors of House's upcoming date with Cameron. After House is harsh to an awaiting clinic patient (John Cho), the man develops a mysterious stroke. At the same time, House also deals with an elderly couple whose overactive sex life is seemingly causing them problems. Final diagnosis: Fulminating osteomyelitis
21	21	"Three Stories"	Paris Barclay	David Shore	May 17, 2005	17.68
House receives a visit from an ex-girlfriend, Stacy Warner, who seeks his help for her husband, Mark. In the meantime, Cuddy forces House to give a lecture to medical students on diagnosing patients and presents three scenarios, each with different reasons for their leg pain (with guest star Carmen Electra). Final diagnosis: Streptococcal infection (farmer), osteosarcoma (volleyball player), Thigh muscle infarction (House) and lead paint poisoning (Professor Riley)
22	22	"Honeymoon"	Frederick King Keller	Lawrence Kaplow & John Mankiewicz	May 24, 2005	19.52
House diagnoses Mark (Currie Graham), Stacy Warner's husband. Although the tests do not indicate a condition and Mark claims to be fine outside of stomach pain, it appears his brain is dying. House finds abdominal epilepsy, but cannot detect any memory loss. After Mark begins developing paralysis, House decides to treat him for Guillain–Barré syndrome. After confiding in Stacy that he still has feelings for her, House realizes that Mark had experienced delusions, and actually suffered from acute intermittent porphyria (AIP). With support from Stacy, but not from his team, House gives Mark a dangerous drug cocktail to confirm that he really has AIP. Cuddy decides to hire Stacy as the hospital's lawyer. Final diagnosis: Acute intermittent porphyria

== Cast and characters ==
=== Main cast ===
- Hugh Laurie as Dr. Gregory House
- Lisa Edelstein as Dr. Lisa Cuddy
- Omar Epps as Dr. Eric Foreman
- Robert Sean Leonard as Dr. James Wilson
- Jennifer Morrison as Dr. Allison Cameron (episodes 1–17 and 19–22)
- Jesse Spencer as Dr. Robert Chase

=== Recurring cast ===
- Chi McBride as Edward Vogler
- Sela Ward as Stacy Warner
- Stephanie Venditto as Nurse Brenda Previn
- Kenneth Choi as Dr. Lim
- Ron Perkins as Dr. Ron Simpson
- Currie Graham as Mark Warner
- Maurice Godin as Dr. Lawrence Hourani

=== Guest cast ===
Andrew Airlie, John Patrick Amedori, Skye McCole Bartusiak, Patrick Bauchau, Nicole Bilderback, Brandy, Hedy Burress, Nestor Carbonell, Ever Carradine, John Cho, Sarah Clarke, David Conrad, Christina Cox, Missy Crider, Myndy Crist, Nicholas D'Agosto, Ann Dowd, Stacy Edwards, Carmen Electra, Cynthia Ettinger, Scott Foley, Erin Foster, Kurt Fuller, Wendy Gazelle, Michael A. Goorjian, Peter Graves, Stanislav Grof, Mark Harelik, Roxanne Hart, David Henrie, Aaron Himelstein, Marin Hinkle, Leslie Hope, Lucinda Jenney, Andrew Keegan, Shirley Knight, Harry Lennix, Eddie McClintock, Scott Mechlowicz, Tracy Middendorf, Elizabeth Mitchell, Meredith Monroe, Joe Morton, Danny Nucci, Faith Prince, Dominic Purcell, Daryl Sabara, Amanda Seyfried, Alex Skuby, Jennifer Stone, Robin Thomas, Sam Trammell, Robin Tunney, Kristoffer Ryan Winters, Kevin Zegers, and Josh Zuckerman.

== Reception ==
Season one gained high Nielsen ratings, averaging 13.3 million viewers an episode. It was the 24th most-watched television show of the 2004–2005 television season.

Hugh Laurie submitted the episode "Detox" for consideration at the 57th Primetime Emmy Awards in 2005. This resulted in his first Emmy Award nomination, for Outstanding Lead Actor in a Drama Series for his role as Dr. Gregory House.

== Home media ==
Set details				Special features
Country	North America	United Kingdom	Australia	Bonus Featurettes: Dr. House; Medical cases; Casting session with Hugh Laurie; The Concept; Set Tour; House-isms
# episodes	22			Bonus Featurettes: Dr. House; Medical cases; Casting session with Hugh Laurie; The Concept; Set Tour; House-isms
Aspect ratio	1.78:1	1.33:1		Bonus Featurettes: Dr. House; Medical cases; Casting session with Hugh Laurie; The Concept; Set Tour; House-isms
Running time	972 minutes	999 minutes	972 minutes	Bonus Featurettes: Dr. House; Medical cases; Casting session with Hugh Laurie; The Concept; Set Tour; House-isms
Audio	Dolby Digital 5.1			Bonus Featurettes: Dr. House; Medical cases; Casting session with Hugh Laurie; The Concept; Set Tour; House-isms
Subtitles	English, Spanish	—N/a	none	Bonus Featurettes: Dr. House; Medical cases; Casting session with Hugh Laurie; The Concept; Set Tour; House-isms
# of discs	3	6		Bonus Featurettes: Dr. House; Medical cases; Casting session with Hugh Laurie; The Concept; Set Tour; House-isms
Region	1 (NTSC)	2 (PAL)	4 (PAL)	Bonus Featurettes: Dr. House; Medical cases; Casting session with Hugh Laurie; The Concept; Set Tour; House-isms
Rating	NOT RATED	15	M	Bonus Featurettes: Dr. House; Medical cases; Casting session with Hugh Laurie; The Concept; Set Tour; House-isms
Release date	August 30, 2005	February 27, 2006	July 12, 2006	Bonus Featurettes: Dr. House; Medical cases; Casting session with Hugh Laurie; The Concept; Set Tour; House-isms

The Region 1 DVD set of Season 1 was issued in non-anamorphic widescreen (meaning those with widescreen TVs would have to use the Zoom button for the show to fit their screen properly, causing the picture to be blurry) on 3 double-sided discs. However, Universal reissued the Season 1 set on February 10, 2009, in the correct anamorphic widescreen aspect ratio, which is now on 6 single-sided discs instead of the 3 double-sided ones.
