= Paternity =

Paternity may refer to:

- Father, the male parent of a child
- Paternity (law), fatherhood as a matter of law
- Paternity (film), a 1981 comedy film starring Burt Reynolds
- "Paternity" (House), a 2004 episode of the television series House

== See also ==
- Parental leave, also called paternity leave, a leave of absence taken to allow a father to attend to family needs associated with fatherhood
