= SSPE =

SSPE may refer to:

- Subacute sclerosing panencephalitis - A terminal disease of the brain caused by a rare complication of a measles infection.
- Securitisation Special Purpose Entity - A common type of special purpose entity used to securitise loans or other receivables.
