= Cat Run 2 =

- Directed by: John Stockwell
- Written by: Andrew Manson; Matt Manson
- Produced by: Bill Perkins; Bic Tran
- Starring: Scott Mechlowicz; Winter Ave Zoli; Alphonso McAuley; Leonardo Nam; Gregory Alan Williams
- Cinematography: Peter A. Holland
- Edited by: Ben Callahan
- Music by: Claude Foisy
- Production company: Lleju Productions
- Distributed by: Universal Studios Home Entertainment
- Release date: August 26, 2014
- Running time: 97 minutes
- Country: United States
- Language: English
- Budget: $2 million

Cat Run 2 is a 2014 direct-to-video American comedy action film sequel of Cat Run directed by John Stockwell starring Scott Mechlowicz, Winter Ave Zoli, Alphonso McAuley.

== Plot ==
Two assassin sisters Tatiana (Winter Ave Zoli) and Mina (Maria Rogers), disguised as Russian sex workers, arrive in New Orleans working under Cordray (Dan Bilzerian) in a strip club. The pair are hired by U.S. military soldiers for a "sex party" where they infiltrate the base and attempt to steal military secrets by storing it in a USB drive. After a massacre, Mina is killed and Tatiana escapes leaving Wilson (Thomas Tah Hyde III), one of the soldiers wounded. Back in New York City two private investigators, Anthony (Scott Mechlowicz) and Julian (Alphonso McAuley), attempt to start a restaurant before being selected to participate in a cooking contest in New Orleans.

Julian's family resides in New Orleans where the pair find residence until the contest. Wilson, who is Julian's cousin, returns home with memory loss. The pair decide to investigate and uncovers a military secret involving the creation of supersoldiers. The duo follow their lead to Cordray's strip club and interrogated him. They discover the morgue housing Mina's body. After a close encounter with Tatiana who returns for the USB drive, the pair return to their New Orleans home. Tatiana contacts her handler, Dragnovic (Lawrence P. Beron), only to find the information in the USB incomplete. She returns to Cordray's club and kills him for his betrayal.

While being hunted by assassins, Julian discovers his childhood friend Simone (Brittany S. Hall) has a professor with knowledge regarding the conspiracy. They are tipped off to the location of the Wollcroft (Vanessa Branch), Dragnovic's partner. Anthony, Julian and Simone arrive at the mansion where Wollcroft is located and Anthony confides to Tatiana his knowledge of her past sparking a connection between the two. Wollcroft makes a separate deal with the Chinese government involving powered exoskeletons betraying Dragnovic and killing him. Wollcroft now in a powered exoskeleton fights Tatiana who attempts to avenge the death of Dragnovic. Despite the suit's enhancement, Wollcroft is outmatched and killed by Tatiana.

Anthony and Julian win the cooking contest and returns to New York City. Tatiana secretly enters Anthony's home one night and the two have sex.

== Cast ==
- Scott Mechlowicz as Anthony Hester
- Alphonso McAuley as Julian Simms
- Winter Ave Zoli as Tatiana
- Vanessa Branch as Wollcroft
- Gregory Alan Williams as Ray Boudreaux
- Maria Rogers as Mina
- Thomas Tah Hyde III as Wilson

== Production ==
Cat Run 2 was filmed in New Orleans.

== Release ==
Cat Run 2 was released August 26, 2014.
