= Cat Run =

- Directed by: John Stockwell
- Written by: Nick Ball; John Niven
- Produced by: Bill Perkins; Ram Bergman; Derrick Borte
- Starring: Paz Vega; Janet McTeer; Alphonso McAuley; Scott Mechlowicz; Christopher McDonald; Karel Roden; D. L. Hughley; Tony Curran; Michelle Lombardo
- Cinematography: Jean-François Hensgens
- Edited by: Ben Callahan
- Music by: Devin Powers
- Production company: Lleju Productions
- Distributed by: Eagle Films (United States); Universal Pictures (International)
- Release date: April 1, 2011
- Running time: 102 minutes
- Country: United States
- Language: English
- Box office: $30,000 (US)

Cat Run is a 2011 American comedy action film directed by John Stockwell.

== Plot ==
Andorran prostitute and single mother Catalina "Cat" Rona is hired to participate in an orgy in Montenegro along with other escorts, for powerful men including former U.S. Senator William Krebb. When the senator kills one of the women, security is ordered to murder the others present to avoid witnesses. However, Cat escapes with security footage of what happened contained on an encrypted hard disk drive. An official manhunt for Cat ensues, having been framed with false charges, and the cruel assassin Helen Bingham is hired to retrieve the HDD and kill Cat. Meanwhile, Americans Julian Simms and Anthony Hester decide to open a detective agency to raise money. When they read in the newspaper that Cat is wanted by the police, they decide to seek her out, expecting to receive a reward. However, they cross the path of Helen and they end up helping protect Cat from the killer. When Helen is betrayed by those who hired her, she decides to help Anthony, Julian, and Cat retrieve the HDD and their freedom.

== Cast ==
- Paz Vega as Catalina Rona
- Janet McTeer as Helen Bingham
- Alphonso McAuley as Julian Simms
- Scott Mechlowicz as Anthony Hester
- Christopher McDonald as William 'Bill' Krebb
- Karel Roden as Carver
- D. L. Hughley as Dexter
- Tony Curran as Sean Moody
- Michelle Lombardo as Stephanie
- Heather Chasen as Bingham's Mum
- Branko Đurić as himself

== Production ==
Cat Run was shot in Serbia and Montenegro.

== Release ==
Cat Run was released April 1, 2011. It grossed $30,000 domestically. Universal released it on home video on June 19, 2012.

== Reception ==
Rotten Tomatoes, a review aggregator, reports that 20% of 15 surveyed critics gave the film a positive review; the average rating was 3.6/10. Metacritic rated it 33/100 based on nine reviews. John Anderson of Variety called it "an often stylish but wearying action thriller that fails even to be convincingly tongue-in-cheek." Todd McCarthy of The Hollywood Reporter called it "a self-consciously sleazy comic crime saga composed of facetious elements whose shelf life has long since passed." Mark Olsen of the Los Angeles Times called it a return to "late-'90s post-Tarantino crime thrillers" that are "cut-rate knockoffs" of Quentin Tarantino's style. Scott Tobias of The A.V. Club rated it C+ and called it a "generic 'hip' thriller" that is well-suited to late-night cable. Gerard Iribe of DVD Talk rated it 1.5/5 stars and called it "the poor man's version of Smokin' Aces". Paul Pritchard of DVD Verdict wrote, "It lacks a unique voice, and though it does entertain in bursts, it is overlong and frequently guilty of lacking direction."

== Sequel ==
Cat Run was followed by the 2014 sequel Cat Run 2, with Scott Mechlowicz and Alphonso McAuley reprising their roles as Anthony and Julian.
