= SkyFi =

American satellite imagery company

- Type: Private
- Industry: Geospatial intelligence
- Founded: 2021
- Founders: Bill Perkins; Luke Fischer
- Key people: Luke Fischer (CEO)
- Website: skyfi.com

SkyFi is an American geospatial technology company based in Austin, Texas, that provides access to commercial satellite and aerial imagery and related analytics through an online platform.

SkyFi was founded in 2021 by the energy trader Bill Perkins and Luke Fischer, a former United States Army special operations officer. It raised US$12.7 million in Series A funding in January 2026.

== History ==
SkyFi was founded in 2021 in Austin, Texas, by entrepreneur Bill Perkins and technology executive Luke Fischer. Perkins bought commercial satellite imagery for investment research and found the process fragmented, slow and difficult without existing relationships with satellite operators. Fischer joined him to build one platform for searching, buying and tasking imagery. Fischer has said he served 20 years in the Army, 16 of them on active duty, and then worked in venture capital. SpaceNews has described him as a former special operations aviator. The SKYFI trademark was filed on November 19, 2021, and registered on January 30, 2024. The company was incorporated in December 2021.

In February 2022, SkyFi raised US$7.15 million from J2 Ventures, Moving Capital, Capital Factory and Perkins. In September 2022, it released a test version of its application. The web and mobile applications opened to the public in January 2023. In May 2023, SkyFi raised US$7 million in a seed round. In September 2023 it added free Sentinel-2 imagery and an analytics service called SkyFi Insights. In 2024 and 2025 it added providers and analytical products, and its catalog covered optical, synthetic-aperture radar (SAR), hyperspectral and aerial imagery.

Buoyant Ventures and IronGate Capital Advisors led the January 2026 Series A. TechCrunch reported that the round was oversubscribed and that investors were interested in platforms combining satellite imagery with artificial-intelligence analytics. Axios reported rising demand for commercial overhead imagery and geospatial intelligence.

== Platform ==
Customers buy archived imagery or pay a participating operator to attempt a new collection, and can compare prices from several providers without contracting with each. Products include optical, SAR, hyperspectral, thermal, multispectral, stereo and video imagery, delivered as GeoTIFF files or to cloud storage.

The platform launched with more than a dozen suppliers, including Satellogic, Umbra and Pixxel. In August 2026 it listed more than 300 imagery and aerial sources.

SkyFi builds analytics for commercial and government customers from its network's imagery and from data on customer requests, and TechCrunch reported that demand grew as it added them. A 2025 CBS Austin report showed analyses of soil moisture, building counts and vessel detection. Payload Space wrote that the company was moving from supplying data toward answering customer questions by combining imagery from several operators, which it said reduced the cost and complexity of geospatial analysis. Fischer told the publication that governments that buy their own satellites often lack tools to analyze the data.

In August 2026 SkyFi released Rowan, which searches imagery archives in response to natural-language queries and compares availability, resolution and price. SpaceNews reported that it was intended for users without specialist knowledge of sensors or geographic information systems.

=== Suppliers ===
SI Imaging Services added KOMPSAT imagery in October 2022, and the Japanese operator Axelspace added its imagery the same month. Satellogic opened its satellites to direct tasking in March 2023, and the aerial survey company Bluesky added its photography in April 2023. A 2024 paper in IEEE Journal of Selected Topics in Applied Earth Observations and Remote Sensing reported that Umbra's radar archive on the platform held more than 10,000 images. More than 200 collections were being added each week. Vantor imagery was added in January 2026, when suppliers also included Planet, ICEYE US, Near Space Labs, Umbra and Synspective.

== Customers ==
SkyFi first aimed at individuals, enterprises, and United States government and defense organizations. Its target commercial sectors included agriculture, mining, finance and insurance. Some bought imagery to analyze themselves and others bought SkyFi's analytics. The company said it had customers in more than 185 countries, and Payload Space reported increased demand from financial and energy companies for work such as finding revenue opportunities and monitoring operating costs.

Quartz published satellite photographs bought through SkyFi in June 2024 that showed unsold Tesla vehicles in parking lots. Bellingcat lists SkyFi in its online investigation toolkit. Axios reported that commercial overhead imagery, once used mainly by specialists, was being bought by agricultural users and open-source intelligence researchers.

=== Government and defense ===
In May 2025, the Defense Innovation Unit named SkyFi among companies newly awarded contracts under its Hybrid Space Architecture program. In March 2025 the United States Space Force's Tactical Surveillance Reconnaissance and Tracking program used SkyFi data for an information product on flooding in Argentina.

In May 2026, United States Special Operations Command gave SkyFi a contract of undisclosed value to build a prototype. It would give military personnel access to commercial imagery and let users in the field request new collections. Payload Space called it a sovereign intelligence platform. The prototype includes a plug-in for the Android Tactical Assault Kit (ATAK), which United States government organizations use for mission planning and operational awareness. The system would deliver unclassified imagery through web and ATAK applications and match military requests with commercial providers.

In December 2025, NATO's Defence Innovation Accelerator for the North Atlantic (DIANA) chose SkyFi for its 2026 cohort. In June 2026 SkyFi, Fieldmade, JET Connectivity, Mesodyne and Spacedrip were the first five companies from the 150-member cohort selected for DIANA's Mission Track program. The cohort had been chosen from more than 3,600 applications.

== Funding ==
Year	Round	Amount	Lead investors	Reported purpose	Ref.
2022	Seed	US$7.15 million, closed at US$10 million	J2 Ventures, Moving Capital, Capital Factory	Application launch	
2023	Seed	US$7 million	Balerion Space Ventures	Platform, enterprise API and provider network	
2026	Series A	US$12.7 million	Buoyant Ventures, IronGate Capital Advisors	Analytics, artificial intelligence, commercial and government services	

== See also ==
- Geospatial intelligence
- Remote sensing
- Satellite imagery
