= Naphthalene poisoning =

Form of poisoning

Naphthalene poisoning (or mothball poisoning) is a form of poisoning that occurs when naphthalene is ingested. Severe poisoning can result in haemolytic anaemia. Naphthalene was introduced in 1841 by Rossbach as an antiseptic to counteract typhoid fever. Although naphthalene was widely used industrially, only nine cases of poisoning have been reported since 1947 as of 1956, suggesting underdiagnosis of the condition. As a result, the condition has limited coverage within medical journals.

== Sources of Exposure ==
Until the late 1950s coal tar was the principal source of naphthalene. From 1981 to 1983 the U.S. National Institute for Occupational Safety and Health found over 100,000 workers were potentially exposed to toxic levels of naphthalene, working primarily for major industrial and agricultural businesses. Exposure may often be a result of oral ingestion, inhalation, or through prolonged skin exposure.

=== Industrial chemistry ===
Naphthalene is a precursor in the production of phthalic anhydride. This application has been displaced by alternative technologies.

=== Mothballs ===
Naphthalene is a major component of some mothballs. It repels moths as well as some animals.

Since mothballs that contain naphthalene are considered hazards, safer alternatives have been developed, such as the use of 1,4-dichlorobenzene, however, 1,4-dichlorobenzene has been declared as a potential neurotoxin. 1,4-dichlorobenzene has been linked to potentially causing depression as a form of encephalopathy. This complication resulted with an increased use of Camphor as a moth repellent. Camphor is frequently used in place of naphthalene in Asia.

==== Regulation ====
The European Union enforced a ban on the distribution and production of mothballs containing naphthalene in 2008, as a part of the new regulations of the Registration, Evaluation and Authorisation of Chemicals (REACH), regulating chemical use within its representative countries.

In 2014, New Zealand banned the distribution of mothballs. Mothballs are restricted within Australia, only being distributed in forms that prevent them from being ingested.

=== Tobacco ===
Tobacco is also a source of exposure, creating an estimated range of 0.3 to 4 micrograms of naphthalene inhalation per cigarette that is consumed. A regular pack a day smoker on average would be inhaling amounts of 6-80 micrograms of naphthalene daily, which is a small and negligible amount of naphthalene, and is similar in magnitude to normal exposure near highways and areas where car exhaust is frequently inhaled or consumed. The naphthalene within cigarettes is different to other sources of naphthalene. The naphthalene that is produced in cigarette smoke is bound to other particles and is not presented as a free vapour, meaning the exposure is small. Naphthalene exposure is usually insignificant unless exposed to large amounts of naphthalene within production or being near proximity of a product that contains naphthalene. Naphthalene levels within an area are very unstable and frequently change over time and space. Due to this variance, sampling protocols must be conducted carefully and are usually analysed using different analytical methods.

=== Natural occurrence ===
Naphthalene has also been found to be secreted by termites in order to protect their nests. The termites use naphthalene to repel ants and any intruders who try to invade their nests. This naphthalene produced is not only toxic for the insects but can also affect humans in the same way. Naphthalene poisoning via termite nest was featured in the eleventh episode of the first season of the American television medical drama House, "Detox", where the final diagnosis ended up as acute naphthalene poisoning as a result of a termite nest being contained within the walls of the patient's bedroom, leading him to inhale naphthalene in his sleep and become sick.

== Treatment ==
Treatment of naphthalene toxicity usually follows the same treatments involved for haemolytic anaemia, which involves a series of blood transfusions, in order to restore healthy levels of haemoglobin. This may include intravenous methylene blue and ascorbic acid. The methylene blue allows the methaemoglobin to be converted to haemoglobin. Supportive treatment is also usually provided, depending on the severity of the toxicity, that resulted in the anaemia.

Ascorbic acid is used to treat methemoglobinemia, a symptom of naphthalene poisoning and is used when methylene blue is not available, or in conjunction with methylene blue in order to restore haemoglobin count.

== Mechanisms of toxicity ==
According to the International Agency for Research on Cancer, naphthalene is possibly carcinogenic to humans (Group 2B), as there is inadequate evidence in humans for the carcinogenicity of naphthalene, however there is sufficient evidence in experimental animals for the carcinogenicity of naphthalene. The carcinogenicity was tested on rats in mice, via intraperitoneal administration and subcutaneous administration, of newborns and adult rats, providing evidence of tumours. The IARC also discovered that naphthalene toxicity also had potential to cause cataracts in humans, rats, rabbits and mice, however the tests were considered inefficient to substantiate a diagnosis resulting in naphthalene as a potential carcinogen classification. Likewise, the European Chemical agency classified naphthalene as Group C, a possible human carcinogen. This was classified due to lack of evidence of naphthalene alone causing carcinogenic properties in rats, and limited human contact with naphthalene within industrial environments.

Haemolysis occurs either through haemoglobin defects, such as formation of Heinz bodies, or cell membrane defects, especially those with glucose-6-phosphate dehydrogenase deficiency and a low tolerance to oxidative stress. This haemolysis is usually accompanied by neurological effects such as vertigo, lethargy and convulsions, usually caused by cerebral edema. Gastrointestinal bleeding may also appear as a symptom after ingestion of mothballs, especially for those who are younger.

Acute exposure to naphthalene is unlikely to cause toxicity and must be ingested unless prolonged contact is provided along the skin or eyes. After ingestion of mothballs containing naphthalene, symptoms of haemolytic anaemia are presented and treated normally through the use of methylene blue and regular blood transfusions, and patients are usually released after 6–10 days depending on their haemoglobin levels.

Repeated naphthalene exposure has also been found to potentially cause airway epithelial damage, aberrant repair, and inflammation. Greater numbers of peribronchial Mac-3-positive macrophages and CD3-positive T-cells were observed throughout the airways which displays acute inflammation within the airways.

Naphthalene metabolites of 1,2-hydroxynaphthalene has also been found to be a mechanism of oxidative DNA damage within humans. In the presence of the reduced form of nicotinamide adenine dinucleotide (NADH). The damaging activity of the DNA of the activity of 1,2-hydroxynaphthalene was observed at much larger levels. 1,2-hydroxynaphthalene is reduced by NADH to be formed as a part of the redox cycle, resulting in the speeding up of DNA damage, however, this is only presented within larger prolonged exposure to naphthalene, values that are unrealistic for any individual not working near a place where naphthalene production occurs.

=== Biomarkers of excessive exposure ===
1,2-Dihydroxynaphthalene has been used as a potential biomarker of excessive exposure to naphthalene levels and was tested on smokers and those exposed to naphthalene among the working population. After collecting the urine samples of multiple workers, Median 1,2-Dihydroxynaphthalene values were 1012 micrograms per litre for those exposed to naphthalene and 8 micrograms per litre for those who were in the control group indicating that it is useful as a biomarker for exposure within humans. The median results for the concentrations of 1,2-Dihydroxynaphthalene were about ten times the amount of the standard markers of 1-naphthol and 2-naphthol within human urine.
