= Love That Girl! =

American television sitcom (2010–2014)

- Genre: Sitcom
- Created by: Bentley Kyle Evans
- Starring: Tatyana Ali; Bresha Webb; Phil Morris; Mark Adair-Rios; Alphonso McAuley; Peter Oldring; Huggy Lowdown; Kendyll Joi; Reagan Gomez-Preston
- Country of origin: United States
- Original language: English
- No. of seasons: 4
- No. of episodes: 63 (list of episodes)

Production
- Executive producers: Bentley Kyle Evans; Jeff Franklin; Trenten Gumbs; Martin Lawrence
- Camera setup: Multiple
- Running time: 22 minutes
- Production companies: 3G Films; Bent Outta Shape Productions; Hazrah Entertainment; Runteldat Entertainment

Original release
- Network: TV One
- Release: January 19, 2010 – September 25, 2014

Love That Girl! is an American television sitcom that aired on TV One from January 19, 2010, to September 25, 2014. The series started off as a four episode, independently produced series presentation that aired as a special three-night event, and was later ordered to series on October 15, 2010. Love That Girl! is the first scripted series for the network. The series went on hiatus until TV One announced in May 2013, that the series would return for its fourth season on October 11, 2013. Tatyana Ali did not return for the fourth season due to a contract agreement with the BET series, Second Generation Wayans.

== Plot ==
Seasons 1 to 3 revolve around Tyana Jones (Tatyana Ali), a recent young divorcee returning to southern California who is in search of new independence, a new career and a new chapter in her book of life. In Season 4, Imunique (Bresha Webb) is still working at Del-Jones Realty while Latrell (Alphonso McAuley) is continuing on jump-starting his stand-up comedian career. The new member of the cast is Jasmine Russell (Reagan Gomez); she is Delroy’s niece from Ohio, who relocated to Los Angeles in hopes of becoming a sports reporter.

== Cast ==
- Tatyana Ali (seasons 1–3), as Tyana Jones
- Bresha Webb as Immunique Jefferson
- Phil Morris as Delroy Jones
- Mark Adair-Rios as Adonis
- Alphonso McAuley as Latrell Jones
- Peter Oldring as Fabian
- Huggy Lowdown as himself
- Kendyll Joi (seasons 1–3), as Nefertiti Carter
- Reagan Gomez-Preston (season 4) as Jasmine Russel

== Episodes ==
=== Series overview ===
Season	Episodes	Originally released	
Season	Episodes	First released	Last released
1	4	January 19, 2010	January 21, 2010
2	13	January 10, 2011	April 4, 2011
3	13	October 17, 2011	January 2, 2012
4	33	October 11, 2013	September 25, 2014

=== Season 1: 2010 ===
No. overall	No. in season	Title	Original release date
1	1	"Pilot"	January 19, 2010
Tyana Jones (Tatyana Ali) returns to Los Angeles, newly-single after a recent divorce, ready to start the next phase of her life. Before she can get comfy in her new condo, her vagabond brother Latrell (Alphonso McAuley) pays a surprise visit for an extended stay with his sister. Tyana's father, Delroy Jones (Phil Morris) is thrilled to have his "Babygirl" close to home and happier to discover her plans to follow in his professional footsteps until he discovers her plans to work for the competition.
2	2	"My Guy Friend"	January 19, 2010
Tyana's old childhood friend, Guy (Wesley Jonathan) is coming to town along with his new fiancée (Shanti Lowry) and she decides to throw a small dinner party to celebrate their engagement. Things get out of hand when Guy's stuffy fiancée discovers a few secrets about Tyana and Guy's past. Guy decides to call the engagement off and runs to Tyana for encouragement.
3	3	"Keep It in the Closet"	January 20, 2010
Latrell has a sexy new girlfriend Alexis (Caryn Ward) and everything is cozy until he learns that Sexy Lexi has a secret passion.
4	4	"My Sister's Keeper?"	January 21, 2010
Tyana and Latrell get a surprise visit from a woman who claims that they all may have something in common — the same father. When Delroy confirms that the woman (Faune Chambers) is his love child, the entire family is shocked to learn of her reason for the visit.

=== Season 2: 2011 ===
No. overall	No. in season	Title	Original release date
5	1	"Don't Stop Til Get You Enough"	January 10, 2011
Tyana takes a walk on the wild side when she engages in an "open house rendezvous" with slick real estate agent Chance Brown. A rival real estate agent, Curtis Williams, threatens to go public with the videotaped evidence of Tyana’s tryst unless she is willing to give up her commissions from the sale of the house.
6	2	"Break of Dawn"	January 10, 2011
Delroy’s huge real estate venture is jeopardized when Tyana goes with his business partner’s daughter to a pole dance. class.
7	3	"Will You Be There"	January 17, 2011
Latrell’s relationship with his family and friends is strained when he uses material from their lives for his stand-up comedy act.
8	4	"Torture"	January 24, 2011
Tyana gets more than she bargained for when her sister Kelly asks her to be the maid-of-honor at her upcoming wedding and turns into a Bridezilla.
9	5	"Beat It"	January 31, 2011
Tyana’s extravagant godmother, Miss Earlene pays a visit and turns her life upside down.
10	6	"A Fool for You"	February 7, 2011
Tyana finds love at a speed-dating event, until she finds out her new guy is a professional clown.
11	7	"Wanna Be Startin' Something"	February 14, 2011
The strength of their friendship is tested when Tyana lends Nefertiti money.
12	8	"Remember the Time"	February 21, 2011
Some secrets are revealed when Tyana discovers a new client’s husband was "the one that got away" when she was in college.
13	9	"In the Closet"	February 28, 2011
Tyana poses as Fabian’s (Peter Oldring) fiancé until he can tell his very conservative parents he’s gay.
14	10	"P.Y.T."	March 7, 2011
Tyana discovers that her father, Delroy is dating a much younger woman who is secretly married and decides she must confront the woman and tell her father the truth.
15	11	"Maybe Tomorrow"	March 21, 2011
Latrell is on a mission to meet Charlie Murphy and get some stand-up comedy tips.
16	12	"If I Have to Move a Mountain"	March 28, 2011
Charlie Murphy sees Latrell perform stand-up and offers him the opening gig on his tour.
17	13	"Heartbreak Hotel"	April 4, 2011
Latrell's new-found success goes to his head and Tyana kicks him out of the condo.

=== Season 3: 2011-2012 ===
No. overall	No. in season	Title	Original release date
18	1	"Dilemma Date"	October 17, 2011
Nef dates a guy that Tyana met and went out with first.
19	2	"Director's Cut"	October 17, 2011
Tyana sets up a real estate deal for a wealthy director; Latrell starts a job as a personal trainer.
20	3	"Trick or Treat"	October 24, 2011
Recounting scary events at the DNA Lounge.
21	4	"Fighting Shape"	October 31, 2011
Tyana takes kickboxing lessons; Latrell asks Delroy for a job.
22	5	"Head Shrunk"	November 7, 2011
Tyana sees a therapist who suggests that she move on by calling her ex-husbands2.
23	6	"Happy Birthday, Bro"	November 14, 2011
Tyana's discovers Delroy's long last brother; Jimi tries reunting the brothers.
24	7	"Fatal Attractions"	November 21, 2011
Delroy's ex from high school is in town to nekindle their relationship.
25	8	"Thug Passions"	November 28, 2011
Tyana stands by DaMiracie when he gets out of jail.
26	9	"The Me Nobody Knows"	December 5, 2011
Nefertiti's surprising news from her parents.
27	10	"Le French Kiss"	December 12, 2011
Tyana falls for Latrell's friend marc.
28	11	"Twas the Storm Before Christmas"	December 19, 2011
A storm covers the condo; Delroy's bus accident on the way to Las Vegas.
29	12	"Imtyana"	December 26, 2011
Imunique saves the day for Tyana.
30	13	"Right or Right Now"	January 2, 2012
Tyana's relationship issues; Imunique bad hair day.

=== Season 4: 2013-2014 ===
No. overall	No. in season	Title	Original release date
31	1	"The Kid Is Not My Skin"	October 11, 2013
Jasmine moves to LA; Latrell shows up with a groupie.
32	2	"To Live and Lie in L.A."	October 18, 2013
Jasmine gets mugged while running an errand for Delroy.
33	3	"Most Likely Not to Succeed"	October 18, 2013
Latrell's ten-year high school reunion; Imunique and Fabian pull a prank; Delroy's hot date.
34	4	"Delroy's Wonderful Life"	October 25, 2013
Delroy suffers a minor heart attack and considers shutting down Del Jones Realty
35	5	"Magic Del"	November 1, 2013
Immunique convinces Delroy; Jasmine joins Latrell's basketball team and becomes MVP.
36	6	"Delroy Indemnity"	November 8, 2013
A real-estate murder mystery.
37	7	"Close Encounters to the Third Leg"	November 15, 2013
Marc joins Latrell on a date with twins.
38	8	"Thanks for Not Giving"	November 22, 2013
Imunique's father unexpectedly shows up at Thanksgiving celebration with a surprising announcement.
39	9	"Happy Hold Up Day"	December 6, 2013
The gang is taken hostage on Christmas Eve by bank robbers.
40	10	"The Best Man for the Job"	January 24, 2014
Delroy runs for city council with Imunique as his campaign manager.
41	11	"Love with a Limit"	January 24, 2014
Delroy's relationship with his girlfriend; Latrell pretends to be Imunique's singing manager.
42	12	"Poppin' Bottles"	January 31, 2014
Delroy has a mid-life crisis after learning he's going to become a grandpa.
43	13	"The Twilaugh Zone"	February 7, 2014
Latrell has strange dreams about the gang.
44	14	"You Don't Have to Go Home, But..."	February 14, 2014
A guest overstays his welcome at Latrell's place; Bridget finds a ring in Delroy's office.
45	15	"Secret Swingers"	February 21, 2014
Delroy and Bridget befriend a couple who turn out to be swingers; Latrell is sued for stealing a joke.
46	16	"Business in Business"	February 28, 2014
Delroy evicts Latrell, prompting Latrell to take Delroy to court.
47	17	"Assets and Liabilities"	March 7, 2014
Delroy finds himself in tax trouble after being audited by the IRS.
48	18	"Knock, Knock, You're Late"	March 14, 2014
Delroy panics when Bridget thinks she might be pregnant.
49	19	"Mo' Money, Mo' Problems"	March 21, 2014
Latrell and Imunique discover a stockpile of money while refurbishing one of Delroy's properties.
50	20	"Imunique Gets Fired"	March 28, 2014
Delroy fires Imunique after she screws up at work.
51	21	"Love on the Dance Floor"	July 10, 2014
Adonis elicits jealousy from Fabian when his boyfriend recruits him for a dance competition, and it appears that she is placing him in the closet again. At the same time, Jasmine and Imunique attempt to restore the real estate documents they destroyed.
52	22	"Get the Hell Out Before I Del-out"	July 10, 2014
Delroy's ex-protégé buys out Del Jones Realty and shuts down an elderly home. Then, a simple game night goes catastrophically off the rails and pits everyone against each other, culminating in the decision to split the condo in two.
53	23	"Let's Make a Deal"	July 17, 2014
Jasmine starts getting serious with new boyfriend Terrence, but learns, to her horror, that he's a drug dealer wanted by the law. Meanwhile, Imunique must fight off distractions in the days leading up to her real estate exam.
54	24	"The Hot Seat"	July 24, 2014
Imunique throws a bachelorette party for DeLovely, but catches her cheating with a male stripper. She struggles to convince DeMiracle of what she has seen, then lands on Latrelle's new interest series.
55	25	"Gullible Is as Gullible Does"	July 31, 2014
Jasmine attends Suckers Anonymous after being victimized one too many times. Meanwhile, Cordell attempts to respond to a bully by packing a gun, but Delroy talks him out of it.
56	26	"Shady Predictions"	August 7, 2014
Fabian's cousin reads everyone's palms and causes much speculation about the future. Latrell is told that disaster will befall him within 3 days, while Imunique hears that she will find love in an unexpected place and decides to date a rich white man.
57	27	"N.O.I."	August 14, 2014
Jasmine's investment idea backfires after Imunique inducts her into the ghetto investment club. The group gets scammed and must call Pookie and Nem to retrieve their funds. Meanwhile, Bridget suspects Delroy of infidelity.
58	28	"My Way or the Hallway"	August 21, 2014
Latrell and Imunique experience attraction following a long and complicated evening in which they get locked out of their condo without cell phones or keys and must spend the night with a bunch of nutty neighbors.
59	29	"Temp Tation"	August 28, 2014
Delroy must hire a temp when Jasmine takes a broadcasting job in Alaska. When the temp accuses Delroy of sexual harassment, however, Imunique must clear his name. Meanwhile, Jasmine gets catfished by the Naked Bunny Channel.
60	30	"Ain't That About a Snitch"	September 4, 2014
Imunique encounters a burglar and becomes locally famous. The authorities ask her to I.D. the culprit, and she consents when he attacks Ms. Barleane. Meanwhile, Delroy tries to school Jasmine in closing deals, but the pupil is brighter than the teacher.
61	31	"What He Don't Know, Won't Hurt Him"	September 11, 2014
Latrell dates a trans-woman without realizing it; Fabian learns the truth and plans to break the news. Meanwhile, Imunique uses a kiss to convince everyone that she broke them up, and Delory and Macaroni Tony travel to Lake Tahoe.
62	32	"The Buckin' Stops Here"	September 18, 2014
Imunique lands Latrell's role after driving him to his commercial audition. Later, the tension between them takes a surprising turn when they begin an affair. Meanwhile, Delroy has his prostate examined.
63	33	"Is This the End?"	September 25, 2014
Delroy pops the question but discovers that Bridget is still legally wed. She tries to get a divorce, but the husband threatens suicide. Meanwhile, doubts arise about the nature of the Imunique-Latrell relationship, and Imunique reveals a surprise.
