= The Lion of Judah =

2011 American animated Christian film

- American theatrical release poster
- Directed by: Deryck Broom; Roger Hawkins
- Written by: Brent Dawes
- Produced by: Jacqui Cunningham; Phil Cunningham; Sunu Gonera; Daniel Santefort; Rose Warner
- Starring: Scott Eastwood; Ernest Borgnine; Georgina Cordova; Sandi Patty; Anupam Kher; Michael Madsen; Alphonso McAuley; Omar Benson Miller; Vic Mignogna
- Cinematography: Deryck Broom
- Edited by: Roger Hawkins; Gareth Ahrens
- Music by: AMG Music Group (Produced by: Greg Sims & Adam Carpenter)
- Production companies: Animated Family Films; Sunrise Productions; Character Matters Animation Studio
- Distributed by: Rocky Mountain Pictures
- Release date: June 3, 2011
- Running time: 87 minutes
- Countries: United States; South Africa
- Language: English
- Budget: $15 million

The Lion of Judah is a 2011 computer-animated Christian comedy-drama film produced by Animated Family Films, distributed by Rocky Mountain Pictures, and starring Scott Eastwood, Georgina Cordova, Sandi Patty, Anupam Kher, Michael Madsen, Alphonso McAuley, Omar Benson Miller, Vic Mignogna and Ernest Borgnine. It is the sequel to the Christmas short film Once Upon A Stable, taking place 30 years earlier in a Bethlehem stable as The Stable-Mates witness the birth of "The King". The film had a limited release in theaters on June 3, 2011, and a domestic DVD release on Easter 2012.

Greg Sims—one of the film's composers—stated that the film was “the first 3D faith-based animation to be released in theaters worldwide." He has uploaded his score of the film on SoundCloud.

== Synopsis ==
During the time of Jesus' crucifixion, a lamb named Judah tries to avoid being sacrificed. His friends from the stable in Bethlehem embark on a journey to save their friend.

== Cast ==
- Bruce Marchiano as Jesus
- Georgina Cordova as Judah, the lamb
- Ernest Borgnine as Slink, a rat
- Anupam Kher as Monty, a horse
- Sandi Patty as Esmay, a cow
- Michael Madsen as Boss, a raven
- Omar Benson Miller as Horace, a pig
- Vic Mignogna as Raven #1
- Rodney Newman as Raven #2
- Alphonso McAuley as Drake, a rooster
- Scott Eastwood as Jack, a donkey
- Leon Clingman as Tony
- Roger Hawkins as Hornsby
- Matthew Rutherford as Wallace
- Adrienne Pearce as Helda, a hen
- Samantha Gray as Judah's Mother
- David Magidoff as Peter
- Serena Porter as The Maiden

== Production ==
The film was animated in stereoscopic 3D at Character Matters Animation Studio in Cape Town, South Africa. It was originally meant to be released in 2009, but it was delayed to 2011 due to production issues. It was released in United States by the independent Florida-based company Rocky Mountain Pictures on June 3, 2011.

== Reception ==
The film was panned by critics; it has a 0% on Rotten Tomatoes.

=== Home media ===
The Lion of Judah was released on DVD and Blu-ray Disc by Warner Home Video on March 27, 2012.

== See also ==
- List of animated feature films
- List of computer-animated films
