= Chocolate News =

American satirical news show

- Created by: David Alan Grier
- Starring: David Alan Grier; Tangie Ambrose; Alphonso McAuley
- Country of origin: United States
- No. of seasons: 1
- No. of episodes: 10

Production
- Executive producers: David Alan Grier; Robert Morton; Fax Bahr; Adam Small; Peter Aronson; Jordan Levin
- Running time: approx. 22 min per episode.

Original release
- Network: Comedy Central
- Release: October 15 – December 17, 2008

Chocolate News is an American satirical news show hosted and head written by David Alan Grier in 2008 with an emphasis on African American culture. The show was broadcast on Wednesday nights at 10:30 pm on Comedy Central as a lead-in to its other news satire programs, The Daily Show with Jon Stewart and The Colbert Report. The show was also shown in Canada on The Comedy Network. On 10 March 2009, a Comedy Central representative confirmed that Chocolate News would not be renewed for a second season.

== Format ==
Chocolate News comprised satirical pieces and sketches about current events and news stories. The show satirized these stories with a focus on how Grier thinks typical African Americans view them. In an interview with the New York Times, Grier asked, "Are you laughing with me because you get the joke, or am I giving you license to laugh at me in a derogatory, dehumanizing way?" When the series was first pitched to studio executives at NBC, they were initially reluctant to produce and develop a pilot for the show due to the negative racial connotations associated with the term "Chocolate"; it was only with the intervention of actors Martin Sheen and William Shatner that the studio decided to proceed with the pilot and eventually to commission the show. Sketches were directed by Rusty Cundieff, who directed most of the sketches on Dave Chappelle's Chappelle's Show.

== Episodes ==
- Episode 1: first broadcast 15 October 2008
- Episode 2: first broadcast 22 October 2008
- Episode 3: first broadcast 29 October 2008
- Episode 4: first broadcast 5 November 2008
- Episode 5: first broadcast 12 November 2008
- Episode 6: first broadcast 19 November 2008
- Episode 7: first broadcast 26 November 2008
- Episode 8: first broadcast 3 December 2008
- Episode 9: first broadcast 10 December 2008
- Episode 10: first broadcast 17 December 2008

== Cast ==
- David Alan Grier
- Tangie Ambrose - Alicia Sanders
- Alphonso McAuley - Ronnie Tucker
- Chris Tallman - Alan Boda
- Jordan Peele - Kelvin Melvin
