= List of Love That Girl! episodes =

Love That Girl! is an American sitcom that airs on TV One and debuted on January 19, 2010. The series started off as a four episode, on Friday, October 11, 2013

== Series overview ==
| Season | Episodes | Season premiere | Season finale |
|---|---|---|---|
| 1 | 4 | January 19, 2010 | January 21, 2010 |
| 2 | 13 | January 10, 2011 | April 4, 2011 |
| 3 | 13 | October 17, 2011 | January 2, 2012 |
| 4 | 33 | October 11, 2013 | September 25, 2014 |

== Episodes ==
=== Season 1 (2010) ===
| No. overall | No. in season | Title | Original release date |
|---|---|---|---|
| 1 | 1 | "Pilot" | January 19, 2010 |
Tyana Jones (Tatyana Ali) returns to Los Angeles, newly-single after a recent divorce, ready to start the next phase of her life. Before she can get comfy in her new condo, her vagabond brother Latrell (Alphonso McAuley) pays a surprise visit for an extended stay with his sister. Tyana's father, Delroy Jones (Phil Morris) is thrilled to have his "Babygirl" close to home and happier to discover her plans to follow in his professional footsteps until he discovers her plans to work for the competition.
| 2 | 2 | "My Guy Friend" | January 19, 2010 |
Tyana's old childhood friend, Guy (Wesley Jonathan) is coming to town along with his new fiance' (Shanti Lowry) and she decides to throw a small dinner party to celebrate their engagement. Things get out of hand when Guy's stuffy fiance' discovers a few secrets about Tyana and Guy's past. Guy decides to call the engagement off and runs to Tyana for encouragement.
| 3 | 3 | "Keep It in the Closet" | January 20, 2010 |
Latrell has a sexy new girlfriend Alexis (Caryn Ward) and everything is cozy until he learns that Sexy Lexi has a secret passion.
| 4 | 4 | "My Sister's Keeper?" | January 21, 2010 |
Tyana and Latrell get a surprise visit from a woman who claims that they all may have something in common — the same father. When Delroy confirms that the woman (Faune Chambers) is his love child, the entire family is shocked to learn of her reason for the visit.

=== Season 2 (2011) ===
| No. overall | No. in season | Title | Original release date |
|---|---|---|---|
| 5 | 1 | "Don't Stop Til Get You Enough" | January 10, 2011 |
Tyana takes a walk on the wild side when she engages in an "open house rendezvous" with slick real estate agent Chance Brown. A rival real estate agent, Curtis Williams, threatens to go public with the videotaped evidence of Tyana’s tryst unless she is willing to give up her commissions from the sale of the house.
| 6 | 2 | "Break of Dawn" | January 10, 2011 |
Delroy’s huge real estate venture is jeopardized when Tyana goes with his business partner’s daughter to a pole dance. class. Tyana embarrasses her dad when she goes to a pole-dancing class with a business partner's daughter and jeopardizes a real-estate deal
| 7 | 3 | "Will You Be There" | January 17, 2011 |
Latrell’s relationship with his family and friends is strained when he uses material from their lives for his stand-up comedy act. Latrell upsets the family when he uses their lives as material for his stand-up act.
| 8 | 4 | "Torture" | January 24, 2011 |
Tyana gets more than she bargained for when her sister Kelly asks her to be the maid-of-honor at her upcoming wedding and turns into a Bridezilla. Tyana's in over her head when her sister asks her to be her maid of honor, then becomes impossible to work with.
| 9 | 5 | "Beat It" | January 31, 2011 |
Tyana’s extravagant godmother, Miss Earlene pays a visit and turns her life upside down. Tyana's godmother visits and disrupts her life.
| 10 | 6 | "A Fool for You" | February 7, 2011 |
Tyana finds love at a speed-dating event, until she finds out her new guy is a professional clown.
| 11 | 7 | "Wanna Be Startin' Something" | February 14, 2011 |
The strength of their friendship is tested when Tyana lends Nefertiti money. Tyana lends money to Nefertiti, which puts a strain on their friendship.
| 12 | 8 | "Remember the Time" | February 21, 2011 |
Some secrets are revealed when Tyana discovers a new client’s husband was "the one that got away" when she was in college. Tyana dated a client's spouse in college and still thinks of him as "the one that got away. Absent: Peter Oldring as Fabian, Mark Adair-Rios as Adonis & Kendyl Joi as Netefift Carter
| 13 | 9 | "In The Closet" | February 28, 2011 |
Tyana poses as Fabian’s fiancée until he can tell his very conservative parents he’s gay.
| 14 | 10 | "P.Y.T." | March 7, 2011 |
Tyana discovers that her father, Delroy is dating a much younger woman who is secretly married and decides she must confront the woman and tell her father the truth.
| 15 | 11 | "Maybe Tomorrow" | April 4, 2011 |
Latrell is on a mission to meet Charlie Murphy and get some stand-up comedy tips.
| 16 | 12 | "If I Have to Move a Mountain" | April 4, 2011 |
Charlie Murphy sees Latrell perform stand-up and offers him the opening gig on his tour.
| 17 | 13 | "Heartbreak Hotel" | April 4, 2011 |
Latrell's new-found success goes to his head and Tyana kicks him out of the condo.

=== Season 3 (2011–12) ===
| No. overall | No. in season | Title | Original release date |
|---|---|---|---|
| 18 | 1 | "Dilemma Date" | October 17, 2011 |
Nef dates a guy that Tyana met and went out with first.
| 19 | 2 | "Director's Cut" | October 17, 2011 |
Tyana sets up a real estate deal for a wealthy director; Latrell starts a job as a personal trainer.
| 20 | 3 | "Trick or Treat" | October 24, 2011 |
Recounting scary events at the DNA Lounge.
| 21 | 4 | "Fighting Shape" | October 31, 2011 |
Tyana takes kickboxing lessons; Latrell asks Delroy for a job.
| 22 | 5 | "Head Shrunk" | November 7, 2011 |
Tyana sees a therapist who suggests that she move on by calling her ex-husband.
| 23 | 6 | "Happy Birthday, Bro" | November 14, 2011 |
Tyana's discovers Delroy's long lost brother; Jimi tries reuniting the brothers.
| 24 | 7 | "Fatal Attractions" | November 21, 2011 |
Delroy's ex from high school is in town to rekindle their relationship.
| 25 | 8 | "Thug Passions" | November 28, 2011 |
Tyana stands by DaMiracle when he gets out of jail.
| 26 | 9 | "The Me Nobody Knows" | December 5, 2011 |
Nefertiti's surprising news from her parents.
| 27 | 10 | "Le French Kiss" | December 12, 2011 |
Tyana falls for Latrell's friend Marc.
| 28 | 11 | "Twas the Storm Before Christmas" | December 19, 2011 |
A storm covers the condo; Delroy's bus accident on the way to Las Vegas.
| 29 | 12 | "Imtyana" | December 26, 2011 |
Imunique saves the day for Tyana.
| 30 | 13 | "Right or Right Now" | January 2, 2012 |
Tyana's relationship issues; Imunique bad hair day Note: This episode marks the final appearances of Tatyana Ali as Tyana Jones & Kendyl Joi as Nefertiti Carter.

=== Season 4 (2013–14) ===
| No. overall | No. in season | Title | Original release date |
|---|---|---|---|
| 31 | 1 | "The Kid Is Not My Skin" | October 11, 2013 |
Jasmine moves to LA; Latrell shows up with a groupie. Note: This episode marks the first appearance of Reagan Gomez-Preston as Jasmine Russell
| 32 | 2 | "To Live and Lie in L.A" | October 18, 2013 |
Jasmine gets mugged while running an errand for Delroy.
| 33 | 3 | "Most Likely Not to Succeed" | October 18, 2013 |
Latrell's ten-year high school reunion; Imunique and Fabian pull a prank; Delroy's hot date.
| 34 | 4 | "Delroy's Wonderful Life" | October 25, 2013 |
Delroy suffers a minor heart attack and considers shutting down Del Jones Realty
| 35 | 5 | "Magic Del" | November 1, 2013 |
Immunique convinces Delroy; Jasmine joins Latrell's basketball team and becomes MVP.
| 36 | 6 | "Delroy Indemnity" | November 8, 2013 |
A real-estate murder mystery.
| 37 | 7 | "Close Encounters of the Third Leg" | November 15, 2013 |
Marc joins Latrell on a date with twins.
| 38 | 8 | "Thanks for Not Giving" | November 22, 2013 |
Imunique's father unexpectedly shows up at Thanksgiving celebration with a surprising announcement.
| 39 | 9 | "Happy Hold Up Day" | December 6, 2013 |
The gang are taken hostage on Christmas Eve by bank robbers.
| 40 | 10 | "The Best Man for the Job" | January 24, 2014 |
Delroy runs for city council with Imunique as campaign manager.
| 41 | 11 | "Love With a Limit" | January 24, 2014 |
Delroy's relationship with his girlfriend; Latrell pretends to be Imunique's singing manager.
| 42 | 12 | "Poppin' Bottles" | January 31, 2014 |
Delroy has a mid-life crisis after learning he's going to become a grandpa.
| 43 | 13 | "The Twilaugh Zone" | February 7, 2014 |
Latrell has strange dreams about the gang.
| 44 | 14 | "You Don't Have to Go Home But" | February 14, 2014 |
A guest overstays his welcome at Latrell's place; Bridget finds a ring in Delroy's office.
| 45 | 15 | "Secret Swingers" | February 21, 2014 |
Delroy and Bridget befriend a couple who turn out to be swingers; Latrell is sued for stealing a joke.
| 46 | 16 | "Business in Business" | February 28, 2014 |
Delroy evicts Latrell, prompting Latrell to take Delroy to court.
| 47 | 17 | "Assets and Liabilites" | March 7, 2014 |
Delroy finds himself in tax trouble after being audited by the IRS.
| 48 | 18 | "Knock, Knock You're Late" | March 14, 2014 |
Delroy panics when Bridget thinks she might be pregnant.
| 49 | 19 | "Mo' Money Mo' Problems" | March 21, 2014 |
Latrell and Imunique discover a stockpile of money while refurbishing one of Delroy's properties.
| 50 | 20 | "Imunique Gets Fired" | March 28, 2014 |
Delroy fires Imunique after she screws up at work.
| 51 | 21 | "Love on the Dance Floor" | July 10, 2014 |
Adonis elicits jealousy from Fabian when his boy friend recruits him for a dance competition and it appears that she is placing him in the closet again. At the same time, Jasmine and Imunique attempt to restore the real estate documents they destroyed.
| 52 | 22 | "I'll Get the Hell Out Before I Delout" | July 10, 2014 |
Delroy ex-protégé buys out Del Jones Realty and shuts down an elderly home. Then, a simple game night goes catastrophically off the rails and pits everyone against each other, culminating in the decision to split the condo in two.
| 53 | 23 | "Let's Make a Deal" | July 17, 2014 |
Jasmine starts getting serious with new boyfriend Terrence, but learns to her horror that he's a drug dealer wanted by the law. Meanwhile, Imunique must fight off distractions in the days leading up to her real estate exam.
| 54 | 24 | "The Hot Seat" | July 24, 2014 |
Imunique throws a bachelorette party for DeLovely, but catches her cheating with a male stripper. She struggles to convince DeMiracle of what she has seen, then lands on Latrelle's new interest series.
| 55 | 25 | "Gullible is a Gullible Does" | July 31, 2014 |
Jasmine attends Suckers Anonymous after being victimized one too many times. Meanwhile, Cordell attempts to respond to a bully by packing a gun but Delroy talks him out of it.
| 56 | 26 | "Shady Predictions" | August 7, 2014 |
Fabian's cousin reads everyone's palms and causes much speculation about the future. Latrell is told that disaster will befall him within 3 days, while Imunique hears that she will find love in an unexpected place and decides to date a rich white man.
| 57 | 27 | "N.O.I" | August 14, 2014 |
Jasmine's investment idea backfires after Imunique inducts her into the ghetto investment club. The group gets scammed and must call Nem and Pookie to retrieve their funds. Meanwhile, Bridget suspects Delroy of infidelity.
| 58 | 28 | "My Way or the Hallway" | August 21, 2014 |
Latrell and Imunique experience attraction following a long and complicated evening in which they get locked out of their condo without cell phones or keys and must spend the night with a bunch of nutty neighbors.
| 59 | 29 | "Temp Tation" | August 28, 2014 |
Delroy must hire a temp when Jasmine takes a broadcasting job in Alaska. When the temp accuses Delroy of sexual harassment, however, Imunique must clear his name. Meanwhile, Jasmine gets catfished by the Naked Bunny Channel.
| 60 | 30 | "Ain't About That a Snitch" | September 4, 2014 |
Imunique encounters a burglar and becomes locally famous. The authorities ask her to I.D. the culprit, and she consents when he attacks Ms. Earlene. Meanwhile, Delroy tries to school Jasmine in closing deals, but the pupil is brighter than the teacher.
| 61 | 31 | "What He Don't Know, Won't Hurt Him" | September 11, 2014 |
Latrell dates a trans-woman without realizing it; Fabian learns the truth and plans to break the news. Meanwhile, Imunique uses a kiss to convince everyone that she broke them up, and Delory and Macorani Tony travel to Lake Tahoe.
| 62 | 32 | "The Buckin' Stops Here" | September 18, 2014 |
Imunique lands Latrell's role after driving him to his commercial audition. Later, the tension between them takes a surprising turn when they begin an affair. Meanwhile, Delroy has his prostate examined.
| 63 | 33 | "Is This The End?" | September 25, 2014 |
Delroy pops the question, but discovers that Bridget is still legally wed. She tries to get a divorce, but the husband threatens suicide. Meanwhile, doubts arise about the nature of the Imunique-Latrell relationship, and Imunique reveals a surprise.
