= Alphonso McAuley =

American actor

- Born: New Haven, Connecticut, U.S.
- Education: California State University, Fullerton (BA)
- Occupations: Actor, comedian
- Years active: 2003–present
- Children: 1

Alphonso McAuley is an American actor and social media personality. He is best known for playing Cassius Sparks in the Fox sitcom Breaking In and Hutch in the ABC sitcom The Middle.

== Early life and education ==
McAuley was born in New Haven, Connecticut and raised in Chino, California. He earned a Bachelor of Arts degree in communications and Afro-Ethnic studies from California State University, Fullerton.

== Career ==
In 2004, McAuley played Bucky in the Fat Albert movie. He played Orsten Artis in the 2006 film Glory Road and Walt in the 2007 film Pride. He went on to co-star with Tatyana Ali in the sitcom Love That Girl!. In 2011, he voiced the rooster Drake in The Lion of Judah. From 2013 to 2018, he played Hutch on the ABC sitcom The Middle.

McAuley appears in the music video for "Miracle" by Matisyahu.

McAuley was popular on the social media app Vine, amassing over one million followers as of 2014.

== Filmography ==
=== Film ===
Year	Title	Role	Notes
2004	Fat Albert	Bucky	
2005	Reversal of Misfortune	Teenage Driver	
2006	Glory Road	Orsten Artis	
2007	Pride	Walt	
2007	Katt Williams: American Hustle	Penguin	
2008	Nim's Island	Russell	Uncredited
2011	Cat Run	Julian Simms	
2011	The Lion of Judah	Drake	Voice
2014	Walk of Shame	Pookie	
2014	Cat Run 2	Julian	
2015	The Submarine Kid	Paul	
2017	Random Tropical Paradise	Randy	
2017	Maximum Impact	Nathan Robinson	Uncredited
2020	The Bellmen	JJ	
2021	Broken Diamonds	Tolbert	
2022	North of the 10	The Announcer	
2022	The Hyperions	Ansel	

=== Television ===
Year	Title	Role	Notes
2003	Joan of Arcadia	DJ God	Episode: "The Uncertainty Principle"
2006	The Jake Effect	Cliff Johnson	Episode: "Don't Mess with Sloppy"
2008	Chocolate News	Ronnie Tucker	7 episodes
2010–2014	Love That Girl!	Latrell Jones	43 episodes
2011	Glenn Martin, DDS	Xiang-Bu	Episode: "Date with Destiny"
2011–2012	Breaking In	Calvin 'Cash' Sparks	20 episodes
2013–2018	The Middle	Hutch	25 episodes
2015	Key & Peele	Buddy #3	Episode: "MC Mom"
2016	Lele Pons and Hannah Stocking	Therapist / Bach's Friend	2 episodes
2016–2018	King Bachelor's Pad	Various roles	3 episodes
2017	Girlboss	Dax	13 episodes
2017	Caught the Series	Uber driver	3 episodes
2018	No Sleep 'Til Christmas	Andy	Television film
2019	Kevin Hart's Guide to Black History	Vivien Thomas	Netflix special
2019–2020	Schooled	Coop Dugan	18 episodes
