= Paternity (House) =

- House episode
- Episode no.: Season 1 Episode 2
- Directed by: Peter O'Fallon
- Written by: Lawrence Kaplow
- Original air date: November 23, 2004

Guest appearances
- Scott Mechlowicz as Dan; Robin Thomas as Dan's father; Wendy Gazelle as Dan's mother; Alex Skuby as John Funsten

Episode chronology
← Previous "Pilot"	Next → "Occam's Razor"
- House season 1

"Paternity" is the second episode of the medical drama House, which was first broadcast on Fox on November 23, 2004. A teenage boy is struck on the head in a lacrosse game and is found to have hallucinations and night terrors that are not due to concussion.

== Plot ==
When a clinic patient claims to have an appointment with the diagnostic department, House is skeptical of the letter which he himself supposedly wrote to the family. House realizes that it was written by Cameron, but listens when he hears that one of the symptoms is night terrors. The patient, Dan (Scott Mechlowicz), is a 16-year-old lacrosse player who has been recently hit in the head in a game. House suggests that the night terrors were a result in post-traumatic stress disorder from sexual abuse and his double vision was caused by a concussion and/or eye strain. Then he notices Dan's foot twitch with a myoclonic jerk which normally only occurs when falling asleep. He immediately admits Dan and starts diagnosis with his team.

House claims that Dan's father is not his true biological father and makes a bet with Foreman. None of the tests show why the night terrors occurred, but House finds a large blockage in one of Dan's brain ventricles. House and his team relieve the pressure, but they find that the blockage is not causing the other symptoms.

During the night, Dan is found missing from his bed. Cameron, Chase, and Foreman soon locate him on the roof, where he is hallucinating that he is on the lacrosse field. House is excited by this new development—it rules out his previous diagnosis of multiple sclerosis. The new diagnosis provided by Cameron is neurosyphilis. To treat this, they inject penicillin through a lumbar puncture, but during the injection Dan suffers an auditory hallucination, which rules out this diagnosis. House is stumped by this new development, and admits his problems to Wilson. Dan's parents are angered to discover House having coffee with Wilson while their son is dying. After House quickly elaborates in great detail exactly what Dan's condition is at the time, he tells them to go and support Dan, after which he takes their coffee cups to run DNA paternity testing. The tests show that neither parent is biologically related to Dan.

House remembers a baby he treated earlier whose mother did not want to vaccinate the child and hypothesizes that infant Dan may have caught the measles virus, which remained latent for 16 years. Avoiding a dangerous procedure to confirm this unusual case, they biopsy Dan's retina to find the virus, confirming House's diagnosis of subacute sclerosing panencephalitis. Dan recovers fully after brain surgery and reveals that he already knew he was adopted because he has a cleft chin while his parents don't, but that he does not care.

== Medical aspects ==
The sequence of tentative diagnoses in this case was:

1. Sexual abuse
2. Concussion
3. Degenerative disease
4. Hydrocephalus
5. Multiple sclerosis
6. Neurosyphilis
7. Subacute sclerosing panencephalitis

The successful cure for the final diagnosis was to inject interferon into the brain, although in the real world subacute sclerosing panencephalitis is incurable, and almost always leads to death. The doctors have difficulty explaining this treatment, with the story examining the problem of obtaining informed consent in complex cases. The medical advisor for this episode was Lisa Sanders.

== Recurring themes ==
The theme that "everybody lies" appears here in the question of the patient's paternity. The parents had lied to him in not telling him that he was adopted and do not admit this to House either.

== Reception ==
Robert Bianco, writing in USA Today, recommended the episode as "first-rate".
