= Scott Mechlowicz =

American actor

- Born: Scott David Mechlowicz; January 17, 1981 (age 45); New York City, U.S.
- Education: University of California, Los Angeles
- Occupation: Actor
- Years active: 2003–present
- Children: 2

Scott David Mechlowicz (born January 17, 1981) is an American actor. He is known for appearing in the films Mean Creek (2004), EuroTrip (2004), and Peaceful Warrior (2006).

== Early life and education ==
Scott David Mechlowicz was born on January 17, 1981, in New York City, the son of Susan (née Lehrman), a respiratory therapist, and Morris Mechlowicz. He also has one brother, M. Steven Neal. He was raised in a tight-knit Jewish family. He grew up in Plano, Texas, where he graduated from Plano Senior High School in 1999, and attended the University of Texas at Austin for one semester. He subsequently moved to Los Angeles, California, where he studied at the University of California, Los Angeles and graduated in 2003 from the Conservatory Acting Program.

== Career ==
Mechlowicz made his film debut in the teen comedy EuroTrip. The same year, he also starred in the independent film Mean Creek, which was filmed in 2003 but not given a limited theatrical release until August 20, 2004.

In the film, which was a dark teenage drama, Mechlowicz played the oldest of a group of teenagers. The film received a positive critical reception. He received an Independent Spirit Award for his acting in Mean Creek. In 2004, he made a small appearance in the video for Gavin Degraw's song "I Don't Want to Be", in which he plays the romantic interest of Shiri Appleby. Also in 2004, Mechlowicz guest starred in a season one episode of the television series House.

Mechlowicz also starred, opposite Nick Nolte and Amy Smart, in the drama Peaceful Warrior (based on the book Way of the Peaceful Warrior), in which he plays the lead role of Dan Millman, a rings gymnast who is an olympic hopeful. The story is based on the life of the book's author. His next film was the thriller Gone, filmed in 2005 and released in 2007, co-starring Amelia Warner. In 2010, Mechlowicz appeared in two films, Waiting for Forever, co-starring Rachel Bilson, Blythe Danner, Richard Jenkins, and Tom Sturridge, and the dark suspense drama Undocumented starring Mechlowicz and Peter Stormare.

On April 1, 2011, Cat Run opened in theaters, starring Mechlowicz, Paz Vega, and Janet McTeer. In March 2012, Eden debuted at the South by Southwest Film Festival in Austin, Texas. In Eden, Mechlowicz played the boyishly charming bait luring young girls into a sex trafficking ring, based on a true story. Eden costars Beau Bridges and Jamie Chung and was directed by Megan Griffiths.

== Filmography ==
=== Film ===
Year	Title	Role	Notes
2003	Neverland	Smee	
2004	Mean Creek	Marty Blank	Independent Spirit Award for Special Distinction (shared with the cast)
2004	EuroTrip	Scott Thomas	
2006	Peaceful Warrior	Dan Millman	
2007	Gone	Taylor	
2010	Waiting for Forever	Jim	
2010	Undocumented	Travis	
2011	Cat Run	Anthony	
2012	Eden	Jesse	
2014	Cat Run 2	Anthony	
2015	Demonic	Bryan	
2017	Mad Genius	Finn	
2025	The Confession	Grayson	

=== Television ===
Year	Title	Role	Notes
2003	Days of Our Lives	Tim	2 episodes
2004	House	Dan	Episode: "Paternity"

=== Commercials ===
Year	Brand	Role	Notes
2002	Pepsi	Concert attendee	Super Bowl commercial with MXPX as the performing band
