= Bill Perkins (businessman) =

American hedge fund manager, film producer, and poker player (born 1969)

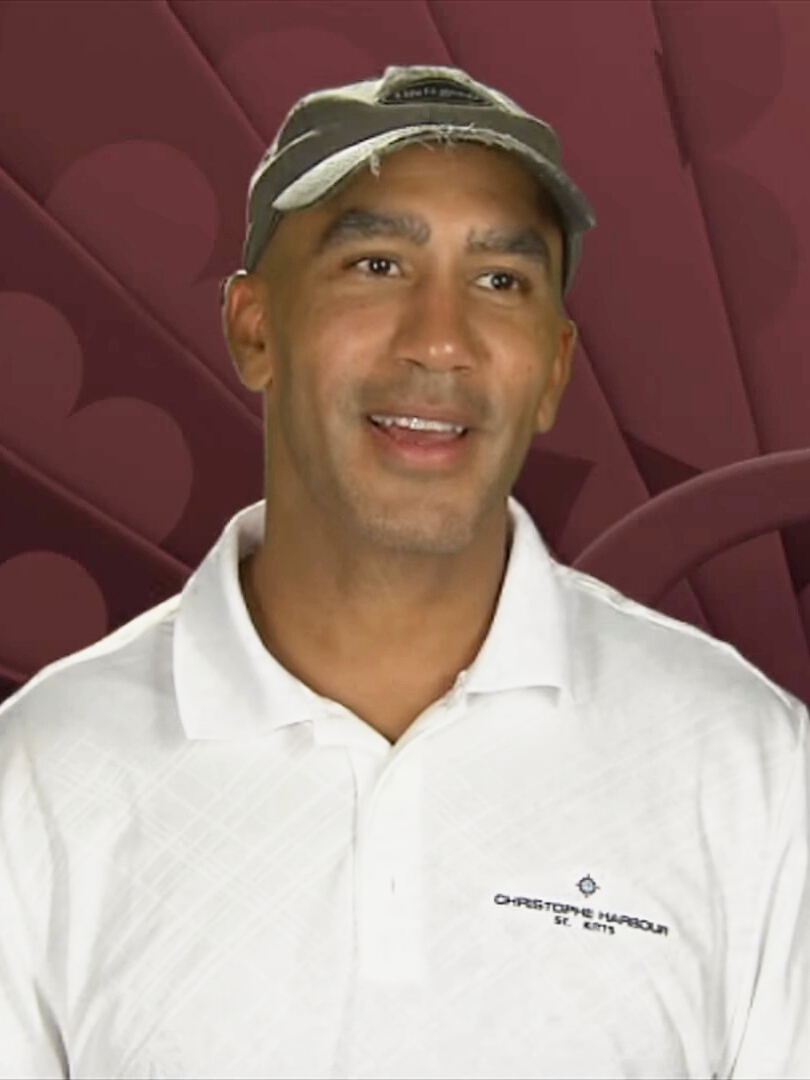
- Perkins in 2015
- Born: February 2, 1969 (age 57); Jersey City, New Jersey
- Education: University of Iowa (BS)
- Occupations: Hedge fund manager, poker player
- Known for: Skylar Capital; Die with Zero book; SkyFi

William Osborne Perkins III (born February 2, 1969) is an American hedge fund manager, entrepreneur, author, film producer, and poker player. He is the founder of Skylar Capital, an energy-focused hedge fund, and a co-founder of the Earth observation company SkyFi. He is also a co-founder of the data and geospatial intelligence company SynMax.

== Early life and education ==
Perkins grew up in Jersey City, New Jersey. His father, Perkin II was a criminal defense attorney who served two terms in the New Jersey General Assembly and played four games as a running back for the New York Jets. His mother was a schoolteacher. He received a B.S. in electrical engineering from the University of Iowa, his father's alma mater, where he was a walk-on defensive back for the Iowa Hawkeyes football team. He did not have good grades and quit playing football before his senior year.

== Career ==
=== Energy trading ===
In 1991, Perkins became a trainee for a clerk on the New York Mercantile Exchange. In 1995, during the deregulation of the electricity market in Texas, Perkins moved to Houston to run a trade derivatives and options desk as a trader and risk manager for El Paso Energy, Statoil, AIG Energy Trading, and Zahr Securities.

In 1997, he founded Small Ventures USA, L.P. the lead investor in CUTUCO Energy, a project to build a liquefied natural gas facility and natural gas fueled power plant in El Salvador.

In 2002, he joined his friend and former Enron trader John D. Arnold's new hedge fund, Centaurus Energy. He made a notable amount of trading profits for the firm, including taking the opposite side of trades that led to the collapse of Amaranth Advisors in 2006, making Arnold the youngest billionaire in the U.S. at age 33. Despite annual gains Centaurus shut down in 2012 due to low natural gas prices. Perkins, then founded Skylar Capital, a fund to trade U.S. gas futures, options and swaps. It raised $102 million in capital in its first 3 months.

In 2006, Perkins was a member of the board of directors of NorthernStar Natural Gas.

=== Poker ===
Perkins, a poker player, has entered notable events including the World Series of Poker, Big One for One Drop, Triton Poker Super High Roller Series, PokerStars Big Game, and PokerStars Caribbean Adventure. Perkins is friends with and often plays with Dan Bilzerian.

His total live tournament winnings exceed $5.5 million of which $2.7 million came from his One Drop cash at the WSOP. Perkins says he has also lost millions and considers himself an amateur.

=== Others ===
In 2017, he filed a lawsuit against the United States Virgin Islands, claiming that he was entitled to a $5 million tax refund for tax year 2015.

In May 2022, Perkins rocked the art world when he purchased The Sugar Shack, a painting by Ernie Barnes made famous on Good Times, a 1970s sitcom, for $15.3 million at a Christie's auction.

=== SkyFi ===
In 2021, Perkins co-founded SkyFi, an Austin, Texas-based Earth observation technology company, with entrepreneur Luke Fischer. The company developed a digital marketplace that allows users to search for, purchase, and task satellite imagery from multiple providers through a single platform.

In 2026, SkyFi raised US$12.7 million in a Series A funding round led by Buoyant Ventures and IronGate Capital Advisors.

Later that year, U.S. Special Operations Command (USSOCOM) evaluated the company's mobile platform for accessing commercial satellite imagery on handheld Android tactical devices.

In 2026, SkyFi was selected to participate in NATO's Defence Innovation Accelerator for the North Atlantic (DIANA) programme.

=== SynMax ===
In 2021, Perkins co-founded SynMax with quantitative analyst Eric Anderson, who became the company's chief executive officer. The company develops geospatial data analytics for the maritime and energy sectors.

In 2022, SynMax partnered with Planet Labs to develop energy intelligence and maritime monitoring services, including the detection of vessels operating without transmitting location data.

In 2026, SynMax partnered with Satellogic to develop intelligence services based on the planned Merlin satellite constellation.

== Philanthropy ==
In 2016, Perkins contributed $1.5 million towards the construction of the William O. Perkins III '86 Athletic Center at St. Peter's Preparatory School, his alma mater.

== Books ==
In 2020, Perkins released the book Die with Zero, a book on how to get the most from money and life. The book's main theme is to discourage long-term financial hoarding, noting that dying with a large amount of unspent money means missed opportunities on forming positive experiences and memories that may be more difficult to achieve later in life.

== Personal life ==
Perkins has two daughters from a previous marriage to Stephanie Park. In July 2022, he married Lara Sebastian, a dancer.
