= Subacute sclerosing panencephalitis =

Rare form of progressive brain inflammation

- Other names: Dawson disease
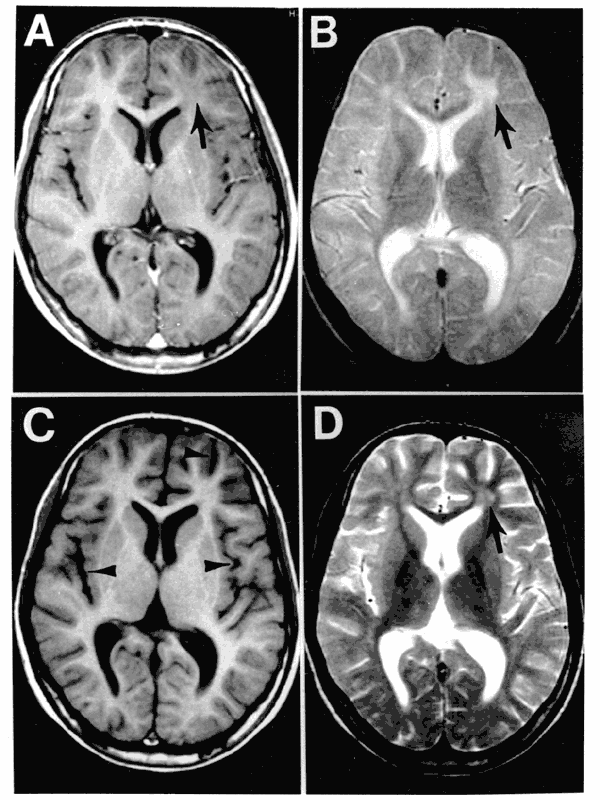
- Subacute sclerosing panencephalitis
- Specialty: Neurology, infectious diseases
- Symptoms: Behavior changes, seizures, spasticity, poor coordination, coma
- Usual onset: 6–15 years after infection with measles
- Causes: Measles virus
- Risk factors: Measles infection
- Diagnostic method: EEG, Serologic testing, brain biopsy
- Prevention: Measles vaccine
- Treatment: Supportive treatment
- Medication: Intrathecal interferon alpha, intravenous ribavirin, isoprinosine
- Prognosis: Usually fatal
- Frequency: 2 in 10,000 for all age groups; as high as 1 in 609 for unvaccinated infants under 15 months

Subacute sclerosing panencephalitis (SSPE), also known as Dawson disease, is a rare form of progressive brain inflammation caused by a persistent infection with the measles virus. The condition primarily affects children, teens, and young adults. It has been estimated that about 2 in 10,000 people who get measles will eventually develop SSPE. However, a 2016 study estimated that the rate for unvaccinated infants under 15 months was as high as 1 in 609. No cure for SSPE exists, and the condition is almost always fatal. SSPE is sometimes confused with acute disseminated encephalomyelitis, which can also be caused by the measles virus, but has a very different timing and course.

SSPE is caused by some strains of the wild-type (naturally occurring) measles virus, such as the B3 strain, but not by the strains used in measles vaccines.

== Signs and symptoms ==
SSPE is characterized by a history of primary measles infection, followed by a normal, unremarkable recovery. Symptoms of SSPE appear later. On average, the first symptoms appear about 10 years after the initial infection, though this varies significantly, as some people have developed SSPE symptoms as soon as 1 month after infection, and others as long as 27 years later.

After the asymptomatic period, progressive neurological deterioration occurs, characterized by behavior change, intellectual problems, myoclonic seizures, blindness, ataxia, and eventually death.

The very earliest symptoms are small, subtle changes in behavior, such as not paying attention or struggling with schoolwork. By the time family members have become concerned, the disease is at Stage 1. It shows nonspecific symptoms of neurological problems, such as being more irritable than usual, more affectionate than usual, lethargic, or having speech difficulties. Because the symptoms are nonspecific, in this stage, it may be obvious to people who know the child well that something is wrong, but unclear what the problem is.

Later symptoms include myoclonic seizures, epileptic seizures, loss of vision, loss of coordination, and difficulty moving.

=== Stages of progression ===
There are multiple staging systems. Symptoms progress through four stages, such as these:

- Stage 1: There may be personality changes, mood swings, or depression. Fever, headache, and memory loss may also be present. This stage may last up to 6 months.
- Stage 2: This stage may involve jerking, muscle spasms, seizures, loss of vision, and dementia.
- Stage 3: Jerking movements are replaced by writhing (twisting) movements and rigidity. At this stage, complications may result in blindness or death.
- Stage 4: Progressive loss of consciousness into a persistent vegetative state, which may be preceded by or concomitant with paralysis, occurs in the final stage, during which breathing, heart rate, and blood pressure are affected. Death usually occurs as a result of fever, heart failure, or the brain's inability to control the autonomic nervous system.

== Pathogenesis ==
SSPE is caused by a latent infection by mutated copies of wild type (naturally occurring) measles virus. A large number of nucleocapsids are produced in the neurons and the glial cells. In these cells, the mutated viral genes that encode envelope proteins have restricted expression. Without the envelope protein, infectious particles are not produced, and the defective virus can survive persistently without evoking an immune response. Eventually, the infection will lead to SSPE.

When SSPE begins, it demyelinates nerves, causing them to signal unreliably. Later, the brain cortex atrophies, and the ventricular system becomes dilated. Nerve cells are destroyed through phagocytosis. Tauopathies and neurofibrillary tangles develop.

== Diagnosis ==
SSPE may be suspected in any child with symptoms of a progressive (keeps getting worse) neurological disease and who has never been vaccinated against measles.

Typical diagnostic tests include electroencephalography (EEG) to look for evidence of epilepsy or other disturbances to brain waves and a test of the cerebrospinal fluid to look for elevated levels of antibodies against measles and to rule out multiple sclerosis. Magnetic resonance imaging (MRI) of the brain usually looks normal early in the disease.

== Treatment ==
There is no cure. Most treatments are supportive measures, such as anticonvulsants to reduce seizures.

If the diagnosis is made early, oral isoprinosine (Inosiplex) is standard, but it is expensive and only stabilizes or improves symptoms for about 30% of people with SSPE. Less effective medications include intraventricular interferon alfa, amantadine, ribavirin, and others. Immunoglobulin therapy (IVIG) is also used. Isoprinosine is sometimes combined with interferon alfa.

Following the onset of stage 2, the disease is invariably fatal.

== Prevention ==
SSPE is a disease for which prevention is the best medicine. SSPE can be prevented by vaccinating children against measles before they become infected. The strains of measles virus in the measles vaccines do not cause SSPE.

== Prognosis ==
Almost everyone who develops SSPE dies as a result of SSPE or secondary complications. Commonly, the person dies within a few months to a few years. Faster deterioration in cases of acute fulminant SSPE can lead to death within 3 months of diagnosis. This faster progression may be called measles inclusion body encephalitis.

Although the prognosis is bleak for SSPE past stage 1, there is a 5% spontaneous remission rate. This may take the form of either a full remission of symptoms that may last many years, or an improvement in condition, giving a longer progression period, or else at least a longer period with the less severe symptoms.

If a remission is achieved, the subsequent relapse is untreatable.

== Epidemiology ==
The number of people who develop SSPE depends on the number of infections. For every 100,000 children or adults who get measles, between 4 and 11 of them will develop SSPE. An outbreak of measles within any community is "inevitably" followed by an uptick in SSPE among those infected, usually children.

The chance of developing SSPE is higher for babies (about 1 in 600 infected babies will later develop SSPE) than for those who had measles when they were older. Boys develop SSPE about three times as often as girls.

SSPE is a rare condition, although its incidence remains relatively high in Asia and the Middle East. However, the number of reported cases is declining since the introduction of the measles vaccine. Eradication of the measles virus prevents the SSPE mutation and, therefore, the progression of the disease, or even the initial infection itself.

== History ==
SSPE was first described by James R. Dawson Jr. of the Vanderbilt University School of Medicine in 1933.

== See also ==
- Paternity (House): said episode depicts a (fictional) case of SSPE. In the episode, the patient recovers after an injection of interferon into the brain. This is not a real-world treatment for the condition.
